= Figure skating at the European Youth Olympic Festival =

The European Youth Olympic Festival (also European Youth Olympic Days) is a multi-sport event held in both summer and winter disciplines every second year. Figure skating is one of the sports in its winter edition. The competition is held in junior category.

== Results ==
=== Men's singles ===
Year	Location	Gold	Silver	Bronze	Ref.
1993	(Italy) Aosta	(Finland) Markus Leminen	(France) Thierry Cerez	(Ukraine) Yevgeny Martynov	
1995	Andorra	(Hungary) Szabolcs Vidrai	(Ukraine) Vitaliy Danylchenko	(Germany) David Jäschke	
1997	(Sweden) Sundsvall	(Russia) Evgeni Plushenko	(Georgia (country)) Vakhtang Murvanidze	(Ukraine) Oleksandr Smokvin	
1999	(Slovakia) Poprad-Tatry	(Russia) Stanislav Timchenko	(Switzerland) Stéphane Lambiel	(Sweden) Kristoffer Berntsson	
2001	(Finland) Vuokatti	No figure skating competition			
2003	(Slovenia) Bled	(Russia) Sergei Dobrin	(France) Yannick Ponsero	(Germany) Radomir Soumar	
2005	(Switzerland) Monthey	(Sweden) Adrian Schultheiss	(France) Kim Lucine	(Russia) Nikita Mikhailov	
2007	(Spain) Jaca	(Russia) Artem Grigoriev	(Sweden) Alexander Majorov	(France) Alexandre Briancon	
2009	(Poland) Cieszyn	(Estonia) Viktor Romanenkov	(Ukraine) Stanislav Pertsov	(Russia) Gordei Gorshkov	
2011	(Czech Republic) Liberec	(Czech Republic) Petr Coufal	(Russia) Maxim Kovtun	(France) Simon Hocquaux	
2013	(Romania) Brașov	(Russia) Adian Pitkeev	(Ukraine) Yaroslav Paniot	(France) Adrien Tesson	
2015	(Austria) Dornbirn	(Ukraine) Ivan Pavlov	(Latvia) Deniss Vasiļjevs	(Russia) Dmitri Aliev	
2017	(Turkey) Erzurum	(Russia) Petr Gumennik	(Italy) Daniel Grassl	(Georgia (country)) Nika Egadze	
2019	(Bosnia and Herzegovina) Sarajevo	(Russia) Ilya Yablokov	(Estonia) Mihhail Selevko	(Belarus) Yauheni Puzanau	
2022	(Finland) Vuokatti	(Estonia) Arlet Levandi	(Italy) Raffaele Francesco Zich	(Sweden) Casper Johansson	
2023	(Italy) Friuli-Venezia Giulia	(Israel) Nikita Sheiko	(Georgia (country)) Konstantin Supatashvili	(Switzerland) Naoki Rossi	

=== Women's singles ===
Year	Location	Gold	Silver	Bronze	Ref.
1993	(Italy) Aosta	(Russia) Irina Slutskaya	(Ukraine) Elena Liashenko	(France) Vanessa Gusmeroli	
1995	Andorra	(Russia) Nadezda Kanaeva	(France) Vanessa Gusmeroli	(Hungary) Krisztina Czakó	
1997	(Sweden) Sundsvall	(Russia) Julia Soldatova	(Austria) Julia Lautowa	(France) Gwenaëlle Jullien	
1999	(Slovakia) Poprad-Tatry	(Hungary) Tamara Dorofejev	(Switzerland) Sarah Meier	(Russia) Svetlana Chernishova	
2001	(Finland) Vuokatti	No figure skating competition			
2003	(Slovenia) Bled	(Germany) Katharina Häcker	(Sweden) Lina Johansson	(Hungary) Viktória Pavuk	
2005	(Switzerland) Monthey	(Russia) Angelina Turenko	(Italy) Nicole Della Monica	(Ukraine) Kateryna Proyda	
2007	(Spain) Jaca	(Spain) Sonia Lafuente	(Russia) Margarita Tertychnaya	(Italy) Marcella De Trovato	
2009	(Poland) Cieszyn	(Austria) Miriam Ziegler	(Sweden) Joshi Helgesson	(Norway) Anne Line Gjersem	
2011	(Czech Republic) Liberec	(Russia) Polina Agafonova	(Belgium) Ira Vannut	(Czech Republic) Monika Simančíková	
2013	(Romania) Brașov	(Russia) Maria Stavitskaia	(France) Anaïs Ventard	(Germany) Maria Katharina Herceg	
2015	(Austria) Dornbirn	(Russia) Alexandra Proklova	(Germany) Lea Johanna Dastich	(France) Léa Serna	
2017	(Turkey) Erzurum	(Russia) Alina Zagitova	(Ukraine) Anastasia Hozhva	(Italy) Lucrezia Gennaro	
2019	(Bosnia and Herzegovina) Sarajevo	(Russia) Anna Shcherbakova	(Italy) Lucrezia Beccari	(Ukraine) Anastasiia Arkhipova	
2022	(Finland) Vuokatti	(France) Lorine Schild	(Finland) Olivia Lisko	(Switzerland) Sarina Joos	
2023	(Italy) Friuli-Venezia Giulia	(Finland) Iida Karhunen	(Italy) Anna Pezzetta	(Poland) Noelle Streuli	

=== Pairs ===
Year	Location	Gold	Silver	Bronze	Ref.
2003	(Slovenia) Bled	(Russia) Arina Ushakova / Alexander Popov	(Germany) Rebecca Handke / Daniel Wende	(Ukraine) Julia Beloglazova / Andriy Bekh	

=== Ice dance ===
Year	Location	Gold	Silver	Bronze	Ref.
1993	(Italy) Aosta	(Poland) Sylwia Nowak / Sebastian Kolasiński	(Russia) Ekaterina Svirina / Sergei Sakhnovski	(France) Agnes Jacquemard / Alexis Gayet	
1995	Andorra	(France) Isabelle Delobel / Olivier Schoenfelder	(Poland) Jolanta Bury / Łukasz Zalewski	(Hungary) Krisztina Szabó / Tamás Sári	
1997	(Sweden) Sundsvall	(Italy) Federica Faiella / Luciano Milo	(France) Melanie Espejo / Michael Zenezini	(Switzerland) Eliane Hugentobler / Daniel Hugentobler	
1999	(Slovakia) Poprad-Tatry	(Russia) Anastasia Litvinenko / Maxim Bolotin	(Ukraine) Viktoria Polzykina / Alexander Shakalov	(France) Myriam Trividic / Aurelien Geraud	
2001	(Finland) Vuokatti	No figure skating competition			
2003	(Slovenia) Bled	(Russia) Natalia Mikhailova / Arkadi Sergeev	(Germany) Christina Beier / William Beier	(Israel) Alexandra Zaretsky / Roman Zaretsky	
2009	(Poland) Cieszyn	(Russia) Tatiana Baturintseva / Ivan Volobuiev	(Ukraine) Ruslana Yurchenko / Oleksandr Liubchenko	(Czech Republic) Gabriela Kubová / Petr Seknička	

== Cumulative medal count ==
Rank	Nation	Gold	Silver	Bronze	Total
1	Russia (RUS)	20	3	4	27
2	Hungary (HUN)	2	0	3	5
3	Ukraine (UKR)	1	7	5	13
4	France (FRA)	1	6	8	15
5	Germany (GER)	1	3	3	7
6	Italy (ITA)	1	3	2	6
7	Sweden (SWE)	1	3	1	5
8	Austria (AUT)	1	1	0	2
8	Estonia (EST)	1	1	0	2
8	Poland (POL)	1	1	0	2
11	Czech Republic (CZE)	1	0	2	3
12	Finland (FIN)	1	0	0	1
12	Spain (ESP)	1	0	0	1
14	Switzerland (SUI)	0	2	1	3
15	Georgia (GEO)	0	1	1	2
16	Belgium (BEL)	0	1	0	1
16	Latvia (LAT)	0	1	0	1
18	Belarus (BLR)	0	0	1	1
18	Israel (ISR)	0	0	1	1
18	Norway (NOR)	0	0	1	1
Totals (20 entries)		33	33	33	99
