= Gorshkovo =

Gorshkovo (Russian: Горшково) is the name of several rural localities in Russia.

== Ivanovo Oblast ==
As of 2012, four rural localities in Ivanovo Oblast bear this name:

- Gorshkovo, Ivanovsky District, Ivanovo Oblast, a village in Ivanovsky District
- Gorshkovo (Cherntskoye Rural Settlement), Lezhnevsky District, Ivanovo Oblast, a village in Lezhnevsky District; municipally, a part of Cherntskoye Rural Settlement of that district
- Gorshkovo (Sabinovskoye Rural Settlement), Lezhnevsky District, Ivanovo Oblast, a village in Lezhnevsky District; municipally, a part of Sabinovskoye Rural Settlement of that district
- Gorshkovo, Privolzhsky District, Ivanovo Oblast, a village in Privolzhsky District

== Kaluga Oblast ==
As of 2012, one rural locality in Kaluga Oblast bears this name:

- Gorshkovo, Kaluga Oblast, a village in Sukhinichsky District

== Kostroma Oblast ==
As of 2012, one rural locality in Kostroma Oblast bears this name:

- Gorshkovo, Kostroma Oblast, a village in Tsentralnoye Settlement of Buysky District; 58°14′N 41°17′E

== Kurgan Oblast ==
As of 2012, one rural locality in Kurgan Oblast bears this name:

- Gorshkovo, Kurgan Oblast, a village in Kipelsky Selsoviet of Shumikhinsky District; 55°21′N 63°1′E

== Moscow Oblast ==
As of 2012, three rural localities in Moscow Oblast bear this name:

- Gorshkovo, Dmitrovsky District, Moscow Oblast, a settlement under the administrative jurisdiction of the Town of Dmitrov in Dmitrovsky District
- Gorshkovo, Istrinsky District, Moscow Oblast, a village in Luchinskoye Rural Settlement of Istrinsky District
- Gorshkovo, Yegoryevsky District, Moscow Oblast, a village under the administrative jurisdiction of the Town of Yegoryevsk in Yegoryevsky District

== Nizhny Novgorod Oblast ==
As of 2012, one rural locality in Nizhny Novgorod Oblast bears this name:

- Gorshkovo, Nizhny Novgorod Oblast, a village under the administrative jurisdiction of the town of district significance of Knyaginino in Knyagininsky District

== Republic of Tatarstan ==
As of 2012, one rural locality in the Republic of Tatarstan bears this name:

- Gorshkovo, Republic of Tatarstan, a selo in Novosheshminsky District

== Tula Oblast ==
As of 2012, two rural localities in Tula Oblast bear this name:

- Gorshkovo, Venyovsky District, Tula Oblast, a village in Mordvessky Rural Okrug of Venyovsky District
- Gorshkovo, Yasnogorsky District, Tula Oblast, a selo in Burakovskaya Rural Territory of Yasnogorsky District

== Tver Oblast ==
As of 2012, seven rural localities in Tver Oblast bear this name:

- Gorshkovo, Firovsky District, Tver Oblast, a village in Firovskoye Rural Settlement of Firovsky District
- Gorshkovo, Likhoslavlsky District, Tver Oblast, a village in Kavskoye Rural Settlement of Likhoslavlsky District
- Gorshkovo, Seletskoye Rural Settlement, Maksatikhinsky District, Tver Oblast, a village in Seletskoye Rural Settlement of Maksatikhinsky District
- Gorshkovo, Truzhenitskoye Rural Settlement, Maksatikhinsky District, Tver Oblast, a village in Truzhenitskoye Rural Settlement of Maksatikhinsky District
- Gorshkovo, Rzhevsky District, Tver Oblast, a village in Uspenskoye Rural Settlement of Rzhevsky District
- Gorshkovo, Torzhoksky District, Tver Oblast, a village in Bolshepetrovskoye Rural Settlement of Torzhoksky District
- Gorshkovo, Zubtsovsky District, Tver Oblast, a village in Vazuzskoye Rural Settlement of Zubtsovsky District

== Vladimir Oblast ==
As of 2012, one rural locality in Vladimir Oblast bears this name:

- Gorshkovo, Vladimir Oblast, a village in Gorokhovetsky District

== Vologda Oblast ==
As of 2012, three rural localities in Vologda Oblast bear this name:

- Gorshkovo, Ust-Kubinsky District, Vologda Oblast, a village in Troitsky Selsoviet of Ust-Kubinsky District
- Gorshkovo, Velikoustyugsky District, Vologda Oblast, a village in Mardengsky Selsoviet of Velikoustyugsky District
- Gorshkovo, Vologodsky District, Vologda Oblast, a village in Raboche-Krestyansky Selsoviet of Vologodsky District

== Yaroslavl Oblast ==
As of 2012, two rural localities in Yaroslavl Oblast bear this name:

- Gorshkovo, Borisoglebsky District, Yaroslavl Oblast, a village in Krasnooktyabrsky Rural Okrug of Borisoglebsky District
- Gorshkovo, Nekouzsky District, Yaroslavl Oblast, a village in Rodionovsky Rural Okrug of Nekouzsky District

== See also ==
- Gorshkov, a surname
