= Admiral Gorshkov =

Admiral Gorshkov may refer to:

- Sergey Gorshkov (1910–1988), Soviet admiral
- Soviet aircraft carrier Admiral Gorshkov
- Admiral Gorshkov-class frigate
  - Russian frigate Admiral Gorshkov
- Russian ship Admiral Gorshkov, a Russian navy ship name

== See also ==
- Sergey Gorshkov (general) (1902-1993), Soviet general
- Admiral (disambiguation)
- Gorshkov
