= Michal Březina =

Czech figure skater

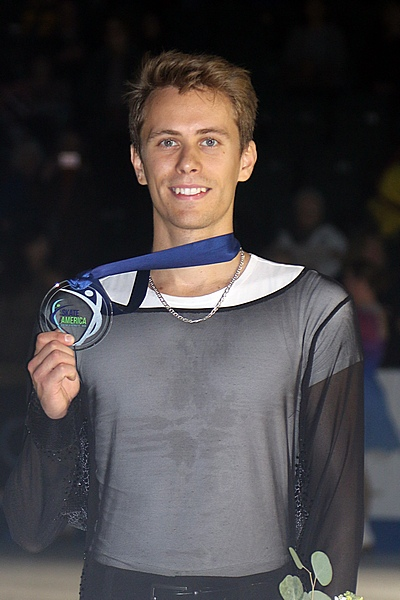
- Březina on the podium at 2018 Skate America

Personal information
- Born: 30 March 1990 (age 36) Brno, Czechoslovakia
- Home town: Irvine, California, United States
- Height: 1.72 m (5 ft 8 in)

Figure skating career
- Country: Czech Republic
- Discipline: Men's singles
- Began skating: 1997
- Retired: February 8, 2022
- Highest WS: 3rd (2011–12)

Medal record
European Championships
Bronze medal – third place	2013 Zagreb	Singles
Czech Championships
Gold medal – first place	2010 Cieszyn	Singles
Gold medal – first place	2015 Budapest	Singles
Gold medal – first place	2016 Třinec	Singles
Silver medal – second place	2008 Trenčín	Singles
Silver medal – second place	2011 Žilina	Singles
Silver medal – second place	2012 Ostrava	Singles
Silver medal – second place	2014 Bratislava	Singles
World Junior Championships
Silver medal – second place	2009 Sofia	Singles

Michal Březina (Czech pronunciation: [ˈmɪxal ˈbr̝ɛzɪna]; born 30 March 1990) is a retired Czech figure skater. He is the 2013 European bronze medalist, 2011 Skate America champion, 2009 World Junior silver medalist and four-time Czech national champion. He also won the 2014-15 ISU Challenger Series. He represented the Czech Republic at the 2010, 2014, 2018, and 2022 Winter Olympics.

== Personal life ==
Michal Březina was born on 30 March 1990 in Brno. He is the son of Edita Březinová and Rudolf Březina, a figure skating coach. His younger sister, Eliška Březinová, competes in ladies' single skating. At the age of 18 he intended to study sports at university and eventually become a skating coach.

Březina was the best man at the wedding of Anna Cappellini and Ondřej Hotárek in the summer of 2015.

On 19 May 2015, Brezina announced his engagement to his girlfriend, fellow figure skater, Danielle Montalbano. They were married on 10 June 2017. The couple have two children: a daughter, Naya Rose (born 2020) and a son, Noah Michal (born 2022).

== Career ==
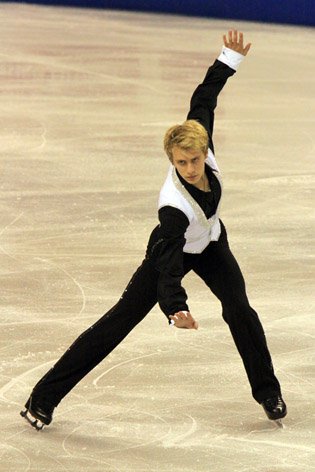
Březina at the 2009 Skate Canada

=== Early years ===
Březina was initially interested in ice hockey after watching the 1998 Winter Olympics, but his father advised him to learn to skate first, and after a few months, he dropped hockey to focus on figure skating.

Březina first landed a triple Salchow at the age of 12, and a triple Axel at 15. In practice, he has worked on a quad toe loop and quad Salchow. He trained in his hometown of Brno with coach Petr Starec and in Oberstdorf, Germany with Karel Fajfr.

=== 2007–2008 season ===
Březina won the 2007 Nebelhorn Trophy over compatriot and reigning champion, Tomáš Verner. Two weeks later, he won his first Junior Grand Prix medal, a silver, in Chemnitz. Březina placed sixteenth at his first European Championships. He missed training time because of a broken wrist but was able to compete at the World Junior Championships, where he was fifth.

=== 2008–2009 season ===
Březina won both his junior Grand Prix events but was forced to miss the Junior Grand Prix Final and the Czech national championships due to a right knee injury that required surgery. He returned in time for the 2009 Europeans, where he finished tenth, and then set a new personal best at the 2009 Junior Worlds to win the silver medal behind Adam Rippon.

=== 2009–2010 season ===
Březina debuted on the senior Grand Prix circuit, finishing fourth at the 2009 Skate Canada International. He won the bronze medal at 2009 NHK Trophy and defeated Tomáš Verner to win the Czech Championship. He finished 4th at the 2010 European Championships. At the 2010 Olympics in Vancouver he came in tenth. Competing at his first senior World Championships, he earned a fourth-place finish with a new personal best score of 236.06.

=== 2010–2011 season ===
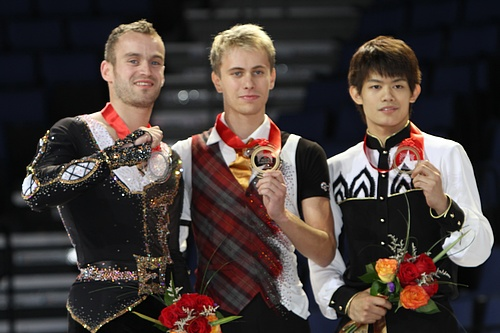
Brezina with the other medalists at the 2011 Skate America

Březina was forced to withdraw from the 2010 Cup of China after undergoing surgery for a varicose vein in his abdomen. He later withdrew from the 2010 Trophée Eric Bompard as well. He took silver behind Verner at the Czech Championships. At the 2011 European Championships, Březina placed second in the short program but dropped to eighth overall following the free skate. At the 2011 World Championships, he successfully landed two quads, a Salchow and a toe loop, in the long program – his first quads landed in competition – but fell on two jumps toward the end of the program. He finished fourth at the event for the second straight year.

=== 2011–2012 season ===
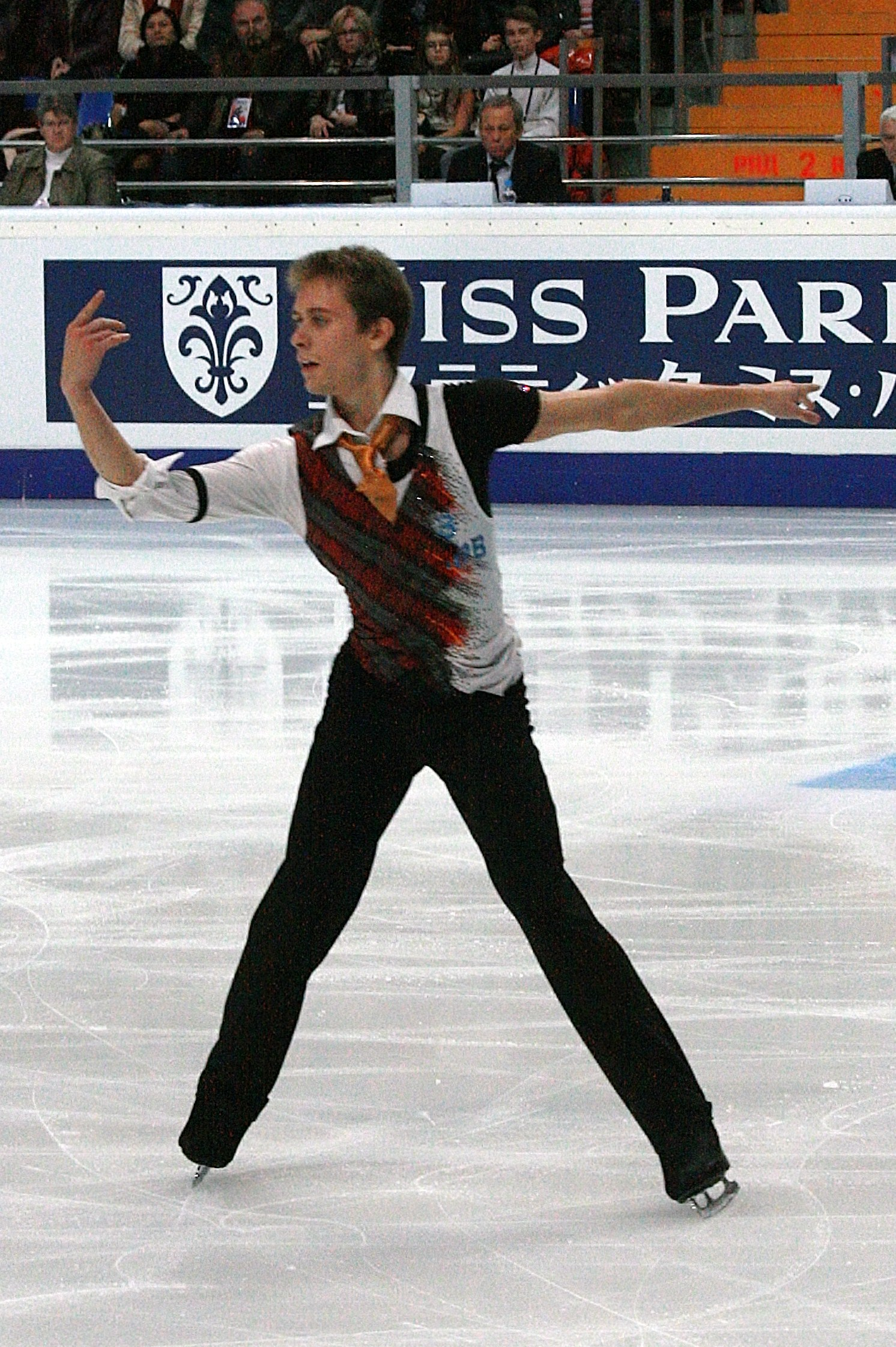
Březina at the 2012 Rostelecom Cup

Březina experienced some boot problems during the off-season. He trained mainly in Oberstdorf. He began his season at 2011 Nebelhorn Trophy where he won the silver medal. Skaters who had placed in the top six at the 2011 Worlds were given a newly introduced option of competing at three Grand Prix events. Březina elected to do so and was assigned to 2011 Skate America, 2011 Trophée Eric Bompard, and 2011 Cup of Russia. At Skate America, he won the short program by 8.39 points and placed third in the free skate to win the gold medal overall. Březina won the bronze medal in France, which qualified him for the Grand Prix Final. He then placed fourth in the Cup of Russia. He was sixth at the Grand Prix Final. At the 2012 World Championships, Březina picked up a small silver medal for the short program and finished sixth overall after the free skate. In April 2012, he changed coaches from Starec and Fajfr to Viktor Petrenko. He trained at the Ice House in Hackensack, New Jersey.

=== 2012–2013 season ===
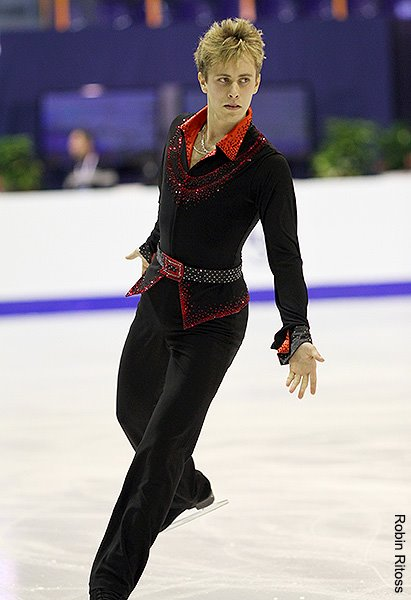
Březina at the 2013 European Championships

Březina finished sixth at 2012 Skate America and won the bronze medal at the 2012 Rostelecom Cup. He withdrew from the Czech Championships due to a fever. He dislocated his shoulder during practice on 21 January at the 2013 European Championships but went on to win bronze, his first European medal.

=== 2013–2014 season ===
In February 2014, Březina placed tenth at the Winter Olympics in Sochi, Russia. His next event was the 2014 World Championships in Saitama, Japan. He withdrew after the short program on 26 March, having pulled ligaments in his right ankle on the triple flip take-off. His ankle was immediately put into a cast, and he recovered in two weeks. Due to the high cost of training in the United States, he decided in June 2014 to rejoin Karel Fajfr in Oberstdorf.

=== 2014–2015 season ===
Březina began the season with two silver medals at his Challenger events, the Golden Spin of Zagreb and Nebelhorn Trophy/ After finishing seventh at the 2014 Skate Canada International, he won the bronze medal at the 2014 Rostelecom Cup. He placed fifth at the 2015 European Championships and fifteenth at the 2015 World Championships.

=== 2015–2016 season ===
His first event of the season was the 2015 Lombardia Trophy, which was not a Challenger event for that particular season. Following a sixth-place finish at Nebelhorn, Brezina placed eighth and seventh at these two Grand Prix assignments, Skate Canada International and the NHK Trophy. He went on to place tenth at Europeans and ninth at Worlds.

In the spring of 2016, Březina decided to train with Rafael Arutyunyan in California.

=== 2016–2017 season ===
Březina placed fourth at Skate Canada International and tenth at the Cup of China.

In December 2016, he placed first in the short program at the Four Nationals; he withdrew after injuring his arm during the free skate. He placed twelfth at Europeans.

Březina twisted his ankle three weeks before the 2017 World Championships in Helsinki. He finished eighteenth at the event in Finland, earning a spot for the Czech Republic at the 2018 Winter Olympics.

=== 2017–2018 season ===
Beginning with two events on the Challenger Series, Březina placed ninth at the U.S. International Classic and sixth at the Finlandia Trophy. He went on to place sixth at Skate Canada International and ninth at NHK Trophy.

Following an eighth-place finish at Europeans, Březina competed at his third Olympic Games in Pyeongchang, South Korea. He placed sixteenth. The season concluded at the 2018 World Championships in Milan, Italy, where he placed tenth, setting a new personal best in the free skate.

=== 2018–2019 season ===
Březina began the season with a silver medal at the 2018 U.S. International Classic, his first Challenger Series medal in four years. He followed that up with a silver medal at the 2018 Skate America event, his first Grand Prix medal since his bronze at Rostelecom four years earlier. At his second Grand Prix event, the 2018 Grand Prix of Helsinki, he set new personal bests in the short program and overall score to win a second silver medal.

His results qualified him for the Grand Prix Final, only the second time in his career he had done so and the first time in seven years. Březina placed fourth at the Final, finishing 8.23 points behind Cha Jun-hwan after doubling a jump in his short program and falling on a quad Salchow in the free skate. At the European Championships he placed eighth in the short program and moved up to seventh overall after placing sixth in the free program.

Finishing his season at the 2019 World Championships, Březina placed eighth in the short program. He remained in eighth place following the free skate, despite a single fall on a triple flip attempt.

=== 2019–2020 season ===
Březina opted not to begin his season with a Challenger event, instead competing at the 2019 Shanghai Trophy, where he placed fourth. Returning to Skate America, he placed fifth in the short program despite jump errors. After doubling numerous jumps in his free skate, he fell to eleventh place. He was ninth at the 2019 Rostelecom Cup.

Competing at the 2020 European Championships, Březina placed first in the short program despite performing only a quad-double in his combination jump, winning a gold small medal. He said he was undecided about whether it would be his final competition. He fell twice in the free skate on quad Salchow attempts, placing eleventh in that segment and falling to seventh place overall. He was scheduled to compete at the 2020 World Championships in Montreal, but these were cancelled as a result of the COVID-19 pandemic.

=== 2020–2021 season ===
Březina was assigned to compete at the 2020 Skate America but withdrew due to a fall in training. He was allowed to submit virtual competitive programs to the 2021 Four National Championships, winning the gold medal. His only live event of the season was the 2021 World Championships in Stockholm, where he placed nineteenth. This result qualified one berth for the Czech Republic at the 2022 Winter Olympics in Beijing.

=== 2021–2022 season ===
Březina opened his season with a win at the 2021 U.S. International Classic. Following the results of the 2021 CS Nebelhorn Trophy, he was announced as part of the Czech Olympic team, this time alongside his sister Eliška. Competing on the Grand Prix at the 2021 Skate America, he finished in sixth. At the 2021 Rostelecom Cup, he finished in tenth place. Discussing his results afterward, he cited his work with a mental coach as having improved his mindset, noting, "I wish I would have worked with a mental coach when I was younger. Maybe my career would have looked different."

At the 2022 European Championships, Březina had a poor short program and finished in fifteenth place in that segment. He was fifth in the free skate, rising to tenth place overall.

Březina began the 2022 Winter Olympics as the Czech entry in the men's short program of the Olympic team event. He placed seventh in the segment, securing four points for the Czech team. They ultimately did not advance to the second phase of the competition, finishing eighth. In the individual event, he placed twenty-fifth in the short program, not advancing to the free program. He announced his retirement shortly after the event.

== Programs ==
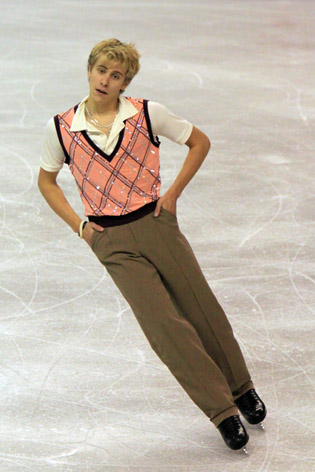
Březina at the 2009 Skate Canada

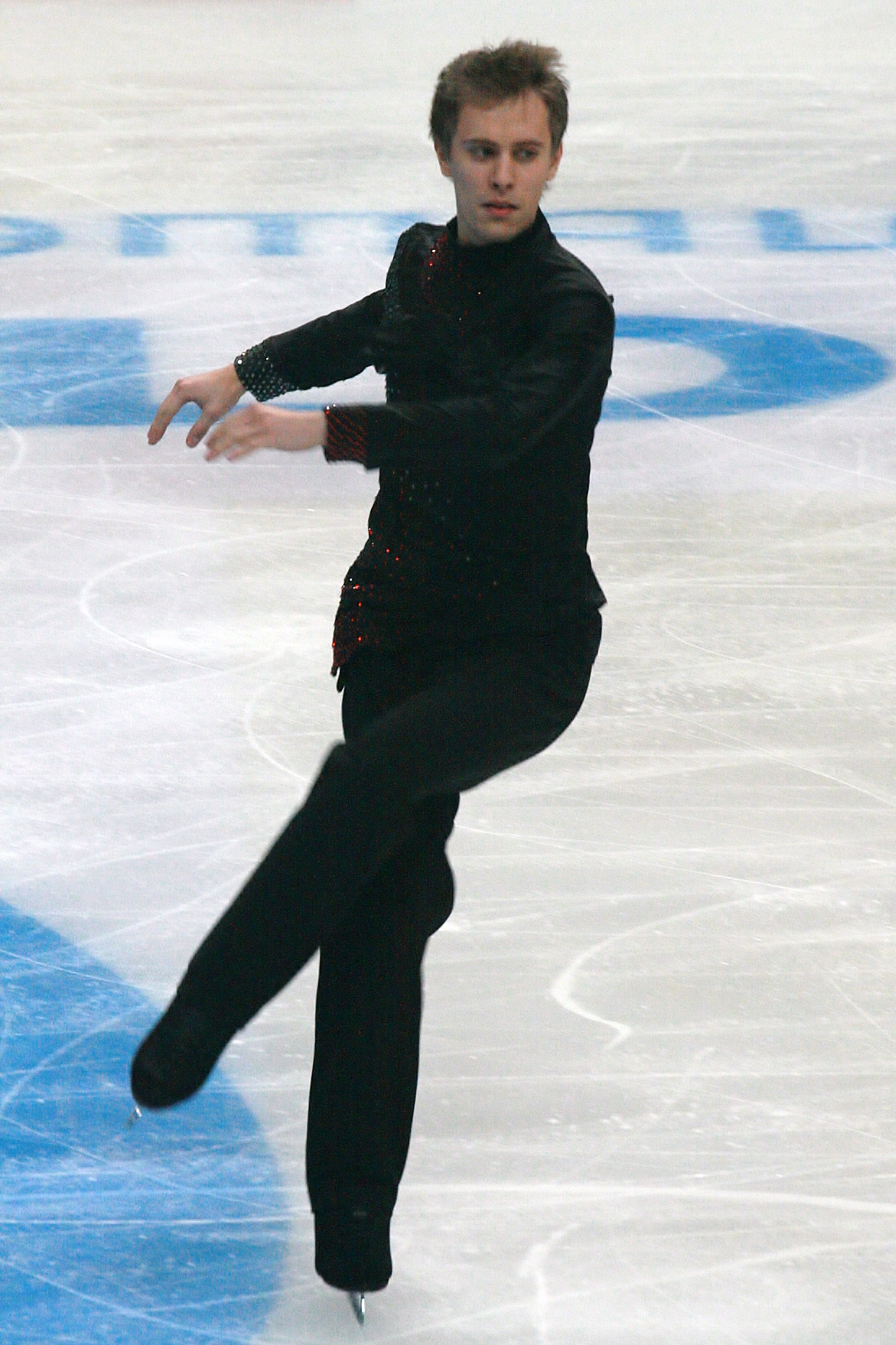
Březina at the 2012 Rostelecom Cup

Season	Short program	Free skating	Exhibition
2020–2022	Baby Did a Bad Bad Thing by Chris Isaak choreo. by Shae-Lynn Bourne	Summer of '69; Run to You; Heaven; You Belong to Me by Bryan Adams choreo. by Nadezhda Kanaeva	Go Down Rockin' by Bryan Adams
2019–2020	Baby Did a Bad Bad Thing by Chris Isaak choreo. by Shae-Lynn Bourne	Yesterday; I Saw Her Standing There; Let It Be; A Hard Day's Night by The Beatles choreo. by Nadezhda Kanaeva	
2018–2019	Who Wants to Live Forever by Queen	I'm a Man by The Spencer Davis Group w; Thunderstruck by AC/DC	
2017–2018	Japanese Kodo Drums choreo. by Pasquale Camerlengo	Human by Jamie Hartman, Rory Graham; Stand by Me by Ben E. King, Jerry Leiber and Mike Stoller covered by Bootstraps; Human (MJ Cole remix) choreo. by Benoît Richaud	Nobody but Me by Michael Bublé
2016–2017	The Way You Look Tonight by Jerome Kern, Dorothy Fields performed by Frank Sinatra choreo. by Jeffrey Buttle	Once Upon a Time (remix) by Ennio Morricone choreo. by Tom Dickson: Man With A Harmonica (from Once Upon a Time in The West); Cockeye's Story (from Once Upon a Time in America); Ecstasy of Gold (from The Good, the Bad and the Ugly); Main Theme (from Once Upon a Time in America); La classe operaia va in paradiso; The Untouchables	Blue Suede Shoes by Elvis Presley
2015–2016	The Way You Look Tonight by Jerome Kern, Dorothy Fields performed by Frank Sinatra choreo. by Jeffrey Buttle	Le Corsaire by Adolphe Adam choreo. by Salomé Brunner, Stéphane Lambiel	
2014–2015	Game of Thrones: Main Title (cello version) by Ramin Djawadi	The Marriage of Figaro by Wolfgang Amadeus Mozart choreo. by Salomé Brunner	Wonderwall by Oasis performed by Paul Anka
2013–2014	In the Hall of the Mountain King by Edvard Grieg performed by Epica choreo. by Pasquale Camerlengo	Sherlock Holmes by Hans Zimmer	Suit & Tie by Justin Timberlake
2012–2013	In the Hall of the Mountain King by Edvard Grieg performed by Epica choreo. by Pasquale Camerlengo	The Untouchables by Ennio Morricone (new arrangement) choreo. by Pasquale Camerlengo	New York, New York remix
2011–2012	Japanese Kodo Drums choreo. by Pasquale Camerlengo	The Untouchables by Ennio Morricone (new arrangement) choreo. by Pasquale Camerlengo	All That You Are by Goo Goo Dolls
2010–2011	Japanese Kodo Drums choreo. by Pasquale Camerlengo	An American in Paris by George Gershwin	Feeling Good by Michael Bublé
2009–2010	Puttin' On the Ritz by Irving Berlin	An American in Paris by George Gershwin	Feeling Good by Michael Bublé
2007–2009	Sing, Sing, Sing by Louis Prima	Latin Dance selections by Safri Duo	Singin' in the Rain by Nacio Herb Brown performed by Arthur Freed
2006–2007	Quidam (from Cirque du Soleil)	The Matrix	

== Competitive highlights ==
- GP – Event of the ISU Grand Prix Series
- JGP – Event of the ISU Junior Grand Prix Series
- CS – Event of the ISU Challenger Series
- WD – Withdrew from competition
- C – Event was cancelled
- Medals at team events are awarded for the team results only. Individual placements at team events are listed in parentheses.

Competition placements at senior level
Season	2007–08	2008–09	2009–10	2010–11	2011–12	2012–13	2013–14	2014–15	2015–16	2016–17	2017–18	2018–19	2019–20	2020–21	2021–22
Winter Olympics			10th				10th				16th				25th
Winter Olympics (Team event)															8th
Worlds Championships			4th	4th	6th	10th	WD	15th	9th	18th	10th	8th	C	19th	
European Championships	16th	10th	4th	8th	4th	3rd	4th	5th	10th	12th	8th	7th	7th		10th
Grand Prix Final					6th							4th			
Czech Championships	3rd	3rd		1st	2nd	WD	2nd	1st	1st	WD			1st		
GP Cup of China										10th					
GP Finland												2nd			
GP NHK Trophy			3rd						7th		9th				
GP Rostelecom Cup					4th	3rd		3rd					9th		10th
GP Skate America					1st	6th						2nd	11th		6th
GP Skate Canada			4th				4th	7th	8th	4th	6th				
GP Trophée Éric Bompard					3rd		5th								
CS Finlandia Trophy			4th						5th		6th				
CS Golden Spin of Zagreb				2nd				2nd							
CS Nebelhorn Trophy	1st	2nd	3rd	7th	2nd	5th		2nd	6th						
CS U.S. Classic											9th	2nd			1st
Bavarian Open				1st											
Cup of Nice									4th						
Hellmut Seibt Memorial								1st	2nd						
Japan Open				3rd (5th)		3rd (5th)	3rd (6th)								
Lombardia Trophy									2nd						
NRW Trophy						2nd									
Shanghai Trophy													4th		
Slovenia Open							1st								
Team Challenge Cup									2nd (5th)						
Winter Universiade										7th					

Competition placements at junior level
Season	2004–05	2005–06	2006–07	2007–08	2008–09
World Junior Championships			16th	5th	2nd
Czech Championships	1st	1st	1st		
JGP Austria				7th	
JGP Czech Republic			16th		
JGP France					1st
JGP Germany				2nd	
JGP Hungary	12th				
JGP Italy					1st
JGP Netherlands			5th		
European Youth Olympic Festival	7th				
Gardena Spring Trophy		3rd	2nd		
Golden Spin of Zagreb			5th S		

== Detailed results ==
ISU personal best scores in the +5/-5 GOE System
Segment	Type	Score	Event
Total	TSS	257.98	2018 Grand Prix of Helsinki
Short program	TSS	93.31	2018 Grand Prix of Helsinki
Short program	TES	51.14	2018 Grand Prix of Helsinki
Short program	PCS	43.07	2018–19 Grand Prix Final
Free skating	TSS	167.32	2019 World Championships
Free skating	TES	83.34	2022 European Championships
Free skating	PCS	87.38	2018–19 Grand Prix Final

ISU personal best scores in the +3/-3 GOE System
Segment	Type	Score	Event
Total	TSS	246.07	2018 Winter Olympics
Short program	TSS	87.67	2012 World Championships
Short program	TES	48.70	2012 World Championships
Short program	PCS	41.04	2015 NHK Trophy
Free skating	TSS	165.98	2018 World Championships
Free skating	TES	84.02	2013 European Championships
Free skating	PCS	84.34	2018 Winter Olympics

=== Senior level ===
Results in the 2006–07 season
Date	Event	SP		FS		Total	
Date	Event	P	Score	P	Score	P	Score
Nov 16–19, 2006	(Croatia) 2006 Golden Spin of Zagreb	7	44.17	4	91.24	5	135.41

Results in the 2007–08 season
Date	Event	SP		FS		Total	
Date	Event	P	Score	P	Score	P	Score
Sep 27–30, 2007	(Germany) 2007 Nebelhorn Trophy	3	61.30	1	124.25	1	185.55
Dec 14–16, 2007	(Slovakia) 2008 Czech Championships	2	66.66	4	105.10	3	171.76
Jan 21–27, 2008	(Croatia) 2008 European Championships	14	54.13	15	106.24	16	160.37

Results in the 2008–09 season
Date	Event	SP		FS		Total	
Date	Event	P	Score	P	Score	P	Score
Sep 25–29, 2008	(Germany) 2008 Nebelhorn Trophy	2	75.84	2	144.45	2	220.29
Jan 20–25, 2009	(Finland) 2009 European Championships	17	59.35	8	123.84	10	183.19

Results in the 2009–10 season
Date	Event	SP		FS		Total	
Date	Event	P	Score	P	Score	P	Score
Sep 23–26, 2009	(Germany) 2009 Nebelhorn Trophy	2	73.23	3	132.11	3	205.34
Oct 8–11, 2009	(Finland) 2009 Finlandia Trophy	6	62.89	4	127.42	4	190.31
Nov 5–8, 2009	(Japan) 2009 NHK Trophy	6	70.80	2	146.68	3	217.48
Nov 19–22, 2009	2009 Skate Canada International	5	71.92	5	130.40	4	202.32
Jan 18–24, 2010	(Estonia) 2010 European Championships	4	79.60	5	145.14	4	224.74
Feb 12–27, 2010	(Canada) 2010 Winter Olympics	9	78.80	11	137.93	10	216.73
Mar 22–28, 2010	(Italy) 2010 World Championships	5	81.75	3	154.31	4	241.74

Results in the 2010–11 season
Date	Event	SP		FS		Total	
Date	Event	P	Score	P	Score	P	Score
Sep 21–24, 2010	(Germany) 2010 Nebelhorn Trophy	9	55.40	5	128.91	7	184.31
Oct 2, 2010	2010 Japan Open	–	–	3	134.90	3 (5)	–
Dec 8–12, 2010	(Croatia) 2010 Golden Spin of Zagreb	1	55.44	2	128.20	2	183.64
Dec 16–18, 2010	(Poland) 2010 Czech Championships	1	75.05	1	148.48	1	223.53
Jan 24–30, 2011	(Switzerland) 2011 European Championships	2	76.13	10	125.26	8	201.39
Feb 11–15, 2011	(Germany) 2011 Bavarian Open	1	73.01	2	122.59	1	195.60
Apr 24 – May 1, 2011	(Russia) 2011 World Championships	7	77.50	5	156.11	4	233.61

Results in the 2011–12 season
Date	Event	SP		FS		Total	
Date	Event	P	Score	P	Score	P	Score
Sep 21–24, 2011	(Germany) 2011 Nebelhorn Trophy	4	69.77	2	145.23	2	215.00
Oct 21–23, 2011	(United States) 2011 Skate America	1	79.08	1	136.92	1	216.00
Nov 18–20, 2011	(France) 2011 Trophée Éric Bompard	3	74.32	4	144.28	3	218.00
Nov 25–27, 2011	(Russia) 2011 Rostelecom Cup	3	79.01	3	147.34	4	226.35
Dec 8–11, 2011	(Canada) 2011–12 Grand Prix Final	6	75.26	6	143.72	6	218.98
Dec 15–18, 2011	(Slovakia) 2011 Czech Championships	1	72.12	2	135.45	2	207.57
Feb 7–12, 2012	(United Kingdom) 2012 European Championships	6	76.13	4	153.17	4	229.30
Mar 26 – Apr 1, 2012	(France) 2012 World Championships	2	87.67	7	151.88	6	239.55

Results in the 2012–13 season
Date	Event	SP		FS		Total	
Date	Event	P	Score	P	Score	P	Score
Sep 27–29, 2012	(Germany) 2012 Nebelhorn Trophy	5	67.78	7	133.93	5	201.71
Oct 6, 2012	2012 Japan Open	–	–	5	151.53	3 (5)	–
Oct 19–21, 2012	(United States) 2012 Skate America	6	69.26	4	140.41	6	209.67
Nov 9–11, 2012	(Russia) 2012 Rostelecom Cup	6	73.83	4	150.73	3	224.56
Dec 5–9, 2012	(Germany) 2012 NRW Trophy	2	70.29	5	142.80	2	213.09
Dec 14–16, 2012	(Poland) 2013 Czech Championships	2	71.65	–	–	–	WD
Jan 23–27, 2013	(Croatia) 2013 European Championships	4	79.84	2	163.68	3	243.52
Mar 10–17, 2013	(Canada) 2013 World Championships	6	83.09	11	145.91	10	229.00

Results in the 2013–14 season
Date	Event	SP		FS		Total	
Date	Event	P	Score	P	Score	P	Score
Aug 31 – Sep 1, 2013	2013 Slovenia Open	1	71.49	2	125.83	1	197.32
Oct 5, 2013	2013 Japan Open	–	–	6	125.74	3 (6)	–
Oct 24–27, 2013	2013 Skate Canada International	7	71.71	5	146.61	4	218.32
Nov 15–17, 2013	(France) 2013 Trophée Éric Bompard	6	71.91	4	134.31	5	206.22
Dec 20–22, 2013	(Poland) 2013 Czech Championships	2	72.81	2	136.59	2	209.40
Jan 15–19, 2014	(Hungary) 2014 European Championships	5	82.80	4	154.18	4	236.98
Feb 13–14, 2014	(Russia) 2014 Winter Olympics	13	81.95	13	151.67	10	233.62
Mar 24–30, 2014	(Japan) 2014 World Championships	23	62.25	–	–	–	WD

Results in the 2014–15 season
Date	Event	SP		FS		Total	
Date	Event	P	Score	P	Score	P	Score
Sep 24–27, 2014	(Germany) 2014 CS Nebelhorn Trophy	2	78.27	2	150.21	2	228.48
Oct 31 – Nov 2, 2014	2014 Skate Canada International	7	73.29	8	134.95	7	208.24
Nov 14–16, 2014	(Russia) 2014 Rostelecom Cup	4	80.89	3	160.34	3	241.23
Dec 4–7, 2014	(Croatia) 2014 CS Golden Spin of Zagreb	3	81.62	1	158.00	2	239.62
Dec 18–21, 2014	(Slovakia) 2014 Czech Championships	1	71.97	1	138.72	1	210.69
Jan 26 – Feb 1, 2015	(Sweden) 2015 European Championships	3	80.86	7	139.25	5	220.11
Feb 25–28, 2015	(Austria) 2015 Hellmut Seibt Memorial	2	70.48	1	159.97	1	230.45
Mar 23–29, 2015	(China) 2015 World Championships	10	76.84	15	136.99	15	213.84

Results in the 2015–16 season
Date	Event	SP		FS		Total	
Date	Event	P	Score	P	Score	P	Score
Sep 17–20, 2015	(Italy) 2015 Lombardia Trophy	4	62.54	1	143.67	2	206.21
Sep 24–26, 2015	(Germany) 2015 CS Nebelhorn Trophy	3	74.12	6	129.49	6	203.61
Oct 9–11, 2015	(Finland) 2015 CS Finlandia Trophy	5	67.48	4	137.58	5	205.06
Oct 15–18, 2015	(France) 2015 International Cup of Nice	4	74.21	4	141.34	4	215.55
Oct 30 – Nov 1, 2015	2015 Skate Canada International	5	75.46	8	143.12	8	218.58
Nov 27–29, 2015	(Japan) 2015 NHK Trophy	5	81.64	9	140.85	7	222.49
Dec 18–20, 2015	(Hungary) 2015 Czech Championships	1	68.83	1	154.72	1	223.55
Jan 26–31, 2016	(Slovakia) 2016 European Championships	3	84.30	13	127.51	10	211.81
Feb 23–27, 2016	(Austria) 2016 Hellmut Seibt Memorial	1	73.64	2	138.92	2	212.56
Mar 28 – Apr 3, 2016	(United States) 2016 World Championships	11	79.29	10	158.70	9	237.99
Apr 22–24, 2016	(United States) 2016 Team Challenge Cup	8	64.54	5	158.30	2 (5)	–

Results in the 2016–17 season
Date	Event	SP		FS		Total	
Date	Event	P	Score	P	Score	P	Score
Oct 28–30, 2016	2016 Skate Canada International	9	70.36	4	157.06	4	227.42
Nov 18–20, 2016	2016 Cup of China	7	75.87	9	135.91	10	211.77
Dec 16–17, 2016	(Poland) 2017 Czech Championships	1	73.61	–	–	–	WD
Jan 25–29, 2017	(Czech Republic) 2017 European Championships	8	78.61	13	136.91	12	215.52
Feb 1–5, 2017	(Kazakhstan) 2017 Winter Universiade	8	75.57	8	149.48	7	225.05
Mar 29 – Apr 2, 2017	(Finland) 2017 World Championships	15	80.02	18	146.24	18	226.26

Results in the 2017–18 season
Date	Event	SP		FS		Total	
Date	Event	P	Score	P	Score	P	Score
Sep 13–17, 2017	(United States) 2017 CS U.S. International Classic	7	75.78	11	118.17	9	193.95
Oct 6–8, 2017	(Finland) 2017 CS Finlandia Trophy	5	77.26	5	156.02	6	233.28
Oct 27–29, 2017	2017 Skate Canada International	7	80.34	4	156.70	6	237.04
Nov 10–12, 2017	(Japan) 2017 NHK Trophy	9	76.24	10	144.21	9	220.45
Jan 15–21, 2018	(Russia) 2018 European Championships	10	72.72	8	152.48	8	225.20
Feb 16–17, 2018	(South Korea) 2018 Winter Olympics	9	85.15	18	160.92	16	246.07
Mar 19–25, 2018	(Italy) 2018 World Championships	17	78.01	8	165.98	10	243.99

Results in the 2018–19 season
Date	Event	SP		FS		Total	
Date	Event	P	Score	P	Score	P	Score
Sep 12–16, 2018	(United States) 2018 CS U.S. International Classic	2	79.57	4	128.70	2	208.27
Oct 19–21, 2018	(United States) 2018 Skate America	2	82.09	2	157.42	2	239.51
Nov 2–4, 2018	(Finland) 2018 Grand Prix of Helsinki	2	93.31	2	164.67	2	257.98
Dec 6–9, 2018	(Canada) 2018–19 Grand Prix Final	3	89.21	4	166.05	4	255.26
Jan 21–27, 2019	(Belarus) 2019 European Championships	8	83.66	6	150.59	7	234.25
Mar 18–24, 2019	(Japan) 2019 World Championships	8	86.96	8	167.32	8	254.28

Results in the 2019–20 season
Date	Event	SP		FS		Total	
Date	Event	P	Score	P	Score	P	Score
Oct 3–5, 2019	(China) 2019 Shanghai Trophy	4	74.94	4	143.54	4	218.48
Oct 18–20, 2019	(United States) 2019 Skate America	5	81.11	11	132.06	11	213.17
Nov 15–17, 2019	(Russia) 2019 Rostelecom Cup	8	80.27	8	156.20	9	236.47
Dec 13–14, 2019	(Czech Republic) 2020 Czech Championships	1	82.95	1	164.58	1	247.53
Jan 20–26, 2020	(Austria) 2020 European Championships	1	89.77	11	141.48	7	231.25

Results in the 2020–21 season
Date	Event	SP		FS		Total	
Date	Event	P	Score	P	Score	P	Score
Mar 22–28, 2021	(Sweden) 2021 World Championships	13	81.43	21	129.30	19	210.73

Results in the 2021–22 season
Date	Event	SP		FS		Total	
Date	Event	P	Score	P	Score	P	Score
Sep 15–19, 2021	(United States) 2021 U.S. International Classic	1	87.48	1	151.17	1	238.65
Oct 22–24, 2021	(United States) 2021 Skate America	6	75.43	5	152.04	6	227.47
Nov 26–28, 2021	(Russia) 2021 Rostelecom Cup	6	82.31	11	137.28	10	219.59
Jan 10–16, 2022	(Estonia) 2022 European Championships	15	71.60	5	166.78	10	238.38
Feb 4–7, 2022	(China) 2022 Winter Olympics (Team event)	7	76.77	—	—	8	—
Feb 8—10, 2022	(China) 2022 Winter Olympics	25	75.19	—	—	25	75.19

Results in the 2022–23 season
Date	Event	SP		FS		Total	
Date	Event	P	Score	P	Score	P	Score
Oct 8, 2022	2022 Japan Open	—	—	6	98.26	3	—

=== Junior level ===
Results in the 2004–05 season
Date	Event	SP		FS		Total	
Date	Event	P	Score	P	Score	P	Score
Sep 1–5, 2004	2004 JGP Hungary	12	43.23	9	84.05	12	127.28
Jan 22–29, 2005	(Switzerland) 2005 European Youth Olympic Festival	8	–	7	–	7	–

Results in the 2005–06 season
Date	Event	SP		FS		Total	
Date	Event	P	Score	P	Score	P	Score
Mar 28–31, 2006	(Italy) 2006 Gardena Spring Trophy					3	

Results in the 2006–07 season
Date	Event	SP		FS		Total	
Date	Event	P	Score	P	Score	P	Score
Oct 5–7, 2006	2006 JGP Netherlands	7	48.06	6	99.33	5	147.39
Oct 19–22, 2006	2006 JGP Czech Republic	6	52.56	17	69.23	16	121.79
Dec 15–18, 2005	(Czech Republic) 2006 Czech Championships (Junior)	1	47.53	1	95.15	1	142.68
Feb 26 – Mar 4, 2007	(Germany) 2007 World Junior Championships	19	50.36	16	92.97	16	143.33

Results in the 2007–08 season
Date	Event	SP		FS		Total	
Date	Event	P	Score	P	Score	P	Score
Sep 13–16, 2007	2007 JGP Austria	8	51.62	8	103.58	7	155.20
Oct 11–14, 2007	2007 JGP Germany	1	61.77	2	114.66	2	176.43
Feb 25 – Mar 2, 2008	(Bulgaria) 2008 World Junior Championships	5	62.11	6	122.29	5	184.40

Results in the 2008–09 season
Date	Event	SP		FS		Total	
Date	Event	P	Score	P	Score	P	Score
Aug 27–31, 2008	2008 JGP France	1	63.13	1	119.59	1	182.72
Sep 3–6, 2008	2008 JGP Italy	3	63.52	1	128.96	1	192.48
Feb 22 – Mar 1, 2009	(Bulgaria) 2009 World Junior Championships	2	69.55	2	135.33	2	204.88

Olympic Games
Preceded by Eva Samková	Flagbearer for Czech Republic; Beijing 2022 with Alena Mills	Succeeded by David Pastrňák; Lucie Charvátová
