= Angelina Turenko =

Russian figure skater

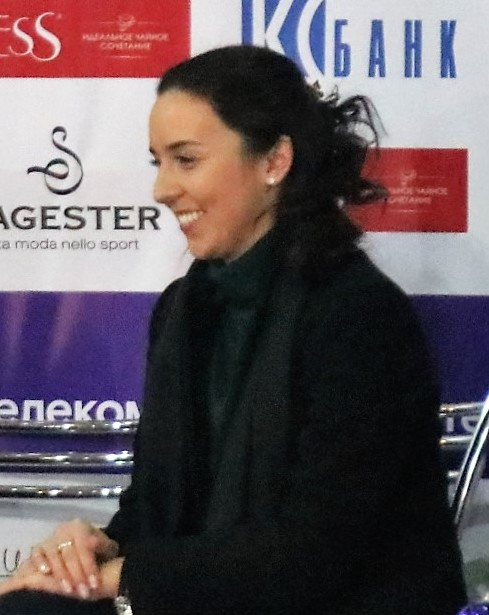
- Turenko at the Russian Figure Skating Championship 2019

Personal information
- Full name: Angelina Nikolayevna Turenko
- Born: 16 December 1988 (age 37) Leningrad, Russian SFSR, Soviet Union
- Height: 1.62 m (5 ft 4 in)

Figure skating career
- Country: Russia
- Began skating: 1994
- Retired: 2007
Medal record
Representing Russia
Figure skating: Singles
European Youth Olympic Festival
Gold medal – first place	2005 Monthey	Singles

Angelina Nikolayevna Turenko (Russian: Ангелина Николаевна Туренко; born 16 December 1988) is a Russian figure skating coach and former competitor. She is the 2003 Coupe Internationale de Nice champion.

== Personal life ==
Turenko was born on December 16, 1988, in Leningrad. In the fall of 2020, she married Italian chef, Giovanni Ricciardella.

== Career ==
Turenko won gold at the 2003 Coupe Internationale de Nice, having placed first in both segments ahead of Vanessa Gusmeroli of France. She finished 8th at the 2004 World Junior Championships in The Hague, Netherlands.

She retired from competitive skating following the 2005-06 figure skating season.

== Coaching career ==
After retiring from competition, Turenko began coaching in Saint Petersburg before relocating to the Young Goose Academy in Egna, Italy in 2021.

In the summer of 2023, Turenko relocated to Assago to coach at the IceLab Skating Club.

Her current students include:

- (Lithuania) Daria Afinogenova
- (Croatia) Jari Kessler
- (Hungary) Júlia Láng
- (Italy) Matteo Nalbone
- (Poland) Oscar Oliver
- (Italy) Anna Pezzetta
- (Poland) Vladimir Samoilov
- (Lithuania) Milana Siniavskyte

Her former students include:

- (Russia) Anastasiia Gubanova
- (Finland) Alisa Mikonsaari
- (Italy) Nikol Gosviani
- (Russia) Elizaveta Nugumanova
- (Russia) Serafima Sakhanovich
- (Italy) Daniel Grassl
- (Hungary) Vivien Papp
- (Poland) Ekaterina Kurakova
- (Georgia (country)) Morisi Kvitelashvili
- (Austria) Tobia Oellerer
- (Switzerland) Naoki Rossi
- (Italy) Gabriele Frangipani
- (Spain) Tomàs-Llorenç Guarino Sabaté
- (Czech Republic) Barbora Vrankova

== Programs ==
Season	Short program	Free skating
2005–06		Rhapsody in Blue by George Gershwin
2004–05	Granada	Warsaw Concerto by Richard Addinsell
2003–04	Waltz by Isaac Schwartz	Malèna by Ennio Morricone

== Competitive highlights ==
International
Event	00–01	01–02	02–03	03–04	04–05	05–06
Cup of Nice				1st	4th	
International: Junior
Junior Worlds				8th		
JGP Bulgaria						11th
JGP Croatia				4th		
JGP Hungary					9th	
JGP Ukraine					8th	
EYOF					1st	
National
Russian Champ.				8th	5th	12th
Russian Junior	10th	11th	5th	1st	5th	
