= Figure skating at the 2003 European Youth Olympic Festival =

Figure skating at the 2003 European Youth Olympic Winter Festival were held in Bled, Slovenia between 25 and 31 January 2003. Skaters competed in the disciplines of men's singles, ladies' singles, pair skating, and Ice dancing.

== Results ==
=== Men ===
Rank	Name	Nation	TFP	SP	FS
1	Sergei Dobrin	Russia	1.5	1	1
2	Yannick Ponsero	France	3.0	2	2
3	Radomir Soumar	Germany	5.5	5	3
4	Paolo Bacchini	Italy	7.5	3	6
5	Matthew Wilkinson	United Kingdom	8.5	7	5
6	Juan Legaz	Spain	10.0	6	7
7	Ondřej Hotárek	Czech Republic	10.5	13	4
8	Raphaël Bohren	Switzerland	11.0	4	9
9	Niklas Hogner	Sweden	15.0	14	8
10	Przemysław Domański	Poland	15.0	8	11
11	Viktor Pfeifer	Austria	16.0	12	10
12	Ivan Kinčík	Slovakia	17.0	10	12
13	Visa Tuominen	Finland	18.5	11	13
14	Damjan Ostojič	Slovenia	19.5	9	15
15	Dzmitry Malochnikau	Belarus	22.5	17	14
16	Alexei Chumak	Ukraine	24.5	15	17
17	Tomas Katukevicius	Lithuania	25.0	18	16
18	Marc Casal Rossell	Andorra	28.0	20	18
19	Gegham Vardanyan	Azerbaijan	29.5	21	19
20	Evgeni Krasnopolski	Israel	29.5	19	20
21	Ali Tayfun Erguven	Turkey	30.0	16	22
22	Josip Gluhak	Croatia	32.0	22	21

=== Ladies ===
Rant	Name	Nation	TFP	SP	FS
1	Katharina Häcker	Germany	1.5	1	1
2	Lina Johansson	Sweden	3.0	2	2
3	Viktória Pavuk	Hungary	4.5	3	3
4	Olga Naidenova	Russia	6.0	4	4
5	Gintarė Vostrecovaitė	Lithuania	8.5	5	6
6	Viviane Käser	Switzerland	9.5	9	5
7	Candice Didier	France	10.0	6	7
8	Giorgia Carrossa	Italy	15.5	15	8
9	Martine Zuiderwijk	Netherlands	16.0	10	11
10	Olga Orlova	Ukraine	16.5	13	10
11	Rebecca Collett	United Kingdom	17.5	7	14
12	Jana Sýkorová	Czech Republic	18.0	18	9
13	Evgenia Melnik	Belarus	18.0	12	12
14	Mona Grannenfelt	Finland	18.5	11	13
15	Simona Ocelkova	Slovakia	19.0	8	15
16	Laura Fernandez	Spain	23.0	14	16
17	Teodora Postič	Slovenia	25.0	16	17
18	Željka Krizmanić	Croatia	28.5	19	19
19	Marija Balaba	Latvia	28.5	17	20
20	Melissandre Fuentas	Andorra	29.5	23	18
21	Duygu Salur	Turkey	31.5	21	21
22	Kristiina Daub	Estonia	33.0	20	23
23	Maria Balea Andreea	Romania	34.0	24	22
24	Kristel Popović	Yugoslavia	35.0	22	24
25	Maria Mastrogiannopoulou	Greece	37.5	25	25

=== Pairs ===
Rank	Name	Nation	TFP	SP	FS
1	Arina Ushakova / Alexander Popov	Russia	1.5	1	1
2	Rebecca Handke / Daniel Wende	Germany	3.5	3	2
3	Julia Beloglazova / Andriy Bekh	Ukraine	5.0	4	3
4	Veronika Havlíčková / Karel Štefl	Czech Republic	6.0	2	5
5	Marylin Pla / Yannick Bonheur	France	6.5	5	4
6	Rumyana Spasova / Stanimir Todorov	Bulgaria	9.0	6	6
7	Ludmila Vesjolaja / Aleksei Vesjolijs	Latvia	10.5	7	7

=== Ice dance ===
Rank	Name	Nation	TFP	CD	OD	FD
1	Natalia Mikhailova / Arkadi Sergueev	Russia	2.4	2	1	1
2	Christina Beier / William Beier	Germany	3.6	1	2	2
3	Alexandra Zaretsky / Roman Zaretsky	Israel	6.0	3	3	3
4	Petra Pachlova / Petr Knoth	Czech Republic	8.6	4	5	4
5	Anna Zadorozhniuk / Sergei Verbillo	Ukraine	9.4	5	4	5
6	Élodie Brouiller / Lionel Rumi	France	12.4	7	6	6
7	Anna Cappellini / Matteo Zanni	Italy	14.6	6	7	8
8	Candice Towler-Green / James Phillipson	United Kingdom	15.4	9	8	7
9	Zsuzsanna Nagy / György Elek	Hungary	17.6	8	9	9
10	Joanna Budner / Jan Mościcki	Poland	20.0	10	10	10
11	Daniela Keller / Fabian Keller	Switzerland	22.0	11	11	11
12	Grethe Grünberg / Kristjan Rand	Estonia	24.0	12	12	12
13	Valeria Boulyguina / Oleg Krupen	Belarus	26.0	13	13	13
