= Gorshkov =

Gorshkov (masculine, Russian: Горшков) or Gorshkova (feminine, Russian: Горшкова) is a Russian surname. Notable people with the surname include:

- Aleksandr Gorshkov (disambiguation), multiple people
- Alexei Gorshkov (born 1967), Russian ice dancing coach, father of Anastasia
- Anastasia Gorshkova (born 1987), Russian ice dancer, daughter of Alexei
- Anatoliy Gorshkov (born 1958), Ukrainian racewalker
- Anna Gorshkova (born 1983), Russian actress and model
- Dmitry Gorshkov (born 1967), Russian water polo player
- Gordei Gorshkov (born 1993), Russian figure skater
- Kristina Gorshkova (born 1989), Russian ice dancer
- Mikhail Gorshkov (1950–2025), Russian sociologist
- Nadezhda Gorshkova (born 1956), Russian pair skater
- Sergey Gorshkov (1910–1988), Soviet naval officer
- Sergey Gorshkov (general) (1902–1993), Soviet general and cavalryman
- Vasiliy Gorshkov (born 1977), Russian pole vaulter

== See also ==
- Soviet aircraft carrier Admiral Gorshkov
- Admiral Gorshkov-class frigate
  - Russian frigate Admiral Gorshkov, the lead ship of this class
- Gorshkovo
- Horshkov, Ukrainian-language variant
