= Julia Lautowa =

Austrian figure skater

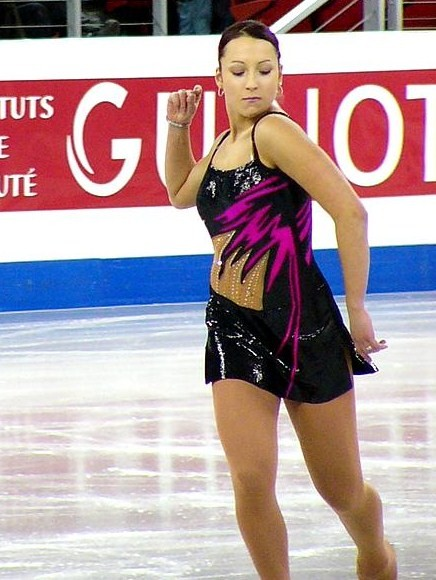
- Lautowa at the 2004 European Championships

Personal information
- Native name: Юлия Лаутова
- Other names: Yulia Lautova
- Born: 5 October 1981 (age 45) Moscow, Russian SFSR, Soviet Union
- Height: 1.66 m (5 ft 5 1/2 in)

Figure skating career
- Country: Austria
- Skating club: Cottage Engelmann Verein Wien
- Began skating: 1985
- Retired: 2004

Julia Lautowa (Russian: Юлия Лаутова; born 5 October 1981) is an Austrian former competitive figure skater in ladies' singles. She is the 1996 Cup of Russia silver medalist, a two-time Karl Schäfer Memorial champion, and a six-time Austrian national champion. She placed in the top ten at five ISU Championships.

== Personal life ==
Lautowa was born on 5 October 1981 in Moscow, Russian SFSR, Soviet Union, and moved to Vienna, Austria at the age of twelve. She became an Austrian citizen in 1996. She married Russian ice dancer Roman Kostomarov in June 2004 but the relationship has ended.

Her daughter, Skylar Lautowa-Peguero, won the silver medal at the junior level at the 2025 U.S. Figure Skating Championships.

== Career ==
Lautowa began skating in 1985 in Moscow. Early in her career, she was coached by Marina Kudriavtseva, Elena Tchaikovskaia, and S. Gromov.

Competing for Austria, she made her first ISU Championship appearance at the 1994 Junior Worlds in Colorado Springs, Colorado; she qualified for the free skate and finished 15th overall.

In the 1994–95 season, Lautowa placed 24th at the 1995 World Junior Championships in Budapest and 21st at the 1995 European Championships in Dortmund. She missed the cut-off for the free skate at the 1995 World Championships in Birmingham.

In the 1996–97 season, Lautowa won her first senior international title at the Karl Schäfer Memorial. Appearing in the inaugural Champions Series (later known as the Grand Prix series), she placed fourth at the 1996 Skate America and was awarded the silver medal at the 1996 Cup of Russia. She also appeared twice on the junior level, placing sixth (12th in the short program, third in the free skate) at the 1997 Junior Worlds in Seoul, South Korea, and taking silver at the 1997 European Youth Olympic Festival in Sundsvall, Sweden. She finished 16th at the 1997 European Championships in Paris and 8th at the 1997 World Championships in Lausanne, having placed 5th in her qualifying group, 11th in the short, and 6th in the free.

In February 1998, Lautowa represented Austria at the Winter Olympics in Nagano, Japan. Ranked 21st in the short, she qualified for the free skate, where she placed 13th, lifting her to 14th overall.

Lautowa was off the ice for one year after sustaining a back injury in August 2000. She trained under Jana Hübler in Vienna during the 2001–02 season. She placed 12th at the 2002 Europeans and 22nd at the 2002 Worlds.

Hübler, Peter Jonas, and Marina Kudriavtseva coached Lautowa in the 2002–03 season. She ranked 26th at the 2003 Europeans in Malmö and 15th at the 2003 Worlds in Washington, D.C.

In her final competitive season, Lautowa trained under Kudriavtseva in Moscow. She finished eighth at the 2004 Europeans in Budapest and 25th at the 2004 Worlds in Dortmund.

Lautowa coaches figure skating at the Ice House of New Jersey, where her students include Lindsay Thorngren.

== Programs ==
Season	Short program	Free skating
2003–2004	Fever by John Davenport	The Phantom of the Opera on Ice by Robert Danova
2002–2003	Harlem Nocturne by Earle Hagen	Malagueña by Ernesto Lecuona; Macarena by Calero Monterde; The World of Flamenco by Ernesto Lecuona
2001–2002	Harlem Nocturne by Earle Hagen	Marroccoba by James Last and Orchestra

== Results ==
GP: Champions Series / Grand Prix

International
Event	93–94	94–95	95–96	96–97	97–98	98–99	99–00	00–01	01–02	02–03	03–04
Olympics					14th						
Worlds		31st		8th		15th			22nd	15th	25th
Europeans		21st		16th	8th	11th	12th		12th	26th	8th
GP Cup of Russia				2nd							
GP Lalique							WD				9th
GP NHK Trophy										11th	
GP Bofrost										10th	
GP Skate America				4th	6th		9th				11th
GP Skate Canada					8th						
Finlandia Trophy					2nd						
Golden Spin										3rd	
Nepela Memorial									2nd		3rd
Schäfer Memorial			2nd	1st						13th	1st
International: Junior
Junior Worlds	15th	24th	12th	6th	10th		20th				
EYOF				2nd							
Blue Swords	5th J										
National
Austrian Champ.	1st			1st			1st		1st	1st	1st
J = Junior level; WD = Withdrew
