= Figure skating at the 2009 European Youth Olympic Festival =

- Date: February 14 – 21
- Season: 2008–09
- Location: Cieszyn, Poland

Champions
- Men's singles: (Estonia) Viktor Romanenkov
- Ladies' singles: (Austria) Miriam Ziegler
- Ice dance: (Russia) Tatiana Baturintseva / Ivan Volobuev
- Previous: 2007 European Youth Olympic Festival
- Next: 2011 European Youth Olympic Festival

Figure skating at the 2009 European Youth Olympic Festival took place at the MOSiR Cieszyn, Poland between February 14 and 21, 2009. Skaters competed in the disciplines of men's singles, ladies' singles, and ice dancing.

The compulsory dance was the Paso Doble.

== Results ==
=== Men ===
Rank	Name	Nation	Total points	SP		FS	
1	Viktor Romanenkov	Estonia	148.67	3	50.09	1	98.58
2	Stanislav Pertsov	Ukraine	146.45	1	54.20	3	92.25
3	Gordey Gorshkov	Russia	138.28	5	44.10	2	94.18
4	Paul Fentz	Germany	137.92	2	50.23	5	87.69
5	Peter Reitmayer	Slovakia	133.09	4	46.54	6	86.55
6	Saverio Giacomelli	Italy	130.91	7	42.65	4	88.26
7	Gaylord Lavoisier	France	129.87	6	43.49	7	86.38
8	Alejandro Soler	Spain	118.50	9	39.74	8	78.76
9	Julian Lagus	Finland	113.16	8	41.76	10	71.40
10	Engin Ali Artan	Turkey	105.96	15	33.72	9	72.24
11	Harry Mattick	United Kingdom	105.72	13	36.76	11	68.96
12	Sebastian Lofek	Poland	105.40	12	37.20	12	68.20
13	Aliaksei Mialiokhin	Belarus	103.12	10	38.76	14	64.36
14	Noah Scherer	Switzerland	99.87	14	35.24	13	64.63
15	Viktor Silov	Lithuania	93.94	16	31.44	15	62.50
16	Sargis Hayrapetian	Armenia	89.25	11	38.47	16	50.78
17	Vlad Radu Ionescu	Romania	76.07	17	28.77	17	47.30
18	Daniel Nikolov	Bulgaria	55.57	18	20.73	18	34.84
19	Borna Blagojević	Croatia	46.70	19	17.07	19	29.63

=== Ladies ===
Rank	Name	Nation	Total points	SP		FS	
1	Miriam Ziegler	Austria	141.02	1	53.90	1	87.12
2	Joshi Helgesson	Sweden	125.44	2	49.90	3	75.54
3	Anne Line Gjersem	Norway	119.51	5	42.06	2	77.45
4	Sandy Hoffmann	Germany	116.61	4	43.40	4	73.21
5	Alexandra Kunova	Slovakia	111.22	6	40.60	5	70.62
6	Alisa Mikonsaari	Finland	108.90	9	39.28	6	69.62
7	Johanna Allik	Estonia	108.71	7	40.20	7	68.51
8	Anastasiya Lystopad	Ukraine	102.06	3	44.44	15	57.62
9	Sofia Curci	Italy	101.57	13	36.30	8	65.27
10	Sandra Sitbon	France	100.78	8	40.08	11	60.70
11	Marta Maria Garcia	Spain	100.40	10	38.10	9	62.30
12	Kate Powell	United Kingdom	96.07	14	36.08	12	59.99
13	Kristina Kostkova	Czech Republic	95.86	12	37.40	14	58.46
14	Nika Ceric	Slovenia	94.87	15	35.64	13	59.23
15	Sofia Bardakov	Israel	91.98	11	37.86	17	54.12
16	Deborah Pisa	Switzerland	90.13	21	28.60	10	61.53
17	Dinara Vasfieva	Russia	89.31	17	34.14	16	55.17
18	Eva Lim	Netherlands	86.38	16	34.90	20	51.48
19	Marta Olczak	Poland	86.37	18	33.30	18	53.07
20	Anna Rage	Latvia	83.54	19	32.98	22	50.56
21	Birce Atabey	Turkey	80.57	20	29.86	21	50.71
22	Ariana Tarrado Ribes	Andorra	77.79	26	25.52	19	52.27
23	Viktoryia Liakhava	Belarus	74.38	27	25.48	23	48.90
24	Georgia Glastris	Greece	69.69	25	26.26	24	43.43
25	Anita Nagy	Romania	69.31	23	27.24	25	42.07
26	Daniela Stoeva	Bulgaria	68.33	24	26.48	26	41.85
27	Monia Aleksić	Croatia	66.63	22	28.30	28	38.33
28	Viktorija Shalunova	Lithuania	63.55	28	25.46	29	38.09
29	Jasmina Uzunović	Serbia	62.47	29	22.10	27	40.37

=== Ice dancing ===
Rank	Name	Nation	Total points	CD		OD		FD	
1	Tatiana Baturintseva / Ivan Volobuev	Russia	140.83	1	28.02	1	44.39	1	68.42
2	Ruslana Yurchenko / Aleksandr Liubchenko	Ukraine	128.04	2	26.15	2	39.93	2	61.96
3	Gabriela Kubova / Petr Seknicka	Czech Republic	117.43	3	25.70	3	38.16	4	53.57
4	Federica Testa / Andrea Malnati	Italy	110.83	4	22.39	4	35.32	5	53.12
5	Dominique Dieck / Michael Zenkner	Germany	107.97	5	21.41	6	32.96	3	53.60
6	Roxane Battu / Amaury Mallet	France	104.89	6	19.65	7	32.53	6	52.71
7	Sara Hurtado / Adria Diaz	Spain	101.14	7	19.31	5	33.77	7	48.06
8	Sophie Jones / Richard Sharpe	United Kingdom	95.99	8	19.12	8	31.58	8	45.29
9	Victoria Bausback / Seelik Mutti	Switzerland	82.74	9	15.36	9	28.29	9	39.09
10	Emili Arm / Rodion Bogdanov	Estonia	70.62	10	14.07	10	25.24	10	31.31
