= Horshkov =

Horshkov is a Ukrainian surname, an equivalent of the Russian Gorshkov. Notable people with the surname include:

- Hennadiy Horshkov (born 1953), retired Soviet football player and Ukrainian coach
- Oleksandr Horshkov (born 1970), Ukrainian association football coach and former midfielder
