= Artem Grigoriev =

Russian former competitive figure skater

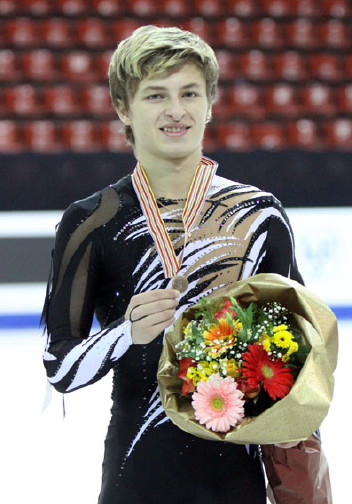
- Grigoriev in 2009.

Personal information
- Native name: Артём Серге́евич Григорьев
- Full name: Artem Sergeyevich Grigoriev
- Born: 27 February 1992 (age 34) Moscow, Russian SFSR, Soviet Union
- Height: 1.70 m (5 ft 7 in)

Figure skating career
- Country: Russia
- Skating club: CSKA Moscow
- Began skating: 1998
- Retired: 2012
Medal record
Representing Russia
Figure skating: Singles
World Junior Championships
Bronze medal – third place	2009 Sofia	Singles
European Youth Olympic Festival
Gold medal – first place	2007 Jaca	Singles

Artem Sergeyevich Grigoriev (Russian: Артём Серге́евич Григорьев, born 27 February 1992) is a Russian former competitive figure skater. He is the 2009 World Junior bronze medalist and won three medals on the ISU Junior Grand Prix series.

== Programs ==
Season	Short program	Free skating
2010–2011	Paganini	The Nutcracker by Pyotr I. Tchaikovsky
2008–2009	Touch and Go - Tango in Harlem	Swan Lake (modern arrangement)

== Competitive highlights ==
JGP: Junior Grand Prix

International
Event	05–06	06–07	07–08	08–09	09–10	10–11	11–12
NRW Trophy							6th
Nepela Memorial							12th
International: Junior
Junior Worlds				3rd			
JGP Austria						2nd	
JGP Croatia	7th						
JGP Netherlands		7th					
JGP Spain				WD			
JGP Taiwan		7th					
JGP United Kingdom			3rd	5th			
JGP United States			3rd				
EYOF		1st					
NRW Trophy					1st J.		
National
Russian Champ.			8th	9th	7th		10th
Russian Jr. Champ.		4th	5th	3rd	WD		
J. = Junior level; WD = Withdrew
