= Ivan Volobuiev =

Russian ice dancer (born 1991)

Personal information
- Full name: Ivan Nikolayevich Volobuiev
- Born: 5 January 1991 (age 35) Moscow
- Height: 1.78 m (5 ft 10 in)

Figure skating career
- Country: Russia
- Partner: Valeria Starygina
- Coach: Alexander Svinin; Irina Zhuk
- Skating club: UOR No 4, Moscow
- Began skating: 1995
Medal record
Representing Russia
Figure skating: Ice dancing
European Youth Olympic Festival
Gold medal – first place	2009 Cieszyn	Ice dancing

Ivan Nikolayevich Volobuiev (Russian: Иван Николаевич Волобуев; born 5 January 1991) is a Russian ice dancer who competed with partner Valeria Starygina.

== Career ==
Early in his career, Volobuiev competed with Tatiana Baturintseva.

Volobuiev teamed up with Valeria Starygina in 2010. At the Russian Championships, they finished 7th in 2011 and 6th in 2012. Starygina and Volobuiev won gold at the 2011 Coupe de Nice and silver at the 2011 Istanbul Cup.

In the 2012–13 season, they won the silver medal at the 2012 Coupe de Nice.

== Programs ==
(with Starygina)

Season	Short dance	Free dance	Exhibition
2012–2013	?; Witch Doctor	?	
2011–2012	Ain't No Sunshine by Michael Jackson; Loca by Shakira	Walking in the Air by Nightwish	
2010–2011	Tango; Waltz	Stranger in Paradise by Sarah Brightman	

(with Baturintseva)

Season	Short dance	Free dance
2009–2010	Caucasian dance:	The Mask of Zorro by James Horner

== Competitive highlights ==
=== With Starygina ===
International
Event	2010–11	2011–12	2012–13
Cup of Nice	7th	1st	2nd
NRW Trophy	5th		3rd
Istanbul Cup		2nd	
National
Russian Championships	7th	6th	7th

=== With Baturintseva ===
International
Event	2007–08	2008–09	2009–10
JGP Belarus		7th	4th
JGP Croatia			3rd
JGP Estonia	7th		
JGP France		5th	
EYOF		1st	
National
Russian Junior Champ.	11th	9th	10th
JGP = Junior Grand Prix
