= Valeria Starygina =

Russian ice dancer

Personal information
- Full name: Valeria Sergeyevna Starygina
- Born: 13 September 1995 (age 30) Tolyatti, Russia
- Height: 1.58 m (5 ft 2 in)

Figure skating career
- Country: Russia
- Partner: Ivan Volobuiev
- Coach: Alexander Svinin; Irina Zhuk
- Skating club: UOR No 4, Moscow
- Began skating: 2000

Valeria Sergeyevna Starygina (Russian: Валерия Серге́евна Старыгина; born 13 September 1995) is a Russian ice dancer who competed with partner Ivan Volobuiev.

== Career ==
Early in her career, Starygina competed with Nikolai Moroshkin.

Starygina teamed up with Volobuiev in 2010. At the Russian Championships, they finished 7th in 2011 and 6th in 2012. Starygina and Volobuiev won gold at the 2011 Coupe de Nice and silver at the 2011 Istanbul Cup.

In the 2012–13 season, they won the silver medal at the 2012 Coupe de Nice.

== Programs ==
(with Volobuiev)

Season	Short dance	Free dance	Exhibition
2012–2013	?; Witch Doctor	?	
2011–2012	Ain't No Sunshine by Michael Jackson; Loca by Shakira	Walking in the Air by Nightwish	
2010–2011	Tango; Waltz	Stranger in Paradise by Sarah Brightman	

== Competitive highlights ==
=== With Volobuiev ===
International
Event	2010–11	2011–12	2012–13
Cup of Nice	7th	1st	2nd
NRW Trophy	5th		3rd
Istanbul Cup		2nd	
National
Russian Championships	7th	6th	7th

=== With Moroshkin ===
National
Event	2007–08	2008–09	2009–10
Russian Junior Championships	11th	9th	10th
