= Marta Olczak =

Polish figure skater

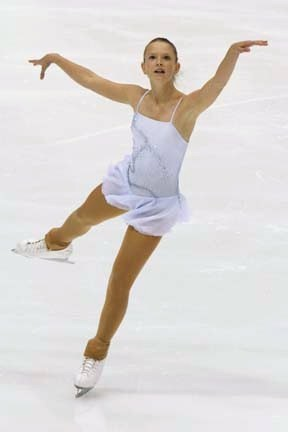

Personal information
- Full name: Marta Olczak
- Born: 19 May 1994 (age 32) Warsaw

Figure skating career
- Country: Poland
- Coach: Sarkis Tewanian
- Skating club: RKS Marymont-Warszawa

Marta Olczak (born 19 May 1994 in Warsaw) is a Polish figure skater. She is the 2007 and 2008 Polish novice national champion. She competed internationally on the junior level.

== Competitive highlights ==
Event	2004–05	2005–06	2006–07	2007–08	2008–09	2012–13
Polish Championships			1st N.	1st N.		3rd
Junior Grand Prix, Spain					30th	
Junior Grand Prix, Belarus					23rd	
Junior Grand Prix, USA				22nd		
European Youth Olympic Festival					19th	
Warsaw Cup		4th N.	9th N.	8th N.		
Gardena Spring Trophy			5th N.			
Coupe de Nice			13th N.			
NRW Trophy				8th J.		
Copenhagen Trophy	18th N.					

- N = Novice level; J = Junior level
