= Natalia Mikhailova =

Russian competitive ice dancer (born 1986)

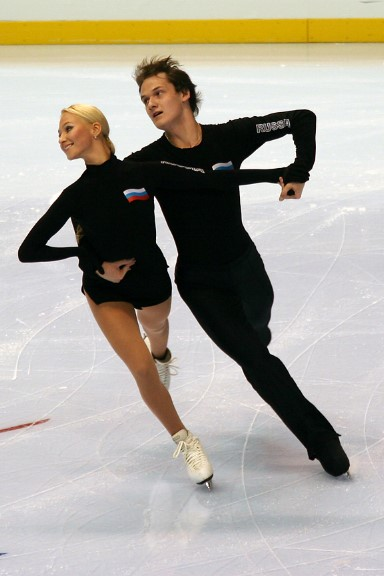
- Mikhailova and Sergeev in 2006

Personal information
- Full name: Natalia Yurievna Mikhailova
- Born: 18 July 1986 (age 40) Moscow, Russian SFSR, Soviet Union
- Height: 1.66 m (5 ft 5 1/2 in)

Figure skating career
- Country: Russia
- Began skating: 1990
- Retired: 2009
Medal record
Representing Russia
Figure skating: Ice dancing
World Junior Championships
Silver medal – second place	2006 Ljubljana	Ice dancing
European Youth Olympic Festival
Gold medal – first place	2003 Bled	Ice dancing

Natalia Yurievna Mikhailova (Russian: Наталья Юрьевна Михайлова; born 18 July 1986) is a Russian former competitive ice dancer. With Arkadi Sergeev, she is the 2006 World Junior silver medalist.

== Career ==
Mikhailova competed with Arkadi Sergeev on the ISU Junior Grand Prix circuit for six seasons beginning in 2000. They won six gold medals and finished 4th three times at the JGP Final. Mikhailova and Sergeev won silver at the 2006 World Junior Championships. They changed coaches in September 2006, moving from Ksenia Rumiantseva and Petr Durnev to Alexander Zhulin. Mikhailova and Sergeev parted ways at the end of the 2006–07 season – Sergeev had sustained a number of injuries, including rupture of the outer ligaments of the ankle and a fracture, followed by a meniscus problem after he returned to the ice.

Mikhailova and Andrei Maximishin teamed up in mid-2007 and were coached by Zhulin in Moscow. They competed together in the 2007–2008 season, winning the silver medal at the 2007 Golden Spin of Zagreb, but parted ways at the end of the season.

Mikhailova and Sergeev teamed up again in 2008 but they retired from competition after finishing 6th at the 2009 Russian Championships.

== Personal life ==
Mikhailova married Alexander Zhulin in August 2018. Their daughter, Ekaterina, was born on 10 January 2013 in Moscow.

== Programs ==
(with Sergeev)

Season	Original dance	Free dance
2008–2009	Quizás, Quizás, Quizás; Let's Face the Music and Dance	
2006–2007	Tango: Adiós Nonino by Astor Piazzolla	Jesus Christ Superstar by Andrew Lloyd Webber
2005–2006	Cha Cha; Rhumba; Samba	Adagio by Lara Fabian
2004–2005	Quickstep; Slow foxtrot; Quickstep	Four Seasons by Antonio Vivaldi (modern version); Musical Da Vinci; Four Seasons by Antonio Vivaldi (modern version)
2003–2004	Rock'n roll: Long Tall Sally; Blues; Rock'n roll: Long Tall Sally	The Cha-Cha-Cha Dance a Knight Away; Whatever Happens by Michael Jackson; Love by Army of Lovers
2002–2003	March; Waltz by Georgy Sviridov; Galop	Roméo et Juliette by Gérard Presgurvic

== Competitive highlights ==
GP: Grand Prix; JGP: Junior Grand Prix

=== With Sergeev ===
International
Event	00–01	01–02	02–03	03–04	04–05	05–06	06–07	08–09
GP Skate Canada							8th	
GP Skate America							10th	
Nepela Memorial								3rd
International: Junior
Junior Worlds			6th	4th	5th	2nd		
JGP Final			7th	4th	4th	4th		
JGP Canada			1st					
JGP China					2nd			
JGP Croatia						1st		
JGP Czech Rep.	11th							
JGP France	7th							
JGP Germany					1st			
JGP Japan		4th		1st				
JGP Mexico				1st				
JGP Poland		7th						
JGP Slovakia						1st		
JGP United States			4th					
EYOF			1st					
National
Russian								6th
Russian Junior	7th	5th	3rd	1st	1st	1st		

=== With Maximishin ===
International
Event	2007–2008
Golden Spin of Zagreb	2nd
National
Russian Championships	4th
