= Julia Soldatova =

Russian figure skater

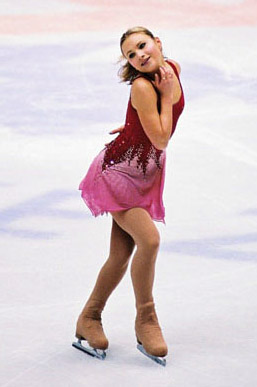
- Soldatova at the 2002 Winter Olympics

Personal information
- Full name: Julia Nikolayevna Soldatova
- Born: 17 May 1981 (age 45) Moscow, Russian SFSR, Soviet Union
- Height: 1.60 m (5 ft 3 in)

Figure skating career
- Country: Belarus; Russia
- Skating club: Sport Club Moskvitch
- Began skating: 1985
- Retired: 2006
Medal record
Representing Russia
Figure skating: Ladies' singles
World Championships
Bronze medal – third place	1999 Helsinki	Ladies' singles
European Championships
Silver medal – second place	1999 Prague	Ladies' singles
Russian Championships
Silver medal – second place	1998 Moscow	Ladies' singles
Silver medal – second place	1999 Moscow	Ladies' singles
Silver medal – second place	2004 Saint Petersburg	Ladies' singles
Belarusian Championships
Gold medal – first place	2001 Minsk	Ladies' singles
Gold medal – first place	2002 Minsk	Ladies' singles
World Junior Championships
Gold medal – first place	1998 Saint John	Ladies' singles
Junior Grand Prix Final
Gold medal – first place	1997–98 Lausanne	Ladies' singles
European Youth Olympic Festival
Gold medal – first place	1997 Sundsvall	Ladies' singles

Julia Nikolayevna Soldatova (Russian: Юлия Николаевна Солдатова; born 17 May 1981) is a Russian former competitive figure skater who competed for both Russia and Belarus. She represented Belarus at the 2002 Winter Olympics. She is the World Junior champion, the World bronze medalist, the European silver medalist, and the 1997 JGP Final champion.

== Personal life ==
Soldatova was born on 17 May 1981 in Moscow. She studied at the Institute for Physical Culture.

== Career ==
Soldatova began skating at the age of four. She won the 1998 World Junior title. In 2000, she finished fourth at the Russian nationals, and therefore was not selected to compete at the 2000 World Championships.

In spring 2000, Soldatova decided to compete for Belarus internationally. She withdrew from the 2001 European Championships after the short program due to a shoulder injury. In 2004, she returned briefly to compete for Russia.

Soldatova has progressed into a coaching career. One of her best student is Daniela Asanova, a competitor at the Russian novice junior nationals 2010.

== Programs ==
Season	Short program	Free skating
2004–05	Sheherazade by Nikolai Rimsky-Korsakov	Don Quixote by Ludwig Minkus
2001–02	La Ballade de Caramandiana by Richard Clayderman	Luna de Paris; Une Folle Envie d'Aimer; Lupita by Raúl Di Blasio
2000–01	Nyah (from Mission: Impossible 2) by Hans Zimmer	To Be; Aria de Syrna; Le cri des Forets by Saint-Preux
1999–00	La Leyenda del Beso by Raúl Di Blasio	El Dia Que Me Quieras by Raúl Di Blasio
1998–99	La Leyenda del Beso by Raúl Di Blasio	Lluvia De Estrellas by Raúl Di Blasio

== Competitive highlights ==
International
Event	1995–96 (RUS)	1996–97 (RUS)	1997–98 (RUS)	1998–99 (RUS)	1999–00 (RUS)	2000–01 (BLR)	2001–02 (BLR)	2003–04 (RUS)
Olympics							18th	
Worlds				3rd		20th	18th	
Europeans			7th	2nd		WD		
Grand Prix Final					4th			
GP Cup of Russia				2nd	2nd			
GP Lalique						6th		
GP Skate America					2nd			
GP Skate Canada					2nd			
Golden Spin				1st		1st		
Karl Schäfer		5th				1st		
Nebelhorn							10th	
International: Junior
Junior Worlds			1st					
JS Final			1st					
JS Germany			2nd					
JS Hungary			1st					
EYOF		1st						
National
Belarusian						1st	1st	
Russian	7th	4th	2nd	2nd	4th			2nd
