= Maxim Bolotin =

Russian former competitive ice dancer

Personal information
- Born: 6 August 1982 (age 44) Yekaterinburg, Russian SFSR, Soviet Union
- Height: 1.87 m (6 ft 1 1/2 in)

Figure skating career
- Country: Russia
- Skating club: SHVSM Moscow
- Began skating: 1987
- Retired: 2004
Medal record
Representing Russia
Figure skating: Ice dancing
European Youth Olympic Festival
| Gold medal – first place | 1999 Poprad-Tatry | Ice dancing |

Maxim Bolotin (born 6 August 1982) is a Russian former competitive ice dancer. With Oksana Domnina, he won the bronze medal at the 2002 Russian Junior Figure Skating Championships, placed 7th at the 2002 World Junior Figure Skating Championships, and placed 4th at the 2001–2002 ISU Junior Grand Prix Final. After that partnership ended, he teamed up with Olga Orlova and won additional medals on the ISU Junior Grand Prix circuit.

Bolotin is now working as a coach.

== Programs ==
=== With Orlova ===
| Season | Original dance | Free dance |
|---|---|---|
| 2003–2004 | Blues; Rock'n'roll | Carmen by Georges Bizet |

=== With Domnina ===
| Season | Original dance | Free dance |
|---|---|---|
| 2001–2002 | Tango; Flamenco | Natasha Atlas; Kitaro; Natasha Atlas |

== Results ==
JGP: Junior Grand Prix

=== With Orlova ===
International
| Event | 2002–2003 | 2003–2004 |
|---|---|---|
| JGP Final | | 8th |
| JGP Canada | 5th | |
| JGP Croatia | | 2nd |
| JGP Czech Republic | | 2nd |
| JGP United States | 2nd | |

=== With Domnina ===
International
| Event | 2000–2001 | 2001–2002 |
|---|---|---|
| World Junior Championships | | 7th |
| JGP Final | 7th | 4th |
| JGP Bulgaria | | 1st |
| JGP Czech Republic | | 2nd |
| JGP Poland | 2nd | |
| JGP Ukraine | 3rd | |
National
| Russian Junior Championships | 3rd | 3rd |

=== With Litvinenko ===
International
| Event | 1998–1999 |
|---|---|
| European Youth Olympic Festival | 1st J |
J = Junior level
