= Figure skating at the 1995 European Youth Olympic Festival =

Figure skating at the 1995 European Youth Olympic Winter Days were held in Andorra, Andorra between February 5 and 9, 1995. Skaters competed in the disciplines of men's singles, ladies' singles, and ice dancing.

== Results ==
=== Men ===
| Rank | Name | Nation | TFP | SP | FS |
|---|---|---|---|---|---|
| 1 | Szabolcs Vidrai | Hungary | 2.5 | 3 | 1 |
| 2 | Vitaly Danilchenko | Ukraine | 3.5 | 1 | 3 |
| 3 | David Jäschke | Germany | 5.0 | 6 | 2 |
| 4 | Florian Tuma | Austria | 5.0 | 2 | 4 |
| 5 | Christo Turlakov | Bulgaria | 7.0 | 4 | 5 |
| 6 | Peter Jaros | Czech Republic | 9.5 | 5 | 7 |
| 7 | Adam Zalegowski | Poland | 11.5 | 7 | 8 |
| 8 | Neil Wilson | United Kingdom | 12.5 | 13 | 6 |
| 9 | Gheorghe Chiper | Romania | 13.0 | 8 | 9 |
| 10 | Róbert Kažimír | Slovakia | 15.5 | 11 | 10 |
| 11 | Miguel Alegre | Spain | 17.0 | 12 | 11 |
| 12 | Vakhtang Mourvanidze | Georgia | 17.0 | 10 | 12 |
| 13 | Frédéric Dambier | France | 17.5 | 9 | 13 |
| 14 | Roberto Sana | Italy | 22.0 | 16 | 14 |
| 15 | Evgeni Kapitoulets | Belarus | 22.0 | 14 | 15 |
| 16 | Edgar Gregorian | Armenia | 23.5 | 15 | 16 |
| 17 | Panagiotis Markouizos | Greece | 25.5 | 17 | 17 |

=== Ladies ===
| Rank | Name | Nation | TFP | SP | FS |
|---|---|---|---|---|---|
| 1 | Nadezda Kanaeva | Russia | 2.0 | 2 | 1 |
| 2 | Vanessa Gusmeroli | France | 3.5 | 3 | 2 |
| 3 | Krisztina Czakó | Hungary | 3.5 | 1 | 3 |
| 4 | Inna Zayets | Ukraine | 6.5 | 5 | 4 |
| 5 | Jekaterina Golovatenko | Estonia | 8.0 | 4 | 6 |
| 6 | Carmen Poppek | Germany | 9.5 | 9 | 5 |
| 7 | Zoe Jones | United Kingdom | 10.5 | 7 | 7 |
| 8 | Klara Bramfeldt | Sweden | 11.0 | 6 | 8 |
| 9 | Christel Borghi | Switzerland | 14.0 | 10 | 9 |
| 10 | Madalina Matei | Romania | 15.0 | 8 | 11 |
| 11 | Sabina Wojtala | Poland | 15.5 | 11 | 10 |
| 12 | Ingrida Zenkeviciute | Lithuania | 20.5 | 17 | 12 |
| 13 | Haya Leenards | Netherlands | 21.5 | 15 | 14 |
| 14 | Ana Ivančić | Croatia | 21.5 | 13 | 15 |
| 15 | Valeria Vacchini | Italy | 22.5 | 19 | 13 |
| 16 | Melita Celesnik | Slovenia | 24.0 | 16 | 16 |
| 17 | Petra Hrdlicka | Austria | 24.0 | 14 | 17 |
| 18 | Ellen Mareels | Belgium | 27.0 | 18 | 18 |
| 19 | Selja Teitti | Finland | 27.0 | 12 | 21 |
| 20 | Anna Maria Portillo | Spain | 29.5 | 21 | 19 |
| 21 | Ksenija Jastsenjski | FR Yugoslavia | 30.0 | 20 | 20 |
| 22 | Natalia Sapelkina | Belarus | 33.0 | 22 | 22 |
| 23 | Elena Sirokhvatova | Latvia | 35.0 | 24 | 23 |
| 24 | Anna Chatziathanasiou | Greece | 36.5 | 25 | 24 |
| 25 | Khatuna Kharitonashvili | Georgia | 36.5 | 23 | 25 |
