= Nadezda Kanaeva =

Russian figure skater (born 1982)

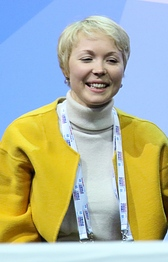

Personal information
- Native name: Надежда Канаева
- Other names: Nadezhda Kanaeva; Nadia Kanaeva
- Born: 9 February 1982 (age 44) Moscow, Russian SFSR, Soviet Union

Figure skating career
- Country: Russia
- Retired: 1998
Medal record
Representing Russia
Figure skating: Singles
World Junior Championships
| Bronze medal – third place | 1996 Brisbane | Singles |
European Youth Olympic Festival
| Gold medal – first place | 1995 Andorra | Singles |

Nadezda "Nadia" Kanaeva (Russian: Надежда Канаева; born 9 February 1982) is a Russian former competitive figure skater. She is the 1997 Nebelhorn Trophy bronze medalist, 1996 World Junior bronze medalist, and 1995 European Youth Olympic champion. She was coached by Elena Buianova.

As of 2020, Kanaeva worked as a skating coach at Lakewood ICE in Lakewood, California, assisting Rafael Arutyunyan.

== Competitive highlights ==
JGP: Junior Grand Prix (also titled ISU Junior Series)

International
| Event | 1994–95 | 1995–96 | 1996–97 | 1997–98 |
|---|---|---|---|---|
| Nebelhorn Trophy | | 6th | | 3rd |
International: Junior
| World Junior Champ. | | 3rd | | |
| JGP Hungary | | | | 8th |
| JGP Slovakia | | | | 5th |
| Blue Swords | | | 4th | |
| EYOF | 1st | | | |
National
| Russian Champ. | | 4th | | 11th |
