= Katharina Häcker =

German figure skater

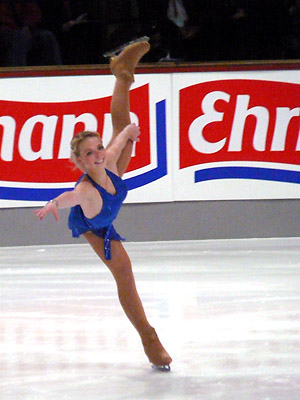
- Häcker in 2007.

Personal information
- Born: 25 December 1986 (age 39) Mannheim, West Germany
- Height: 1.60 m (5 ft 3 in)

Figure skating career
- Country: Germany
- Skating club: Mannheimer ERC
- Began skating: 1993
- Retired: 2011

Katharina Häcker (born 25 December 1986 in Mannheim) is a German former competitive figure skater. She won the 2003 European Youth Olympic Festival, 2011 Bavarian Open, and 2002 German national title. She competed at two World Junior Championships, finishing sixth in 2001.

Häcker missed the 2005–06 and 2006–07 seasons due to injury.

== Programs ==
Season	Short program	Free skating
2003–2004		Gloomy Sunday – A Song of Love and Death
2001–2003	Quixote by Bond	Titans Spirit by Trevor Rabin
2000–2001	Grease (musical) by Brian W. Tidwell performed by Larry Wilcox	Bad Girls by Jerry Goldsmith performed by Alexander Courage

== Competitive highlights ==
JGP: Junior Grand Prix

International
Event	00–01	01–02	02–03	03–04	04–05	07–08	08–09	09–10	10–11
Bavarian Open									1st
Cup of Nice								5th	
Finlandia Trophy							10th		
Golden Spin							4th		
Nebelhorn Trophy				9th		19th	11th	10th	
Triglav Trophy								4th	
Fischer Pokal			10th	1st	5th	1st		1st	
International: Junior
Junior Worlds	6th		26th						
JGP Czech Republic				7th					
JGP Germany	11th		11th						
JGP Italy			10th						
JGP Poland				10th					
JGP United States					10th				
EYOF			1st J						
Fischer Pokal		3rd J							
National
German Champ.	6th	1st	2nd	4th	7th	6th	6th	5th	2nd
