= Figure skating at the 2005 European Youth Olympic Festival =

Figure skating at the 2005 European Youth Olympic Winter Festival took place in Monthey, Switzerland between January 22 and 29, 2005. Skaters competed in the disciplines of men's singles and ladies' singles.

== Results ==
=== Men ===
Rank	Name	Nation	TFP	SP	FS
1	Adrian Schultheiss	Sweden	2.0	2	1
2	Kim Lucine	France	2.5	1	2
3	Nikita Mikhailov	Russia	5.0	4	3
4	Nikloai Bondar	Belarus	6.5	5	4
5	Moris Pfeifhofer	Switzerland	7.5	6	6
6	Marcel Kotzian	Germany	8.0	6	5
7	Michal Březina	Czech Republic	11.0	8	7
8	Elliot Hilton	United Kingdom	12.5	9	8
9	Maciej Cieplucha	Armenia	12.5	7	9
10	Kutay Eryoldas	Turkey	15.0	10	10
11	Radu Pal	Romania	17.0	12	11
12	Josip Gluhak	Croatia	17.5	11	12

=== Ladies ===
Rant	Name	Nation	TFP	SP	FS
1	Angelina Turenko	Russia	2.0	2	1
2	Nicole Della Monica	Italy	4.0	4	2
3	Ekaterina Proyda	Ukraine	4.5	1	4
4	Laura Dutertre	France	6.5	6	5
5	Mia Brix	Denmark	7.0	8	3
6	Amanda Nylander	Sweden	9.5	5	7
7	Elena Gedevanishvili	Georgia	11.0	10	6
8	Ilona Senderek	Poland	11.5	7	8
9	Tamar Katz	Israel	13.0	6	10
10	Elena Muhhina	Estonia	15.5	9	11
11	Bettina Heim	Switzerland	17.0	16	9
12	Nella Simaová	Czech Republic	18.0	12	12
13	Jody Annandale	United Kingdom	20.5	11	15
14	Barbara Klerk	Belgium	21.5	17	13
15	Rūta Gajauskaitė	Lithuania	23.0	18	14
16	Kaja Otovič	Slovenia	23.5	13	17
17	Elena Kovalova	Latvia	25.0	14	18
18	Sharon Resseler	Netherlands	25.5	19	16
19	Martina Kotradyova	Slovakia	26.5	15	19
20	Gloria Gallego	Spain	30.0	20	20
21	Dora Strabic	Croatia	32.5	21	22
22	Buse Coskun	Turkey	33.0	24	21
23	Roxana Simionescu	Romania	34.5	23	23
24	Lydia Fuentas	Andorra	34.5	21	24
WD	Neda Raković	Serbia and Montenegro		25	
