= Gorshkovo, Ivanovsky District, Ivanovo Oblast =

Gorshkovo Горшково
- Village
- Location within Ivanovo Oblast Location within Russia
- Coordinates: 56°51′N 40°59′E
- Country: Russia
- Region: Ivanovo Oblast
- District: Ivanovsky District
- Time zone: UTC+3:00

Gorshkovo (Russian: Горшково) is a rural locality (a village) in Ivanovsky District, Ivanovo Oblast, Russia. Population: 10 (2010 census);

== Geography ==
This rural locality is located 16 km from Ivanovo (the district's administrative centre and capital of Ivanovo Oblast) and 238 km from Moscow. Golyakovo is the nearest rural locality.
