= Aleksandr Gorshkov =

Aleksandr Gorshkov may refer to:

- Aleksandr Gorshkov (athlete) (1928–1993), Soviet Olympic athlete
- Aleksandr Gorshkov (figure skater) (1946–2022), Soviet (Russian) figure skating champion
- Oleksandr Horshkov (born 1970), Russian-Ukrainian international footballer
