= Figure skating at the 1999 European Youth Olympic Festival =

Figure skating competitions at the 1999 European Youth Olympic Winter Days were held in Poprad-Tatry, Slovakia between March 6 and 12. Skaters competed in the disciplines of men's singles, ladies' singles, and Ice dancing.

== Results ==
=== Men ===
Rank	Name	Nation	TFP	SP	FS
1	Stanislav Timchenko	Russia	1.5	1	1
2	Stéphane Lambiel	Switzerland	3.5	3	2
3	Kristoffer Berntsson	Sweden	5.5	5	3
4	Michael Lubojanski	Germany	6.0	4	4
5	Maxime Duchemin	France	8.0	6	5
6	Vahe Ghazaryan	Armenia	8.0	2	7
7	Gregor Urbas	Slovenia	10.0	8	6
8	Konstantin Tupikov	Ukraine	13.0	10	8
9	Maurice Lim	Netherlands	13.5	9	9
10	Igor Rolinski	Belarus	14.5	7	11
11	Lukas Kuzmiak	Slovakia	15.5	11	10
12	Daniel D'Inca	Italy	18.5	13	12
13	Aidas Reklys	Lithuania	22.0	14	15
14	Michal Matloch	Czech Republic	22.5	19	13
15	Sergei Kotov	Israel	23.0	18	14
16	Aleksei Saks	Estonia	24.0	12	18
17	Tayfun Anar	Turkey	24.5	17	16
18	Dmitrijs Kass	Latvia	24.5	15	17
19	Miguel Ballesteros	Spain	27.0	16	19
20	Panagiotis Zoidis	Greece	30.0	20	20
21	Alan Street	United Kingdom	31.5	21	21

=== Ladies ===
Rant	Name	Nation	TFP	SP	FS
1	Tamara Dorofejev	Hungary	1.5	1	1
2	Sarah Meier	Switzerland	3.0	2	2
3	Svetlana Chernishova	Russia	5.5	5	3
4	Mikkeline Kierkgaard	Denmark	5.5	3	4
5	Susanna Pöykiö	Finland	8.0	4	6
6	Svetlana Pilipenko	Ukraine	10.5	7	7
7	Susanne Stadlmüller	Germany	11.0	6	8
8	Åsa Persson	Sweden	12.0	14	5
9	Iwona Szczepka	Poland	13.0	8	9
10	Christelle Miro	France	16.0	12	10
11	Roxana Luca	Romania	16.0	10	11
12	Vikky Hodges	Germany	19.5	11	14
13	Jessica Lim	Netherlands	20.0	16	12
14	Ellen Mareels	Belgium	22.5	15	15
15	Eva Chudá	Czech Republic	24.0	22	13
16	Viktoryija Dzirko	Belarus	24.5	13	18
17	Diana Janoštáková	Slovakia	25.0	18	16
18	Idora Hegel	Croatia	26.5	9	22
19	Valentina Galfrascoli	Italy	27.5	21	17
20	Jubilee Jenna Mandl	Austria	28.5	17	19
21	Urška Kordič	Slovenia	31.5	23	20
22	Ksenija Jastsenjski	Yugoslavia	33.5	19	24
23	Dominyka Valiukevičiūtė	Lithuania	34.5	27	21
24	Jenifer Tena	Spain	35.0	24	23
25	Maria Levitan	Estonia	36.0	20	26
26	Konstantina Livanou	Greece	37.5	25	25
27	Alexandra Petuško	Latvia	40.0	26	27
28	Zeynep Ozen Perva	Turkey	42.0	28	28

=== Ice dance ===
Rank	Name	Nation	TFP	CD1	CD2	OD	FD
1	Anastasia Litvinenko / Maxim Bolotin	Russia	2.0	1	1	1	1
2	Viktoria Polzykina / Alexander Shakalov	Ukraine	4.4	3	3	2	2
3	Myriam Trividic / Aurelien Geraud	France	5.6	2	2	3	3
4	Nóra Hoffmann / Attila Elek	Hungary	8.0	4	4	4	4
5	Lucie Kadlčáková / Hynek Bílek	Czech Republic	10.0	5	5	5	5
6	Agata Rosłońska / Michał Tomaszewski	Poland	12.2	7	6	6	6
7	Ilaria Webster / Frederico Finazzi	Italy	14.2	8	7	7	7
8	Kerrie Brown / David Hartley	United Kingdom	16.4	9	9	8	8
9	Christina Beier / William Beier	Germany	17.2	6	8	9	9
10	Marina Galić / David Beznar	Bosnia and Herzegovina	20.0	10	10	10	10
