= Russian ship Admiral Gorshkov =

Two ships of the Russian Navy have been named after Admiral of the fleet of the Soviet Union Sergei Georgiyevich Gorshkov, the former commander of the Soviet Navy.

- Soviet aircraft carrier Admiral Gorshkov - a Kiev-class aircraft carrier originally named Baku, and sold to India as INS Vikramaditya in 2004.
- Russian frigate Admiral Gorshkov - the lead ship of her class of general purpose frigate.
