= Rebecca Handke =

German pair skater (born 1986)

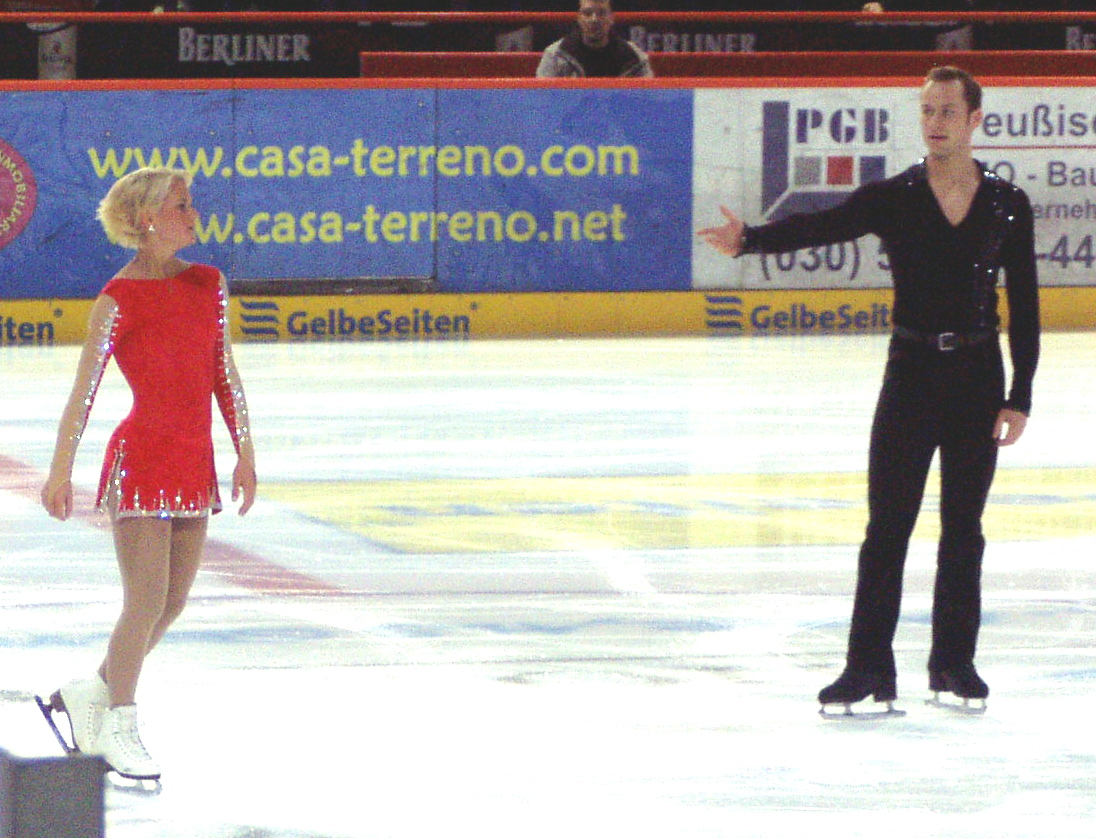
- Handke with Wende in 2006.

Personal information
- Born: 2 October 1986 (age 40) Soest, West Germany
- Height: 1.63 m (5 ft 4 in)

Figure skating career
- Country: Germany
- Skating club: SC Moehnesee
- Retired: 2008

Rebecca Handke (born 2 October 1986 in Soest, West Germany) is a German former pair skater. With partner Daniel Wende, she is the 2005-2006 German national silver medalist.

== Career ==
Rebecca Handke represented the club SC Moehnesee as a pair skater with skating partner Daniel Wende. They were first coached by Julia Gnilozoubova. From 2004 on, their coach was Knut Schubert. After 2004, Handke and Wende trained in Dortmund and in Berlin. The pair achieved their highest international result of 6th at the 2005 European Championships.

In March 2006, Handke had a surgery due to knee problems. Handke and Wende ended their partnership following the 2006–2007 season. She trained for a short time with Canadian skater Christopher Richardson until July 2007, but never competed with him. Handke retired from competitive skating following the 2007–2008 season.

== Personal life ==
Handke attended school at the Conrad-von-Soest-Gymnasium in Soest and passed her Abitur later by long distance studies. On 1 July 2005, she became a member of the Sportsoldatin of the Bundeswehr.

== Programs ==
(with Wende)

Season	Short program	Free skating
2006–2007	Amélie by Yann Tiersen	Poseidon by Klaus Badelt
2005–2006	Amélie by Yann Tiersen	Shakespeare in Love by Stephen Warbeck
2004–2005	Jalousie performed by André Rieu and Orchestra	Dance of the Vampires by Jim Steinman
2003–2004	Music performed by André Rieu and Orchestra	Le Cid by Jules Massenet
2002–2003	Farewell by F. Duval	Le Bonheur d'Amour performed by Richard Clayderman, James Last; Variations on a Theme of Paganini by Andrew Lloyd Webber

== Competitive highlights ==
(with Wende)

Results
International
Event	2001–02	2002–03	2003–04	2004–05	2005–06	2006–07
Europeans		13th	10th	6th	8th	12th
GP Bompard					8th	
GP Skate America					7th	
Bofrost Cup			4th	3rd		
Nebelhorn					7th	
International: Junior
Junior Worlds			11th	WD		
JGP Croatia			7th			
JGP Germany		8th				
JGP Poland			7th			
JGP Serbia				8th		
EYOF		2nd J.				
Nordics				2nd J.		
National
German Champ.	1st N.	1st J.	1st J.	2nd	2nd	
GP = Grand Prix; JGP = Junior Grand Prix; WD = Withdrew; Levels: N. = Novice; J. = Junior
