= Gorshkovo, Vologodsky District, Vologda Oblast =

Gorshkovo Горшково
- Village
- Location within Vologda Oblast Location within Russia
- Coordinates: 59°12′N 39°46′E
- Country: Russia
- Region: Vologda Oblast
- District: Vologodsky District
- Time zone: UTC+3:00

Gorshkovo (Russian: Горшково) is a rural locality (a village) in Leskovskoye Rural Settlement, Vologodsky District, Vologda Oblast, Russia. The population was 3 as of 2002.

== Geography ==
Gorshkovo is located 9 km west of Vologda (the district's administrative centre) by road. Vysokovo is the nearest rural locality.
