= Gordei Gorshkov =

Russian figure skater

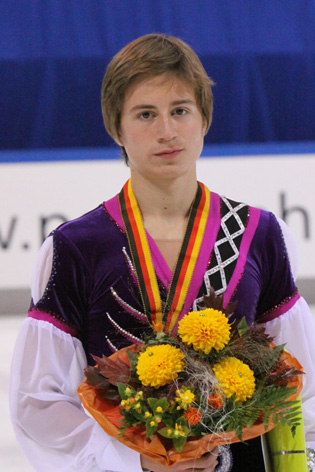
- Gorshkov in 2009

Personal information
- Native name: Гордей Олегович Горшков
- Full name: Gordei Olegovich Gorshkov
- Born: 11 February 1993 (age 33) Saint Petersburg, Russia
- Height: 1.73 m (5 ft 8 in)

Figure skating career
- Country: Russia
- Coach: Evgeni Rukavicin
- Skating club: St. Petersburg Olympic School
- Began skating: 1999
Medal record
Figure skating: Men's singles
Representing Russia
Winter Universiade
Silver medal – second place	2013 Trentino	Men's singles
European Youth Olympic Festival
Bronze medal – third place	2009 Cieszyn	Men's singles

Gordei Olegovich Gorshkov (Russian: Гордей Олегович Горшков; born 11 February 1993) is a Russian former figure skater. He is the 2013 Winter Universiade silver medalist, the 2013 Ice Challenge bronze medalist, and a four-time medalist on the ISU Junior Grand Prix series.

== Personal life ==
Gordei Olegovich Gorshkov was born on 11 February 1993 in Saint Petersburg, Russia, the son of former competitive figure skaters. His parents, Svetlana Frantsuzova and Oleg Gorshkov, are the 1985 Winter Universiade bronze medalists in pair skating.

== Career ==
Gorshkov made his ISU Junior Grand Prix (JGP) debut in the 2007–08 season, finishing 8th in Bulgaria. He won a pair of bronze medals during the 2009–10 JGP series.

Gorshkov won a silver medal and placed 4th at his JGP events in 2010. He qualified for the JGP Final where he finished 8th. He won bronze at the 2011 Russian Junior Championships and was sent to the 2011 Junior Worlds, where he ranked 9th. The next season, Gorshkov took silver in his sole JGP event. He was coached by Alexei Urmanov for a number of years.

In autumn 2012, Gorshkov decided to try pair skating. He chose to return to single skating and made his senior international debut at the 2013 Ice Challenge where he won the bronze medal. He then won silver at the 2013 Winter Universiade.

Gorshkov finished 5th at the 2015 Russian Championships and 4th at the 2016 Russian Championships.

== Programs ==
Season	Short program	Free skating
2016–17	Una furtiva lagrima by Gaetano Donizetti	The Great Gig in the Sky; Money by Pink Floyd
2015–16	Sexual Revolution by Roger Waters	The Swan by Joshua Bell; Francesca da Rimini by Pyotr Ilyich Tchaikovsky
2013–14	Sarabande Suite by Globus; O Fortuna (from Carmina Burana) by Carl Orff	The Prophet; The Messiah Will Come Again by Gary Moore
2011–12	Winter (from Four Seasons) by Antonio Vivaldi	Notre-Dame de Paris by Riccardo Cocciante

== Competitive highlights ==
GP: Grand Prix; CS: Challenger Series; JGP: Junior Grand Prix

International
Event	07–08	08–09	09–10	10–11	11–12	12–13	13–14	14–15	15–16	16–17
GP Rostelecom Cup										9th
CS Golden Spin									4th	
CS Nepela Memorial								3rd	3rd	5th
CS Volvo Open Cup								2nd		
Universiade							2nd	5th		
Ice Challenge							3rd			
International: Junior
Junior Worlds				9th						
JGP Final				8th						
JGP Austria					2nd					
JGP Bulgaria	8th									
JGP Germany			3rd	2nd						
JGP Japan				4th						
JGP Poland			3rd							
EYOF		3rd J								
NRW Trophy	2nd J									
National
Russian	12th		8th	6th	8th		12th	5th	4th	
Russian Junior	8th	6th	4th	3rd						
J = Junior level; TBD = Assigned

== Detailed results ==
Small medals for short and free programs awarded only at ISU Championships.

2016–17 season
Date	Event	SP	FS	Total
4–6 November 2016	2016 Rostelecom Cup	9; 73.37	7; 150.14	9; 223.51
30 September – 2 October 2016	2016 CS Ondrej Nepela Memorial	3; 71.73	7; 137.11	5; 208.84
2015–16 season
Date	Event	SP	FS	Total
23–27 December 2015	2016 Russian Championships	4; 82.26	4; 164.70	4; 246.96
2–5 December 2015	2015 CS Golden Spin of Zagreb	2; 76.50	4; 146.22	4; 222.72
1–3 October 2015	2015 Ondrej Nepela Trophy	3; 76.25	2; 147.00	3; 223.25
2014–15 season
Date	Event	SP	FS	Total
4–8 February 2015	2015 Universiade	5; 66.31	5; 136.85	5; 203.16
24–28 December 2014	2015 Russian Championships	7; 75.29	4; 153.27	5; 228.56
5–9 November 2014	2014 CS Volvo Open Cup	2; 72.17	2; 132.91	2; 205.08
1–5 October 2014	2014 Ondrej Nepela Trophy	3; 67.70	2; 138.85	3; 206.55
2013–14 season
Date	Event	SP	FS	Total
24–27 December 2013	2014 Russian Championships	9; 70.73	14; 125.99	12; 196.72
11–12 December 2013	2013 Universiade	2; 70.73	1; 142.79	2; 213.52
