= Gorshkovo, Privolzhsky District, Ivanovo Oblast =

Gorshkovo Горшково
- Village
- Location within Ivanovo Oblast Location within Russia
- Coordinates: 57°25′N 41°33′E
- Country: Russia
- Region: Ivanovo Oblast
- District: Privolzhsky District
- Time zone: UTC+3:00

Gorshkovo (Russian: Горшково) is a rural locality (a village) in Privolzhsky District, Ivanovo Oblast, Russia. Population: 84 (2010 census);

== Geography ==
This rural locality is located 17 kilometres (11 mi) from Privolzhsk (the district's administrative centre), 60 kilometres (37 mi) from Ivanovo (capital of Ivanovo Oblast) and 301 kilometres (187 mi) from Moscow. Shalyapino is the nearest rural locality.
