= Figure skating at the 1997 European Youth Olympic Winter Days =

Figure skating at the 1997 European Youth Olympic Winter Days were held in Sundsvall, Sweden between February 7 and 12, 1997. Skaters competed in the disciplines of men's singles, ladies' singles, and ice dancing.

== Results ==
=== Men ===
Rank	Name	Nation	TFP	SP	FS
1	Evgeni Plushenko	Russia	1.5	1	1
2	Vakhtang Murvanidze	GEO	4.0	4	2
3	Oleksandr Smokvin	Ukraine	5.5	5	3
4	Nicolas Beaudelin	France	6.5	3	5
5	Arvid Horst	Germany	7.5	7	4
6	Lukáš Rakowski	Czech Republic	8.0	2	7
7	Juraj Sviatko	Slovakia	9.0	6	6
8	Alex Gruber	Israel	13.5	9	8
9	Alan Street	United Kingdom	13.0	8	9
10	Yon Garcia	Spain	15.0	10	10
11	Andrej Gorkic	Slovenia	16.5	11	11
12	Aleksei Saks	Estonia	18.0	12	12
13	Tero Hämäläinen	Finland	20.0	14	13
14	Edgar Grigoryan	Armenia	20.5	13	14
15	Balint Miklos	Romania	23.0	16	15
16	Panayotis Markouizos	Greece	23.5	15	16

=== Ladies ===
Rant	Name	Nation	TFP	SP	FS
1	Julia Soldatova	Russia	1.5	1	1
2	Julia Lautowa	Austria	3.0	2	2
3	Gwenaëlle Jullien	France	5.5	5	3
4	Sabina Wojtala	Poland	6.0	4	4
5	Andrea Diewald	Germany	6.5	3	5
6	Diána Póth	Hungary	10.0	6	7
7	Ekaterina Golovatenko	Estonia	11.5	7	8
8	Anna Lundström	Sweden	13.5	9	9
9	Galina Maniachenko	Ukraine	14.0	16	6
10	Simone Walthard	Switzerland	15.0	10	10
11	Tina Svajger	Slovenia	16.5	11	11
12	Miia Marttinen	Finland	17.0	8	13
13	Ellen Mareels	Belgium	19.5	15	12
14	Katerina Blohonova	Czech Republic	21.0	14	14
15	Zuzana Burakova	Slovakia	22.5	13	16
16	Kelly Marie McDermott	United Kingdom	23.0	12	17
17	Meritxell Baraut	Spain	23.5	17	15
18	Ksenija Jastsenjski	Yugoslavia	27.0	18	18
19	Konstantina Livanou	Greece	28.5	19	19
20	Noemi Bedo	Romania	30.0	20	20
21	Merine Tadevosyan	Armenia	32.0	22	21
22	Aret Boronat	Andorra	32.5	21	22
23	Indre Bukelskyte	Lithuania	34.5	23	23

=== Ice dance ===
Rank	Name	Nation	TFP	CD1	CD2	OD	FD
1	Federica Faiella / Luciano Milo	Italy	2.0	1	1	1	1
2	Melanie Espejo / Michael Zenezini	France	4.0	2	2	2	2
3	Eliane Hugentobler / Daniel Hugentobler	Switzerland	6.2	4	3	3	3
4	Natalia Romaniuta / Daniil Barantsev	Russia	7.8	3	4	4	4
5	Zita Gebora / Andras Visontai	Hungary	10.8	6	5	6	5
6	Gabriela Hrázská / Jiří Procházka	Czech Republic	11.2	5	6	5	6
7	Kristina Kobaladze / Oleg Voiko	Ukraine	14.0	7	7	7	7
8	Daniela Ivanova / Roumen Iordanov	Bulgaria	16.2	9	8	8	8
9	Amanda Jane Galloway / Christopher Lomax	United Kingdom	17.8	8	9	9	9
10	Pia-Maria Gustafsson / Antti Grönlund	Finland	20.0	10	10	10	10
