= Figure skating at the 2011 European Youth Olympic Festival =

- Date: February 12 – 19
- Season: 2010–11
- Location: Liberec, Czech Republic
- Venue: Tipsort Arena

Champions
- Men's singles: (Czech Republic) Petr Coufal
- Ladies' singles: (Russia) Polina Agafonova
- Previous: 2009 European Youth Olympic Winter Festival
- Next: 2013 European Youth Olympic Winter Festival

Figure skating at the 2011 European Youth Olympic Winter Festival took place at the Tipsort Arena in Liberec, Czech Republic between February 12 and 19, 2011. Skaters competed in the disciplines of men's singles and ladies' singles.

== Medal summary ==
=== Medalists ===
| Event | Gold | Silver | Bronze |
|---|---|---|---|
| Men | Petr Coufal (CZE) | Maxim Kovtun (RUS) | Simon Hocquaux (FRA) |
| Women | Polina Agafonova (RUS) | Ira Vannut (BEL) | Monika Simančíková (SVK) |

=== Medal table ===
| Rank | Nation | Gold | Silver | Bronze | Total |
|---|---|---|---|---|---|
| 1 | Russia (RUS) | 1 | 1 | 0 | 2 |
| 2 | Czech Republic (CZE) | 1 | 0 | 0 | 1 |
| 3 | Belgium (BEL) | 0 | 1 | 0 | 1 |
| 4 | France (FRA) | 0 | 0 | 1 | 1 |
| 4 | Slovakia (SVK) | 0 | 0 | 1 | 1 |
| Totals (5 entries) | | 2 | 2 | 2 | 6 |

== Results ==
=== Men ===
| Rank | Name | Nation | Total points | SP | | FS | |
|---|---|---|---|---|---|---|---|
| 1 | Petr Coufal | Czech Republic | 169.73 | 3 | 51.62 | 1 | 118.11 |
| 2 | Maxim Kovtun | Russia | 161.75 | 1 | 57.30 | 2 | 104.45 |
| 3 | Simon Hocquaux | France | 151.04 | 4 | 50.57 | 3 | 100.47 |
| 4 | Matthias Versluis | Finland | 146.96 | 2 | 51.96 | 4 | 95.00 |
| 5 | Slavik Hayrapetyan | Armenia | 127.40 | 5 | 45.17 | 6 | 82.23 |
| 6 | Kamil Dymowski | Poland | 118.43 | 12 | 34.36 | 5 | 84.07 |
| 7 | Jemie Whiteman | United Kingdom | 118.37 | 10 | 37.90 | 8 | 80.47 |
| 8 | Anton Kempf | Germany | 117.53 | 11 | 35.54 | 7 | 81.99 |
| 9 | Victor Bustamante | Spain | 117.52 | 6 | 40.42 | 9 | 77.10 |
| 10 | Carlo Roethlisberger | Switzerland | 110.87 | 9 | 38.09 | 10 | 72.78 |
| 11 | Carlo Vittorio Palermo | Italy | 108.87 | 7 | 39.07 | 12 | 69.80 |
| 12 | Nicky Obreykov | Sweden | 108.17 | 8 | 38.34 | 11 | 69.83 |
| 13 | Burak Demirboga | Turkey | 97.14 | 13 | 32.10 | 14 | 65.04 |
| 14 | Peter Novella | Slovakia | 94.74 | 16 | 28.17 | 13 | 66.57 |
| 15 | Pavel Strakach | Belarus | 91.53 | 14 | 30.08 | 15 | 61.45 |
| 16 | Arturas Ganzela | Lithuania | 91.04 | 15 | 30.00 | 16 | 61.04 |
| 17 | Samuel Koppel | Estonia | 81.26 | 17 | 27.75 | 17 | 53.51 |
| 18 | Mislav Blagojević | Croatia | 64.46 | 18 | 24.10 | 18 | 40.36 |

=== Ladies ===
| Rank | Name | Nation | Total points | SP | | FS | |
|---|---|---|---|---|---|---|---|
| 1 | Polina Agafonova | Russia | 164.06 | 1 | 57.80 | 1 | 106.25 |
| 2 | Ira Vannut | Belgium | 152.50 | 2 | 52.86 | 2 | 99.64 |
| 3 | Monika Simančíková | Slovakia | 137.57 | 4 | 47.20 | 3 | 90.37 |
| 4 | Lénaëlle Gilleron-Gorry | France | 136.27 | 3 | 48.32 | 4 | 87.95 |
| 5 | Alina Fjodorova | Latvia | 122.80 | 5 | 45.38 | 8 | 77.42 |
| 6 | Alina Milevska | Ukraine | 121.18 | 6 | 44.30 | 9 | 76.88 |
| 7 | Rebecka Emanuelsson | Sweden | 120.94 | 12 | 38.14 | 5 | 82.80 |
| 8 | Timila Shrestha | Finland | 118.21 | 10 | 38.36 | 6 | 79.85 |
| 9 | Patricia Gleščič | Slovenia | 116.89 | 7 | 42.66 | 10 | 74.23 |
| 10 | Victoria Hubler | Austria | 116.38 | 13 | 38.02 | 7 | 78.36 |
| 11 | Jasmine Alexandra Costa | Estonia | 115.89 | 8 | 42.16 | 11 | 73.43 |
| 12 | Christina Erdel | Germany | 111.11 | 9 | 41.26 | 14 | 69.85 |
| 13 | Anita Anderberg Madsen | Denmark | 105.03 | 19 | 33.58 | 13 | 71.45 |
| 14 | Tina Sturzinger | Switzerland | 104.57 | 23 | 31.28 | 12 | 73.29 |
| 15 | Regina Borbely | Hungary | 104.34 | 14 | 35.58 | 16 | 68.76 |
| 16 | Caterina Andermacher | Italy | 104.27 | 18 | 34.86 | 15 | 69.41 |
| 17 | Kseniya Bakusheva | Belarus | 102.28 | 17 | 35.06 | 17 | 67.22 |
| 18 | Marta Grigoryan | Armenia | 100.58 | 16 | 35.34 | 19 | 65.24 |
| 19 | Rimgaile Meskaite | Lithuania | 99.97 | 15 | 35.40 | 20 | 64.57 |
| 20 | Eliška Březinová | Czech Republic | 98.57 | 11 | 38.14 | 22 | 60.43 |
| 21 | Sabina Ionana Mariuta | Romania | 97.54 | 21 | 31.50 | 18 | 66.04 |
| 22 | Natasha McKay | United Kingdom | 95.75 | 22 | 31.42 | 21 | 64.33 |
| 23 | María Jiménez | Spain | 89.42 | 24 | 31.10 | 23 | 58.32 |
| 24 | Paulina Turkowska | Poland | 88.49 | 20 | 32.48 | 24 | 56.01 |
| 25 | Petra Juric | Croatia | 83.48 | 25 | 30.10 | 27 | 52.61 |
| 26 | Isabella Schuster | Greece | 82.07 | 26 | 27.96 | 26 | 54.11 |
| 27 | Nora Kristine Stenersen | Norway | 81.00 | 27 | 26.14 | 25 | 54.86 |
| 28 | Heidbjort Arney Hoskuldsdottir | Iceland | 77.46 | 28 | 24.90 | 28 | 52.56 |
| 29 | Ecem Ertenli | Turkey | 62.14 | 29 | 20.00 | 29 | 42.14 |
| 30 | Arijana Tirak | Bosnia and Herzegovina | 49.19 | 30 | 17.46 | 30 | 31.73 |
