= Vanessa Gusméroli =

French figure skater and water skier

Vanessa Gutsmeroli
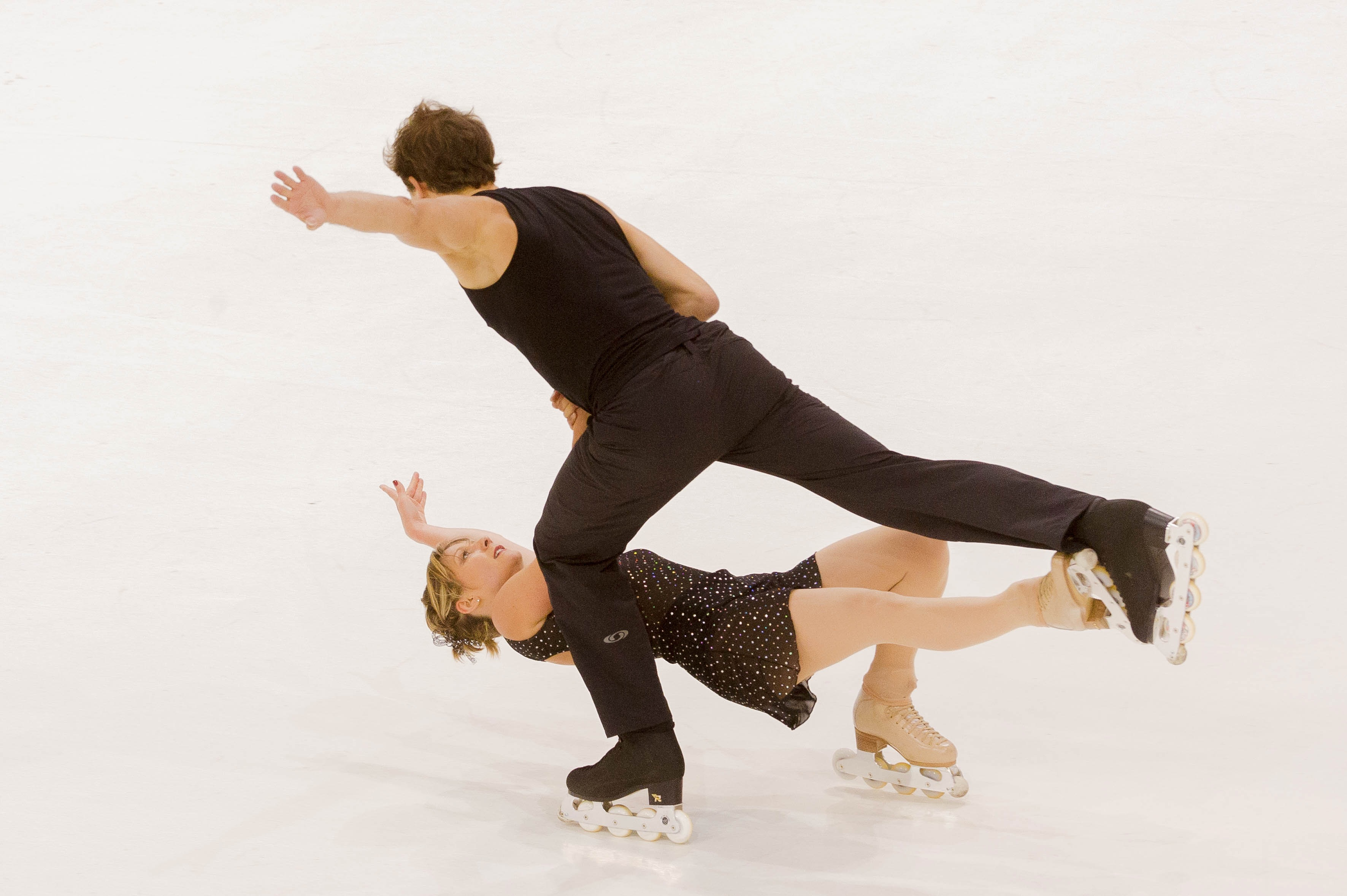
- Gusméroli in 2024

Personal information
- Born: 19 September 1978 (age 47) Annecy, France
- Height: 1.60 m (5 ft 3 in)

Figure skating career
- Country: France
- Began skating: 1984
- Retired: 2003
Medal record
Representing France
Figure skating: Ladies' singles
World Championships
Bronze medal – third place	1997 Lausanne	Ladies' singles

Vanessa Gusmeroli (born 19 September 1978) is a French former competitive figure skater and water skier. As a skater, she is the 1997 World bronze medalist and a three-time (2000–02) French national champion.

== Personal life ==
Gusmeroli was born on 19 September 1978 in Annecy, Haute-Savoie, France. She and French ice dancer Mathieu Jost are the parents of a daughter, born in 2009.

== Skating career ==
Vanessa Gusmeroli began skating at age seven in Annecy. She competed in both skating and water skiing until the age of 14, when she was advised to commit to one sport and chose her skating career.

=== 1995–96 season ===
Gusmeroli first drew international attention at the World Junior Championships in the fall of 1995, where she finished 5th overall. The French Figure Skating Federation sent her to the 1996 European Championships. She placed 6th in the short program, with a triple flip-double toe loop combination, but was 10th in the free skate, dropping her to 8th overall. At the 1996 Worlds in Canada, she finished in 14th place.

=== 1996–97 season ===
In her second senior season, Gusmeroli returned to her "Circus" themed free skate and used the music from the motion picture, "The Mask" for her short program. She represented the International team at The Continents Cup and finished 4th in the ladies portion. She also placed 4th at Trophée Lalique in Paris and won her first international medal a week later at The Nations Cup and her first medal at The French National Championships, a silver, in December 1996. Gusmeroli placed 2nd in the short program at the 1997 European Championships, but dropped to sixth overall after a difficult free skate. She was also second in the short program at the 1997 World Championships in Lausanne and finished with the bronze medal after placing fourth in the free skate and third overall. It was her only podium finish at an ISU Championships.

=== 1997–98 season ===
Gusmeroli experienced ups and downs during the 1997-98 season. She won the bronze medal at Trophée Lalique behind Laetitia Hubert and Tara Lipinski. With a theme of "Water, Earth, Wind and Fire" for her free skate, she won a spot on the Olympic team by finishing third at the French National Championships, but was only 11th at the European Championship. At the 1998 Winter Olympic Games, a mistake in the short program cost her a chance at a medal, but she recovered with a strong free skate to finish 6th overall. With the added pressure to defend her bronze medal at the World Championships, she faltered and finished in 16th place.

=== 1998–99 season ===
Gusmeroli returned in better form in the 1998-99 season, once again winning the bronze medal at Trophée Lalique and silver at French Nationals. In her free skate, she portrayed a bank robber, an original theme that drew much attention. At the 1999 World Championships, Gusmeroli skated to a third-place finish in the short program, but an error on the triple flip in the free skate dropped her to 5th.

=== 1999–2000 season ===
A foot injury forced Gusmeroli out of the 1999-2000 Grand Prix season. She made a coaching change, moving from Didier Lucine to Stanislav Leonovitch. Debuting a free skate to the Legends of the Fall soundtrack, Gusmeroli won her first French National Championship and finished 4th at the Japan Open in January 2000. At the European Championships in Vienna, Gusmeroli skated well in all three portions of the competition, concluding her free skate in tears. She finished in 4th place overall because of her placement in the qualifying round. At the 2000 World Championships in Nice, Gusmeroli skated poorly in the qualifying group and lost her chance at a medal but her short and free programs moved her up into 4th overall.

=== 2000–01 season ===
Gusmeroli did not enjoy great success the next season. She debuted a new free skate to "Joan of Arc", but later changed back to "Legends of the Fall". She finished 9th at both the European and World Championships in 2001.

=== 2001–02 season ===
In the fall of 2001, Gusmeroli won the Karl Schaefer Memorial in Vienna and placed 10th at Trophée Lalique. She captured her 3rd French title in December and went on to place 11th at Europeans. Facing tough competition at the 2002 Winter Olympic Games in Salt Lake City, Utah, she skated a clean short program, but only placed 10th. In the free skate, she could only manage three triples and ended the competition in 16th place.

=== Post-competitive career ===
Gusmeroli is a technical specialist for the International Skating Union and served in the role during the ladies figure skating competition at the 2014 Winter Olympics. Since 2008 she has also coached figure skating in Geneva.

== Water ski career ==
Gusmeroli won the junior European title in water skiing. She was awarded the silver medal at the 2003 European Water Ski Championships.

== Programs ==
Season	Short program	Free skating
2003–04	Crouching Tiger, Hidden Dragon by Tan Dun	Blue Nucturne by Jonathan Kain; Blues de Plume by Henri Torgue; About Passing by Zbigniew Preisner
2000–01	Jazz	Legends of the Fall by James Horner; Jeanne d'Arc by Éric Serra

== Competitive highlights ==
GP: Champions Series / Grand Prix

International
Event	92–93	93–94	94–95	95–96	96–97	97–98	98–99	99–00	00–01	01–02	02-03	03-04
Olympics						6th				16th		
Worlds				14th	3rd	16th	5th	4th	9th			
Europeans				8th	6th	11th	5th	4th	9th	11th		
GP Lalique					4th	3rd	3rd		4th	10th		
GP Nations/Spark.					3rd				6th			
GP NHK Trophy				6th		4th	5th					
GP Skate America					7th							
GP Skate Canada						7th						
Golden Spin		1st					3rd					
Nepela Memorial				2nd								
Schäfer Memorial				7th						1st		
St. Gervais		10th	3rd	3rd								
Cup of Nice												2nd
International: Junior
Junior Worlds			5th	6th								
EYOF	3rd		2nd									
Blue Swords		11th J		4th J								
Gardena			7th J									
Grand Prize SNP		1st J										
Triglav Trophy		2nd J										
National
French Champ.		7th	5th		2nd	3rd	2nd	1st	1st	1st	WD	
J: Junior level
