= Figure skating at the 2007 European Youth Olympic Festival =

Figure skating competitions at the 2007 European Youth Olympic Winter Festival took place at the Jaca Arena in Jaca, Spain between February 19 and 22, 2007. Skaters competed in the disciplines of men's singles and ladies' singles.

== Results ==
=== Men ===
Rank	Name	Nation	Total points	SP		FS	
1	Artem Grigoryev	Russia	154.71	1	53.74	2	100.97
2	Alexander Majorov	Sweden	152.94	3	51.66	1	101.28
3	Alexandre Briancon	France	140.68	2	52.59	4	88.09
4	Javier Fernández	Spain	134.14	4	42.64	3	91.50
5	Jakub Strobl	Slovakia	116.22	8	40.07	6	76.15
6	Daniel Dotzauer	Germany	115.70	9	37.38	5	78.32
7	Otto-Eemelia Laamanen	Finland	114.31	6	42.01	7	72.30
8	Stanilav Pertsov	Ukraine	113.47	5	42.60	8	70.87
9	Hovhannes Mkrtchyan	Armenia	103.61	12	35.08	9	68.53
10	Petr Bidar	Czech Republic	103.10	7	41.96	13	61.14
11	Edwin Siwkowski	Poland	99.96	15	32.33	10	67.63
12	Daniel King	United Kingdom	99.90	13	33.54	11	66.36
13	Ruben Blommaert	Belgium	96.46	11	35.53	14	60.93
14	Laurent Alvarez	Switzerland	94.45	14	32.67	12	61.78
15	Severin Kiefer	Austria	93.57	10	35.89	15	57.68
16	Mikhail Karaliuk	Belarus	77.09	16	26.75	16	50.34
17	Saulius Ambrulevičius	Lithuania	73.70	17	25.62	17	48.08
18	Ivor Mikolčević	Croatia	66.80	18	24.07	19	42.73
19	Ali Demirboga	Turkey	63.26	19	19.97	18	43.29
20	Pavel Petrov Savinov	Bulgaria	50.26	20	18.60	20	31.66

=== Ladies ===
Rant	Name	Nation	Total points	SP		FS	
1	Sonia Lafuente	Spain	107.42	5	39.16	2	68.26
2	Margarita Tertychnaya	Russia	106.21	1	44.70	4	61.51
3	Marcella De Trovato	Italy	103.75	2	43.47	5	60.28
4	Radka Bártová	Slovakia	102.97	6	34.44	1	68.53
5	Anna Veinberger	France	102.43	4	40.47	3	61.96
6	Katharina Gierock	Germany	99.87	3	40.93	6	58.94
7	Katrin Kunisch	Austria	91.05	7	34.43	7	56.62
8	Amy Leigh Tanner	United Kingdom	84.00	9	31.97	11	52.03
9	Noemie Silberer	Switzerland	83.98	8	32.93	12	51.05
10	Laura Czarnotta	Poland	83.87	15	30.53	9	53.34
11	Angelica Olsson	Sweden	82.39	10	31.83	14	50.56
12	Anastasija Uspenska	Slovenia	82.06	23	27.57	8	54.49
13	Maria Dikanović	Croatia	80.87	11	31.64	18	49.23
14	Laurie Lougsami	Belgium	80.84	12	31.53	17	49.31
15	Erle Harstad	Norway	80.51	21	27.83	10	52.68
16	Stasija Rage	Latvia	79.97	16	28.94	13	51.03
17	Devora Radeva	Bulgaria	77.33	19	27.98	15	49.35
18	Tuuli Nikoskinen	Finland	77.24	20	27.91	16	49.33
19	Michelle Tromborg-Nielsen	Denmark	76.44	14	30.86	19	45.58
20	Jenna Syken	Israel	73.27	13	31.08	23	42.19
21	Yuna Drabysheuskaya	Belarus	72.93	17	28.29	20	44.64
22	Armine Stamboltsyan	Armenia	70.32	18	28.02	22	42.30
23	Karmen Piirsoo	Estonia	66.54	22	27.61	25	38.93
24	Alena Gaydarenko	Ukraine	64.32	28	20.65	21	43.67
25	Tunde Sepa	Hungary	62.54	25	23.54	24	39.00
26	Beatrice Rozinskaite	Lithuania	58.87	26	23.46	26	35.41
27	Ekin Dogany	Turkey	58.08	24	23.55	27	34.53
28	Dimitra Tsitampani	Greece	55.25	27	21.76	28	33.49
29	Jovana Stanisavljević	Serbia and Montenegro	47.26	29	15.03	29	32.23
