= 2002 World Junior Figure Skating Championships =

- Type: ISU Championship
- Date: March 3 – 10
- Season: 2001–02
- Location: Hamar, Norway
- Venue: Hamar Olympic Amphitheatre

Champions
- Men's singles: (Japan) Daisuke Takahashi
- Ladies' singles: (United States) Ann Patrice McDonough
- Pairs: (Russia) Elena Riabchuk / Stanislav Zakharov
- Ice dance: (United States) Tanith Belbin / Benjamin Agosto
- Previous: 2001 World Junior Championships
- Next: 2003 World Junior Championships

The 2002 World Junior Figure Skating Championships was held from March 3 to 10 at the Hamar Olympic Amphitheatre in Hamar, Norway. Medals were awarded in men's singles, ladies' singles, pair skating, and ice dancing. Due to the large number of participants, the men's and ladies' qualifying groups were split into groups A and B. The first compulsory dance was the Viennese Waltz and the second was the Quickstep.

== Medals table ==
| Rank | Nation | Gold | Silver | Bronze | Total |
|---|---|---|---|---|---|
| 1 | United States (USA) | 2 | 0 | 0 | 2 |
| 2 | Russia (RUS) | 1 | 2 | 2 | 5 |
| 3 | Japan (JPN) | 1 | 1 | 1 | 3 |
| 4 | Belgium (BEL) | 0 | 1 | 0 | 1 |
| 5 | China (CHN) | 0 | 0 | 1 | 1 |
| Totals (5 entries) | | 4 | 4 | 4 | 12 |

== Results ==
=== Men ===
Daisuke Takahashi was the first Japanese male skater to win the ISU World Junior Championships."International Skating Union". Archived from the original on 2012-03-24.

Kevin van der Perren was the first Belgian skater ever to take a medal (silver) at an ISU World Junior Championships."International Skating Union". Archived from the original on 2012-03-24.

| Rank | Name | Nation | QB | QA | SP | FS |
|---|---|---|---|---|---|---|
| 1 | Daisuke Takahashi | Japan | 1 | | 1 | 2 |
| 2 | Kevin van der Perren | Belgium | 2 | | 3 | 1 |
| 3 | Stanislav Timchenko | Russia | 5 | | 2 | 3 |
| 4 | Ma Xiaodong | China | | 1 | 4 | 5 |
| 5 | Damien Djordievic | France | 3 | | 5 | 4 |
| 6 | Gregor Urbas | Slovenia | | 4 | 8 | 7 |
| 7 | Nicholas Young | Canada | 6 | | 9 | 6 |
| 8 | Yannick Ponsero | France | | 3 | 10 | 8 |
| 9 | Ma Yingdi | China | | 6 | 12 | 10 |
| 10 | Nicholas LaRoche | United States | | 5 | 6 | 14 |
| 11 | Shawn Sawyer | Canada | 12 | | 14 | 9 |
| 12 | Ari-Pekka Nurmenkari | Finland | 10 | | 11 | 12 |
| 13 | Anton Kovalevski | Ukraine | 7 | | 16 | 11 |
| 14 | Andrei Griazev | Russia | | 9 | 7 | 17 |
| 15 | Ryan Bradley | United States | 4 | | 15 | 15 |
| 16 | Shaun Rogers | United States | 8 | | 19 | 13 |
| 17 | Jean-Michel Debay | France | | 2 | 20 | 16 |
| 18 | Jamal Othman | Switzerland | 9 | | 13 | 20 |
| 19 | Andrei Dobrokhodov | Azerbaijan | | 7 | 21 | 18 |
| 20 | Martin Liebers | Germany | 14 | | 17 | 19 |
| 21 | Paolo Bacchini | Italy | | 10 | 18 | 24 |
| 22 | Tristan Cousins | United Kingdom | | 8 | 23 | 23 |
| 23 | Maciej Kuś | Poland | 15 | | 22 | 21 |
| 24 | Matthew Wilkinson | United Kingdom | 11 | | 25 | 22 |
Free Skating Not Reached
| 25 | Sergei Kotov | Israel | 13 | | 24 | |
| 26 | Bertalan Zakany | Hungary | | 11 | 26 | |
| 27 | Niklas Hogner | Sweden | | 13 | 28 | |
| 28 | Ivan Kinčik | Slovakia | | 15 | 27 | |
| 29 | Lee Dong-whun | South Korea | | 12 | 30 | |
| 30 | Michal Matloch | Czech Republic | | 14 | 29 | |
Short Program Not Reached
| 31 | Daniel Harries | Australia | 16 | | | |
| 32 | Dmitri Malochnikov | Belarus | | 16 | | |
| 33 | Vladimir Belomoin | Uzbekistan | | 17 | | |
| 34 | Adrian Matei | Romania | 17 | | | |
| 35 | Alper Uçar | Turkey | | 18 | | |
| 36 | Benedict Wu | Chinese Taipei | 18 | | | |
| 37 | Marc Gironella | Spain | 19 | | | |
| 38 | Manuel Segura | Mexico | | 19 | | |
| 39 | Marc Casal | Andorra | 20 | | | |
| 40 | Gegham Vardanyan | Armenia | | 20 | | |

=== Ladies ===
| Rank | Name | Nation | QB | QA | SP | FS |
|---|---|---|---|---|---|---|
| 1 | Ann Patrice McDonough | United States | 1 | | 1 | 1 |
| 2 | Yukari Nakano | Japan | | 2 | 3 | 2 |
| 3 | Miki Ando | Japan | | 1 | 4 | 3 |
| 4 | Beatrisa Liang | United States | | 3 | 5 | 6 |
| 5 | Joannie Rochette | Canada | 2 | | 8 | 5 |
| 6 | Louann Donovan | United States | 3 | | 11 | 4 |
| 7 | Stephanie Zhang | Australia | 4 | | 2 | 10 |
| 8 | Lauren Wilson | Canada | | 4 | 10 | 7 |
| 9 | Yukina Ota | Japan | 6 | | 6 | 9 |
| 10 | Carolina Kostner | Italy | | 10 | 9 | 8 |
| 11 | Kristina Oblasova | Russia | | 11 | 7 | 12 |
| 12 | Jenna McCorkell | United Kingdom | 10 | | 12 | 13 |
| 13 | Viktória Pavuk | Hungary | | 5 | 20 | 11 |
| 14 | Åsa Persson | Sweden | 9 | | 14 | 14 |
| 15 | Roxana Luca | Romania | 8 | | 13 | 17 |
| 16 | Susanne Stadlmüller | Germany | | 9 | 15 | 16 |
| 17 | Tatiana Basova | Russia | 5 | | 18 | 18 |
| 18 | Kimena Brog-Meier | Switzerland | | 6 | 23 | 15 |
| 19 | Magdalena Leska | Poland | 13 | | 17 | 20 |
| 20 | Ekaterina Burtseva | Russia | | 7 | 16 | 23 |
| 21 | Sara Falotico | Belgium | | 8 | 19 | 21 |
| 22 | Svetlana Pilipenko | Ukraine | | 12 | 21 | 19 |
| 23 | Sari Hakola | Finland | 7 | | 22 | 22 |
| 24 | Silvia Koncokova | Slovakia | 11 | | 25 | 24 |
| 25 | Madeleine Daleng | Norway | | 18 | 31 | 25 |
Free Skating Not Reached
| 26 | Jubilee-Jenna Mandl | Austria | | 13 | 24 | |
| 27 | Jenna-Anne Buys | South Africa | 14 | | 26 | |
| 28 | Henna Hietala | Finland | | 15 | 27 | |
| 29 | Lucie Krausová | Czech Republic | 12 | | 29 | |
| 30 | Kristina Michailova | Belarus | 15 | | 28 | |
| 31 | Gintarė Vostrecovaitė | Lithuania | | 14 | 30 | |
Short Program Not Reached
| 32 | Lee Sun-bin | South Korea | | 16 | | |
| 33 | Wang Qingyun | China | 16 | | | |
| 34 | Christiane Berger | Germany | | 17 | | |
| 35 | Martine Zuiderwijk | Netherlands | 17 | | | |
| 36 | Anne-Sophie Calvez | France | 18 | | | |
| 37 | Diana Y. Chen | Chinese Taipei | | 19 | | |
| 38 | Željka Krizmanić | Croatia | 19 | | | |
| 39 | Teodora Poštič | Slovenia | | 20 | | |
| 40 | Sonia Radeva | Bulgaria | 20 | | | |
| 41 | Kristiina Daub | Estonia | | 21 | | |
| 42 | Bianka Padar | Hungary | 21 | | | |
| 43 | Melissandre Fuentes | Andorra | 22 | | | |
| 44 | Maria Mastrogiannopoulou | Greece | | 22 | | |
| 45 | Rebeca Garcia | Spain | | 23 | | |
| 46 | Ksenia Jastsenjski | FR Yugoslavia | 23 | | | |
| 47 | Salur Duygu | Turkey | | 24 | | |
| 48 | Helena Garcia | Mexico | 24 | | | |

=== Pairs ===
| Rank | Name | Nation | SP | FS |
|---|---|---|---|---|
| 1 | Elena Riabchuk / Stanislav Zakharov | Russia | 2 | 1 |
| 2 | Julia Karbovskaya / Sergei Slavnov | Russia | 1 | 2 |
| 3 | Ding Yang / Ren Zhongfei | China | 3 | 3 |
| 4 | Maria Mukhortova / Pavel Lebedev | Russia | 5 | 4 |
| 5 | Carla Montgomery / Ryan Arnold | Canada | 4 | 5 |
| 6 | Tiffany Vise / Laureano Ibarra | United States | 6 | 7 |
| 7 | Tiffany Stiegler / Johnnie Stiegler | United States | 13 | 6 |
| 8 | Julia Beloglazova / Andrei Bekh | Ukraine | 9 | 8 |
| 9 | Johanna Purdy / Kevin Maguire | Canada | 8 | 9 |
| 10 | Tatiana Volosozhar / Petro Kharchenko | Ukraine | 7 | 11 |
| 11 | Veronika Havlíčková / Karel Štefl | Czech Republic | 11 | 10 |
| 12 | Colette Appel / Lee Harris | United States | 10 | 12 |
| 13 | Diana Rennik / Aleksei Saks | Estonia | 14 | 13 |
| 14 | Dominika Piątkowska / Alexandr Levintsov | Poland | 12 | 14 |

=== Ice dancing ===
| Rank | Name | Nation | C1 | C2 | SP | FS |
|---|---|---|---|---|---|---|
| 1 | Tanith Belbin / Benjamin Agosto | United States | 1 | 1 | 1 | 1 |
| 2 | Elena Khaliavina / Maxim Shabalin | Russia | 2 | 2 | 2 | 2 |
| 3 | Elena Romanovskaya / Alexander Grachev | Russia | 3 | 3 | 3 | 3 |
| 4 | Miriam Steinel / Vladimir Tsvetkov | Germany | 4 | 4 | 4 | 4 |
| 5 | Nóra Hoffmann / Attila Elek | Hungary | 6 | 5 | 6 | 5 |
| 6 | Nathalie Péchalat / Fabian Bourzat | France | 7 | 7 | 5 | 6 |
| 7 | Oksana Domnina / Maxim Bolotin | Russia | 5 | 6 | 7 | 7 |
| 8 | Anna Zadorozhniuk / Sergei Verbilo | Ukraine | 9 | 9 | 8 | 8 |
| 9 | Mariana Kozlova / Sergei Baranov | Ukraine | 8 | 8 | 9 | 9 |
| 10 | Alessia Aureli / Andrea Vaturi | Italy | 12 | 11 | 11 | 10 |
| 11 | Christina Beier / William Beier | Germany | 10 | 10 | 10 | 12 |
| 12 | Loren Galler-Rabinowitz / David Mitchell | United States | 13 | 12 | 12 | 11 |
| 13 | Myriam Trividic / Yann Abback | France | 11 | 14 | 14 | 13 |
| 14 | Mylène Girard / Brian Innes | Canada | 14 | 13 | 13 | 14 |
| 15 | Agata Rosłońska / Michał Tomaszewski | Poland | 15 | 15 | 15 | 15 |
| 16 | Lauren Flynn / Leif Gislason | Canada | 20 | 17 | 16 | 16 |
| 17 | Tatiana Siniaver / Tornike Tukvadze | Georgia | 18 | 19 | 19 | 17 |
| 18 | Julia Grigorenko / Alexander Shakalov | Ukraine | 17 | 18 | 18 | 18 |
| 19 | Alexandra Zaretski / Roman Zaretski | Israel | 19 | 20 | 17 | 19 |
| 20 | Lucie Kadlcakova / Hynek Bilek | Czech Republic | 16 | 16 | 20 | 20 |
| 21 | Marina Timofeieva / Evgeni Striganov | Estonia | 22 | 22 | 21 | 22 |
| 22 | Candice Towler-Green / James Phillipson | United Kingdom | 25 | 23 | 23 | 21 |
| 23 | Petra Pachlova / Petr Knoth | Czech Republic | 21 | 21 | 22 | 23 |
| 24 | Daniela Keller / Fabian Keller | Switzerland | 24 | 24 | 24 | 24 |
Free Dance Not Reached
| 25 | Petra Nemethi / Daniel Gal | Hungary | 23 | 25 | 26 | |
| 26 | Julia Klochko / Ramil Sarkulov | Uzbekistan | 26 | 26 | 25 | |
| 27 | Kim Hye-min / Kim Min-woo | South Korea | 27 | 27 | 27 | |
