= 2003 World Junior Figure Skating Championships =

- Type: ISU Championship
- Date: February 24 – March 2
- Season: 2002–03
- Location: Ostrava, Czech Republic
- Venue: Palace of Culture and Sports

Champions
- Men's singles: (Russia) Alexander Shubin
- Ladies' singles: (Japan) Yukina Ota
- Pairs: (China) Zhang Dan / Zhang Hao
- Ice dance: (Russia) Oksana Domnina / Maxim Shabalin
- Previous: 2002 World Junior Championships
- Next: 2004 World Junior Championships

The 2003 World Junior Figure Skating Championships were held from February 24 to March 2 at the Palace of Culture and Sports in Ostrava, Czech Republic. Medals were awarded in men's singles, ladies' singles, pair skating, and ice dancing.

Due to the large number of participants, the men's and ladies' qualifying groups were split into groups A and B. The ice dancing qualifying event was split into two groups as well, with both groups doing the same dances in the same order. Group B skated their first and second dances one after the other, then Group A skated their first and second, in the same order. The first compulsory dance was the Westminster Waltz, and the second was the Blues.

== Medals table ==
Rank	Nation	Gold	Silver	Bronze	Total
1	Russia (RUS)	2	0	1	3
2	China (CHN)	1	1	0	2
2	Japan (JPN)	1	1	0	2
4	United States (USA)	0	1	1	2
5	Hungary (HUN)	0	1	0	1
6	France (FRA)	0	0	1	1
6	Italy (ITA)	0	0	1	1
Totals (7 entries)		4	4	4	12

== Results ==
=== Men ===
Rank	Name	Nation	Fact. Places	QB	QA	SP	FS
1	Alexander Shubin	Russia	3.2		1	3	1
2	Evan Lysacek	United States	3.4		2	1	2
3	Alban Préaubert	France	6.6		3	4	3
4	Kazumi Kishimoto	Japan	8.0	1		6	4
5	Sergei Dobrin	Russia	8.8	4		2	6
6	Shawn Sawyer	Canada	10.6	2		8	5
7	Anton Kovalevski	Ukraine	12.6		4	5	8
8	Wu Jialiang	China	14.4		5	9	7
9	Daniel D'inca	Italy	17.0		7	7	10
10	Damien Djordjevic	France	18.0		6	11	9
11	Martin Liebers	Germany	20.2	3		10	13
12	Ryo Shibata	Japan	21.2	5		12	12
13	Ken Rose	Canada	21.6	7		13	11
14	Yannick Ponsero	France	27.2	6		18	14
15	Mikko Minkkinen	Finland	28.8	12		15	15
16	Sergei Shiliaev	Belarus	29.0		9	14	17
17	Tomáš Janečko	Czech Republic	31.6	9		20	16
18	Yi Rui	China	31.6	10		16	18
19	Adrian Schultheiss	Sweden	34.4		13	17	19
20	Andrei Dobrokhodov	Azerbaijan	36.2		12	19	20
21	Lee Dong-whun	South Korea	39.2	8		25	21
22	Hirokazu Kobayashi	Japan	39.8		8	21	24
23	Przemysław Domański	Poland	41.4		14	23	22
24	Ivan Kinčík	Slovakia	41.8	14		22	23
Free Skating Not Reached
25	Damjan Ostojič	Slovenia		15		24	
26	Sergei Kotov	Israel		11		27	
27	Ma Yingdi	China			10	28	
28	Luka Čadež	Slovenia			14	26	
29	Matthew Wilkinson	United Kingdom			11	30	
30	Juan Legaz	Spain		13		29	
Short Program Not Reached
31	Michael Chrolenko	Norway		16			
31	Bertalan Zakany	Hungary			16		
33	Adrian Matei	Romania			17		
33	Alper Uçar	Turkey		17			
35	Dmitri Antoni	Estonia			18		
35	Sean Carlow	Australia		18			
37	Edward Ka-yin Chow	Hong Kong		19			
37	Tomas Katukevicius	Lithuania			19		
39	Konrad Giering	South Africa			20		
39	Jamal Othman	Switzerland		20			
41	Marc Casal	Andorra		21			
41	Tristan Thode	New Zealand			21		
43	Peter Lee	Chinese Taipei			22		
43	Miguel Angel Moyron	Mexico		22			
45	Gegham Vardanyan	Armenia			23		
WD	Parker Pennington	United States					

=== Ladies ===
Rank	Name	Nation	Fact. Places	QB	QA	SP	FS
1	Yukina Ota	Japan	2.6	1		2	1
2	Miki Ando	Japan	5.0		3	3	2
3	Carolina Kostner	Italy	6.0		1	1	5
4	Mai Asada	Japan	8.0		2	7	3
5	Ye Bin Mok	United States	9.8	2		5	6
6	Beatrisa Liang	United States	11.2	3		10	4
7	Xu Binshu	China	13.6		5	6	8
8	Lina Johansson	Sweden	14.0		4	9	7
9	Kristina Oblasova	Russia	14.4	5		4	10
10	Louann Donovan	United States	18.0		6	11	9
11	Jenna McCorkell	United Kingdom	21.8		10	8	13
12	Viktória Pavuk	Hungary	22.0	8		13	11
13	Meghan Duhamel	Canada	23.6		11	12	12
14	Candice Didier	France	27.8	7		15	16
15	Olga Naidenova	Russia	28.6		8	19	14
16	Signe Ronka	Canada	28.6	4		20	15
17	Amanda Billings	Canada	30.0	6		16	18
18	Choi Ji-eun	South Korea	30.6		13	14	17
19	Kiira Korpi	Finland	33.0		7	17	20
20	Giorgia Carrossa	Italy	35.8	10		18	21
21	Sara Falotico	Belgium	36.0	11		21	19
22	Evgenia Melnik	Belarus	40.8		14	22	22
23	Iryna Lukianenko	Ukraine	41.6	9		25	23
24	Gintarė Vostrecovaitė	Lithuania	42.6		12	23	24
25	Veronika Benesova	Czech Republic	48.2		16	28	25
Free Skating Not Reached
26	Katharina Häcker	Germany			9	27	
27	Anja Bratec	Slovenia		14		24	
28	Simona Ocelkova	Slovakia			15	26	
29	Viviane Käser	Switzerland		12		29	
30	Laura Fernandez	Spain		13		31	
31	Joelle Bastiaans	Netherlands		15		30	
Short Program Not Reached
32	Jennifer LeGuilloux	Austria		16			
32	Fleur Maxwell	Luxembourg		16			
34	Jenna-Anne Buys	South Africa			17		
35	Željka Krizmanić	Croatia		18			
35	Magdalena Leska	Poland			18		
37	Ana Cecilia Cantu	Mexico			19		
37	Jekaterina Frolova	Estonia		19			
39	Simona Punga	Romania		20			
39	Sonia Radeva	Bulgaria			20		
41	Emilia Ahsan	Australia		21			
41	Milessandre Fuentes	Andorra			21		
43	Beril Bektas	Turkey			22		
43	Elena Kovalova	Latvia		22			
45	Maria Mastrogiannopoulou	Greece		23			
45	Keren Shua Haim	Israel			23		
47	Alix-Myra Anderson	Australia			24		
47	Nina Bates	Bosnia and Herzegovina		24			
WD	Kristel Popovic	Serbia and Montenegro					

=== Pairs ===
Rank	Name	Nation	Fact. Places	SP	FS
1	Zhang Dan / Zhang Hao	China	1.5	1	1
2	Ding Yang / Ren Zongfei	China	3.5	3	2
3	Jennifer Don / Jonathon Hunt	United States	5.5	5	3
4	Maria Mukhortova / Pavel Lebedev	Russia	6.0	4	4
5	Julia Karbovskaya / Sergei Slavnov	Russia	6.0	2	5
6	Carla Montgomery / Ryan Arnold	Canada	10.0	8	6
7	Tatiana Volosozhar / Petro Kharchenko	Ukraine	10.0	6	7
8	Kristen Roth / Michael McPherson	United States	11.5	7	8
9	Jessica Dubé / Samuel Tetrault	Canada	15.0	12	9
10	Brittany Vise / Nicolas Kole	United States	15.5	11	10
11	Veronika Havlíčková / Karel Štefl	Czech Republic	16.0	10	11
12	Julia Beloglazova / Andrei Bekh	Ukraine	16.5	9	12
13	Rebecca Handke / Daniel Wende	Germany	20.0	14	13
14	Marylin Pla / Yannick Bonheur	France	20.5	13	14
15	Diana Rennik / Aleksei Saks	Estonia	22.5	15	15
16	Rumiana Spassova / Staminir Todorov	Bulgaria	24.0	16	16
17	Joanna Dusik / Patryk Szałaśny	Poland	25.5	17	17
18	Ludmila Vesiolaia / Alexei Vesioli	Latvia	27.0	18	18
WD	Tatiana Kokareva / Egor Golovkin	Russia			

=== Ice dancing ===
Rank	Name	Nation	Fact. Places	CD1 - QB	CD2 - QB	CD1 - QA	CD1 - QB	OD	FD
1	Oksana Domnina / Maxim Shabalin	Russia	2.0	1	1			1	1
2	Nóra Hoffmann / Attila Elek	Hungary	4.0	2	2			2	2
3	Elena Romanovskaya / Alexander Grachev	Russia	5.6			2	2	3	3
4	Loren Galler-Rabinowitz / David Mitchell	United States	6.8			1	1	4	4
5	Christina Beier / William Beier	Germany	10.2	3	3			5	6
6	Natalia Mikhailova / Arkadi Sergeev	Russia	10.4			4	5	6	5
7	Mariana Kozlova / Sergei Baranov	Ukraine	13.0	4	5			7	7
8	Alexandra Zaretsky / Roman Zaretsky	Israel	15.2	5	4			9	8
9	Alessia Aureli / Andrea Vaturi	Italy	16.0			3	3	8	10
10	Melissa Piperno / Liam Dougherty	Canada	17.2			7	4	10	9
11	Morgan Matthews / Maxim Zavozin	United States	20.0	6	6			11	11
12	Kirsten Frisch / Brent Bommentre	United States	21.6			6	6	12	12
13	Petra Pachlova / Petr Knoth	Czech Republic	23.2			5	7	13	13
14	Myriam Trividic / Gregory Soler	France	25.2	7	7			14	14
15	Anna Zadorozhniuk / Sergei Verbillo	Ukraine	27.4			8	9	15	15
16	Barbara Herzog / Dmitri Matsjuk	Austria	29.6			9	11	16	16
17	Marina Timofeieva / Evgeni Striganov	Estonia	30.8			10	8	17	17
18	Yu Xiaoyang / Wang Chen	China	32.6	8	11			18	18
19	Candice Towler-Green / James Phillipson	United Kingdom	34.6	9	9			20	19
20	Anna Cappellini / Matteo Zanni	Italy	36.0			11	12	19	20
21	Daniela Keller / Fabian Keller	Switzerland	37.4	11	8			21	21
22	Floriane Rokia / Damien Biancotto	France	41.2			12	10	23	23
23	Zsuzsanna Nagy / György Elek	Hungary	41.2	10	10			22	24
24	Judith Haunstetter / Arne Hoenlein	Germany	41.6			13	13	24	22
Free Dance Not Reached
25	Anna Galcheniuk / Alexander Cherniaev	Belarus		12	12			25	
26	Paulina Urban / Marcin Trębacki	Poland		13	13			26	
27	Kim Hye-min / Kim Min-woo	South Korea				14	14	27	
28	Tiffany Jones / Daniel O'Hanlon	South Africa		14	14			28	
