= ISU Junior Grand Prix in the Netherlands =

International figure skating competition

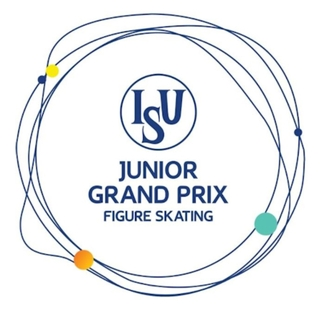
- Status: Inactive
- Genre: ISU Junior Grand Prix
- Frequency: Occasional
- Location: The Hague
- Country: Netherlands
- Inaugurated: 1999
- Most recent: 2006
- Organizer: Dutch Ice Skating Association

The ISU Junior Grand Prix in the Netherlands is an international figure skating competition sanctioned by the International Skating Union (ISU), organized and hosted by the Dutch Ice Skating Association (Dutch: Koninklijke Nederlandsche Schaatsenrijders Bond). It is held periodically as an event of the ISU Junior Grand Prix of Figure Skating (JGP), a series of international competitions exclusively for junior-level skaters. Medals may be awarded in men's singles, women's singles, pair skating, and ice dance. Skaters earn points based on their results at the qualifying competitions each season, and the top skaters or teams in each discipline are invited to then compete at the Junior Grand Prix of Figure Skating Final.

== History ==
The ISU Junior Grand Prix of Figure Skating (JGP) was established by the International Skating Union (ISU) in 1997 and consists of a series of seven international figure skating competitions exclusively for junior-level skaters. The locations of the Junior Grand Prix events change every year. While all seven competitions feature the men's, women's, and ice dance events, only four competitions each season feature the pairs event. Skaters earn points based on their results each season, and the top skaters or teams in each discipline are then invited to compete at the Junior Grand Prix of Figure Skating Final.

Skaters are eligible to compete on the junior-level circuit if they are at least 13 years old before 1 July of the respective season, but not yet 19 (for single skaters), 21 (for men and women in ice dance and women in pair skating), or 23 (for men in pair skating). Competitors are chosen by their respective skating federations. The number of entries allotted to each ISU member nation in each discipline is determined by their results at the prior World Junior Figure Skating Championships.

The Netherlands hosted its first Junior Grand Prix competition in 1999 in The Hague. Fedor Andreev of Canada won the men's event, Kristina Oblasova of Russia won the women's event, Amanda Magarian and Jered Guzman of the United States won the pairs event, and Natalia Romaniuta and Daniil Barantsev of Russia won the ice dance event.

The Netherlands hosted the 2002 Junior Grand Prix of Figure Skating Final – the culminating event of the Junior Grand Prix series – in The Hague. Alexander Shubin of Russia won the men's event, Yukina Ota of Japan won the women's event, Ding Yang and Ren Zhongfei of China won the pairs event, and Oksana Domnina and Maxim Shabalin of Russia won the ice dance event.

The Netherlands hosted two subsequent Junior Grand Prix events in The Hague in 2001 and 2006. The 2006 event was the competition's most recent iteration.

== Medalists ==
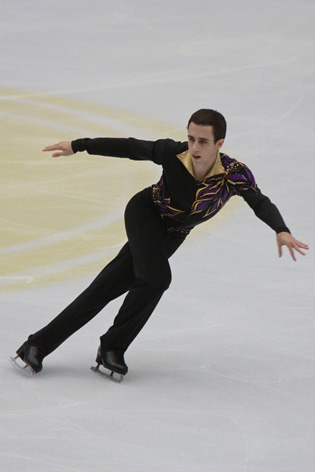
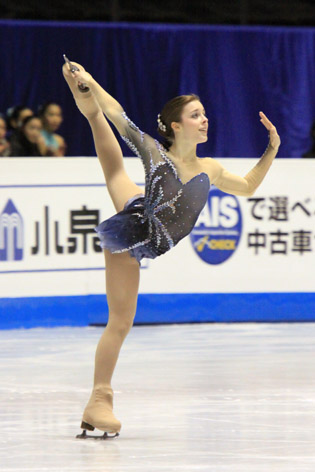
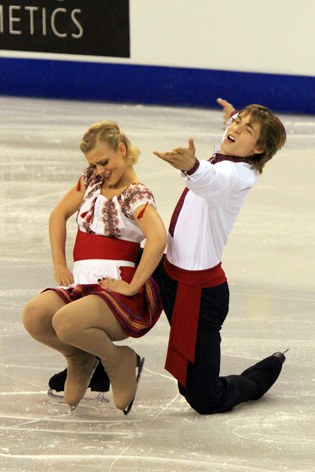
The 2006 Junior Grand Prix in the Netherlands champions (all from the United States): Stephen Carriere (men's singles); Ashley Wagner (women's singles); and Madison Hubbell and Keiffer Hubbell (ice dance)

=== Men's singles ===
Men's event medalists
Year	Location	Gold	Silver	Bronze	Ref.
1999	The Hague	(Canada) Fedor Andreev	(United Kingdom) Alan Street	(France) Cyril Brun	
2001	The Hague	(Belgium) Kevin van der Perren	(Switzerland) Jamal Othman	(Canada) Nicholas Young	
2002 Final	The Hague	(Russia) Alexander Shubin	(Russia) Sergei Dobrin	(United States) Parker Pennington	
2006	The Hague	(United States) Stephen Carriere	(Russia) Artem Borodulin	(United States) Eliot Halverson	

=== Women's singles ===
Women's event medalists
Year	Location	Gold	Silver	Bronze	Ref.
1999	The Hague	(Russia) Kristina Oblasova	(United States) Sara Wheat	(Germany) Susanne Stadlmüller	
2001	The Hague	(Canada) Cynthia Phaneuf	(Russia) Irina Nikolaeva	(Russia) Liudmila Nelidina	
2002 Final	The Hague	(Japan) Yukina Ota	(Italy) Carolina Kostner	(Japan) Miki Ando	
2006	The Hague	(United States) Ashley Wagner	(United States) Megan Oster	(Japan) Rumi Suizu	

=== Pairs ===
Pairs event medalists
Year	Location	Gold	Silver	Bronze	Ref.
1999	The Hague	(United States); Amanda Magarian; Jered Guzman	(Estonia); Viktoria Šklover; Valdis Mintals	(Russia); Meliza Brozovich; Anton Nimenkov	
2001	The Hague	(Canada); Carla Montgomery; Ryan Arnold	(Russia); Julia Shapiro; Dmitri Khromin	(Canada); Jessica Dubé; Samuel Tétrault	
2002 Final	The Hague	(China); Ding Yang; Ren Zhongfei	(Canada); Jessica Dubé; Samuel Tétrault	(United States); Jennifer Don; Jonathon Hunt	
2003	The Hague	No pairs competition			

=== Ice dance ===
Ice dance event medalists
Year	Location	Gold	Silver	Bronze	Ref.
1999	The Hague	(Russia); Natalia Romaniuta; Daniel Barantsev	(United States); Emilie Nussear; Brandon Forsyth	(Ukraine); Olga Kudym; Anton Tereshchenko	
2001	The Hague	(Russia); Elena Romanovskaya; Alexander Grachev	(Ukraine); Julia Golovina; Oleg Voiko	(Germany); Miriam Steinel; Vladimir Tsvetkov	
2002 Final	The Hague	(Russia); Oksana Domnina; Maxim Shabalin	(Hungary); Nóra Hoffmann; Attila Elek	(Russia); Elena Romanovskaya; Alexander Grachev	
2006	The Hague	(United States); Madison Hubbell; Keiffer Hubbell	(Estonia); Grethe Grünberg; Kristian Rand	(Russia); Ksenia Antonova; Roman Mylnikov	
