= 2004 Skate America =

- Type: Grand Prix
- Date: October 21 – 24
- Season: 2004–05
- Location: Pittsburgh, Pennsylvania
- Host: U.S. Figure Skating
- Venue: Mellon Arena

Champions
- Men's singles: (France) Brian Joubert
- Ladies' singles: (United States) Angela Nikodinov
- Pairs: (China) Zhang Dan / Zhang Hao
- Ice dance: (United States) Tanith Belbin / Benjamin Agosto
- Previous: 2003 Skate America
- Next: 2005 Skate America
- Next Grand Prix: 2004 Skate Canada International

The 2004 Skate America was the first event of six in the 2004–05 ISU Grand Prix of Figure Skating, a senior-level international invitational competition series. It was held at the Mellon Arena in Pittsburgh, Pennsylvania on October 21–24. Medals were awarded in the disciplines of men's singles, ladies' singles, pair skating, and ice dancing. Skaters earned points toward qualifying for the 2004–05 Grand Prix Final. The compulsory dance was the Golden Waltz.

== Results ==
=== Men ===
Rank	Name	Nation	Total points	SP		FS	
1	Brian Joubert	France	193.46	1	72.10	2	121.36
2	Ryan Jahnke	United States	186.71	4	60.83	1	125.88
3	Michael Weiss	United States	179.56	2	64.82	3	114.74
4	Roman Serov	Israel	174.42	3	62.24	4	112.18
5	Evan Lysacek	United States	162.51	5	54.87	8	107.64
6	Song Lun	China	161.46	9	51.08	6	110.38
7	Nicholas Young	Canada	160.82	6	52.60	7	108.22
8	Ben Ferreira	Canada	157.41	7	51.33	9	106.08
9	Stefan Lindemann	Germany	156.73	11	44.99	5	111.74
10	Vakhtang Murvanidze	Georgia	143.10	8	51.22	11	91.88
11	Alexander Shubin	Russia	142.42	10	47.08	10	95.34

=== Ladies ===
Rank	Name	Nation	Total points	SP		FS	
1	Angela Nikodinov	United States	149.50	2	53.62	2	95.88
2	Cynthia Phaneuf	Canada	144.40	3	50.20	3	94.20
3	Miki Ando	Japan	142.64	1	53.64	6	89.00
4	Alissa Czisny	United States	141.36	3	50.20	4	91.16
5	Susanna Pöykiö	Finland	140.38	8	42.98	1	97.40
6	Elena Liashenko	Ukraine	135.80	6	45.68	5	90.12
7	Yukina Ota	Japan	130.70	5	47.42	7	83.28
8	Miriam Manzano	Australia	125.30	7	44.06	8	81.24
9	Idora Hegel	Croatia	116.98	10	39.64	9	77.34
10	Anne-Sophie Calvez	France	102.88	9	39.88	10	63.00
11	Zhang Fan	China	85.52	11	30.84	11	54.68

=== Pairs ===
There was an accident during the free skating. Maxim Marinin lost his balance while attempting a difficult lasso lift and his partner Tatiana Totmianina slammed to the ice head first, sustaining a concussion, but was not seriously hurt. A short while later, Julia Obertas fell out of a lasso lift but her partner Sergei Slavnov managed to catch her to prevent her head hitting the ice.

Rank	Name	Nation	Total points	SP		FS	
1	Zhang Dan / Zhang Hao	China	166.86	3	56.98	1	109.88
2	Julia Obertas / Sergei Slavnov	Russia	166.26	2	57.58	2	108.68
3	Rena Inoue / John Baldwin, Jr.	United States	158.10	4	56.52	3	101.58
4	Ding Yang / Ren Zhongfei	China	139.42	6	47.98	5	91.44
5	Elizabeth Putnam / Sean Wirtz	Canada	136.88	7	45.38	4	91.50
6	Kathryn Orscher / Garrett Lucash	United States	129.32	8	43.76	6	85.56
7	Jennifer Don / Jonathon Hunt	United States	125.28	5	51.00	7	74.28
8	Julia Shapiro / Vadim Akolzin	Israel	100.74	9	41.36	8	59.38
WD	Tatiana Totmianina / Maxim Marinin	Russia		1	64.98		

=== Ice dancing ===
Rank	Name	Nation	Total points	CD		OD		FD	
1	Tanith Belbin / Benjamin Agosto	United States	212.87	1	43.71	1	63.40	1	105.76
2	Galit Chait / Sergei Sakhnovski	Israel	204.32	2	40.98	2	60.48	2	102.86
3	Megan Wing / Aaron Lowe	Canada	178.60	3	36.65	3	51.66	3	90.29
4	Svetlana Kulikova / Vitali Novikov	Russia	173.43	4	33.89	4	50.65	4	88.89
5	Sinead Kerr / John Kerr	United Kingdom	156.56	5	31.89	5	43.14	5	81.53
6	Julia Golovina / Oleg Voiko	Ukraine	143.92	7	27.08	6	42.81	7	74.03
7	Eve Bentley / Cédric Pernet	France	140.22	8	26.39	8	39.04	6	74.79
8	Kendra Goodwin / Brent Bommentre	United States	136.08	9	25.72	7	40.62	10	69.74
9	Loren Galler-Rabinowitz / David Mitchell	United States	133.45	10	24.35	9	38.96	9	70.14
10	Alexandra Kauc / Michał Zych	Poland	131.25	6	27.40	10	35.79	11	68.06
11	Elena Romanovskaya / Alexander Grachev	Russia	131.06	11	23.83	11	34.94	8	72.29
