= 2002–03 ISU Junior Grand Prix =

- Type: ISU Junior Grand Prix
- Season: 2002–03
- Previous: 2001–02 ISU Junior Grand Prix
- Next: 2003–04 ISU Junior Grand Prix

The 2002–03 ISU Junior Grand Prix was the sixth season of the ISU Junior Grand Prix, a series of international junior level competitions organized by the International Skating Union. It was the junior-level complement to the Grand Prix of Figure Skating, which was for senior-level skaters. Skaters competed in the disciplines of men's singles, ladies' singles, pair skating, and ice dance. The top skaters from the series met at the Junior Grand Prix Final.

== Competitions ==
The locations of the JGP events change yearly. In the 2002–03 season, the series was composed of the following events:

Date	Event	Location
August 21–25	2002 JGP Courchevel	Courchevel, France
September 12–15	2002 JGP Belgrade Sparrow	Belgrade, Yugoslavia
September 19–22	2002 JGP Scottsdale	Scottsdale, United States
September 26–29	2002 JGP Montreal	Montreal, Canada
October 3–6	2002 JGP Skate Slovakia	Bratislava, Slovakia
October 10–13	2002 JGP Pokal der Blauen Schwerter	Chemnitz, Germany
October 16–20	2002 JGP China	Beijing, China
Oct. 31 – Nov. 3	2002 JGP Trofeo Rita Trapanese	Milan, Italy
December 12–15	2002–03 Junior Grand Prix Final	The Hague, Netherlands

== Series notes ==
At the Junior Grand Prix Final, bronze medalist Miki Ando became the first lady to land a quadruple jump in competition when she landed a quadruple salchow.

== Junior Grand Prix Final qualifiers ==
The following skaters qualified for the 2002–03 Junior Grand Prix Final, in order of qualification.

	Men	Ladies	Pairs	Ice dance
1	(Russia) Sergei Dobrin	(Japan) Yukina Ota	(Russia) Julia Karbovskaya / Sergei Slavnov	(Hungary) Nóra Hoffmann / Attila Elek
2	(Russia) Alexander Shubin	(Japan) Miki Ando	(China) Ding Yang / Ren Zongfei	(Russia) Oksana Domnina / Maxim Shabalin
3	(Russia) Andrei Griazev	(United States) Alissa Czisny	(Russia) Maria Mukhortova / Pavel Lebedev	(Russia) Elena Romanovskaya / Alexander Grachev
4	(United States) Evan Lysacek	(Canada) Adriana DeSanctis	(Canada) Jessica Dubé / Samuel Tetrault	(Germany) Christina Beier / William Beier
5	(United States) Parker Pennington	(United States) Beatrisa Liang	(United States) Jennifer Don / Jonathon Hunt	(Italy) Alessia Aureli / Andrea Vaturi
6	(Russia) Mikhail Magerovski	(Italy) Carolina Kostner	(Canada) Carla Montgomery / Ryan Arnold	(Ukraine) Mariana Kozlova / Sergei Baranov
7	(Switzerland) Jamal Othman	(Sweden) Lina Johansson	(United States) Tiffany Stiegler / Johnnie Stiegler	(Russia) Natalia Mikhailova / Arkadi Sergeev
8	(Czech Republic) Tomáš Verner	(Canada) Signe Ronka	(Russia) Anastasia Kuzmina / Stanislav Evdokimov	(Russia) Ekaterina Rubleva / Ivan Shefer
Alternates
1st	(United States) Jordan Brauninger	(Japan) Akiko Suzuki	(United States) Tiffany Vise / Laureano Ibarra	(Israel) Alexandra Zaretski / Roman Zaretski
2nd	(Canada) Shawn Sawyer	(Russia) Olga Naidenova	(Russia) Elena Riabchuk / Stanislav Zakharov	(Canada) Melissa Piperno / Liam Dougherty
3rd	(United States) Wesley Campbell	(United States) Ye Bin Mok	(United States) Brittany Vise / Nicholas Kole	(United States) Loren Galler-Rabinowitz / David Mitchell

Joelle Bastiaans was given the host wildcard spot to the Junior Grand Prix Final.

== Medalists ==
=== Men ===
Competition	Gold	Silver	Bronze	Details
France	(Russia) Alexander Shubin	(United States) Evan Lysacek	(United States) Jordan Brauninger	
Yugoslavia	(Canada) Shawn Sawyer	(United States) Wesley Campbell	(North Korea) Song Choi Ri	
United States	(Russia) Andrei Griazev	(United States) Parker Pennington	(Canada) Ken Rose	
Canada	(Russia) Andrei Griazev	(United States) Evan Lysacek	(Switzerland) Jamal Othman	
Slovakia	(Russia) Alexander Shubin	(Japan) Nobunari Oda	(France) Yannick Ponsero	
Germany	(Russia) Sergei Dobrin	(Czech Republic) Tomáš Verner	(United States) Nicholas LaRoche	
China	(Russia) Mikhail Magerovski	(China) Rui Yi	(China) Wu Jialiang	
Italy	(Russia) Sergei Dobrin	(United States) Parker Pennington	(Switzerland) Jamal Othman	
Final	(Russia) Alexander Shubin	(Russia) Sergei Dobrin	(United States) Parker Pennington	

=== Ladies ===
Competition	Gold	Silver	Bronze	Details
France	(Italy) Carolina Kostner	(United States) Alissa Czisny	(Canada) Signe Ronka	
Yugoslavia	(Japan) Yukina Ota	(Canada) Adriana DeSanctis	(Russia) Alima Gershkovic	
United States	(Japan) Akiko Suzuki	(United States) Beatrisa Liang	(United States) Felicia Beck	
Canada	(Japan) Miki Ando	(United States) Louann Donovan	(Canada) Cynthia Phaneuf	
Slovakia	(Sweden) Lina Johansson	(United States) Alissa Czisny	(United States) Natalie Mecher	
Germany	(Russia) Olga Naidenova	(Canada) Adriana DeSanctis	(United Kingdom) Jenna McCorkell	
China	(Japan) Miki Ando	(United States) Beatrisa Liang	(United States) Ye Bin Mok	
Italy	(Japan) Yukina Ota	(Canada) Signe Ronka	(Hungary) Viktória Pavuk	
Final	(Japan) Yukina Ota	(Italy) Carolina Kostner	(Japan) Miki Ando	

=== Pairs ===
Competition	Gold	Silver	Bronze	Details
France	(Canada) Carla Montgomery / Ryan Arnold	(Russia) Elena Riabchuk / Stanislav Zakharov	(Russia) Anastasia Kuzmina / Stanislav Evdokimov	
Yugoslavia	(Russia) Maria Mukhortova / Pavel Lebedev	(Russia) Anastasia Kuzmina / Stanislav Evdokimov	(United States) Amy Howerton / Steven Pottenger	
United States	(China) Ding Yang / Ren Zhongfei	(United States) Jennifer Don / Jonathon Hunt	(United States) Brittany Vise / Nicholas Kole	
Canada	(China) Ding Yang / Ren Zhongfei	(United States) Tiffany Stiegler / Johnnie Stiegler	(Canada) Jessica Dubé / Samuel Tetrault	
Slovakia	(Russia) Julia Karbovskaya / Sergei Slavnov	(Canada) Chantal Poirier / Jesse Sturdy	(United States) Tiffany Vise / Laureano Ibarra	
Germany	(Canada) Jessica Dubé / Samuel Tetrault	(Russia) Maria Mukhortova / Pavel Lebedev	(United States) Tiffany Stiegler / Johnnie Stiegler	
China	(China) Zhang Dan / Zhang Hao	(United States) Tiffany Vise / Laureano Ibarra	(Russia) Tatiana Kokoreva / Egor Golovkin	
Italy	(Russia) Julia Karbovskaya / Sergei Slavnov	(United States) Jennifer Don / Jonathon Hunt	(Czech Republic) Veronika Havlíčková / Karel Štefl	
Final	(China) Ding Yang / Ren Zhongfei	(Canada) Jessica Dubé / Samuel Tetrault	(United States) Jennifer Don / Jonathon Hunt	

=== Ice dance ===
Competition	Gold	Silver	Bronze	Details
France	(Russia) Oksana Domnina / Maxim Shabalin	(Germany) Christina Beier / William Beier	(Canada) Melissa Piperno / Liam Dougherty	
Yugoslavia	(Russia) Oksana Domnina / Maxim Shabalin	(Ukraine) Mariana Kozlova / Sergei Baranov	(Israel) Alexandra Zaretsky / Roman Zaretsky	
United States	(Hungary) Nóra Hoffmann / Attila Elek	(Russia) Olga Orlova / Maxim Bolotin	(United States) Loren Galler-Rabinowitz / David Mitchell	
Canada	(Russia) Natalia Mikhailova / Arkadi Sergeev	(Italy) Alessia Aureli / Andrea Vaturi	(United States) Morgan Matthews / Maxim Zavozin	
Slovakia	(Russia) Elena Romanovskaya / Alexander Grachev	(Ukraine) Anna Zadorozhniuk / Sergei Verbillo	(Canada) Siobhan Karam / Joshua McGrath	
Germany	(Hungary) Nóra Hoffmann / Attila Elek	(Ukraine) Mariana Kozlova / Sergei Baranov	(Israel) Alexandra Zaretsky / Roman Zaretsky	
China	(Germany) Christina Beier / William Beier	(Russia) Ekaterina Rubleva / Ivan Shefer	(United States) Loren Galler-Rabinowitz / David Mitchell	
Italy	(Italy) Alessia Aureli / Andrea Vaturi	(Russia) Elena Romanovskaya / Alexander Grachev	(Canada) Melissa Piperno / Liam Dougherty	
Final	(Russia) Oksana Domnina / Maxim Shabalin	(Hungary) Nóra Hoffmann / Attila Elek	(Russia) Elena Romanovskaya / Alexander Grachev	

== Medals table ==
Rank	Nation	Gold	Silver	Bronze	Total
1	Russia (RUS)	17	7	4	28
2	Japan (JPN)	6	1	1	8
3	China (CHN)	4	1	1	6
4	Canada (CAN)	3	3	7	13
5	Italy (ITA)	2	2	0	4
6	Hungary (HUN)	2	1	1	4
7	Germany (GER)	1	1	0	2
8	Sweden (SWE)	1	0	0	1
9	United States (USA)	0	16	14	30
10	Ukraine (UKR)	0	3	0	3
11	Czech Republic (CZE)	0	1	1	2
12	Israel (ISR)	0	0	2	2
12	Switzerland (SUI)	0	0	2	2
14	France (FRA)	0	0	1	1
14	Great Britain (GBR)	0	0	1	1
14	North Korea (PRK)	0	0	1	1
Totals (16 entries)		36	36	36	108
