= Stanislav Zakharov =

Russian pair skater

Stanislav Zakarov
Personal information
- Full name: Stanislav Vladimirovich Zakharov
- Born: 31 August 1981 (age 44) Odintsovo, Russian SFSR, Soviet Union
- Height: 1.77 m (5 ft 9 1/2 in)

Figure skating career
- Country: Russia
- Skating club: CSKA Moscow
- Began skating: 1986
- Retired: 2004
Medal record
Representing Russia
Figure skating: Pairs
World Junior Championships
Gold medal – first place	2002 Hamar	Pairs

Stanislav Vladimirovich Zakharov (Russian: Станислав Владимирович Захаров; born 31 August 1981) is a Russian former pair skater. He is the 2002 World Junior champion with partner Elena Riabchuk. In the summer of 2000, his blade struck Riabchuk during a side-by-side spin, putting her in hospital for a couple of weeks.

== Personal life ==
His daughter Maria Zakharova is a figure skater as well.

== Results ==
=== With Riabchuk ===
Results
International
Event	1999–00	2000–01	2001–02	2002–03
Junior Worlds	6th	8th	1st	
JGP Czech Republic	4th			
JGP France				2nd
JGP Italy				6th
National
Russian Champ.			6th	
Russian Jr. Champ.	1st	2nd	1st	
JGP = Junior Grand Prix

=== With Potanina ===
Results
National
Event	2004
Russian Championships	7th

== Programs ==
(with Riabchuk)

Season	Short program	Free skating
2002–2003	The Truman Show by Burkhard Dallwitz	1492: Conquest of Paradise by Vangelis
2001–2002	The Road to El Dorado	1492: Conquest of Paradise by Vangelis
2000–2001	The Addams Family by Marc Shaiman The Caroling Company	Music by Jean-Michel Jarre; Love Story by Francis Lai; Barcelona performed by Richard Clayderman
