= Elena Riabchuk =

Russian figure skater (born 1985)

Personal information
- Born: 27 July 1985 (age 41) Kiev, Ukrainian SSR, Soviet Union
- Height: 1.52 m (5 ft 0 in)

Figure skating career
- Country: Russia
- Skating club: CSKA Moscow
- Began skating: 1990
- Retired: 2003
Medal record
Representing Russia
Figure skating: Pairs
World Junior Championships
Gold medal – first place	2002 Hamar	Pairs

Elena Riabchuk (Russian: Елена Рябчук; born 27 July 1985) is a former pair skater who competed for Russia. She is the 2002 World Junior champion with partner Stanislav Zakharov. She was hospitalized for a couple of weeks in the summer of 2000 after her partner's blade struck her head while practicing a side-by-side spin.

== Results ==
(with Zakharov)

Results
International
Event	1999–00	2000–01	2001–02	2002–03
Junior Worlds	6th	8th	1st	
JGP Czech Republic	4th			
JGP France				2nd
JGP Italy				6th
National
Russian Champ.			6th	
Russian Jr. Champ.	1st	2nd	1st	
JGP = Junior Grand Prix

== Programs ==
(with Zakharov)

Season	Short program	Free skating
2002–2003	The Truman Show by Burkhard Dallwitz	1492: Conquest of Paradise by Vangelis
2001–2002	The Road to El Dorado	1492: Conquest of Paradise by Vangelis
2000–2001	The Addams Family by Marc Shaiman The Caroling Company	Music by Jean-Michel Jarre; Love Story by Francis Lai; Barcelona performed by Richard Clayderman
