= Signe Ronka =

Latvian-Canadian figure skater

Personal information
- Born: April 23, 1988 (age 38) Riga, Latvia
- Height: 1.67 m (5 ft 5 1/2 in)

Figure skating career
- Country: Canada
- Skating club: Granite Club
- Began skating: 1997
- Retired: 2006

Signe Ronka (born April 23, 1988) is a Latvian Canadian former competitive figure skater. She won three medals on the ISU Junior Grand Prix series and competed at the 2003 World Junior Championships.

== Personal life ==
Ronka was born on April 23, 1988, in Riga, Latvia. She arrived in Toronto, Ontario, Canada at the age of three.

== Career ==
Ronka trained at the Granite Club in Toronto with coaches Ellen Burka and Marcus Christensen. In the 2001–02 season, she debuted on the ISU Junior Grand Prix series. She won the junior bronze medal at the 2002 Canadian Championships and the junior gold medal at the 2002 Triglav Trophy.

In the 2002–03 season, Ronka won a pair of medals at her JGP assignments — bronze in Courchevel and silver in Milan. Her results qualified her for the JGP Final in The Hague, Netherlands, where she finished seventh. She withdrew from the 2003 Canadian Championships due to a groin injury, having resumed full training in mid-January. She placed 16th at the 2003 World Junior Championships in Ostrava, Czech Republic.

In 2004, Ronka won bronze at a JGP event in Belgrade. She ended her career with a 10th place finish at the 2006 Canadian Championships and then retired from elite competition. She went on to skate for the University of Toronto varsity team, placing 1st at the 2007 and 2008 OUA Finals. In 2008, she received the Competitive Athlete of the Year award from the University of Toronto. Injuries ultimately ended Ronka's competitive career.

Ronka skated for two seasons (2007 to 2008) at the Canada's Wonderland "Endless Summer" ice show. She has worked as a coach and choreographer at the East York Skating Club, the Granite Club in Toronto, Ontario, and the Richmond Training Centre in Richmond Hill, Ontario.

She has developed a sport specific fitness program called Figure Skater Bootcamp, which helps skaters prevent injuries and improve performance on the ice. She is a certified strength and conditioning specialist through the National Strength and Conditioning Association and is a certified personal trainer.

== Movies ==
- Emma Flanders in the Disney movie Ice Princess.
- Mary-Kate Olsen's soccer double in the movie Switching Goals.
- Herself in documentary series Heartbeats by Breakthrough Films & Television Inc. (2005).

== Awards ==
- "Own the Podium 2010" Funding Award (2006)
- Petro-Canada Olympic Torch Scholarship (2002–03, 2003–04)
- Granite Club Gold Crest Award (2003, 2004, 2005, 2006) and Outstanding Volunteer Award (2006)
- Bank of Montreal "Possibilities" Award (2002)
- Toller Cranston Bursary Award (2000, 2001, 2002)
- Elvis Stojko Bursary
- Underhill/Martini "Hopes & Dreams"
- University of Toronto Athlete of the Year (2007)
- 2002 Junior Female Athlete of the Year Finalist, 30th Annual Canadian Sport Awards

== Programs ==
Season	Short program	Free skating
2002–2003	Hungarian Dances No. 4 - 6 by Johannes Brahms, performed by the Vienna Philharmonic Orchestra	Giselle by Adolphe Adam, performed by the Vienna Philharmonic Orchestra
2004–2005	Libertango by Astor Piazzolla	Violin Concerto in E Minor Op. 64 by Felix Mendelssohn

== Competitive results ==
JGP: Junior Grand Prix

International
Event	01–02	02–03	03–04	04–05	05–06
World Junior Champ.		16th			
JGP Final		7th			
JGP Bulgaria					9th
JGP Croatia			6th		
JGP France		3rd			
JGP Italy	7th	2nd			
JGP Romania				7th	
JGP Serbia				3rd	
Triglav Trophy	1st J				
National
Canadian Champ.	3rd J	WD	11th	WD	10th
WD = Withdrew; Levels: V = Juvenile; P = Pre-novice; J = Junior
