= Giorgia Carrossa =

Italian former competitive figure skater

Personal information
- Born: 31 July 1986 (age 39) Bolzano, Italy
- Height: 1.66 m (5 ft 5 1/2 in)

Figure skating career
- Country: Italy
- Skating club: Ice Club Bolzano
- Began skating: 1990
- Retired: 2005

Medal record
Italian Championships
Bronze medal – third place	2003 Lecco	Singles

Giorgia Carrossa (born 31 July 1986) is an Italian former competitive figure skater. She is the 2004 Triglav Trophy silver medalist and 2003 Italian national bronze medalist. She reached the free skate at two ISU Championships – the 2003 World Junior Championships in Ostrava and the 2004 World Junior Championships in The Hague.

After retiring from competition, Carrossa performed in ice shows (Holiday on Ice) before turning to coaching, in 2010. She works at the WSV Brixen ASV (BRESSANONE), Italy. She is a technical specialist in singles and pairs.

== Programs ==
Season	Short program	Free skating
2003–2004	Concerto by Pyotr Ilyich Tchaikovsky	Life by Yanni
2002–2003	The Go Between by Michel Legrand	Marching Season by Yanni
2001–2002	Swan Lake by Pyotr Ilyich Tchaikovsky	La Strada by Nino Rota

== Competitive highlights ==
JGP: Junior Grand Prix

International
Event	99–00	00–01	01–02	02–03	03–04	04–05
Golden Spin					13th	
Triglav Trophy					2nd	
International: Junior
Junior Worlds				20th	19th	
JGP Bulgaria			11th			
JGP Croatia					13th	
JGP France						18th
JGP Italy				13th		
JGP Mexico					5th	
JGP Poland			6th			
JGP Slovakia				8th		
JGP Ukraine						11th
EYOF				8th		
Gardena				6th J.		
National
Italian Champ.	4th J.	3rd J.	1st J.	3rd	4th	4th
J. = Junior level
