= Maxim Shabalin =

Russian former competitive ice dancer (born 1982)

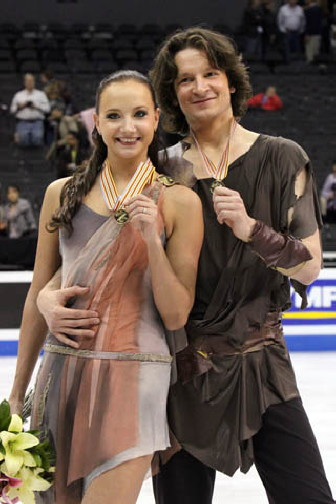
- Domnina and Shabalin at the 2009 Worlds

Personal information
- Full name: Maxim Andreyevich Shabalin
- Born: 25 January 1982 (age 44) Kuybyshev, Russian SFSR, Soviet Union
- Height: 1.83 m (6 ft 0 in)

Figure skating career
- Country: Russia
- Partner: Oksana Domnina
- Skating club: Odintsovo Ice Skating School
- Began skating: 1987
- Retired: 2010
Medal record
Figure skating: Ice dancing
Representing Russia (with Domnina)
Winter Olympics
Bronze medal – third place	2010 Vancouver	Ice dancing
World Championships
Gold medal – first place	2009 Los Angeles	Ice dancing
European Championships
Gold medal – first place	2010 Tallinn	Ice dancing
Gold medal – first place	2008 Zagreb	Ice dancing
Silver medal – second place	2007 Warsaw	Ice dancing
Grand Prix Final
Silver medal – second place	2008–09 Goyang	Ice dancing
Gold medal – first place	2007–08 Turin	Ice dancing
Bronze medal – third place	2006–07 St. Petersburg	Ice dancing
Russian Championships
Gold medal – first place	2005 Saint Petersburg	Ice Dancing
Gold medal – first place	2007 Mytishchi	Ice Dancing
Gold medal – first place	2010 Saint Petersburg	Ice Dancing
Silver medal – second place	2004 Saint Petersburg	Ice Dancing
Silver medal – second place	2006 Kazan	Ice Dancing
Bronze medal – third place	2003 Kazan	Ice Dancing
World Junior Championships
Gold medal – first place	2003 Ostrava	Ice dancing
Junior Grand Prix Final
Gold medal – first place	2002–03 The Hague	Ice dancing
Representing Russia (with Khalyavina)
World Junior Championships
Silver medal – second place	2002 Hamar	Ice dancing
Bronze medal – third place	2001 Sofia	Ice dancing
Junior Grand Prix Final
Gold medal – first place	2001–02 Bled	Ice dancing
Silver medal – second place	2000–01 Ayr	Ice dancing

Maxim Andreyevich Shabalin (Russian: Максим Андреевич Шабалин; born 25 January 1982) is a Russian former competitive ice dancer. He and partner Oksana Domnina are the 2010 Olympic bronze medalists, the 2009 World Champions, the 2008 & 2010 European Champions, the 2007 Grand Prix Final champions, and three-time (2005, 2007, 2010) Russian national champions.

== Career ==
=== Early career ===
Shabalin began skating aged four in Samara – although pushed into the sport by his parents, he grew to enjoy it by the age of 11. He began competing in ice dancing aged 11 or 12. At the age of 15, he moved to Bulgaria to skate with Margarita Toteva for that country but the partnership ended due to her injury. He then competed with Elena Khalyavina for Russia.

=== Partnership with Domnina ===
Shabalin was paired with Oksana Domnina in May 2002 by coach Alexei Gorshkov. In their first season together, they won every junior level competition they entered, including the 2002–03 Junior Grand Prix Final and the 2003 World Junior Championships.

Shabalin sustained a meniscus injury in spring 2007 and had surgery on his right knee in May. They initially worked on a free dance to Schindler's List but when they wanted to add a faster section they thought it looked too much like a hodgepodge; after consultation with Tatiana Tarasova, they began working on a new free dance to Masquerade Waltz at the start of August. In September 2007, Shabalin also had surgery due to appendicitis. He then had problems with his left knee and had another operation in December. He returned to win the 2008 Europeans but limped off the ice. The pain persisted despite therapy, preventing them from training fully and resulting in their withdrawal from the 2008 World Championships. Shabalin spent five weeks in treatment in Munich, Germany, while Domnina trained on her own in Odintsovo, near Moscow.

In June 2008, Domnina/Shabalin announced they were leaving their longtime coach Alexei Gorshkov and moving from Russia to the United States to train with husband-and-wife coaches Natalia Linichuk and Gennadi Karponosov at the IceWorks Skating Complex in Aston, Pennsylvania. The move was considered surprising as their rivals Tanith Belbin / Benjamin Agosto had also moved to the same coaches a couple months prior, but Domnina said the competition at the rink was stimulating.

Domnina/Shabalin won the silver medal at the 2008-09 Grand Prix Final, and then took gold at 2009 Worlds. Afterwards, Shabalin returned to Germany for another four months of therapy on his left knee. They missed the 2009–10 Grand Prix series as a result of his knee problems. They resumed training in November 2009. Shabalin decided to use a brace in practice and competition to limit the movement and protect his knee.

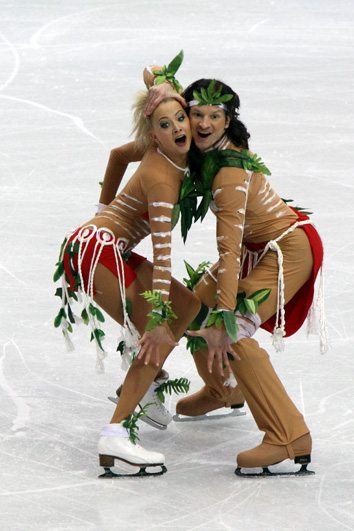
Domnina/Shabalin perform their controversial original dance at the 2010 Olympics.

Their original dance based on Australian Aboriginal folk dances sparked controversy in early 2010. Australian Aboriginal leaders were offended by the dance. Domnina/Shabalin said they meant no disrespect and would do the dance at the Olympics. When it was first skated at the 2010 Russian Championships, they wore face makeup but removed it for the 2010 European Championships. Domnina/Shabalin won the bronze medal at the 2010 Olympics and withdrew from the World Championships as a result of continued problems with his knee. He was diagnosed with osteoarthritis. Shabalin received the Overcoming Award at the 2010 Crystal Ice Awards held in October 2010 in Moscow. He was also appointed head coach of the Russian national ice dancing team.

=== Television ===
He appeared in the eighth season of ice show contest Ice Age.

== Personal life ==
Shabalin was born on 25 January 1982 in Samara, Russia. He studied civil administration. He married Russian actress Irina Grineva in November 2010. Their daughter, Vasilisa, was born on 6 July 2013 in Marbella, Spain.

== Programs ==
=== With Domnina ===
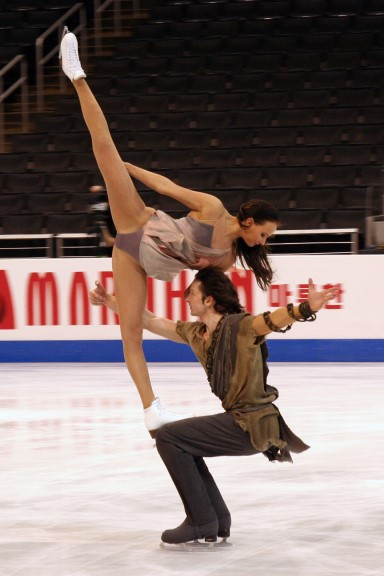
Domnina/Shabalin perform their Spartacus free dance at the 2009 Worlds.

Season	Original dance	Free dance	Exhibition
2009–2010	Aboriginal dance arrangement by Alexander Goldstein	The Double Life of Veronique by Zbigniew Preisner; Requiem for a Dream by Clint Mansell; The Double Life of Veronique by Zbigniew Preisner	The Matrix by Don Davis
2008–2009	Lyric Waltz by Dmitri Shostakovich; Waltz No. 2 by Dmitri Shostakovich performed by André Rieu choreo. by Natalia Linichuk	Spartacus by Aram Khachaturian choreo. by Vanda Lubkovskaya	Gonna Fly Now by Bill Conti
2007–2008	Cossack dance: Guys, Unsaddle Your Horses (Розпрягайте, хлопці, коні)	Masquerade Waltz by Aram Khachaturian	Tango Oblivion by Astor Piazzolla
2006–2007	Primavera Portena; Invierno Porteño by Astor Piazzolla	Polovtsian Dances (from Prince Igor) by Alexander Borodin	Adagio by Secret Garden; Another Brick in the Wall by Pink Floyd; Proper Education by Eric Prydz
2005–2006	Paxi Ni Ngongo by Bonga; Chillando Goma by Fulanito	Waltz of the Spirits: Ein Wiener Waltzer (A Viennese Waltz); Hermit Of The Sea Rock; Ein Wiener Waltzer by Karl Jenkins	The Show Must Go On by Queen
2004–2005	I wait for you; It Don't Mean a Thing by Duke Ellington	Katana Groove by Tomoyasu Hotei; Il dolce suono (from Lucia di Lammermoor); The Diva Dance (from The Fifth Element) performed by Emma Shapplin; Kill The Target by Tomoyasu Hotei	Rap & Classica
2003–2004	Harlem Nocturne; The Dirty Boogie by The Brian Setzer Orchestra	Four Seasons Tango by Antonio Vivaldi, Astor Piazzolla	Brasileiro: Fanfarra; Malagenha by Sérgio Mendes
2002–2003	Polka/Waltz by Dmitri Shostakovich	Brasileiro: Fanfarra; Malagenha by Sérgio Mendes	Mungal

=== With Khalyavina ===
Season	Original dance	Free dance
2001–2002	Paso doble; Flamenco; Paso doble	Romeo and Juliet by Nino Rota
2000–2001	My Guy; Dancing Fool	Anytime, Anywhere performed by Sarah Brightman

== Competitive highlights ==
GP: Grand Prix; JGP: Junior Series/Junior Grand Prix

=== With Domnina for Russia ===
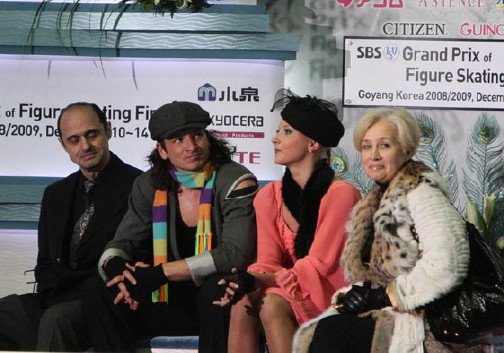
Domnina/Shabalin sit with coaches, Gennadi Karponosov and Natalia Linichuk, following their original dance at the 2008-09 Grand Prix Final.

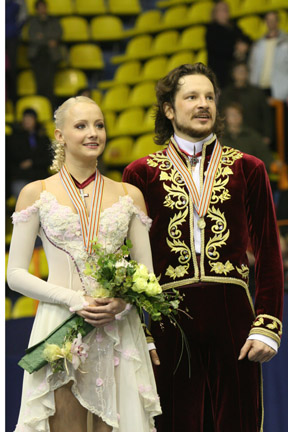
Domnina/Shabalin at the 2008 European Championships.

International
Event	02–03	03–04	04–05	05–06	06–07	07–08	08–09	09–10
Olympics				9th				3rd
Worlds	15th	10th	8th	7th	5th		1st	
Europeans	12th	7th	6th	6th	2nd	1st	WD	1st
GP Final				5th	3rd	1st	2nd	
GP Cup of China			4th		1st	2nd	1st	
GP Cup of Russia		6th	4th	3rd	2nd	1st	2nd	
GP Skate America				3rd				
GP Skate Canada		6th						
Finlandia Trophy		2nd						
Schäfer Memorial					1st			
Skate Israel				2nd				
International: Junior
Junior Worlds	1st							
JGP Final	1st							
JGP France	1st							
JGP Serbia	1st							
National
Russian Champ.	3rd	2nd	1st	2nd	1st			1st
Russian Jr. Champ.	1st							
WD: Withdrew

=== With Khalyavina for Russia ===
International
Event	1999–2000	2000–01	2001–02
World Junior Champ.	10th	3rd	2nd
JGP Final		2nd	1st
JGP Czech Republic		1st	
JGP Italy			1st
JGP Norway	3rd	1st	
JGP Poland			1st
JGP Slovenia	1st		
National
Russian Junior Champ.	3rd	2nd	1st

=== With Toteva for Bulgaria ===
International
Event	1997–98
World Junior Championships	14th
JGP Bulgaria	6th
JGP Slovakia	6th
National
Bulgarian Championships	2nd
