= Nicholas LaRoche =

American figure skater (born 1983)

Personal information
- Born: July 29, 1983 (age 43) Gardner, Massachusetts, U.S.

Figure skating career
- Country: United States
- Discipline: Men's singles
- Skating club: All Year FSC
- Began skating: 1992
- Retired: 2009

Nicholas LaRoche (born July 29, 1983) is an American figure skater. He is the 2002 United States National Jr. Men's Figure Skating Champion, Nebelhorn Trophy bronze medalist, 2007 Ondrej Nepela Memorial silver medalist, and placed tenth at the 2002 World Junior Championships.

== Career ==
LaRoche debuted on the ISU Junior Grand Prix series in 1999. He won the junior title at the 2002 U.S. Championships. He was assigned to the 2002 World Junior Championships where he placed tenth. Later that year, he won a bronze medal on the JGP series, in Germany.

From 2003, LaRoche competed on the senior level at the U.S. Championships. He won the bronze medal at the 2003 Nebelhorn Trophy and silver at the 2007 Ondrej Nepela Memorial. His last competition was the 2009 nationals. On April 13, 2009, he announced his retirement on his official site.

LaRoche coaches at the Toyota Training Center in El Segundo, California. He also runs the US Athletic Foundation, which he started with his sister Tricia, to assist athletes in all sports obtain funding.

== Personal life ==
LaRoche's private life has been marred by tragedy. In 2003, his older brother, David, died at the age of 23. On July 1, 2008, his father, William LaRoche, apparently bludgeoned to death Nicholas' mother, Bernadette, before killing himself.

== Programs ==
Season	Short program	Free skating
2007–2008	Fiesta Flamenca by Monty Kelly	Unchained Melody by Alex North (piano version)
2006–2007	Moonlight Sonata by Ludwig van Beethoven	Unchained Melody by Alex North; Unforgettable
2005–2006	Kodo Drums	Fiesta Flamenca by Monty Kelly
2004–2005	Time to Say Goodbye by Francesco Sartori	Music by Johannes Brahms; Music by Pyotr I. Tchaikovsky; Music by Sergei Rachmaninoff
2003–2004	Illumination by Rolf Løvland performed by Secret Garden	Dragonheart by Randy Edelman; Jurassic Park by John Williams
2002–2003	Another Cha Cha by Santa Esmeralda	JFK
2001–2002	Star Island	B-Tribe

== Competitive highlights ==
Results
Event	1999–00	2000–01	2001–02	2002–03	2003–04	2004–05	2005–06	2006–07	2007–08
Finlandia Trophy								5th	
Golden Spin					8th				
Nebelhorn Trophy					3rd				
Ondrej Nepela							4th		2nd
Junior Worlds			10th						
JGP Canada				5th					
JGP Germany				3rd					
JGP Netherlands	12th								
JGP Norway	5th								
U.S. Champ.	7th J.	7th J.	1st J.	8th	12th	8th	11th	11th	
