= Marc Casal =

Andorran figure skater

Personal information
- Born: August 13, 1987 (age 38)
- Height: 167 cm (5 ft 6 in)

Figure skating career
- Country: Andorra
- Coach: Andrei Efremov
- Skating club: Orient Club Sez, Canillo

Marc Casal (born August 13, 1987, in Canillo, Andorra) is an Andorran figure skater. He is the 2004 Andorran national champion and three time junior national champion. Along with Melissandre Fuentes, he was the first skater to represent Andorra in an ISU Championship, which they both achieved at the 2002 World Junior Figure Skating Championships.

== Competitive highlights ==
JGP: Junior Grand Prix

International
Event	00-01	01-02	02-03	03-04
Junior Worlds		39th	41st	39th
JGP Croatia				15th
JGP Mexico				21st
JGP U.S.			14th	
EYOF			18th J	
Triglav Trophy		6th J	19th J	
Trofeo Rita Trapanese		28th J		
International: Novice
DSU Cup	6th			
National
Andorran Champ.	1st J	1st J	1st J	1st
Levels: N = Novice, J = Junior; WD = Withdrew
