= Ksenia Antonova =

Russian ice dancer

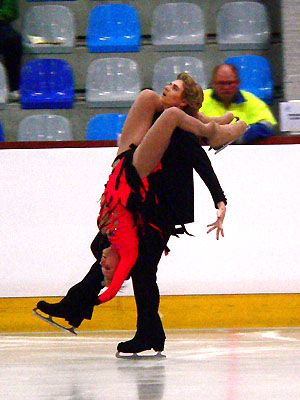
- Antonova and Mylnikov in 2006.

Personal information
- Full name: Ksenia Olegovna Antonova
- Born: 21 August 1990 (age 35)

Figure skating career
- Country: Russia
- Retired: 2007

Ksenia Olegovna Antonova (Russian: Ксения Олеговна Антонова, born 21 August 1990) is a Russian former ice dancer. With partner Roman Mylnikov, she won two bronze medals on the ISU Junior Grand Prix series.

In March 2007, Antonova teamed up with German ice dancer Paul Boll but the partnership did not last.

== Competitive highlights ==
(with Mylnikov)

Results
International
| Event | 2004–05 | 2005–06 | 2006–07 |
|---|---|---|---|
| JGP Andorra | | 3rd | |
| JGP China | 4th | | |
| JGP Chinese Taipei | | | 4th |
| JGP Netherlands | | | 3rd |
National
| Russian Junior Championships | | 5th | |
JGP = Junior Grand Prix
