= Roman Mylnikov =

Russian ice dancer

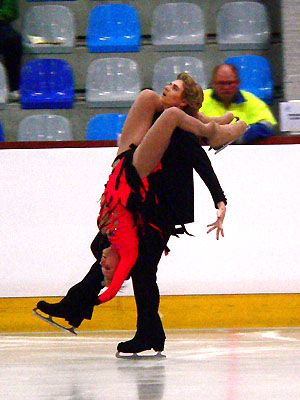
- Antonova and Mylnikov in 2006.

Personal information
- Full name: Roman Alexandrovich Mylnikov
- Born: 11 October 1986 (age 39)

Figure skating career
- Country: Russia
- Retired: 2007

Roman Alexandrovich Mylnikov (Russian: Роман Александрович Мыльников; born 11 October 1986) is a Russian former ice dancer. With Ksenia Antonova, he won two bronze medals on the ISU Junior Grand Prix series. Earlier, he competed with Antonina Sadokhina.

== Competitive highlights ==
=== With Antonova ===
Results
International
Event	2004–05	2005–06	2006–07
JGP Andorra		3rd	
JGP China	4th		
JGP Chinese Taipei			4th
JGP Netherlands			3rd
National
Russian Junior Championships		5th	
JGP = Junior Grand Prix

=== With Sadokhina ===
National
Event	2001–2002
Russian Junior Championships	11th
