= Doberman (album) =

Studio album by Tomoyasu Hotei
- Released: September 26, 2003
- Recorded: On Air Azabu Studio (Tokyo); Dada Studio (Tokyo)
- Genre: Rock
- Length: 49:23
- Label: EMI
- Producer: Tomoyasu Hotei

Tomoyasu Hotei chronology
| Scorpio Rising (2002) | Doberman (2003) | Electric Samurai (The Noble Savage) (2005) |

Doberman is a 2003 album by Tomoyasu Hotei. It peaked at number 9 on Oricon Albums Chart.

== Track listing ==
All music is composed by Tomoyasu Hotei.

| No. | Title | Lyrics | Length |
|---|---|---|---|
| 1. | "Doberman" | Tomoyasu Hotei | 5:18 |
| 2. | "弾丸ロック (Dangan Rock)" (Rock Like A Bullet) | Kō Machida | 4:04 |
| 3. | "Twisted Bon Voyage" | Tomoyasu Hotei | 4:57 |
| 4. | "やるだけやっちまえ! (Yarudake Yacchimae!)" | Tomoyasu Hotei | 5:00 |
| 5. | "Get High!!!" | Tomoyasu Hotei | 2:53 |
| 6. | "Nocturne No. 9" | Tomoyasu Hotei | 4:44 |
| 7. | "Evil Dance" | Mariko Koike | 5:15 |
| 8. | "デスペラード (Desperado)" | Tomoyasu Hotei | 5:37 |
| 9. | "グレイト・エスケイプ (Great Escape)" | Shuichi Yoshida | 4:13 |
| 10. | "New World" | Etsushi Toyokawa | 5:23 |
| 11. | "ハウリング (Howling)" | [Instrumental] | 5:34 |
