= Amanda Billings =

Canadian figure skater

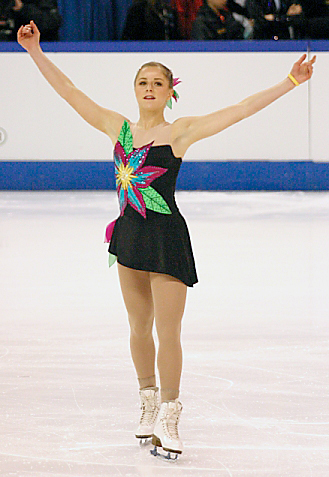
- Billings competes her long program at the 2005 World Junior Championships in Kitchener, Ontario.

Personal information
- Born: December 14, 1986 (age 39) Calgary, Alberta
- Height: 1.58 m (5 ft 2 in)

Figure skating career
- Country: Canada
- Coach: Sharon Lariviere, Scott Davis
- Skating club: Calatta FSC

Amanda Billings (born December 14, 1986) is a Canadian figure skater. She had been expected to contend for the 2006 Winter Olympics, but an injury on December 21, 2005, prevented her doing so.

She trained at the Calalta club in Calgary, with coaches Scott Davis and Sharon Lariviere. She is an alumna of Bishop Carroll High School, which is designed for students needing a flexible schedule, and includes a number of other top Canadian athletes.

In 2007, Billings took on the role of Gabriella in the east coast version of Disney's High School Musical: The Ice Tour.

== Competitive highlights ==
Event	2001–02	2002–03	2003–04	2004–05	2005–06	2006–07
World Junior Championships		17th		11th		
Canadian Championships	7th J.	2nd J.	9th	4th	24th	7th
Nebelhorn Trophy					7th	4th
Junior Grand Prix, Mexico			10th			
Junior Grand Prix, Germany		9th				
Junior Grand Prix, Italy		11th				
Junior Grand Prix, Sweden	7th					
Mladost Trophy		2nd				
J. = Junior level
