= Louann Donovan =

American figure skater

Personal information
- Born: September 26, 1986 (age 40) Boston, Massachusetts

Figure skating career
- Country: United States
- Began skating: 1992

Louann Donovan (born September 26, 1986) is an American former competitive figure skater. She is the 2004 Nebelhorn Trophy champion and competed in two World Junior Championships, placing as high as sixth.

== Career ==
Donovan initially played ice hockey. She began taking figure skating lessons after watching Nancy Kerrigan compete at the 1992 Olympics.

Donovan won the junior title at the 2002 U.S. Championships. She was assigned to the 2002 World Junior Championships and placed sixth. The following season, Donovan won a silver medal on the ISU Junior Grand Prix series and then debuted on the senior level at the U.S. Championships, placing ninth. She was sent to the 2003 World Junior Championships and finished tenth.

Donovan won gold in her senior international debut at the 2004 Nebelhorn Trophy. Doing a triple flip after the event, she broke the navicular bone of her right foot in half. As doctors initially believed it was a sprain, she attempted to compete at the 2004 Finlandia Trophy and injured her foot further.

As of 2007, Donovan works as a skating director at the Icenter in Salem, New Hampshire.

== Programs ==
Season	Short program	Free skating
2002–2003	The Given by Michael Smith	Capriccio Espanol by Nikolai Rimsky-Korsakov
2001–2002	Bolero by Maurice Ravel	Sleeping Beauty by Pyotr Tchaikovsky

== Results ==
International
Event	00–01	01–02	02–03	03–04	04–05
Nebelhorn Trophy					1st
International: Junior
Junior Worlds		6th	10th		
JGP Bulgaria		6th			
JGP Canada			2nd		
JGP Italy			7th		
JGP Slovakia				5th	
Triglav Trophy	2nd J				
National
U.S. Champ.	6th J	1st J	9th	16th	
JGP = Junior Grand Prix; WD = Withdrew; J = Junior
