= Melissandre Fuentes =

Andorran figure skater

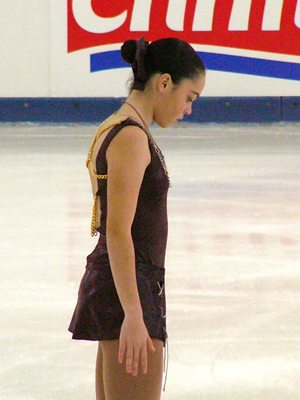
- Fuentes in 2004.

Personal information
- Born: March 1, 1988 (age 38)
- Height: 165 cm (5 ft 5 in)

Figure skating career
- Country: Andorra
- Coach: Mikel Garcia
- Skating club: Orient Club Gel, Canillo

Melissandre Fuentes (born March 1, 1988 in Canillo) is an Andorran figure skater. She is the 2004 and 2005 Andorran national champion. Her younger sister Lydia Fuentes competes internationally on the junior level.

Fuentes is the first lady skater to represent Andorra at an ISU Championship, which she accomplished at the 2002 World Junior Figure Skating Championships.

== Competitive highlights ==
JGP: Junior Grand Prix

International
Event	00-01	01-02	02-03	03-04	04-05	05-06	06-07	07-08
Europeans					34th		34th	
Coupe de Nice								12th
International: Junior
Junior Worlds		43rd	41st	36th			38th	
JGP Andorra						19th		
JGP Bulgaria		21st						
JGP France			14th					
JGP Germany					30th			
JGP Italy		27th						
JGP Mexico				15th				
JGP Poland				33rd				
JGP U.S.			16th					
EYOF			20th					
Golden Bear		4th						
Triglav Trophy		19th					10th	
National
Andorran Champ.	1st J	1st J		1st	1st		1st	1st
Levels: N = Novice, J = Junior; WD = Withdrew
