= Oksana Domnina =

Russian ice dancer (born 1984)

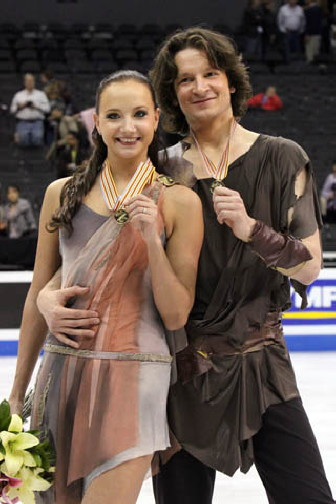
- Domnina and Shabalin at the 2009 Worlds

Personal information
- Full name: Oksana Alexandrovna Domnina
- Born: 17 August 1984 (age 42) Kirov, Russian SFSR, Soviet Union
- Height: 1.73 m (5 ft 8 in)

Figure skating career
- Country: Russia
- Partner: Maxim Shabalin
- Skating club: Odintsovo Ice Skating School
- Began skating: 1989
- Retired: 2010
Medal record
Figure skating: Ice dancing
Representing Russia
Winter Olympics
Bronze medal – third place	2010 Vancouver	Ice dancing
World Championships
Gold medal – first place	2009 Los Angeles	Ice dancing
European Championships
Gold medal – first place	2010 Tallinn	Ice dancing
Gold medal – first place	2008 Zagreb	Ice dancing
Silver medal – second place	2007 Warsaw	Ice dancing
Grand Prix Final
Silver medal – second place	2008–09 Goyang	Ice dancing
Gold medal – first place	2007–08 Turin	Ice dancing
Bronze medal – third place	2006–07 St. Petersburg	Ice dancing
Russian Championships
Gold medal – first place	2005 Saint Petersburg	Ice Dancing
Gold medal – first place	2007 Mytishchi	Ice Dancing
Gold medal – first place	2010 Saint Petersburg	Ice Dancing
Silver medal – second place	2004 Saint Petersburg	Ice Dancing
Silver medal – second place	2006 Kazan	Ice Dancing
Bronze medal – third place	2003 Kazan	Ice Dancing
World Junior Championships
Gold medal – first place	2003 Ostrava	Ice dancing
Junior Grand Prix Final
Gold medal – first place	2002–03 The Hague	Ice dancing

Oksana Alexandrovna Domnina (Russian: Оксана Александровна Домнина, born 17 August 1984) is a Russian former competitive ice dancer. She and partner Maxim Shabalin are the 2010 Olympic bronze medalists, the 2009 World Champions, the 2008 & 2010 European Champions, the 2007 Grand Prix Final champions, and three-time (2005, 2007, 2010) Russian national champions.

== Career ==
Domnina began skating at the age of six in Kirov and took up ice dancing two years later due to her height. Early in her career, she competed with Ivan Lobanov and Maxim Bolotin.

=== Partnership with Shabalin ===
Domnina was paired with Maxim Shabalin in May 2002 by coach Alexei Gorshkov. In their first season together, they won every junior level competition they entered, including the 2002–03 Junior Grand Prix Final and the 2003 World Junior Championships.

Shabalin sustained a meniscus injury in spring 2007 and had surgery on his right knee in May. They initially worked on a free dance to Schindler's List but when they wanted to add a faster section they thought it looked too much like a hodgepodge; after consultation with Tatiana Tarasova, they began working on a new free dance to Masquerade Waltz at the start of August. In September 2007, Shabalin also had surgery due to appendicitis. He then had problems with his left knee and had another operation in December. He returned to win the 2008 Europeans but limped off the ice. The pain persisted despite therapy, preventing them from training fully and resulting in their withdrawal from the 2008 World Championships. Shabalin spent five weeks in treatment in Munich, Germany, while Domnina trained on her own in Odintsovo, near Moscow.

In June 2008, Domnina/Shabalin announced they were leaving their longtime coach Alexei Gorshkov and moving from Russia to the United States to train with husband-and-wife coaches Natalia Linichuk and Gennadi Karponosov at the IceWorks Skating Complex in Aston, Pennsylvania. Domnina said they had been very comfortable in Odintsovo and it was a difficult decision to make. The move was considered surprising as their rivals Tanith Belbin / Benjamin Agosto had also moved to the same coaches a couple months prior, but Domnina said the competition at the rink was stimulating.

Domnina/Shabalin won the silver medal at the 2008–09 Grand Prix Final, and then took gold at 2009 Worlds. Afterwards, Shabalin returned to Germany for another four months of therapy on his left knee. They missed the 2009–10 Grand Prix series as a result of his knee problems. They resumed training in November 2009. Shabalin decided to use a brace in practice and competition to limit the movement and protect his knee.

=== Aboriginal folk dance controversy ===
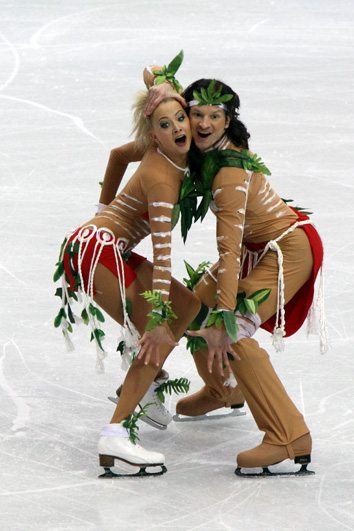
Domnina/Shabalin perform their controversial original dance at the 2010 Olympics.

Their original dance based on Australian Aboriginal folk dances sparked controversy in early 2010. Australian Aboriginal leaders were offended by the dance. Domnina and Shabalin said they meant no disrespect and would do the dance at the Olympics. When it was first skated at the 2010 Russian Championships, they wore face makeup but removed it for the 2010 European Championships. Domnina/Shabalin won the bronze medal at the 2010 Olympics and withdrew from the World Championships as a result of continued problems with his knee. They decided not to compete during the 2010–11 season to allow Shabalin to fully recover. In July 2010, Domnina announced on the team's official site that she was not ready to retire, despite the insistence of her mother and boyfriend to leave the sport, and that a decision would be made in 2011. She also denied rumors suggesting she would team up with Roman Kostomarov but added "Never say never."

== Personal life ==
Oksana Domnina was born on 17 August 1984 in Kirov, Kirov Oblast, Russian SFSR, Soviet Union. She studied psychology. In August 2010, it was reported that Domnina was engaged to Russian ice dancer Roman Kostomarov, the 2006 Olympic champion, and expecting their first child together. Their daughter, Anastasia, was born on 2 January 2011. They married in April 2014. Their son, Ilya, was born in January 2016.

== Programs ==
=== With Shabalin ===
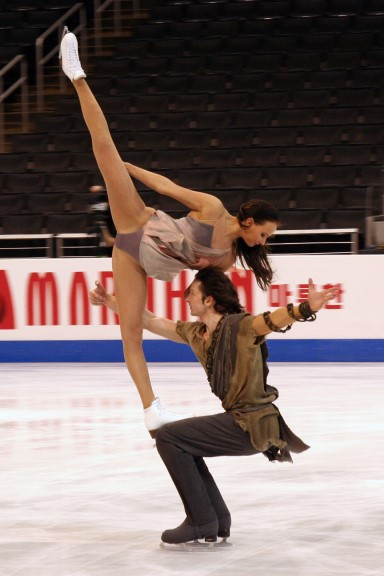
Domnina/Shabalin perform their Spartacus free dance at the 2009 Worlds.

Season	Original dance	Free dance	Exhibition
2009–2010	Aboriginal dance arrangement by Alexander Goldstein	The Double Life of Veronique by Zbigniew Preisner; Requiem for a Dream by Clint Mansell; The Double Life of Veronique by Zbigniew Preisner	The Matrix by Don Davis
2008–2009	Lyric Waltz by Dmitri Shostakovich; Waltz No. 2 by Dmitri Shostakovich performed by André Rieu choreo. by Natalia Linichuk	Spartacus by Aram Khachaturian choreo. by Vanda Lubkovskaya	Gonna Fly Now by Bill Conti
2007–2008	Cossack dance: Guys, Unsaddle Your Horses (Розпрягайте, хлопці, коні)	Masquerade Waltz by Aram Khachaturian	Tango Oblivion by Astor Piazzolla
2006–2007	Primavera Portena; Invierno Porteño by Astor Piazzolla	Polovtsian Dances (from Prince Igor) by Alexander Borodin	Adagio by Secret Garden; Another Brick in the Wall by Pink Floyd; Proper Education by Eric Prydz
2005–2006	Paxi Ni Ngongo by Bonga; Chillando Goma by Fulanito	Waltz of the Spirits: Ein Wiener Waltzer (A Viennese Waltz); Hermit Of The Sea Rock; Ein Wiener Waltzer by Karl Jenkins	The Show Must Go On by Queen
2004–2005	I wait for you; It Don't Mean a Thing by Duke Ellington	Katana Groove by Tomoyasu Hotei; Il dolce suono (from Lucia di Lammermoor); The Diva Dance (from The Fifth Element) performed by Emma Shapplin; Kill The Target by Tomoyasu Hotei	Rap & Classica
2003–2004	Harlem Nocturne; The Dirty Boogie by The Brian Setzer Orchestra	Four Seasons Tango by Antonio Vivaldi, Astor Piazzolla	Brasileiro: Fanfarra; Malagenha by Sérgio Mendes
2002–2003	Polka/Waltz by Dmitri Shostakovich	Brasileiro: Fanfarra; Malagenha by Sérgio Mendes	Mungal

=== With Bolotin ===
Season	Original dance	Free dance
2001–2002	Tango; Flamenco	Natasha Atlas; Kitaro; Natasha Atlas

== Competitive highlights ==
GP: Grand Prix; JGP: Junior Grand Prix

=== With Shabalin ===
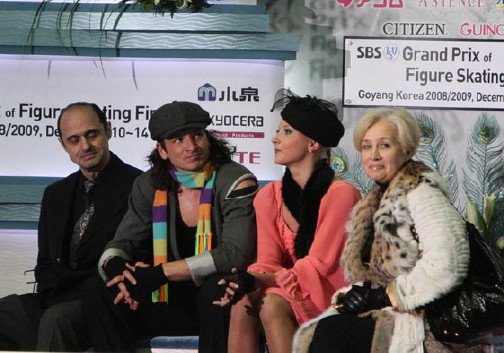
Domnina/Shabalin sit with coaches, Gennadi Karponosov and Natalia Linichuk, following their original dance at the 2008–09 Grand Prix Final.

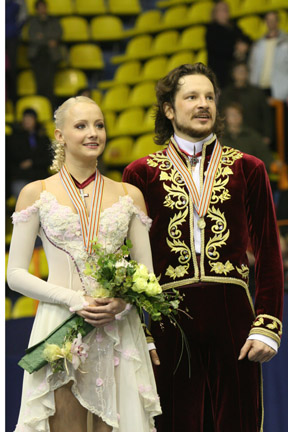
Domnina/Shabalin at the 2008 European Championships.

International
Event	02–03	03–04	04–05	05–06	06–07	07–08	08–09	09–10
Olympics				9th				3rd
Worlds	15th	10th	8th	7th	5th		1st	
Europeans	12th	7th	6th	6th	2nd	1st	WD	1st
GP Final				5th	3rd	1st	2nd	
GP Cup of China			4th		1st	2nd	1st	
GP Cup of Russia		6th	4th	3rd	2nd	1st	2nd	
GP Skate America				3rd				
GP Skate Canada		6th						
Finlandia Trophy		2nd						
Schäfer Memorial					1st			
Skate Israel				2nd				
International: Junior
Junior Worlds	1st							
JGP Final	1st							
JGP France	1st							
JGP Serbia	1st							
National
Russian Champ.	3rd	2nd	1st	2nd	1st			1st
Russian Jr. Champ.	1st							
WD: Withdrew

=== With Bolotin ===
International
Event	2000–01	2001–02
World Junior Champ.		7th
JGP Final	7th	4th
JGP Bulgaria		1st
JGP Czech Republic		2nd
JGP Poland	2nd	
JGP Ukraine	3rd	
National
Russian Jr. Champ.	3rd	3rd

=== With Lobanov ===
National
Event	1999–2000
Russian Championships	8th

== Television ==
She appeared in the 4-9 seasons of ice show contest Ice Age.
