= The Truman Show: Music from the Motion Picture =

- Poster, designed by Paramount Studios

Soundtrack album by Burkhard Dallwitz, Philip Glass and Wojciech Kilar
- Released: June 2, 1998
- Recorded: 1998 (tracks 1–5, 9–11, 13–17, and 20–21); 1991 (tracks 7, 12, and 18); 1988 (track 6); 1985 (track 19); 1961 (track 8)
- Genre: Soundtrack
- Length: 56:32
- Label: Milan Records

Professional ratings
Review scores
Source	Rating
Allmusic	4/5 stars

The Truman Show: Music from the Motion Picture is a soundtrack to the 1998 film of the same name and was composed by Burkhard Dallwitz. Dallwitz was hired after Peter Weir received a tape of his work while in Australia for the post-production. Some parts of the soundtrack were composed by Philip Glass, including four pieces which appeared in his previous works (Powaqqatsi, Anima Mundi and Mishima, the opening movement from the latter of which appears over the end credits in The Truman Show). Glass also appears very briefly in the film as one of the in-studio composer/performers. Glass and Dallwitz won a Golden Globe for Best Original Score.

Also featured are Frédéric Chopin's second movement (Romanze-Larghetto) from his first piano concerto, performed by the New Symphony Orchestra of London under the direction of Stanisław Skrowaczewski with pianist Arthur Rubinstein, Wolfgang Amadeus Mozart's Rondo alla turca from his Piano Sonata No. 11 in A Major, performed by Wilhelm Kempff; Wojciech Kilar's Father Kolbe's Preaching performed by the Warsaw National Philharmonic Orchestra; as well as the song 20th Century Boy performed by rockabilly band The Big Six.

== Track listing ==
The Truman Show: Music from the Motion Picture
No.	Title	Writer(s)	Length
1.	"Trutalk"	Dallwitz	1:18
2.	"It's A Life"	Dallwitz	1:29
3.	"Aquaphobia"	Dallwitz	0:40
4.	"Dreaming of Fiji"	Glass	1:54
5.	"Flashback"	Dallwitz	1:19
6.	"Anthem - Part 2"	Glass	3:50
7.	"The Beginning"	Glass	4:06
8.	"Romance-Larghetto" (Performed by Arthur Rubinstein)	Frédéric Chopin	10:42
9.	"Drive"	Dallwitz	3:34
10.	"Underground"	Dallwitz	0:56
11.	"Do Something!"	Dallwitz	0:44
12.	"Living Waters"	Glass	3:48
13.	"Reunion"	Dallwitz	2:26
14.	"Truman Sleeps"	Glass	1:51
15.	"Truman Sets Sail"	Dallwitz	1:55
16.	"Underground/Storm"	Dallwitz	3:37
17.	"Raising the Sail"	Glass	2:13
18.	"Father Kolbe's Preaching"	Wojciech Kilar	2:26
19.	"Opening"	Glass	2:14
20.	"A New Life"	Dallwitz	1:58
21.	"20th Century Boy" (Performed by The Big Six)	Marc Bolan	3:07
