= Alexander Shubin (figure skater) =

Russian former competitive figure skater (born 1983)

Personal information
- Full name: Alexander Alexandrovich Shubin
- Born: 14 July 1983 (age 43) Moscow, Russian SFSR, Soviet Union
- Height: 1.81 m (5 ft 11 in)

Figure skating career
- Country: Russia
- Skating club: Ice Palace Moskvich
- Began skating: 1988
- Retired: 2007
Medal record
Representing Russia
Figure skating: Men's singles
World Junior Championships
Gold medal – first place	2003 Ostrava	Men's singles
Junior Grand Prix Final
Gold medal – first place	2002–03 The Hague	Men's singles

Alexander Alexandrovich Shubin (Russian: Александр Александрович Шубин; born 14 July 1983) is a Russian former competitive figure skater. He is the 2003 World Junior champion and the 2002 JGP Final champion. He retired from competition in 2007. He works as a coach in Moscow.

== Programs ==
Season	Short program	Free skating
2004–2005	The Nutcracker by Pyotr Tchaikovsky arranged by Phillip Chernov	Killer Kid by Phillip Chernov
2003–2004	The Nutcracker by Pyotr Tchaikovsky	The West by A. Khairait and others
2002–2003	Cha, Cha; Blues	The Four Seasons by Antonio Vivaldi (modern version)
2000–2001	An American in Paris by George Gershwin	Cats (musical) by Andrew Lloyd Webber

== Competitive highlights ==
GP: Grand Prix; JGP: Junior Grand Prix

International
Event	98–99	99–00	00–01	01–02	02–03	03–04	04–05	05–06	06–07
GP Cup of Russia						WD			
GP Lalique						6th			
GP NHK Trophy							11th		
GP Skate America							11th		
Crystal Skate								2nd	
Skate Israel								3rd	
International: Junior
Junior Worlds			11th		1st				
JGP Final					1st				
JGP France					1st				
JGP Italy				2nd					
JGP Netherlands				6th					
JGP Slovakia					1st				
JGP Ukraine			5th						
National
Russian Champ.	11th	10th		14th	4th			11th	15th
Russian Junior			2nd	3rd	1st				
WD: Withdrew
