= Nóra Hoffmann =

Hungarian ice dancer (born 1985)

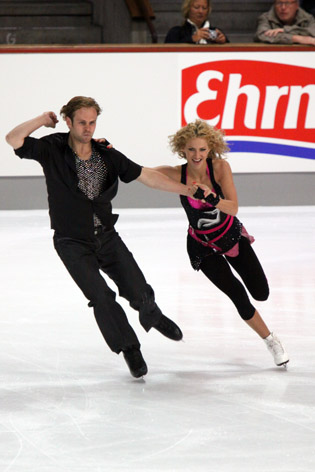
- Hoffmann and Zavozin in 2009.

Personal information
- Full name: Nóra Hoffmann
- Born: 8 April 1985 (age 41) Budapest, Hungarian People's Republic
- Height: 1.71 m (5 ft 7 in)

Figure skating career
- Country: Hungary
- Skating club: Piruett S.E. Budapest
- Began skating: 1991

Nóra Hoffmann (born 8 April 1985 in Budapest) is a Hungarian ice dancer. With Maxim Zavozin, she is the 2010 Cup of Russia silver medalist and a two-time (2009, 2010) Hungarian national champion. With Attila Elek, she is a two-time (2003–2004) World Junior silver medalist, the 2003 JGP Final champion, and a five-time (2003–2007) Hungarian national champion.

== Career ==
=== With Elek ===
Hoffmann trained in both ice dancing and single skating until age 11 when she broke her leg on a jump. She was paired with Attila Elek by coaches in the early 1990s. They twice won the silver medal at Junior Worlds, in 2003 and 2004. Hoffmann / Elek were silver medalists at the 2002–2003 Junior Grand Prix Final and won the title in 2003–2004. On the senior Grand Prix series, their best placement was 5th at 2006 Cup of Russia. Their best finish at senior Worlds was 15th in 2005. They competed at the 2006 Olympics, finishing 17th. During the warm-up at 2006 Worlds, another couple was performing a lift nearby and the woman's skates accidentally cut Hoffmann's back and elbow. Despite the pain, Hoffmann skated with Elek a few minutes later and they finished 18th.

At the 2007 European Championships, they were 7th after the original dance but they were forced to withdraw – Elek broke his leg during the morning practice before the free dance. They split up at the end of the season.

=== With Zavozin ===
Hoffman teamed up with Maxim Zavozin in September 2007. They had competed against each other at 2004 Junior Worlds, with Zavozin and his partner in third behind Hoffmann and Elek.

During the 2008–09 season, Hoffmann / Zavozin did not compete on the Grand Prix circuit but won the 2009 Hungarian national title and were given a berth to the 2009 European Championships. Despite Zavozin having a fever, they skated in the original dance at Europeans, but his condition worsened and they had to withdraw before the free dance. They missed the 2009 World Championships due to a serious head injury to Hoffmann while training in the U.S. on 4 March 2009. Hoffmann stumbled over an open gate and cracked her skull, losing consciousness and suffering three hemorrhages. She had a long stay in hospital and was given morphine for the pain but, hoping to compete at Worlds, she eventually decided to refuse it to avoid violating doping rules.

Even after one day I had withdrawal symptoms; I was cold, I vomited... And because of the bleeding I didn't hear on my left ear for three months. The skull was cracked exactly where the middle ear is so I also had problems with my balance. I had to learn to walk a straight line, I couldn't stand on one leg and my head was constantly spinning."
—Nóra Hoffmann on her accident

Zavozin stayed with her at the hospital until her boyfriend arrived to take her back to Hungary. Oxygen therapy helped reactivate her brain cells, "This therapy brought me back to a normal life. Until then I was just sleeping or staring at nothing. In the oxygen tent my vitality returned and not so much later I even dared to go back on the ice." She returned to the ice in the second half of May 2009 and eventually began training again with Zavozin, although they had to omit lifts and spins for a while. The accident also resulted in a torn nerve in the sciatic muscle which took half a year to heal.

During the 2009–10 season, Hoffmann / Zavozin missed the Grand Prix series. They competed at the 2010 European Championships where they placed 10th. They qualified for the 2010 Olympics where they finished 13th. At the 2010 World Championships, they finished in 10th.

In the 2010–11 season, Hoffmann / Zavozin made their first appearance together on the Grand Prix series. Their first event was 2010 Cup of China where they placed fourth. At 2010 Cup of Russia, they won silver, their first medal on the senior Grand Prix series. They finished third in both the short and free dance and set personal best scores in both. They competed at the 2011 European Championships where they finished 8th after receiving some low levels from the technical panel and a small stumble. On 30 March 2011, Hoffmann was hospitalized with an unknown illness in Moscow where she was training. Doctors later said they were fairly certain it was pyelonephritis. She and Zavozin had to withdraw from the 2011 World Championships. They did not compete in the 2011–2012 season but said in March 2012 that they were considering returning to competition.

== Programs ==
=== With Zavozin ===
Season	Short dance	Free dance
2010–2011	Waltz: The Sleeping Beauty by Pyotr Tchaikovsky; Waltz: Les Patineurs by Émile Waldteufel	Nagyidai Cigányok (Gypsy Witch) by Experidance
	Original dance	
2009–2010	Hungarian folk: Csardas	So Excited by Janet Jackson; Hush Hush by The Pussycat Dolls; Rock This Party
2008–2009	Blues: Minnie the Moocher; Lindy Hop	So Excited by Janet Jackson; Too Late to Apologize; Rock This Party

=== With Elek ===
Season	Original dance	Free dance
2006–2007	Tango	Swing, Brother Swing; Why don't you do Right? by Julie London; Swing, Brother Swing
2005–2006	Cha Cha; Rhumba; Samba	Flamenco medley
2004–2005	Slow foxtrot: Singing in the Rain; Quickstep: Music from "Ballroom Dancers"	Once Upon a Time in Mexico
2003–2004	Rock'n'roll: Great Balls of Fire; Blues: Big Legged Woman; Rock'n'roll: Great Balls of Fire	Dance with Me: Black Machine by Jazz Machine; You are my Everything by Ana Gabriel; Pantera en Libertad by Monica Navanjo
2002–2003	Quickstep; Slow foxtrot; Quickstep	Quidam (from Cirque du Soleil by René Dupéré
2001–2002	Tango: Sombras; Flamenco: Granada	Toccata and Fugue in D-Minor (modern version) by Johann Sebastian Bach
2000–2001	Waltz: My Sweet and Tender Beast by Eugen Doga; Polka: Tritsch-Tratsch-Polka, op. 214 by Johann Strauss II	Lovely Sunset by Claude Challe

== Results ==
=== With Zavozin ===
Results
International
Event	2008–2009	2009–2010	2010–2011
Olympics		13th	
Worlds		10th	WD
Europeans	WD	10th	8th
Grand Prix Final			6th
GP Cup of China			4th
GP Cup of Russia			2nd
Finlandia			2nd
Ice Challenge		1st	
Nebelhorn		7th	
Ondrej Nepela		1st	1st
Golden Spin		WD	
National
Hungarian	1st	1st	1st

=== With Elek ===
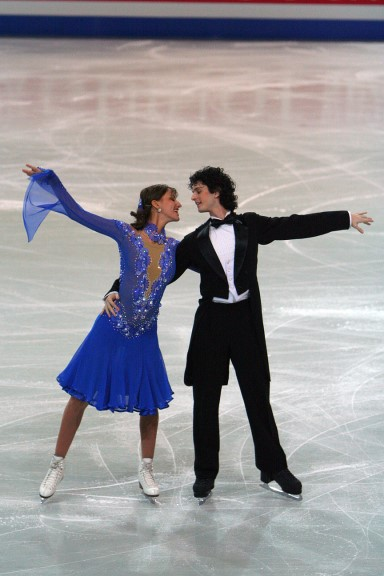
Hoffmann / Elek at the 2007 European Championships

Results
International
Event	1998–99	1999–00	2000–01	2001–02	2002–03	2003–04	2004–05	2005–06	2006–07
Olympics								17th	
Worlds					18th	18th	15th	18th	
Europeans					14th	11th	10th	12th	WD**
GP Bompard							7th		6th
GP Cup of China							6th		
GP Cup of Russia									5th
GP NHK Trophy								7th	
Bofrost Cup						5th			
Golden Spin						1st			
Karl Schäfer								8th	
International: Junior
Junior Worlds	21st	17th	9th	5th	2nd	2nd			
JGP Final				5th	2nd	1st			
JGP Bulgaria				3rd		1st			
JGP China	9th								
JGP Germany					1st				
JGP Italy				2nd					
JGP Japan		6th							
JGP Mexico	7th		3rd						
JGP Netherlands		8th							
JGP Norway			4th						
JGP Slovenia						1st			
JGP USA					1st				
National
Hungarian	2nd J.	1st J.	1st J.		1st	1st	1st	1st	1st
