= Loren Galler-Rabinowitz =

American ice dancer and beauty pageant titleholder

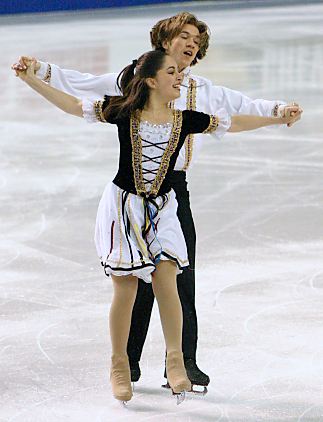

Personal information
- Born: January 19, 1986 (age 40) Boston, Massachusetts, U.S.
- Height: 5 ft 2 in (1.58 m)

Figure skating career
- Country: United States
- Skating club: SC Boston
- Began skating: 1988
- Retired: 2006

Loren Galler-Rabinowitz (born January 19, 1986) is a physician, an American former ice dancer, and pageant titleholder. She is the 2004 U.S. ice dancing bronze medalist with David Mitchell and competed in the Miss America 2011 pageant.

== Personal life ==
Loren Galler-Rabinowitz was born on January 19, 1986, in Boston, Massachusetts. The eldest child of Janina Galler, a psychiatrist and neurologist, and Burton Rabinowitz, a cardiologist, she has twin sisters, Arielle and Danielle. Her maternal grandparents, Eva and Henry Galler, were Polish Jews who survived the Holocaust and then lived in Sweden, where Janina was born, before moving to the United States.

Galler-Rabinowitz played the piano from the age of ten months and won the Massachusetts state piano competition in the junior high division. She graduated from The Park School and then from Buckingham Browne and Nichols School in Cambridge in 2004.

== Medical career ==
After graduating from Harvard University in 2010, she enrolled at the Columbia University College of Physicians and Surgeons, pursuing an MD degree. In 2015, Galler-Rabinowitz graduated from medical school an Alpha Omega Alpha member. In 2018, she completed an internal medicine residency at New York Presbyterian Columbia. In 2018, she began her fellowship in gastroenterology at Mount Sinai Hospital in New York.

In 2018, The New England Journal of Medicine published Dr. Rabinowitz's perspective piece, "Recognizing Blind Spots — A Remedy for Gender Bias in Medicine?" In 2020, she was the first author of an article, "Addressing gender in gastroenterology: opportunities for change" that appeared in Gastrointestinal Endoscopy.

== Ice dancing career ==
Galler-Rabinowitz began figure skating at the age of two and moved into ice dancing when she was nine. She competed with partner David Mitchell from age 11 to 20. They were coached by Barret Brown, Tom Lescinski, and Karen Cullinan in Boston from 1998 to May 2004.

Galler-Rabinowitz/Mitchell won the 1999 North American Novice Challenge Skate in Toronto, the 2000 U.S. Eastern Sectional Championships (Novice), the 2000 U.S. Championships (Novice), the 2002 Eastern Sectional Championships (Junior), and the 2002 U.S. Championships (Junior). They placed fourth overall at the 2003 World Junior Championships, winning their two compulsory dances. They won the pewter medal at the 2003 U.S. Championships (senior) and a bronze medal at the 2004 U.S. Championships, a total of four national medals in four years.

In May 2004, Galler-Rabinowitz/Mitchell decided to relocate to Stamford, Connecticut, to train under Natalia Dubova. In the 2004–05 season, they placed ninth at both of their Grand Prix events. In December 2004, Mitchell decide to undergo surgery to repair a grade two superior and anterior cartilage tear in the labrum of his left shoulder. As a result, the dance team missed the 2005 U.S. Championships and returned to competition the following season. They ended their partnership after placing ninth at the 2006 U.S. Championships.

In March 2011, the National Jewish Sports Hall of Fame awarded her the Marty Glickman Award, as the female Jewish Athlete of the Year.

== Programs ==
(with Mitchell)

Season	Original dance	Free dance	Exhibition
2005–2006	Merengue; Rhumba: Bésame; Maria by Ricky Martin	Variations on a Tango by Astor Piazzolla arranged by Antonio Najarro	
2003–2004	Flood Down in Texas; House is Rockin' by Stevie Ray Vaughan	Bajafondo Tango Club	What a Wonderful World by Louis Armstrong
2002–2003	March: Graduation Ball by Johann Strauss II; Waltz: Masquerade by Aram Khachaturian	The Mummy by Jerry Goldsmith	
2001–2002	Seduction by Oscar Lopez	Cinderella by Sergei Prokofiev	

== Competitive highlights ==
With Mitchell

GP: Grand Prix; JGP: Junior Grand Prix

International
Event	2000–01	2001–02	2002–03	2003–04	2004–05	2005–06
Four Continents				8th		
GP Cup of Russia						7th
GP Bofrost Cup				6th		
GP NHK Trophy				7th		
GP Skate Canada				9th	9th	
GP Skate America					9th	
Nebelhorn Trophy						4th
International: Junior
World Junior Champ.		12th	4th			
JGP Bulgaria		8th				
JGP China			3rd			
JGP Czech Republic	8th					
JGP Norway	9th					
JGP United States			3rd			
NACS Toronto						
National
U.S. Championships	5th J.	1st J.	4th	3rd	WD	9th

== Pageants ==
Galler-Rabinowitz competed in the Miss Massachusetts USA 2010 pageant in 2009 and made the semi-finals. After winning the Miss Collegiate Area local pageant, she won the Miss Massachusetts title on June 26, 2010. She competed in the Miss America 2011 pageant in January 2011, and won the Children's Miracle Network's Miss Miracle Maker award for raising the most money for charity.

== See also ==
- List of Jewish figure skaters

Awards and achievements
Preceded by Amanda Kelly	Miss Massachusetts; 2010	Succeeded by Molly Whalen
