= Kim Min-woo (figure skater) =

South Korean ice dancer (1986–2007)

Personal information
- Born: February 5, 1986
- Died: October 4, 2007 (aged 21)
- Height: 1.75 m (5 ft 9 in)

Figure skating career
- Country: South Korea
- Partner: Kim Hye-Min
- Coach: Igor Yaroshenko, Irina Romanova
- Retired: 2006

- Kim Min-woo
- Hangul: 김민우
- RR: Gim Minu
- MR: Kim Minu

Kim Min-woo (February 5, 1986 – October 4, 2007) was a South Korean ice dancer. He was born in Seoul, South Korea. He competed with his sister Kim Hye-Min. Together they were the 2003-2005 South Korean national champions. They twice placed 15th at the Four Continents Championships. Kim & Kim were coached by Igor Yaroshenko and Irina Romanova. They retired from competitive skating in 2006.

He died of a car accident in Seoul on October 4, 2007.

== Competitive highlights ==
(with Kim)

Event	1997–98	1998–99	1999–00	2000–01	2001–02	2002–03	2003–04	2004–05	2005–06
Four Continents Championships								15th	15th
Asian Winter Games						6th			
South Korean Championships	2nd	2nd	2nd	2nd	2nd	1st	1st	1st	
Winter Universiade								14th	
