= Attila Elek =

Hungarian ice dancer (born 1982)

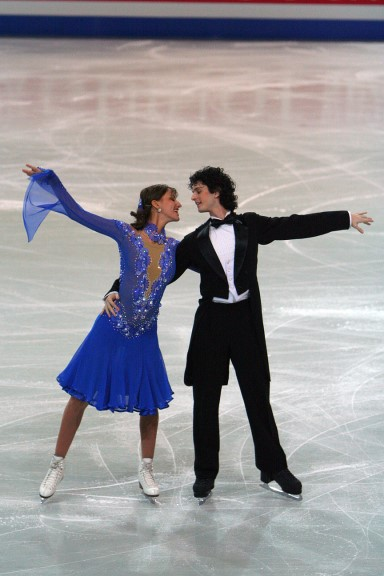
- Hoffmann and Elek at the 2007 European Championships

Personal information
- Born: 6 December 1982 (age 43) Budapest, Hungarian People's Republic
- Height: 1.74 m (5 ft 8 1/2 in)

Figure skating career
- Country: Hungary
- Skating club: Piruett S.E. Budapest
- Began skating: 1987

Attila Elek (born 6 December 1982 in Budapest) is a Hungarian ice dancer. With former partner Nóra Hoffmann, he is a two-time (2003–2004) World Junior silver medalist, the 2003 JGP Final champion, and a five-time (2003–2007) Hungarian national champion. They placed 17th at the 2006 Winter Olympics in Torino.

== Career ==
Elek was paired with Nóra Hoffmann by coaches when he was nine years old. They twice won the silver medal at Junior Worlds, in 2003 and 2004. Hoffmann / Elek were silver medalists at the 2002–2003 Junior Grand Prix Final and won the title in 2003–2004. On the senior Grand Prix series, their best placement was 5th at 2006 Cup of Russia. Their best finish at senior Worlds was 15th in 2005. They competed at the 2006 Olympics, finishing 17th. During the warm-up at 2006 Worlds, another couple was performing a lift nearby and the woman's skates accidentally cut Hoffmann's back and elbow. Despite the pain, Hoffmann skated with Elek a few minutes later and they finished 18th.

At the 2007 European Championships, they were 7th after the original dance but they were forced to withdraw – Elek broke his leg during the morning practice before the free dance. They split up at the end of the season.

== Personal life ==
Elek's younger brother is György Elek, who also competed in ice dancing.

== Programs ==
(with Hoffmann)

Season	Original dance	Free dance
2006–2007	Tango	Swing, Brother Swing; Why don't you do Right? by Julie London; Swing, Brother Swing
2005–2006	Cha Cha; Rhumba; Samba	Flamenco medley
2004–2005	Slow foxtrot: Singing in the Rain; Quickstep: Music from "Ballroom Dancers"	Once Upon a Time in Mexico
2003–2004	Rock'n'roll: Great Balls of Fire; Blues: Big Legged Woman; Rock'n'roll: Great Balls of Fire	Dance with Me: Black Machine by Jazz Machine; You are my Everything by Ana Gabriel; Pantera en Libertad by Monica Navanjo
2002–2003	Quickstep; Slow foxtrot; Quickstep	Quidam (from Cirque du Soleil by René Dupéré
2001–2002	Tango: Sombras; Flamenco: Granada	Toccata and Fugue in D-Minor (modern version) by Johann Sebastian Bach
2000–2001	Waltz: My Sweet and Tender Beast by Eugen Doga; Polka: Tritsch-Tratsch-Polka, op. 214 by Johann Strauss II	Lovely Sunset by Claude Challe

== Results ==
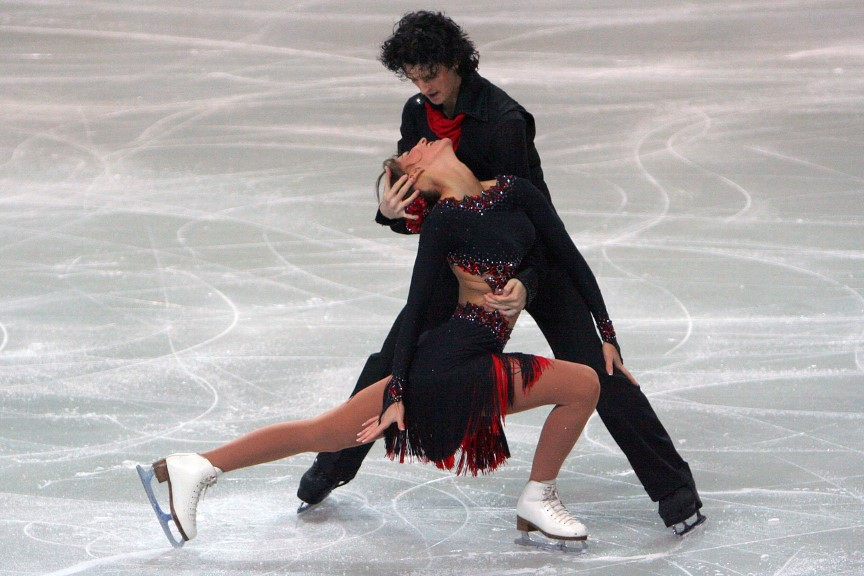
Hoffmann / Elek at the 2007 European Championships

(with Hoffmann)

Results
International
Event	1998–99	1999–00	2000–01	2001–02	2002–03	2003–04	2004–05	2005–06	2006–07
Olympics								17th	
Worlds					18th	18th	15th	18th	
Europeans					14th	11th	10th	12th	WD**
GP Bompard							7th		6th
GP Cup of China							6th		
GP Cup of Russia									5th
GP NHK Trophy								7th	
Bofrost Cup						5th			
Golden Spin						1st			
Karl Schäfer								8th	
International: Junior
Junior Worlds	21st	17th	9th	5th	2nd	2nd			
JGP Final				5th	2nd	1st			
JGP Bulgaria				3rd		1st			
JGP China	9th								
JGP Germany					1st				
JGP Italy				2nd					
JGP Japan		6th							
JGP Mexico	7th		3rd						
JGP Netherlands		8th							
JGP Norway			4th						
JGP Slovenia						1st			
JGP USA					1st				
National
Hungarian	2nd J.	1st J.	1st J.		1st	1st	1st	1st	1st
