= Yukina Ota =

Japanese figure skater

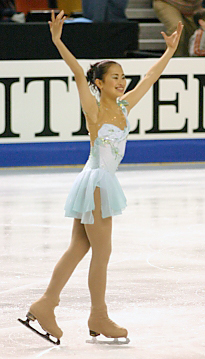
- Ota at the 2004 Four Continents Championships.

Personal information
- Other names: Yukina Ohta
- Born: November 26, 1986 (age 39) Kyoto, Kyoto Prefecture
- Height: 1.58 m (5 ft 2 in)

Figure skating career
- Country: Japan
- Skating club: Kyoto Daigo FSC
- Began skating: 1993
- Retired: November 26, 2008

Medal record
Four Continents Championships
Gold medal – first place	2004 Hamilton	Singles
World Junior Championships
Gold medal – first place	2003 Ostrava	Singles
Junior Grand Prix Final
Gold medal – first place	2002–03 The Hague	Singles

Yukina Ōta (太田 由希奈, Ōta Yukina; born November 26, 1986 in Kyoto) is a Japanese figure skater. She is the 2003 World Junior champion and the 2004 Four Continents champion. She announced her retirement from competitive skating in November 2008, due to injury.

== Career ==
Ota won the bronze medal at the 2000–2001 Japan Junior Championships. In the 2001–2002 season, Ota made her Junior Grand Prix debut. She won her event in Bulgaria and placed 4th at the event in Sweden to qualify for the Junior Grand Prix Final, where she placed 6th. She won a second bronze medal at the 2001–2002 Japan Junior Championships, which qualified her for the 2002 Junior Worlds. She placed 9th at that competition. In the 2002–2003 season, Ota competed on the 2002–2003 ISU Junior Grand Prix circuit. She won both her events to qualify for the Junior Grand Prix Final, which she won. She placed fourth at the Japan Championships and qualified for Junior Worlds. She won the 2003 World Junior title. In the 2003–2004 season, Ota made her senior international debut. She competed on the Grand Prix of Figure Skating. She placed 4th at the 2003 Skate Canada International and 6th at the 2003 NHK Trophy. At the Japan Championships, Ota placed fifth. She competed at the 2004 Four Continents and won the event after placing third in the short program and second in the free skate. In the 2004–2005 season, Ota competed again on the senior international circuit. She placed 7th at the 2004 Skate America.

Ota missed the 2005–2006 season due to injury. In the 2006–2007 season, Ota began competing again. She placed 12th at the Japan Championships. In the 2007–2008 season, Ota competed at the 2007 Golden Spin of Zagreb international competition and placed 7th. At the Japan Championship, she placed 7th. Ota withdrew from events to qualify for the 2008–2009 Japan Championships before they began.

She announced her retirement from competitive skating on November 26, 2008, her 22nd birthday, due to injury. Following her retirement, she has skated professionally in ice shows.

== Programs ==
Season	Short program	Free skating	Exhibition
2007–2008	Madama Butterfly by Giacomo Puccini	Concierto de Aranjuez by Joaquín Rodrigo	
2006–2007	Swan Lake by Pyotr Ilyich Tchaikovsky	El amor brujo by Manuel de Falla	Anytime, Anywhere by Sarah Brightman
2005–2006			Anytime, Anywhere by Sarah Brightman
2004–2005	Tzigane by Maurice Ravel	Madama Butterfly by Giacomo Puccini	Anytime, Anywhere by Sarah Brightman
2003–2004	Picasso's Dance; Omotai (from Between Black and White)	Daphnis et Chloé by Maurice Ravel	Last Dance by Donna Summer
2002–2003	Danse macabre by Charles-Camille Saint-Saëns	Turandot by Giacomo Puccini performed by Vanessa-Mae	Twilight Waltz by Takashi Kako
2001–2002	Poeta by Vicente Amigo	Turandot by Giacomo Puccini performed by Vanessa-Mae	
2000–2001	Tango from Cirque du Soleil	West Side Story by Leonard Bernstein	

== Results ==
Results
International
Event	97–98	98–99	99–00	00–01	01–02	02–03	03–04	04–05	05–06	06–07	07–08
Four Continents							1st				
GP NHK Trophy							6th				
GP Skate America								7th			
GP Skate Canada							4th				
Golden Spin											4th
International: Junior
Junior Worlds					9th	1st					
JGP Final					6th	1st					
JGP Bulgaria					1st						
JGP Italy						1st					
JGP Sweden					4th						
JGP Yugoslavia						1st					
National
Japan Champ.						4th	5th			12th	7th
Japan Junior			11th	6th	3rd	3rd					
Japan Novice	1st B	9th A	3rd A								
GP = Grand Prix; JGP = Junior Grand Prix; Ota did not compete in the 2005–2006 season.
