= Electric Samurai (The Noble Savage) =

Studio album by Tomoyasu Hotei
- Released: March 30, 2004
- Genre: Rock, electronic
- Length: 45:47
- Label: EMI/Virgin
- Producer: Tomoyasu Hotei

Tomoyasu Hotei chronology
Doberman (2003)	Electric Samurai (The Noble Savage) (2004)	Monster Drive (2005)

Electric Samurai (The Noble Savage) is a 2004 album by Tomoyasu Hotei. In addition to a few original tracks, the album includes much of Hotei's work for the soundtracks of the films Samurai Fiction and New Battles Without Honor and Humanity (Another Battle). The three versions of "Battle Without Honor or Humanity" included were originally used on the soundtrack of the latter, although the original version was prominently featured in Quentin Tarantino's Kill Bill.

== Track listing ==
All tracks by Tomoyasu Hotei, except where noted

1. "Battle Without Honor or Humanity" – 2:29
2. "Katana Groove" – 4:12
3. "Jingi" – 1:58
4. "Kill The Target" – 2:52
5. "Immigrant Song" (Page, Plant) – 2:53
6. "Battle Without Honor or Humanity #2" – 1:35
7. "Frozen Memories" – 4:01
8. "Believe Me, I'm A Liar" (Hotei, Price) – 4:15
9. "Battle Without Honor or Humanity #3" (Hotei) – 2:31
10. "Dark Wind" – 2:48
11. "Space Cowboy" – 2:32
12. "Metropolis" (Hotei, Fujii) – 3:46
13. "Howling" – 5:34
14. "Fetish" – 4:21

== Personnel ==
- Zachary Alford – drums (tracks: 5, 14)
- Toshio Arai – trumpet
- Dave Bishop – saxophone (track: 14)
- Takeshi Fujii – programming
- Simon Gardner – trumpet, flugelhorn
- Mike Garson – piano (track: 14)
- Itaru Hirama – photography
- Satoshi Hirose – A&R assistance
- Tomoyasu Hotei – bass, guitar, drums, keyboards, vocals, liner notes
- Yoshifumi Iio – engineer, mixing
- Kunihiko Imai – engineer, mixing
- Tomio Inoue – bass
- Senji Kasuya – executive producer
- Kazumi Kurigami – cover photo
- Kyoko Matsuda – translation
- Yoichi Murata – trombone, horn arrangements (tracks: 1,3, 14)
- Jeff Patterson – backing vocals
- Darren Price – programming, engineer, mixing
- Masaaki Saito – executive producer
- Ken Shima – string arrangements
- Steve Sidwell – trumpet, flugelhorn
- Masahiko Sugasaka – trumpet
- Shoji Uchida – photography
- Steve Walters – bass (track: 14)
- Hideo Yamaki – drums
- Michael Zimmerling – engineer, mixing

== Credits ==
- Edited by – Toshiyuki Kishi (tracks: 1, 3, 4, 6, 7, 9, 13, 14)
- Producer – Tomoyasu Hotei
- Programmed by – Nobutaka Watanabe (tracks: 2, 5), Takeshi Fujii (tracks: 2, 10, 12), Toshiyuki Kishi (tracks: 1, 3, 4, 6, 7, 9, 13, 14)
- Recorded and Mixed by – Kunihiko Imai (tracks: 1 to 3, 5 to 11, 13, 14), Michael Zimmerling (track: 12)
- Mastering Engineer – Ian Cooper
