= Kim Hye-min =

South Korean ice dancer (born 1985)

Personal information
- Born: February 20, 1985 (age 41)
- Height: 1.60 m (5 ft 3 in)

Figure skating career
- Country: South Korea
- Partner: Kim Min-woo
- Coach: Igor Yaroshenko, Irina Romanova
- Retired: 2006

- Kim Hye-min
- Hangul: 김혜민
- RR: Gim Hyemin
- MR: Kim Hyemin

Kim Hye-min (Korean: 김혜민; born February 20, 1985) is a retired South Korean ice dancer. She was born in Seoul, South Korea. She competed with brother Kim Min-woo. Together they were the 2003–2005 South Korean national champions. They twice placed 15th at the Four Continents Championships. Kim & Kim were coached by Igor Yaroshenko and Irina Romanova. They retired from competitive skating in 2006.

== Competitive highlights ==
(with Kim)

Event	1997–98	1998–99	1999–00	2000–01	2001–02	2002–03	2003–04	2004–05	2005–06
Four Continents Championships								15th	15th
Asian Winter Games						6th			
South Korean Championships	2nd	2nd	2nd	2nd	2nd	1st	1st	1st	
Winter Universiade								14th	
