= David Mitchell (figure skater) =

American ice dancer

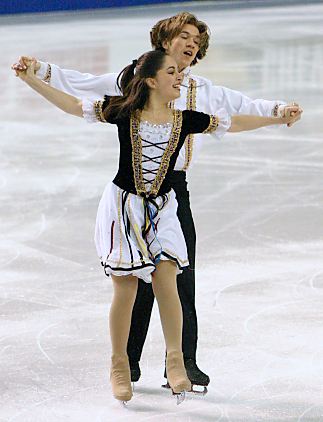

Personal information
- Born: April 23, 1982 (age 44) Ann Arbor, Michigan, U.S.
- Height: 5 ft 8 in (1.72 m)

Figure skating career
- Country: United States
- Skating club: SC Boston
- Retired: 2006

David Mitchell (born April 23, 1982) is an American retired ice dancer. He competed for most of his career with partner Loren Galler-Rabinowitz. Together they are the 2004 U.S. bronze medalists.

== Career ==
Mitchell began skating at the age of eight and took up ice dancing at ten. He teamed up with Galler-Rabinowitz before the 1999 season, finishing fifth on the novice level at their first-time competition at the United States Figure Skating Championships. They went on to win the novice title in 2000 and the junior title in 2002. That, combined with their pewter medal in 2003 at the senior level, made them the first US figure skaters to medal at the Novice, Junior, and Senior levels at Nationals in a four-year span. The pair finished fourth in the 2003 World Junior Figure Skating Championships.

Galler-Rabinowitz and Mitchell won bronze at the 2004 U.S. Championships. They missed the following year's national championship due to surgery to repair torn cartilage in Mitchell's shoulder. Their bronze medal finish was noteworthy in that both teams who placed above them were at the time ineligible for the Olympics. Had the Olympics been held that year, Mitchell and Galler-Rabinowitz would have been the highest ranking US ice dancers sent.

The pair made news in late 2005 when Mitchell's mother campaigned against a bill that would make ice dancers Tanith Belbin and Maxim Zavozin U.S. citizens in time for the 2006 Winter Olympics. Despite her letter urging Senator Hillary Clinton to vote against it, the bill passed. The effort was moot, however: Galler-Rabinowitz and Mitchell only finished ninth at the 2006 U.S. Championships, which would not have scored the duo an Olympic berth even if the Belbin and Zavozin teams had been ineligible.

Mitchell retired after the 2005/2006 competitive season.

== Personal life ==
Mitchell graduated from Tufts University in 2004 where he studied Political Science & Government and was a brother at Delta Tau Delta. He is currently attending Law School at the University of Florida.

== Competitive highlights ==
(with Galler-Rabinowitz)

Event	2000–01	2001–02	2002–03	2003–04	2004–05	2005–06
Four Continents Championships				8th		
World Junior Championships		12th	4th			
U.S. Championships	5th J.	1st J.	4th	3rd		9th
Cup of Russia						7th
Skate Canada				9th	9th	
Skate America					9th	
Bofrost Cup				6th		
NHK Trophy				7th		
Nebelhorn Trophy						4th
Junior Grand Prix, China			3rd			
Junior Grand Prix, USA			3rd			
Junior Grand Prix, Bulgaria		8th				
Junior Grand Prix, Norway	9th					
Junior Grand Prix, Czech Republic	8th					
N. = Novice level; J. = Junior level

== Programs ==
(with Galler-Rabinowitz)

Season	Original dance	Free dance	Exhibition
2005–2006	Merengue; Rhumba: Bésame; Maria by Ricky Martin	Variations on a Tango by Astor Piazzolla arranged by Antonio Najarro	
2003–2004	Flood Down in Texas; House is Rockin' by Stevie Ray Vaughan	Bajafondo Tango Club	What a Wonderful World by Louis Armstrong
2002–2003	March: Graduation Ball by Johann Strauss II; Waltz: Masquerade by Aram Khachaturian	The Mummy by Jerry Goldsmith	
2001–2002	Seduction by Oscar Lopez	Cinderella by Sergei Prokofiev	
