= Burkhard Dallwitz =

German composer

- Born: Bad Homburg, Hesse, West Germany (now Germany)
- Genre: Film score
- Occupation: Composer
- Years active: 1985–present
- Member of: Zeitgeist Music
- Website: www.burkharddallwitz.com.au

Burkhard von Dallwitz (born 28 January 1959) is a German-Australian composer. Since 1984, he has worked as a composer for feature films, television and commercials in Australia, Europe and the United States. He won the Golden Globe Award for Best Original Score for his work on The Truman Show (1998).

== Early life and education ==
Dallwitz began ten years of classical piano training at the age of eight. By thirteen he was writing songs and music, and from fifteen, Dallwitz wrote, arranged and performed for various musical groups.

In 1979, Dallwitz moved to Australia where he studied music at La Trobe University in Melbourne. He majored with musical composition, and studied advanced composition under the tutelage of Keith Humble.

In 1996, he released his first CD recording of original instrumental works called Worlds Apart.

He is the co-founder of Zeitgeist Music with Brett Aplin and Dmitri Golovko.

== Underbelly theme and Olympics theme ==
Dallwitz worked on the Nine Network Australia television series Underbelly, and the UK.TV mini-series False Witness where he wrote the theme and the original musical score. He also composed the theme for the Seven Network's coverage of the Beijing 2008 Olympics (in addition to the 2000, 2002, 2004 and 2006 compositions) and more recently the soundtrack for the 2011 movie The Way Back.

== Awards and nominations ==
In 1999, Burkhard and Philip Glass were awarded the Golden Globe for Best Original Score in a Motion Picture for The Truman Show. The score also won The Chicago Film Critics' Award and the ASCAP Film and Television Award, and the soundtrack reached number two on the Billboard chart.

In 2001, he won the APRA award for Best Television Theme for the Sydney Olympics in 2000. The world renowned 385 voice Mormon Tabernacle Choir performed and recorded his 2002 theme for the Salt Lake Winter Olympics. In 2004, he won the APRA-AGSC (Australian Guild of Screen Composers) Screen Music Award 'Best Music for a Television Series' for CrashBurn. Burkhard has several soundtrack albums out in general release.

=== APRA-AGSC Awards ===
The annual Screen Music Awards are presented by Australasian Performing Right Association (APRA) and Australian Guild of Screen Composers (AGSC) for television and film scores and soundtracks.

Year	Nominee / work	Award	Result
2004	"Episode 13" – CrashBurn	Best Music for a Television Series or Serial	Won
2004	CrashBurn	Best Television Theme	Nominated
2006	The Caterpillar Wish	Feature Film Score of the Year	Nominated
2006	The Caterpillar Wish	Best Soundtrack Album	Nominated
2006	Torino 2006 Winter Olympics	Best Television Theme	Nominated
2008	"Episode 5" – Underbelly	Best Music for a Television Series or Serial	Won
2008	Underbelly	Best Television Theme	Won
2008	"It’s a Jungle Out There" – Underbelly	Best Original Song Composed for the Screen	Nominated
2009	False Witness	Best Music for a Mini-Series or Telemovie	Nominated
2009	"Episode 9 – Judas Kiss" – Underbelly: A Tale of Two Cities	Best Music for a Television Series or Serial	Nominated

=== ARIA Music Awards ===
The ARIA Music Awards is an annual awards ceremony that recognises excellence, innovation, and achievement across all genres of Australian music. They commenced in 1987.

Year	Nominee / work	Award	Result	Ref.
2010	Underbelly	Best Original Soundtrack, Cast or Show Album	Nominated	
2019	LOCUSTS: Original Motion Picture Soundtrack	Best Original Soundtrack, Cast or Show Album	Nominated	
2023	Splice Here: A Projected Odyssey (Original Motion Picture Soundtrack) (with Brett Aplin)	Best Original Soundtrack, Cast or Show Album	Nominated	
