= Jamal Othman =

Swiss figure skater

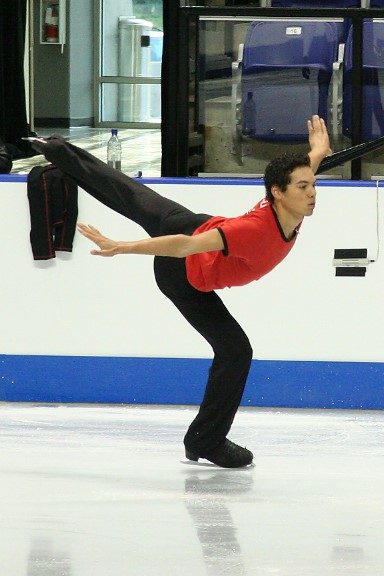
- Othman in 2006.

Personal information
- Full name: Jamal Aziz Othman
- Born: 13 August 1986 (age 40) Worb
- Height: 1.86 m (6 ft 1 in)

Figure skating career
- Country: Switzerland
- Coach: Jacqueline Kiefer
- Skating club: Schlittschuh Club Bern

Medal record
Swiss Championships
Gold medal – first place	2009 La Chaux-de-Fonds	Singles
Silver medal – second place	2002 Zurich	Singles
Silver medal – second place	2005 Lausanne	Singles
Silver medal – second place	2006 Biasca	Singles
Silver medal – second place	2007 Geneva	Singles
Silver medal – second place	2010 Lugano	Singles
Bronze medal – third place	2004 Neuchâtel	Singles
Bronze medal – third place	2008 Winterthur	Singles

Jamal Aziz Othman (born 13 August 1986 in Worb, Canton of Bern) is a Swiss former competitive figure skater. He is the 2009 Swiss national champion and a five-time (2002, 2005–2007, 2010) national silver medalist.

== Career ==
Othman began skating at age six after previously trying gymnastics and rock and roll dancing. He was the 1999 Swiss Novice Champion and the 2000 and 2001 Swiss Junior Champion. He qualified for three Junior Grand Prix Finals, withdrawing from one due to a foot injury, and competed four times at Junior Worlds.

In the 2005–2006 season, Othman had to fight to earn his spot on the Swiss Olympic team. Switzerland had two spots to the Olympics, but Othman's silver medal at the Swiss Championships only secured him spots on the teams to Worlds and Europeans. Othman competed at the German Championships, but did not place high enough to qualify for the Olympics. At the European Championships, Othman finished 21st. The Swiss Olympic Committee gave him one last chance and Othman skated his programs in front of a panel. He performed well enough to be placed on the Olympic team. At the Olympics, he failed to make it out of the short program.

Othman began the 2006–2007 season by placing ninth at Skate Canada International. He then went to Trophée Eric Bompard, where he placed 11th. He won his third consecutive silver medal at the Swiss national championships. At the 2007 European Figure Skating Championships, Othman went in as the top-ranked Swiss skater, due to the withdrawal of Stéphane Lambiel. Othman skated two personal best program and cracked the top ten for the first time. His placement, combined with that of countryman Moris Pfeifhofer, ensured Switzerland two spots in the 2008 Championships.

At 186 cm, Othman is very tall for a single skater, and his height allows him to perform rare positions in his spins. He has competed at both French and German nationals to gain competitive experience.

In 2017, Othman married French ice dance coach Romain Haguenauer.

Othman is the managing director of representation agency, Markey International Arts, which works in partnership with the Ice Academy of Montreal.

== Programs ==
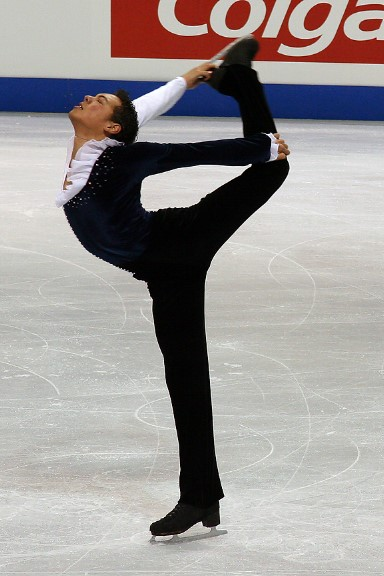
Othman's signature half-Biellmann spin.

Season	Short program	Free skating
2009–2010	A Transylvanian Lullaby (from Young Frankenstein) by John Morris; Devil's Dance (from The Witches of Eastwick) by John Williams	Asturias by Isaac Albeniz
2008–2009	Ice Queen; Raks Afrika by Paul Dinletir	Asturias by Isaac Albeniz
2007–2008	Ice Queen; Raks Afrika by Paul Dinletir	Lunatico by Gotan Project
2006–2007	Danse Macabre by Camille Saint-Saëns	Lunatico by Gotan Project
2005–2006	My Affectionate and Tender Beast by Eugen Doga	El amor brujo by Manuel de Falla
2004–2005	My Affectionate and Tender Beast by Eugen Doga	Night Bird by Michel Colombier; Édith et Marcel by Francis Lai
2003–2004	Don Juan DeMarco by Michael Kamen; Frida by Elliot Goldenthal	L'ultimo bacio by Paolo Buonvino
2002–2003	Anna and the King by George Fenton	L'ultimo bacio by Paolo Buonvino
2001–2002	Anna and the King by George Fenton	Operas by Giuseppe Verdi, Gioachino Rossini Berlin Philharmonic Orchestra
2000–2001	Caprice Viennoise; Gipsy Carnival by Fritz Kreisler F. Liz Chamber Orchestra	Moldau by Bedřich Smetana Vienna Philharmonic

== Competitive highlights ==
GP: Grand Prix; JGP: Junior Grand Prix

International
Event	99–00	00–01	01–02	02–03	03–04	04–05	05–06	06–07	07–08	08–09	09–10
Olympics							27th				
Worlds						21st	28th	18th	22nd	26th	22nd
Europeans						11th	21st	8th		12th	
GP Bompard							12th	11th			
GP Cup of China									8th		
GP NHK Trophy										12th	
GP Skate Canada							11th	9th	10th		
Nepela Memorial										3rd	3rd
NRW Trophy											8th
Crystal Skate				5th							
Finlandia Trophy									6th		
Nebelhorn Trophy						5th			9th		
Universiade								9th		21st	
International: Junior
Junior Worlds		31st	18th	39th	20th						
JGP Final			9th	WD		7th					
JGP Canada				3rd							
JGP China						2nd					
JGP Germany						1st					
JGP Italy			4th	3rd							
JGP Japan					6th						
JGP Netherlands			2nd								
JGP Norway		20th									
JGP Poland					13th						
JGP Romania				5th							
Gardena		4th									
Heiko Fischer	1st J										
National
Swiss Championships	1st J	1st J	2nd		3rd	2nd	2nd	2nd	3rd	1st	2nd
German Championships							4th				
