= ISU Junior Grand Prix in Bulgaria =

International figure skating competition

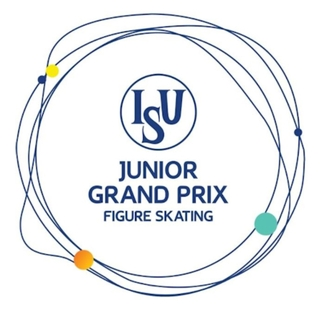
- Status: Inactive
- Genre: ISU Junior Grand Prix
- Frequency: Occasional
- Location: Sofia
- Country: Bulgaria
- Inaugurated: 1997
- Most recent: 2007
- Organizer: Bulgarian Skating Federation

The ISU Junior Grand Prix in Bulgaria – also known as the Sofia Cup – is an international figure skating competition sanctioned by the International Skating Union (ISU), organized and hosted by the Bulgarian Skating Federation (Bulgarian: Българска Федерация по кънки). It is held periodically as an event of the ISU Junior Grand Prix of Figure Skating (JGP), a series of international competitions exclusively for junior-level skaters. Medals may be awarded in men's singles, women's singles, pair skating, and ice dance. Skaters earn points based on their results at the qualifying competitions each season, and the top skaters or teams in each discipline are invited to then compete at the Junior Grand Prix of Figure Skating Final.

== History ==
The ISU Junior Grand Prix of Figure Skating (JGP) was established by the International Skating Union (ISU) in 1997 and consists of a series of seven international figure skating competitions exclusively for junior-level skaters. The locations of the Junior Grand Prix events change every year. While all seven competitions feature the men's, women's, and ice dance events, only four competitions each season feature the pairs event. Skaters earn points based on their results each season, and the top skaters or teams in each discipline are then invited to compete at the Junior Grand Prix of Figure Skating Final.

Skaters are eligible to compete on the junior-level circuit if they are at least 13 years old before 1 July of the respective season, but not yet 19 (for single skaters), 21 (for men and women in ice dance and women in pair skating), or 23 (for men in pair skating). Competitors are chosen by their respective skating federations. The number of entries allotted to each ISU member nation in each discipline is determined by their results at the prior World Junior Figure Skating Championships.

Bulgaria hosted its first Junior Grand Prix competition during the inaugural season in 1997 in Sofia. Ivan Dinev of Bulgaria won the men's event, Morgan Rowe of the United States won the women's event, Alena Maltseva and Oleg Popov of Russia won the pairs event, and Federica Faiella and Luciano Milo of Italy won the ice dance event. The event was held several times since; its most recent appearance was in 2007.

Bulgaria hosted the 2006 Junior Grand Prix of Figure Skating Final – the culminating event of the Junior Grand Prix series – in Sofia. Stephen Carriere and Caroline Zhang won the men's and women's events, respectively, while Keauna McLaughlin and Rockne Brubaker won the pairs event, and Madison Hubbell and Keiffer Hubbell, won the ice dance event. All champions were from the United States.

== Medalists ==
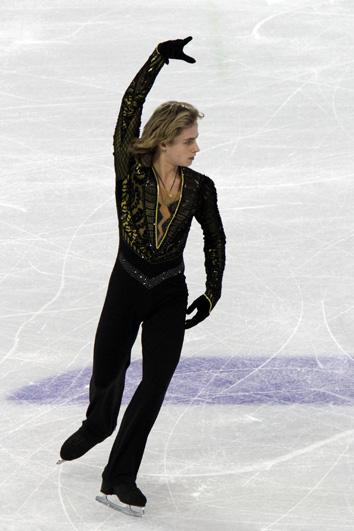
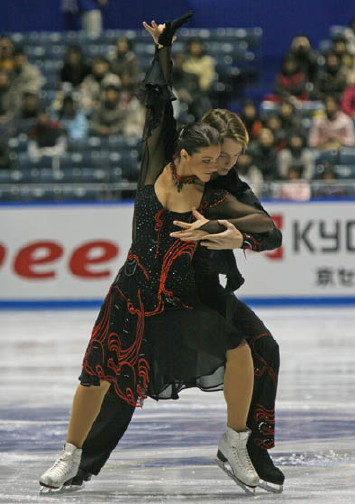
The 2007 Sofia Cup champions: Artem Borodulin of Russia (men's singles); and Isabella Pajardi and Stefano Caruso of Italy (ice dance)
Not pictured: Morgan Rowe of the United States (women's singles)

=== Men's singles ===
Men's event medalists
Year	Location	Gold	Silver	Bronze	Ref.
1997	Sofia	(Bulgaria) Ivan Dinev	(United States) Derrick Delmore	(Japan) Yosuke Takeuchi	
1998	Sofia	(Russia) Ilia Klimkin	(Germany) Stefan Lindemann	(Japan) Soshi Tanaka	
2001	Sofia	(Canada) Shawn Sawyer	(Japan) Daisuke Takahashi	(United States) Shaun Rogers	
2003	Sofia	(Russia) Andrei Griazev	(Czech Republic) Tomáš Verner	(Canada) Shawn Sawyer	
2005	Sofia	(United States) Stephen Carriere	(United States) Traighe Rouse	(Russia) Sergei Voronov	
2006 Final	Sofia	(United States) Stephen Carriere	(United States) Brandon Mroz	(Canada) Kevin Reynolds	
2007	Sofia	(Russia) Artem Borodulin	(United States) Adam Rippon	(Canada) Jeremy Ten	

=== Women's singles ===
Women's event medalists
Year	Location	Gold	Silver	Bronze	Ref.
1997	Sofia	(United States) Morgan Rowe	(United States) Brittney McConn	(Japan) Chisato Shiina	
1998	Sofia	(Hungary) Tamara Dorofejev	(Russia) Daria Timoshenko	(Poland) Sabina Wojtala	
2001	Sofia	(Japan) Yukina Ota	(Russia) Olga Agapkina	(Japan) Yukari Nakano	
2003	Sofia	(Sweden) Lina Johansson	(United States) Kimmie Meissner	(Canada) Cynthia Phaneuf	
2005	Sofia	(South Korea) Yuna Kim	(United States) Katy Taylor	(United States) Juliana Cannarozzo	
2006 Final	Sofia	(United States) Caroline Zhang	(United States) Ashley Wagner	(United States) Megan Oster	
2007	Sofia	(United States) Chrissy Hughes	(Japan) Satsuki Muramoto	(Russia) Jana Smekhnova	

=== Pairs ===
Pairs event medalists
Year	Location	Gold	Silver	Bronze	Ref.
1997	Sofia	(Russia); Alena Maltseva; Oleg Popov	(Canada); Jacinthe Larivière; Lenny Faustino	(Russia); Irina Melihova; Vladimir Saprikin	
1998	Sofia	(Russia); Victoria Maxiuta; Vladislav Zhovnirski	(Russia); Alena Maltseva; Oleg Popov	(Poland); Aneta Kowalska; Łukasz Różycki	
2001	Sofia	(Russia); Julia Shapiro; Dmitri Khromin	(United States); Jacqueline Jimenez; Themistocles Leftheris	(Canada); Cathy Monette; Daniel Castelo	
2003	Sofia	(Russia); Natalia Shestakova; Pavel Lebedev	(Ukraine); Tatiana Volosozhar; Petro Kharchenko	(United States); Brittany Vise; Nicholas Kole	
2005	Sofia	(United States); Mariel Miller; Rockne Brubaker	(United States); Kendra Moyle; Andy Seitz	(Russia); Elizaveta Levshina; Konstantin Gavrin	
2006 Final	Sofia	(United States); Keauna McLaughlin; Rockne Brubaker	(Russia); Ksenia Krasilnikova; Konstantin Bezmaternikh	(United States); Jessica Rose Paetsch; Jon Nuss	
2007	Sofia	No pairs competition			

=== Ice dance ===
Ice dance event medalists
Year	Location	Gold	Silver	Bronze	Ref.
1997	Sofia	(Italy); Federica Faiella; Luciano Milo	(United States); Jamie Silverstein; Justin Pekarek	(Russia); Julia Golovina; Denis Egorov	
1998	Sofia	(Italy); Flavia Ottaviani; Massimo Scali	(Russia); Natalia Romaniuta; Daniil Barantsev	(United States); Emilie Nussear; Brandon Forsyth	
2001	Sofia	(Russia); Oksana Domnina; Maxim Bolotine	(Ukraine); Mariana Kozlova; Sergei Baranov	(Hungary); Nóra Hoffmann; Attila Elek	
2003	Sofia	(Hungary); Nóra Hoffmann; Attila Elek	(Italy); Camilla Spelta; Luca Lanotte	(Russia); Anastasia Platonova; Andrei Maximishin	
2005	Sofia	(United States); Meryl Davis; Charlie White	(Italy); Anna Cappellini; Luca Lanotte	(Russia); Anastasia Platonova; Andrei Maximishin	
2006 Final	Sofia	(United States); Madison Hubbell; Keiffer Hubbell	(United States); Emily Samuelson; Evan Bates	(Russia); Ekaterina Bobrova; Dmitri Soloviev	
2007	Sofia	(Italy); Isabella Pajardi; Stefano Caruso	(United States); Shannon Wingle; Ryan Devereaux	(Ukraine); Anastasia Vykhodtseva; Oleksii Shumskyi	
