= ISU Junior Grand Prix in Slovenia =

International figure skating competition

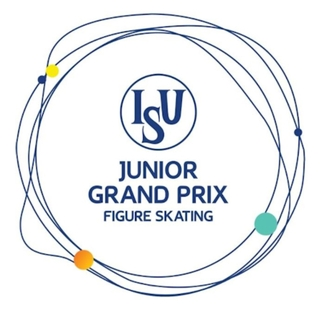
- Status: Active
- Genre: ISU Junior Grand Prix
- Frequency: Occasional
- Country: Slovenia
- Inaugurated: 1999
- Previous event: 2024
- Next event: 2026
- Organizer: Slovene Skating Union

The ISU Junior Grand Prix in Slovenia – also known as Skate Slovenia and the Ljubljana Cup – is an international figure skating competition sanctioned by the International Skating Union (ISU), organized and hosted by the Slovene Skating Union (Slovene: Zveza drsalnih športov Slovenije). It is held periodically as an event of the ISU Junior Grand Prix of Figure Skating (JGP), a series of international competitions exclusively for junior-level skaters. Medals may be awarded in men's singles, women's singles, pair skating, and ice dance. Skaters earn points based on their results at the qualifying competitions each season, and the top skaters or teams in each discipline are invited to then compete at the Junior Grand Prix of Figure Skating Final.

== History ==
The ISU Junior Grand Prix of Figure Skating (JGP) was established by the International Skating Union (ISU) in 1997 and consists of a series of seven international figure skating competitions exclusively for junior-level skaters. The locations of the Junior Grand Prix events change every year. While all seven competitions feature the men's, women's, and ice dance events, only four competitions each season feature the pairs event. Skaters earn points based on their results each season, and the top skaters or teams in each discipline are then invited to compete at the Junior Grand Prix of Figure Skating Final.

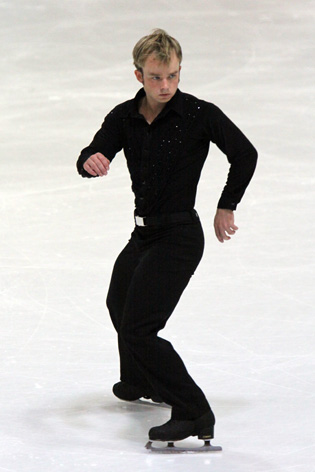
Stefan Lindemann of Germany, the men's champion at the inaugural Skate Slovenia

Skaters are eligible to compete on the junior-level circuit if they are at least 13 years old before 1 July of the respective season, but not yet 19 (for single skaters), 21 (for men and women in ice dance and women in pair skating), or 23 (for men in pair skating). Competitors are chosen by their respective skating federations. The number of entries allotted to each ISU member nation in each discipline is determined by their results at the prior World Junior Figure Skating Championships.

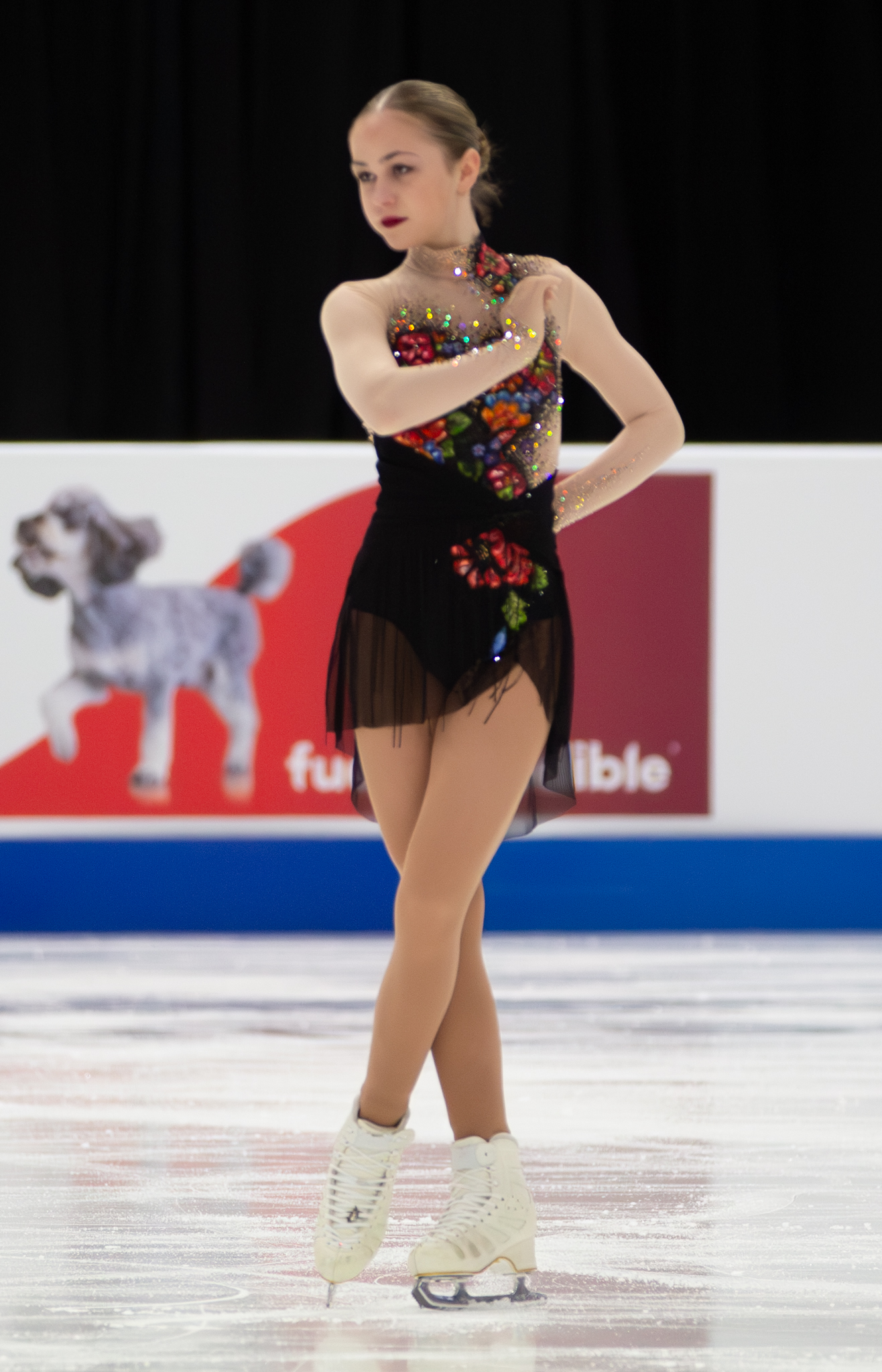
Sophie Joline von Felten, the women's champion at the 2024 Ljubljana Cup

Slovenia hosted its first Junior Grand Prix competition in 1999 in Bled. Stefan Lindemann of Germany won the men's event, Irina Tkatchuk of Russia won the women's event, Julia Shapiro and Alexei Sokolov of Russia won the pairs event, and Elena Khalyavina and Maxim Shabalin of Russia won the ice dance event.

Slovenia hosted the 2001 Junior Grand Prix of Figure Skating Final – the culminating event of the 2001–02 ISU Junior Grand Prix Series – in Bled. Stanislav Timchenko of Russia won the men's event, Miki Ando of Japan won the women's event, Zhang Dan and Zhang Hao of China won the pairs event, and Elena Khalyavina and Maxim Shabalin of Russia won the ice dance event.

The International Skating Union officially cancelled all scheduled Junior Grand Prix events for the 2020–21 season, which included the 2020 Ljubljana Cup, due to the COVID-19 pandemic, citing increased travel and entry requirements between countries and potentially excessive sanitary and health care costs for those hosting competitions. On 30 June 2026, the ISU announced that figure skaters from Russia and Belarus would be allowed to compete at international competitions as Individual Neutral Athletes (AINs). Each skater was required to undergo an individual assessment conducted by the ISU Council to determine whether they met the criteria for neutral status, which included having not previously taken active part in the Russian war in Ukraine, as well as not having actively or publicly supported the war. As AINs, Russian and Belarusian skaters were not permitted to compete under their national flags or anthems.

== Medalists ==
=== Men's singles ===
In 2026, Hiro Kaewtathip became the first skater from Thailand to win a gold medal at a Junior Grand Prix event, while also becoming the first skater from Thailand to qualify for the Junior Grand Prix Final.

Men's event medalists
Year	Location	Gold	Silver	Bronze	Ref.
1999	Bled	(Germany) Stefan Lindemann	(United States) Ben Miller	(Russia) Denis Balandin	
2001 Final	Bled	(Russia) Stanislav Timchenko	(China) Ma Xiaodong	(Belgium) Kevin van der Perren	
2003	Bled	(Canada) Christopher Mabee	(United States) Dennis Phan	(Canada) Shawn Sawyer	
2012	Bled	(United States) Joshua Farris	(China) Jin Boyang	(Russia) Alexander Samarin	
2014	Ljubljana	(China) Jin Boyang	(Russia) Alexander Petrov	(Russia) Dmitri Aliev	
2016	Ljubljana	(United States) Alexei Krasnozhon	(Russia) Ilia Skirda	(Japan) Kazuki Tomono	
2018	Ljubljana	(Russia) Petr Gumennik	(United States) Tomoki Hiwatashi	(Japan) Koshiro Shimada	
2020	Ljubljana	Competition cancelled due to the COVID-19 pandemic			
2021	Ljubljana	(Russia) Ilya Yablokov	(Estonia) Arlet Levandi	(United States) Matthew Nielsen	
2024	Ljubljana	(United States) Jacob Sanchez	(Slovakia) Adam Hagara	(Germany) Genrikh Gartung	
2026	Ljubljana	(Thailand) Hiro Kaewtathip	(South Korea) Lee Jae-keun	(Japan) Taiga Nishino	

=== Women's singles ===
In 2026, Hana Bath became the first singles skater from Australia to qualify for the Junior Grand Prix Final.

Women's event medalists
Year	Location	Gold	Silver	Bronze	Ref.
1999	Bled	(Russia) Irina Tkatchuk	(Hungary) Tamara Dorofejev	(Ukraine) Galina Maniachenko	
2001 Final	Bled	(Japan) Miki Ando	(Russia) Ludmila Nelidina	(Japan) Akiko Suzuki	
2003	Bled	(United States) Kimmie Meissner	(Sweden) Lina Johansson	(Hungary) Viktória Pavuk	
2012	Bled	(South Korea) Kim Hae-jin	(United States) Barbie Long	(Russia) Evgenia Gerasimova	
2014	Ljubljana	(Russia) Serafima Sakhanovich	(Japan) Yuka Nagai	(United States) Leah Keiser	
2016	Ljubljana	(Japan) Rika Kihira	(Japan) Marin Honda	(Russia) Alina Zagitova	
2018	Ljubljana	(Russia) Anastasia Tarakanova	(Russia) Anna Tarusina	(South Korea) Lee Hae-in	
2020	Ljubljana	Competition cancelled due to the COVID-19 pandemic			
2021	Ljubljana	(Russia) Adeliia Petrosian	(Russia) Sofia Samodelkina	(United States) Lindsay Thorngren	
2024	Ljubljana	(United States) Sophie Joline von Felten	(South Korea) Shin Ji-a	(Japan) Mei Okada	
2026	Ljubljana	(Australia) Hana Bath	(China) Liu Yuxuan	(Switzerland) Leandra Tzimpoukakis	

=== Pairs ===
Pairs event medalists
Year	Location	Gold	Silver	Bronze	Ref.
1999	Bled	(Russia); Julia Shapiro; Alexei Sokolov	(Ukraine); Aljona Savchenko; Stanislav Morozov	(Russia); Viktoria Shliakhova; Grigori Petrovski	
2001 Final	Bled	(China); Zhang Dan; Zhang Hao	(Russia); Julia Karbovskaya; Sergei Slavnov	(China); Ding Yang; Ren Zhongfei	
2003	Bled	(Russia); Tatiana Kokoreva; Egor Golovkin	(Russia); Natalia Shestakova; Pavel Lebedev	(Canada); Terra Findlay; John Mattatal	
No pairs competitions since 2003

=== Ice dance ===
Ice dance event medalists
Year	Location	Gold	Silver	Bronze	Ref.
1999	Bled	(Russia); Elena Khalyavina; Maxim Shabalin	(France); Caroline Truong; Sylvain Longchambon	(Italy); Flavia Ottaviani; Massimo Scali	
2001 Final	Bled	(Russia); Elena Khalyavina; Maxim Shabalin	(Russia); Elena Romanovskaya; Alexander Grachev	(Germany); Miriam Steinel; Vladimir Tsvetkov	
2003	Bled	(Hungary); Nóra Hoffmann; Attila Elek	(Russia); Ekaterina Rubleva; Ivan Shefer	(Italy); Anna Cappellini; Matteo Zanni	
2012	Bled	(United States); Alexandra Aldridge; Daniel Eaton	(Russia); Anna Yanovskaya; Sergey Mozgov	(Canada); Andréanne Poulin; Marc-André Servant	
2014	Ljubljana	(Russia); Daria Morozova; Mikhail Zhirnov	(Canada); Brianna Delmaestro; Timothy Lum	(United States); Holly Moore; Daniel Klaber	
2016	Ljubljana	(United States); Lorraine McNamara; Quinn Carpenter	(Russia); Sofia Polishchuk; Alexander Vakhnov	(Russia); Anastasia Skoptsova; Kirill Aleshin	
2018	Ljubljana	(United States); Avonley Nguyen; Vadym Kolesnik	(Russia); Sofia Shevchenko; Igor Eremenko	(Russia); Polina Ivanenko; Daniil Karpov	
2020	Ljubljana	Competition cancelled due to the COVID-19 pandemic			
2021	Ljubljana	(Russia); Vasilisa Kaganovskaia; Valeriy Angelopol	(United States); Katarina Wolfkostin; Jeffrey Chen	(Canada); Natalie D'Alessandro; Bruce Waddell	
2024	Ljubljana	(Ukraine); Iryna Pidgaina; Artem Koval	(France); Célina Fradji; Jean-Hans Fourneaux	(United States); Caroline Mullen; Brendan Mullen	
2026	Ljubljana	(Germany); Darya Grimm; Grigorii Rodin	(France); Ambre Perrier Gianesini; Samuel Blanc Klaperman	(United States); Aneta Vaclavikova; William Lissauer	
