= ISU Junior Grand Prix in Slovakia =

International figure skating competition

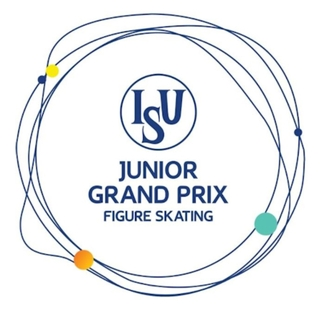
- Status: Inactive
- Genre: ISU Junior Grand Prix
- Frequency: Occasional
- Country: Slovakia
- Inaugurated: 1997
- Most recent: 2021
- Organizer: Slovak Figure Skating Association

The ISU Junior Grand Prix in Slovakia – also known as Skate Slovakia – is an international figure skating competition sanctioned by the International Skating Union (ISU), organized and hosted by the Slovak Figure Skating Association (Slovak: Slovensky Krasokorčuliarsky Zväz). It is held periodically as an event of the ISU Junior Grand Prix of Figure Skating (JGP), a series of international competitions exclusively for junior-level skaters. Medals may be awarded in men's singles, women's singles, pair skating, and ice dance. Skaters earn points based on their results at the qualifying competitions each season, and the top skaters or teams in each discipline are invited to then compete at the Junior Grand Prix of Figure Skating Final.

== History ==
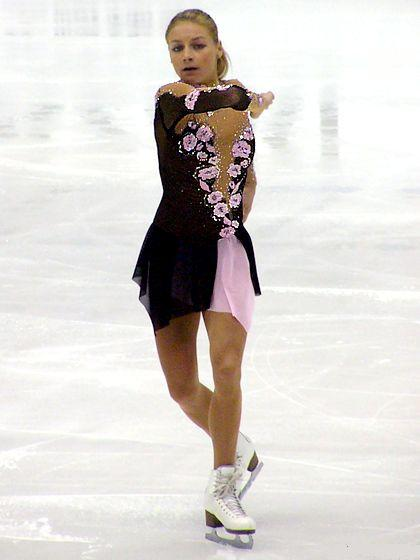
Viktoria Volchkova of Russia, the women's champion at the inaugural Junior Series competition in Slovakia

The ISU Junior Grand Prix of Figure Skating (JGP) was established by the International Skating Union (ISU) in 1997 and consists of a series of seven international figure skating competitions exclusively for junior-level skaters. The locations of the Junior Grand Prix events change every year. While all seven competitions feature the men's, women's, and ice dance events, only four competitions each season feature the pairs event. Skaters earn points based on their results each season, and the top skaters or teams in each discipline are then invited to compete at the Junior Grand Prix of Figure Skating Final.

Skaters are eligible to compete on the junior-level circuit if they are at least 13 years old before 1 July of the respective season, but not yet 19 (for single skaters), 21 (for men and women in ice dance and women in pair skating), or 23 (for men in pair skating). Competitors are chosen by their respective skating federations. The number of entries allotted to each ISU member nation in each discipline is determined by their results at the prior World Junior Figure Skating Championships.

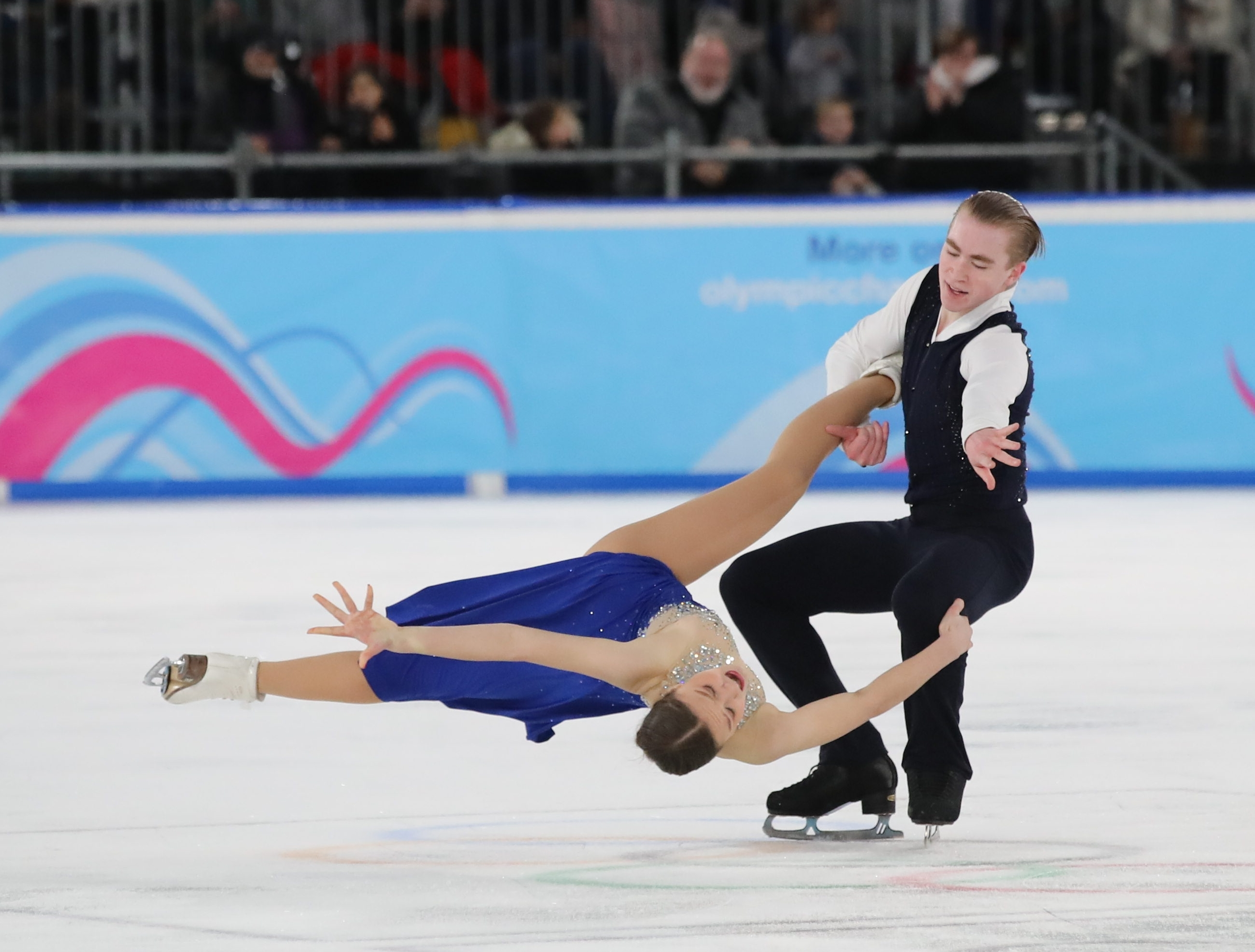
Natalie D'Alessandro and Bruce Waddell of Canada, the ice dance champions at the 2021 Junior Grand Prix competition in Slovakia

Slovakia hosted its first Junior Grand Prix event in 1997 in Banská Bystrica. Ivan Dinev of Bulgaria won the men's event, Viktoria Volchkova of Russia won the women's event, Victoria Maksyuta and Vladislav Zhovnirski of Russia won the pairs event, and Flavia Ottaviani and Massimo Scali of Italy won the ice dance event.

The International Skating Union officially cancelled all scheduled Junior Grand Prix events for the 2020–21 season, which included the competition in Košice, due to the COVID-19 pandemic, citing increased travel and entry requirements between countries and potentially excessive sanitary and health care costs for those hosting competitions. Slovakia has hosted this competition numerous times since 1997; the most recent event was in 2021.

== Medalists ==
=== Men's singles ===
In 2015, Denis Margalik became the first skater from Argentina to win a Junior Grand Prix medal.

Men's event medalists
| Year | Location | Gold | Silver | Bronze | Ref. |
|---|---|---|---|---|---|
| 1997 | Banská Bystrica | (Bulgaria) Ivan Dinev | (Russia) Pavel Kersha | (Slovakia) Juraj Sviatko | |
| 1998 | Banská Bystrica | (United States) Johnny Weir | (Czech Republic) Lukáš Rakowski | (United Kingdom) Matthew Davies | |
| 2002 | Bratislava | (Russia) Alexander Shubin | (Japan) Nobunari Oda | (France) Yannick Ponsero | |
| 2003 | Bratislava | (Russia) Andrei Griazev | (Japan) Nobunari Oda | (Canada) Christopher Mabee | |
| 2005 | Bratislava | (Russia) Alexander Uspenski | (United States) Stephen Carriere | (Germany) Philipp Tischendorf | |
| 2013 | Košice | (Japan) Keiji Tanaka | (China) Zhang He | (Russia) Mikhail Kolyada | |
| 2015 | Bratislava | (Canada) Roman Sadovsky | (United States) Vincent Zhou | (Argentina) Denis Margalik | |
| 2018 | Bratislava | (Canada) Stephen Gogolev | (Japan) Mitsuki Sumoto | (Italy) Daniel Grassl | |
| 2020 | Košice | Competition cancelled due to the COVID-19 pandemic | | | |
| 2021 | Košice | (Russia) Kirill Sarnovskiy | (Russia) Ilya Yablokov | (United States) William Annis | |

=== Women's singles ===
Women's event medalists
| Year | Location | Gold | Silver | Bronze | Ref. |
|---|---|---|---|---|---|
| 1997 | Banská Bystrica | (Russia) Viktoria Volchkova | (United States) Amber Corwin | (United States) Erin Pearl | |
| 1998 | Banská Bystrica | (Russia) Viktoria Volchkova | (Hungary) Tamara Dorofejev | (United States) Erin Pearl | |
| 2002 | Bratislava | (Sweden) Lina Johansson | (United States) Alissa Czisny | (United States) Natalie Mecher | |
| 2003 | Bratislava | (Japan) Mai Asada | (United States) Katy Taylor | (Russia) Olga Naidenova | |
| 2005 | Bratislava | (South Korea) Yuna Kim | (Japan) Aki Sawada | (Georgia (country)) Elene Gedevanishvili | |
| 2013 | Košice | (United States) Karen Chen | (Russia) Alexandra Proklova | (Japan) Riona Kato | |
| 2015 | Bratislava | (Russia) Polina Tsurskaya | (Japan) Mai Mihara | (United States) Vivian Le | |
| 2018 | Bratislava | (Russia) Anna Shcherbakova | (Russia) Anna Tarusina | (South Korea) You Young | |
| 2020 | Košice | Competition cancelled due to the COVID-19 pandemic | | | |
| 2021 | Košice | (Russia) Veronika Zhilina | (Russia) Sofia Muravieva | (Russia) Adeliia Petrosian | |

=== Pairs ===
Oksana Nagalati and Maxim Bobrov of Russia originally won the bronze medal at the 2013 competition, but were later disqualified due to a positive doping test from Nagalati.

In 2021, Karina Safina and Luka Berulava became the first pairs team from Georgia to win a Junior Grand Prix medal.

Pairs event medalists
| Year | Location | Gold | Silver | Bronze | Ref. |
|---|---|---|---|---|---|
| 1997 | Banská Bystrica | (Russia); Victoria Maksyuta; Vladislav Zhovnirski | (France); Sabrina Lefrançois; Nicolas Osseland | (United States); Carissa Guild; Andrew Muldoon | |
| 1998 | Banská Bystrica | (United States); Laura Handy; Paul Binnebose | (Canada); Jacinthe Larivière; Lenny Faustino | (Russia); Svetlana Nikolaeva; Alexei Sokolov | |
| 2002 | Bratislava | (Russia); Julia Karbovskaya; Sergei Slavnov | (Canada); Chantal Poirier; Jesse Sturdy | (United States); Tiffany Vise; Laureano Ibarra | |
| 2003 | Bratislava | (Russia); Tatiana Kokoreva; Egor Golovkin | (Russia); Anastasia Kuzmina; Stanislav Evdokimov | (United States); Amy Howerton; Steven Pottenger | |
| 2005 | Bratislava | (United States); Mariel Miller; Rockne Brubaker | (Russia); Valeria Simakova; Anton Tokarev | (Canada); Theresa Mailling; Dominique Welsh | |
| 2013 | Košice | (Russia); Maria Vigalova; Egor Zakroev | (Russia); Lina Fedorova; Maxim Miroshkin | (Russia); ~~Oksana Nagalati~~; ~~Maxim Bobrov~~; (DSQ) | |
| 2013 | Košice | (Russia); Maria Vigalova; Egor Zakroev | (Russia); Lina Fedorova; Maxim Miroshkin | (Italy); Alessandra Cernuschi; Filippo Ambrosini | |
| 2015 | Bratislava | No pairs competition | | | |
| 2018 | Bratislava | (Russia); Anastasia Mishina; Aleksandr Galliamov | (Russia); Apollinariia Panfilova; Dmitry Rylov | (Russia); Kseniia Akhanteva; Valerii Kolesov | |
| 2020 | Košice | Competition cancelled due to the COVID-19 pandemic | | | |
| 2021 | Košice | (Russia); Anastasia Mukhortova; Dmitry Evgenyev | (Georgia (country)); Karina Safina; Luka Berulava | (Russia); Polina Kostiukovich; Aleksei Briukhanov | |

=== Ice dance ===
Ice dance event medalists
| Year | Location | Gold | Silver | Bronze | Ref. |
|---|---|---|---|---|---|
| 1997 | Banská Bystrica | (Italy); Flavia Ottaviani; Massimo Scali | (Russia); Olga Pogosian; Alexandr Kirsanov | (Ukraine); Olga Kudym; Anton Tereschenko | |
| 1998 | Banská Bystrica | (Russia); Natalia Romaniuta; Daniil Barantsev | (Ukraine); Kristina Kobaladze; Oleg Voyko | (Germany); Jill Vernekohl; Jan Luggenhölscher | |
| 2002 | Bratislava | (Russia); Elena Romanovskaya; Alexander Grachev | (Ukraine); Anna Zadorozhniuk; Sergei Verbillo | (Canada); Siobhan Karam; Joshua McGrath | |
| 2003 | Bratislava | (Russia); Elena Romanovskaya; Alexander Grachev | (Ukraine); Anna Zadorozhniuk; Sergei Verbillo | (United States); Morgan Matthews; Maxim Zavozin | |
| 2005 | Bratislava | (Russia); Natalia Mikhailova; Arkadi Sergeev | (Italy); Anna Cappellini; Luca Lanotte | (United States); Trina Pratt; Todd Gilles | |
| 2013 | Košice | (Russia); Anna Yanovskaya; Sergey Mozgov | (United States); Rachel Parsons; Michael Parsons | (United States); Holly Moore; Daniel Klaber | |
| 2015 | Bratislava | (United States); Rachel Parsons; Michael Parsons | (Russia); Alla Loboda; Pavel Drozd | (Russia); Sofia Shevchenko; Igor Eremenko | |
| 2018 | Bratislava | (Russia); Elizaveta Khudaiberdieva; Nikita Nazarov | (Russia); Elizaveta Shanaeva; Devid Naryzhnyy | (United States); Eliana Gropman; Ian Somerville | |
| 2020 | Košice | Competition cancelled due to the COVID-19 pandemic | | | |
| 2021 | Košice | (Canada); Natalie D'Alessandro; Bruce Waddell | (Russia); Vasilisa Kaganovskaia; Valeriy Angelopol | (Russia); Sofya Tyutyunina; Alexander Shustitskiy | |
