= ISU Junior Grand Prix in Italy =

International figure skating competition

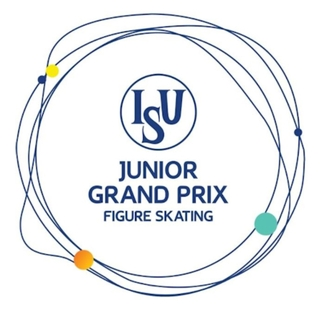
- Status: Active
- Genre: ISU Junior Grand Prix
- Frequency: Occasional
- Country: Italy
- Inaugurated: 2001
- Most recent: 2025
- Organizer: Italian Ice Sports Federation

The ISU Junior Grand Prix in Italy is an international figure skating competition sanctioned by the International Skating Union (ISU), organized and hosted by the Italian Ice Sports Federation (Italian: Federazione Italiana Sport del Ghiaccio). It is held periodically as an event of the ISU Junior Grand Prix of Figure Skating (JGP), a series of international competitions exclusively for junior-level skaters. Medals may be awarded in men's singles, women's singles, pair skating, and ice dance. Skaters earn points based on their results at the qualifying competitions each season, and the top skaters or teams in each discipline are invited to then compete at the Junior Grand Prix of Figure Skating Final.

== History ==
The ISU Junior Grand Prix of Figure Skating (JGP) was established by the International Skating Union (ISU) in 1997 and consists of a series of seven international figure skating competitions exclusively for junior-level skaters. The locations of the Junior Grand Prix events change every year. While all seven competitions feature the men's, women's, and ice dance events, only four competitions each season feature the pairs event. Skaters earn points based on their results each season, and the top skaters or teams in each discipline are then invited to compete at the Junior Grand Prix of Figure Skating Final.

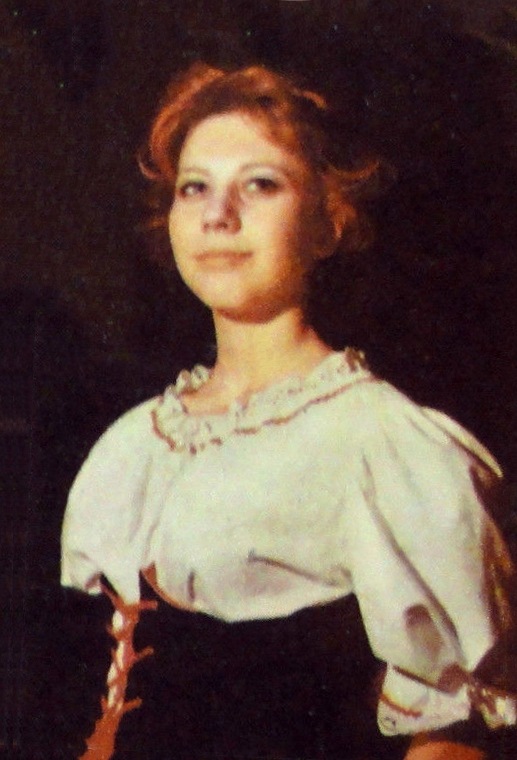
Italian skater Rita Trapanese, for whom the Rita Trapanese Trophy was named

Skaters are eligible to compete on the junior-level circuit if they are at least 13 years old before 1 July of the respective season, but not yet 19 (for single skaters), 21 (for men and women in ice dance and women in pair skating), or 23 (for men in pair skating). Competitors are chosen by their respective skating federations. The number of entries allotted to each ISU member nation in each discipline is determined by their results at the prior World Junior Figure Skating Championships.

Italy hosted its first Junior Grand Prix competition in Milan in 2001: the Rita Trapanese Trophy (Italian: Trofeo Rita Trapanese), named in honor of Rita Trapanese, the seven-time Italian national champion who represented Italy twice at the Winter Olympics. Stanislav Timchenko and Ludmila Nelidina, both of Russia, won the men's and women's events, respectively. Zhang Dan and Zhang Hao of China won the pairs event, and Elena Khaliavina and Maxim Shabalin of Russia won the ice dance event. The event has been held every few years in different cities: Milan (2001, 2002, 2011); Merano (2008); Egna (2017, 2019, 2022), and Varese (2025).

Italy hosted the 2022 Junior Grand Prix of Figure Skating Final – the culminating event of the Junior Grand Prix series – at the Torino Palavela in Turin. Nikolaj Memola of Italy won the men's event, Mao Shimada of Japan won the women's event, Anastasia Golubeva and Hektor Giotopoulos Moore of Australia won the pairs event, and Nadiia Bashynska and Peter Beaumont of Canada won the ice dance event.

== Medalists ==
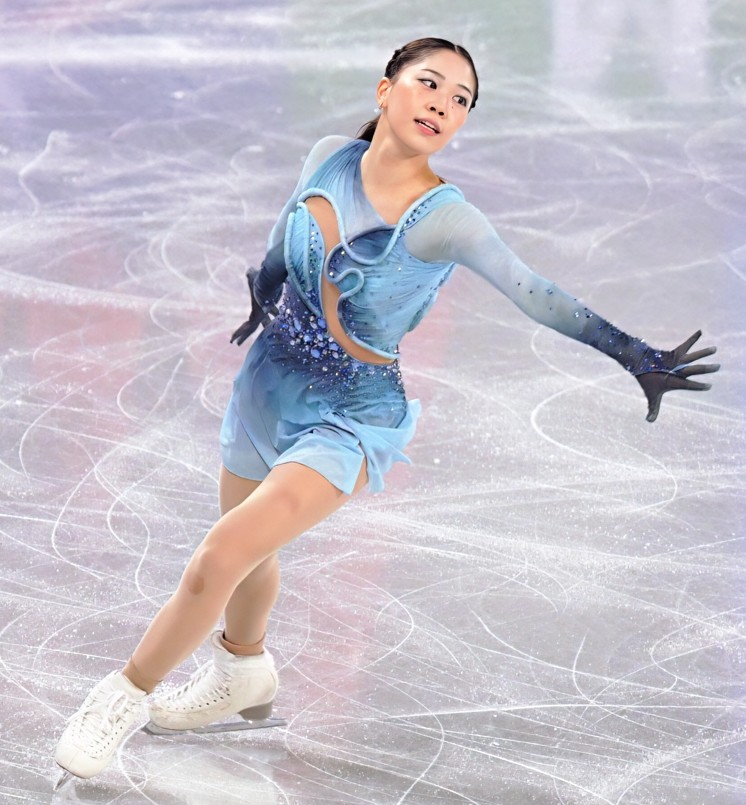
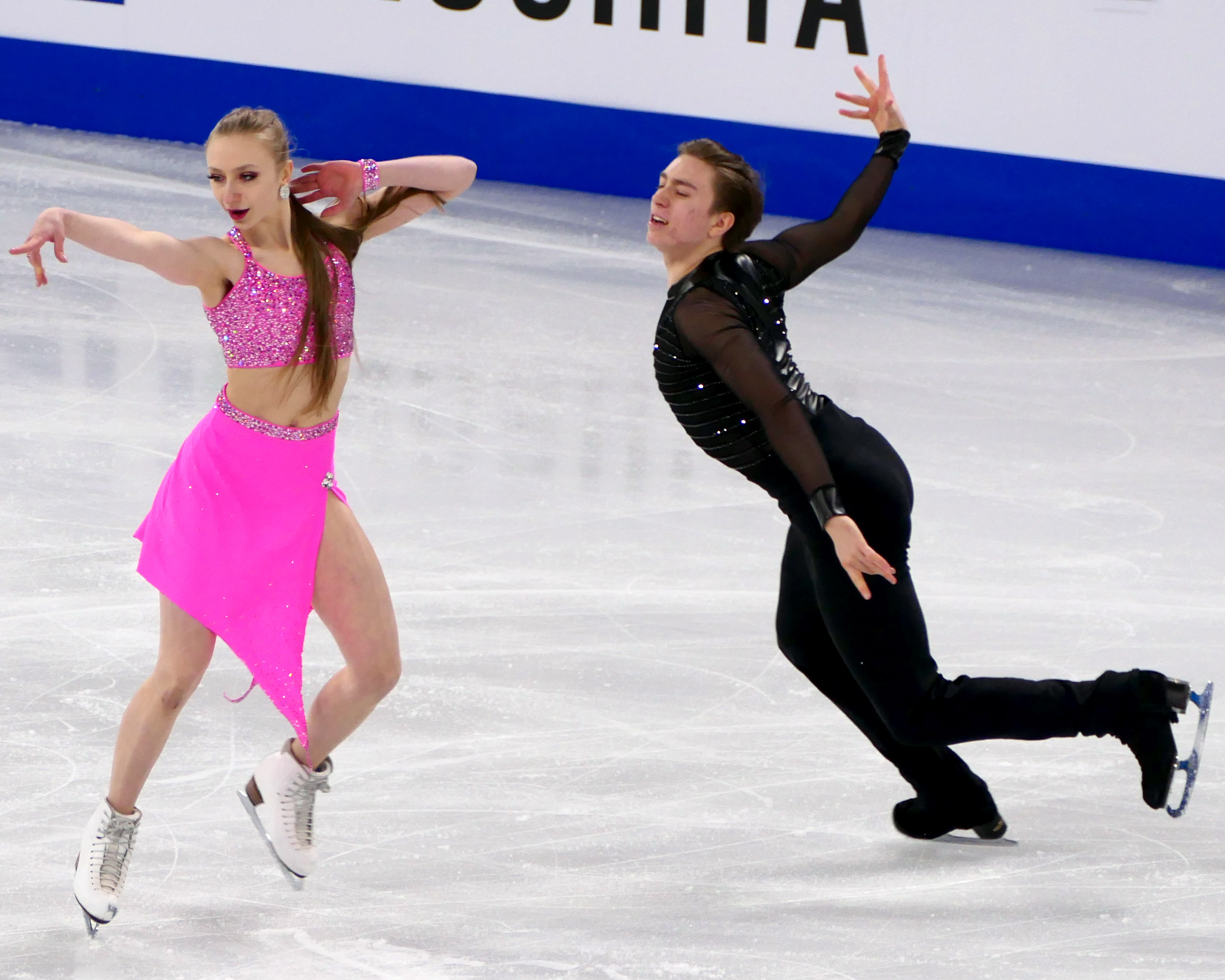
The 2022 Junior Grand Prix in Italy champions: Hana Yoshida of Japan (women's singles), and Kateřina Mrázková and Daniel Mrázek of the Czech Republic (ice dance)
Not pictured: Lucas Broussard of the United States (men's singles)

=== Men's singles ===
Men's event medalists
| Year | Location | Gold | Silver | Bronze | Ref. |
|---|---|---|---|---|---|
| 2001 | Milan | (Russia) Stanislav Timchenko | (Russia) Alexander Shubin | (China) Ma Xiaodong | |
| 2002 | Milan | (Russia) Sergei Dobrin | (United States) Parker Pennington | (Switzerland) Jamal Othman | |
| 2008 | Merano | (Czech Republic) Michal Březina | (United States) Curran Oi | (Russia) Alexander Nikolaev | |
| 2011 | Milan | (China) Han Yan | (United States) Jason Brown | (South Korea) Lee June-hyoung | |
| 2017 | Egna-Bolzano | (Italy) Matteo Rizzo | (Russia) Vladimir Samoilov | (United States) Tomoki Hiwatashi | |
| 2019 | Egna-Neumarkt | (Italy) Daniel Grassl | (Russia) Petr Gumennik | (Ukraine) Ivan Shmuratko | |
| 2022 | Egna-Neumarkt | (United States) Lucas Broussard | (Japan) Shunsuke Nakamura | (Japan) Takeru Amine Kataise | |
| 2022 Final | Turin | (Italy) Nikolaj Memola | (United States) Lucas Broussard | (Japan) Nozomu Yoshioka | |
| 2025 | Varese | (Japan) Taiga Nishino | (South Korea) Choi Ha-bin | (Japan) Shun Uemura | |

=== Women's singles ===
Women's event medalists
| Year | Location | Gold | Silver | Bronze | Ref. |
|---|---|---|---|---|---|
| 2001 | Milan | (Russia) Ludmila Nelidina | (Switzerland) Kimena Brog-Meier | (Canada) Joannie Rochette | |
| 2002 | Milan | (Japan) Yukina Ota | (Canada) Signe Ronka | (Hungary) Viktória Pavuk | |
| 2008 | Merano | (United States) Melissa Bulanhagui | (Japan) Rumi Suizu | (Germany) Sarah Hecken | |
| 2011 | Milan | (Russia) Yulia Lipnitskaya | (Russia) Anna Shershak | (United States) Hannah Miller | |
| 2017 | Egna-Bolzano | (Russia) Sofia Samodurova | (Russia) Alena Kostornaia | (Japan) Rika Kihira | |
| 2019 | Egna-Neumarkt | (Russia) Ksenia Sinitsyna | (Russia) Anna Frolova | (Italy) Alessia Tornaghi | |
| 2022 | Egna-Neumarkt | (Japan) Hana Yoshida | (South Korea) Kim Chae-yeon | (Georgia (country)) Inga Gurgenidze | |
| 2022 Final | Turin | (Japan) Mao Shimada | (South Korea) Shin Ji-a | (South Korea) Kim Chae-yeon | |
| 2025 | Varese | (Japan) Sumika Kanazawa | (South Korea) Youn Seo-jin | (China) Wang Yihan | |

=== Pairs ===
Pairs event medalists
| Year | Location | Gold | Silver | Bronze | Ref. |
|---|---|---|---|---|---|
| 2001 | Milan | (China); Zhang Dan; Zhang Hao | (Russia); Julia Karbovskaya; Sergei Slavnov | (China); Ding Yang; Ren Zhongfei | |
| 2002 | Milan | (Russia); Julia Karbovskaya; Sergei Slavnov | (United States); Jennifer Don; Jonathon Hunt | (Czech Republic); Veronika Havlíčková; Karel Štefl | |
| 2008 | Merano | No pairs competitions | | | |
| 2011 | Milan | No pairs competitions | | | |
| 2017 | Egna-Bolzano | No pairs competitions | | | |
| 2019 | Egna-Neumarkt | No pairs competitions | | | |
| 2022 | Egna-Neumarkt | No pairs competitions | | | |
| 2022 Final | Turin | (Australia); Anastasia Golubeva; Hektor Giotopoulos Moore | (United States); Sophia Baram; Daniel Tioumentsev | (United States); Cayla Smith; Andy Deng | |
| 2025 | Varese | No pairs competition | | | |

=== Ice dance ===
Ice dance event medalists
| Year | Location | Gold | Silver | Bronze | Ref. |
|---|---|---|---|---|---|
| 2001 | Milan | (Russia); Elena Khaliavina; Maxim Shabalin | (Hungary); Nóra Hoffmann; Attila Elek | (Italy); Alessia Aureli; Andrea Vaturi | |
| 2002 | Milan | (Italy); Alessia Aureli; Andrea Vaturi | (Russia); Elena Romanovskaya; Alexander Grachev | (Canada); Melissa Piperno; Liam Dougherty | |
| 2008 | Merano | (United States); Madison Chock; Greg Zuerlein | (Russia); Ekaterina Riazanova; Jonathan Guerreiro | (Italy); Lorenza Alessandrini; Simone Vaturi | |
| 2011 | Milan | (Russia); Alexandra Stepanova; Ivan Bukin | (Russia); Valeria Zenkova; Valerie Sinitsin | (United States); Lauri Bonacorsi; Travis Mager | |
| 2017 | Egna-Bolzano | (Russia); Arina Ushakova; Maxim Nekrasov | (Russia); Sofia Polishchuk; Alexander Vakhnov | (Canada); Alicia Fabbri; Claudio Pietrantonio | |
| 2019 | Egna-Neumarkt | (Russia); Elizaveta Khudaiberdieva; Andrey Filatov | (Canada); Natalie D'Alessandro; Bruce Waddell | (Russia); Angelina Lazareva; Maxim Prokofiev | |
| 2022 | Egna-Neumarkt | (Czech Republic); Kateřina Mrázková; Daniel Mrázek | (South Korea); Hannah Lim; Ye Quan | (United States); Leah Neset; Artem Markelov | |
| 2022 Final | Turin | (Canada); Nadiia Bashynska; Peter Beaumont | (South Korea); Hannah Lim; Ye Quan | (Czech Republic); Kateřina Mrázková; Daniel Mrázek | |
| 2025 | Varese | (United States); Jasmine Robertson; Chase Rohner | (France); Ambre Perrier Gianesini; Samuel Blanc Klaperman | (Canada); Summer Homick; Nicholas Buelow | |
