= Olga Naidenova =

Russian figure skater

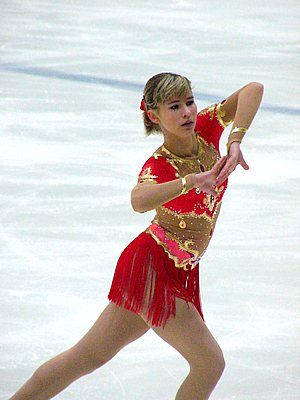
- Naidenova in 2004.

Personal information
- Native name: Ольга Владимировна Найдёнова
- Full name: Olga Vladimirovna Naidenova
- Born: 8 December 1987 (age 38) Moscow, Russian SFSR, Soviet Union
- Height: 1.60 m (5 ft 3 in)

Figure skating career
- Country: Russia
- Skating club: Trade Union Moscow
- Began skating: 1991
- Retired: 2008

Olga Vladimirovna Naidenova (Russian: Ольга Владимировна Найдёнова; born 8 December 1987) is a Russian former competitive figure skater. She is the 2003 Nebelhorn Trophy bronze medalist and won three ISU Junior Grand Prix medals, including gold at the 2002 Pokal der Blauen Schwerter. She was selected to compete at the 2003 World Junior Championships, where she placed 15th, and qualified for the 2004 ISU Junior Grand Prix Final, where she placed 7th.

== Programs ==
Season	Short program	Free skating
2003–04	Adagio by Rolf Løvland, Secret Garden	Samba en Preludio by Juan Gabriel
2002–03	Secret Garden	Don Quixote by Ludwig Minkus

== Competitive highlights ==
JGP: Junior Grand Prix

International
Event	02–03	03–04	04–05	05–06	06–07	07–08
Crystal Skate				4th		
Nebelhorn Trophy		3rd				
Universiade			6th		16th	
International: Junior
Junior Worlds	15th					
JGP Final		7th				
JGP China			4th			
JGP Czech Republic		2nd				
JGP France	6th					
JGP Germany	1st		8th			
JGP Slovakia		3rd				
EYOF	4th					
National
Russian Champ.	6th	7th	6th	4th	10th	3rd
Russian Jr. Champ.	2nd	3rd	3rd	5th		
