= Russian Junior Figure Skating Championships =

Annual figure skating competition

The Russian Junior Figure Skating Championships (Russian: Первенство России по фигурному катанию среди юниоров) are organized annually by the Figure Skating Federation of Russia to determine the country's junior-level national champions. The competition is held generally at the end of January or the beginning of February. Medals are awarded in four disciplines: men's singles, ladies' singles, pair skating, and ice dancing. The results are among the qualifying criteria for the World Junior Figure Skating Championships.

== Medalists ==
=== Men's singles ===
Men's event medalists
Year	Location	Gold	Silver	Bronze	Ref.
2000	Moscow	Ilia Klimkin	Denis Balandin	Andrei Lezin	
2001	Moscow	Sergei Dobrin	Alexander Shubin	Anton Smirnov	
2002	Kazan	Stanislav Timchenko	Andrei Griazev	Alexander Shubin	
2003	Odintsovo	Alexander Shubin	Sergei Dobrin	Andrei Lutai	
2004	Kazan	Andrei Griazev	Sergei Dobrin	Denis Leushin	
2005	Odintsovo	Alexander Uspenski	Sergei Voronov	Sergei Dobrin	
2006	Nizhny Novgorod	Alexander Uspenski	Sergei Voronov	Artur Gachinski	
2007	Samara	Sergei Voronov	Artem Borodulin	Daniil Gleikhengauz	
2008	Rostov-on-Don	Ivan Bariev	Nikita Mikhailov	Vladimir Uspenski	
2009	Saransk	Ivan Bariev	Artur Gachinski	Artem Grigoriev	
2010	Saransk	Artur Gachinski	Artur Dmitriev Jr.	Mark Shakhmatov	
2011	Kazan	Artur Dmitriev Jr.	Zhan Bush	Gordei Gorshkov	
2012	Khimki	Zhan Bush	Artur Dmitriev Jr.	Maxim Kovtun	
2013	Saransk	Mikhail Kolyada	Alexander Samarin	Alexander Petrov	
2014	Saransk	Adian Pitkeev	Alexander Petrov	Moris Kvitelashvili	
2015	Yoshkar-Ola	Alexander Petrov	Alexander Samarin	Dmitri Aliev	
2016	Chelyabinsk	Dmitri Aliev	Alexander Samarin	Roman Savosin	
2017	Saint Petersburg	Dmitri Aliev	Alexander Petrov	Igor Efimchuk	
2018	Saransk	Alexey Erokhov	Roman Savosin	Artur Danielian	
2019	Perm	Daniil Samsonov	Petr Gumennik	Roman Savosin	
2020	Saransk	Daniil Samsonov	Petr Gumennik	Andrei Mozalev	
2021	Krasnoyarsk	Evgeni Semenenko	Aleksandr Golubev	Egor Rukhin	
2022	Saransk	Ilya Yablokov	Nikolai Ugozhaev	Artem Kovalev	
2023	Perm	Arseny Fedotov	Lev Lazarev	Grigory Fedorov	
2024	Saransk	Arseny Fedotov	Lev Lazarev	Ivan Ramzenkov	
2025	Saransk	Lev Lazarev	Arseny Fedotov	Makar Solodnikov	
2026	Saransk	Lev Lazarev	Arseny Fedotov	Gleb Kovtun	

=== Women's singles ===
Women's event medalists
Year	Location	Gold	Silver	Bronze	Ref.
2000	Moscow	Irina Tkatchuk	Natalia Ryzhova	Daria Timoshenko	
2001	Moscow	Kristina Oblasova	Svetlana Chernyshova	Irina Tkatchuk	
2002	Kazan	Kristina Oblasova	Tatiana Basova	Ludmila Nelidina	
2003	Odintsovo	Kristina Oblasova	Olga Naidenova	Alima Gershkovich	
2004	Kazan	Angelina Turenko	Alima Gershkovich	Olga Naidenova	
2005	Odintsovo	Veronika Kropotina	Lilia Biktagirova	Olga Naidenova	
2006	Nizhny Novgorod	Arina Martynova	Katarina Gerboldt	Valeria Vorobieva	
2007	Samara	Arina Martynova	Alena Leonova	Ksenia Doronina	
2008	Rostov-on-Don	Katarina Gerboldt	Alena Leonova	Polina Shelepen	
2009	Saransk	Adelina Sotnikova	Elizaveta Tuktamysheva	Oksana Gozeva	
2010	Saransk	Polina Agafonova	Anna Ovcharova	Polina Shelepen	
2011	Kazan	Elizaveta Tuktamysheva	Polina Shelepen	Rosa Sheveleva	
2012	Khimki	Yulia Lipnitskaya	Polina Shelepen	Elena Radionova	
2013	Saransk	Elena Radionova	Serafima Sakhanovich	Maria Sotskova	
2014	Saransk	Serafima Sakhanovich	Maria Sotskova	Alexandra Proklova	
2015	Yoshkar-Ola	Evgenia Medvedeva	Maria Sotskova	Serafima Sakhanovich	
2016	Chelyabinsk	Polina Tsurskaya	Maria Sotskova	Alisa Fedichkina	
2017	Saint Petersburg	Alina Zagitova	Stanislava Konstantinova	Polina Tsurskaya	
2018	Saransk	Alexandra Trusova	Alena Kostornaia	Stanislava Konstantinova	
2019	Perm	Alexandra Trusova	Alena Kostornaia	Anna Shcherbakova	
2020	Saransk	Kamila Valieva	Sofia Akateva	Daria Usacheva	
2021	Krasnoyarsk	Sofia Akateva	Adeliia Petrosian	Sofia Muravieva	
2022	Saransk	Sofia Akateva	Sofia Samodelkina	Sofia Muravieva	
2023	Perm	Alina Gorbacheva	Veronika Zhilina	Maria Gordeeva	
2024	Saransk	Margarita Bazyliuk	Alisa Dvoeglazova	Lidia Pleskachova	
2025	Saransk	Elena Kostyleva	Alisa Dvoeglazova	Sofia Dzepka	
2026	Saransk	Elena Kostyleva	Lidia Pleskachova	Victoria Streltsova	

=== Pairs ===
Pairs event medalists
Year	Location	Gold	Silver	Bronze	Ref.
2000	Moscow	Elena Riabchuk; Stanislav Zakharov	Julia Shapiro; Alexei Sokolov	Milica Brozović; Anton Nimenko	
2001	Moscow	Julia Karbovskaya; Sergei Slavnov	Elena Riabchuk; Stanislav Zakharov	Svetlana Nikolaeva; Pavel Lebedev	
2002	Kazan	Elena Riabchuk; Stanislav Zakharov	Julia Karbovskaya; Sergei Slavnov	Maria Mukhortova; Pavel Lebedev	
2003	Odintsovo	Tatiana Kokoreva; Egor Golovkin	Julia Karbovskaya; Sergei Slavnov	Maria Mukhortova; Pavel Lebedev	
2004	Kazan	Maria Mukhortova; Maxim Trankov	Natalia Shestakova; Pavel Lebedev	Tatiana Kokoreva; Egor Golovkin	
2005	Odintsovo	Elena Efaeva; Alexei Menshikov	Maria Mukhortova; Maxim Trankov	Tatiana Kokoreva; Egor Golovkin	
2006	Nizhny Novgorod	Ekaterina Vasilieva; Alexander Smirnov	Ksenia Krasilnikova; Konstantin Bezmaternikh	Valeria Simakova; Anton Tokarev	
2007	Samara	Ksenia Krasilnikova; Konstantin Bezmaternikh	Vera Bazarova; Yuri Larionov	Elizaveta Levshina; Konstantin Gavrin	
2008	Rostov-on-Don	Ksenia Krasilnikova; Konstantin Bezmaternikh	Lubov Iliushechkina; Nodari Maisuradze	Anastasia Martiusheva; Alexei Rogonov	
2009	Saransk	Anastasia Martiusheva; Alexei Rogonov	Ekaterina Sheremetieva; Mikhail Kuznetsov	Sabina Imaikina; Andrei Novoselov	
2010	Saransk	Ksenia Stolbova; Fedor Klimov	Tatiana Novik; Mikhail Kuznetsov	Anna Silaeva; Artur Minchuk	
2011	Kazan	Ksenia Stolbova; Fedor Klimov	Alexandra Vasilieva; Yuri Shevchuk	Kristina Astakhova; Nikita Bochkov	
2012	Khimki	Vasilisa Davankova; Andrei Deputat	Ekaterina Petaikina; Maxim Kurdyukov	Kamilla Gainetdinova; Ivan Bich	
2013	Saransk	Lina Fedorova; Maxim Miroshkin	Evgenia Tarasova; Vladimir Morozov	Kamilla Gainetdinova; Ivan Bich	
2014	Saransk	Evgenia Tarasova; Vladimir Morozov	Maria Vigalova; Egor Zakroev	Vasilisa Davankova; Andrei Deputat	
2015	Yoshkar-Ola	Maria Vigalova; Egor Zakroev	Lina Fedorova; Maxim Miroshkin	Anastasia Gubanova; Alexei Sintsov	
2016	Chelyabinsk	Anastasia Mishina; Vladislav Mirzoev	Amina Atakhanova; Ilia Spiridonov	Ekaterina Borisova; Dmitry Sopot	
2017	Saint Petersburg	Aleksandra Boikova; Dmitrii Kozlovskii	Amina Atakhanova; Ilia Spiridonov	Alina Ustimkina; Nikita Volodin	
2018	Saransk	Daria Pavliuchenko; Denis Khodykin	Anastasia Mishina; Aleksandr Galliamov	Polina Kostiukovich; Dmitrii Ialin	
2019	Perm	Anastasia Mishina; Aleksandr Galliamov	Polina Kostiukovich; Dmitrii Ialin	Apollinariia Panfilova; Dmitry Rylov	
2020	Saransk	Apollinariia Panfilova; Dmitry Rylov	Kseniia Akhanteva; Valerii Kolesov	Iuliia Artemeva; Mikhail Nazarychev	
2021	Krasnoyarsk	Iuliia Artemeva; Mikhail Nazarychev	Kseniia Akhanteva; Valerii Kolesov	Anastasia Mukhortova; Dmitry Evgenyev	
2022	Saransk	Natalia Khabibullina; Ilya Knyazhuk	Iuliia Artemeva; Mikhail Nazarychev	Ekaterina Chikmareva; Matvei Ianchenkov	
2023	Perm	Ekaterina Chikmareva; Matvei Ianchenkov	Iuliia Artemeva; Aleksei Briukhanov	Elizaveta Osokina; Artem Gritsaenko	
2024	Saransk	Anastasia Chernyshova; Vladislav Vilchik	Vlada Selivanova; Viktor Potapov	Alisa Blinnikova; Aleksei Karpov	
2025	Saransk	Polina Shesheleva; Egor Karnaukhov	Taisiia Shcherbinina; Artem Petrov	Zoya Kovyazina; Artemiy Mokhov	
2026	Saransk	Polina Shesheleva; Egor Karnaukhov	Polina Sazhina; Aleksei Belkin	Taiisia Guseva; Daniil Ovchinnikov	

=== Ice dance ===
Ice dance event medalists
Year	Location	Gold	Silver	Bronze	Ref.
2000	Moscow	Natalia Romaniuta; Daniil Barantsev	Svetlana Kulikova; Arseni Markov	Elena Khalyavina; Maxim Shabalin	
2001	Moscow	Natalia Romaniuta; Daniil Barantsev	Elena Khalyavina; Maxim Shabalin	Oksana Domnina; Maxim Bolotin	
2002	Kazan	Elena Khalyavina; Maxim Shabalin	Elena Romanovskaya; Alexander Grachev	Oksana Domnina; Maxim Bolotin	
2003	Odintsovo	Oksana Domnina; Maxim Shabalin	Elena Romanovskaya; Alexander Grachev	Natalia Mikhailova; Arkadi Sergeev	
2004	Kazan	Natalia Mikhailova; Arkadi Sergeev	Elena Romanovskaya; Alexander Grachev	Ekaterina Rubleva; Ivan Shefer	
2005	Odintsovo	Natalia Mikhailova; Arkadi Sergeev	Anastasia Gorshkova; Ilia Tkachenko	Anastasia Platonova; Andrei Maximishin	
2006	Nizhny Novgorod	Natalia Mikhailova; Arkadi Sergeev	Anastasia Gorshkova; Ilia Tkachenko	Anastasia Platonova; Andrei Maximishin	
2007	Samara	Ekaterina Bobrova; Dmitri Soloviev	Maria Monko; Ilia Tkachenko	Kristina Gorshkova; Vitali Butikov	
2008	Rostov-on-Don	Kristina Gorshkova; Vitali Butikov	Maria Monko; Ilia Tkachenko	Ekaterina Riazanova; Jonathan Guerreiro	
2009	Saransk	Ekaterina Riazanova; Jonathan Guerreiro	Ekaterina Pushkash; Dmitri Kiselev	Marina Antipova; Artem Kudashev	
2010	Saransk	Ksenia Monko; Kirill Khaliavin	Elena Ilinykh; Nikita Katsalapov	Ekaterina Pushkash; Jonathan Guerreiro	
2011	Kazan	Ksenia Monko; Kirill Khaliavin	Ekaterina Pushkash; Jonathan Guerreiro	Evgenia Kosigina; Nikolai Moroshkin	
2012	Khimki	Victoria Sinitsina; Ruslan Zhiganshin	Alexandra Stepanova; Ivan Bukin	Valeria Zenkova; Valerie Sinitsin	
2013	Saransk	Valeria Zenkova; Valerie Sinitsin	Evgenia Kosigina; Nikolai Moroshkin	Anna Yanovskaya; Sergey Mozgov	
2014	Saransk	Alexandra Stepanova; Ivan Bukin	Anna Yanovskaya; Sergey Mozgov	Betina Popova; Yuri Vlasenko	
2015	Yoshkar-Ola	Anna Yanovskaya; Sergey Mozgov	Betina Popova; Yuri Vlasenko	Sofia Evdokimova; Egor Bazin	
2016	Chelyabinsk	Alla Loboda; Pavel Drozd	Betina Popova; Yuri Vlasenko	Anastasia Shpilevaya; Grigory Smirnov	
2017	Saint Petersburg	Anastasia Shpilevaya; Grigory Smirnov	Alla Loboda; Pavel Drozd	Anastasia Skoptsova; Kirill Aleshin	
2018	Saransk	Anastasia Skoptsova; Kirill Aleshin	Sofia Shevchenko; Igor Eremenko	Arina Ushakova; Maxim Nekrasov	
2019	Perm	Sofia Shevchenko; Igor Eremenko	Arina Ushakova; Maxim Nekrasov	Elizaveta Khudaiberdieva; Nikita Nazarov	
2020	Saransk	Elizaveta Shanaeva; Devid Naryzhnyy	Arina Ushakova; Maxim Nekrasov	Diana Davis; Gleb Smolkin	
2021	Krasnoyarsk	Arina Ushakova; Maxim Nekrasov	Elizaveta Shanaeva; Devid Naryzhnyy	Irina Khavronina; Dario Cirisano	
2022	Saransk	Irina Khavronina; Dario Cirisano	Vasilisa Kaganovskaia; Valeriy Angelopol	Sofya Tyutyunina; Alexander Shustitskiy	
2023	Perm	Anna Shcherbakova; Egor Goncharov	Sofia Leontieva; Daniil Gorelkin	Ekaterina Rybakova; Ivan Makhnonosov	
2024	Saransk	Ekaterina Rybakova; Ivan Makhnonosov	Anna Kolomenskaya; Artem Frolov	Anna Shcherbakova; Egor Goncharov	
2025	Saransk	Vasilisa Grigoreva; Evgeni Artyushchenko	Elizaveta Maleina; Matvei Samokhin	Zoya Pestova; Sergei Lagutov	
2026	Saransk	Maria Fefelova; Artem Valov	Zoya Pestova; Sergei Lagutov	Elizaveta Maleina; Matvei Samokhin	

== See also ==
- Russian Figure Skating Championships
