= Basov =

Basov (Russian: Басов) and Basova (Басова; feminine) is a common Russian surname.

People with this surname include:

- Nikolay Basov (1922–2001), a Soviet physicist and educator
- Vladimir Basov (1923–1987), a Soviet actor, film director and screenwriter
- Tatiana Basova (b. 1984), Russian figure skater

== See also ==
- 3599 Basov, asteroid
