= Taiga Nishino =

Japanese figure skater (born 2008)

Personal information
- Native name: 西野 太翔
- Other names: Nishino Taiga
- Born: 16 October 2009 (age 17) Yokohama, Kanagawa Prefecture, Japan
- Home town: Yokohama
- Height: 1.66 m (5 ft 5 1/2 in)

Figure skating career
- Country: Japan
- Coach: Misao Sato; Akiko Sato
- Skating club: Seisa International High School Yokohama Kanagawa Figure Skating Club
- Began skating: 2014

Medal record
World Junior Championships
Bronze medal – third place	2026 Talinn	Singles

Taiga Nishino (西野 太翔, Nishino Taiga; born 16 October 2009) is a Japanese figure skater. He is the 2026 World Junior bronze medalist, a two-time ISU Junior Grand Prix medalist, and a two-time Japanese junior national medalist.

== Personal life ==
Nishino was born on 16 October 2009 in Yokohama, Kanagawa Prefecture, Japan.

He cites Yuzuru Hanyu and Yuma Kagiyama as his greatest skating influences. His hobbies include cooking, shopping and napping.

== Career ==
=== Early career ===
Nishino began skating at age five, inspired by his older sister and watching Yuzuru Hanyu's Parisienne Walkways short program at the 2014 Winter Olympics. His first coach was Eri Kikkawa.

Nishino debuted as a basic novice skater at the 2019–20 Japan Championships, winning the silver medal and winning bronze the following year.

During the 2021–22 season, Nishino moved up to the advanced novice level, winning silver at the 2021–22 Japan Championships. With that result, he was selected to compete at the Japan Junior Championships, where he finished in twenty-fifth place.

Prior to the 2022–23 season, Misao Sato became Nishino's new coach. He subsequently went on to win silver on the advanced novice level and finished twelfth on the junior level at the 2022–23 Japan Championships.

=== 2023–24 season: Junior international debut ===
Nishino made his junior international debut in August at the 2023 JGP Austria, where he finished in ninth place. A couple months later, he competed at the 2023–24 Japan Junior Championships, finishing fifth overall. Selected to compete on the senior level at the 2023–24 Japan Championships in December, Nishino placed thirtieth in the short program and did not advance to the free skate segment.

=== 2024–25 season ===
Nishino opened his season by finishing sixth at 2024 JGP Czech Republic. He went on to compete at the 2024–25 Japan Junior Championships, winning the bronze medal behind Rio Nakata and Sena Takahashi.

In December, Nishino competed at the 2024–25 Japan Championships, where he placed twelfth overall.

=== 2025–26 season: World Junior bronze ===
Nishino began his season by winning the gold medal at 2025 JGP Italy. During his free skate at the event, he successfully completed both a quadruple toe loop and a quadruple salchow, breaking his personal bests in both the free skate and combined total scores. He went on to compete at 2025 JGP Poland, winning the silver medal. With these results, Nishino qualified for the 2025–26 Junior Grand Prix Final.

In November, Nishino competed at the 2025–26 Japan Junior Championships, where he won the silver medal behind Rio Nakata.

The following month, he competed at the 2025–26 Junior Grand Prix Final in Nagoya, Japan, placing fifth overall. Two weeks later, Nishino competed on the senior level at the 2025–26 Japan Championships, finishing in eleventh place overall.

Selected to compete at the 2026 World Junior Championships in Tallinn, Estonia, Nishino placed fourth in the short program and second in the free skate to win the bronze medal overall behind Rio Nakata and Seo Min-kyu as well as scoring personal bests in all competition segments. "The good thing about this free skate was that I managed to skate a clean program and fight until the end. That was good," he said during a press conference following the event.

=== 2026-2027 season ===
Nishino starts out his season at the 2026 JGP Thailand where he singled out his planned triple axel in the short program placing him in 13th place.

== Programs ==
Season	Short program	Free skating	Exhibition
2026–2027	Piano Concerto In C Minor, 'Rhapsody In Blue' Part II by George Gershwin performed by Skhal Romance Symphony Ochestra choreo. by Misao Sato	The Four Seasons; Spring 2; Summer 3; Autumn 2; Winter 1 by Antonio Vivaldi performed by Max Richter, Daniel Hope, Raphael Alpermann, Konzerthaus Kammerorchester Berlin, & André de Ridder choreo. by Misha Ge	Hitokiri Battosai ~Killing Sword~ (from Rurouni Kenshin) by Naoki Satō
2025–2026	Such a Night by Elvis Presley performed by Michael Bublé choreo. by Misao Sato	Ludwig van Beethoven Medley; Moonlight Sonata (Epic Trailer Version); Symphony No. 5 (Epic Trailer Version); Für Elise (Epic Trailer Version) performed by Hidden Citizens choreo. by Misao Sato	Judas by Lady Gaga
2024–2025	Smile by Charlie Chaplin performed by Michael Bublé choreo. by Misao Sato	Earth Song by Amadeus Electric Quartet; Rock Me Amadeus by Falco performed by Amadeus Electric Quartet; Autumn Moon by Eternal Eclipse choreo. by Misao Sato	
2023–2024	I Want You Back by The Jackson 5 & The Corporation choreo. by Misao Sato	Eleanor Rigby by The Beatles performed by Cody Fry choreo. by Misao Sato; Carmina Burana by Carl Orff; O Fortuna performed by Gu Dian Da Shi; Primo Vere: Veris Leta Facies - Omnia Sol Temperat - Ecce Gratum performed by Gerda Hartmann, Kurt Prestel, Orquesta Sinfónica de Salzburgo Mozarteum, Richard Brunner, Rudolf Knoll, & Ernst Hinreiner choreo. by Misao Sato	
2022–2023	Stampede by Alexander Jean ft. Lindsey Stirling choreo. by Misao Sato	Believer by Imagine Dragons performed by Vesislava & One Voice Children's Choir choreo. by Misao Sato	
2021–2022	Caravan by Juan Tizol & Duke Ellington choreo. by Eri Kikkawa	The Phantom of the Opera by Andrew Lloyd Webber choreo. by Eri Kikkawa	

== Competitive highlights ==
- JGP – Event of the ISU Junior Grand Prix Series
- TBD – Assigned
- WD – Withdrew from competition

Competition placements at senior level
Season	2023–24	2024–25	2025–26
Japan Championships	30th	12th	11th

Competition placements at junior level
Season	2021–22	2022–23	2023–24	2024–25	2025–26	2026–27
World Junior Championships					3rd	
Junior Grand Prix Final					5th	
Japan Championships	25th	12th	5th	3rd	2nd	
JGP Austria			9th			
JGP Czech Republic				6th		
JGP Italy					1st	
JGP Poland					2nd	
JGP Slovenia						3rd
JGP Thailand						4th

== Detailed results ==
ISU personal best scores in the +5/-5 GOE System
Segment	Type	Score	Event
Total	TSS	241.23	2026 World Junior Championships
Short program	TSS	84.29	2026 JGP Slovenia
Short program	TES	48.14	2026 JGP Slovenia
Short program	PCS	37.23	2025 JGP Poland
Free skating	TSS	160.09	2026 World Junior Championships
Free skating	TES	87.06	2026 World Junior Championships
Free skating	PCS	73.76	2025 JGP Italy

=== Senior level ===
Results in the 2023–24 season
Date	Event	SP		FS		Total	
Date	Event	P	Score	P	Score	P	Score
Dec 20–24, 2023	2023–24 Japan Championships	30	50.77	—N/a	—N/a	30	50.77

Results in the 2024–25 season
Date	Event	SP		FS		Total	
Date	Event	P	Score	P	Score	P	Score
Dec 19–22, 2024	2024–25 Japan Championships	9	77.58	14	135.49	12	213.07

Results in the 2025–26 season
Date	Event	SP		FS		Total	
Date	Event	P	Score	P	Score	P	Score
Dec 18–21, 2025	2025–26 Japan Championships	17	70.18	8	140.93	11	211.11

=== Junior level ===
Results in the 2021–22 season
Date	Event	SP		FS		Total	
Date	Event	P	Score	P	Score	P	Score
Nov 19–21, 2021	2021–22 Japan Championships (Junior)	25	46.41	—N/a	—N/a	25	46.41

Results in the 2022–23 season
Date	Event	SP		FS		Total	
Date	Event	P	Score	P	Score	P	Score
Nov 25–27, 2022	2022–23 Japan Championships (Junior)	12	56.37	11	114.37	12	170.74

Results in the 2023–24 season
Date	Event	SP		FS		Total	
Date	Event	P	Score	P	Score	P	Score
Aug 30 – Sep 2, 2023	2023 JGP Austria	16	49.65	6	126.25	9	175.90
Nov 17–19, 2023	2023–24 Japan Championships (Junior)	8	63.52	3	132.19	5	195.71

Results in the 2024–25 season
Date	Event	SP		FS		Total	
Date	Event	P	Score	P	Score	P	Score
Sep 4–7, 2024	2024 JGP Czech Republic	2	77.20	6	123.03	6	200.23
Nov 15–17, 2024	2024–25 Japan Championships (Junior)	3	75.85	5	132.64	3	208.49

Results in the 2025–26 season
Date	Event	SP		FS		Total	
Date	Event	P	Score	P	Score	P	Score
Sep 3–6, 2025	2025 JGP Italy	2	75.97	1	157.53	1	233.50
Oct 1–4, 2025	2025 JGP Poland	1	78.81	3	140.54	2	219.35
Nov 22–24, 2025	2025–26 Japan Championships (Junior)	2	79.95	2	155.69	2	235.64
Dec 4–7, 2025	(Japan) 2025–26 Junior Grand Prix Final	6	64.01	5	138.59	5	202.60
Mar 3–8, 2026	(Estonia) 2026 World Junior Championships	4	81.14	2	160.09	3	241.23

Results in the 2026–27 season
Date	Event	SP		FS		Total	
Date	Event	P	Score	P	Score	P	Score
Sep 3–5, 2026	2026 JGP Thailand	13	59.09	3	150.69	4	209.78
Oct 1–3, 2026	2026 JGP Slovenia	2	84.29	3	142.99	3	227.28
