= Anna Zadorozhniuk =

Ukrainian ice dancer

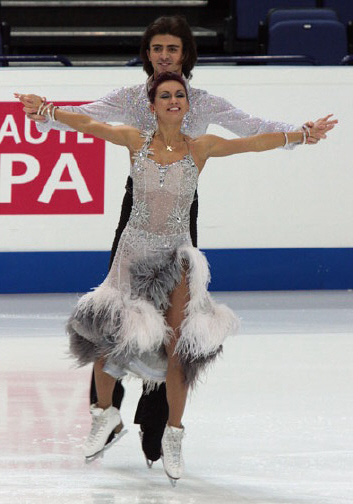
- Zadorozhniuk and Verbillo in 2009.

Personal information
- Full name: Anna Nikolayevna Zadorozhniuk
- Born: September 25, 1984 (age 42) Odessa, Ukrainian SSR, Soviet Union
- Height: 1.65 m (5 ft 5 in)

Figure skating career
- Country: Ukraine
- Began skating: 1988
- Retired: 2010

Anna Nikolayevna Zadorozhniuk (Ukrainian: Ганна Миколаївна Задорожнюк, born October 25, 1984) is a Ukrainian retired ice dancer. With partner Sergei Verbillo, she was the 2009 and 2010 Ukrainian national champion. Zadorozhniuk previously skated with Alexander Veselovski and Alexander Kudriavtsev. She married fellow figure skater, Roman Serov in 2011.

== Programs ==
(with Verbillo)

Season	Original dance	Free dance
2009–2010	Ukrainian folk dance: V Nochok; Hopak	Vivre Pour Le Meilleur by Johnny Halliday
2008–2009	Chicago soundtrack: Charleston: All that Jazz; Foxtrot: Razzle Dazzle; Charleston: All that Jazz	Carmen by Georges Bizet
2007–2008	Ukrainian folk dance: Hopak	Nostradamus by Maksim Mrvica
2006–2007	A Los Amigos by A. Pointer; Tus Ojos de Cielo by L. Adrover	Stella Errans from Dralion (Cirque du Soleil) by Violaine Corradi
2005–2006	Samba: Black Machine; Rhumba: You Are My Home; Samab: Tres Oases	The Mask of Zorro by James Horner
2004–2005	Slow foxtrot; Quickstep	Turn Around by Bonnie Tyler, Kareen Antonn
2003–2004	Blues: Bensonhurst Blues; Jive: Big Beat; Blues: Bensonhurst Blues by Oscar Benton	Storm (from Four Seasons) by Antonio Vivaldi performed by Vanessa-Mae
2002–2003	Waltz; Polka: Tritsch Tratsch Polka by Johann Strauss London Symphony Orchestra	Boogie and Blues by Brian Setzer and Orchestra

== Competitive highlights ==
(with Verbillo)

Results
International
Event	2000–01	2001–02	2002–03	2003–04	2004–05	2005–06	2006–07	2007–08	2008–09	2009–10
Olympics										16th
Worlds						21st	17th	18th	15th	WD
Europeans							10th	11th	7th	8th
GP Bompard					10th	10th				
GP Cup of China								6th	5th	4th
GP Cup of Russia								3rd	8th	
GP NHK Trophy						10th	6th			6th
Ondrej Nepela					1st					
Universiade					6th					
International: Junior
Junior Worlds		8th	15th	7th						
JGP Final		8th		5th						
JGP Czech				1st						
JGP Germany	8th									
JGP Italy			6th							
JGP Japan		5th								
JGP Slovakia			2nd	2nd						
JGP Sweden		2nd								
JGP Ukraine	7th									
EYOF			5th J.							
National
Ukrainian	7th J.	1st J.	2nd J.	1st J.	4th	3rd	2nd	2nd	1st	1st
GP = Grand Prix; JGP = Junior Grand Prix; J. = Junior level; WD = Withdrew
