= Ludmila Nelidina =

Russian figure skater

Personal information
- Born: 7 December 1984 (age 41) Moscow, Russian SFSR, Soviet Union
- Height: 1.62 m (5 ft 4 in)

Figure skating career
- Country: Russia (until 1998, 1999–2004); Azerbaijan (1998)
- Skating club: Sport Palace Olympiski
- Retired: 2004
Medal record
Figure skating: Ladies' singles
Representing Russia
Junior Grand Prix Final
Silver medal – second place	2001–02 Bled	Singles

Ludmila Nelidina (Russian: Людмила Нелидина; born 7 December 1984) is a Russian former competitive figure skater, who also competed internationally for Azerbaijan. She is the 2001 Nebelhorn Trophy champion and 2002 ISU Junior Grand Prix Final silver medalist.

== Career ==
Nelidina competed for Russia until 1998, when she briefly switched to competing for Azerbaijan. She switched back to skating for Russia the following year. Her highest placement at a senior-level ISU Championship was 13th at the 2003 World Championships. During her career, she was coached by Tatiana Pomerantseva, Zhanna Gromova, and Viktor Kudriavtsev.

Nelidina landed a triple Axel in competition at the 2002 Skate America. Together with Yukari Nakano, who also completed a triple Axel at that competition, Nelidina was the first female skater in 10 years to perform a triple Axel in international competition. She is the first female European skater to land a triple Axel in competition, the other skaters having been from Japan and the United States.

After retiring from competition, Nelidina began coaching in Moscow. She is currently on the faculty of coaches giving private skating lessons at the Wheaton Ice Arena in Maryland.

== Programs ==
Season	Short program	Free skating
2003–2004	Symphony No. 5 by Ludwig van Beethoven	Corcovado performed by Richard Clayderman; Abrazame by Julia Iglesias, Ferro Orchestra Raul di Blasio; Sentimental Medley by Rossini, Bach, Albinoni, Gounod performed by Richard Clayderman
2002–2003	The Last Opera by Saint-Preux	Corcovado performed by Richard Clayderman; Abrazame by Julia Iglesias, Ferro Orchestra Raul di Blasio; Sentimental Medley by Rossini, Bach, Albinoni, Gounod performed by Richard Clayderman
2001–2002	Music by Felix Mendelssohn	Ouverture (from La forza del destino) by Giuseppe Verdi

== Competitive highlights ==
International
Event	1999–00	2000–01	2001–02	2002–03	2003–04
World Championships				13th	
GP Cup of Russia				6th	10th
GP Skate America				5th	
Finlandia Trophy			5th		
Nebelhorn Trophy			1st	3rd	
International: Junior
JGP Final			2nd		
JGP Czech Republic	4th				
JGP Italy			1st		
JGP Netherlands			3rd		
JGP Slovenia					
National
Russian Championships		5th	6th	4th	
Russian Jr. Champ.			3rd		
GP = Grand Prix; JGP = Junior Grand Prix
