= Tatiana Basova =

Russian figure skater

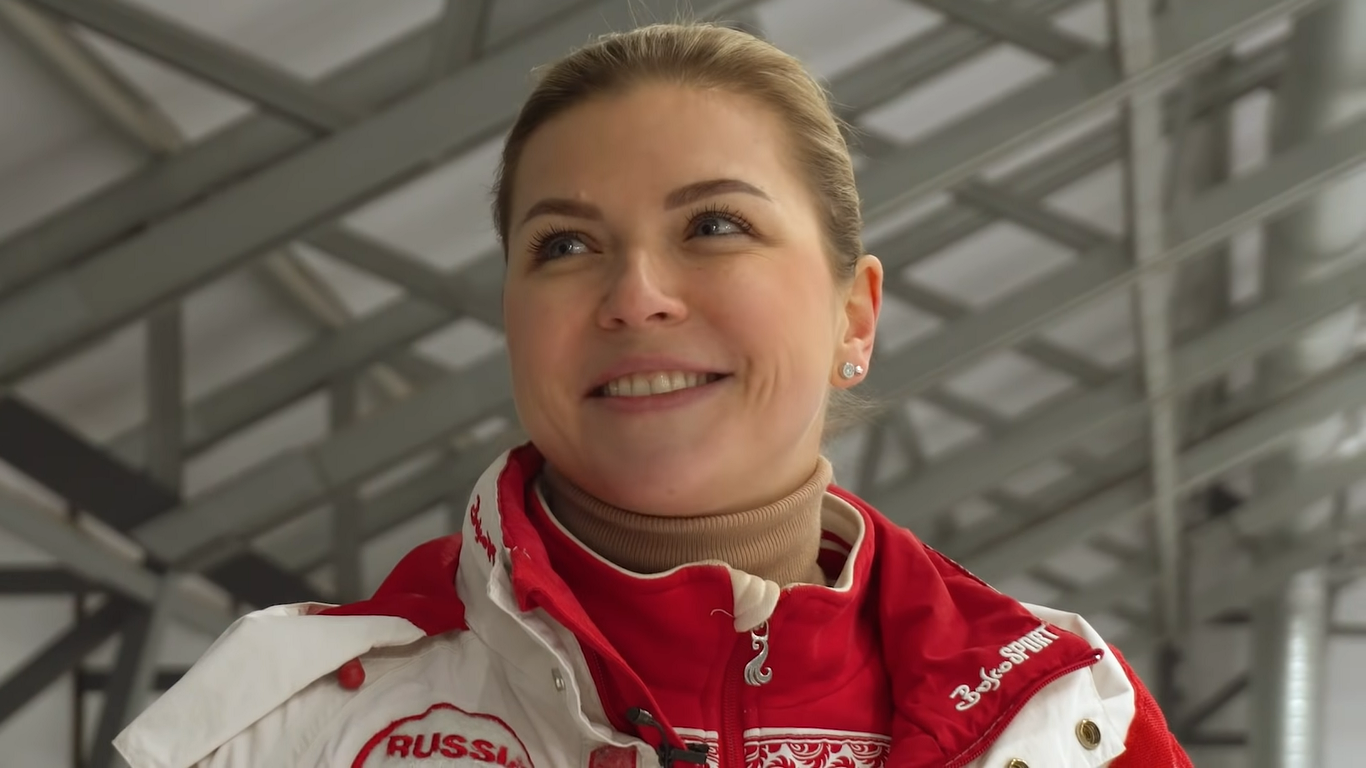

Personal information
- Full name: Tatiana Sergeyevna Basova
- Born: 24 June 1984 (age 42) Leningrad, Russian SFSR, Soviet Union
- Height: 1.72 m (5 ft 7 1/2 in)

Figure skating career
- Country: Russia
- Began skating: 1988
- Retired: 2006

Tatiana Sergeyevna Basova (Russian: Татьяна Сергеевна Басова, born 24 June 1984) is a Russian former competitive figure skater. She won silver medals at the Finlandia Trophy and International Cup of Nice and placed 18th at the 2004 European Championships. She was coached by Alexei Mishin.

== Programs ==
Season	Short program	Free skating
2004–05	Armenian folk music	Soundtracks by Ennio Morricone
2003–04	The Feeling Begins by Peter Gabriel	Amélie by Yann Tiersen; Santa Maria by Gotan Project
2001–02	Music by Yma Sumok	Malaguena

== Results ==
GP: Grand Prix; JGP: Junior Grand Prix

International
Event	00–01	01–02	02–03	03–04	04–05	05–06
European Champ.				18th		
GP Bompard					8th	
GP Cup of China				5th		
GP Cup of Russia					11th	10th
GP Skate Canada				8th		
Cup of Nice	2nd		2nd			
Finlandia Trophy			2nd		5th	
Universiade			5th			
International: Junior
World Junior Champ.		17th				
JGP Final		4th				
JGP Czech Republic	6th	2nd				
JGP Germany			7th			
JGP Italy			4th			
JGP Norway	3rd					
JGP Sweden		2nd				
National
Russian Champ.	9th	7th	3rd	5th	WD	8th
Russian Jr. Champ.		2nd				
WD = Withdrew
