= 2001–02 ISU Junior Grand Prix =

- Type: ISU Junior Grand Prix
- Season: 2001–02
- Previous: 2000–01 ISU Junior Grand Prix
- Next: 2002–03 ISU Junior Grand Prix

The 2001–02 ISU Junior Grand Prix was the fifth season of the ISU Junior Grand Prix, a series of international junior level competitions organized by the International Skating Union. It was the junior-level complement to the Grand Prix of Figure Skating, which was for senior-level skaters. Skaters competed in the disciplines of men's singles, ladies' singles, pair skating, and ice dance. The top skaters from the series met at the Junior Grand Prix Final.

== Competitions ==
The locations of the JGP events change yearly. In the 2001–02 season, the series was composed of the following events:

Date	Event	Location
September 13–16	2001 JGP Sofia Cup	Sofia, Bulgaria
September 20–23	2001 JGP Phoenix (cancelled)	Phoenix, Arizona, USA
September 27–30	2001 JGP Czech Skate	Ostrava, Czech Republic
October 11–14	2001 JGP Gdańsk	Gdańsk, Poland
October 25–28	2001 JGP The Hague	The Hague, Netherlands
November 1–4	2001 JGP Salchow Trophy	Malmö, Sweden
November 8–11	2001 JGP Trofeo Rita Trapanese	Milan, Italy
November 15–18	2001 JGP SBC Cup	Nagano, Japan
December 13–16	2001–02 Junior Grand Prix Final	Bled, Slovenia

== Series notes ==
Following the September 11, 2001 attacks, the United States Figure Skating Association cancelled the Junior Grand Prix event to be held in Arizona and did not allow their skaters to compete on the Junior Grand Prix for the rest of the season.

== Junior Grand Prix Final qualifiers ==
The following skaters qualified for the 2001–02 Junior Grand Prix Final, in order of qualification.

	Men	Ladies	Pairs	Ice dance
1	(Russia) Stanislav Timchenko	(Japan) Miki Ando	(China) Zhang Dan / Zhang Hao	(Russia) Elena Romanovskaya / Alexander Grachev
2	(Russia) Andrei Griazev	(Russia) Irina Tkatchuk	(Canada) Clara Montgomery / Ryan Arnold	(Russia) Elena Khaliavina / Maxim Shabalin
3	(Japan) Daisuke Takahashi	(Japan) Akiko Suzuki	(Russia) Julia Karbovskaya / Sergei Slavnov	(Ukraine) Julia Golovina / Oleg Voiko
4	(Belgium) Kevin van der Perren	(Russia) Ludmila Nelidina	(Russia) Julia Shapiro / Dmitri Khromin	(Russia) Oksana Domnina / Maxim Bolotine
5	(Canada) Shawn Sawyer	(Russia) Tatiana Basova	(Russia) Maria Mukhortova / Pavel Lebedev	(Germany) Miriam Steinel / Vladimir Tsvetkov
6	(China) Ma Xiaodong	(Japan) Yukina Ota	(Canada) Jessica Dubé / Samuel Tetrault	(Ukraine) Marina Kozlova / Sergei Baranov
7	(Finland) Ari-Pekka Nurmenkari	(Japan) Yukari Nakano	(China) Ding Yang / Ren Zongfei	(Hungary) Nóra Hoffmann / Attila Elek
8	(Switzerland) Jamal Othman	(Canada) Cynthia Phaneuf	(Ukraine) Tatiana Volosozhar / Petro Kharchenko	(France) Nathalie Péchalat / Fabian Bourzat
Alternates
1st	(France) Damien Djordievic	(Russia) Irina Nikolaeva	(Russia) Anastasia Kuzmina / Stanislav Evdokimov	(Ukraine) Anna Zadorozhniuk / Sergei Verbilo
2nd	(Italy) Karel Zelenka	(Switzerland) Kimena Brog-Meier	(Canada) Cathy Monette / Daniel Castello	(Germany) Christina Beier / William Beier
3rd	(Russia) Alexander Shubin	(Canada) Joannie Rochette	(Czech Republic) Veronika Havlíčková / Karel Štefl	(France) Amandine Borsi / Fabrice Blondel

Gregor Urbas was given the host wildcard spot to the Junior Grand Prix Final. He had finished three spots below third alternate position in overall qualification standings. He placed 8th out of 9 competitors at the Final.

== Medalists ==
=== Men ===
Competition	Gold	Silver	Bronze	Details
Bulgaria	(Canada) Shawn Sawyer	(Japan) Daisuke Takahashi	(United States) Shaun Rogers	
United States	Event cancelled			
Czech Rep.	(Russia) Andrei Griazev	(Belgium) Kevin van der Perren	(France) Damien Djordjevic	
Poland	(Russia) Stanislav Timchenko	(Italy) Karel Zelenka	(Russia) Alexander Uspenski	
Netherlands	(Belgium) Kevin van der Perren	(Switzerland) Jamal Othman	(Canada) Nicholas Young	
Sweden	(Russia) Andrei Griazev	(China) Ma Xiaodong	(Finland) Ari-Pekka Nurmenkari	
Italy	(Russia) Stanislav Timchenko	(Russia) Alexander Shubin	(China) Ma Xiaodong	
Japan	(Japan) Daisuke Takahashi	(Finland) Ari-Pekka Nurmenkari	(Canada) Shawn Sawyer	
Final	(Russia) Stanislav Timchenko	(China) Ma Xiaodong	(Belgium) Kevin van der Perren	

=== Ladies ===
Competition	Gold	Silver	Bronze	Details
Bulgaria	(Japan) Yukina Ota	(Russia) Olga Agapkina	(Japan) Yukari Nakano	
United States	Event cancelled			
Czech Rep.	(Japan) Miki Ando	(Russia) Tatiana Basova	(Japan) Akiko Suzuki	
Poland	(Russia) Irina Tkatchuk	(Ukraine) Svitlana Pilipenko	(Poland) Magdalena Leska	
Netherlands	(Canada) Cynthia Phaneuf	(Russia) Irina Nikolaeva	(Russia) Liudmila Nelidina	
Sweden	(Japan) Miki Ando	(Russia) Tatiana Basova	(Russia) Irina Tkachuk	
Italy	(Russia) Ludmila Nelidina	(Switzerland) Kimena Brog-Meier	(Canada) Joannie Rochette	
Japan	(Japan) Akiko Suzuki	(Japan) Yukari Nakano	(China) Fang Dan	
Final	(Japan) Miki Ando	(Russia) Ludmila Nelidina	(Japan) Akiko Suzuki	

=== Pairs ===
Competition	Gold	Silver	Bronze	Details
Bulgaria	(Russia) Julia Shapiro / Dmitri Khromin	(United States) Jacqueline Jimenez / Themistocles Leftheris	(Canada) Cathy Monette / Daniel Castelo	
United States	Event cancelled			
Czech Rep.	(Russia) Maria Mukhortova / Pavel Lebedev	(Russia) Anastasia Kuzmina / Stanislav Evdokimov	(Ukraine) Tatiana Volosozhar / Petr Kharchenko	
Poland	(Russia) Julia Karbovskaya / Sergei Slavnov	(Ukraine) Tatiana Volosozhar / Petr Kharchenko	(Canada) Cathy Monette / Daniel Castelo	
Netherlands	(Canada) Carla Montgomery / Ryan Arnold	(Russia) Julia Shapiro / Dmitri Khromin	(Canada) Jessica Dubé / Samuel Tetrault	
Sweden	(China) Zhang Dan / Zhang Hao	(China) Ding Yang / Ren Zhongfei	(Russia) Maria Mukhortova / Pavel Lebedev	
Italy	(China) Zhang Dan / Zhang Hao	(Russia) Julia Karbovskaya / Sergei Slavnov	(China) Ding Yang / Ren Zhongfei	
Japan	(Canada) Carla Montgomery / Ryan Arnold	(Canada) Jessica Dubé / Samuel Tetrault	–	
Final	(China) Zhang Dan / Zhang Hao	(Russia) Julia Karbovskaya / Sergei Slavnov	(China) Ding Yang / Ren Zhongfei	

=== Ice dance ===
Competition	Gold	Silver	Bronze	Details
Bulgaria	(Russia) Oksana Domnina / Maxim Bolotine	(Ukraine) Mariana Kozlova / Sergey Baranov	(Hungary) Nóra Hoffmann / Attila Elek	
United States	Event cancelled			
Czech Rep.	(Ukraine) Julia Golovina / Oleg Voiko	(Russia) Oksana Domnina / Maxim Bolotin	(France) Amandine Borsi / Fabrice Blondel	
Poland	(Russia) Elena Khaliavina / Maxim Shabalin	(Ukraine) Marina Kozlova / Sergei Baranov	(Germany) Christina Beier / William Beier	
Netherlands	(Russia) Elena Romanovskaya / Alexander Grachev	(Ukraine) Julia Golovina / Oleg Voiko	(Germany) Miriam Steinel / Vladimir Tsvetkov	
Sweden	(Russia) Elena Romanovskaya / Alexander Grachev	(Ukraine) Anna Zadorozhniuk / Sergei Verbillo	(France) Myriam Trividic / Yann Abback	
Italy	(Russia) Elena Khaliavina / Maxim Shabalin	(Hungary) Nóra Hoffmann / Attila Elek	(Italy) Alessia Aureli / Andrea Vaturi	
Japan	(Germany) Miriam Steinel / Vladimir Tsvetkov	(France) Nathalie Péchalat / Fabian Bourzat	(Russia) Daria Borisova / Alexandr Chepurnov	
Final	(Russia) Elena Khaliavina / Maxim Shabalin	(Russia) Elena Romanovskaya / Alexander Grachev	(Germany) Miriam Steinel / Vladimir Tsvetkov	

== Medals table ==
Rank	Nation	Gold	Silver	Bronze	Total
1	Russia (RUS)	16	12	5	33
2	Japan (JPN)	6	2	3	11
3	Canada (CAN)	4	1	6	11
4	China (CHN)	3	3	4	10
5	Ukraine (UKR)	1	6	1	8
6	Belgium (BEL)	1	1	1	3
7	Germany (GER)	1	0	3	4
8	Switzerland (SUI)	0	2	0	2
9	France (FRA)	0	1	3	4
10	Finland (FIN)	0	1	1	2
10	Hungary (HUN)	0	1	1	2
10	Italy (ITA)	0	1	1	2
10	United States (USA)	0	1	1	2
14	Poland (POL)	0	0	1	1
Totals (14 entries)		32	32	31	95
