= Ksenia Doronina =

Russian figure skater

Personal information
- Full name: Ksenia Sergeyevna Doronina
- Born: 20 October 1990 (age 35) Moscow, Russian SFSR, Soviet Union
- Height: 1.65 m (5 ft 5 in)

Figure skating career
- Country: Russia
- Skating club: Yubileyny Sport Club
Medal record
Russian Championships
Gold medal – first place	2007 Mytishchi	Ladies Singles
Gold medal – first place	2008 Saint Petersburg	Ladies Singles

Ksenia Sergeyevna Doronina (Russian: Ксения Серге́евна Доронина; born 20 October 1990 in Moscow) is a Russian figure skater, and two-time (2007 & 2008) Russian Champion. She competed for two seasons on the Junior Grand Prix circuit. Doronina missed the 2008–09 season due to mononucleosis.

== Programs ==
Season	Short program	Free skating
2007–08	Mr. and Mrs. Smith by John Powell; Kill Bill	Tale of Wandering by Alfred Schnittke
2006–07	Mr. and Mrs. Smith	Tale of Wandering by Alfred Schnittke
2004–05	Zoom by Safri Duo	Concerto of Sound Signals

== Competitive highlights ==
International
Event	04–05	05–06	06–07	07–08	08–09	09–10
World Champ.				17th		
European Champ.			28th	9th		
Cup of Nice				7th		11th
International: Junior
JGP Andorra		8th				
JGP Chinese Taipei			6th			
JGP Japan		13th				
National
Russian Champ.	7th	13th	1st	1st		13th
Russian Jr. Champ.			3rd			
JGP = Junior Grand Prix
