= Stanislav Timchenko =

Russian former competitive figure skater (born 1983)

Personal information
- Native name: Станислав Валерьевич Тимченко
- Full name: Stanislav Valeryevich Timchenko
- Born: 11 January 1983 (age 43) Moscow, Russian SFSR, Soviet Union
- Height: 1.73 m (5 ft 8 in)

Figure skating career
- Country: Russia
- Coach: Marina Selitskaia
- Skating club: Sport Palace Sokolniki
- Began skating: 1988
- Retired: 2004
Medal record
Representing Russia
Figure skating: Men's singles
World Junior Championships
Bronze medal – third place	2002 Hamar	Men's singles
Junior Grand Prix Final
Gold medal – first place	2001–02 Bled	Men's singles
Bronze medal – third place	2000–01 Ayr	Men's singles
European Youth Olympic Festival
Gold medal – first place	1999 Poprad-Tatry	Men's singles

Stanislav Valeryevich Timchenko (Russian: Станислав Валерьевич Тимченко, born 11 January 1983) is a Russian former competitive figure skater. He is the 2002 Skate Canada International bronze medalist, 2002 World Junior bronze medalist, and 2001 ISU Junior Grand Prix Final champion. He retired from competition in 2004 and performed with Igor Bobrin's Ice Miniature Theatre in 2008.

== Programs ==
Season	Short program	Free skating
2003–2004	Tango	Night on Bald Mountain by Modest Mussorgsky
2002–2003	Tango	Jesus Christ Superstar by Andrew Lloyd Webber The Royal Philharmonic Orchestra
2001–2002	Romeo and Juliet by Sergei Prokofiev	Jesus Christ Superstar by Andrew Lloyd Webber The Royal Philharmonic Orchestra
2000–2001	Boléro by Maurice Ravel	The Godfather by Nino Rota
1999–2000	Paganini	Eastern theme

== Results ==
GP: Grand Prix; JGP: Junior Grand Prix

International
Event	97–98	98–99	99–00	00–01	01–02	02–03	03–04
Worlds						12th	
Europeans						6th	
GP Skate America							8th
GP Skate Canada						3rd	10th
GP Cup of Russia						6th	
Finlandia Trophy							4th
Nepela Memorial					1st		
Schäfer Memorial						1st	
Universiade				5th			
International: Junior
Junior Worlds		12th			3rd		
JGP Final				3rd	1st		
JGP Germany				1st			
JGP Hungary		5th					
JGP Italy					1st		
JGP Netherlands			4th				
JGP Poland				3rd	1st		
JGP Sweden			7th				
JGP Ukraine		5th					
EYOF		1st					
National
Russian Champ.	9th	7th	8th	8th		3rd	
Russian Jr. Champ.			10th	5th	1st		
J. = Junior level
