= Ma Xiaodong =

Chinese figure skater

Personal information
- Born: October 10, 1982 (age 44) Harbin, China
- Height: 1.70 m (5 ft 7 in)

Figure skating career
- Country: China
- Skating club: Heilongjiang Skating Club
- Began skating: 1987
- Retired: 2006

Ma Xiaodong (Chinese: 马晓东, born October 10, 1982) is a Chinese former competitive figure skater. He is the 2000–01 Junior Grand Prix Final champion, 2003 Golden Spin of Zagreb champion, and 2002 Chinese national bronze medalist. He placed fourth at two World Junior Championships and in the top ten at three Four Continents Championships.

== Programs ==
Season	Short program	Free skating
2005–06	Music performed by Maksim Mrvica choreo. by Hailan Jian	Hidalgo by James Newton Howard choreo. by Wei Liu
2004–05	World Cup Symphony	The Voice of Enigma by Enigma
2003–04	World Cup Symphony	Con Air by Mark Mancina, Trevor Rabin
2002–03	Pearl Harbor by Hans Zimmer	Con Air by Mark Mancina, Trevor Rabin
2001–02	Pearl Harbor by Hans Zimmer	Jerry by Green
2000–01	Victory (Latin music) performed by the Russian National Orchestra	Mount Olympus by Rubiraji performed by the Hungary National Orchestra

== Competitive highlights ==
GP: Grand Prix; JGP: Junior Grand Prix

International
Event	98–99	99–00	00–01	01–02	02–03	03–04	04–05	05–06
Four Continents				6th		9th		8th
GP Bompard							4th	9th
GP Skate Canada					8th		9th	
Golden Spin						1st		
International: Junior
Junior Worlds	7th	12th	4th	4th				
JGP Final			1st	2nd				
JGP Canada		6th						
JGP China			1st					
JGP Italy				3rd				
JGP Japan		2nd						
JGP Norway			1st					
JGP Sweden				2nd				
National
Chinese Champ.	9th	8th	5th	3rd		6th	4th	
