= Julia Karbovskaya =

Russian pair skater (born 1986)

Personal information
- Born: 15 January 1986 (age 40) Leningrad, Russian SFSR, Soviet Union
- Height: 1.66 m (5 ft 5 1/2 in)

Figure skating career
- Country: Russia
- Skating club: Sdushor SKA, St. Petersburg
- Began skating: 1991
- Retired: 2003
Medal record
Representing Russia
Figure skating: Pairs
World Junior Championships
Silver medal – second place	2002 Hamar	Pairs
Junior Grand Prix Final
Silver medal – second place	2001–02 Bled	Pairs

Julia Karbovskaya (Russian: Юлия Карбовская; born 15 January 1986) is a Russian former pair skater. With former partner Sergei Slavnov, she is the 2002 World Junior silver medalist. They were coached by Nikolai Velikov at the Yubileyny rink in Saint Petersburg. Their partnership ended in 2003.

== Programs ==
(with Slavnov)

Season	Short program	Free skating
2001–2003	Tango by Raúl Di Blasio	Romeo and Juliet (1968 film) by Nino Rota
2000–2001	Kapitan (Russian film)	Karneval (Rondo Veneziano) by Reverberi

== Results ==
(with Slavnov)

Results
International
Event	2000–2001	2001–2002	2002–2003
GP Cup of Russia			8th
International: Junior
Junior Worlds	4th	2nd	5th
JGP Final		2nd	7th
JGP France	4th		
JGP Italy		2nd	1st
JGP Poland	1st	1st	
JGP Slovakia			1st
National
Russian Jr. Champ.	1st	2nd	2nd
GP = Grand Prix; JGP = Junior Grand Prix
