= Sergei Slavnov =

Russian pair skater (born 1982)

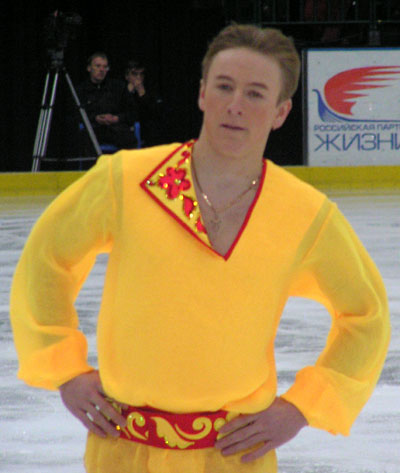
- Slavnov in 2005.

Personal information
- Full name: Sergei Gennadyevich Slavnov
- Born: 11 March 1982 (age 44) Leningrad, Russian SFSR, Soviet Union
- Height: 1.79 m (5 ft 10 in)

Figure skating career
- Country: Russia
- Began skating: 1987
- Retired: 2008
Medal record
Representing Russia (with Obertas)
Pairs' Figure skating
European Championships
Silver medal – second place	2005 Turin	Pairs
Representing Russia (with Karbovskaya)
World Junior Championships
Silver medal – second place	2002 Hamar	Pairs
Junior Grand Prix Final
Silver medal – second place	2001–02 Bled	Pairs

Sergei Gennadyevich Slavnov (Russian: Серге́й Геннадьевич Славнов; born 11 March 1982) is a Russian pair skater. He is best known for his partnership with Julia Obertas, with whom he competed from 2003 to 2007. Together, they are the 2005 European silver medalists. Previously, Slavnov competed with Julia Karbovskaya, with whom he is the 2002 World Junior silver medalist.

== Career ==
Sergei Slavnov began skating at age 5, originally as a single skater, and switched to pair skating at age 16. Slavnov originally skated with Julia Karbovskaya and won silver at the 2002 World Junior Championships. They were coached by Nikolai Velikov at the Yubileyny rink in Saint Petersburg.

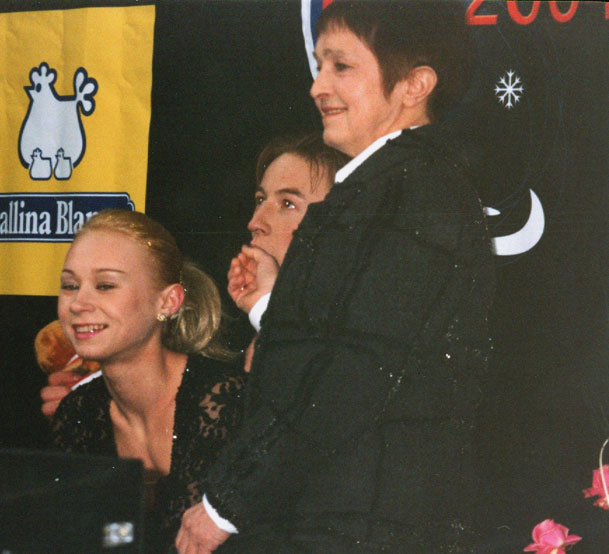
Obertas and Slavnov with coach Tamara Moskvina at the 2004 Russian Nationals

In 2002, Slavnov began dating Julia Obertas, who trained at the same rink, and in August 2003 they decided to skate together and to switch coaches to Tamara Moskvina, who also worked at Yubileyny.

At the 2004 Skate America, shortly after Tatiana Totmianina's accident, Obertas fell out of an overhead lift, a hand-to-hand lasso lift, but Slavnov managed to catch her to prevent her head hitting the ice. The pair won silver at the 2005 European Championships and were fifth at the World Championships. During the 2005–06 season, they were fourth at Europeans, and then finished eighth at both the Olympics and Worlds.

At the start of the 2006–07 season, Obertas / Slavnov decided to return to the Velikovs, with Ludmila Velikova as their main coach. The pair won bronze at 2006 Trophée Eric Bompard and finished 6th at 2006 NHK Trophy. At the 2007 Russian Championships, they won the silver medal and were sent to the 2007 European Championships where they finished 4th. They did not compete at Worlds.

The pair announced they would miss the 2007–08 season as the result of an injury to Obertas. In summer 2008, they said they would miss the start of the 2008–09 season, but might compete at Russian Nationals. In autumn 2008, Slavnov participated in the Russia 1 ice show Star Ice (Звёздный лёд), skating with the Russian actress Anastasia Zadorozhnaya. Obertas / Slavnov did not compete at Russian Nationals and ended their career.

Obertas / Slavnov performed some quadruple twists in competition.

Slavnov joined the Russian Ice Stars company in 2011.

== Programs ==
=== With Obertas ===
Season	Short program	Free skating	Exhibition
2006–2007	Libertango by Astor Piazzolla performed by Bond	Dark Angel; Virtuosi; Carmina Burana performed by Edvin Marton	
2005–2006	Concert for the Voice Andante from the Concerto for Coloratura Soprano and Orchestra, opus 82 written by Reinhold Glière performed by the Bolshoi Theatre Orchestra and Evgenia Miroshnichenko	Brindisi; Parigi o Cara; La Donna E Mobile; Anvil Chorus by Giuseppe Verdi	
2004–2005	Les Rois du Tsigane by Joska Nemeth and Paul Toscano	Katiusha Under Moscow Skies (Russian folk music); The Truman Show by Burkhard Dallwitz; Secret Garden by Rolf Løvland	Man With The Hex by The Atomic Fireballs
2003–2004	Esperanza by Maxime Rodriguez	The Truman Show by Burkhard Dallwitz; Secret Garden by Rolf Løvland	Not Gonna Get Us by t.A.T.u.

=== With Karbovskaya ===
Season	Short program	Free skating
2001–2003	Tango by Raúl Di Blasio	Romeo and Juliet (1968 film) by Nino Rota
2000–2001	Kapitan (Russian film)	Karneval (Rondo Veneziano) by Reverberi

== Results ==
=== With Obertas ===
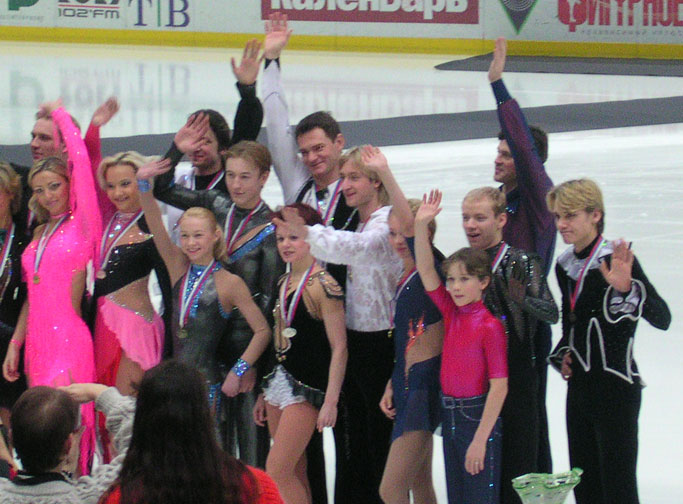
Obertas and Slavnov at the 2004 Russian Nationals

Results
International
Event	2003–04	2004–05	2005–06	2006–07
Olympics			8th	
Worlds	7th	5th	8th	
Europeans	4th	2nd	4th	4th
Grand Prix Final		4th	5th	
GP Bompard				3rd
GP Cup of Russia	5th	2nd	2nd	
GP NHK Trophy				6th
GP Skate America		2nd	3rd	
GP Skate Canada	6th			
Bofrost Cup	2nd			
National
Russian Champ.	3rd	3rd	2nd	2nd
GP = Grand Prix

=== With Karbovskaya ===
Results
International
Event	2000–2001	2001–2002	2002–2003
GP Cup of Russia			8th
International: Junior
Junior Worlds	4th	2nd	5th
JGP Final		2nd	7th
JGP France	4th		
JGP Italy		2nd	1st
JGP Poland	1st	1st	
JGP Slovakia			1st
National
Russian Jr. Champ.	1st	2nd	2nd
GP = Grand Prix; JGP = Junior Grand Prix
