= Julia Shapiro =

Russian-Israeli figure skater (born 1984)

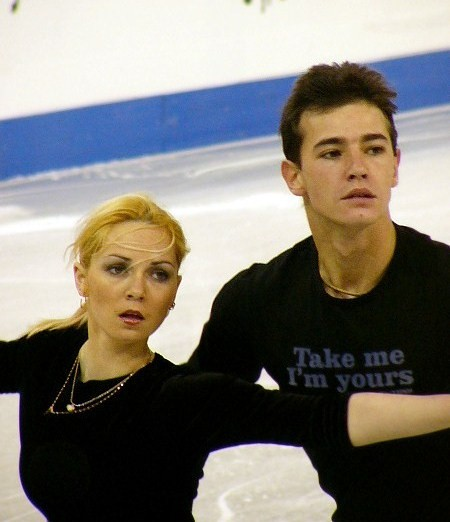
- Shapiro and Akolzin in 2004

Personal information
- Born: 16 December 1984 (age 41) Leningrad, Russian SFSR, Soviet Union
- Height: 1.50 m (4 ft 11 in)

Figure skating career
- Country: Israel (current); Russia (former)
- Began skating: 1989
- Retired: 2005
Medal record
Representing Russia
Figure skating: Pairs
World Junior Championships
Bronze medal – third place	2000 Oberstdorf	Pairs
Junior Grand Prix Final
Silver medal – second place	1999–2000 Gdańsk	Pairs

Julia Shapiro (Hebrew: יוליה שפירו, Russian: Юлия Шапиро; born 16 December 1984) is a former pair skater who competed for Russia and Israel. Early in her career, she represented Russia with Igor Petrov, Alexei Sokolov, and Dmitri Khromin. With Sokolov, she is the 2000 World Junior bronze medalist. From 2002 to 2005, Shapiro competed with Vadim Akolzin for Israel. They achieved their best ISU Championship result, tenth, at the 2005 European Championships.

== Programs ==
(with Akolzin)

Season	Short program	Free skating
2004–2005	Luna de Paris by Raul di Blasio	Underground Tango by Goran Bregovic

== Competitive highlights ==
=== With Akolzin for Israel ===
Results
International
Event	2002–03	2003–04	2004–05
World Champ.		16th	18th
European Champ.		15th	10th
GP Skate America			8th
GP Trophée Bompard			9th
Skate Israel		1st	
International: Junior
World Junior Champ.		13th	
JGP Poland		8th	
JGP Slovenia		8th	
National
Israeli Champ.	1st	1st	1st
JGP = Junior Grand Prix

=== With Khromin for Russia ===
International
Event	2000–01	2001–02
Cup of Russia	9th	
International: Junior
JGP Final		5th
JGP Bulgaria		1st
JGP Germany	3rd	
JGP Netherlands		2nd
JGP Poland	3rd	
National
Russian Junior Champ.	6th	4th
JGP = Junior Grand Prix

=== With Sokolov for Russia ===
International
Event	1999–2000
World Junior Champ.	3rd
JGP Final	2nd
JGP Czech Republic	1st
JGP Slovenia	1st
National
Russian Junior Champ.	2nd
JGP = Junior Grand Prix
