= Elena Dostatni =

Russian ice dancer

Elena Dostatni (Khalyavina)
Personal information
- Full name: Elena Lvovna Dostatni (since 2009)
- Other names: Elena Lvovna Khalyavina (competitive)
- Born: December 8, 1983 (age 42) Kirov, Russian SFSR, Soviet Union
- Height: 1.66 m (5 ft 5 in)

Figure skating career
- Skating club: Kirov FSC, Samara CSKVVS FSC
- Began skating: 1989
- Retired: 2002
Medal record
Representing Russia
Figure skating: Ice dancing
World Junior Championships
Silver medal – second place	2002 Hamar	Ice dancing
Bronze medal – third place	2001 Sofia	Ice dancing
Junior Grand Prix Final
Gold medal – first place	2001–02 Bled	Ice dancing
Silver medal – second place	2000–01 Ayr	Ice dancing

Elena Dostatni, née Khalyavina (Russian: Елена Достатни (Халявина), born December 8, 1983) is a former competitive ice dancer. Competing for Russia as Elena Khalyavina with partner Maxim Shabalin, she is three times Russian Junior National Championship medalist (bronze in 1999, silver in 2000 and gold in 2001) she won two medals at the ISU Junior Grand Prix Final (silver in 2000 and gold in 2001) and two medals at the World Junior Championships (bronze in 2001, silver in 2002).

== Career ==
Elena Khalyavina began skating when she was six years old in Kirov. She skated with Alexandr Glyhih for seven years through the senior level. In 1999, she moved to Samara and teamed up with Maxim Shabalin. In the 2001–02 season, Khalyavina/Shabalin won gold at the JGP Final, gold at the Russian Junior Championships, and silver at the World Junior Championships before parting ways. In 2002, she began her coaching career in her home town in Russia.

In 2011, Elena Dostatni became the director of ice dancing at the Colorado Springs World Arena Ice Hall. She started new ice dance school at the Broadmoor World Arena with a group of beginner skaters and raised up a new Colorado based generation of ice dancers. She is a coach of three times US Junior Ice Dance National Champions and a World Junior Champions 2024 in ice dance Leah Neset and Artem Markelov. 2

== Personal life ==
Elena Khalyavina moved to the United States in 2003 and is now known as Elena Dostatni. She married Polish former ice dancer and ISU Technical Specialist Andrzej Dostatni in September 2009. They have two sons.

== Programs ==
(with Shabalin)

Season	Original dance	Free dance
2001–2002	Paso doble; Flamenco; Paso doble	Romeo and Juliet by Nino Rota
2000–2001	My Guy; Dancing Fool	Anytime, Anywhere performed by Sarah Brightman

== Results ==
(with Shabalin)

Results
International
Event	1999–2000	2000–2001	2001–2002
World Junior Championships	10th	3rd	2nd
JGP Final		2nd	1st
JGP Czech Republic		1st	
JGP Italy			1st
JGP Norway	3rd	1st	
JGP Poland			1st
JGP Slovenia	1st		
National
Russian Junior Champ.	3rd	2nd	1st
JGP = Junior Grand Prix
