= ISU Junior Grand Prix of Figure Skating Final =

International figure skating competition

Junior Grand Prix of Figure Skating Final
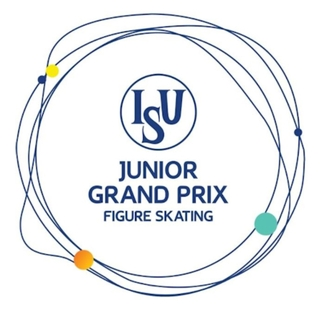
- Status: Active
- Genre: Junior Grand Prix event
- Frequency: Annual
- Inaugurated: 1997–98 Junior Series Final
- Previous event: 2025–26 Junior Grand Prix Final
- Next event: 2026–27 Junior Grand Prix Final
- Organizer: International Skating Union

The ISU Junior Grand Prix of Figure Skating Final is an international figure skating competition sanctioned by the International Skating Union (ISU). It is the final event of the ISU Junior Grand Prix of Figure Skating (JGP), a series of international competitions exclusively for junior-level skaters. Medals are awarded in men's singles, women's singles, pair skating, and ice dance. Skaters earn points based on their results at the qualifying competitions each season, and the top skaters or teams in each discipline are invited to then compete at the Junior Grand Prix of Figure Skating Final. Since 2008, the Junior Grand Prix of Figure Skating Final has been held concurrently with the senior-level Grand Prix of Figure Skating Final.

Mao Shimada of Japan currently holds the record for winning the most Junior Grand Prix Final titles in women's singles (with four). Three teams are tied for winning the most titles in pair skating (with two each): Julia Obertas and Dmytro Palamarchuk of Ukraine, Sui Wenjing and Han Cong of China, and Zhang Dan and Zhang Hao of China. Anastasia Mishina has also won two titles in pairs, but with two different partners. Two teams are tied for winning the most titles in ice dance: Ksenia Monko and Kirill Khaliavin of Russia and Anna Yanovskaya and Sergey Mozgov of Russia. Maxim Shabalin of Russia has also won two titles in ice dance, but with two different partners. No one skater holds the record in men's singles as there has been a unique champion each time the competition has been held.

== History ==
The ISU Junior Grand Prix of Figure Skating (JGP) was established by the International Skating Union (ISU) in 1997 and consists of a series of seven international figure skating competitions exclusively for junior-level skaters. The locations of the Junior Grand Prix events change every year. While all seven competitions feature the men's, women's, and ice dance events, only four competitions each season feature the pairs event. Skaters earn points based on their results each season, and the top skaters or teams in each discipline are then invited to compete at the Junior Grand Prix of Figure Skating Final.

Skaters are eligible to compete on the junior-level circuit if they are at least 13 years old before July 1 of the respective season, and if they have not yet turned 19 (for single skaters, and females in ice dance and pair skating) or 21 (for males in ice dance and pair skating). Competitors are chosen by their respective skating federations. The number of entries allotted to each ISU member nation in each discipline is determined by their results at the prior World Junior Figure Skating Championships.

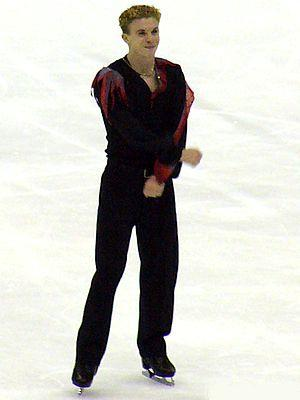
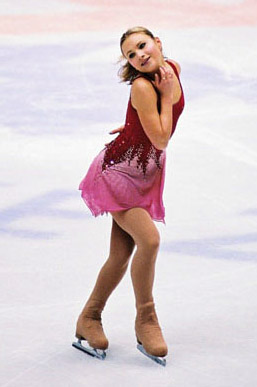
Timothy Goebel of the United States and Julia Soldatova of Russia, the men's and women's champions at the inaugural Junior Series Final in Lausanne, Switzerland

Switzerland hosted the very first Junior Grand Prix of Figure Skating Final, the culminating event of the Junior Grand Prix series, in 1997 in Lausanne. Timothy Goebel of the United States won the men's event, becoming the first skater in the world to successfully perform a quadruple Salchow jump in competition, as well as the first American skater to land a quadruple jump of any kind in competition. Julia Soldatova of Russia won the women's event, Julia Obertas and Dmytro Palamarchuk of Ukraine won the pairs event, and Federica Faiella and Luciano Milo of Italy won the ice dance event.

At the 2002 Junior Grand Prix Final, Miki Ando of Japan became the first woman to land a quadruple jump in competition (a quadruple Salchow). Beginning with the 2008–09 season, the Junior Grand Prix Final has been held concurrently with its senior-level complement, the Grand Prix of Figure Skating Final. China was scheduled to host the 2020 Junior Grand Prix Final in Beijing, but the ISU cancelled all scheduled Junior Grand Prix events for the 2020–21 season due to the COVID-19 pandemic. Likewise, the 2021 Junior Grand Prix Final, originally scheduled to be held in Osaka, was also cancelled; the situation with the Omicron variant restricted travel to Japan.

== Medalists ==
=== Men's singles ===
Men's event medalists
Season	Location	Gold	Silver	Bronze	Ref.
1997–98	(Switzerland) Lausanne	(United States) Timothy Goebel	(Bulgaria) Ivan Dinev	(United States) Matthew Savoie	
1998–99	(United States) Detroit	(France) Vincent Restencourt	(Russia) Ilia Klimkin	(Russia) Alexei Vasilevski	
1999–2000	(Poland) Gdańsk	(China) Gao Song	(Germany) Stefan Lindemann	(Canada) Fedor Andreev	
2000–01	(United Kingdom) Ayr	(China) Ma Xiaodong	(Russia) Sergei Dobrin	(Russia) Stanislav Timchenko	
2001–02	(Slovenia) Bled	(Russia) Stanislav Timchenko	(China) Ma Xiaodong	(Belgium) Kevin van der Perren	
2002–03	(Netherlands) The Hague	(Russia) Alexander Shubin	(Russia) Sergei Dobrin	(United States) Parker Pennington	
2003–04	(Sweden) Malmö	(United States) Evan Lysacek	(Russia) Andrei Griazev	(Canada) Christopher Mabee	
2004–05	(Finland) Helsinki	(United States) Dennis Phan	(Japan) Yasuharu Nanri	(Russia) Alexander Uspenski	
2005–06	(Czech Republic) Ostrava	(Japan) Takahiko Kozuka	(United States) Austin Kanallakan	(United States) Geoffrey Varner	
2006–07	(Bulgaria) Sofia	(United States) Stephen Carriere	(United States) Brandon Mroz	(Canada) Kevin Reynolds	
2007–08	(Poland) Gdańsk	(United States) Adam Rippon	(United States) Brandon Mroz	(United States) Armin Mahbanoozadeh	
2008–09	(South Korea) Goyang	(France) Florent Amodio	(United States) Armin Mahbanoozadeh	(United States) Richard Dornbush	
2009–10	(Japan) Tokyo	(Japan) Yuzuru Hanyu	(China) Song Nan	(United States) Ross Miner	
2010–11	(China) Beijing	(United States) Richard Dornbush	(China) Yan Han	(Canada) Andrei Rogozine	
2011–12	(Canada) Quebec City	(United States) Jason Brown	(China) Yan Han	(United States) Joshua Farris	
2012–13	(Russia) Sochi	(Russia) Maxim Kovtun	(United States) Joshua Farris	(Japan) Ryuju Hino	
2013–14	(Japan) Fukuoka	(China) Jin Boyang	(Russia) Adian Pitkeev	(United States) Nathan Chen	
2014–15	(Spain) Barcelona	(Japan) Shoma Uno	(Japan) Sōta Yamamoto	(Russia) Alexander Petrov	
2015–16	(Spain) Barcelona	(United States) Nathan Chen	(Russia) Dmitri Aliev	(Japan) Sōta Yamamoto	
2016–17	(France) Marseille	(Russia) Dmitri Aliev	(Russia) Alexander Samarin	(South Korea) Cha Jun-hwan	
2017–18	(Japan) Nagoya	(United States) Alexei Krasnozhon	(United States) Camden Pulkinen	(Japan) Mitsuki Sumoto	
2018–19	(Canada) Vancouver	(Canada) Stephen Gogolev	(Russia) Petr Gumennik	(Japan) Koshiro Shimada	
2019–20	(Italy) Turin	(Japan) Shun Sato	(Russia) Andrei Mozalev	(Russia) Daniil Samsonov	
2020–21	(China) Beijing	Competitions cancelled due to the COVID-19 pandemic			
2021–22	(Japan) Osaka	Competitions cancelled due to the COVID-19 pandemic			
2022–23	(Italy) Turin	(Italy) Nikolaj Memola	(United States) Lucas Broussard	(Japan) Nozomu Yoshioka	
2023–24	(China) Beijing	(Japan) Rio Nakata	(South Korea) Kim Hyun-gyeom	(Slovakia) Adam Hagara	
2024–25	(France) Grenoble	(United States) Jacob Sanchez	(South Korea) Seo Min-kyu	(Japan) Rio Nakata	
2025–26	(Japan) Nagoya	(South Korea) Seo Min-kyu	(Japan) Rio Nakata	(United States) Lucius Kazanecki	

=== Women's singles ===
Women's event medalists
Season	Location	Gold	Silver	Bronze	Ref.
1997–98	(Switzerland) Lausanne	(Russia) Julia Soldatova	(United States) Amber Corwin	(Russia) Elena Pingacheva	
1998–99	(United States) Detroit	(Russia) Viktoria Volchkova	(United States) Sarah Hughes	(Russia) Daria Timoshenko	
1999–2000	(Poland) Gdańsk	(United States) Deanna Stellato	(United States) Jennifer Kirk	(Russia) Svetlana Bukareva	
2000–01	(United Kingdom) Ayr	(United States) Ann Patrice McDonough	(Russia) Kristina Oblasova	(Japan) Yukari Nakano	
2001–02	(Slovenia) Bled	(Japan) Miki Ando	(Russia) Ludmila Nelidina	(Japan) Akiko Suzuki	
2002–03	(Netherlands) The Hague	(Japan) Yukina Ota	(Italy) Carolina Kostner	(Japan) Miki Ando	
2003–04	(Sweden) Malmö	(Japan) Miki Ando	(Sweden) Lina Johansson	(Hungary) Viktória Pavuk	
2004–05	(Finland) Helsinki	(Japan) Mao Asada	(South Korea) Yuna Kim	(United States) Kimmie Meissner	
2005–06	(Czech Republic) Ostrava	(South Korea) Yuna Kim	(Japan) Aki Sawada	(China) Xu Binshu	
2006–07	(Bulgaria) Sofia	(United States) Caroline Zhang	(United States) Ashley Wagner	(United States) Megan Oster	
2007–08	(Poland) Gdańsk	(United States) Mirai Nagasu	(United States) Rachael Flatt	(Japan) Yuki Nishino	
2008–09	(South Korea) Goyang	(United States) Becky Bereswill	(Japan) Yukiko Fujisawa	(United States) Alexe Gilles	
2009–10	(Japan) Tokyo	(Japan) Kanako Murakami	(Russia) Polina Shelepen	(United States) Christina Gao	
2010–11	(China) Beijing	(Russia) Adelina Sotnikova	(Russia) Elizaveta Tuktamysheva	(China) Li Zijun	
2011–12	(Canada) Quebec City	(Russia) Yulia Lipnitskaya	(Russia) Polina Shelepen	(Russia) Polina Korobeynikova	
2012–13	(Russia) Sochi	(Russia) Elena Radionova	(United States) Hannah Miller	(Russia) Anna Pogorilaya	
2013–14	(Japan) Fukuoka	(Russia) Maria Sotskova	(Russia) Serafima Sakhanovich	(Russia) Evgenia Medvedeva	
2014–15	(Spain) Barcelona	(Russia) Evgenia Medvedeva	(Russia) Serafima Sakhanovich	(Japan) Wakaba Higuchi	
2015–16	(Spain) Barcelona	(Russia) Polina Tsurskaya	(Russia) Maria Sotskova	(Japan) Marin Honda	
2016–17	(France) Marseille	(Russia) Alina Zagitova	(Russia) Anastasiia Gubanova	(Japan) Kaori Sakamoto	
2017–18	(Japan) Nagoya	(Russia) Alexandra Trusova	(Russia) Alena Kostornaia	(Russia) Anastasia Tarakanova	
2018–19	(Canada) Vancouver	(Russia) Alena Kostornaia	(Russia) Alexandra Trusova	(Russia) Alena Kanysheva	
2019–20	(Italy) Turin	(Russia) Kamila Valieva	(United States) Alysa Liu	(Russia) Daria Usacheva	
2020–21	(China) Beijing	Competitions cancelled due to the COVID-19 pandemic			
2021–22	(Japan) Osaka	Competitions cancelled due to the COVID-19 pandemic			
2022–23	(Italy) Turin	(Japan) Mao Shimada	(South Korea) Shin Ji-a	(South Korea) Kim Chae-yeon	
2023–24	(China) Beijing	(Japan) Mao Shimada	(South Korea) Shin Ji-a	(Japan) Rena Uezono	
2024–25	(France) Grenoble	(Japan) Mao Shimada	(Japan) Kaoruko Wada	(Japan) Ami Nakai	
2025–26	(Japan) Nagoya	(Japan) Mao Shimada	(South Korea) Kim Yu-seong	(Japan) Mei Okada	

=== Pairs ===
Pairs event medalists
Season	Location	Gold	Silver	Bronze	Ref.
1997–98	(Switzerland) Lausanne	(Ukraine); Julia Obertas; Dmytro Palamarchuk	(Russia); Victoria Maksyuta; Vladislav Zhovnirski	(United States); Natalie Vlandis; Jered Guzman	
1998–99	(United States) Detroit	(Ukraine); Julia Obertas; Dmytro Palamarchuk	(United States); Laura Handy; Paul Binnebose	(Russia); Victoria Maksyuta; Vladislav Zhovnirski	
1999–2000	(Poland) Gdańsk	(Ukraine); Aljona Savchenko; Stanislav Morozov	(Russia); Julia Shapiro; Alexei Sokolov	(Russia); Viktoria Shliakhova; Grigori Petrovski	
2000–01	(United Kingdom) Ayr	(China); Zhang Dan; Zhang Hao	(United States); Kristen Roth; Michael McPherson	(Japan); Yuko Kavaguti; Alexander Markuntsov	
2001–02	(Slovenia) Bled	(China); Zhang Dan; Zhang Hao	(Russia); Julia Karbovskaya; Sergei Slavnov	(China); Ding Yang; Ren Zhongfei	
2002–03	(Netherlands) The Hague	(China); Ding Yang; Ren Zhongfei	(Canada); Jessica Dubé; Samuel Tetrault	(United States); Jennifer Don; Jonathon Hunt	
2003–04	(Sweden) Malmö	(Canada); Jessica Dubé; Bryce Davison	(Russia); Natalia Shestakova; Pavel Lebedev	(Russia); Maria Mukhortova; Maxim Trankov	
2004–05	(Finland) Helsinki	(Russia); Maria Mukhortova; Maxim Trankov	(United States); Brittany Vise; Nicholas Kole	(United States); Mariel Miller; Rockne Brubaker	
2005–06	(Czech Republic) Ostrava	(Russia); Valeria Simakova; Anton Tokarev	(United States); Julia Vlassov; Drew Meekins	(United States); Mariel Miller; Rockne Brubaker	
2006–07	(Bulgaria) Sofia	(United States); Keauna McLaughlin; Rockne Brubaker	(Russia); Ksenia Krasilnikova; Konstantin Bezmaternikh	(United States); Jessica Rose Paetsch; Jon Nuss	
2007–08	(Poland) Gdańsk	(Russia); Vera Bazarova; Yuri Larionov; (Note: Vera Bazarova and Yuri Larionov of Russia originally won the gold medal at the 2007 Junior Grand Prix Final, but were later disqualified due to a positive doping test from Larionov.)	(Russia); Ekaterina Sheremetieva; Mikhail Kuznetsov	(United States); Jessica Rose Paetsch; Jon Nuss	
2007–08	(Poland) Gdańsk	(Russia); Ksenia Krasilnikova; Konstantin Bezmaternikh	(Russia); Ekaterina Sheremetieva; Mikhail Kuznetsov	(United States); Jessica Rose Paetsch; Jon Nuss	
2008–09	(South Korea) Goyang	(Russia); Liubov Ilyushechkina; Nodari Maisuradze	(China); Zhang Yue; Wang Lei	(Russia); Ksenia Krasilnikova; Konstantin Bezmaternikh	
2009–10	(Japan) Tokyo	(China); Sui Wenjing; Han Cong	(Japan); Narumi Takahashi; Mervin Tran	(China); Zhang Yue; Wang Lei	
2010–11	(China) Beijing	(Japan); Narumi Takahashi; Mervin Tran	(Russia); Ksenia Stolbova; Fedor Klimov	(China); Yu Xiaoyu; Jin Yang	
2011–12	(Canada) Quebec City	(China); Sui Wenjing; Han Cong	(Canada); Katherine Bobak; Ian Beharry	(United States); Britney Simpson; Matthew Blackmer	
2012–13	(Russia) Sochi	(Russia); Lina Fedorova; Maxim Miroshkin	(Russia); Vasilisa Davankova; Andrei Deputat	(Russia); Maria Vigalova; Egor Zakroev	
2013–14	(Japan) Fukuoka	(China); Yu Xiaoyu; Jin Yang	(Russia); Maria Vigalova; Egor Zakroev	(Russia); Lina Fedorova; Maxim Miroshkin	
2014–15	(Spain) Barcelona	(Canada); Julianne Séguin; Charlie Bilodeau	(Russia); Lina Fedorova; Maxim Miroshkin	(Russia); Maria Vigalova; Egor Zakroev	
2015–16	(Spain) Barcelona	(Russia); Ekaterina Borisova; Dmitry Sopot	(Czech Republic); Anna Dušková; Martin Bidař	(Russia); Amina Atakhanova; Ilia Spiridonov	
2016–17	(France) Marseille	(Russia); Anastasia Mishina; Vladislav Mirzoev	(Czech Republic); Anna Dušková; Martin Bidař	(Russia); Aleksandra Boikova; Dmitrii Kozlovskii	
2017–18	(Japan) Nagoya	(Australia); Ekaterina Alexandrovskaya; Harley Windsor	(Russia); Apollinariia Panfilova; Dmitry Rylov	(Russia); Daria Pavliuchenko; Denis Khodykin	
2018–19	(Canada) Vancouver	(Russia); Anastasia Mishina; Aleksandr Galliamov	(Russia); Polina Kostiukovich; Dmitrii Ialin	(Russia); Apollinariia Panfilova; Dmitry Rylov	
2019–20	(Italy) Turin	(Russia); Apollinariia Panfilova; Dmitry Rylov	(Russia); Diana Mukhametzianova; Ilya Mironov	(Russia); Kseniia Akhanteva; Valerii Kolesov	
2020–21	(China) Beijing	Competitions cancelled due to the COVID-19 pandemic			
2021–22	(Japan) Osaka	Competitions cancelled due to the COVID-19 pandemic			
2022–23	(Italy) Turin	(Australia); Anastasia Golubeva; Hektor Giotopoulos Moore	(United States); Sophia Baram; Daniel Tioumentsev	(United States); Cayla Smith; Andy Deng	
2023–24	(China) Beijing	(Georgia (country)); Anastasiia Metelkina; Luka Berulava	(Canada); Ava Kemp; Yohnatan Elizarov	(Canada); Jazmine Desrochers; Kieran Thrasher	
2024–25	(France) Grenoble	(China); Zhang Jiaxuan; Huang Yihang	(United States); Olivia Flores; Luke Wang	(Canada); Jazmine Desrochers; Kieran Thrasher	
2025–26	(Japan) Nagoya	(China); Guo Rui; Zhang Yiwen	(China); Zhang Xuanqi; Feng Wenqiang	(Canada); Ava Kemp; Yohnatan Elizarov	

=== Ice dance ===
Ice dance event medalists
Season	Location	Gold	Silver	Bronze	Ref.
1997–98	(Switzerland) Lausanne	(Italy); Federica Faiella; Luciano Milo	(Russia); Oksana Potdykova; Denis Petukhov	(Italy); Flavia Ottaviani; Massimo Scali	
1998–99	(United States) Detroit	(United States); Jamie Silverstein; Justin Pekarek	(Italy); Federica Faiella; Luciano Milo	(Russia); Natalia Romaniuta; Daniil Barantsev	
1999–2000	(Poland) Gdańsk	(Russia); Natalia Romaniuta; Daniil Barantsev	(United States); Emilie Nussear; Brandon Forsyth	(Ukraine); Kristina Kobaladze; Oleg Voyko	
2000–01	(United Kingdom) Ayr	(United States); Tanith Belbin; Benjamin Agosto	(Russia); Elena Khalyavina; Maxim Shabalin	(Germany); Miriam Steinel; Vladimir Tsvetkov	
2001–02	(Slovenia) Bled	(Russia); Elena Khalyavina; Maxim Shabalin	(Russia); Elena Romanovskaya; Alexander Grachev	(Germany); Miriam Steinel; Vladimir Tsvetkov	
2002–03	(Netherlands) The Hague	(Russia); Oksana Domnina; Maxim Shabalin	(Hungary); Nóra Hoffmann; Attila Elek	(Russia); Elena Romanovskaya; Alexander Grachev	
2003–04	(Sweden) Malmö	(Hungary); Nóra Hoffmann; Attila Elek	(Russia); Elena Romanovskaya; Alexander Grachev	(United States); Morgan Matthews; Maxim Zavozin	
2004–05	(Finland) Helsinki	(United States); Morgan Matthews; Maxim Zavozin	(Canada); Tessa Virtue; Scott Moir	(Italy); Anna Cappellini; Matteo Zanni	
2005–06	(Czech Republic) Ostrava	(Canada); Tessa Virtue; Scott Moir	(United States); Meryl Davis; Charlie White	(Italy); Anna Cappellini; Luca Lanotte	
2006–07	(Bulgaria) Sofia	(United States); Madison Hubbell; Keiffer Hubbell	(United States); Emily Samuelson; Evan Bates	(Russia); Ekaterina Bobrova; Dmitri Soloviev	
2007–08	(Poland) Gdańsk	(Russia); Maria Monko; Ilia Tkachenko	(United States); Emily Samuelson; Evan Bates	(Russia); Kristina Gorshkova; Vitali Butikov	
2008–09	(South Korea) Goyang	(United States); Madison Chock; Greg Zuerlein	(United States); Madison Hubbell; Keiffer Hubbell	(Russia); Ekaterina Riazanova; Jonathan Guerreiro	
2009–10	(Japan) Tokyo	(Russia); Ksenia Monko; Kirill Khaliavin	(Russia); Elena Ilinykh; Nikita Katsalapov	(United States); Maia Shibutani; Alex Shibutani	
2010–11	(China) Beijing	(Russia); Ksenia Monko; Kirill Khaliavin	(Russia); Victoria Sinitsina; Ruslan Zhiganshin	(Russia); Alexandra Stepanova; Ivan Bukin	
2011–12	(Canada) Quebec City	(Russia); Victoria Sinitsina; Ruslan Zhiganshin	(Russia); Anna Yanovskaya; Sergey Mozgov	(Russia); Alexandra Stepanova; Ivan Bukin	
2012–13	(Russia) Sochi	(Russia); Alexandra Stepanova; Ivan Bukin	(France); Gabriella Papadakis; Guillaume Cizeron	(United States); Alexandra Aldridge; Daniel Eaton	
2013–14	(Japan) Fukuoka	(Russia); Anna Yanovskaya; Sergey Mozgov	(United States); Kaitlin Hawayek; Jean-Luc Baker	(United States); Lorraine McNamara; Quinn Carpenter	
2014–15	(Spain) Barcelona	(Russia); Anna Yanovskaya; Sergey Mozgov	(Russia); Alla Loboda; Pavel Drozd	(Russia); Betina Popova; Yuri Vlasenko	
2015–16	(Spain) Barcelona	(United States); Lorraine McNamara; Quinn Carpenter	(Russia); Alla Loboda; Pavel Drozd	(United States); Rachel Parsons; Michael Parsons	
2016–17	(France) Marseille	(United States); Rachel Parsons; Michael Parsons	(Russia); Alla Loboda; Pavel Drozd	(United States); Lorraine McNamara; Quinn Carpenter	
2017–18	(Japan) Nagoya	(Russia); Anastasia Skoptsova; Kirill Aleshin	(United States); Christina Carreira; Anthony Ponomarenko	(Russia); Sofia Polishchuk; Alexander Vakhnov	
2018–19	(Canada) Vancouver	(Russia); Sofia Shevchenko; Igor Eremenko	(Russia); Arina Ushakova; Maxim Nekrasov	(Russia); Elizaveta Khudaiberdieva; Nikita Nazarov	
2019–20	(Italy) Turin	(Georgia (country)); Maria Kazakova; Georgy Reviya	(United States); Avonley Nguyen; Vadym Kolesnik	(Russia); Elizaveta Shanaeva; Devid Naryzhnyy	
2020–21	(China) Beijing	Competitions cancelled due to the COVID-19 pandemic			
2021–22	(Japan) Osaka	Competitions cancelled due to the COVID-19 pandemic			
2022–23	(Italy) Turin	(Canada); Nadiia Bashynska; Peter Beaumont	(South Korea); Hannah Lim; Ye Quan	(Czech Republic); Kateřina Mrázková; Daniel Mrázek	
2023–24	(China) Beijing	(United States); Leah Neset; Artem Markelov	(Israel); Elizabeth Tkachenko; Alexei Kiliakov	(Germany); Darya Grimm; Michail Savitskiy	
2024–25	(France) Grenoble	(Italy); Noemi Maria Tali; Noah Lafornara	(United States); Katarina Wolfkostin; Dimitry Tsarevski	(Germany); Darya Grimm; Michail Savitskiy	
2025–26	(Japan) Nagoya	(United States); Hana Maria Aboian; Daniil Veselukhin	(France); Ambre Perrier Gianesini; Samuel Blanc Klaperman	(Ukraine); Iryna Pidgaina; Artem Koval	

== Records ==
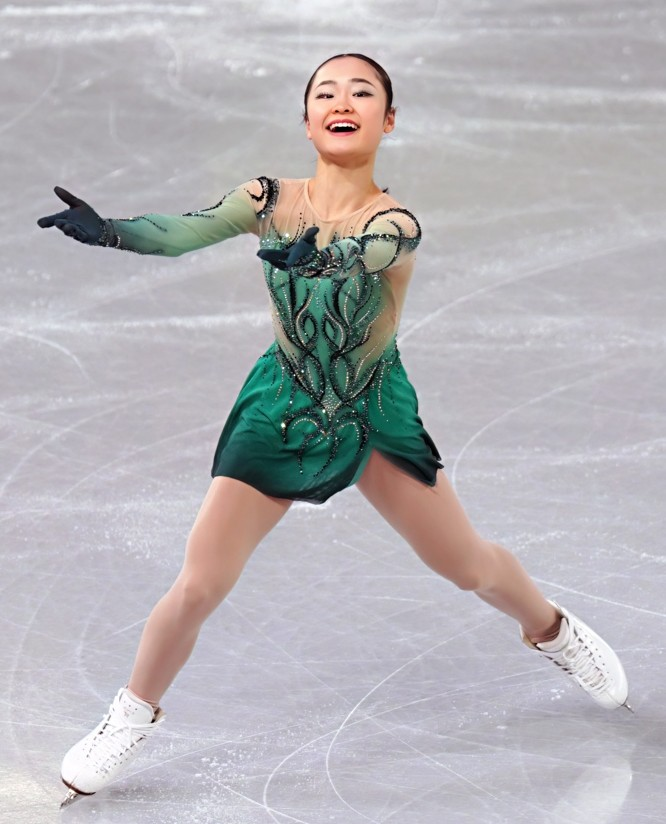
Mao Shimada of Japan won four Junior Grand Prix of Figure Skating Final titles in women's singles.

Records
Discipline	Most titles			
Discipline	Skater(s)	No.	Seasons	Ref.
Men's singles	—N/a			
Women's singles	(Japan); Mao Shimada	4	2022–23, 2023–24, 2024–25, 2025–26	
Pairs	(Russia); Anastasia Mishina; (Note: Anastasia Mishina won one title while partnered with Vladislav Mirzoev (2016–17), and one with Aleksandr Galliamov (2018–19).)	2	2016–17, 2018–19	
Pairs	(Ukraine); Julia Obertas; Dmytro Palamarchuk	2	1997–98, 1998–99	
Pairs	(China); Sui Wenjing; Han Cong	2	2009–10, 2011–12	
Pairs	(China); Zhang Dan; Zhang Hao	2	2000–01, 2001–02	
Ice dance	(Russia); Ksenia Monko; Kirill Khaliavin	2	2009–10, 2010–11	
Ice dance	(Russia); Maxim Shabalin; (Note: Maxim Shabalin won one title while partnered with Elena Khalyavina (2001–02), and one with Oksana Domnina (2002–03).)	2	2001–02, 2002–03	
Ice dance	(Russia); Anna Yanovskaya; Sergey Mozgov	2	2013–14, 2014–15	

== Cumulative medal count ==
=== Men's singles ===
Total number of Junior Grand Prix Final medals in men's singles by nation
Rank	Nation	Gold	Silver	Bronze	Total
1	United States	10	7	9	26
2	Japan	5	3	6	14
3	Russia	4	9	5	18
4	China	3	4	0	7
5	France	2	0	0	2
6	South Korea	1	2	1	4
7	Canada	1	0	4	5
8	Italy	1	0	0	1
9	Bulgaria	0	1	0	1
9	Germany	0	1	0	1
11	Belgium	0	0	1	1
11	Slovakia	0	0	1	1
Totals (12 entries)		27	27	27	81

=== Women's singles ===
Total number of Junior Grand Prix Final medals in women's singles by nation
Rank	Nation	Gold	Silver	Bronze	Total
1	Russia	12	11	9	32
2	Japan	9	3	10	22
3	United States	5	7	4	16
4	South Korea	1	4	1	6
5	Italy	0	1	0	1
5	Sweden	0	1	0	1
7	China	0	0	2	2
8	Hungary	0	0	1	1
Totals (8 entries)		27	27	27	81

=== Pairs ===
Total number of Junior Grand Prix Final medals in pairs by nation
Rank	Nation	Gold	Silver	Bronze	Total
1	Russia	9	13	12	34
2	China	8	2	3	13
3	Ukraine	3	0	0	3
4	Canada	2	3	3	8
5	Australia	2	0	0	2
6	United States	1	6	8	15
7	Japan	1	1	1	3
8	Georgia	1	0	0	1
9	Czech Republic	0	2	0	2
Totals (9 entries)		27	27	27	81

=== Ice dance ===
Total number of Junior Grand Prix Final medals in ice dance by nation
Rank	Nation	Gold	Silver	Bronze	Total
1	Russia	12	11	11	34
2	United States	9	9	6	24
3	Italy	2	1	3	6
4	Canada	2	1	0	3
5	Hungary	1	1	0	2
6	Georgia	1	0	0	1
7	France	0	2	0	2
8	Israel	0	1	0	1
8	South Korea	0	1	0	1
10	Germany	0	0	4	4
11	Ukraine	0	0	2	2
12	Czech Republic	0	0	1	1
Totals (12 entries)		27	27	27	81

=== Total medals ===
Total number of Junior Grand Prix Final medals by nation
Rank	Nation	Gold	Silver	Bronze	Total
1	Russia	37	44	37	118
2	United States	25	29	27	81
3	Japan	15	7	17	39
4	China	11	6	5	22
5	Canada	5	4	7	16
6	Italy	3	2	3	8
7	Ukraine	3	0	2	5
8	South Korea	2	7	2	11
9	France	2	2	0	4
10	Australia	2	0	0	2
10	Georgia	2	0	0	2
12	Hungary	1	1	1	3
13	Czech Republic	0	2	1	3
14	Germany	0	1	4	5
15	Bulgaria	0	1	0	1
15	Israel	0	1	0	1
15	Sweden	0	1	0	1
18	Belgium	0	0	1	1
18	Slovakia	0	0	1	1
Totals (19 entries)		108	108	108	324
