= 2003 Nebelhorn Trophy =

- Type: Senior International
- Date: 3 – 6 September
- Season: 2003–04
- Location: Oberstdorf
- Venue: Bundesleistungszentrum Oberstdorf

Champions
- Men's singles: (Canada) Nicholas Young
- Ladies' singles: (United States) Jennifer Don
- Pairs: (Canada) Utako Wakamatsu / Jean-Sébastien Fecteau
- Ice dance: (Russia) Svetlana Kulikova / Vitali Novikov
- Previous: 2002 Nebelhorn Trophy
- Next: 2004 Nebelhorn Trophy

The 2003 Nebelhorn Trophy took place between 3 and 6 September 2003 at the Bundesleistungszentrum Oberstdorf. It is an international senior-level figure skating competition organized by the Deutsche Eislauf-Union and held annually in Oberstdorf, Germany. The competition is named after the Nebelhorn, a nearby mountain. This was the first international competition to use the ISU Judging System.

It was one of the first international senior competitions of the season. Skaters were entered by their respective national federations, rather than receiving individual invitations as in the Grand Prix of Figure Skating, and competed in four disciplines: men's singles, ladies' singles, pair skating, and ice dance. The Fritz-Geiger-Memorial Trophy was presented to Canada, the country with the highest placements across all disciplines.

== Results ==
=== Men ===
Rank	Name	Nation	Total points	SP		FS	
1	Nicholas Young	Canada	183.13	1	69.20	2	113.93
2	Scott Smith	United States	181.40	2	60.80	1	120.60
3	Nicholas LaRoche	United States	172.14	3	59.16	3	112.98
4	Alexei Vasilevsky	Russia	161.52	4	57.63	4	103.89
5	Filip Stiller	Sweden	155.77	6	54.40	5	101.37
6	Trifun Zivanovic	Serbia and Montenegro	151.68	8	52.84	6	98.84
7	Vincent Restencourt	France	151.07	5	56.27	7	94.80
8	Noriyuki Kanzaki	Japan	138.29	12	46.19	8	92.10
9	Ari-Pekka Nurmenkari	Finland	138.17	9	49.11	9	89.06
10	Gregor Urbas	Slovenia	136.19	7	54.03	12	82.16
11	Martin Liebers	Germany	128.03	15	43.73	10	84.30
12	Maciej Kuś	Poland	127.71	11	47.77	13	79.94
13	Frederik Pauls	Germany	126.52	10	48.20	14	78.32
14	Kristoffer Berntsson	Sweden	126.48	14	44.32	11	82.16
15	Mikko Minkkinen	Finland	119.04	13	44.69	16	74.35
16	Aidas Reklys	Lithuania	110.00	17	33.86	15	76.14
WD	Clemens Brummer	Germany		16	43.00		

=== Ladies ===
Rank	Name	Nation	Total points	SP		FS	
1	Jennifer Don	United States	143.07	1	49.54	1	93.53
2	Lesley Hawker	Canada	131.46	2	47.04	2	84.42
3	Olga Naidenova	Russia	119.54	9	38.16	3	81.38
4	Miia Marttinen	Finland	119.43	4	44.50	6	74.93
5	Daria Timoshenko	Azerbaijan	118.62	5	44.36	7	74.26
6	Denise Zimmermann	Germany	118.35	6	40.94	4	77.41
7	Amber Corwin	United States	117.87	3	45.80	8	72.07
8	Sara Falotico	Belgium	113.64	12	36.32	5	77.32
9	Katharina Häcker	Germany	109.92	7	40.50	9	69.42
10	Kristin Wieczorek	Germany	101.79	10	36.88	10	64.91
11	Caroline Gülke	Germany	96.46	8	38.76	11	57.70
12	Constanze Kemmner	Germany	86.58	13	33.84	13	52.74
13	Shirene Human	South Africa	85.03	11	36.74	15	48.29
14	Iryna Lukianenko	Ukraine	84.38	15	30.36	12	54.02
15	Alenka Zidar	Slovenia	83.77	14	32.00	14	51.77
WD	Idora Hegel	Croatia					

=== Pairs ===
Rank	Name	Nation	Total points	SP		FS	
1	Utako Wakamatsu / Jean-Sébastien Fecteau	Canada	150.24	1	51.00	1	99.24
2	Pascale Bergeron / Robert Davison	Canada	132.98	3	46.20	2	86.78
3	Laura Handy / Jeremy Allen	United States	130.33	2	47.28	3	83.05
4	Larisa Spielberg / Craig Joeright	United States	125.26	5	43.20	4	82.06
5	Nicole Nönnig / Matthias Bleyer	Germany	119.78	6	42.48	5	77.30
6	Mikkeline Kierkgaard / Norman Jeschke	Germany	118.00	4	43.24	6	74.76
7	Anastasia Kuzmina / Stanislav Evdokimov	Russia	112.72	7	42.08	7	70.64
8	Milica Brozovic / Vladimir Futas	Slovakia	102.54	8	38.12	8	64.42
WD	Eva-Maria Fitze / Rico Rex	Germany		9	35.40		

=== Ice dance ===
Rank	Name	Nation	Total points	CD		OD		FD	
1	Svetlana Kulikova / Vitali Novikov	Russia	158.88	5	28.74	1	45.74	1	84.46
2	Jana Khokhlova / Sergei Novitski	Russia	154.58	2	31.14	4	42.05	2	81.41
3	Christie Moxley / Alexander Kirsanov	United States	153.63	3	30.68	3	43.51	6	79.47
4	Sinead Kerr / John Kerr	United Kingdom	153.38	7	28.08	2	44.33	3	81.03
5	Alexandra Kauc / Michał Zych	Poland	153.03	1	32.35	7	40.81	4	79.88
6	Lydia Manon / Ryan O'Meara	United States	150.72	4	29.27	5	41.84	5	79.66
7	Tara Doherty / Tyler Myles	Canada	138.80	10	23.85	8	37.02	7	77.91
8	Judith Longpre / Shae Zukiwski	Canada	134.26	6	28.08	6	40.97	8	65.26
9	Maria Bińczyk / Michał Tomaszewski	Poland	116.16	9	24.41	9	33.12	10	59.33
10	Agnieszka Dulej / Slawonir Janicki	Poland	110.65	8	25.58	10	29.43	11	58.61
11	Natalie Buck / Trent Nelson-Bond	Australia	106.83	11	21.31	11	26.01	19	55.65
WD	Anastasia Grebenkina / Vazgen Azrojan	Armenia							
