= Code of Points =

Code of Points may refer to:

- Code of Points (gymnastics), a rulebook that defines the scoring system for each level of competition in gymnastics
- ISU Judging System, scoring system used to judge figure skating
