= Ilia Isaev =

Russian ice dancer

Personal information
- Native name: Илья Исаев
- Born: 12 August 1980 (age 45)

Figure skating career
- Country: Russia
- Retired: 2003

Ilia Isaev (Russian: Илья Исаев, born 12 August 1980) is a Russian former competitive ice dancer. With partner Anastasia Belova, he won bronze medals at the 2000 Skate Israel, 2001 Nebelhorn Trophy, and 2002 Nebelhorn Trophy.

== Competitive highlights ==
With Belova

International
Event	97–98	98–99	99–00	00–01	01–02	02–03
Golden Spin				7th		
Nebelhorn Trophy					3rd	3rd
Schäfer Memorial					4th	
Skate Israel				3rd		
Winter Universiade				10th		
International: Junior
JGP Bulgaria		4th				
JGP Hungary	5th					
JGP Slovakia		4th				
JGP Slovenia			5th			
National
Russian Champ.			7th	7th	6th	
JGP: ISU Junior Series/Junior Grand Prix
