= Dénommée =

Dénommée, Denommée is a French surname. Notable people with the surname include:

- Jayson Dénommée (born 1977), Canadian figure skater
- Laurie Denommée (born 2000), Canadian artistic gymnast
