= 2000 U.S. Figure Skating Championships =

Figure skating competition

- Type: National championship
- Date: February 6 – 13
- Season: 1999–2000
- Location: Cleveland, Ohio
- Venue: Gund Arena

Champions
- Men's singles: Michael Weiss
- Ladies' singles: Michelle Kwan
- Pairs: Kyoko Ina / John Zimmerman
- Ice dance: Naomi Lang / Peter Tchernyshev
- Previous: 1999 U.S. Championships
- Next: 2001 U.S. Championships

The 2000 U.S. Figure Skating Championships took place between February 6 and 13, 2000 at the Gund Arena in Cleveland, Ohio. Medals were awarded in four colors: gold (first), silver (second), bronze (third), and pewter (fourth) in four disciplines – men's singles, ladies' singles, pair skating, and ice dancing – across three levels: senior, junior, and novice.

The event was used to determine the U.S. teams for the 2000 World Championships, 2000 Four Continents Championships, and the 2000 World Junior Championships.

== Senior results ==
=== Men ===
| Rank | Name | Club | TFP | SP | FS |
|---|---|---|---|---|---|
| 1 | Michael Weiss | Washington FSC | 1.5 | 1 | 1 |
| 2 | Timothy Goebel | Winterhurst FSC | 3.0 | 2 | 2 |
| 3 | Trifun Zivanovic | All Year FSC | 5.0 | 4 | 3 |
| 4 | Matthew Savoie | Illinois Valley FSC | 6.5 | 3 | 5 |
| 5 | Ryan Jahnke | Broadmoor SC | 7.5 | 7 | 4 |
| 6 | Damon Allen | Broadmoor SC | 8.5 | 5 | 6 |
| 7 | Ryan Bradley | Broadmoor SC | 10.0 | 6 | 7 |
| 8 | Derrick Delmore | Washington FSC | 13.0 | 10 | 8 |
| 9 | Justin Dillon | St. Moritz ISC | 13.0 | 8 | 9 |
| 10 | Johnnie Bevan | Spokane FSC | 17.0 | 12 | 11 |
| 11 | Kurt Fromknecht | Westminster FSC of Erie | 17.5 | 15 | 10 |
| 12 | Don Baldwin | Los Angeles FSC | 18.5 | 13 | 12 |
| 13 | Danny Clausen | St. Paul FSC | 19.5 | 11 | 14 |
| 14 | Jeff Merica | University of Delaware FSC | 19.5 | 9 | 15 |
| 15 | John Baldwin Jr. | All Year FSC | 20.0 | 14 | 13 |
| WD | Shepherd Clark | The SC of Boston | | | |

=== Ladies ===
| Rank | Name | Club | TFP | SP | FS |
|---|---|---|---|---|---|
| 1 | Michelle Kwan | Los Angeles FSC | 2.5 | 3 | 1 |
| 2 | Sasha Cohen | Orange County FSC | 2.5 | 1 | 2 |
| 3 | Sarah Hughes | The SC of New York | 4.0 | 2 | 3 |
| 4 | Angela Nikodinov | All Year FSC | 6.0 | 4 | 4 |
| 5 | Andrea Gardiner | Houston FSC | 8.0 | 6 | 5 |
| 6 | Stacey Pensgen | Genesee FSC | 10.5 | 7 | 7 |
| 7 | Jennifer Kirk | The SC of Boston | 11.5 | 11 | 6 |
| 8 | Naomi Nari Nam | All Year FSC | 11.5 | 5 | 9 |
| 9 | Deanna Stellato | Wagon Wheel FSC | 12.0 | 8 | 8 |
| 10 | Sara Wheat | University of Delaware FSC | 16.0 | 12 | 10 |
| 11 | Andrea Aggeler | Broadmoor SC | 17.0 | 10 | 12 |
| 12 | Brittney McConn | Atlanta FSC | 17.5 | 9 | 13 |
| 13 | Amber Corwin | All Year FSC | 18.5 | 15 | 11 |
| 14 | Elizabeth Kwon | SC of Northern Virginia | 21.0 | 14 | 14 |
| 15 | Heidi Pakkala | Braemar-City of Lakes FSC | 21.5 | 13 | 15 |
| 16 | Stephanie Roth | The SC of New York | 24.0 | 16 | 16 |
| 17 | Katie Lee | St. Paul FSC | 26.5 | 19 | 17 |
| 18 | Susan Ng | Rim of the World FSC | 27.0 | 18 | 18 |
| 19 | Cohen Duncan | St. Moritz ISC | 28.5 | 17 | 20 |
| 20 | Kimberly Kilby | St. Moritz ISC | 29.0 | 20 | 19 |

=== Pairs ===
| Rank | Name | Club | TFP | SP | FS |
|---|---|---|---|---|---|
| 1 | Kyoko Ina / John Zimmerman | The SC of New York / Birmingham FSC | 1.5 | 1 | 1 |
| 2 | Tiffany Scott / Philip Dulebohn | Colonial FSC / University of Delaware FSC | 3.0 | 2 | 2 |
| 3 | Larisa Spielberg / Craig Joeright | Detroit SC / Detroit SC | 5.0 | 4 | 3 |
| 4 | Amanda Magarian / Jered Guzman | Broadmoor SC / Los Angeles FSC | 6.5 | 5 | 4 |
| 5 | Tiffany Stiegler / Johnnie Stiegler | Los Angeles FSC | 6.5 | 3 | 5 |
| 6 | Jessica Miller / Jeffrey Weiss | Northern Kentucky SC / Peninsula SC | 10.0 | 8 | 6 |
| 7 | Natalie Vlandis / James Peterson | Los Angeles FSC / Lakewood Winter Club | 10.0 | 6 | 7 |
| 8 | Molly Quigley / Bert Cording | Nashville FSC | 11.5 | 7 | 8 |
| 9 | Whitney Gaynor / David Delago | Peninsula SC / St. Moritz ISC | 14.5 | 11 | 9 |
| 10 | Po Hayes / Richard Gillam | Atlanta FSC / Los Angeles FSC | 14.5 | 9 | 10 |
| 11 | Ashley Wilson / Mel Chapman | Ann Arbor FSC / Garden City FSC | 16.0 | 10 | 11 |
| 12 | Christina Connally / Kevin Donovan | Nashville FSC / Yarmouth Ice Club | 18.0 | 12 | 12 |

=== Ice dancing ===
| Rank | Name | Club | TFP | CD1 | CD2 | OD | FD |
|---|---|---|---|---|---|---|---|
| 1 | Naomi Lang / Peter Tchernyshev | Detroit SC | 2.0 | 1 | 1 | 1 | 1 |
| 2 | Jamie Silverstein / Justin Pekarek | Detroit SC | 4.0 | 2 | 2 | 2 | 2 |
| 3 | Deborah Koegel / Oleg Fediukov | IceWorks SC | 6.6 | 3 | 3 | 4 | 3 |
| 4 | Beata Handra / Charles Sinek | Santa Rosa FSC / The SC of New York | 7.4 | 4 | 4 | 3 | 4 |
| 5 | Alison Newman / Dmitri Boundoukin | New England FSC | 10.0 | 5 | 5 | 5 | 5 |
| 6 | Crystal Beckerdite / Matt Healy | Broadmoor SC | 12.0 | 6 | 6 | 6 | 6 |
| 7 | Jamie Katz / Vasilij Serkov | Washington FSC | 14.6 | 7 | 7 | 8 | 7 |
| 8 | Kristin Fraser / Jonathan Nichols | Detroit SC | 15.4 | 8 | 8 | 7 | 8 |
| 9 | Annie Yang / Walter Lang | Los Angeles FSC / The SC of Boston | 18.8 | 10 | 9 | 10 | 9 |
| 10 | Stephanie Woodman / Robert Peal | University of Delaware FSC / Skokie Valley SC | 19.2 | 9 | 10 | 9 | 10 |
| 11 | Caitlin Obremski / Jonathan Magalnick | Washington FSC / Coyotes SC of Arizona | 22.4 | 12 | 12 | 11 | 11 |
| 12 | Disa Steiber / Patrick Connolly | Skokie Valley SC / All Year FSC | 23.6 | 11 | 11 | 12 | 12 |
| WD | Elizabeth Curtiss / Vincent VanVliet | University of Delaware FSC / Genesee FSC | | | | | |

== Junior results ==
=== Men ===
| Rank | Name | Club | TFP | SP | FS |
|---|---|---|---|---|---|
| 1 | Evan Lysacek | DuPage FSC | 3.5 | 5 | 1 |
| 2 | Parker Pennington | Winterhurst FSC | 4.0 | 4 | 2 |
| 3 | Benjamin Miller | St. Paul FSC | 4.0 | 2 | 3 |
| 4 | Daniel Lee | Broadmoor SC | 5.5 | 3 | 4 |
| 5 | Johnny Weir | University of Delaware FSC | 5.5 | 1 | 5 |
| 6 | Michael Villarreal | Arctic Blades FSC | 9.0 | 6 | 6 |
| 7 | Nicholas LaRoche | Colonial FSC | 10.5 | 7 | 7 |
| 8 | David Glynn | Los Angeles FSC | 12.0 | 8 | 8 |
| 9 | Michael Sasaki | South Bay FSC | 13.5 | 9 | 9 |
| 10 | Jason Heffron | FSC of Rockford | 16.0 | 12 | 10 |
| 11 | Victor Ehre, III | Jamestown SC | 16.0 | 10 | 11 |
| 12 | Joshua Murphy | New England FSC | 18.5 | 13 | 12 |
| 13 | Jordan Wilson | Santa Rosa FSC | 18.5 | 11 | 13 |

=== Ladies ===
| Rank | Name | Club | TFP | SP | FS |
|---|---|---|---|---|---|
| 1 | Ann Patrice McDonough | Broadmoor SC | 2.0 | 2 | 1 |
| 2 | Lisa Nesuda | Dallas FSC | 2.5 | 1 | 2 |
| 3 | Kathryn Orscher | SC of Hartford | 6.5 | 5 | 4 |
| 4 | Dirke O'Brien Baker | University of Delaware FSC | 7.0 | 4 | 5 |
| 5 | Jordana Blesa | Los Angeles FSC | 7.5 | 3 | 6 |
| 6 | Beatrisa Liang | All Year FSC | 8.0 | 10 | 3 |
| 7 | Kim Ryan | Lilac City FSC | 10.0 | 6 | 7 |
| 8 | Lindsey Weber | Detroit SC | 12.5 | 9 | 8 |
| 9 | Midori Williams | Colonial FSC | 12.5 | 7 | 9 |
| 10 | Kimberly Olson-Wheeler | DuPage FSC | 15.5 | 11 | 10 |
| 11 | Joanna Glick | The SC of New York | 16.0 | 8 | 12 |
| 12 | Felicia Beck | Los Angeles FSC | 17.0 | 12 | 11 |

=== Pairs ===
| Rank | Name | Club | TFP | SP | FS |
|---|---|---|---|---|---|
| 1 | Stephanie Kalesavich / Aaron Parchem | Detroit SC | 2.0 | 2 | 1 |
| 2 | Sima Ganaba / Amir Ganaba | Los Angeles FSC | 2.5 | 1 | 2 |
| 3 | Jessica Waldstein / Garrett Lucash | South Bay FSC / Charter Oak FSC | 5.0 | 4 | 3 |
| 4 | Megan Sierk / Dustin Sierk | Huntsville FSC | 5.5 | 3 | 4 |
| 5 | Abbi Gleeson / Jonathon Hunt | University of Delaware FSC | 8.5 | 7 | 5 |
| 6 | Terese Anselmi / Michael Adler | Detroit SC | 9.0 | 6 | 6 |
| 7 | Emily Morgan / Justin Cogley | Jamestown SC | 9.5 | 5 | 7 |
| 8 | Lindsay Rogeness / Brian Rogeness | Los Angeles FSC | 12.0 | 8 | 8 |
| 9 | Christen Dean / Joshua Murphy | New England FSC | 14.5 | 11 | 9 |
| 10 | Emma Phibbs / William Rasmussen | Washington FSC | 15.0 | 10 | 10 |
| 11 | Brooke Kayland / Everett Weiss | Los Angeles FSC / All Year FSC | 15.5 | 9 | 11 |
| 12 | Kristen Treni / Robert Schupp | Jamestown SC / Santa Rosa FSC | 18.0 | 12 | 12 |
| 13 | Carey Floyd / Scott Shelton | Nashville FSC / Detroit SC | 19.5 | 13 | 13 |

=== Ice dancing ===
| Rank | Name | Club | TFP | CD1 | CD2 | OD | FD |
|---|---|---|---|---|---|---|---|
| 1 | Tanith Belbin / Benjamin Agosto | Detroit SC / Skokie Valley SC | 2.6 | 1 | 1 | 2 | 1 |
| 2 | Emilie Nussear / Brandon Forsyth | Charter Oak FSC | 3.4 | 2 | 2 | 1 | 2 |
| 3 | Jesica Valentine / Matthew Kossack | SC of Maine / The SC of Boston | 6.0 | 3 | 3 | 3 | 3 |
| 4 | Lia Nitake / Ryan O'Meara | All Year FSC / Coyotes SC of Arizona | 9.0 | 5 | 5 | 5 | 4 |
| 5 | Kakani Young / Ikaika Young | Seattle SC | 9.0 | 4 | 4 | 4 | 5 |
| 6 | Lydia Manon / Chris Obzansky | University of Delaware FSC | 12.0 | 6 | 6 | 6 | 6 |
| 7 | Wendi Mangiagli / Joshua Abrahams | All Year FSC / The SC of Boston | 14.4 | 9 | 7 | 7 | 7 |
| 8 | Katy Hill / Nick Traxler | Lone Star FSC | 15.8 | 7 | 8 | 8 | 8 |
| 9 | Laura Munana / Paul Goldner | Palomares FSC / Hickory Hill FSC | 18.8 | 8 | 9 | 9 | 10 |
| 10 | Kimberly Navarro / Robert Shmalo | Santa Rosa FSC / Queen City FSC | 19.2 | 10 | 11 | 10 | 9 |
| 11 | Kendra Goodwin / Tyrrell Cockrum | SC of Morris NJ / Seattle SC | 21.8 | 11 | 10 | 11 | 11 |
| 12 | Donna Baldwin / Zachary Fix | Los Angeles FSC / Texas Gulf Coast FSC | 24.0 | 12 | 12 | 12 | 12 |
