= Svetlana Kulikova =

Russian ice dancer

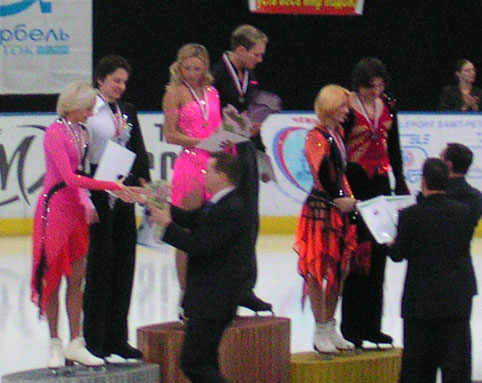
- Kulikova on the Russian Nationals podium in 2004. (Fourth from the right)

Personal information
- Born: November 14, 1980 (age 45) Moscow, Russian SFSR, Soviet Union
- Height: 1.71 m (5 ft 7 1/2 in)

Figure skating career
- Country: Russia
- Began skating: 1983
- Retired: 2005
Medal record
Representing Russia
Figure skating: Ice dancing
Winter Universiade
Bronze medal – third place	2001 Zakopane	Ice dancing

Svetlana Kulikova (born November 14, 1980) is a Russian former competitive ice dancer. With Arseni Markov, she won bronze medals at the 2001 Winter Universiade and 2002 Skate Canada International. With Vitali Novikov, she was the 2003 Nebelhorn Trophy champion.

== Career ==
Kulikova teamed up with Markov in 1996. They placed 6th at the 2000 World Junior Championships. Following the 2000–2001 season, Kulikova and Markov moved to Newington, Connecticut, to train full-time with Tatiana Tarasova and Nikolai Morozov. They won the bronze medal at the 2002 Skate Canada International. They parted ways after the 2003 Russian Championships as a result of Tarasova and Morozov ending their coaching partnership – Kulikova chose to stay with Tarasova while Markov chose Morozov.

Kulikova and Novikov teamed up in January 2003. They won the first competition they entered as a team, the 2003 Nebelhorn Trophy. They won two medals at the Russian Championships and competed twice at the European and World Championships. Their best results were 7th at 2005 Europeans and 13th at 2004 Worlds. Kulikova / Novikov were coached by Tatiana Tarasova and Evgeni Platov. They parted ways after placing 14th at the 2005 World Championships.

Kulikova lives in the United States where she works as a choreographer.

== Programs ==
=== With Novikov ===
Season	Original dance	Free dance
2004–2005	Quickstep: Girls, Girls, Girls; Slow Foxtrot: New York, New York; Quickstep: Girls, Girls, Girls	Mon Amour by Sarah Brightman; Flamenco; Mon Amour by Sarah Brightman
2003–2004	Rock'n Roll; Blues; Rock'n Roll	Carmina Burana by Carl Orff (modern arrangement)

=== With Markov ===
Season	Original dance	Free dance
2002–2003	Waltz: Waltz Masquerade by Aram Khachaturian; March: Toska po Rodine (Homesickness) by A. Trofimov; Waltz: Waltz Masquerade by Aram Khachaturian	Fire on Ice by B. Mortuzavi
2001–2002	Libertango by Astor Piazzolla; Waltz: Have You Ever Really Loved a Woman by Bryan Adams	Grease

== Results ==
GP: Grand Prix; JGP: Junior Grand Prix

=== With Novikov ===
International
Event	2003–04	2004–05
World Championships	13th	14th
European Championships	8th	7th
GP Cup of Russia	7th	
GP NHK Trophy		5th
GP Skate America		4th
GP Trophée Lalique	5th	
Nebelhorn Trophy	1st	
National
Russian Championships	3rd	2nd

=== With Markov ===
International
Event	1999–00	2000–01	2001–02	2002–03
GP Cup of Russia		9th		
GP Skate Canada		9th	4th	3rd
GP Trophée Lalique			7th	4th
Winter Universiade		3rd		
International: Junior
World Junior Champ.	6th			
JGP Poland		6th		
National
Russian Champ.	2nd J	6th	4th	2nd
J = Junior level
