= Anastasia Belova =

Russian ice dancer

Personal information
- Native name: Анастасия Белова
- Born: 31 January 1981 (age 45)

Figure skating career
- Country: Russia
- Retired: 2003

Anastasia Belova (Russian: Анастасия Белова, born 31 January 1981) is a Russian former competitive ice dancer. Competing with Maxim Staviski, she placed ninth at the 1996 World Junior Championships in Brisbane, Australia. With later partner Ilia Isaev, she won bronze medals at the 2000 Skate Israel, 2001 Nebelhorn Trophy, and 2002 Nebelhorn Trophy.

== Competitive highlights ==
=== With Isaev ===
International
Event	97–98	98–99	99–00	00–01	01–02	02–03
Golden Spin				7th		
Nebelhorn Trophy					3rd	3rd
Schäfer Memorial					4th	
Skate Israel				3rd		
Winter Universiade				10th		
International: Junior
JGP Bulgaria		4th				
JGP Hungary	5th					
JGP Slovakia		4th				
JGP Slovenia			5th			
National
Russian Champ.			7th	7th	6th	
JGP: ISU Junior Series/Junior Grand Prix

=== With Staviski ===
International
Event	1996
World Junior Championships	9th
