= Carolina Kostner =

Italian figure skater (born 1987)

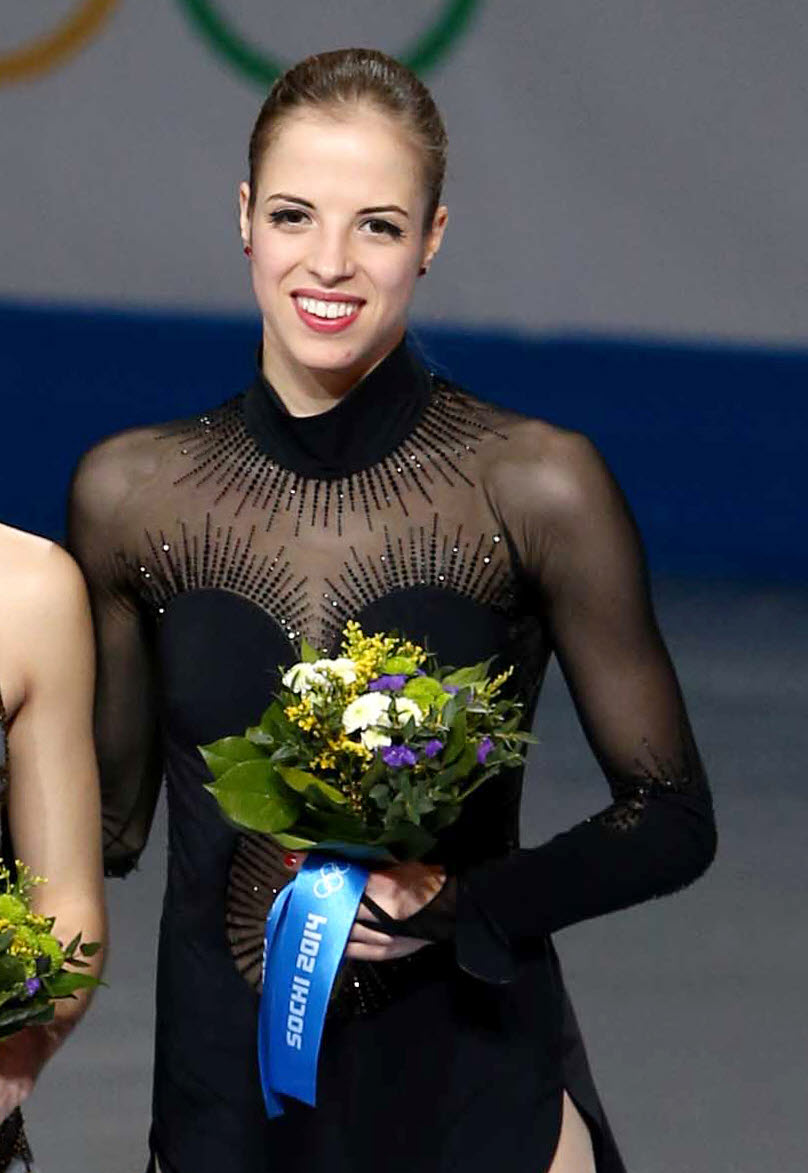
- Kostner at the 2014 Winter Olympics

Personal information
- Born: 8 February 1987 (age 39) Bolzano, South Tyrol, Italy
- Home town: Urtijëi, South Tyrol, Italy
- Height: 1.69 m (5 ft 7 in)

Figure skating career
- Country: Italy
- Coach: Alexei Mishin, Michael Huth
- Skating club: G.S. Fiamme Azzurre
- Began skating: 1990
- Retired: 2019

Medal record
Event	Gold medal – first place	Silver medal – second place	Bronze medal – third place
Olympic Games	0	0	1
World Championships	1	2	3
European Championships	5	2	4
Grand Prix Final	1	1	2
Italian Championships	9	2	0
World Junior Championships	0	0	1
Junior Grand Prix Final	0	1	0
Medal list
Olympic Games
Bronze medal – third place	2014 Sochi	Singles
World Championships
Gold medal – first place	2012 Nice	Singles
Silver medal – second place	2008 Gothenburg	Singles
Silver medal – second place	2013 London	Singles
Bronze medal – third place	2005 Moscow	Singles
Bronze medal – third place	2011 Moscow	Singles
Bronze medal – third place	2014 Saitama	Singles
European Championships
Gold medal – first place	2007 Warsaw	Singles
Gold medal – first place	2008 Zagreb	Singles
Gold medal – first place	2010 Tallinn	Singles
Gold medal – first place	2012 Sheffield	Singles
Gold medal – first place	2013 Zagreb	Singles
Silver medal – second place	2009 Helsinki	Singles
Silver medal – second place	2011 Bern	Singles
Bronze medal – third place	2006 Lyon	Singles
Bronze medal – third place	2014 Budapest	Singles
Bronze medal – third place	2017 Ostrava	Singles
Bronze medal – third place	2018 Moscow	Singles
Grand Prix Final
Gold medal – first place	2011–12 Quebec	Singles
Silver medal – second place	2010–11 Beijing	Singles
Bronze medal – third place	2007–08 Turin	Singles
Bronze medal – third place	2008–09 Goyang	Singles
Italian Championships
Gold medal – first place	2003 Lecco	Singles
Gold medal – first place	2005 Merano	Singles
Gold medal – first place	2006 Sesto San Giovanni	Singles
Gold medal – first place	2007 Trento	Singles
Gold medal – first place	2009 Pinerolo	Singles
Gold medal – first place	2011 Milan	Singles
Gold medal – first place	2013 Milan	Singles
Gold medal – first place	2017 Egna	Singles
Gold medal – first place	2018 Milan	Singles
Silver medal – second place	2004 Milan	Singles
Silver medal – second place	2010 Brescia	Singles
World Junior Championships
Bronze medal – third place	2003 Ostrava	Singles
Junior Grand Prix Final
Silver medal – second place	2002–03 The Hague	Singles

Carolina Kostner (born 8 February 1987) is an Italian figure skating coach and former competitive skater. She is the 2014 Olympic bronze medalist, the 2012 World champion, a five-time European champion (2007, 2008, 2010, 2012, 2013), and the 2011 Grand Prix Final champion. She is also a medalist at five other World Championships (2005, 2008, 2011, 2013, 2014), six other European Championships (2006, 2009, 2011, 2014, 2017, 2018), and three other Grand Prix Finals (2007, 2008, 2010), the 2003 World Junior bronze medalist, and a nine-time Italian national champion. Kostner has won 11 medals at the European championships, most recently in 2018, and is the most decorated singles skater in the history of that competition.

== Personal life ==
Carolina Kostner was born in the South Tyrolean Bolzano and lives in Urtijëi (Ortisei/St. Ulrich). She is one of three children of Patrizia, a nationally ranked figure skater in the 1970s and later a geometric arts teacher, and Erwin, who played ice hockey for the Italian national team at the World Championships and Olympic Games before becoming an ice hockey coach. One of her grandfathers was the director of the Art Academy in her hometown. She has two brothers, one year older Martin and three years younger Simon Kostner, who plays ice hockey for Ritten Sport in Ritten, Italy. Kostner is the cousin and goddaughter of Isolde Kostner, a silver medalist in alpine skiing at the 2002 Winter Olympics.

Kostner's native language is Ladin, and she is also fluent in Italian, German, English and French. In autumn 2007, she enrolled at the University of Turin. She studied art history mainly through correspondence courses. During her suspension from competition, she attended a classical ballet school.

Kostner was formerly in a relationship with former Olympic race walking champion Alex Schwazer.

== Career ==
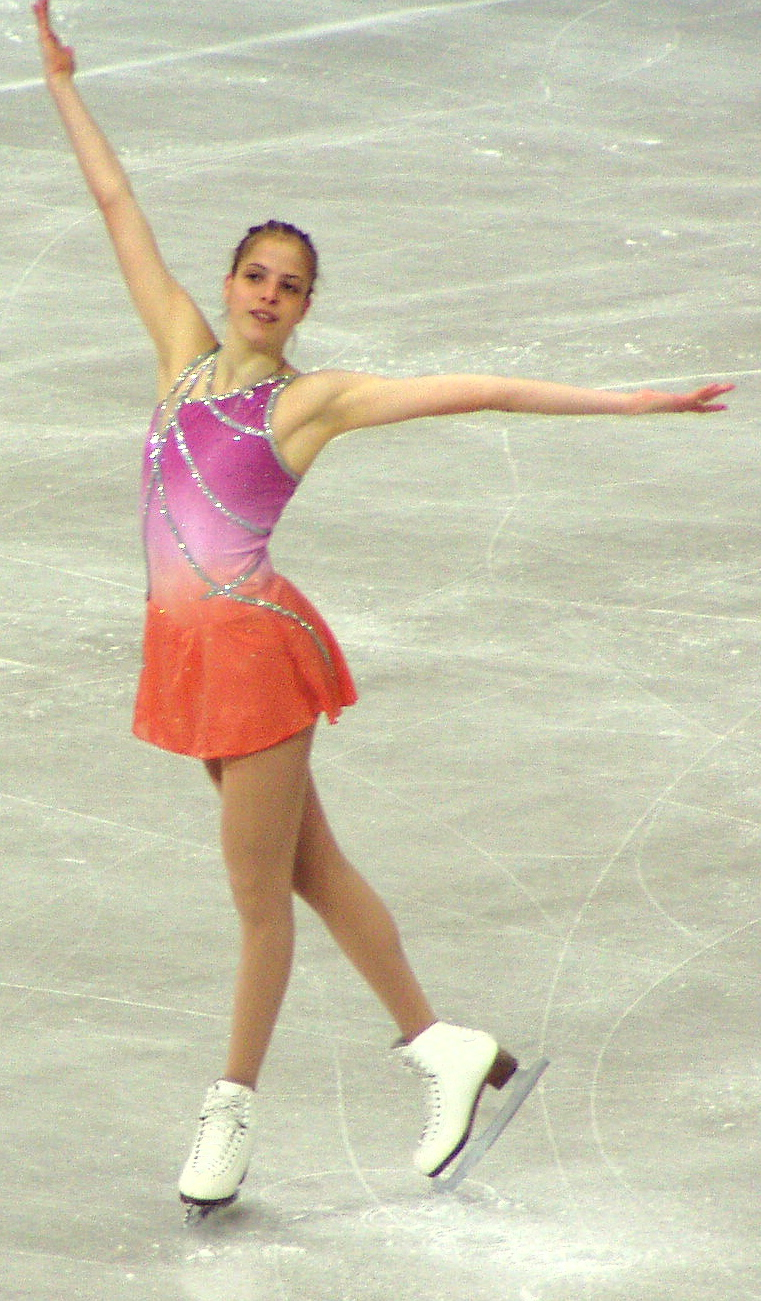
Kostner in 2004

=== Early career ===
Kostner began learning to skate as a four-year-old. She said in 2011, "Half of my family on my dad's side is in sports, and my mother's side is more involved in arts. For me, figure skating was a good mix of the two." When a landslide destroyed her home rink in 2001, Kostner chose to work with Michael Huth in Oberstdorf, Germany – about a four-hour drive from her home in Bolzano.

=== 2002–2003 season ===
Making her senior international debut, Kostner won gold at two September events, the 2002 Nebelhorn Trophy and 2002 Ondrej Nepela Memorial. In January, she finished fourth at the 2003 European Championships in Malmö, Sweden. In March, she became the first Italian skater to medal at Junior Worlds. Ranked first in her qualifying group, first in the short program, and fifth in the free skate, she took bronze at the 2003 World Junior Championships in Ostrava, Czech Republic.

=== 2003–2004 season ===
In the 2003–2004 season, Kostner finished 5th at the 2004 European Championships and at the 2004 World Championships.

=== 2004–2005 season ===
Kostner finished 7th at the 2005 European Championships before beating Michelle Kwan for the bronze medal at the 2005 World Championships in Moscow.

=== 2005–2006 season ===
Kostner won her first European medal in 2006, and was chosen to be flag bearer for the host Italian team during the opening ceremony of the 2006 Winter Olympics. At the Olympics, she placed 9th. The next month, at the 2006 World Championships, she placed 12th.

=== 2006–2007 season ===
Kostner missed the 2006–2007 Grand Prix season due to injury. She won the Italian national title and went on to win her first European title at the 2007 European Championships. She set a new personal best to finish third in the short program at the 2007 Worlds but faltered in the long program and finished 6th overall.

=== 2007–2008 season ===
Kostner medaled at both her Grand Prix events and went to the Grand Prix Final for the first time. At that event, she won the bronze medal. She won her second European title at the 2008 Europeans after winning the short program and placing second in the free skate. At the 2008 Worlds, Kostner won the short program and placed third in the free skate, winning the silver medal overall.

=== 2008–2009 season ===
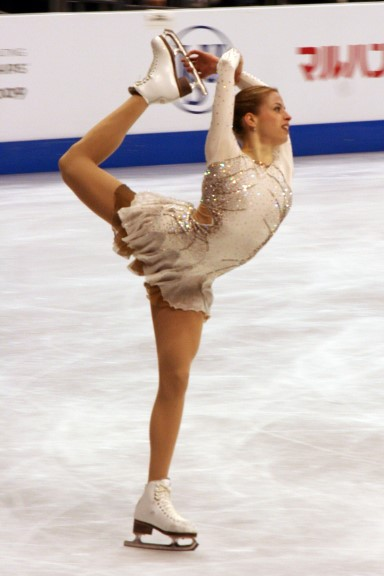
Kostner performs at the 2009 World Figure Skating Championships.

Kostner finished off the podium at her first Grand Prix event, 2008 Skate Canada, lost her European title to Laura Lepistö, and finished 12th at the 2009 World Championships after a long program in which she failed to land a single clean triple. As a result, Italy qualified only one ladies spot for the 2010 Olympics. After eight years of training with coach Michael Huth, Kostner made a coaching change in the summer of 2009, relocating to El Segundo, California to work with Frank Carroll and Christa Fassi, the widow of the late Carlo Fassi.

=== 2009–2010 season ===
Kostner placed 6th at both of her Grand Prix events, the 2009 Trophée Eric Bompard and the 2009 Cup of China. In the middle of the season, she left Carroll but continued training with Christa Fassi, and in Pinerolo, Italy with Edoardo De Bernardis. In December 2009, Kostner lost her national title to Valentina Marchei, which threatened her spot on the Italian team for the Vancouver Games, but the following month she rebounded to win gold at the 2010 European Championships, held in Tallinn, Estonia. At the 2010 Olympic Winter Games, she finished 16th overall after a disastrous 19th place free skate. She was able to finish the season on a better note by placing 6th at the 2010 World Championships, which took place in Turin, near her hometown. In 2011, Kostner said that her bad experience at the Olympics led her to question whether she should continue skating, but that she came to realize that she loved skating.

=== 2010–2011 season ===
Feeling homesick being far from home, Kostner returned to Oberstdorf and resumed training with Huth in July 2010.

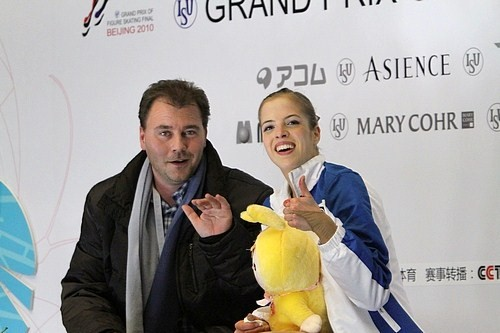
Kostner with coach Michael Huth in 2010

For the 2010–2011 Grand Prix season, Kostner was assigned to the 2010 NHK Trophy and to the 2010 Skate America. During the season, she had a left knee injury. As a result, she did not practice the flip and lutz until the end of 2010. Nevertheless, she was the bronze medalist at Skate America and won the NHK trophy for the second time in her career. At the 2010–11 Grand Prix Final, Kostner placed second in the short program and fourth in the long, winning the silver medal. She also won the silver medal at the 2011 European Championships, where she had a difficult short program but won the free skate. Between the Europeans and Worlds, she took part in the Gardena Spring Trophy, which she won. At the 2011 Worlds in Moscow, Kostner was sixth in the short program but won the bronze medal after a personal-best free skate. It was her first podium finish at Worlds since 2008 and her third overall; she had won her first Worlds medal, also a bronze, in Moscow six years prior. After winning medals at all of her events in 2010–11, Kostner finished atop the ISU season standings. She underwent physiotherapy and took a two-and-a-half month break from skating, returning to training in mid-July.

=== 2011–2012 season ===
As a top-six finisher at the 2011 Worlds, Kostner was allowed to compete in three Grand Prix events in 2011. She elected to do so and was assigned to Skate America, the Cup of China, and the Trophée Eric Bompard. She was the silver medalist at Skate America and won the Cup of China, thus becoming the first skater to qualify for the Grand Prix Final. Kostner then won the silver medal at the Trophée Eric Bompard. In an interview after the event, she stated that her knee was fully recovered and her goal was to include more difficult jumps in the 2012 ISU championships. Kostner posted season's-best scores in the short program (66.43) and the free program (121.05) to win her first-ever gold medal at the Grand Prix Final; her overall score of 187.48 was a new personal best. She is the first Italian single skater to become a Grand Prix Final champion and the second overall after Barbara Fusar-Poli / Maurizio Margaglio, who won the ice dancing title in 2000.

Kostner won the 2012 Europeans, her fourth continental title in ten appearances at the event. Her next competition was the 2012 International Challenge Cup, which she won by more than 26 points.

At the 2012 World Championships in Nice, France, Kostner finished third in the short program and first in the free skate with a new personal best score to take the gold. She became Italy's first World champion in ladies' singles and second in any discipline after Fusar-Poli / Margaglio in 2001. Kostner's final event of the season was the 2012 World Team Trophy, where she competed as part of the Italian team. She set a new personal best score in the short program and placed third in the free skate, finishing 2nd overall.

=== 2012–2013 season ===
Kostner was assigned to the 2012 Cup of China and the 2012 Trophee Eric Bompard. In July 2012, she said that she was considering retiring from competition but on 12 July 2012, she stated that she had decided to continue competing until the 2014 Winter Olympics in Sochi. On 2 August 2012, her name was removed from the entry lists of both of her 2012–2013 Grand Prix events due to insufficient time to reach competitive fitness. On 1 December 2012, Kostner announced on her website that she would be competing in the 2012 Golden Spin of Zagreb. At the 2013 European Championships in Zagreb, Croatia, Kostner finished second in the short program and second in the free skate with a new personal best score to take the gold, her fifth title and her eighth consecutive European medal. She then won her fifth World medal, silver, at the 2013 World Championships.

=== 2013–2014 season ===
In June 2013, Kostner began training for the 2013–2014 season in Oberstdorf. She started her season competing at the 2013 Cup of China where she won the bronze medal and then won the silver medal at the 2013 Cup of Russia. In January 2014, Kostner announced she had changed her competitive programs. At the 2014 European Championships in Budapest, Hungary, Kostner won the bronze medal, her 9th podium in a row in the continental competition.

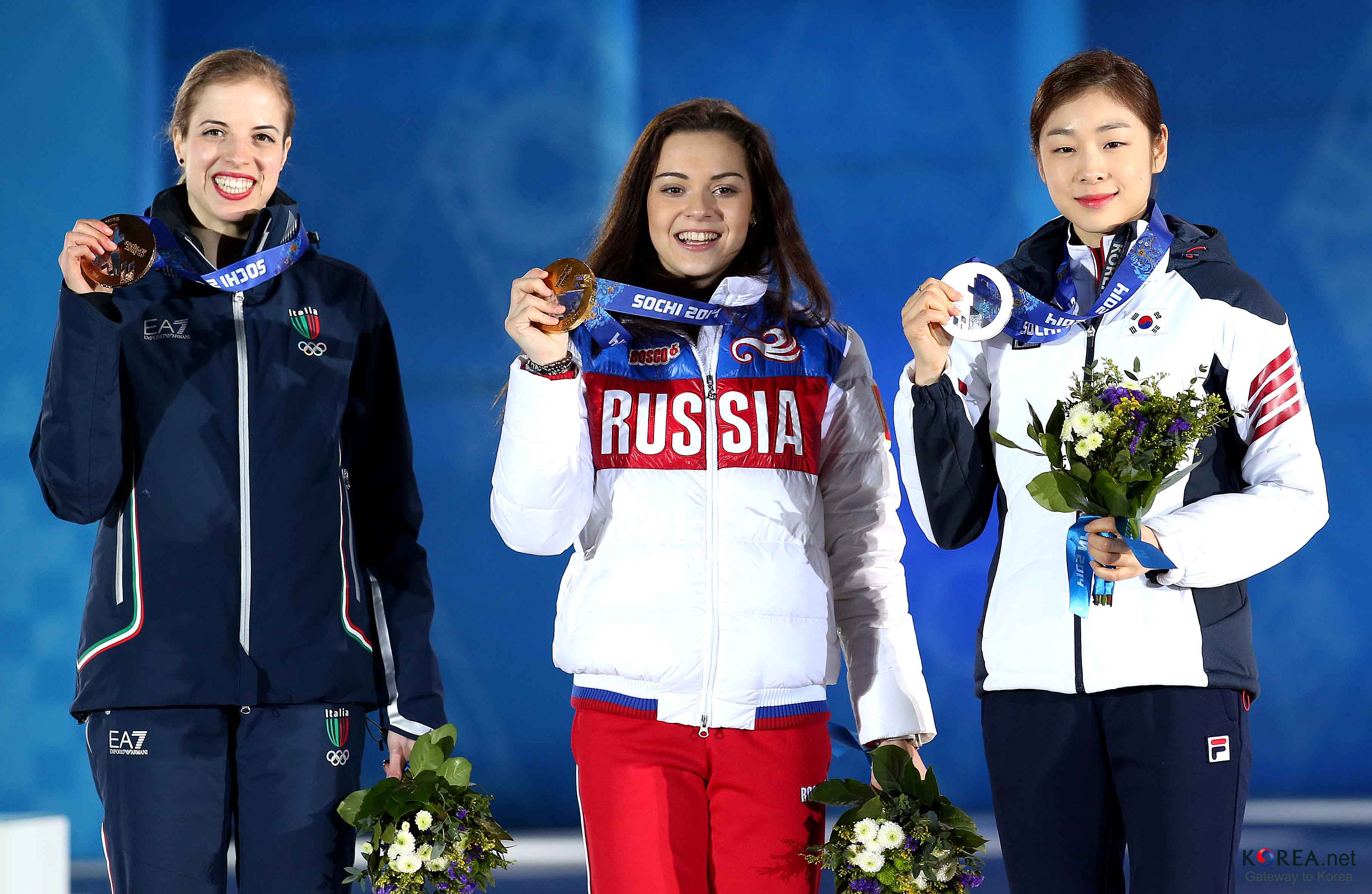
Kostner (left) during the medal ceremony at the 2014 Sochi Olympics

At the 2014 Winter Olympics in Sochi, Russia, Kostner was in third place after the short program, with a score of 74.12, just 0.8 behind leader, and reigning Olympic champion, Kim Yuna of South Korea. She ultimately won the bronze medal after the free skate, with a total score of 216.73. She later said, "That night at the medal ceremony was very emotional; it was a moment when the circle closed for me and my career. I felt I missed nothing in my competitive career anymore."

One month later, at the 2014 World Championships in Saitama, Japan, Kostner placed second in the short program with a score of 77.24, her personal best. She made multiple mistakes in her free skate, where she placed sixth, and finished in third place.

=== 2014 to 2016: Hiatus and competition ban ===
In the summer of 2014 Kostner announced via social media that she would be taking a break from figure skating for the 2014–2015 season.

In January 2015, Kostner received a 16-month ban from competition after she admitted lying about the location of her then boyfriend Alex Schwazer to help him avoid a drug test. On 5 October 2015, the Court of Arbitration for Sport (CAS) announced Kostner had agreed to a demand by Italian doping officials to increase the suspension to 21 months but to backdate the start of the ban to 1 April 2014. Kostner was therefore eligible to compete from 1 January 2016. She participated in an ISU sanctioned pro-am competition, Medal Winners Open, in January 2016.

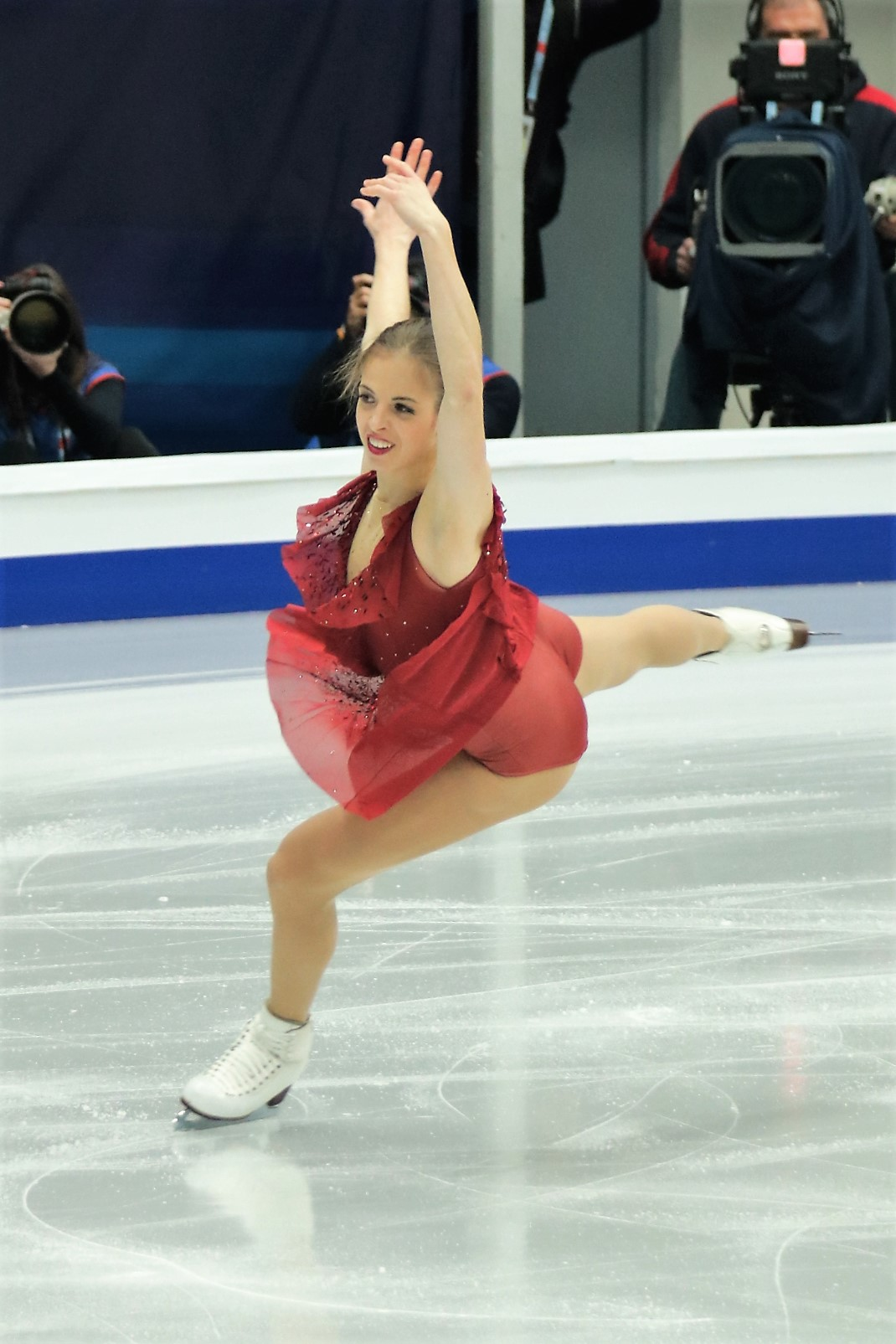
Kostner at the 2018 Europeans

=== 2016–2017 season ===
In November 2016, Kostner announced her intention to return to competitive skating with Alexei Mishin as her coach. She stated, "I don't feel any interest in other medals or results, really. But I feel a deep interest in learning what I've not learned yet. That's why I asked Mr. Mishin if I could train with him, at times."

She made her season debut at the 2016 CS Golden Spin of Zagreb, winning the gold medal. She was awarded the bronze medal at the 2017 European Championships in Ostrava, Czech Republic. At the 2017 World Championships in Helsinki, Finland, Kostner placed 8th in the short program, 5th in the free program and 6th overall.

=== 2017–2018 season ===
Kostner's assigned events for the 2017-18 Grand Prix series were the NHK Trophy and the Rostelecom Cup. She finished 2nd at both events, qualifying her for the Grand Prix Final, where she was fourth. In January 2018, she won her 11th medal at the European Championships, a bronze, an event record for a singles skater.

At the 2018 Olympic Games, Kostner competed in the team event and contributed to Italy's fourth-place finish, placing second in the short program and fourth in the long program, In the individual ladies' event, she placed sixth in the short program and fifth in the long program, finishing fifth overall. After the competition, she was selected as the flag bearer for the closing ceremonies. In an interview, she announced her intention to compete at the World Championships, held in Milan, and stated that she had not yet decided when she would retire from competitive skating.

Kostner skated a new personal best score of 80.27 in the short program at the 2018 World Championships, taking first place. In the free skate, however, she made several errors, popping two jumps and falling on an attempted triple Salchow. As a result, she finished fifth in the free skate and fourth overall.

=== 2018–2019 season ===
In September, Kostner withdrew from the Japan Open. In October, she withdrew from both of her Grand Prix events – 2018 Grand Prix of Helsinki and 2018 Internationaux de France – due to pain in her left hip and inflammation of the proximal tendon of the "left rectus femoris muscle".

At the end of December, she broke the silence to announce that she was still struggling with the after effects of her hip injury and wouldn't go to the Europeans, but aimed at appearing at the Worlds in March. Later, she announced that she would not be competing at the 2019 World Figure Skating Championships.

== Post-competitive career ==
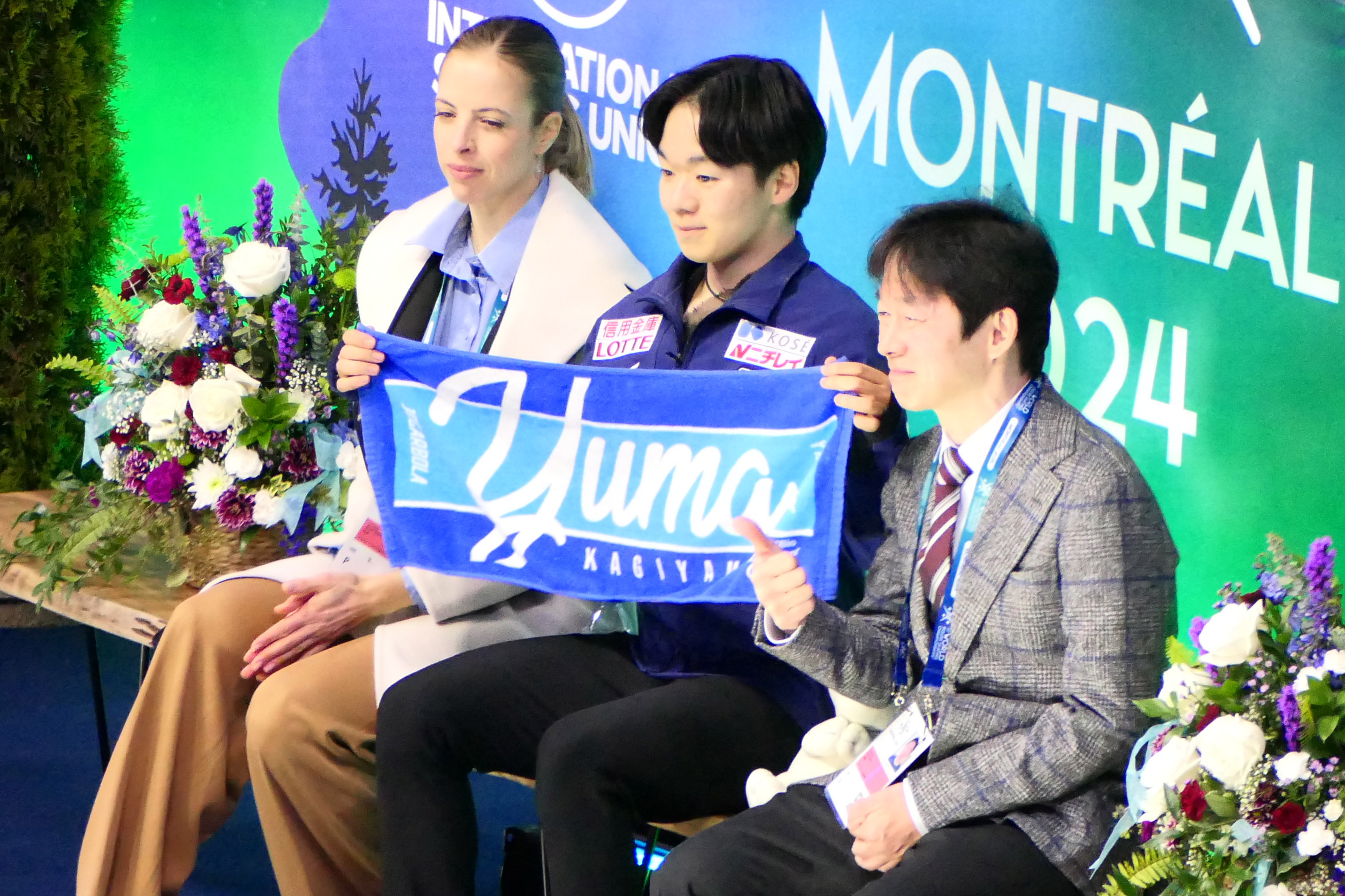
Kostner (far left) with Yuma Kagiyama at the 2024 World Championships

Following Kostner's competitive figure skating career, she began working alongside her longtime choreographer, Lori Nichol, to help choreograph competitive figure skating programs. Her clients have included:

- (United States) Sarah Everhardt
- (Italy) Rebecca Ghilardi / Filippo Ambrosini
- (Japan) Yuma Kagiyama
- (South Korea) Lee Hae-in
- (United States) Isabeau Levito
- (Germany) Nicole Schott

In summer 2023, she also joined Kagiyama's coaching team.

== Endorsements and shows ==
Kostner's current and former sponsors include Alto Adige/Südtirol, Asics, Grissin Bon, Lancia, Herbalife (from 2010 to 2011 season), Torino Olympic park, and Roberto Cavalli (until 2009–10 season). Kostner's current and former official suppliers include Maybelline, L'Oréal Professionnel, Fratelli Rossetti, Damiani, Swarovski, Iceberg, and T-SHIRT T-SHOPS.

Kostner designed her own costumes from 2010 to 2014. She worked with Roberto Cavalli in 2005. She performed in the show Winx On Ice from November 2008 and in Opera on Ice, held in October 2011 at the Arena of Verona, which was broadcast simultaneously in 40 countries worldwide.

== Programs ==
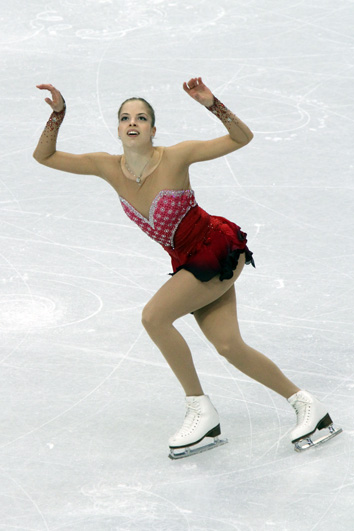
Kostner performs at the 2010 Olympics

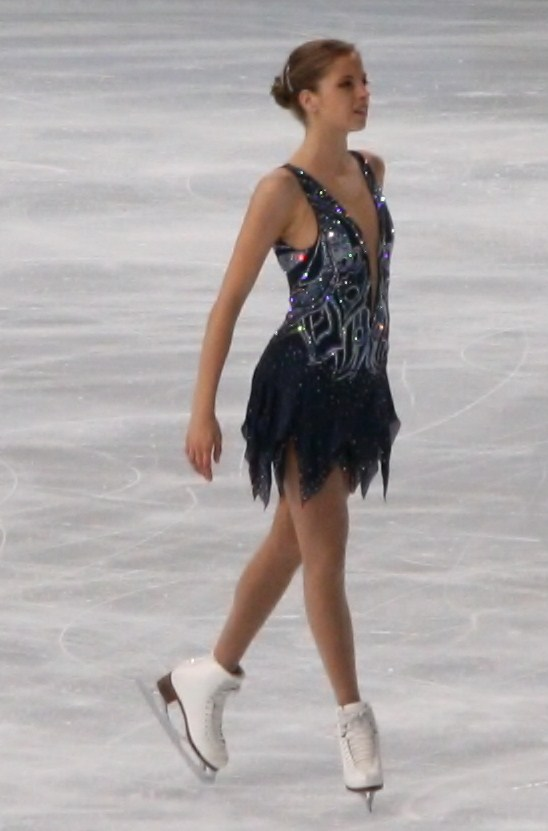
Kostner performs at the 2011 Trophée Eric Bompard

Season	Short program	Free skating	Exhibition
2018–2019	Ne me quitte pas by Celine Dion choreo. by Lori Nichol	The Storm by Balázs Havasi choreo. by Lori Nichol	
2017–2018	Ne me quitte pas by Celine Dion choreo. by Lori Nichol	Prélude à l'après-midi d'un faune by Claude Debussy choreo. by Lori Nichol	Volevo scriverti da tanto by Mina; Clair de lune by Claude Debussy choreo. by Stéphane Lambiel
2016–2017	God of Thunder by Kitarō; Bonzo's Montreux by John Bonham (Led Zeppelin) choreo. by Lori Nichol	Nisi Dominus (Cum Dederit) by Antonio Vivaldi choreo. by Lori Nichol	Clair de lune by Claude Debussy choreo. by Stéphane Lambiel
2015–2016		Méditation (Thaïs) by Jules Massenet choreo. by Lori Nichol	Summertime from Porgy and Bess by George Gershwin; Una furtiva lagrima from L'elisir d'amore by Gaetano Donizetti; Adagio in G minor by Tomaso Albinoni choreo. by Stéphane Lambiel
2014–2015	Did not compete this season		Bonzo's Montreux by Led Zeppelin choreo. by Lori Nichol; Waltz in C-sharp minor, Op. 64, No. 2 by Frédéric Chopin choreo. by Salomé Brunner; Nei by Ganes choreo. by Chiara Tanesini
2013–2014	Ave Maria by Franz Schubert choreo. by Lori Nichol; Humoresque by Antonín Dvořák choreo. by Lori Nichol	Boléro by Maurice Ravel performed by André Previn and the London Symphony Orchestra choreo. by Lori Nichol; Scheherazade by Nikolai Rimsky-Korsakov choreo. by Lori Nichol	Scheherazade by Nikolai Rimsky-Korsakov choreo. by Lori Nichol; Imagine by Eva Cassidy choreo. by Lori Nichol
2012–2013	A Transylvanian Lullaby (from Young Frankenstein) by John Morris performed by Gil Shaham, Jonathan Feldman; Devil's Trill by Giuseppe Tartini performed by Angele Dubeau & La Pietà choreo. by Lori Nichol	Boléro by Maurice Ravel performed by André Previn and the London Symphony Orchestra choreo. by Lori Nichol	It's Oh So Quiet performed by Björk
2011–2012	Allegretto from Piano Trio No. 2 by Dmitri Shostakovich choreo. by Lori Nichol	Piano Concerto No. 23 by Wolfgang Amadeus Mozart choreo. by Lori Nichol	Hallelujah by Jeff Buckley; Carmen by Georges Bizet choreo. by Stéphane Lambiel
2010–2011	Galicia Flamenco by Gino d'Auri choreo. by Lori Nichol	Prélude à l'après-midi d'un faune by Claude Debussy choreo. by Lori Nichol	Mein Herr by Liza Minnelli; Heavy Cross by Gossip
2009–2010	Nocturne No. 20 in c-sharp minor by Frédéric Chopin; Violin Concerto by Pyotr Tchaikovsky choreo. by Lori Nichol	Air on the G String by Johann Sebastian Bach; Concerto for 2 Cellos in g minor, RV 531 Antonio Vivaldi choreo. by Lori Nichol	Ain't No Sunshine by Bill Withers performed by Carol Duboc
2008–2009	Mujer Sola; Canaro en Paris by Tango Lorca choreo. by Lori Nichol	"Dumky" Trio by Antonín Dvořák choreo. by Lori Nichol; Black Swan Pas de Deux from Swan Lake by Pyotr Tchaikovsky choreo. by Lori Nichol	A Te by Jovanotti; Come Sei Veramente; Angelo Ribelle by Giovanni Allevi
2007–2008	Riders on the Storm by The Doors choreo. by Lori Nichol	"Dumky" Trio by Antonín Dvořák choreo. by Lori Nichol	Panic by Giovanni Allevi; You Are A Woman by Bonnie Tyler
2006–2007	Variations on the Canon in D by George Winston choreo. by Lori Nichol	Memoirs of a Geisha by John Williams choreo. by Lori Nichol	Solamente per Carolina by Robert Werner
2005–2006	Gabriel's Oboe (from The Mission) by Ennio Morricone choreo. by Kurt Browning	Winter (from The Four Seasons) by Antonio Vivaldi choreo. by Kurt Browning	Ave Maria by Charles Gounod, Filippa Giordano
2004–2005	Country by George Winston choreo. by Kurt Browning	Piano Concerto No. 1; Piano Concerto No. 3 by Sergei Prokofiev choreo. by Kurt Browning	Fly by Celine Dion
2003–2004	Song from a Secret Garden by Rolf Løvland	A Poet's Quest for a Distant Paradise; Night Flight; Reflection; Violin Fantasy on Puccini's Turandot by Vanessa-Mae	Je t'aime encore by Celine Dion
2002–2003	Variations on the Canon in D by George Winston arranged by George Winston	Papa, Can You Hear Me?; Schindler's List; Far and Away by Itzhak Perlman	But I Do Love You The Right Kind of Wrong by LeAnn Rimes
2000–2001	American Beauty by Thomas Newman; True Romance by Hans Zimmer	Azul; Cansion Triste by Jesse Cook; Gypsy Music	

== Competitive highlights ==
GP: Grand Prix; CS: Challenger Series; JGP: Junior Grand Prix

International
Event	00–01	01–02	02–03	03–04	04–05	05–06	06–07	07–08	08–09	09–10	10–11	11–12	12–13	13–14	14–15	15–16	16–17	17–18
Olympics						9th				16th				3rd				5th
Worlds			10th	5th	3rd	12th	6th	2nd	12th	6th	3rd	1st	2nd	3rd			6th	4th
Europeans			4th	5th	7th	3rd	1st	1st	2nd	1st	2nd	1st	1st	3rd			3rd	3rd
GP Final								3rd	3rd		2nd	1st						4th
GP Cup of China								3rd		6th		1st		3rd				
GP Finland																		
GP France					2nd					6th		2nd						
GP NHK Trophy						6th		1st			1st							2nd
GP Rostelecom Cup				2nd	7th				1st					2nd				2nd
GP Skate America				9th							3rd	2nd						
GP Skate Canada					5th	7th			4th									
CS Finlandia																		2nd
CS Golden Spin																	1st	
CS Lombardia																		3rd
Nebelhorn Trophy			1st					1st										
Bofrost Cup				4th														
Finlandia Trophy				4th				3rd										
Gardena Trophy		4th									1st							
Golden Spin													1st					
Int. Challenge Cup												1st	1st					
Karl Schäfer									1st									
Merano Cup										1st								
Nordics																	1st	
Ondrej Nepela			1st															
International: Junior
Junior Worlds	11th	10th	3rd															
JGP Final			2nd															
JGP China			4th															
JGP France			1st															
JGP Germany	7th																	
JGP Italy		6th																
JGP Norway	9th																	
JGP Poland		4th																
Dragon Trophy			1st															
National
Italian Champ.	1st J.		1st	2nd	1st	1st	1st	WD	1st	2nd	1st	WD	1st				1st	1st
Team events
Olympics														4th T				4th T
World Team; Trophy												6th T 2nd P						

Pro-am events
Event	2015–16
Medal Winners Open	2nd

== Detailed results ==
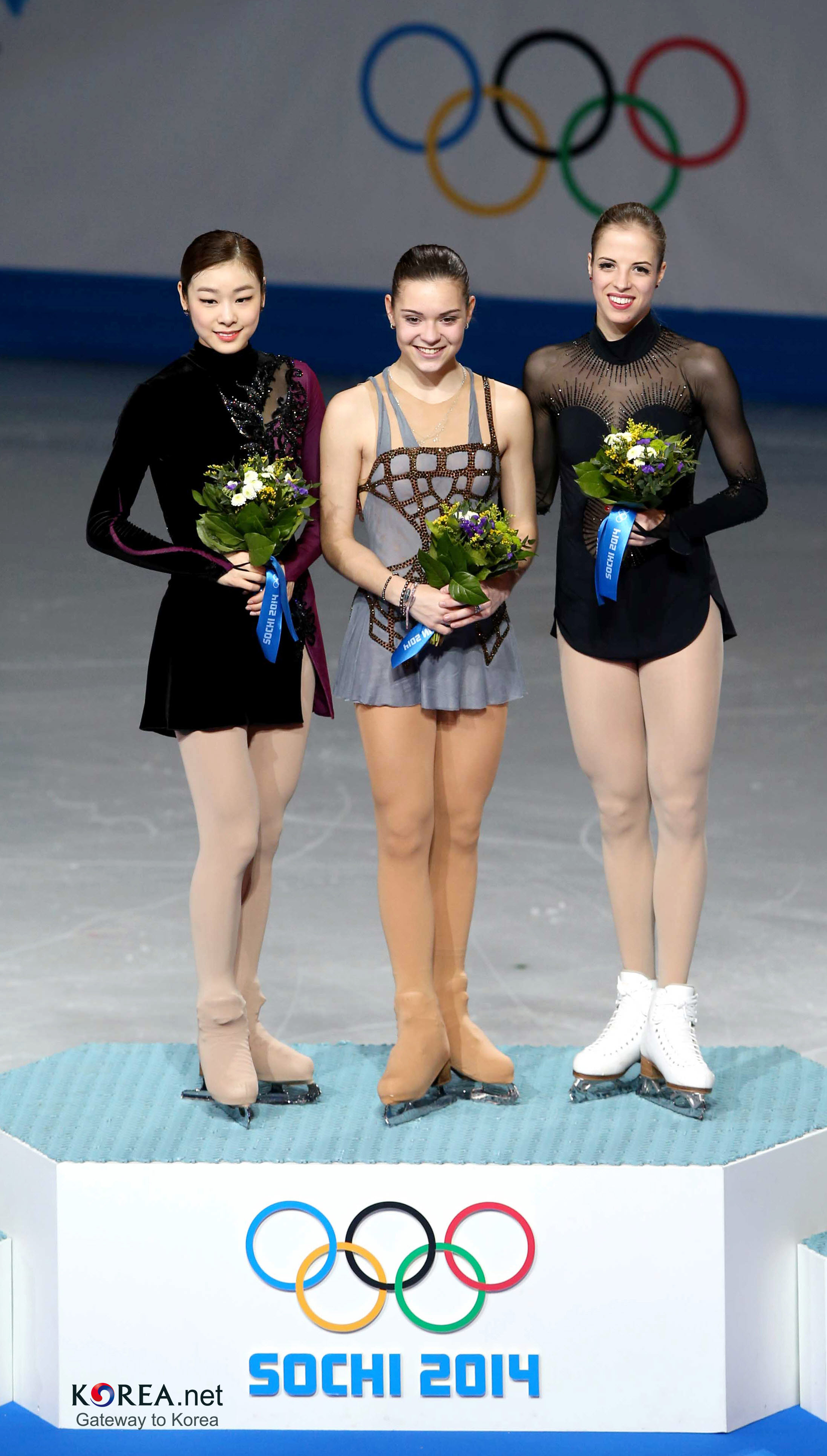
Kostner (right) at the podium in 2014 Sochi Olympics.

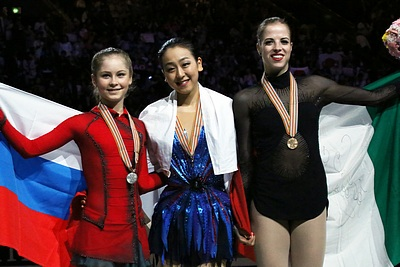
Kostner with Lipnitskaya (left) and Mao Asada (center) at the 2014 World Championships podium

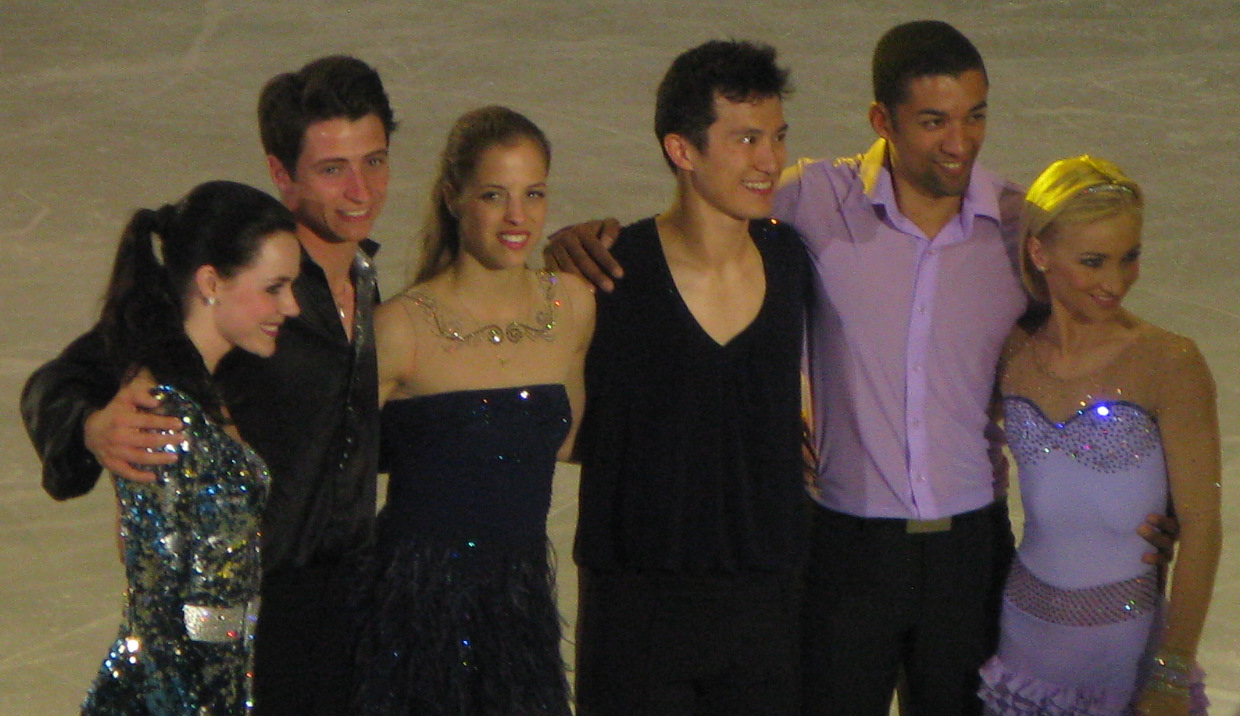
Kostner (center left) with the 2012 World Championships gold medalists

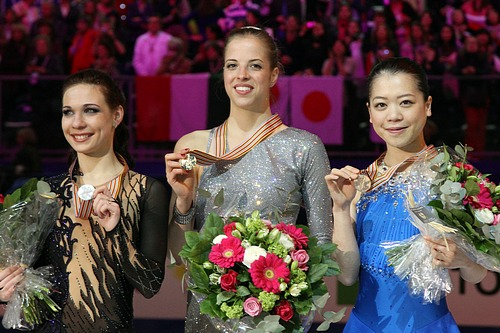
Kostner at the 2012 World Championships.

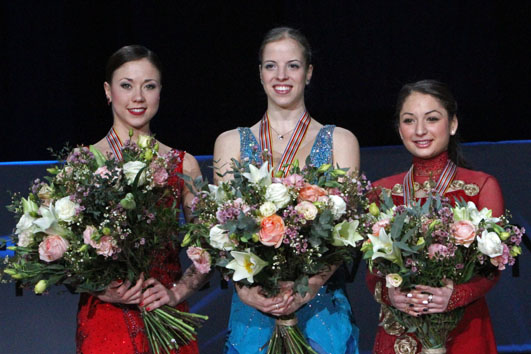
Kostner at the 2010 European Championships

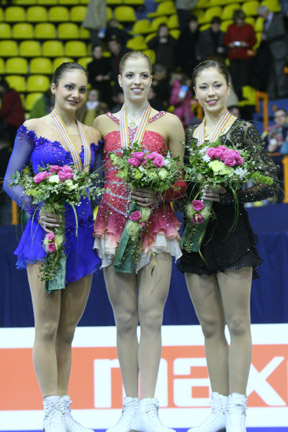
Kostner at the 2008 European Championships

ISU personal best scores in the +3/-3 GOE System
Segment	Type	Score	Event
Total	TSS	216.73	2014 Winter Olympics
Short program	TSS	80.27	2018 World Championships
Short program	TES	41.30	2018 World Championships
Short program	PCS	38.97	2018 World Championships
Free skating	TSS	142.61	2014 Winter Olympics
Free skating	TES	68.84	2014 Winter Olympics
Free skating	PCS	75.71	2017 NHK Trophy

Small medals for short program and free skating awarded only at ISU Championships. At team events, medals awarded only for team results.

2017–18 season
Date	Event	SP	FS	Total
19–25 March 2018	2018 World Championships	1; 80.27	5; 128.61	4; 208.88
15–23 February 2018	2018 Winter Olympics	6; 73.15	5; 139.29	5; 212.44
9–12 February 2018	2018 Winter Olympics (team event)	2; 75.10	4; 134.00	4T
15–21 January 2018	2018 European Championships	3; 78.30	4; 125.95	3; 204.25
13–16 December 2017	2018 Italian Championships	1; 81.91	1; 140.43	1; 222.34
7–10 December 2017	2017–18 Grand Prix Final	6; 72.82	3; 141.83	4; 214.65
10–12 November 2017	2017 NHK Trophy	2; 74.57	3; 137.67	2; 212.24
20–22 October 2017	2017 Rostelecom Cup	2; 74.62	2; 141.36	2; 215.98
6–8 October 2017	2017 CS Finlandia Trophy	3; 67.45	2; 126.31	2; 193.76
14–17 September 2017	2017 CS Lombardia Trophy	2; 71.67	5; 126.69	3; 198.36
2016–17 season
Date	Event	SP	FS	Total
29 March – 2 April 2017	2017 World Championships	8; 66.33	5; 130.50	6; 196.83
2–5 March 2017	2017 Nordic Championships	1; 64.85	1; 139.42	1; 204.27
25–29 January 2017	2017 European Championships	3; 72.40	2; 138.12	3; 210.52
14–17 December 2016	2017 Italian Championships	1; 74.27	1; 136.70	1; 210.97
8–11 December 2016	2016 Golden Spin of Zagreb	1; 69.95	3; 126.28	1; 196.23
2013–14 season
Date	Event	SP	FS	Total
24–30 March 2014	2014 World Championships	2; 77.24	6; 126.59	3; 203.83
7–23 February 2014	2014 Winter Olympics	3; 74.12	4; 142.61	3; 216.73
7–23 February 2014	2014 Winter Olympics (team event)	2; 70.84	–	4T
13–19 January 2014	2014 European Championships	3; 68.97	3; 122.42	3; 191.39
22–24 November 2013	2013 Rostelecom Cup	2; 67.74	1; 122.38	2; 190.12
1–3 November 2013	2013 Cup of China	2; 62.75	2; 110.65	3; 173.40
2012–13 season
Date	Event	SP	FS	Total
10–17 March 2013	2013 World Championships	2; 66.86	3; 131.03	2; 197.89
21–24 February 2013	2013 Challenge Cup	1; 72.81	1; 126.09	1; 198.90
21–27 January 2013	2013 European Championships	2; 64.19	2; 130.52	1; 194.71
19–22 December 2012	2013 Italian Championships	1; 70.13	1; 143.56	1; 213.69
13–16 December 2012	2012 Golden Spin of Zagreb	1; 64.99	1; 110.03	1; 175.02
2011–12 season
Date	Event	SP	FS	Total
18–22 April 2012	2012 ISU World Team Trophy	1; 69.48	3; 116.24	6T / 2P; 185.72
26 March – 1 April 2012	2012 World Championships	3; 61.00	1; 128.94	1; 189.94
8–11 March 2012	2012 Challenge Cup	1; 64.89	1; 132.84	1; 197.73
23–29 January 2012	2012 European Championships	1; 63.22	1; 120.33	1; 183.55
8–11 December 2011	2011–12 Grand Prix Final	1; 66.43	1; 121.05	1; 187.48
17–20 November 2011	2011 Trophée Eric Bompard	2; 59.70	3; 119.62	2; 179.32
3–6 November 2011	2011 Cup of China	1; 61.88	1; 120.26	1; 182.14
20–23 October 2011	2011 Skate America	2; 60.23	1; 117.12	2; 177.35
2010–11 season
Date	Event	SP	FS	Total
25 April – 1 May 2011	2011 World Championships	6; 59.75	3; 124.93	3; 184.68
1 March – 3 April 2011	2011 Gardena Spring Trophy	1; 58.24	1; 109.76	1; 168.00
24–30 January 2011	2011 European Championships	6; 53.17	1; 115.37	2; 168.54
16–19 December 2010	2011 Italian Championships	1; 65.52	1; 124.22	1; 189.74
8–12 December 2010	2010–11 Grand Prix Final	2; 62.13	4; 116.47	2; 178.60
11–14 November 2010	2010 Skate America	1; 60.28	6; 94.59	3; 154.87
21–24 October 2010	2010 NHK Trophy	1; 57.27	2; 107.34	1; 164.61
2009–10 season
Date	Event	SP	FS	Total
22–28 March 2010	2010 World Championships	4; 62.20	5; 115.11	6; 177.31
12–27 February 2010	2010 Winter Olympics	7; 63.02	19; 88.88	16; 151.90
18–24 January 2010	2010 European Championships	1; 65.80	1; 107.66	1; 173.46
17–20 December 2009	2010 Italian Championships	2; 53.26	2; 102.42	2; 155.68
12–15 November 2009	2009 Merano Cup	1; 58.17	1; 109.23	1; 167.40
29 Oct. – 1 Nov. 2009	2009 Cup of China	3; 61.12	7; 93.06	6; 154.18
15–18 October 2009	2009 Trophée Eric Bompard	7; 51.26	4; 96.37	6; 147.63
2008–09 season
Date	Event	SP	FS	Total
23–29 March 2009	2009 World Championships	5; 63.18	15; 90.38	12; 153.56
20–25 January 2009	2009 European Championships	3; 51.36	1; 114.06	2; 165.42
18–21 December 2008	2009 Italian Championships	1; 58.54	1; 112.55	1; 171.09
10–14 December 2008	2008–09 Grand Prix Final	4; 55.88	4; 112.13	3; 168.01
20–23 November 2008	2008 Cup of Russia	2; 57.02	1; 113.70	1; 170.72
30 Oct. – 2 Nov. 2008	2008 Skate Canada International	7; 48.56	4; 104.20	4; 152.76
14–17 October 2008	2008 Karl Schäfer Memorial	3; 50.59	1; 93.07	1; 143.66
2007–08 season
Date	Event	SP	FS	Total
17–23 March 2008	2008 World Championships	1; 64.28	3; 120.40	2; 184.68
21–27 January 2008	2008 European Championships	1; 59.31	2; 111.97	1; 171.28
13–16 December 2007	2007–08 Grand Prix Final	3; 59.86	3; 119.07	3; 178.93
28 Nov. – 2 Dec. 2007	2007 NHK Trophy	1; 61.24	2; 103.45	1; 164.69
7–11 November 2007	2007 Cup of China	1; 60.82	4; 83.04	3; 143.86
12–14 October 2007	2007 Finlandia Trophy	1; 58.54	4; 97.33	3; 155.87
27–30 September 2007	2007 Nebelhorn Trophy	1; 60.15	1; 113.38	1; 173.53
2006–07 season
Date	Event	SP	FS	Total
20–25 March 2007	2007 World Championships	3; 67.15	9; 101.77	6; 168.92
22–28 January 2007	2007 European Championships	2; 60.46	1; 114.33	1; 174.79
4–7 January 2007	2007 Italian Championships	1; 60.54	1; 106.19	1; 166.73

2005–06 season
Date	Event	QR	SP	FS	Total
19–26 March 2006	2006 World Championships	4; 25.64	16; 48.95	11; 97.86	12; 172.45
10–26 February 2006	2006 Winter Olympics	–	11; 53.77	9; 99.73	9; 153.50
17–22 January 2006	2006 European Championships	–	5; 60.04	3; 112.41	3; 172.45
5–8 January 2006	2006 Italian Championships	–	1; 57.84	1; 107.14	1; 164.98
1–4 December 2005	2005 NHK Trophy	–	1; 58.64	7; 86.78	6; 145.42
27–30 October 2005	2005 Skate Canada International	–	5; 49.46	8; 83.18	7; 132.64
2004–05 season
Date	Event	QR	SP	FS	Total
14–20 March 2005	2005 World Championships	3; 26.45	4; 60.82	4; 113.29	3; 200.56
25–30 January 2005	2005 European Championships	–	7; 49.29	7; 93.42	7; 142.71
6–9 January 2005	2005 Italian Championships	–	1	1	1
25–28 November 2004	2004 Cup of Russia	–	2; 57.50	10; 71.42	7; 128.92
18–21 November 2004	2004 Trophée Eric Bompard	–	2; 53.72	3; 89.78	2; 143.50
28–31 October 2004	2004 Skate Canada International	–	4; 50.86	5; 88.08	5; 138.94
2003–04 season
Date	Event	QR	SP	FS	Total
22–28 March 2004	2004 World Championships	6	5	6	5
2–8 February 2004	2004 European Championships	–	5	5	5
16–18 January 2004	2004 Italian Championships	–	1	2	2
20–23 November 2003	2003 Cup of Russia	–	6; 45.38	1; 98.15	2; 143.53
23–26 October 2003	2003 Skate America	–	7; 49.22	10; 78.07	9; 127.29
9–12 October 2003	2003 Finlandia Trophy	–	2	4	4

2002–03 season
Date	Event	Level	QR	SP	FS	scopTotal
24–30 March 2003	2003 World Championships	Senior	9	4	11	10
24 February – 2 March 2003	2003 World Junior Championships	Junior	1	1	5	3
20–26 January 2003	2003 European Championships	Senior	3	7	4	4
3–5 January 2003	2003 Italian Championships	Senior	–			1
12–15 December 2002	2002–03 JGP Final	Junior	–	2	3	2
17–20 October 2002	2002–03 JGP China	Junior	–	6	3	4
26–29 September 2002	2002 Ondrej Nepela Memorial	Senior	–	2	1	1
4–7 September 2002	2002 Nebelhorn Trophy	Senior	–	2	1	1
21–25 August 2002	2002–03 JGP France	Junior	–	1	1	1
2001–02 season
Date	Event	Level	QR	SP	FS	Total
3–10 March 2002	2002 World Junior Championships	Junior	10	9	8	10
7–11 November 2001	2001–02 JGP Italy	Junior	–	9	5	6
11–14 October 2001	2001–02 JGP Netherlands	Junior	–	4	5	4
2000–01 season
Date	Event	Level	QR	SP	FS	Total
26 February – 2 March 2001	2001 World Junior Championships	Junior	9	13	9	11
12–14 January 2001	2001 Italian Championships	Junior	–	1	1	1
2–5 November 2000	2000–01 JGP Norway	Junior	–	10	8	9
5–8 October 2000	2000–01 JGP Czech Republic	Junior	–	11	7	7

Winter Olympics
Preceded by Isolde Kostner	Flag bearer for Italy; 2006 Turin	Succeeded by Giorgio Di Centa
