= Justin Pekarek =

American ice dancer

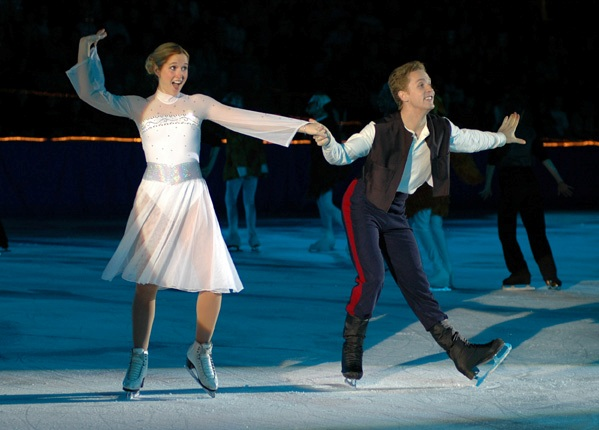
- Hilary Gibbons and Justin Pekarek performing with Act I of Boston

Personal information
- Born: August 26, 1981 (age 45) Valencia, California, U.S.
- Height: 5 ft 9 in (1.75 m)

Figure skating career
- Country: United States
Medal record
Ice dancing
Representing the United States
Four Continents Championships
Bronze medal – third place	2000 Osaka	Ice dancing
World Junior Championships
Gold medal – first place	1999 Zagreb	Ice dancing

Justin Pekarek (born August 26, 1981) is an American former competitive ice dancer. With Jamie Silverstein, he is the 2000 Four Continents bronze medalist and 1999 World Junior champion.

== Personal life ==
Pekarek was born on August 26, 1981, in Valencia, California, the son of a General Motors executive. He and ice dancer Hilary Gibbons were married in January 2008, but had divorced by November 2016. Their son, Cooper Joseph, was born on September 1, 2011.

Pekarek has a Bachelor of Science degree in mechanical engineering from the University of Massachusetts Lowell and worked in plastics design before switching to a career as a real estate broker.

== Career ==
Silverstein and Pekarek won the 1999 World Junior and U.S. Junior titles.

The next season, Silverstein and Pekarek moved up to the senior level. They won gold at the 1999 Nebelhorn Trophy, silver at the 2000 U.S. Championships, and bronze at the 2000 Four Continents. They announced their split on January 10, 2001.

Pekarek teamed up with Hilary Gibbons for several years. They won bronze at the 2003 Karl Schäfer Memorial.

Pekarek coached and competed with the Theatre on Ice team Act I of Boston at the Skating Club of Boston. He and Gibbons coached competitive ice dance teams to national titles at the juvenile, intermediate, and novice level. Pekarek retired from coaching in 2008.

== Programs ==
(with Silverstein)

Season	Original dance	Free dance
1999–2000	I Like It Like That; Eres Todo en Mí; I Like It Like That	Iieee (from From the Choirgirl Hotel) by Tori Amos; Great Expectations; Estella's Theme by Patrick Doyle; Siren by Tori Amos
1998–99	My Sweet and Tender Beast by Eugen Doga	

== Competitive highlights ==
GP: Grand Prix; JGP: Junior Series / Junior Grand Prix

=== With Gibbons ===
International
Event	2002–03	2003–04
Schäfer Memorial		3rd
National
U.S. Championships	9th	7th

=== With Silverstein ===
International
Event	96–97	97–98	98–99	99–00
World Champ.				12th
Four Continents Champ.				3rd
GP Skate America				5th
GP Sparkassen Cup				4th
Nebelhorn Trophy				1st
International: Junior
World Junior Champ.		10th	1st	
JGP Final		6th	1st	
JGP Bulgaria		2nd		
JGP France			2nd	
JGP Germany		3rd	1st	
National
U.S. Championships	3rd J	2nd J	1st J	2nd
Levels: N = Novice; J = Junior
