= Jamie Silverstein =

American ice dancer

Personal information
- Born: December 23, 1983 (age 42) Pittsburgh, Pennsylvania, U.S.
- Height: 5 ft 3 in (1.60 m)

Figure skating career
- Country: United States
- Skating club: Arctic FSC
- Retired: 2006
Medal record
Figure skating: Ice dancing
Representing the United States
Four Continents Championships
Bronze medal – third place	2000 Osaka	Ice dancing
World Junior Championships
Gold medal – first place	1999 Zagreb	Ice dancing

Jamie Silverstein (born December 23, 1983) is an American former competitive ice dancer. With Justin Pekarek, she is the 2000 Four Continents bronze medalist, the 1999 World Junior champion, and 2000 U.S. silver medalist. With Ryan O'Meara, she is the 2006 U.S. bronze medalist and competed at the 2006 Winter Olympics.

== Early life ==
Silverstein was born in Pittsburgh, Pennsylvania. She grew up in Mt. Lebanon, Pennsylvania, near Pittsburgh. After her parents divorced when she was 11, she moved with her mother to Michigan.

== Skating career ==
Early in her career, Silverstein competed with Justin Pekarek. They won the 1999 World Junior and U.S. Junior titles. The next season, they moved up to the senior level. They won gold at the 1999 Nebelhorn Trophy, silver at the 2000 U.S. Championships, and bronze at the 2000 Four Continents. They announced their split on January 10, 2001. Silverstein later revealed that she had battled eating disorders, anorexia and bulimia, during her career.

Silverstein trained briefly with Brandon Forsyth but never competed with him. She left competitive skating for a period and attended Cornell University. She was off the ice completely for two years, stepping onto the ice again in late 2004. Silverstein decided to make a return to competition. In April 2005, she began training with Ryan O'Meara. They won the bronze medal at the 2006 U.S. Championships and qualified for the 2006 Winter Olympics. They were coached by Igor Shpilband and Marina Zueva in Canton, Michigan.

On May 3, 2006, Silverstein and O'Meara announced that they would take time off from competitive skating, with Silverstein planning to return to school.

== Later life and career ==
In 2008, Silverstein graduated from Cornell University with a degree as a College Scholar, choosing to specialize in catharsis and emotional psychology. Her thesis work involved a performance piece whose subject was Ekman's six basic emotions. Now she works as a yoga instructor and is an advocate in eating disorder recovery. She also maintains a blog.

In 2012, Silverstein opened a yoga studio, The Grinning Yogi, in Seattle.

== Programs ==
=== With O'Meara ===
Season	Original dance	Free dance
2005–06	Salsa: Round the World; Rhumba: Sweet the Sting; Cha Cha	Nu Tango

=== With Pekarek ===
Season	Original dance	Free dance
1999–2000	I Like It Like That; Eres Todo en Mí; I Like It Like That	Iieee (from From the Choirgirl Hotel) by Tori Amos; Great Expectations; Estella's Theme by Patrick Doyle; Siren by Tori Amos
1998–99	My Sweet and Tender Beast by Eugen Doga	

== Competitive highlights ==
GP: Grand Prix; JGP: Junior Series / Junior Grand Prix

=== With O'Meara ===
International
Event	2005–06
Winter Olympics	16th
Four Continents Champ.	6th
GP Skate America	5th
National
U.S. Championships	3rd

=== With Pekarek ===
International
Event	96–97	97–98	98–99	99–00
World Champ.				12th
Four Continents Champ.				3rd
GP Skate America				5th
GP Sparkassen Cup				4th
Nebelhorn Trophy				1st
International: Junior
World Junior Champ.		10th	1st	
JGP Final		6th	1st	
JGP Bulgaria		2nd		
JGP France			2nd	
JGP Germany		3rd	1st	
National
U.S. Championships	3rd J	2nd J	1st J	2nd

== See also ==
- List of select Jewish figure skaters
