= 2002 Nebelhorn Trophy =

- Type: Senior International
- Date: September 4 – 7
- Season: 2002–03
- Location: Oberstdorf
- Venue: Bundesleistungszentrum Oberstdorf

Champions
- Men's singles: (Belarus) Sergei Davydov
- Ladies' singles: (Italy) Carolina Kostner
- Pairs: (Canada) Valérie Marcoux / Craig Buntin
- Ice dance: (Italy) Federica Faiella / Massimo Scali
- Previous: 2001 Nebelhorn Trophy
- Next: 2003 Nebelhorn Trophy

The 2002 Nebelhorn Trophy took place between September 4 and 7, 2002 at the Bundesleistungszentrum Oberstdorf. It is an international senior-level figure skating competition organized by the Deutsche Eislauf-Union and held annually in Oberstdorf, Germany. The competition is named after the Nebelhorn, a nearby mountain.

Skaters were entered by their respective national federations, rather than receiving individual invitations as in the Grand Prix of Figure Skating, and competed in four disciplines: men's singles, ladies' singles, pair skating, and ice dance. The Fritz-Geiger-Memorial Trophy was presented to the country with the highest placements across all disciplines.

== Results ==
=== Men ===
| Rank | Name | Nation | TFP | SP | FS |
|---|---|---|---|---|---|
| 1 | Sergei Davydov | Belarus | 2.5 | 1 | 2 |
| 2 | Benjamin Miller | United States | 3.0 | 4 | 1 |
| 3 | Fedor Andreev | Canada | 4.0 | 2 | 3 |
| 4 | Justin Dillon | United States | 5.5 | 3 | 4 |
| 5 | Filip Stiller | Sweden | 10.0 | 8 | 6 |
| 6 | Trifun Zivanovic | Yugoslavia | 10.5 | 11 | 5 |
| 7 | James Black | United Kingdom | 10.5 | 7 | 7 |
| 8 | Silvio Smalun | Germany | 11.0 | 6 | 8 |
| 9 | Kristoffer Berntsson | Sweden | 11.5 | 5 | 9 |
| 10 | Alexei Kozlov | Estonia | 15.0 | 10 | 10 |
| 11 | Tomáš Verner | Czech Republic | 17.5 | 13 | 11 |
| 12 | Maciej Kuś | Poland | 17.5 | 9 | 13 |
| 13 | Gregor Urbas | Slovenia | 18.0 | 12 | 12 |
| 14 | Clemens Brummer | Germany | 21.0 | 14 | 14 |
| 15 | Michael Ganser | Germany | 22.5 | 15 | 15 |
| 16 | Bartosz Domański | Poland | 24.0 | 16 | 16 |
| 17 | Andrej Primak | Germany | 25.5 | 17 | 17 |

=== Ladies ===
| Rank | Name | Nation | TFP | SP | FS |
|---|---|---|---|---|---|
| 1 | Carolina Kostner | Italy | 2.0 | 2 | 1 |
| 2 | Alisa Drei | Finland | 3.5 | 3 | 2 |
| 3 | Liudmila Nelidina | Russia | 3.5 | 1 | 3 |
| 4 | Amber Corwin | United States | 6.0 | 4 | 4 |
| 5 | Christiane Berger | Germany | 8.5 | 7 | 5 |
| 6 | Nadine Gosselin | Germany | 11.0 | 10 | 6 |
| 7 | Joan Cristobal | United States | 11.5 | 9 | 7 |
| 8 | Miia Marttinen | Finland | 12.0 | 6 | 9 |
| 9 | Jenna McCorkell | United Kingdom | 12.5 | 5 | 10 |
| 10 | Sara Falotico | Belgium | 14.5 | 13 | 8 |
| 11 | Tuğba Karademir | Turkey | 16.5 | 11 | 11 |
| 12 | Stefanie Lotterschmid | Germany | 18.0 | 12 | 12 |
| 13 | Tina Svajger | Slovenia | 20.0 | 14 | 13 |
| WD | Caroline Gülke | Germany | | 8 | |
| WD | Anny Hou | Chinese Taipei | | 15 | |
| WD | Kristel Popovich | Yugoslavia | | 16 | |

=== Pairs ===
| Rank | Name | Nation | TFP | SP | FS |
|---|---|---|---|---|---|
| 1 | Valérie Marcoux / Craig Buntin | Canada | 1.5 | 1 | 1 |
| 2 | Julia Obertas / Alexei Sokolov | Latvia | 3.0 | 2 | 2 |
| 3 | Kathryn Orscher / Garrett Lucash | United States | 4.5 | 3 | 3 |
| 4 | Eva-Maria Fitze / Rico Rex | Germany | 6.0 | 4 | 4 |
| 5 | Larisa Spielberg / Craig Joeright | United States | 7.5 | 5 | 5 |
| 6 | Molly Quigley / Bert Cording | United States | 9.0 | 6 | 6 |
| 7 | Andrea Vargova / Marek Sedlmajer | Czech Republic | 10.5 | 7 | 7 |
| 8 | Nicole Nönning / Matthias Bleyer | Germany | 12.0 | 8 | 8 |

=== Ice dance ===
| Rank | Name | Nation | TFP | CD | OD | FD |
|---|---|---|---|---|---|---|
| 1 | Federica Faiella / Massimo Scali | Italy | 2.0 | 1 | 1 | 1 |
| 2 | Melissa Gregory / Denis Petukhov | United States | 5.0 | 3 | 3 | 2 |
| 3 | Anastasia Belova / Ilia Isaev | Russia | 5.0 | 2 | 2 | 3 |
| 4 | Kristin Fraser / Igor Lukanin | Azerbaijan | 8.0 | 4 | 4 | 4 |
| 5 | Veronika Morávková / Jiří Procházka | Czech Republic | 10.0 | 5 | 5 | 5 |
| 6 | Tara Doherty / Tyler Myles | Canada | 12.0 | 6 | 6 | 6 |
| 7 | Sinead Kerr / John Kerr | United Kingdom | 14.0 | 7 | 7 | 7 |
| 8 | Jill Vernekohl / Dmitri Kurakin | Germany | 16.0 | 8 | 8 | 8 |
| 9 | Kimberly Navarro / Robert Shmalo | United States | 18.0 | 9 | 9 | 9 |
| 10 | Charlotte Clements / Phillip Poole | United Kingdom | 20.0 | 10 | 10 | 10 |
