= Lesley Hawker =

Canadian figure skater

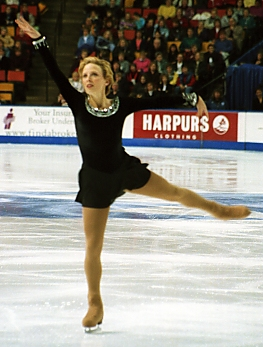
- Hawker in 2002

Personal information
- Born: May 1, 1981 (age 45) North York, Ontario, Canada
- Height: 5 ft 3 in (160 cm)

Figure skating career
- Country: Canada
- Skating club: Mariposa Winter Club; Toronto Cricket, Skating and Curling Club
- Began skating: 1987
- Retired: June 23, 2008

Lesley Hawker (born May 1, 1981) is a Canadian former competitive figure skater. She is the 2003 Winter Universiade bronze medallist, the 2003 Nebelhorn Trophy silver medallist, and a two-time Canadian national bronze medallist.

== Personal life ==
Hawker was born on May 1, 1981, in North York, Ontario. She is the eldest of ten children in her family. She worked as a waitress during her skating career.

She married Jamie Doherty in June 2006.

== Career ==
Hawker began skating in 1987. In January 2003, she won the bronze medal at the Winter Universiade in Tarvisio after placing eighth in the short program and third in the free skate. In September, she won silver at the 2003 Nebelhorn Trophy in Oberstdorf, having placed second in both segments.

Hawker finished tenth at the 2004 Skate Canada International, her first Grand Prix assignment. After placing fifth at the 2005 Canadian Championships, she was sent to the 2005 Four Continents, where she also placed fifth. She was coached by Michelle and Doug Leigh at the Mariposa Winter Club in Barrie, Ontario.

Richard Callaghan became Hawker's coach in the 2005–06 season. She won bronze at the 2006 Canadian Championships and finished fourth at the 2006 Four Continents. She was the first alternate for the 2006 Winter Olympics and 2006 World Championships. She was featured on the fifth estate, which detailed the journey of five Canadian figure skaters as they worked to qualify for the Olympic team.

The following season, Hawker repeated as the Canadian national bronze medallist and went on to place 7th at the 2007 Four Continents. In the later part of her career, she trained at the Toronto Cricket, Skating and Curling Club and Onyx Skating Academy. She announced her retirement from competitive skating on June 23, 2008.

== Programs ==
Season	Short program	Free skating
2007–08	Moon River by Liberace	I'll Be Seeing You; Hymn to the Fallen by John Williams
2006–07	Destiny by Giovanni	I'll Be Seeing You; Hymn to the Fallen by John Williams
2005–06	Smile by Charlie Chaplin	The Mission by Ennio Morricone; Gabriel's Oboe; The Mission; The Falls
2004–05	Smile by Charlie Chaplin	Madama Butterfly by Giacomo Puccini
2003–04	The Giving by Michael W. Smith	Evita by Andrew Lloyd Webber; Don't Cry for Me Argentina; You Must Love Me

== Competitive highlights ==
GP: Grand Prix

International
Event	01–02	02–03	03–04	04–05	05–06	06–07	07–08
Four Continents				5th	4th	7th	
GP Skate Canada			10th	10th	9th	9th	9th
GP NHK Trophy						8th	7th
Nebelhorn Trophy			2nd	6th	4th		
Schäfer Memorial							
Universiade		3rd					
National
Canadian Champ.	9th	9th	6th	5th	3rd	3rd	4th
