= Vitali Novikov =

Russian ice dancer

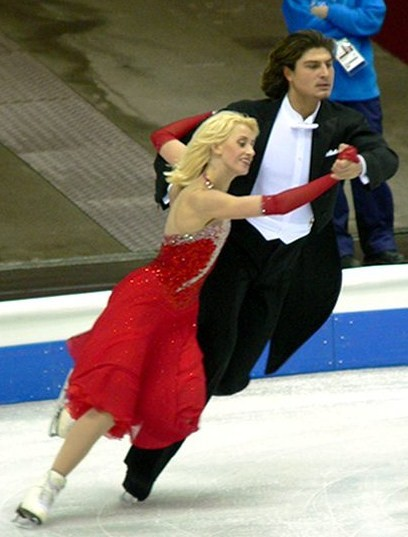
- Kulikova / Novikov at the 2005 European Championships

Personal information
- Born: 13 January 1979 (age 47) Moscow, Russian SFSR, Soviet Union
- Height: 1.84 m (6 ft 0 in)

Figure skating career
- Country: Russia
- Began skating: 1983

Vitali Novikov (born 13 January 1979) is a Russian former competitive ice dancer. With Svetlana Kulikova, he is the 2003 Nebelhorn Trophy champion.

== Career ==
Early in his career, Novikov skated with Anastasia Grebenkina, Ekaterina Gvozdikova, and Mackenzie Moliver.

Novikov teamed up with Svetlana Kulikova in January 2003. They won the first competition they entered as a team, the 2003 Nebelhorn Trophy. They won two medals at the Russian Championships and competed twice at the European and World Championships. Their best results were 7th at 2005 Europeans and 13th at 2004 Worlds. Kulikova and Novikov were coached by Tatiana Tarasova and Evgeni Platov. They parted ways after placing 14th at the 2005 World Championships.

Novikov teamed up with Olga Orlova in spring 2005. They placed 6th at the 2005 Cup of Russia and 5th at the 2006 Russian Championships.

Novikov currently works as a coach.

== Programs ==
(with Kulikova)

Season	Original dance	Free dance
2004–2005	Quickstep: Girls, Girls, Girls; Slow Foxtrot: New York, New York; Quickstep: Girls, Girls, Girls	Mon Amour by Sarah Brightman; Flamenco; Mon Amour by Sarah Brightman
2003–2004	Rock'n Roll; Blues; Rock'n Roll	Carmina Burana by Carl Orff (modern arrangement)

== Results ==
GP: Grand Prix; JGP: Junior Grand Prix

=== With Orlova ===
International
Event	2005–2006
GP Cup of Russia	6th
National
Russian Championships	5th

=== With Kulikova ===
International
Event	2003–2004	2004–2005
World Championships	13th	14th
European Championships	8th	7th
GP Cup of Russia	7th	
GP NHK Trophy		5th
GP Skate America		4th
GP Trophée Lalique	5th	
Nebelhorn Trophy	1st	
National
Russian Championships	3rd	2nd

=== With Grebenkina ===
International
Event	1999–2000	2000–2001
GP Skate America		9th
Nebelhorn Trophy		6th
Skate Israel	7th	
National
Russian Championships	5th	8th
