= 1999 Nebelhorn Trophy =

- Type: Senior International
- Date: September 1 – 4
- Season: 1999–2000
- Location: Oberstdorf
- Venue: Bundesleistungszentrum Oberstdorf

Champions
- Men's singles: (Russia) Ilia Klimkin
- Ladies' singles: (Ukraine) Elena Liashenko
- Pairs: (Ukraine) Aliona Savchenko / Stanislav Morozov
- Ice dance: (United States) Jamie Silverstein / Justin Pekarek
- Previous: 1998 Nebelhorn Trophy
- Next: 2000 Nebelhorn Trophy

The 1999 Nebelhorn Trophy took place between September 1 and 4, 1999 at the Bundesleistungszentrum Oberstdorf. It is an international senior-level figure skating competition organized by the Deutsche Eislauf-Union and held annually in Oberstdorf, Germany. The competition is named after the Nebelhorn, a nearby mountain.

Skaters were entered by their respective national federations, rather than receiving individual invitations as in the Grand Prix of Figure Skating, and competed in four disciplines: men's singles, ladies' singles, pair skating, and ice dance. The Fritz-Geiger-Memorial Trophy was presented to the country with the highest placements across all disciplines.

In the men's free skating, Klimkin became the first skater to land two different quadruple jumps in one program (quad salchow and quad toe loop).

== Results ==
=== Men ===
Rank	Name	Nation	TFP	SP	FS
1	Ilia Klimkin	Russia	2.5	3	1
2	Vitali Danilchenko	Ukraine	2.5	1	2
3	Jayson Dénommée	Canada	7.0	8	3
4	Damon Allen	United States	7.0	6	4
5	Michael Tyllesen	Denmark	7.5	5	5
6	Robert Grzegorczyk	Poland	8.0	4	6
7	Stanick Jeannette	France	9.0	2	8
8	Margus Hernits	Estonia	13.0	12	7
9	Neil Wilson	United Kingdom	14.5	11	9
10	Shepherd Clark	United States	16.5	9	12
11	Gabriel Monnier	France	18.0	10	13
12	Johnny Ronne Jensen	Denmark	18.5	17	10
13	Sascha Lorenz	Germany	20.0	18	11
14	Radek Horák	Czech Republic	21.5	15	14
15	Fedor Andreev	Canada	21.5	13	15
16	André Kaden	Germany	25.0	14	18
17	Róbert Kažimír	Slovakia	26.5	21	16
18	Bartosz Domański	Poland	26.5	19	17
19	Andrej Primak	Germany	27.0	16	19
20	Michael Ganser	Germany	31.0	22	20
21	Ronny Ahlswede	Germany	32.5	23	21
22	David Del Pozo	Mexico	34.0	24	22
WD	Gheorghe Chiper	Romania		7	
WD	Sebastian Prahl	Germany		20	

=== Ladies ===
Rank	Name	Nation	TFP	SP	FS
1	Elena Liashenko	Ukraine	1.5	1	1
2	Sanna-Maija Wikstein	Finland	4.0	4	2
3	Elina Kettunen	Finland	4.0	2	3
4	Amber Corwin	United States	7.5	3	6
5	Anna Neshcheret	Ukraine	8.0	8	4
6	Andrea Aggeler	United States	9.5	9	5
7	Eva-Maria Fitze	Germany	9.5	5	7
8	Daria Timoshenko	Russia	13.5	7	10
9	Zuzana Paurova	Slovakia	14.0	12	8
10	Susanne Stadlmüller	Germany	14.0	6	11
11	Anna Lundström	Sweden	15.5	13	9
12	Shirene Human	South Africa	18.5	11	13
13	Sara Waldmann	Germany	20.0	16	12
14	Olga Vassilieva	Estonia	21.0	14	14
15	Sabina Wojtala	Poland	22.0	10	17
16	Nina Sackerer	Germany	24.5	19	15
17	Anette Dytrtová	Czech Republic	25.0	18	16
18	Roxana Luca	Romania	26.5	17	18
19	Julia Cortial	France	27.5	15	20
20	Marion Krijgsman	Netherlands	29.5	21	19
21	Kaja Hanevold	Norway	31.0	20	21
22	Jessica Board	Germany	33.0	22	22
23	Melanie Leblanc	Canada	34.5	22	23
WD	Dorothee Deroittee	Belgium		24	
WD	Svetlana Bukareva	Russia			

=== Pairs ===
Rank	Name	Nation	TFP	SP	FS
1	Aliona Savchenko / Stanislav Morozov	Ukraine	2.5	3	1
2	Jacinthe Larivière / Lenny Faustino	Canada	2.5	1	2
3	Julia Obertas / Dmitri Palamarchuk	Ukraine	4.0	2	3
4	Tiffany Scott / Philip Dulebohn	United States	7.5	7	4
5	Michelle Bylow / Michael Pollard	Canada	9.0	8	5
6	Viktoria Shklover / Valdis Mintals	Estonia	9.0	6	6
7	Mariana Kautz / Norman Jeschke	Germany	9.5	5	7
8	Katharina Rybowski / Rico Rex	Germany	11.0	4	9
9	Oľga Beständigová / Jozef Beständig	Slovakia	13.5	11	8
10	Nathalie Vlandis / James Peterson	United States	15.0	10	10
11	Tatjana Zaharjeva / Juris Salmanov	Latvia	15.5	9	11

=== Ice dance ===
Rank	Name	Nation	TFP	CD1	CD2	OD	FD
1	Jamie Silverstein / Justin Pekarek	United States	2.0	1	1	1	1
2	Alia Ouabdelsselam / Benjamin Delmas	France	4.0	2	2	2	2
3	Stephanie Rauer / Thomas Rauer	Germany	6.2	3	4	3	3
4	Aleksandra Kauc / Filip Bernadowski	Poland	7.8	4	3	4	4
5	Rebecca Babb / Josh Babb	Canada	10.6	6	7	5	5
6	Jenny Dahlen / Igor Lukanin	Azerbaijan	12.2	5	5	7	6
7	Pamela O'Connor / Jonathon O'Dougherty	United Kingdom	13.4	8	6	6	7
8	Christine Fuller / Mark Bradshaw	Canada	16.0	7	9	8	8
9	Elisa Angeli / Moreno La Fiosca	Italy	18.8	9	10	10	9
10	Tatiana Kurkudym / Yuri Kocherzhenko	Ukraine	19.0	10	8	9	10
11	Zuzana Durkovska / Marian Mesaros	Slovakia	22.0	11	11	11	11
