= Benjamin Miller (figure skater) =

American figure skater

Personal information
- Full name: Benjamin Edward Miller
- Born: June 17, 1983 (age 43) Saint Paul, Minnesota, United States

Figure skating career
- Country: United States
- Began skating: 1988
- Retired: 2004

Benjamin Edward Miller (born June 17, 1983) is an American former competitive figure skater who competed in men's singles. He is the 2002 Nebelhorn Trophy silver medalist, 2002 Golden Spin of Zagreb bronze medalist, and 1999 JGP Slovenia silver medalist. He competed at the 2001 World Junior Championships, placing 15th, and appeared once on the senior Grand Prix series, placing tenth at the 2002 NHK Trophy.

In January 2005, Miller said he was looking for an ice dancing partner following an injury that ended his singles career.

Miller attended St. Paul Central High School and the University of Minnesota. He married Sean Peter Reisman on March 16, 2012.

== Programs ==
Season	Short program	Free skating
2002–03	Tango	Cirque du Soleil by Benoît Jutras; Quidam; Innocence; Eclipse
2000–01	Firebird by Igor Stravinsky	Latin medley

== Results ==
GP: Grand Prix; JGP: Junior Grand Prix

International
Event	97–98	98–99	99–00	00–01	01–02	02–03	03–04
GP NHK Trophy						10th	
Golden Spin						3rd	
Nebelhorn Trophy						2nd	
International: Junior
Junior Worlds				15th			
JGP Poland				6th			
JGP Slovenia			2nd				
JGP Ukraine				6th			
Triglav Trophy					3rd J		
National
U.S. Champ.	9th N	4th N	3rd J	2nd J	3rd J	13th	19th
Levels: N = Novice; J = Junior
