= Larisa Spielberg =

American figure skater

Personal information
- Born: December 22, 1980 (age 45) Lansing, Michigan

Figure skating career
- Country: United States
- Partner: Craig Joeright
- Coach: Sergey Petrovskiy; Richard Callaghan; Veronica Voyk; Johnny Johns; Mitch Moyer; Jason Dungjen
- Skating club: Onyx Skating Academy
- Began skating: 1990
- Retired: 2004

Larisa B. Spielberg Joeright (born December 22, 1980) is an American former competitive pair skater. With her husband, Craig Joeright, she is the 2002 Golden Spin of Zagreb champion and 2000 U.S. national bronze medalist.

== Personal life ==
Spielberg was born on December 22, 1980, in Lansing, Michigan. She graduated from East Lansing High School in 1999 and later studied health sciences, with an emphasis on physical therapy, at Oakland University in Rochester, Michigan. She graduated from Wayne State University School Of Medicine in 2005.

Spielberg and Joeright announced their engagement in August 2003. Their twin daughters were born in 2012.

== Career ==
Spielberg began learning to skate in 1990. A pairs coach, Johnny Johns, introduced her to Craig Joeright. Spielberg/Joeright teamed up in September 1996 at the Detroit Skating Club. Early in their partnership, they were coached by Johns, Mitch Moyer, and Jason Dungjen in Bloomfield Hills, Michigan.

Competing in the 1998–99 ISU Junior Grand Prix series, the pair won bronze in Mexico City, Mexico, and placed fifth in Budapest, Hungary.

During the 1999–2000 ISU Junior Grand Prix series, Spielberg/Joeright won silver in Ostrava, Czech Republic, and then took bronze in Nagano, Japan. They finished as third alternates for a spot at the JGP Final. In February, they competed in the senior ranks at the 2000 U.S. Championships and received the bronze medal. In March, they placed 13th at the 2000 World Junior Championships in Oberstdorf, Germany.

In 2001, Spielberg injured her left wrist and foot, causing the pair to withdraw from the Grand Prix series. Sergey Petrovskiy, Richard Callaghan, and Veronica Voyk became their coaches after Spielberg/Joeright relocated to the Onyx Skating Academy in Rochester, Michigan, in 2001.

Making their senior international debut, the pair placed fifth at the 2002 Nebelhorn Trophy and then won gold at the 2002 Golden Spin of Zagreb. They took the pewter medal at the 2003 U.S. Championships.

In their final season, Spielberg/Joeright competed at two senior Grand Prix events; they placed seventh at the 2003 Skate America and tenth at the 2003 Skate Canada International. They retired from competitive skating after placing sixth at the 2004 U.S. Championships.

== Programs ==
(with Craig Joeright)

Season	Short program	Free skating
2003–2004	Tango (from Indochine) choreo. by Olga Volozhinskaya	Escape (from Plunkett & Macleane); Balcony Scene (from Romeo + Juliet) performed by Craig Armstrong choreo. by Olga Volozhinskaya

== Competitive highlights ==
GP: Grand Prix; JGP: Junior Grand Prix

with Joeright

International
Event	97–98	98–99	99–00	00–01	01–02	02–03	03–04
GP Skate America							7th
GP Skate Canada							10th
Golden Spin						1st	
Nebelhorn						5th	4th
International: Junior
Junior Worlds			13th				
JGP Czech Rep.			2nd				
JGP Hungary		5th					
JGP Japan			3rd				
JGP Mexico		3rd					
National
U.S. Champ.	3rd J	8th	3rd	9th	7th	4th	6th
