= ISU Judging System =

Ice skating scoring system

The ISU Judging System is the scoring system that has been used since 2004 to judge the figure skating disciplines of men's and ladies' singles, pair skating, ice dance, and synchronized skating. It was designed and implemented by the International Skating Union (ISU), the governing body of the sport.

This system of scoring is used in all international competitions sanctioned by the ISU, including the Olympic Games. The ISU Judging System replaced the previous 6.0 system. It was created, in part, in response to the 2002 Winter Olympics figure skating scandal. The IJS produces more detailed statistics and feedback to skaters and their coaches, better consistency among judges, and measures precise differences between skaters in competition.

Competitors accumulate points based on the base value (BV) of each technical element, and on its element's grade of execution (GOE). They are judged in two areas: the total segment score in both the short program and the free skating program, and program component scores, which are based on their overall skating skills and performance level. The IJS is constructed into four parts: competition officials, which comprise the technical panel and the judges; the technical score (TES); the presentation score; and the final score.

== History ==
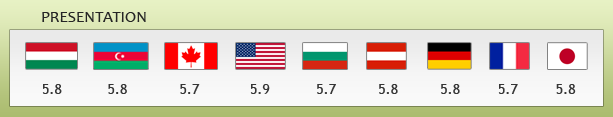
An example scoreboard using the 6.0 system

Following the 2002 Winter Olympics and the 2002 Winter Olympics figure skating scandal, the 6.0 system of judging figure skating was retired by the International Skating Union (ISU), the governing body that oversees figure skating, and the ISU Judging System (IJS) was put in place. The 6.0 system was developed in the early days of the sport, when skaters traced figures on the ice, which, as writer Ellyn Kestnbaum states, "gave rise to the system of awarding marks based on a standard of 6.0 as perfection". It was a placement-judging system in which scores were issued based on how each skater compared to others in the same competition, not on any absolute scale. Figure skating historian James R. Hines calls the 6.0 system "age-old" and "unique to figure skating and deeply entrenched". He says that it was a tradition understood and appreciated by skaters, judges, officials, and fans and that fans found it easy to relate to the 6.0 system, which "represented skating perfection and served as every skater's goal".

The IJS was implemented in 2004, following two seasons of testing. The first time the IJS was used at an international competition was at the 2003 Skate America in October 2003; it had also been used at the 2003 Nebelhorn Trophy a month earlier. The first time the IJS was used at the Olympics was in 2006, in Turin.

== Description ==
In late 2003, the ISU released an explanation of four advantages of the IJS over the 6.0 system. Under the IJS, judges enter a point score for each technical element, and at the end of the program, scores for each program component. The ISU states that the statistics generated will make scoring easier for skaters and fans to understand and produce "a detailed record and transparent measure of performance quality". The IJS provides more feedback, which helps skaters and their coaches identify strengths, weaknesses, and areas for improvement. It provides better consistency among judges because they are guided by the same criteria, and allows them to judge each skater's performance separately. Finally, the IJS measures the precise differences between each skater's performances.

In 2022, Tatiana Yordanova of the National Sports Academy analyzed judges' scores and the dependencies between the final results and the separate parts of their evaluations after the IJS' introduction in 2004. She also studied the judging protocols for the short and free skating programs used during the Winter Olympics between 2006 and 2022 and found that judges' evaluations of the short program and the free skating program during the Olympics became more precise because each element was evaluated separately. The information the judges provided during their scoring gave skaters' coaches "a clear idea of the mistakes made and what exactly needs to be worked on to get better results". According to Yordanova, judging in figure skating became more objective after the implementation of the IJS, especially after the GOEs were increased in 2018.

Competitors accumulate points based on the degree of difficulty (base value, or BV) of each technical element, which depends on the type of element and its complexity, and how well skaters execute each element (grade of execution, or GOE). They also earn points through their program component scores, which are based on their overall skating skills and performance level. Each element is evaluated separately. (Note: See Yordanova, p. 65, for an example of a judges' protocol sheet for a women's free skating program.)

The total segment score for each competitor in each segment of the competition (short program/rhythm dance, free skating program/free dance) is calculated by adding the total technical score and presentation scores, after any deductions (e.g., -1.0 point for each fall) are subtracted. The total segment scores of both programs are added together, and the resulting score is the competition's final score; the competitor(s) with the highest total score win the competition. The ISU must publish, after each segment of the competition, a list with "all relevant scoring data for skaters", which includes the BVs of all the elements and the GOEs and points for the program components from each judge. The final results must include, for each skater and team, the final placements and, separately, the placing of each competition segment.

Judges give deductions for the following:

- Program time violations for going over or under the allotted time.
- Illegal elements and/or movements.
- Wardrobe malfunctions; i.e., parts of the skaters' costumes or decorations falling on the ice.
- Falls.
- Interruptions.
- Choreography restrictions.
- Tempo specifications in ice dance.
- Ice dance lifts exceeding the permitted duration as prescribed.

The IJS is constructed into four parts: Competition officials, which comprise the technical panel and the judges; the technical score (TES); the presentation score; and the final score.

=== Competition officials ===
==== Technical panel ====
The technical panel is made up of the technical controller and two technical specialists, each from a different ISU member country. Decisions are made by a majority vote among the members of the technical panel. The technical specialists "identify and call the performed elements and the specific Levels of Difficulty of certain performed elements (e.g. spins, footwork)". They also identify illegal or additional elements, falls, downgraded and underrotated jumps, and jumps executed from the wrong edge. The technical controller authorizes and/or corrects all calls, proposes corrections if necessary, and supervises the data operator. If there is disagreement among the technical panel, the majority opinion prevails. Technical specialist 1 identifies each element, and technical specialist 2 and the technical controller support the primary specialist to ensure that all elements are correctly identified.

A data operator assists the technical panel with recording purposes. The relay operator supports the technical panel by operating the instantaneous slow-motion video replay system, which helps the technical panel verify the elements performed. The specialists and the controller are recorded on audio tape, which, along with the video replay, is reviewed after each performance, if necessary, and the scores are changed accordingly. When the scores are posted and announced to the public, they are final.

==== Judging panel ====
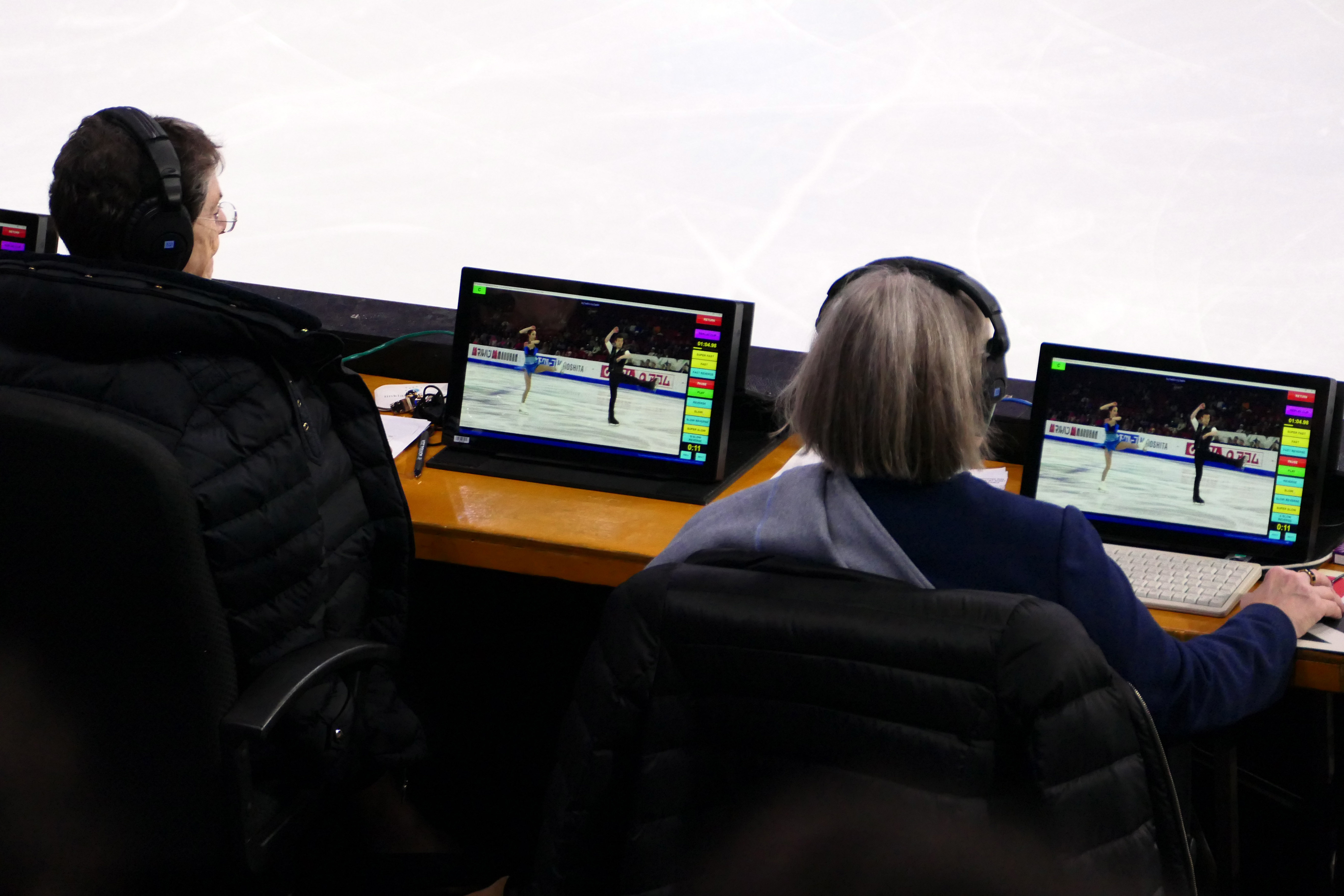
Figure skating judges, 2024 World Championships

For major competitions, there are usually nine members of the judging panel per segment, though there can be fewer, but not fewer than three judges. They "entirely focus on evaluating the quality of each element performed (Technical score) and the quality of the performance (Presentation Score)". The scores are based on the specific quality criteria of each technical element and the five program component scores for each skater, and provide a "comprehensive assessment of each skater's skill and performance", but are not a comparison of each skater's skills and performance to other skaters in the competition.

Judges enter scores through a touchscreen unit; at ISU competitions, judges review, in real time, certain elements of the skaters' performances through the instantaneous video replay system. A computer records results, keeps track of comparative scores, and determines placements by calculating each skater's scores. When an element is identified, its name appears immediately on the judge's screen.

=== Total Elements Score (TES) ===
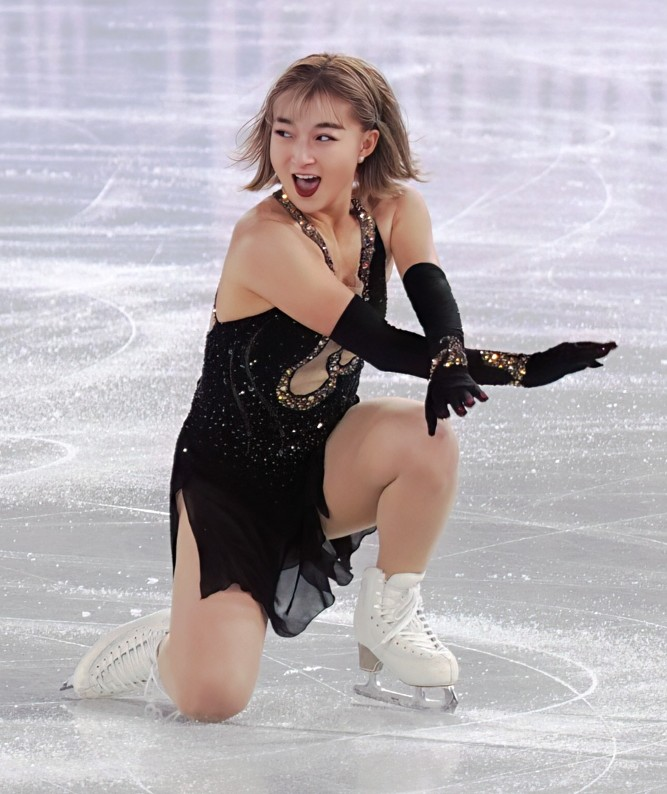
Kaori Sakamoto performing her free skate at 2024–25 Grand Prix Final

For the Total Elements Score (TES, also called the Technical Score), each judge grades its quality by assigning it a Grade of Execution (GOE) on a scale of +5 to −5. (Note: Starting from the 2018–19 season, the GOEs were changed from −3 to +3 to −5 to +5.) Each figure skating element has a base value; the judges assign a GOE to each element that increases its value when executed well or decreases its value when done poorly. (Note: See "Communication No. 2707: Single & Pair Skating" for the list of the scale of values for single and pair skating, valid as of 2025.) As the ISU puts it, "Each plus or minus step in the GOE results in increasing or decreasing the value by 10% in single and pair skating and by 16% in ice dancing".

The ISU publishes, in a yearly communication, a Scale of Value (SOV) chart of each element's base value (BV), which depends on the element's difficulty and its level of difficulty for spins, steps, lifts, and other elements. Some elements, such as spins and footwork sequences, are further broken down by their level of difficulty. The base values and levels of difficulty make sure that competitors earn the appropriate and consistent credit for every element they perform.

The judges use the trimmed mean when calculating their scores, in which the highest and lowest scores of each element are removed, and the remaining scores are averaged to determine the final GOE for each element. Then the GOE is added or subtracted from the base value for each element, and it is rounded to two decimal places. The total of all the elements' scores yields the TES.

Jump combinations and jump sequences in single skating and pair skating are evaluated as one unit. The base values of the jumps included are added together, then the GOE is applied "with the numerical value of the most difficult jump". For example, during her free skate at the 2025 Grand Prix Final, Kaori Sakamoto of Japan executed a triple Lutz-double toe loop combination jump, with a BV of 7.20 points. Her GOE was 1.60 points. The total points she earned with this combination jump were 8.80 points. (Note: Sakamoto's GOE was based upon her triple Lutz jump, which BV is 5.90 points; the BV of the double toe loop jump is worth 1.30 points.)

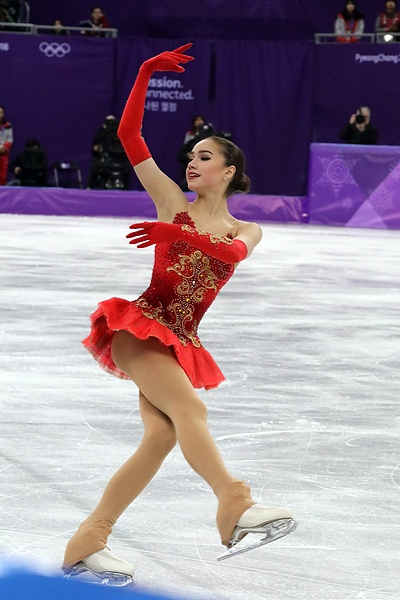
Alina Zagitova performing her free skate at the 2018 Winter Olympics

If a skater executes any element or elements that exceed the prescribed number of elements in a program, the extra elements are not counted in the final score. Only the first element attempted will count. In single skating, the BVs for jump elements executed during the second part of a skater's short program and free skating program are "multiplied by a special factor 1.1 in order to give credit for even distribution of difficulties in the program". The 1.1 special factor, however, is applied only for the last one-jump element executed in the second half of the short program, and for the last three jump elements executed during the second half of the free skate. This limit has been called "the Zagitova rule", named for Alina Zagitova from Russia, who won the gold medal at the 2018 Winter Olympics by "backloading" her free skating program, or placing all her jumps in the second half of the program.

In ice dance, combination lifts are evaluated as one unit; the BVs of the first two short lifts executed are added together, and then the GOE is applied. The GOE of the combination lift is "equal to the sum of the numerical values of the corresponding GOE" of these first two short lifts. Step sequences are evaluated as one unit by adding the BVs of the step sequences of both skaters and then applying the GOE. The ISU states that the "GOE is equal to the sum of the numerical values of the corresponding GOEs of the Step Sequences". Turn sequences are also evaluated as one unit by summing the BVs executed by both skaters and then applying the GOE. The ISU states that the "GOE is equal to the sum of the numerical values of the corresponding GOEs" of the executed turns.

=== Program Component Score (PCS) ===
For the Program Component Score (also called the Presentation Score), judges award points on a scale of 0.25 to 10.00, with increments of 0.25, for the presentation score, which grades the overall presentation of skaters' performances. There are three program components: composition, presentation, and skating skills. Pair skaters and ice dancers must demonstrate an equal demonstration of the criteria. Each program component score is obtained by calculating the trimmed mean of the judges' results for that component, in the same way as the TES. The trimmed mean of each program component is also rounded to two decimal places.

The points for each Program Component Score are multiplied by a factor "such that the Program Component Score is as equivalent as possible to the Total Elements Score" as follows:

Discipline	Short program (factor)	Free skating (factor)
Men	1.67	3.33
Women	1.33	2.67
Pairs	1.33	2.67
Ice dance	Rhythm dance: 1.33	Free dance: 2.00

The ISU defines the program components in the following way:

- Composition refers to how the program is designed in relation to the music, taking into consideration five criteria: unity; connection between and within the elements; pattern and ice coverage; multidimensional movement and use of space; and choreography reflecting musical phrase and form.
- Presentation evaluates how the program is performed in relation to the music, focusing on: expressiveness and projection; contrast and variety of movements and energy; musical sensitivity and timing; and oneness and awareness of space (for pair skating and ice dance).
- Skating Skills is defined as "a skater’s ability to execute a repertoire of steps, turns and skating movements with blade and body control", taking the following into consideration: variety and clarity of edges, steps, movements, turns and directions; body control; balance and glide; flow; power and speed; and unison (for pair skating and ice dance).

== Works cited ==
- "Figure Skating Media Guide 2025/26" (PDF). International Skating Union. 21 August 2025. Archived (PDF) from the original on 14 September 2025.
- "Frequently Asked Questions (FAQ) on the ISU New Judging System". International Skating Union. 8 September 2003. Archived from the original on 27 July 2021.
- Hines, James R. (2011). Historical Dictionary of Figure Skating. Lanham, Maryland: Scarecrow Press. ISBN 978-0-8108-6859-5.
- Kestnbaum, Ellyn (2003). Culture on Ice: Figure Skating and Cultural Meaning. Middletown, Connecticut: Wesleyan University Press. ISBN 0819566411.
- "Special Regulations & Technical Rules – Single & Pair Skating and Ice Dance 2024" (PDF). International Skating Union. Archived (PDF) from the original on 9 November 2024.
- Yordanova, Tatiana (December 2022). "Judging Results in Figure Skating after the ISU Judging System Was Introduced in 2004". Journal of Applied Sports Sciences. 6 (2): 64–76. doi:10.37393/JASS.2022.02.6.
