= Jayson Dénommée =

Canadian figure skater (born 1977)

Personal information
- Born: March 31, 1977 (age 49) Sherbrooke, Quebec
- Height: 1.73 m (5 ft 8 in)

Figure skating career
- Country: Canada
- Skating club: CPA Sherbrooke
- Began skating: 1984
- Retired: 2004

Jayson Dénommée (born March 31, 1977, in Sherbrooke, Quebec) is a Canadian former competitive figure skater. He is the 1998 Ondrej Nepela Memorial silver medalist, 1999 Nebelhorn Trophy bronze medalist, and 2001 Canadian national silver medalist. He placed 11th at the 2001 and Four Continents Championships.

== Programs ==
Season	Short program	Free skating
2002–03	Gillies: The Sleeping Tuna by Wolfstone	Santa Monica by the Ballroom Dance Orchestra; Cool by Rochester Pops Orchestra; West Side Story by Leonard Bernstein
2001–02	Sabrosa (from The In Sound from Way Out!) by the Beastie Boys	70's medley - Cream Street by Dick Dagger
2000–01	Sabrosa (from The In Sound from Way Out!) by the Beastie Boys	Night Train by King Curtis; Harlem Nocturne by Earle Hagen; Hot Saxes

== Results ==
GP: Champions Series / Grand Prix

=== Senior career ===
International
Event	96–97	97–98	98–99	99–00	00–01	01–02	02–03	03–04
Four Continents					11th	11th		
GP Cup of Russia							9th	
GP Nations Cup	6th							
GP NHK Trophy		5th		11th				
GP Skate America		8th						
GP Skate Canada	11th		7th				9th	
Nebelhorn Trophy				3rd				
Nepela Memorial			2nd					
Schäfer Memorial		5th						
International
Canadian Champ.	9th	5th	4th	WD	2nd	4th	8th	7th

=== Junior and novice career ===
National
Event	92–93	93–94	94–95	95–96
Canadian Championships	6th N	1st N	9th J	2nd J
Levels: N = Novice; J = Junior
