= 2001 Nebelhorn Trophy =

- Type: Senior International
- Date: September 4 – 7
- Season: 2001–02
- Location: Oberstdorf
- Venue: Bundesleistungszentrum Oberstdorf

Champions
- Men's singles: (Belarus) Sergei Davydov
- Ladies' singles: (Russia) Ludmila Nelidina
- Pairs: (Canada) Jacinthe Larivière / Lenny Faustino
- Ice dance: (Poland) Sylwia Nowak / Sebastian Kolasiński
- Previous: 2000 Nebelhorn Trophy
- Next: 2002 Nebelhorn Trophy

The 2001 Nebelhorn Trophy took place between September 4 and 7, 2001 at the Bundesleistungszentrum Oberstdorf. It is an international senior-level figure skating competition organized by the Deutsche Eislauf-Union and held annually in Oberstdorf, Germany. The competition is named after the Nebelhorn, a nearby mountain.

It was one of the first international senior competitions of the season. Skaters were entered by their respective national federations, rather than receiving individual invitations as in the Grand Prix of Figure Skating, and competed in four disciplines: men's singles, ladies singles, pair skating, and ice dance. The Fritz-Geiger-Memorial Trophy was presented to the country with the highest placements across all disciplines.

== Results ==
=== Men ===
Rank	Name	Nation	TFP	SP	FS
1	Sergei Davydov	Belarus	1.5	1	1
2	Jeffrey Buttle	Canada	3.5	3	2
3	Margus Hernits	Estonia	4.0	2	3
4	Alexei Vasilevsky	Russia	7.0	6	4
5	Derrick Delmore	United States	7.5	5	5
6	Matthew Davies	United Kingdom	9.0	4	7
7	Silvio Smalun	Germany	10.0	8	6
8	Vakhtang Murvanidze	Georgia	12.5	9	8
9	Ryan Jahnke	United States	12.5	7	9
10	Lukáš Rakowski	Czech Republic	15.0	10	10
11	Alexei Kozlov	Estonia	16.5	11	11
12	Sean Wirtz	Canada	18.0	12	12
13	Gregor Urbas	Slovenia	20.0	14	13
14	Angelo Dolfini	Italy	21.5	15	14
15	Tomáš Verner	Czech Republic	23.5	13	17
16	Ulf Wilhelm Bökeler	Germany	24.5	19	15
17	Bartosz Domański	Poland	26.0	20	16
18	Lee Kyu-hyun	South Korea	26.0	16	18
19	Andrej Primak	Germany	28.0	18	19
20	Michael Ganser	Germany	28.5	17	20
21	Mauricio Medellin	Mexico	31.5	21	21

=== Ladies ===
Rank	Name	Nation	TFP	SP	FS
1	Ludmila Nelidina	Russia	2.5	3	1
2	Ann Patrice McDonough	United States	2.5	1	2
3	Kristina Oblasova	Russia	4.0	2	3
4	Susanne Stadlmüller	Germany	6.0	4	4
5	Galina Maniachenko	Ukraine	8.5	5	6
6	Mikkeline Kierkgaard	Denmark	9.5	9	5
7	Alisa Drei	Finland	11.0	6	8
8	Sara Wheat	United States	13.0	12	7
9	Michelle Currie	Canada	14.0	10	9
10	Julia Soldatova	Belarus	15.5	11	10
11	Nicole Watt	Canada	18.5	15	11
12	Sabina Wojtala	Poland	18.5	7	15
13	Lucie Krausová	Czech Republic	19.5	13	13
14	Zuzana Babiaková	Slovakia	20.0	16	12
15	Susanna Pöykiö	Finland	20.0	8	16
16	Sarah Waldmann	Germany	21.0	14	14
17	Lenka Seniglova	Czech Republic	26.0	18	17
18	Martine Adank	Switzerland	27.5	19	18
19	Shirene Human	South Africa	27.5	17	19
20	Cornelia Rast	Switzerland	31.5	23	20
21	Kaja Hanevold	Norway	31.5	21	21
22	Olga Vassiljeva	Estonia	34.0	24	22
23	Jekaterina Golovatenko	Estonia	34.0	22	23
24	Silvia Koncokova	Slovakia	34.0	20	24
25	Alenka Zidar	Slovenia	38.0	26	25
26	Melania Albea	Spain	38.5	25	26
27	Ksenia Jastsenjski	(Serbia and Montenegro) FR Yugoslavia	40.5	27	27
28	Ingrid Roth	Mexico	42.0	28	28

=== Pairs ===
Rank	Name	Nation	TFP	SP	FS
1	Jacinthe Larivière / Lenny Faustino	Canada	1.5	1	1
2	Valerie Saurette / Jean-Sébastien Fecteau	Canada	3.0	2	2
3	Laura Handy / Jonathon Hunt	United States	4.5	3	3
4	Molly Quigley / Bert Cording	United States	7.5	7	4
5	Tatiana Chuvaeva / Dmitri Palamarchuk	Ukraine	7.5	5	5
6	Viktoria Shklover / Valdis Mintals	Estonia	8.0	4	6
7	Victoria Maxiuta / Vitaly Dubina	Ukraine	10.0	6	7
8	Jelena Sirokhvatova / Jurijs Salmanovs	Latvia	12.0	8	8

=== Ice dance ===
Rank	Name	Nation	TFP	CD	OD	FD
1	Sylwia Nowak / Sebastian Kolasiński	Poland	2.0	1	1	1
2	Federica Faiella / Massimo Scali	Italy	4.0	2	2	2
3	Anastasia Belova / Illia Isaev	Russia	6.0	3	3	3
4	Kristin Fraser / Igor Lukanin	Azerbaijan	8.0	4	4	4
5	Alla Beknazarova / Yuri Kocherzhenko	Ukraine	10.0	5	5	5
6	Jill Vernekohl / Dmitri Kurakin	Germany	13.0	6	6	7
7	Ekaterina Gvozdkova / Timur Alaskhanov	Russia	14.8	10	8	6
8	Veronika Morávková / Jiří Procházka	Czech Republic	15.0	7	7	8
9	Tara Doherty / Tyler Myles	Canada	18.6	9	10	9
10	Charlotte Clements / Phillip Poole	United Kingdom	18.6	8	9	10
11	Sheri Moir / Danny Moir	Canada	22.4	12	11	11
12	Phillipa Towler-Green / Robert Burgerman	United Kingdom	23.6	11	12	12
13	Agnieszka Dulej / Sławomir Janicki	Poland	27.0	14	14	13
14	Anna Mosenkova / Sergei Sychov	Estonia	27.0	13	13	14
WD	Alissa De Carbonnel / Alexander Malkov	Belarus				
