= ISU Junior Grand Prix in Sweden =

International figure skating competition

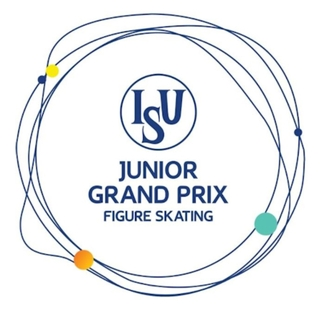
- Genre: ISU Junior Grand Prix
- Location: Sweden
- Most recent: 2003

The ISU Junior Grand Prix in Sweden (originally called the Salchow Trophy) is an international figure skating competition sanctioned by the International Skating Union (ISU), organized and hosted by the Swedish Figure Skating Federation (Swedish: Svenska Konståkningsförbundet). It is held periodically as an event of the ISU Junior Grand Prix of Figure Skating (JGP), a series of international competitions exclusively for junior-level skaters. Medals may be awarded in men's singles, women's singles, pair skating, and ice dance. Skaters earn points based on their results at the qualifying competitions each season, and the top skaters or teams in each discipline are invited to then compete at the Junior Grand Prix of Figure Skating Final.

== History ==
The ISU Junior Grand Prix of Figure Skating (JGP) was established by the International Skating Union (ISU) in 1997 and consists of a series of seven international figure skating competitions exclusively for junior-level skaters. The locations of the Junior Grand Prix events change every year. While all seven competitions feature the men's, women's, and ice dance events, only four competitions each season feature the pairs event. Skaters earn points based on their results each season, and the top skaters or teams in each discipline are then invited to compete at the Junior Grand Prix of Figure Skating Final.

Skaters are eligible to compete on the junior-level circuit if they are at least 13 years old before 1 July of the respective season, but not yet 19 (for single skaters), 21 (for men and women in ice dance and women in pair skating), or 23 (for men in pair skating). Competitors are chosen by their respective skating federations. The number of entries allotted to each ISU member nation in each discipline is determined by their results at the prior World Junior Figure Skating Championships.

== Results ==
=== Men's singles ===
| Year | Location | Gold | Silver | Bronze | Ref. |
|---|---|---|---|---|---|
| 1999 | Stockholm | (United States) Evan Lysacek | (France) Cyril Brun | (United States) Ryan Bradley | |
| 2001 | Malmö | (Russia) Andrei Griazev | (China) Ma Xiaodong | (Finland) Ari-Pekka Nurmenkari | |
| 2003 Final | Malmö | (United States) Evan Lysacek | (Russia) Andrei Griazev | (Canada) Christopher Mabee | |

=== Women's singles ===
| Year | Location | Gold | Silver | Bronze | Ref. |
|---|---|---|---|---|---|
| 1999 | Stockholm | (United States) Sasha Cohen | (Sweden) Anna Lundström | (Denmark) Mikkeline Kierkgaard | |
| 2001 | Malmö | (Japan) Miki Ando | (Russia) Tatiana Basova | (Russia) Irina Tkatchuk | |
| 2003 Final | Malmö | (Japan) Miki Ando | (Sweden) Lina Johansson | (Hungary) Viktória Pavuk | |

=== Pairs ===
| Year | Location | Gold | Silver | Bronze | Ref. |
|---|---|---|---|---|---|
| 1999 | Stockholm | (Estonia); Viktoria Shklover; Valdis Mintals | (United States); Abbi Gleeson; Jonathon Hunt | (United States); Jessica Waldstein; Garrett Lucash | |
| 2001 | Malmö | (China); Zhang Dan; Zhang Hao | (China); Ding Yang; Ren Zhongfei | (Russia); Maria Mukhortova; Pavel Lebedev | |
| 2003 Final | Malmö | (Canada); Jessica Dubé; Bryce Davison | (Russia); Natalia Shestakova; Pavel Lebedev | (Russia); Maria Mukhortova; Maxim Trankov | |

=== Ice dance ===
| Year | Location | Gold | Silver | Bronze | Ref. |
|---|---|---|---|---|---|
| 1999 | Stockholm | (Russia); Natalia Romaniuta; Daniil Barantsev | (Ukraine); Kristina Kobaladze; Oleg Voiko | (France); Nelly Gouverst; Cédric Pernet | |
| 2001 | Malmö | (Russia); Elena Romanovskaya; Alexander Grachev | (Ukraine); Anna Zadorozhniuk; Sergei Verbillo | (France); Myriam Trividic; Yann Abback | |
| 2003 Final | Malmö | (Hungary); Nóra Hoffmann; Attila Elek | (Russia); Elena Romanovskaya; Alexander Grachev | (United States); Morgan Matthews; Maxim Zavozin | |
