= 2004 World Junior Figure Skating Championships =

- Type: ISU Championship
- Date: February 29 – March 7
- Season: 2003–04
- Location: The Hague, Netherlands
- Venue: De Uithof

Champions
- Men's singles: (Russia) Andrei Griazev
- Ladies' singles: (Japan) Miki Ando
- Pairs: (Russia) Natalia Shestakova / Pavel Lebedev
- Ice dance: (Russia) Elena Romanovskaya / Alexander Grachev
- Previous: 2003 World Junior Championships
- Next: 2005 World Junior Championships

The 2004 World Junior Figure Skating Championships were held at the De Uithof in The Hague, Netherlands between February 29 and March 7. Junior age eligible figure skaters competed for the title of World Junior Champion in men's singles, ladies' singles, pair skating, and ice dancing.

Due to the large number of participants, the men's and ladies' qualifying groups were split into groups A and B. The ice dancing qualifying event was split into two groups as well, with both groups doing the same dances in the same order. Group B skated their first and second dances one after the other, then Group A skated their first and second, in the same order. The first compulsory dance was the Quickstep and the second was the Paso Doble.

== Medals table ==
Rank	Nation	Gold	Silver	Bronze	Total
1	Russia (RUS)	3	0	1	4
2	Japan (JPN)	1	0	0	1
3	United States (USA)	0	2	3	5
4	Canada (CAN)	0	1	0	1
4	Hungary (HUN)	0	1	0	1
Totals (5 entries)		4	4	4	12

== Results ==
=== Men ===
Rank	Name	Nation	Fact. Places	QA	QB	SP	FS
1	Andrei Griazev	Russia	2.4	2		1	1
2	Evan Lysacek	United States	3.6	1		2	2
3	Jordan Brauninger	United States	6.8	5		3	3
4	Alban Préaubert	France	8.4		1	5	5
5	Christopher Mabee	Canada	8.8	6		4	4
6	Kazumi Kishimoto	Japan	12.0	3		8	6
7	Dennis Phan	United States	13.8		3	6	9
8	Sergei Dobrin	Russia	14.0		4	9	7
9	Yannick Ponsero	France	17.8		9	7	10
10	Shawn Sawyer	Canada	19.2	7		14	8
11	Nobunari Oda	Japan	20.2	8		10	11
12	Damien Djordjevic	France	20.2		4	11	12
13	Denis Leushin	Russia	22.6		2	13	14
14	Tomáš Verner	Czech Republic	23.8	4		12	15
15	Martin Liebers	Germany	25.6	9		15	13
16	Przemysław Domański	Poland	30.0		8	18	16
17	Sergei Kotov	Israel	31.6	11		17	17
18	Anton Kovalevski	Ukraine	33.4		10	19	18
19	Yang Zhixue	China	33.8		7	20	19
20	Jamal Othman	Switzerland	36.0		6	21	21
21	Matthew Wilkinson	United Kingdom	38.2	12		24	19
22	Vitali Sazonets	Ukraine	39.6		15	16	24
23	Adrian Schultheiss	Sweden	40.6		12	23	22
24	Marco Fabbri	Italy	40.6		11	22	23
25	Ruben Reus	Netherlands	50.8		18	31	25
Free Skating Not Reached
26	Wu Jialiang	China		10		26	
27	Lee Dong-whun	South Korea		15		25	
28	Ivan Kinčík	Slovakia		13		27	
29	Sergei Shiliaev	Belarus		14		28	
30	Valtter Virtanen	Finland			13	29	
31	Adrian Matei	Romania			14	30	
Short Program Not Reached
32	Michael Chrolenko	Norway		16			
32	Christian Rauchbauer	Austria			16		
34	Tomas Katukevicius	Lithuania			17		
34	Damjan Ostojič	Slovenia		17			
36	Juan Legaz	Spain		18			
37	Konrad Giering	South Africa			19		
37	Wim Hermans	Belgium		19			
39	Sean Carlow	Australia		20			
39	Marc Casal	Andorra			20		
41	Ivan Dimitrov	Bulgaria			21		
41	Miguel Angel Moyron	Mexico		21			
43	Edward Ka-yin Chow	Hong Kong			22		
43	Alper Uçar	Turkey		22			

=== Ladies ===
Rank	Name	Nation	Fact. Places	QB	QA	SP	FS
1	Miki Ando	Japan	2.0		1	1	1
2	Kimmie Meissner	United States	4.6		2	3	2
3	Katy Taylor	United States	5.0	2		2	3
4	Mai Asada	Japan	8.0	1		6	4
5	Aki Sawada	Japan	8.6		3	4	5
6	Viktória Pavuk	Hungary	10.2	3		5	6
7	Lina Johansson	Sweden	14.4	5		9	7
8	Angelina Turenko	Russia	14.4		4	8	8
9	Xu Binshu	China	16.0		7	7	9
10	Cynthia Phaneuf	Canada	18.0		5	10	10
11	Danielle Kahle	United States	22.0	4		14	12
12	Elene Gedevanishvili	Georgia	24.0	6		11	15
13	Jenna McCorkell	United Kingdom	24.2		6	13	14
14	Valentina Marchei	Italy	24.6	7		18	11
15	Alima Gershkovich	Russia	26.4	8		17	13
16	Kiira Korpi	Finland	27.4		8	12	17
17	Denise Zimmermann	Germany	29.2		9	16	16
18	Fleur Maxwell	Luxembourg	32.0	10		15	19
19	Giorgia Carrossa	Italy	35.6	9		20	20
20	Gwendoline Didier	France	37.6		13	24	18
21	Laura Fernandez	Spain	37.6		10	21	21
22	Viktoria Helgesson	Sweden	37.8	11		19	22
23	Teodora Poštič	Slovenia	41.0		12	22	23
24	Evgenia Melnik	Belarus	42.2		11	23	24
25	Kyra Vancrayelynghe	Netherlands	53.2	24		31	25
Free Skating Not Reached
26	Ekaterina Proyda	Ukraine			14	25	
27	Jelena Glebova	Estonia		13		26	
28	Andrea Kreuzer	Austria		12		27	
29	Sonia Radeva	Bulgaria		14		28	
30	Shin Yea-ji	South Korea		15		29	
31	Emilia Ahsan	Australia			15	30	
Short Program Not Reached
32	Hou Na	China		16			
32	Ina Seterbakken	Norway			16		
34	Jacqueline Belenyesiová	Slovakia		17			
34	Kirsten Verbist	Belgium			17		
36	Melissandre Fuentes	Andorra		18			
36	Keren Shua Haim	Israel			18		
38	Cindy Carquillat	Switzerland			19		
38	Tamami Ono	Hong Kong		19			
40	Željka Krizmanić	Croatia		20			
40	Emily Naphtal	Mexico			20		
42	Maria Balaba	Latvia		21			
42	Simona Punga	Romania			21		
44	Megan Allely	South Africa		22			
44	Tiffany Chung	Chinese Taipei			22		
46	Buse Coskun	Turkey		23			
46	Rūta Gajauskaitė	Lithuania			23		
WD	Lucie Krausová	Czech Republic					

=== Pairs ===
Rank	Name	Nation	Fact. Places	SP	FS
1	Natalia Shestakova / Pavel Lebedev	Russia	1.5	1	1
2	Jessica Dubé / Bryce Davison	Canada	3.0	2	2
3	Maria Mukhortova / Maxim Trankov	Russia	4.5	3	3
4	Tatiana Kokareva / Egor Golovkin	Russia	6.0	4	4
5	Tatiana Volosozhar / Petr Kharchenko	Ukraine	7.5	5	5
6	Brittany Vise / Nicholas Kole	United States	9.0	6	6
7	Julia Beloglazova / Andrei Bekh	Ukraine	11.0	8	7
8	Andrea Varraux / David Pelletier	United States	11.5	7	8
9	Brooke Castile / Benjamin Okolski	United States	13.5	9	9
10	Terra Findlay / John Mattatal	Canada	15.5	11	10
11	Rebecca Handke / Daniel Wende	Germany	17.0	12	11
12	Cyriane Felden / Maxime Coia	France	17.0	10	12
13	Julia Shapiro / Vadim Akolzin	Israel	19.5	13	13
14	Rebecca Collett / Hamish Gaman	United Kingdom	21.0	14	14

=== Ice dancing ===
Rank	Name	Nation	Fact. Places	CD1 - QB	CD2 - QB	CD1 - QA	CD2 - QA	OD	FD
1	Elena Romanovskaya / Alexander Grachev	Russia	2.0	1	1			1	1
2	Nóra Hoffmann / Attila Elek	Hungary	3.6			1	1	2	2
3	Morgan Matthews / Maxim Zavozin	United States	5.8			3	2	3	3
4	Natalia Mikhailova / Arkadi Sergeev	Russia	7.4			2	3	4	4
5	Anna Cappellini / Matteo Zanni	Italy	9.0	3	2			5	5
6	Ekaterina Rubleva / Ivan Shefer	Russia	11.6			5	5	6	6
7	Anna Zadorozhniuk / Sergei Verbilo	Ukraine	12.8			4	4	7	7
8	Lauren Senft / Leif Gislason	Canada	15.4	5	5			9	8
9	Alexandra Zaretski / Roman Zaretski	Israel	15.8	2	3			8	10
10	Petra Pachlova / Petr Knoth	Czech Republic	18.6	4	4			10	11
11	Tessa Virtue / Scott Moir	Canada	19.0			7	7	12	9
12	Alla Beknazarova / Vladimir Zuev	Ukraine	22.0			6	6	11	13
13	Meryl Davis / Charlie White	United States	22.2	6	6			13	12
14	Judith Haunstetter / Arne Hoenlein	Germany	26.6			8	8	14	15
15	Pernelle Carron / Edouard Dezutter	France	26.8			10	9	15	14
16	Zsuzsanna Nagy / György Elek	Hungary	28.4	7	7			16	16
17	Sandra Gissmann / Alexander Gazsi	Germany	31.0			9	10	17	17
18	Grete Grunberg / Kristian Rand	Estonia	32.6	8	8			19	18
19	Huang Xintong / Zheng Xun	China	33.4	9	9			18	19
20	Daniela Keller / Fabian Keller	Switzerland	36.4			11	11	20	20
21	Marina Sheltsina / Otar Japaridze	Georgia	38.8	12	11			22	21
22	Michelle Royds / Jamie Whyte	United Kingdom	40.6	10	10			21	24
23	Joanna Budner / Jan Mościcki	Poland	41.0			13	13	23	22
24	Andrea Major / Dejan Illes	Croatia	42.2			12	12	24	23
Free Dance Not Reached
25	Kim Hye-min / Kim Min-woo	South Korea		11	12			25	
26	Anna Galcheniuk / Oleg Krupen	Belarus				14	14	26	
27	Gabrielle Biffin / Tye Nagy	Australia		14	14			27	
28	Tiffany Jones / Daniel O'Hanlon	South Africa		13	13			28	
