= 2006 World Figure Skating Championships =

Annual figure skating competition held in 2006

- Type: ISU Championship
- Date: March 19 – 26
- Season: 2005–06
- Location: Calgary, Canada
- Host: Skate Canada
- Venue: Pengrowth Saddledome

Champions
- Men's singles: (Switzerland) Stéphane Lambiel
- Ladies' singles: (United States) Kimmie Meissner
- Pairs: (China) Pang Qing / Tong Jian
- Ice dance: (Bulgaria) Albena Denkova / Maxim Staviski
- Previous: 2005 World Championships
- Next: 2007 World Championships

The 2006 World Figure Skating Championships was a senior international figure skating competition sanctioned by the International Skating Union. It was held at the Pengrowth Saddledome in Calgary, Canada from March 19 to 26, 2006.

== Medal table ==
Rank	Nation	Gold	Silver	Bronze	Total
1	China (CHN)	1	1	0	2
2	United States (USA)	1	0	3	4
3	Bulgaria (BUL)	1	0	0	1
3	Switzerland (SUI)	1	0	0	1
5	Canada (CAN)	0	1	0	1
5	France (FRA)	0	1	0	1
5	Japan (JPN)	0	1	0	1
8	Russia (RUS)	0	0	1	1
Totals (8 entries)		4	4	4	12

== Competition notes ==
The competition was open to skaters from ISU member nations who had reached the age of 15 by July 1, 2005. The corresponding competition for younger skaters was the 2006 World Junior Championships.

Based on the results of the 2005 World Championships, each country was allowed between one and three entries per discipline. National associations selected their entries based on their own criteria.

None of the gold medalists from the 2006 Olympics competed at the 2006 World Championships. Stéphane Lambiel, the only defending World champion, won his event.

The compulsory dance was the Ravensburger Waltz.

Due to the large number of participants, the ladies and men's qualifying groups were split into groups A and B. This was the last World Championships to have a qualifying round. Following the 2006 Worlds, the ISU Congress voted to remove it. Following these Worlds, all skaters would compete in the short program, with the top twenty-four then advancing to the free skating.

== Results ==
=== Men ===
Rank	Name	Nation	Total points	QA		QB		SP		FS	
1	Stéphane Lambiel	Switzerland	274.22	1	40.23			4	77.41	1	156.58
2	Brian Joubert	France	270.83			3	34.05	1	80.31	2	156.47
3	Evan Lysacek	United States	255.22	2	34.93			8	70.32	3	149.97
4	Nobunari Oda	Japan	251.21			1	36.23	3	78.25	5	136.73
5	Emanuel Sandhu	Canada	249.89	6	28.95			2	78.41	4	142.53
6	Jeffrey Buttle	Canada	241.59			2	34.48	7	73.30	7	133.81
7	Johnny Weir	United States	235.57			4	33.38	5	73.53	8	128.66
8	Alban Préaubert	France	230.95			5	33.18	17	61.62	6	136.15
9	Li Chengjiang	China	229.03	5	31.43			6	73.39	15	124.21
10	Ilia Klimkin	Russia	227.78	3	32.65			10	68.72	10	126.41
11	Matthew Savoie	United States	227.41			8	30.08	9	69.25	9	128.08
12	Sergei Davydov	Belarus	222.44			6	30.83	12	66.07	11	125.54
13	Tomáš Verner	Czech Republic	221.83			7	30.28	11	67.05	14	124.50
14	Gheorghe Chiper	Romania	219.34			9	29.10	15	64.95	12	125.29
15	Zhang Min	China	216.59	4	32.11			19	59.70	13	124.78
16	Anton Kovalevski	Ukraine	211.93	9	28.44			14	65.67	19	117.82
17	Andrei Griazev	Russia	208.37			10	28.83	21	57.96	16	121.58
18	Roman Serov	Israel	207.14	8	28.55			16	64.36	20	114.23
19	Ivan Dinev	Bulgaria	206.86	11	27.39			18	60.57	18	118.90
20	Silvio Smalun	Germany	206.58	7	28.55			13	65.92	21	112.11
21	Shawn Sawyer	Canada	201.05	10	27.80			25	53.23	17	120.02
22	Gregor Urbas	Slovenia	198.54			11	28.72	20	59.60	23	110.22
23	Kristoffer Berntsson	Sweden	192.47			12	25.89	23	56.21	22	110.37
24	Trifun Zivanovic	Serbia and Montenegro	183.05			14	25.22	22	56.39	24	101.44
Free Skating Not Reached
25	Karel Zelenka	Italy	FNR			13	25.75	24	54.66		
26	Viktor Pfeifer	Austria	FNR	12	26.29			26	51.14		
27	Igor Matsipura	Slovakia	FNR	13	25.00			28	50.11		
28	Jamal Othman	Switzerland	FNR	14	24.91			27	50.15		
29	Ari-Pekka Nurmenkari	Finland	FNR	15	23.48			29	49.08		
30	John Hamer	United Kingdom	FNR			15	22.94	30	47.00		
Short Program Not Reached
31	Aidas Reklys	Lithuania	NQD	16	23.19						
32	Sean Carlow	Australia	NQD			16	21.35				
33	Alper Uçar	Turkey	NQD			17	19.78				
34	Bertalan Zakany	Hungary	NQD	17	19.25						
35	Michael Novales	Philippines	NQD			18	19.16				
36	Tristan Thode	New Zealand	NQD	18	18.63						
37	Zeus Issariotis	Greece	NQD	19	17.81						
38	Luis Hernandez	Mexico	NQD			19	16.44				
39	Edward Ka-yin Chow	Hong Kong	NQD			20	15.90				
40	Justin Pietersen	South Africa	NQD	20	13.78						

Panel of judges Men's Qualifying Group A

- Referee: Junko Hiramatsu Japan
- Technical Controller: Steve Winkler United States
- Technical Specialist: Pirjo Uimonen Finland
- Assistant Technical Specialist: Isabel Duval de Navarre Germany
- Judge No.1 Katarina Grof Mitrovic Serbia and Montenegro
- Judge No.2 Merja Kosonen Finland
- Judge No.3 Stanislava Smidova Czech Republic
- Judge No.4 Karin Ehrhardt Austria
- Judge No.5 Francis Betsch France
- Judge No.6 Igor Obraztsov Russia
- Judge No.7 Deborah Islam Canada
- Judge No.8 Allan Böhm Slovakia
- Judge No.9 Deborah Currie United States
- Judge No.10 Nobuhiko Yoshioka Japan

Panel of judges Men's Qualifying Group B

- Referee: Ubavka Novakovic-Kutinou Serbia
- Technical Controller: Benoit Lavoie Canada
- Technical Specialist: Scott Davis United States
- Assistant Technical Specialist: Isabel Duval de Navarre Germany
- Judge No.1 Paolo Pizzocari Italy
- Judge No.2 Katarina Henriksson Sweden
- Judge No.3 Jiasheng Yang China
- Judge No.4 Marina Beschea Romania
- Judge No.5 Heinz-Ulrich Walther Germany
- Judge No.6 Teri Sedej Slovenia
- Judge No.7 Beatrice Pfister Switzerland
- Judge No.8 Alfred Korytek Ukraine
- Judge No.9 Osman Sirvan Turkey
- Judge No.10 Margaret Worsfold United Kingdom

Panel of judges Men's Short program

- Referee: Junko Hiramatsu Japan
- Technical Controller: Benoit Lavoie Canada
- Technical Specialist: Scott Davis United States
- Assistant Technical Specialist: Pirjo Uimonen Finland
- Judge No.1 Beatrice Pfister Switzerland
- Judge No.2 Francis Betsch France
- Judge No.3 Deborah Islam Canada
- Judge No.4 Nobuhiko Yoshioka Japan
- Judge No.5 Merja Kosonen Finland
- Judge No.6 Jiasheng Yang China
- Judge No.7 Heinz-Ulrich Walther Germany
- Judge No.8 Alfred Kprytek Ukraine
- Judge No.9 Allan Böhm Slovakia
- Judge No.10 Stanislava Smidova Czech Republic
- Judge No.11 Teri Sedej Slovenia
- Judge No.12 Marina Beschea Romania

Panel of judges Men's Free skating

- Referee: Junko Hiramatsu Japan
- Technical Controller: Benoit Lavoie Canada
- Technical Specialist: Scott Davis United States
- Assistant Technical Specialist: Pirjo Uimonen Finland
- Judge No.1 Beatrice Pfister Switzerland
- Judge No.2 Francis Betsch France
- Judge No.3 Deborah Islam Canada
- Judge No.4 Nobuhiko Yoshioka Japan
- Judge No.5 Merja Kosonen Finland
- Judge No.6 Jiasheng Yang China
- Judge No.7 Heinz-Ulrich Walther Germany
- Judge No.8 Alfred Korytek Ukraine
- Judge No.9 Allan Böhm Slovakia
- Judge No.10 Stanislava Smidova Czech Republic
- Judge No.11 Teri Sedej Slovenia
- Judge No.12 Marina Beschea Romania

=== Ladies ===
Rank	Name	Nation	Total points	QB		QA		SP		FS	
1	Kimmie Meissner	United States	218.33			2	28.46	5	60.17	1	129.70
2	Fumie Suguri	Japan	209.74			1	28.47	2	62.12	2	119.15
3	Sasha Cohen	United States	208.88			3	27.59	1	66.62	4	114.67
4	Elena Sokolova	Russia	202.27	6	24.42			3	60.98	3	116.87
5	Yukari Nakano	Japan	195.65	2	27.79			6	59.62	6	108.24
6	Sarah Meier	Switzerland	195.11			5	24.64	4	60.51	5	109.96
7	Joannie Rochette	Canada	189.41	1	29.28			7	56.38	8	103.75
8	Emily Hughes	United States	184.75	3	25.68			10	54.23	7	104.84
9	Susanna Pöykiö	Finland	180.06			7	23.13	9	54.28	9	102.65
10	Kiira Korpi	Finland	176.65	5	25.44			11	53.32	10	97.89
11	Yoshie Onda	Japan	172.46			6	23.39	12	52.49	12	96.58
12	Carolina Kostner	Italy	172.45	4	25.64			16	48.95	11	97.86
13	Mira Leung	Canada	168.80			4	24.77	14	49.49	13	94.54
14	Elene Gedevanishvili	Georgia	164.92	9	20.72			8	54.55	17	89.65
15	Idora Hegel	Croatia	163.58	7	23.26			17	48.31	14	92.01
16	Liu Yan	China	159.05	8	21.16			19	46.17	15	91.72
17	Amanda Nylander	Sweden	154.08			10	19.79	18	46.30	19	87.99
18	Tuğba Karademir	Turkey	153.25			14	18.94	22	44.47	16	89.84
19	Arina Martinova	Russia	149.89			13	18.95	15	48.96	21	81.98
20	Galina Efremenko	Ukraine	149.65	14	16.22			21	44.69	18	88.74
21	Anastasia Gimazetdinova	Uzbekistan	149.43	11	19.00			13	49.50	22	80.93
22	Júlia Sebestyén	Hungary	142.30			11	19.77	24	38.53	20	84.00
23	Valentina Marchei	Italy	141.51			12	19.12	20	45.06	23	77.33
24	Annette Dytrt	Germany	137.31	10	19.47			23	41.90	24	75.94
Free Skating Not Reached
25	Viktória Pavuk	Hungary	FNR			8	21.31	28	36.34		
26	Katarina Gerboldt	Russia	FNR	13	17.58			27	36.59		
27	Michelle Cantu	Mexico	FNR			15	15.98	25	38.09		
28	Nadège Bobillier	France	FNR			9	19.89	29	33.61		
29	Andrea Kreuzer	Austria	FNR	15	15.89			26	37.43		
30	Teodora Poštič	Slovenia	FNR	12	18.96			30	30.77		
Short Program Not Reached
31	Miriam Manzano	Australia	NQD			16	15.88				
32	Roxana Luca	Romania	NQD			17	15.53				
33	Tammy Sutan	Thailand	NQD	16	14.83						
34	Sonia Radeva	Bulgaria	NQD	17	14.56						
35	Diane Chen	Chinese Taipei	NQD	18	13.66						
36	Ksenia Jastsenjski	Serbia and Montenegro	NQD	19	13.45						
37	Jacqueline Belenyesiová	Slovakia	NQD			18	13.28				
38	Choi Ji-eun	South Korea	NQD	20	13.23						
39	Olga Zadvornova	Latvia	NQD	21	12.72						
40	Alisa Kireeva	Ukraine	NQD			19	12.49				
41	Jenna-Anne Buys	South Africa	NQD			20	12.35				
42	Laura Fernandez	Spain	NQD	22	11.77						
43	Elena Muhhina	Estonia	NQD			21	10.58				
WD	Kristina Mikhailova	Belarus									

=== Pairs ===
Rank	Name	Nation	Total points	SP		FS	
1	Pang Qing / Tong Jian	China	189.20	2	64.98	1	124.22
2	Zhang Dan / Zhang Hao	China	186.42	1	65.58	4	120.84
3	Maria Petrova / Alexei Tikhonov	Russia	186.22	3	63.04	2	123.18
4	Rena Inoue / John Baldwin	United States	183.17	6	60.90	3	122.27
5	Valérie Marcoux / Craig Buntin	Canada	181.09	4	62.66	5	118.43
6	Aliona Savchenko / Robin Szolkowy	Germany	170.08	5	61.24	7	108.84
7	Jessica Dubé / Bryce Davison	Canada	169.72	7	58.81	6	110.91
8	Julia Obertas / Sergei Slavnov	Russia	164.16	8	55.60	8	108.56
9	Dorota Zagórska / Mariusz Siudek	Poland	160.79	9	55.05	9	105.74
10	Tatiana Volosozhar / Stanislav Morozov	Ukraine	147.90	11	50.87	10	97.03
11	Marcy Hinzmann / Aaron Parchem	United States	140.22	10	52.84	13	87.38
12	Maria Mukhortova / Maxim Trankov	Russia	135.70	12	46.67	12	89.03
13	Marylin Pla / Yannick Bonheur	France	135.02	14	44.55	11	90.47
14	Dominika Piątkowska / Dmitri Khromin	Poland	123.37	13	44.67	14	78.70
15	Rumiana Spassova / Stanimir Todorov	Bulgaria	117.61	16	40.22	15	77.39
16	Marina Aganina / Artem Knyazev	Uzbekistan	114.52	15	41.17	16	73.35
17	Stacey Kemp / David King	United Kingdom	106.10	18	36.14	18	69.96
18	Mari Vartmann / Florian Just	Germany	105.49	19	32.96	17	72.53
19	Julia Beloglazova / Andrei Bekh	Ukraine	104.83	17	37.80	19	67.03
20	Emma Brien / Stuart Beckingham	Australia	86.84	20	31.74	20	55.10

=== Ice dancing ===
Rank	Name	Nation	Total points	CD		OD		FD	
1	Albena Denkova / Maxim Staviski	Bulgaria	199.14	1	38.46	1	60.94	3	99.74
2	Marie-France Dubreuil / Patrice Lauzon	Canada	198.69	2	38.31	3	59.81	1	100.57
3	Tanith Belbin / Benjamin Agosto	United States	196.74	3	37.59	4	59.65	4	99.50
4	Margarita Drobiazko / Povilas Vanagas	Lithuania	195.87	5	36.52	5	59.60	2	99.75
5	Isabelle Delobel / Olivier Schoenfelder	France	195.44	4	37.30	2	60.02	5	98.12
6	Galit Chait / Sergei Sakhnovski	Israel	181.29	6	34.77	7	54.59	6	91.93
7	Oksana Domnina / Maxim Shabalin	Russia	178.39	7	34.11	6	55.06	7	89.22
8	Federica Faiella / Massimo Scali	Italy	172.10	9	32.60	10	51.42	8	88.08
9	Melissa Gregory / Denis Petukhov	United States	171.06	10	32.37	9	52.24	10	86.45
10	Megan Wing / Aaron Lowe	Canada	170.51	8	32.90	8	52.54	11	85.07
11	Sinead Kerr / John Kerr	United Kingdom	167.83	12	30.02	11	51.32	9	86.49
12	Jana Khokhlova / Sergei Novitski	Russia	162.15	11	31.10	16	46.54	12	84.51
13	Christina Beier / William Beier	Germany	154.94	13	29.67	14	46.82	13	78.45
14	Kristin Fraser / Igor Lukanin	Azerbaijan	154.28	14	29.40	13	46.92	15	77.96
15	Nathalie Péchalat / Fabian Bourzat	France	154.00	15	29.31	12	48.28	17	76.41
16	Morgan Matthews / Maxim Zavozin	United States	152.97	16	29.09	18	45.59	14	78.29
17	Nozomi Watanabe / Akiyuki Kido	Japan	152.96	17	28.47	15	46.82	16	77.67
18	Nóra Hoffmann / Attila Elek	Hungary	150.78	18	28.47	17	46.10	18	76.21
19	Alexandra Kauc / Michał Zych	Poland	144.21	19	26.82	20	44.24	19	73.15
20	Alexandra Zaretski / Roman Zaretski	Israel	140.14	24	25.49	22	43.52	20	71.13
21	Anna Zadorozhniuk / Sergei Verbillo	Ukraine	139.72	21	26.03	21	43.70	21	69.99
22	Yu Xiaoyang / Wang Chen	China	136.14	23	25.71	23	40.82	22	69.61
23	Elena Romanovskaya / Alexander Grachev	Russia	135.43	20	26.33	19	45.17	24	63.93
24	Alla Beknazarova / Vladimir Zuev	Ukraine	132.00	22	25.72	24	40.56	23	65.72
Free Dance Not Reached
25	Olga Akimova / Alexander Shakalov	Uzbekistan	FNR	27	23.67	25	39.80		
26	Laura Munana / Luke Munana	Mexico	FNR	26	24.54	27	38.92		
27	Kamila Hájková / David Vincour	Czech Republic	FNR	28	23.44	26	39.41		
28	Natalie Buck / Trent Nelson-Bond	Australia	FNR	29	21.41	28	36.17		
29	Alisa Allapach / Peter Kongkasem	Thailand	FNR	30	21.22	29	34.88		
WD	Anastasia Grebenkina / Vazgen Azrojan	Armenia		25	25.17				
