= 2003–04 ISU Junior Grand Prix =

- Type: ISU Junior Grand Prix
- Season: 2003–04
- Previous: 2002–03 ISU Junior Grand Prix
- Next: 2004–05 ISU Junior Grand Prix

The 2003–04 ISU Junior Grand Prix was the seventh season of the ISU Junior Grand Prix, a series of international junior level competitions organized by the International Skating Union. It was the junior-level complement to the Grand Prix of Figure Skating, which was for senior-level skaters. Skaters competed in the disciplines of men's singles, ladies' singles, pair skating, and ice dance. The top skaters from the series met at the Junior Grand Prix Final.

== Competitions ==
The locations of the JGP events change yearly. In the 2003–04 season, the series was composed of the following events:

Date	Event	Location
September 11–13	2003 JGP Sofia Cup	Sofia, Bulgaria
September 18–21	2003 JGP Skate Slovakia	Bratislava, Slovakia
September 24–28	2003 JGP Mexico Cup	Mexico City, Mexico
October 2–5	2003 JGP Czech Skate	Ostrava, Czech Republic
October 9–12	2003 JGP Skate Bled	Bled, Slovenia
October 16–19	2003 JGP SBC Cup	Okaya, Japan
October 22–26	2003 JGP Croatia Cup	Zagreb, Croatia
Oct. 30 – Nov. 2	2003 JGP Gdańsk Cup	Gdańsk, Poland
December 11–14	2003–04 Junior Grand Prix Final	Malmö, Sweden

== Junior Grand Prix Final qualifiers ==
The following skaters qualified for the 2003–04 Junior Grand Prix Final, in order of qualification.

	Men	Ladies	Pairs	Ice dance
1	(Russia) Andrei Griazev	(Japan) Miki Ando	(Canada) Jessica Dubé / Bryce Davison	(Hungary) Nóra Hoffmann / Attila Elek
2	(United States) Evan Lysacek	(Sweden) Lina Johansson	(Russia) Maria Mukhortova / Maxim Trankov	(Russia) Natalia Mikhailova / Arkadi Sergeev
3	(Czech Republic) Tomáš Verner	(Japan) Mai Asada	(Russia) Tatiana Kokoreva / Egor Golovkin	(Russia) Elena Romanovskaya / Alexander Grachev
4	(Canada) Christopher Mabee	(United States) Danielle Kahle	(Russia) Natalia Shestakova / Pavel Lebedev	(Israel) Alexandra Zaretsky / Roman Zaretsky
5	(United States) Jordan Brauninger	(United States) Kimmie Meissner	(Ukraine) Tatiana Volosozhar / Petr Kharchenko	(Ukraine) Anna Zadorozhniuk / Sergei Verbillo
6	(Russia) Alexander Uspenski	(Hungary) Viktória Pavuk	(United States) Andrea Varraux / David Pelletier	(United States) Morgan Matthews / Maxim Zavozin
7	(Russia) Sergei Dobrin	(Russia) Olga Naidenova	(Russia) Anastasia Kuzmina / Stanislav Evdokimov	(Russia) Olga Orlova / Maxim Bolotin
8	(Japan) Nobunari Oda	(Japan) Akiko Kitamura	(Russia) Arina Ushakova / Alexander Popov	(Russia) Ekaterina Rubleva / Ivan Shefer
Alternates
1st	(France) Alban Préaubert	(United States) Katy Taylor	(United States) Brittany Vise / Nicholas Kole	(Italy) Camilla Spelta / Luca La Notte
2nd	(Japan) Kazumi Kishimoto	(Czech Republic) Lucie Krausová	(Canada) Michelle Cronin / Brian Shales	(Italy) Anna Cappellini / Matteo Zanni
3rd	(Canada) Shawn Sawyer	(Japan) Aki Sawada	(United States) Amy Howerton / Steven Pottenger	(Canada) Lauren Senft / Leif Gislason

Lina Johansson of Sweden was the second qualifier in the ladies' event, and so Sweden did not have a host wildcard entry to the Junior Grand Prix Final.

== Medalists ==
=== Men ===
Competition	Gold	Silver	Bronze	Details
Bulgaria	(Russia) Andrei Griazev	(Czech Republic) Tomáš Verner	(Canada) Shawn Sawyer	
Slovakia	(Russia) Andrei Griazev	(Japan) Nobunari Oda	(Canada) Christopher Mabee	
Mexico	(United States) Jordan Brauninger	(Japan) Takahiko Kozuka	(Canada) Ken Rose	
Czech Rep.	(Czech Republic) Tomáš Verner	(Russia) Sergei Dobrin	(Russia) Alexander Uspenski	
Slovenia	(Canada) Christopher Mabee	(United States) Dennis Phan	(Canada) Shawn Sawyer	
Japan	(United States) Evan Lysacek	(Japan) Kazumi Kishimoto	(Japan) Nobunari Oda	
Croatia	(United States) Evan Lysacek	(France) Alban Préaubert	(Russia) Sergei Dobrin	
Poland	(United States) Parker Pennington	(Russia) Alexander Uspenski	(Japan) Yasuharu Nanri	
Final	(United States) Evan Lysacek	(Russia) Andrei Griazev	(Canada) Christopher Mabee	

=== Ladies ===
Competition	Gold	Silver	Bronze	Details
Bulgaria	(Sweden) Lina Johansson	(United States) Kimmie Meissner	(Canada) Cynthia Phaneuf	
Slovakia	(Japan) Mai Asada	(United States) Katy Taylor	(Russia) Olga Naidenova	
Mexico	(Japan) Miki Ando	(United States) Danielle Kahle	(Canada) Jessica Dubé	
Czech Rep.	(Czech Republic) Lucie Krausová	(Russia) Olga Naidenova	(Japan) Akiko Kitamura	
Slovenia	(United States) Kimmie Meissner	(Sweden) Lina Johansson	(Hungary) Viktória Pavuk	
Japan	(Japan) Miki Ando	(Japan) Mai Asada	(Japan) Aki Sawada	
Croatia	(United States) Danielle Kahle	(Canada) Myriane Samson	(Russia) Elena Naumova	
Poland	(Hungary) Viktória Pavuk	(Japan) Akiko Kitamura	(Finland) Kiira Korpi	
Final	(Japan) Miki Ando	(Sweden) Lina Johansson	(Hungary) Viktória Pavuk	

=== Pairs ===
Competition	Gold	Silver	Bronze	Details
Bulgaria	(Russia) Natalia Shestakova / Pavel Lebedev	(Ukraine) Tatiana Volosozhar / Petr Kharchenko	(United States) Brittany Vise / Nicholas Kole	
Slovakia	(Russia) Tatiana Kokoreva / Egor Golovkin	(Russia) Anastasia Kuzmina / Stanislav Evdokimov	(United States) Amy Howerton / Steven Pottenger	
Mexico	(Canada) Jessica Dubé / Bryce Davison	(United States) Brittany Vise / Nicholas Kole	(Canada) Michelle Cronin / Brian Shales	
Czech Rep.	(Russia) Maria Mukhortova / Maxim Trankov	(Ukraine) Tatiana Volosozhar / Petr Kharchenko	(Russia) Arina Ushakova / Alexander Popov	
Slovenia	(Russia) Tatiana Kokoreva / Egor Golovkin	(Russia) Natalia Shestakova / Pavel Lebedev	(Canada) Terra Findlay / John Mattatal	
Japan	(Canada) Jessica Dubé / Bryce Davison	(Canada) Michelle Cronin / Brian Shales	(United States) Brooke Castile / Benjamin Okolski	
Croatia	(United States) Andrea Varraux / David Pelletier	(United States) Amy Howerton / Steven Pottenger	(Russia) Anastasia Kuzmina / Stanislav Evdokimov	
Poland	(Russia) Maria Mukhortova / Maxim Trankov	(Russia) Arina Ushakova / Alexander Popov	(United States) Brandilyn Sandoval / Laureano Ibarra	
Final	(Canada) Jessica Dubé / Bryce Davison	(Russia) Natalia Shestakova / Pavel Lebedev	(Russia) Maria Mukhortova / Maxim Trankov	

=== Ice dance ===
Competition	Gold	Silver	Bronze	Details
Bulgaria	(Hungary) Nóra Hoffmann / Attila Elek	(Italy) Camilla Spelta / Luca La Notte	(Russia) Anastasia Platonova / Andrei Maximishin	
Slovakia	(Russia) Elena Romanovskaya / Alexander Grachev	(Ukraine) Anna Zadorozhniuk / Sergei Verbillo	(United States) Morgan Matthews / Maxim Zavozin	
Mexico	(Russia) Natalia Mikhailova / Arkadi Sergeev	(Israel) Alexandra Zaretsky / Roman Zaretsky	(Italy) Anna Cappellini / Matteo Zanni	
Czech Rep.	(Ukraine) Anna Zadorozhniuk / Sergei Verbillo	(Russia) Olga Orlova / Maxim Bolotin	(Czech Republic) Petra Pachlová / Petr Knoth	
Slovenia	(Hungary) Nóra Hoffmann / Attila Elek	(Russia) Ekaterina Rubleva / Ivan Shefer	(Italy) Anna Cappellini / Matteo Zanni	
Japan	(Russia) Natalia Mikhailova / Arkadi Sergeev	(Russia) Elena Romanovskaya / Alexander Grachev	(Canada) Lauren Senft / Leif Gislason	
Croatia	(United States) Morgan Matthews / Maxim Zavozin	(Russia) Olga Orlova / Maxim Bolotin	(Italy) Camilla Spelta / Luca La Notte	
Poland	(Israel) Alexandra Zaretsky / Roman Zaretsky	(Russia) Ekaterina Rubleva / Ivan Shefer	(United States) Kirsten Frisch / Augie Hill	
Final	(Hungary) Nóra Hoffmann / Attila Elek	(Russia) Elena Romanovskaya / Alexander Grachev	(United States) Morgan Matthews / Maxim Zavozin	

== Medals table ==
Rank	Nation	Gold	Silver	Bronze	Total
1	Russia (RUS)	10	14	8	32
2	United States (USA)	9	6	7	22
3	Japan (JPN)	4	5	4	13
4	Canada (CAN)	4	2	10	16
5	Hungary (HUN)	4	0	2	6
6	Czech Republic (CZE)	2	1	1	4
7	Ukraine (UKR)	1	3	0	4
8	Sweden (SWE)	1	2	0	3
9	Israel (ISR)	1	1	0	2
10	Italy (ITA)	0	1	3	4
11	France (FRA)	0	1	0	1
12	Finland (FIN)	0	0	1	1
Totals (12 entries)		36	36	36	108
