= 2005 World Junior Figure Skating Championships =

- Type: ISU Championship
- Date: February 28 – March 6
- Season: 2004–05
- Location: Kitchener, Canada
- Venue: The Aud - Dom Cardillo Arena

Champions
- Men's singles: (Japan) Nobunari Oda
- Ladies' singles: (Japan) Mao Asada
- Pairs: (Russia) Maria Mukhortova / Maxim Trankov
- Ice dance: (United States) Morgan Matthews / Maxim Zavozin
- Previous: 2004 World Junior Championships
- Next: 2006 World Junior Championships

The 2005 World Junior Figure Skating Championships were held at The Aud - Dom Cardillo Arena in Kitchener, Canada from February 28 to March 6. The event is open to figure skaters from ISU member nations who have reached the age of 13 by July 1 of the previous year, but have not yet turned 19. The upper age limit for men competing in pairs and dance is 21. Skaters compete in four disciplines: men's singles, ladies' singles, pair skating, and ice dancing.

The term "Junior" refers to the age level rather than the skill level. Therefore, some of the skaters competing had competed nationally and internationally at the senior level, but were still age-eligible for World Juniors.

The compulsory dance was the Blues. Due to the large number of participants, the men's and ladies' qualifying groups were split into groups A and B. Scores did not carry over from qualifying and so were not factored into the total score or placements.

== Medals table ==
Rank	Nation	Gold	Silver	Bronze	Total
1	Japan (JPN)	2	0	0	2
2	Russia (RUS)	1	0	3	4
3	United States (USA)	1	0	1	2
4	Canada (CAN)	0	2	0	2
5	France (FRA)	0	1	0	1
5	South Korea (KOR)	0	1	0	1
Totals (6 entries)		4	4	4	12

== Results ==
=== Men ===
Rank	Name	Nation	Total points	QA		QB		SP		FS	
1	Nobunari Oda	Japan	196.42	1	121.30			2	64.33	1	132.09
2	Yannick Ponsero	France	185.45	3	109.34			1	64.90	2	120.55
3	Sergei Dobrin	Russia	179.02			5	104.80	3	60.18	4	118.84
4	Jordan Brauninger	United States	178.32			2	110.58	5	59.00	3	119.32
5	Guan Jinlin	China	166.45			8	90.42	6	57.04	5	109.41
6	Yasuharu Nanri	Japan	162.94	7	96.34			4	59.60	9	103.34
7	Patrick Chan	Canada	161.01	2	110.22			11	53.24	6	107.77
8	Shaun Rogers	United States	160.73			4	107.64	7	55.72	7	105.01
9	Alban Préaubert	France	153.03			3	108.00	8	55.12	12	97.91
10	Christopher Mabee	Canada	153.02	14	72.12			9	54.78	11	98.24
11	Jérémie Colot	France	152.82	4	101.50			16	48.36	8	104.46
12	Viktor Pfeifer	Austria	152.57	6	97.28			12	52.97	10	99.60
13	Adrian Schultheiss	Sweden	145.96	5	100.50			10	54.71	15	91.25
14	Przemysław Domański	Poland	139.14			7	95.10	18	45.60	13	93.54
15	Juan Legaz	Spain	138.88	9	79.90			13	50.42	16	88.46
16	Elliot Hilton	United Kingdom	136.83			13	75.56	19	45.03	14	91.80
17	Clemens Brummer	Germany	131.38	11	77.20			15	48.74	20	82.64
18	Moris Pfeifhofer	Switzerland	130.88			11	80.64	17	48.04	19	82.84
19	Paolo Bacchini	Italy	130.63	8	88.46			22	43.28	17	87.35
20	Valtter Virtanen	Finland	129.08	10	78.22			20	44.59	18	84.49
21	Vitali Sazonets	Ukraine	121.08	12	73.18			23	43.00	21	78.08
22	Luka Čadež	Slovenia	117.08	13	72.16			21	44.29	22	72.79
23	Michael Chrolenko	Norway	107.18	15	66.32			24	41.08	23	66.10
WD	Alexander Uspenski	Russia				1	113.30	14	50.00		
Free Skating Not Reached
25	Wesley Campbell	United States	FNR			9	90.28	25	39.24		
26	Tomáš Janečko	Czech Republic	FNR			10	88.30	26	38.40		
27	Georgi Kenchadze	Bulgaria	FNR			14	68.98	27	35.81		
28	Taras Rajec	Slovakia	FNR			12	78.06	28	35.43		
29	Tomas Katukevicius	Lithuania	FNR			15	68.78	29	32.42		
WD	Sergei Voronov	Russia				6	96.34				
Short Program Not Reached
	Evgeni Krasnapolski	Israel	NQD	16	65.54						
	Robert McNamara	Australia	NQD			16	64.72				
	Miguel Angel Moyron	Mexico	NQD	17	62.72						
	Joel Watson	New Zealand	NQD			17	60.00				
	Justin Pietersen	South Africa	NQD			18	58.88				
	Boris Martinec	Croatia	NQD	18	57.08						
	Kutay Eryoldas	Turkey	NQD			19	56.06				
	Andy Chen	Chinese Taipei	NQD			20	49.58				
	Zoltán Kelemen	Romania	NQD	19	47.94						
	Phanyaluck Raisuksiri	Thailand	NQD	20	33.20						

=== Ladies ===
Rank	Name	Nation	Total points	QA		QB		SP		FS	
1	Mao Asada	Japan	179.24	1	112.32			1	60.11	1	119.13
2	Kim Yuna	South Korea	158.93			1	102.98	6	48.67	2	110.26
3	Emily Hughes	United States	147.89			6	83.12	5	51.42	3	96.47
4	Kimmie Meissner	United States	146.63	4	81.94			3	52.67	4	93.96
5	Elene Gedevanishvili	Georgia	139.11	6	70.28			7	48.42	5	90.69
6	Alissa Czisny	United States	136.99	8	69.26			2	52.91	8	84.08
7	Xu Binshu	China	136.22	3	85.12			4	51.61	7	84.61
8	Mira Leung	Canada	132.66			2	91.92	12	43.22	6	89.44
9	Aki Sawada	Japan	130.49	2	93.38			8	47.77	9	82.72
10	Kiira Korpi	Finland	126.63			4	88.12	11	43.93	10	82.70
11	Amanda Billings	Canada	121.35	5	79.42			9	45.93	12	75.42
12	Veronika Kropotina	Russia	119.75			7	77.82	10	45.85	13	73.90
13	Lilia Biktagirova	Russia	113.54			3	89.32	22	36.45	11	77.09
14	Akiko Kitamura	Japan	111.02			5	83.34	17	38.91	15	72.11
15	Amanda Nylander	Sweden	110.20	7	69.80			21	36.78	14	73.42
16	Valentina Marchei	Italy	104.74			8	70.94	15	40.60	18	64.14
17	Ekaterina Proyda	Ukraine	104.64			11	63.08	14	40.84	19	63.80
18	Isabelle Nylander	Sweden	103.08			12	61.82	24	33.59	16	69.49
19	Nadège Bobillier	France	102.43			9	66.80	19	37.32	17	65.11
20	Jelena Glebova	Estonia	100.64	15	53.80			16	39.75	22	60.89
21	Tammy Sutan	Thailand	100.53			13	59.94	18	38.05	21	62.48
22	Tamar Katz	Israel	98.00	12	57.68			13	41.95	24	56.05
23	Radka Bártová	Slovakia	97.85	9	61.12			23	34.47	20	63.38
24	Ilona Senderek	Poland	96.58			10	65.18	20	36.81	23	59.77
Free Skating Not Reached
25	Cindy Carquillat	Switzerland	FNR	11	59.20			25	33.34		
26	Bianka Padar	Hungary	FNR	10	59.52			26	32.81		
27	Emily Naphtal	Mexico	FNR			14	54.34	27	31.13		
28	Jody Annandale	United Kingdom	FNR			15	52.82	28	29.27		
29	Phoebe Di Tommaso	Australia	FNR	14	54.30			29	29.11		
30	Jocelyn Ho	Chinese Taipei	FNR	13	54.36			30	27.97		
Short Program Not Reached
	Tünde Sepa	Hungary	NQD			16	52.36				
	Anna Bernauer	Luxembourg	NQD	16	50.34						
	Sharon Resseler	Netherlands	NQD	17	49.18						
	Kathrin Freudelsperger	Austria	NQD			17	47.80				
	Megan Allely	South Africa	NQD			18	46.42				
	Maria Dikanovic	Croatia	NQD			19	46.24				
	Maria Balaba	Latvia	NQD	18	45.82						
	Inmaculada Robledo	Spain	NQD	19	45.46						
	Nina Ivanova	Bulgaria	NQD			20	45.40				
	Roxana Boamfa	Romania	NQD	20	43.62						
	Beril Bektas	Turkey	NQD	21	41.34						
	Rūta Gajauskaitė	Lithuania	NQD			21	41.30				
	Emma Hagieva	Azerbaijan	NQD	22	37.06						

=== Pairs ===
Rank	Name	Nation	Total points	SP		FS	
1	Maria Mukhortova / Maxim Trankov	Russia	150.91	3	52.58	1	98.33
2	Jessica Dubé / Bryce Davison	Canada	146.56	2	53.89	2	92.67
3	Tatiana Kokoreva / Egor Golovkin	Russia	144.12	1	54.46	3	89.66
4	Mariel Miller / Rockne Brubaker	United States	139.64	4	51.54	5	88.10
5	Angelika Pylkina / Niklas Hogner	Sweden	138.01	5	48.39	4	89.62
6	Elena Efaieva / Alexei Menshikov	Russia	131.16	10	44.27	6	86.89
7	Michelle Cronin / Brian Shales	Canada	130.35	9	44.72	7	85.63
8	Meagan Duhamel / Ryan Arnold	Canada	129.95	6	47.86	8	82.09
9	Julia Vlassov / Drew Meekins	United States	121.10	7	45.42	9	75.68
10	An Ni / Wu Yiming	China	113.90	11	40.57	10	73.33
11	Stacey Kemp / David King	United Kingdom	109.52	12	39.71	11	69.81
12	Alina Dikhtiar / Filip Zalevski	Ukraine	105.46	13	38.40	12	67.06
13	Klara Zoubkova / Miroslav Verner	Czech Republic	98.08	15	36.01	13	62.07
14	Julia Goreeva / Roman Talan	Ukraine	94.57	14	38.24	14	56.33
WD	Rebecca Handke / Daniel Wende	Germany		8	44.81		

=== Ice dancing ===
Rank	Name	Nation	Total points	CD		OD		FD	
1	Morgan Matthews / Maxim Zavozin	United States	187.51	1	39.89	1	58.89	1	88.73
2	Tessa Virtue / Scott Moir	Canada	183.42	2	36.91	2	58.33	2	88.18
3	Anastasia Gorshkova / Ilia Tkachenko	Russia	167.22	4	34.58	3	55.35	4	77.29
4	Alexandra Zaretski / Roman Zaretski	Israel	165.76	3	36.58	4	52.82	5	76.36
5	Natalia Mikhailova / Arkadi Sergeev	Russia	162.08	7	33.92	6	50.42	3	77.74
6	Anastasia Platonova / Andrei Maximishin	Russia	160.40	6	34.02	5	50.90	6	75.48
7	Siobhan Karam / Joshua McGrath	Canada	153.45	8	32.26	7	47.97	7	73.22
8	Trina Pratt / Todd Gilles	United States	143.92	9	32.06	16	40.34	8	71.52
9	Camilla Pistorello / Luca La Notte	Italy	136.66	10	30.48	11	44.14	12	62.04
10	Kamila Hájková / David Vincour	Czech Republic	136.53	14	29.07	9	44.52	11	62.94
11	Petra Pachlova / Petr Knoth	Czech Republic	135.69	13	29.40	12	42.28	9	64.01
12	Rina Thieleke / Sascha Rabe	Germany	134.10	19	26.59	10	44.33	10	63.18
13	Pernelle Carron / Edouard Dezutter	France	131.67	11	29.86	14	41.57	13	60.24
14	Huang Xintong / Zheng Xun	China	131.45	12	29.58	13	41.97	14	59.90
15	Grethe Grünberg / Kristian Rand	Estonia	126.85	16	27.80	17	39.89	15	59.16
16	Joanna Budner / Jan Mościcki	Poland	124.42	18	26.73	15	40.49	16	57.20
17	Alina Saprikina / Pavel Khimich	Ukraine	119.21	17	27.76	18	38.08	17	53.37
18	Elena Georgieva / Mikhail Tikhonravov	Ukraine	112.02	20	24.90	21	35.25	18	51.87
19	Kayla Nicole Frey / Deividas Stagniūnas	Lithuania	105.91	21	23.48	20	36.03	20	46.40
20	Nora von Bergen / Boris Räber	Switzerland	103.76	23	21.38	22	33.18	19	49.20
21	Olivia Lalatka / Gabor Balint	Hungary	99.56	22	22.59	23	31.31	21	45.66
22	Anna Galcheniuk / Oleg Krupen	Belarus	93.96	25	19.41	24	31.07	22	43.48
WD	Anna Cappellini / Matteo Zanni	Italy		4	34.58	8	47.09		
WD	Zsuzsanna Nagy / György Elek	Hungary		15	27.96	19	37.86		
Free Dance Not Reached
25	Simona Kopsova / Gabriel Mistelbauer	Austria	FNR	24	19.79	26	26.96		
26	Danielle O'Brien / Gregory Merriman	Australia	FNR	26	16.81	25	28.94		
27	Ina Demireva / Tsvetan Georgiev	Bulgaria	FNR	27	13.16	27	23.15		
