= Ken Rose (figure skater) =

Canadian figure skater

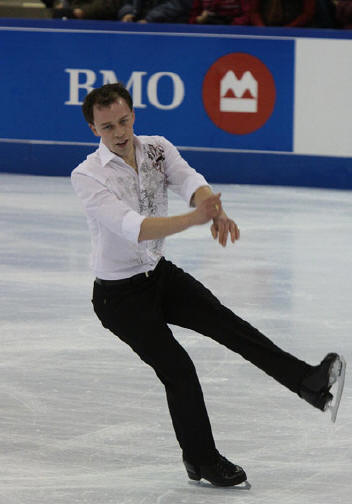
- 2009 Canadian Figure Skating Championships, Ken Rose

Personal information
- Born: May 16, 1986 (age 40) Newmarket, Ontario
- Height: 1.70 m (5 ft 7 in)

Figure skating career
- Country: Canada
- Skating club: Richmond Hill FSC
- Began skating: 1993
- Retired: 2009

Ken Rose (born May 16, 1986) is a Canadian former competitive figure skater. He is the 2006 Merano Cup champion and 2003 Canadian junior national champion. He won a pair of bronze medals on the ISU Junior Grand Prix circuit and placed 13th at the 2004 World Junior Championships. Rose began skating at age seven and was coached by Linda Bridge for many years. He later trained at the Mariposa School of Skating under Doug Leigh.

After retiring from competition, Rose became a skating coach at the Richmond Training Centre in Richmond Hill, Ontario. His wife, Danielle, is also a coach at the club. Ken and Danielle took over as owners and directors of the Richmond Training Centre in 2022.

== Programs ==
Season	Short program	Free skating
2004–2005	The Mask of Zorro by James Horner	Pirates of the Caribbean by Klaus Badelt
2002–2003	Finale from Xotica by René Dupéré	Capriccio Italien by Pyotr Ilyich Tchaikovsky

== Competitive highlights ==
International
Event	01–02	02–03	03–04	04–05	05–06	06–07	07–08	08–09
Merano Cup						1st		
International: Junior
Junior Worlds			13th					
JGP France		7th						
JGP Hungary				6th				
JGP Japan			5th					
JGP Mexico			3rd					
JGP Sweden	7th							
JGP USA		3rd						
Gardena	7th							
National
Canadians	4th J	1st J	10th	12th	11th	8th	7th	8th
JGP = Junior Grand Prix; J = Junior level
