= Vitali Sazonets =

Ukrainian figure skater

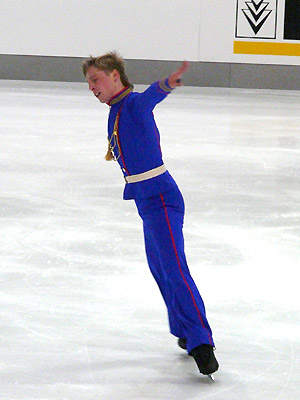
- Sazonets in 2007.

Personal information
- Native name: Віталій Сазонець
- Born: 8 March 1988 (age 38) Dnipro, Ukrainian SSR
- Height: 1.73 m (5 ft 8 in)

Figure skating career
- Country: Ukraine
- Coach: Maryna Amirkhanova, Oleksandr Zelensky, Yuri Sukholentsev
- Skating club: Meteor Dnipro

Vitali Sazonets (Ukrainian: Віталій Сазонець, born 8 March 1988 in Dnipro) is a Ukrainian former competitive figure skater. He is the 2008 national champion and reached the free skate at four ISU Championships – 2004 Junior Worlds in The Hague, Netherlands; 2005 Junior Worlds in Kitchener, Ontario, Canada; 2006 Junior Worlds in Ljubljana, Slovenia; and 2008 Europeans in Zagreb, Croatia.

== Programs ==
| Season | Short program | Free skating |
|---|---|---|
| 2009–2010 | Bolero by Maurice Ravel | The Turkish Gambit by Goran Bregović, Andrei Feofanov |
| 2008–2009 | Sundance of Adygeia (from "Golden Hits of Caucasian Music") | The Turkish Gambit by Goran Bregović, Andrei Feofanov |
| 2005–2006 | La Leyenda del Beso by Raúl Di Blasio | The Last Opera by Saint-Preux |
| 2004–2005 | Allegretto by Karl Jenkins | The Last Opera by Saint-Preux |
| 2003–2004 | Prelude in C by Johann Sebastian Bach | Prestige; Iberia Siempre Iberia; Prelude by Paul Mauriat, Rondò Veneziano |

== Results ==
JGP: Junior Grand Prix

International
| Event | 03–04 | 04–05 | 05–06 | 06–07 | 07–08 | 08–09 | 09–10 | 10–11 |
|---|---|---|---|---|---|---|---|---|
| Europeans | | | | | 20th | | | |
| Finlandia Trophy | | | | | | | 18th | |
| Golden Spin | | | | | | 4th | | WD |
| Nebelhorn Trophy | | | | | 12th | | | |
| NRW Trophy | | | | | | | 14th | |
| Universiade | | | | | | 16th | | |
International: Junior
| Junior Worlds | 22nd | 21st | 24th | | | | | |
| JGP Bulgaria | | | 9th | | | | | |
| JGP Estonia | | | 7th | | | | | |
| JGP Germany | | 22nd | | | | | | |
| JGP Hungary | | 16th | | | | | | |
| JGP Romania | | | | 13th | | | | |
National
| Ukrainian | | 4th | 3rd | | 1st | 2nd | 2nd | |
| Ukrainian Junior | 2nd | 1st | | | | | | |
WD: Withdrew
