= Elena Romanovskaya =

Russian ice dancer

Personal information
- Full name: Elena Kostantinovna Romanovskaya
- Born: 3 December 1984 (age 41) Moscow, Russian SFSR, Soviet Union
- Height: 1.70 m (5 ft 7 in)

Figure skating career
- Country: Russia
- Skating club: Lokomotiv Moscow
- Began skating: 1989
Medal record
Representing Russia
Figure skating: Ice dancing
World Junior Championships
Gold medal – first place	2004 The Hague	Ice dancing
Bronze medal – third place	2003 Ostrava	Ice dancing
Bronze medal – third place	2002 Hamar	Ice dancing
Junior Grand Prix Final
Silver medal – second place	2003–04 Malmö	Ice dancing
Silver medal – second place	2001–02 Bled	Ice dancing
Bronze medal – third place	2002–03 The Hague	Ice dancing

Elena Kostantinovna Romanovskaya (Russian: Елена Константиновна Романовская; born 3 December 1984) is a Russian former competitive ice dancer. With partner Alexander Grachev, she won the 2004 World Junior title.

== Programs ==
(with Grachev)

Season	Original dance	Free dance
2005–2006	Rhumba: Cantinero de Cuba; Cha cha: Santa Esmeralda; Samba	Flamenco; Music by Gypsy Kings
2004–2005	Slow foxtrot; Quickstep: Jumpin Jack by Big Bad Voodoo Daddy	Music Was my First Love
2003–2004	Blues; Rock'n Roll	Libertango by Astor Piazzolla
2002–2003	Masquerade Waltz by Aram Khachaturian; Galop	Holding Out for a Hero; Total Eclipse of the Heart by Bonnie Tyler
2001–2002	Flamenco; Tango Felicia	GoldenEye
2000–2001	Foxtrot: Sixteen Tons; Quickstep	Blues; Jumping Jack; Disco
1999–2000	Latin mix	Riverdance
1998–1999	Beware of the Car by Andrei Petrov	Romeo & Juliet

== Competitive highlights ==
GP: Grand Prix; JGP: Junior Grand Prix

with Grachev

International
Event	99–00	00–01	01–02	02–03	03–04	04–05	05–06
World Champ.							23rd
GP NHK Trophy							6th
GP Skate America						11th	
GP Skate Canada							5th
Winter Universiade						4th	
International: Junior
World Junior Champ.		6th	3rd	3rd	1st		
JGP Final		5th	2nd	3rd	2nd		
JGP Germany		3rd					
JGP Italy				2nd			
JGP Japan					2nd		
JGP Netherlands			1st				
JGP Poland		1st					
JGP Slovakia				1st	1st		
JGP Sweden			1st				
National
Russian Champ.						4th	4th
Russian Jr. Champ.	7th	4th	2nd	2nd	2nd		
