= Tatiana Kokoreva =

Russian pair skater

Personal information
- Full name: Tatiana Evgenievna Kokoreva
- Born: 1 August 1988 (age 38) Lipetsk, Russian SFSR, Soviet Union
- Height: 1.64 m (5 ft 4 1/2 in)

Figure skating career
- Country: Russia
- Skating club: Yubileyny
- Began skating: 1992
Medal record
Figure skating: Pairs
Representing Russia
World Junior Championships
Bronze medal – third place	2005 Kitchener	Pairs

Tatiana Alexandrovna Kokoreva (Russian: Татьяна Александровна Кокорева; born 1 August 1988) is a Russian former pair skater. With former partner Egor Golovkin, she is the 2005 World Junior bronze medalist.

== Programs ==
(with Golovkin)

Season	Short program	Free skating	Exhibition
2004–2005	Paraphrase by Dmitri Shostakovich	The Lady and the Hooligan by Dmitri Shostakovich	
2003–2004	Swan Lake by Pyotr Tchaikovsky	La gazza ladra by Gioachino Rossini	Ave Maria
2002–2003	Golden Piano	Music by Gioachino Rossini	

== Competitive highlights ==
(with Golovkin)

Results
International
Event	2002–2003	2003–2004	2004–2005
World Junior Championships	WD	4th	3rd
JGP Final		5th	
JGP China	3rd		
JGP Romania			1st
JGP Serbia			4th
JGP Slovakia		1st	
JGP Slovenia		1st	
National
Russian Championships			7th
Russian Junior Champ.	1st	3rd	3rd
JGP = Junior Grand Prix; WD = Withdrew
