= Egor Golovkin =

Russian former pair skater (born 1983)

Personal information
- Full name: Egor Alexeyevich Golovkin
- Born: 9 December 1983 (age 42) Moscow
- Height: 1.93 m (6 ft 4 in)

Figure skating career
- Country: Russia
- Skating club: Yubileyny
- Began skating: 1987
Medal record
Figure skating: Pairs
Representing Russia
World Junior Championships
Bronze medal – third place	2005 Kitchener	Pairs

Egor Alexeyevich Golovkin (Russian: Егор Алексеевич Головкин; born 9 December 1983 in Moscow) is a Russian former pair skater. With former partner Tatiana Kokoreva, he is the 2005 World Junior bronze medalist.

Prior to Kokoreva, he skated with Maria Mukhortova. After splitting from Kokoreva, Golovkin teamed up with Canadian Jericho Boulin but the pair withdrew from the 2007 Canadian Championships before the short program.

== Programs ==
(with Kokoreva)

Season	Short program	Free skating	Exhibition
2004–2005	Paraphrase by Dmitri Shostakovich	The Lady and the Hooligan by Dmitri Shostakovich	
2003–2004	Swan Lake by Pyotr Tchaikovsky	La gazza ladra by Gioachino Rossini	Ave Maria
2002–2003	Golden Piano	Music by Gioachino Rossini	

== Competitive highlights ==
(with Kokoreva)

Results
International
Event	2002–2003	2003–2004	2004–2005
World Junior Championships	WD	4th	3rd
JGP Final		5th	
JGP China	3rd		
JGP Romania			1st
JGP Serbia			4th
JGP Slovakia		1st	
JGP Slovenia		1st	
National
Russian Championships			7th
Russian Junior Champ.	1st	3rd	3rd
JGP = Junior Grand Prix; WD = Withdrew
