= Natalia Shestakova =

Russian former pair skater (born 1988)

Personal information
- Full name: Natalia Sergeyevna Shestakova
- Born: 18 October 1988 (age 37) Perm, Russian SFSR, Soviet Union
- Height: 1.56 m (5 ft 1 1/2 in)

Figure skating career
- Country: Russia
Medal record
Representing Russia
Figure skating: Pairs
World Junior Championships
Gold medal – first place	2004 The Hague	Pairs
Junior Grand Prix Final
Silver medal – second place	2003–04 Malmö	Pairs

Natalia Sergeyevna Shestakova (Russian: Наталья Серге́евна Шестакова; born 18 October 1988) is a Russian former pair skater. With Pavel Lebedev, she is the 2004 World Junior Champion. Earlier, she competed with Maxim Trankov.

== Programs ==
(with Lebedev)

Season	Short program	Free skating
2005–2006	The Nutcracker by Pyotr Tchaikovsky	Piano Concerto by Camille Saint-Saëns
2004–2005	Arabic Mix by V. Selvaganesh	Xotica (from Cirque du Soleil) by René Dupéré
2003–2004	The Seventh Bullet	The Matrix by Rob Dougan

== Competitive highlights ==
(with Lebedev)

Results
International
Event	2003–2004	2004–2005	2005–2006
GP Bompard			5th
GP Cup of China			5th
GP Cup of Russia		9th	
GP NHK Trophy		6th	
International: Junior
Junior Worlds	1st		
JGP Final	2nd		
JGP Bulgaria	1st		
JGP Slovenia	2nd		
National
Russian Champ.	5th	5th	4th
Russian Jr. Champ.	2nd		
GP = Grand Prix; JGP = Junior Grand Prix
