= Nadège Bobillier =

French figure skater

Personal information
- Born: 22 January 1988 (age 38) Annecy, Haute-Savoie
- Height: 1.65 m (5 ft 5 in)

Figure skating career
- Country: France
- Retired: 2007

Nadège Bobillier (born 22 January 1988 in Annecy, Haute-Savoie) is a French former competitive figure skater. She is the 2005 and 2006 French national champion. She competed at the 2006 World Figure Skating Championships and the 2006 European Figure Skating Championships.

== Competitive highlights ==
GP: Grand Prix

International
Event	2004–05	2005–06	2006–07
World Champ.		28th	
European Champ.		17th	
GP Trophée Bompard		11th	9th
Crystal Skate		2nd	
International: Junior
World Junior Champ.	19th	20th	
National
French Champ.	1st	1st	5th

== Programs ==
Season	Short program	Free skating
2005–07	Concerto Pour Deux Voix by Saint Preux	Legende d'Automne; La Lecon de Piano
