= Terra Findlay =

French-Canadian ice dancer

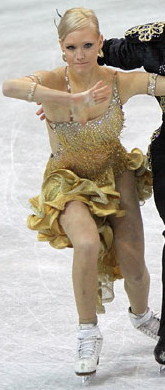

Personal information
- Full name: Terra Findlay
- Born: May 3, 1990 (age 36) Sault Ste. Marie, Ontario, Canada
- Height: 1.75 m (5 ft 9 in)

Terra Findlay (born May 3, 1990) is a French-Canadian ice dancer who has also competed for France.

== Personal life ==
Findlay was born in Sault Ste. Marie, Ontario, Canada. Her mother is a figure skating coach and her father and brother are hockey players. She moved to Barrie, Ontario at a young age to pursue pairs skating for Canada. Then after switching to Ice Dance, Findlay moved to France to compete with Richaud and lived in Lyon during their competitive career.

Findlay is now a graduate of the College of Sports Media in Toronto, Ontario and a broadcast journalist and coach with Skate Canada.

== Career ==
Through 2005, Findlay competed as a single skater. She competed on the international level in singles for Canada, placing 6th on the novice level at the 2003 Triglav Trophy.

From 2003 through 2005, Findlay competed for Canada as a pair skater with partner John Mattatall. They were the 2004 Canadian junior silver medalists and placed 10th at the 2004 World Junior Championships. They were coached by Doug Leigh and Lee Barkell at the Mariposa School of Skating.

After that partnership ended in 2005, Findlay switched to ice dancing because she was growing too tall for pairs and teamed up with Liam Dougherty. They competed on the national level through 2007.

In November 2007, she teamed up with partner Benoît Richaud to compete for France. That season they were the 2008 Junior French silver medalists. In 2009, they became the French Junior Champions and the French bronze medalists. Their partnership ended following the 2008-2009 season.

== Competitive highlights ==
=== Ice dancing with Richaud for France ===
International
Event	2008–09
European Championships	19th
International: Junior
World Junior Championships	10th
JGP Belarus	3rd
JGP France	4th
National
French Championships	3rd
JGP = Junior Grand Prix

=== Ice dancing with Dougherty for Canada ===
National
Event	2005–06	2006–07
Canadian Championships	8th	7th

=== Pairs with Mattatall for Canada ===
International
Event	2002–03	2003–04	2004–05
Nebelhorn Trophy			4th
International: Junior
World Junior Championships		10th	
JGP Slovenia		3rd	
JGP Slovakia		4th	
National
Canadian Championships	4th J.	2nd J.	7th
J. = Junior level; JGP = Junior Grand Prix

=== Single skating for Canada ===
Event	2003–04	2004–05
National
Canadian Championships	12th J.	13th J.
J. = Junior
