= Maria Mukhortova =

Russian pair skater

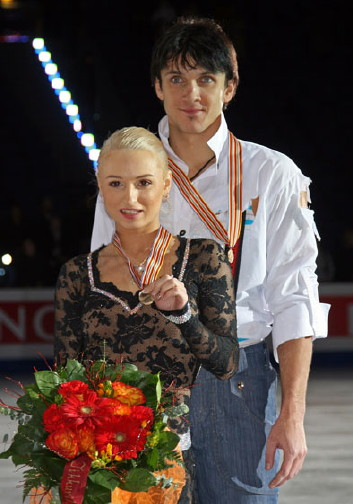
- Mukhortova and Trankov at the 2009 Europeans.

Personal information
- Full name: Maria Vladimirovna Mukhortova
- Born: 20 November 1985 (age 40) Leningrad, Russian SFSR, Soviet Union
- Height: 1.62 m (5 ft 4 in)

Figure skating career
- Country: Russia
- Coach: Oleg Vasiliev
- Skating club: St. Petersburg Skating School
Medal record
Pairs' Figure skating
Representing Russia (with Trankov)
European Championships
Bronze medal – third place	2010 Tallinn	Pairs
Bronze medal – third place	2009 Helsinki	Pairs
Silver medal – second place	2008 Zagreb	Pairs
Russian Championships
Gold medal – first place	2007 Mytishchi	Pairs
Silver medal – second place	2008 Saint Petersburg	Pairs
Silver medal – second place	2009 Kazan	Pairs
Silver medal – second place	2010 Saint Petersburg	Pairs
Bronze medal – third place	2006 Kazan	Pairs
Winter Universiade
Bronze medal – third place	2005 Innsbruck	Pairs
World Junior Championships
Gold medal – first place	2005 Kitchener	Pairs
Bronze medal – third place	2004 The Hague	Pairs
Junior Grand Prix Final
Gold medal – first place	2004–05 Helsinki	Pairs
Bronze medal – third place	2003–04 Malmö	Pairs
Representing Russia (with Lebedev)
Winter Universiade
Silver medal – second place	2003 Tarvisio	Pairs

Maria Vladimirovna Mukhortova (Russian: Мария Владимировна Мухортова; born 20 November 1985) is a Russian pair skater. With former partner Maxim Trankov, she is the 2008 European silver medalist, a five-time Grand Prix medalist (including one gold medal at Trophée Eric Bompard), 2005 World Junior champion, 2004 Junior Grand Prix Final champion, and 2007 Russian national champion. In her early career, she competed with Egor Golovkin and Pavel Lebedev. She also competed one season with Jérôme Blanchard.

== Personal life ==
Mukhortova was born in Saint Petersburg but began skating in her father's hometown of Lipetsk when she was 6 years old. She became attracted to pair skating, however, there were no related opportunities in Lipetsk so her mother took her back to Saint Petersburg when she was thirteen.

== Career ==
=== Early career ===
Mukhortova and Maxim Trankov trained in the same practice group under coaches Ludmila Velikova and Nikolai Velikov, but with different partners. Mukhortova first competed with Pavel Lebedev during the 2001–02 and the 2002–03 season, skating with him on the ISU Junior Grand Prix and finishing fourth at the 2002 and 2003 World Junior Championships. The pair had frequent arguments but due to good results, Mukhortova initially declined to switch partners, however, a year later in 2003, she accepted Trankov's suggestion to skate together.

=== Partnership with Trankov ===
In their first season together, they won the bronze medal at the Junior Grand Prix Final and the 2004 World Junior Championships. The following season, they competed on both the Grand Prix and Junior Grand Prix and won the 2005 World Junior Championships. In the 2005–06 Olympic season, they were assigned to the 2006 World Championships after Tatiana Totmianina / Maxim Marinin withdrew. They placed 12th in their debut at the event.

After the 2005–06 season, Mukhortova and Trankov switched coaches to Tamara Moskvina. In August 2006, Artur Dmitriev became their coach and in December 2006 they moved to Oleg Vasiliev.

In the 2006–07 season, Mukhortova and Trankov won the 2007 Russian Nationals, but were forced to miss the Europeans after she suffered an injury in practice. They returned in time for the 2007 Worlds, moving up one place to 11th. The following season, they won the silver medal at the 2008 Europeans and finished 7th at the 2008 Worlds. They had to take a short break in the middle of their long program at Worlds because Trankov was suffering from swelling in his arm, but returned to complete their skate after some alterations to his costume.

In the 2008-09 season, Mukhortova and Trankov qualified for their first Grand Prix Final, won a bronze medal at the 2009 European Championships, and moved up to 5th place at the World Championships.

For the 2009-10 season, the pair was assigned to the 2009 Trophée Eric Bompard, where they set a new overall personal best score and defeated two-time world champions Aliona Savchenko & Robin Szolkowy. Their second Grand Prix event was the 2009 Skate Canada where they placed second. They won another bronze medal at the 2010 European Championships but finished a disappointing seventh at the 2010 Winter Olympic Games. At the 2010 World Championships held in Turin, Italy, in March 2010 they finished in 4th place. Shortly thereafter, the pair ended their partnership.

=== Partnership with Blanchard ===
In May 2010, it was announced that she had teamed up with Jérôme Blanchard to compete for Russia. At the 2011 Russian Championships, they finished 7th overall. In February 2011, their coach Oleg Vasiliev said they had taken some time off due to funding issues. On March 4, Vasiliev confirmed their partnership had ended; Mukhortova would consider competing with a new partner or move into show skating. Mukhortova joined the Russian Ice Stars in 2011.

== Programs ==
=== With Blanchard ===
Season	Short program	Free skating
2010–11	Song from a Secret Garden by Secret Garden	The Nutcracker by Pyotr Tchaikovsky

=== With Trankov ===
Season	Short program	Free skating	Exhibition
2009–10	Appassionata by Secret Garden	Love Story by Francis Lai; Cinema Paradiso by Ennio Morricone and Andrea Morricone	Une Vie d'Amour sung by Mireille Mathieu and Charles Aznavour
2008–09	Nobody Home by Pink Floyd performed by London Symphonic Orchestra	The Lady and the Hooligan by Dmitri Shostakovich	Соглашайся хотя бы на рай в шалаше by Diana Arbenina
2007–08	Otonal by Raúl Di Blasio	Prelude in C sharp minor by Sergei Rachmaninov	Adagio by Secret Garden
2006–07	Music for Cinema by Alfred Schnittke	Elegy by Sergei Rachmaninov	Tale of Wandering by Alfred Schnittke
2005–06	Baxter (soundtrack)	Rhapsody on a Theme of Paganini by Sergei Rachmaninov	Russian: Дождик осенний from The Turkish Gambit (film) by Olga Krasko
2004–05	Quidam from Cirque du Soleil by René Dupéré	El dia que me quieras by Raúl Di Blasio	Russian: Дождик осенний from The Turkish Gambit (film) by Olga Krasko
2003–04	Melodies of the White Night soundtrack by Isaac Schwartz	El dia que me quieras by Raúl Di Blasio	Buddha Bar; Safri Duo

=== With Lebedev ===
Season	Short program	Free skating
2002–03	Gospodin Oformitel	Lawrence of Arabia by Maurice Jarre
2001–02	The Matrix by various artists	Lord of the Dance by Ronan Hardiman; Secret Garden; Lord of the Dance by Ronan Hardiman

== Results ==
=== With Blanchard ===
Event	2010–11
Russian Championships	7th

=== With Trankov ===
Results
International
Event	2003–04	2004–05	2005–06	2006–07	2007–08	2008–09	2009–10
Olympics							7th
Worlds			12th	11th	7th	5th	4th
Europeans					2nd	3rd	3rd
Grand Prix Final						6th	4th
GP Bompard					3rd	2nd	1st
GP Cup of Russia		6th	4th	7th	4th		
GP Skate America				5th		3rd	
GP Skate Canada			7th				2nd
Finlandia					1st		
Nebelhorn						2nd	
Universiade		3rd					
International: Junior
Junior Worlds	3rd	1st					
JGP Final	3rd	1st					
JGP China		1st					
JGP Czech	1st						
JGP Germany		1st					
JGP Poland	1st						
National
Russian Champ.	1st J.	WD	3rd	1st	2nd	2nd	2nd

=== With Lebedev ===
Results
International
Event	2001–02	2002–03
Universiade		2nd
International: Junior
Junior Worlds	4th	4th
JGP Final	8th	8th
JGP Czech	1st	
JGP Germany		2nd
JGP Serbia		1st
JGP Sweden	3rd	
National
Russian Champ.		5th
Russian Jr. Champ.	3rd	3rd
