= Pavel Lebedev =

Russian pair skater

Personal information
- Full name: Pavel Andreyevich Lebedev
- Born: 12 December 1982 (age 43) Leningrad, Russian SFSR, Soviet Union
- Height: 1.78 m (5 ft 10 in)

Figure skating career
- Country: Russia
Medal record
Figure skating: Pairs
Representing Russia (with Shestakova)
World Junior Championships
Gold medal – first place	2004 The Hague	Pairs
Junior Grand Prix Final
Silver medal – second place	2003–04 Malmö	Pairs
Representing Russia (with Mukhortova)
Winter Universiade
Silver medal – second place	2003 Tarvisio	Pairs

Pavel Andreyevich Lebedev (Russian: Павел Андреевич Лебедев; born 12 December 1982) is a Russian former pair skater. With Natalia Shestakova, he is the 2004 World Junior Champion. Earlier, he competed with Maria Mukhortova and Svetlana Nikolaeva.

== Programs ==
=== With Shestakova ===
Season	Short program	Free skating
2005–2006	The Nutcracker by Pyotr Tchaikovsky	Piano Concerto by Camille Saint-Saëns
2004–2005	Arabic Mix by V. Selvaganesh	Xotica (from Cirque du Soleil) by René Dupéré
2003–2004	The Seventh Bullet	The Matrix by Rob Dougan

=== With Mukhortova ===
Season	Short program	Free skating
2002–2003	Gospodin Oformitel	Lawrence of Arabia by Maurice Jarre
2001–2002	The Matrix by various artists	Lord of the Dance by Ronan Hardiman; Secret Garden; Lord of the Dance by Ronan Hardiman

=== With Nikolaeva ===
Season	Short program	Free skating
2000–2001	Diva by Jean Michel Jarre; The 5th Element by Eric Serra	Lord of the Dance by Ronan Hardiman; Nocturne; Adagio by Secret Garden

== Competitive highlights ==
=== With Shestakova ===
Results
International
Event	2003–2004	2004–2005	2005–2006
GP Bompard			5th
GP Cup of China			5th
GP Cup of Russia		9th	
GP NHK Trophy		6th	
International: Junior
Junior Worlds	1st		
JGP Final	2nd		
JGP Bulgaria	1st		
JGP Slovenia	2nd		
National
Russian Champ.	5th	5th	4th
Russian Jr. Champ.	2nd		
GP = Grand Prix; JGP = Junior Grand Prix

=== With Mukhortova ===
Results
International
Event	2001–02	2002–03
Universiade		2nd
International: Junior
Junior Worlds	4th	4th
JGP Final	8th	8th
JGP Czech	1st	
JGP Germany		2nd
JGP Serbia		1st
JGP Sweden	3rd	
National
Russian Champ.		5th
Russian Jr. Champ.	3rd	3rd
J. = Junior level; JGP = Junior Grand Prix

=== With Nikolaeva ===
Results
International: Junior
Event	1999–2000	2000–2001
Junior Worlds		7th
JGP Final		4th
JGP France		2nd
JGP Germany		2nd
National
Russian Jr. Champ.	5th	3rd
JGP = Junior Grand Prix
