= Lauren Senft =

Canadian retired ice dancer (born 1987)

Personal information
- Born: May 16, 1987 (age 39) in North Vancouver, British Columbia, Canada

Figure skating career
- Country: Canada
- Skating club: Hollyburn Country Club
- Retired: May 9, 2008

Lauren Senft (born May 16, 1987) is a Canadian retired ice dancer.

She competed on the junior level with Andrew Hallam before teaming up with Leif Gislason in 2002. The two are the 2004 Canadian junior national silver medalists. Senft and Gislason split after the 2007 Four Continents Championships. Senft then teamed up with American Augie Hill and competed with him during the 2007 and 2008 season. Senft announced her retirement from competitive skating on May 9, 2008.

== Competitive highlights ==
=== With Hill ===
Event	2007-2008
Canadian Championships	8th

=== With Gislason ===
Event	2003-2004	2004-2005	2005-2006	2006-2007
Four Continents Championships		5th		6th
World Junior Championships	8th			
Canadian Championships	2nd J.	5th	6th	4th
NHK Trophy				8th
Cup of China				7th
Skate America			8th	
Junior Grand Prix, Ukraine		5th		
Junior Grand Prix, Japan	3rd			
Junior Grand Prix, Mexico	4th			

- J = Junior level

== Programs ==
(with Gislason)

Season	Original dance	Free dance
2006–2007	La Cumparsita	Anytime, Anywhere by Sarah Brightman
2005–2006	Rhumba: Besame Mucho performed by Chris Isaak; Merengue: Tu Sonrisa performed by Elvis Crespo	Volver Tango by Maxime Rodriguez
2004–2005	Slow Foxtrot: As Times Goes By; Quickstep	Atylantos by Jean-Patrick Capdevielle
2003–2004	Swing; Boogie Woogie Bugle Boy by Andrews Sisters	Summer Storm by Antonio Vivaldi performed by J. Kawai
