= Bryce Davison =

American-Canadian pair skater

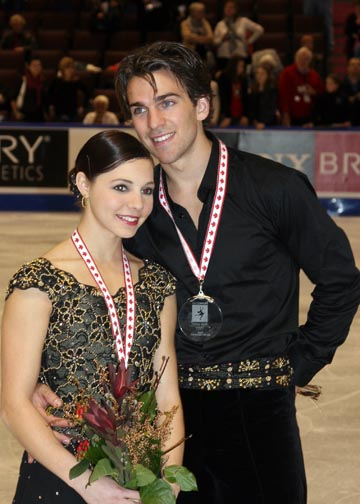
- Dubé and Davison at 2008 Skate Canada

Personal information
- Born: January 29, 1986 (age 40) Walnut Creek, California
- Home town: Huntsville, Ontario
- Height: 1.77 m (5 ft 10 in)

Figure skating career
- Country: Canada
- Coach: Annie Barabé; Sophie Richard; David Pelletier
- Skating club: Hamilton SC
- Began skating: 1990
- Retired: 2011

Medal record
Event	Gold medal – first place	Silver medal – second place	Bronze medal – third place
World Championships	0	0	1
Four Continents Championships	0	1	0
Canadian Championships	3	2	0
World Team Trophy	0	1	0
World Junior Championships	0	2	0
Junior Grand Prix Final	1	0	0
Medal list
World Championships
Bronze medal – third place	2008 Gothenburg	Pairs
Four Continents Championships
Silver medal – second place	2009 Vancouver	Pairs
Canadian Championships
Gold medal – first place	2007 Halifax	Pairs
Gold medal – first place	2009 Saskatoon	Pairs
Gold medal – first place	2010 London	Pairs
Silver medal – second place	2006 Ottawa	Pairs
Silver medal – second place	2008 Vancouver	Pairs
World Team Trophy
Silver medal – second place	2009 Tokyo	Team
World Junior Championships
Silver medal – second place	2004 The Hague	Pairs
Silver medal – second place	2005 Kitchener	Pairs
Junior Grand Prix Final
Gold medal – first place	2003–04 Malmö	Pairs

Bryce Davison (born January 29, 1986) is an American-Canadian former competitive pair skater. With former partner Jessica Dubé, he is a three-time (2007, 2009, 2010) Canadian national champion, the 2008 World bronze medalist and the 2009 Four Continents silver medalist.

They represented Canada at the 2006 and 2010 Winter Olympics.

== Career ==
Davison began skating at age three. He competed with Jessie McNeil at the pre-novice and juvenile levels. They were the 2000 Canadian Juvenile national champions. He later competed with Claire Daugulis on the novice and junior levels.

Davison teamed up with Jessica Dubé in July 2003. The two had a successful junior career before moving up to the senior level in 2005–06. They placed 10th at the 2006 Winter Olympic Games and 7th at the World Championships that same season.

In the summer of 2006, Dubé suffered an injury in practice and was removed from the ice on a backboard; she had knee surgery in September. They won their first national crown in Nova Scotia at the 2007 Canadian Championships. After an on-ice accident at the 2007 Four Continents (see below), they made a comeback a month later at the World Championships, where they again finished seventh.

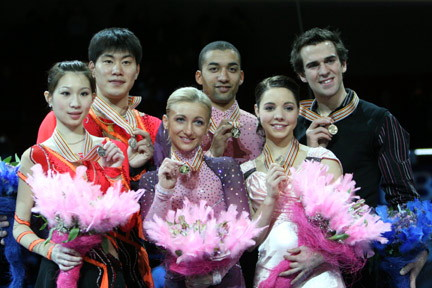
Dubé and Davison on the podium at 2008 Worlds

Dube and Davison had a breakthrough season in 2007–08. They won their first Grand Prix medals, including a gold at 2007 Skate America. They lost the national title to Anabelle Langlois and Cody Hay at the 2008 Canadian Championships, but two months later at the World Championships, they won the bronze medal after finishing second in the long program; they set personal best scores in each segment of the event and overall.

The next two seasons did not prove as successful, and while they regained and then defended their national title, the pair were unable to repeat their success at the World Championships. Their top placement during this time was a second-place finish at the 2009 Four Continents Championships. Dube and Davison were part of Team Canada at the inaugural World Team Trophy in April 2009. In the 2009–10 Olympic season, they medalled at both Grand Prix events but did not qualify for the Grand Prix final. They were sixth at the Olympics and at Worlds.

Davison has osteochondritis dissecans, which led to his sustaining a serious knee injury in practice in October 2010, forcing the pair to withdraw from the 2010 Skate Canada International. He underwent season-ending surgery to reattach a broken piece of bone. The recovery period was estimated at 18 months.

Dubé and Davison announced the end of their partnership on March 10, 2011. He had felt they needed to make changes but Dubé was unwilling and suggested parting ways. Davison left open the possibility that he might continue skating if he finds the right partner. In July, it was reported that Davison had completed his Level I Coaching Certification and would begin coaching young skaters in Hamilton, Ontario. At the time, Davison said he might compete again, but in December 2011, he confirmed that he had retired from competition. He is the director of skater development at the Hamilton Skating Club.

Davison competed in singles until 2007. He is a member of the Hamilton Skating Club in Hamilton, Ontario.

== Accidents ==
On February 8, 2007, Dubé was struck in the face by the blade of Davison's skate during the free skate segment at the Four Continents Championships in Colorado Springs. The pair were on their third rotation of a side-by-side camel spin, in which one leg is horizontal during the spin, when Davison's spin began to travel towards Dubé, causing his skate blade to contact her face. She immediately fell to the ice and clutched at her face as blood pooled on the ice. Davison comforted her as the medical staff put her on a stretcher and took her to Memorial Hospital. She underwent surgery that night, receiving 83 stitches to repair a laceration on her left cheek and nose. Her eye was not affected and nothing was broken. Both skaters were later treated for post-traumatic stress disorder, but by March 2007 they had returned to competition together.

In April 2009, at the gala exhibition of the 2009 World Team Trophy in Tokyo, Dubé accidentally struck Davison on the head during a triple twist; he was unable to catch her and she crashed to the ice, hitting her head. Dubé and Davison were hospitalized as a precautionary measure, but neither was seriously injured.

== Personal life ==
Davison has dual American and Canadian citizenship. In addition to figure skating, he also played hockey until age 15. He formerly dated his partner Dubé. Davison studied human anatomy and physiology through Athabasca University online courses. He married retired Canadian synchronized skater Michele Moore Davison on September 9, 2017. The couple have two children together.

== Programs ==
(With Dubé)

Season	Short program	Free skating	Exhibition
2009–2010	Requiem For a Dream by Clint Mansell	The Way We Were by Marvin Hamlisch	Fix You by Coldplay
2008–2009	Fix You by Coldplay	Carmen by Georges Bizet	On fire by Switchfoot
2006–2008	Galicia Flamenca by Gino D'Auri	The Blower's Daughter by Damien Rice	
2005–2006	Hasta Que Te Conocí by Raúl Di Blasio	Piano Concerto No.7 by George Gershwin	Endless Love by Lionel Richie, Diana Ross
2004–2005	Hasta Que Te Conocí by Raúl Di Blasio	Romeo and Juliet (1968 film) by Nino Rota, André Rieu; Dance of the Knights by Sergei Prokofiev	My Immortal by Evanescence
2003–2004	Whose Woods These Are by David Tolk	Romeo and Juliet by Sergei Prokofiev	

== Competitive highlights ==
=== Pairs career with Dubé ===
Results
International
Event	2003–04	2004–05	2005–06	2006–07	2007–08	2008–09	2009–10
Olympics			10th				6th
Worlds			7th	7th	3rd	7th	6th
Four Continents				WD		2nd	
Grand Prix Final					4th		
GP Bompard							2nd
GP Cup of China			4th				
GP NHK Trophy					3rd	3rd	
GP Skate America			6th		1st		
GP Skate Canada					2nd	2nd	3rd
International: Junior
Junior Worlds	2nd	2nd					
JGP Final	1st	WD					
JGP China		2nd					
JGP Japan	1st						
JGP Mexico	1st						
JGP USA		1st					
National
Canadian Champ.	1st J.	WD	2nd	1st	2nd	1st	1st
GP = Grand Prix; JGP = Junior Grand Prix; J. = Junior level; WD = Withdrew

=== Pairs career with Daugulis ===
Event	2001–02	2002–03
Canadian Championships	5th N.	7th J.
Junior Grand Prix, USA		5th
N. = Novice level; J. = Junior level

=== Singles career ===
Event	2001–02	2002–03	2003–04	2004–05	2005–06	2006–07
Canadian Championships	14th N.	3rd N.	10th J.	6th J.	15th	15th
N. = Novice level; J. = Junior level
