= Kateryna Proyda =

Ukrainian figure skater

Kateryna Proida
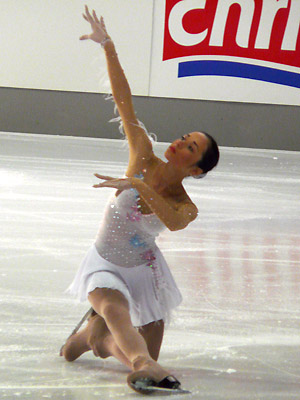
- Proida in 2007

Personal information
- Native name: Катерина Пройда
- Other names: Ekaterina Proida
- Born: 3 August 1989 (age 36) Dnipropetrovsk, Ukrainian SSR
- Height: 1.66 m (5 ft 5 1/2 in)

Figure skating career
- Country: Ukraine
- Began skating: 1993
- Retired: 2010

Kateryna (Ekaterina) Proida (Ukrainian: Катерина Пройда, born 3 August 1989 in Dnipropetrovsk) is a Ukrainian former competitive figure skater. She competed at four ISU Championships, qualifying to the free skate at the 2005 World Junior Championships and 2006 European Championships.

== Programs ==
Season	Short program	Free skating
2009–10	Boléro by Maurice Ravel	
2007–08	Domingo en Sevilla	Swan Lake by Pyotr Tchaikovsky
2005–06	For Love One Can Die by Ennio Morricone	Gioco Italiano by V. Bassani, J. S. Bach; Sogno Italiano by V. Bassani, V. Cerruti; Gioco Italiano by V. Bassani, J. S. Bach
2004–05	Pacifico by Armik	Jazz performed by Richard Clayderman
2003–04	Libertango by Astor Piazzolla	Korambletta by T Cottran; Anette by H. Panks

== Competitive highlights ==
JGP: Junior Grand Prix

International
Event	01–02	02–03	03–04	04–05	05–06	07–08	08–09	09–10
Europeans					22nd	29th		
Crystal Skate								15th
Nebelhorn Trophy						22nd		
Universiade							25th	
International: Junior
Junior Worlds			26th	17th				
JGP Belarus							11th	
JGP Czech Rep.							12th	
JGP Estonia					14th			
JGP Hungary				20th				
JGP Poland			8th		13th			
JGP Slovenia			17th					
JGP Ukraine				12th				
EYOF				3rd				
National
Ukrainian	6th J	1st J		1st J		2nd		5th
J: Junior level
