= Lina Johansson =

Swedish figure skater (born 1988)

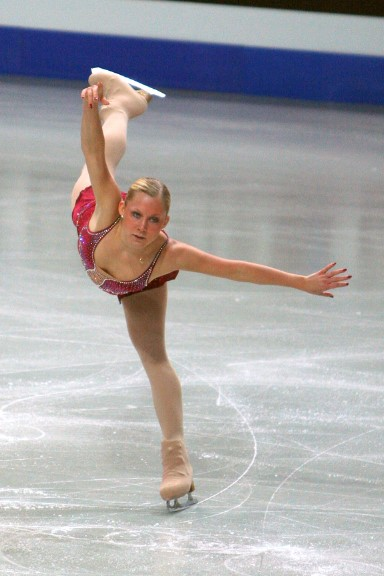
- Lina Johansson in 2007

Personal information
- Born: 26 September 1988 (age 38)
- Height: 1.54 m (5 ft 1/2 in)

Figure skating career
- Country: Sweden
- Coach: Elsa Magnusson
- Skating club: Malmö Konståkningsklubb
- Began skating: 1994
- Retired: 2007
Medal record
Figure skating: Ladies' singles
Representing Sweden
Junior Grand Prix Final
| Silver medal – second place | 2003–04 Malmö | Ladies' singles |

Lina Johansson (born 26 September 1988) is a Swedish former competitive figure skater. She is the 2003–04 JGP Final silver medalist, a two-time Nordic medalist, and the 2005 Swedish national champion. She reached the free skate at six ISU Championships – 2003 Junior Worlds in Ostrava, 2004 Junior Worlds in The Hague, 2005 Europeans in Turin, 2005 Worlds in Moscow, 2006 Europeans in Lyon, and 2007 Europeans in Warsaw.

She is the first Swedish skater to qualify for and to medal at the JGP Final. Due to many injuries during her career, she retired from competitive skating in 2007.

== Programs ==
| Season | Short program | Free skating | Exhibition |
|---|---|---|---|
| 2006–2007 | Lord of the Dance by Ronan Hardiman | Violin Fantasy on Puccini's Turandot by Vanessa-Mae | |
| 2005–2006 | For Your Eyes by Armik | Brahms in Rain by Tytos Wojnowicz | |
| 2004–2005 | Romeo and Juliet by Nino Rota | Otonal by Raúl Di Blasio | Rock the DJ by Robbie Williams |
| 2003–2004 | Le Professionnel by Ennio Morricone | Introduction and Rondo Capriccioso by Camille Saint-Saëns performed by the Royal Philharmonic Orchestra | |
| 2002–2003 | Time to Say Goodbye by Sartori / Quarantotto performed by Richard Clayderman | Introduction and Rondo Capriccioso by Camille Saint-Saëns performed by Symphonic Orchestra Montreal | |

== Competitive highlights ==
GP: Grand Prix; JGP: Junior Grand Prix

International
| Event | 2002–03 | 2003–04 | 2004–05 | 2005–06 | 2006–07 |
|---|---|---|---|---|---|
| Worlds | | | 19th | | 26th |
| Europeans | | | 17th | 24th | 14th |
| GP Skate Canada | | | 9th | | |
| Finlandia Trophy | | | 7th | | |
| Golden Spin | | 4th | | | 4th |
| Karl Schäfer | | | | | 6th |
| Nebelhorn Trophy | | | WD | | 5th |
| Nordics | | | 2nd | | 3rd |
International: Junior
| Junior Worlds | 8th | 7th | | | |
| JGP Final | 6th | 2nd | | | |
| JGP Bulgaria | | 1st | | | |
| JGP Germany | 4th | | | | |
| JGP Slovakia | 1st | | | | |
| JGP Slovenia | | 2nd | | | |
National
| Swedish Champ. | 1st J. | | 1st | | 2nd |
J. = Junior level; WD = Withdrew
