= Kiira Korpi =

Finnish figure skater (born 1988)

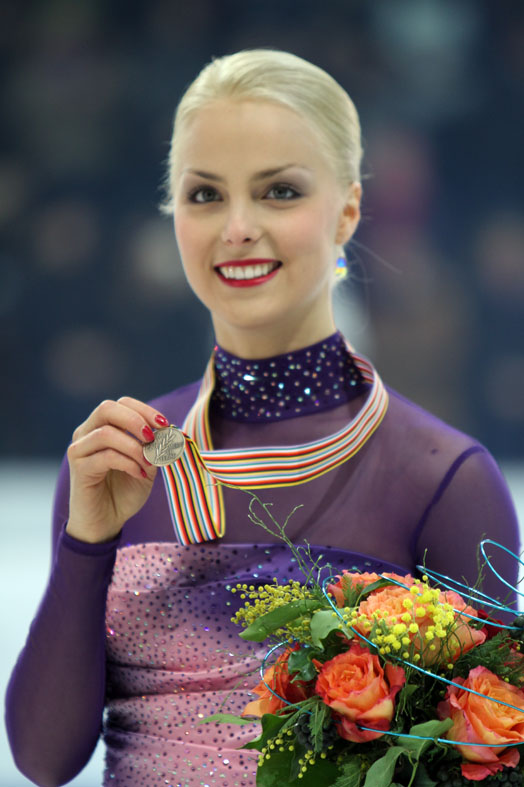
- Korpi in 2011

Personal information
- Full name: Kiira Linda Katriina Korpi
- Born: 26 September 1988 (age 37) Tampere, Finland
- Height: 1.69 m (5 ft 6½ in)

Figure skating career
- Country: Finland
- Coach: Carlos Avila de Borba, Rafael Arutyunyan, Vera Arutyunyan, Nadia Kanaeva, Maaret Siromaa, Susanna Haarala
- Skating club: Tappara FSC
- Began skating: 1993
- Retired: 27 August 2015
Medal record
Representing Finland
Figure skating: Ladies' singles
European Championships
Silver medal – second place	2012 Sheffield	Ladies' singles
Bronze medal – third place	2007 Warsaw	Ladies' singles
Bronze medal – third place	2011 Bern	Ladies' singles

Kiira Linda Katriina Korpi (Finnish pronunciation: [ˈkiːrɑ ˈkorpi]; born 26 September 1988) is a Finnish figure skater. She (Note: Korpi uses both she/her and they/them pronouns. This article uses she/her pronouns for consistency.) is a three-time European medalist (bronze in 2007 and 2011, silver in 2012), the 2010 Trophée Eric Bompard champion, the 2012 Rostelecom Cup champion, a two-time Cup of China medalist, and a five-time Finnish national champion (2009, 2011–2013, 2015). She retired from competitive skating in August 2015.

== Personal life ==
Korpi was born in Tampere, Finland. Her father, Rauno Korpi, coached the Finnish women's hockey team to a bronze medal at the 1998 Winter Olympics. In Finland her nickname is Jääprinsessa (Ice Princess) due to her resemblance to Grace Kelly, the former Princess of Monaco.

In addition to her native Finnish, Korpi also speaks Swedish, English, and German. She has practiced pilates and Ashtanga yoga. In 2009, she had a brief relationship with a Russian oligarch and billionaire, who gave her numerous luxurious gifts, including a €300,000 Audi R8. She became engaged to Arthur Borges Seppälä in May 2017 and they were married three years, until June 2021. She lived in Milan, Italy, after she retired from competitive skating, and in 2016, she moved to New York City, U.S.

In March 2023, in an interview with Apu Magazine, Kiira announced that she does not identify as heterosexual and that she likes women. On June 1, 2023, Korpi came out as a member of the LGBT community via Instagram, stating that she could "totally see [herself] falling in love with a person regardless of their gender".

== Career ==
=== Early career ===
Korpi began skating at the age of five, following her older sister. She landed her first triple jump, a salchow, when she was 11 or 12.

In 2003, Korpi finished 19th in her first appearance at the World Junior Championships. The following season, making her ISU Junior Grand Prix (JGP) debut, she placed 6th in Slovenia and took the bronze medal in Poland. She ranked 16th at the 2004 World Junior Championships.

=== 2004–2005 season ===
Returning to the JGP series, Korpi placed 6th in Hungary before winning gold in Germany. She received a host wildcard spot at the JGP Final, where she finished fourth. She was awarded the silver medal at the 2005 Finnish Championships and was assigned to the 2005 European Championships, where she placed 13th. She then competed at the 2005 World Junior Championships, where she came in tenth, her best finish at the event.

=== 2005–2006 season ===
Competing in the JGP series, Korpi placed 7th in Slovakia and won the bronze medal in Estonia. After taking the bronze medal at the 2006 Finnish Championships, she was assigned to the 2006 European Championships, which the Finnish skating federation had decided to use to determine the Olympic team. Korpi's European result, 6th, allowed her to compete at the 2006 Winter Olympics in Turin, where she finished 16th.

=== 2006–2007 season ===
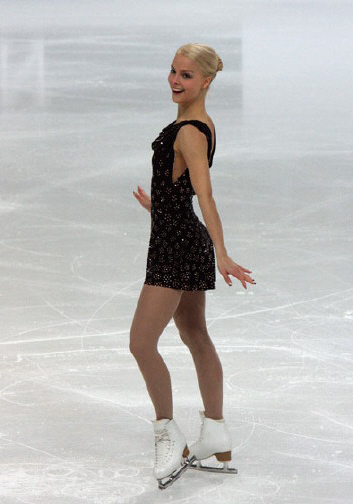
Korpi at the 2009 Europeans

In the 2006–07 season, Korpi made her senior Grand Prix debut. She placed 4th at the 2007 Finnish Nationals, then went to the 2007 European Championships and won the bronze medal, making her the second Finnish ladies' singles skater to ever win a European medal. She finished 14th at Worlds.

=== 2007–2008 season ===
Early in the 2007–08 season, Korpi suffered an esophagus infection, flu, and sinusitis, causing her to miss her first Grand Prix event. Korpi was 5th at the 2008 European Championships. At the 2008 Worlds, she was 4th after the short program but had a poor long program and ended up in ninth place.

=== 2008–2009 season ===
Korpi did not participate in the Grand Prix series. Later that season, she became the Finnish national champion, a title she had previously won on the junior level. She was again 5th at the European Championships and won the bronze medal at the 2009 Winter Universiade, her final event of the season.

=== 2009–2010 season ===
Korpi began her season with podium finishes at the Nebelhorn Trophy and the Finlandia Trophy, as well as her first senior Grand Prix medal, a silver at the Cup of China. She was unable to defend her national title, however, finishing second behind Laura Lepistö. At the European Championships, she was in second after the short program, but her performance in the long program kept her off the podium. Korpi was 11th at the 2010 Winter Olympics but only 19th a month later at the World Championships.

=== 2010–2011 season ===
Korpi decided to try new choreographers, and worked on her competitive programs with Shae-Lynn Bourne and David Wilson. She began the season at the 2010 Nebelhorn Trophy, which she won for the first time in her career. Her assigned Grand Prix events were the 2010 NHK Trophy and the 2010 Trophée Eric Bompard. She placed fourth at the NHK Trophy, then won her first Grand Prix title at the Trophée Eric Bompard. The combined results left her as the first alternate for the Grand Prix Final. Her next event was Finnish nationals, which she won for the second time in her career. Korpi won the bronze medal at the 2011 European Championships.

=== 2011–2012 season ===
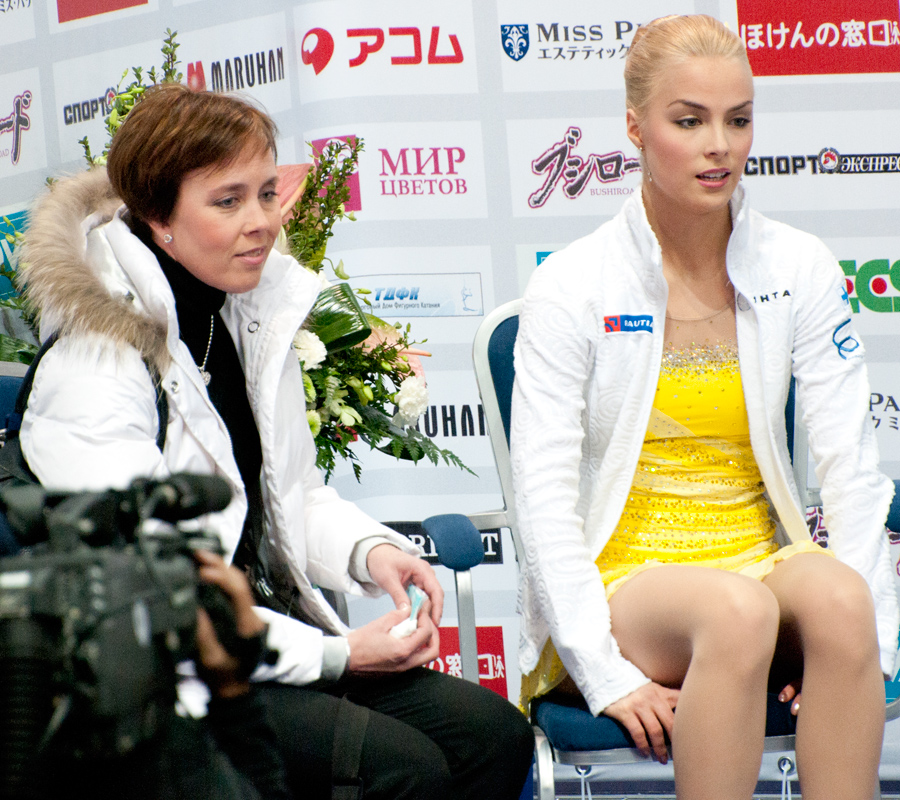
Korpi with coach Susanna Haarala in 2011

In July 2011, Korpi injured the metatarsus in her foot, resulting in her withdrawal from the 2011 Japan Open and 2011 Finlandia Trophy. She resumed practicing toe jumps in October and said they were going well but she did not feel they were completely ready for the 2011 NHK Trophy, where she finished 6th. She was fifth at the 2011 Cup of Russia. She successfully defended her national title at the 2012 Finnish Figure Skating Championships in December.

Korpi won her third medal at the Europeans, finishing second behind Carolina Kostner despite hurting her upper leg a few weeks before the championships. She withdrew from the 2012 World Championships two weeks prior to the event, citing lingering foot and hip injuries.

=== 2012–2013 season ===
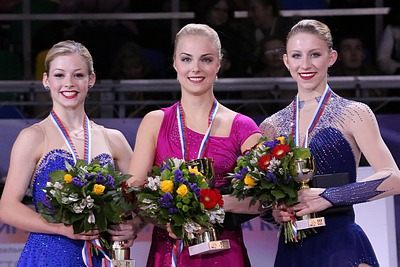
Korpi and the other medalists at the 2012 Rostelecom Cup

Korpi began her season at the 2012 Finlandia Trophy, where she won the silver medal. She then won her third Grand Prix medal, a bronze, at the 2012 Cup of China. At the 2012 Rostelecom Cup, Korpi won the second GP title of her career and qualified for her first Grand Prix Final. In doing so, she became the first Finnish figure skater to ever qualify for the final. She finished fourth at the event. Korpi's next event was the 2013 Finnish Nationals, where she took the gold medal. Korpi withdrew from the 2013 European Championships due to inflammation in her left Achilles tendon. She missed the 2013 World Championships for the same reason.

=== 2013–2014 season ===
On 23 August 2013, Korpi confirmed a coaching change to Rafael Arutyunyan in Lake Arrowhead, California. She was assigned to two Grand Prix events, the 2013 Skate Canada International and the 2013 Trophee Eric Bompard, but had to withdraw from both due to an Achilles tendon injury sustained in September. Carlos Avila de Borba became one of her coaches in December 2013. After an operation in April 2014 due to necrosis, she wore a cast for six weeks and resumed training in late June.

=== 2014–2015 season ===
Korpi made her return to competition at the 2014 CS Golden Spin of Zagreb after a two-year hiatus due to injuries. She finished 4th in the short but moved up in the free skate to win the event. She won her fifth national title in December. She competed at the 2015 European Championships in Stockholm, placing fourth in the short program. However, Korpi withdrew from the competition before the free skate citing illness. She placed 31st at the 2015 World Championships.

=== Later career ===
Korpi initially planned to compete in the 2015–2016 season. She was assigned to the 2015 Trophée Éric Bompard, but withdrew from the event. On 27 August 2015, she announced her retirement from competitive skating at a press conference in Helsinki. In a later interview, she stated that she had been struggling with anxiety. She also said, "Every time I started training, I got injured. I was mentally very empty. I took time for myself to think about what I need to do. I knew that I cannot continue competing."

Korpi has continued to perform in ice shows. She signed up to appear as an athlete ambassador and work for Finnish TV at the 2017 World Championships in Helsinki.

== Programs ==
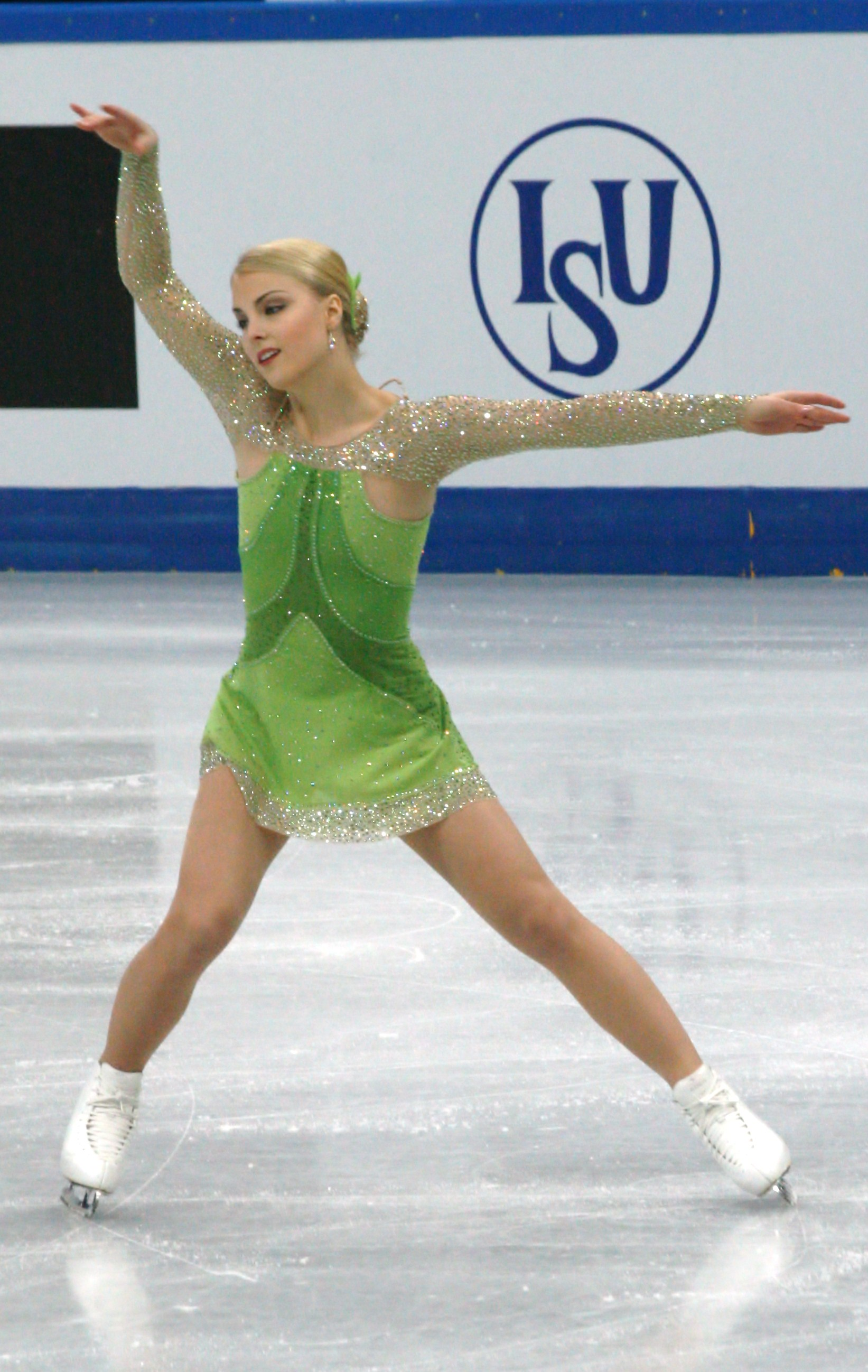
Korpi at the 2012 Grand Prix Final

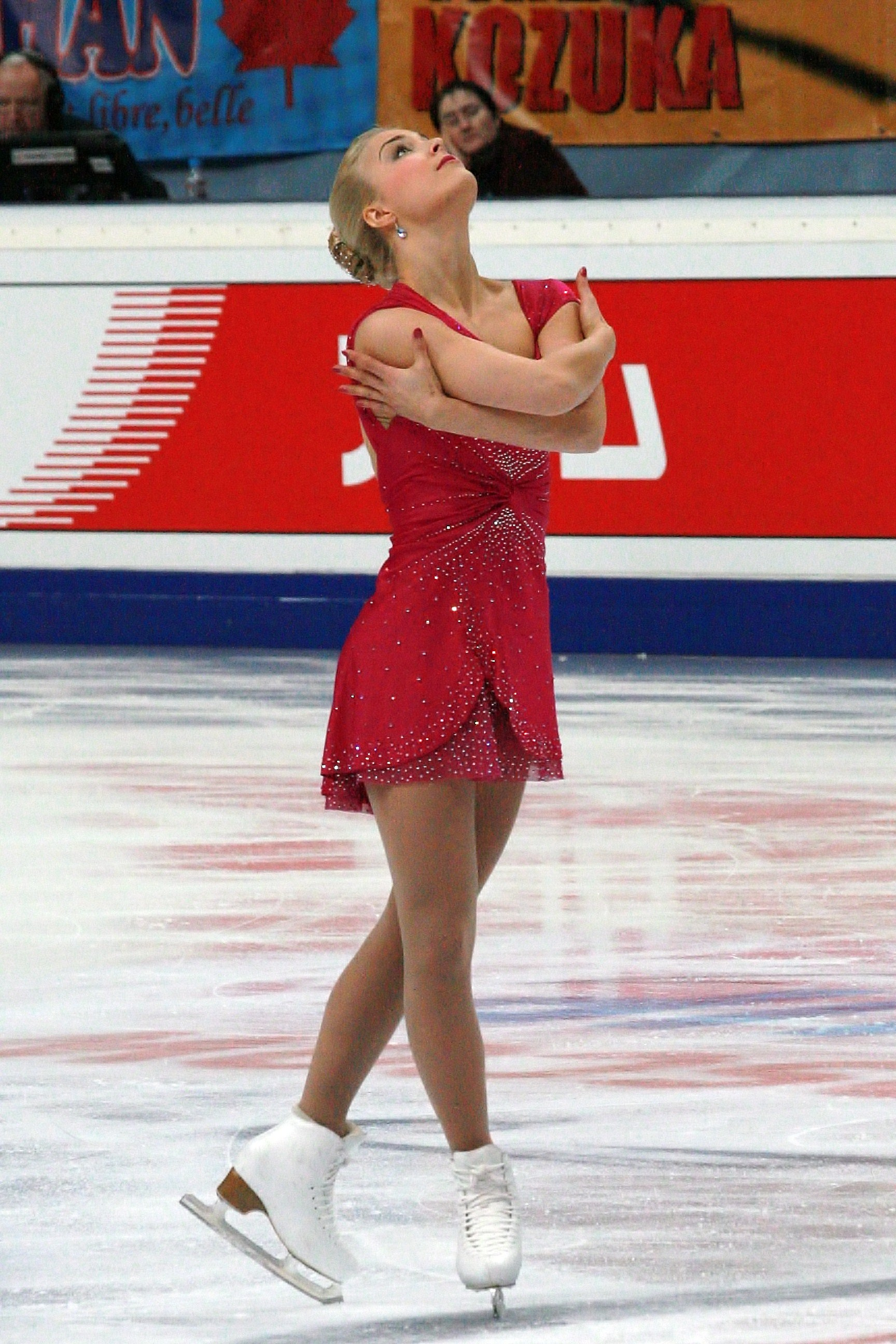
Korpi at the 2012 Rostelecom Cup

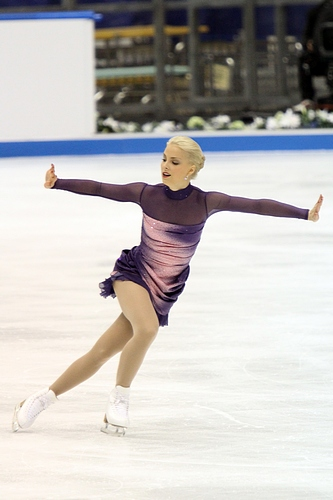
Korpi at the 2010 NHK Trophy

Season	Short program	Free skating	Exhibition
2014–2015	A Day in the Life by The Beatles covered by Jeff Beck choreo. by Jeffrey Buttle	Violin Concerto in D minor by Jean Sibelius choreo. by Shae-Lynn Bourne	
2013–2014	A Day in the Life by The Beatles covered by Jeff Beck choreo. by Jeffrey Buttle	Once Upon a Time in America by Ennio Morricone choreo. by Shae-Lynn Bourne	
2012–2013	The Girl with the Flaxen Hair by Claude Debussy choreo. by David Wilson	Once Upon a Time in America by Ennio Morricone choreo. by Shae-Lynn Bourne	Wide Awake by Katy Perry
2011–2012	Over the Rainbow by Harold Arlen choreo. by Shae-Lynn Bourne	I Got Rhythm by George Gershwin choreo. by Shae-Lynn Bourne	You and I by Lady Gaga choreo. by David Wilson
2010–2011	Over the Rainbow by Harold Arlen choreo. by Shae-Lynn Bourne	Evita by Andrew Lloyd Webber choreo. by David Wilson	If I Were a Boy by Beyoncé choreo. by Marwin Smith, Salome Brunner; Cry Me a River by Ella Fitzgerald
2009–2010	Caravan by Ikuko Kawai	Crooked Room; Passenger to Copenhagen (from Agatha) by Kerkko Koskinen	If I Were a Boy by Beyoncé choreo. by Marwin Smith, Salome Brunner; Butterfly (from Out of Bounds) by Rajaton
2008–2009	Triunfal by Astor Piazzolla	Crooked Room; Passenger to Copenhagen (from Agatha) by Kerkko Koskinen	Butterfly (from Out of Bounds) by Rajaton
2007–2008	Triunfal by Astor Piazzolla	Phantasia by Andrew Lloyd Webber, Sarah Chang	ABBA medley: Gimme! Gimme! Gimme!; The Winner Takes It All; Dancing Queen
2006–2007	Eye Patch; Yo Te Quiero (from Once Upon a Time in Mexico) by Robert Rodriguez	Phantasia by Andrew Lloyd Webber, Sarah Chang	Speaking of Happiness by Gloria Lynne; S'il suffisait d'aimer by Celine Dion
2005–2006	Hello by Lionel Richie	Blues: Fever by Elvis Presley; Blues Boys Tune; Shake It Up and Go by B. B. King	
2004–2005	Nessun dorma by Giacomo Puccini performed by Vanessa-Mae	Blues: Fever by Elvis Presley; Blues Boys Tune; Shake It Up and Go by B. B. King	It's Oh So Quiet by Björk
2003–2004	Nessun dorma by Giacomo Puccini performed by Vanessa-Mae	It's Oh So Quiet by Björk	
2002–2003	Fantasie Impromptu by Frédéric Chopin	Spanish Caravan by The Doors	

== Competitive highlights ==
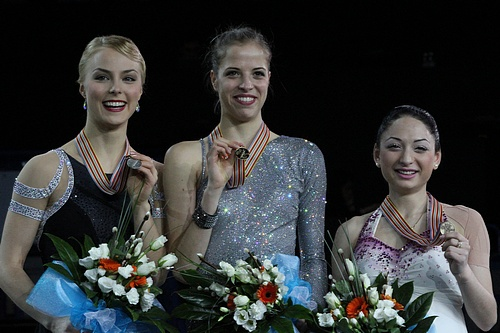
Korpi and her fellow medalists at the 2012 Europeans

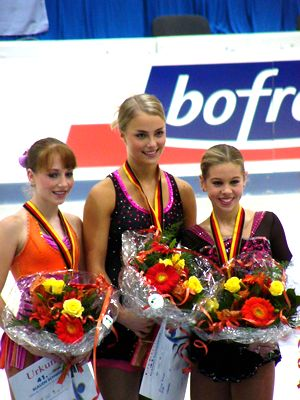
The ladies' podium at the 2004 Junior Grand Prix in Germany

GP: Grand Prix; CS: Challenger Series; JGP: Junior Grand Prix

International
Event	02–03	03–04	04–05	05–06	06–07	07–08	08–09	09–10	10–11	11–12	12–13	13–14	14–15
Olympics				16th				11th					
Worlds				10th	14th	9th		19th	9th				31st
Europeans			13th	6th	3rd	5th	5th	4th	3rd	2nd			WD
GP Final											4th		
GP Bompard								8th	1st			WD	
GP Cup of China								2nd			3rd		
GP NHK Trophy									4th	6th			
GP Rostelecom					6th	4th				5th	1st		
GP Skate America					7th								
GP Skate Canada												WD	
CS Golden Spin													1st
Finlandia Trophy					1st	5th		3rd	2nd		2nd		
Golden Spin						2nd							
Merano Cup				1st									
Nebelhorn Trophy								2nd	1st				
NRW Trophy								5th					
Universiade							3rd						
International: Junior
Junior Worlds	19th	16th	10th										
JGP Final			4th										
JGP Estonia				3rd									
JGP Germany			1st										
JGP Hungary			6th										
JGP Poland		3rd											
JGP Slovakia				7th									
JGP Slovenia		6th											
Golden Bear	5th J												
Nordics		1st J											
National
Finnish Champ.	2nd J	1st J	2nd	3rd	4th	2nd	1st	2nd	1st	1st	1st		1st
Team events
Japan Open						2nd T 6th P							

== Detailed results ==
2014–15 season
Date	Event	SP	FS	Total
March 23–29, 2015	2015 World Championships	31; 41.11		
Jan. 26 – Feb. 1, 2015	2015 European Championships	4; 60.60	WD	WD
December 19–21, 2014	2015 Finnish Championships	1; 55.31	1; 112.69	1; 168.00
December 4–6, 2014	2014 CS Golden Spin of Zagreb	4; 56.22	1; 111.59	1; 167.81
2012–13 season
December 14–16, 2012	2013 Finnish Championships	1; 66.39	1; 103.66	1; 170.05
December 6–9, 2012	2012–13 Grand Prix Final	4; 63.42	5; 111.52	4; 174.94
November 8–11, 2012	2012 Rostelecom Cup	2; 61.55	1; 115.64	1; 177.19
November 2–4, 2012	2012 Cup of China	4; 59.69	3; 110.17	3; 169.86
October 4–7, 2012	2012 Finlandia Trophy	1; 69.27	2; 111.89	2; 181.16
2011–12 season
January 23–29, 2012	2012 European Championships	2; 61.80	4; 105.14	2; 166.94
December 16–18, 2011	2012 Finnish Championships	1; 58.70	1; 112.28	1; 170.98
