= Jessica Dubé =

Canadian figure skater

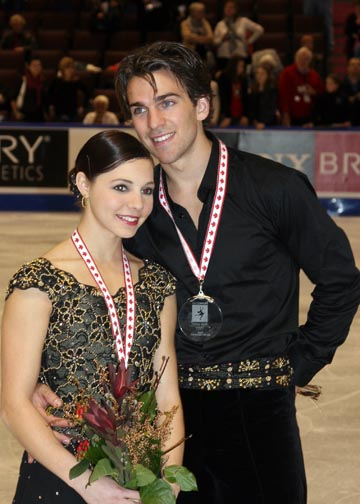
- Dubé and Davison at 2008 Skate Canada International

Personal information
- Born: October 29, 1987 (age 38) Drummondville, Quebec, Canada
- Home town: Varennes, Quebec, Canada
- Height: 1.58 m (5 ft 2 in)

Figure skating career
- Country: Canada
- Skating club: Drummondville CPA
- Began skating: 1991
- Retired: January 9, 2013

Medal record
Event	Gold medal – first place	Silver medal – second place	Bronze medal – third place
World Championships	0	0	1
Four Continents Championships	0	1	0
Canadian Championships	3	3	0
World Team Trophy	0	1	0
World Junior Championships	0	2	0
Junior Grand Prix Final	1	1	0
Medal list
World Championships
Bronze medal – third place	2008 Gothenburg	Pairs
Four Continents Championships
Silver medal – second place	2009 Vancouver	Pairs
Canadian Championships
Gold medal – first place	2007 Halifax	Pairs
Gold medal – first place	2009 Saskatoon	Pairs
Gold medal – first place	2010 London	Pairs
Silver medal – second place	2006 Ottawa	Pairs
Silver medal – second place	2008 Vancouver	Pairs
Silver medal – second place	2012 Moncton	Pairs
World Team Trophy
Silver medal – second place	2009 Tokyo	Team
World Junior Championships
Silver medal – second place	2004 The Hague	Pairs
Silver medal – second place	2005 Kitchener	Pairs
Junior Grand Prix Final
Gold medal – first place	2003–04 Malmö	Pairs
Silver medal – second place	2002–03 The Hague	Pairs

Jessica Dubé (born October 29, 1987) is a Canadian former competitive figure skater who is best known for her pairs career with Bryce Davison. They are the 2008 World bronze medallists, the 2009 Four Continents silver medallists, and three-time Canadian national champions (2007, 2009, 2010). They represented Canada at the 2006 and 2010 Winter Olympics. With later partner Sébastien Wolfe, Dubé is the 2012 Canadian national silver medallist.

== Career ==
=== Early years ===
Jessica Dubé began skating at age four. She eventually took up pair skating and competed for a few seasons with Samuel Tetrault. During the 2002–03 season, they won silver at the Junior Grand Prix Final and also became Canadian junior champions.

=== Partnership with Davison ===
Dubé teamed up with Bryce Davison in July 2003. The two had a successful junior career before moving up to the senior level in 2005–06. They placed 10th at the 2006 Winter Olympic Games and 7th at the World Championships that same season. She has also competed in singles skating. Her highest finish in the senior ladies' event at the Canadian Championships was 6th in 2008; internationally, she was a medallist at two junior Grand Prix events.

In the summer of 2006, Dubé suffered an injury in practice and was removed from the ice on a backboard; she had knee surgery in September. They trained both short and long programs for nationals, while Jessica also trained a short program for the singles event. They won their first national crown in Nova Scotia at the 2007 Canadian Championships. After an on-ice accident at the 2007 Four Continents (see below), they made a comeback a month later at the World Championships, where they again finished seventh.

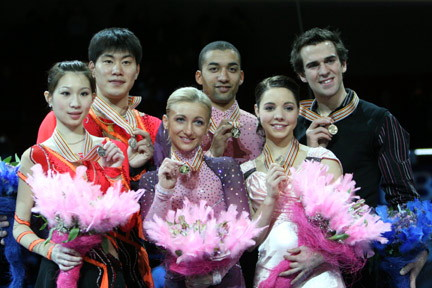
Dubé and Davison on the podium at 2008 Worlds

Dube and Davison had a breakthrough season in 2007–08. They won their first Grand Prix medals, including a gold at 2007 Skate America. They lost the national title to Anabelle Langlois and Cody Hay at the 2008 Canadian Championships, but two months later at the World Championships, they won the bronze medal after finishing second in the long program; they set personal best scores in each segment of the event and overall.

The next two seasons did not prove as successful, and while they regained and then defended their national title, the pair were unable to repeat their success at the World Championships. Their top placement during this time was a second-place finish at the 2009 Four Continents Championships. Dube and Davison were part of Team Canada at the inaugural World Team Trophy in April 2009. In the 2009–10 Olympic season, they medalled at both Grand Prix events but did not qualify for the Grand Prix final. They were sixth at the Olympics and at Worlds.

Dubé and Davison withdrew from 2010 Skate Canada International after Davison suffered a knee injury. Davison underwent season-ending surgery to reattach a broken piece of bone.

Dubé elected to compete as a singles skater in 2010–11. She qualified for Canadian Nationals, and competed in the ladies' event for the first time in three years, her last appearance being in 2008 when she finished 6th. Despite falling ill with a virus on the morning of the free skate, she skated to a 6th-place finish in 2011.

Dubé and Davison announced the end of their partnership on March 10, 2011. Dubé said she intended to continue as a singles skater but did not rule out returning to pair skating in the future.

=== Accidents ===
On February 8, 2007, Dubé was struck in the face by the blade of Davison's skate during the free skate segment at the Four Continents Championships in Colorado Springs. The pair were on their third rotation of a side-by-side camel spin, in which one leg is horizontal during the spin, when they began to drift towards one another, causing her face and his skate blade to connect. She immediately fell to the ice and clutched at her face as blood pooled on the ice. Davison comforted her as the medical staff put her on a stretcher and took her to Memorial Hospital. She underwent surgery that night, receiving 83 stitches to repair a laceration on her left cheek and nose. Her eye was not affected and nothing was broken. Both skaters were later treated for post-traumatic stress disorder, but by March 2007 they had returned to competition together.

In April 2009, at the gala exhibition of the 2009 World Team Trophy in Tokyo, Dubé accidentally struck Davison on the head during a triple twist; he was unable to catch her and she crashed to the ice, hitting her head. Dubé and Davison were hospitalized as a precautionary measure, but neither was seriously injured.

=== Partnership with Wolfe ===
On April 17, 2011, Dubé announced that she had teamed up with Sébastien Wolfe. The pair made their competitive debut at the Liberty Summer competition in July, winning the free skate. They were coached by Annie Barabe and also worked with John Zimmerman on pair elements. Dubé and Wolfe made their international debut together at the 2011 Nebelhorn Trophy, where they finished 6th. They competed at two Grand Prix events, 2011 Skate Canada International, where they finished 5th, and 2011 Trophee Eric Bompard, where they were 6th. Dubé and Wolfe won the silver medal at the 2012 Canadian Championships and were assigned to Four Continents and Worlds. At the 2012 Four Continents, they finished 8th.

In the 2012–2013 season, Dubé and Wolfe were assigned two Grand Prix events, the 2012 Skate America and 2012 Rostelecom Cup, but withdrew from both. Dubé had an injury to her right foot which affected their training. After several months of consideration, Dubé and Wolfe announced on January 9, 2013 that they had both decided to retire from competition. Dubé has completed her initial National Coaching Certification Program (NCCP) and begun coaching alongside Yvan Desjardins and Michelle Godbout.

== Personal life ==
Dubé has an older sister, Veronique, who competed at the national level. Dubé lost part of a finger in a lawnmower accident at the age of four. Following her competitive retirement, Dubé moved to Montreal to study communication at Concordia University.

In June 2023, Dube and her partner, Dominique Blanchette, welcomed a daughter named Elsie.

== Programs ==
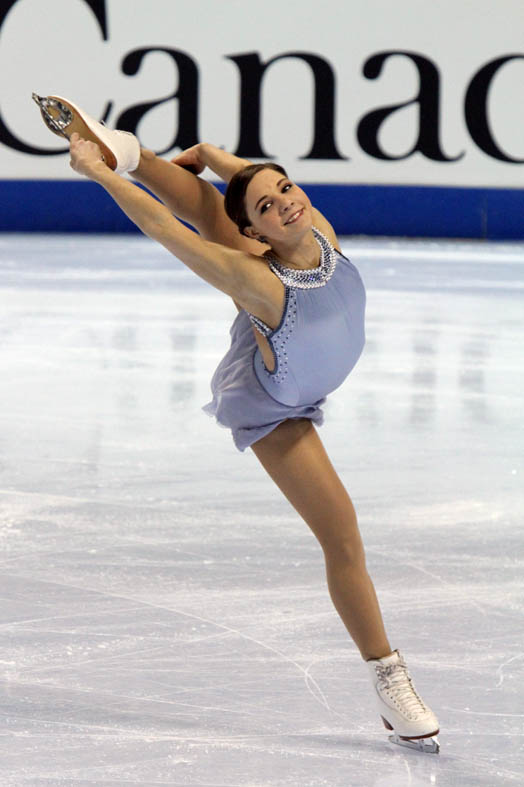
Dubé competing in the ladies' event at the 2011 Canadian Nationals

=== With Wolfe ===
Season	Short program	Free skating	Exhibition
2012–2013	Three Hours Past Midnight by James Collin	Legends of the Fall by James Horner	
2011–2012	Three Hours Past Midnight by James Collin	Heroes by Philip Glass: Sense of Doubt; Neuköln; VS Schneider	

=== With Davison ===
Season	Short program	Free skating	Exhibition
2009–2010	Requiem For a Dream by Clint Mansell	The Way We Were by Marvin Hamlisch	Fix You by Coldplay
2008–2009	Fix You by Coldplay	Carmen by Georges Bizet	On fire by Switchfoot
2006–2008	Galicia Flamenca by Gino D'Auri	The Blower's Daughter by Damien Rice	
2005–2006	Hasta Que Te Conocí by Raúl Di Blasio	Piano Concerto No.7 by George Gershwin	Endless Love by Lionel Richie, Diana Ross
2004–2005	Hasta Que Te Conocí by Raúl Di Blasio	Romeo and Juliet (1968 film) by Nino Rota, André Rieu; Dance of the Knights by Sergei Prokofiev	My Immortal by Evanescence
2003–2004	Whose Woods These Are by David Tolk	Romeo and Juliet by Sergei Prokofiev	

=== Singles career ===
Season	Short program	Free skating
2010–2011	Amélie by Yann Tiersen	The Umbrellas of Cherbourg by Michel Legrand

== Competitive highlights ==
=== With Wolfe ===
Results
International
Event	11–12	12–13
Worlds	12th	
Four Continents	8th	
GP Rostelecom Cup		WD
GP Skate America		WD
GP Skate Canada	6th	
GP Trophée Bompard	5th	
Nebelhorn Trophy	6th	
National
Canadian Champ.	2nd	WD
GP = Grand Prix; WD = Withdrew

=== With Davison ===
Results
International
Event	03–04	04–05	05–06	06–07	07–08	08–09	09–10
Olympics			10th				6th
Worlds			7th	7th	3rd	7th	6th
Four Continents				WD		2nd	
GP Final					4th		
GP Bompard							2nd
GP Cup of China			4th				
GP NHK Trophy					3rd	3rd	
GP Skate America			6th		1st		
GP Skate Canada					2nd	2nd	3rd
International: Junior
Junior Worlds	2nd	2nd					
JGP Final	1st	WD					
JGP China		2nd					
JGP Japan	1st						
JGP Mexico	1st						
JGP U.S.		1st					
National
Canadian Champ.	1st J.	WD	2nd	1st	2nd	1st	1st
GP = Grand Prix; JGP = Junior Grand Prix; J. = Junior level; WD = Withdrew

=== With Tetrault ===
International
Event	01–02	02–03
Junior Worlds		9th
JGP Final	6th	2nd
JGP Canada		3rd
JGP Germany		1st
JGP Japan	2nd	
JGP Netherlands	3rd	
National
Canadian Champ.	1st N.	1st J.
Levels: N. = Novice; J. = Junior; JGP = Junior Grand Prix

=== Singles ===
International
Event	01–02	02–03	03–04	04–05	05–06	06–07	07–08	10–11
JGP China				3rd				
JGP Germany				WD				
JGP Mexico			3rd					
JGP Poland			6th					
International: Novice
Mladost Trophy	3rd							
National
Canadian Champ.	2nd N	5th J	2nd J		8th	WD	6th	6th
Levels: N. = Novice; J. = Junior; WD = Withdrew
