= Viktória Pavuk =

Hungarian figure skater

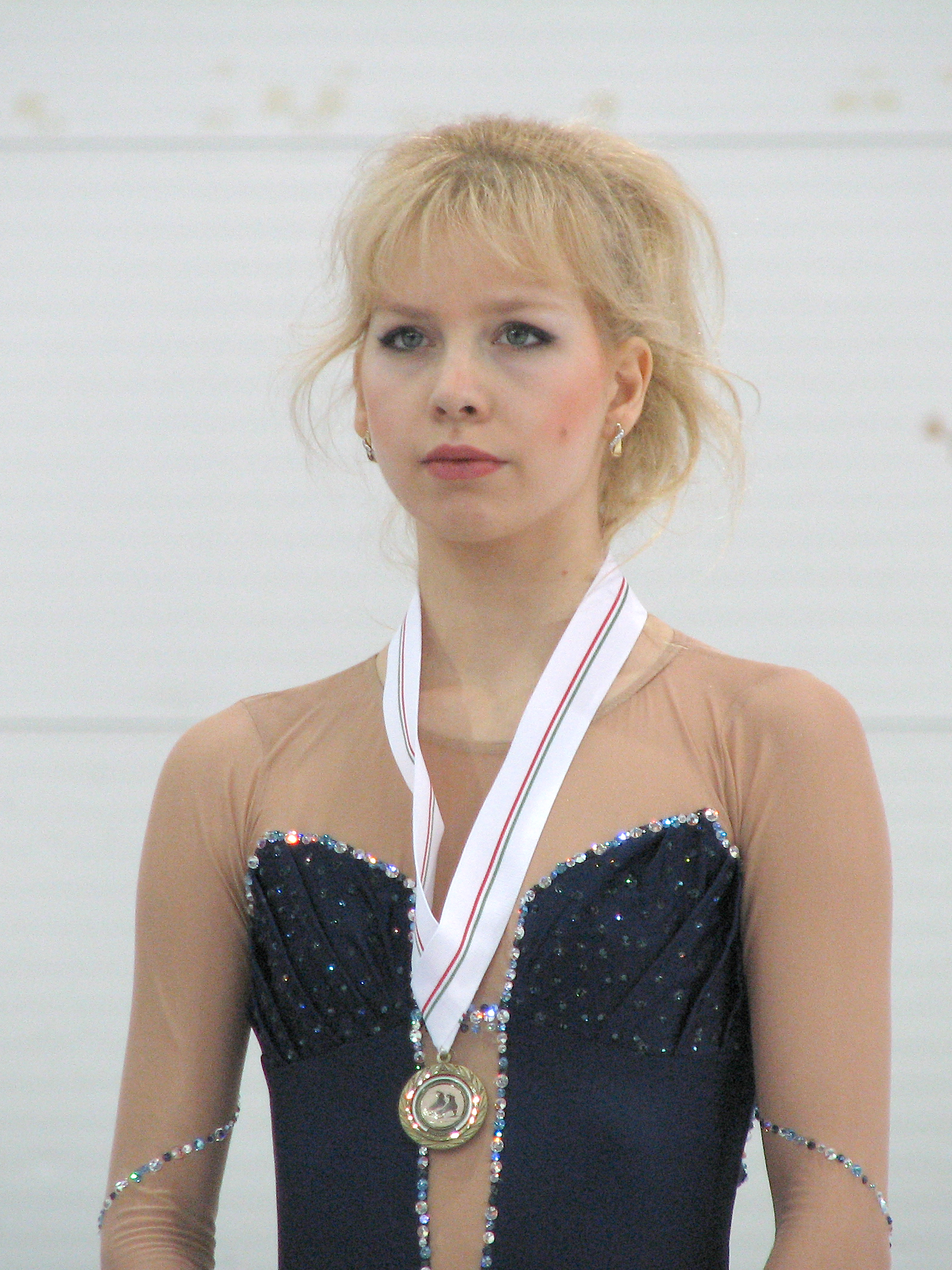
- Viktória Pavuk at the 2007-2008 Hungarian Championship.

Personal information
- Born: 30 December 1985 (age 40) Budapest, Hungarian People's Republic
- Height: 1.70 m (5 ft 7 in)

Figure skating career
- Country: Hungary
- Coach: Patricia Pavuk, István Simon, Szabolcs Vidrai
- Skating club: M.T.K. Budapest
- Began skating: 1988
- Retired: December 2012
Medal record
Figure skating: Ladies' singles
Representing Hungary
Junior Grand Prix Final
Bronze medal – third place	2003–04 Malmö	Ladies' singles

Viktória Pavuk (born 30 December 1985, in Budapest) is a Hungarian former competitive figure skater. She is a two-time International Cup of Nice champion and the 2011 Hungarian national champion.

Pavuk's first coach was István Simon and she also spent summers training with Igor Tchiniaev. She was later coached by her sister. In December 2012, Pavuk announced her retirement from competitive skating.

== Programs ==
Season	Short program	Free skating
2011–12	Romeo and Juliet Overture by Pyotr Tchaikovsky	Black Swan by Pyotr Tchaikovsky, Clint Mansell
2007–08	The Umbrellas of Cherbourg by Michel Legrand	Adagio in G minor by Remo Giazotto, Tomaso Albinoni
2006–07	Would You; Touch and Go	Sheherazade by Nikolai Rimsky-Korsakov
2005–06	Swan Lake by Pyotr Tchaikovsky	Vltava by Bedřich Smetana; L'elisir d'amore by Gaetano Donizetti; Storm (from Four Seasons) by Antonio Vivaldi
2004–05	Symphony No. 5 by Ludwig van Beethoven performed by Edvin Marton	Selection by Ennio Morricone
2003–04	Toccata and Fugue in D minor by Johann Sebastian Bach performed by Vanessa-Mae	Miss You performed by Edvin Marton; Rhapsody in Rock by Robert Wells
2002–03	Victory by Bond	The Four Seasons (modern version) by Antonio Vivaldi performed by Vanessa-Mae; Picante by Vanessa-Mae
2001–02	Victory by Bond	Afro-Latin mix

== Competitive highlights ==
GP: Grand Prix; JGP: Junior Grand Prix

International
Event	00–01	01–02	02–03	03–04	04–05	05–06	06–07	07–08	08–09	09–10	10–11	11–12
Olympics						23rd						
Worlds					18th	25th					30th	51st
Europeans				4th		12th	18th				19th	
GP Bompard								7th				
GP Cup of China						6th						
GP Cup of Russia							12th					
GP NHK Trophy						9th						
Crystal Skate			3rd	1st					3rd		8th	8th
Cup of Nice							1st	1st	17th			
Golden Spin											11th	
Merano Cup											8th	
Nepela Memorial					1st			7th			WD	
Skate Israel						1st						
Universiade									19th			
International: Junior
Junior Worlds	21st	13th	12th	6th								
JGP Final				3rd								
JGP Italy			3rd									
JGP Poland				1st								
JGP Slovakia			4th									
JGP Slovenia				3rd								
EYOF			3rd									
National
Hungarian	1st J	3rd	1st J	2nd			2nd	3rd	5th		1st	
J = Junior level; WD = Withdrew
