= 2006–07 ISU World Standings =

Merit-based ice skating ranking

Season-end No. 1 skaters
- Men's singles: (Japan) Daisuke Takahashi
- Ladies' singles: (Japan) Mao Asada
- Pairs: (China) Dan Zhang / Hao Zhang
- Ice dance: (Canada) Marie-France Dubreuil / Patrice Lauzon

Navigation

The 2006–07 ISU World Standings are the World Standings published by the International Skating Union (ISU) during the 2006–07 season.

The 2006–07 ISU World Standings for single & pair skating and ice dance, are taking into account results of the 2004–05, 2005–06 and 2006–07 seasons.

== World Standings for single & pair skating and ice dance ==
=== Season-end standings ===
The remainder of this section is a list, by discipline, published by the ISU.

==== Men's singles (30 skaters) ====
As of 24 March 2007

| Rank | Nation | Skater | Points | Season | ISU Championships or Olympics | (Junior) Grand Prix and Final | | Selected International Competition | |
| Rank | Nation | Skater | Points | Season | Best | Best | 2nd Best | Best | 2nd Best |
|---|---|---|---|---|---|---|---|---|---|
| 1 | JPN | Daisuke Takahashi | 4505 | 2006/2007 season (100%) | 1150 | 750 | 400 | 150 | 0 |
| 1 | JPN | Daisuke Takahashi | 4505 | 2005/2006 season (100%) | 850 | 700 | 400 | 0 | 0 |
| 1 | JPN | Daisuke Takahashi | 4505 | 2004/2005 season (70%) | 539 | 0 | 0 | 105 | 0 |
| 2 | FRA | Brian Joubert | 4345 | 2006/2007 season (100%) | 1200 | 800 | 400 | 0 | 0 |
| 2 | FRA | Brian Joubert | 4345 | 2005/2006 season (100%) | 1150 | 375 | 350 | 0 | 0 |
| 2 | FRA | Brian Joubert | 4345 | 2004/2005 season (70%) | 665 | 420 | 280 | 0 | 0 |
| 3 | JPN | Nobunari Oda | 4200 | 2006/2007 season (100%) | 900 | 700 | 400 | 100 | 0 |
| 3 | JPN | Nobunari Oda | 4200 | 2005/2006 season (100%) | 1050 | 650 | 400 | 0 | 0 |
| 3 | JPN | Nobunari Oda | 4200 | 2004/2005 season (70%) | 501 | 140 | 123 | 0 | 0 |
| 4 | CAN | Jeffrey Buttle | 4005 | 2006/2007 season (100%) | 950 | 0 | 0 | 0 | 0 |
| 4 | CAN | Jeffrey Buttle | 4005 | 2005/2006 season (100%) | 1100 | 750 | 400 | 0 | 0 |
| 4 | CAN | Jeffrey Buttle | 4005 | 2004/2005 season (70%) | 805 | 525 | 280 | 0 | 0 |
| 5 | SUI | Stéphane Lambiel | 3875 | 2006/2007 season (100%) | 1100 | 400 | 0 | 0 | 0 |
| 5 | SUI | Stéphane Lambiel | 3875 | 2005/2006 season (100%) | 1200 | 800 | 375 | 0 | 0 |
| 5 | SUI | Stéphane Lambiel | 3875 | 2004/2005 season (70%) | 840 | 0 | 0 | 0 | 0 |
| 6 | USA | Evan Lysacek | 3625 | 2006/2007 season (100%) | 1000 | 400 | 375 | 0 | 0 |
| 6 | USA | Evan Lysacek | 3625 | 2005/2006 season (100%) | 1100 | 375 | 375 | 0 | 0 |
| 6 | USA | Evan Lysacek | 3625 | 2004/2005 season (70%) | 770 | 210 | 210 | 0 | 0 |
| 7 | CAN | Emanuel Sandhu | 3435 | 2006/2007 season (100%) | 560 | 350 | 300 | 0 | 0 |
| 7 | CAN | Emanuel Sandhu | 3435 | 2005/2006 season (100%) | 1000 | 600 | 400 | 0 | 0 |
| 7 | CAN | Emanuel Sandhu | 3435 | 2004/2005 season (70%) | 630 | 455 | 280 | 0 | 0 |
| 8 | USA | Johnny Weir | 3205 | 2006/2007 season (100%) | 850 | 375 | 350 | 0 | 0 |
| 8 | USA | Johnny Weir | 3205 | 2005/2006 season (100%) | 1000 | 350 | 250 | 0 | 0 |
| 8 | USA | Johnny Weir | 3205 | 2004/2005 season (70%) | 735 | 280 | 280 | 0 | 0 |
| 9 | RUS | Evgeni Plushenko | 3028 | 2006/2007 season (100%) | 0 | 0 | 0 | 0 | 0 |
| 9 | RUS | Evgeni Plushenko | 3028 | 2005/2006 season (100%) | 1200 | 400 | 0 | 0 | 0 |
| 9 | RUS | Evgeni Plushenko | 3028 | 2004/2005 season (70%) | 588 | 560 | 280 | 0 | 0 |
| 10 | FRA | Alban Préaubert | 3008 | 2006/2007 season (100%) | 700 | 650 | 375 | 0 | 0 |
| 10 | FRA | Alban Préaubert | 3008 | 2005/2006 season (100%) | 850 | 275 | 0 | 0 | 0 |
| 10 | FRA | Alban Préaubert | 3008 | 2004/2005 season (70%) | 333 | 158 | 0 | 0 | 0 |
| 11 | BEL | Kevin van der Perren | 2965 | 2006/2007 season (100%) | 770 | 325 | 275 | 0 | 0 |
| 11 | BEL | Kevin van der Perren | 2965 | 2005/2006 season (100%) | 800 | 325 | 300 | 100 | 0 |
| 11 | BEL | Kevin van der Perren | 2965 | 2004/2005 season (70%) | 595 | 210 | 0 | 70 | 0 |
| 12 | CHN | Chengjiang Li | 2902 | 2006/2007 season (100%) | 0 | 325 | 0 | 100 | 0 |
| 12 | CHN | Chengjiang Li | 2902 | 2005/2006 season (100%) | 800 | 225 | 0 | 0 | 0 |
| 12 | CHN | Chengjiang Li | 2902 | 2004/2005 season (70%) | 700 | 490 | 262 | 0 | 0 |
| 13 | USA | Stephen Carriere | 2790 | 2006/2007 season (100%) | 715 | 600 | 250 | 0 | 0 |
| 13 | USA | Stephen Carriere | 2790 | 2005/2006 season (100%) | 625 | 350 | 250 | 0 | 0 |
| 13 | USA | Stephen Carriere | 2790 | 2004/2005 season (70%) | 0 | 105 | 0 | 0 | 0 |
| 14 | BLR | Sergei Davydov | 2458 | 2006/2007 season (100%) | 750 | 375 | 300 | 0 | 0 |
| 14 | BLR | Sergei Davydov | 2458 | 2005/2006 season (100%) | 650 | 225 | 0 | 0 | 0 |
| 14 | BLR | Sergei Davydov | 2458 | 2004/2005 season (70%) | 318 | 158 | 0 | 0 | 0 |
| 15 | CAN | Patrick Chan | 2450 | 2006/2007 season (100%) | 685 | 300 | 250 | 0 | 0 |
| 15 | CAN | Patrick Chan | 2450 | 2005/2006 season (100%) | 565 | 400 | 250 | 0 | 0 |
| 15 | CAN | Patrick Chan | 2450 | 2004/2005 season (70%) | 374 | 0 | 0 | 0 | 0 |
| 16 | FRA | Yannick Ponsero | 2280 | 2006/2007 season (100%) | 550 | 275 | 250 | 0 | 0 |
| 16 | FRA | Yannick Ponsero | 2280 | 2005/2006 season (100%) | 655 | 300 | 250 | 0 | 0 |
| 16 | FRA | Yannick Ponsero | 2280 | 2004/2005 season (70%) | 479 | 175 | 105 | 0 | 0 |
| 17 | GER | Stefan Lindemann | 2206 | 2006/2007 season (100%) | 650 | 0 | 0 | 0 | 0 |
| 17 | GER | Stefan Lindemann | 2206 | 2005/2006 season (100%) | 455 | 325 | 0 | 150 | 0 |
| 17 | GER | Stefan Lindemann | 2206 | 2004/2005 season (70%) | 539 | 245 | 192 | 105 | 0 |
| 18 | CAN | Shawn Sawyer | 2192 | 2006/2007 season (100%) | 0 | 325 | 225 | 0 | 0 |
| 18 | CAN | Shawn Sawyer | 2192 | 2005/2006 season (100%) | 650 | 275 | 250 | 0 | 0 |
| 18 | CAN | Shawn Sawyer | 2192 | 2004/2005 season (70%) | 465 | 227 | 0 | 0 | 0 |
| 19 | JPN | Takahiko Kozuka | 2190 | 2006/2007 season (100%) | 0 | 350 | 275 | 0 | 0 |
| 19 | JPN | Takahiko Kozuka | 2190 | 2005/2006 season (100%) | 715 | 600 | 250 | 0 | 0 |
| 19 | JPN | Takahiko Kozuka | 2190 | 2004/2005 season (70%) | 0 | 70 | 0 | 0 | 0 |
| 20 | CAN | Christopher Mabee | 2180 | 2006/2007 season (100%) | 700 | 0 | 0 | 0 | 0 |
| 20 | CAN | Christopher Mabee | 2180 | 2005/2006 season (100%) | 805 | 325 | 0 | 0 | 0 |
| 20 | CAN | Christopher Mabee | 2180 | 2004/2005 season (70%) | 312 | 175 | 175 | 0 | 0 |
| 21 | CHN | Min Zhang | 2139 | 2006/2007 season (100%) | 0 | 0 | 0 | 0 | 0 |
| 21 | CHN | Min Zhang | 2139 | 2005/2006 season (100%) | 750 | 300 | 225 | 0 | 0 |
| 21 | CHN | Min Zhang | 2139 | 2004/2005 season (70%) | 392 | 245 | 227 | 0 | 0 |
| 22 | USA | Matthew Savoie | 2098 | 2006/2007 season (100%) | 0 | 0 | 0 | 0 | 0 |
| 22 | USA | Matthew Savoie | 2098 | 2005/2006 season (100%) | 900 | 300 | 250 | 0 | 0 |
| 22 | USA | Matthew Savoie | 2098 | 2004/2005 season (70%) | 490 | 158 | 0 | 0 | 0 |
| 23 | RUS | Alexander Uspenski | 1980 | 2006/2007 season (100%) | 0 | 300 | 275 | 100 | 0 |
| 23 | RUS | Alexander Uspenski | 1980 | 2005/2006 season (100%) | 505 | 450 | 250 | 0 | 0 |
| 23 | RUS | Alexander Uspenski | 1980 | 2004/2005 season (70%) | 0 | 350 | 175 | 0 | 0 |
| 24 | RUS | Sergei Dobrin | 1963 | 2006/2007 season (100%) | 245 | 350 | 225 | 50 | 0 |
| 24 | RUS | Sergei Dobrin | 1963 | 2005/2006 season (100%) | 350 | 250 | 0 | 0 | 0 |
| 24 | RUS | Sergei Dobrin | 1963 | 2004/2005 season (70%) | 458 | 280 | 158 | 0 | 0 |
| 25 | RUS | Andrei Griazev | 1915 | 2006/2007 season (100%) | 315 | 250 | 250 | 0 | 0 |
| 25 | RUS | Andrei Griazev | 1915 | 2005/2006 season (100%) | 400 | 350 | 0 | 0 | 0 |
| 25 | RUS | Andrei Griazev | 1915 | 2004/2005 season (70%) | 490 | 175 | 0 | 0 | 0 |
| 26 | JPN | Yasuharu Nanri | 1870 | 2006/2007 season (100%) | 455 | 0 | 0 | 0 | 0 |
| 26 | JPN | Yasuharu Nanri | 1870 | 2005/2006 season (100%) | 630 | 225 | 0 | 0 | 0 |
| 26 | JPN | Yasuharu Nanri | 1870 | 2004/2005 season (70%) | 396 | 385 | 175 | 0 | 0 |
| 27 | CHN | Jinlin Guan | 1728 | 2006/2007 season (100%) | 565 | 225 | 0 | 0 | 0 |
| 27 | CHN | Jinlin Guan | 1728 | 2005/2006 season (100%) | 205 | 225 | 175 | 0 | 0 |
| 27 | CHN | Jinlin Guan | 1728 | 2004/2005 season (70%) | 416 | 122 | 0 | 0 | 0 |
| 28 | ROM | Gheorghe Chiper | 1536 | 2006/2007 season (100%) | 0 | 0 | 0 | 0 | 0 |
| 28 | ROM | Gheorghe Chiper | 1536 | 2005/2006 season (100%) | 560 | 350 | 0 | 0 | 0 |
| 28 | ROM | Gheorghe Chiper | 1536 | 2004/2005 season (70%) | 416 | 210 | 0 | 0 | 0 |
| 29 | BUL | Ivan Dinev | 1502 | 2006/2007 season (100%) | 0 | 0 | 0 | 0 | 0 |
| 29 | BUL | Ivan Dinev | 1502 | 2005/2006 season (100%) | 490 | 225 | 0 | 0 | 0 |
| 29 | BUL | Ivan Dinev | 1502 | 2004/2005 season (70%) | 420 | 192 | 175 | 0 | 0 |
| 30 | JPN | Ryo Shibata | 1425 | 2006/2007 season (100%) | 0 | 0 | 0 | 0 | 0 |
| 30 | JPN | Ryo Shibata | 1425 | 2005/2006 season (100%) | 385 | 300 | 250 | 0 | 0 |
| 30 | JPN | Ryo Shibata | 1425 | 2004/2005 season (70%) | 0 | 315 | 175 | 0 | 0 |

==== Ladies' singles (30 skaters) ====
As of 24 March 2007

| Rank | Nation | Skater | Points | Season | ISU Championships or Olympics | (Junior) Grand Prix and Final | | Selected International Competition | |
| Rank | Nation | Skater | Points | Season | Best | Best | 2nd Best | Best | 2nd Best |
|---|---|---|---|---|---|---|---|---|---|
| 1 | JPN | Mao Asada | 4205 | 2006/2007 season (100%) | 1150 | 750 | 400 | 0 | 0 |
| 1 | JPN | Mao Asada | 4205 | 2005/2006 season (100%) | 685 | 800 | 400 | 0 | 0 |
| 1 | JPN | Mao Asada | 4205 | 2004/2005 season (70%) | 501 | 420 | 175 | 0 | 0 |
| 2 | KOR | Yuna Kim | 4000 | 2006/2007 season (100%) | 1100 | 800 | 400 | 0 | 0 |
| 2 | KOR | Yuna Kim | 4000 | 2005/2006 season (100%) | 715 | 600 | 250 | 0 | 0 |
| 2 | KOR | Yuna Kim | 4000 | 2004/2005 season (70%) | 480 | 385 | 175 | 0 | 0 |
| 3 | JPN | Yukari Nakano | 3975 | 2006/2007 season (100%) | 1000 | 375 | 350 | 150 | 0 |
| 3 | JPN | Yukari Nakano | 3975 | 2005/2006 season (100%) | 1000 | 700 | 400 | 0 | 0 |
| 3 | JPN | Yukari Nakano | 3975 | 2004/2005 season (70%) | 343 | 0 | 0 | 0 | 0 |
| 4 | JPN | Miki Ando | 3970 | 2006/2007 season (100%) | 1200 | 600 | 400 | 0 | 0 |
| 4 | JPN | Miki Ando | 3970 | 2005/2006 season (100%) | 500 | 650 | 375 | 0 | 0 |
| 4 | JPN | Miki Ando | 3970 | 2004/2005 season (70%) | 665 | 455 | 263 | 0 | 0 |
| 5 | USA | Kimmie Meissner | 3625 | 2006/2007 season (100%) | 1050 | 375 | 350 | 0 | 0 |
| 5 | USA | Kimmie Meissner | 3625 | 2005/2006 season (100%) | 1200 | 300 | 300 | 0 | 0 |
| 5 | USA | Kimmie Meissner | 3625 | 2004/2005 season (70%) | 438 | 350 | 158 | 0 | 0 |
| 6 | JPN | Fumie Suguri | 3578 | 2006/2007 season (100%) | 0 | 650 | 375 | 100 | 0 |
| 6 | JPN | Fumie Suguri | 3578 | 2005/2006 season (100%) | 1150 | 375 | 225 | 0 | 0 |
| 6 | JPN | Fumie Suguri | 3578 | 2004/2005 season (70%) | 700 | 228 | 228 | 0 | 0 |
| 7 | SUI | Sarah Meier | 3500 | 2006/2007 season (100%) | 900 | 700 | 400 | 0 | 0 |
| 7 | SUI | Sarah Meier | 3500 | 2005/2006 season (100%) | 950 | 300 | 250 | 0 | 0 |
| 7 | SUI | Sarah Meier | 3500 | 2004/2005 season (70%) | 385 | 0 | 0 | 0 | 0 |
| 8 | RUS | Elena Sokolova | 3405 | 2006/2007 season (100%) | 630 | 325 | 250 | 0 | 0 |
| 8 | RUS | Elena Sokolova | 3405 | 2005/2006 season (100%) | 1050 | 600 | 400 | 150 | 0 |
| 8 | RUS | Elena Sokolova | 3405 | 2004/2005 season (70%) | 630 | 245 | 228 | 0 | 0 |
| 9 | CAN | Joannie Rochette | 3360 | 2006/2007 season (100%) | 770 | 400 | 325 | 0 | 0 |
| 9 | CAN | Joannie Rochette | 3360 | 2005/2006 season (100%) | 1000 | 375 | 325 | 0 | 0 |
| 9 | CAN | Joannie Rochette | 3360 | 2004/2005 season (70%) | 490 | 490 | 280 | 0 | 0 |
| 10 | JPN | Shizuka Arakawa | 3265 | 2006/2007 season (100%) | 0 | 0 | 0 | 0 | 0 |
| 10 | JPN | Shizuka Arakawa | 3265 | 2005/2006 season (100%) | 1200 | 350 | 350 | 0 | 0 |
| 10 | JPN | Shizuka Arakawa | 3265 | 2004/2005 season (70%) | 560 | 525 | 280 | 0 | 0 |
| 11 | FIN | Susanna Pöykiö | 3025 | 2006/2007 season (100%) | 850 | 300 | 300 | 100 | 0 |
| 11 | FIN | Susanna Pöykiö | 3025 | 2005/2006 season (100%) | 800 | 325 | 0 | 0 | 0 |
| 11 | FIN | Susanna Pöykiö | 3025 | 2004/2005 season (70%) | 595 | 245 | 210 | 105 | 0 |
| 12 | USA | Emily Hughes | 2955 | 2006/2007 season (100%) | 805 | 350 | 300 | 0 | 0 |
| 12 | USA | Emily Hughes | 2955 | 2005/2006 season (100%) | 900 | 300 | 300 | 0 | 0 |
| 12 | USA | Emily Hughes | 2955 | 2004/2005 season (70%) | 459 | 0 | 0 | 0 | 0 |
| 13 | JPN | Yoshie Onda | 2940 | 2006/2007 season (100%) | 665 | 350 | 250 | 0 | 0 |
| 13 | JPN | Yoshie Onda | 2940 | 2005/2006 season (100%) | 700 | 350 | 350 | 0 | 0 |
| 13 | JPN | Yoshie Onda | 2940 | 2004/2005 season (70%) | 564 | 420 | 263 | 105 | 0 |
| 14 | USA | Alissa Czisny | 2868 | 2006/2007 season (100%) | 700 | 325 | 0 | 0 | 0 |
| 14 | USA | Alissa Czisny | 2868 | 2005/2006 season (100%) | 565 | 550 | 400 | 100 | 0 |
| 14 | USA | Alissa Czisny | 2868 | 2004/2005 season (70%) | 396 | 228 | 0 | 0 | 0 |
| 15 | HUN | Júlia Sebestyén | 2835 | 2006/2007 season (100%) | 650 | 550 | 400 | 50 | 0 |
| 15 | HUN | Júlia Sebestyén | 2835 | 2005/2006 season (100%) | 385 | 275 | 225 | 150 | 0 |
| 15 | HUN | Júlia Sebestyén | 2835 | 2004/2005 season (70%) | 515 | 245 | 245 | 0 | 0 |
| 16 | ITA | Carolina Kostner | 2748 | 2006/2007 season (100%) | 950 | 0 | 0 | 0 | 0 |
| 16 | ITA | Carolina Kostner | 2748 | 2005/2006 season (100%) | 800 | 275 | 250 | 0 | 0 |
| 16 | ITA | Carolina Kostner | 2748 | 2004/2005 season (70%) | 770 | 263 | 210 | 0 | 0 |
| 17 | FIN | Kiira Korpi | 2710 | 2006/2007 season (100%) | 770 | 275 | 250 | 150 | 0 |
| 17 | FIN | Kiira Korpi | 2710 | 2005/2006 season (100%) | 750 | 200 | 100 | 0 | 0 |
| 17 | FIN | Kiira Korpi | 2710 | 2004/2005 season (70%) | 312 | 315 | 175 | 0 | 0 |
| 18 | JPN | Aki Sawada | 2655 | 2006/2007 season (100%) | 735 | 300 | 225 | 0 | 0 |
| 18 | JPN | Aki Sawada | 2655 | 2005/2006 season (100%) | 595 | 550 | 250 | 0 | 0 |
| 18 | JPN | Aki Sawada | 2655 | 2004/2005 season (70%) | 333 | 210 | 158 | 0 | 0 |
| 19 | USA | Beatrisa Liang | 2361 | 2006/2007 season (100%) | 0 | 325 | 300 | 150 | 0 |
| 19 | USA | Beatrisa Liang | 2361 | 2005/2006 season (100%) | 770 | 325 | 0 | 50 | 0 |
| 19 | USA | Beatrisa Liang | 2361 | 2004/2005 season (70%) | 441 | 0 | 0 | 0 | 0 |
| 20 | USA | Sasha Cohen | 2330 | 2006/2007 season (100%) | 0 | 0 | 0 | 0 | 0 |
| 20 | USA | Sasha Cohen | 2330 | 2005/2006 season (100%) | 1150 | 375 | 0 | 0 | 0 |
| 20 | USA | Sasha Cohen | 2330 | 2004/2005 season (70%) | 805 | 0 | 0 | 0 | 0 |
| 21 | CHN | Binshu Xu | 2295 | 2006/2007 season (100%) | 595 | 325 | 225 | 50 | 0 |
| 21 | CHN | Binshu Xu | 2295 | 2005/2006 season (100%) | 0 | 500 | 225 | 0 | 0 |
| 21 | CHN | Binshu Xu | 2295 | 2004/2005 season (70%) | 375 | 105 | 88 | 0 | 0 |
| 22 | CHN | Yan Liu | 2228 | 2006/2007 season (100%) | 560 | 0 | 0 | 0 | 0 |
| 22 | CHN | Yan Liu | 2228 | 2005/2006 season (100%) | 700 | 325 | 300 | 150 | 0 |
| 22 | CHN | Yan Liu | 2228 | 2004/2005 season (70%) | 417 | 158 | 0 | 35 | 0 |
| 23 | JPN | Nana Takeda | 2150 | 2006/2007 season (100%) | 475 | 400 | 250 | 0 | 0 |
| 23 | JPN | Nana Takeda | 2150 | 2005/2006 season (100%) | 625 | 225 | 175 | 0 | 0 |
| 23 | JPN | Nana Takeda | 2150 | 2004/2005 season (70%) | 0 | 175 | 175 | 0 | 0 |
| 24 | GEO | Elene Gedevanishvili | 2133 | 2006/2007 season (100%) | 595 | 0 | 0 | 150 | 0 |
| 24 | GEO | Elene Gedevanishvili | 2133 | 2005/2006 season (100%) | 750 | 300 | 250 | 0 | 0 |
| 24 | GEO | Elene Gedevanishvili | 2133 | 2004/2005 season (70%) | 417 | 88 | 0 | 0 | 0 |
| 25 | CAN | Mira Leung | 2089 | 2006/2007 season (100%) | 50 | 275 | 225 | 0 | 0 |
| 25 | CAN | Mira Leung | 2089 | 2005/2006 season (100%) | 650 | 275 | 275 | 0 | 0 |
| 25 | CAN | Mira Leung | 2089 | 2004/2005 season (70%) | 354 | 175 | 175 | 35 | 0 |
| 26 | UKR | Elena Liashenko | 2000 | 2006/2007 season (100%) | 0 | 0 | 0 | 0 | 0 |
| 26 | UKR | Elena Liashenko | 2000 | 2005/2006 season (100%) | 400 | 350 | 325 | 0 | 0 |
| 26 | UKR | Elena Liashenko | 2000 | 2004/2005 season (70%) | 539 | 193 | 193 | 0 | 0 |
| 27 | JPN | Mai Asada | 1865 | 2006/2007 season (100%) | 0 | 275 | 275 | 0 | 0 |
| 27 | JPN | Mai Asada | 1865 | 2005/2006 season (100%) | 665 | 400 | 250 | 0 | 0 |
| 27 | JPN | Mai Asada | 1865 | 2004/2005 season (70%) | 0 | 105 | 0 | 0 | 0 |
| 28 | USA | Katy Taylor | 1845 | 2006/2007 season (100%) | 0 | 0 | 0 | 50 | 0 |
| 28 | USA | Katy Taylor | 1845 | 2005/2006 season (100%) | 840 | 450 | 225 | 0 | 0 |
| 28 | USA | Katy Taylor | 1845 | 2004/2005 season (70%) | 0 | 140 | 140 | 0 | 0 |
| 29 | USA | Christine Zukowski | 1780 | 2006/2007 season (100%) | 0 | 300 | 250 | 0 | 0 |
| 29 | USA | Christine Zukowski | 1780 | 2005/2006 season (100%) | 655 | 350 | 225 | 0 | 0 |
| 29 | USA | Christine Zukowski | 1780 | 2004/2005 season (70%) | 0 | 105 | 0 | 0 | 0 |
| 30 | GER | Annette Dytrt | 1753 | 2006/2007 season (100%) | 0 | 0 | 0 | 0 | 0 |
| 30 | GER | Annette Dytrt | 1753 | 2005/2006 season (100%) | 525 | 250 | 225 | 0 | 0 |
| 30 | GER | Annette Dytrt | 1753 | 2004/2005 season (70%) | 350 | 210 | 193 | 0 | 0 |

==== Pairs (30 couples) ====
As of 24 March 2007

| Rank | Nation | Couple | Points | Season | ISU Championships or Olympics | (Junior) Grand Prix and Final | | Selected International Competition | |
| Rank | Nation | Couple | Points | Season | Best | Best | 2nd Best | Best | 2nd Best |
|---|---|---|---|---|---|---|---|---|---|
| 1 | CHN | Dan Zhang / Hao Zhang | 4675 | 2006/2007 season (100%) | 1000 | 700 | 400 | 150 | 0 |
| 1 | CHN | Dan Zhang / Hao Zhang | 4675 | 2005/2006 season (100%) | 1150 | 750 | 400 | 0 | 0 |
| 1 | CHN | Dan Zhang / Hao Zhang | 4675 | 2004/2005 season (70%) | 770 | 420 | 280 | 105 | 0 |
| 2 | CHN | Xue Shen / Hongbo Zhao | 4490 | 2006/2007 season (100%) | 1200 | 800 | 400 | 150 | 0 |
| 2 | CHN | Xue Shen / Hongbo Zhao | 4490 | 2005/2006 season (100%) | 1100 | 0 | 0 | 0 | 0 |
| 2 | CHN | Xue Shen / Hongbo Zhao | 4490 | 2004/2005 season (70%) | 0 | 560 | 280 | 0 | 0 |
| 3 | GER | Aliona Savchenko / Robin Szolkowy | 4485 | 2006/2007 season (100%) | 1100 | 750 | 400 | 0 | 0 |
| 3 | GER | Aliona Savchenko / Robin Szolkowy | 4485 | 2005/2006 season (100%) | 950 | 700 | 400 | 150 | 0 |
| 3 | GER | Aliona Savchenko / Robin Szolkowy | 4485 | 2004/2005 season (70%) | 665 | 245 | 0 | 35 | 0 |
| 4 | CHN | Qing Pang / Jian Tong | 4240 | 2006/2007 season (100%) | 1150 | 375 | 0 | 100 | 0 |
| 4 | CHN | Qing Pang / Jian Tong | 4240 | 2005/2006 season (100%) | 1200 | 550 | 375 | 0 | 0 |
| 4 | CHN | Qing Pang / Jian Tong | 4240 | 2004/2005 season (70%) | 735 | 490 | 263 | 0 | 0 |
| 5 | RUS | Maria Petrova / Alexei Tikhonov | 4030 | 2006/2007 season (100%) | 805 | 550 | 400 | 0 | 0 |
| 5 | RUS | Maria Petrova / Alexei Tikhonov | 4030 | 2005/2006 season (100%) | 1100 | 650 | 400 | 0 | 0 |
| 5 | RUS | Maria Petrova / Alexei Tikhonov | 4030 | 2004/2005 season (70%) | 805 | 525 | 280 | 0 | 0 |
| 6 | USA | Rena Inoue / John Baldwin | 3710 | 2006/2007 season (100%) | 850 | 650 | 400 | 0 | 0 |
| 6 | USA | Rena Inoue / John Baldwin | 3710 | 2005/2006 season (100%) | 1050 | 375 | 325 | 0 | 0 |
| 6 | USA | Rena Inoue / John Baldwin | 3710 | 2004/2005 season (70%) | 490 | 385 | 245 | 0 | 0 |
| 7 | CAN | Valérie Marcoux / Craig Buntin | 3600 | 2006/2007 season (100%) | 950 | 600 | 350 | 0 | 0 |
| 7 | CAN | Valérie Marcoux / Craig Buntin | 3600 | 2005/2006 season (100%) | 1000 | 350 | 350 | 0 | 0 |
| 7 | CAN | Valérie Marcoux / Craig Buntin | 3600 | 2004/2005 season (70%) | 560 | 245 | 210 | 0 | 0 |
| 8 | RUS | Julia Obertas / Sergei Slavnov | 3365 | 2006/2007 season (100%) | 735 | 350 | 275 | 0 | 0 |
| 8 | RUS | Julia Obertas / Sergei Slavnov | 3365 | 2005/2006 season (100%) | 850 | 600 | 375 | 0 | 0 |
| 8 | RUS | Julia Obertas / Sergei Slavnov | 3365 | 2004/2005 season (70%) | 700 | 455 | 263 | 0 | 0 |
| 9 | RUS | Tatiana Totmianina / Maxim Marinin | 3240 | 2006/2007 season (100%) | 0 | 0 | 0 | 0 | 0 |
| 9 | RUS | Tatiana Totmianina / Maxim Marinin | 3240 | 2005/2006 season (100%) | 1200 | 800 | 400 | 0 | 0 |
| 9 | RUS | Tatiana Totmianina / Maxim Marinin | 3240 | 2004/2005 season (70%) | 840 | 0 | 0 | 0 | 0 |
| 10 | POL | Dorota Siudek / Mariusz Siudek | 2970 | 2006/2007 season (100%) | 770 | 375 | 325 | 0 | 0 |
| 10 | POL | Dorota Siudek / Mariusz Siudek | 2970 | 2005/2006 season (100%) | 800 | 350 | 350 | 0 | 0 |
| 10 | POL | Dorota Siudek / Mariusz Siudek | 2970 | 2004/2005 season (70%) | 630 | 245 | 245 | 0 | 0 |
| 11 | CAN | Jessica Dube / Bryce Davison | 2733 | 2006/2007 season (100%) | 900 | 0 | 0 | 0 | 0 |
| 11 | CAN | Jessica Dube / Bryce Davison | 2733 | 2005/2006 season (100%) | 900 | 325 | 275 | 0 | 0 |
| 11 | CAN | Jessica Dube / Bryce Davison | 2733 | 2004/2005 season (70%) | 480 | 175 | 158 | 0 | 0 |
| 12 | USA | Kendra Moyle / Andy Seitz | 2705 | 2006/2007 season (100%) | 595 | 450 | 275 | 0 | 0 |
| 12 | USA | Kendra Moyle / Andy Seitz | 2705 | 2005/2006 season (100%) | 685 | 450 | 250 | 0 | 0 |
| 12 | USA | Kendra Moyle / Andy Seitz | 2705 | 2004/2005 season (70%) | 0 | 0 | 0 | 0 | 0 |
| 13 | RUS | Maria Mukhortova / Maxim Trankov | 2680 | 2006/2007 season (100%) | 700 | 300 | 250 | 0 | 0 |
| 13 | RUS | Maria Mukhortova / Maxim Trankov | 2680 | 2005/2006 season (100%) | 650 | 325 | 250 | 0 | 0 |
| 13 | RUS | Maria Mukhortova / Maxim Trankov | 2680 | 2004/2005 season (70%) | 501 | 420 | 193 | 35 | 0 |
| 14 | CAN | Utako Wakamatsu / Jean-Sebastien Fecteau | 2650 | 2006/2007 season (100%) | 0 | 325 | 300 | 0 | 0 |
| 14 | CAN | Utako Wakamatsu / Jean-Sebastien Fecteau | 2650 | 2005/2006 season (100%) | 805 | 350 | 275 | 0 | 0 |
| 14 | CAN | Utako Wakamatsu / Jean-Sebastien Fecteau | 2650 | 2004/2005 season (70%) | 595 | 210 | 0 | 0 | 0 |
| 15 | USA | Julia Vlassov / Drew Meekins | 2588 | 2006/2007 season (100%) | 0 | 300 | 275 | 100 | 0 |
| 15 | USA | Julia Vlassov / Drew Meekins | 2588 | 2005/2006 season (100%) | 715 | 550 | 225 | 0 | 0 |
| 15 | USA | Julia Vlassov / Drew Meekins | 2588 | 2004/2005 season (70%) | 333 | 315 | 175 | 0 | 0 |
| 16 | CAN | Elizabeth Putnam / Sean Wirtz | 2560 | 2006/2007 season (100%) | 0 | 325 | 325 | 0 | 0 |
| 16 | CAN | Elizabeth Putnam / Sean Wirtz | 2560 | 2005/2006 season (100%) | 770 | 325 | 300 | 0 | 0 |
| 16 | CAN | Elizabeth Putnam / Sean Wirtz | 2560 | 2004/2005 season (70%) | 515 | 210 | 158 | 0 | 0 |
| 17 | RUS | Ksenia Krasilnikova / Konstantin Bezmaternikh | 2560 | 2006/2007 season (100%) | 655 | 550 | 250 | 0 | 0 |
| 17 | RUS | Ksenia Krasilnikova / Konstantin Bezmaternikh | 2560 | 2005/2006 season (100%) | 655 | 225 | 225 | 0 | 0 |
| 17 | RUS | Ksenia Krasilnikova / Konstantin Bezmaternikh | 2560 | 2004/2005 season (70%) | 0 | 123 | 88 | 0 | 0 |
| 18 | USA | Bridget Namiotka / John Coughlin | 2475 | 2006/2007 season (100%) | 625 | 350 | 225 | 0 | 0 |
| 18 | USA | Bridget Namiotka / John Coughlin | 2475 | 2005/2006 season (100%) | 625 | 400 | 250 | 0 | 0 |
| 18 | USA | Bridget Namiotka / John Coughlin | 2475 | 2004/2005 season (70%) | 0 | 0 | 0 | 0 | 0 |
| 19 | UKR | Tatiana Volosozhar / Stanislav Morozov | 2330 | 2006/2007 season (100%) | 1050 | 0 | 0 | 100 | 0 |
| 19 | UKR | Tatiana Volosozhar / Stanislav Morozov | 2330 | 2005/2006 season (100%) | 750 | 0 | 0 | 150 | 0 |
| 19 | UKR | Tatiana Volosozhar / Stanislav Morozov | 2330 | 2004/2005 season (70%) | 525 | 210 | 0 | 70 | 0 |
| 20 | CAN | Anabelle Langlois / Cody Hay | 2165 | 2006/2007 season (100%) | 750 | 325 | 0 | 0 | 0 |
| 20 | CAN | Anabelle Langlois / Cody Hay | 2165 | 2005/2006 season (100%) | 665 | 325 | 0 | 100 | 0 |
| 20 | CAN | Anabelle Langlois / Cody Hay | 2165 | 2004/2005 season (70%) | 0 | 0 | 0 | 0 | 0 |
| 21 | SWE | Angelika Pylkina / Niklas Hogner | 2120 | 2006/2007 season (100%) | 500 | 225 | 225 | 50 | 0 |
| 21 | SWE | Angelika Pylkina / Niklas Hogner | 2120 | 2005/2006 season (100%) | 595 | 275 | 250 | 0 | 0 |
| 21 | SWE | Angelika Pylkina / Niklas Hogner | 2120 | 2004/2005 season (70%) | 417 | 140 | 140 | 0 | 0 |
| 22 | USA | Brooke Castile / Benjamin Okolski | 2036 | 2006/2007 season (100%) | 700 | 0 | 0 | 150 | 0 |
| 22 | USA | Brooke Castile / Benjamin Okolski | 2036 | 2005/2006 season (100%) | 0 | 275 | 225 | 0 | 0 |
| 22 | USA | Brooke Castile / Benjamin Okolski | 2036 | 2004/2005 season (70%) | 441 | 140 | 105 | 0 | 0 |
| 23 | UZB | Marina Aganina / Artem Knyazev | 1890 | 2006/2007 season (100%) | 595 | 0 | 0 | 0 | 0 |
| 23 | UZB | Marina Aganina / Artem Knyazev | 1890 | 2005/2006 season (100%) | 595 | 275 | 250 | 0 | 0 |
| 23 | UZB | Marina Aganina / Artem Knyazev | 1890 | 2004/2005 season (70%) | 417 | 175 | 0 | 0 | 0 |
| 24 | FRA | Marylin Pla / Yannick Bonheur | 1818 | 2006/2007 season (100%) | 595 | 0 | 0 | 0 | 0 |
| 24 | FRA | Marylin Pla / Yannick Bonheur | 1818 | 2005/2006 season (100%) | 665 | 225 | 0 | 0 | 0 |
| 24 | FRA | Marylin Pla / Yannick Bonheur | 1818 | 2004/2005 season (70%) | 441 | 175 | 158 | 0 | 0 |
| 25 | POL | Dominika Piatkowska / Dmitri Khromin | 1650 | 2006/2007 season (100%) | 600 | 275 | 225 | 0 | 0 |
| 25 | POL | Dominika Piatkowska / Dmitri Khromin | 1650 | 2005/2006 season (100%) | 550 | 0 | 0 | 0 | 0 |
| 25 | POL | Dominika Piatkowska / Dmitri Khromin | 1650 | 2004/2005 season (70%) | 0 | 0 | 0 | 0 | 0 |
| 26 | CHN | Jiaqi Li / Jiankun Xu | 1625 | 2006/2007 season (100%) | 445 | 300 | 250 | 0 | 0 |
| 26 | CHN | Jiaqi Li / Jiankun Xu | 1625 | 2005/2006 season (100%) | 630 | 0 | 0 | 0 | 0 |
| 26 | CHN | Jiaqi Li / Jiankun Xu | 1625 | 2004/2005 season (70%) | 0 | 0 | 0 | 0 | 0 |
| 27 | RUS | Elena Efaieva / Alexei Menshikov | 1591 | 2006/2007 season (100%) | 665 | 250 | 0 | 0 | 0 |
| 27 | RUS | Elena Efaieva / Alexei Menshikov | 1591 | 2005/2006 season (100%) | 0 | 0 | 0 | 0 | 0 |
| 27 | RUS | Elena Efaieva / Alexei Menshikov | 1591 | 2004/2005 season (70%) | 396 | 140 | 140 | 0 | 0 |
| 28 | RUS | Ekaterina Vasilieva / Alexander Smirnov | 1590 | 2006/2007 season (100%) | 800 | 0 | 0 | 0 | 0 |
| 28 | RUS | Ekaterina Vasilieva / Alexander Smirnov | 1590 | 2005/2006 season (100%) | 565 | 225 | 0 | 0 | 0 |
| 28 | RUS | Ekaterina Vasilieva / Alexander Smirnov | 1590 | 2004/2005 season (70%) | 0 | 0 | 0 | 0 | 0 |
| 29 | GER | Rebecca Handke / Daniel Wende | 1589 | 2006/2007 season (100%) | 455 | 0 | 0 | 0 | 0 |
| 29 | GER | Rebecca Handke / Daniel Wende | 1589 | 2005/2006 season (100%) | 595 | 250 | 225 | 0 | 0 |
| 29 | GER | Rebecca Handke / Daniel Wende | 1589 | 2004/2005 season (70%) | 466 | 53 | 0 | 0 | 0 |
| 30 | GBR | Stacey Kemp / David King | 1580 | 2006/2007 season (100%) | 700 | 250 | 0 | 0 | 0 |
| 30 | GBR | Stacey Kemp / David King | 1580 | 2005/2006 season (100%) | 490 | 0 | 0 | 0 | 0 |
| 30 | GBR | Stacey Kemp / David King | 1580 | 2004/2005 season (70%) | 291 | 105 | 35 | 0 | 0 |

==== Ice dance (30 couples) ====
As of 24 March 2007

| Rank | Nation | Couple | Points | Season | ISU Championships or Olympics | (Junior) Grand Prix and Final | | Selected International Competition | |
| Rank | Nation | Couple | Points | Season | Best | Best | 2nd Best | Best | 2nd Best |
|---|---|---|---|---|---|---|---|---|---|
| 1 | CAN | Marie-France Dubreuil / Patrice Lauzon | 4570 | 2006/2007 season (100%) | 1150 | 750 | 400 | 0 | 0 |
| 1 | CAN | Marie-France Dubreuil / Patrice Lauzon | 4570 | 2005/2006 season (100%) | 1150 | 700 | 400 | 0 | 0 |
| 1 | CAN | Marie-France Dubreuil / Patrice Lauzon | 4570 | 2004/2005 season (70%) | 630 | 420 | 263 | 0 | 0 |
| 2 | BUL | Albena Denkova / Maxim Staviski | 4465 | 2006/2007 season (100%) | 1200 | 800 | 400 | 0 | 0 |
| 2 | BUL | Albena Denkova / Maxim Staviski | 4465 | 2005/2006 season (100%) | 1200 | 375 | 0 | 0 | 0 |
| 2 | BUL | Albena Denkova / Maxim Staviski | 4465 | 2004/2005 season (70%) | 700 | 490 | 280 | 0 | 0 |
| 3 | RUS | Oksana Domnina / Maxim Shabalin | 4100 | 2006/2007 season (100%) | 1000 | 700 | 400 | 150 | 0 |
| 3 | RUS | Oksana Domnina / Maxim Shabalin | 4100 | 2005/2006 season (100%) | 900 | 600 | 350 | 0 | 0 |
| 3 | RUS | Oksana Domnina / Maxim Shabalin | 4100 | 2004/2005 season (70%) | 595 | 228 | 228 | 0 | 0 |
| 4 | FRA | Isabelle Delobel / Olivier Schoenfelder | 4060 | 2006/2007 season (100%) | 1050 | 650 | 375 | 0 | 0 |
| 4 | FRA | Isabelle Delobel / Olivier Schoenfelder | 4060 | 2005/2006 season (100%) | 1050 | 550 | 375 | 0 | 0 |
| 4 | FRA | Isabelle Delobel / Olivier Schoenfelder | 4060 | 2004/2005 season (70%) | 735 | 385 | 245 | 0 | 0 |
| 5 | USA | Tanith Belbin / Benjamin Agosto | 3950 | 2006/2007 season (100%) | 1100 | 400 | 375 | 0 | 0 |
| 5 | USA | Tanith Belbin / Benjamin Agosto | 3950 | 2005/2006 season (100%) | 1150 | 400 | 0 | 0 | 0 |
| 5 | USA | Tanith Belbin / Benjamin Agosto | 3950 | 2004/2005 season (70%) | 805 | 525 | 280 | 0 | 0 |
| 6 | CAN | Tessa Virtue / Scott Moir | 3405 | 2006/2007 season (100%) | 950 | 375 | 325 | 0 | 0 |
| 6 | CAN | Tessa Virtue / Scott Moir | 3405 | 2005/2006 season (100%) | 770 | 600 | 250 | 0 | 0 |
| 6 | CAN | Tessa Virtue / Scott Moir | 3405 | 2004/2005 season (70%) | 480 | 385 | 175 | 0 | 0 |
| 7 | ISR | Galit Chait / Sergei Sakhnovski | 3358 | 2006/2007 season (100%) | 0 | 0 | 0 | 0 | 0 |
| 7 | ISR | Galit Chait / Sergei Sakhnovski | 3358 | 2005/2006 season (100%) | 950 | 650 | 375 | 0 | 0 |
| 7 | ISR | Galit Chait / Sergei Sakhnovski | 3358 | 2004/2005 season (70%) | 665 | 455 | 263 | 0 | 0 |
| 8 | UKR | Elena Grushina / Ruslan Goncharov | 3283 | 2006/2007 season (100%) | 0 | 0 | 0 | 0 | 0 |
| 8 | UKR | Elena Grushina / Ruslan Goncharov | 3283 | 2005/2006 season (100%) | 1100 | 750 | 400 | 0 | 0 |
| 8 | UKR | Elena Grushina / Ruslan Goncharov | 3283 | 2004/2005 season (70%) | 770 | 263 | 0 | 0 | 0 |
| 9 | RUS | Jana Khokhlova / Sergei Novitski | 3180 | 2006/2007 season (100%) | 850 | 600 | 375 | 0 | 0 |
| 9 | RUS | Jana Khokhlova / Sergei Novitski | 3180 | 2005/2006 season (100%) | 650 | 325 | 275 | 0 | 0 |
| 9 | RUS | Jana Khokhlova / Sergei Novitski | 3180 | 2004/2005 season (70%) | 0 | 193 | 175 | 105 | 0 |
| 10 | USA | Melissa Gregory / Denis Petukhov | 3150 | 2006/2007 season (100%) | 750 | 550 | 375 | 0 | 0 |
| 10 | USA | Melissa Gregory / Denis Petukhov | 3150 | 2005/2006 season (100%) | 800 | 350 | 325 | 0 | 0 |
| 10 | USA | Melissa Gregory / Denis Petukhov | 3150 | 2004/2005 season (70%) | 564 | 228 | 228 | 0 | 0 |
| 11 | USA | Meryl Davis / Charlie White | 3005 | 2006/2007 season (100%) | 900 | 325 | 325 | 0 | 0 |
| 11 | USA | Meryl Davis / Charlie White | 3005 | 2005/2006 season (100%) | 655 | 550 | 250 | 0 | 0 |
| 11 | USA | Meryl Davis / Charlie White | 3005 | 2004/2005 season (70%) | 0 | 140 | 140 | 0 | 0 |
| 12 | ITA | Federica Faiella / Massimo Scali | 2975 | 2006/2007 season (100%) | 800 | 350 | 350 | 0 | 0 |
| 12 | ITA | Federica Faiella / Massimo Scali | 2975 | 2005/2006 season (100%) | 850 | 350 | 275 | 0 | 0 |
| 12 | ITA | Federica Faiella / Massimo Scali | 2975 | 2004/2005 season (70%) | 560 | 245 | 210 | 0 | 0 |
| 13 | USA | Morgan Matthews / Maxim Zavozin | 2776 | 2006/2007 season (100%) | 0 | 325 | 275 | 100 | 0 |
| 13 | USA | Morgan Matthews / Maxim Zavozin | 2776 | 2005/2006 season (100%) | 805 | 325 | 300 | 0 | 0 |
| 13 | USA | Morgan Matthews / Maxim Zavozin | 2776 | 2004/2005 season (70%) | 501 | 420 | 175 | 0 | 0 |
| 14 | GBR | Sinead Kerr / John Kerr | 2685 | 2006/2007 season (100%) | 700 | 325 | 300 | 150 | 0 |
| 14 | GBR | Sinead Kerr / John Kerr | 2685 | 2005/2006 season (100%) | 750 | 250 | 0 | 0 | 0 |
| 14 | GBR | Sinead Kerr / John Kerr | 2685 | 2004/2005 season (70%) | 455 | 210 | 210 | 0 | 0 |
| 15 | ITA | Anna Cappellini / Luca Lanotte | 2625 | 2006/2007 season (100%) | 600 | 300 | 225 | 150 | 0 |
| 15 | ITA | Anna Cappellini / Luca Lanotte | 2625 | 2005/2006 season (100%) | 625 | 500 | 225 | 0 | 0 |
| 15 | ITA | Anna Cappellini / Luca Lanotte | 2625 | 2004/2005 season (70%) | 0 | 0 | 0 | 0 | 0 |
| 16 | AZE | Kristin Fraser / Igor Lukanin | 2550 | 2006/2007 season (100%) | 630 | 250 | 0 | 150 | 0 |
| 16 | AZE | Kristin Fraser / Igor Lukanin | 2550 | 2005/2006 season (100%) | 560 | 325 | 325 | 100 | 0 |
| 16 | AZE | Kristin Fraser / Igor Lukanin | 2550 | 2004/2005 season (70%) | 420 | 210 | 193 | 0 | 0 |
| 17 | FRA | Nathalie Pechalat / Fabian Bourzat | 2350 | 2006/2007 season (100%) | 650 | 350 | 250 | 0 | 0 |
| 17 | FRA | Nathalie Pechalat / Fabian Bourzat | 2350 | 2005/2006 season (100%) | 500 | 300 | 300 | 0 | 0 |
| 17 | FRA | Nathalie Pechalat / Fabian Bourzat | 2350 | 2004/2005 season (70%) | 318 | 175 | 158 | 0 | 0 |
| 18 | RUS | Natalia Mikhailova / Arkadi Sergeev | 2342 | 2006/2007 season (100%) | 0 | 225 | 0 | 0 | 0 |
| 18 | RUS | Natalia Mikhailova / Arkadi Sergeev | 2342 | 2005/2006 season (100%) | 685 | 450 | 250 | 0 | 0 |
| 18 | RUS | Natalia Mikhailova / Arkadi Sergeev | 2342 | 2004/2005 season (70%) | 417 | 315 | 175 | 0 | 0 |
| 19 | RUS | Anastasia Platonova / Andrei Maximishin | 2336 | 2006/2007 season (100%) | 0 | 300 | 0 | 100 | 100 |
| 19 | RUS | Anastasia Platonova / Andrei Maximishin | 2336 | 2005/2006 season (100%) | 595 | 350 | 250 | 0 | 0 |
| 19 | RUS | Anastasia Platonova / Andrei Maximishin | 2336 | 2004/2005 season (70%) | 396 | 245 | 175 | 0 | 0 |
| 20 | JPN | Nozomi Watanabe / Akiyuki Kido | 2240 | 2006/2007 season (100%) | 500 | 300 | 250 | 150 | 0 |
| 20 | JPN | Nozomi Watanabe / Akiyuki Kido | 2240 | 2005/2006 season (100%) | 500 | 300 | 225 | 0 | 0 |
| 20 | JPN | Nozomi Watanabe / Akiyuki Kido | 2240 | 2004/2005 season (70%) | 515 | 158 | 158 | 0 | 0 |
| 21 | EST | Grethe Grünberg / Kristian Rand | 2185 | 2006/2007 season (100%) | 685 | 400 | 250 | 0 | 0 |
| 21 | EST | Grethe Grünberg / Kristian Rand | 2185 | 2005/2006 season (100%) | 475 | 200 | 175 | 0 | 0 |
| 21 | EST | Grethe Grünberg / Kristian Rand | 2185 | 2004/2005 season (70%) | 206 | 88 | 35 | 0 | 0 |
| 22 | RUS | Ekaterina Bobrova / Dmitri Soloviev | 1990 | 2006/2007 season (100%) | 715 | 500 | 250 | 0 | 0 |
| 22 | RUS | Ekaterina Bobrova / Dmitri Soloviev | 1990 | 2005/2006 season (100%) | 0 | 300 | 225 | 0 | 0 |
| 22 | RUS | Ekaterina Bobrova / Dmitri Soloviev | 1990 | 2004/2005 season (70%) | 0 | 0 | 0 | 0 | 0 |
| 23 | CAN | Lauren Senft / Leif Gislason | 1960 | 2006/2007 season (100%) | 665 | 250 | 225 | 0 | 0 |
| 23 | CAN | Lauren Senft / Leif Gislason | 1960 | 2005/2006 season (100%) | 0 | 225 | 0 | 0 | 0 |
| 23 | CAN | Lauren Senft / Leif Gislason | 1960 | 2004/2005 season (70%) | 490 | 105 | 0 | 0 | 0 |
| 24 | HUN | Nora Hoffmann / Attila Elek | 1840 | 2006/2007 season (100%) | 0 | 300 | 275 | 0 | 0 |
| 24 | HUN | Nora Hoffmann / Attila Elek | 1840 | 2005/2006 season (100%) | 455 | 250 | 0 | 0 | 0 |
| 24 | HUN | Nora Hoffmann / Attila Elek | 1840 | 2004/2005 season (70%) | 368 | 192 | 175 | 0 | 0 |
| 25 | USA | Trina Pratt / Todd Gilles | 1784 | 2006/2007 season (100%) | 0 | 250 | 0 | 0 | 0 |
| 25 | USA | Trina Pratt / Todd Gilles | 1784 | 2005/2006 season (100%) | 565 | 250 | 225 | 0 | 0 |
| 25 | USA | Trina Pratt / Todd Gilles | 1784 | 2004/2005 season (70%) | 354 | 140 | 140 | 0 | 0 |
| 26 | FRA | Elodie Brouiller / Benoit Richaud | 1740 | 2006/2007 season (100%) | 535 | 300 | 225 | 0 | 0 |
| 26 | FRA | Elodie Brouiller / Benoit Richaud | 1740 | 2005/2006 season (100%) | 355 | 175 | 150 | 0 | 0 |
| 26 | FRA | Elodie Brouiller / Benoit Richaud | 1740 | 2004/2005 season (70%) | 0 | 0 | 0 | 0 | 0 |
| 27 | GER | Christina Beier / William Beier | 1645 | 2006/2007 season (100%) | 0 | 0 | 0 | 0 | 0 |
| 27 | GER | Christina Beier / William Beier | 1645 | 2005/2006 season (100%) | 600 | 275 | 250 | 50 | 50 |
| 27 | GER | Christina Beier / William Beier | 1645 | 2004/2005 season (70%) | 245 | 175 | 0 | 0 | 0 |
| 28 | ARM | Anastasia Grebenkina / Vazgen Azrojan | 1553 | 2006/2007 season (100%) | 385 | 275 | 0 | 0 | 0 |
| 28 | ARM | Anastasia Grebenkina / Vazgen Azrojan | 1553 | 2005/2006 season (100%) | 385 | 350 | 0 | 0 | 0 |
| 28 | ARM | Anastasia Grebenkina / Vazgen Azrojan | 1553 | 2004/2005 season (70%) | 343 | 158 | 0 | 0 | 0 |
| 29 | CHN | Xintong Huang / Xun Zheng | 1513 | 2006/2007 season (100%) | 595 | 0 | 0 | 0 | 0 |
| 29 | CHN | Xintong Huang / Xun Zheng | 1513 | 2005/2006 season (100%) | 525 | 150 | 50 | 0 | 0 |
| 29 | CHN | Xintong Huang / Xun Zheng | 1513 | 2004/2005 season (70%) | 227 | 105 | 88 | 0 | 0 |
| 30 | USA | Emily Samuelson / Evan Bates | 1470 | 2006/2007 season (100%) | 0 | 550 | 250 | 0 | 0 |
| 30 | USA | Emily Samuelson / Evan Bates | 1470 | 2005/2006 season (100%) | 445 | 150 | 75 | 0 | 0 |
| 30 | USA | Emily Samuelson / Evan Bates | 1470 | 2004/2005 season (70%) | 0 | 0 | 0 | 0 | 0 |

== See also ==
- ISU World Standings
- 2006–07 figure skating season
