= ISU Junior Grand Prix in the Czech Republic =

International figure skating competition

- Status: Inactive
- Genre: ISU Junior Grand Prix
- Frequency: Occasional
- Venue: Ostravar Aréna
- Location: Ostrava
- Country: Czech Republic
- Inaugurated: 1999
- Most recent: 2024
- Organizer: Czech Figure Skating Association

The ISU Junior Grand Prix in the Czech Republic – also known as the Czech Skate – is an international figure skating competition sanctioned by the International Skating Union (ISU), organized and hosted by the Czech Figure Skating Association (Czech: Český krasobruslařský svaz). It is held periodically as an event of the ISU Junior Grand Prix of Figure Skating (JGP), a series of international competitions exclusively for junior-level skaters. Since 2008, it has been held at the Ostravar Aréna in Ostrava. Medals may be awarded in men's singles, women's singles, pair skating, and ice dance. Skaters earn points based on their results at the qualifying competitions each season, and the top skaters or teams in each discipline are invited to then compete at the Junior Grand Prix of Figure Skating Final.

== History ==
The ISU Junior Grand Prix of Figure Skating (JGP) was established by the International Skating Union (ISU) in 1997 and consists of a series of seven international figure skating competitions exclusively for junior-level skaters. The locations of the Junior Grand Prix events change every year. While all seven competitions feature the men's, women's, and ice dance events, only four competitions each season feature the pairs event. Skaters earn points based on their results each season, and the top skaters or teams in each discipline are then invited to compete at the Junior Grand Prix of Figure Skating Final.

Skaters are eligible to compete on the junior-level circuit if they are at least 13 years old before 1 July of the respective season, but not yet 19 (for single skaters), 21 (for men and women in ice dance and women in pair skating), or 23 (for men in pair skating). Competitors are chosen by their respective skating federations. The number of entries allotted to each ISU member nation in each discipline is determined by their results at the prior World Junior Figure Skating Championships.

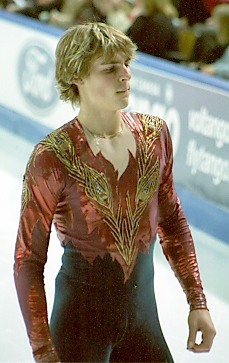
Fedor Andreev of Canada, the men's champion at the inaugural Czech Skate

The Czech Republic hosted its first Junior Grand Prix competition – also known as the Czech Skate – in 1999 in Ostrava. Fedor Andreev and Marianne Dubuc, both of Canada, won the men's and women's events, respectively. Julia Shapiro and Alexei Sokolov of Russia won the pairs event, and Kristina Kobaladze and Oleg Voyko of Ukraine won the ice dance event.

The Czech Republic hosted the 2005 Junior Grand Prix of Figure Skating Final – the culminating event of the Junior Grand Prix series – in Ostrava. Takahiko Kozuka of Japan won the men's event, Yuna Kim of South Korea won the women's event, Valeria Simakova and Anton Tokarev of Russia won the pairs event, and Tessa Virtue and Scott Moir of Canada won the ice dance event.

The ISU officially cancelled all scheduled Junior Grand Prix events for the 2020–21 season, which included the 2020 Czech Skate, due to the COVID-19 pandemic, citing increased travel and entry requirements between countries and potentially excessive sanitary and health care costs for those hosting competitions.

== Medalists ==
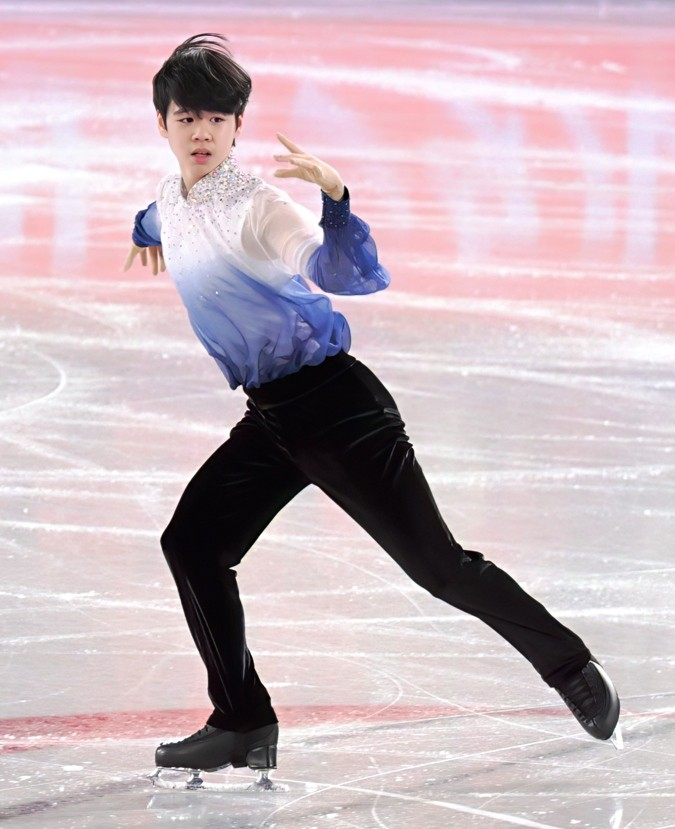
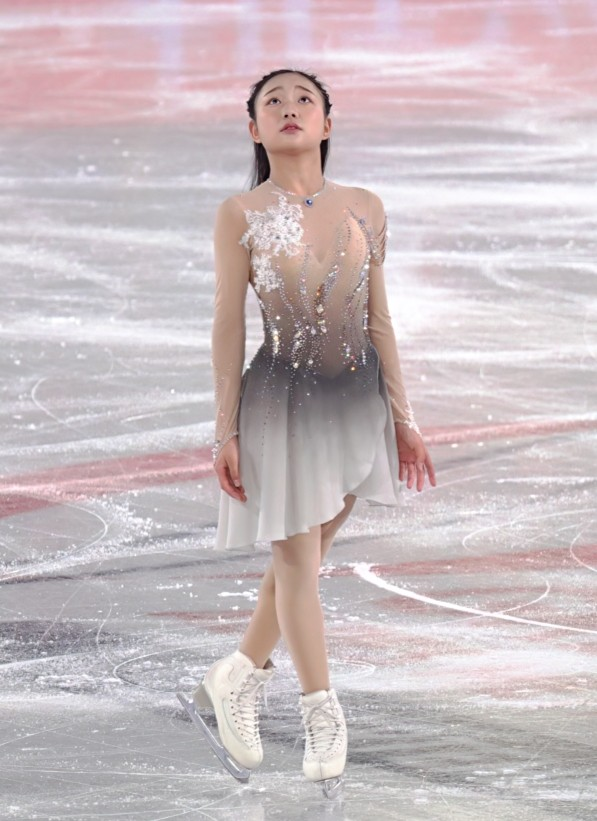
The 2024 Czech Skate champions: Seo Min-kyu of South Korea (men's singles) and Kaoruko Wada of Japan (women's singles).
Not pictured: Zhang Xuanqi and Feng Wenqiang of China (pair skating); and Célina Fradji and Jean-Hans Fourneaux of Canada (ice dance)

=== Men's singles ===
Men's event medalists
Year	Location	Gold	Silver	Bronze	Ref.
1999	Ostrava	(Canada) Fedor Andreev	(Czech Republic) Lukáš Rakowski	(Russia) Valery Medvedev	
2000	Ostrava	(United States) Parker Pennington	(Russia) Sergei Dobrin	(Canada) Nicholas Young	
2001	Ostrava	(Russia) Andrei Griazev	(Belgium) Kevin van der Perren	(France) Damien Djordjevic	
2003	Ostrava	(Czech Republic) Tomáš Verner	(Russia) Sergei Dobrin	(Russia) Alexander Uspenski	
2005 Final	Ostrava	(Japan) Takahiko Kozuka	(United States) Austin Kanallakan	(United States) Geoffrey Varner	
2006	Liberec	(United States) Tommy Steenberg	(Japan) Tatsuki Machida	(Czech Republic) Pavel Kaška	
2008	Ostrava	(United States) Alexander Johnson	(Russia) Ivan Bariev	(Japan) Akio Sasaki	
2010	Ostrava	(China) Yan Han	(Russia) Artur Dmitriev Jr	(Sweden) Alexander Majorov	
2013	Ostrava	(Japan) Keiji Tanaka	(Russia) Alexander Petrov	(Russia) Morisi Kvitelashvili	
2014	Ostrava	(Canada) Roman Sadovsky	(Russia) Alexander Samarin	(Japan) Sei Kawahara	
2016	Ostrava	(Russia) Dmitri Aliev	(United States) Alexei Krasnozhon	(Russia) Roman Savosin	
2018	Ostrava	(Russia) Andrei Mozalev	(United States) Camden Pulkinen	(Canada) Joseph Phan	
2020	Ostrava	Competition cancelled due to the COVID-19 pandemic			
2022	Ostrava	(Japan) Nozomu Yoshioka	(Italy) Nikolaj Memola	(Sweden) Andreas Nordebäck	
2024	Ostrava	(South Korea) Seo Min-kyu	(United States) Patrick Blackwell	(Slovakia) Adam Hagara	

=== Women's singles ===
Women's event medalists
Year	Location	Gold	Silver	Bronze	Ref.
1999	Ostrava	(Canada) Marianne Dubuc	(United States) Elizabeth Kwon	(Japan) Utako Wakamatsu	
2000	Ostrava	(Switzerland) Sarah Meier	(Hungary) Tamara Dorofejev	(United States) Yebin Mok	
2001	Ostrava	(Japan) Miki Ando	(Russia) Tatiana Basova	(Japan) Akiko Suzuki	
2003	Ostrava	(Czech Republic) Lucie Krausová	(Russia) Olga Naidenova	(Japan) Akiko Kitamura	
2005 Final	Ostrava	(South Korea) Yuna Kim	(Japan) Aki Sawada	(China) Xu Binshu	
2006	Liberec	(United States) Megan Oster	(Estonia) Svetlana Issakova	(Estonia) Jelena Glebova	
2008	Ostrava	(Japan) Yukiko Fujisawa	(United States) Angela Maxwell	(Italy) Stefania Berton	
2010	Ostrava	(United States) Vanessa Lam	(Japan) Risa Shoji	(Russia) Polina Shelepen	
2013	Ostrava	(Russia) Alexandra Proklova	(Russia) Maria Sotskova	(United States) Amber Glenn	
2014	Ostrava	(Russia) Evgenia Medvedeva	(Japan) Wakaba Higuchi	(United States) Karen Chen	
2016	Ostrava	(Russia) Anastasiia Gubanova	(Japan) Rika Kihira	(Russia) Alisa Lozko	
2018	Ostrava	(Russia) Alena Kostornaia	(South Korea) Kim Ye-lim	(Russia) Viktoria Vasilieva	
2020	Ostrava	Competition cancelled due to the COVID-19 pandemic			
2022	Ostrava	(Japan) Mao Shimada	(South Korea) Kwon Min-sol	(Japan) Ikura Kushida	
2024	Ostrava	(Japan) Kaoruko Wada	(France) Stefania Gladki	(South Korea) Kim Yu-jae	

=== Pairs ===
Pairs event medalists
Year	Location	Gold	Silver	Bronze	Ref.
1999	Ostrava	(Russia); Julia Shapiro; Alexei Sokolov	(United States); Larisa Spielberg; Craig Joeright	(United States); Megan Sierk; Dustin Sierk	
2000	Ostrava	(United States); Sima Ganaba; Amir Ganaba	(Slovakia); Diana Rišková; Vladimir Futáš	(Russia); Alena Maltseva; Oleg Popov	
2001	Ostrava	(Russia); Maria Mukhortova; Pavel Lebedev	(Russia); Anastasia Kuzmina; Stanislav Evdokimov	(Ukraine); Tatiana Volosozhar; Petro Kharchenko	
2003	Ostrava	(Russia); Maria Mukhortova; Maxim Trankov	(Ukraine); Tatiana Volosozhar; Petro Kharchenko	(Russia); Arina Ushakova; Alexander Popov	
2005 Final	Ostrava	(Russia); Valeria Simakova; Anton Tokarev	(United States); Julia Vlassov; Drew Meekins	(United States); Mariel Miller; Rockne Brubaker	
2006	Liberec	(Russia); Ksenia Krasilnikova; Konstantin Bezmaternikh	(United States); Kendra Moyle; Andy Seitz	(United States); Bridget Namiotka; John Coughlin	
2008	Ostrava	(Russia); Lubov Iliushechkina; Nodari Maisuradze	(Russia); Sabina Imaikina; Andrei Novoselov	(Russia); Ksenia Ozerova; Alexander Enbert	
2010	Ostrava	(China); Yu Xiaoyu; Jin Yang	(United States); Ashley Cain; Joshua Reagan	(Canada); Natasha Purich; Raymond Schultz	
2013	Ostrava	(Russia); Lina Fedorova; Maxim Miroshkin	(Russia); Arina Cherniavskaia; Antonio Souza-Kordeyru	(Russia); Kamilla Gainetdinova; Ivan Bich	
2014	Ostrava	(Canada); Julianne Séguin; Charlie Bilodeau	(Russia); Lina Fedorova; Maxim Miroshkin	(Russia); Kamilla Gainetdinova; Sergei Alexeev	
2016	Ostrava	(Czech Republic); Anna Dušková; Martin Bidař	(Russia); Amina Atakhanova; Ilia Spiridonov	(United States); Chelsea Liu; Brian Johnson	
2018	Ostrava	(Russia); Kseniia Akhanteva; Valerii Kolesov	(Russia); Polina Kostiukovich; Dmitrii Ialin	(United States); Sarah Feng; TJ Nyman	
2020	Ostrava	Competition cancelled due to the COVID-19 pandemic			
2022	Ostrava	(United States); Sophia Baram; Daniel Tioumentsev	(United States); Cayla Smith; Andy Deng	(Canada); Chloe Panetta; Kieran Thrasher	
2024	Ostrava	(China); Zhang Xuanqi; Feng Wenqiang	(France); Romane Télémaque; Lucas Coulon	(Canada); Julia Quattrocchi; Simon Desmarais	

=== Ice dance ===
At the 2022 Czech Skate, Kateřina Mrázková and Daniel Mrázek won the first ever Junior Grand Prix title in ice dance for the Czech Republic, outscoring silver medalists Phebe Bekker and James Hernandez of Great Britain by almost seventeen points. Bekker and Hernandez won the first ever Junior Grand Prix medal in ice dance for Great Britain, while bronze medalists Nao Kida and Masaya Morita won the first ever Junior Grand Prix medal in ice dance for Japan.

Ice dance event medalists
Year	Location	Gold	Silver	Bronze	Ref.
1999	Ostrava	(Ukraine); Kristina Kobaladze; Oleg Voyko	(Russia); Julia Golovina; Denis Egorov	(Czech Republic); Lucie Kadlčáková; Hynek Bílek	
2000	Ostrava	(Russia); Elena Khaliavina; Maxim Shabalin	(Ukraine); Viktoria Polzykina; Alexander Shakalov	(Czech Republic); Lucie Kadlčáková; Hynek Bílek	
2001	Ostrava	(Ukraine); Julia Golovina; Oleg Voyko	(Russia); Oksana Domnina; Maxim Bolotin	(France); Amandine Borsi; Fabrice Blondel	
2003	Ostrava	(Ukraine); Anna Zadorozhniuk; Sergei Verbillo	(Russia); Olga Orlova; Maxim Bolotin	(Czech Republic); Petra Pachlová; Petr Knoth	
2005 Final	Ostrava	(Canada); Tessa Virtue; Scott Moir	(United States); Meryl Davis; Charlie White	(Italy); Anna Cappellini; Luca Lanotte	
2006	Liberec	(Russia); Julia Zlobina; Alexei Sitnikov	(Italy); Camilla Spelta; Marco Garavaglia	(Canada); Kaitlyn Weaver; Andrew Poje	
2008	Ostrava	(United States); Piper Gilles; Zachary Donohue	(Russia); Marina Antipova; Artem Kudashev	(Canada); Karen Routhier; Eric Saucke-Lacelle	
2010	Ostrava	(Russia); Ekaterina Pushkash; Jonathan Guerreiro	(France); Tiffany Zahorski; Alexis Miart	(Ukraine); Anastasia Galyeta; Oleksii Shumskyi	
2013	Ostrava	(Russia); Betina Popova; Yuri Vlasenko	(United States); Rachel Parsons; Michael Parsons	(Canada); Madeline Edwards; Zhao Kai Pang	
2014	Ostrava	(Canada); Mackenzie Bent; Garrett MacKeen	(Russia); Betina Popova; Yuri Vlasenko	(United States); Lorraine McNamara; Quinn Carpenter	
2016	Ostrava	(United States); Lorraine McNamara; Quinn Carpenter	(Czech Republic); Nicole Kuzmichová; Alexandr Sinicyn	(Russia); Arina Ushakova; Maxim Nekrasov	
2018	Ostrava	(Russia); Elizaveta Khudaiberdieva; Nikita Nazarov	(Georgia (country)); Maria Kazakova; Georgy Reviya	(Russia); Diana Davis; Gleb Smolkin	
2020	Ostrava	Competition cancelled due to the COVID-19 pandemic			
2022	Ostrava	(Czech Republic); Kateřina Mrázková; Daniel Mrázek	(United Kingdom); Phebe Bekker; James Hernandez	(Japan); Nao Kida; Masaya Morita	
2024	Ostrava	(France); Célina Fradji; Jean-Hans Fourneaux	(United States); Katarina Wolfkostin; Dimitry Tsarevski	(Canada); Layla Veillon; Alexander Brandys	
