= 2006 World Junior Figure Skating Championships =

- Type: ISU Championship
- Date: March 6 – 12
- Season: 2005–06
- Location: Ljubljana, Slovenia
- Venue: Halla Tivoli

Champions
- Men's singles: (Japan) Takahiko Kozuka
- Ladies' singles: (South Korea) Kim Yuna
- Pairs: (United States) Julia Vlassov / Drew Meekins
- Ice dance: (Canada) Tessa Virtue / Scott Moir
- Previous: 2005 World Junior Championships
- Next: 2007 World Junior Championships

The 2006 World Junior Figure Skating Championships were held in Ljubljana, Slovenia from March 6 to 12. Skaters competed in four disciplines: men's singles, ladies' singles, pair skating, and ice dancing.

The event was open to figure skaters from ISU member nations who on July 1, 2005, had reached the age of 13 but had not yet turned 19 (or 21 for male pair skaters and ice dancers).

The term "Junior" refers to the age level rather than the skill level. Therefore, some of the skaters competing had competed nationally and internationally at the senior level, but were still age-eligible for Junior Worlds.

The compulsory dance was the Austrian Waltz. Due to the large number of participants, the men's and ladies' qualifying groups were split into groups A and B. Scores did not carry over from qualifying.

== Medals table ==
Rank	Nation	Gold	Silver	Bronze	Total
1	United States (USA)	1	1	2	4
2	Japan (JPN)	1	1	0	2
3	Canada (CAN)	1	0	0	1
3	South Korea (KOR)	1	0	0	1
5	Russia (RUS)	0	2	1	3
6	France (FRA)	0	0	1	1
Totals (6 entries)		4	4	4	12

== Results ==
=== Men ===
Rank	Name	Nation	Total points	QA		QB		SP		FS	
1	Takahiko Kozuka	Japan	180.05	3	107.52			2	60.07	1	119.98
2	Sergei Voronov	Russia	172.92	2	108.30			5	57.66	2	115.26
3	Yannick Ponsero	France	170.97			2	111.80	1	63.29	7	107.68
4	Stephen Carriere	United States	169.14			1	114.86	6	56.89	4	112.25
5	Takahito Mura	Japan	168.39	4	106.78			8	55.15	3	113.24
6	Patrick Chan	Canada	168.19			6	105.10	3	59.54	6	108.65
7	Kevin Reynolds	Canada	165.14	7	103.08			11	53.04	5	112.10
8	Alexander Uspenski	Russia	157.68	1	110.88			12	52.99	8	104.69
9	Geoffry Varner	United States	152.54	8	100.00			10	53.36	11	99.18
10	Yang Chao	China	152.48			7	103.52	7	56.52	14	95.96
11	Daisuke Murakami	United States	152.17	6	105.20			14	51.08	9	101.09
12	Ryo Shibata	Japan	151.01	5	106.20			9	55.08	15	95.93
13	Peter Liebers	Germany	150.33			3	111.30	4	57.67	17	92.66
14	Moris Pfeifhofer	Switzerland	150.21			4	107.10	13	51.47	12	98.74
15	Viktor Pfeifer	Austria	150.06			5	105.80	17	50.21	10	99.85
16	Adrian Schultheiss	Sweden	146.27			8	101.30	16	50.95	16	95.32
17	Kim Lucine	France	144.46	10	92.98			22	46.48	13	97.98
18	Guan Jinlin	China	141.87			10	88.70	19	49.21	18	92.66
19	Yannick Kocon	France	133.99			12	83.10	15	50.98	22	83.01
20	Pavel Kaška	Czech Republic	132.82			9	89.46	21	46.57	19	86.25
21	Luka Čadež	Slovenia	132.38			11	85.98	18	49.21	20	83.17
22	Mateusz Chruściński	Poland	128.25	14	82.90			20	46.94	23	81.31
23	David Richardson	Great Britain	125.97	13	87.50			24	42.95	21	83.02
24	Vitali Sazonets	Ukraine	119.89			13	76.06	23	45.81	24	74.08
Free skate not reached
25	Michael Chrolenko	Norway	—N/a	—N/a		15	67.56	25	42.40	—N/a	
26	Taras Rajec	Slovakia	—N/a	15	76.22	—N/a		26	40.15	—N/a	
27	Marco Fabbri	Italy	—N/a	11	92.78	—N/a		27	40.13	—N/a	
28	Alexandr Kazakov	Belarus	—N/a	9	95.90	—N/a		28	37.89	—N/a	
29	Valtter Virtanen	Finland	—N/a	12	92.36	—N/a		29	36.77	—N/a	
30	Georgi Kenchadze	Bulgaria	—N/a	—N/a		14	68.40	30	34.71	—N/a	
Short program not reached
31	Boris Martinec	Croatia	—N/a	16	64.62	—N/a		—N/a			
32	Tigran Vardanjan	Hungary	—N/a	17	61.94	—N/a		—N/a			
33	Evgeni Krasnapolski	Israel	—N/a	—N/a		16	61.76	—N/a			
34	Gegham Vardanyan	Armenia	—N/a	18	61.60	—N/a		—N/a			
35	Kutay Eryoldas	Turkey	—N/a	19	61.18	—N/a		—N/a			
36	Zoltan Kelemen	Romania	—N/a	—N/a		17	61.12	—N/a			
37	Robert Mcnamara	Australia	—N/a	—N/a		18	57.30	—N/a			
38	Manuel Legaz	Spain	—N/a	20	56.46	—N/a		—N/a			
39	Tatsuya Tanaka	Hong Kong	—N/a	—N/a		19	53.02	—N/a			
40	Egor Kocheev	Uzbekistan	—N/a	—N/a		20	41.80	—N/a			

=== Ladies ===
Rank	Name	Nation	Total points	QA		QB		SP		FS	
1	Kim Yuna	South Korea	177.54	1	107.52			1	60.86	1	116.68
2	Mao Asada	Japan	153.35			1	113.58	2	56.10	2	97.25
3	Christine Zukowski	United States	135.14	2	76.20			3	51.37	4	83.77
4	Nana Takeda	Japan	129.09			2	94.90	16	38.94	3	90.15
5	Aki Sawada	Japan	126.15			6	76.88	6	47.85	7	78.30
6	Alissa Czisny	United States	124.18			3	83.40	4	50.36	11	73.82
7	Kim Chae-hwa	South Korea	122.81			8	75.30	10	42.12	5	80.69
8	Jenni Vähämaa	Finland	121.88	5	71.46			9	42.76	6	79.12
9	Laura Lepistö	Finland	121.05	7	67.92			8	44.24	9	76.81
10	Katarina Gerboldt	Russia	120.90	6	70.40			7	45.78	10	75.12
11	Jelena Glebova	Estonia	118.26			7	76.32	12	40.42	8	77.84
12	Arina Martinova	Russia	116.39	3	73.98			5	49.96	18	66.43
13	Megan Hyatt	United States	113.82			4	82.46	13	40.11	12	73.71
14	Shin Yea-ji	South Korea	110.17	10	65.94			18	38.30	14	71.87
15	Amelie Lacoste	Canada	109.91			14	59.42	19	37.36	13	72.55
16	Astrid Mangi	Austria	108.15			13	59.52	14	39.85	16	68.30
17	Caterina Gabanella	Italy	105.79	12	61.38			20	37.33	15	68.46
18	Nella Simaová	Czech Republic	105.78			9	68.38	17	38.35	17	67.43
19	Isabelle Nylander	Sweden	102.83	4	73.34			11	42.05	22	60.78
20	Nadège Bobillier	France	102.75			11	65.36	21	36.53	19	66.22
21	Diane Szmiett	Canada	102.20			5	80.08	22	36.34	20	65.86
22	Radka Bártová	Slovakia	101.63	8	67.92			15	39.43	21	62.20
23	Laura Czarnotta	Poland	90.59	15	54.88			24	33.29	23	57.30
24	Bettina Heim	Switzerland	85.11			15	59.42	23	34.82	24	50.29
25	Daša Grm	Slovenia	73.21			17	53.44	31	27.48	25	45.73
Free skating not reached
26	Tina Wang	Australia		11	61.40			25	32.67		
27	Christiane Berger	Germany		14	58.46			26	32.06		
28	Jocelyn Ho	Chinese Taipei				12	60.58	27	29.77		
29	Guo Yalu	China		9	67.58			28	29.72		
30	Sonia Lafuente	Spain				10	65.82	29	29.25		
31	Kirsten Verbist	Belgium		13	60.70			30	27.62		
Short program not reached
	Victoria Muniz	Puerto Rico	NQD			16	57.68				
	Mia Brix	Denmark	NQD	16	53.82						
	Manuela Stanukova	Bulgaria	NQD	17	53.52						
	Julia Sheremet	Belarus	NQD			18	52.80				
	Emma Hagieva	Azerbaijan	NQD	18	52.18						
	Sharon Resseler	Netherlands	NQD			19	51.76				
	Rima Beliy	Israel	NQD			20	50.48				
	Bianka Padar	Hungary	NQD	19	49.88						
	Željka Krizmanić	Croatia	NQD	20	49.72						
	Emily Naphtal	Mexico	NQD	21	46.38						
	Tamami Ono	Hong Kong	NQD			21	46.32				
	Maria Balaba	Latvia	NQD	22	45.36						
	Rūta Gajauskaitė	Lithuania	NQD			22	45.06				
	Erle Harstad	Norway	NQD	23	44.92						
	Sonja Mugoša	Serbia and Montenegro	NQD			23	41.86				
	Megan Allely	South Africa	NQD	24	39.54						
	Roxana Boamfa	Romania	NQD			24	38.86				
	Gracielle Jeanne Tan	Philippines	NQD			25	38.50				
	Buse Coskun	Turkey	NQD	25	37.78						
	Ani Vardanyan	Armenia	NQD			26	35.72				
	Natalia Alexandra Mitsuoka	Argentina	NQD	26	34.40						
	Naida Akšamija	Bosnia and Herzegovina	NQD			27	27.42				

=== Pairs ===
Rank	Name	Nation	Total points	SP		FS	
1	Julia Vlassov / Drew Meekins	United States	138.05	4	45.44	1	92.61
2	Kendra Moyle / Andy Seitz	United States	133.50	1	48.47	4	85.03
3	Ksenia Krasilnikova / Konstantin Bezmaternikh	Russia	132.66	5	45.23	3	87.43
4	Bridget Namiotka / John Coughlin	United States	132.35	6	43.51	2	88.84
5	Angelika Pylkina / Niklas Hogner	Sweden	129.62	3	46.28	5	83.34
6	Ekaterina Vasilieva / Alexander Smirnov	Russia	127.31	2	48.11	7	79.20
7	Emilie Demers Boutin / Pierre-Philippe Joncas	Canada	121.31	7	40.64	6	80.67
8	Valene Maheu / Simon-Pierre Cote	Canada	113.56	8	40.26	8	73.30
9	Zhao Rui / An Yang	China	106.65	14	34.33	9	72.32
10	Amanda Ribeiro / Stuart Chutter	Canada	106.46	10	38.04	10	68.42
11	Julia Goreeva / Roman Talan	Ukraine	104.19	12	35.81	11	68.38
12	Victoria Kazantseva / Alexander Enbert	Russia	99.61	9	39.56	13	60.05
13	Aneta Michałek / Bartosz Paluchowski	Poland	98.20	13	34.34	12	63.86
14	An Ni / Wu Yiming	China	96.40	11	37.07	14	59.33
15	Kristína Kabátová / Martin Hanulák	Slovakia	87.84	15	30.31	15	57.53

=== Ice dancing ===
Rank	Name	Nation	Total points	CD		OD		FD	
1	Tessa Virtue / Scott Moir	Canada	172.57	1	34.88	1	55.13	1	82.56
2	Natalia Mikhailova / Arkadi Sergeev	Russia	168.41	2	34.65	2	55.01	3	78.75
3	Meryl Davis / Charlie White	United States	167.20	3	33.31	4	52.74	2	81.15
4	Anna Cappellini / Luca Lanotte	Italy	160.72	4	32.24	3	54.68	6	73.80
5	Anastasia Platonova / Andrei Maximishin	Russia	157.59	6	29.60	5	50.64	4	77.35
6	Trina Pratt / Todd Gilles	United States	150.16	7	28.59	6	47.46	5	74.11
7	Anastasia Gorshkova / Ilia Tkachenko	Russia	149.16	5	31.70	9	44.05	7	73.41
8	Allie Hann-McCurdy / Michael Coreno	Canada	139.55	9	27.89	7	45.48	9	66.18
9	Grethe Grunberg / Kristjan Rand	Estonia	139.40	8	28.56	8	44.21	8	66.63
10	Emily Samuelson / Evan Bates	United States	134.16	10	27.28	10	43.91	11	62.97
11	Huang Xintong / Zheng Xun	China	132.53	15	25.29	11	42.51	10	64.73
12	Joanna Budner / Jan Mościcki	Poland	129.20	12	25.69	12	41.65	12	61.86
13	Élodie Brouiller / Benoît Richaud	France	126.55	11	25.77	14	40.23	13	60.55
14	Camilla Spelta / Marco Garavaglia	Italy	123.25	14	25.37	17	38.45	14	59.43
15	Mylène Lamoureux / Michael Mee	Canada	121.97	13	25.55	13	41.33	17	55.09
16	Tanja Kolbe / Paul Boll	Germany	120.72	17	23.40	15	39.46	15	57.86
17	Krisztina Barta / Ádám Tóth	Hungary	117.94	18	22.19	16	38.51	16	57.24
18	Alina Saprykina / Pavlo Khimich	Ukraine	115.62	16	24.00	18	37.37	19	54.25
19	Lucie Myslivečková / Matěj Novák	Czech Republic	111.74	19	21.89	19	35.28	18	54.57
20	Leigh Rogers / Lloyd Jones	Great Britain	109.95	21	21.32	20	34.84	20	53.79
21	Ekaterina Zaikina / Otar Japaridze	Georgia	108.62	20	21.40	22	34.42	21	52.80
22	Barbora Heroldová / Zdeněk Pazdera	Czech Republic	105.31	24	19.84	21	34.70	22	50.77
23	Danielle O'Brien / Gregory Merriman	Australia	101.64	23	20.16	24	33.33	23	48.15
24	Anna Thomsen / Nikolaj Sorensen	Denmark	97.85	22	20.29	23	34.09	24	43.47
Free dance not reached
25	Nora von Bergen / Bris Raeber	Switzerland		25	19.68	25	32.66		
26	Maria Feoktsistava / Vitali Vakunov	Belarus		26	14.43	26	23.65		
