= 2005–06 ISU Junior Grand Prix =

- Type: ISU Junior Grand Prix
- Season: 2005–06
- Previous: 2004–05 ISU Junior Grand Prix
- Next: 2006–07 ISU Junior Grand Prix

The 2005–06 ISU Junior Grand Prix was the ninth season of the ISU Junior Grand Prix, a series of international junior level competitions organized by the International Skating Union. It was the junior-level complement to the Grand Prix of Figure Skating, which was for senior-level skaters. Skaters competed in the disciplines of men's singles, ladies' singles, pair skating, and ice dance. The top skaters from the series met at the Junior Grand Prix Final.

Skaters who reached the age of 13 by July 1, 2005 but had not turned 19 (singles and females of the other two disciplines) or 21 (male pair skaters and ice dancers) were eligible to compete on the junior circuit.

== Competitions ==
The locations of the JGP events change yearly. In the 2005–06 season, the series was composed of the following events:

Date	Event	Location
September 1–4	2005 JGP Skate Slovakia	Bratislava, Slovakia
September 7–11	2005 JGP Andorra Cup	Canillo, Andorra
September 14–17	2005 JGP Tallinn Cup	Tallinn, Estonia
September 22–25	2005 JGP Montreal	Montreal, Quebec, Canada
Sept. 29 – Oct. 2	2005 JGP Sofia Cup	Sofia, Bulgaria
October 6–9	2005 JGP Croatia Cup	Zagreb, Croatia
October 12–15	2005 JGP Baltic Cup	Gdańsk, Poland
October 20–23	2005 JGP SBC Trophy	Okaya, Japan
November 24–27	2005–06 Junior Grand Prix Final	Ostrava, Czech Republic

== Junior Grand Prix Final qualifiers ==
The following skaters qualified for the 2005–06 Junior Grand Prix Final, in order of qualification.

	Men	Ladies	Pairs	Ice dance
1	(Russia) Alexander Uspenski	(South Korea) Kim Yuna	(United States) Mariel Miller / Rockne Brubaker	(Canada) Tessa Virtue / Scott Moir
2	(Sweden) Adrian Schultheiss	(Japan) Aki Sawada	(United States) Aaryn Smith / Will Chitwood	(Russia) Natalia Mikhailova / Arkadi Sergeev
3	(Japan) Takahiko Kozuka	(Russia) Veronika Kropotina	(United States) Kendra Moyle / Andy Seitz	(Russia) Anastasia Gorshkova / Ilia Tkachenko
4	(United States) Stephen Carriere	(Japan) Akiko Kitamura	(Russia) Valeria Simakova / Anton Tokarev	(United States) Meryl Davis / Charlie White
5	(Japan) Ryo Shibata	(Georgia (country)) Elene Gedevanishvili	(United States) Bianca Butler / Joseph Jacobsen	(Russia) Anastasia Platonova / Andrei Maximishin
6	(Canada) Patrick Chan	(Japan) Mai Asada	(Russia) Ksenia Krasilnikova / Konstantin Bezmaternikh	(Italy) Anna Cappellini / Luca Lanotte
7	(United States) Geoffrey Varner	(United States) Christine Zukowski	(United States) Bridget Namiotka / John Coughlin	(Russia) Ekaterina Bobrova / Dmitri Soloviev
8	(United States) Austin Kanallakan	(China) Xu Binshu	(United States) Julia Vlassov / Drew Meekins	(United States) Trina Pratt / Todd Gilles
Alternates
1st	(China) Guan Jinlin	(United States) Katy Taylor	(Russia) Elizaveta Levshina / Konstantin Gavrin	(Canada) Allie Hann-McCurdy / Michael Coreno
2nd	(Russia) Sergei Voronov	(Japan) Nana Takeda	(Russia) Ekaterina Sheremetieva / Mikhail Kuznetsov	(Estonia) Grethe Grünberg / Kristian Rand
3rd	(Japan) Kosuke Morinaga	(United States) Juliana Cannarozzo	(Sweden) Angelika Pylkina / Niklas Hogner	(Russia) Polina Jakobs / Alexander Baidukov

Pavel Kaška was given the host wildcard spot to the Junior Grand Prix Final.

== Medalists ==
=== Men ===
Competition	Gold	Silver	Bronze	Details
Slovakia	(Russia) Alexander Uspenski	(United States) Stephen Carriere	(Germany) Philipp Tischendorf	
Andorra	(Japan) Ryo Shibata	(Sweden) Adrian Schultheiss	(United States) Geoffry Varner	
Estonia	(United States) Tommy Steenberg	(Japan) Kosuke Morinaga	(Russia) Ivan Tretiakov	
Canada	(Canada) Patrick Chan	(Japan) Takahiko Kozuka	(United States) Craig Ratterree	
Bulgaria	(United States) Stephen Carriere	(United States) Traighe Rouse	(Russia) Sergei Voronov	
Croatia	(Sweden) Adrian Schultheiss	(United States) Geoffry Varner	(Japan) Ryo Shibata	
Poland	(Russia) Alexander Uspenski	(United States) Austin Kanallakan	(China) Yang Chao	
Japan	(Japan) Takahiko Kozuka	(China) Guan Jinlin	(Russia) Sergei Voronov	
Final	(Japan) Takahiko Kozuka	(United States) Austin Kanallakan	(United States) Geoffry Varner	

=== Ladies ===
Competition	Gold	Silver	Bronze	Details
Slovakia	(South Korea) Kim Yuna	(Japan) Aki Sawada	(Georgia (country)) Elene Gedevanishvili	
Andorra	(Japan) Mai Asada	(United States) Christine Zukowski	(Finland) Laura Lepistö	
Estonia	(Georgia (country)) Elene Gedevanishvili	(Russia) Veronika Kropotina	(Finland) Kiira Korpi	
Canada	(Japan) Akiko Kitamura	(United States) Megan Oster	(France) Laura Dutertre	
Bulgaria	(South Korea) Kim Yuna	(United States) Katy Taylor	(United States) Juliana Cannarozzo	
Croatia	(Russia) Veronika Kropotina	(Japan) Nana Takeda	(United States) Christine Zukowski	
Poland	(Japan) Haruka Inoue	(Japan) Akiko Kitamura	(China) Xu Binshu	
Japan	(Japan) Aki Sawada	(China) Xu Binshu	(United States) Juliana Cannarozzo	
Final	(South Korea) Kim Yuna	(Japan) Aki Sawada	(China) Xu Binshu	

=== Pairs ===
Competition	Gold	Silver	Bronze	Details
Slovakia	(United States) Mariel Miller / Rockne Brubaker	(Russia) Valeria Simakova / Anton Tokarev	(Canada) Theresa Mailling / Dominique Welsh	
Andorra	(United States) Bianca Butler / Joseph Jacobsen	(United States) Julia Vlassov / Drew Meekins	(Russia) Ekaterina Ragozina / Pavel Sliusarenko	
Estonia	(United States) Aaryn Smith / Will Chitwood	(Russia) Elizaveta Levshina / Konstantin Gavrin	(United States) Lilly Pixley / John Salway	
Canada	(Russia) Valeria Simakova / Anton Tokarev	(Russia) Ekaterina Sheremetieva / Mikhail Kuznetsov	(Canada) Michelle Cronin / Brian Shales	
Bulgaria	(United States) Mariel Miller / Rockne Brubaker	(United States) Kendra Moyle / Andy Seitz	(Russia) Elizaveta Levshina / Konstantin Gavrin	
Croatia	(United States) Bridget Namiotka / John Coughlin	(Russia) Ksenia Krasilnikova / Konstantin Bezmaternikh	(United States) Julia Vlassov / Drew Meekins	
Poland	(United States) Aaryn Smith / Will Chitwood	(Russia) Ekaterina Vasilieva / Alexander Smirnov	(Sweden) Angelika Pylkina / Niklas Hogner	
Japan	(United States) Kendra Moyle / Andy Seitz	(Russia) Ksenia Krasilnikova / Konstantin Bezmaternikh	(United States) Bianca Butler / Joseph Jacobsen	
Final	(Russia) Valeria Simakova / Anton Tokarev	(United States) Julia Vlassov / Drew Meekins	(United States) Mariel Miller / Rockne Brubaker	

=== Ice dance ===
Competition	Gold	Silver	Bronze	Details
Slovakia	(Russia) Natalia Mikhailova / Arkadi Sergeev	(Italy) Anna Cappellini / Luca Lanotte	(United States) Trina Pratt / Todd Gilles	
Andorra	(Canada) Tessa Virtue / Scott Moir	(United States) Meryl Davis / Charlie White	(Russia) Ksenia Antonova / Roman Mylnikov	
Estonia	(Russia) Anastasia Gorshkova / Ilia Tkachenko	(Canada) Allie Hann-McCurdy / Michael Coreno	(Estonia) Grethe Grünberg / Kristian Rand	
Canada	(Canada) Tessa Virtue / Scott Moir	(Russia) Ekaterina Bobrova / Dmitri Soloviev	(Canada) Mylène Lamoureux / Michael Mee	
Bulgaria	(United States) Meryl Davis / Charlie White	(Italy) Anna Cappellini / Luca Lanotte	(Russia) Anastasia Platonova / Andrei Maximishin	
Croatia	(Russia) Natalia Mikhailova / Arkadi Sergeev	(United States) Trina Pratt / Todd Gilles	(Russia) Kristina Gorshkova / Vitali Butikov	
Poland	(Russia) Anastasia Gorshkova / Ilia Tkachenko	(Russia) Ekaterina Bobrova / Dmitri Soloviev	(United States) Jane Summersett / Elliott Pennington	
Japan	(Russia) Anastasia Platonova / Andrei Maximishin	(Germany) Rina Thieleke / Sascha Rabe	(Russia) Polina Jakobs / Alexander Baidukov	
Final	(Canada) Tessa Virtue / Scott Moir	(United States) Meryl Davis / Charlie White	(Italy) Anna Cappellini / Luca Lanotte	

== Medals table ==
Rank	Nation	Gold	Silver	Bronze	Total
1	United States (USA)	10	14	12	36
2	Russia (RUS)	10	9	9	28
3	Japan (JPN)	7	6	1	14
4	Canada (CAN)	4	1	3	8
5	South Korea (KOR)	3	0	0	3
6	Sweden (SWE)	1	1	1	3
7	Georgia (GEO)	1	0	1	2
8	China (CHN)	0	2	3	5
9	Italy (ITA)	0	2	1	3
10	Germany (GER)	0	1	1	2
11	Finland (FIN)	0	0	2	2
12	Estonia (EST)	0	0	1	1
12	France (FRA)	0	0	1	1
Totals (13 entries)		36	36	36	108
