= Valeria Simakova =

Russian pair skater

Valeria Simakova (born 4 December 1990, in Moscow, Soviet Union) is a Russian pair skater. With partner Anton Tokarev, she won the 2005 Junior Grand Prix Final.

Event	2004–05	2005–06
Junior Grand Prix Final		1st
JGP Canada		1st
JGP Slovakia		2nd
Coupe de Nice	3rd	
Russian Championships	11th	
Russian Junior Championships		3rd
