= Bridget Namiotka =

American pair skater (1990–2022)

Personal information
- Born: January 3, 1990 West Chester, Pennsylvania, U.S.
- Died: July 25, 2022 (aged 32)
- Height: 5 ft 6 in (1.67 m)

Figure skating career
- Country: United States
- Coach: Jeff Digregorio; Ron Ludington; Jeremy Allen
- Skating club: University of Delaware FSC

Bridget Namiotka (January 3, 1990 – July 25, 2022) was an American pair skater who won gold on the ISU Junior Grand Prix series and placed fourth at two World Junior Championships.

== Life and career ==
Bridget Namiotka, the daughter of Steve and Maureen Namiotka, was born in West Chester, Pennsylvania. She began learning to skate in 1997. She skated two seasons with Daniel Haskins, competing in juvenile and novice pairs, and then teamed up with Alex Merritt, with whom she placed fifth in novice pairs at the 2003 U.S. Championships.

Namiotka and John Coughlin began their partnership in late 2004. They made their international debut in September 2005, placing fourth at a 2005–06 ISU Junior Grand Prix (JGP) event in Montreal, Canada. The following month, the pair won gold at their second JGP assignment, in Zagreb, Croatia. This earned them qualification to the JGP Final, where they placed fifth. After taking silver in junior pairs at the 2006 U.S. Championships, they were named in the U.S. team to the 2006 World Junior Championships. Ranked sixth in the short and second in the free skate, they finished fourth overall in Ljubljana, Slovenia.

During the 2006–07 ISU Junior Grand Prix season, Namiotka/Coughlin won silver in Norway and bronze in the Czech Republic. They qualified to their second JGP Final, where they finished sixth. Appearing in the senior ranks, the pair placed ninth at the 2007 U.S. Championships. They were fourth at the 2007 World Junior Championships in Oberstdorf, Germany, which would be their final competition together. They announced the end of their partnership on July 3, 2007.

Namiotka competed while managing pancreatitis. In 2019, she accused Coughlin of sexually abusing her for two years. After her death in July 2022, her parents stated: "Bridget succumbed to her long struggles with addiction after several very difficult years of dealing with the trauma of sexual abuse."

== Programs ==
(with Coughlin)

Season	Short program	Free skating
2006–2007	Summertime by George Gershwin arranged by Kenny G	Pearl Harbor by Hans Zimmer; Freedom by Michael W. Smith
2005–2006	Time to Say Good Bye; Disco Firebird	The Prince of Egypt by Hans Zimmer

== Competitive highlights ==
=== With Coughlin ===
International
Event	2005–06	2006–07
World Junior Champ.	4th	4th
JGP Final	5th	6th
JGP Canada	4th	
JGP Croatia	1st	
JGP Czech Republic		3rd
JGP Norway		2nd
National
U.S. Championships	2nd J.	9th
J. = Junior level

== Accusations against John Coughlin ==
When Namiotka was between the ages of 14 and 17, her skating partner was John Coughlin, who was four years her senior. Coughlin died by suicide in January 2019, while under investigation for sexual abuse, and suspended, by the United States Center for SafeSport.

In May 2019, Namiotka identified herself on Facebook as a victim of Coughlin, becoming the first skater to go public. In the same posting, Namiotka said that Coughlin had "hurt a lot of people" and "had hurt at least 10 girls".
