= Anton Tokarev =

Russian pair skater

Anton Tokarev (born November 22, 1984, in Novosibirsk, Russia, Soviet Union) is a Russian pair skater. With partner Valeria Simakova, he won the 2005 Junior Grand Prix Final. He previously competed with Ekaterina Gladkova.

Event	2004–05	2005–06
Junior Grand Prix Final		1st
JGP Canada		1st
JGP Slovakia		2nd
Coupe de Nice	3rd	
Russian Championships	11th	
Russian Junior Championships		3rd
