= Ekaterina Vasilieva (figure skater) =

Russian former pair skater (born 1986)

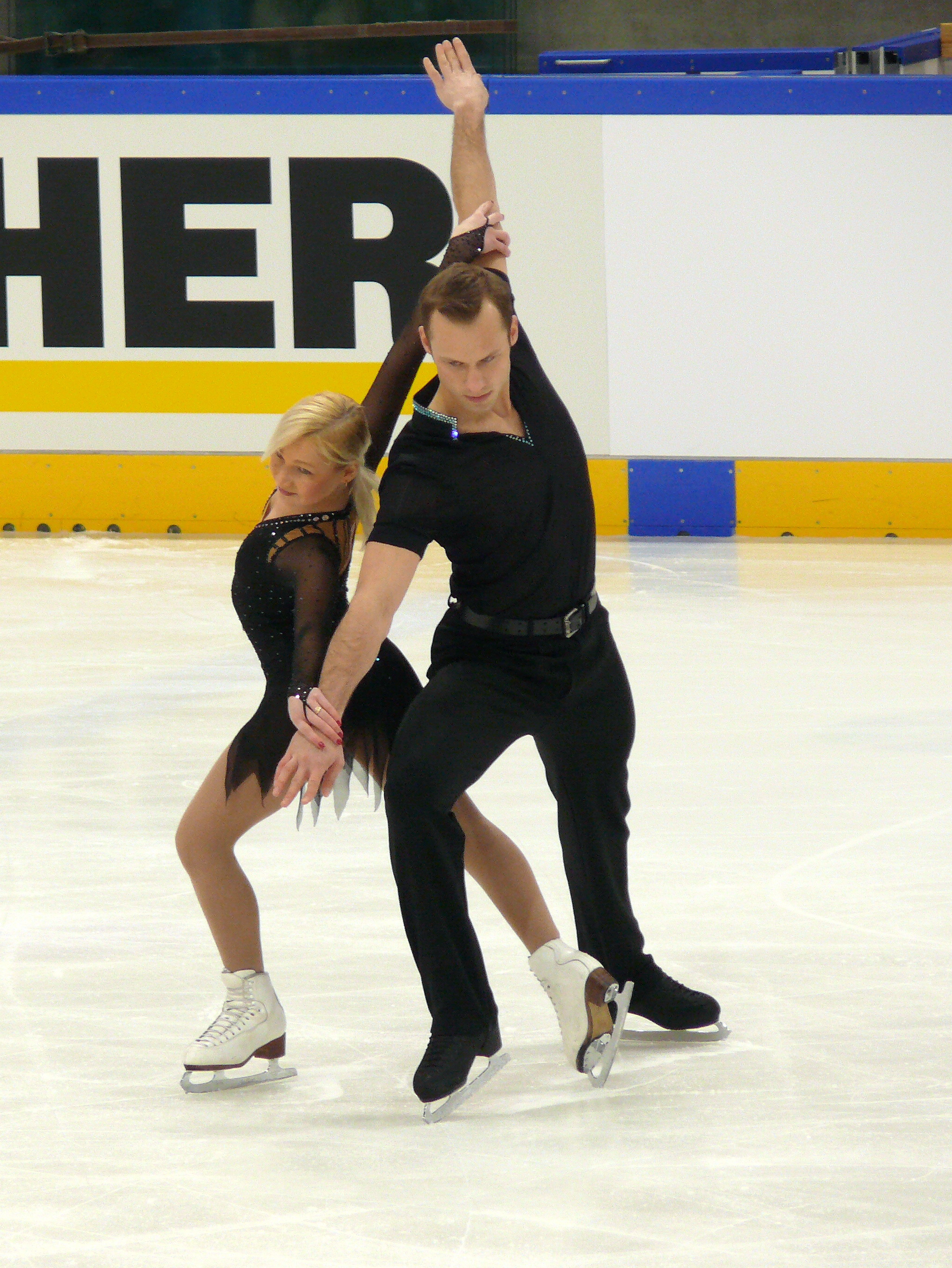
- Vasilieva and Wende in 2008.

Personal information
- Born: 9 September 1986 (age 40) Leningrad, Russian SFSR, Soviet Union
- Height: 1.50 m (4 ft 11 in)

Figure skating career
- Country: Russia; Germany

Ekaterina Vasilieva (born 9 September 1986) is a Russian former pair skater. Early in her career, she was a single skater. In 2005, she began competing in pairs with Alexander Smirnov. They placed 6th at the 2006 World Junior Championships for Russia. In the 2007–2008 season, she competed with Daniel Wende for Germany. They are the 2008 German bronze medalists.

== Competitive highlights ==
=== Pairs with Wende ===
Event	2007–2008
German Championships	3rd

=== Pairs with Smirnov ===
Results
International
Event	2005–2006
World Junior Championships	6th
Junior Grand Prix, Poland	2nd
National
Russian Championships	6th
Russian Junior Championships	1st

=== Singles career ===
Event	2001–02	2002–03	2003–04	2004–05
Russian Championships	11th	9th	12th	13th
Russian Junior Championships	9th			
Junior Grand Prix, Czech Republic	6th			

== Programs ==
(with Smirnov)

Season	Short program	Free skating
2005–2006	The Umbrellas of Cherbourg by Michel Legrand	Leeloo's Tune by Maksim Mrvica
