= Kendra Moyle =

American former competitive pair skater (born 1990)

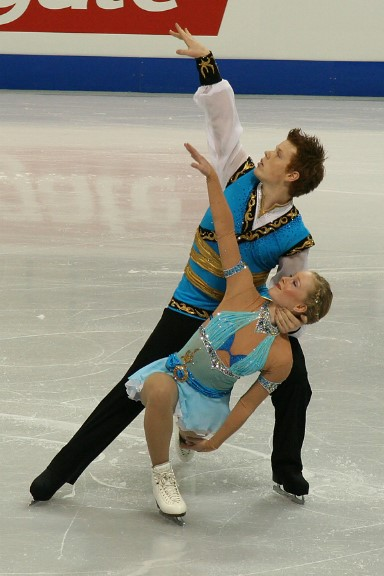
- Moyle and Seitz in 2006.

Personal information
- Born: September 17, 1990 (age 36) Chelsea, Michigan, U.S.
- Height: 5 ft 3 in (1.61 m)

Figure skating career
- Country: United States
- Skating club: Arctic FSC
- Retired: 2010

Kendra Moyle (born September 17, 1990) is an American former competitive pair skater. With former partner Andy Seitz, she is the 2006 World Junior silver medalist and 2006 U.S. Junior national champion.

== Career ==
Early in her pairs career, Moyle skated with Reed Minney. She teamed up with Andy Seitz in February 2005. They won the 2006 U.S. Junior national title and went on win silver at the 2006 World Junior Championships. The pair skated on both the Junior Grand Prix and senior Grand Prix circuit in the 2006/2007 season. Moyle and Seitz announced the end of their partnership on April 4, 2007. Moyle teamed up with Steven Pottenger.

After retiring from competition, Moyle joined Disney on Ice.

== Personal life ==
Moyle became engaged to her pairs partner Steven Pottenger in May 2012. They were married on June 23, 2013.

== Programs ==
(with Seitz)

Season	Short program	Free skating
2006–2007	Piano Concerto in A minor by E. Grieg performed by Maksim Mrvica	Polovetsian Dances from Prince Igor by Alexander Borodin
2005–2006	Rhapsody on a Theme of Paganini by Sergei Rachmaninoff	Jealousy Tango; Nu Tango

== Competitive highlights ==
=== With Pottenger ===
Event	2007–2008	2008–2009	2009–2010
U.S. Championships	15th	19th	13th

=== With Seitz ===
Results
International
Event	2005–2006	2006–2007
GP Cup of Russia		6th
GP Skate Canada		6th
International: Junior
Junior Worlds	2nd	5th
JGP Final	4th	4th
JGP Bulgaria	2nd	
JGP Czech Republic		2nd
JGP Japan	1st	
JGP Norway		1st
National
U.S. Championships	1st J.	6th
GP = Grand Prix; JGP = Junior Grand Prix; J. = Junior level
