= Xu Binshu =

Chinese figure skater

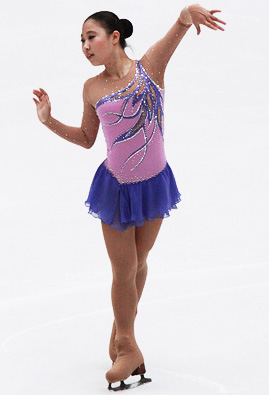
- Xu Binshu at the 2009 Cup of China

Personal information
- Full name: Xu Binshu
- Born: July 28, 1988 (age 38) or July 29, 1990 (age 36) Changchun
- Home town: Beijing
- Height: 1.55 m (5 ft 1 in)

Figure skating career
- Country: China
- Coach: Lijie Yu
- Skating club: Changchun Club
Medal record
Representing China
Ladies' Figure skating
Asian Winter Games
Bronze medal – third place	2007 Changchun	Ladies' singles
Junior Grand Prix Final
Bronze medal – third place	2005–2006 Ostrava	Ladies' singles

Xu Binshu (simplified Chinese: 许斌姝; traditional Chinese: 許斌姝; pinyin: Xǔ Bīnshū; born July 28, 1988, in Changchun, Jilin) is a Chinese former competitive figure skater. She is the 2004 & 2006 Chinese national champion. She won the bronze medal at the 2007 Asian Winter Games.

On February 14, 2011, Xu's age became the subject of controversy. Although her International Skating Union bio lists Xu as born on July 28, 1988, a Chinese skating association website suggested she was born on July 29, 1990, but it disappeared from the website by February 15. On February 17, the ISU said there were no discrepancies in terms of the birthdates listed on Xu's passport, ISU registration forms and the Chinese Olympic Committee's website.

== Programs ==
Season	Short program	Free skating	Exhibition
2009–2010	The Umbrellas of Cherbourg by Michel Legrand	Asian Dream of Song by Joe Hisaishi	
2008–2009	Carmen (modern arrangement) by Georges Bizet	Ashitaka sekki (from Princess Mononoke) by Joe Hisaishi	
2007–2008	Anastasia (soundtrack) by Stephen Flanery	Ashitaka sekki (from Princess Mononoke) by Joe Hisaishi	
2006–2007	Lee Loo's Theme by Maksim Mrvica	Mulan by Matthew Wilder	
2005–2006	Lee Loo's Theme by Maksim Mrvica	Mulan by Matthew Wilder	
2004–2005	One Summer's Day (from Spirited Away) by Joe Hisaishi	Malagueña by Ernesto Lecuona Mulan by Matthew Wilder	
2003–2004	One Summer's Day (from Spirited Away) by Joe Hisaishi	Malagueña by Ernesto Lecuona	
2002–2003	Tango	Capriccio Espagnol by Nikolai Rimsky-Korsakov	

== Competitive highlights ==
Results
International
Event	2002–03	2003–04	2004–05	2005–06	2006–07	2007–08	2008–09	2009–10	2010–11	2011–12
Four Continents					8th	13th	15th	21st		
GP Bompard							6th			
GP Cup of China					4th	10th	10th	WD		
GP Skate America						11th				
GP Skate Canada					8th					
Asian Games					3rd					
Universiade					6th		8th			
International: Junior
Junior Worlds	7th	9th	7th							
JGP Final				3rd						
JGP Canada	7th									
JGP China			4th							
JGP Germany			5th							
JGP Japan				2nd						
JGP Poland				3rd						
JGP USA	7th									
National
Chinese Champ.	3rd	1st	3rd	1st	2nd	4th	2nd			11th
Team events
World Team							6T / 9P			
GP = Grand Prix; JGP = Junior Grand Prix; WD = Withdrew; T = Team result; P = Personal result; Medals awarded for team result only.
