= Takahiko Kozuka =

Japanese figure skater (born 1989)

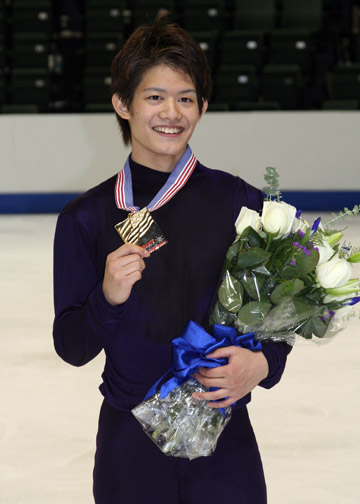
- Kozuka at the 2008 Skate America

Personal information
- Born: February 27, 1989 (age 37) Nagoya, Japan
- Height: 1.70 m (5 ft 7 in)

Figure skating career
- Country: Japan
- Skating club: Toyota Motor Corporation SC
- Began skating: 1992
- Retired: March 15, 2016
Event	Gold medal – first place	Silver medal – second place	Bronze medal – third place
World Championships	0	1	0
Four Continents Championships	0	1	1
Grand Prix Final	0	1	1
Japan Championships	1	3	3
World Team Trophy	1	0	1
World Junior Championships	1	0	0
Junior Grand Prix Final	1	0	0
Medal list
World Championships
Silver medal – second place	2011 Moscow	Singles
Four Continents Championships
Silver medal – second place	2014 Taipei	Singles
Bronze medal – third place	2009 Vancouver	Singles
Grand Prix Final
Silver medal – second place	2008–09 Goyang	Singles
Bronze medal – third place	2010–11 Beijing	Singles
Japan Championships
Gold medal – first place	2010–11 Nagano	Singles
Silver medal – second place	2007–08 Osaka	Singles
Silver medal – second place	2008–09 Nagano	Singles
Silver medal – second place	2011–12 Osaka	Singles
Bronze medal – third place	2009–10 Osaka	Singles
Bronze medal – third place	2013–14 Saitama	Singles
Bronze medal – third place	2014–15 Nagano	Singles
World Team Trophy
Gold medal – first place	2012 Tokyo	Team
Bronze medal – third place	2009 Tokyo	Team
World Junior Championships
Gold medal – first place	2006 Ljubljana	Singles
Junior Grand Prix Final
Gold medal – first place	2005–06 Ostrava	Singles

Takahiko Kozuka (小塚 崇彦, Kozuka Takahiko; born February 27, 1989) is a former competitive Japanese figure skater. He is the 2011 World silver medalist, a two-time Grand Prix Final medalist, a two-time Four Continents medalist, and the 2010–11 Japanese national champion. He is also the 2006 World Junior champion and the 2005–06 JGP Final champion.

== Personal life ==
Kozuka was born on February 27, 1989, in Nagoya, Japan. His father, Tsuguhiko Kozuka, competed in singles skating at the 1968 Olympics; his mother, Sachiko, competed in ice dancing; and his grandfather, Mitsuhiko Kozuka, was prominent in early Japanese skating.

Kozuka studied sports education at Chukyo University. His thesis compares jumps performed on the floor to those on the ice. In March 2016, he received a master's degree in physical education. During his competitive career, he worked for Toyota, one of his sponsors, and remained at the company after his retirement from skating.

On July 23, 2015, Kozuka announced his engagement to his girlfriend and Japanese television news presenter, Yukari Oshima. They married in February 2016.

== Career ==
As both of his parents are coaches, Kozuka stepped onto the ice at age three and began skating seriously at five. He was inspired by Yuka Sato's win at the 1994 World Championships. Nobuo Sato and Kumiko Sato became his coaches when he was in primary school.

Kozuka is known for the quality of his edges and basic skating skills. His coaching team made him practice compulsory figures when he was a child.

=== Early career ===
In the 2005–06 season, Kozuka won the Junior Grand Prix Final, the Japanese Junior Championships, and the World Junior Championships.

=== 2006–07 to 2008–09 ===
Kozuka debuted on the ISU Grand Prix of Figure Skating series in the 2006–07 season. He won the bronze medal at the 2006 NHK Trophy and placed 6th in the 2006 Trophée Eric Bompard. He placed 6th in the 2006–07 Japanese Championships and 4th in the 2007 Asian Winter Games.

In the 2007–08 season, he won the silver medal at the 2007–08 Japan Championships. He placed 8th at the 2008 Four Continents and 8th at the 2008 Worlds.

In the 2008–09 season, Kozuka won gold at the 2008 Skate America and silver at the 2008 Trophee Eric Bompard. He qualified for the Grand Prix Final where he won the silver medal. Kozuka won another national silver medal at the 2008–09 Japan Championships. He won the bronze medal at the 2009 Four Continents and placed 6th at the 2009 Worlds.

=== 2009–10 season ===
In the 2009–10 season, Kozuka won the silver medal at the 2009 Cup of Russia earning 215.13 points and placed seventh in the 2009 NHK Trophy scoring 186.00. He won the bronze medal at the Japanese National Championships with 236.13 points, placing second in the short program and third in the free skate, and thus qualified to compete at the 2010 Winter Olympics and at the 2010 World Championships.

Kozuka finished eighth overall in the men's singles at the 2010 Winter Olympics with 231.19 points. At the 2010 Worlds he finished in tenth position with a total of 216.73 points.

=== 2010–11 season ===
Kozuka's assigned events for the 2010–11 ISU Grand Prix season were the 2010 Cup of China and the 2010 Trophée Eric Bompard. He won the 2010 Cup of China with 233.51 points, placing first in both the short program and the free skate. He went on to win the 2010 Trophée Eric Bompard with 248.07, again winning both segments of the competition. He was the top qualifier for the men's event at the 2010–11 Grand Prix Final.

During a practice session at the Grand Prix Final, Kozuka inadvertently collided with Daisuke Takahashi. Both were shaken but went on to compete at the event. Kozuka said, "I apologized to him and he accepted the apology with a smile and claimed that he was not in pain but I still feel awful about it. I promised him and his coach that it will never happen again." Kozuka was fourth in the short program and second in the free skate, and won the bronze medal. He won his first national title in December 2010, placing first in both the short program and the free skate to total 251.93 points. At the 2011 World Championships, he placed sixth in the short program but moved to second overall after the long program and won his first World medal.

=== 2011–present ===
Kozuka was assigned to 2011 Skate America and 2011 NHK Trophy for the 2011–12 Grand Prix season, and he won the bronze medal at Skate America and the silver medal at NHK Trophy. Kozuka earned the silver medal at the 2011 Japanese national figure skating championships, thus qualifying for a spot on the Japanese team for the 2012 World Championships, where he finished 11th.

Kozuka began the 2012–13 season by winning gold at the 2012 Skate America and then won silver at the 2012 Rostelecom Cup. He injured his right instep in mid-December 2012. Kozuka finished 5th at the Japan Championships.

In 2013–14, Kozuka earned a bronze medal at the 2013 Cup of China. He placed 3rd at the 2013 Japanese National Championships but was not included in the Japanese team to the Olympics. He was assigned instead to the 2014 Four Continents Championships where he won the silver medal. When Daisuke Takahashi withdrew from the 2014 World Championships, Kozuka replaced him as a substitute and placed 6th at that competition.

In 2014–15, Kozuka placed 8th and 6th, respectively, at Skate Canada and Rostelecom Cup. He placed 6th in the short program at the 2014 Japanese National Championships, but rallied with a second-place free skate to place 3rd overall. He was assigned to the 2015 World Championships, where he finished 12th.

Toward the end of his career, Kozuka had tendinitis in his left ankle. He announced his retirement from skating on March 15, 2016. On April 17, he performed his farewell exhibition program, Epilogue, at the last show of 2016 Stars on Ice Japan in Tokyo. In 2017, he said that he would remain involved in figure skating. He started the Kozuka Skate Academy in 2016 and also works as a skating commentator for Fuji TV.

== Programs ==
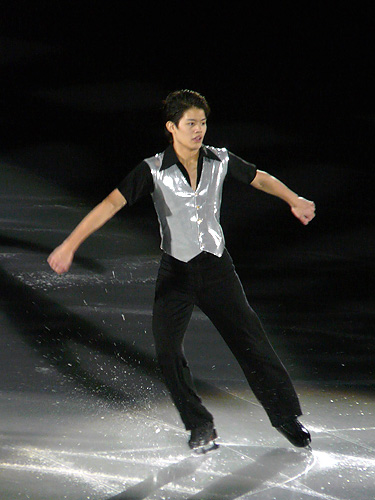
Kozuka performing his exhibition gala to Stayin' Alive at the 2007 Cup of Russia.

Season	Short program	Free skating	Exhibition
2015–2016	Respeto y orgullo by Jin Oki choreo. by Kenji Miyamoto	Io ci sarò by Andrea Bocelli choreo. by Lori Nichol	Epilogue by Ryuichi Sakamoto choreo. by Kenji Miyamoto
2014–2015	A Evaristo Carriego by Eduardo Oscar Rovira choreo. by Kenji Miyamoto	Io ci sarò by Andrea Bocelli choreo. by Lori Nichol	Respeto y orgullo by Jin Oki choreo. by Kenji Miyamoto
2013–2014	Unsquare Dance by Dave Brubeck choreo. by Shae-Lynn Bourne	Introduction and Rondo Capriccioso by Camille Saint-Saëns choreo. by Marina Zueva	Bang Bang by will.i.am choreo. by Yuka Sato
2012–2013	Theme from Exodus by Ernest Gold choreo. by David Wilson	Introduction and Rondo Capriccioso by Camille Saint-Saëns choreo. by Marina Zueva	The Sound of Silence by Simon & Garfunkel choreo. by Yuka Sato; Moondance by Van Morrison performed by Michael Bublé choreo. by Marina Zueva
2011–2012	Inner Urge by Joe Henderson choreo. by David Wilson	Fantasia for Nausicaa (from Nausicaä of the Valley of the Wind) by Joe Hisaishi choreo. by Marina Zueva, Fedor Andreev	Cello Song by Nick Drake choreo. by Yuka Sato
2010–2011	Soul Man by Orin Isaacs choreo. by Roberto Campanella, Yuka Sato	Piano Concerto No. 1 by Franz Liszt choreo. by Marina Zueva, Fedor Andreev	Hello, Goodbye & Safety Dance (from Glee) choreo. by Kurt Browning, Roberto Campanella; Free Fallin' performed by John Mayer choreo. by Yuka Sato
2009–2010	Bold as Love by Jimi Hendrix choreo. by Yuka Sato	Guitar Concerto by Michael Kamen and Tomoyasu Hotei choreo. by Yuka Sato	Closer by Ne-Yo choreo. by Clarence Ford
2008–2009	Take Five by the Dave Brubeck Quartet choreo. by Yuka Sato	Romeo and Juliet by Nino Rota choreo. by Yuka Sato	Save the Last Dance for Me by Michael Bublé choreo. by Sandra Bezic
2007–2008	Caravan by The Ventures choreo. by Yuka Sato	Beatles Concerto for 2 Pianos and Orchestra by John Rutter choreo. by Yuka Sato	Stayin' Alive (from Saturday Night Fever) by Bee Gees choreo. by Kenji Miyamoto
2006–2007	Art on Ice; Sarabande by Edvin Marton choreo. by Marina Zueva	Piano Concerto No. 2 by Frédéric Chopin choreo. by Marina Zueva	I Could Have Danced All Night (from My Fair Lady) by Jamie Cullum choreo. by Yuka Sato
2005–2006	Sing, Sing, Sing by Benny Goodman choreo. by Yuka Sato	Piano Concerto in F by George Gershwin choreo. by Yuka Sato	Car Wash by Missy Elliott, Christina Aguilera
2004–2005	Migra by Santana choreo. by Yuka Sato	Pirates of the Caribbean by Klaus Badelt, Hans Zimmer choreo. by Yuka Sato	Car Wash by Missy Elliott, Christina Aguilera
2003–2004	Sing, Sing, Sing by Benny Goodman	Polovtsian Dances (from Prince Igor) by Alexander Borodin	Cotton Eye Joe by Rednex
2002–2003	Don Quixote by Ludwig Minkus	Moonlight Serenade by Glenn Miller	
2001–2002	Sabre Dance (from Gayane) by Aram Khachaturian	España cañí by Pascual Marquina Narro	
2000–2001	The Mexican Hat Dance by Jarabe tapatio		

== Competitive highlights ==
GP: Grand Prix; JGP: Junior Grand Prix

International
Event	98–99	99–00	00–01	01–02	02–03	03–04	04–05	05–06	06–07	07–08	08–09	09–10	10–11	11–12	12–13	13–14	14–15	15–16
Olympics												8th						
Worlds										8th	6th	10th	2nd	11th		6th	12th	
Four Continents										8th	3rd		4th			2nd		
GP Final											2nd		3rd		5th			
GP Bompard									6th		2nd		1st					
GP Cup of China													1st			3rd		WD
GP NHK Trophy									3rd			7th		2nd				
GP Rostelecom										5th		2nd			2nd		6th	9th
GP Skate America										8th	1st			3rd	1st	6th		
GP Skate Canada																	8th	
Asian WG									4th									
Universiade																	2nd	
Gardena															1st			
International: Junior
Junior Worlds								1st										
JGP Final								1st										
JGP Canada					4th			2nd										
JGP Hungary							7th											
JGP Japan								1st										
JGP Mexico						2nd												
JGP Poland						9th												
National
Japan Champ.							4th	4th	6th	2nd	2nd	3rd	1st	2nd	5th	3rd	3rd	5th
Japan Junior		9th	18th	8th	7th	6th	4th	1st										
Japan Novice	1st B	1st B	1st A	1st A														
Team events
World Team; Trophy											3rd T 8th P			1st T 6th P				
Japan Open												3rd T 4th P	1st T 4th P	3rd T 3rd P	1st T 2nd P	1st T 2nd P	3rd T 6th P	
T = Team result; P = Personal result. Medals awarded for team result only.

== Detailed results ==
Small medals for short and free programs awarded only at ISU Championships.

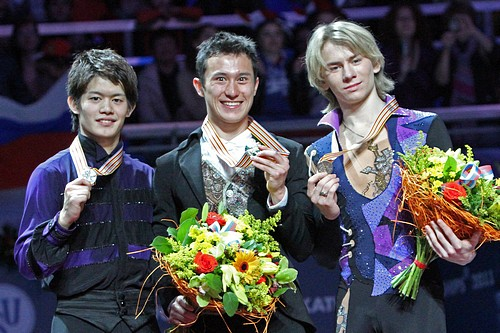
Kozuka (left) with the other medalists at the 2011 World Championships.

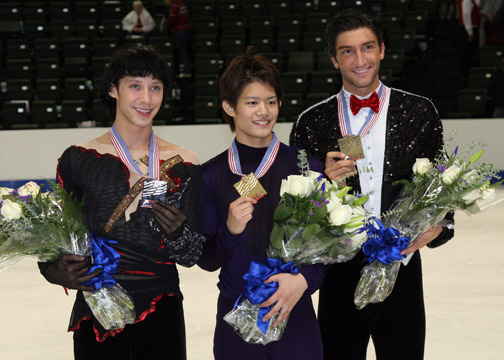
Kozuka (center) with the other medalists at the 2008 Skate America.

=== Senior results ===
2015–16 season
Date	Event	SP	FS	Total
November 20–22, 2015	2015 Rostelecom Cup	8; 69.61	9; 125.87	9; 195.48
2014–15 season
Date	Event	SP	FS	Total
March 23–29, 2015	2015 World Championships	19; 70.15	9; 146.81	12; 222.69
February 4–8, 2015	2015 Winter Universiade	1; 77.15	3; 140.55	2; 217.70
December 26–28, 2014	2014–15 Japan Championships	6; 72.39	2; 173.29	3; 245.68
November 14–16, 2014	2014 Rostelecom Cup	3; 81.38	7; 135.42	6; 216.80
October 31 – November 2, 2014	2014 Skate Canada	6; 75.85	11; 127.32	8; 203.17
October 4, 2014	2014 Japan Open (team event)	–	6; 119.51	3
2013–14 season
Date	Event	SP	FS	Total
March 24–30, 2014	2014 World Championships	6; 85.54	6; 152.48	6; 238.02
January 20–26, 2014	2014 Four Continents Championships	4; 76.85	1; 159.53	2; 236.38
December 20–23, 2013	2013–14 Japan Championships	3; 90.70	4; 174.11	3; 264.81
November 1–3, 2013	2013 Cup of China	3; 81.62	5; 145.30	3; 226.92
October 17–20, 2013	2013 Skate America	4; 77.75	5; 153.20	6; 230.95
October 5, 2013	2013 Japan Open (team event)	–	2; 158.32	1
2012–13 season
Date	Event	SP	FS	Total
April 1–3, 2013	2013 Gardena Spring Trophy	1; 81.18	2; 147.45	1; 228.63
December 20–23, 2012	2012–13 Japan Championships	3; 84.58	7; 143.98	5; 228.56
December 6–9, 2012	2012 Grand Prix Final	4; 86.39	5; 166.88	5; 253.27
November 9–11, 2012	2012 Rostelecom Cup	3; 76.34	3; 153.65	2; 229.99
October 19–21, 2012	2012 Skate America	2; 85.32	1; 166.12	1; 251.44
October 6, 2012	2012 Japan Open (team event)	–	2; 165.08	1
2011–12 season
Date	Event	SP	FS	Total
April 18–22, 2012	2012 World Team Trophy	8; 73.61	5; 151.69	6; 225.30
March 26 – April 1, 2012	2012 World Championships	13; 71.78	11; 146.85	11; 218.63
December 22–26, 2011	2011–12 Japan Championships	2; 85.60	2; 165.37	2; 250.97
November 11–13, 2011	2011 NHK Trophy	2; 79.77	2; 155.25	2; 235.02
October 21–23, 2011	2011 Skate America	2; 70.69	2; 141.40	3; 212.09
October 1, 2011	2011 Japan Open (team event)	–	3; 148.21	3
2010–11 season
Date	Event	SP	FS	Total
April 24 – May 1, 2011	2011 World Championships	6; 77.62	2; 180.79	2; 258.41
February 15–20, 2011	2011 Four Continents Championships	6; 66.25	2; 157.27	4; 223.52
December 24–27, 2010	2010–11 Japan Championships	1; 87.91	1; 164.02	1; 251.93
December 9–12, 2010	2010 Grand Prix Final	4; 77.90	2; 159.89	3; 237.79
November 26–28, 2010	2010 Trophée Eric Bompard	1; 77.64	1; 170.43	1; 248.07
November 5–7, 2010	2010 Cup of China	1; 77.40	1; 156.11	1; 233.51
October 2, 2010	2010 Japan Open (team event)	–	4; 150.71	1
2009–10 season
Date	Event	SP	FS	Total
March 22–28, 2010	2010 World Championships	4; 84.20	12; 132.53	10; 216.73
February 14–27, 2010	2010 Winter Olympic Games	8; 79.59	8; 151.60	8; 231.19
December 25–27, 2009	2009–10 Japan Championships	2; 80.54	3; 155.59	3; 236.13
November 5–8, 2009	2009 NHK Trophy	5; 74.05	10; 111.95	7; 186.00
October 22–25, 2009	2009 Rostelecom Cup	2; 75.50	2; 139.63	2; 215.13
October 3, 2009	2009 Japan Open (team event)	–	4; 130.13	3
2008–09 season
Date	Event	SP	FS	Total
April 16–19, 2009	2009 World Team Trophy	10; 65.25	7; 125.68	8; 190.93
March 23–29, 2009	2009 World Championships	5; 79.35	7; 142.83	6; 222.18
February 2–8, 2009	2009 Four Continents Championships	3; 76.61	4; 145.15	3; 221.76
December 24–27, 2008	2008–09 Japan Championships	2; 77.40	2; 148.54	2; 225.94
December 10–14, 2008	2008 Grand Prix Final	1; 83.90	3; 140.73	2; 224.63
November 13–16, 2008	2008 Trophée Eric Bompard	2; 77.00	2; 153.78	2; 230.78
October 23–26, 2008	2008 Skate America	3; 80.10	1; 146.08	1; 226.18
2007–2008 season
Date	Event	SP	FS	Total
March 17–23, 2008	2008 World Championships	8; 70.91	8; 134.24	8; 205.15
February 13–17, 2008	2008 Four Continents Championships	7; 67.48	6; 128.90	8; 196.38
December 26–28, 2007	2007–08 Japan Championships	2; 72.70	2; 146.64	2; 219.34
November 22–25, 2007	2007 Cup of Russia	7; 64.65	4; 135.33	5; 199.98
October 25–28, 2007	2007 Skate America	10; 56.25	7; 121.22	8; 177.47
2006–07 season
Date	Event	SP	FS	Total
April 29, 2007	2007 Japan Open (team event)	–	4; 132.76	1
February 1–3, 2007	2007 Asian Winter Games	5; 58.73	4; 118.38	4; 177.11
December 27–29, 2006	2006–07 Japan Championships	5; 70.49	6; 130.39	6; 200.88
Nov. 30 – Dec. 3, 2006	2006 NHK Trophy	4; 67.95	3; 140.39	3; 208.34
November 16–19, 2006	2006 Trophée Eric Bompard	11; 56.04	6; 121.81	6; 177.85

=== Junior results ===
2005–06 season
Date	Event	SP	FS	Total
March 6–12, 2006	2006 World Junior Championships	2; 60.07	1; 119.98	1; 180.05
December 22–26, 2005	2005–06 Japan Championships	10; 55.80	3; 137.20	4; 193.00
December 10–11, 2005	2005–06 Japan Junior Championships	1; 62.10	1; 121.20	1; 183.30
November 24–27, 2005	2005 Junior Grand Prix Final	1; 60.14	1; 118.58	1; 178.72
October 20–23, 2005	2005 JGP SBC Cup	3; 52.11	1; 106.83	1; 158.94
October 20–23, 2005	2005 JGP Montreal	3; 52.10	2; 113.67	2; 165.77
2004–05 season
Date	Event	SP	FS	Total
December 24–26, 2004	2004–05 Japan Championships	1; 71.46	6; 111.23	4; 182.69
November 20–21, 2004	2004–05 Japan Junior Championships	3; 58.50	3; 110.61	4; 169.11
September 2–5, 2004	2004 JGP Budapest	14; 42.87	5; 100.07	7; 142.94
2003–04 season
Date	Event	SP	FS	Total
November 21–23, 2003	2003–04 Japan Junior Championships	4	6	6
October 30 – November 2, 2003	2003 JGP Poland	11	8	9
September 24–28, 2003	2003 JGP Mexico	4	2	2
2002–03 season
Date	Event	SP	FS	Total
November 23–24, 2002	2002–03 Japan Junior Championships	9	7	7
September 26–29, 2002	2002 JGP Canada	6	7	4

World record holder
Preceded by (Japan) Daisuke Takahashi	Men's free skating 28 April 2011	Succeeded by (Canada) Patrick Chan
