= Christine Zukowski =

American figure skater

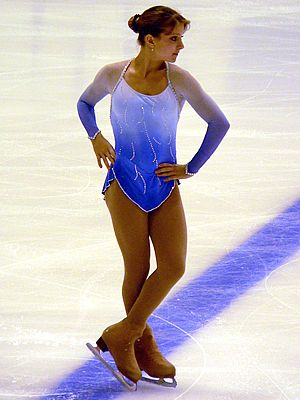
- Zukowski at the 2005 Croatia Cup

Personal information
- Born: August 9, 1989 (age 37) Philadelphia, Pennsylvania, U.S.
- Height: 5 ft 5 in (1.65 m)

Figure skating career
- Country: United States
- Discipline: Women's singles
- Began skating: 1994
- Retired: April 2008
World Junior Championships
Bronze medal – third place	2006 Ljubljana	Singles

Christine Zukowski (born August 9, 1989, in Philadelphia, Pennsylvania) is an American former competitive figure skater. She is the 2006 World Junior bronze medalist.

Zukowski started skating at age five. She changed coaches to Priscilla Hill before the 2007 U.S. Championships, where she placed 10th. After missing the 2007–08 season, she announced her retirement in April 2008 due to a chronic back injury.

== Programs ==
Season	Short program	Free skating	Exhibition
2007–08		Phantom of the Opera	
2006–07	Le Vertigo, Rondeau, Moderent by Joseph-Nicholas-Pancrace Royer	Armen's Variation by Aram Khachaturian; Lawrence of Arabia by Maurice Jarre; Gypsy Dance (from Henry VII) by Camille Saint-Saëns	
2005–06	The Firebird by Igor Stravinsky	Three Preludes by George Gershwin; The Mission by Ennio Morricone; Selections by Tim Janis	Our Lips Are Sealed by the Go-Go's
2004–05	Nyah (from Mission: Impossible 2) by Hans Zimmer	Samson and Delilah	

== Competitive highlights ==
GP: Grand Prix; JGP: Junior Grand Prix

International
Event	03–04	04–05	05–06	06–07
Four Continents			10th	
GP Bompard				7th
GP NHK Trophy				5th
International: Junior
Junior Worlds			3rd	
JGP Final			6th	
JGP Andorra			2nd	
JGP China		5th		
JGP Croatia			3rd	
Gardena	1st J.			
National
U.S. Champ.	1st N	2nd J.	6th	10th
