= Yang Chao (figure skater) =

Chinese figure skater

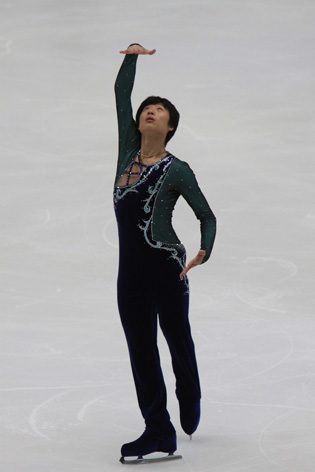
- Yang Chao in 2009

Personal information
- Born: July 26, 1989 (age 37) Harbin, Heilongjiang, China
- Height: 1.77 m (5 ft 10 in)

Figure skating career
- Country: China
- Skating club: Heilongjiang SC
- Began skating: 1995
- Retired: 2010

Yang Chao simplified Chinese: 杨超; traditional Chinese: 楊超; pinyin: Yáng Chāo; (born July 26, 1989 in Harbin, Heilongjiang) is a Chinese former competitive figure skater. He won three ISU Junior Grand Prix medals and finished in the top ten at two World Junior Championships. He is the 2009 and 2010 Chinese senior national bronze medalist.

== Programs ==
Season	Short program	Free skating
2008–10	Devil (soundtrack)	Lee Loos Theme by Tonči Huljić performed by Maksim Mrvica; Otoñal by Raúl Di Blasio
2007–08	Canzona by Secret Garden	Music; Otoñal by Raúl Di Blasio
2005–06	Canzona by Secret Garden	Tocata and Fugue performed by Maksim Mrvica

== Competitive highlights ==
GP: Grand Prix; JGP: Junior Grand Prix

International
Event	05–06	06–07	07–08	08–09	09–10
GP Bompard					8th
GP Cup of China					7th
International: Junior
Junior Worlds	10th		15th	6th	
JGP Austria			5th		
JGP Belarus				2nd	
JGP Estonia			3rd		
JGP France				6th	
JGP Norway		5th			
JGP Poland	3rd				
National
Chinese Champ.	5th			3rd	3rd
Team events
World Team Trophy				6th T (11th P)	
T = Team result; P = Personal result; Medals awarded for team result only.
