= Aki Sawada =

Japanese figure skater

Personal information
- Born: October 7, 1988 (age 38) Osaka, Japan
- Height: 1.60 m (5 ft 3 in)

Figure skating career
- Country: Japan
- Skating club: Kyoto Gaidainishi Club
- Began skating: 1994
- Retired: 2011

Japanese name
- Kanji: 澤田 亜紀
- Kana: さわだ あき
Transcriptions
- Romanization: Sawada Aki

Aki Sawada (澤田 亜紀, Sawada Aki; born 7 October 1988) is a Japanese former competitive figure skater. She is the 2005 ISU Junior Grand Prix Final silver medalist and 2005 JGP Japan champion.

== Career ==
Sawada began skating when she was six at her mother's encouragement. She debuted on the ISU Junior Grand Prix series in the 2002–03 season. In 2003–04, she won bronze medals at the ISU Junior Grand Prix in Japan and at the Japan Junior Championships. She was then assigned to the 2004 World Junior Championships, where she placed fifth.

During the 2004–05 JGP series, Sawada won silver in Hungary and bronze in Ukraine and qualified for the JGP Final, where she finished seventh. After repeating as the Japanese junior bronze medalist, she finished ninth at the 2005 World Junior Championships.

In 2005–06, Sawada won two JGP medals — silver in Slovakia and gold in Japan — and qualified for her second JGP Final, where she took the silver medal. After winning the Japanese junior title, she was sent to her third World Junior Championships and placed fifth.

Sawada made her senior international debut in the 2006–07 season. She competed at two Grand Prix events, the 2006 Cup of China and 2006 Cup of Russia, and at the 2007 Four Continents Championships, where she placed fourth.

Sawada landed triple Axels in national competition.

== Programs ==
Season	Short program	Free skating	Exhibition
2009–10	Bolero (from Moulin Rouge!) by Steve Sharples		
2007–08	Armenian Rhapsody by Ara Gevorgyan	Les Misérables by Claude-Michel Schönberg	
2006–07	Blues in the Night	"Paint It Black" by The Rolling Stones	
2005–06	Caravan by Duke Ellington	City of Veils	
2004–05	Caravan by Duke Ellington	Yellow River Piano Concerto	Believe in Yourself by Ziggy Marley
2003–04	Anthem from the 2002 FIFA World Cup by Vangelis	Spirited Away by Joe Hisaishi	

== Competition highlights ==
GP: Grand Prix; JGP: Junior Grand Prix

International
Event	99–00	00–01	01–02	02–03	03–04	04–05	05–06	06–07	07–08	08–09	09–10	10–11
Four Continents								4th				
GP Bompard									11th			
GP Cup of China								8th				
GP Cup of Russia								5th				
Finlandia Trophy											11th	
Asian Games								5th				
International: Junior
Junior Worlds					5th	9th	5th					
JGP Final						7th	2nd					
JGP Czech Rep.					5th							
JGP Hungary						2nd						
JGP Japan					3rd		1st					
JGP Serbia				5th								
JGP Slovakia							2nd					
JGP Ukraine						3rd						
National
Japan Champ.					9th	4th	7th	6th	9th	11th	19th	22nd
Japan Junior			7th	6th	3rd	3rd	1st					
Japan Novice	3rd B	6th A	1st A									
