= Andy Seitz =

American pair skater

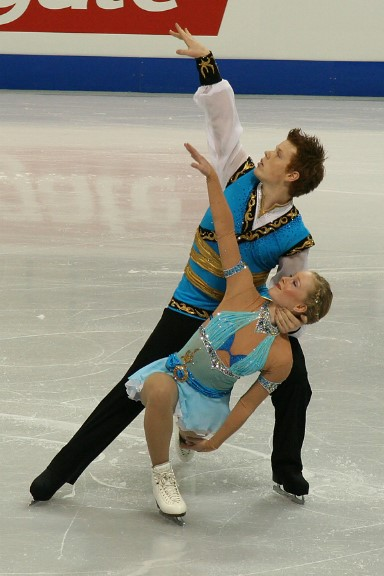
- Seitz and Moyle in 2006.

Personal information
- Born: December 13, 1985 (age 40) Davenport, Iowa

Figure skating career
- Country: United States
- Skating club: Onyx Skating Academy
- Retired: April 4, 2007

Andy Seitz (born December 13, 1985) is an American former competitive pair skater. He teamed up with Kendra Moyle in February 2005. Together, they are the 2006 U.S. Junior national champions and 2006 World Junior silver medalists. They skated on both the junior Grand Prix and senior Grand Prix circuit in the 2006/2007 season. He previously skated with sister Lindsey Seitz.

Seitz announced his retirement from competitive skating on April 4, 2007.

== Programs ==
(with Moyle)

Season	Short program	Free skating
2006–2007	Piano Concerto in A minor by E. Grieg performed by Maksim Mrvica	Polovetsian Dances from Prince Igor by Alexander Borodin
2005–2006	Rhapsody on a Theme of Paganini by Sergei Rachmaninoff	Jealousy Tango; Nu Tango

== Competitive highlights ==
=== With Seitz ===
Event	2004	2005
U.S. Championships	8th J.	9th J.
N. = Novice level; J. = Junior level

=== With Moyle ===
Results
International
Event	2005–2006	2006–2007
GP Cup of Russia		6th
GP Skate Canada		6th
International: Junior
Junior Worlds	2nd	5th
JGP Final	4th	4th
JGP Bulgaria	2nd	
JGP Czech Republic		2nd
JGP Japan	1st	
JGP Norway		1st
National
U.S. Championships	1st J.	6th
GP = Grand Prix; JGP = Junior Grand Prix; J. = Junior level
