= Guan Jinlin =

Chinese former competitive figure skater

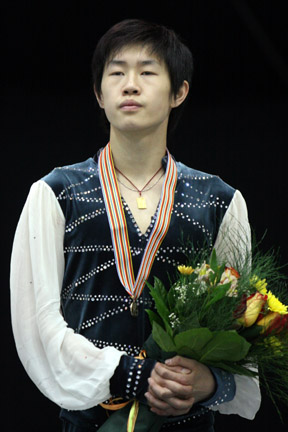
- Guan in 2008.

Personal information
- Born: April 25, 1989 (age 37) Qiqihar, Heilongjiang
- Home town: Harbin
- Height: 1.78 m (5 ft 10 in)

Figure skating career
- Country: China
- Coach: Ying Liu
- Skating club: Heilongjiang SC

Guan Jinlin (simplified Chinese: 关金林; traditional Chinese: 關金林; pinyin: Guān Jīnlín; born April 25, 1989) is a Chinese former competitive figure skater. He is the 2008 World Junior bronze medalist and finished in the top ten at four Four Continents Championships. He was assigned to the 2008 Trophée Eric Bompard and 2008 NHK Trophy Grand Prix events, but missed the 2008–09 season due to injury.

== Programs ==
Season	Short program	Free skating
2013–14	Danse macabre by Camille Saint-Saëns	Singin' in the Rain by Nacio Herb Brown et al.
2011–13	Danse macabre by Camille Saint-Saëns	Carmen Suite by Rodion Shchedrin
2010–11	Nothing Else Matters by Metallica	Turandot by Giacomo Puccini
2009–10	Korobushka by Bond	Turandot by Giacomo Puccini
2007–08	Tango de Los Exilados performed by Vanessa Mae	Silk Road Journeys by Yo Yo Ma; La califfa; Soundtrack by Ennio Morricone
2006–07	Sorry I Love You (soundtrack)	The Mission by Ennio Morricone
2005–2006	Sorry I Love You (soundtrack)	King Arthur by Hans Zimmer
2004–05	Secret Garden by Rolf Løvland	H. K. Police by Plan B

== Competitive highlights ==
GP: Grand Prix; JGP: Junior Grand Prix

International
Event	04–05	05–06	06–07	07–08	09–10	10–11	11–12	12–13	13–14
Worlds					17th				
Four Continents					9th	6th	10th		7th
GP Bompard								6th	
GP Cup of China					9th	8th		7th	
Universiade						4th			9th
International: Junior
Junior Worlds	5th	18th	6th	3rd					
JGP Final				5th					
JGP Austria				2nd					
JGP China	4th								
JGP Estonia				1st					
JGP Japan		2nd							
JGP Norway			2nd						
JGP Poland		4th							
National
Chinese NG							9th		
Chinese Champ.				5th	1st	4th	6th	4th	3rd
Guan did not compete in the 2008–09 season
