= Julia Vlassov =

American pair skater (born 1990)

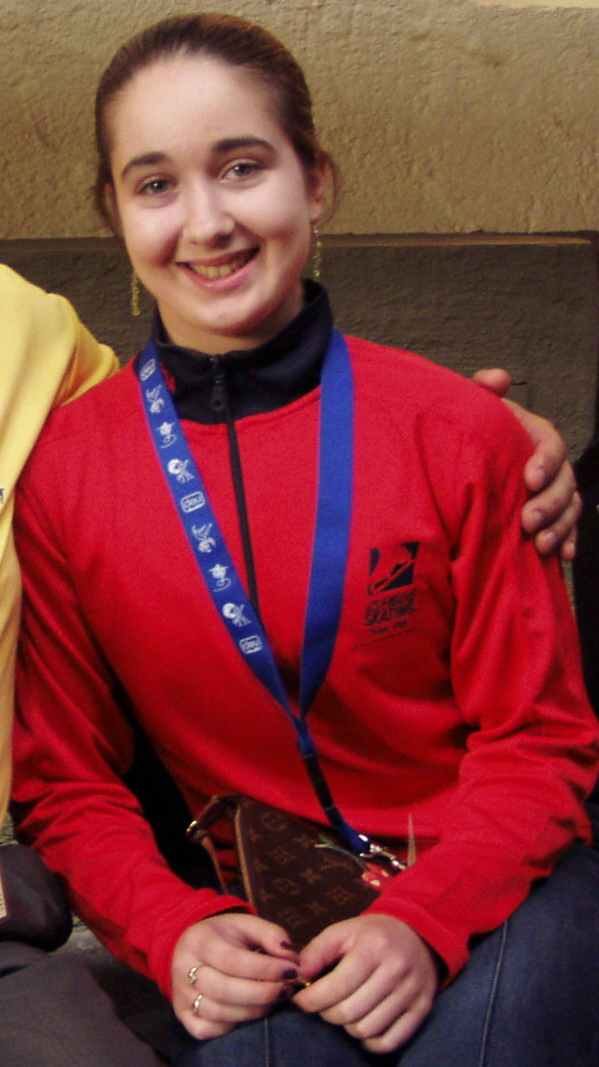
- Vlassov in 2006

Personal information
- Born: August 29, 1990 (age 35) Leningrad, Soviet Union
- Height: 5 ft 2 in (1.58 m)

Figure skating career
- Country: United States
- Coach: Alexander Vlassov
- Skating club: New England FSC
- Retired: 2007

Julia Vlassov (born August 29, 1990) is an American retired pair skater. She and partner Drew Meekins are the 2006 World Junior Champions.

== Personal life ==
Vlassov was born in Leningrad, Soviet Union (which reverted to the traditional name St. Petersburg, Russia the year after she was born), the daughter of Aleksandr Vlasov, the 1977 World silver medalist and European bronze medalist in pairs. The family moved to the United States in 1994.

== Career ==
Vlassov started skating at the age of 5. She competed as a single skater on the Juvenile and Intermediate levels before switching to pairs skating. She teamed up with Drew Meekins in 2002.

Following a successful junior career that was highlighted by medaling in every event they entered including Junior Grand Prix's, Junior Grand Prix Final, and the US National Championships, Vlassov and Meekins made their senior Grand Prix debut in the 2006–2007 season at 2006 Cup of China and 2006 NHK Trophy. They were assigned to two Grand Prix events for the 2007–2008 season; however, they were forced to withdraw from the 2007 Skate Canada International before the event began due to an injury to Meekins's shoulder which occurred during an attempted lift in practice. Vlassov and Meekins announced the end of their partnership on November 8, 2007.

== Programs ==
(with Meekins)

Season	Short program	Free skating
2007–2008	Malaguena by Ernesto Lecuona	Titanic Symphony by Richard Clayderman
2006–2007	Leelo's Tune; Sarabande by Maksim Mrvica	Warsaw Concerto performed by Richard Clayderman
2005–2006	Picante by Vanessa Mae	Paychek (soundtrack) by John Powell
2004–2005	Picante by Vanessa Mae	Paychek (soundtrack) by John Powell
2003–2004	Beethoven's 5th	Mission Impossible; Pink Panther

== Competitive highlights ==
(with Meekins)

Event	2004–05	2005–06	2006–07
World Junior Championships	9th	1st	
U.S. Championships	2nd J.	3rd J.	7th
Cup of China			6th
NHK Trophy			5th
Nebelhorn Trophy			2nd
Junior Grand Prix Final	4th	2nd	
Junior Grand Prix, Croatia		3rd	
Junior Grand Prix, Andorra		2nd	
Junior Grand Prix, Ukraine	3rd		
Junior Grand Prix, Belgrade	1st		
J. = Junior level
