= 2006–07 ISU Grand Prix of Figure Skating =

- Type: Grand Prix
- Date: October 27 – December 16, 2006
- Season: 2006–07
- Previous: 2005–06 Grand Prix
- Next: 2007–08 Grand Prix

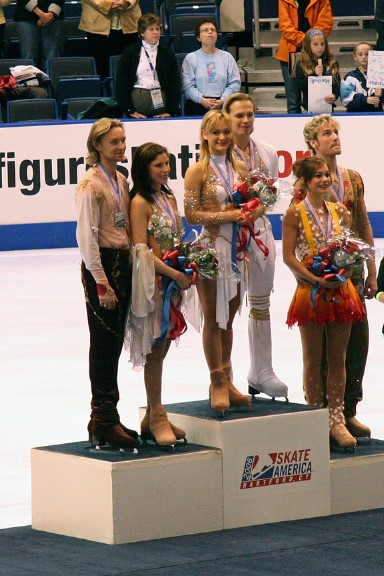
The ice dancing podium at the 2006 Skate America.

The 2006–07 ISU Grand Prix of Figure Skating was a series of international invitational competitions in the first half of the 2006–07 figure skating season. Skaters competed in the disciplines of men's singles, ladies' singles, pairs, and ice dancing over six events. Skaters earned a certain number of points per placement and the top six scoring skaters at the end of the series qualified for the 2006–07 Grand Prix of Figure Skating Final.

The Grand Prix series set the stage for the 2007 European Figure Skating Championships, the 2007 Four Continents Figure Skating Championships, the 2007 World Junior Figure Skating Championships, and the 2007 World Figure Skating Championships, as well as each country's national championships. The Grand Prix series began on 26 October 2006 and ended on 17 December 2006.

The Grand Prix was organized by the International Skating Union. Skaters competed for prize money and for a chance to compete in the Grand Prix Final. The corresponding series for Junior-level skaters was the 2006–07 ISU Junior Grand Prix.

== Qualifying ==
Skaters who reached the age of 14 by July 1, 2006 were eligible to compete on the senior Grand Prix circuit. The top six skaters from the 2006 World Figure Skating Championships were seeded and were guaranteed two events. Skaters who placed 7th through 12th were also given two events, though they were not considered seeded.

Skaters/teams who medaled at the 2005–06 Junior Grand Prix Final or the 2006 World Junior Figure Skating Championships were guaranteed one event. Skaters were medaled at both the Junior Grand Prix Final and the World Junior Championships were guaranteed only one event.

The host country was allowed to send three skaters/teams of their choosing in each discipline.

== Medal summary ==
Event	Date	Discipline	Gold	Silver	Bronze
(United States) Skate America	October 27	Pairs	(United States) Rena Inoue / John Baldwin	(Poland) Dorota Siudek / Mariusz Siudek (NSE)^{*}	(United States) Naomi Nari Nam / Themistocles Leftheris
(United States) Skate America	October 28	Men	(Japan) Nobunari Oda	(United States) Evan Lysacek	(France) Alban Préaubert
(United States) Skate America	October 28	Ladies	(Japan) Miki Ando	(United States) Kimmie Meissner	(Japan) Mao Asada
(United States) Skate America	October 29	Ice dancing	(Bulgaria) Albena Denkova / Maxim Staviski	(United States) Melissa Gregory / Denis Petukhov	(France) Nathalie Péchalat / Fabian Bourzat

Event	Date	Discipline	Gold	Silver	Bronze
Skate Canada International	November 3	Pairs	(China) Zhang Dan / Zhang Hao	(United States) Rena Inoue / John Baldwin (NSE)^{*}	(Canada) Valérie Marcoux / Craig Buntin
Skate Canada International	November 4	Men	(Switzerland) Stéphane Lambiel	(Japan) Daisuke Takahashi	(United States) Johnny Weir
Skate Canada International	November 4	Ladies	(Canada) Joannie Rochette	(Japan) Fumie Suguri	(South Korea) Yuna Kim
Skate Canada International	November 5	Ice dancing	(Canada) Marie-France Dubreuil / Patrice Lauzon	(Canada) Tessa Virtue / Scott Moir	(Italy) Federica Faiella / Massimo Scali

Event	Date	Discipline	Gold	Silver	Bronze
Cup of China	November 10	Pairs	(China) Shen Xue / Zhao Hongbo	(China) Pang Qing / Tong Jian	(Germany) Aliona Savchenko / Robin Szolkowy
Cup of China	November 11	Men	(United States) Evan Lysacek	(Belarus) Sergei Davydov	(Canada) Emanuel Sandhu
Cup of China	November 11	Ladies	(Hungary) Júlia Sebestyén	(Japan) Yukari Nakano	(United States) Emily Hughes
Cup of China	November 12	Ice dancing	(Russia) Oksana Domnina / Maxim Shabalin	(United States) Tanith Belbin / Benjamin Agosto	(Russia) Jana Khokhlova / Sergei Novitski

Event	Date	Discipline	Gold	Silver	Bronze
(France) Trophée Eric Bompard	November 16	Pairs	(Russia) Maria Petrova / Alexei Tikhonov	(United States) Rena Inoue / John Baldwin	(Russia) Julia Obertas / Sergei Slavnov
(France) Trophée Eric Bompard	November 17	Men	(France) Brian Joubert	(France) Alban Préaubert	(Russia) Sergei Dobrin
(France) Trophée Eric Bompard	November 17	Ladies	(South Korea) Yuna Kim	(Japan) Miki Ando	(United States) Kimmie Meissner
(France) Trophée Eric Bompard	November 18	Ice dancing	(Bulgaria) Albena Denkova / Maxim Staviski	(France) Isabelle Delobel / Olivier Schoenfelder	(Italy) Federica Faiella / Massimo Scali

Event	Date	Discipline	Gold	Silver	Bronze
Cup of Russia	November 25	Ladies	(Switzerland) Sarah Meier	(Hungary) Júlia Sebestyén	(Japan) Yoshie Onda
Cup of Russia	November 25	Pairs	(Germany) Aliona Savchenko / Robin Szolkowy	(Russia) Maria Petrova / Alexei Tikhonov	(Russia) Yuko Kawaguchi / Alexander Smirnov
Cup of Russia	November 25	Men	(France) Brian Joubert	(United States) Johnny Weir	(Russia) Ilia Klimkin
Cup of Russia	November 26	Ice dancing	(United States) Tanith Belbin / Benjamin Agosto	(Russia) Oksana Domnina / Maxim Shabalin	(France) Isabelle Delobel / Olivier Schoenfelder

Event	Date	Discipline	Gold	Silver	Bronze
(Japan) NHK Trophy	December 1	Pairs	(China) Shen Xue / Zhao Hongbo	(China) Zhang Dan / Zhang Hao	(Canada) Valérie Marcoux / Craig Buntin
(Japan) NHK Trophy	December 2	Ice dancing	(Canada) Marie-France Dubreuil / Patrice Lauzon	(Russia) Jana Khokhlova / Sergei Novitski	(United States) Melissa Gregory / Denis Petukhov
(Japan) NHK Trophy	December 2	Ladies	(Japan) Mao Asada	(Japan) Fumie Suguri	(Japan) Yukari Nakano
(Japan) NHK Trophy	December 3	Men	(Japan) Daisuke Takahashi	(Japan) Nobunari Oda	(Japan) Takahiko Kozuka

Event	Date	Discipline	Gold	Silver	Bronze
Grand Prix Final	December 16	Ice dancing	(Bulgaria) Albena Denkova / Maxim Staviski	(Canada) Marie-France Dubreuil / Patrice Lauzon	(Russia) Oksana Domnina / Maxim Shabalin
Grand Prix Final	December 16	Men	(France) Brian Joubert	(Japan) Daisuke Takahashi	(Japan) Nobunari Oda
Grand Prix Final	December 16	Ladies	(South Korea) Yuna Kim	(Japan) Mao Asada	(Switzerland) Sarah Meier
Grand Prix Final	December 16	Pairs	(China) Shen Xue / Zhao Hongbo	(Germany) Aliona Savchenko / Robin Szolkowy	(China) Zhang Dan / Zhang Hao

^{*}Non-scoring event

== Points ==
After the final event, the NHK Trophy, the six skaters/teams with the most points advanced to the Grand Prix Final. The point system was as follows:

Placement	Points
1st	15
2nd	13
3rd	11
4th	9
5th	7
6th	5
7th	4
8th	3

If a pairs team competed in more than two events, the teams who scored below them in their non-scoring competition did not automatically move up in gaining points. For example, if Team A placed second below Team B, and it was Team B's non-scoring event, Team A still earned 13 points, not 15.

Skaters had to compete in two events to qualify for the Final.

=== Final points ===
Skaters in bold qualified for the Grand Prix Final.

Points	Men	Ladies	Pairs	Ice dance
30	(France) **Brian Joubert**		(China) **Shen Xue / Zhao Hongbo**	(Bulgaria) **Albena Denkova / Maxim Staviski** (Canada) **Marie-France Dubreuil / Patrice Lauzon**
28	(United States) **Evan Lysacek** (Japan) **Daisuke Takahashi** (Japan) **Nobunari Oda**	(Japan) **Miki Ando** (Hungary) **Júlia Sebestyén**	(United States) **Rena Inoue / John Baldwin** (Russia) **Maria Petrova / Alexei Tikhonov** (China) **Zhang Dan / Zhang Hao**	(United States) Tanith Belbin / Benjamin Agosto (withdrew) (Russia) **Oksana Domnina / Maxim Shabalin**
26		(South Korea) **Yuna Kim** (Japan) **Mao Asada** (Japan) **Fumie Suguri**	(Germany) **Aliona Savchenko / Robin Szolkowy**	
24	(France) **Alban Préaubert** (United States) **Johnny Weir**	(Switzerland) **Sarah Meier** (Canada) Joannie Rochette (United States) Kimmie Meissner (Japan) Yukari Nakano		(France) **Isabelle Delobel / Olivier Schoenfelder** (Russia) **Jana Khokhlova / Sergei Novitski** (United States) **Melissa Gregory / Denis Petukhov** (called up)
22			(Canada) **Valérie Marcoux / Craig Buntin**	(Canada) Tessa Virtue / Scott Moir (Italy) Federica Faiella / Massimo Scali
20	(Belarus) Sergei Davydov (Russia) Ilia Klimkin			
18	(Canada) Shawn Sawyer (Canada) Emanuel Sandhu	(United States) Emily Hughes	(Canada) Elizabeth Putnam / Sean Wirtz	(United States) Meryl Davis / Charlie White
16	(Czech Republic) Tomáš Verner (Japan) Takahiko Kozuka	(United States) Beatrisa Liang	(Poland) Dorota Siudek / Mariusz Siudek (Canada) Utako Wakamatsu / Jean-Sébastien Fecteau (Russia) Julia Obertas / Sergei Slavnov	(United Kingdom) Sinead Kerr / John Kerr
15	(Switzerland) Stéphane Lambiel	(Japan) Yoshie Onda		(France) Nathalie Péchalat / Fabian Bourzat
14	(United States) Scott Smith (Russia) Sergei Dobrin (Belgium) Kevin van der Perren	(Finland) Susanna Pöykiö		(United States) Morgan Matthews / Maxim Zavozin
13		(Russia) Elena Sokolova	(China) Pang Qing / Tong Jian	
12	(Russia) Alexander Uspenski	(China) Xu Binshu	(United States) Tiffany Vise / Derek Trent (United States) Julia Vlassov / Drew Meekins	(Israel) Alexandra Zaretski / Roman Zaretski (Hungary) Nóra Hoffmann / Attila Elek
11	(Canada) Patrick Chan	(United States) Christine Zukowski	(United States) Naomi Nari Nam / Themistocles Leftheris (China) Li Jiaqi / Xu Jiankun (Russia) Yuko Kawaguchi / Alexander Smirnov (Russia) Maria Mukhortova / Maxim Trankov	(Japan) Nozomi Watanabe / Akiyuki Kido
10		(Japan) Mai Asada (Japan) Aki Sawada	(United States) Kendra Moyle / Andy Seitz	(United States) Kimberly Navarro / Brent Bommentre (France) Pernelle Carron / Mathieu Jost (Italy) Anna Cappellini / Luca Lanotte
9	(France) Yannick Ponsero (China) Li Chengjiang	(United States) Alissa Czisny (Finland) Kiira Korpi	(Canada) Anabelle Langlois / Cody Hay	
8	(Russia) Andrei Griazev	(Canada) Mira Leung (Russia) Arina Martinova	(Poland) Dominika Piątkowska / Dmitri Khromin	
7	(Japan) Kensuke Nakaniwa			(Russia) Anastasia Platonova / Andrei Maximishin (Canada) Lauren Senft / Leif Gislason
6	(China) Wu Jialiang		(Sweden) Angelika Pylkina / Niklas Hogner	
5	(Sweden) Kristoffer Berntsson	(Italy) Valentina Marchei (China) Fang Dan		(Armenia) Anastasia Grebenkina / Vazgen Azrojan (Ukraine) Anna Zadorozhniuk / Sergei Verbillo
4	(Russia) Sergei Voronov (Canada) Vaughn Chipeur		(Russia) Elena Efaieva / Alexei Menshikov (Canada) Jessica Miller / Ian Moram (France) Adeline Canac / Maxime Coia (United Kingdom) Stacey Kemp / David King	(Canada) Chantal Lefebvre / Arseni Markov (Azerbaijan) Kristin Fraser / Igor Lukanin (United States) Trina Pratt / Todd Gilles
3	(United States) Ryan Bradley (Canada) Marc Andre Craig	(France) Anne-Sophie Calvez (Russia) Viktoria Volchkova (Canada) Lesley Hawker	(Canada) Emilie Demers Boutin / Pierre-Philippe Joncas (France) Mélodie Chataigner / Medhi Bouzzine (Germany) Mari Vartmann / Florian Just	(Russia) Natalia Mikhailova / Arkadi Sergeev (Canada) Mylène Girard / Bradley Yaeger

== Prize money ==
The total prize money is $180,000 per individual event and $272,000 for the Final. All amounts are in U.S. dollars. Pairs and dance teams split the money. The breakdown is as follows:

Placement	Prize money (Series)	Prize money (Final)
1st	$18,000	$25,000
2nd	$13,000	$18,000
3rd	$9,000	$12,000
4th	$3,000	$6,000
5th	$2,000	$4,000
6th	-	$3,000
