= 2005 Cup of Russia =

- Type: Grand Prix
- Date: November 24 – 27
- Season: 2005–06
- Location: Saint Petersburg
- Host: Figure Skating Federation of Russia
- Venue: Ice Palace

Champions
- Men's singles: (Russia) Evgeni Plushenko
- Ladies' singles: (Russia) Irina Slutskaya
- Pairs: (Russia) Tatiana Totmianina / Maxim Marinin
- Ice dance: (Russia) Tatiana Navka / Roman Kostomarov
- Previous: 2004 Cup of Russia
- Next: 2006 Cup of Russia
- Previous Grand Prix: 2005 Trophée Éric Bompard
- Next Grand Prix: 2005 NHK Trophy

The 2005 Cup of Russia was the fifth event of six in the 2005–06 ISU Grand Prix of Figure Skating, a senior-level international invitational competition series. It was held at the Ice Palace in Saint Petersburg on November 24–27. Medals were awarded in the disciplines of men's singles, ladies' singles, pair skating, and ice dancing. Skaters earned points toward qualifying for the 2005–06 Grand Prix Final. The compulsory dance was the Yankee Polka.

== Results ==
=== Men ===
Rank	Name	Nation	Total points	SP		FS	
1	Evgeni Plushenko	Russia	241.80	1	87.20	1	154.60
2	Stéphane Lambiel	Switzerland	225.55	2	78.35	2	147.20
3	Johnny Weir	United States	206.79	3	75.15	4	131.64
4	Stefan Lindemann	Germany	194.63	4	68.65	6	125.98
5	Frédéric Dambier	France	193.65	7	59.75	3	133.90
6	Alban Préaubert	France	186.50	5	61.70	7	124.80
7	Shawn Sawyer	Canada	185.65	9	57.35	5	128.30
8	Yasuharu Nanri	Japan	168.79	6	59.85	8	108.94
9	Ilia Klimkin	Russia	165.35	8	59.55	9	105.80
10	Sergei Dobrin	Russia	159.43	10	56.09	10	103.34
11	Kristoffer Berntsson	Sweden	156.17	11	55.37	11	100.80
12	Gao Song	China	140.31	12	52.53	12	87.78

=== Ladies ===
Rank	Name	Nation	Total points	SP		FS	
1	Irina Slutskaya	Russia	198.06	1	67.58	1	130.48
2	Miki Ando	Japan	172.30	2	60.76	2	111.54
3	Yoshie Onda	Japan	142.40	3	47.56	3	94.84
4	Susanna Pöykiö	Finland	131.30	5	45.94	4	85.36
5	Emily Hughes	United States	125.76	4	46.56	7	79.20
6	Júlia Sebestyén	Hungary	124.38	7	43.38	5	81.00
7	Anastasia Gimazetdinova	Uzbekistan	121.96	8	41.70	6	80.26
8	Amber Corwin	United States	115.00	9	40.30	8	74.70
9	Hou Na	China	107.62	6	44.48	10	63.14
10	Tatiana Basova	Russia	102.76	10	29.96	9	72.80

=== Pairs ===
Rank	Name	Nation	Total points	SP		FS	
1	Tatiana Totmianina / Maxim Marinin	Russia	197.92	1	64.62	1	133.30
2	Julia Obertas / Sergei Slavnov	Russia	175.60	2	57.62	2	117.98
3	Dorota Zagorska / Mariusz Siudek	Poland	161.74	3	57.24	3	104.50
4	Maria Mukhortova / Maxim Trankov	Russia	146.42	4	49.24	4	97.18
5	Elizabeth Putnam / Sean Wirtz	Canada	138.66	7	45.76	5	92.90
6	Angelika Pylkina / Niklas Hogner	Sweden	134.80	6	45.78	6	89.02
7	Brittany Vise / Nicholas Kole	United States	134.24	5	46.78	7	87.46
8	Brooke Castile / Benjamin Okolski	United States	132.86	8	45.54	8	87.32
9	Eva-Maria Fitze / Rico Rex	Germany	127.54	9	43.14	9	84.40

=== Ice dancing ===
Rank	Name	Nation	Total points	CD		OD		FD	
1	Tatiana Navka / Roman Kostomarov	Russia	200.91	1	38.72	1	59.38	1	102.81
2	Galit Chait / Sergei Sakhnovski	Israel	184.65	2	35.03	2	55.57	2	94.05
3	Oksana Domnina / Maxim Shabalin	Russia	176.69	3	32.35	3	54.15	3	90.19
4	Melissa Gregory / Denis Petukhov	United States	159.83	4	29.62	5	46.78	4	83.43
5	Nathalie Péchalat / Fabian Bourzat	France	155.59	5	28.00	4	47.63	5	79.96
6	Olga Orlova / Vitali Novikov	Russia	148.78	8	25.05	6	46.54	6	77.19
7	Loren Galler-Rabinowitz / David Mitchell	United States	143.32	6	26.55	7	43.11	7	73.66
8	Alexandra Kauc / Michał Zych	Poland	135.45	7	25.15	10	39.36	8	70.94
9	Alessia Aureli / Andrea Vaturi	Italy	132.58	9	24.66	9	40.30	9	67.62
10	Siobhan Karam / Joshua McGrath	Canada	130.72	10	23.85	8	40.77	10	66.10
11	Nakako Tsuzuki / Kenji Miyamoto	Japan	123.01	11	22.65	11	37.30	11	63.06
