= 2006 Skate America =

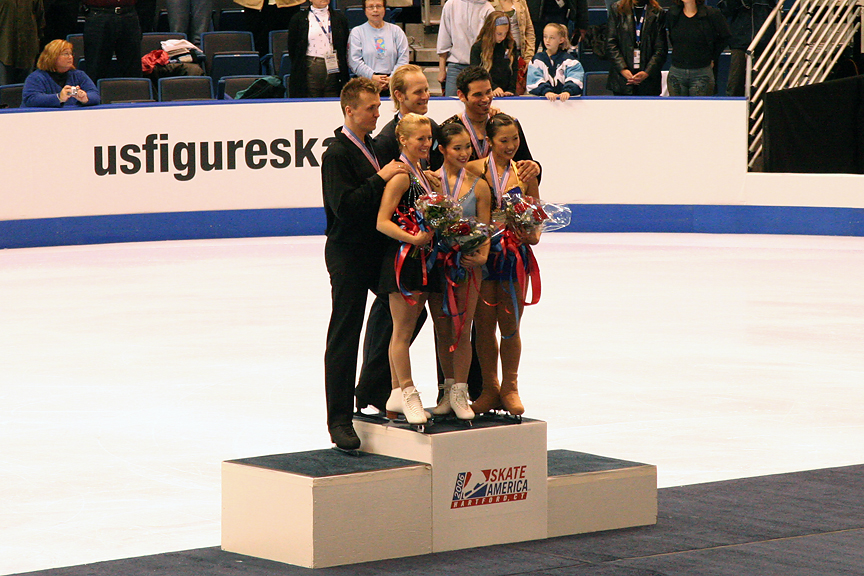
- The pairs' podium
- Type: Grand Prix
- Date: October 26 – 29
- Season: 2006–07
- Location: Hartford, Connecticut
- Host: U.S. Figure Skating
- Venue: Hartford Civic Center

Champions
- Men's singles: (Japan) Nobunari Oda
- Ladies' singles: (Japan) Miki Ando
- Pairs: (United States) Rena Inoue / John Baldwin
- Ice dance: (Bulgaria) Albena Denkova / Maxim Staviski
- Previous: 2005 Skate America
- Next: 2007 Skate America
- Next GP: 2006 Skate Canada International

The 2006 Skate America was the first event of six in the 2006–07 ISU Grand Prix of Figure Skating, a senior-level international invitational competition series. It was held at the Hartford Civic Center in Hartford, Connecticut on October 26–29. Medals were awarded in the disciplines of men's singles, ladies' singles, pair skating, and ice dancing. Skaters earned points toward qualifying for the 2006–07 Grand Prix Final.

== Results ==
=== Men ===
Rank	Name	Nation	Total points	SP		FS	
1	Nobunari Oda	Japan	231.39	1	81.80	2	149.59
2	Evan Lysacek	United States	221.09	3	70.35	1	150.74
3	Alban Préaubert	France	212.67	2	73.80	3	138.87
4	Kevin van der Perren	Belgium	178.52	5	63.43	5	115.09
5	Sergei Davydov	Belarus	175.72	6	60.91	7	114.81
6	Scott Smith	United States	173.08	8	58.25	6	114.83
7	Sergei Voronov	Russia	173.03	9	56.40	4	116.63
8	Ryan Bradley	United States	172.29	4	64.44	9	107.85
9	Christopher Mabee	Canada	163.16	7	58.35	10	104.81
10	Karel Zelenka	Italy	161.95	10	53.31	8	108.64
11	Yasuharu Nanri	Japan	150.36	12	49.20	11	101.16
WD	Nicholas Young	Canada		11	49.72		

=== Ladies ===
Rank	Name	Nation	Total points	SP		FS	
1	Miki Ando	Japan	192.59	2	66.74	1	125.85
2	Kimmie Meissner	United States	177.78	3	58.82	2	118.96
3	Mao Asada	Japan	171.23	1	68.84	4	102.39
4	Sarah Meier	Switzerland	169.01	4	57.60	3	111.41
5	Emily Hughes	United States	147.34	5	57.42	6	89.92
6	Mai Asada	Japan	138.29	6	48.66	7	89.63
7	Kiira Korpi	Finland	132.93	8	42.98	5	89.95
8	Mira Leung	Canada	128.07	7	44.34	8	83.73
9	Valentina Marchei	Italy	116.81	9	42.92	9	73.89
10	Michelle Cantu	Mexico	108.04	10	37.38	11	70.66
11	Katy Taylor	United States	106.07	11	34.66	10	71.41

=== Pairs ===
Rank	Name	Nation	Total points	SP		FS	
1	Rena Inoue / John Baldwin	United States	169.90	1	59.28	2	110.62
2	Dorota Siudek / Mariusz Siudek	Poland	161.47	4	50.34	1	111.13
3	Naomi Nari Nam / Themistocles Leftheris	United States	161.32	2	57.32	3	104.00
4	Anabelle Langlois / Cody Hay	Canada	153.63	3	55.86	4	97.77
5	Maria Mukhortova / Maxim Trankov	Russia	141.31	5	49.02	5	92.29
6	Tiffany Vise / Derek Trent	United States	131.19	7	46.86	6	84.33
7	Elena Efaieva / Alexei Menshikov	Russia	130.53	6	48.68	7	81.85
8	Dominika Piątkowska / Dmitri Khromin	Poland	123.21	8	44.58	8	78.63

=== Ice dancing ===
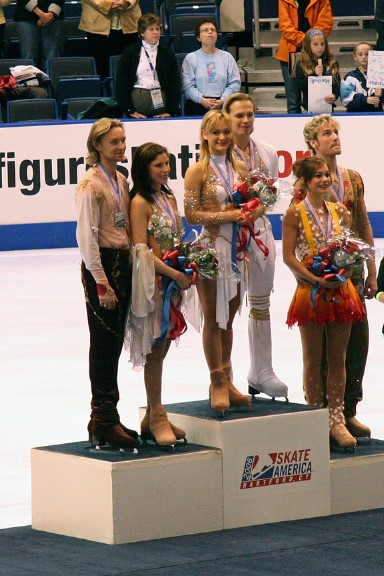
The ice dancing podium

Rank	Name	Nation	Total points	CD		OD		FD	
1	Albena Denkova / Maxim Staviski	Bulgaria	201.58	1	39.19	1	62.27	1	100.12
2	Melissa Gregory / Denis Petukhov	United States	180.98	2	35.02	2	55.61	2	90.35
3	Nathalie Péchalat / Fabian Bourzat	France	167.28	3	32.38	3	52.88	4	82.02
4	Morgan Matthews / Maxim Zavozin	United States	164.94	5	29.95	4	51.05	3	83.94
5	Sinead Kerr / John Kerr	United Kingdom	160.09	4	30.98	5	50.06	5	79.05
6	Kimberly Navarro / Brent Bommentre	United States	152.78	8	27.56	6	47.63	6	77.59
7	Nozomi Watanabe / Akiyuki Kido	Japan	149.27	6	29.79	8	44.37	7	75.11
8	Alexandra Zaretski / Roman Zaretski	Israel	143.95	7	27.62	7	46.02	9	70.31
9	Chantal Lefebvre / Arseni Markov	Canada	142.87	10	25.15	9	43.34	8	74.38
10	Natalia Mikhailova / Arkadi Sergeev	Russia	135.99	9	25.80	10	41.90	10	68.29
11	Allie Hann-McCurdy / Michael Coreno	Canada	131.07	11	23.58	11	39.57	11	67.92
