= 2004 Cup of Russia =

- Type: Grand Prix
- Date: November 25 – 28
- Season: 2004–05
- Location: Moscow
- Host: Figure Skating Federation of Russia
- Venue: Luzhniki Palace of Sports

Champions
- Men's singles: (Russia) Evgeni Plushenko
- Ladies' singles: (Russia) Irina Slutskaya
- Pairs: (China) Zhang Dan / Zhang Hao
- Ice dance: (Russia) Tatiana Navka / Roman Kostomarov
- Previous: 2003 Cup of Russia
- Next: 2005 Cup of Russia
- Previous GP: 2004 Trophée Éric Bompard
- Next GP: 2004–05 Grand Prix Final

The 2004 Cup of Russia was the sixth event of six in the 2004–05 ISU Grand Prix of Figure Skating, a senior-level international invitational competition series. It was held at the Luzhniki Palace of Sports in Moscow on November 25–28. Medals were awarded in the disciplines of men's singles, ladies' singles, pair skating, and ice dancing. Skaters earned points toward qualifying for the 2004–05 Grand Prix Final. The compulsory dance was the Midnight Blues.

== Results ==
=== Men ===
Rank	Name	Nation	Total points	SP		FS	
1	Evgeni Plushenko	Russia	233.45	1	74.95	1	158.50
2	Johnny Weir	United States	207.99	2	71.25	2	136.74
3	Zhang Min	China	186.04	6	61.48	3	124.56
4	Shawn Sawyer	Canada	176.74	3	63.32	4	113.42
5	Evan Lysacek	United States	172.45	4	61.95	6	110.50
6	Andrei Lezin	Russia	167.75	7	55.17	5	112.58
7	Andrei Griazev	Russia	166.56	5	61.86	8	104.70
8	Sergei Davydov	Belarus	158.85	9	50.55	7	108.30
9	Anton Kovalevski	Ukraine	146.11	10	48.25	9	97.86
10	Aidas Reklys	Lithuania	127.03	11	41.69	10	85.34
WD	Kevin van der Perren	Belgium		8	54.83		

=== Ladies ===
Rank	Name	Nation	Total points	SP		FS	
1	Irina Slutskaya	Russia	183.02	1	61.12	1	121.90
2	Shizuka Arakawa	Japan	155.52	3	56.70	3	98.82
3	Júlia Sebestyén	Hungary	155.06	4	56.08	2	98.98
4	Elena Sokolova	Russia	147.94	5	51.18	4	96.76
5	Annette Dytrt	Germany	136.20	6	49.62	6	86.58
6	Galina Maniachenko	Ukraine	136.16	7	49.32	5	86.84
7	Carolina Kostner	Italy	128.92	2	57.50	10	71.42
8	Liu Yan	China	119.60	11	38.00	8	81.60
9	Daria Timoshenko	Azerbaijan	116.74	12	34.86	7	81.88
10	Jennifer Kirk	United States	114.54	10	39.18	9	75.36
11	Tatiana Basova	Russia	108.26	8	41.94	12	66.32
12	Elina Kettunen	Finland	106.74	9	40.10	11	66.64

=== Pairs ===
Rank	Name	Nation	Total points	SP		FS	
1	Zhang Dan / Zhang Hao	China	167.70	1	57.56	1	110.14
2	Julia Obertas / Sergei Slavnov	Russia	158.92	2	56.46	2	102.46
3	Aliona Savchenko / Robin Szolkowy	Germany	151.38	7	49.18	3	102.20
4	Jennifer Don / Jonathon Hunt	United States	149.38	3	55.58	5	93.80
5	Tatiana Volosozhar / Stanislav Morozov	Ukraine	148.18	6	49.46	4	98.72
6	Maria Mukhortova / Maxim Trankov	Russia	130.66	5	49.54	8	81.12
7	Tiffany Scott / Philip Dulebohn	United States	128.84	10	42.92	6	85.92
8	Elizabeth Putnam / Sean Wirtz	Canada	128.74	9	44.98	7	83.76
9	Natalia Shestakova / Pavel Lebedev	Russia	128.34	8	48.06	9	80.28
WD	Dorota Zagorska / Mariusz Siudek	Poland		4	52.08		

=== Ice dancing ===
Rank	Name	Nation	Total points	CD		OD		FD	
1	Tatiana Navka / Roman Kostomarov	Russia	223.14	1	44.69	1	66.77	1	111.68
2	Elena Grushina / Ruslan Goncharov	Ukraine	208.87	2	39.83	2	63.23	2	105.81
3	Federica Faiella / Massimo Scali	Italy	191.27	4	35.42	3	56.94	3	98.91
4	Oksana Domnina / Maxim Shabalin	Russia	187.51	3	36.79	4	54.19	4	96.53
5	Sinead Kerr / John Kerr	United Kingdom	166.13	5	30.75	5	48.85	6	86.53
6	Natalia Gudina / Alexei Beletski	Israel	166.02	6	30.60	6	47.84	5	87.58
7	Jana Khokhlova / Sergei Novitski	Russia	156.15	7	29.76	7	44.99	7	81.40
8	Nozomi Watanabe / Akiyuki Kido	Japan	150.61	8	27.17	8	43.56	8	79.88
9	Alexandra Kauc / Michał Zych	Poland	140.43	9	25.44	9	41.58	9	73.41
10	Diana Janošťáková / Jiří Procházka	Czech Republic	131.91	10	24.56	10	39.01	10	68.34
11	Kendra Goodwin / Brent Bommentre	United States	128.17	11	23.68	11	36.27	11	68.22
