= 2006 Trophée Éric Bompard =

- Type: Grand Prix
- Date: November 17 – 19
- Season: 2006–07
- Location: Paris
- Venue: Palais Omnisports Paris Bercy

Champions
- Men's singles: (France) Brian Joubert
- Ladies' singles: (South Korea) Yuna Kim
- Pairs: (Russia) Maria Petrova / Alexei Tikhonov
- Ice dance: (Bulgaria) Albena Denkova / Maxim Staviski
- Previous: 2005 Trophée Éric Bompard
- Next: 2007 Trophée Éric Bompard
- Previous Grand Prix: 2006 Cup of China
- Next Grand Prix: 2006 Cup of Russia

The 2006 Trophée Éric Bompard was the fourth event of six in the 2006–07 ISU Grand Prix of Figure Skating, a senior-level international invitational competition series. It was held at the Palais Omnisports Paris Bercy in Paris on November 17–19. Medals were awarded in the disciplines of men's singles, ladies' singles, pair skating, and ice dancing. Skaters earned points toward qualifying for the 2006–07 Grand Prix Final.

The competition was named after the Éric Bompard company, which became its chief sponsor in 2004.

== Results ==
=== Men ===
Rank	Name	Nation	Total points	SP		FS	
1	Brian Joubert	France	231.08	1	77.35	1	153.73
2	Alban Préaubert	France	211.72	2	71.38	2	140.34
3	Sergei Dobrin	Russia	193.50	4	62.85	3	130.65
4	Ilia Klimkin	Russia	187.16	3	64.80	4	122.36
5	Patrick Chan	Canada	179.92	6	57.82	5	122.10
6	Takahiko Kozuka	Japan	177.85	11	56.04	6	121.81
7	Andrei Griazev	Russia	177.67	9	56.39	7	121.28
8	Shawn Sawyer	Canada	177.51	8	56.54	8	120.97
9	Yasuharu Nanri	Japan	173.51	7	56.80	9	116.71
10	Jérémie Colot	France	166.34	10	56.26	10	110.08
11	Jamal Othman	Switzerland	159.02	5	59.18	11	99.84

=== Ladies ===
Rank	Name	Nation	Total points	SP		FS	
1	Yuna Kim	South Korea	184.54	1	65.22	1	119.32
2	Miki Ando	Japan	174.44	2	65.02	2	109.42
3	Kimmie Meissner	United States	158.03	4	52.56	4	105.47
4	Joannie Rochette	Canada	151.52	3	58.92	5	92.60
5	Susanna Pöykiö	Finland	148.81	8	42.94	3	105.87
6	Valentina Marchei	Italy	129.73	7	46.02	6	83.71
7	Christine Zukowski	United States	123.59	6	47.04	7	76.55
8	Anne-Sophie Calvez	France	123.26	5	50.96	8	72.30
9	Nadège Bobillier	France	109.88	9	40.52	9	69.36
10	Sonia Radeva	Bulgaria	95.74	11	32.34	10	63.40
11	Candice Didier	France	91.68	10	32.42	11	59.26

=== Pairs ===
Rank	Name	Nation	Total points	SP		FS	
1	Maria Petrova / Alexei Tikhonov	Russia	174.27	1	61.64	1	112.63
2	Rena Inoue / John Baldwin	United States	164.73	2	57.44	2	107.29
3	Julia Obertas / Sergei Slavnov	Russia	153.55	3	55.30	3	98.25
4	Elizabeth Putnam / Sean Wirtz	Canada	151.71	4	53.48	4	98.23
5	Li Jiaqi / Xu Jiankun	China	134.95	5	51.02	5	83.93
6	Dominika Piątkowska / Dmitri Khromin	Poland	125.91	6	46.94	6	78.97
7	Adeline Canac / Maxima Coia	France	117.98	7	44.74	7	73.24
8	Mélodie Chataigner / Medhi Bouzzine	France	108.85	8	44.36	8	64.49

=== Ice dancing ===
Rank	Name	Nation	Total points	CD		OD		FD	
1	Albena Denkova / Maxim Staviski	Bulgaria	197.25	1	38.32	1	61.15	1	97.78
2	Isabelle Delobel / Olivier Schoenfelder	France	194.62	2	37.65	2	59.25	2	97.72
3	Federica Faiella / Massimo Scali	Italy	176.62	3	33.63	3	54.76	3	88.23
4	Tessa Virtue / Scott Moir	Canada	160.12	5	31.29	8	45.08	4	83.75
5	Anna Cappellini / Luca Lanotte	Italy	159.77	6	31.18	4	49.58	5	79.01
6	Nóra Hoffmann / Attila Elek	Hungary	155.36	7	30.54	6	47.93	7	76.89
7	Nathalie Péchalat / Fabian Bourzat	France	153.30	4	31.53	5	49.23	8	72.54
8	Pernelle Carron / Mathieu Jost	France	151.93	9	28.73	7	45.13	6	78.07
9	Anastasia Grebenkina / Vazgen Azrojan	Armenia	143.25	8	28.86	9	42.80	9	71.59
10	Allie Hann-McCurdy / Michael Coreno	Canada	132.73	10	25.36	10	41.01	10	66.36
11	Huang Xintong / Zheng Xun	China	126.70	11	23.97	11	38.91	12	63.82
12	Zsuzsanna Nagy / György Elek	Hungary	123.16	12	22.97	12	36.21	11	63.98
