= 2007 Grand Prix Final =

The 2007 Grand Prix Final may refer to:

- 2006–2007 Grand Prix of Figure Skating Final, which took place in December 2006, and is officially the "2007 Grand Prix Final"
- 2007–2008 Grand Prix of Figure Skating Final, which took place in December 2007, and is officially the "2008 Grand Prix Final"
