= 2006 Cup of Russia =

- Type: Grand Prix
- Date: November 23 – 26
- Season: 2006–07
- Location: Moscow
- Host: Figure Skating Federation of Russia
- Venue: Luzhniki Small Sports Arena

Champions
- Men's singles: (France) Brian Joubert
- Ladies' singles: (Switzerland) Sarah Meier
- Pairs: (Germany) Aliona Savchenko / Robin Szolkowy
- Ice dance: (United States) Tanith Belbin / Benjamin Agosto
- Previous: 2005 Cup of Russia
- Next: 2007 Cup of Russia
- Previous Grand Prix: 2006 Trophée Éric Bompard
- Next Grand Prix: 2006 NHK Trophy

The 2006 Cup of Russia was the fifth event of six in the 2006–07 ISU Grand Prix of Figure Skating, a senior-level international invitational competition series. It was held at the Luzhniki Small Sports Arena in Moscow on November 23–26. Medals were awarded in the disciplines of men's singles, ladies' singles, pair skating, and ice dancing. Skaters earned points toward qualifying for the 2006–07 Grand Prix Final.

== Results ==
=== Men ===
Rank	Name	Nation	Total points	SP		FS	
1	Brian Joubert	France	237.83	1	77.70	1	160.13
2	Johnny Weir	United States	196.28	2	75.10	5	121.18
3	Ilia Klimkin	Russia	187.45	4	67.45	6	120.00
4	Tomáš Verner	Czech Republic	186.50	6	64.45	3	122.05
5	Emanuel Sandhu	Canada	185.45	3	71.30	8	114.15
6	Kristoffer Berntsson	Sweden	184.70	5	67.25	7	117.45
7	Andrei Griazev	Russia	184.02	8	62.59	4	121.43
8	Sergei Dobrin	Russia	182.39	9	59.36	2	123.03
9	Anton Kovalevski	Ukraine	162.98	10	53.69	9	109.29
10	Christopher Mabee	Canada	161.16	7	62.80	12	98.36
11	Gregor Urbas	Slovenia	159.22	11	51.39	11	107.83
12	Ryo Shibata	Japan	158.43	12	49.32	10	109.11

=== Ladies ===
Rank	Name	Nation	Total points	SP		FS	
1	Sarah Meier	Switzerland	159.17	3	50.92	1	108.25
2	Júlia Sebestyén	Hungary	146.75	1	54.36	5	92.39
3	Yoshie Onda	Japan	143.60	6	45.56	2	98.04
4	Elena Sokolova	Russia	143.11	2	52.08	6	91.03
5	Aki Sawada	Japan	142.04	7	45.56	3	96.48
6	Kiira Korpi	Finland	137.41	9	43.14	4	94.27
7	Arina Martinova	Russia	134.91	4	49.46	7	85.45
8	Viktoria Volchkova	Russia	130.83	5	47.50	8	83.33
9	Alissa Czisny	United States	121.21	8	44.98	10	76.23
10	Liu Yan	China	114.65	11	40.72	11	73.93
11	Anastasia Gimazetdinova	Uzbekistan	114.12	10	42.76	12	71.36
12	Viktória Pavuk	Hungary	111.74	12	34.88	9	76.86

=== Pairs ===
Canadian pair team Anabelle Langlois / Cody Hay were forced to withdraw after the airline lost Langlois's skates.

Rank	Name	Nation	Total points	SP		FS	
1	Aliona Savchenko / Robin Szolkowy	Germany	179.45	1	63.96	2	115.49
2	Maria Petrova / Alexei Tikhonov	Russia	178.03	2	62.28	1	115.75
3	Yuko Kawaguchi / Alexander Smirnov	Russia	168.50	3	59.46	3	109.04
4	Dorota Siudek / Mariusz Siudek	Poland	163.13	4	57.98	4	105.15
5	Utako Wakamatsu / Jean-Sébastien Fecteau	Canada	140.63	5	52.92	5	87.71
6	Kendra Moyle / Andy Seitz	United States	136.78	6	49.08	6	87.70
7	Maria Mukhortova / Maxim Trankov	Russia	132.39	7	47.96	8	84.43
8	Angelika Pylkina / Niklas Hogner	Sweden	130.94	8	44.00	7	86.94
WD	Anabelle Langlois / Cody Hay	Canada					

=== Ice dancing ===
Rank	Name	Nation	Total points	CD		OD		FD	
1	Tanith Belbin / Benjamin Agosto	United States	186.33	2	36.56	1	58.02	2	91.75
2	Oksana Domnina / Maxim Shabalin	Russia	185.34	1	37.99	3	52.36	1	94.99
3	Isabelle Delobel / Olivier Schoenfelder	France	183.53	3	36.50	2	57.83	3	89.20
4	Sinead Kerr / John Kerr	United Kingdom	168.53	4	32.25	4	51.88	4	84.40
5	Nóra Hoffmann / Attila Elek	Hungary	161.57	6	30.25	6	48.89	5	82.43
6	Morgan Matthews / Maxim Zavozin	United States	159.07	8	27.84	5	50.46	6	80.77
7	Kristin Fraser / Igor Lukanin	Azerbaijan	157.15	5	30.35	7	47.17	7	79.63
8	Anna Cappellini / Luca Lanotte	Italy	149.53	7	28.12	8	46.44	9	74.97
9	Anastasia Platonova / Andrei Maximishin	Russia	148.72	9	27.64	9	45.65	8	75.43
10	Alla Beknazarova / Vladimir Zuev	Ukraine	134.05	10	25.14	10	40.19	10	68.72
WD	Ekaterina Rubleva / Ivan Shefer	Russia							
