= Sergei Dobrin =

Russian competitive figure skater

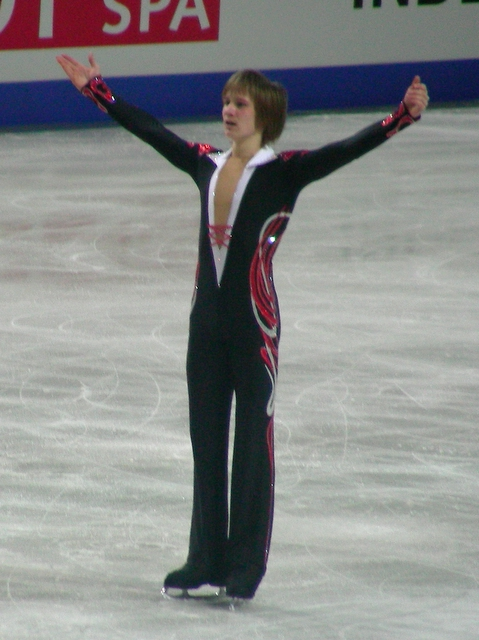
- Dobrin in 2007.

Personal information
- Native name: Сергей Владимирович Добрин
- Full name: Sergei Vladimirovich Dobrin
- Born: 22 September 1986 (age 40) Lipetsk, Russian SFSR, Soviet Union
- Height: 1.80 m (5 ft 11 in)

Figure skating career
- Country: Russia
- Skating club: Trade Union Club
- Began skating: 1991
- Retired: 2010
Medal record
Representing Russia
Figure skating: Men's singles
World Junior Championships
Bronze medal – third place	2005 Kitchener	Men's singles
Junior Grand Prix Final
Silver medal – second place	2000–01 Ayr	Men's singles
Silver medal – second place	2002–03 The Hague	Men's singles
European Youth Olympic Festival
Gold medal – first place	2003 Bled	Men's singles

Sergei Vladimirovich Dobrin (Russian: Серге́й Владимирович Добрин, born 22 September 1986) is a Russian former competitive figure skater. He is the 2005 World Junior bronze medalist and a two-time ISU Junior Grand Prix Final silver medalist. On the senior level, he won bronze medals at the 2006 Trophée Éric Bompard, 2006 Finlandia Trophy, and two Russian Championships (2006 and 2007).

== Personal life ==
Dobrin was born on 22 September 1986 in Lipetsk and has a sister, Maria, who is 18 years younger. He learned ballroom dancing from age 7 to 10.

== Career ==
Dobrin started skating in 1991 and trained in Lipetsk until the age of 11. He then relocated to Moscow at the invitation of Zhanna Gromova. She would coach him until 2007.

Dobrin debuted on the ISU Junior Grand Prix (JGP) series in September 2000. After winning silver medals in Ukraine and the Czech Republic, he qualified for the JGP Final in Ayr, Scotland, where he also took silver. After winning the Russian junior title, he was sent to the 2001 World Junior Championships in Sofia, Bulgaria. He placed 5th in his qualifying group, 20th in the short program, 12th in the free skate, and 12th overall.

During the 2002–03 JPG season, Dobrin was awarded gold at both of his assignments – Chemnitz, Germany and Milan, Italy – and silver at the JGP Final in The Hague, Netherlands. He won silver at the Russian Junior Championships and gold at the 2003 European Youth Olympic Festival in Bled, Slovenia. He finished 5th at the 2003 World Junior Championships in Ostrava, Czech Republic, after ranking fourth in his qualifying group, second in the short, and sixth in the free.

In early March 2005, Dobrin won the bronze medal at the World Junior Championships in Kitchener, Ontario, Canada. His senior international debut came later that month, at the 2005 World Championships in Moscow; he placed 5th in his qualifying group, 15th in the short, 15th in the free, and 17th overall.

Dobrin received his first Grand Prix assignments in the 2005–06 season. After placing 7th at the 2005 Trophée Éric Bompard and 10th at the 2005 Cup of Russia, he won his first senior national medal, bronze, at the 2006 Russian Championships. Ranked 14th in the short and 17th in the free, he finished 15th at the 2006 European Championships in Lyon, France.

Dobrin began the 2006–07 season with a bronze medal at the 2006 Finlandia Trophy. Competing in the Grand Prix series, he won bronze at the 2006 Trophée Éric Bompard and placed 8th at the 2006 Cup of Russia. He was awarded bronze at the 2007 Russian Championships and placed 18th at the 2007 European Championships in Warsaw after ranking 15th in the short and 19th in the free.

In August 2007, Dobrin relocated to Saint Petersburg to train under Alexei Mishin. He placed 5th at the 2007 NHK Trophy. He withdrew from the 2008 Russian Championships and finished 13th at the 2009 Russian Championships. In 2009, he left Mishin and joined Victoria Volchkova in Moscow. After placing 12th at the 2010 Russian Championships, Dobrin retired from competition. He worked as a coach in Prokopyevsk, Kemerovo Oblast from 2011 to 2014 and then relocated to Krasnodar.

== Programs ==
Season	Short program	Free skating
2007–08	The Firebird by Igor Stravinsky	The Mask of Zorro by James Horner
2005–07	Sarabande by George Frideric Handel (modern arrangement)	The Mask of Zorro by James Horner
2004–05	Black Cat, White Cat by Goran Bregović	Faust by Charles Gounod
2003–04	Freedom to Move (Suite No. 4 in D-minor) by George Frideric Handel	The Phantom of the Opera on Ice by Robert Danova
2002–03	Duel by Bond	Variations on a Theme of Paganini by Sergei Rachmaninoff
2001–02		Variations on a Theme of Paganini by Sergei Rachmaninoff
2000–01	Toccata by Johann Sebastian Bach	Don Quixote by Ludwig Minkus

== Competitive highlights ==
GP: Grand Prix; JGP: Junior Grand Prix

International
Event	99–00	00–01	01–02	02–03	03–04	04–05	05–06	06–07	07–08	08–09	09–10
Worlds						17th					
Europeans							15th	18th			
GP Bompard							7th	3rd			
GP Cup of Russia							10th	8th			
GP NHK Trophy									5th		
Finlandia Trophy								3rd			
International: Junior
Junior Worlds		12th		5th	8th	3rd					
JGP Final		2nd		2nd	5th	5th					
JGP Bulgaria			7th								
JGP Croatia					3rd						
JGP Czech Rep.		2nd			2nd						
JGP Germany				1st							
JGP Italy				1st							
JGP Romania						2nd					
JGP Serbia						3rd					
JGP Sweden			6th								
JGP Ukraine		2nd									
EYOF				1st							
National
Russian Champ.			9th	7th	6th	5th	3rd	3rd	WD	13th	12th
Russian Junior	9th	1st	6th	2nd	2nd	3rd					
WD: Withdrew
