= Four Continents Figure Skating Championships =

Annual figure skating competition

- Status: Active
- Genre: International championship event
- Frequency: Annual
- Inaugurated: 1999
- Previous event: 2026 Four Continents Championships
- Next event: 2027 Four Continents Championships
- Organizer: International Skating Union

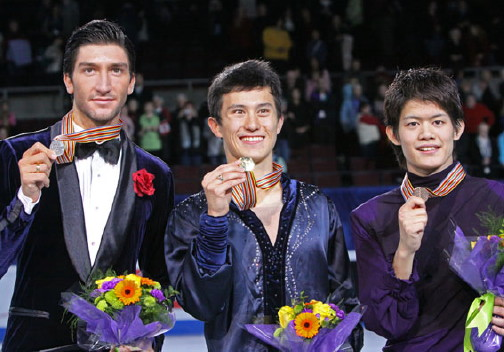
The gold, silver, and bronze medalists in the men's event at the 2009 Four Continents Championships: Patrick Chan of Canada (center), Evan Lysacek of the United States (left), and Takahiko Kozuka of Japan (right)

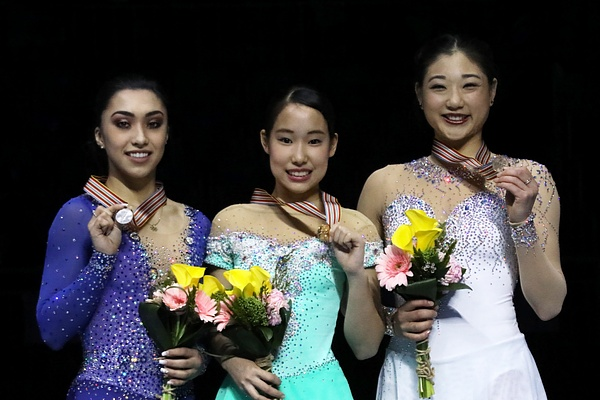
The gold, silver, and bronze medalists in the women's event at the 2017 Four Continents Championships: Mai Mihara of Japan (center), Gabrielle Daleman of Canada (left), and Mirai Nagasu of the United States (right)

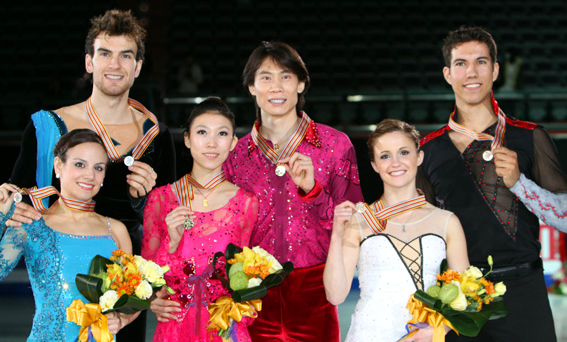
The gold, silver, and bronze medalists in the pairs event at the 2011 Four Continents Championships: Pang Qing and Tong Jian of China (center), Meagan Duhamel and Eric Radford of Canada (left), and Paige Lawrence and Rudi Swiegers of Canada (right)

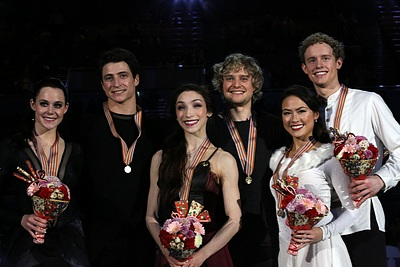
The gold, silver, and bronze medalists in the ice dance event at the 2013 Four Continents Championships: Meryl Davis and Charlie White of the United States (center), Tessa Virtue and Scott Moir of Canada (left), and Madison Chock and Evan Bates of the United States (right)

The Four Continents Figure Skating Championships are an annual figure skating competition sanctioned by the International Skating Union (ISU). Medals are awarded in men's singles, women's singles, pair skating, and ice dance. The ISU established the Four Continents Championships to provide skaters from non-European countries with a similar competition to the European Figure Skating Championships. The first Four Continents Championships were held in 1999 in Halifax, Canada. Only eligible skaters from ISU member countries in Africa, Asia, North America, Oceania, and South America are allowed to compete.

Patrick Chan of Canada holds the record for winning the most Four Continents Championship titles in men's singles (with three), while Mao Asada and Fumie Suguri of Japan are tied for winning the most championships in women's singles (with three each). Sui Wenjing and Han Cong of China hold the record in pair skating (with six). Five teams are tied for winning the most titles in ice dance (with three each): Shae-Lynn Bourne and Victor Kraatz of Canada; Tanith Belbin and Benjamin Agosto of the United States; Meryl Davis and Charlie White of the United States; Tessa Virtue and Scott Moir of Canada; and Madison Chock and Evan Bates of the United States.

== History ==
From 1923 to 1971, skaters from Canada and the United States competed at the biennial North American Figure Skating Championships. This allowed Canadian and American skaters the opportunity to compete at a comparable event to the European Figure Skating Championships. At this time, medal contenders at the World Figure Skating Championships and the Winter Olympics came from either Europe or North America. However, by the mid-1970s, skaters from Asia were also successfully competing at major international events. The last North American Championships were held in 1971, so skaters from Europe had the advantage of an International Skating Union (ISU) championship event that was not accessible to skaters outside of Europe. In order to provide equal opportunities for all skaters, the ISU established the Four Continents Championships in 1999. The name referred to the four continents outside of Europe where competitive figure skating took place: Africa, Asia, Australia (Oceania), and North America. At this time, there were no ISU member nations in South America; Brazil was admitted as the first South American member nation in 2002.

The inaugural Four Continents Championships took place in Halifax, Canada, in 1999. Takeshi Honda of Japan won the men's event, while Tatiana Malinina of Uzbekistan won the women's event. Shen Xue and Zhao Hongbo of China won the pairs event, and Shae-Lynn Bourne and Victor Kraatz of Canada won the ice dance event. The Four Continents Championships have been held every year since, except for 2021, when the championships were cancelled on account of the COVID-19 pandemic.

The 2022 Four Continents Championships were originally scheduled to be held in Tianjin, China, but the Chinese Skating Association cancelled the event on account of the COVID-19 pandemic. When the ISU could not find a suitable replacement host among non-European nations, they asked the Estonian Skating Union to host the event, as Estonia was also hosting the 2022 European Championships in Tallinn. The 2022 Four Continents Championships took place one week after the European Championships at the same venue, marking the first and only time that the Four Continents Championships were held in Europe.

The 2027 Four Continents Championships are scheduled to be held from February 9 to 14 in Astana, Kazakhstan.

== Qualifying ==
Only those competitors who are "members of a non-European ISU Member" are eligible to compete in the Four Continents Championships. Unlike the European Championships, where member nations are only entitled to enter one competitor or team per discipline, but with requirements that must be met in order to submit additional competitors, the Four Continents Championships allow member nations to enter up to three competitors or teams per discipline.

Until the 2023–24 figure skating season, skaters had to be at least 15 years old before July 1 of the previous year. At the ISU Congress held in June 2022, members of the ISU Council accepted a proposal to gradually increase the minimum age limit for senior competition to 17 years old beginning from the 2024–25 season. To avoid forcing skaters who had already competed in the senior category to return to juniors, the age limit remained unchanged during the 2022–23 season, before increasing to 16 years old during the 2023–24 season, and then to 17 years old during the 2024–25 season.

As of 2025, the following countries are eligible to send skaters to the Four Continents Championships: Argentina, Australia, Brazil, Canada, Chile, China, Ecuador, Egypt, Hong Kong, India, Indonesia, Japan, Kazakhstan, Kuwait, Kyrgyzstan, Malaysia, Mexico, Mongolia, Morocco, New Zealand, North Korea, Peru, the Philippines, Singapore, South Africa, South Korea, Taiwan (Chinese Taipei), Thailand, Turkmenistan, the United Arab Emirates, the United States, Uzbekistan, and Vietnam.

== Medalists ==
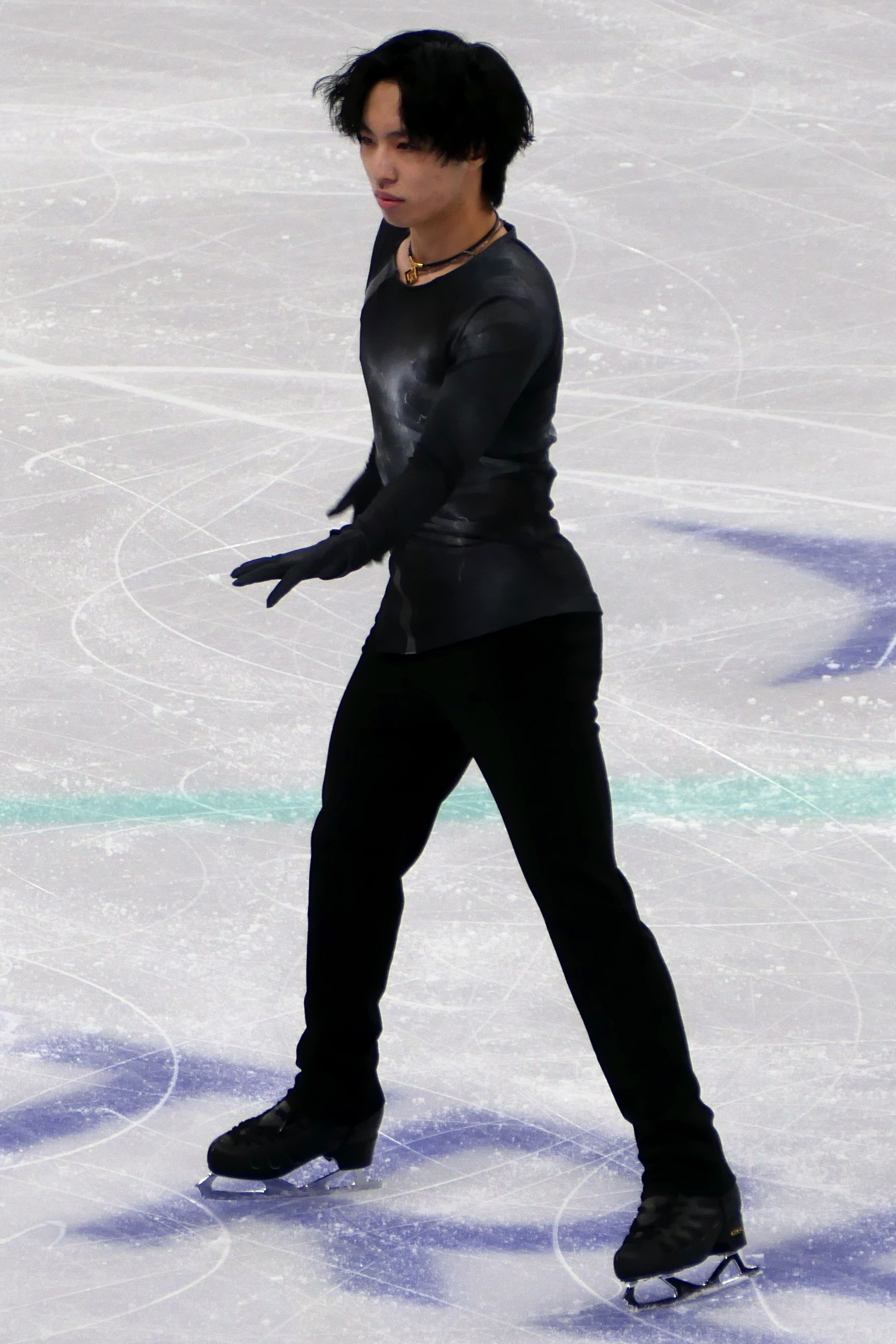
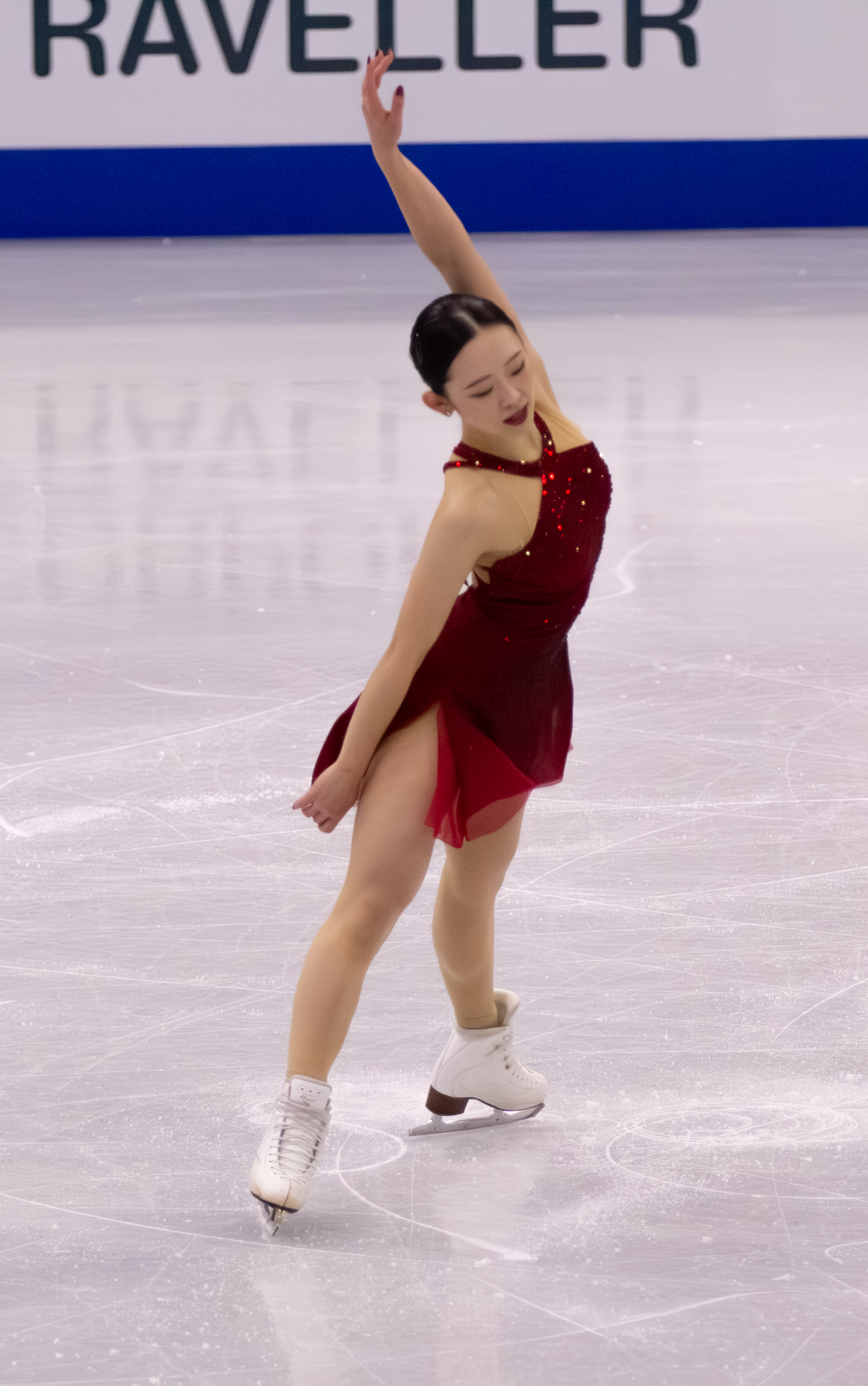
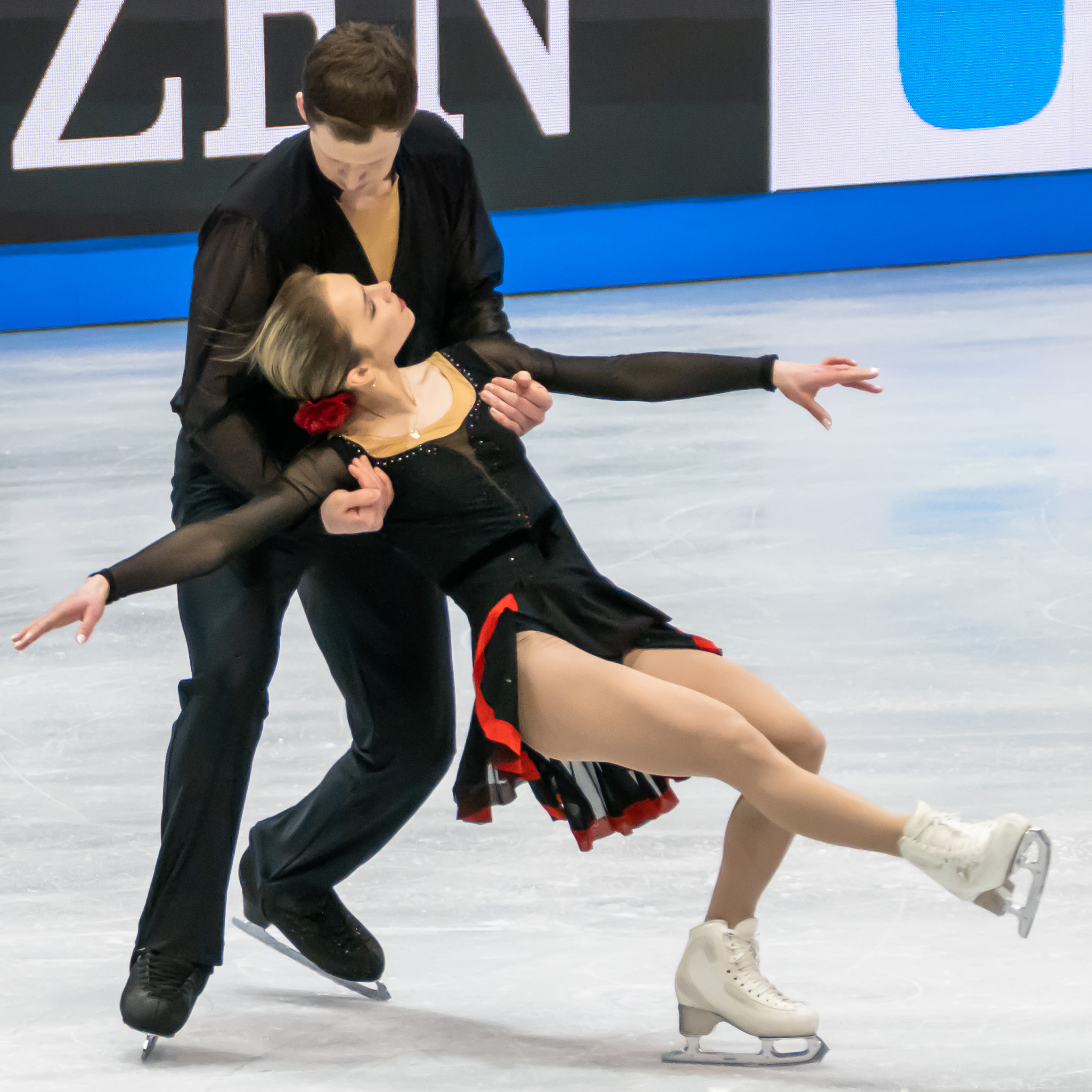
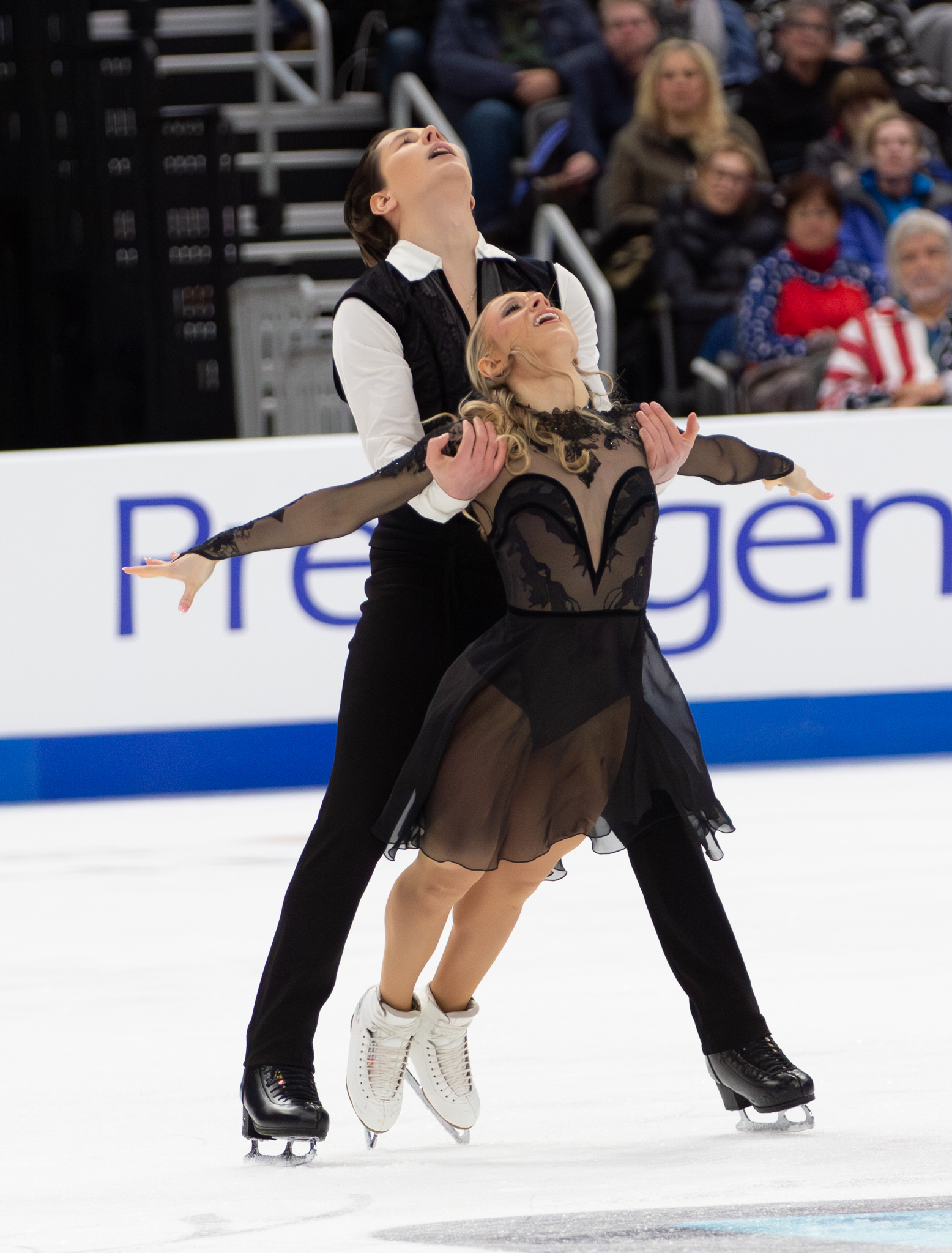
The reigning Four Continents figure skating champions: Kao Miura of Japan (men's singles); Yuna Aoki of Japan (women's singles); Alisa Efimova and Misha Mitrofanov of the United States (pair skating); and Emilea Zingas and Vadym Kolesnik of the United States (ice dance)

=== Men's singles ===
Men's event medalists
Year	Location	Gold	Silver	Bronze	Ref.
1999	(Canada) Halifax	(Japan) Takeshi Honda	(China) Li Chengjiang	(Canada) Elvis Stojko	
2000	(Japan) Osaka	(Canada) Elvis Stojko	(China) Li Chengjiang	(China) Zhang Min	
2001	(United States) Salt Lake City	(China) Li Chengjiang	(Japan) Takeshi Honda	(United States) Michael Weiss	
2002	(South Korea) Jeonju	(Canada) Jeffrey Buttle	(Japan) Takeshi Honda	(China) Gao Song	
2003	(China) Beijing	(Japan) Takeshi Honda	(China) Zhang Min	(China) Li Chengjiang	
2004	(Canada) Hamilton	(Canada) Jeffrey Buttle	(Canada) Emanuel Sandhu	(United States) Evan Lysacek	
2005	(South Korea) Gangneung	(United States) Evan Lysacek	(China) Li Chengjiang	(Japan) Daisuke Takahashi	
2006	(United States) Colorado Springs	(Japan) Nobunari Oda	(Canada) Christopher Mabee	(United States) Matthew Savoie	
2007	(United States) Colorado Springs	(United States) Evan Lysacek	(Canada) Jeffrey Buttle	(United States) Jeremy Abbott	
2008	(South Korea) Goyang	(Japan) Daisuke Takahashi	(Canada) Jeffrey Buttle	(United States) Evan Lysacek	
2009	(Canada) Vancouver	(Canada) Patrick Chan	(United States) Evan Lysacek	(Japan) Takahiko Kozuka	
2010	(South Korea) Jeonju	(United States) Adam Rippon	(Japan) Tatsuki Machida	(Canada) Kevin Reynolds	
2011	(Taiwan) Taipei City	(Japan) Daisuke Takahashi	(Japan) Yuzuru Hanyu	(United States) Jeremy Abbott	
2012	(United States) Colorado Springs	(Canada) Patrick Chan	(Japan) Daisuke Takahashi	(United States) Ross Miner	
2013	(Japan) Osaka	(Canada) Kevin Reynolds	(Japan) Yuzuru Hanyu	(China) Yan Han	
2014	(Taiwan) Taipei City	(Japan) Takahito Mura	(Japan) Takahiko Kozuka	(China) Song Nan	
2015	(South Korea) Seoul	(Kazakhstan) Denis Ten	(United States) Joshua Farris	(China) Yan Han	
2016	(Taiwan) Taipei City	(Canada) Patrick Chan	(China) Jin Boyang	(China) Yan Han	
2017	(South Korea) Gangneung	(United States) Nathan Chen	(Japan) Yuzuru Hanyu	(Japan) Shoma Uno	
2018	(Taiwan) Taipei City	(China) Jin Boyang	(Japan) Shoma Uno	(United States) Jason Brown	
2019	(United States) Anaheim	(Japan) Shoma Uno	(China) Jin Boyang	(United States) Vincent Zhou	
2020	(South Korea) Seoul	(Japan) Yuzuru Hanyu	(United States) Jason Brown	(Japan) Yuma Kagiyama	
2021	(Australia) Sydney	Competition cancelled due to the COVID-19 pandemic			
2022	(Estonia) Tallinn	(South Korea) Cha Jun-hwan	(Japan) Kazuki Tomono	(Japan) Kao Miura	
2023	(United States) Colorado Springs	(Japan) Kao Miura	(Canada) Keegan Messing	(Japan) Shun Sato	
2024	(China) Shanghai	(Japan) Yuma Kagiyama	(Japan) Shun Sato	(South Korea) Cha Jun-hwan	
2025	(South Korea) Seoul	(Kazakhstan) Mikhail Shaidorov	(South Korea) Cha Jun-hwan	(United States) Jimmy Ma	
2026	(China) Beijing	(Japan) Kao Miura	(South Korea) Cha Jun-hwan	(Japan) Sōta Yamamoto	

=== Women's singles ===
Women's event medalists
Year	Location	Gold	Silver	Bronze	Ref.
1999	(Canada) Halifax	(Uzbekistan) Tatiana Malinina	(United States) Amber Corwin	(United States) Angela Nikodinov	
2000	(Japan) Osaka	(United States) Angela Nikodinov	(United States) Stacey Pensgen	(Canada) Annie Bellemare	
2001	(United States) Salt Lake City	(Japan) Fumie Suguri	(United States) Angela Nikodinov	(Japan) Yoshie Onda	
2002	(South Korea) Jeonju	(United States) Jennifer Kirk	(Japan) Shizuka Arakawa	(Japan) Yoshie Onda	
2003	(China) Beijing	(Japan) Fumie Suguri	(Japan) Shizuka Arakawa	(Japan) Yukari Nakano	
2004	(Canada) Hamilton	(Japan) Yukina Ota	(Canada) Cynthia Phaneuf	(United States) Amber Corwin	
2005	(South Korea) Gangneung	(Japan) Fumie Suguri	(Japan) Yoshie Onda	(United States) Jennifer Kirk	
2006	(United States) Colorado Springs	(United States) Katy Taylor	(Japan) Yukari Nakano	(United States) Beatrisa Liang	
2007	(United States) Colorado Springs	(United States) Kimmie Meissner	(United States) Emily Hughes	(Canada) Joannie Rochette	
2008	(South Korea) Goyang	(Japan) Mao Asada	(Canada) Joannie Rochette	(Japan) Miki Ando	
2009	(Canada) Vancouver	(South Korea) Yuna Kim	(Canada) Joannie Rochette	(Japan) Mao Asada	
2010	(South Korea) Jeonju	(Japan) Mao Asada	(Japan) Akiko Suzuki	(United States) Caroline Zhang	
2011	(Taiwan) Taipei City	(Japan) Miki Ando	(Japan) Mao Asada	(United States) Mirai Nagasu	
2012	(United States) Colorado Springs	(United States) Ashley Wagner	(Japan) Mao Asada	(United States) Caroline Zhang	
2013	(Japan) Osaka	(Japan) Mao Asada	(Japan) Akiko Suzuki	(Japan) Kanako Murakami	
2014	(Taiwan) Taipei City	(Japan) Kanako Murakami	(Japan) Satoko Miyahara	(China) Li Zijun	
2015	(South Korea) Seoul	(United States) Polina Edmunds	(Japan) Satoko Miyahara	(Japan) Rika Hongo	
2016	(Taiwan) Taipei City	(Japan) Satoko Miyahara	(United States) Mirai Nagasu	(Japan) Rika Hongo	
2017	(South Korea) Gangneung	(Japan) Mai Mihara	(Canada) Gabrielle Daleman	(United States) Mirai Nagasu	
2018	(Taiwan) Taipei City	(Japan) Kaori Sakamoto	(Japan) Mai Mihara	(Japan) Satoko Miyahara	
2019	(United States) Anaheim	(Japan) Rika Kihira	(Kazakhstan) Elizabet Tursynbaeva	(Japan) Mai Mihara	
2020	(South Korea) Seoul	(Japan) Rika Kihira	(South Korea) You Young	(United States) Bradie Tennell	
2021	(Australia) Sydney	Competition cancelled due to the COVID-19 pandemic			
2022	(Estonia) Tallinn	(Japan) Mai Mihara	(South Korea) Lee Hae-in	(South Korea) Kim Ye-lim	
2023	(United States) Colorado Springs	(South Korea) Lee Hae-in	(South Korea) Kim Ye-lim	(Japan) Mone Chiba	
2024	(China) Shanghai	(Japan) Mone Chiba	(South Korea) Kim Chae-yeon	(Japan) Rinka Watanabe	
2025	(South Korea) Seoul	(South Korea) Kim Chae-yeon	(United States) Bradie Tennell	(United States) Sarah Everhardt	
2026	(China) Beijing	(Japan) Yuna Aoki	(Japan) Ami Nakai	(Japan) Mone Chiba	

=== Pairs ===
Pairs event medalists
Year	Location	Gold	Silver	Bronze	Ref.
1999	(Canada) Halifax	(China); Shen Xue; Zhao Hongbo	(Canada); Kristy Sargeant; Kris Wirtz	(United States); Danielle Hartsell; Steve Hartsell	
2000	(Japan) Osaka	(Canada); Jamie Salé; David Pelletier	(United States); Kyoko Ina; John Zimmerman	(United States); Tiffany Scott; Philip Dulebohn	
2001	(United States) Salt Lake City	(Canada); Jamie Salé; David Pelletier	(China); Shen Xue; Zhao Hongbo	(United States); Kyoko Ina; John Zimmerman	
2002	(South Korea) Jeonju	(China); Pang Qing; Tong Jian	(Canada); Anabelle Langlois; Patrice Archetto	(China); Zhang Dan; Zhang Hao	
2003	(China) Beijing	(China); Shen Xue; Zhao Hongbo	(China); Pang Qing; Tong Jian	(China); Zhang Dan; Zhang Hao	
2004	(Canada) Hamilton	(China); Pang Qing; Tong Jian	(China); Zhang Dan; Zhang Hao	(Canada); Valérie Marcoux; Craig Buntin	
2005	(South Korea) Gangneung	(China); Zhang Dan; Zhang Hao	(China); Pang Qing; Tong Jian	(United States); Kathryn Orscher; Garrett Lucash	
2006	(United States) Colorado Springs	(United States); Rena Inoue; John Baldwin	(Canada); Utako Wakamatsu; Jean-Sébastien Fecteau	(Canada); Elizabeth Putnam; Sean Wirtz	
2007	(United States) Colorado Springs	(China); Shen Xue; Zhao Hongbo	(China); Pang Qing; Tong Jian	(United States); Rena Inoue; John Baldwin	
2008	(South Korea) Goyang	(China); Pang Qing; Tong Jian	(China); Zhang Dan; Zhang Hao	(United States); Brooke Castile; Benjamin Okolski	
2009	(Canada) Vancouver	(China); Pang Qing; Tong Jian	(Canada); Jessica Dubé; Bryce Davison	(China); Zhang Dan; Zhang Hao	
2010	(South Korea) Jeonju	(China); Zhang Dan; Zhang Hao	(United States); Keauna McLaughlin; Rockne Brubaker	(Canada); Meagan Duhamel; Craig Buntin	
2011	(Taiwan) Taipei City	(China); Pang Qing; Tong Jian	(Canada); Meagan Duhamel; Eric Radford	(Canada); Paige Lawrence; Rudi Swiegers	
2012	(United States) Colorado Springs	(China); Sui Wenjing; Han Cong	(United States); Caydee Denney; John Coughlin	(United States); Mary Beth Marley; Rockne Brubaker	
2013	(Japan) Osaka	(Canada); Meagan Duhamel; Eric Radford	(Canada); Kirsten Moore-Towers; Dylan Moscovitch	(United States); Marissa Castelli; Simon Shnapir	
2014	(Taiwan) Taipei City	(China); Sui Wenjing; Han Cong	(United States); Tarah Kayne; Danny O'Shea	(United States); Alexa Scimeca; Chris Knierim	
2015	(South Korea) Seoul	(Canada); Meagan Duhamel; Eric Radford	(China); Peng Cheng; Zhang Hao	(China); Pang Qing; Tong Jian	
2016	(Taiwan) Taipei City	(China); Sui Wenjing; Han Cong	(United States); Alexa Scimeca; Chris Knierim	(China); Yu Xiaoyu; Jin Yang	
2017	(South Korea) Gangneung	(China); Sui Wenjing; Han Cong	(Canada); Meagan Duhamel; Eric Radford	(Canada); Liubov Ilyushechkina; Dylan Moscovitch	
2018	(Taiwan) Taipei City	(United States); Tarah Kayne; Danny O'Shea	(United States); Ashley Cain; Timothy LeDuc	(North Korea); Ryom Tae-ok; Kim Ju-sik	
2019	(United States) Anaheim	(China); Sui Wenjing; Han Cong	(Canada); Kirsten Moore-Towers; Michael Marinaro	(China); Peng Cheng; Jin Yang	
2020	(South Korea) Seoul	(China); Sui Wenjing; Han Cong	(China); Peng Cheng; Jin Yang	(Canada); Kirsten Moore-Towers; Michael Marinaro	
2021	(Australia) Sydney	Competition cancelled due to the COVID-19 pandemic			
2022	(Estonia) Tallinn	(United States); Audrey Lu; Misha Mitrofanov	(United States); Emily Chan; Spencer Akira Howe	(Canada); Evelyn Walsh; Trennt Michaud	
2023	(United States) Colorado Springs	(Japan); Riku Miura; Ryuichi Kihara	(United States); Emily Chan; Spencer Akira Howe	(Canada); Deanna Stellato-Dudek; Maxime Deschamps	
2024	(China) Shanghai	(Canada); Deanna Stellato-Dudek; Maxime Deschamps	(Japan); Riku Miura; Ryuichi Kihara	(United States); Ellie Kam; Danny O'Shea	
2025	(South Korea) Seoul	(Japan); Riku Miura; Ryuichi Kihara	(Canada); Deanna Stellato-Dudek; Maxime Deschamps	(Canada); Lia Pereira; Trennt Michaud	
2026	(China) Beijing	(United States); Alisa Efimova; Misha Mitrofanov	(China); Sui Wenjing; Han Cong	(Japan); Yuna Nagaoka; Sumitada Moriguchi	

=== Ice dance ===
Ice dance event medalists
Year	Location	Gold	Silver	Bronze	Ref.
1999	(Canada) Halifax	(Canada); Shae-Lynn Bourne; Victor Kraatz	(Canada); Chantal Lefebvre; Michel Brunet	(United States); Naomi Lang; Peter Tchernyshev	
2000	(Japan) Osaka	(United States); Naomi Lang; Peter Tchernyshev	(Canada); Marie-France Dubreuil; Patrice Lauzon	(United States); Jamie Silverstein; Justin Pekarek	
2001	(United States) Salt Lake City	(Canada); Shae-Lynn Bourne; Victor Kraatz	(United States); Naomi Lang; Peter Tchernyshev	(Canada); Marie-France Dubreuil; Patrice Lauzon	
2002	(South Korea) Jeonju	(United States); Naomi Lang; Peter Tchernyshev	(United States); Tanith Belbin; Benjamin Agosto	(Canada); Megan Wing; Aaron Lowe	
2003	(China) Beijing	(Canada); Shae-Lynn Bourne; Victor Kraatz	(United States); Tanith Belbin; Benjamin Agosto	(United States); Naomi Lang; Peter Tchernyshev	
2004	(Canada) Hamilton	(United States); Tanith Belbin; Benjamin Agosto	(Canada); Marie-France Dubreuil; Patrice Lauzon	(Canada); Megan Wing; Aaron Lowe	
2005	(South Korea) Gangneung	(United States); Tanith Belbin; Benjamin Agosto	(United States); Melissa Gregory; Denis Petukhov	(United States); Lydia Manon; Ryan O'Meara	
2006	(United States) Colorado Springs	(United States); Tanith Belbin; Benjamin Agosto	(United States); Morgan Matthews; Maxim Zavozin	(Canada); Tessa Virtue; Scott Moir	
2007	(United States) Colorado Springs	(Canada); Marie-France Dubreuil; Patrice Lauzon	(United States); Tanith Belbin; Benjamin Agosto	(Canada); Tessa Virtue; Scott Moir	
2008	(South Korea) Goyang	(Canada); Tessa Virtue; Scott Moir	(United States); Meryl Davis; Charlie White	(United States); Kimberly Navarro; Brent Bommentre	
2009	(Canada) Vancouver	(United States); Meryl Davis; Charlie White	(Canada); Tessa Virtue; Scott Moir	(United States); Emily Samuelson; Evan Bates	
2010	(South Korea) Jeonju	(Canada); Kaitlyn Weaver; Andrew Poje	(Canada); Allie Hann-McCurdy; Michael Coreno	(United States); Madison Hubbell; Keiffer Hubbell	
2011	(Taiwan) Taipei City	(United States); Meryl Davis; Charlie White	(United States); Maia Shibutani; Alex Shibutani	(Canada); Vanessa Crone; Paul Poirier	
2012	(United States) Colorado Springs	(Canada); Tessa Virtue; Scott Moir	(United States); Meryl Davis; Charlie White	(Canada); Kaitlyn Weaver; Andrew Poje	
2013	(Japan) Osaka	(United States); Meryl Davis; Charlie White	(Canada); Tessa Virtue; Scott Moir	(United States); Madison Chock; Evan Bates	
2014	(Taiwan) Taipei City	(United States); Madison Hubbell; Zachary Donohue	(Canada); Piper Gilles; Paul Poirier	(United States); Alexandra Aldridge; Daniel Eaton	
2015	(South Korea) Seoul	(Canada); Kaitlyn Weaver; Andrew Poje	(United States); Madison Chock; Evan Bates	(United States); Maia Shibutani; Alex Shibutani	
2016	(Taiwan) Taipei City	(United States); Maia Shibutani; Alex Shibutani	(United States); Madison Chock; Evan Bates	(Canada); Kaitlyn Weaver; Andrew Poje	
2017	(South Korea) Gangneung	(Canada); Tessa Virtue; Scott Moir	(United States); Maia Shibutani; Alex Shibutani	(United States); Madison Chock; Evan Bates	
2018	(Taiwan) Taipei City	(United States); Kaitlin Hawayek; Jean-Luc Baker	(Canada); Carolane Soucisse; Shane Firus	(Japan); Kana Muramoto; Chris Reed	
2019	(United States) Anaheim	(United States); Madison Chock; Evan Bates	(Canada); Kaitlyn Weaver; Andrew Poje	(Canada); Piper Gilles; Paul Poirier	
2020	(South Korea) Seoul	(United States); Madison Chock; Evan Bates	(Canada); Piper Gilles; Paul Poirier	(United States); Madison Hubbell; Zachary Donohue	
2021	(Australia) Sydney	Competition cancelled due to the COVID-19 pandemic			
2022	(Estonia) Tallinn	(United States); Caroline Green; Michael Parsons	(Japan); Kana Muramoto; Daisuke Takahashi	(United States); Christina Carreira; Anthony Ponomarenko	
2023	(United States) Colorado Springs	(United States); Madison Chock; Evan Bates	(Canada); Laurence Fournier Beaudry; Nikolaj Sørensen	(Canada); Marjorie Lajoie; Zachary Lagha	
2024	(China) Shanghai	(Canada); Piper Gilles; Paul Poirier	(Canada); Laurence Fournier Beaudry; Nikolaj Sørensen	(United States); Christina Carreira; Anthony Ponomarenko	
2025	(South Korea) Seoul	(Canada); Piper Gilles; Paul Poirier	(United States); Madison Chock; Evan Bates	(Canada); Marjorie Lajoie; Zachary Lagha	
2026	(China) Beijing	(United States); Emilea Zingas; Vadym Kolesnik	(United States); Caroline Green; Michael Parsons	(United States); Oona Brown; Gage Brown	

== Records ==
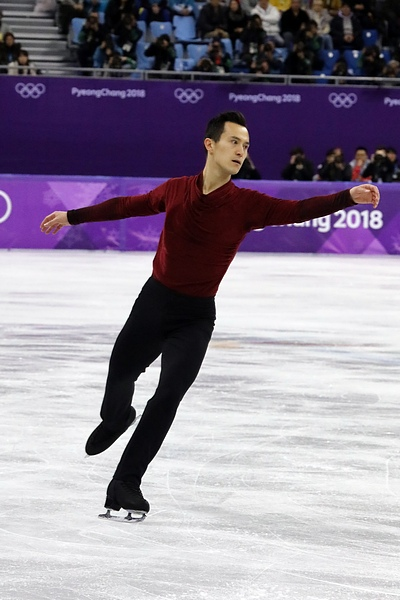
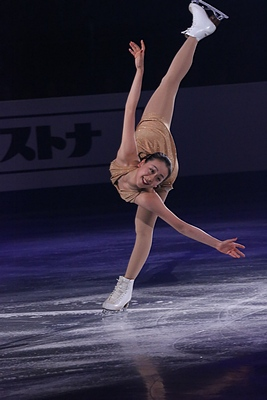
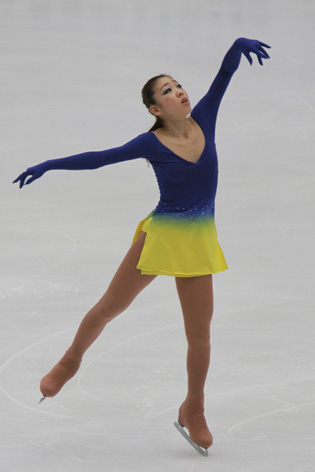
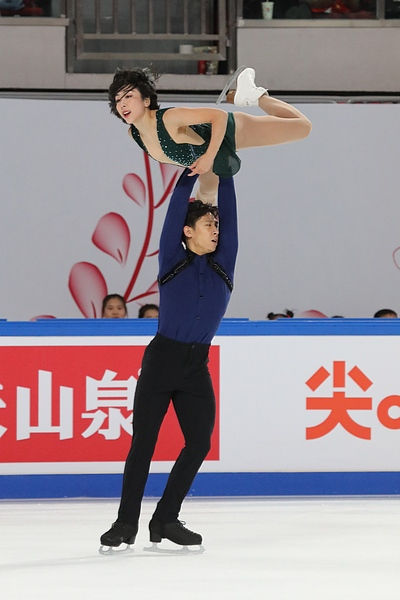
From left to right: Patrick Chan of Canada has won three Four Continents Championship titles in men's singles; Mao Asada and Fumie Suguri, both of Japan, have each won three Four Continents Championship titles in women's singles; and Sui Wenjing and Han Cong of China have won six Four Continents Championship titles in pair skating.
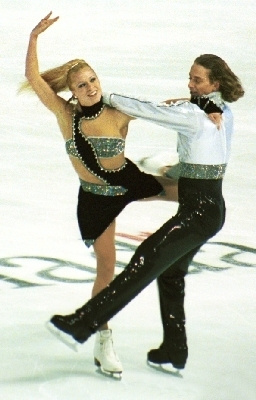
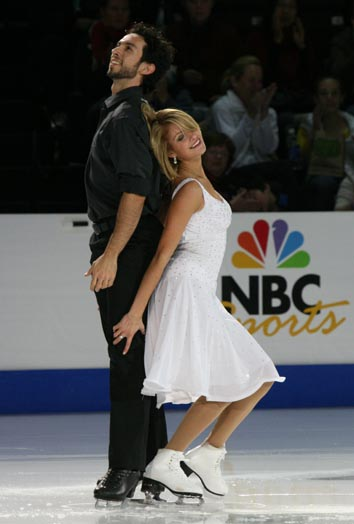
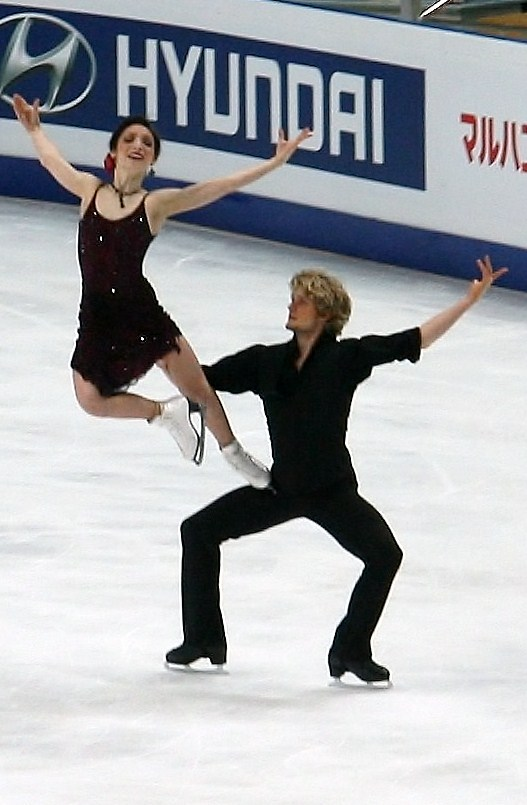
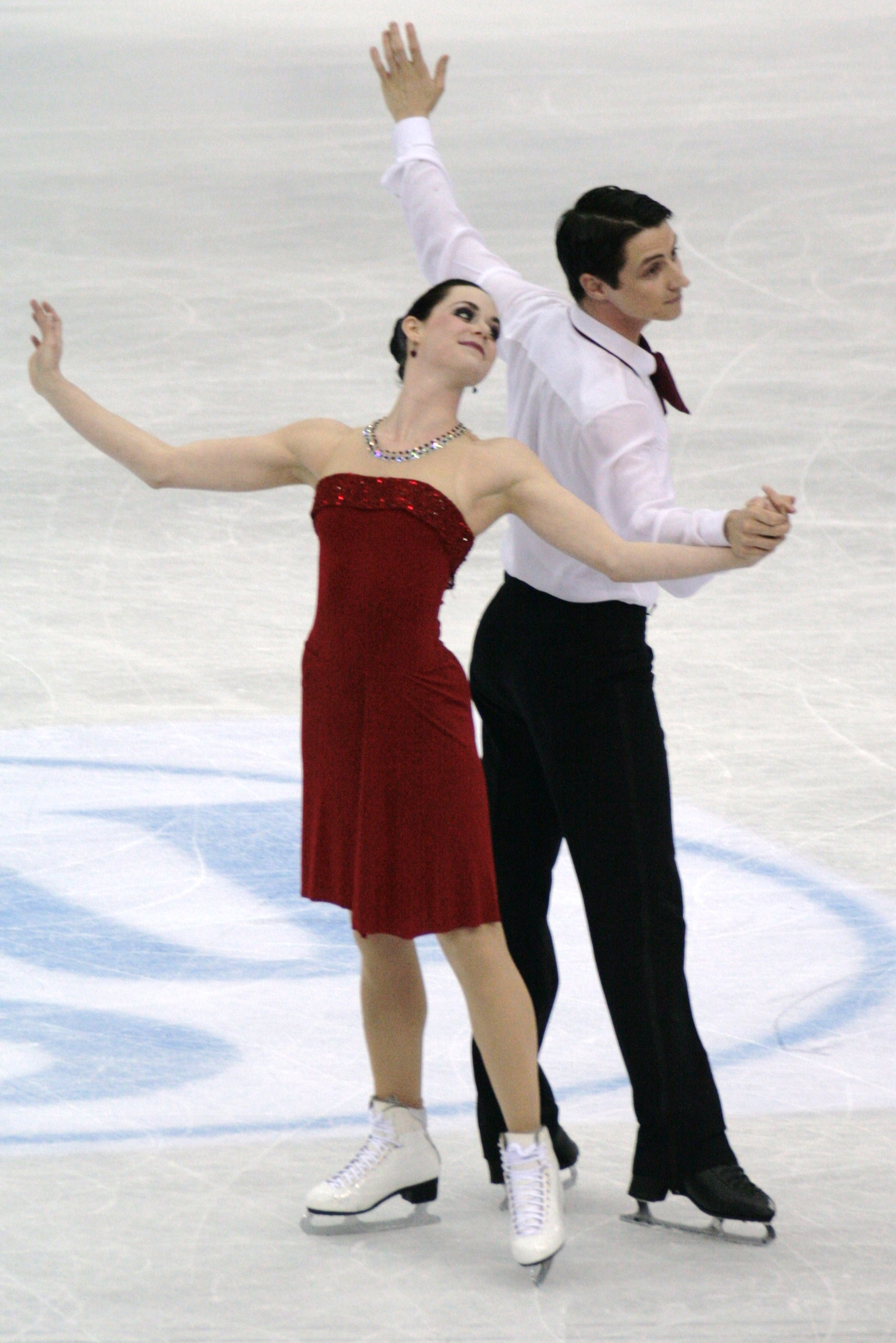
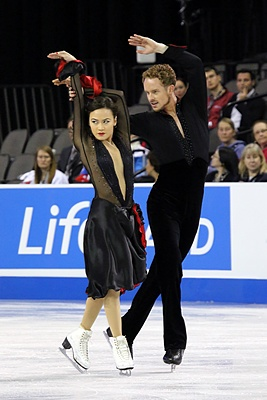
Five teams are tied for the winning the most Four Continents Championship titles in ice dance (with three each). From left to right: Shae-Lynn Bourne and Victor Kraatz of Canada; Tanith Belbin and Benjamin Agosto of the United States; Meryl Davis and Charlie White of the United States; Tessa Virtue and Scott Moir of Canada; and Madison Chock and Evan Bates of the United States

Records
Discipline	Most championship titles			
Discipline	Skater(s)	No.	Years	Ref.
Men's singles	(Canada); Patrick Chan	3	2009; 2012; 2016	
Women's singles	(Japan); Mao Asada	3	2009; 2012; 2013	
Women's singles	(Japan); Fumie Suguri	3	2001; 2003; 2005	
Pairs	(China); Sui Wenjing; Han Cong	6	2012; 2014; 2016–17; 2019–20	
Ice dance	(United States); Tanith Belbin; Benjamin Agosto	3	2004–06	
Ice dance	(Canada); Shae-Lynn Bourne; Victor Kraatz	3	1999; 2001; 2003	
Ice dance	(United States); Madison Chock; Evan Bates	3	2019–20; 2023	
Ice dance	(United States); Meryl Davis; Charlie White	3	2009; 2011; 2013	
Ice dance	(Canada); Tessa Virtue; Scott Moir	3	2008; 2012; 2017	

== Cumulative medal count ==
Total number of Four Continents Championship medals by nation
Rank	Nation	Gold	Silver	Bronze	Total
1	United States	30	31	45	106
2	Japan	30	25	22	77
3	Canada	23	30	24	77
4	China	18	15	14	47
5	South Korea	4	6	2	12
6	Kazakhstan	2	1	0	3
7	Uzbekistan	1	0	0	1
8	North Korea	0	0	1	1
Totals (8 entries)		108	108	108	324

== See also ==
- Four Continents Figure Skating Championships cumulative medal count
- European Figure Skating Championships
- North American Figure Skating Championships
