= Elizabeth Putnam (figure skater) =

Canadian pair skater

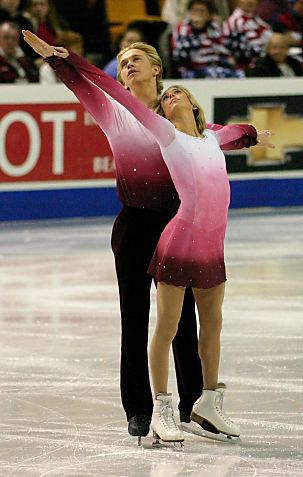
- Elizabeth Putnam / Sean Wirtz in 2004.

Personal information
- Full name: Elizabeth Gale Putnam
- Born: November 28, 1984 (age 41) Toronto, Ontario
- Home town: Vancouver, British Columbia

Figure skating career
- Country: Canada
- Skating club: Kerrisdale FSC
- Began skating: 1989
- Retired: August 28, 2007

Elizabeth Gale Putnam (born November 28, 1984) is a Canadian former competitive pair skater. With Sean Wirtz, she is the 2006 Four Continents bronze medalist and a two-time (2003–04) Canadian national bronze medalist.

== Personal life ==
Elizabeth Gale Putnam was born on November 28, 1984, in Toronto, Ontario, Canada. Her father died in October 2006.

Putnam is married to Canadian skater Patrick Chan. The pair skated in a 2020 free-skate in Vancouver on an untouched plot of glaciered water.

== Career ==
Putnam started skating in 1989. In addition to singles, she began training in pairs at age 15. She finished 9th with Mark Batka at the 2002 Canadian Championships.

=== Partnership with Wirtz ===
Putnam began training with Sean Wirtz in July 2002, following tryouts at the Toronto Cricket and Curling Club. The pair won bronze at the 2003 Canadian Championships and placed ninth at their first ISU Championship, the 2003 Four Continents in Beijing.

Putnam/Wirtz made their Grand Prix debut in the 2003–04 season, having received two assignments. After placing sixth at the 2003 Skate America and fifth at the 2003 Skate Canada International, they won bronze at a regular international, the 2003 Bofrost Cup on Ice. For the second season in a row, they took bronze at the Canadian Championships and finished 9th at the Four Continents Championships.

In the 2004–05 Grand Prix series, Putnam/Wirtz placed fifth at the 2004 Skate America and 8th at the 2004 Cup of Russia. They were fourth at both the 2005 Canadian Championships and 2005 Four Continents Championships.

Competing in the 2005–06 Grand Prix series, Putnam/Wirtz placed fourth at the 2005 Skate America and fifth at the 2005 Cup of Russia. After finishing fifth at the 2006 Canadian Championships, they won the bronze medal at the 2006 Four Continents Championships in Colorado Springs, Colorado.

Their training for the following season was delayed by a visa problem, which prevented Wirtz from returning to New Jersey for a month. Competing in the 2006–07 Grand Prix series, Putnam/Wirtz finished fourth at the 2006 Skate Canada International, two weeks after the death of Putnam's father, and then fourth at the 2006 Trophee Eric Bompard. They were sixth at the 2007 Canadian Nationals.

Their preparations for the 2007–08 season were hampered by injuries. After Wirtz recovered from a broken rib, sustained while skiing in spring 2007, he injured his foot and then the other foot, causing them to withdraw from both of their Grand Prix assignments. Tchernyshev's availability also decreased due to his show commitments. on August 28, 2007, Putnam/Wirtz announced the end of their partnership.

=== Later career ===
Putnam decided to return to single skating, training in Vancouver under Jill Marie Harvey and Joanne McLeod. She later skated on cruise ships with adagio pairs partner Jonathan Poitras. In 2015, she appeared in a video skating on Widgeon Lake, near Coquitlam, at an altitude of 2,500 feet.

== Programs ==
(with Wirtz)

Season	Short program	Free skating	Exhibition
2006–2007	Sing, Sing, Sing by Louis Prima	Piano Concerto No. 1 by Pyotr Tchaikovsky	
2005–2006	Incantation (from Quidam) by Cirque du Soleil	Piano Concerto No. 1 by Pyotr Tchaikovsky	
2004–2005	My Sweet and Tender Beast by Eugen Doga	Moonlight Sonata by Ludwig van Beethoven	
2003–2004	Ave Maria by Johann Sebastian Bach, Charles Gounod	Variations on a Theme of Paganini by Sergei Rachmaninoff	To Where You Are by Josh Groban
2002–2003	Meditation (from Thaïs) by Jules Massenet London Symphonic Orchestra	Violin Fantasie on Puccini's Turandot performed by Vanessa-Mae and the Royal Philharmonic Orchestra; Nessun Dorma (from Turandot) by Giacomo Puccini performed by the BBC Concert Orchestra	To Where You Are by Josh Groban

== Results ==
GP: Grand Prix

=== With Wirtz ===
International
Event	2002–03	2003–04	2004–05	2005–06	2006–07
Four Continents	9th	9th	4th	3rd	
GP Bompard					4th
GP Cup of Russia				5th	
GP Skate America		6th	5th	4th	
GP Skate Canada		5th			4th
Bofrost Cup		3rd			
National
Canadian Champ.	3rd	3rd	4th	5th	6th
WD: Withdrew

=== With Batka ===
National
Event	2001–02
Canadian Championships	9th

=== Single skating ===
National
Event	2002–03	2003–04
Canadian Championships	3rd J.	WD
J. = Junior level; WD = Withdrew
