= 2006–07 Grand Prix of Figure Skating Final =

Figure skating competition

2006–07 Grand Prix Final
- Type: Grand Prix
- Date: December 14 – 17, 2006
- Season: 2006–07
- Location: Saint Petersburg, Russia
- Venue: Ice Palace

Champions
- Men's singles: (France) Brian Joubert
- Ladies' singles: (South Korea) Yuna Kim
- Pairs: (China) Shen Xue / Zhao Hongbo
- Ice dance: (Bulgaria) Albena Denkova / Maxim Staviski
- Previous: 2005–06 Grand Prix Final
- Next: 2007–08 Grand Prix Final
- Previous GP: 2006 NHK Trophy

The 2006–07 Grand Prix of Figure Skating Final was an elite figure skating competition event held at the Ice Palace in Saint Petersburg, Russia from December 14 through December 17, 2006. Medals were awarded in men's singles, ladies' singles, pair skating, and ice dancing.

The Grand Prix Final was the culminating event of the ISU Grand Prix of Figure Skating series, which consisted of 2006 Skate America, 2006 Skate Canada International, 2006 Trophée Eric Bompard, 2006 Cup of China, 2006 Cup of Russia, and 2006 NHK Trophy competitions. The top six skaters from each discipline competed in the final.

== Format ==
The rules varied from the other Grand Prix events. The skaters performed the short program (or original dance, for ice dancers) in reverse order of their rankings, so the top scorer in the Grand Prix series skated last. The skating order for the long program (or free dance, for ice dancers) was the reverse order of their placement in the short program or original dance, unlike ordinary competitions where start orders are determined by a random draw. Ice dancers did not perform a compulsory dance.

The prize money for the 2006 Final was $25,000 for first place in all disciplines (pairs and dance teams split the money); $18,000 for second place; 12,000 for third place; $6,000 for fourth place; $4,000 for fifth place; and $3,000 for sixth place.

== Results ==
=== Men ===
Rank	Name	Nation	Total points	SP		FS	
1	Brian Joubert	France	233.46	1	80.75	1	152.71
2	Daisuke Takahashi	Japan	224.83	2	79.99	3	144.84
3	Nobunari Oda	Japan	216.86	4	69.15	2	147.71
4	Alban Préaubert	France	201.32	3	71.63	4	129.69
WD	Johnny Weir	United States		5	67.60		
WD	Evan Lysacek	United States					

=== Ladies ===
Rank	Name	Nation	Total points	SP		FS	
1	Yuna Kim	South Korea	184.20	3	65.06	1	119.14
2	Mao Asada	Japan	172.52	1	69.34	4	103.18
3	Sarah Meier	Switzerland	170.28	4	59.46	2	110.82
4	Fumie Suguri	Japan	158.78	5	55.14	3	103.64
5	Miki Ando	Japan	157.32	2	67.52	6	89.80
6	Júlia Sebestyén	Hungary	142.69	6	49.40	5	93.29

=== Pairs ===
Rank	Name	Nation	Total points	SP		FS	
1	Shen Xue / Zhao Hongbo	China	203.19	1	68.66	1	134.53
2	Aliona Savchenko / Robin Szolkowy	Germany	180.67	4	58.82	2	121.85
3	Zhang Dan / Zhang Hao	China	175.93	2	64.18	4	111.75
4	Rena Inoue / John Baldwin	United States	166.83	3	59.18	5	107.65
5	Valérie Marcoux / Craig Buntin	Canada	165.83	6	52.98	3	112.85
6	Maria Petrova / Alexei Tikhonov	Russia	154.59	5	56.52	6	98.07

=== Ice dancing ===
Rank	Name	Nation	Total points	OD		FD	
1	Albena Denkova / Maxim Staviski	Bulgaria	161.24	2	60.12	1	101.12
2	Marie-France Dubreuil / Patrice Lauzon	Canada	156.34	1	60.44	3	95.90
3	Oksana Domnina / Maxim Shabalin	Russia	156.14	3	59.97	2	96.17
4	Isabelle Delobel / Olivier Schoenfelder	France	149.00	4	57.28	4	91.72
5	Jana Khokhlova / Sergei Novitski	Russia	141.34	5	53.31	5	88.03
6	Melissa Gregory / Denis Petukhov	United States	135.94	6	52.84	6	83.10
