= Miki Ando =

Japanese figure skater (born 1987)

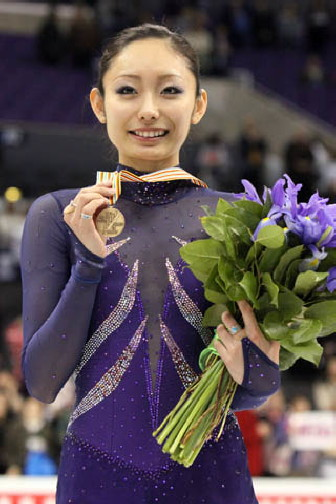
- Ando at the 2009 World Championships

Personal information
- Born: December 18, 1987 (age 38) Nagoya, Aichi Prefecture, Japan
- Height: 1.62 m (5 ft 4 in)

Figure skating career
- Country: Japan
- Discipline: Women's singles
- Began skating: 1995
- Retired: 2013
Event	Gold medal – first place	Silver medal – second place	Bronze medal – third place
World Championships	2	0	1
Four Continents Championships	1	0	1
Grand Prix Final	0	1	0
Japan Championships	3	2	2
World Team Trophy	0	0	1
World Junior Championships	1	1	1
Junior Grand Prix Final	2	0	1
Medal list
World Championships
Gold medal – first place	2007 Tokyo	Singles
Gold medal – first place	2011 Moscow	Singles
Bronze medal – third place	2009 Los Angeles	Singles
Four Continents Championships
Gold medal – first place	2011 Taipei	Singles
Bronze medal – third place	2008 Goyang	Singles
Grand Prix Final
Silver medal – second place	2009–10 Tokyo	Singles
Japan Championships
Gold medal – first place	2003–04 Nagano	Singles
Gold medal – first place	2004–05 Yokohama	Singles
Gold medal – first place	2010–11 Nagano	Singles
Silver medal – second place	2006–07 Nagoya	Singles
Silver medal – second place	2007–08 Osaka	Singles
Bronze medal – third place	2000–01 Nagano	Singles
Bronze medal – third place	2008–09 Nagano	Singles
World Team Trophy
Bronze medal – third place	2009 Tokyo	Team
World Junior Championships
Gold medal – first place	2004 The Hague	Singles
Silver medal – second place	2003 Ostrava	Singles
Bronze medal – third place	2002 Hamar	Singles
Junior Grand Prix Final
Gold medal – first place	2001–02 Bled	Singles
Gold medal – first place	2003–04 Malmö	Singles
Bronze medal – third place	2002–03 The Hague	Singles

Miki Ando

Japanese name
- Kanji: 安藤 美姫
- Kana: あんどう みき

Miki Ando (安藤 美姫, Andō Miki; born December 18, 1987) is a retired Japanese figure skater. She is the 2007 and 2011 World champion, 2011 Four Continents champion, 2004 World Junior champion, and a three-time (2003, 2004 & 2010) Japanese national champion.

Ando is the first female skater to complete a quadruple jump successfully in competition. She accomplished this at the 2002–03 Junior Grand Prix Final in The Hague, Netherlands.

== Personal life ==
Ando was born on December 18, 1987, in Nagoya, Aichi Prefecture. Her father died in a traffic accident when she was eight years old. In 2006, Ando joined Toyota and also entered Chukyo University as an adult learner, from which she graduated in March 2011. She learned English during her time training in the U.S. In January 2013, she left Toyota Motor.

Ando gave birth to a daughter, Himawari ("sunflower" in Japanese), in April 2013.

== Career ==
=== Early career ===
Ando began skating in 1996 at the age of eight. Her first coach was Rina Horie. Yuko Monna, whose students at that time included Mao Asada and Mai Asada, soon began teaching Ando. Beginning in the 2000–01 season, she was coached by Nobuo Satō, and her program already featured a 3Lz-3Lo.

Making her junior international debut, Ando won both of her 2001–02 ISU Junior Grand Prix (JGP) assignments and qualified for the JGP Final, where she also won gold. Nationally, she became the Japanese junior champion and senior bronze medalist. She concluded her season with bronze at the 2002 World Junior Championships.

Ando won both of her 2002–03 JGP assignments. At the JGP Final, she became the first female skater to land a quad jump of any kind in a competition, performing a quadruple Salchow jump on her way to the bronze medal. She remained the only woman ever to perform this feat until January 2018, when junior skater Alexandra Trusova ratified the same jump in competition. That season she defended her national Junior crown and took silver at the World Junior Championships.

Ando was prominent in 2003–04, winning all her junior competitions including the Junior Grand Prix Final, her third consecutive national junior title, and the Junior Worlds. She also won the Japan Championships (senior) and placed 4th at her first senior World Championships.

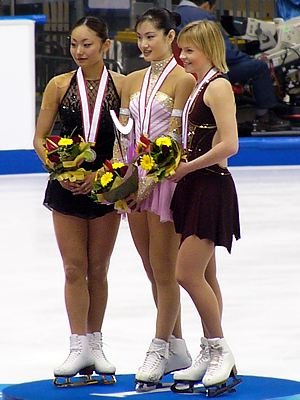
Ando (far left) at the 2004 NHK Trophy ceremony

=== 2004–05 season ===
The 2004–05 season was her first full season as a senior skater. She won two medals in the ISU Grand Prix of Figure Skating series and qualified for the Grand Prix Final, where she placed fourth. She won her second national senior title and placed sixth at 2005 Worlds.

=== 2005–06 season ===
Ando relocated to the United States to train with Carol Heiss Jenkins in preparation for the 2005–06 season which included the 2006 Winter Olympics in Torino. The season began well, when she won the silver medal at the 2005 Cup of Russia, but she finished 4th at the 2005 NHK Trophy and narrowly qualified for the Grand Prix Final, where she placed 4th. At Japanese Nationals, she placed 6th.

Ando was named to the Japanese Olympic team in accordance with the criteria that were to include two seasons into consideration. At the Olympics, she placed 15th, after falling three times in her free skate, once on her quad attempt. She was not placed on the team to the World Championships the following month.

=== 2006–07 season ===
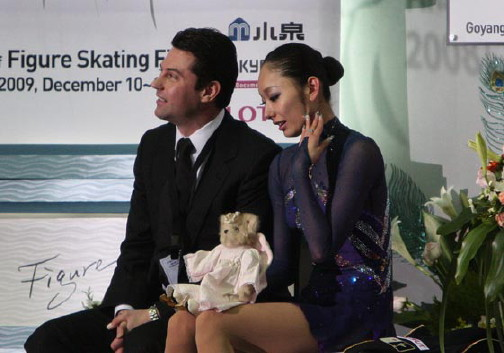
Ando with former coach Nikolai Morozov

Ando changed coaches again for the 2006–07 season. Training with her new coach, Nikolai Morozov, Ando won gold at the 2006 Skate America and silver at the 2006 Trophée Eric Bompard. She qualified for the Grand Prix Final, where she placed 5th. It was later revealed that Ando, along with the rest of the Japanese team, competed in Saint Petersburg while suffering stomach flu.

At the Japanese Nationals, Ando dislocated her shoulder while performing a spin in her free skate but skated on to place second overall behind Mao Asada.

At the 2007 Worlds, Ando placed second in both the short program and the free skate, and scored a total of 195.09 points to win the World Championship by less than one point over Asada. Ando set new personal bests in both the short program and the free skate, and a new personal best total score. She was named one of Vogue Japan's "Women of the Year for 2007" and received six other awards including the "most valuable mention" from the Japanese Olympic Committee.

=== 2007–08 season ===
Ando's 2007–08 season began with a silver medal at the 2007 Skate America but placed fourth at the 2007 NHK Trophy, where she fell three times in her free skate. She did not qualify for the Grand Prix Final. At the Japan Championships, she won the free skate to place second overall, again behind Asada.

In the following February, Ando competed for the first time at Four Continents, where she attempted a 4S but popped it to a double. She won the bronze medal. At Worlds, Ando was 8th after the short program and was forced to withdraw during her free skate due to a leg muscle strain she had been suffering since that morning.

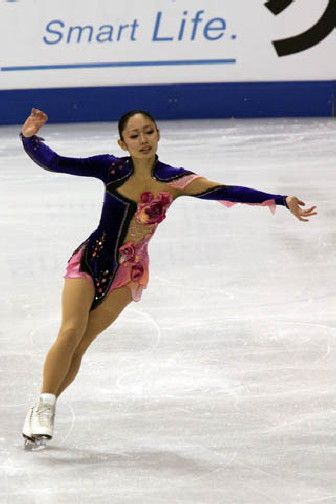
Ando at the 2009 World Championships

=== 2008–09 season ===
In the 2008–09 Grand Prix season, Ando placed third after Yuna Kim and Yukari Nakano at Skate America and placed second, behind Kim, again, at the Cup of China. At the Grand Prix Final, Ando stayed on her foot after an attempted 4S in her free skate program, the first time in competition since 2004, though the rotations were not considered enough and the jump was downgraded. Despite her last place finish, Ando stated that she was very happy with her performance, and that she would continue to work on her 4S.

At the Japan Championships, she was in 3rd place after the short program. During the free skate warm-up, she collided with Fumie Suguri, and injured her knee. She placed third and earned one of Japan's three spots at the 2009 World Championships. Before the event, the Japanese skating federation wanted her to leave Morozov. There, she won the bronze medal with a total of 190.38 after placing fourth in the short program and second in the free program.

Ando represented Japan in a team competition, 2009 ISU World Team Trophy, in Tokyo, Japan, where she placed 3rd at the short program, 6th at the free skate and 5th overall. Team Japan was placed 3rd, winning the bronze medal.

=== 2009–10 season ===
The Japan Skating Federation set, as one of its criteria for choosing the skaters to send to the 2010 Winter Olympics, the highest Japanese medal finisher at the Grand Prix Final. With this in mind, Ando competed at Rostelecom Cup; she placed third in the short program and won the free skate to win the competition overall. At the NHK Trophy, she placed second in both segments and first overall. The two wins qualified Ando for the Grand Prix Final.

At this GP Final in Tokyo, Ando placed first in the short program, 0.56 points ahead of second-place finisher Yuna Kim, and second in the free skate. She was awarded the silver medal behind Kim but ahead of the bronze medalist Akiko Suzuki. With this result, she earned a spot in Japan's Olympic team despite placing fourth at the Japanese Championships.

In February 2010, Ando competed at the 2010 Winter Olympics in Vancouver, British Columbia, Canada. In the short program, she executed a 3Lz-3L combination but the 3L was downgraded. She earned levels 3 and 4 on spins. Ranked fourth in the short program and sixth in the free skate, she finished fifth overall. Although she originally intended to miss the 2010–11 season, she changed her mind following the Olympics.

At the 2010 World Championships, she finished fourth overall after placing eleventh in the short – having fallen on her opening 3Lz – and third in the free.

=== 2010–11 season ===
Ando was assigned to Cup of China and the Rostelecom Cup for the 2010–11 Grand Prix season. In August, shortly before the beginning of the season, she changed her training base while abroad from Hackensack, New Jersey, USA, to Daugavpils, Latvia. She was originally said to have intended to move to Russia, but this plan had to be changed due to the smog and heat wave in Moscow.

At Cup of China, Ando attempted a 3Lz-3Lo combination in the short program, but the loop was deemed underrotated by the technical panel, and she placed third in this segment. She won the free skate segment with a clean performance and won the event overall, ahead of silver medalist Akiko Suzuki and bronze medalist Alena Leonova.

Ando competed with a back injury at Rostelecom Cup after a collision with Abzal Rakimgaliev, from Kazakhstan, earlier in the week in practice. An underrotated 3F in the short program left her in 5th place after the short program but she placed first in the long program, winning the gold medal ahead of silver medalist Suzuki and bronze medalist Ashley Wagner.

With two gold medals in the Grand Prix circuit, Ando qualified for the Grand Prix Final in Beijing, where she performed her renewed short program that was completed only a week prior. Mistakes on two jumps left her in 5th place following the short program. She ranked first in the free skate but it was not enough to make up the gap from the short program, and she stayed 5th overall.

On December 26, Ando won her third Japanese National title over silver medalist Mao Asada and bronze medalist Kanako Murakami, and these three were nominated into the Japanese team for the World Championships, which at the time were scheduled to be held in Tokyo in March 2011. At the Four Continents Championships in February, Ando placed first in both the short program and free skating segments to win the competition overall. Her total score of 201.34 was a season's and personal best.

Ando won the gold medal at the World Championships in Moscow, Russia, beating silver medalist Yuna Kim by 1.29 points and bronze medalist Carolina Kostner by 11.11 points.

=== 2011–12 season ===
In June, it was reported that Ando would sit out the 2011–12 Grand Prix series. She later decided not to compete all season, and in ISU events she appeared only once as an invited skater in the exhibition of the World Team Trophy. Instead, Ando participated in numerous shows worldwide, and among them, a benefit event for the victims of the earthquake and tsunami of March 11, 2011, called "Reborn Garden", was planned, co-choreographed and co-produced by Ando herself. The characteristic choreography by Ando and Tsurutani is to a non-stop sequence of various music assembled into one story scene, similar to a ballet program.

=== 2012–13 season ===
Ando was assigned to the 2012 Cup of China and 2012 Trophee Eric Bompard. In May, Ando said she was uncertain if she was ready to return to competition but she had to sign a commitment. In October, she withdrew from both events because she was unable to find a permanent coach. At the end of the same month, Ando learned she was pregnant. She gave birth in April 2013 to a baby girl and resumed training a month later.

=== 2013–14 season ===
After two years away from competition and five months after giving birth, Ando appeared at the 2013 Nebelhorn Trophy and won the silver medal behind Russian senior debutant Elena Radionova. Following her seventh-place finish at the 2014 Nationals, Ando announced her retirement from competitive skating and said that she intended to pursue a coaching career.

=== Post-competitive ===
Ando has worked for Japanese television and begun coaching. She was also a main cast member at the annual touring ice show Fantasy on Ice, having participated in all editions from 2010 to 2019. In 2013, she performed in a live music collaboration with singer Ai to the song "To mama", after giving birth to her daughter Himawari.

== Away from figure skating ==
She joined SASUKE 39 at 28 December 2021. She failed Stage 1 at Dragon Glider.

== Programs ==
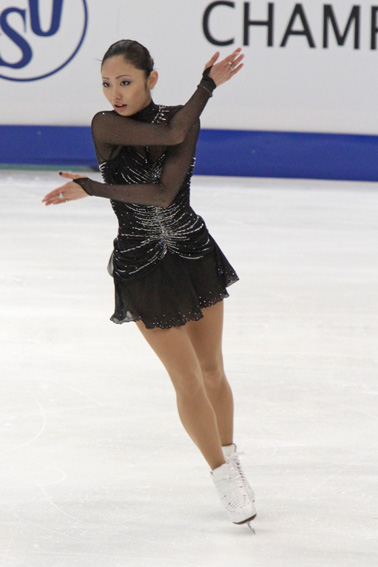
Ando at the 2011 Four Continents

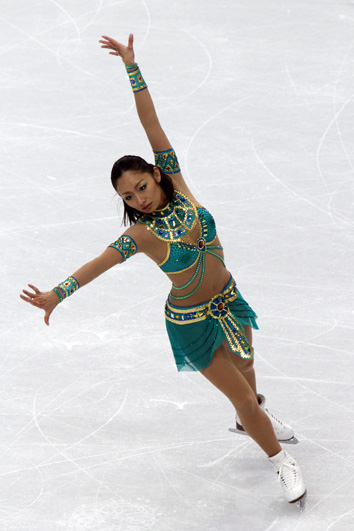
Ando at the 2010 Winter Olympics

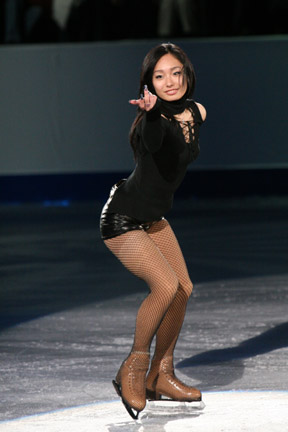
Ando performing her exhibition Handcuffs at the 2008 Four Continents

=== Post–2014 ===
Season	Free skating Pro-am events	Exhibition
2014–16	Ballade No. 4 in F minor, Op. 52 by Frédéric Chopin	

=== Pre–2014 ===
Season	Short program	Free skating	Exhibition
2013–14	My Way by Frank Sinatra	The Firebird by Igor Stravinsky	Amazing Grace; Boléro by Maurice Ravel
2012–13	Did not compete this season		
2011–12	Did not compete this season		I am a Thousand Winds by Hayley Westenra choreo. by Nikolai Morozov; Black Swan by Clint Mansell choreo. by Nikolai Morozov; You Must Love Me (from Evita) choreo. by Kenji Miyamoto; I (Who Have Nothing) by Gladys Knight choreo. by Kenji Miyamoto; Foolin' by Dionne Bromfield choreo. by Kenji Miyamoto; Fragile by Sting choreo. by Miho Tsurutani, Miki Ando; Over the Rainbow (from The Wizard of Oz) choreo. by Miho Tsurutani, Miki Ando; O mio babbino caro by Giacomo Puccini choreo. by Stéphane Lambiel; Méditation (Thaïs) by Jules Massenet choreo. by Noriko Sato
2010–11	Gabriel's Oboe; The Falls (from The Mission) by Ennio Morricone performed by Yo-Yo Ma; Broken Sorrow; Egyptian in the Night by Nuttin' But Stringz	Piano Concerto in A minor, Op. 16 by Edvard Grieg	Comin' Home Baby by Michael Bublé; Why do People fall in Love by Linda Eder; Concierto de Aranjuez by Joaquín Rodrigo performed by Operatica, featuring Inva Mula; Requiem by Wolfgang Amadeus Mozart
2009–10	Requiem by Wolfgang Amadeus Mozart	Cleopatra; Marco Polo by Loreena McKennitt; Marco Polo by Ennio Morricone; Rome by Jeff Beal; Asterix & Obelix: Mission Cleopatra by Philippe Chany	Bring in 'da Noise, Bring in 'da Funk; Requiem by Wolfgang Amadeus Mozart; Queen of the Night (from The Draughtsman's Contract); Ac-Cent-Tchu-Ate the Positive by Aretha Franklin
2008–09	Chairman's Waltz (from Memoirs of a Geisha) by John Williams	Symphony No. 3 in C minor, Op. 78 by Camille Saint-Saëns; Giselle by Adolphe Adam	Boléro by Maurice Ravel; I Believe by Ayaka
2007–08	Scheherazade by Nikolai Rimsky-Korsakov; Samson et Delilah by Camille Saint-Saëns	Carmen by Georges Bizet	La bohème by Giacomo Puccini; Hurt by Christina Aguilera; Handcuffs by Claudette Ortiz
2006–07	Scheherazade by Nikolai Rimsky-Korsakov	Violin Concerto by Felix Mendelssohn	I Believe by Ayaka; Mikazuki by Ayaka
2005–06	Merry Christmas, Mr. Lawrence by Ryuichi Sakamoto	Madama Butterfly by Giacomo Puccini; My Funny Valentine by Richard Rodgers	Ac-Cent-Tchu-Ate the Positive by Aretha Franklin
2004–05	Gypsy Soul by Strunz & Farah	The Firebird by Igor Stravinsky; Guitar Concerto – For Two Christophers by Elmer Bernstein	Mickey (from Bring It On) by B*Witched
2003–04	Grande Polonaise Brillante by Frédéric Chopin	The Firebird by Igor Stravinsky	Beat Out Dat Rhythm on a Drum (from Carmen Jones) by Georges Bizet, Oscar Hammerstein II
2002–03	Asturias by Isaac Albéniz	La Bayadère by Ludwig Minkus	Claire de Lune by Claude Debussy
2001–02	Csárdás by Vittorio Monti	Swan Lake by Pyotr Ilyich Tchaikovsky	
2000–01	España cañí by Pascual Marquina Narro	Riverdance by Bill Whelan	

== Competitive highlights ==
GP: Grand Prix; JGP: Junior Grand Prix

International
Event	99–00	00–01	01–02	02–03	03–04	04–05	05–06	06–07	07–08	08–09	09–10	10–11	11–12	13–14
Olympics							15th				5th			
Worlds					4th	6th		1st	WD	3rd	4th	1st		
Four Continents									3rd			1st		
GP Final						4th	4th	5th		6th	2nd	5th		
GP Bompard								2nd						
GP Cup of China						4th				2nd		1st		
GP Cup of Russia							2nd				1st	1st		
GP NHK Trophy						2nd	4th		4th		1st			
GP Skate America						3rd		1st	2nd	3rd				
Golden Spin														2nd
Ice Challenge														2nd
Nebelhorn Trophy														2nd
International: Junior
Junior Worlds			3rd	2nd	1st									
JGP Final			1st	3rd	1st									
JGP Canada				1st										
JGP China				1st										
JGP Czech Rep.			1st											
JGP Japan					1st									
JGP Mexico					1st									
JGP Sweden			1st											
National
Japan Champ.			3rd	5th	1st	1st	6th	2nd	2nd	3rd	4th	1st		7th
Japan Junior	7th	3rd	1st	1st	1st									
Team events
World Team; Trophy										3rd T 5th P				
Japan Open							1st T 4th P	1st T 1st P				1st T 2nd P	3rd T 6th P	
WD: Withdrew; T: Team result; P: Personal result. Medals awarded for team result only.

Pro-am events
Event	2014–15	2015–16
Medal Winners Open	3rd	3rd

== Detailed results ==
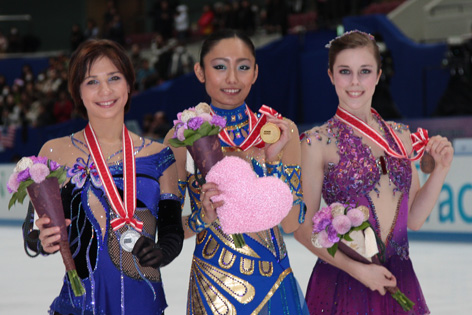
Ando at the 2009 NHK Trophy

Small medals for short program and free skating awarded only at ISU Championships.

2013–14 season
Date	Event	SP	FS	Total
December 20–23, 2013	2013–14 Japan Championships	5; 64.87	9; 106.25	7; 171.12
December 5–8, 2013	2013 Golden Spin of Zagreb	2; 62.81	2; 114.01	2; 176.82
November 19–24, 2013	2013 Ice Challenge	1; 56.78	2; 94.12	2; 150.90
September 26–28, 2013	2013 Nebelhorn Trophy	2; 59.79	4; 103.07	2; 162.86
2011–12 season
Date	Event	SP	FS	Total
October 1, 2011	2011 Japan Open	–	6; 88.11	3T
2010–11 season
Date	Event	SP	FS	Total
April 25 – May 1, 2011	2011 World Championships	2; 65.58	1; 130.21	1; 195.79
February 15–20, 2011	2011 Four Continents Championships	1; 66.58	1; 134.76	1; 201.34
December 24–26, 2010	2010–11 Japan Championships	2; 64.76	1; 137.58	1; 202.34
December 8–12, 2010	2010–11 Grand Prix Final	5; 50.45	1; 122.70	5; 173.15
November 19–21, 2010	2010 Rostelecom Cup	5; 54.00	1; 120.47	1; 174.47
November 5–7, 2010	2010 Cup of China	3; 56.11	1; 116.10	1; 172.21
October 2, 2010	2010 Japan Open	–	2; 115.02	1T
2009–10 season
Date	Event	SP	FS	Total
March 22–28, 2010	2010 World Championships	11; 55.78	3; 122.04	4; 177.82
February 14–27, 2010	2010 Winter Olympic Games	4; 64.76	6; 124.10	5; 188.86
December 25–27, 2009	2009–10 Japan Championships	3; 68.68	4; 116.76	4; 185.44
December 2–6, 2009	2009–10 Grand Prix Final	1; 66.20	2; 119.74	2; 185.94
November 2–5, 2009	2009 NHK Trophy	2; 56.22	2; 106.33	1; 162.55
October 22–25, 2009	2009 Rostelecom Cup	3; 57.18	1; 114.75	1; 171.93
2008–09 season
Date	Event	SP	FS	Total
April 15–19, 2009	2009 ISU World Team Trophy	3; 62.08	6; 105.44	3T/5P; 167.52
March 23–29, 2009	2009 World Championships	4; 64.12	2; 126.26	3; 190.38
December 25–27, 2008	2008–09 Japan Championships	3; 65.02	4; 109.07	3; 174.09
December 10–14, 2008	2008–09 Grand Prix Final	5; 55.44	5; 102.81	6; 158.25
November 5–9, 2008	2008 Cup of China	2; 59.30	2; 111.58	2; 170.88
October 23–26, 2008	2008 Skate America	2; 57.80	3; 110.62	3; 168.42
2007–08 season
Date	Event	SP	FS	Total
March 17–23, 2008	2008 World Championships	8; 59.21	WD	–
February 11–17, 2008	2008 Four Continents Championships	2; 60.07	3; 117.59	3; 177.66
December 26–28, 2007	2007–08 Japan Championships	2; 68.68	1; 135.50	2; 204.18
November 29 – December 2, 2007	2007 NHK Trophy	2; 60.52	7; 85.29	4; 145.81
October 25–28, 2007	2007 Skate America	2; 56.58	1; 105.31	2; 161.89
2006–07 season
Date	Event	SP	FS	Total
April 29, 2007	2007 Japan Open	–	1; 112.65	1T
March 19–25, 2007	2007 World Championships	2; 67.98	2; 127.11	1; 195.09
December 27–29, 2006	2006–07 Japan Championships	2; 69.50	3; 116.15	2; 185.65
December 14–17, 2006	2006–07 Grand Prix Final	2; 67.52	6; 89.80	5; 157.32
November 17–19, 2006	2006 Trophée Eric Bompard	2; 65.02	2; 109.42	2; 174.44
October 26–29, 2006	2006 Skate America	2; 66.74	1; 125.85	1; 192.59
2005–06 season
Date	Event	SP	FS	Total
March 14, 2006	2006 Japan Open	–	4; 104.56	1T
February 10–26, 2006	2006 Winter Olympics	8; 56.00	16; 84.20	15; 140.20
December 23–25, 2005	2005–06 Japan Championships	6; 60.24	6; 113.12	6; 173.36
December 16–18, 2005	2005–06 Grand Prix Final	3; 56.70	4; 100.60	4; 157.30
December 1–3, 2005	2005 NHK Trophy	4; 54.56	4; 99.78	4; 154.34
November 24–27, 2005	2005 Cup of Russia	2; 60.76	2; 111.54	2; 172.30

2004–05 season
Date	Event	QR	SP	FS	Total
March 14–20, 2005	2005 World Championships	2; 27.66	7; 59.30	7; 106.18	6; 193.14
December 24–26, 2004	2004–05 Japan Championships	–	3; 63.23	1; 109.24	1; 172.47
December 16–19, 2004	2004–05 Grand Prix Final	–	5; 51.06	3; 100.04	4; 151.10
November 11–14, 2004	2004 Cup of China	–	4; 49.76	4; 100.56	4; 150.32
November 4–7, 2004	2004 NHK Trophy	–	3; 50.90	1; 119.46	2; 170.36
October 21–24, 2004	2004 Skate America	–	1; 53.64	6; 89.00	3; 142.64

2003–04 season
Date	Event	Level	QR	SP	FS	Total
March 22–28, 2004	2004 World Championships	Senior	2	3	4	4
March 1–6, 2004	2004 World Junior Championships	Junior	1	1	1	1
December 25–26, 2003	2003–04 Japan Championships	Senior	–	2	1	1
December 12–14, 2003	2003–04 JGP Final	Junior	–	2	1	1
November 22–23, 2003	2003–04 Japan Junior Championships	Junior	–	1	1	1
October 16–19, 2003	2003 JGP Mexico	Junior	–	1	1	1
September 25–26, 2003	2003 JGP Japan	Junior	–	1	1	1
2002–03 season
Date	Event	Level	QR	SP	FS	Total
Feb. 24 – March 2, 2003	2003 World Junior Championships	Junior	3	3	2	2
December 20–22, 2002	2002–03 Japan Championships	Senior	–	2	6	5
December 12–15, 2002	2002–03 JGP Final	Junior	–	5	2	3
November 23–24, 2002	2002–03 Japan Junior Championships	Junior	–	1	1	1
October 17–20, 2002	2002 JGP China	Junior	–	2	1	1
September 26–29, 2002	2002 JGP Canada	Junior	–	3	1	1
2001–02 season
Date	Event	Level	QR	SP	FS	Total
March 4–10, 2002	2002 World Junior Championships	Junior	1	4	3	3
December 21–23, 2001	2001–02 Japan Championships	Senior	–	3	3	3
December 13–16, 2001	2001–02 JGP Final	Junior	–	2	1	1
November 23–24, 2001	2001–02 Japan Junior Championships	Junior	–	1	1	1
November 1–4, 2001	2001 JGP Sweden	Junior	–	1	1	1
September 27–30, 2001	2001 JGP Czech Republic	Junior	–	3	1	1

- QR: Qualification round
