= Valérie Marcoux =

Canadian pair skater

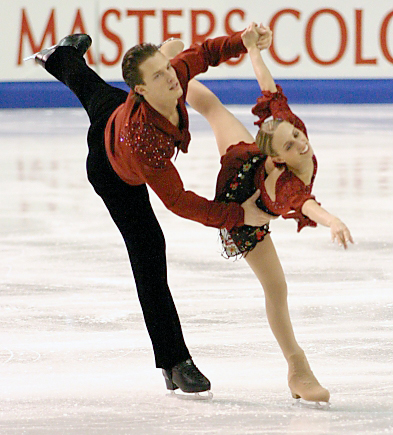
- Valerie Marcoux competes with partner Craig Buntin at the 2004 Four Continents Championships.

Personal information
- Born: April 1, 1980 (age 46) Ottawa, Ontario, Canada
- Height: 1.54 m (5 ft 1/2 in)

Figure skating career
- Country: Canada
- Skating club: CPA Gatineau
- Retired: April 24, 2007
Medal record
Representing Canada
Pairs' Figure skating
Four Continents Championships
Bronze medal – third place	2004 Hamilton	Pairs

Valérie Marcoux (born April 1, 1980 in Ottawa, Ontario) is a Canadian former pair skater. With partner Craig Buntin, she is a three-time Canadian national champion. Prior to teaming up with Buntin in 2002, she skated with Bruno Marcotte. Marcoux announced her retirement from competitive figure skating on April 24, 2007.

== Programs ==
=== With Buntin ===
Season	Short program	Free skating	Exhibition
2006–2007	Cherry Pink and Apple Blossom White	L'Amour by Osvaldo Montes	
2005–2006	Big Spender (from Sweet Charity)	Our Song by Paul Kunigis	
2004–2005	Fever; Jump, Jive and Wail	Moscow Nights; Meadowlands; Korobushka by Bond	All Shook Up sung by Billy Joel
2003–2004	Caravan by Juan Tizol, Duke Ellington	Rockin' Gypsies by Willie & Lobo; Cancion Triste by Jesse Cook	

=== With Marcotte ===
Season	Short program	Free skating
2001–2002	Sweet Dreams: The Anthology by Roy Buchanan	Beyond the Forest by Max Steiner performed by National Philharmonic Orchestra

== Results ==
GP: Grand Prix

=== With Buntin ===
International
Event	02–03	03–04	04–05	05–06	06–07
Winter Olympics				11th	
World Champ.		9th	9th	5th	6th
Four Continents Champ.		3rd			4th
GP Final					5th
GP Cup of China			3rd		4th
GP Cup of Russia	7th	4th			
GP NHK Trophy					3rd
GP Skate Canada	6th	7th	5th	3rd	3rd
GP Trophée Bompard				3rd	
Bofrost Cup on Ice		1st	2nd		
Nebelhorn Trophy	1st				
National
Canadian Champ.	4th	1st	1st	1st	2nd

=== With Marcotte ===
International
Event	2000–01	2001–02
World Championships		12th
Four Continents Champ.		4th
GP Cup of Russia		7th
GP Trophée Lalique	7th	
GP Sparkassen Cup on Ice	6th	5th
Nebelhorn Trophy	1st	
National
Canadian Champ.	4th	4th
