= Brent Bommentre =

American ice dancer (born 1984)

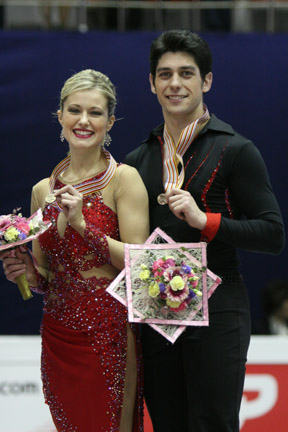
- Navarro and Bommentre in 2008.

Personal information
- Born: May 10, 1984 (age 42) Chestnut Hill, Pennsylvania, U.S.
- Height: 5 ft 9 in (1.76 m)

Figure skating career
- Country: United States
- Partner: Kimberly Navarro; Former: Kendra Goodwin; Kirsten Frisch; Allison Sietech
- Coach: Robbie Kaine; Cheryl Demkowski-Snyder; Renee Roca; Jeannine Osayande; Natalia Linichuk
- Skating club: Philadelphia Skating Club
- Began skating: 1990
- Retired: May 11, 2010
Medal record
Figure skating: Ice dancing
Representing the United States
Four Continents Championships
Bronze medal – third place	2008 Goyang	Ice dancing

Brent Bommentre (born May 10, 1984) is an American former competitive ice dancer. With partner Kimberly Navarro, he is the 2008 Four Continents bronze medalist and a two-time (2008 & 2009) U.S. national bronze medalist.

== Personal life ==
Bommentre was born May 10, 1984, in Chestnut Hill, Philadelphia. He attended Drexel University. He graduated from UC Berkeley's Haas School of Business with a degree in Business Administration and a minor in Global Development in 2019. He has two younger sisters, Ashley and Brianne. He married Karen Casperson on July 4, 2020, and they reside in Hailey, Idaho.

== Career ==
Bommentre was the manager of Black Tie Ski Rentals of Sun Valley from December 2019- April 2020 in Ketchum, Idaho. The company provides premier ski rentals and delivery services to the Sun Valley area.

== Skating career ==
Early in his career, Bommentre competed with Allison Seitchik and Kirsten Frisch. He teamed up with Kendra Goodwin in the spring of 2003. They won the pewter medal at the 2004 U.S. Championships and competed at the 2004 Skate America and the 2004 Cup of Russia. Goodwin and Bommentre announced the end of their partnership in March 2005.

Bommentre teamed up with Kimberly Navarro after a tryout in April 2005. They won the bronze medal at the 2008 U.S. Championships, and were chosen to represent the United States at the 2008 Four Continents, where they finished in 3rd, and the 2008 World Championships in Gothenburg, Sweden, where they were 12th. At the 2009 Nationals, Navarro/Bommentre again finished 3rd, but were left off the Worlds team in favor of Tanith Belbin / Benjamin Agosto, who had missed U.S. Nationals due to injury. They did compete at the 2009 Four Continents, where they finished in sixth place.

In the Olympic season, Navarro/Bommentre finished 4th at U.S. Nationals, and were not named to the Olympic team. When Belbin/Agosto ended their competitive career following the Olympics, they were selected to compete at the 2010 World Championships. They were 14th in their second Worlds appearance. Navarro/Bommentre announced their retirement from competition on May 11, 2010. They perform with the Ice Theatre of New York and, in November 2012, they taped an appearance in an episode of Glee. In Bommentre's professional skating career he has performed with Holiday On Ice, Broadway on Ice, Sun Valley On Ice, the 2014 Olympic Tour of Stars On Ice, and Nancy Kerrigan's "Halloween On Ice." He has also performed in the Disson television skating specials "Shall We Dance On Ice" and "Colgate Skating and Gymnastics." Bommentre also competed as part of the act "Aerial Ice" on the quarter-finals of NBC's America's Got Talent.

He has been a principal performer and figure skating instructor since age 15 and loves coaching kids and adults. He has instructed students ranging from 4 to 75 years old with over 4,000 cumulative hours of instruction. Bommentre has helped students through over 500 dance tests, resulting in 12 Gold Medals and three placements on internationally ranked collegiate synchronized skating teams. He frequently comes to Minnesota to help skaters and coach. He has performed as a principal soloist for over 1.5 million resort guests across ten years and 100 shows.

== Programs ==
=== With Navarro ===
Season	Original dance	Free dance
2009–10	Quero Voltar Pra Angola by Alex Shaw	One by Mary J. Blige featuring U2
2008–09	Hey Pachuco! by Royal Crown Review; Why Don't You Do Right? by Sinéad O'Connor	Weapon of Choice; The Rockafeller Skank; Soul Surfing by Fatboy Slim
2007–08	Ijuba 2: First Movement; Ijuba 2: Second Movement; Ijuba by Soweto Percussion Ensemble	Since I've Been Loving You by Corinne Bailey Rae
2006–07	Assassin's Tango (from Mr. & Mrs. Smith) by John Powell; Little Drop of Poison by Tom Waits; Assassin's Tango	The Beatles medley: Golden Slumbers; Carry that Weight; The End
2005–06	Dance With Me by Debelah Morgan; Represent, Cuba (from "Havana Nights" soundtrack) by Heather Hedley	How Sweet It Is; Feelin' Good by Michael Bublé

=== With Goodwin ===
Season	Original dance	Free dance
2004–05	One Bad Habit by Frank Wildhorn, Jack Murphy; Call Me Irresponsible by S. Cahn, J. van Hensen; One Bad Habit by Frank Wildhorn, Jack Murphy	Evita by Andrew Lloyd Webber

=== With Frisch ===
Season	Original dance	Free dance
2002–03	Radetzky March; Blue Danube; Radetzky March by Johann Strauss	Sous le Soleil by The Major Boys; Epoca by Gotan Project; Club le Narcisse by M. McLaren

== Results ==
GP: Grand Prix; JGP: Junior Grand Prix

=== With Navarro ===
International
Event	05–06	06–07	07–08	08–09	09–10
World Champ.			12th		14th
Four Continents Champ.		5th	3rd	6th	
GP Bompard					6th
GP NHK Trophy			6th	6th	
GP Skate America		6th	6th		5th
GP Skate Canada		6th		5th	
Schäfer Memorial	5th	3rd			
National
U.S. Championships	5th	4th	3rd	3rd	4th

=== With Goodwin ===
International
Event	2003–04	2004–05
GP Cup of Russia		11th
GP Skate America		8th
Golden Spin of Zagreb	4th	
National
U.S. Championships	4th	6th

=== With Frisch ===
International
Event	00–01	01–02	02–03
World Junior Champ.			12th
JGP China	5th		5th
JGP France	8th		
JGP United States			6th
National
U.S. Championships	6th J.	4th J.	2nd J.
J. = Junior
