= Sean Wirtz =

Canadian figure skater

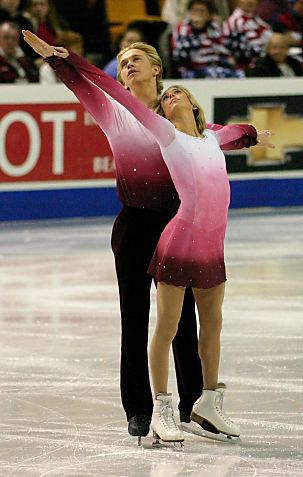
- Putnam / Wirtz in 2004.

Personal information
- Full name: Sean Wirtz
- Other names: Sean Kelly-Wirtz; Sean Kelly
- Born: October 31, 1979 (age 46) Marathon, Ontario
- Height: 1.75 m (5 ft 9 in)

Figure skating career
- Country: Canada
- Skating club: Kerrisdale FSC
- Began skating: 1992
- Retired: August 28, 2007

Sean Wirtz (also Sean Kelly and Sean Kelly-Wirtz; born October 31, 1979, in Marathon, Ontario) is a Canadian figure skater who competed in pair skating and single skating. He teamed up with Elizabeth Putnam in the summer of 2002. They are the 2006 Four Continents bronze medalists and two-time (2003, 2004) Canadian national bronze medalists. Wirtz announced his retirement from competitive skating on August 28, 2007.

Wirtz is the nephew of coach Paul Wirtz and former Olympic pair skater Kris Wirtz.

== Programs ==
(with Putnam)

Season	Short program	Free skating	Exhibition
2006–2007	Sing, Sing, Sing	Piano Concerto No. 1 by Pyotr Tchaikovsky	
2005–2006	Incantation (from Quidam) by Cirque du Soleil	Piano Concerto No. 1 by Pyotr Tchaikovsky	
2004–2005	My Sweet and Tender Beast by Eugen Doga	Moonlight Sonata by Ludwig van Beethoven	
2003–2004	Ave Maria by Johann Sebastian Bach	Variations on a Theme of Paganini by Sergei Rachmaninoff	To Where You Are by Josh Groban
2002–2003	Meditation from Thais by Jules Massenet London Symphonic Orchestra	Violin Fantasie on Puccini's Turandot performed by Vanessa-Mae and the Royal Philharmonic Orchestra; Nessun Dorma (from Turandot) by Giacomo Puccini performed by the BBC Concert Orchestra	To Where You Are by Josh Groban

== Results ==
=== Pairs skating with Putnam ===
International
Event	2002–03	2003–04	2004–05	2005–06	2006–07
Four Continents	9th	9th	4th	3rd	
GP Bompard					4th
GP Cup of Russia				5th	
GP Skate America		6th	5th	4th	
GP Skate Canada		5th			4th
Bofrost Cup		3rd			
National
Canadians	3rd	3rd	4th	5th	6th
GP = Grand Prix

=== Pair skating with Dubois ===
Event	1998–1999	1999–2000
Canadian Championships	1st N.	2nd J.
Levels: N. = Novice; J. = Junior

=== Singles career ===
International
Event	1996–97	1997–98	1998–99	1999–00	2000–01	2001–02
Golden Spin of Zagreb						8th
Nebelhorn Trophy						12th
JS Bulgaria		12th				
National
Canadians	5th J.			3rd J.	4th	
JS = Junior Series; J. = Junior level
