= 2004–05 ISU World Standings =

Merit-based ice skating ranking

Season-end No. 1 skaters
- Men's singles: (Russia) Evgeni Plushenko
- Ladies' singles: (Japan) Shizuka Arakawa
- Pairs: (Russia) Maria Petrova / Alexei Tikhonov
- Ice dance: (Russia) Tatiana Navka / Roman Kostomarov

Navigation

The 2004–05 ISU World Standings, are the World Standings published by the International Skating Union (ISU) during the 2004–05 season.

The 2004–05 ISU World Standings for single & pair skating and ice dance, are taking into account results of the 2002–03, 2003–04 and 2004–05 seasons.

== World Standings for single & pair skating and ice dance ==
=== Season-end standings ===
The remainder of this section is a list, by discipline, published by the ISU.

==== Men's singles (30 skaters) ====
As of March 17, 2005

Rank	Nation	Skater	Points	Season	ISU Championships or Olympics	(Junior) Grand Prix and Final		Selected International Competition	
Rank	Nation	Skater	Points	Season	Best	Best	2nd Best	Best	2nd Best
1	RUS	Evgeni Plushenko	4550	2004/2005 season (100%)	840	800	400	0	0
1	RUS	Evgeni Plushenko	4550	2003/2004 season (100%)	1200	750	400	0	0
1	RUS	Evgeni Plushenko	4550	2002/2003 season (70%)	840	560	280	0	0
2	FRA	Brian Joubert	3965	2004/2005 season (100%)	950	600	400	0	0
2	FRA	Brian Joubert	3965	2003/2004 season (100%)	1150	375	325	0	0
2	FRA	Brian Joubert	3965	2002/2003 season (70%)	665	490	280	0	0
3	CAN	Emanuel Sandhu	3925	2004/2005 season (100%)	900	650	400	0	0
3	CAN	Emanuel Sandhu	3925	2003/2004 season (100%)	850	800	325	0	0
3	CAN	Emanuel Sandhu	3925	2002/2003 season (70%)	595	262	192	0	0
4	CAN	Jeffrey Buttle	3915	2004/2005 season (100%)	1150	750	400	0	0
4	CAN	Jeffrey Buttle	3915	2003/2004 season (100%)	840	400	375	0	0
4	CAN	Jeffrey Buttle	3915	2002/2003 season (70%)	514	210	175	0	0
5	CHN	Chengjiang Li	3620	2004/2005 season (100%)	1000	700	375	0	0
5	CHN	Chengjiang Li	3620	2003/2004 season (100%)	750	375	350	0	0
5	CHN	Chengjiang Li	3620	2002/2003 season (70%)	735	420	262	0	0
6	USA	Michael Weiss	3425	2004/2005 season (100%)	0	350	325	0	0
6	USA	Michael Weiss	3425	2003/2004 season (100%)	950	700	400	0	0
6	USA	Michael Weiss	3425	2002/2003 season (70%)	700	280	227	0	0
7	USA	Evan Lysacek	3350	2004/2005 season (100%)	1100	300	300	0	0
7	USA	Evan Lysacek	3350	2003/2004 season (100%)	770	600	250	0	0
7	USA	Evan Lysacek	3350	2002/2003 season (70%)	479	280	158	0	0
8	FRA	Frédéric Dambier	3070	2004/2005 season (100%)	800	350	0	150	0
8	FRA	Frédéric Dambier	3070	2003/2004 season (100%)	800	350	225	150	0
8	FRA	Frédéric Dambier	3070	2002/2003 season (70%)	416	175	158	70	0
9	USA	Johnny Weir	2950	2004/2005 season (100%)	1050	400	400	0	0
9	USA	Johnny Weir	2950	2003/2004 season (100%)	1000	0	0	100	0
9	USA	Johnny Weir	2950	2002/2003 season (70%)	0	0	0	0	0
10	CHN	Min Zhang	2874	2004/2005 season (100%)	560	350	325	0	0
10	CHN	Min Zhang	2874	2003/2004 season (100%)	900	350	0	0	0
10	CHN	Min Zhang	2874	2002/2003 season (70%)	564	385	262	0	0
11	BEL	Kevin van der Perren	2825	2004/2005 season (100%)	850	300	0	100	0
11	BEL	Kevin van der Perren	2825	2003/2004 season (100%)	550	650	375	0	0
11	BEL	Kevin van der Perren	2825	2002/2003 season (70%)	368	0	0	0	0
12	GER	Stefan Lindemann	2815	2004/2005 season (100%)	770	350	275	150	0
12	GER	Stefan Lindemann	2815	2003/2004 season (100%)	1100	0	0	100	0
12	GER	Stefan Lindemann	2815	2002/2003 season (70%)	318	0	0	70	0
13	RUS	Andrei Griazev	2780	2004/2005 season (100%)	700	250	0	0	0
13	RUS	Andrei Griazev	2780	2003/2004 season (100%)	715	550	250	0	0
13	RUS	Andrei Griazev	2780	2002/2003 season (70%)	0	315	175	0	0
14	USA	Timothy Goebel	2705	2004/2005 season (100%)	750	375	0	0	0
14	USA	Timothy Goebel	2705	2003/2004 season (100%)	0	400	375	0	0
14	USA	Timothy Goebel	2705	2002/2003 season (70%)	805	0	0	0	0
15	SUI	Stéphane Lambiel	2655	2004/2005 season (100%)	1200	0	0	0	0
15	SUI	Stéphane Lambiel	2655	2003/2004 season (100%)	1050	300	0	0	0
15	SUI	Stéphane Lambiel	2655	2002/2003 season (70%)	525	0	0	105	0
16	RUS	Sergei Dobrin	2570	2004/2005 season (100%)	655	400	225	0	0
16	RUS	Sergei Dobrin	2570	2003/2004 season (100%)	505	400	225	0	0
16	RUS	Sergei Dobrin	2570	2002/2003 season (70%)	416	385	175	0	0
17	CAN	Ben Ferreira	2490	2004/2005 season (100%)	735	375	225	0	0
17	CAN	Ben Ferreira	2490	2003/2004 season (100%)	630	275	250	0	0
17	CAN	Ben Ferreira	2490	2002/2003 season (70%)	0	158	0	0	0
18	RUS	Ilia Klimkin	2445	2004/2005 season (100%)	0	0	0	0	0
18	RUS	Ilia Klimkin	2445	2003/2004 season (100%)	770	275	0	0	0
18	RUS	Ilia Klimkin	2445	2002/2003 season (70%)	560	525	280	35	0
19	USA	Ryan Jahnke	2400	2004/2005 season (100%)	0	550	375	0	0
19	USA	Ryan Jahnke	2400	2003/2004 season (100%)	735	275	0	0	0
19	USA	Ryan Jahnke	2400	2002/2003 season (70%)	465	0	0	0	0
20	JPN	Daisuke Takahashi	2178	2004/2005 season (100%)	770	0	0	0	0
20	JPN	Daisuke Takahashi	2178	2003/2004 season (100%)	700	300	250	0	0
20	JPN	Daisuke Takahashi	2178	2002/2003 season (70%)	294	158	0	0	0
21	JPN	Takeshi Honda	2037	2004/2005 season (100%)	0	250	250	0	0
21	JPN	Takeshi Honda	2037	2003/2004 season (100%)	0	375	350	0	0
21	JPN	Takeshi Honda	2037	2002/2003 season (70%)	770	280	262	0	0
22	ROM	Gheorghe Chiper	2030	2004/2005 season (100%)	595	300	0	0	0
22	ROM	Gheorghe Chiper	2030	2003/2004 season (100%)	560	250	0	150	0
22	ROM	Gheorghe Chiper	2030	2002/2003 season (70%)	392	0	0	105	70
23	CAN	Shawn Sawyer	2010	2004/2005 season (100%)	665	325	0	0	0
23	CAN	Shawn Sawyer	2010	2003/2004 season (100%)	445	200	200	0	0
23	CAN	Shawn Sawyer	2010	2002/2003 season (70%)	396	175	52	0	0
24	JPN	Nobunari Oda	1980	2004/2005 season (100%)	715	200	175	0	0
24	JPN	Nobunari Oda	1980	2003/2004 season (100%)	415	250	225	0	0
24	JPN	Nobunari Oda	1980	2002/2003 season (70%)	0	158	70	0	0
25	JPN	Kazumi Kishimoto	1865	2004/2005 season (100%)	525	200	175	0	0
25	JPN	Kazumi Kishimoto	1865	2003/2004 season (100%)	565	225	175	0	0
25	JPN	Kazumi Kishimoto	1865	2002/2003 season (70%)	438	52	0	0	0
26	FRA	Yannick Ponsero	1850	2004/2005 season (100%)	685	250	150	0	0
26	FRA	Yannick Ponsero	1850	2003/2004 season (100%)	475	150	125	0	0
26	FRA	Yannick Ponsero	1850	2002/2003 season (70%)	227	140	88	0	0
27	USA	Matthew Savoie	1830	2004/2005 season (100%)	700	225	0	0	0
27	USA	Matthew Savoie	1830	2003/2004 season (100%)	450	0	0	0	0
27	USA	Matthew Savoie	1830	2002/2003 season (70%)	0	245	210	0	0
28	FRA	Alban Preaubert	1777	2004/2005 season (100%)	475	225	0	0	0
28	FRA	Alban Preaubert	1777	2003/2004 season (100%)	625	225	175	0	0
28	FRA	Alban Preaubert	1777	2002/2003 season (70%)	458	52	0	0	0
29	GER	Andrejs Vlascenko	1742	2004/2005 season (100%)	0	0	0	0	0
29	GER	Andrejs Vlascenko	1742	2003/2004 season (100%)	630	325	0	0	0
29	GER	Andrejs Vlascenko	1742	2002/2003 season (70%)	280	227	175	105	0
30	JPN	Yasuharu Nanri	1740	2004/2005 season (100%)	565	550	250	0	0
30	JPN	Yasuharu Nanri	1740	2003/2004 season (100%)	0	200	175	0	0
30	JPN	Yasuharu Nanri	1740	2002/2003 season (70%)	0	70	0	0	0

==== Ladies' singles (50 skaters) ====
As of March 23, 2005

Rank	Nation	Skater	Points	Season	ISU Championships or Olympics	(Junior) Grand Prix and Final		Selected International Competition	
Rank	Nation	Skater	Points	Season	Best	Best	2nd Best	Best	2nd Best
1	JPN	Shizuka Arakawa	4305	2004/2005 season (100%)	800	750	400	0	0
1	JPN	Shizuka Arakawa	4305	2003/2004 season (100%)	1200	700	375	0	0
1	JPN	Shizuka Arakawa	4305	2002/2003 season (70%)	595	455	245	0	0
2	USA	Sasha Cohen	4290	2004/2005 season (100%)	1150	0	0	0	0
2	USA	Sasha Cohen	4290	2003/2004 season (100%)	1150	750	400	0	0
2	USA	Sasha Cohen	4290	2002/2003 season (70%)	735	560	280	0	0
3	RUS	Irina Slutskaya	3987	2004/2005 season (100%)	1200	800	400	0	0
3	RUS	Irina Slutskaya	3987	2003/2004 season (100%)	800	0	0	0	0
3	RUS	Irina Slutskaya	3987	2002/2003 season (70%)	588	525	262	0	0
4	JPN	Miki Ando	3975	2004/2005 season (100%)	950	650	375	0	0
4	JPN	Miki Ando	3975	2003/2004 season (100%)	1050	600	250	0	0
4	JPN	Miki Ando	3975	2002/2003 season (70%)	479	350	175	0	0
5	JPN	Fumie Suguri	3810	2004/2005 season (100%)	1000	325	325	0	0
5	JPN	Fumie Suguri	3810	2003/2004 season (100%)	900	800	400	0	0
5	JPN	Fumie Suguri	3810	2002/2003 season (70%)	770	385	262	0	0
6	ITA	Carolina Kostner	3745	2004/2005 season (100%)	1100	375	300	0	0
6	ITA	Carolina Kostner	3745	2003/2004 season (100%)	1000	375	0	0	0
6	ITA	Carolina Kostner	3745	2002/2003 season (70%)	525	385	175	105	105
7	HUN	Júlia Sebestyén	3455	2004/2005 season (100%)	735	350	350	0	0
7	HUN	Júlia Sebestyén	3455	2003/2004 season (100%)	950	550	350	100	0
7	HUN	Júlia Sebestyén	3455	2002/2003 season (70%)	539	158	0	35	35
8	JPN	Yoshie Onda	3350	2004/2005 season (100%)	805	600	375	0	0
8	JPN	Yoshie Onda	3350	2003/2004 season (100%)	595	600	375	0	0
8	JPN	Yoshie Onda	3350	2002/2003 season (70%)	490	280	280	0	0
9	UKR	Elena Liashenko	3320	2004/2005 season (100%)	770	275	275	0	0
9	UKR	Elena Liashenko	3320	2003/2004 season (100%)	805	650	400	0	0
9	UKR	Elena Liashenko	3320	2002/2003 season (70%)	630	420	245	0	0
10	FIN	Susanna Pöykiö	3195	2004/2005 season (100%)	850	350	300	150	0
10	FIN	Susanna Pöykiö	3195	2003/2004 season (100%)	665	325	300	150	0
10	FIN	Susanna Pöykiö	3195	2002/2003 season (70%)	392	245	0	105	0
11	CAN	Joannie Rochette	2975	2004/2005 season (100%)	700	700	400	0	0
11	CAN	Joannie Rochette	2975	2003/2004 season (100%)	850	325	0	0	0
11	CAN	Joannie Rochette	2975	2002/2003 season (70%)	416	0	0	0	0
12	RUS	Viktoria Volchkova	2795	2004/2005 season (100%)	0	375	300	150	0
12	RUS	Viktoria Volchkova	2795	2003/2004 season (100%)	500	275	250	0	0
12	RUS	Viktoria Volchkova	2795	2002/2003 season (70%)	700	490	280	0	0
13	USA	Kimmie Meissner	2685	2004/2005 season (100%)	625	500	225	0	0
13	USA	Kimmie Meissner	2685	2003/2004 season (100%)	685	400	250	0	0
13	USA	Kimmie Meissner	2685	2002/2003 season (70%)	0	0	0	0	0
14	JPN	Yukina Ota	2610	2004/2005 season (100%)	0	250	0	0	0
14	JPN	Yukina Ota	2610	2003/2004 season (100%)	840	325	275	0	0
14	JPN	Yukina Ota	2610	2002/2003 season (70%)	500	420	175	0	0
15	USA	Amber Corwin	2560	2004/2005 season (100%)	665	300	225	0	0
15	USA	Amber Corwin	2560	2003/2004 season (100%)	770	325	275	0	0
15	USA	Amber Corwin	2560	2002/2003 season (70%)	441	210	158	0	0
16	UKR	Galina Maniachenko	2495	2004/2005 season (100%)	665	275	0	100	0
16	UKR	Galina Maniachenko	2495	2003/2004 season (100%)	420	350	0	150	0
16	UKR	Galina Maniachenko	2495	2002/2003 season (70%)	465	210	175	105	0
17	RUS	Elena Sokolova	2572	2004/2005 season (100%)	900	350	325	0	0
17	RUS	Elena Sokolova	2572	2003/2004 season (100%)	770	0	0	0	0
17	RUS	Elena Sokolova	2572	2002/2003 season (70%)	805	192	0	0	0
18	USA	Michelle Kwan	2430	2004/2005 season (100%)	1050	0	0	0	0
18	USA	Michelle Kwan	2430	2003/2004 season (100%)	1100	0	0	0	0
18	USA	Michelle Kwan	2430	2002/2003 season (70%)	840	280	0	0	0
19	CAN	Cynthia Phaneuf	2355	2004/2005 season (100%)	250	550	400	0	0
19	CAN	Cynthia Phaneuf	2355	2003/2004 season (100%)	805	200	150	0	0
19	CAN	Cynthia Phaneuf	2355	2002/2003 season (70%)	0	140	88	0	0
20	FIN	Alisa Drei	2285	2004/2005 season (100%)	0	0	0	100	100
20	FIN	Alisa Drei	2285	2003/2004 season (100%)	630	300	250	100	0
20	FIN	Alisa Drei	2285	2002/2003 season (70%)	455	245	0	105	70
21	HUN	Viktória Pavuk	2247	2004/2005 season (100%)	350	0	0	150	0
21	HUN	Viktória Pavuk	2247	2003/2004 season (100%)	735	500	250	0	0
21	HUN	Viktória Pavuk	2247	2002/2003 season (70%)	270	140	122	0	0
22	USA	Jennifer Kirk	2214	2004/2005 season (100%)	770	0	0	0	0
22	USA	Jennifer Kirk	2214	2003/2004 season (100%)	350	375	300	0	0
22	USA	Jennifer Kirk	2214	2002/2003 season (70%)	0	227	192	0	0
23	USA	Beatrisa Liang	2124	2004/2005 season (100%)	630	0	0	0	0
23	USA	Beatrisa Liang	2124	2003/2004 season (100%)	0	325	300	0	0
23	USA	Beatrisa Liang	2124	2002/2003 season (70%)	396	315	158	0	0
24	SWE	Lina Johansson	2109	2004/2005 season (100%)	300	0	0	0	0
24	SWE	Lina Johansson	2109	2003/2004 season (100%)	535	550	250	0	0
24	SWE	Lina Johansson	2109	2002/2003 season (70%)	354	245	175	0	0
25	JPN	Yukari Nakano	2021	2004/2005 season (100%)	490	0	0	0	0
25	JPN	Yukari Nakano	2021	2003/2004 season (100%)	665	225	225	0	0
25	JPN	Yukari Nakano	2021	2002/2003 season (70%)	539	192	175	0	0
26	JPN	Aki Sawada	1945	2004/2005 season (100%)	475	300	225	0	0
26	JPN	Aki Sawada	1945	2003/2004 season (100%)	595	200	150	0	0
26	JPN	Aki Sawada	1945	2002/2003 season (70%)	0	105	0	0	0
27	JPN	Mai Asada	1913	2004/2005 season (100%)	0	150	0	0	0
27	JPN	Mai Asada	1913	2003/2004 season (100%)	625	450	250	0	0
27	JPN	Mai Asada	1913	2002/2003 season (70%)	438	0	0	0	0
28	GER	Annette Dytrt	1815	2004/2005 season (100%)	500	300	275	0	0
28	GER	Annette Dytrt	1815	2003/2004 season (100%)	490	250	0	0	0
28	GER	Annette Dytrt	1815	2002/2003 season (70%)	98	0	0	0	0
29	FIN	Kiira Korpi	1735	2004/2005 season (100%)	445	450	250	0	0
29	FIN	Kiira Korpi	1735	2003/2004 season (100%)	265	200	125	0	0
29	FIN	Kiira Korpi	1735	2002/2003 season (70%)	122	0	0	0	0
30	GBR	Jenna McCorkell	1665	2004/2005 season (100%)	315	275	225	100	0
30	GBR	Jenna McCorkell	1665	2003/2004 season (100%)	385	225	0	0	0
30	GBR	Jenna McCorkell	1665	2002/2003 season (70%)	290	140	52	0	0
31	AUS	Miriam Manzano	1645	2004/2005 season (100%)	560	250	225	0	0
31	AUS	Miriam Manzano	1645	2003/2004 season (100%)	490	0	0	50	0
31	AUS	Miriam Manzano	1645	2002/2003 season (70%)	368	0	0	70	0
32	SUI	Sarah Meier	1605	2004/2005 season (100%)	550	0	0	0	0
32	SUI	Sarah Meier	1605	2003/2004 season (100%)	600	0	0	0	0
32	SUI	Sarah Meier	1605	2002/2003 season (70%)	210	210	175	70	0
33	JPN	Mao Asada	1565	2004/2005 season (100%)	715	600	250	0	0
33	JPN	Mao Asada	1565	2003/2004 season (100%)	0	0	0	0	0
33	JPN	Mao Asada	1565	2002/2003 season (70%)	0	0	0	0	0
34	FRA	Anne Sophie Calvez	1493	2004/2005 season (100%)	0	250	0	0	0
34	FRA	Anne Sophie Calvez	1493	2003/2004 season (100%)	400	275	225	0	0
34	FRA	Anne Sophie Calvez	1493	2002/2003 season (70%)	343	0	0	0	0
35	KOR	Yuna Kim	1485	2004/2005 season (100%)	685	550	250	0	0
35	KOR	Yuna Kim	1485	2003/2004 season (100%)	0	0	0	0	0
35	KOR	Yuna Kim	1485	2002/2003 season (70%)	0	0	0	0	0
36	USA	Alissa Czisny	1478	2004/2005 season (100%)	565	325	0	0	0
36	USA	Alissa Czisny	1478	2003/2004 season (100%)	0	150	0	0	0
36	USA	Alissa Czisny	1478	2002/2003 season (70%)	0	280	158	0	0
37	USA	Katy Taylor	1455	2004/2005 season (100%)	0	200	200	0	0
37	USA	Katy Taylor	1455	2003/2004 season (100%)	655	225	175	0	0
37	USA	Katy Taylor	1455	2002/2003 season (70%)	0	0	0	0	0
38	USA	Danielle Kahle	1440	2004/2005 season (100%)	0	225	200	0	0
38	USA	Danielle Kahle	1440	2003/2004 season (100%)	415	350	250	0	0
38	USA	Danielle Kahle	1440	2002/2003 season (70%)	0	105	0	0	0
39	FIN	Elina Kettunen	1435	2004/2005 season (100%)	490	300	0	50	0
39	FIN	Elina Kettunen	1435	2003/2004 season (100%)	0	0	0	0	0
39	FIN	Elina Kettunen	1435	2002/2003 season (70%)	368	227	0	0	0
40	CHN	Binshu Xu	1425	2004/2005 season (100%)	535	150	125	0	0
40	CHN	Binshu Xu	1425	2003/2004 season (100%)	475	0	0	0	0
40	CHN	Binshu Xu	1425	2002/2003 season (70%)	374	70	70	0	0
41	JPN	Akiko Kitamura	1400	2004/2005 season (100%)	325	350	250	0	0
41	JPN	Akiko Kitamura	1400	2003/2004 season (100%)	0	250	225	0	0
41	JPN	Akiko Kitamura	1400	2002/2003 season (70%)	0	0	0	0	0
42	CHN	Yan Liu	1380	2004/2005 season (100%)	595	225	0	0	0
42	CHN	Yan Liu	1380	2003/2004 season (100%)	560	0	0	0	0
42	CHN	Yan Liu	1380	2002/2003 season (70%)	270	0	0	0	0
43	CHN	Dan Fang	1320	2004/2005 season (100%)	455	0	0	0	0
43	CHN	Dan Fang	1320	2003/2004 season (100%)	455	225	0	0	0
43	CHN	Dan Fang	1320	2002/2003 season (70%)	465	175	0	0	0
44	HUN	Diána Póth	1316	2004/2005 season (100%)	245	0	0	100	50
44	HUN	Diána Póth	1316	2003/2004 season (100%)	0	275	250	100	100
44	HUN	Diána Póth	1316	2002/2003 season (70%)	196	0	0	0	0
45	AUS	Joanne Carter	1310	2004/2005 season (100%)	735	0	0	50	0
45	AUS	Joanne Carter	1310	2003/2004 season (100%)	525	0	0	0	0
45	AUS	Joanne Carter	1310	2002/2003 season (70%)	245	0	0	0	0
46	USA	Angela Nikodinov	1255	2004/2005 season (100%)	0	400	225	0	0
46	USA	Angela Nikodinov	1255	2003/2004 season (100%)	630	0	0	0	0
46	USA	Angela Nikodinov	1255	2002/2003 season (70%)	0	0	0	0	0
47	CRO	Idora Hegel	1210	2004/2005 season (100%)	560	0	0	150	0
47	CRO	Idora Hegel	1210	2003/2004 season (100%)	450	0	0	50	0
47	CRO	Idora Hegel	1210	2002/2003 season (70%)	270	0	0	0	0
48	GEO	Elene Gedevanishvili	1205	2004/2005 season (100%)	595	125	0	0	0
48	GEO	Elene Gedevanishvili	1205	2003/2004 season (100%)	385	100	0	0	0
48	GEO	Elene Gedevanishvili	1205	2002/2003 season (70%)	0	0	0	0	0
49	SVK	Zuzana Babiakova	1190	2004/2005 season (100%)	0	0	0	50	0
49	SVK	Zuzana Babiakova	1190	2003/2004 season (100%)	560	0	0	150	0
49	SVK	Zuzana Babiakova	1190	2002/2003 season (70%)	220	210	0	0	0
50	RUS	Tatiana Basova	1187	2004/2005 season (100%)	0	225	0	0	0
50	RUS	Tatiana Basova	1187	2003/2004 season (100%)	245	300	225	0	0
50	RUS	Tatiana Basova	1187	2002/2003 season (70%)	0	122	70	70	0

==== Pairs (40 couples) ====
As of March 23, 2005

Rank	Nation	Couple	Points	Season	ISU Championships or Olympics	(Junior) Grand Prix and Final		Selected International Competition	
Rank	Nation	Couple	Points	Season	Best	Best	2nd Best	Best	2nd Best
1	RUS	Maria Petrova / Alexei Tikhonov	4540	2004/2005 season (100%)	1150	750	400	0	0
1	RUS	Maria Petrova / Alexei Tikhonov	4540	2003/2004 season (100%)	1050	700	400	0	0
1	RUS	Maria Petrova / Alexei Tikhonov	4540	2002/2003 season (70%)	770	490	262	0	0
2	CHN	Xue Shen / Hongbo Zhao	4515	2004/2005 season (100%)	0	800	400	0	0
2	CHN	Xue Shen / Hongbo Zhao	4515	2003/2004 season (100%)	1150	800	400	0	0
2	CHN	Xue Shen / Hongbo Zhao	4515	2002/2003 season (70%)	840	525	280	0	0
3	RUS	Tatiana Totmianina / Maxim Marinin	4390	2004/2005 season (100%)	1200	0	0	0	0
3	RUS	Tatiana Totmianina / Maxim Marinin	4390	2003/2004 season (100%)	1200	750	400	0	0
3	RUS	Tatiana Totmianina / Maxim Marinin	4390	2002/2003 season (70%)	805	560	280	0	0
4	CHN	Qing Pang / Jian Tong	4225	2004/2005 season (100%)	1050	700	375	0	0
4	CHN	Qing Pang / Jian Tong	4225	2003/2004 season (100%)	1100	600	400	0	0
4	CHN	Qing Pang / Jian Tong	4225	2002/2003 season (70%)	735	262	245	0	0
5	CHN	Dan Zhang / Hao Zhang	4050	2004/2005 season (100%)	1100	600	400	0	0
5	CHN	Dan Zhang / Hao Zhang	4050	2003/2004 season (100%)	1000	550	400	0	0
5	CHN	Dan Zhang / Hao Zhang	4050	2002/2003 season (70%)	665	227	227	0	0
6	RUS	Julia Obertas / Sergei Slavnov	3500	2004/2005 season (100%)	1000	650	375	0	0
6	RUS	Julia Obertas / Sergei Slavnov	3500	2003/2004 season (100%)	900	300	275	0	0
6	RUS	Julia Obertas / Sergei Slavnov	3500	2002/2003 season (70%)	0	0	0	0	0
7	POL	Dorota Zagorska / Mariusz Siudek	3320	2004/2005 season (100%)	900	350	350	0	0
7	POL	Dorota Zagorska / Mariusz Siudek	3320	2003/2004 season (100%)	950	350	350	0	0
7	POL	Dorota Zagorska / Mariusz Siudek	3320	2002/2003 season (70%)	630	420	262	0	0
8	CAN	Anabelle Langlois / Patrice Archetto	3285	2004/2005 season (100%)	0	325	0	0	0
8	CAN	Anabelle Langlois / Patrice Archetto	3285	2003/2004 season (100%)	850	650	375	0	0
8	CAN	Anabelle Langlois / Patrice Archetto	3285	2002/2003 season (70%)	700	385	262	0	0
9	RUS	Maria Mukhortova / Maxim Trankov	2995	2004/2005 season (100%)	715	600	275	0	0
9	RUS	Maria Mukhortova / Maxim Trankov	2995	2003/2004 season (100%)	655	500	250	0	0
9	RUS	Maria Mukhortova / Maxim Trankov	2995	2002/2003 season (70%)	0	0	0	0	0
10	USA	Rena Inoue / John Baldwin Jr.	2975	2004/2005 season (100%)	700	550	350	0	0
10	USA	Rena Inoue / John Baldwin Jr.	2975	2003/2004 season (100%)	750	325	300	0	0
10	USA	Rena Inoue / John Baldwin Jr.	2975	2002/2003 season (70%)	525	210	210	0	0
11	CAN	Valerie Marcoux / Craig Buntin	2930	2004/2005 season (100%)	800	350	300	0	0
11	CAN	Valerie Marcoux / Craig Buntin	2930	2003/2004 season (100%)	800	325	250	0	0
11	CAN	Valerie Marcoux / Craig Buntin	2930	2002/2003 season (70%)	0	192	175	105	0
12	CAN	Jessica Dube / Bryce Davison	2695	2004/2005 season (100%)	685	250	225	0	0
12	CAN	Jessica Dube / Bryce Davison	2695	2003/2004 season (100%)	685	600	250	0	0
12	CAN	Jessica Dube / Bryce Davison	2695	2002/2003 season (70%)	0	0	0	0	0
13	CHN	Yang Ding / Zhongfei Ren	2464	2004/2005 season (100%)	0	325	325	0	0
13	CHN	Yang Ding / Zhongfei Ren	2464	2003/2004 season (100%)	665	250	225	0	0
13	CHN	Yang Ding / Zhongfei Ren	2464	2002/2003 season (70%)	479	420	175	0	0
14	USA	Kathryn Orscher / Garrett Lucash	2410	2004/2005 season (100%)	770	300	275	0	0
14	USA	Kathryn Orscher / Garrett Lucash	2410	2003/2004 season (100%)	630	225	0	0	0
14	USA	Kathryn Orscher / Garrett Lucash	2410	2002/2003 season (70%)	465	175	175	35	0
15	CAN	Elizabeth Putnam / Sean Wirtz	2395	2004/2005 season (100%)	735	300	225	0	0
15	CAN	Elizabeth Putnam / Sean Wirtz	2395	2003/2004 season (100%)	560	300	275	0	0
15	CAN	Elizabeth Putnam / Sean Wirtz	2395	2002/2003 season (70%)	392	0	0	0	0
16	RUS	Tatiana Kokoreva / Egor Golovkin	2355	2004/2005 season (100%)	655	250	175	0	0
16	RUS	Tatiana Kokoreva / Egor Golovkin	2355	2003/2004 season (100%)	625	400	250	0	0
16	RUS	Tatiana Kokoreva / Egor Golovkin	2355	2002/2003 season (70%)	0	140	0	0	0
16	USA	Tiffany Scott / Philip Dulebohn	2355	2004/2005 season (100%)	0	300	250	0	0
16	USA	Tiffany Scott / Philip Dulebohn	2355	2003/2004 season (100%)	595	350	300	0	0
16	USA	Tiffany Scott / Philip Dulebohn	2355	2002/2003 season (70%)	560	210	210	0	0
18	USA	Brittany Vise / Nicholas Kole	2252	2004/2005 season (100%)	0	550	250	0	0
18	USA	Brittany Vise / Nicholas Kole	2252	2003/2004 season (100%)	565	350	225	0	0
18	USA	Brittany Vise / Nicholas Kole	2252	2002/2003 season (70%)	312	140	105	0	0
19	CAN	Utako Wakamatsu / Jean-Sebastien Fecteau	2075	2004/2005 season (100%)	850	300	0	0	0
19	CAN	Utako Wakamatsu / Jean-Sebastien Fecteau	2075	2003/2004 season (100%)	0	325	300	150	150
19	CAN	Utako Wakamatsu / Jean-Sebastien Fecteau	2075	2002/2003 season (70%)	0	0	0	0	0
20	FRA	Marylin Pla / Yannick Bonheur	2013	2004/2005 season (100%)	630	250	225	0	0
20	FRA	Marylin Pla / Yannick Bonheur	2013	2003/2004 season (100%)	595	225	0	0	0
20	FRA	Marylin Pla / Yannick Bonheur	2013	2002/2003 season (70%)	227	88	70	0	0
21	UKR	Julia Beloglazova / Andrei Bekh	1920	2004/2005 season (100%)	560	275	250	0	0
21	UKR	Julia Beloglazova / Andrei Bekh	1920	2003/2004 season (100%)	560	150	125	0	0
21	UKR	Julia Beloglazova / Andrei Bekh	1920	2002/2003 season (70%)	270	88	70	0	0
22	CZE	Katerina Berankova / Otto Dlabola	1907	2004/2005 season (100%)	0	0	0	0	0
22	CZE	Katerina Berankova / Otto Dlabola	1907	2003/2004 season (100%)	700	300	225	0	0
22	CZE	Katerina Berankova / Otto Dlabola	1907	2002/2003 season (70%)	490	192	0	0	0
23	GER	Eva-Maria Fitze / Rico Rex	1875	2004/2005 season (100%)	0	275	225	0	0
23	GER	Eva-Maria Fitze / Rico Rex	1875	2003/2004 season (100%)	650	0	0	0	0
23	GER	Eva-Maria Fitze / Rico Rex	1875	2002/2003 season (70%)	392	175	158	0	0
24	USA	Brooke Castile / Benjamin Okolski	1830	2004/2005 season (100%)	630	200	150	0	0
24	USA	Brooke Castile / Benjamin Okolski	1830	2003/2004 season (100%)	475	200	175	0	0
24	USA	Brooke Castile / Benjamin Okolski	1830	2002/2003 season (70%)	0	88	0	0	0
25	RUS	Natalia Shestakova / Pavel Lebedev	1790	2004/2005 season (100%)	0	275	0	0	0
25	RUS	Natalia Shestakova / Pavel Lebedev	1790	2003/2004 season (100%)	715	550	250	0	0
25	RUS	Natalia Shestakova / Pavel Lebedev	1790	2002/2003 season (70%)	0	0	0	0	0
26	GER	Rebecca Handke / Daniel Wende	1567	2004/2005 season (100%)	665	75	0	50	0
26	GER	Rebecca Handke / Daniel Wende	1567	2003/2004 season (100%)	525	100	100	0	0
26	GER	Rebecca Handke / Daniel Wende	1567	2002/2003 season (70%)	248	52	0	0	0
27	USA	Jennifer Don / Jonathon Hunt	1541	2004/2005 season (100%)	0	325	250	0	0
27	USA	Jennifer Don / Jonathon Hunt	1541	2003/2004 season (100%)	0	0	0	0	0
27	USA	Jennifer Don / Jonathon Hunt	1541	2002/2003 season (70%)	458	350	158	0	0
28	GER	Aliona Savchenko / Robin Szolkowy	1500	2004/2005 season (100%)	950	350	0	150	50
28	GER	Aliona Savchenko / Robin Szolkowy	1500	2003/2004 season (100%)	0	0	0	0	0
28	GER	Aliona Savchenko / Robin Szolkowy	1500	2002/2003 season (70%)	0	0	0	0	0
29	USA	Mariel Miller / Rockne Brubaker	1375	2004/2005 season (100%)	625	500	250	0	0
29	USA	Mariel Miller / Rockne Brubaker	1375	2003/2004 season (100%)	0	0	0	0	0
29	USA	Mariel Miller / Rockne Brubaker	1375	2002/2003 season (70%)	0	0	0	0	0
30	UZB	Marina Aganina / Artem Knyazev	1370	2004/2005 season (100%)	595	250	0	0	0
30	UZB	Marina Aganina / Artem Knyazev	1370	2003/2004 season (100%)	525	0	0	0	0
30	UZB	Marina Aganina / Artem Knyazev	1370	2002/2003 season (70%)	368	0	0	0	0
31	ISR	Julia Shapiro / Vadim Akolzin	1350	2004/2005 season (100%)	525	225	0	0	0
31	ISR	Julia Shapiro / Vadim Akolzin	1350	2003/2004 season (100%)	450	75	75	0	0
31	ISR	Julia Shapiro / Vadim Akolzin	1350	2002/2003 season (70%)	0	0	0	0	0
32	RUS	Viktoria Borzenkova / Andrei Chuvilaev	1345	2004/2005 season (100%)	0	325	275	150	0
32	RUS	Viktoria Borzenkova / Andrei Chuvilaev	1345	2003/2004 season (100%)	0	275	250	0	0
32	RUS	Viktoria Borzenkova / Andrei Chuvilaev	1345	2002/2003 season (70%)	0	192	0	70	0
33	CAN	Michelle Cronin / Brian Shales	1335	2004/2005 season (100%)	535	200	175	0	0
33	CAN	Michelle Cronin / Brian Shales	1335	2003/2004 season (100%)	0	225	200	0	0
33	CAN	Michelle Cronin / Brian Shales	1335	2002/2003 season (70%)	0	122	0	0	0
34	CAN	Pascale Bergeron / Robert Davison	1190	2004/2005 season (100%)	665	225	0	100	0
34	CAN	Pascale Bergeron / Robert Davison	1190	2003/2004 season (100%)	0	0	0	100	100
34	CAN	Pascale Bergeron / Robert Davison	1190	2002/2003 season (70%)	0	0	0	0	0
35	USA	Julia Vlassov / Drew Meekins	1175	2004/2005 season (100%)	475	450	250	0	0
35	USA	Julia Vlassov / Drew Meekins	1175	2003/2004 season (100%)	0	0	0	0	0
35	USA	Julia Vlassov / Drew Meekins	1175	2002/2003 season (70%)	0	0	0	0	0
36	GER	Nicole Noennig / Matthias Bleyer	1074	2004/2005 season (100%)	0	225	0	0	0
36	GER	Nicole Noennig / Matthias Bleyer	1074	2003/2004 season (100%)	0	275	0	0	0
36	GER	Nicole Noennig / Matthias Bleyer	1074	2002/2003 season (70%)	416	158	0	0	0
37	UKR	Tatiana Volosozhar / Stanislav Morozov	1050	2004/2005 season (100%)	750	300	0	0	0
37	UKR	Tatiana Volosozhar / Stanislav Morozov	1050	2003/2004 season (100%)	0	0	0	0	0
37	UKR	Tatiana Volosozhar / Stanislav Morozov	1050	2002/2003 season (70%)	0	0	0	0	0
38	SWE	Angelika Pylkina / Niklas Hogner	995	2004/2005 season (100%)	595	200	200	0	0
38	SWE	Angelika Pylkina / Niklas Hogner	995	2003/2004 season (100%)	0	0	0	0	0
38	SWE	Angelika Pylkina / Niklas Hogner	995	2002/2003 season (70%)	0	0	0	0	0
39	FRA	Sabrina Lefrancois / Jerome Blanchard	975	2004/2005 season (100%)	0	0	0	0	0
39	FRA	Sabrina Lefrancois / Jerome Blanchard	975	2003/2004 season (100%)	700	275	0	0	0
39	FRA	Sabrina Lefrancois / Jerome Blanchard	975	2002/2003 season (70%)	0	0	0	0	0
40	RUS	Elena Efaieva / Alexei Menshikov	965	2004/2005 season (100%)	565	200	200	0	0
40	RUS	Elena Efaieva / Alexei Menshikov	965	2003/2004 season (100%)	0	0	0	0	0
40	RUS	Elena Efaieva / Alexei Menshikov	965	2002/2003 season (70%)	0	0	0	0	0

==== Ice dance (125 couples) ====
As of March 18, 2005

Rank	Nation	Couple	Points	Season	ISU Championships or Olympics	(Junior) Grand Prix and Final		Selected International Competition	
Rank	Nation	Couple	Points	Season	Best	Best	2nd Best	Best	2nd Best
1	RUS	Tatiana Navka / Roman Kostomarov	4925	2004/2005 season (100%)	1200	800	400	0	0
1	RUS	Tatiana Navka / Roman Kostomarov	4925	2003/2004 season (100%)	1200	800	400	0	0
1	RUS	Tatiana Navka / Roman Kostomarov	4925	2002/2003 season (70%)	735	525	262	0	0
2	BUL	Albena Denkova / Maxim Staviski	4790	2004/2005 season (100%)	1000	700	400	150	0
2	BUL	Albena Denkova / Maxim Staviski	4790	2003/2004 season (100%)	1150	750	400	150	0
2	BUL	Albena Denkova / Maxim Staviski	4790	2002/2003 season (70%)	770	490	280	0	0
3	USA	Tanith Belbin / Benjamin Agosto	4400	2004/2005 season (100%)	1150	750	400	0	0
3	USA	Tanith Belbin / Benjamin Agosto	4400	2003/2004 season (100%)	1000	700	400	0	0
3	USA	Tanith Belbin / Benjamin Agosto	4400	2002/2003 season (70%)	630	245	245	0	0
4	UKR	Elena Grushina / Ruslan Goncharov	4005	2004/2005 season (100%)	1100	375	0	0	0
4	UKR	Elena Grushina / Ruslan Goncharov	4005	2003/2004 season (100%)	1050	650	375	0	0
4	UKR	Elena Grushina / Ruslan Goncharov	4005	2002/2003 season (70%)	700	455	280	0	0
5	FRA	Isabelle Delobel / Olivier Schoenfelder	3950	2004/2005 season (100%)	1050	550	350	100	0
5	FRA	Isabelle Delobel / Olivier Schoenfelder	3950	2003/2004 season (100%)	950	600	350	0	0
5	FRA	Isabelle Delobel / Olivier Schoenfelder	3950	2002/2003 season (70%)	560	262	227	0	0
6	CAN	Marie-France Dubreuil / Patrice Lauzon	3660	2004/2005 season (100%)	900	600	375	0	0
6	CAN	Marie-France Dubreuil / Patrice Lauzon	3660	2003/2004 season (100%)	850	550	375	0	0
6	CAN	Marie-France Dubreuil / Patrice Lauzon	3660	2002/2003 season (70%)	525	385	262	0	0
7	ISR	Galit Chait / Sergei Sakhnovski	3645	2004/2005 season (100%)	950	650	375	0	0
7	ISR	Galit Chait / Sergei Sakhnovski	3645	2003/2004 season (100%)	900	350	350	0	0
7	ISR	Galit Chait / Sergei Sakhnovski	3645	2002/2003 season (70%)	665	420	262	0	0
8	RUS	Oksana Domnina / Maxim Shabalin	3045	2004/2005 season (100%)	850	325	325	0	0
8	RUS	Oksana Domnina / Maxim Shabalin	3045	2003/2004 season (100%)	750	275	275	100	0
8	RUS	Oksana Domnina / Maxim Shabalin	3045	2002/2003 season (70%)	500	420	175	0	0
9	ITA	Federica Faiella / Massimo Scali	2980	2004/2005 season (100%)	800	350	300	0	0
9	ITA	Federica Faiella / Massimo Scali	2980	2003/2004 season (100%)	800	325	300	0	0
9	ITA	Federica Faiella / Massimo Scali	2980	2002/2003 season (70%)	490	210	210	105	0
10	USA	Morgan Matthews / Maxim Zavozin	2970	2004/2005 season (100%)	715	600	250	0	0
10	USA	Morgan Matthews / Maxim Zavozin	2970	2003/2004 season (100%)	655	500	250	0	0
10	USA	Morgan Matthews / Maxim Zavozin	2970	2002/2003 season (70%)	290	140	122	0	0
11	USA	Melissa Gregory / Denis Petukhov	2885	2004/2005 season (100%)	805	325	325	0	0
11	USA	Melissa Gregory / Denis Petukhov	2885	2003/2004 season (100%)	735	325	300	0	0
11	USA	Melissa Gregory / Denis Petukhov	2885	2002/2003 season (70%)	465	210	158	70	0
12	HUN	Nora Hoffmann / Attila Elek	2870	2004/2005 season (100%)	525	275	250	0	0
12	HUN	Nora Hoffmann / Attila Elek	2870	2003/2004 season (100%)	685	600	250	150	0
12	HUN	Nora Hoffmann / Attila Elek	2870	2002/2003 season (70%)	479	385	175	0	0
13	CAN	Megan Wing / Aaron Lowe	2770	2004/2005 season (100%)	750	350	300	0	0
13	CAN	Megan Wing / Aaron Lowe	2770	2003/2004 season (100%)	770	300	300	0	0
13	CAN	Megan Wing / Aaron Lowe	2770	2002/2003 season (70%)	490	192	192	0	0
14	RUS	Natalia Mikhailova / Arkadi Sergeev	2620	2004/2005 season (100%)	595	450	250	0	0
14	RUS	Natalia Mikhailova / Arkadi Sergeev	2620	2003/2004 season (100%)	625	450	250	0	0
14	RUS	Natalia Mikhailova / Arkadi Sergeev	2620	2002/2003 season (70%)	396	210	175	0	0
15	RUS	Svetlana Kulikova / Vitali Novikov	2555	2004/2005 season (100%)	630	325	300	0	0
15	RUS	Svetlana Kulikova / Vitali Novikov	2555	2003/2004 season (100%)	600	300	250	150	0
15	RUS	Svetlana Kulikova / Vitali Novikov	2555	2002/2003 season (70%)	0	0	0	0	0
16	RUS	Elena Romanovskaya / Alexander Grachev	2498	2004/2005 season (100%)	0	0	0	0	0
16	RUS	Elena Romanovskaya / Alexander Grachev	2498	2003/2004 season (100%)	715	550	250	0	0
16	RUS	Elena Romanovskaya / Alexander Grachev	2498	2002/2003 season (70%)	458	350	175	0	0
17	JPN	Nozomi Watanabe / Akiyuki Kido	2335	2004/2005 season (100%)	735	225	225	0	0
17	JPN	Nozomi Watanabe / Akiyuki Kido	2335	2003/2004 season (100%)	700	225	225	0	0
17	JPN	Nozomi Watanabe / Akiyuki Kido	2335	2002/2003 season (70%)	392	158	0	0	0
18	CAN	Tessa Virtue / Scott Moir	2200	2004/2005 season (100%)	685	550	250	0	0
18	CAN	Tessa Virtue / Scott Moir	2200	2003/2004 season (100%)	415	175	125	0	0
18	CAN	Tessa Virtue / Scott Moir	2200	2002/2003 season (70%)	0	0	0	0	0
19	ISR	Alexandra Zaretski / Roman Zaretski	2175	2004/2005 season (100%)	625	250	225	0	0
19	ISR	Alexandra Zaretski / Roman Zaretski	2175	2003/2004 season (100%)	475	350	250	0	0
19	ISR	Alexandra Zaretski / Roman Zaretski	2175	2002/2003 season (70%)	354	140	140	0	0
20	AZE	Kristin Fraser / Igor Lukanin	2125	2004/2005 season (100%)	600	300	275	0	0
20	AZE	Kristin Fraser / Igor Lukanin	2125	2003/2004 season (100%)	450	250	250	0	0
20	AZE	Kristin Fraser / Igor Lukanin	2125	2002/2003 season (70%)	420	192	175	0	0
21	ISR	Natalia Gudina / Alexei Beletski	2090	2004/2005 season (100%)	420	275	275	0	0
21	ISR	Natalia Gudina / Alexei Beletski	2090	2003/2004 season (100%)	560	275	250	0	0
21	ISR	Natalia Gudina / Alexei Beletski	2090	2002/2003 season (70%)	385	210	210	35	0
22	GBR	Sinead Kerr / John Kerr	1900	2004/2005 season (100%)	650	300	300	0	0
22	GBR	Sinead Kerr / John Kerr	1900	2003/2004 season (100%)	550	0	0	100	0
22	GBR	Sinead Kerr / John Kerr	1900	2002/2003 season (70%)	0	0	0	0	0
23	ITA	Anna Cappellini / Matteo Zanni	1847	2004/2005 season (100%)	0	500	250	0	0
23	ITA	Anna Cappellini / Matteo Zanni	1847	2003/2004 season (100%)	595	200	200	0	0
23	ITA	Anna Cappellini / Matteo Zanni	1847	2002/2003 season (70%)	102	88	0	0	0
24	UKR	Anna Zadorozhniuk / Sergei Verbillo	1787	2004/2005 season (100%)	0	0	0	150	0
24	UKR	Anna Zadorozhniuk / Sergei Verbillo	1787	2003/2004 season (100%)	535	400	250	0	0
24	UKR	Anna Zadorozhniuk / Sergei Verbillo	1787	2002/2003 season (70%)	206	158	88	0	0
25	GER	Christina Beier / William Beier	1731	2004/2005 season (100%)	350	250	0	0	0
25	GER	Christina Beier / William Beier	1731	2003/2004 season (100%)	315	225	0	0	0
25	GER	Christina Beier / William Beier	1731	2002/2003 season (70%)	416	315	175	0	0
26	CAN	Lauren Senft / Leif Gislason	1730	2004/2005 season (100%)	700	150	0	0	0
26	CAN	Lauren Senft / Leif Gislason	1730	2003/2004 season (100%)	505	200	175	0	0
26	CAN	Lauren Senft / Leif Gislason	1730	2002/2003 season (70%)	0	0	0	0	0
27	UKR	Julia Golovina / Oleg Voiko	1678	2004/2005 season (100%)	315	275	250	0	0
27	UKR	Julia Golovina / Oleg Voiko	1678	2003/2004 season (100%)	350	225	0	0	0
27	UKR	Julia Golovina / Oleg Voiko	1678	2002/2003 season (70%)	245	158	0	105	0
28	FRA	Nathalie Pechalat / Fabien Bourzat	1655	2004/2005 season (100%)	455	250	225	0	0
28	FRA	Nathalie Pechalat / Fabien Bourzat	1655	2003/2004 season (100%)	250	250	225	0	0
28	FRA	Nathalie Pechalat / Fabien Bourzat	1655	2002/2003 season (70%)	0	0	0	0	0
29	CZE	Petra Pachlova / Petr Knoth	1610	2004/2005 season (100%)	415	225	175	0	0
29	CZE	Petra Pachlova / Petr Knoth	1610	2003/2004 season (100%)	445	200	150	0	0
29	CZE	Petra Pachlova / Petr Knoth	1610	2002/2003 season (70%)	248	122	122	0	0
30	USA	Loren Galler-Rabinowitz / David Mitchell	1563	2004/2005 season (100%)	0	0	0	0	0
30	USA	Loren Galler-Rabinowitz / David Mitchell	1563	2003/2004 season (100%)	595	250	0	0	0
30	USA	Loren Galler-Rabinowitz / David Mitchell	1563	2002/2003 season (70%)	438	140	140	0	0
31	FRA	Roxane Petetin / Mathieu Jost	1501	2004/2005 season (100%)	0	0	0	0	0
31	FRA	Roxane Petetin / Mathieu Jost	1501	2003/2004 season (100%)	455	275	225	0	0
31	FRA	Roxane Petetin / Mathieu Jost	1501	2002/2003 season (70%)	196	192	158	0	0
32	RUS	Ekaterina Rubleva / Ivan Shefer	1473	2004/2005 season (100%)	0	0	0	50	0
32	RUS	Ekaterina Rubleva / Ivan Shefer	1473	2003/2004 season (100%)	565	300	225	0	0
32	RUS	Ekaterina Rubleva / Ivan Shefer	1473	2002/2003 season (70%)	0	175	158	0	0
33	ARM	Anastasia Grebenkina / Vazgen Azrojan	1285	2004/2005 season (100%)	490	225	0	0	0
33	ARM	Anastasia Grebenkina / Vazgen Azrojan	1285	2003/2004 season (100%)	420	0	0	150	0
33	ARM	Anastasia Grebenkina / Vazgen Azrojan	1285	2002/2003 season (70%)	35	0	0	0	0
34	RUS	Anastasia Gorshkova / Ilia Tkachenko	1280	2004/2005 season (100%)	655	400	225	0	0
34	RUS	Anastasia Gorshkova / Ilia Tkachenko	1280	2003/2004 season (100%)	0	0	0	0	0
34	RUS	Anastasia Gorshkova / Ilia Tkachenko	1280	2002/2003 season (70%)	0	0	0	0	0
35	CAN	Siobhan Karam / Joshua McGrath	1260	2004/2005 season (100%)	535	225	150	0	0
35	CAN	Siobhan Karam / Joshua McGrath	1260	2003/2004 season (100%)	0	175	175	0	0
35	CAN	Siobhan Karam / Joshua McGrath	1260	2002/2003 season (70%)	0	140	105	0	0
36	CHN	Fang Yang / Chongbo Gao	1190	2004/2005 season (100%)	525	0	0	0	0
36	CHN	Fang Yang / Chongbo Gao	1190	2003/2004 season (100%)	665	0	0	0	0
36	CHN	Fang Yang / Chongbo Gao	1190	2002/2003 season (70%)	368	0	0	0	0
37	JPN	Nakako Tsuzuki / Kenji Miyamoto	1155	2004/2005 season (100%)	595	0	0	0	0
37	JPN	Nakako Tsuzuki / Kenji Miyamoto	1155	2003/2004 season (100%)	560	0	0	0	0
37	JPN	Nakako Tsuzuki / Kenji Miyamoto	1155	2002/2003 season (70%)	0	0	0	0	0
38	USA	Meryl Davis / Charlie White	1105	2004/2005 season (100%)	0	200	200	0	0
38	USA	Meryl Davis / Charlie White	1105	2003/2004 season (100%)	355	175	175	0	0
38	USA	Meryl Davis / Charlie White	1105	2002/2003 season (70%)	0	88	52	0	0
39	CHN	Xiaoyang Yu / Chen Wang	1067	2004/2005 season (100%)	490	0	0	0	0
39	CHN	Xiaoyang Yu / Chen Wang	1067	2003/2004 season (100%)	525	0	0	0	0
39	CHN	Xiaoyang Yu / Chen Wang	1067	2002/2003 season (70%)	343	52	0	0	0
40	USA	Trina Pratt / Todd Gilles	1005	2004/2005 season (100%)	505	200	200	0	0
40	USA	Trina Pratt / Todd Gilles	1005	2003/2004 season (100%)	0	100	0	0	0
40	USA	Trina Pratt / Todd Gilles	1005	2002/2003 season (70%)	0	0	0	0	0
41	ITA	Alessia Aureli / Andrea Vaturi	997	2004/2005 season (100%)	245	0	0	0	0
41	ITA	Alessia Aureli / Andrea Vaturi	997	2003/2004 season (100%)	175	0	0	0	0
41	ITA	Alessia Aureli / Andrea Vaturi	997	2002/2003 season (70%)	332	245	175	0	0
42	RUS	Jana Khokhlova / Sergei Novitski	950	2004/2005 season (100%)	0	275	250	0	0
42	RUS	Jana Khokhlova / Sergei Novitski	950	2003/2004 season (100%)	0	275	0	100	50
42	RUS	Jana Khokhlova / Sergei Novitski	950	2002/2003 season (70%)	0	0	0	0	0
43	EST	Grethe Grünberg / Kristian Rand	925	2004/2005 season (100%)	295	125	50	0	0
43	EST	Grethe Grünberg / Kristian Rand	925	2003/2004 season (100%)	205	125	125	0	0
43	EST	Grethe Grünberg / Kristian Rand	925	2002/2003 season (70%)	0	0	0	0	0
44	RUS	Anastasia Platonova / Andrei Maksimishin	900	2004/2005 season (100%)	0	350	250	0	0
44	RUS	Anastasia Platonova / Andrei Maksimishin	900	2003/2004 season (100%)	0	200	100	0	0
44	RUS	Anastasia Platonova / Andrei Maksimishin	900	2002/2003 season (70%)	0	0	0	0	0
45	FRA	Pernelle Carron / Edouard Dezutter	895	2004/2005 season (100%)	0	200	125	0	0
45	FRA	Pernelle Carron / Edouard Dezutter	895	2003/2004 season (100%)	295	150	125	0	0
45	FRA	Pernelle Carron / Edouard Dezutter	895	2002/2003 season (70%)	0	88	52	0	0
46	ITA	Camilla Pistorello / Luca La Notte	850	2004/2005 season (100%)	475	225	150	0	0
46	ITA	Camilla Pistorello / Luca La Notte	850	2003/2004 season (100%)	0	0	0	0	0
46	ITA	Camilla Pistorello / Luca La Notte	850	2002/2003 season (70%)	0	0	0	0	0
47	AUS	Natalie Buck / Trent Nelson-Bond	840	2004/2005 season (100%)	385	0	0	0	0
47	AUS	Natalie Buck / Trent Nelson-Bond	840	2003/2004 season (100%)	455	0	0	0	0
47	AUS	Natalie Buck / Trent Nelson-Bond	840	2002/2003 season (70%)	0	0	0	0	0
48	CHN	Xintong Huang / Xun Zheng	825	2004/2005 season (100%)	325	150	125	0	0
48	CHN	Xintong Huang / Xun Zheng	825	2003/2004 season (100%)	175	50	0	0	0
48	CHN	Xintong Huang / Xun Zheng	825	2002/2003 season (70%)	0	0	0	0	0
49	POL	Sylwia Nowak / Sebastian Kolasinski	794	2004/2005 season (100%)	0	0	0	0	0
49	POL	Sylwia Nowak / Sebastian Kolasinski	794	2003/2004 season (100%)	0	0	0	0	0
49	POL	Sylwia Nowak / Sebastian Kolasinski	794	2002/2003 season (70%)	392	210	192	0	0
50	POL	Alexandra Kauc / Michal Zych	765	2004/2005 season (100%)	280	0	0	100	0
50	POL	Alexandra Kauc / Michal Zych	765	2003/2004 season (100%)	385	0	0	0	0
50	POL	Alexandra Kauc / Michal Zych	765	2002/2003 season (70%)	0	0	0	0	0
51	GBR	Pamela O'Connor / Jonathon O'Dougherty	755	2004/2005 season (100%)	385	0	0	0	0
51	GBR	Pamela O'Connor / Jonathon O'Dougherty	755	2003/2004 season (100%)	0	0	0	100	50
51	GBR	Pamela O'Connor / Jonathon O'Dougherty	755	2002/2003 season (70%)	220	0	0	0	0
52	CZE	Kamila Hajkova / David Vincour	745	2004/2005 season (100%)	445	175	100	0	0
52	CZE	Kamila Hajkova / David Vincour	745	2003/2004 season (100%)	0	25	0	0	0
52	CZE	Kamila Hajkova / David Vincour	745	2002/2003 season (70%)	0	0	0	0	0
53	RUS	Olga Orlova / Maxim Bolotin	738	2004/2005 season (100%)	0	0	0	0	0
53	RUS	Olga Orlova / Maxim Bolotin	738	2003/2004 season (100%)	0	250	225	0	0
53	RUS	Olga Orlova / Maxim Bolotin	738	2002/2003 season (70%)	0	158	105	0	0
54	GER	Sandra Gissmann / Alexander Gazsi	735	2004/2005 season (100%)	0	125	100	0	0
54	GER	Sandra Gissmann / Alexander Gazsi	735	2003/2004 season (100%)	235	150	125	0	0
54	GER	Sandra Gissmann / Alexander Gazsi	735	2002/2003 season (70%)	0	0	0	0	0
55	HUN	Zsuzsanna Nagy / György Elek	703	2004/2005 season (100%)	0	125	100	0	0
55	HUN	Zsuzsanna Nagy / György Elek	703	2003/2004 season (100%)	265	100	75	0	0
55	HUN	Zsuzsanna Nagy / György Elek	703	2002/2003 season (70%)	38	0	0	0	0
56	AUS	Danika Bourne / Alexander Pavlov	700	2004/2005 season (100%)	280	0	0	0	0
56	AUS	Danika Bourne / Alexander Pavlov	700	2003/2004 season (100%)	420	0	0	0	0
56	AUS	Danika Bourne / Alexander Pavlov	700	2002/2003 season (70%)	0	0	0	0	0
57	GER	Rina Thieleke / Sascha Rabe	660	2004/2005 season (100%)	385	125	75	0	0
57	GER	Rina Thieleke / Sascha Rabe	660	2003/2004 season (100%)	0	75	0	0	0
57	GER	Rina Thieleke / Sascha Rabe	660	2002/2003 season (70%)	0	0	0	0	0
58	CHN	Jia Qi / Xu Sun	625	2004/2005 season (100%)	0	0	0	0	0
58	CHN	Jia Qi / Xu Sun	625	2003/2004 season (100%)	490	100	0	0	0
58	CHN	Jia Qi / Xu Sun	625	2002/2003 season (70%)	0	35	0	0	0
59	CHN	Weina Zhang / Xianming Cao	599	2004/2005 season (100%)	0	0	0	0	0
59	CHN	Weina Zhang / Xianming Cao	599	2003/2004 season (100%)	0	0	0	0	0
59	CHN	Weina Zhang / Xianming Cao	599	2002/2003 season (70%)	441	158	0	0	0
60	UKR	Alla Beknazarova / Vladimir Zuev	560	2004/2005 season (100%)	0	0	0	0	0
60	UKR	Alla Beknazarova / Vladimir Zuev	560	2003/2004 season (100%)	385	175	0	0	0
60	UKR	Alla Beknazarova / Vladimir Zuev	560	2002/2003 season (70%)	0	0	0	0	0
61	POL	Joanna Budner / Jan Moscicki	540	2004/2005 season (100%)	265	50	25	0	0
61	POL	Joanna Budner / Jan Moscicki	540	2003/2004 season (100%)	55	75	0	0	0
61	POL	Joanna Budner / Jan Moscicki	540	2002/2003 season (70%)	0	70	0	0	0
62	CAN	Allie McCurdy / Michael Coreno	525	2004/2005 season (100%)	0	300	225	0	0
62	CAN	Allie McCurdy / Michael Coreno	525	2003/2004 season (100%)	0	0	0	0	0
62	CAN	Allie McCurdy / Michael Coreno	525	2002/2003 season (70%)	0	0	0	0	0
63	AUT	Barbara Herzog / Dmitri Matsjuk	466	2004/2005 season (100%)	0	0	0	0	0
63	AUT	Barbara Herzog / Dmitri Matsjuk	466	2003/2004 season (100%)	280	0	0	0	0
63	AUT	Barbara Herzog / Dmitri Matsjuk	466	2002/2003 season (70%)	186	0	0	0	0
64	GER	Judith Haunstetter / Arne Hönlein	461	2004/2005 season (100%)	0	0	0	0	0
64	GER	Judith Haunstetter / Arne Hönlein	461	2003/2004 season (100%)	325	75	25	0	0
64	GER	Judith Haunstetter / Arne Hönlein	461	2002/2003 season (70%)	18	18	0	0	0
65	ITA	Camilla Spelta / Luca La Notte	443	2004/2005 season (100%)	0	0	0	0	0
65	ITA	Camilla Spelta / Luca La Notte	443	2003/2004 season (100%)	0	225	200	0	0
65	ITA	Camilla Spelta / Luca La Notte	443	2002/2003 season (70%)	0	18	0	0	0
66	KOR	Hye Min Kim / Min Woo Kim	400	2004/2005 season (100%)	350	0	0	0	0
66	KOR	Hye Min Kim / Min Woo Kim	400	2003/2004 season (100%)	0	50	0	0	0
66	KOR	Hye Min Kim / Min Woo Kim	400	2002/2003 season (70%)	0	0	0	0	0
67	SUI	Daniela Keller / Fabian Keller	398	2004/2005 season (100%)	175	0	0	0	0
67	SUI	Daniela Keller / Fabian Keller	398	2003/2004 season (100%)	145	25	0	0	0
67	SUI	Daniela Keller / Fabian Keller	398	2002/2003 season (70%)	80	35	18	0	0
68	RUS	Olga Gmizina / Ivan Lobanov	388	2004/2005 season (100%)	0	150	0	0	0
68	RUS	Olga Gmizina / Ivan Lobanov	388	2003/2004 season (100%)	0	150	0	0	0
68	RUS	Olga Gmizina / Ivan Lobanov	388	2002/2003 season (70%)	0	88	0	0	0
69	FIN	Jessica Huot / Juha Valkama	385	2004/2005 season (100%)	0	0	0	0	0
69	FIN	Jessica Huot / Juha Valkama	385	2003/2004 season (100%)	245	0	0	0	0
69	FIN	Jessica Huot / Juha Valkama	385	2002/2003 season (70%)	140	0	0	0	0
70	FRA	Elodie Brouille / Lionel Rumi	375	2004/2005 season (100%)	0	125	75	0	0
70	FRA	Elodie Brouille / Lionel Rumi	375	2003/2004 season (100%)	0	125	50	0	0
70	FRA	Elodie Brouille / Lionel Rumi	375	2002/2003 season (70%)	0	0	0	0	0
71	CZE	Diana Janostakova / Jiří Procházka	360	2004/2005 season (100%)	210	0	0	150	0
71	CZE	Diana Janostakova / Jiří Procházka	360	2003/2004 season (100%)	0	0	0	0	0
71	CZE	Diana Janostakova / Jiří Procházka	360	2002/2003 season (70%)	0	0	0	0	0
72	RUS	Olga Orlova / Anton Saulin	350	2004/2005 season (100%)	0	175	175	0	0
72	RUS	Olga Orlova / Anton Saulin	350	2003/2004 season (100%)	0	0	0	0	0
72	RUS	Olga Orlova / Anton Saulin	350	2002/2003 season (70%)	0	0	0	0	0
73	UKR	Alina Saprikina / Pavel Khimich	335	2004/2005 season (100%)	235	75	25	0	0
73	UKR	Alina Saprikina / Pavel Khimich	335	2003/2004 season (100%)	0	0	0	0	0
73	UKR	Alina Saprikina / Pavel Khimich	335	2002/2003 season (70%)	0	0	0	0	0
74	UKR	Elena Georgieva / Mikhail Tikhonravov	330	2004/2005 season (100%)	205	50	25	0	0
74	UKR	Elena Georgieva / Mikhail Tikhonravov	330	2003/2004 season (100%)	0	50	0	0	0
74	UKR	Elena Georgieva / Mikhail Tikhonravov	330	2002/2003 season (70%)	0	0	0	0	0
75	USA	Christie Moxley / Alexandr Kirsanov	325	2004/2005 season (100%)	0	0	0	0	0
75	USA	Christie Moxley / Alexandr Kirsanov	325	2003/2004 season (100%)	0	275	0	50	0
75	USA	Christie Moxley / Alexandr Kirsanov	325	2002/2003 season (70%)	0	0	0	0	0
75	CAN	Martine Patenaude / Pascal Denis	325	2004/2005 season (100%)	0	225	0	100	0
75	CAN	Martine Patenaude / Pascal Denis	325	2003/2004 season (100%)	0	0	0	0	0
75	CAN	Martine Patenaude / Pascal Denis	325	2002/2003 season (70%)	0	0	0	0	0
77	RUS	Ksenia Shmirina / Alexander Baidukov	300	2004/2005 season (100%)	0	0	0	0	0
77	RUS	Ksenia Shmirina / Alexander Baidukov	300	2003/2004 season (100%)	0	175	125	0	0
77	RUS	Ksenia Shmirina / Alexander Baidukov	300	2002/2003 season (70%)	0	0	0	0	0
78	FRA	Eve Bentley / Cedric Pernet	285	2004/2005 season (100%)	0	250	0	0	0
78	FRA	Eve Bentley / Cedric Pernet	285	2003/2004 season (100%)	0	0	0	0	0
78	FRA	Eve Bentley / Cedric Pernet	285	2002/2003 season (70%)	0	0	0	35	0
79	GBR	Marika Humphreys / Vitali Baranov	280	2004/2005 season (100%)	0	0	0	0	0
79	GBR	Marika Humphreys / Vitali Baranov	280	2003/2004 season (100%)	0	0	0	0	0
79	GBR	Marika Humphreys / Vitali Baranov	280	2002/2003 season (70%)	0	175	0	105	0
80	GBR	Candice Towler-Green / James Phillipson	262	2004/2005 season (100%)	0	0	0	0	0
80	GBR	Candice Towler-Green / James Phillipson	262	2003/2004 season (100%)	0	0	0	0	0
80	GBR	Candice Towler-Green / James Phillipson	262	2002/2003 season (70%)	122	105	35	0	0
81	EST	Marina Timofeieva / Evgeni Striganov	251	2004/2005 season (100%)	0	0	0	0	0
81	EST	Marina Timofeieva / Evgeni Striganov	251	2003/2004 season (100%)	0	0	0	0	0
81	EST	Marina Timofeieva / Evgeni Striganov	251	2002/2003 season (70%)	164	52	35	0	0
82	POL	Agnieszka Dulej / Slawomir Janicki	238	2004/2005 season (100%)	0	0	0	0	0
82	POL	Agnieszka Dulej / Slawomir Janicki	238	2003/2004 season (100%)	140	0	0	0	0
82	POL	Agnieszka Dulej / Slawomir Janicki	238	2002/2003 season (70%)	98	0	0	0	0
83	USA	Kendra Goodwin / Brent Bommentre	225	2004/2005 season (100%)	0	225	0	0	0
83	USA	Kendra Goodwin / Brent Bommentre	225	2003/2004 season (100%)	0	0	0	0	0
83	USA	Kendra Goodwin / Brent Bommentre	225	2002/2003 season (70%)	0	0	0	0	0
83	USA	Caitlin Mallory / Brent Holdburg	225	2004/2005 season (100%)	0	175	50	0	0
83	USA	Caitlin Mallory / Brent Holdburg	225	2003/2004 season (100%)	0	0	0	0	0
83	USA	Caitlin Mallory / Brent Holdburg	225	2002/2003 season (70%)	0	0	0	0	0
85	BLR	Anna Galcheniuk / Oleg Krupen	215	2004/2005 season (100%)	140	75	0	0	0
85	BLR	Anna Galcheniuk / Oleg Krupen	215	2003/2004 season (100%)	0	0	0	0	0
85	BLR	Anna Galcheniuk / Oleg Krupen	215	2002/2003 season (70%)	0	0	0	0	0
86	GER	Michelle Chrudinak / Benjamin Blum	200	2004/2005 season (100%)	0	100	100	0	0
86	GER	Michelle Chrudinak / Benjamin Blum	200	2003/2004 season (100%)	0	0	0	0	0
86	GER	Michelle Chrudinak / Benjamin Blum	200	2002/2003 season (70%)	0	0	0	0	0
86	LTU	Kayla Nicole Frey / Deividas Stagniunas	200	2004/2005 season (100%)	175	25	0	0	0
86	LTU	Kayla Nicole Frey / Deividas Stagniunas	200	2003/2004 season (100%)	0	0	0	0	0
86	LTU	Kayla Nicole Frey / Deividas Stagniunas	200	2002/2003 season (70%)	0	0	0	0	0
88	RUS	Ksenia Antonova / Roman Mylnikov	175	2004/2005 season (100%)	0	175	0	0	0
88	RUS	Ksenia Antonova / Roman Mylnikov	175	2003/2004 season (100%)	0	0	0	0	0
88	RUS	Ksenia Antonova / Roman Mylnikov	175	2002/2003 season (70%)	0	0	0	0	0
88	CAN	Mylene Lamoureux / Michael Mee	175	2004/2005 season (100%)	0	175	0	0	0
88	CAN	Mylene Lamoureux / Michael Mee	175	2003/2004 season (100%)	0	0	0	0	0
88	CAN	Mylene Lamoureux / Michael Mee	175	2002/2003 season (70%)	0	0	0	0	0
88	USA	Kimmerly Lauten / Augie Hill	175	2004/2005 season (100%)	0	100	75	0	0
88	USA	Kimmerly Lauten / Augie Hill	175	2003/2004 season (100%)	0	0	0	0	0
88	USA	Kimmerly Lauten / Augie Hill	175	2002/2003 season (70%)	0	0	0	0	0
91	ITA	Marta Paoletti / Fabrizio Pedrazzini	172	2004/2005 season (100%)	0	0	0	0	0
91	ITA	Marta Paoletti / Fabrizio Pedrazzini	172	2003/2004 season (100%)	0	0	0	0	0
91	ITA	Marta Paoletti / Fabrizio Pedrazzini	172	2002/2003 season (70%)	172	0	0	0	0
92	RUS	Polina Jakobs / Anton Saulin	152	2004/2005 season (100%)	0	0	0	0	0
92	RUS	Polina Jakobs / Anton Saulin	152	2003/2004 season (100%)	0	100	0	0	0
92	RUS	Polina Jakobs / Anton Saulin	152	2002/2003 season (70%)	0	52	0	0	0
93	RUS	Kristina Gorshkova / Vitali Butikov	150	2004/2005 season (100%)	0	150	0	0	0
93	RUS	Kristina Gorshkova / Vitali Butikov	150	2003/2004 season (100%)	0	0	0	0	0
93	RUS	Kristina Gorshkova / Vitali Butikov	150	2002/2003 season (70%)	0	0	0	0	0
93	CAN	Alice Graham / Andrew Poje	150	2004/2005 season (100%)	0	150	0	0	0
93	CAN	Alice Graham / Andrew Poje	150	2003/2004 season (100%)	0	0	0	0	0
93	CAN	Alice Graham / Andrew Poje	150	2002/2003 season (70%)	0	0	0	0	0
93	USA	Lydia Manon / Ryan O'Meara	150	2004/2005 season (100%)	0	0	0	150	0
93	USA	Lydia Manon / Ryan O'Meara	150	2003/2004 season (100%)	0	0	0	0	0
93	USA	Lydia Manon / Ryan O'Meara	150	2002/2003 season (70%)	0	0	0	0	0
93	GBR	Phillipa Towler-Green / Phillip Poole	150	2004/2005 season (100%)	0	0	0	100	50
93	GBR	Phillipa Towler-Green / Phillip Poole	150	2003/2004 season (100%)	0	0	0	0	0
93	GBR	Phillipa Towler-Green / Phillip Poole	150	2002/2003 season (70%)	0	0	0	0	0
93	RUS	Julia Zlobina / Alexei Sitnikov	150	2004/2005 season (100%)	0	150	0	0	0
93	RUS	Julia Zlobina / Alexei Sitnikov	150	2003/2004 season (100%)	0	0	0	0	0
93	RUS	Julia Zlobina / Alexei Sitnikov	150	2002/2003 season (70%)	0	0	0	0	0
98	GEO	Tatiana Siniaver / Tornike Tukvadze	147	2004/2005 season (100%)	0	0	0	0	0
98	GEO	Tatiana Siniaver / Tornike Tukvadze	147	2003/2004 season (100%)	0	0	0	0	0
98	GEO	Tatiana Siniaver / Tornike Tukvadze	147	2002/2003 season (70%)	147	0	0	0	0
99	FRA	Floriane Rokia / Damien Biancotto	146	2004/2005 season (100%)	0	0	0	0	0
99	FRA	Floriane Rokia / Damien Biancotto	146	2003/2004 season (100%)	0	0	0	0	0
99	FRA	Floriane Rokia / Damien Biancotto	146	2002/2003 season (70%)	59	52	35	0	0
100	GBR	Michelle Royds / Jamie Whyte	135	2004/2005 season (100%)	0	0	0	0	0
100	GBR	Michelle Royds / Jamie Whyte	135	2003/2004 season (100%)	85	50	0	0	0
100	GBR	Michelle Royds / Jamie Whyte	135	2002/2003 season (70%)	0	0	0	0	0
101	UKR	Alisa Agafonova / Dmitro Dun	125	2004/2005 season (100%)	0	100	25	0	0
101	UKR	Alisa Agafonova / Dmitro Dun	125	2003/2004 season (100%)	0	0	0	0	0
101	UKR	Alisa Agafonova / Dmitro Dun	125	2002/2003 season (70%)	0	0	0	0	0
101	GER	Carolina Hermann / Daniel Hermann	125	2004/2005 season (100%)	0	25	0	0	0
101	GER	Carolina Hermann / Daniel Hermann	125	2003/2004 season (100%)	0	50	50	0	0
101	GER	Carolina Hermann / Daniel Hermann	125	2002/2003 season (70%)	0	0	0	0	0
103	GEO	Marina Sheltsina / Otar Japaridze	115	2004/2005 season (100%)	0	0	0	0	0
103	GEO	Marina Sheltsina / Otar Japaridze	115	2003/2004 season (100%)	115	0	0	0	0
103	GEO	Marina Sheltsina / Otar Japaridze	115	2002/2003 season (70%)	0	0	0	0	0
104	LTU	Clover Zatzman / Aurimas Radisauskas	105	2004/2005 season (100%)	0	0	0	0	0
104	LTU	Clover Zatzman / Aurimas Radisauskas	105	2003/2004 season (100%)	105	0	0	0	0
104	LTU	Clover Zatzman / Aurimas Radisauskas	105	2002/2003 season (70%)	0	0	0	0	0
105	SVK	Ivana Dlhopolcekova / Hynek Bilek	100	2004/2005 season (100%)	0	0	0	50	50
105	SVK	Ivana Dlhopolcekova / Hynek Bilek	100	2003/2004 season (100%)	0	0	0	0	0
105	SVK	Ivana Dlhopolcekova / Hynek Bilek	100	2002/2003 season (70%)	0	0	0	0	0
105	USA	Jane Summersett / Elliott Pennington	100	2004/2005 season (100%)	0	100	0	0	0
105	USA	Jane Summersett / Elliott Pennington	100	2003/2004 season (100%)	0	0	0	0	0
105	USA	Jane Summersett / Elliott Pennington	100	2002/2003 season (70%)	0	0	0	0	0
107	ITA	Letizia Alessandrini / Marco Mattucci	75	2004/2005 season (100%)	0	0	0	0	0
107	ITA	Letizia Alessandrini / Marco Mattucci	75	2003/2004 season (100%)	0	75	0	0	0
107	ITA	Letizia Alessandrini / Marco Mattucci	75	2002/2003 season (70%)	0	0	0	0	0
107	FRA	Laetitia Fenet / David Pissard	75	2004/2005 season (100%)	0	75	0	0	0
107	FRA	Laetitia Fenet / David Pissard	75	2003/2004 season (100%)	0	0	0	0	0
107	FRA	Laetitia Fenet / David Pissard	75	2002/2003 season (70%)	0	0	0	0	0
107	ITA	Marilu Guarneri / Alessandro Caspani	75	2004/2005 season (100%)	0	0	0	0	0
107	ITA	Marilu Guarneri / Alessandro Caspani	75	2003/2004 season (100%)	0	75	0	0	0
107	ITA	Marilu Guarneri / Alessandro Caspani	75	2002/2003 season (70%)	0	0	0	0	0
107	GER	Tanja Kolbe / Paul Boll	75	2004/2005 season (100%)	0	75	0	0	0
107	GER	Tanja Kolbe / Paul Boll	75	2003/2004 season (100%)	0	0	0	0	0
107	GER	Tanja Kolbe / Paul Boll	75	2002/2003 season (70%)	0	0	0	0	0
107	RUS	Alisa Suchkova / Valentin Kuziaev	75	2004/2005 season (100%)	0	75	0	0	0
107	RUS	Alisa Suchkova / Valentin Kuziaev	75	2003/2004 season (100%)	0	0	0	0	0
107	RUS	Alisa Suchkova / Valentin Kuziaev	75	2002/2003 season (70%)	0	0	0	0	0
107	USA	Mimi Whetstone / Benjamin Cohen	75	2004/2005 season (100%)	0	0	0	0	0
107	USA	Mimi Whetstone / Benjamin Cohen	75	2003/2004 season (100%)	0	75	0	0	0
107	USA	Mimi Whetstone / Benjamin Cohen	75	2002/2003 season (70%)	0	0	0	0	0
113	USA	Adrienne Koob-Doddy / Robert Antonelli	50	2004/2005 season (100%)	0	50	0	0	0
113	USA	Adrienne Koob-Doddy / Robert Antonelli	50	2003/2004 season (100%)	0	0	0	0	0
113	USA	Adrienne Koob-Doddy / Robert Antonelli	50	2002/2003 season (70%)	0	0	0	0	0
113	UKR	Olga Oksenich / Oleg Tazetdinov	50	2004/2005 season (100%)	0	50	0	0	0
113	UKR	Olga Oksenich / Oleg Tazetdinov	50	2003/2004 season (100%)	0	0	0	0	0
113	UKR	Olga Oksenich / Oleg Tazetdinov	50	2002/2003 season (70%)	0	0	0	0	0
113	CAN	Maggy Pellerin / Dominique Dupuis	50	2004/2005 season (100%)	0	50	0	0	0
113	CAN	Maggy Pellerin / Dominique Dupuis	50	2003/2004 season (100%)	0	0	0	0	0
113	CAN	Maggy Pellerin / Dominique Dupuis	50	2002/2003 season (70%)	0	0	0	0	0
113	CAN	Amy Saucke-Lacelle / Jamie Britton	50	2004/2005 season (100%)	0	50	0	0	0
113	CAN	Amy Saucke-Lacelle / Jamie Britton	50	2003/2004 season (100%)	0	0	0	0	0
113	CAN	Amy Saucke-Lacelle / Jamie Britton	50	2002/2003 season (70%)	0	0	0	0	0
113	CZE	Barbora Silna / Martin Subrt	50	2004/2005 season (100%)	0	0	0	0	0
113	CZE	Barbora Silna / Martin Subrt	50	2003/2004 season (100%)	0	50	0	0	0
113	CZE	Barbora Silna / Martin Subrt	50	2002/2003 season (70%)	0	0	0	0	0
118	USA	Samantha Cepican / Phillip Lichtor	25	2004/2005 season (100%)	0	0	0	0	0
118	USA	Samantha Cepican / Phillip Lichtor	25	2003/2004 season (100%)	0	25	0	0	0
118	USA	Samantha Cepican / Phillip Lichtor	25	2002/2003 season (70%)	0	0	0	0	0
118	UKR	Nadezhda Frolenkova / Mikhail Kasalo	25	2004/2005 season (100%)	0	0	0	0	0
118	UKR	Nadezhda Frolenkova / Mikhail Kasalo	25	2003/2004 season (100%)	0	25	0	0	0
118	UKR	Nadezhda Frolenkova / Mikhail Kasalo	25	2002/2003 season (70%)	0	0	0	0	0
118	HUN	Olivia Lalatka / Gabor Balint	25	2004/2005 season (100%)	0	25	0	0	0
118	HUN	Olivia Lalatka / Gabor Balint	25	2003/2004 season (100%)	0	0	0	0	0
118	HUN	Olivia Lalatka / Gabor Balint	25	2002/2003 season (70%)	0	0	0	0	0
118	CRO	Andrea Major / Dejan Illes	25	2004/2005 season (100%)	0	0	0	0	0
118	CRO	Andrea Major / Dejan Illes	25	2003/2004 season (100%)	25	0	0	0	0
118	CRO	Andrea Major / Dejan Illes	25	2002/2003 season (70%)	0	0	0	0	0
118	AUS	Danielle O'Brien / Gregory Merriman	25	2004/2005 season (100%)	0	25	0	0	0
118	AUS	Danielle O'Brien / Gregory Merriman	25	2003/2004 season (100%)	0	0	0	0	0
118	AUS	Danielle O'Brien / Gregory Merriman	25	2002/2003 season (70%)	0	0	0	0	0
118	ITA	Isabella Pajardi / Stefano Caruso	25	2004/2005 season (100%)	0	0	0	0	0
118	ITA	Isabella Pajardi / Stefano Caruso	25	2003/2004 season (100%)	0	25	0	0	0
118	ITA	Isabella Pajardi / Stefano Caruso	25	2002/2003 season (70%)	0	0	0	0	0
118	GBR	Nicola Trippick / Damon Latimer	25	2004/2005 season (100%)	0	0	0	0	0
118	GBR	Nicola Trippick / Damon Latimer	25	2003/2004 season (100%)	0	25	0	0	0
118	GBR	Nicola Trippick / Damon Latimer	25	2002/2003 season (70%)	0	0	0	0	0
125	PRK	Pun Hui Ri / Song Min Ri	18	2004/2005 season (100%)	0	0	0	0	0
125	PRK	Pun Hui Ri / Song Min Ri	18	2003/2004 season (100%)	0	0	0	0	0
125	PRK	Pun Hui Ri / Song Min Ri	18	2002/2003 season (70%)	0	18	0	0	0

== See also ==
- ISU World Standings
- 2004–05 figure skating season
