= ISU Junior Grand Prix in Hungary =

International figure skating competition

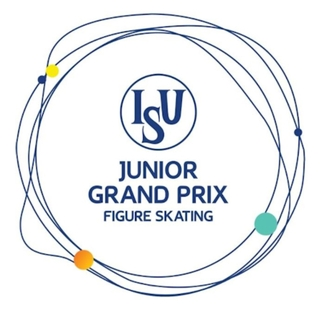
- Status: Inactive
- Genre: ISU Junior Grand Prix
- Frequency: Occasional
- Country: Hungary
- Inaugurated: 1997
- Most recent: 2023
- Organizer: Hungarian Skating Federation

The ISU Junior Grand Prix in Hungary is an international figure skating competition sanctioned by the International Skating Union (ISU), organized and hosted by the Hungarian Skating Federation (Hungarian: Magyar Országos Korcsolyázó Szövetség). It is held periodically as an event of the ISU Junior Grand Prix of Figure Skating (JGP), a series of international competitions exclusively for junior-level skaters. Medals may be awarded in men's singles, women's singles, pair skating, and ice dance. Skaters earn points based on their results at the qualifying competitions each season, and the top skaters or teams in each discipline are invited to then compete at the Junior Grand Prix of Figure Skating Final.

== History ==
The ISU Junior Grand Prix of Figure Skating (JGP) was established by the International Skating Union (ISU) in 1997 and consists of a series of seven international figure skating competitions exclusively for junior-level skaters. The locations of the Junior Grand Prix events change every year. While all seven competitions feature the men's, women's, and ice dance events, only four competitions each season feature the pairs event. Skaters earn points based on their results each season, and the top skaters or teams in each discipline are then invited to compete at the Junior Grand Prix of Figure Skating Final.

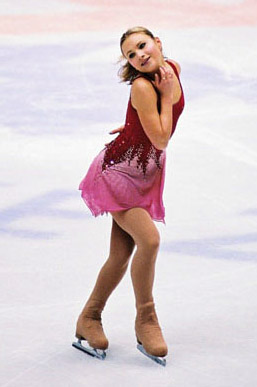
Julia Soldatova of Russia, the women's champion at the inaugural Hungarian Cup

Skaters are eligible to compete on the junior-level circuit if they are at least 13 years old before 1 July of the respective season, but not yet 19 (for single skaters), 21 (for men and women in ice dance and women in pair skating), or 23 (for men in pair skating). Competitors are chosen by their respective skating federations. The number of entries allotted to each ISU member nation in each discipline is determined by their results at the prior World Junior Figure Skating Championships.

Hungary hosted its first Junior Grand Prix competition – then called the Hungarian Cup – in Székesfehérvár during the inaugural JGP season in 1997. Vitaliy Danylchenko of Ukraine won the men's event, Julia Soldatova of Russia won the women's event, Alena Maltseva and Oleg Popov of Russia won the pairs event, and Jessica Joseph and Charles Butler of the United States won the ice dance event.

The International Skating Union officially cancelled all scheduled Junior Grand Prix events for the 2020–21 season, which included the 2020 competition in Budapest, due to the COVID-19 pandemic, citing increased travel and entry requirements between countries and potentially excessive sanitary and health care costs for those hosting competitions. The most recent iteration of this competition took place in 2023.

== Medalists ==
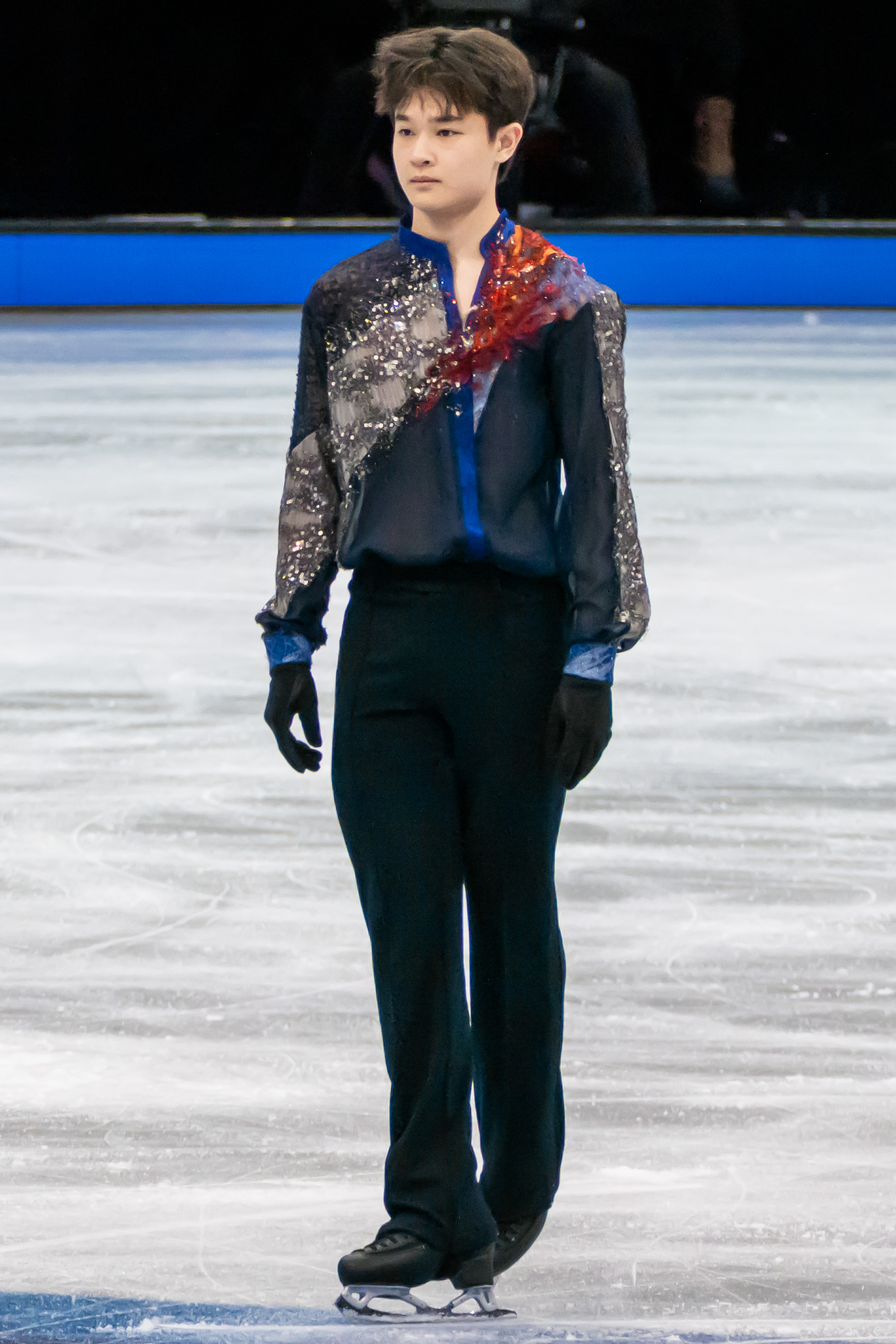
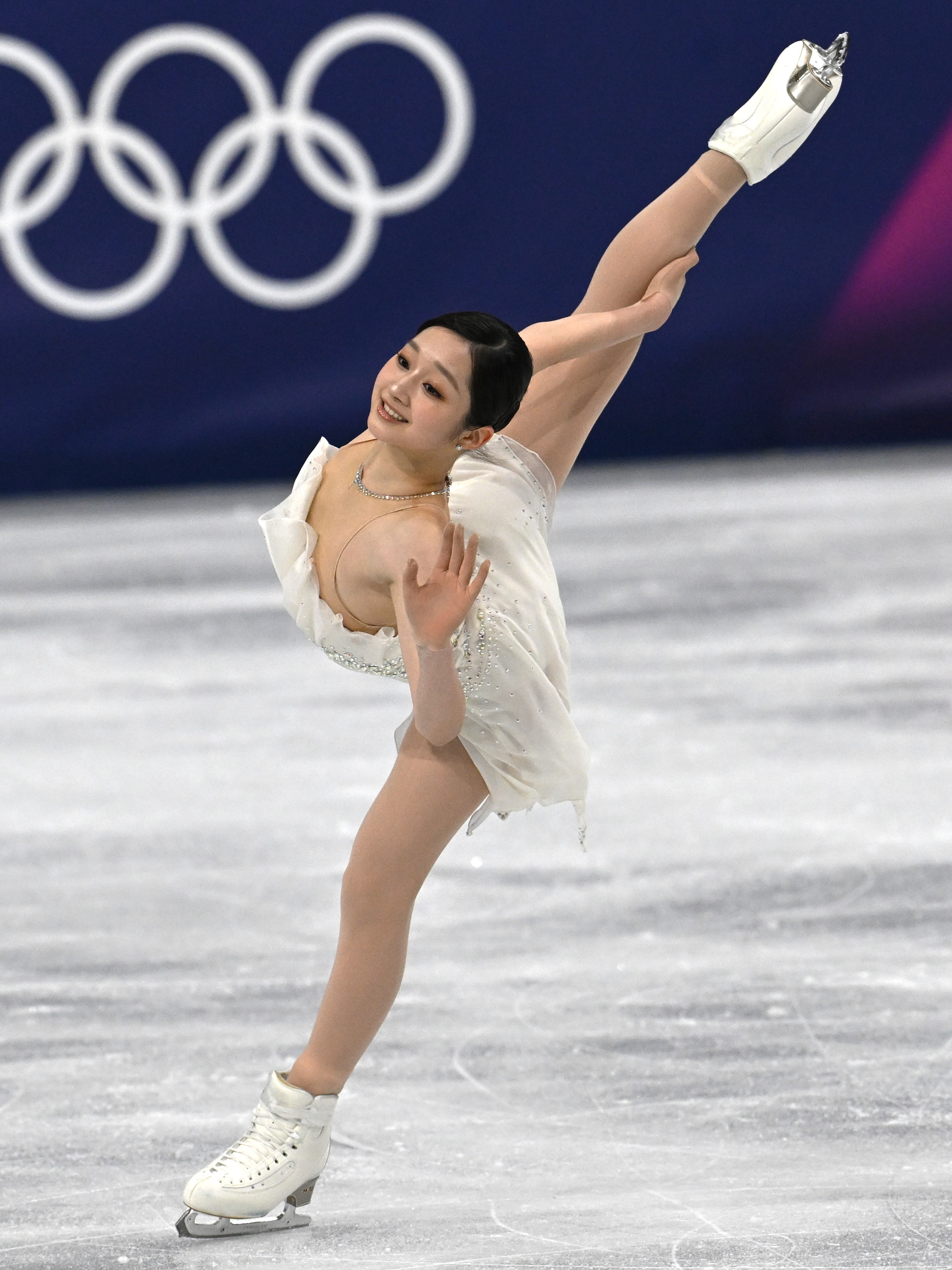
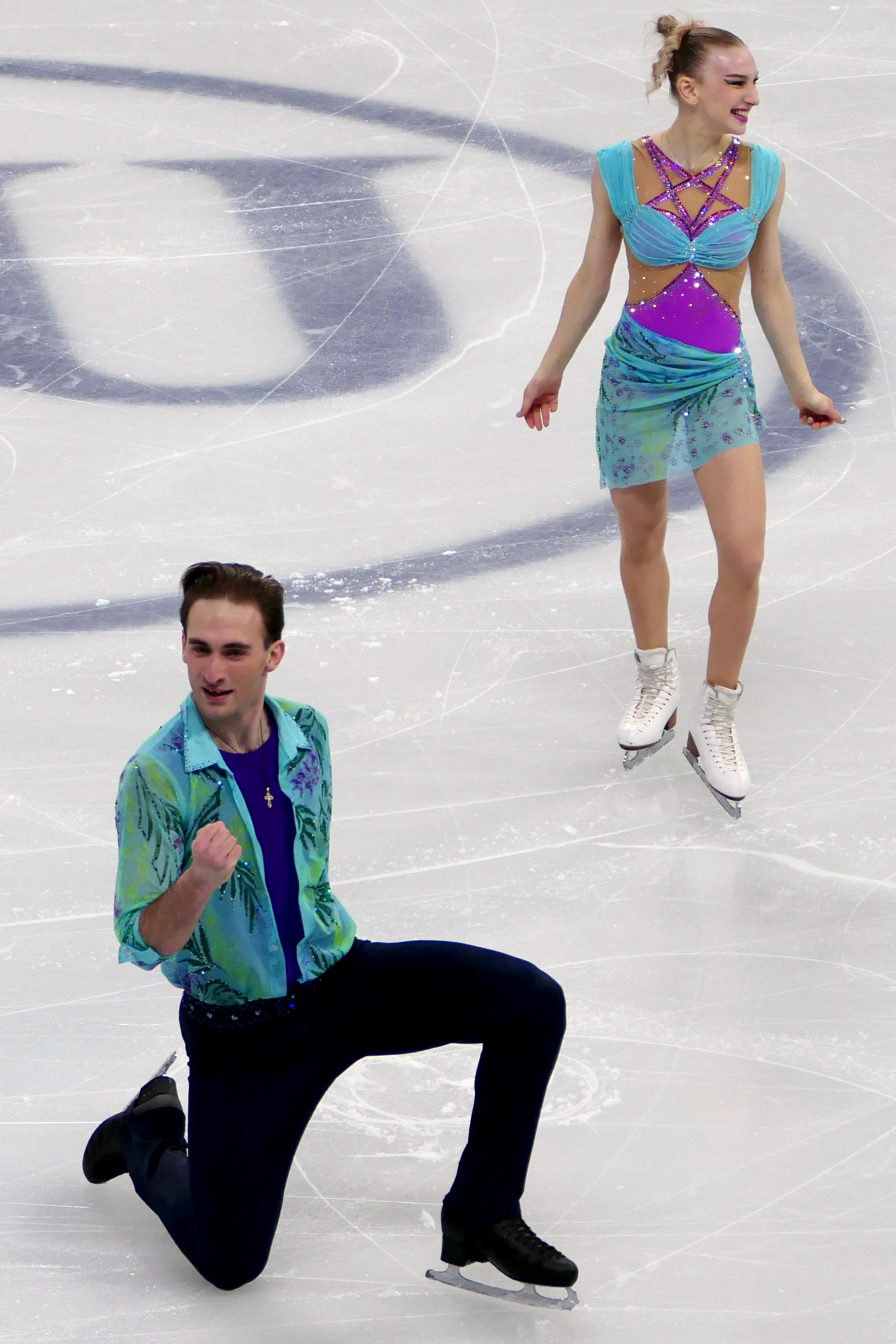
The 2023 Junior Grand Prix in Hungary champions: Kim Hyun-gyeom of South Korea (men's singles); Shin Ji-a of South Korea (women's singles); and Anastasiia Metelkina and Luka Berulava of Georgia (pair skating)
Not pictured: Iryna Pidgaina and Artem Koval of Ukraine (ice dance)

=== Men's singles ===
Men's event medalists
Year	Location	Gold	Silver	Bronze	Ref.
1997	Székesfehérvár	(Ukraine) Vitaliy Danylchenko	(Bulgaria) Hristo Turlakov	(France) Vincent Restencourt	
1998	Budapest	(Russia) Ilia Klimkin	(Japan) Yōsuke Takeuchi	(United States) Ryan Bradley	
2004	Budapest	(Russia) Alexander Uspenski	(Japan) Yasuharu Nanri	(Russia) Sergei Voronov	
2006	Budapest	(United States) Stephen Carriere	(Japan) Takahito Mura	(United States) Eliot Halverson	
2009	Budapest	(United States) Richard Dornbush	(United States) Grant Hochstein	(Russia) Zhan Bush	
2020	Budapest	Competition cancelled due to the COVID-19 pandemic			
2023	Budapest	(South Korea) Kim Hyun-gyeom	(Switzerland) Naoki Rossi	(Japan) Haru Kakiuchi	

=== Women's singles ===
Women's event medalists
Year	Location	Gold	Silver	Bronze	Ref.
1997	Székesfehérvár	(Russia) Julia Soldatova	(Hungary) Júlia Sebestyén	(Germany) Annette Dytrt	
1998	Budapest	(Hungary) Júlia Sebestyén	(United States) Sarah Hughes	(Japan) Chisato Shiina	
2004	Budapest	(South Korea) Yuna Kim	(Japan) Aki Sawada	(United States) Katy Taylor	
2006	Budapest	(United States) Juliana Cannarozzo	(Japan) Rumi Suizu	(South Korea) Choi Ji-eun	
2009	Budapest	(Russia) Polina Shelepen	(United States) Angela Maxwell	(Japan) Haruka Imai	
2020	Budapest	Competition cancelled due to the COVID-19 pandemic			
2023	Budapest	(South Korea) Shin Ji-a	(South Korea) Kim Yu-seong	(Japan) Ayumi Shibayama	

=== Pairs ===
Pairs event medalists
Year	Location	Gold	Silver	Bronze	Ref.
1997	Székesfehérvár	(Russia); Alena Maltseva; Oleg Popov	(United States); Megan Sierk; Dustin Sierk	(Russia); Victoria Maksyuta; Vladislav Zhovnirski	
1998	Budapest	(Russia); Elena Bogospasaeva; Oleg Ponomarenko	(Russia); Svetlana Nikolaeva; Alexei Sokolov	(Germany); Stefanie Weiss; Matthias Bleyer	
2004	Budapest	(United States); Sydney Schmidt; Christopher Pottenger	(United States); Lindsey Seitz; Andy Seitz	(Ukraine); Alina Dikhtiar; Filip Zalevski	
2006	Budapest	(United States); Keauna McLaughlin; Rockne Brubaker	(United States); Kaela Pflumm; Christopher Pottenger	(Canada); Emilie Demers Boutin; Pierre-Philippe Joncas	
2009	Budapest	No pairs competition			
2020	Budapest	Competition cancelled due to the COVID-19 pandemic			
2023	Budapest	(Georgia (country)); Anastasiia Metelkina; Luka Berulava	(Ukraine); Violetta Sierova; Ivan Khobta	(Canada); Martina Ariano Kent; Charly Laliberté Laurent	

=== Ice dance ===
Ice dance event medalists
Year	Location	Gold	Silver	Bronze	Ref.
1997	Székesfehérvár	(United States); Jessica Joseph; Charles Butler	(Hungary); Zita Gebora; András Visontai	(Russia); Oksana Potdykova; Denis Petukhov	
1998	Budapest	(Russia); Julia Golovina; Denis Egorov	(Hungary); Zita Gebora; András Visontai	(United States); Emilie Nussear; Brandon Forsyth	
2004	Budapest	(Italy); Anna Cappellini; Matteo Zanni	(Canada); Allie Hann-McCurdy; Michael Coreno	(United States); Trina Pratt; Todd Gilles	
2006	Budapest	(Russia); Ekaterina Bobrova; Dmitri Soloviev	(Canada); Joanna Lenko; Mitchell Islam	(Russia); Julia Zlobina; Alexei Sitnikov	
2009	Budapest	(Russia); Elena Ilinykh; Nikita Katsalapov	(Canada); Karen Routhier; Eric Saucke-Lacelle	(Italy); Lorenza Alessandrini; Simone Vaturi	
2020	Budapest	Competition cancelled due to the COVID-19 pandemic			
2023	Budapest	(Ukraine); Iryna Pidgaina; Artem Koval	(United States); Yahli Pedersen; Jeffrey Chen	(France); Dania Mouaden; Théo Bigot	
