= 2004–05 ISU Junior Grand Prix =

- Type: ISU Junior Grand Prix
- Season: 2004–05
- Previous: 2003–04 ISU Junior Grand Prix
- Next: 2005–06 ISU Junior Grand Prix

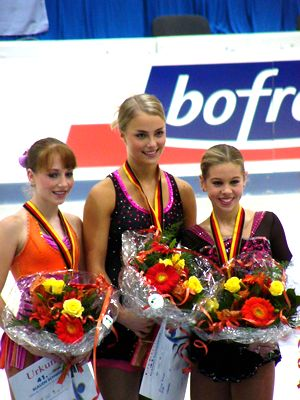
The ladies podium at the event in Germany

The 2004–05 ISU Junior Grand Prix was the eighth season of the ISU Junior Grand Prix, a series of international junior level competitions organized by the International Skating Union. It was the junior-level complement to the Grand Prix of Figure Skating, which was for senior-level skaters. Skaters competed in the disciplines of men's singles, ladies' singles, pair skating, and ice dance. The top skaters from the series met at the Junior Grand Prix Final.

== Competitions ==
The locations of the JGP events change yearly. In the 2004–05 season, the series was composed of the following events:

Date	Event	Location
August 26–28	2004 JGP Courchevel	Courchevel, France
September 1–5	2004 JGP Budapest	Budapest, Hungary
September 9–12	2004 JGP Skate Long Beach	Long Beach, United States
September 16–19	2004 JGP Harbin	Harbin, China
September 22–25	2004 JGP Belgrade Sparrow	Belgrade, Serbia and Montenegro
Sept. 29 – Oct. 3	2004 JGP Ukrainian Souvenir	Kyiv, Ukraine
October 7–9	2004 JGP Pokal der Blauen Schwerter	Chemnitz, Germany
October 12–15	2004 JGP Harghita Cup	Miercurea-Ciuc, Romania
December 2–5	2004–05 Junior Grand Prix Final	Helsinki, Finland

== Junior Grand Prix Final qualifiers ==
The following skaters qualified for the 2004–05 Junior Grand Prix Final, in order of qualification.

	Men	Ladies	Pairs	Ice dance
1	(Japan) Yasuharu Nanri	(Japan) Mao Asada	(Russia) Maria Mukhortova / Maxim Trankov	(Italy) Anna Cappellini / Matteo Zanni
2	(Russia) Alexander Uspenski	(South Korea) Kim Yuna	(Russia) Arina Ushakova / Alexander Popov	(United States) Morgan Matthews / Maxim Zavozin
3	(United States) Dennis Phan	(Japan) Nana Takeda	(United States) Mariel Miller / Rockne Brubaker	(Russia) Anastasia Platonova / Andrei Maximishin
4	(Canada) Christopher Mabee	(United States) Kimmie Meissner	(Canada) Jessica Dubé / Bryce Davison	(Canada) Tessa Virtue / Scott Moir
5	(Switzerland) Jamal Othman	(Japan) Akiko Kitamura	(United States) Julia Vlassov / Drew Meekins	(Russia) Natalia Mikhailova / Arkadi Sergeev
6	(Russia) Mikhail Magerovski	(Japan) Aki Sawada	(United States) Aaryn Smith / Will Chitwood	(Israel) Alexandra Zaretsky / Roman Zaretsky
7	(Japan) Ryo Shibata	(United States) Danielle Kahle	(Russia) Tatiana Kokoreva / Egor Golovkin	(Russia) Anastasia Gorshkova / Ilia Tkachenko
8	(Russia) Sergei Dobrin	(Canada) Meagan Duhamel	(United States) Sydney Schmidt / Christopher Pottenger	(Canada) Allie McCurdy / Michael Coreno
Alternates
1st	(France) Yannick Ponsero	(United States) Jane Bugaeva	(United States) Brittany Vise / Nicholas Kole	(Czech Republic) Petra Pachlova / Petr Knoth
2nd	(Russia) Andrei Lutai	(United States) Katy Taylor	(United States) Lindsey Seitz / Andy Seitz	(United States) Meryl Davis / Charlie White
3rd	(United States) Princeton Kwong	(United States) Jessica Houston	(Sweden) Angelika Pylkina / Niklas Hogner	(United States) Trina Pratt / Todd Gilles

Kiira Korpi, who missed the third alternate position by one spot, was given the host wildcard spot to the Junior Grand Prix Final. She placed 4th at the Final.

== Medalists ==
=== Men ===
Competition	Gold	Silver	Bronze	Details
France	(France) Yannick Ponsero	(Russia) Andrei Lutai	(France) Jérémie Colot	
Hungary	(Russia) Alexander Uspenski	(Japan) Yasuharu Nanri	(Russia) Sergei Voronov	
United States	(United States) Dennis Phan	(Canada) Christopher Mabee	(United States) Princeton Kwong	
China	(Russia) Mikhail Magerovski	(Switzerland) Jamal Othman	(Japan) Kazumi Kishimoto	
Serbia	(Canada) Christopher Mabee	(United States) Shaun Rogers	(Russia) Sergei Dobrin	
Ukraine	(Japan) Yasuharu Nanri	(United States) Dennis Phan	(Japan) Nobunari Oda	
Germany	(Switzerland) Jamal Othman	(Russia) Alexander Uspenski	(United States) Princeton Kwong	
Romania	(Japan) Ryo Shibata	(Russia) Sergei Dobrin	(Russia) Mikhail Magerovski	
Final	(United States) Dennis Phan	(Japan) Yasuharu Nanri	(Russia) Alexander Uspenski	

=== Ladies ===
Competition	Gold	Silver	Bronze	Details
France	(Canada) Meagan Duhamel	(United States) Kimmie Meissner	(United States) Jessica Houston	
Hungary	(South Korea) Kim Yuna	(Japan) Aki Sawada	(United States) Katy Taylor	
United States	(Japan) Mao Asada	(United States) Kimmie Meissner	(United States) Danielle Kahle	
China	(Japan) Nana Takeda	(South Korea) Kim Yuna	(Canada) Jessica Dubé	
Serbia	(Finland) Laura Lepistö	(United States) Jane Bugaeva	(Canada) Signe Ronka	
Ukraine	(Japan) Mao Asada	(Russia) Veronika Kropotina	(Japan) Aki Sawada	
Germany	(Finland) Kiira Korpi	(United States) Danielle Kahle	(United States) Katy Taylor	
Romania	(Japan) Akiko Kitamura	(Japan) Nana Takeda	(United States) Jessica Houston	
Final	(Japan) Mao Asada	(South Korea) Kim Yuna	(United States) Kimmie Meissner	

=== Pairs ===
Competition	Gold	Silver	Bronze	Details
France	(United States) Mariel Miller / Rockne Brubaker	(Russia) Arina Ushakova / Alexander Popov	(United States) Brooke Castile / Benjamin Okolski	
Hungary	(United States) Sydney Schmidt / Christopher Pottenger	(United States) Lindsey Seitz / Andy Seitz	(Ukraine) Alina Dikhtiar / Fillip Zalevski	
United States	(Canada) Jessica Dubé / Bryce Davison	(United States) Aaryn Smith / Will Chitwood	(Canada) Michelle Cronin / Brian Shales	
China	(Russia) Maria Mukhortova / Maxim Trankov	(Canada) Jessica Dubé / Bryce Davison	(Russia) Elena Efaieva / Alexei Menshikov	
Serbia	(United States) Julia Vlassov / Drew Meekins	(United States) Aaryn Smith / Will Chitwood	(Sweden) Angelika Pylkina / Niklas Hogner	
Ukraine	(Russia) Arina Ushakova / Alexander Popov	(United States) Katelyn Uhlig / Colin Loomis	(United States) Julia Vlassov / Drew Meekins	
Germany	(Russia) Maria Mukhortova / Maxim Trankov	(United States) Brittany Vise / Nicholas Kole	(Sweden) Angelika Pylkina / Niklas Hogner	
Romania	(Russia) Tatiana Kokoreva / Egor Golovkin	(United States) Mariel Miller / Rockne Brubaker	(Russia) Elena Efaieva / Alexei Menshikov	
Final	(Russia) Maria Mukhortova / Maxim Trankov	(United States) Brittany Vise / Nicholas Kole	(United States) Mariel Miller / Rockne Brubaker	

=== Ice dance ===
Competition	Gold	Silver	Bronze	Details
France	(United States) Morgan Matthews / Maxim Zavozin	(Canada) Tessa Virtue / Scott Moir	(France) Pernelle Carron / Edouard Dezutter	
Hungary	(Italy) Anna Cappellini / Matteo Zanni	(Canada) Allie McCurdy / Michael Coreno	(United States) Trina Pratt / Todd Gilles	
United States	(United States) Morgan Matthews / Maxim Zavozin	(Canada) Siobhan Karam / Joshua McGrath	(Russia) Anastasia Gorshkova / Ilia Tkachenko	
China	(Canada) Tessa Virtue / Scott Moir	(Russia) Natalia Mikhailova / Arkadi Sergeev	(United States) Trina Pratt / Todd Gilles	
Serbia	(Italy) Anna Cappellini / Matteo Zanni	(Russia) Anastasia Gorshkova / Ilia Tkachenko	(United States) Meryl Davis / Charlie White	
Ukraine	(Russia) Anastasia Platonova / Andrei Maximishin	(Czech Republic) Petra Pachlová / Petr Knoth	(Canada) Allie McCurdy / Michael Coreno	
Germany	(Russia) Natalia Mikhailova / Arkadi Sergeev	(Italy) Camilla Pistorello / Luca Lanotte	(Israel) Alexandra Zaretsky / Roman Zaretsky	
Romania	(Russia) Anastasia Platonova / Andrei Maximishin	(Israel) Alexandra Zaretsky / Roman Zaretsky	(United States) Meryl Davis / Charlie White	
Final	(United States) Morgan Matthews / Maxim Zavozin	(Canada) Tessa Virtue / Scott Moir	(Italy) Anna Cappellini / Matteo Zanni	

== Medal table ==
Rank	Nation	Gold	Silver	Bronze	Total
1	Russia (RUS)	10	7	7	24
2	United States (USA)	8	13	15	36
3	Japan (JPN)	7	4	3	14
4	Canada (CAN)	4	6	4	14
5	Italy (ITA)	2	1	1	4
6	Finland (FIN)	2	0	0	2
7	South Korea (KOR)	1	2	0	3
8	Switzerland (SUI)	1	1	0	2
9	France (FRA)	1	0	2	3
10	Israel (ISR)	0	1	1	2
11	Czech Republic (CZE)	0	1	0	1
12	Sweden (SWE)	0	0	2	2
13	Ukraine (UKR)	0	0	1	1
Totals (13 entries)		36	36	36	108
