= Viktor Kudryavtsev =

Viktor Kudryavtsev may refer to:

- Viktor Kudriavtsev, figure skating coach and choreographer
- Viktor Kudryavtsev (guitarist), guitarist for the band Zemlyane
