= Magerovski =

Magerovski is a surname. Notable people with the surname include:

- Mikhail Magerovski (born 1986), Russian figure skater
