= Mikhail Magerovski =

Russian figure skater

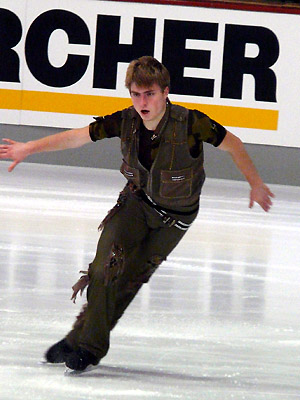
- Magerovski in 2007.

Personal information
- Native name: Михаил Александрович Магеровский
- Full name: Mikhail Alexandrovich Magerovski
- Born: 7 April 1986 (age 40)
- Height: 1.75 m (5 ft 9 in)

Figure skating career
- Country: Russia
- Coach: Viktor Kudriavtsev, Olga Markova, Marina Kudriavtseva
- Skating club: Moskvich
- Began skating: 1991
- Retired: c. 2008

Mikhail Alexandrovich Magerovski (Russian: Михаил Александрович Магеровский; born 7 April 1986 in Moscow) is a Russian former competitive figure skater. He won silver at the 2005 Skate Israel and two gold medals on the ISU Junior Grand Prix series. He also qualified to compete at two Junior Grand Prix Finals. He was coached by Viktor Kudriavtsev in Moscow. He is the younger brother of Sergei Magerovski, an ice dancer who represented the United States.

== Programs ==
Season	Short program	Free skating
2004–05	Black Eyes	Sonata by Sergei Rachmaninoff

== Competitive highlights ==
JGP: Junior Grand Prix

International
Event	02–03	04–05	05–06	06–07	07–08
Crystal Skate			4th		
Nebelhorn Trophy					8th
Skate Israel			2nd		
International: Junior
JGP Final	8th	6th			
JGP China	1st	1st			
JGP Romania		3rd			
JGP Slovakia	5th				
National
Russian Champ.		14th	5th	12th	
