= Fabian Keller =

Swiss former competitive ice dancer (born 1982)

Personal information
- Born: 1 September 1982 (age 44) Schachen-Reute, Switzerland
- Height: 1.66 m (5 ft 5 1/2 in)

Figure skating career
- Country: Switzerland
- Partner: Daniela Keller
- Coach: Cornelia Grisinger, Martin Skotnicky, Alexei Pospelov, Hanspeter Müller
- Skating club: Eislaufverein Mittelrheintal
- Began skating: 1990
- Retired: 2005

Medal record
Swiss Championships
Gold medal – first place	2005 Lausanne	Ice dance

Fabian Keller (born 1 September 1982 in Schachen-Reute) is a Swiss former competitive ice dancer. With his sister, Daniela Keller, he is the 2005 Swiss national champion and a five-time junior national champion. They skated in the final segment at five ISU Championships – four World Junior Championships (2001–2004) and the 2005 European Championships in Turin, Italy. They competed in the original dance at the 2005 World Championships in Moscow, Russia.

== Programs ==
(with Daniela Keller)

Season	Original dance	Free dance
2004–2005	Charleston; Foxtrot; Quickstep	Bolero (from Moulin Rouge!)
2003–2004	Blues: Minnie the Moocher (from The Blues Brothers); Jive: Do You Love Me by The Blues Brothers	La Bomba; Casi un Bolero; Amor; Por Arriba, Por Abajo by Ricky Martin
2002–2003	Waltz; Polka: Tritsch-Tratsch-Polka by Johann Strauss II	Quidam (from Cirque du Soleil) by Benoît Jutras
2001–2002	Tango: Taquito Milltar by Mariano Mores; Flamenco: Esperanza by Maxime Rodriguez	Grease by Jim Jacobs, Warren Casey
2000–2001	The Muppet Show by Jim Henson, Sam Pottle; The Addams Family by Marc Shaiman; The Muppet Show by Jim Henson, Sam Pottle	Cats by Andrew Lloyd Webber

== Competitive highlights ==
(with Daniela Keller)

International
Event	99–00	00–01	01–02	02–03	03–04	04–05
World Champ.						29th
European Champ.						20th
Golden Spin						6th
International: Junior
World Junior Champ.	25th	24th	24th	21st	20th	
JGP Canada				10th		
JGP Czech Republic		14th				
JGP Italy			14th			
JGP Netherlands			13th			
JGP Norway		14th				
JGP Poland					10th	
JGP Serbia				9th		
JGP Slovenia					12th	
EYOF				11th		
National
Swiss Championships	1st J	1st J	1st J	1st J	1st J	1st
J = Junior level
