= Daniela Keller =

Swiss former competitive ice dancer (born 1985)

Personal information
- Born: 16 April 1985 (age 41) Schachen-Reute, Switzerland
- Height: 1.60 m (5 ft 3 in)

Figure skating career
- Country: Switzerland
- Discipline: Ice dance
- Partner: Fabian Keller
- Coach: Cornelia Grisinger, Martin Skotnicky, Alexei Pospelov, Hanspeter Müller
- Skating club: Eislaufverein Mittelrheintal
- Began skating: 1990
- Retired: 2005

Medal record
Swiss Championships
| Gold medal – first place | 2005 Lausanne | Ice dance |

Daniela Keller (born 16 April 1985 in Schachen-Reute) is a Swiss former competitive ice dancer. With her brother, Fabian Keller, she is the 2005 Swiss national champion and a five-time junior national champion. They skated in the final segment at five ISU Championships – four World Junior Championships (2001–2004) and the 2005 European Championships in Turin, Italy. They competed in the original dance at the 2005 World Championships in Moscow, Russia.

== Programs ==
(with Fabian Keller)

| Season | Original dance | Free dance |
|---|---|---|
| 2004–2005 | Charleston; Foxtrot; Quickstep | Bolero (from Moulin Rouge!) |
| 2003–2004 | Blues: Minnie the Moocher (from The Blues Brothers); Jive: Do You Love Me by The Blues Brothers | La Bomba; Casi un Bolero; Amor; Por Arriba, Por Abajo by Ricky Martin |
| 2002–2003 | Waltz; Polka: Tritsch-Tratsch-Polka by Johann Strauss II | Quidam (from Cirque du Soleil) by Benoît Jutras |
| 2001–2002 | Tango: Taquito Milltar by Mariano Mores; Flamenco: Esperanza by Maxime Rodriguez | Grease by Jim Jacobs, Warren Casey |
| 2000–2001 | The Muppet Show by Jim Henson, Sam Pottle; The Addams Family by Marc Shaiman; The Muppet Show by Jim Henson, Sam Pottle | Cats by Andrew Lloyd Webber |

== Competitive highlights ==
(with Fabian Keller)

International
| Event | 99–00 | 00–01 | 01–02 | 02–03 | 03–04 | 04–05 |
|---|---|---|---|---|---|---|
| World Champ. | | | | | | 29th |
| European Champ. | | | | | | 20th |
| Golden Spin | | | | | | 6th |
International: Junior
| World Junior Champ. | 25th | 24th | 24th | 21st | 20th | |
| JGP Canada | | | | 10th | | |
| JGP Czech Republic | | 14th | | | | |
| JGP Italy | | | 14th | | | |
| JGP Netherlands | | | 13th | | | |
| JGP Norway | | 14th | | | | |
| JGP Poland | | | | | 10th | |
| JGP Serbia | | | | 9th | | |
| JGP Slovenia | | | | | 12th | |
| EYOF | | | | 11th | | |
National
| Swiss Championships | 1st J | 1st J | 1st J | 1st J | 1st J | 1st |
J = Junior level
