= Alexander Uspenski =

Russian former competitive figure skater

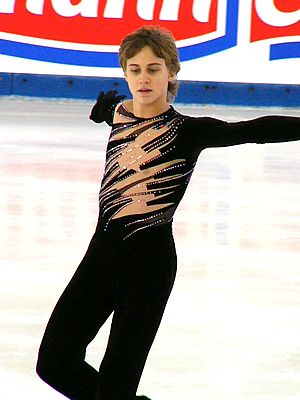
- Alexander Uspenski competes at the 2004 Junior Grand Prix in Germany

Personal information
- Full name: Alexander Sergeyevich Uspenski
- Born: 25 April 1987 (age 39) Moscow, Russian SFSR, Soviet Union
- Height: 1.76 m (5 ft 9 in)

Figure skating career
- Country: Russia
- Skating club: SC Moskvich
- Began skating: 1992
- Retired: 2010
Medal record
Representing Russia
Figure skating: Men's singles
Junior Grand Prix Final
Bronze medal – third place	2004–05 Helsinki	Men's singles

Alexander Sergeyevich Uspenski (Russian: Александр Серге́евич Успенский; born 25 April 1987) is a Russian former competitive figure skater. He is the 2006 Finlandia Trophy silver medalist and 2004 ISU Junior Grand Prix Final bronze medalist.

== Personal life ==
Alexander Uspenski was born on 25 April 1987 in Moscow. He is the elder brother of Vladimir Uspenski, who also competed in figure skating.

== Career ==
Alexander Uspenski began competing on the ISU Junior Grand Prix (JGP) circuit in 2001. Over the course of five seasons, he would win seven medals – three gold, two silver, and two bronze – and qualify three times for the ISU Junior Grand Prix Final. He won the bronze medal at the 2004 JGP Final.

Uspenski withdrew from the 2005 World Junior Championships due to the flu. He was sent again the following year and finished 8th.

Uspenski made his senior international circuit debut in the 2006–07 season. After taking the silver medal at the 2006 Finlandia Trophy, he debuted on the senior Grand Prix series, finishing 5th and 6th at his two events. Uspenski missed the Russian national championships as a result of whooping cough. He changed coaches from Natalia Dubinskaia to Marina Kudriavtseva in January 2007.

Uspenski competed on the GP series for two more seasons before retiring in 2010.

== Programs ==
Season	Short program	Free skating	Exhibition
2009–10	Sarabande (modern arrangement)	The Nutcracker by Pyotr Ilyich Tchaikovsky	
2008–09	Lettre A Ma Mere by Paul de Senneville performed by Richard Clayderman	Prelude in C sharp minor; Vocalise; Prelude Op. 23 No. 5 by Sergei Rachmaninoff	
2007–08	Don Quixote by Ludwig Minkus	Turandot by Giacomo Puccini	
2006–07	Sarabande by George Frideric Handel (from Barry Lyndon)	The Godfather by Nino Rota	Danse Macabre by Camille Saint-Saëns
2005–06	Danse Macabre by Camille Saint-Saëns	The Bird by Kitarō	
2004–05	The Poet	The Phantom of the Opera on Ice by Robert Danova	
2003–04	Tango	The Phantom of the Opera on Ice by Robert Danova	

== Competitive highlights ==
GP: Grand Prix; JGP: Junior Grand Prix

International
Event	00–01	01–02	02–03	03–04	04–05	05–06	06–07	07–08	08–09	09–10
GP Cup of China							6th	5th		
GP Cup of Russia								7th	10th	
GP NHK Trophy							5th			
GP Skate America									6th	
Ice Challenge										9th
Finlandia							2nd			
Nebelhorn								7th		
International: Junior
Junior Worlds					WD	8th				
JGP Final				7th	3rd	4th				
JGP Bulgaria		5th								
JGP China			6th							
JGP Czech Rep.				3rd						
JGP Germany					2nd					
JGP Hungary					1st					
JGP Poland		3rd		2nd		1st				
JGP Serbia			5th							
JGP Slovakia						1st				
National
Russian Champ.			16th	7th	4th	4th	WD	5th		15th
Russian Junior	12th	10th	10th	4th	1st	1st				
Russian Cup Final			2nd							
WD: Withdrew
