= Camilla Pistorello =

Italian former ice dancer (born 1987)

Personal information
- Born: 1 July 1987 (age 39) Milan, Italy
- Height: 1.65 m (5 ft 5 in)

Figure skating career
- Country: Italy
- Retired: 2007

Camilla Pistorello (born 1 July 1987) is an Italian actress and former ice dancer. She competed twice at the World Junior Championships, once each with Luca Lanotte and Matteo Zanni.

== Programs ==
=== With Zanni ===
Season	Original dance	Free dance
2006–2007	La cumparsita; Oblivion by Astor Piazzolla; El Choclo	Prayer in the Night; Sarabande in D minor by George Frideric Handel; Sarabande (modern arrangement) by Maksim Mrvica

=== With Lanotte ===
Season	Original dance	Free dance
2004–2005	Dancin' Fool; More; Jumpin' Jack	The Four Seasons by Antonio Vivaldi performed by Vanessa-Mae; Adagio in G minor by Remo Giazotto, Tomaso Albinoni; The Four Seasons by Antonio Vivaldi performed by Vanessa-Mae

=== With Caspani ===
Season	Original dance	Free dance
2001–2002	El gato montés by Hugo Strasser and his Orchestra; Have You Ever Really Loved a Woman? (from Don Juan DeMarco) by Bryan Adams; El gato montés by Hugo Strasser and his Orchestra	Jive and Jive by Hugo Strasser and his Orchestra; Only You by American Swing Orchestra; The Mask by Jose Norman

== Competitive highlights ==
=== With Zanni ===
International
Event	2006–07
World Junior Championships	8th
JGP Hungary	5th
JGP Norway	4th
National
Italian Championships	1st J.
JGP = Junior Grand Prix; J. = Junior level

=== With Lanotte ===
International
Event	2004–05
World Junior Championships	9th
JGP Germany	2nd
JGP Romania	5th
National
Italian Championships	2nd J.
J. = Junior level; JGP = Junior Grand Prix

=== With Caspani ===
International
Event	2001–02
JGP Bulgaria	11th
JGP Netherlands	12th
JGP = Junior Grand Prix
