= Marina Kudriavtseva =

Soviet figure skater (born 1952)

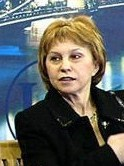
- Kudriavtseva in 2004

Personal information
- Full name: Marina Grigorevna Kudriavtseva (married)
- Other names: Marina Grigorevna Titova (birth)
- Born: 1 June 1952 (age 74) Moscow, Russian SFSR

Figure skating career
- Country: Soviet Union
- Retired: 1972

Marina Grigorevna Kudriavtseva (née Titova) (Russian: Марина Григорьевна Кудрявцева (Титова), born 1 June 1952) is a Soviet figure skating coach and former competitor.

She married her coach Viktor Kudriavtsev and has one son named Anton.

After her competitive career, she coached skaters Elena Sokolova, Viktoria Volchkova, and Alexander Uspenski, among others.

== Results ==
International
Event	1969–70	1970–71	1971–72	1972–73
European Champ.		12th		
Blue Swords			3rd	
Moscow News		1st	1st	
Prague Skate		5th		
National
Soviet Champ.	6th	1st	1st	4th
