= Anzhelika Pylkina =

Swedish figure skater

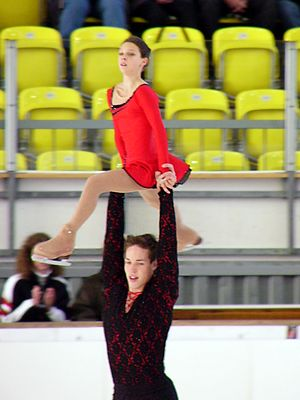
- Pylkina & Hogner in 2004.

Personal information
- Born: 9 August 1990 (age 35) Leningrad, USSR
- Height: 1.48 m (4 ft 10 1/2 in)

Figure skating career
- Country: Sweden
- Coach: Nelli Pylkina
- Skating club: Linköping Skating Club

Anzhelika Pylkina (Russian: Анжелика Пылькина; born 9 August 1990) is a Swedish pair skater. She teamed up with Niklas Hogner in 2003. They were the first Swedish pairs team to compete internationally since 1962. They twice placed 5th at the World Junior Championships and won three bronze medals on the Junior Grand Prix circuit. They won the bronze medal at the 2006 Nebelhorn Trophy and won the Nordic Championships.

They ended their partnership in 2007.

== Programs ==
(with Hogner)

Season	Short program	Free skating	Exhibition
2006–2007	Sozo by Kitaro; Peacock by Rene Dupere	Dracula (soundtrack) by Wojciech Kilar; Interview with a Vampire (soundtrack) by Elliot Goldenthal; Dracula (soundtrack) by Wojciech Kilar	
2004–2005	Samson and Delilah by Camille Saint-Saëns	Jalousie Andalouse by Deb Angelis; All That Remains by Jesse Cook	Aria de Syrna by Saint-Preux

== Results ==
(with Hogner)

Event	2003–2004	2004–2005	2005–2006	2006–2007
World Championships				15th
World Junior Championships		5th	5th	
Nordic Championships			1st	
Swedish Championships	1st J.	1st J.	1st J.	
Cup of Russia			6th	8th
Skate Canada				8th
Trophée Eric Bompard			7th	
Nebelhorn Trophy				3rd
Junior Grand Prix, Poland			3rd	
Junior Grand Prix, Bulgaria			4th	
Junior Grand Prix, Belgrade		3rd		
Junior Grand Prix, Germany		3rd		
J. = Junior level
