= Niklas Hogner =

Swedish figure skater

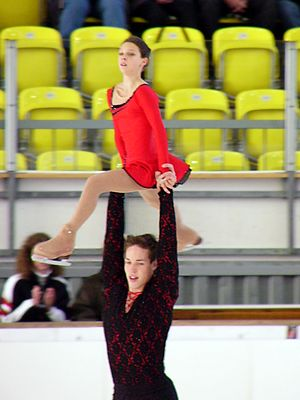
- Pylkina & Hogner in 2004.

Personal information
- Born: 29 September 1984 (age 41)
- Height: 1.86 m (6 ft 1 in)

Figure skating career
- Country: Sweden
- Coach: Nelli Pylkina
- Skating club: Linköping Skating Club

Niklas Hogner (born 29 September 1984 in Linköping, Sweden) is a Swedish figure skater. Until 2003, he competed as a singles skater, winning four Swedish junior national titles and competing at the World Junior Figure Skating Championships.

He switched to pair skating, teaming up with partner Angelika Pylkina in 2003. They were the first Swedish pairs team to compete internationally since 1962. They twice placed 5th at the World Junior Championships and won three bronze medals on the Junior Grand Prix circuit. They won the bronze medal at the 2006 Nebelhorn Trophy and won the Nordic Championships. They ended their partnership in 2007.

== Programs ==
(with Pylkina)

Season	Short program	Free skating	Exhibition
2006–2007	Sozo by Kitaro; Peacock by Rene Dupere	Dracula (soundtrack) by Wojciech Kilar; Interview with a Vampire (soundtrack) by Elliot Goldenthal; Dracula (soundtrack) by Wojciech Kilar	
2004–2005	Samson and Delilah by Camille Saint-Saëns	Jalousie Andalouse by Deb Angelis; All That Remains by Jesse Cook	Aria de Syrna by Saint-Preux

== Results ==
=== Pair skating with Pylkina ===
Event	2003–2004	2004–2005	2005–2006	2006–2007
World Championships				15th
World Junior Championships		5th	5th	
Nordic Championships			1st	
Swedish Championships	1st J.	1st J.	1st J.	
Cup of Russia			6th	8th
Skate Canada				8th
Trophée Eric Bompard			7th	
Nebelhorn Trophy				3rd
Junior Grand Prix, Poland			3rd	
Junior Grand Prix, Bulgaria			4th	
Junior Grand Prix, Belgrade		3rd		
Junior Grand Prix, Germany		3rd		
J. = Junior level

=== Single skating ===
Event	1996–1997	1997–1998	1998–1999	1999–2000	2000–2001	2001–2002	2002–2003
World Junior Championships						27th	
Swedish Championships	5th J.	5th J.	4th J.	1st J.	1st J.	1st J.	1st J.
Nordic Championships				5th J.	4th J.	1st J.	
Junior Grand Prix, Germany							18th
Junior Grand Prix, Canada							15th
Junior Grand Prix, Sweden				22nd		13th	
Junior Grand Prix, Italy						14th	
Junior Grand Prix, Ukraine					14th		
J. = Junior level
