= Yasuharu Nanri =

Japanese figure skater

Japanese name
- Kanji: 南里康晴
- Kana: なんり やすはる

Yasuharu Nanri
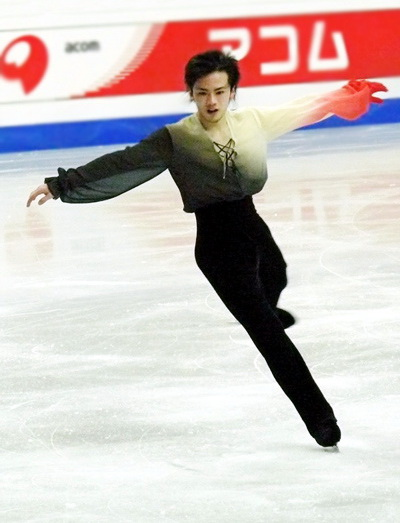
- Nanri in 2008.

Personal information
- Full name: Yasuharu Nanri
- Born: October 6, 1985 (age 41) Fukuoka
- Home town: Fukuoka
- Height: 1.65 m (5 ft 5 in)

Figure skating career
- Country: Japan
- Skating club: Nakamura Gakuen University
- Began skating: 1993
- Retired: 2011

Yasuharu Nanri (南里 康晴, Nanri Yasuharu; born October 6, 1985 in Fukuoka) is a Japanese former figure skater. He is the 2007 and 2008 Japanese national bronze medalist. He competed at the 2008 World Championships, placing 19th with a personal best total score in international competition.

== Programs ==
Season	Short program	Free skating	Exhibition
2010–2011	Introduction and Rondo Capriccioso by Camille Saint-Saëns	Carmen by Georges Bizet; Carmen Suite by Rodion Shchedrin	
2009–2010	Introduction and Rondo Capriccioso by Camille Saint-Saëns	Concierto de Aranjuez by Joaquín Rodrigo	
2008–2009	Moonlight Sonata by Ludwig van Beethoven	Concierto de Aranjuez by Joaquín Rodrigo	津軽海峡・冬景色 by Satoko Koda
2007–2008	Moonlight Sonata by Ludwig van Beethoven	Carmen by Georges Bizet; Carmen Suite by Rodion Shchedrin	
2006–2007	Two Guitars (Russian folk)	Carmen by Georges Bizet; Carmen Suite by Rodion Shchedrin	
2005–2006	The Race	Lorelei	
2004–2005	Two Guitars (Russian folk)	Henry V by Patrick Doyle	

== Competitive highlights ==
Results
International
Event	00–01	01–02	02–03	03–04	04–05	05–06	06–07	07–08	08–09	09–10	10–11
Worlds								19th			
Four Continents						7th	12th		12th	12th	
GP Bompard							9th				
GP Cup of Russia						8th					
GP NHK Trophy								10th	8th		
GP Skate America							11th	10th		9th	
GP Skate Canada									8th		9th
Golden Spin									1st		
Universiade									26th		
International: Junior
Junior Worlds					6th						
JGP Final					2nd						
JGP Hungary					2nd						
JGP Poland				3rd							
JGP Ukraine					1st						
Mladost					1st						
National
Japan Champ.				4th	8th	7th	3rd	3rd	4th	5th	10th
Japan Junior	19th	11th	9th	3rd	3rd						
