= Tritsch-Tratsch-Polka =

1858 polka in A major by Johann Strauss II

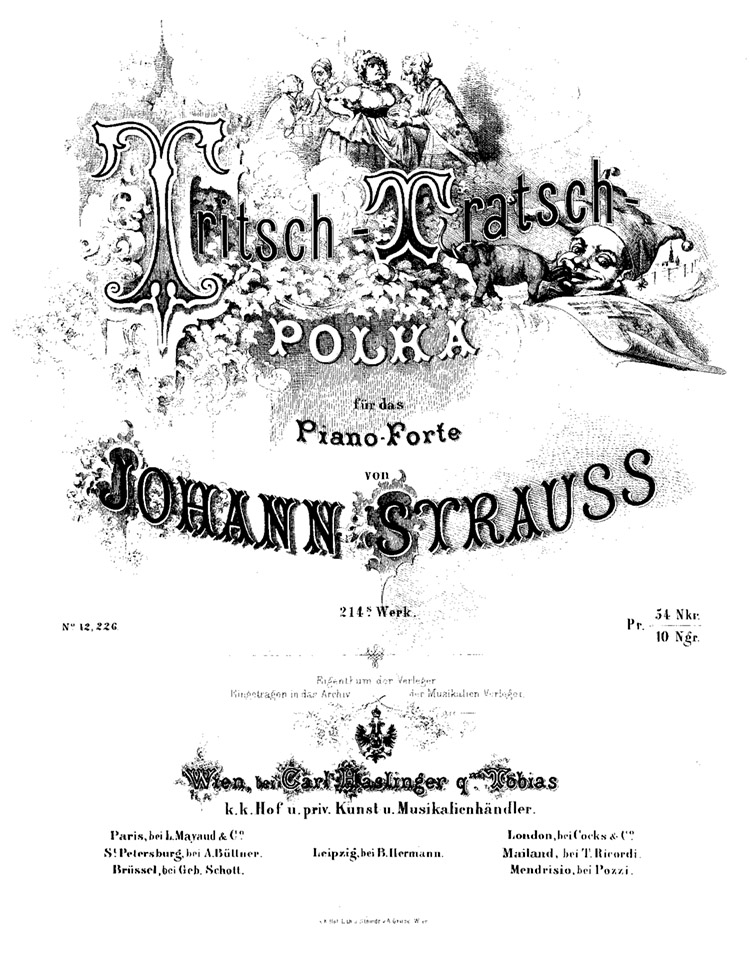
"Tritsch-Tratsch-Polka" by Johann Strauss II

Tritsch-Tratsch-Polka, Op. 214, is a polka in A major by Johann Strauss II, written in 1858 after a successful tour of Russia where he performed in the summer concert season at Pavlovsk, Saint Petersburg. It was first performed in a concert in Vienna on 24 November 1858.

Tritsch-Tratsch (chit-chat) refers to the Viennese passion for gossip. Strauss may also have been referencing the burlesque Der Tritschtratsch by the famous Austrian dramatist and actor Johann Nestroy, which premiered in 1833 and was still in the stage repertoire when the polka was written.

Tritsch-Tratsch Polka performed by the Orchestre Métropolitain de Rennes in 2018

The mood of the piece is jaunty and high-spirited, as were many of Strauss' polkas.
