= Anastasia Gorshkova =

Russian former competitive ice dancer (born 1987)

Personal information
- Full name: Anastasia Alexeyevna Gorshkova
- Born: 13 March 1987 (age 39) Yekaterinburg, Russian SFSR, Soviet Union
- Height: 1.70 m (5 ft 7 in)

Figure skating career
- Country: Russia
- Skating club: Moyor
- Began skating: 1991
- Retired: 2006
Medal record
Representing Russia
Figure skating: Ice dancing
World Junior Championships
Bronze medal – third place	2005 Kitchener	Ice dancing

Anastasia Alexeyevna Gorshkova (born 13 March 1987) is a Russian former competitive ice dancer. She competed with Ilia Tkachenko from 2002 to 2006, coached by her father, Alexei Gorshkov. They won the bronze medal at the 2005 World Junior Championships and four medals on the ISU Junior Grand Prix series — two gold, one silver, one bronze. Gorshkova retired from competition in July 2006 due to a hip injury.

== Further career ==
- In pair with Alexander Belov she participated in “Star Ice” TV show produced by RTR Russia channel in 2008.
- Anastasia Gorshkova participates in the ice show “Sleeping Beauty” of Ilia Averbukh’s theatre and “The Imperial Ice Stars” company.
- In 2017 she won “Mrs France 2017” title and then in Durban, South Africa, she took part in the 40th Annual Mrs Universe Pageant and won “Vice - Mrs Universe” title.

== Programs ==
(with Tkachenko)

Season	Original dance	Free dance
2005–2006	Baila Son	Cirque du Soleil by René Dupéré
2004–2005	Slow foxtrot: Why Don't You Do Right? (from Who Framed Roger Rabbit); Quickstep: Give me that thing	Selection from Kill Bill; Bang, Bang (from Kill Bill); Hu Ha

== Competitive highlights ==
(with Tkachenko)

Results
International: Junior
Event	2004–05	2005–06
World Junior Championships	3rd	7th
JGP Final	5th	5th
JGP Estonia		1st
JGP Poland		1st
JGP Serbia	2nd	
JGP United States	3rd	
National
Russian Junior Championships	2nd	2nd
JGP = Junior Grand Prix
