= Michael Coreno =

Canadian ice dancer (born 1984)

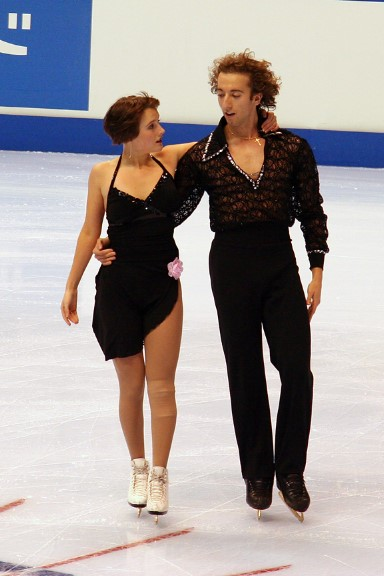
- Hann-McCurdy & Coreno in 2006.

Personal information
- Full name: Michael Coreno
- Born: August 31, 1984 (age 41) Toronto, Ontario, Canada
- Home town: Vancouver, British Columbia, Canada

Figure skating career
- Country: Canada
- Partner: Allie Hann-McCurdy
- Coach: Marina Zoueva; Igor Shpilband
- Skating club: Vancouver SC
- Retired: 21 June 2010
Medal record
Figure skating
Ice dancing
Representing Canada
Four Continents Championships
Silver medal – second place	2010 Jeonju	Ice dancing

Michael Coreno (born August 31, 1984, in Toronto, Ontario) is a Canadian ice dancer. Coreno began skating at age seven. In 2003, he teamed up with Allie Hann-McCurdy, with whom he was 2010 Four Continents silver medallist and 2008 Canadian bronze medallist. The pair retired in June 2010, to coach at the Gloucester Skating Club.

== Competitive highlights ==
=== With Hann-McCurdy ===
Event	2003–04	2004–05	2005–06	2006–07	2007–08	2008–09	2009–10
World Championships					19th		
Four Continents Championships					6th		2nd
World Junior Championships			8th				
Canadian Championships	7th J.	2nd J.	1st J.	8th	3rd	6th	5th
NHK Trophy							8th
Cup of Russia						9th	
Skate America				11th		9th	
Skate Canada International					4th		
Trophée Eric Bompard				10th			
Nebelhorn Trophy				7th	4th		
Junior Grand Prix Final		7th					
Junior Grand Prix, Estonia			2nd				
Junior Grand Prix, Slovakia			4th				
Junior Grand Prix, Ukraine		3rd					
Junior Grand Prix, Hungary		2nd					
J. = Junior level

=== With Steeves ===
Event	2000–01	2001–02	2002–03
Canadian Championships	6th N.	6th N.	3rd N.
N. = Novice level

== Programs ==
(with Hann-McCurdy)

Season	Original dance	Free dance
2009–2010	Italian folk dance: Tarantella Siciliana – San Paolo; La spagnola; Tarantella Siciliana - Sciacca	La Strada by Nino Rota
2008–2009	Lili Marleen by Hans Leip and Norbert Schultze; Over There by Glenn Miller	Pankakoski by Risto Laurita
2007–2008	The Log Driver's Waltz (soundtrack); Newfoundland Country Dance	Rhapsody in Blue by George Gershwin
2006–2007	Tango: Por Una Cabeza by Carlos Gardel	Kyoko's House (Stage Blood is not Enough); Temple of the Golden Pavilon; November 25: The Last Day; Mishima Opening by Michael Riesman, Philip Glass
2005–2006	Mambo: Do You Only Want to Dance; Rhumba: Sway by Michael Buble; Samba: Maria by Ricky Martin	Passionata; Carmen: Habanera; Toreador En Garde by Georges Bizet
2004–2005	Charleston: Buttermilk Race; Foxtrot: Business of Love (from the Mask soundtrack); Quickstep: Oh Maria by Michael Buble	From Beethoven's Last Night by Trans-Siberian Orchestra: Dreams of Candlelight; Beethoven's Last Night; Requiem
