= Viktor Kudriavtsev =

Russian figure skating coach and choreographer (1937–2026)

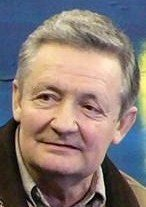
- Kudriavtsev in 2004

Personal information
- Full name: Viktor Nikolayevich Kudriavtsev
- Born: 24 October 1937 Tula, Russian SFSR, Soviet Union
- Died: 22 June 2026 (aged 88)

Viktor Nikolayevich Kudriavtsev (Russian: Виктор Николаевич Кудрявцев; 24 October 1937 – 22 June 2026) was a Russian figure skating coach and choreographer.

== Career ==
Kudriavtsev began skating at age 16 and turned to coaching at 22. His first notable student was Sergey Volkov who excelled at compulsory figures and was the first Soviet skater to win the men's World title. His other students include the 1998 Olympic champion Ilia Kulik, Elena Sokolova, Ilia Klimkin, Viktoria Volchkova, Alexander Shubin, Andrejs Vlaščenko, and Evan Lysacek. Although primarily a singles coach, Kudriavtsev also worked with a few pairs, including Lyudmila Smirnova / Andrei Suraikin.

Early in his coaching career, Kudriavtsev worked at a rink in Sokolniki, then at Kristal in Luzhniki, followed by Olimpiyski, and finally Moskvich. He retired from coaching but remained a consultant. He ran summer training camps in Moscow and in Flims, Switzerland and many international skaters, including Stéphane Lambiel, Lina Johansson, Oscar Peter, and Jamal Othman, trained under him there. He choreographed for the Ice Theatre of New York.

In 2014, he returned to coach Michael Christian Martinez, the first figure skater from a tropical zone to compete in the Winter Olympics, for the 2014 Winter Olympics.

== Personal life and death ==
Kudriavtsev was born on 24 October 1937. He was married to Marina Kudriavtseva, with whom he had a son.

Kudriavtsev died on 22 June 2026, at the age of 88.
