= 2010–11 ISU Grand Prix of Figure Skating =

- Type: Grand Prix
- Date: October 22 – December 12, 2010
- Season: 2010–11
- Previous: 2009–10 Grand Prix
- Next: 2011–12 Grand Prix

The 2010–11 ISU Grand Prix of Figure Skating was the ISU Grand Prix of Figure Skating series of the 2010–11 season. It was a series of six international invitational competitions in the fall of 2010 that built to the Grand Prix Final. Skaters competed in the disciplines of men's singles, ladies singles, pair skating, and ice dancing on the senior level. At each event, skaters earned points based on their placement toward qualifying for the Grand Prix Final. The top six scoring skaters or teams at the end of the series competed at the 2010–2011 Grand Prix Final, held in Beijing, China.

The Grand Prix series set the stage for the 2011 European, Four Continents, and World Championships, as well as each country's national championships. The Grand Prix series began on October 22, 2010, and ended on December 12, 2010.

The Grand Prix was organized by the International Skating Union. Skaters competed for prize money and for a chance to compete in the Grand Prix Final. The corresponding series for junior-level skaters was the 2010–11 ISU Junior Grand Prix.

== Qualifying ==
Skaters who reached the age of 14 by July 1, 2010, were eligible to compete on the senior Grand Prix circuit. The top six skaters/teams from the 2010 World Figure Skating Championships were seeded and then guaranteed two events. Skaters/teams who placed 7th through 12th were also given two events, though they were not considered seeded.

Skaters and teams who were ranked in the top 24 in the world at the end of the 2009-10 season and those who had an ISU personal best in the top-24 on the season's best list for the 2009–10 season were also guaranteed one event.

Skaters/teams who medaled at the 2009–10 JGP Final or the 2010 World Junior Figure Skating Championships were guaranteed one event. Skaters who medaled at both the Junior Grand Prix Final and the World Junior Championships were guaranteed only one event.

The host country was allowed to assign three skaters/teams of their choosing from their country in each discipline.

The spots remaining were filled from the top 75 skaters/teams in the 2009–10 season's best list. Skaters could not be given a Grand Prix invitation without having been on the season's best list, with the following exceptions:

1. The host country could select any three of their own skaters.
2. Pairs and dance teams who had in either the 2008-09 or 2009–10 season qualified for Grand Prix spots by World Championships placement or had held a world ranking or season's best ranking in the top 24 with a previous partner could be considered for an alternate spot with their new partner.
3. Skaters and teams who had previously been seeded (1st through 6th at the World Championships) and had missed any number of seasons could be considered for one or two Grand Prix assignments if they committed to competing at two Grand Prix events and had never taken advantage of this rule in a previous season.

== Schedule ==
Date	Event	Location
October 22–24	2010 NHK Trophy	Nagoya, Japan
October 29–31	2010 Skate Canada International	Kingston, Ontario, Canada
November 5–7	2010 Cup of China	Beijing, China
November 12–14	2010 Skate America	Portland, Oregon, United States
November 19–21	2010 Cup of Russia	Moscow, Russia
November 26–28	2010 Trophée Éric Bompard	Paris, France
December 9–12	2010-11 Grand Prix Final	Beijing, China

== Medal summary ==
Event	Discipline	Gold	Silver	Bronze
(Japan) NHK Trophy	Men	(Japan) Daisuke Takahashi	(United States) Jeremy Abbott	(France) Florent Amodio
(Japan) NHK Trophy	Ladies	(Italy) Carolina Kostner	(United States) Rachael Flatt	(Japan) Kanako Murakami
(Japan) NHK Trophy	Pairs	(China) Pang Qing / Tong Jian	(Russia) Vera Bazarova / Yuri Larionov	(Japan) Narumi Takahashi / Mervin Tran
(Japan) NHK Trophy	Ice dancing	(United States) Meryl Davis / Charlie White	(Canada) Kaitlyn Weaver / Andrew Poje	(United States) Maia Shibutani / Alex Shibutani

Event	Discipline	Gold	Silver	Bronze
Skate Canada International	Men	(Canada) Patrick Chan	(Japan) Nobunari Oda	(United States) Adam Rippon
Skate Canada International	Ladies	(United States) Alissa Czisny	(Russia) Ksenia Makarova	(Canada) Amélie Lacoste
Skate Canada International	Pairs	(Russia) Lubov Iliushechkina / Nodari Maisuradze	(Canada) Kirsten Moore-Towers / Dylan Moscovitch	(Canada) Paige Lawrence / Rudi Swiegers
Skate Canada International	Ice dancing	(Canada) Vanessa Crone / Paul Poirier	(United Kingdom) Sinead Kerr / John Kerr	(United States) Madison Chock / Greg Zuerlein

Event	Discipline	Gold	Silver	Bronze
Cup of China	Men	(Japan) Takahiko Kozuka	(United States) Brandon Mroz	(Czech Republic) Tomáš Verner
Cup of China	Ladies	(Japan) Miki Ando	(Japan) Akiko Suzuki	(Russia) Alena Leonova
Cup of China	Pairs	(China) Pang Qing / Tong Jian	(China) Sui Wenjing / Han Cong	(United States) Caitlin Yankowskas / John Coughlin
Cup of China	Ice dancing	(France) Nathalie Péchalat / Fabian Bourzat	(Russia) Ekaterina Bobrova / Dmitri Soloviev	(Italy) Federica Faiella / Massimo Scali

Event	Discipline	Gold	Silver	Bronze
(United States) Skate America	Men	(Japan) Daisuke Takahashi	(Japan) Nobunari Oda	(United States) Armin Mahbanoozadeh
(United States) Skate America	Ladies	(Japan) Kanako Murakami	(United States) Rachael Flatt	(Italy) Carolina Kostner
(United States) Skate America	Pairs	(Germany) Aliona Savchenko / Robin Szolkowy	(Canada) Kirsten Moore-Towers / Dylan Moscovitch	(China) Sui Wenjing / Han Cong
(United States) Skate America	Ice dancing	(United States) Meryl Davis / Charlie White	(Canada) Vanessa Crone / Paul Poirer	(United States) Maia Shibutani / Alex Shibutani

Event	Discipline	Gold	Silver	Bronze
(Russia) Rostelecom Cup	Men	(Czech Republic) Tomáš Verner	(Canada) Patrick Chan	(United States) Jeremy Abbott
(Russia) Rostelecom Cup	Ladies	(Japan) Miki Ando	(Japan) Akiko Suzuki	(United States) Ashley Wagner
(Russia) Rostelecom Cup	Pairs	(Russia) Yuko Kavaguti / Alexander Smirnov	(Japan) Narumi Takahashi / Mervin Tran	(United States) Amanda Evora / Mark Ladwig
(Russia) Rostelecom Cup	Ice dancing	(Russia) Ekaterina Bobrova / Dmitri Soloviev	(Hungary) Nóra Hoffmann / Maxim Zavozin	(Russia) Elena Ilinykh / Nikita Katsalapov

Event	Discipline	Gold	Silver	Bronze
(France) Trophée Eric Bompard	Men	(Japan) Takahiko Kozuka	(France) Florent Amodio	(United States) Brandon Mroz
(France) Trophée Eric Bompard	Ladies	(Finland) Kiira Korpi	(United States) Mirai Nagasu	(United States) Alissa Czisny
(France) Trophée Eric Bompard	Pairs	(Germany) Aliona Savchenko / Robin Szolkowy	(Russia) Vera Bazarova / Yuri Larionov	(Germany) Maylin Hausch / Daniel Wende
(France) Trophée Eric Bompard	Ice dancing	(France) Nathalie Péchalat / Fabian Bourzat	(Russia) Ekaterina Riazanova / Ilia Tkachenko	(United States) Madison Chock / Greg Zuerlein

Event	Discipline	Gold	Silver	Bronze
Grand Prix Final	Men	(Canada) Patrick Chan	(Japan) Nobunari Oda	(Japan) Takahiko Kozuka
Grand Prix Final	Ladies	(United States) Alissa Czisny	(Italy) Carolina Kostner	(Japan) Kanako Murakami
Grand Prix Final	Pairs	(Germany) Aliona Savchenko / Robin Szolkowy	(China) Pang Qing / Tong Jian	(China) Sui Wenjing / Han Cong
Grand Prix Final	Ice dancing	(United States) Meryl Davis / Charlie White	(France) Nathalie Péchalat / Fabian Bourzat	(Canada) Vanessa Crone / Paul Poirier

== Grand Prix Final qualification points ==
After the final event, the 2010 Trophée Eric Bompard, the six skaters/teams with the most points advanced to the Grand Prix Final. The point system is as follows:

Placement	Points (Singles/Dance)	Points (Pairs)
1st place	15 points	15 points
2nd place	13 points	13 points
3rd place	11 points	11 points
4th place	9 points	9 points
5th place	7 points	7 points
6th place	5 points	5 points
7th place	4 points	
8th place	3 points	

There are seven tie-breakers in cases of a tie in overall points:

1. Highest placement at an event. If a skater placed 1st and 3rd, the tiebreaker is the 1st place, and that beats a skater who placed 2nd in both events.
2. Highest combined total scores in both events. If a skater earned 200 points at one event and 250 at a second, that skater would win in the second tie-break over a skater who earned 200 points at one event and 150 at another.
3. Participated in two events.
4. Highest combined scores in the free skating/free dancing portion of both events.
5. Highest individual score in the free skating/free dancing portion from one event.
6. Highest combined scores in the short program/original dance of both events.
7. Highest number of total participants at the events.

If there is still a tie, the tie is considered unbreakable and the tied skaters all qualify for the Grand Prix Final.

=== Qualification standings* ===
Skaters in bold qualified for the Grand Prix Final.

Points	Men	Ladies	Pairs	Ice dance
30	(Japan) **Takahiko Kozuka** (Japan) **Daisuke Takahashi**	(Japan) **Miki Ando**	(Germany) **Aliona Savchenko / Robin Szolkowy** (China) **Pang Qing / Tong Jian**	(United States) **Meryl Davis / Charlie White** (France) **Nathalie Péchalat / Fabian Bourzat**
28	(Canada) **Patrick Chan**			(Canada) **Vanessa Crone / Paul Poirer** (Russia) **Ekaterina Bobrova / Dmitri Soloviev**
26	(Czech Republic) **Tomáš Verner** (Japan) **Nobunari Oda**	(United States) **Alissa Czisny** (Italy) **Carolina Kostner** (Japan) **Kanako Murakami** (Japan) **Akiko Suzuki** (United States) **Rachael Flatt**	(Russia) **Vera Bazarova / Yuri Larionov** (Canada) **Kirsten Moore-Towers / Dylan Moscovitch**	
24	(France) **Florent Amodio** (United States) Jeremy Abbott (United States) Brandon Mroz	(Finland) Kiira Korpi	(Russia) **Lubov Iliushechkina / Nodari Maisuradze** (China) **Sui Wenjing / Han Cong** (Japan) Narumi Takahashi / Mervin Tran	
22		(United States) Mirai Nagasu		(Canada) **Kaitlyn Weaver / Andrew Poje** (Hungary) **Nóra Hoffmann / Maxim Zavozin** (United States) Maia Shibutani / Alex Shibutani (United States) Madison Chock / Greg Zuerlein
20	(United States) Adam Rippon		(United States) Caitlin Yankowskas / John Coughlin	(Russia) Ekaterina Riazanova / Ilia Tkachenko (Russia) Elena Ilinykh / Nikita Katsalapov
19				
18	(Canada) Kevin Reynolds	(United States) Ashley Wagner (Canada) Amélie Lacoste (Canada) Cynthia Phaneuf	(Canada) Paige Lawrence / Rudi Swiegers (United States) Amanda Evora / Mark Ladwig	
17		(Russia) Ksenia Makarova		
16			(United States) Caydee Denney / Jeremy Barrett	(France) Pernelle Carron / Lloyd Jones
15			(Russia) Yuko Kavaguti / Alexander Smirnov	
14	(Italy) Samuel Contesti	(United States) Agnes Zawadzki	(United States) Marissa Castelli / Simon Shnapir (Canada) Mylene Brodeur / John Mattatall	(Russia) Kristina Gorshkova / Vitali Butikov (China) Huang Xintong / Zheng Xun
13	(Japan) Yuzuru Hanyu	(Sweden) Joshi Helgesson		(United Kingdom) Sinead Kerr / John Kerr
12	(France) Alban Preaubert	(Japan) Haruka Imai		(Czech Republic) Lucie Myslivečková / Matěj Novák
11	(United States) Armin Mahbanoozadeh	(Russia) Alena Leonova	(Germany) Maylin Hausch / Daniel Wende	(Italy) Federica Faiella / Massimo Scali
10	(Canada) Shawn Sawyer	(Italy) Valentina Marchei (Japan) Mao Asada		
9	(France) Brian Joubert (Russia) Artur Gachinski	(Georgia (country)) Elene Gedevanishvili	(Russia) Katerina Gerboldt / Alexander Enbert	(Canada) Alexandra Paul / Mitchell Islam (Canada) Kharis Ralph / Asher Hill
8	(Belgium) Kevin van der Perren			(Japan) Cathy Reed / Chris Reed
7	(Spain) Javier Fernandez (Japan) Tatsuki Machida (Japan) Daisuke Murakami (France) Chafik Besseghier	(China) Geng Bingwa (Canada) Myriane Samson	(United States) Felicia Zhang / Taylor Toth (Russia) Ksenia Stolbova / Fedor Klimov (Canada) Meagan Duhamel / Eric Radford	(Italy) Anna Cappellini / Luca Lanotte
6				(United Kingdom) Penny Coomes / Nicholas Buckland
5	(China) Song Nan (Japan) Takahito Mura	(Sweden) Viktoria Helgesson (Russia) Sofia Biryukova (United States) Amanda Dobbs	(United States) Britney Simpson / Nathan Miller (Italy) Stefania Berton / Ondre Hotarek (Italy) Nicole Della Monica / Yannick Kocon (Czech Republic) Klára Kadlecová / Petr Bidař	(United States) Lynn Kriengkrairut / Logan Giulietti-Schmitt (United States) Madison Hubbell / Keiffer Hubbell
4	(United States) Ross Miner (Sweden) Adrian Schultheiss (China) Wu Jialiang (Germany) Peter Liebers	(Spain) Sonia Lafuente (United States) Caroline Zhang		(United States) Isabella Cannuscio / Ian Lorello (Canada) Sarah Arnold / Justin Trojek
3	(Canada) Jeremy Ten (Ukraine) Anton Kovalevski (China) Guan Jinlin (Russia) Ivan Tretiakov	(France) Maé-Bérénice Méité (Japan) Fumie Suguri (United States) Kristine Musademba		(China) Yu Xiaoyang / Wang Chen (Germany) Stefanie Frohberg / Tim Giesen (Hungary) Dora Turoczi / Balazs Major
0	(Japan) Yasuharu Nanri (United States) Stephen Carttiere (Romania) Zoltan Kelemen (United States) Grant Hochstein (Russia) Konstantin Menshov (Kazakhstan) Denis Ten (Sweden) Kristoffer Berntsson (China) Chen Peitong (Italy) Paolo Bacchini (Austria) Viktor Pfeifer (Russia) Sergei Voronov	(South Korea) Kwak Min-jeong (United Kingdom) Jenna Mccorkell (France) Lena Marrocco (Canada) Diane Szmiett (Estonia) Elena Glebova (Germany) Sarah Hecken (United States) Alexe Gilles (France) Candice Didier (Switzerland) Sarah Meier (China) Zhu Qiuying	(China) Dong Huibo / Wu Yiming (Hungary) Anna Khnychenkova / Mark Magyar (United Kingdom) Stacey Kemp / David King (China) Zhang Yue / Wang Lei (Russia) Tatiana Novik / Mikhail Kuznetsov (Canada) Kaleigh Hole / Adam Johnson	(China) Guan Xueting / Wang Meng (United States) Rachel Tibbetts / Collin Brubaker
