= 2010 Cup of China =

- Type: Grand Prix
- Date: November 4 – 7
- Season: 2010–11
- Location: Beijing
- Host: Chinese Skating Association
- Venue: Capital Indoor Stadium

Champions
- Men's singles: (Japan) Takahiko Kozuka
- Ladies' singles: (Japan) Miki Ando
- Pairs: (China) Pang Qing / Tong Jian
- Ice dance: (France) Nathalie Pechalat / Fabian Bourzat
- Previous: 2009 Cup of China
- Next: 2011 Cup of China
- Previous GP: 2010 Skate Canada International
- Next GP: 2010 Skate America

The 2010 Cup of China was the third event of six in the 2010–11 ISU Grand Prix of Figure Skating, a senior-level international invitational competition series. It was held at the Capital Indoor Stadium in Beijing on November 4–7. Medals were awarded in the disciplines of men's singles, ladies' singles, pair skating, and ice dancing. Skaters earned points toward qualifying for the 2010–11 Grand Prix Final.

== Schedule ==
(Local Time, GMT +08:00)

- Friday, November 5
  - 14:45 - Ice dancing short dance
  - 16:30 - Ladies' short program
  - 18:25 - Men's short program
  - 20:20 - Pairs' short program
- Saturday, November 6
  - 14:00 - Ice dancing free dance
  - 15:55 - Ladies' free skating
  - 18:05 - Men's free skating
  - 20:25 - Pairs' free skating
- Sunday, November 7
  - Exhibition gala

== Results ==
=== Men ===
| Rank | Name | Nation | Total points | SP | | FS | |
|---|---|---|---|---|---|---|---|
| 1 | Takahiko Kozuka | Japan | 233.51 | 1 | 77.40 | 1 | 156.11 |
| 2 | Brandon Mroz | United States | 216.80 | 4 | 69.84 | 2 | 146.96 |
| 3 | Tomáš Verner | Czech Republic | 214.81 | 3 | 70.31 | 3 | 144.50 |
| 4 | Brian Joubert | France | 210.29 | 2 | 74.80 | 5 | 135.49 |
| 5 | Tatsuki Machida | Japan | 200.95 | 7 | 66.78 | 6 | 134.17 |
| 6 | Samuel Contesti | Italy | 198.84 | 9 | 60.60 | 4 | 138.24 |
| 7 | Ross Miner | United States | 197.13 | 6 | 67.10 | 8 | 130.03 |
| 8 | Guan Jinlin | China | 196.92 | 8 | 64.95 | 7 | 131.97 |
| 9 | Peter Liebers | Germany | 175.94 | 10 | 59.78 | 9 | 116.16 |
| 10 | Wu Jialiang | China | 172.56 | 11 | 57.76 | 10 | 114.80 |
| 11 | Chen Peitong | China | 150.69 | 12 | 54.85 | 11 | 95.84 |
| WD | Sergei Voronov | Russia | | 5 | 68.70 | | |

=== Ladies ===
| Rank | Name | Nation | Total points | SP | | FS | |
|---|---|---|---|---|---|---|---|
| 1 | Miki Ando | Japan | 172.21 | 3 | 56.11 | 1 | 116.10 |
| 2 | Akiko Suzuki | Japan | 162.86 | 2 | 57.97 | 2 | 104.89 |
| 3 | Alena Leonova | Russia | 148.61 | 5 | 50.79 | 3 | 97.82 |
| 4 | Mirai Nagasu | United States | 146.23 | 1 | 58.76 | 5 | 87.47 |
| 5 | Geng Bingwa | China | 142.48 | 4 | 51.09 | 4 | 91.39 |
| 6 | Amanda Dobbs | United States | 132.45 | 7 | 46.73 | 6 | 85.72 |
| 7 | Joshi Helgesson | Sweden | 131.40 | 6 | 48.83 | 7 | 82.57 |
| 8 | Kristine Musademba | United States | 119.45 | 8 | 40.80 | 8 | 78.65 |
| 9 | Kwak Min-jeong | South Korea | 113.98 | 9 | 38.83 | 9 | 75.15 |
| 10 | Diane Szmiett | Canada | 95.43 | 10 | 38.17 | 10 | 57.26 |
| WD | Zhu Qiuying | China | 35.61 | 11 | 35.61 | | |

=== Pairs ===
| Rank | Name | Nation | Total points | SP | | FS | |
|---|---|---|---|---|---|---|---|
| 1 | Pang Qing / Tong Jian | China | 177.50 | 1 | 60.62 | 1 | 116.88 |
| 2 | Sui Wenjing / Han Cong | China | 171.47 | 2 | 59.58 | 2 | 111.89 |
| 3 | Caitlin Yankowskas / John Coughlin | United States | 166.72 | 3 | 57.86 | 3 | 108.86 |
| 4 | Lubov Iliushechkina / Nodari Maisuradze | Russia | 162.09 | 4 | 55.85 | 4 | 106.24 |
| 5 | Amanda Evora / Mark Ladwig | United States | 151.66 | 5 | 51.46 | 5 | 100.20 |
| 6 | Nicole Della Monica / Yannick Kocon | Italy | 145.21 | 6 | 49.81 | 6 | 95.40 |
| 7 | Dong Huibo / Wu Yiming | China | 123.93 | 7 | 46.05 | 7 | 77.88 |
| 8 | Kaleigh Hole / Adam Johnson | Canada | 115.15 | 8 | 43.02 | 8 | 72.13 |

=== Ice dancing ===
| Rank | Name | Nation | Total points | SD | | FD | |
|---|---|---|---|---|---|---|---|
| 1 | Nathalie Péchalat / Fabian Bourzat | France | 159.59 | 1 | 64.12 | 1 | 95.47 |
| 2 | Ekaterina Bobrova / Dmitri Soloviev | Russia | 145.39 | 3 | 55.85 | 2 | 89.54 |
| 3 | Federica Faiella / Massimo Scali | Italy | 139.52 | 2 | 57.21 | 3 | 82.31 |
| 4 | Nóra Hoffmann / Maxim Zavozin | Hungary | 130.82 | 4 | 52.69 | 4 | 78.13 |
| 5 | Huang Xintong / Zheng Xun | China | 124.60 | 5 | 49.70 | 6 | 74.90 |
| 6 | Madison Hubbell / Keiffer Hubbell | United States | 120.95 | 8 | 44.47 | 5 | 76.48 |
| 7 | Kharis Ralph / Asher Hill | Canada | 119.51 | 6 | 48.10 | 7 | 71.41 |
| 8 | Yu Xiaoyang / Wang Chen | China | 114.46 | 7 | 45.33 | 8 | 69.13 |
| 9 | Guan Xueting / Wang Meng | China | 105.91 | 9 | 40.19 | 9 | 65.72 |
| 10 | Isabella Cannuscio / Ian Lorello | United States | 101.83 | 10 | 38.34 | 10 | 63.49 |
