= 2010 Skate Canada International =

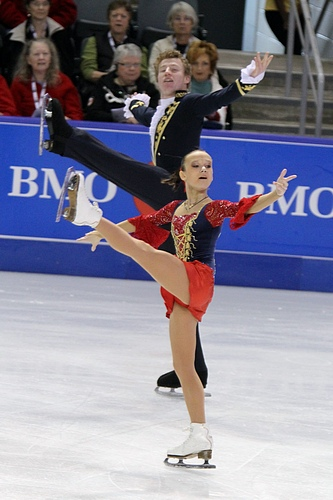
- Type: Grand Prix
- Date: October 28 – 31
- Season: 2010–11
- Location: Kingston, Ontario
- Host: Skate Canada
- Venue: K-Rock Centre

Champions
- Men's singles: (Canada) Patrick Chan
- Ladies' singles: (United States) Alissa Czisny
- Pairs: (Russia) Lubov Iliushechkina / Nodari Maisuradze
- Ice dance: (Canada) Vanessa Crone / Paul Poirier
- Previous: 2009 Skate Canada International
- Next: 2011 Skate Canada International
- Previous Grand Prix: 2010 NHK Trophy
- Next Grand Prix: 2010 Cup of China

The 2010 Skate Canada International was the second event of six in the 2010–11 ISU Grand Prix of Figure Skating, a senior-level international invitational competition series. It was held at the K-Rock Centre in Kingston, Ontario on October 28–31. Medals were awarded in the disciplines of men's singles, ladies' singles, pair skating, and ice dancing. Skaters earned points toward qualifying for the 2010–11 Grand Prix Final.

== Schedule ==
- October 28 - Practice sessions
- October 29 - Ladies' short, Pairs short, Men's short, Short dance
- October 30 - Pairs' free, Men's free, Ladies' free
- October 31 - Free dance, Exhibition

== Results ==
=== Men ===
Rank	Name	Nation	Total points	SP		FS	
1	Patrick Chan	Canada	239.52	4	73.20	1	166.32
2	Nobunari Oda	Japan	236.52	1	81.37	3	155.15
3	Adam Rippon	United States	233.04	3	77.53	2	155.51
4	Kevin Reynolds	Canada	218.65	2	80.09	6	138.56
5	Javier Fernández	Spain	210.85	6	66.74	4	144.11
6	Alban Préaubert	France	209.05	5	69.71	5	139.34
7	Artur Gachinski	Russia	204.08	7	66.57	7	137.51
8	Jeremy Ten	Canada	191.86	9	60.70	8	131.16
9	Yasuharu Nanri	Japan	188.96	8	61.00	9	127.96
10	Grant Hochstein	United States	181.65	12	56.98	10	124.67
11	Kristoffer Berntsson	Sweden	175.84	11	57.49	11	118.35
12	Paolo Bacchini	Italy	167.60	10	59.78	12	107.82

=== Ladies ===
Rank	Name	Nation	Total points	SP		FS	
1	Alissa Czisny	United States	172.37	4	55.95	1	116.42
2	Ksenia Makarova	Russia	165.00	2	57.90	2	107.10
3	Amélie Lacoste	Canada	157.26	5	55.30	4	101.96
4	Cynthia Phaneuf	Canada	156.24	1	58.24	7	98.00
5	Haruka Imai	Japan	154.54	6	52.52	3	102.02
6	Agnes Zawadzki	United States	154.35	3	56.29	6	98.06
7	Myriane Samson	Canada	152.05	7	51.62	5	100.43
8	Valentina Marchei	Italy	137.78	9	45.57	8	92.21
9	Fumie Suguri	Japan	132.84	8	48.17	10	84.67
10	Sonia Lafuente	Spain	131.20	10	42.76	9	88.44
11	Alexe Gilles	United States	125.64	11	41.02	11	84.62
WD	Sarah Meier	Switzerland					

=== Pairs ===
Rank	Name	Nation	Total points	SP		FS	
1	Lubov Iliushechkina / Nodari Maisuradze	Russia	171.40	1	60.72	2	110.68
2	Kirsten Moore-Towers / Dylan Moscovitch	Canada	170.92	5	53.68	1	117.24
3	Paige Lawrence / Rudi Swiegers	Canada	161.15	3	56.14	3	105.01
4	Marissa Castelli / Simon Shnapir	United States	159.85	2	56.34	5	103.51
5	Meagan Duhamel / Eric Radford	Canada	158.53	4	54.80	4	103.73
6	Britney Simpson / Nathan Miller	United States	134.05	6	46.39	6	87.66
7	Dong Huibo / Wu Yiming	China	129.26	7	43.53	7	85.73
8	Stacey Kemp / David King	United Kingdom	125.52	8	43.50	8	82.02

=== Ice dancing ===
Rank	Name	Nation	Total points	SD		FD	
1	Vanessa Crone / Paul Poirier	Canada	154.42	2	62.95	1	91.47
2	Sinead Kerr / John Kerr	United Kingdom	149.80	1	62.96	3	86.84
3	Madison Chock / Greg Zuerlein	United States	139.05	4	54.19	4	84.86
4	Alexandra Paul / Mitchell Islam	Canada	138.16	6	50.55	2	87.61
5	Pernelle Carron / Lloyd Jones	France	136.03	3	54.43	5	81.60
6	Kristina Gorshkova / Vitali Butikov	Russia	127.45	5	51.56	6	75.89
7	Sarah Arnold / Justin Trojek	Canada	107.64	8	40.07	7	67.57
8	Stefanie Frohberg / Tim Giesen	Germany	105.10	7	43.00	8	62.10
9	Rachel Tibbetts / Collin Brubaker	United States	95.86	9	36.88	9	58.98
