= 2010 NHK Trophy =

- Type: Grand Prix
- Date: October 22 – 24
- Season: 2010–11
- Location: Nagoya
- Host: Japan Skating Federation
- Venue: Nippon Gaishi Ice Arena

Champions
- Men's singles: (Japan) Daisuke Takahashi
- Ladies' singles: (Italy) Carolina Kostner
- Pairs: (China) Pang Qing / Tong Jian
- Ice dance: (United States) Meryl Davis / Charlie White
- Previous: 2009 NHK Trophy
- Next: 2011 NHK Trophy
- Next Grand Prix: 2010 Skate Canada

The 2010 NHK Trophy was the first event of six in the 2010–11 ISU Grand Prix of Figure Skating, a senior-level international invitational competition series. It was held at the Nippon Gaishi Ice Arena in Nagoya on October 22–24. Medals were awarded in the disciplines of men's singles, ladies' singles, pair skating, and ice dancing. Skaters earned points toward qualifying for the 2010–11 Grand Prix Final.

This was the first Grand Prix event with the new ice dancing format of a short dance/free dance rather than a compulsory dance/original dance/free dance.

== Schedule ==
- Friday, Oct. 22
  - Short dance
  - Pairs' short program
  - Ladies' short program
- Saturday, Oct. 23
  - Men's short program
  - Free dance
  - Pairs' free skating
  - Ladies' free skating
- Sunday, Oct. 24
  - Men's free skating
  - Exhibition gala

== Results ==
=== Men ===
Rank	Name	Nation	Total points	SP		FS	
1	Daisuke Takahashi	Japan	234.79	1	78.04	1	156.75
2	Jeremy Abbott	United States	218.19	2	74.62	3	143.57
3	Florent Amodio	France	213.77	4	70.01	2	143.76
4	Yuzuru Hanyu	Japan	207.72	5	69.31	4	138.41
5	Shawn Sawyer	Canada	193.80	3	70.15	8	123.65
6	Takahito Mura	Japan	191.85	9	63.20	6	128.65
7	Jialiang Wu	China	189.58	8	64.06	7	125.52
8	Kevin van der Perren	Belgium	189.41	11	55.31	5	134.10
9	Ross Miner	United States	186.62	7	64.85	10	121.77
10	Adrian Schultheiss	Sweden	181.47	10	62.24	11	119.23
11	Jeremy Ten	Canada	176.48	12	54.48	9	122.00
12	Denis Ten	Kazakhstan	171.68	6	68.74	12	102.94

=== Ladies ===
Rank	Name	Nation	Total points	SP		FS	
1	Carolina Kostner	Italy	164.61	1	57.27	2	107.34
2	Rachael Flatt	United States	161.04	3	53.69	1	107.35
3	Kanako Murakami	Japan	150.16	2	56.10	5	94.06
4	Kiira Korpi	Finland	148.44	5	52.60	4	95.84
5	Ashley Wagner	United States	143.73	4	52.93	6	90.80
6	Elene Gedevanishvili	Georgia	141.52	9	44.51	3	97.01
7	Caroline Zhang	United States	133.86	6	50.71	9	83.15
8	Mao Asada	Japan	133.40	8	47.95	8	85.45
9	Victoria Helgesson	Sweden	130.11	10	43.66	7	86.45
10	Léna Marrocco	France	122.03	11	41.67	10	80.36
11	Jenna McCorkell	United Kingdom	121.52	7	49.07	11	72.45
12	Diane Szmiett	Canada	88.33	12	31.90	12	56.43

=== Pairs ===
Rank	Name	Nation	Total points	SP		FS	
1	Pang Qing / Tong Jian	China	189.37	1	67.10	1	122.27
2	Vera Bazarova / Yuri Larionov	Russia	173.83	2	60.16	2	113.67
3	Narumi Takahashi / Mervin Tran	Japan	155.66	3	57.23	4	98.43
4	Caitlin Yankowskas / John Coughlin	United States	154.88	6	54.19	3	100.69
5	Caydee Denney / Jeremy Barrett	United States	152.38	4	55.03	7	97.35
6	Mylène Brodeur / John Mattatall	Canada	151.97	5	54.28	6	97.69
7	Maylin Hausch / Daniel Wende	Germany	148.31	7	50.49	5	97.82
8	Zhang Yue / Wang Lei	China	138.55	8	49.72	8	88.83

=== Ice dancing ===
Rank	Name	Nation	Total points	SD		FD	
1	Meryl Davis / Charlie White	United States	165.21	1	66.97	1	98.24
2	Kaitlyn Weaver / Andrew Poje	Canada	141.57	2	58.69	3	82.88
3	Maia Shibutani / Alex Shibutani	United States	136.93	5	53.68	2	83.25
4	Elena Ilinykh / Nikita Katsalapov	Russia	135.05	3	56.89	4	78.16
5	Anna Cappellini / Luca Lanotte	Italy	127.43	4	55.68	5	71.75
6	Lucie Myslivečková / Matěj Novák	Czech Republic	115.17	6	45.20	6	69.97
7	Cathy Reed / Chris Reed	Japan	114.52	7	44.90	7	69.62
8	Penny Coomes / Nicholas Buckland	United Kingdom	109.80	8	43.52	8	66.28
9	Yu Xiaoyang / Wang Chen	China	102.65	9	43.50	9	59.15
10	Dora Turoczi / Balazs Major	Hungary	87.40	10	32.68	10	54.72
