= 2010 World Figure Skating Championships =

Annual figure skating competition held in 2010

- Type: ISU Championship
- Date: 22 March – 28
- Season: 2009–10
- Location: Turin, Italy
- Host: Federazione Italiana Sport del Ghiaccio
- Venue: Palavela

Champions
- Men's singles: (Japan) Daisuke Takahashi
- Ladies' singles: (Japan) Mao Asada
- Pairs: (China) Pang Qing / Tong Jian
- Ice dance: (Canada) Tessa Virtue / Scott Moir
- Previous: 2009 World Championships
- Next: 2011 World Championships

The 2010 World Figure Skating Championships was a senior international figure skating competition in the 2009–10 season. Medals were awarded in the disciplines of men's singles, ladies' singles, pair skating, and ice dancing. The event was held at the Palavela in Turin, Italy from 22 to 28 March.

== Qualification ==
The competition was open to skaters from ISU member nations who had reached the age of 15 by 1 July 2009. The corresponding competition for younger skaters was the 2010 World Junior Championships.

Based on the results of the 2009 World Championships, each country was allowed between one and three entries per discipline. National associations selected their entries based on their own criteria.

Countries which qualified more than one entry per discipline:

Spots	Men	Ladies	Pairs	Dance
3	Japan; United States	Japan	China; Russia	Russia; United States
2	Canada; Czech Republic; France; Italy; Kazakhstan; Russia	Canada; Finland; Georgia; Russia; South Korea; Switzerland; United States	Canada; Germany; Ukraine; United States	Canada; France; Italy (United Kingdom) Great Britain

== Schedule ==
(Local time, UTC+1)

- Tuesday, 23 March
  - 12:00 Compulsory dance
  - 17:15 Opening ceremonies
  - 18:15 Pairs short program
- Wednesday, 24 March
  - 09:30 Men's short program
  - 18:45 Pairs free skating
- Thursday, 25 March
  - 12:45 Original dance
  - 18:15 Men's free skating
- Friday, 26 March
  - 09:00 Ladies' short program
  - 18:45 Free dance
- Saturday, 27 March
  - 12:30 Ladies' free skating
- Sunday, 28 March
  - 14:30 Gala exhibition

== Medals summary ==
=== Medalists ===
Medals for overall placement:

Discipline	Gold	Silver	Bronze
Men	(Japan) Daisuke Takahashi	(Canada) Patrick Chan	(France) Brian Joubert
Ladies	(Japan) Mao Asada	(South Korea) Kim Yuna	(Finland) Laura Lepistö
Pairs	(China) Pang Qing / Tong Jian	(Germany) Aliona Savchenko / Robin Szolkowy	(Russia) Yuko Kavaguti / Alexander Smirnov
Ice dancing	(Canada) Tessa Virtue / Scott Moir	(United States) Meryl Davis / Charlie White	(Italy) Federica Faiella / Massimo Scali

Small medals for placement in the short segment:

Discipline	Gold	Silver	Bronze
Men	(Japan) Daisuke Takahashi	(Canada) Patrick Chan	(France) Brian Joubert
Ladies	(United States) Mirai Nagasu	(Japan) Mao Asada	(Finland) Laura Lepistö
Pairs	(China) Pang Qing / Tong Jian	(Russia) Yuko Kavaguti / Alexander Smirnov	(Germany) Aliona Savchenko / Robin Szolkowy
Ice dancing	(Canada) Tessa Virtue / Scott Moir	(United States) Meryl Davis / Charlie White	(Italy) Federica Faiella / Massimo Scali

Small medals for placement in the free segment:

Discipline	Gold	Silver	Bronze
Men	(Japan) Daisuke Takahashi	(Canada) Patrick Chan	(Czech Republic) Michal Březina
Ladies	(South Korea) Kim Yuna	(Japan) Mao Asada	(Japan) Miki Ando
Pairs	(China) Pang Qing / Tong Jian	(Germany) Aliona Savchenko / Robin Szolkowy	(Russia) Yuko Kavaguti / Alexander Smirnov
Ice dancing	(United States) Meryl Davis / Charlie White	(Canada) Tessa Virtue / Scott Moir	(France) Nathalie Pechalat / Fabian Bourzat

=== Medals by country ===
Table of medals for overall placement:

Rank	Nation	Gold	Silver	Bronze	Total
1	Japan (JPN)	2	0	0	2
2	Canada (CAN)	1	1	0	2
3	China (CHN)	1	0	0	1
4	Germany (GER)	0	1	0	1
4	South Korea (KOR)	0	1	0	1
4	United States (USA)	0	1	0	1
7	Finland (FIN)	0	0	1	1
7	France (FRA)	0	0	1	1
7	Italy (ITA)	0	0	1	1
7	Russia (RUS)	0	0	1	1
Totals (10 entries)		4	4	4	12

== Competition notes ==
- The compulsory dance was the Golden Waltz. 2010 Worlds were the final event to include a compulsory dance. The last compulsory dance in competition was skated by Federica Faiella and Massimo Scali. Canada's Tessa Virtue / Scott Moir set a world record for the original dance, earning 70.27 points, 2010 Worlds were also the final event to include an original dance.
- Daisuke Takahashi became the first Japanese man to win a world title. He attempted a quad flip which made him the first gold medalist to try a quad since 2007 Worlds, but he underrotated the jump, making him the third champion in a row not to land one successfully.
- Mao Asada became the first ladies figure skater from Asia to win multiple world titles.
- Japan won two of the four titles, and both singles titles for the first time.
- Laura Lepistö became the first Finn to medal in ladies' singles at the World Championships.

== Results ==
=== Men ===
Rank	Name	Nation	Total points	SP		FS	
1	Daisuke Takahashi	Japan	257.70	1	89.30	1	168.40
2	Patrick Chan	Canada	247.22	2	87.80	2	159.42
3	Brian Joubert	France	241.74	3	87.70	4	154.04
4	Michal Březina	Czech Republic	236.06	5	81.75	3	154.31
5	Jeremy Abbott	United States	232.10	6	81.05	6	151.05
6	Adam Rippon	United States	231.47	7	80.11	5	151.36
7	Samuel Contesti	Italy	218.66	8	78.40	11	140.26
8	Kevin van der Perren	Belgium	218.43	10	73.55	9	144.88
9	Adrian Schultheiss	Sweden	218.26	12	72.35	7	145.91
10	Takahiko Kozuka	Japan	216.73	4	84.20	12	132.53
11	Kevin Reynolds	Canada	216.58	14	71.20	8	145.38
12	Javier Fernández	Spain	215.66	13	71.65	10	144.01
13	Denis Ten	Kazakhstan	202.46	9	77.40	15	125.06
14	Sergei Voronov	Russia	200.60	11	73.42	14	127.18
15	Florent Amodio	France	197.25	15	68.31	13	128.94
16	Anton Kovalevski	Ukraine	186.03	16	67.60	19	118.43
17	Guan Jinlin	China	182.68	19	59.45	16	123.23
18	Ryan Bradley	United States	179.24	21	56.10	17	123.14
19	Alexandr Kazakov	Belarus	175.57	24	54.24	18	121.33
20	Viktor Pfeifer	Austria	170.79	17	59.95	21	110.84
21	Abzal Rakimgaliev	Kazakhstan	166.20	22	54.60	20	111.60
22	Jamal Othman	Switzerland	156.41	20	57.35	22	99.06
23	Kim Min-seok	South Korea	149.31	18	59.80	24	89.51
24	Ari-Pekka Nurmenkari	Finland	148.34	23	54.45	23	93.89
Did not advance to free skating
25	Peter Liebers	Germany		25	54.09		
26	Pavel Kaška	Czech Republic		26	50.55		
27	Kevin Alves	Brazil		27	50.28		
28	Nobunari Oda	Japan		28	50.25		
29	Boris Martinec	Croatia		29	50.10		
30	Matthew Parr	United Kingdom		30	49.31		
31	Peter Reitmayer	Slovakia		31	48.72		
32	Zoltán Kelemen	Romania		32	46.94		
33	Damjan Ostojič	Bosnia and Herzegovina		33	45.30		
34	Andrew Huertas	Puerto Rico		34	45.09		
35	Maciej Cieplucha	Poland		35	44.30		
36	Viktor Romanenkov	Estonia		36	44.17		
37	Stephen Li-Chung Kuo	Chinese Taipei		37	44.15		
38	Saulius Ambrulevičius	Lithuania		38	42.37		
39	Mark Webster	Australia		39	42.30		
40	Georgi Kenchadze	Bulgaria		40	42.09		
41	Tigran Vardanjan	Hungary		41	39.30		
42	Sarkis Hayrapetyan	Armenia		42	39.02		
43	Maxim Shipov	Israel		43	38.26		
44	Humberto Contreras	Mexico		44	37.33		
45	Ali Demirboga	Turkey		45	36.39		
46	Girts Jekabsons	Latvia		46	31.79		
WD	Joffrey Bourdon	Montenegro					
WD	Artem Borodulin	Russia					

=== Ladies ===
Rank	Name	Nation	Total points	SP		FS	
1	Mao Asada	Japan	197.58	2	68.08	2	129.50
2	Kim Yuna	South Korea	190.79	7	60.30	1	130.49
3	Laura Lepistö	Finland	178.62	3	64.30	6	114.32
4	Miki Ando	Japan	177.82	11	55.78	3	122.04
5	Cynthia Phaneuf	Canada	177.54	8	59.50	4	118.04
6	Carolina Kostner	Italy	177.31	4	62.20	5	115.11
7	Mirai Nagasu	United States	175.48	1	70.40	11	105.08
8	Ksenia Makarova	Russia	169.64	5	62.06	8	107.58
9	Rachael Flatt	United States	167.44	6	60.88	9	106.56
10	Viktoria Helgesson	Sweden	161.79	9	56.32	10	105.47
11	Akiko Suzuki	Japan	160.04	20	48.36	7	111.68
12	Sarah Hecken	Germany	153.94	13	55.20	13	98.74
13	Alena Leonova	Russia	152.86	14	54.36	14	98.50
14	Jenna McCorkell	United Kingdom	150.90	15	52.12	12	98.78
15	Júlia Sebestyén	Hungary	147.66	10	56.10	15	91.56
16	Liu Yan	China	141.29	18	49.96	16	91.33
17	Cheltzie Lee	Australia	137.78	17	51.36	17	86.42
18	Elene Gedevanishvili	Georgia	137.33	12	55.26	21	82.07
19	Kiira Korpi	Finland	134.49	16	51.72	20	82.77
20	Sonia Lafuente	Spain	133.31	21	47.72	18	85.59
21	Jelena Glebova	Estonia	132.85	22	47.72	19	85.13
22	Kwak Min-jeong	South Korea	120.47	23	47.46	22	73.01
23	Anastasia Gimazetdinova	Uzbekistan	113.89	19	49.10	23	64.79
24	Manouk Gijsman	Netherlands	111.94	24	47.44	24	64.50
Did not advance to free skating
25	Ivana Reitmayerová	Slovakia		25	45.96		
26	Sarah Meier	Switzerland		26	45.06		
27	Tamar Katz	Israel		27	44.96		
28	Tuğba Karademir	Turkey		28	44.52		
29	Myriane Samson	Canada		29	44.20		
30	Kerstin Frank	Austria		30	43.80		
31	Victoria Muniz	Puerto Rico		31	41.08		
32	Bettina Heim	Switzerland		32	41.00		
33	Fleur Maxwell	Luxembourg		33	40.22		
34	Teodora Poštič	Slovenia		34	40.20		
35	Karina Johnson	Denmark		35	38.22		
36	Zanna Pugaca	Latvia		36	38.20		
37	Mirna Libric	Croatia		37	37.24		
38	Lauren Ko	Philippines		38	33.34		
39	Martina Bocek	Czech Republic		39	32.90		
40	Irina Movchan	Ukraine		40	32.60		
41	Sonia Radeva	Bulgaria		41	32.12		
42	Ana Cecilia Cantu	Mexico		42	31.88		
43	Crystal Kiang	Chinese Taipei		43	31.72		
44	Georgia Glastris	Greece		44	31.36		
45	Gwendoline Didier	France		45	29.32		
46	Marina Seeh	Serbia		46	28.32		
47	Clara Peters	Ireland		47	28.20		
48	Tamami Ono	Hong Kong		48	27.74		
49	Abigail Pietersen	South Africa		49	25.76		
50	Charissa Tansomboon	Thailand		50	25.22		
51	Sabina Paquier	Romania		51	24.42		
52	Yoniko Eva Washington	India		52	24.24		
53	Beatrice Rozinskaite	Lithuania		53	23.68		
WD	Isabelle Pieman	Belgium					
WD	Sonja Mugoša	Montenegro					

=== Pairs ===
Rank	Name	Nation	Total points	SP		FS	
1	Pang Qing / Tong Jian	China	211.39	1	75.28	1	136.11
2	Aliona Savchenko / Robin Szolkowy	Germany	204.74	3	69.52	2	135.22
3	Yuko Kavaguti / Alexander Smirnov	Russia	203.79	2	73.12	3	130.67
4	Maria Mukhortova / Maxim Trankov	Russia	197.39	4	69.48	4	127.91
5	Zhang Dan / Zhang Hao	China	195.78	5	69.20	5	126.58
6	Jessica Dubé / Bryce Davison	Canada	177.07	8	59.36	6	117.71
7	Caydee Denney / Jeremy Barrett	United States	172.47	6	60.52	8	111.95
8	Vera Bazarova / Yuri Larionov	Russia	172.04	7	59.78	7	112.26
9	Amanda Evora / Mark Ladwig	United States	165.96	9	57.74	9	108.22
10	Anabelle Langlois / Cody Hay	Canada	154.72	12	54.40	10	100.32
11	Stefania Berton / Ondřej Hotárek	Italy	149.78	11	54.58	11	95.20
12	Vanessa James / Yannick Bonheur	France	146.58	10	55.60	13	90.98
13	Anaïs Morand / Antoine Dorsaz	Switzerland	144.46	13	53.70	14	90.76
14	Maylin Hausch / Daniel Wende	Germany	142.98	14	49.74	12	93.24
15	Joanna Sulej / Mateusz Chruściński	Poland	138.26	15	48.14	15	90.12
16	Stacey Kemp / David King	United Kingdom	132.87	16	45.14	16	87.73
Did not advance to free skating
17	Dong Huibo / Wu Yiming	China		17	43.08		
18	Maria Sergejeva / Ilja Glebov	Estonia		18	41.94		
19	Lubov Bakirova / Mikalai Kamianchuk	Belarus		19	41.44		
20	Amanda Sunyoto-Yang / Darryll Sulindro-Yang	Chinese Taipei		20	41.28		
21	Jessica Crenshaw / Chad Tsagris	Greece		21	40.36		
22	Ekaterina Kostenko / Roman Talan	Ukraine		22	39.18		
23	Nina Ivanova / Filip Zalevski	Bulgaria		23	36.84		
24	Gabriela Čermanová / Martin Hanulák	Slovakia		24	35.18		
25	Danielle Montalbano / Evgeni Krasnopolski	Israel		25	32.02		

=== Ice dancing ===
Rank	Name	Nation	Total points	CD		OD		FD	
1	Tessa Virtue / Scott Moir	Canada	224.43	1	44.13	1	70.27	2	110.03
2	Meryl Davis / Charlie White	United States	223.03	2	43.25	2	69.29	1	110.49
3	Federica Faiella / Massimo Scali	Italy	197.85	3	40.85	3	59.16	4	97.84
4	Nathalie Péchalat / Fabian Bourzat	France	194.39	4	37.75	4	58.55	3	98.09
5	Sinead Kerr / John Kerr	United Kingdom	189.11	6	37.56	5	58.23	5	93.32
6	Alexandra Zaretsky / Roman Zaretsky	Israel	181.26	8	33.79	6	56.13	6	91.34
7	Vanessa Crone / Paul Poirier	Canada	180.30	9	33.32	7	55.76	7	91.22
8	Ekaterina Bobrova / Dmitri Soloviev	Russia	177.23	11	32.43	8	55.04	8	89.76
9	Emily Samuelson / Evan Bates	United States	168.77	10	32.61	10	52.79	10	83.37
10	Nóra Hoffmann / Maxim Zavozin	Hungary	166.90	13	31.47	11	51.91	9	83.52
11	Anna Cappellini / Luca Lanotte	Italy	164.52	7	34.05	12	51.40	14	79.07
12	Pernelle Carron / Lloyd Jones	France	161.86	15	30.55	13	50.52	12	80.79
13	Ekaterina Rubleva / Ivan Shefer	Russia	161.20	16	30.53	16	48.77	11	81.90
14	Kimberly Navarro / Brent Bommentre	United States	159.68	14	31.36	15	50.33	15	77.99
15	Cathy Reed / Chris Reed	Japan	154.93	23	24.78	14	50.41	13	79.74
16	Lucie Myslivečková / Matěj Novák	Czech Republic	147.93	18	26.95	17	46.07	17	74.91
17	Caitlin Mallory / Kristjan Rand	Estonia	147.39	20	26.62	21	43.77	16	77.00
18	Yu Xiaoyang / Wang Chen	China	142.80	17	28.42	19	44.59	19	69.79
19	Kira Geil / Dmitri Matsjuk	Austria	142.49	19	26.69	18	44.88	18	70.92
WD	Jana Khokhlova / Sergei Novitski	Russia	91.98	5	37.70	9	54.28	WD	
Did not advance to free dance
21	Allison Reed / Otar Japaridze	Georgia	69.42	22	26.07	22	43.35		
22	Carolina Hermann / Daniel Hermann	Germany	69.17	21	26.36	23	42.81		
23	Christina Chitwood / Mark Hanretty	United Kingdom	68.97	24	24.70	20	44.27		
24	Katelyn Good / Nikolaj Sorensen	Denmark	63.55	25	22.56	24	40.99		
25	Danielle O'Brien / Gregory Merriman	Australia	59.28	26	21.07	25	38.21		
26	Jenette Maitz / Alper Uçar	Turkey	49.50	27	17.36	26	32.14		
WD	Anna Zadorozhniuk / Sergei Verbillo	Ukraine		12	31.66				

== Prize money ==
	Prize money (US$)	
Placement	Men's / Ladies' singles	Pairs / Ice dancers
1st	45,000	67,500
2nd	27,000	40,500
3rd	18,000	27,000
4th	13,000	19,500
5th	10,000	15,000
6th	7,000	10,500
7th	6,000	9,000
8th	5,000	7,500
9th	3,500	5,250
10th	3,000	4,500
11th	2,500	3,750
12th	2,000	3,000
Pairs and ice dancing couples split the amount. Total prize money: US$710,000.

== Other sources ==
- "World Figure Skating Championships 2010 ANNOUNCEMENT". Archived from the original on 18 August 2011.
