= Vanessa Crone =

Canadian ice dancer

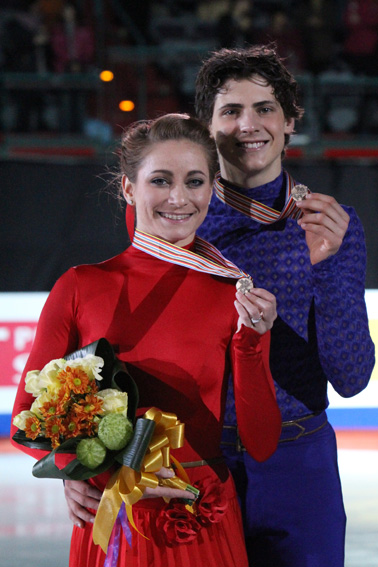
- Vanessa Crone and Paul Poirier in 2011

Personal information
- Born: October 29, 1990 (age 35) Aurora, Ontario, Canada
- Home town: Newmarket, Ontario
- Height: 1.60 m (5 ft 3 in)

Figure skating career
- Country: Canada
- Discipline: Ice dance
- Skating club: Scarboro Figure Skating Club
- Began skating: 1995
- Retired: 2026
Four Continents Championships
Bronze medal – third place	2011 Taipei	Ice dance
Grand Prix Final
Bronze medal – third place	2010–11 Beijing	Ice dance
Canadian Championships
Gold medal – first place	2011 Victoria	Ice dance
Silver medal – second place	2009 Saskatoon	Ice dance
Silver medal – second place	2010 London	Ice dance
World Junior Championships
Silver medal – second place	2008 Sofia	Ice dance

Vanessa Crone (born October 29, 1990) is a Canadian former competitive ice dancer. She skated with Paul Poirier from 2001 to 2011, becoming the 2010 Grand Prix Final bronze medallist, 2011 Four Continents bronze medallist, 2008 World Junior silver medallist, and 2011 Canadian national champion.

== Personal life ==
Vanessa Crone was born on October 29, 1990, in Aurora, Ontario. She competed in track and field in addition to figure skating.

== Career ==
Early in her career, Crone also competed in single skating, and pair skating with Poirier. She and Poirier began skating together in May 2001. They won the silver medal at the 2008 World Junior Championships.

Crone and Poirier won silver at 2008 Skate Canada, their first senior Grand Prix event, and placed fourth in their second event. The next season they claimed the bronze at 2009 NHK Trophy. At the 2010 Canadian Championships, they were nominated to represent Canada at the 2010 Winter Olympics. They finished 7th at the 2010 World Championships.

Crone and Poirier began the 2010–2011 season by capturing gold at 2010 Skate Canada International ahead of Sinead Kerr and John Kerr who had a fall in the free dance. At 2010 Skate America, Poirier fell in the free dance but their score was enough for the silver behind Meryl Davis and Charlie White, both of whom fell, and ahead of Maia Shibutani and Alex Shibutani with no falls. Their results qualified them for the 2010–2011 Grand Prix Final where they won the bronze medal. They finished 10th at the 2011 World Championships.

On June 2, 2011, Crone and Poirier announced the end of their ten-year partnership. Crone confirmed she would like to continue competing and was looking for a new partner.

In 2012, Crone teamed up with Danish ice dancer Nikolaj Sorensen, with whom she planned to compete for Canada, but they soon parted ways. In November, Crone said that she was still searching for a partner to continue her competitive career. She teaches skating in the Toronto area, working with both figure skaters and hockey players.

== Programs ==
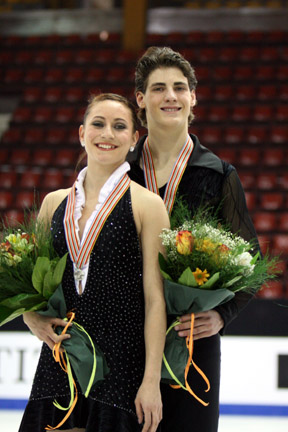
Vanessa Crone and Paul Poirier in 2008

(with Poirier)

Season	Short dance	Free dance	Exhibition
2010–11	Fallin' by Alicia Keys	"Eleanor Rigby" by John Lennon and Paul McCartney performed by Joshua Bell choreo. by Christopher Dean	The Best Things Happen While You're Dancing by Danny Kaye
	Original dance		
2009–10	En Malaga performed by Roger Scannura	Nocturne by Paul Swartz performed by Lucia Micarelli; Bohemian Rhapsody by Queen	Gravity by John Mayer
2008–09	Slow Rag: Solace; Ragtime Two-step: The Entertainer by Scott Joplin	Doce de Coco by Jacob do Bandolim	Valse lente by Artango
2007–08	Blue Kerchief by Jerzy Petersburski; Gypsy by Boutouk	A Los Amigos by A. Pontier and F. Silva	Gravity by John Mayer
2006–07	Tango	Capone by Ronan Hardiman	

== Competitive highlights ==
=== Ice dance with Paul Poirier ===
- GP – Event of the ISU Grand Prix Series
- JGP – Event of the ISU Junior Grand Prix Series

Competition placements at junior level
Season	2005–06	2006–07	2007–08
World Junior Championships		9th	2nd
JGP Final			4th
JGP Andorra	7th		
JGP Chinese Taipei		5th	
JGP Croatia			1st
JGP Norway		3rd	
JGP Romania			1st
Canadian Championships	6th	1st	

Competition placements at senior level
Season	2007–08	2008–09	2009–10	2010–11
Winter Olympics			14th	
World Championships		12th	7th	10th
Four Continents		4th		3rd
GP Final			6th	3rd
GP NHK Trophy			3rd	
GP Rostelecom Cup			4th	
GP Skate America				2nd
GP Skate Canada		2nd		1st
GP Trophée Éric Bompard		4th		
Canadian Championships	4th	2nd	2nd	1st

=== Single skating ===
Competition placements at junior level
Season	2007–08
Canadian Championships	13th
