= Kwak Min-jeong =

South Korean figure skater (born 1994)

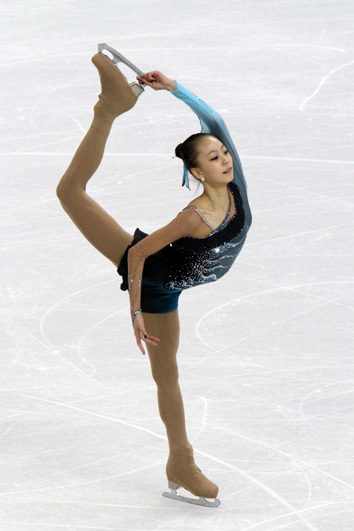
- Kwak during her free program at the 2010 Winter Olympics.

Personal information
- Full name: Kwak Min-jeong
- Born: January 23, 1994 (age 32) Seoul, South Korea
- Home town: Anyang, Gyeonggi
- Height: 1.62 m (5 ft 4 in)

Figure skating career
- Country: South Korea
- Coach: Shin Hea-sook
- Skating club: Ewha Womans University
- Began skating: 2001
- Retired: 2014
Medal record
Representing South Korea
Figure skating: Ladies' singles
Asian Winter Games
| Bronze medal – third place | 2011 Astana-Almaty | Ladies' singles |
South Korean Championships
| Silver medal – second place | 2010 Seoul | Ladies' singles |
| Bronze medal – third place | 2011 Seoul | Ladies' singles |

- Kwak Min-jeong
- Hangul: 곽민정
- Hanja: 郭珉整
- RR: Gwak Minjeong
- MR: Kwak Minjŏng

Kwak Min-jeong (born January 23, 1994) is a South Korean former competitive figure skater. She is the 2011 South Korean bronze medalist, the 2010 South Korean silver medalist and the 2009 Junior national champion. Kwak was also a member of the South Korean Olympic Team at the 2010 Winter Olympics, where she placed 13th in the ladies' event.

== Personal life ==
Kwak Min-jeong was born on January 23, 1994, in Seoul, South Korea. She married basketball player Moon Seong-gon in May 2021.

== Career ==
Kwak began skating in 2001.

=== 2007–08 season ===
In the 2007–08 season she was age-eligible to compete in Junior competitions, so she competed at the 2007–08 ISU Junior Grand Prix, placing 10th at the event in Tallinn with 98.77 points and 13th at the event in England with 103.89. She then competed at the South Korean Championships at the Junior level, where she came in fifth position.

=== 2008–09 season ===
In the 2008–09 season, she received two assignments to the 2008–09 ISU Junior Grand Prix. She won the bronze medal at the event in Mexico scoring 117.42 points but finished 13th at her competition in England, earning 106.05. She competed at the South Korean Championships again as a Junior, and won the gold medal with 114.89 points, placing first in both the short program and the free skating. She was selected to compete at the 2009 World Junior Championships, and with 103.69 she finished 22nd overall.

=== 2009–10 season: Vancouver Olympics ===
In the 2009–10 season, Kwak remained in the ISU Junior Grand Prix and competed in two events. She placed 11th in the first one held in the United States with 106.30 points. She went on to place 11th again with 108.21 at her second event, which took place in Croatia.

She was selected to compete at the 2010 Four Continents Championships in Jeonju, South Korea, her first Senior international competition. She placed seventh in the short program and fourth in the free skate to end in sixth position earning 154.71 points. Kwak was also chosen to be a member of the South Korean Olympic Team.

Before the Olympics she moved to Toronto, Ontario, Canada, and trained with Brian Orser, the 1984 and 1988 Olympic silver medalist. At the 2010 Winter Olympics, held in Vancouver, British Columbia, Canada, where she placed 13th with 155.53 points. She went on to compete at the 2010 World Championships in Turin, Italy, where she was in 22nd position after getting 120.47 points overall.

Her collaboration with Orser ended in August 2010.

=== 2010–11 season ===
In the 2010–11 season, Kwak moved to the senior ISU Grand Prix. Her assignments in the 2010–11 ISU Grand Prix season were the 2010 Cup of China and the 2010 Skate America.

At the 2010 Cup of China, she placed ninth in the short program with 38.83 points and also ninth in the free skate with 75.15. Overall, she placed ninth scoring 113.98 points. At the 2010 Skate America, she came tenth in the short program earning 44.41 points, and eleventh in the free skate with 80.80. She had a total of 125.21 points and finished eleventh.

She competed at the 2011 South Korean Championships, where she won the short program with 50.48 points. She placed third in the free skate earning 91.78 and won the bronze medal. She was selected to compete at the 2011 Four Continents and 2011 World Championships. At the 2011 Four Continents Figure Skating Championships she placed 8th in both skates finishing overall in 8th place. At the 2011 World Figure Skating Championships she placed 15th in the ladies qualifying round failing to advance to the short.

=== 2011–12 season ===
At the 2012 South Korean Championships she placed 8th in the short program falling on two of her jump elements to earn 38.98 points. In the free skate she placed 6th with 84.46 to climb up to 6th overall. Later that year, Kwak competed at the 2012 Four Continents Championships where she placed 10th. She has been selected to compete at the 2012 World Championships and she placed 28th.

== Public life and endorsements ==
Kwak toured in the 2010 Festa On Ice, held in Seoul, South Korea and headlined by 2010 Olympic champion ladies champion and her training mate Kim Yuna. She joined Kim in another ice show, the All That Skate, on July 23–25, 2010 in Goyang, South Korea, alongside other skaters like Michelle Kwan, Sasha Cohen and Stéphane Lambiel.

== Coaching ==
Kwak has been coaching Eunsoo Lim since the 2021-22 season.

== Programs ==
| Season | Short program | Free skating | Exhibition |
|---|---|---|---|
| 2011–2012 | East of Eden by Lee Holdridge choreo. by Yea-Ji Shin | Gaîté Parisienne by Jacques Offenbach choreo. by David Wilson; Caprice Bohemien Op.12 by Sergei Rachmaninoff choreo. by David Wilson | The Truth Is by Charice; Don't Rain on My Parade (from Glee) choreo. by Jeffrey Buttle |
| 2010–2011 | Canon in D major by Johann Pachelbel choreo. by David Wilson | Caprice Bohemien Op.12 by Sergei Rachmaninoff choreo. by David Wilson | Get Right by Jennifer Lopez choreo. by Shin Yea-Ji; Don't Rain on My Parade (from Glee) choreo. by Jeffrey Buttle |
| 2009–2010 | Murder on the Orient Express by Richard Rodney Bennett choreo. by Kim Se Yol | Les Misérables by Claude-Michel Schönberg choreo. by Kim Se Yol | The Voice Within by Christina Aguilera choreo. by Shin Yea-Ji; Marshmallow by IU choreo. by Shin Yea-Ji; SuperGirl by Saving Jane choreo. by Tuğba Karademir |
| 2008–2009 | Blood Diamond by James Newton Howard choreo. by Henrik Walentin | Stradivarius by Edvin Marton choreo. by Henrik Walentin | Stupid Cupid performed by Mandy Moore; A Thousand Miles by Vanessa Carlton |
| 2007–2008 | Blood Diamond by James Newton Howard choreo. by Henrik Walentin | Stradivarius by Edvin Marton choreo. by Henrik Walentin | |

== Competitive highlights ==
GP: Grand Prix; JGP: Junior Grand Prix

International
| Event | 07–08 | 08–09 | 09–10 | 10–11 | 11–12 | 14–15 |
|---|---|---|---|---|---|---|
| Olympics | | | 13th | | | |
| Worlds | | | 22nd | 33rd | 28th | |
| Four Continents | | | 6th | 8th | 10th | |
| GP Cup of China | | | | 9th | | |
| GP Skate America | | | | 11th | | |
| Asian Games | | | | 3rd | | |
| Asian Trophy | | | | | 3rd | |
| Crystal Skate | | | | | | 3rd |
| New Zealand Games | | | | | 1st | |
International: Junior or novice
| Junior Worlds | | 22nd | | | | |
| JGP Croatia | | | 11th | | | |
| JGP Estonia | 10th | | | | | |
| JGP Mexico | | 3rd | | | | |
| JGP United Kingdom | 13th | 13th | | | | |
| JGP United States | | | 11th | | | |
| Asian Trophy | | 2nd J. | | | | |
National
| South Korean | 2nd J. | 1st J. | 2nd | 3rd | 6th | |
J. = Junior level

== Detailed results ==
2014–15 season
| Date | Event | Level | SP | FS | Total |
|---|---|---|---|---|---|
| October 21–26, 2014 | 2014 Crystal Skate of Romania | Senior | 2; 36.51 | 3; 66.42 | 3; 102.93 |
2011–12 season
| Date | Event | Level | SP | FS | Total |
| February 7–12, 2012 | 2012 Four Continents Championships | Senior | 9; 48.72 | 10; 81.80 | 10; 130.52 |
| January 6–8, 2012 | 2012 South Korean Championships | Senior | 8; 38.98 | 6; 84.46 | 6; 123.44 |
| August 22–26, 2011 | 2011 Asian Figure Skating Trophy | Senior | 3; 43.19 | 4; 71.71 | 3; 114.90 |
| August 11–13, 2011 | 2011 New Zealand Winter Games | Senior | 1; 42.82 | 1; 83.07 | 1; 125.89 |
2010–11 season
| Date | Event | Level | SP | FS | Total |
| April 25 – May 1, 2011 | 2011 World Championships | Senior | – – | 15 (QR); 67.75 | – – |
| February 15–, 2011 | 2011 Four Continents Championships | Senior | 8; 50.47 | 8; 96.68 | 8; 147.15 |
| February 3–5, 2011 | 2011 Asian Winter Games | Senior | 3; 52.65 | 3; 95.30 | 3; 147.95 |
| January 14–16, 2011 | 2011 South Korean Championships | Senior | 1; 50.48 | 3; 91.78 | 3; 142.26 |
| November 11–14, 2010 | 2010 Skate America | Senior | 10; 44.41 | 11; 80.80 | 11; 125.21 |
| November 5–7, 2010 | 2010 Cup of China | Senior | 9; 38.83 | 9; 75.15 | 9; 113.98 |
2009–10 season
| Date | Event | Level | SP | FS | Total |
| March 22–28, 2010 | 2010 World Championships | Senior | 23; 47.46 | 22; 73.01 | 22; 120.47 |
| February 14–27, 2010 | 2010 Winter Olympic | Senior | 16; 53.16 | 12; **102.37** | 13; **155.53** |
| January 25–31, 2010 | 2010 Four Continents Championships | Senior | 7; **53.68** | 4; 101.03 | 6; 154.71 |
| January 9–10, 2010 | 2010 South Korean Championships | Senior | 2; 46.23 | 2; 88.00 | 2; 134.23 |
| October 7–11, 2009 | 2009 ISU Junior Grand Prix, Croatia | Junior | 8; 41.08 | 12; 67.13 | 11; 108.21 |
| September 2–6, 2009 | 2009 ISU Junior Grand Prix, United States | Junior | 12; 38.49 | 11; 67.81 | 11; 106.30 |
2008–09 season
| Date | Event | Level | SP | FS | Total |
| February 21–28, 2009 | 2009 World Junior Championships | Junior | 24; 38.94 | 19; 64.75 | 22; 103.69 |
| January 9–11, 2009 | 2009 South Korean Championships | Junior | 1; 42.71 | 1; 72.18 | 1; 114.89 |
| October 15–18, 2008 | 2008 ISU Junior Grand Prix, United Kingdom | Junior | 14; 39.82 | 13; 66.23 | 13; 106.05 |
| September 10–14, 2008 | 2008 ISU Junior Grand Prix, Mexico | Junior | 4; 46.97 | 3; 70.45 | 3; 117.42 |
2007–08 season
| Date | Event | Level | SP | FS | Total |
| January 13–16, 2008 | 2008 South Korean Championships | Junior | 1; 42.71 | 2; 74.72 | 2; 117.43 |
| October 18–21, 2007 | 2007 ISU Junior Grand Prix, United Kingdom | Junior | 11; 42.44 | 13; 61.45 | 13; 103.89 |
| September 20–22, 2007 | 2007 ISU Junior Grand Prix, Estonia | Junior | 11; 37.06 | 10; 61.71 | 10; 98.77 |

- SP = Short program; FS = Free skating
- Personal bests highlighted in **bold**.

== Television appearances ==
- 2020: King of Mask Singer (MBC), contestant as "Lion Mask" (episode 275)
