= Zhang Yue (figure skater) =

Chinese pair skater (born 1993)

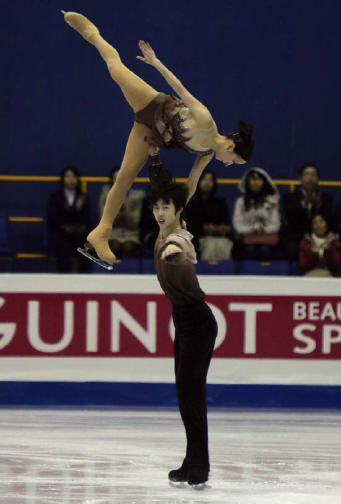
- Zhang/Wang perform a lift at the 2008–09 Junior Grand Prix Final

Personal information
- Born: January 27, 1993 (age 33) Qiqihar, Heilongjiang
- Height: 1.55 m (5 ft 1 in)

Figure skating career
- Country: China
- Skating club: Qiqihar Winter Sport Centre

Zhang Yue (simplified Chinese: 张悦; traditional Chinese: 張悅; pinyin: Zhāng Yuè; born January 27, 1993, in Qiqihar, Heilongjiang) is a Chinese pair skater. With former partner Wang Lei, she is the 2011 Winter Universiade bronze medalist and a two-time ISU Junior Grand Prix Final medalist, having won silver in 2008 and bronze in 2009.

== Career ==
Zhang teamed up with Wang Lei in 2006. In the 2007–08 season, the pair won two bronze medals on the Junior Grand Prix (JGP) circuit and qualified to their first JGP Final. They made their senior Grand Prix debut at the 2007 Cup of China before placing 8th at the JGP Final in Gdańsk, Poland. Following the retroactive disqualification of gold medalists Vera Bazarova / Yuri Larionov due to a positive doping sample from Larionov, Zhang/Wang moved up to 7th place. They concluded their season at the 2008 World Junior Championships in Sofia, Bulgaria. Ranked 4th in the short and 7th in the free, they finished 7th overall which, combined with Dong Huibo / Wu Yiming's bronze medal result, allowed China to send three pairs to the 2009 event.

In the 2008–09 JGP series, Zhang/Wang won a bronze medal in Belarus and finished 5th in Mexico. They were awarded the silver medal at the JGP Final in Goyang, South Korea. At the 2009 World Junior Championships in Sofia, the pair placed 7th in the short, 8th in the free, and 8th overall. At the 2009 World Championships in Los Angeles, they ranked 14th in the short, 16th in the free, and 16th overall.

Zhang/Wang won silver medals at their 2009–10 JGP assignments, in Belarus and Germany, and qualified to the JGP Final in Tokyo, where they took the bronze medal. They finished 6th at the 2010 Four Continents Championships in Jeonju.

The pair won the bronze medal at the 2011 Winter Universiade in Erzurum, Turkey. They placed 9th at the 2011 Four Continents in Taipei, 13th at the 2011 Worlds in Moscow, and 9th at the 2012 Four Continents in Colorado Springs, Colorado. Their partnership ended in 2012.

== Programs ==
(with Wang)

| Season | Short program | Free skating |
|---|---|---|
| 2011–12 | The Swan by Camille Saint-Saëns | Singin' in the Rain by Nacio Herb Brown |
| 2010–11 | Tango de los Exilados by Walter Taieb, Vanessa-Mae | Rhapsody on a Theme of Paganini by Sergei Rachmaninoff |
| 2009–10 | Rhapsody on a Theme of Paganini by Sergei Rachmaninoff | Coppélia by Léo Delibes |
| 2008–09 | The Way Old Friends Do by ABBA performed by Maksim Mrvica | Coppélia by Léo Delibes |
| 2007–08 | Sailor's Hornpipe; Anchor's Away; A Life on the Ocean Wave; Drunken Sailor | Coppélia by Léo Delibes |

== Competitive highlights ==
GP: Grand Prix; Junior Grand Prix

With Wang

International
| Event | 07–08 | 08–09 | 09–10 | 10–11 | 11–12 |
|---|---|---|---|---|---|
| Worlds | | 16th | | 13th | |
| Four Continents | | | 6th | 9th | 9th |
| GP Cup of China | 4th | 5th | | | |
| GP Skate America | | 8th | | | |
| GP NHK Trophy | | | | 8th | |
| Universiade | | | | 3rd | |
International: Junior
| Junior Worlds | 7th | 8th | | | |
| JGP Final | 7th | 2nd | 3rd | | |
| JGP Belarus | | 3rd | 2nd | | |
| JGP Estonia | 3rd | | | | |
| JGP Germany | | | 2nd | | |
| JGP Mexico | | 5th | | | |
| JGP United Kingdom | 3rd | | | | |
National
| Chinese Champ. | 6th | 2nd | 3rd | 3rd | |
