= 2010 Skate America =

- Type: Grand Prix
- Date: November 11 – 14
- Season: 2010–11
- Location: Portland, Oregon
- Host: U.S. Figure Skating
- Venue: Rose Garden Arena

Champions
- Men's singles: (Japan) Daisuke Takahashi
- Ladies' singles: (Japan) Kanako Murakami
- Pairs: (Germany) Aliona Savchenko / Robin Szolkowy
- Ice dance: (United States) Meryl Davis / Charlie White
- Previous: 2009 Skate America
- Next: 2011 Skate America
- Previous Grand Prix: 2010 Cup of China
- Next Grand Prix: 2010 Cup of Russia

The 2010 Skate America was the fourth event of six in the 2010–11 ISU Grand Prix of Figure Skating, a senior-level international invitational competition series. It was held at the Rose Garden Arena in Portland, Oregon on November 11–14. Medals were awarded in the disciplines of men's singles, ladies' singles, pair skating, and ice dancing. Skaters earned points toward qualifying for the 2010–11 Grand Prix Final.

== Schedule ==
All times are Pacific Standard Time.

- Thursday, November 11
  - 9:00 a.m. - 4:00 p.m. – Official practice
- Friday, November 12
  - 9:00 a.m. - 3:00 p.m. – Official practice
  - 7:00 p.m. – Pairs' short program & Men's short program (Session 1)
- Saturday, November 13
  - 8:00 a.m. - 1:30 p.m. – Official practice
  - 2:00 p.m. – Short dance & Ladies' short program (Session 2)
  - 7:00 p.m. – Men's free skating & Pairs' free skating (Session 3)
- Sunday, November 14
  - 11:00 a.m. – Ladies' free skating & Free dance (Session 4)
  - 5:00 p.m. – Skating spectacular

== Results ==
=== Men ===
Rank	Name	Nation	Total points	SP		FS	
1	Daisuke Takahashi	Japan	227.07	2	78.12	1	148.95
2	Nobunari Oda	Japan	226.09	1	79.28	2	146.81
3	Armin Mahbanoozadeh	United States	211.17	4	67.61	3	143.56
4	Adam Rippon	United States	203.12	3	73.94	7	129.18
5	Daisuke Murakami	Japan	203.00	5	67.01	4	135.99
6	Kevin van der Perren	Belgium	194.63	8	62.22	5	132.41
7	Adrian Schultheiss	Sweden	188.20	7	63.71	9	124.49
8	Shawn Sawyer	Canada	186.62	11	56.94	6	129.68
9	Stephen Carriere	United States	184.20	10	59.14	8	125.06
10	Song Nan	China	180.10	9	62.21	10	117.89
11	Denis Ten	Kazakhstan	176.11	6	64.50	11	111.61
12	Viktor Pfeifer	Austria	162.47	12	55.01	12	107.46

=== Ladies ===
Rank	Name	Nation	Total points	SP		FS	
1	Kanako Murakami	Japan	164.93	2	54.75	2	110.18
2	Rachael Flatt	United States	162.86	4	51.02	1	111.84
3	Carolina Kostner	Italy	154.87	1	60.28	6	94.59
4	Joshi Helgesson	Sweden	146.90	3	51.17	5	95.73
5	Amélie Lacoste	Canada	146.68	6	50.55	4	96.13
6	Viktoria Helgesson	Sweden	142.26	12	41.91	3	100.35
7	Elene Gedevanishvili	Georgia	139.36	8	45.27	7	94.09
8	Maé Bérénice Méité	France	137.05	7	48.27	8	88.78
9	Caroline Zhang	United States	132.49	5	50.66	10	81.83
10	Jenna McCorkell	United Kingdom	127.76	11	42.87	9	84.89
11	Kwak Min-jeong	South Korea	125.21	10	44.41	11	80.80
12	Alexe Gilles	United States	122.46	9	44.86	12	77.60

=== Pairs ===
Rank	Name	Nation	Total points	SP		FS	
1	Aliona Savchenko / Robin Szolkowy	Germany	197.70	1	63.99	1	133.71
2	Kirsten Moore-Towers / Dylan Moscovitch	Canada	175.48	2	61.64	2	113.84
3	Sui Wenjing / Han Cong	China	170.07	4	57.53	3	112.54
4	Caydee Denney / Jeremy Barrett	United States	166.42	3	58.49	4	107.93
5	Ksenia Stolbova / Fedor Klimov	Russia	159.49	5	53.73	6	105.76
6	Marissa Castelli / Simon Shnapir	United States	153.33	7	47.24	5	106.09
7	Felicia Zhang / Taylor Toth	United States	126.70	6	48.13	7	78.57
8	Stacey Kemp / David King	United Kingdom	115.92	8	42.00	8	73.92

=== Ice dancing ===
Rank	Name	Nation	Total points	SD		FD	
1	Meryl Davis / Charlie White	United States	156.68	1	63.62	1	93.06
2	Vanessa Crone / Paul Poirier	Canada	149.08	2	60.41	2	88.67
3	Maia Shibutani / Alex Shibutani	United States	144.81	4	56.46	3	88.35
4	Kaitlyn Weaver / Andrew Poje	Canada	142.34	3	59.48	4	82.86
5	Ekaterina Riazanova / Ilia Tkachenko	Russia	137.14	5	55.52	5	81.62
6	Lynn Kriengkrairut / Logan Giulietti-Schmitt	United States	130.72	6	52.13	6	78.59
7	Cathy Reed / Chris Reed	Japan	113.39	8	44.40	7	68.99
8	Penny Coomes / Nicholas Buckland	United Kingdom	111.29	7	49.43	8	61.86
9	Stefanie Frohberg / Tim Giesen	Germany	104.18	9	44.03	9	60.15
