= Amélie Lacoste =

Canadian figure skater

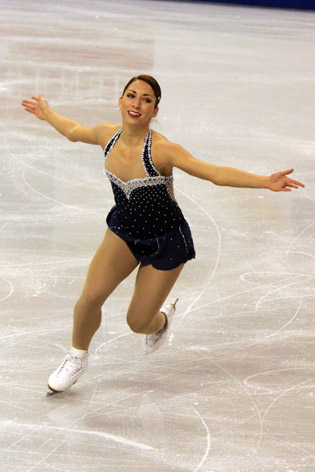
- Lacoste in 2009

Personal information
- Born: December 17, 1988 (age 37) Montreal, Quebec
- Height: 1.58 m (5 ft 2 in)

Figure skating career
- Country: Canada
- Skating club: CPA du Roussillon
- Began skating: 1993
- Retired: May 2014
Medal record
Representing Canada
Figure skating: Women's singles
World Team Trophy
Bronze medal – third place	2012 Tokyo	Team

Amélie Lacoste (born December 17, 1988) is a Canadian former competitive figure skater. She is the 2010 Skate Canada International bronze medallist and the 2012 Canadian national champion. Her highest placement at an ISU Championship was 7th at the 2010 and 2012 Four Continents Championships.

== Career ==
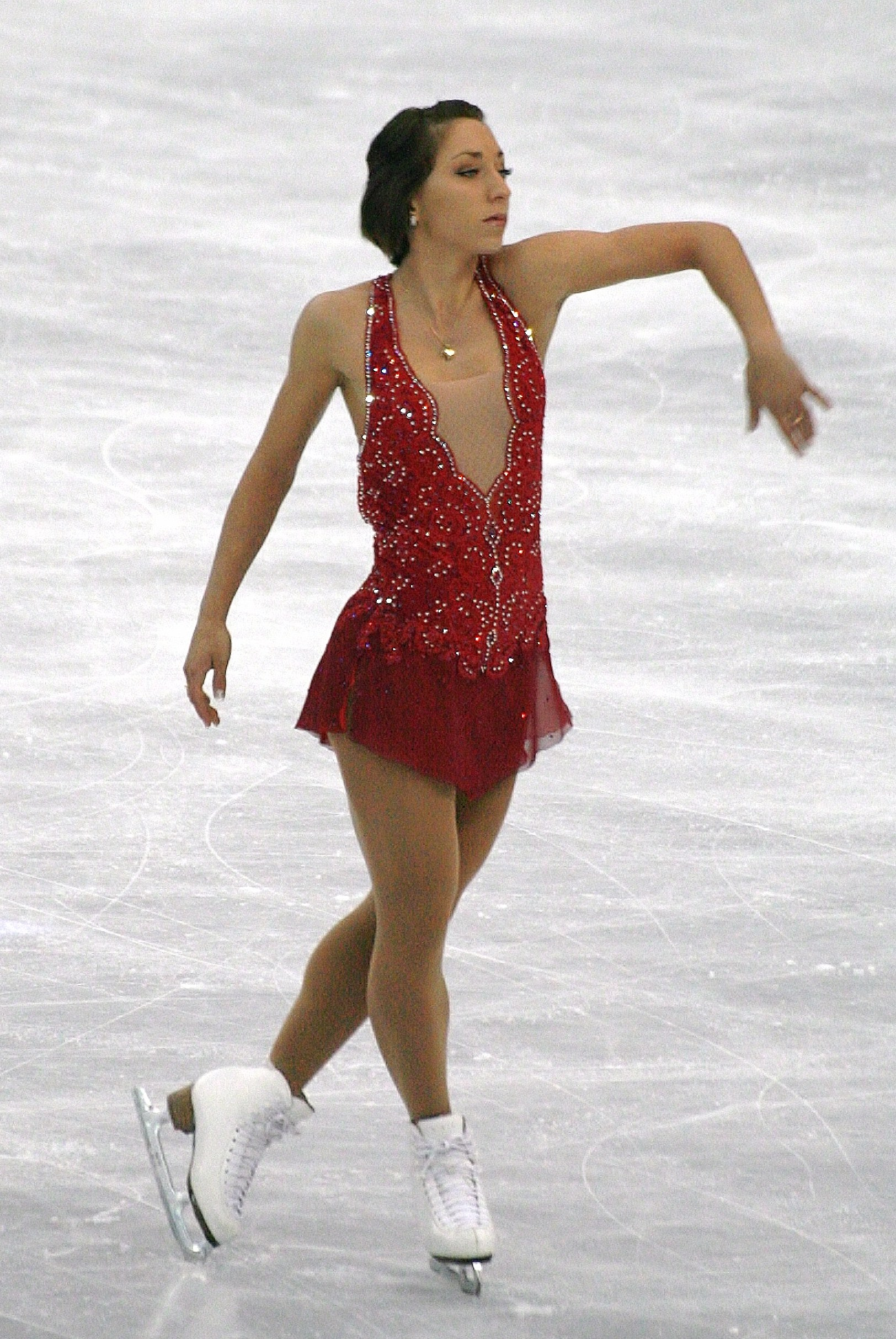
Lacoste at the 2012 World Championships

Lacoste won the novice national title in 2003 and the junior national title in 2005. She also competed on the Junior Grand Prix series. She finished 5th in her senior national debut at the 2006 Canadian Championships. She briefly tried pair skating in 2007.

Lacoste won the bronze medal at the 2009 Canadian Championships. She was assigned to her first Four Continents Championships where she finished 10th. The following season, she made her Grand Prix debut, appearing at 2009 Skate Canada International and 2009 Cup of Russia. She finished 7th at the 2010 Four Continents.

Lacoste won the bronze at 2010 Skate Canada International and placed 5th at 2010 Skate America. She won a bronze medal at the 2011 Canadian Championships. She was named an alternate to the World Championships and was given her first berth to the event when Myriane Samson dropped out due to injury.

In 2012, Lacoste won the Canadian national title, defeating Cynthia Phaneuf by 1.57 points. Lacoste then earned a berth to her second World Championships when she placed 7th at the 2012 Four Continents, 0.18 ahead of Phaneuf. She finished 16th at the 2012 World Championships in Nice. Lacoste injured her right hip in autumn 2012.

In early October 2013, Lacoste moved to Colorado Springs, Colorado to be coached by Christy Krall and Damon Allen. She won the bronze medal at the 2014 Canadian Championships. In May 2014, she announced her retirement from competition.

== Programs ==
Season	Short program	Free skating
2013–14	The Feeling Begins by Peter Gabriel	Amélie by Yann Tiersen; La Valse d'Amélie; Les jours tristes; Comptine d'un autre été : L'après-midi; La Noyée
2012–13	The Feeling Begins by Peter Gabriel	Rhapsody in Blue by George Gershwin; Concerto in F by Newell Oler
2011–12	Satin Doll by Duke Ellington	Don't Cry For Me Argentina (from Evita) by Andrew Lloyd Webber performed by Pierre Porte
2010–11	Ojos Negros	Scheherazade by Nikolai Rimsky-Korsakov; The Sea and Sinbad's Ship; The Story of the Kalender Prince; The Young Prince and the Princess; Festival at Baghdad
2009–10	Otonal by Raúl Di Blasio	O mio babbino caro (from Gianni Schicchi) by Puccini
2008–09	Otonal by Raúl Di Blasio	Montoya; Frontera del Ensuenno; Gypsy (from "Viva Flamenco"); Luna Mora (from "Flamenco 7 – Pasion Flamenca Tango"); Jarcamora (from "Compania Talent Danza Flamenco"); Camindo Del Darro (from "Passion & Soul"); Title Theme (from "Girlfight")
2005–06	El Conquistador by Maxime Rodriguez	Romanza (Andante Nalinconico) by Nino Rota
2004–05	El Conquistador by Maxime Rodriguez	Piano Concerto No. 2 by Sergei Rachmaninoff

== Competitive highlights ==
GP: Grand Prix; JGP: Junior Grand Prix

International
Event	03–04	04–05	05–06	06–07	07–08	08–09	09–10	10–11	11–12	12–13	13–14
Worlds								16th	16th		
Four Continents		11th				10th	7th	9th	7th	9th	12th
GP Bompard											6th
GP Cup of China										6th	
GP Rostel. Cup							7th		8th		
GP Skate America								5th			
GP Skate Canada							6th	3rd	6th	8th	5th
U.S. Classic										3rd	5th
International: Junior, Novice
Junior Worlds		15th									
JGP Germany		7th									
JGP Japan			9th								
JGP Netherlands				12th							
JGP Poland	15th										
JGP Slovakia			5th								
JGP USA		4th									
National
Canadians	9th J.	1st J.	5th	WD	8th	3rd	5th	3rd	1st	4th	3rd
Team events
World Team; Trophy									3rd T 10th P		
WD: Withdrew; J. = Junior; T: Team result; P: Personal result. Medals awarded for team result only.
