= Geng Bingwa =

Chinese figure skater (born 1994)

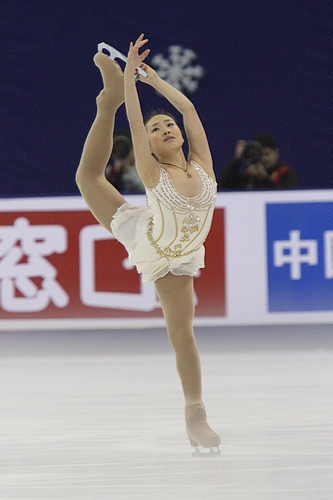
- 2011 Cup of China Geng Bingwa

Personal information
- Full name: Geng Bingwa
- Born: January 3, 1994 (age 32) Qiqihar, Heilongjiang, China
- Height: 1.57 m (5 ft 2 in)

Figure skating career
- Country: China
- Coach: Li Mingzhu; Li Chengjiang; Bao Li
- Skating club: Qiqihar SC

Geng Bingwa (Chinese: 耿冰娃; pinyin: Gěng Bīngwá; born January 3, 1994) is a Chinese figure skater. She won the silver medal in 2008 and 2011 at the Chinese Figure Skating Championships, and reached the free skate at five International Skating Union Championships.

== Personal life ==
Geng was born in Qiqihar, Heilongjiang. Her mother coaches figure skating and father formerly competed in ice hockey. Her name "Bingwa" means "ice baby" in Chinese.

In February 2011, Geng's age became the subject of controversy. Although her International Skating Union biography states she was born on January 3, 1994, a Chinese website suggests she was born on March 3, 1995.

== Career ==
Geng began skating at the age in 1998. Her international debut came at the 2008 World Junior Championships in Sofia, Bulgaria. Ranked 24th in the short program, she qualified for the free skate (17th) and finished 21st overall. The following season, she made her first and only appearance on the International Skating Union Junior Grand Prix series, placing 8th in Mexico. At the 2008 World Junior Championships, she placed 11th in the short, 21st in the free, and 18th overall.

Making her Grand Prix debut, Geng finished 11th at the 2009 Cup of China. The following season, she placed fifth at the 2010 Cup of China, 13th at the 2011 Four Continents Championships in Taipei, and 18th at the 2011 World Championships in Moscow.

Geng ranked 11th at the 2012 Four Continents in Colorado Springs, Colorado. She withdrew from the 2012 Cup of China after the short program and has made no international appearances since that event.

== Programs ==
Season	Short program	Free skating	Exhibition
2013–14	Canon	The Phantom of the Opera by Andrew Lloyd Webber	
2012–13	Scene d'amour by Francis Lai	Adagio in G minor for strings and organ by David Parry	
2011–12	The Umbrellas of Cherbourg by Michel Legrand choreo. by Jiang Hailan	Sylvia by Gabriel Yared choreo. by David Wilson	It's Oh So Quiet by Björk; Tell Him by Celine Dion and Barbra Streisand
2010–11	Just For You by Giovanni Marradi choreo. by Karen Kwan	Red Violin (Concierto de Aranjuez) performed by Ikuko Kawai choreo. by Karen Kwan	Wishing You Were Somehow Here Again (from The Phantom of the Opera) by Andrew Lloyd Webber
2009–10	Méditation (from Thaïs) by Jules Massenet choreo. by Karen Kwan	Introduction and Rondo Capriccioso by Camille Saint-Saëns choreo. by Karen Kwan	
2008–09	The Road Home by San Bao choreo. by Cao Xiaoming	Introduction and Rondo Capriccioso by Camille Saint-Saëns choreo. by Karen Kwan	
2007–08	Main Title Theme from The Last Emperor by David Byrne	Somewhere in Time by John Barry choreo. by Cao Xiaoming	

== Competitive highlights ==
GP: Grand Prix; JGP: Junior Grand Prix

International
Event	06–07	07–08	08–09	09–10	10–11	11–12	12–13	14–15
Worlds					18th			
Four Continents					13th	11th		
GP Cup of China				11th	5th	8th	WD	
Asian Games					5th			
Triglav Trophy						4th		
International: Junior
Junior Worlds		21st	18th					
JGP Mexico			8th					
National
Chinese Champ.	5th	2nd		4th	2nd			13th
Chinese NG			3rd			3rd		
WD: Withdrew

=== Detailed results ===
2012–13 season
Date	Event	SP	FS	Total
November 2–4, 2012	2012 ISU Grand Prix Cup of China	10; 36.53	–	–
2011–12 season
Date	Event	SP	FS	Total
April 4–8, 2012	2012 Triglav Trophy	7; 45.29	3; 87.40	4; 132.69
February 7–12, 2012	2012 Four Continents Championships	10; 46.98	11; 80.91	11; 127.89
January 4–6, 2012	12th Chinese National Winter Games	3; 54.90	4; 95.62	3; 150.58
November 6–8, 2011	2011 ISU Grand Prix Cup of China	6; 52.61	8; 89.48	8; 142.09
2010–11 season
Date	Event	SP	FS	Total
April 24 – May 1, 2011	2011 World Championships	19; 47.89	17; 92.89	18; 140.78
February 15–20, 2011	2011 Four Continents Championships	13; 39.20	16; 65.38	13; 104.58
February 3–5, 2011	2011 Asian Winter Games	5; 47.18	5; 93.86	5; 141.04
December 23–24, 2010	2010–11 Chinese Championships	3; 42.13	1; 101.95	2; 144.08
November 4–7, 2010	2010 ISU Grand Prix Cup of China	4; 51.09	4; 91.39	5; 142.48
2009–10 season
Date	Event	SP	FS	Total
Oct. 29 – Nov. 1, 2009	2009 ISU Grand Prix Cup of China	10; 47.64	11; 73.56	11; 121.20
September 3–5, 2009	2009–10 Chinese Championships	2; 50.01	5; 69.27	4; 119.28

2008–09 season
Date	Event	Level	SP	FS	Total
February 21–28, 2009	2009 World Junior Championships	Junior	11; 47.54	21; 64.17	18; 111.71
September 10–14, 2008	2008 Junior Grand Prix, Mexico	Junior	8; 37.96	6; 63.75	8; 101.71
2007–08 season
Date	Event	Level	SP	FS	Total
Feb. 25 – March 2, 2008	2008 World Junior Championships	Junior	24; 39.82	17; 68.15	21; 107.97
December 21–24, 2007	2007–08 Chinese Championships	Senior	2; 43.44	2; 83.72	2; 127.16
2006–07 season
Date	Event	Level	SP	FS	Total
December 27–30, 2006	2006–07 Chinese Championships	Senior	–	–	5 –
