= Ross Miner =

American figure skater and coach (born 1991)

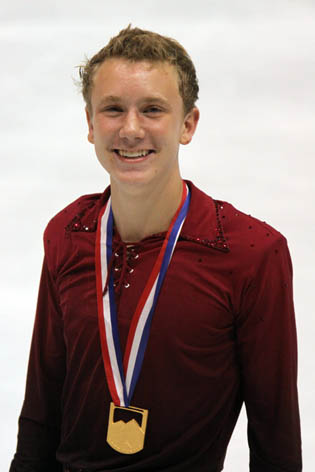
- Miner at the 2009 JGP United States

Personal information
- Born: January 24, 1991 (age 35) Burlington, Vermont, U.S.
- Home town: Boston, Massachusetts, U.S.
- Height: 5 ft 9 in (1.75 m)

Figure skating career
- Country: United States
- Discipline: Men's singles
- Began skating: 1995
- Retired: 2018
- Highest WS: 15th (2012–13)

Medal record
Four Continents Championships
| Bronze medal – third place | 2012 Colorado Springs | Singles |
U.S. Championships
| Silver medal – second place | 2013 Omaha | Singles |
| Silver medal – second place | 2018 San Jose | Singles |
| Bronze medal – third place | 2011 Greensboro | Singles |
| Bronze medal – third place | 2012 San Jose | Singles |
Junior Grand Prix Final
| Bronze medal – third place | 2009–10 Tokyo | Singles |

Ross Miner (born January 24, 1991) is an American skating coach and retired competitive figure skater. He is the 2012 Four Continents bronze medalist, 2009 JGP Final bronze medalist, 2013 and 2018 U.S. national silver medalist and 2009 U.S. junior champion. In 2021, Miner was suspended from coaching for six months by the United States Center for SafeSport, for sexual harassment.

== Personal life ==
Ross Miner was born in Burlington, Vermont. In addition to figure skating, he also played hockey until the age of 12. Miner moved from Williston, Vermont, to Watertown, Massachusetts, when he was 12. He takes on-line courses from the University of Missouri.

== Career ==
=== Early career ===
Ross Miner began skating at the age of three. When he was 12, he began training at the Skating Club of Boston. He had to relearn much from scratch as his jump technique was extremely poor at the beginning – underrotating even single Axels; nevertheless, Mark Mitchell and Peter Johansson agreed to coach him.

In the 2004–05 season, Miner competed on the Intermediate level. He won the bronze medal at his regional championship to qualify for the U.S. Junior Championships, where he placed eighth. He remained on the intermediate level during the following season. He won the silver medal at his regional championship to qualify for the U.S. Junior Championships, where he won the gold medal.

In the 2006–07 season, Miner moved up to the Novice level. He won his regional championship and then placed fifth at his sectional championship, missing qualifying for the 2007 U.S. Championships by one position.

In the 2007–08 season, Miner remained on the Novice level. He won his sectional championship to qualify for the 2008 U.S. Championships, where he won the silver medal. Following the U.S. Championships, Miner was assigned to the 2008 Gardena Spring Trophy, where he won the silver medal on the Junior level.

In the 2008–09 season, Miner moved up to the Junior level nationally. He won his sectional championships to qualify for the 2009 U.S. Championships. At Nationals, Miner won the short program and placed second in the free skate to win the gold medal overall.

Following the event, Miner was named to the team to the 2009 World Junior Championships, where he placed tenth.

Miner won the bronze medal at the 2009–10 Junior Grand Prix Final. He had qualified to compete at the senior level at the 2010 U.S. Nationals but suffered a high ankle sprain while practicing a triple Axel. He was forced to withdraw from the event and also missed the Junior Worlds that season.

=== Senior career ===
During the 2010–11 season, Miner finished ninth at 2010 NHK Trophy and seventh at 2010 Cup of China. He made his senior national debut at the 2011 U.S. Championships where he won the bronze medal. He was selected to compete at the 2011 World Championships, where he finished eleventh. During the off-season, he worked on a quad Salchow and shortening the lead time into his jumps.

Miner finished fifth at the 2012 Skate Canada International. At the 2012 NHK Trophy, he landed his first quad Salchow in competition and took the bronze medal. At the 2013 U.S. Championships, Miner finished second, behind champion Max Aaron.

Miner was ninth at the 2013 Skate Canada International. He withdrew from his other Grand Prix event, the 2013 Trophee Eric Bompard, due to a right ankle sprain. He was seventh at the 2014 U.S. Championships.

Miner began the 2014–15 season competing on the Challenger circuit, winning the silver medal at the 2014 US Classic and gold at the 2014 Autumn Classic. He was eighth at his lone Grand Prix assignment, the 2014 NHK Trophy, and finished sixth at the 2015 U.S. Championships.

Starting the 2015–16 season again at the U.S. Classic, Miner won the bronze medal. On the Grand Prix, Miner was seventh at Skate America before winning the bronze medal with personal best scores at the 2015 Rostelecom Cup. He was fifth at the 2016 U.S. Championships, but was nevertheless named to the American team for the 2016 Four Continents Championships, finishing fourteenth.

Miner was sixth at the 2016 U.S. Classic, before finishing twelfth at the 2016 Skate Canada International and ninth at the 2016 Cup of China. He was fifth at the 2017 U.S. Championships.

To begin what would be his final competitive season, Miner finished sixth at the Autumn Classic. He was given a second Challenger assignment, and placed fifth at the Finlandia Trophy. Given one Grand Prix assignment, he was sixth at the 2017 Skate America. In his final competition, Miner had a striking return to form at the 2018 U.S. Championships. Only sixth in the short program, he was second in the free skate, and took the silver medal. Despite his second-place finish, Miner was not named to the American team for the 2018 Winter Olympics in PyeongChang, with the second and third spots on the team going to bronze medalist Vincent Zhou and pewter medalist Adam Rippon. This selection process was controversial, and Miner's coach Mark Mitchell criticized the US Federation publicly.

=== Coaching ===
Following his retirement from competition, Miner worked as a figure skating coach in Boston. In 2021, Miner was suspended from coaching for six months by the United States Center for SafeSport for sexual harassment. On March 31, 2022, the United States Center for SafeSport suspended Miner for another three months.

== Programs ==
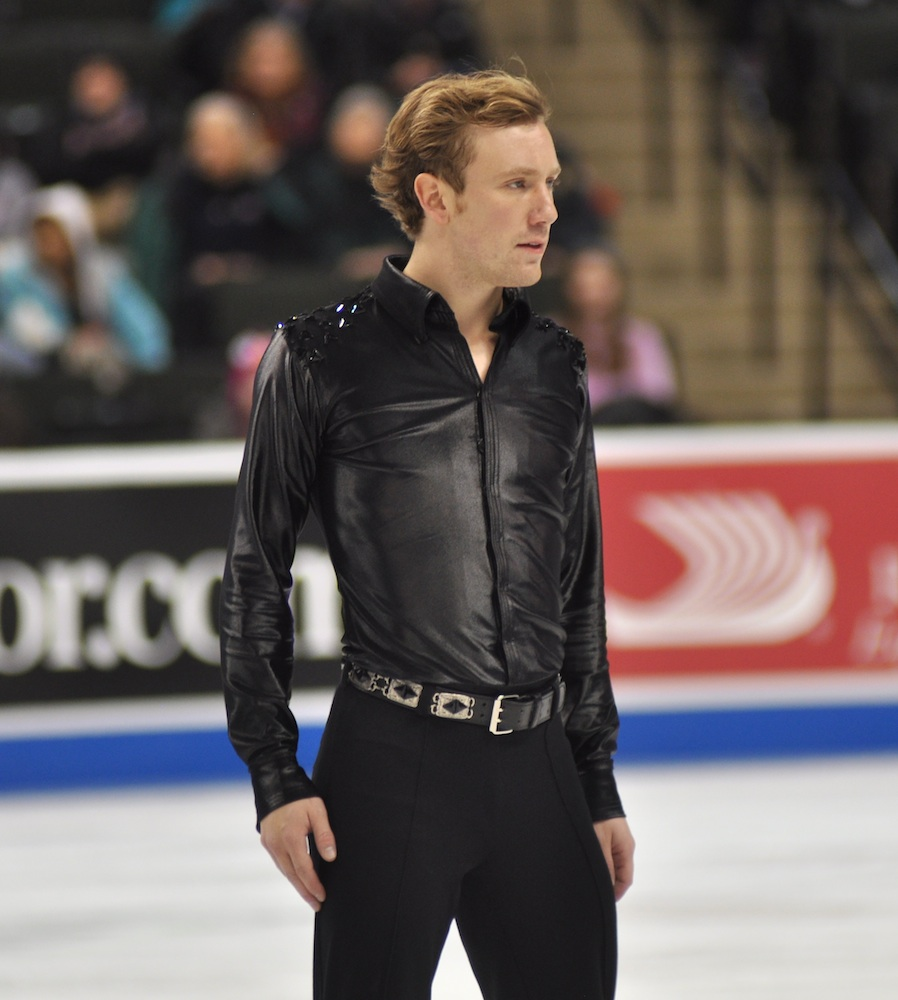
Miner at the 2016 U.S.Championships

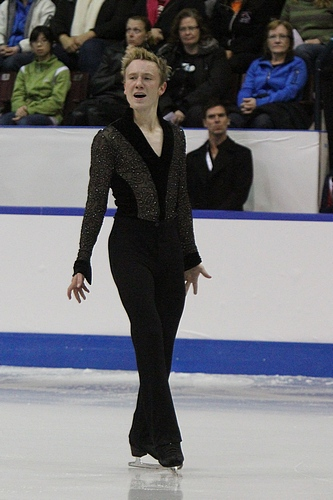
Miner at the 2011 Skate Canada

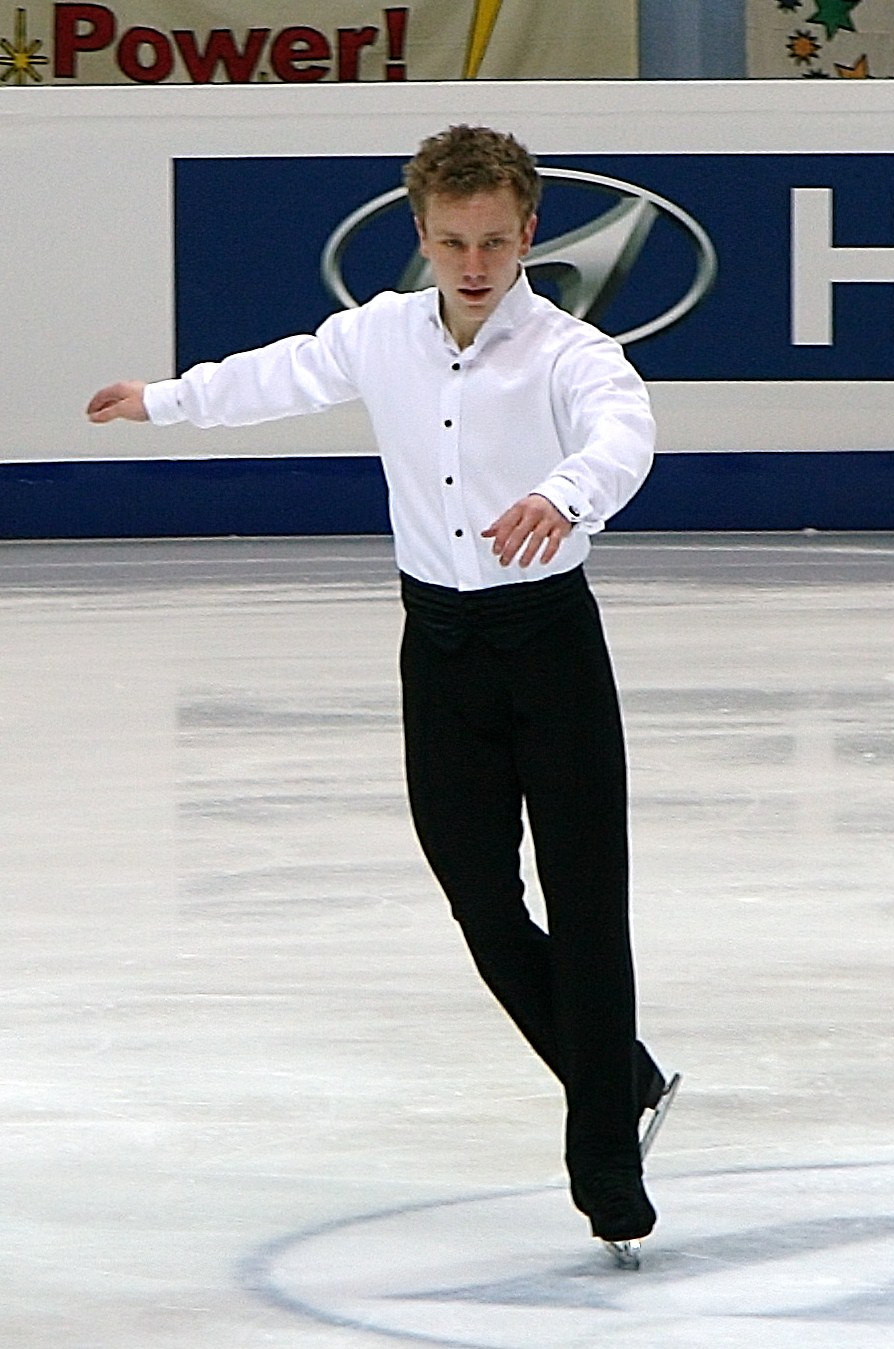
Miner at the 2011 World Championships

| Season | Short program | Free skating | Exhibition |
|---|---|---|---|
| 2016–2017 | New York State of Mind by Billy Joel | Queen medley: Somebody to Love; Love of my Life; Crazy Little Thing Called Love | |
| 2015–2016 | New York State of Mind by Billy Joel | Queen medley: Who Wants to Live Forever; Too Much Love Will Kill You choreo. by Lori Nichol | (Another Song) All Over Again by Justin Timberlake |
| 2014–2015 | The Way We Were by Marvin Hamlisch | Romanza by Andrea Bocelli | |
| 2013–2014 | The Way We Were by Marvin Hamlisch | Glory by Michael W. Smith | |
| 2012–2013 | Rhapsody on a Theme of Paganini by Sergei Rachmaninoff choreo. by Catarina Lindgren | Captain Blood by Erich Korngold choreo. by Tom Dickson | |
| 2011–2012 | Para Ti by Jorge Sanchez | The Untouchables by Ennio Morricone | |
| 2010–2011 | Salsa Mix (Para Ti) by Jorge Gomez | Casablanca: As Time Goes By by Max Steiner | Born to Run by Bruce Springsteen |
| 2009–2010 | A Carmen Fantasy for Trumpet and Orchestra; Carmen by Georges Bizet | Adiós Nonino; Libertango by Astor Piazzolla | |
| 2008–2009 | Bonanza by David Rose; Cotton Eye Joe by Rednex | I've Got Rhythm; Someone to Watch Over Me; Nice Work If You Can Get It by George Gershwin | Crazy Little Thing Called Love by Queen |
| 2007–2008 | Hawaii 5–0 by The Ventures; Wipe Out by The Surfaris | I've Got Rhythm; Someone to Watch Over Me; Nice Work If You Can Get It by George Gershwin | |

== Competitive highlights ==
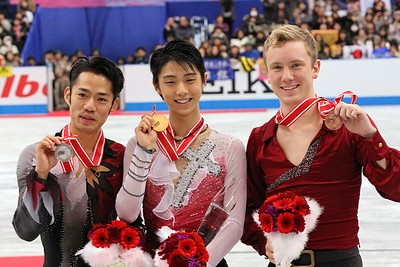
Miner at the 2012 NHK Trophy

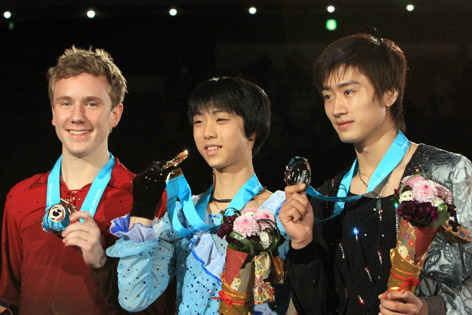
Miner at the 2009–10 Junior Grand Prix of Figure Skating Final

- GP – Event of the ISU Grand Prix Series
- JGP – Event of the ISU Junior Grand Prix Series
- CS – Event of the ISU Challenger Series
- WD – Withdrew from competition

Competition placements at senior level
| Season | 2010–11 | 2011–12 | 2012–13 | 2013–14 | 2014–15 | 2015–16 | 2016–17 | 2017–18 |
|---|---|---|---|---|---|---|---|---|
| World Championships | 11th | | 14th | | | | | |
| Four Continents Championships | | 3rd | 9th | | | 14th | | |
| U.S. Championships | 3rd | 3rd | 2nd | 7th | 6th | 5th | 5th | 2nd |
| GP Cup of China | 7th | | | | | | 9th | |
| GP NHK Trophy | 9th | 3rd | 3rd | | 7th | | | |
| GP Rostelecom Cup | | | | | | 3rd | | |
| GP Skate America | | | | | | 7th | | 6th |
| GP Skate Canada | | 6th | 5th | 9th | | | 12th | |
| CS Autumn Classic | | | | | 1st | | | 6th |
| CS Finlandia Trophy | | | | | | | | 5th |
| CS U.S. Classic | | | 3rd | | 2nd | 3rd | 6th | |
| Gardena Spring Trophy | | | | 2nd | | | | |
| Nepela Trophy | | | | 4th | | | | |

Competition placements at junior level
| Season | 2007–08 | 2008–09 | 2009–10 |
|---|---|---|---|
| World Junior Championships | | 10th | |
| Junior Grand Prix Final | | | 3rd |
| U.S. Championships | | 1st | |
| JGP Croatia | | | 2nd |
| JGP United States | | | 1st |
| Gardena Spring Trophy | 2nd | | |

== Detailed results ==
ISU personal best scores in the +3/-3 GOE System
| Segment | Type | Score | Event |
|---|---|---|---|
| Total | TSS | 248.92 | 2015 Rostelecom Cup |
| Short program | TSS | 85.36 | 2015 Rostelecom Cup |
| Short program | TES | 45.57 | 2015 Rostelecom Cup |
| Short program | PCS | 39.79 | 2015 Rostelecom Cup |
| Free skating | TSS | 163.56 | 2015 Rostelecom Cup |
| Free skating | TES | 86.74 | 2012 NHK Trophy |
| Free skating | PCS | 82.02 | 2017 CS Finlandia Trophy |

=== Senior level ===
Results in the 2010–11 season
| Date | Event | SP | | FS | | Total | |
| Date | Event | P | Score | P | Score | P | Score |
|---|---|---|---|---|---|---|---|
| Oct 21–24, 2010 | (Japan) 2010 NHK Trophy | 7 | 64.85 | 10 | 121.77 | 9 | 186.62 |
| Nov 5–7, 2010 | 2010 Cup of China | 6 | 67.10 | 8 | 130.03 | 7 | 197.13 |
| Jan 22–30, 2011 | (United States) 2011 U.S. Championships | 6 | 67.99 | 2 | 156.36 | 3 | 224.35 |
| Apr 24 – May 1, 2011 | (Russia) 2011 World Championships | 13 | 70.40 | 11 | 147.53 | 11 | 217.93 |

Results in the 2011–12 season
| Date | Event | SP | | FS | | Total | |
| Date | Event | P | Score | P | Score | P | Score |
|---|---|---|---|---|---|---|---|
| Oct 27–30, 2011 | 2011 Skate Canada International | 9 | 60.83 | 5 | 141.53 | 6 | 202.36 |
| Nov 11–13, 2011 | (Japan) 2011 NHK Trophy | 6 | 71.12 | 4 | 141.24 | 3 | 212.36 |
| Jan 22–29, 2012 | (United States) 2012 U.S. Championships | 4 | 78.90 | 3 | 151.42 | 3 | 230.32 |
| Feb 7–12, 2012 | (United States) 2012 Four Continents Championships | 6 | 76.89 | 4 | 146.34 | 3 | 223.23 |

Results in the 2012–13 season
| Date | Event | SP | | FS | | Total | |
| Date | Event | P | Score | P | Score | P | Score |
|---|---|---|---|---|---|---|---|
| Sep 13–16, 2012 | (United States) 2012 U.S. International Classic | 2 | 69.09 | 3 | 144.35 | 3 | 213.44 |
| Oct 26–28, 2012 | 2012 Skate Canada International | 8 | 69.41 | 4 | 144.19 | 5 | 213.60 |
| Nov 22–25, 2012 | (Japan) 2012 NHK Trophy | 4 | 73.41 | 3 | 161.96 | 3 | 235.37 |
| Jan 19–27, 2013 | (United States) 2013 U.S. Championships | 2 | 80.99 | 2 | 170.30 | 2 | 251.29 |
| Feb 8–11, 2013 | (Japan) 2013 Four Continents Championships | 9 | 74.01 | 7 | 140.35 | 9 | 214.36 |
| Mar 11–17, 2013 | (Canada) 2013 World Championships | 14 | 70.24 | 13 | 141.66 | 14 | 211.90 |

Results in the 2013–14 season
| Date | Event | SP | | FS | | Total | |
| Date | Event | P | Score | P | Score | P | Score |
|---|---|---|---|---|---|---|---|
| Oct 3–5, 2013 | (Slovakia) 2013 Ondrej Nepela Trophy | 3 | 74.28 | 4 | 136.59 | 4 | 210.87 |
| Oct 24–27, 2013 | 2013 Skate Canada International | 10 | 66.71 | 8 | 130.18 | 9 | 196.89 |
| Jan 5–12, 2014 | (United States) 2014 U.S. Championships | 8 | 71.94 | 6 | 152.87 | 7 | 224.81 |
| Mar 23–25, 2014 | (Italy) 2014 Gardena Spring Trophy | 2 | 71.14 | 2 | 138.94 | 2 | 210.08 |

Results in the 2014–15 season
| Date | Event | SP | | FS | | Total | |
| Date | Event | P | Score | P | Score | P | Score |
|---|---|---|---|---|---|---|---|
| Sep 11–14, 2014 | (United States) 2012 U.S. International Classic | 3 | 67.06 | 2 | 142.72 | 2 | 209.78 |
| Oct 15–16, 2014 | (Canada) 2014 CS Autumn Classic International | 1 | 80.24 | 1 | 147.02 | 1 | 227.26 |
| Nov 28–30, 2014 | (Japan) 2014 NHK Trophy | 10 | 63.36 | 7 | 142.00 | 7 | 205.36 |
| Jan 18–25, 2015 | (United States) 2015 U.S. Championships | 6 | 82.25 | 6 | 167.03 | 6 | 249.28 |

Results in the 2015–16 season
| Date | Event | SP | | FS | | Total | |
| Date | Event | P | Score | P | Score | P | Score |
|---|---|---|---|---|---|---|---|
| Sep 16–20, 2015 | (United States) 2015 CS U.S. International Classic | 1 | 74.66 | 5 | 135.37 | 3 | 209.93 |
| Oct 23–25, 2015 | (United States) 2015 Skate America | 2 | 78.96 | 8 | 136.15 | 7 | 215.11 |
| Nov 20–22, 2015 | (Russia) 2015 Rostelecom Cup | 3 | 85.36 | 4 | 163.56 | 3 | 248.92 |
| Jan 16–24, 2016 | (United States) 2016 U.S. Championships | 2 | 90.90 | 6 | 157.11 | 5 | 248.01 |
| Feb 16–21, 2016 | (Taiwan) 2016 Four Continents Championships | 17 | 58.17 | 12 | 132.85 | 14 | 191.12 |

Results in the 2016–17 season
| Date | Event | SP | | FS | | Total | |
| Date | Event | P | Score | P | Score | P | Score |
|---|---|---|---|---|---|---|---|
| Sep 14–18, 2016 | (United States) 2016 CS U.S. International Classic | 8 | 71.37 | 6 | 143.11 | 6 | 214.48 |
| Oct 28–30, 2016 | 2016 Skate Canada International | 11 | 63.92 | 12 | 132.61 | 12 | 196.53 |
| Nov 18–20, 2016 | 2016 Cup of China | 6 | 76.73 | 8 | 136.61 | 9 | 213.34 |
| Jan 14–22, 2017 | (United States) 2017 U.S. Championships | 2 | 88.67 | 8 | 151.67 | 5 | 240.35 |

Results in the 2017–18 season
| Date | Event | SP | | FS | | Total | |
| Date | Event | P | Score | P | Score | P | Score |
|---|---|---|---|---|---|---|---|
| Sep 20–23,2017 | (Canada) 2017 CS Autumn Classic International | 8 | 69.84 | 6 | 150.12 | 6 | 219.96 |
| Oct 6–8, 2017 | (Finland) 2017 CS Finlandia Trophy | 7 | 71.64 | 4 | 162.08 | 5 | 233.72 |
| Nov 24–26, 2017 | (United States) 2017 Skate America | 8 | 71.59 | 5 | 148.03 | 6 | 219.62 |
| Dec 29, 2017 – Jan 8, 2018 | (United States) 2018 U.S. Championships | 6 | 88.91 | 2 | 185.60 | 2 | 274.51 |

=== Junior level ===
Results in the 2007–08 season
| Date | Event | SP | | FS | | Total | |
| Date | Event | P | Score | P | Score | P | Score |
|---|---|---|---|---|---|---|---|
| Mar 29–30, 2008 | (Italy) 2008 Gardena Spring Trophy | 2 | 50.60 | 3 | 92.57 | 2 | 143.17 |

Results in the 2008–09 season
| Date | Event | SP | | FS | | Total | |
| Date | Event | P | Score | P | Score | P | Score |
|---|---|---|---|---|---|---|---|
| Jan 18–25, 2009 | (United States) 2009 U.S. Championships (Junior) | 1 | 66.62 | 2 | 117.18 | 1 | 183.80 |
| Feb 23 – Mar 1, 2009 | (Bulgaria) 2009 World Junior Championships | 9 | 59.15 | 9 | 105.65 | 10 | 164.80 |

Results in the 2009–10 season
| Date | Event | SP | | FS | | Total | |
| Date | Event | P | Score | P | Score | P | Score |
|---|---|---|---|---|---|---|---|
| Sep 3–4, 2009 | 2009 JGP United States | 1 | 63.82 | 1 | 116.13 | 1 | 179.95 |
| Oct 7–11, 2009 | 2009 JGP Croatia | 2 | 66.86 | 2 | 129.22 | 2 | 196.08 |
| Dec 3–6, 2009 | (Japan) 2009–10 JGP Final | 2 | 70.85 | 4 | 125.24 | 3 | 196.09 |
