= Mark Ladwig =

American pair skater

Mark Ladwig OLY
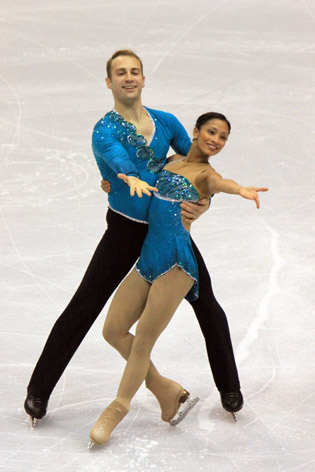
- Evora and Ladwig in 2009.

Personal information
- Born: May 6, 1980 (age 46) Fargo, North Dakota, U.S.
- Height: 5 ft 10 in (1.78 m)

Figure skating career
- Country: United States
- Skating club: Red River Valley FSC
- Began skating: 1985

Mark Ladwig (born May 6, 1980) is an American former competitive pair skater. He is best known for his partnership with Amanda Evora, with whom he competed at the 2010 Winter Olympics, placing tenth. They won bronze at an ISU Grand Prix event, the 2010 Cup of Russia, and two U.S. national silver medals. He later skated with Lindsay Davis for one season.

== Personal life ==
Mark Ladwig was born in Fargo, North Dakota to Carol and John, a medical technician and a doctor respectively, and grew up in Moorhead, Minnesota with two siblings, Todd and Erin. He married his wife, Janet, in August 2006. A boy named Holden Everett was born September 13, 2009. A second son, Felix Rye Ladwig, was born July 1, 2014.

== Career ==
Ladwig skated with Kelsey Sollom until 1999 in Moorhead, Minnesota and then with Keri Blakinger while at the University of Delaware Figure Skating Club in Newark, Delaware. He volunteered at the 2002 Winter Olympics and worked in Salt Lake Olympic Square.

In June 2002, Ladwig began skating with Amanda Evora. They finished 12th in their debut at the U.S. Championships and fifth at their first ISU Championship, the 2005 Four Continents. In 2007, Ladwig began serving on the U.S. Figure Skating Athletes Advisory Committee. He was the pairs vice-chair of the 2008–09 Athletes Advisory Committee.

2009–10 was a breakthrough season for Evora/Ladwig. They took second at the U.S Championships, their best finish at the event, which led to their selection for the US Olympic team. At the 2010 Vancouver Olympics, they beat their previous personal best by a sizable margin, and finished tenth, making them the top US pair at the Olympics. They later competed at Worlds for the first time in their career, and finished in ninth place.

During 2010–2011 season, Evora/Ladwig were assigned to compete at Cup of China where they finished fifth (151.66 pts) and later earned their first Grand Prix medal, a bronze, at Rostelecom Cup, with a season's best of 110.27 and total score of 162.85. Evora/Ladwig repeated at US Nationals earning their second silver medal, and were selected to compete at Four Continents and Worlds. At Four Continents, Ladwig's left skate heel broke during the short program, but he and Evora were able to resume the program within the allowed three minutes after Canadian Rudi Swiegers lent his own boot to Ladwig. Ladwig was able to repair his skate prior to the free skate, and the pair went on to finish sixth overall. Evora/Ladwig were noted for their longevity as a pair, which is rare in U.S. pair skating. Their partnership ended when Evora retired from competitive skating on April 10, 2012.

Ladwig was elected to the USOC AAC in 2012. In May, he announced that he had teamed up with Lindsay Davis. Davis/Ladwig competed at two Grand Prix events and won the pewter medal at the 2013 U.S. Championships. They confirmed the end of their partnership in February 2013.

== Programs ==
=== With Davis ===
Season	Short program	Free skating	Exhibition
2012–2013	Beethoven's 5 Secrets by The Piano Guys	Angels & Demons by Hans Zimmer	Too Close by Alex Clare

=== With Evora ===
Season	Short program	Free skating	Exhibition
2011–2012	The Man I Love by George Gershwin	Daphnis et Chloé by Maurice Ravel; Reverie by Claude Debussy	
2010–2011	The Mask of Zorro by James Horner	Nessun Dorma by Giacomo Puccini	
2009–2010	Portuguese Love Theme (from Love Actually) by Craig Armstrong	Piano Concerto No. 2 in C Minor by Sergei Rachmaninoff	
2008–2009	Santorini by Yanni	Pas De Deux (from The Nutcracker) by Pyotr Ilyich Tchaikovsky	Your Song (from Moulin Rouge!) performed by Ewan McGregor
2007–2008	Stray Cat Strut by the Stray Cats and Brian Setzer	Daphnis et Chloé by Maurice Ravel; Reverie by Claude Debussy	
2006–2007	Black Magic Woman by Santana	West Side Story	
2005–2006	Hotel California by the Eagles	Romeo and Juliet by Sergei Prokofiev	
2004–2005	Theme for the Common Man by Aaron Copland	Butterfly Suite by Vanessa-Mae	
2003–2004	Smokie Joe's Cafe	Scheherazade by Nikolai Rimsky-Korsakov	

== Competitive highlights ==
=== With Davis ===
International
Event	2012–13
GP NHK Trophy	6th
GP Skate Canada	7th
U.S. Classic	5th
National
U.S. Championships	4th

=== With Evora ===
International
Event	2002–03	2003–04	2004–05	2005–06	2006–07	2007–08	2008–09	2009–10	2010–11	2011–12
Olympics								10th		
Worlds								9th	11th	
Four Continents			5th						6th	6th
GP Bompard										4th
GP Cup of China							4th	7th	5th	4th
GP Cup of Russia									3rd	
GP Skate America				9th		4th		5th		
GP Skate Canada				8th			7th			
Nebelhorn			5th			3rd				
Golden Spin		1st								
National
U.S. Champ.	12th	10th	5th	7th	4th	5th	4th	2nd	2nd	3rd
