= John Kerr (figure skater) =

Scottish ice dancer

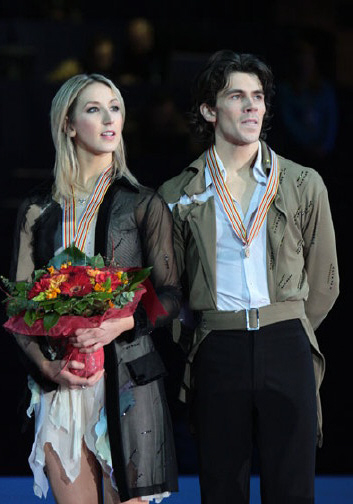
- The Kerrs in 2009.

Personal information
- Full name: John Kerr
- Born: 2 June 1980 (age 46) Broxburn, Scotland
- Home town: Edinburgh, Scotland
- Height: 1.74 m (5 ft 8 1/2 in)

Figure skating career
- Country: Great Britain
- Partner: Sinead Kerr
- Began skating: 1989
- Retired: 6 April 2011
Medal record
Figure skating
Ice dancing
Representing Great Britain
European Championships
| Bronze medal – third place | 2011 Bern | Ice dancing |
| Bronze medal – third place | 2009 Helsinki | Ice dancing |

John Alastair Kerr (born 2 June 1980 in Broxburn, Scotland) is a Scottish former competitive ice dancer who represented Great Britain with his sister Sinead Kerr. Together, they are two-time (2009, 2011) European bronze medalists and the 2004–2010 British national champions.

The Kerrs retired from competitive skating in April 2011.

== Career ==
=== Early career ===
John Kerr started skating at the age of nine after watching his sister. He competed in singles skating until he was 17, landing jumps up to the triple Lutz. After his partnership with Anna Syrett ended, he teamed up with older sister Sinead. They skated as juniors for one season, then moved up to the senior level. The Kerrs finished 2nd at the British Nationals in 2000 and were on the podium every year afterward. Despite this, in 2003, they lost their funding from Sportscotland.

=== 2004–2006 ===
During the 2003–4 season, the Kerrs won their first British title and went on to a top ten finish at their first Europeans and 14th at the 2004 Worlds. They were the first British ice dancers to make the top ten at the European Championships since Jayne Torvill and Christopher Dean. They improved to 8th and 12th, respectively, in 2005.

In 2006, the Kerrs were chosen to represent Great Britain at the 2006 Winter Olympics, where they finished 10th. Suffering again from a lack of funding, they were forced to find creative training options: "when we trained for the 2006 Olympics, we'd often have to do it during a public session. Our coach would go around saying 'Move to the sides please. They're going to the Olympics.' The best way to avoid paying for ice time, and we couldn't afford to pay, was to ask politely if people would let us past." Following the 2005–06 season, they began to receive funding from both Sportscotland and UK Sport which allowed them to make a coaching change. They moved to New Jersey, in the United States, to train with two-time Olympic champion Evgeni Platov.

=== 2006–2009 ===
The Kerrs continued to move up the ranks, and established a reputation for performing innovative and unique programs. They worked with Christopher Dean in 2007–08 and Maya Usova and Evgeni Platov in 2008–09. They had their best season yet in 2008–09, winning bronze medals at both their Grand Prix events for the first time in their career and finishing third at the European Championships. They were the first British dance team to medal at the event since Jayne Torvill and Christopher Dean won the title 15 years earlier.

=== 2009–2010 season ===
The Kerrs had a mostly successful campaign in 2009–10, winning medals at both Grand Prix events and qualifying for their first Grand Prix Final, where they finished 4th. They were fifth at the European Championships, 8th at the 2010 Winter Olympics and a career-best 5th at Worlds.

=== 2010–2011 season ===
Although they had originally planned to retire following the 2010 season, the Kerrs eventually announced that they would continue to skate competitively. Liking their exhibition music so much, they decided to rework it into a free dance with choreographer Peter Tchernyshev. Their assigned events for the 2010–11 Grand Prix series were Skate Canada and the Rostelecom Cup. They had also planned to compete once again at the Finlandia Trophy; however, Sinead Kerr suffered a shoulder injury which forced them to miss the event. They finished second at Skate Canada and withdrew from the Rostelecom Cup due to Sinead's shoulder injury. They returned to competition at the 2011 European Championships where they won the bronze medal.

On 29 March 2011, the Kerrs announced on their website that they would be unable to compete at the 2011 Worlds because of Sinead's recurring shoulder injury. They officially announced their retirement from competitive skating on 6 April 2011.

=== Post-competitive career ===
The Kerrs have taken part in many shows around the world and are considered among the more popular ice dance teams currently performing. In December 2011, the Kerrs began performing with Stars on Ice. In late January 2012, they served as ambassadors for the 2012 European Championships in Sheffield, England. The Kerrs also skate as part of the Ice Theatre of New York and, in November 2012, they taped an appearance in an episode of Glee.

In addition to show skating, Kerr works with Galit Chait's coaching team in Hackensack, New Jersey. He was co-coach of Israel's Allison Reed / Vasili Rogov. Kerr has also done choreography, including a program for Kyoko Ina / John Zimmerman.

=== Coaches and influences ===
The Kerrs' favourite skaters are Isabelle Duchesnay and Paul Duchesnay. They sometimes chose music unusual for a competition, e.g. Muse or Linkin Park, explaining, "We always like to look outside the boundaries of what people think they're going to get in an ice dance competition." They began working with Platov in June 2006 and trained in New Jersey, initially at Floyd Hall and then moved to the Princeton Sports Center in Monmouth Junction. Their choreographers included Platov, Tatiana Druchinina (2007–08 free dance), Peter Tchernyshev (2010–11 free dance), and Robert Royston (2008–09, 2009–10 original dances), and their costume designers included Natella Abdulaeva.

== Personal life ==
Kerr's mother, Maeve, is a retired nurse; father Alastair is a general practitioner. Besides his sister Sinead, he also has a brother named David. John Kerr has worked as an actor, appearing in various television shows. In April 2013, he became engaged to former ice dancer Nadine Ahmed, born in Miami, Florida. They married on 21 June 2014. Their son, Zayn Alastair Kerr, was born in Florida on 9 January 2017.

== Programs ==
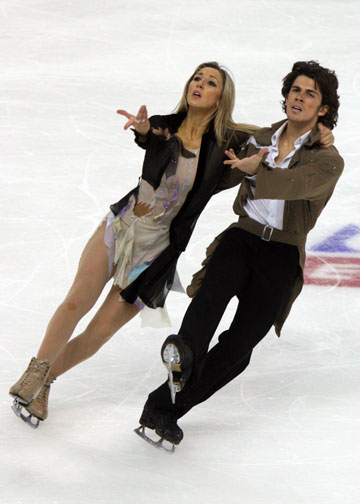
The Kerrs at the 2008 Skate America.

| Season | Short dance | Free dance | Exhibition |
|---|---|---|---|
| 2010–2011 | At Last by Etta James; Shut Up and Let Me Go by The Ting Tings | Exogenesis: Symphony Part 3 by Muse | A Beautiful Mine (from Mad Men) by RJD2; Rolling in the Deep by Adele |
| | Original dance | | |
| 2009–2010 | I've Been Everywhere performed by Johnny Cash | Krwlng by Linkin Park | Exogenesis: Symphony: Part 3 (Redemption) by Muse |
| 2008–2009 | Lindy Hop (40s): The Boogie Bumper by Big Bad Voodoo Daddy; West Coast Swing (40s): Minnie The Moocher by Cab Calloway, Irving Mills; Lindy Hop (40s): The Boogie Bumper by Big Bad Voodoo Daddy | Ruled by Secrecy by Muse | Auld Lang Syne and other Scottish folk music |
| 2007–2008 | Scottish dance: Erin Shore; Auld Lang Syne by Robbie Burns | Enigma: The Landing; Turn Around; Gravity of Love | With or Without You by U2 |
| 2006–2007 | Tango Verano Porteno by Raul Garello; Libertango by Astor Piazzolla | The Last of the Mohicans by Trevor Jones | |
| 2005–2006 | Cha Cha: Speak Up Mambo by A. Castellanos and I. Marin; Rhumba: El Raton by Romero; Samba: Batacuda by Carlinhos Brown | The Porridge Men: Coronach; Gulravage; Planet Porridge; Coronach | |
| 2004–2005 | Foxtrot: Baby it's Cold Outside by Frank Loesser; Quickstep: Mr. Pinstripe Suit by Scotty Morris | Like I Love You; Cry Me a River by Justin Timberlake; Pop by Justin Timberlake, Wade Robson | |
| 2003–2004 | Man with the Hex; Lover Lies by Jay Thomson, The Atomic Fireballs | The Matrix by Rob Dougan | |
| 2002–2003 | | Backstreet Boys | |
| 2001–2002 | | The Last of the Mohicans | |

== Competitive highlights ==
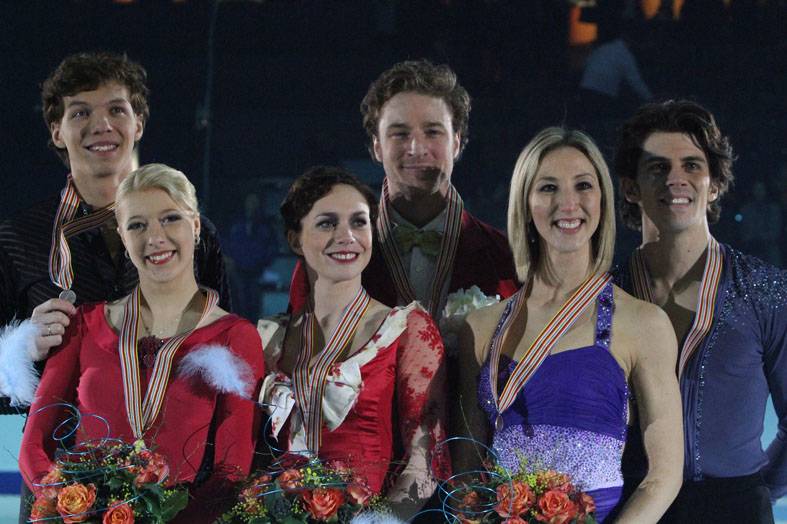
The Kerrs with the other medalists at the 2011 Europeans.

(with Sinead Kerr)

Results
International
| Event | 2000–01 | 2001–02 | 2002–03 | 2003–04 | 2004–05 | 2005–06 | 2006–07 | 2007–08 | 2008–09 | 2009–10 | 2010–11 |
|---|---|---|---|---|---|---|---|---|---|---|---|
| Olympics | | | | | | 10th | | | | 8th | |
| Worlds | | | | 14th | 12th | 11th | 11th | 8th | 7th | 5th | |
| Europeans | | | | 10th | 8th | 8th | 5th | 6th | 3rd | 5th | 3rd |
| Grand Prix Final | | | | | | | | | | 4th | |
| GP Bompard | | | | | | | | | 3rd | 3rd | |
| GP Cup of China | | | | | | | | 5th | | | |
| GP Cup of Russia | | | | 9th | 5th | | 4th | | | | WD |
| GP NHK Trophy | | | | | | | | 4th | | 2nd | |
| GP Skate America | | | | | 5th | | 5th | | 3rd | | |
| GP Skate Canada | | | | | | 7th | | | | | 2nd |
| Finlandia | | | | | | | | | 1st | 1st | |
| Nebelhorn | | | 7th | 4th | | | 1st | | | | |
| Golden Spin | | | 6th | | | | | | | | |
| Karl Schäfer | | | | 2nd | | | | | | | |
| Ondrej Nepela | | | 4th | | | | | | | | |
National
| British | 2nd | 3rd | 2nd | 1st | 1st | 1st | 1st | 1st | 1st | 1st | |
| Scottish | | 1st | 1st | | | | | | | | |
GP = Grand Prix; WD = Withdrew
