= Sinead Kerr =

Scottish-British ice dancer

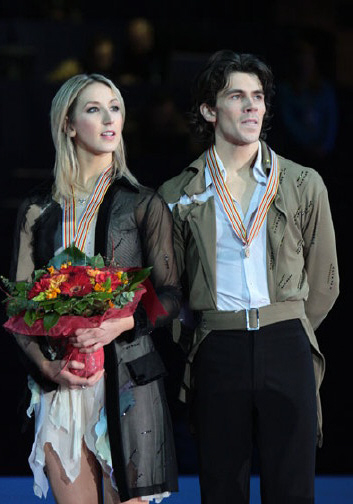
- The Kerrs in 2009.

Personal information
- Full name: Sinead Kerr
- Born: 30 August 1978 (age 48) Dundee, Scotland
- Home town: Edinburgh, Scotland
- Height: 1.68 m (5 ft 6 in)

Figure skating career
- Country: Great Britain
- Partner: John Kerr
- Began skating: 1986
- Retired: 6 April 2011
Medal record
Figure skating
Ice dancing
Representing Great Britain
European Championships
| Bronze medal – third place | 2011 Bern | Ice dancing |
| Bronze medal – third place | 2009 Helsinki | Ice dancing |

Sinead Houston Kerr (born 30 August 1978) is a Scottish former competitive ice dancer who represented Great Britain. She teamed up with her brother John Kerr in 2000. They are two-time (2009, 2011) European bronze medalists and the 2004–2010 British national champions. They placed 10th at the 2006 Winter Olympics in Turin, Italy, and 8th at the 2010 Winter Olympics in Vancouver, British Columbia, Canada.

The Kerrs retired from competitive skating in April 2011.

== Personal life ==
Sinead Kerr was born on 30 August 1978 in Dundee, Scotland. She is the daughter of Maeve, a retired nurse, and Alastair, a general practitioner, and has two brothers, John and David. She has worked as a model for Alexander McQueen and as an actress. She married Canadian ice hockey player Grant Marshall in July 2016.

== Early career ==
Sinead Kerr started roller skating at age 8 and began figure skating about a year later, eventually choosing the latter. She trained as a singles skater before taking up ice dance at age 15.

Kerr's first ice dancing partner was Jamie Ferguson. Making their first international appearance, they placed ninth at the European Youth Olympic Festival, held in February 1995 in Andorra. In November–December 1995, they competed at the 1996 World Junior Championships in Brisbane, Australia, and finished 19th.

Making their senior debut, Kerr/Ferguson placed ninth at the Karl Schäfer Memorial in October 1996. They won three senior medals, two bronze and one silver, at the British Championships. Joan Slater coached them in Edinburgh. Kerr/Ferguson parted ways after the 1999–2000 season.

== Partnership with John Kerr ==
In 2000, Sinead Kerr teamed up with younger brother John, whose experience at the time was mainly in men's singles. The Kerrs took the silver medal at their first British Nationals, in 2000, and finished fourth in their international debut, at the 2001 Ondrej Nepela Memorial.

In 2003, the Kerrs lost their funding from Sportscotland. Shortly afterward, they won their first British title and went on to a top ten finish at their first Europeans and 14th at the 2004 Worlds. They improved to 8th and 12th, respectively, in 2005. They were the first British ice dancers to make the top ten at the European Championships since Jayne Torvill and Christopher Dean.

In 2006 they were chosen to represent Great Britain at the 2006 Winter Olympics, where they finished 10th. Initially, they received no funding, "When we trained for the 2006 Olympics, we'd often have to do it during a public session. Our coach would go around saying 'Move to the sides please. They're going to the Olympics.' The best way to avoid paying for ice time, and we couldn't afford to pay, was to ask politely if people would let us past." Following the 2005–06 season, they began to receive funding from both Sportscotland and UK Sport which allowed them to make a coaching change. They moved to New Jersey, in the United States, to train with two-time Olympic champion Evgeni Platov. The Kerrs continued to move up the ranks over the next three seasons, and established a reputation for performing innovative and unique programs. They worked with Christopher Dean in 2007–08 and Maya Usova and Evgeni Platov in 2008–09. They had their best season yet in 2008–9, winning bronze medals at both their Grand Prix events for the first time in their career and finishing third at the European Championships. They were the first British dance team to medal at the event since Jayne Torvill and Christopher Dean did so 15 years earlier.

The Kerrs had a mostly successful campaign in 2009–10, qualifying for their first Grand Prix Final, where they finished 4th. They were fifth at the European Championships, 8th at the 2010 Winter Olympics and a career-best 5th at Worlds.

Although they had originally planned to retire following the 2009–10 season, the Kerrs decided to continue for another season. Having enjoyed their exhibition music, they decided to rework it into a free dance with choreographer Peter Tchernyshev. Their assigned events for the 2010–11 Grand Prix series were Skate Canada and the Rostelecom Cup. A month prior to Skate Canada, Sinead Kerr suffered a shoulder injury. They finished second at Skate Canada and withdrew from the Rostelecom Cup due to Sinead's shoulder injury. They returned to competition at the 2011 European Championships where they won the bronze medal.

On 29 March 2011, the Kerrs announced on their website that they would be unable to compete at the 2011 Worlds because of Sinead's recurring shoulder injury. They officially announced their retirement from competitive skating on 6 April 2011.

The Kerrs have taken part in many shows around the world and are considered among the more popular ice dance teams currently performing. Their favourite skaters are Isabelle Duchesnay / Paul Duchesnay. They sometimes chose music unusual for a competition, e.g. Muse or Linkin Park, explaining, "We always like to look outside the boundaries of what people think they're going to get in an ice dance competition." They began working with Platov in June 2006 and trained in New Jersey, initially at Floyd Hall and then moved to the Princeton Sports Center in Monmouth Junction. Their choreographers included Platov, Tatiana Druchinina (2007–08 free dance), Peter Tchernyshev (2010–11 free dance), and Robert Royston (2008–09, 2009–10 original dances), and their costume designers included Natella Abdulaeva.

In December 2011, the Kerrs began performing with Stars on Ice. In late January 2012, they served as ambassadors for the 2012 European Championships in Sheffield, England. The Kerrs also skate as part of the Ice Theatre of New York and, in November 2012, they taped an appearance in an episode of Glee.

== Programs ==
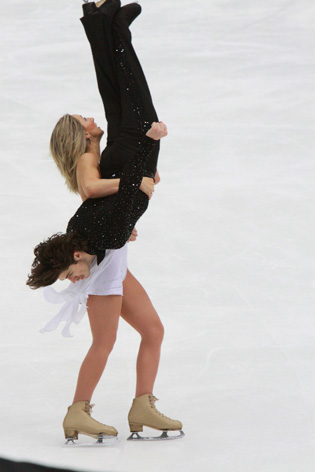
The Kerrs perform a reverse lift in 2009.

| Season | Short dance | Free dance | Exhibition |
|---|---|---|---|
| 2010–2011 | At Last by Etta James; Shut Up and Let Me Go by The Ting Tings | Exogenesis: Symphony Part 3 by Muse | A Beautiful Mine (from Mad Men) by RJD2; Rolling in the Deep by Adele |
| | Original dance | | |
| 2009–2010 | I've Been Everywhere performed by Johnny Cash | Krwlng by Linkin Park | Exogenesis: Symphony: Part 3 (Redemption) by Muse |
| 2008–2009 | Lindy Hop (40s): The Boogie Bumper by Big Bad Voodoo Daddy; West Coast Swing (40s): Minnie The Moocher by Cab Calloway, Irving Mills; Lindy Hop (40s): The Boogie Bumper by Big Bad Voodoo Daddy | Ruled by Secrecy by Muse | Auld Lang Syne and other Scottish folk music |
| 2007–2008 | Scottish dance: Erin Shore; Auld Lang Syne by Robbie Burns | Enigma: The Landing; Turn Around; Gravity of Love | With or Without You by U2 |
| 2006–2007 | Tango Verano Porteno by Raul Garello; Libertango by Astor Piazzolla | The Last of the Mohicans by Trevor Jones | |
| 2005–2006 | Cha Cha: Speak Up Mambo by A. Castellanos and I. Marin; Rhumba: El Raton by Romero; Samba: Batacuda by Carlinhos Brown | The Porridge Men: Coronach; Gulravage; Planet Porridge; Coronach | |
| 2004–2005 | Foxtrot: Baby it's Cold Outside by Frank Loesser; Quickstep: Mr. Pinstripe Suit by Scotty Morris | Like I Love You; Cry Me a River by Justin Timberlake; Pop by Justin Timberlake, Wade Robson | |
| 2003–2004 | Man with the Hex; Lover Lies by Jay Thomson, The Atomic Fireballs | The Matrix by Rob Dougan | |
| 2002–2003 | | Backstreet Boys | |
| 2001–2002 | | The Last of the Mohicans | |

|}

== Competitive highlights ==
GP: Grand Prix

=== With Kerr ===
International
| Event | 00–01 | 01–02 | 02–03 | 03–04 | 04–05 | 05–06 | 06–07 | 07–08 | 08–09 | 09–10 | 10–11 |
|---|---|---|---|---|---|---|---|---|---|---|---|
| Olympics | | | | | | 10th | | | | 8th | |
| Worlds | | | | 14th | 12th | 11th | 11th | 8th | 7th | 5th | |
| Europeans | | | | 10th | 8th | 8th | 5th | 6th | 3rd | 5th | 3rd |
| GP Final | | | | | | | | | | 4th | |
| GP Bompard | | | | | | | | | 3rd | 3rd | |
| GP Cup of China | | | | | | | | 5th | | | |
| GP Cup of Russia | | | | 9th | 5th | | 4th | | | | WD |
| GP NHK Trophy | | | | | | | | 4th | | 2nd | |
| GP Skate America | | | | | 5th | | 5th | | 3rd | | |
| GP Skate Canada | | | | | | 7th | | | | | 2nd |
| Finlandia Trophy | | | | | | | | | 1st | 1st | |
| Nebelhorn Trophy | | | 7th | 4th | | | 1st | | | | |
| Golden Spin | | | 6th | | | | | | | | |
| Schäfer Memorial | | | | 2nd | | | | | | | |
| Nepela Memorial | | | 4th | | | | | | | | |
National
| British Champ. | 2nd | 3rd | 2nd | 1st | 1st | 1st | 1st | 1st | 1st | 1st | |
| Scottish Champ. | | 1st | 1st | | | | | | | | |
WD: Withdrew

=== With Ferguson ===
International
| Event | 94–95 | 95–96 | 96–97 | 97–98 | 98–99 | 99–00 |
|---|---|---|---|---|---|---|
| Basler Cup | | | 5th | | | |
| Finlandia Trophy | | | | | 6th | |
| Lysiane Lauret | | | 15th | | | |
| Nebelhorn Trophy | | | | | 5th | |
| Schäfer Memorial | | | 9th | | | |
International: Junior
| Junior Worlds | | 19th | | | | |
| EYOF | 9th | | | | | |
National
| British Champ. | | | 5th | 3rd | 2nd | 3rd |
