= Chen Peitong =

Chinese figure skater

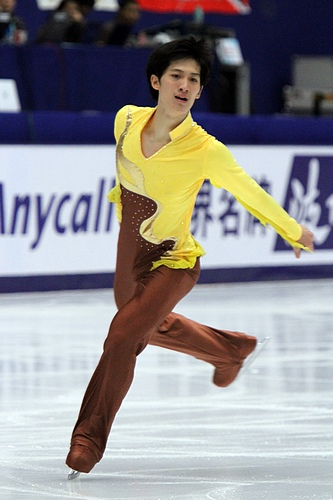

Personal information
- Full name: Chen Peitong
- Born: July 20, 1989 (age 36) Changchun
- Home town: Changchun
- Height: 1.77 m (5 ft 9 1/2 in)

Figure skating career
- Country: China
- Coach: Gao Haijun
- Skating club: Beijing Century Star SC

Chen Peitong (simplified Chinese: 陈沛佟; traditional Chinese: 陳沛佟; pinyin: Chén Pèitóng; July 20, 1989) is a Chinese figure skater.

== Programs ==
Season	Short program	Free skating
2010–2011	Yellow River Piano Concerto by Xian Xinghai	Don Quixote

== Competitive highlights ==
Event	2009-10	2010–11	2011–12	2012–13
Chinese Championships	8th		8th	6th
Cup of China		11th		
Chinese National Games			6th	
