= Dong Huibo =

Chinese pair skater

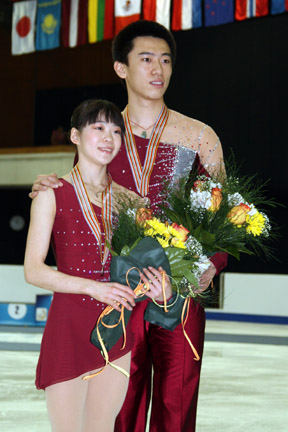
- Dong Huibo and Wu Yiming in 2008

Personal information
- Full name: Dong Huibo
- Born: February 15, 1989 (age 37) Changchun
- Height: 1.53 m (5 ft 0 in)

Figure skating career
- Country: China
- Partner: Wu Yiming
- Coach: Yao Bin; Sun Yu; Ding Yang
- Skating club: Jilin Winter Sport Centre

Dong Huibo (Chinese: 董慧博; pinyin: Dǒng Huìbó; born February 15, 1989, in Changchun, Jilin) is a Chinese former competitive pair skater. With partner Wu Yiming, she is the 2008 World Junior bronze medalist. She previously competed as a single skater on the national level.

== Results ==
Event	2007–08	2008–09	2009–10	2010–11	2011–12
World Championships	12th		17th	14th	
Four Continents Championships		9th	8th	10th	10th
World Junior Championships	3rd				
Chinese Championships		1st	2nd	4th	5th
Skate Canada International		8th		7th	
Cup of China			6th	7th	
Trophée Eric Bompard		4th	6th		
Winter Universiade		2nd		3rd	
ISU Junior Grand Prix, Great Britain	11th				
ISU Junior Grand Prix, Estonia	7th				
