= 2011 European Figure Skating Championships =

Figure skating competition

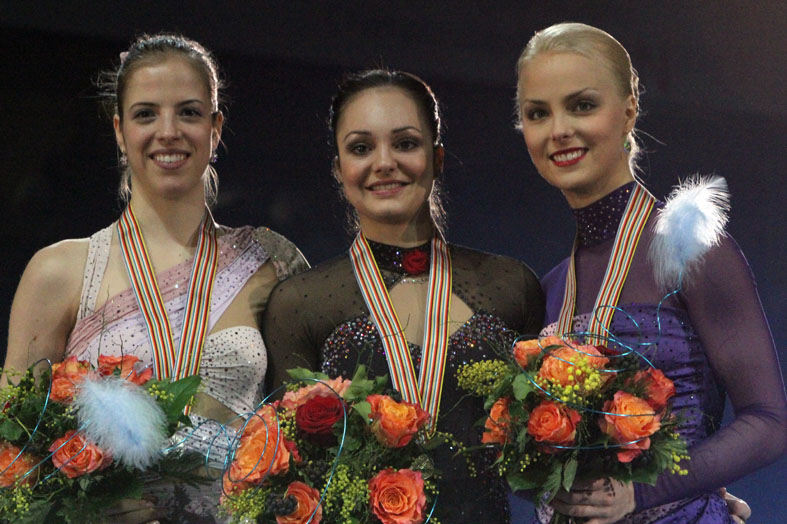
- The medalists in the ladies' event
- Type: ISU Championship
- Date: 24 January – 30
- Season: 2010–11
- Location: Bern, Switzerland
- Venue: PostFinance Arena

Champions
- Men's singles: (France) Florent Amodio
- Ladies' singles: (Switzerland) Sarah Meier
- Pairs: (Germany) Aliona Savchenko / Robin Szolkowy
- Ice dance: (France) Nathalie Péchalat / Fabian Bourzat
- Previous: 2010 European Championships
- Next: 2012 European Championships

The 2011 European Figure Skating Championships was an international figure skating competition in the 2010–11 season. Skaters competed in the categories of men's singles, ladies' singles, pair skating, and ice dancing.

The 2011 competition was held from 24 to 30 January 2011 at the PostFinance Arena in Bern, Switzerland.

== Qualification ==
The competition was open to skaters from a European member nations of the International Skating Union who had reached the age of 15 before 1 July 2010. The corresponding competition for non-European skaters was the 2011 Four Continents Championships. Based on the results of the 2010 European Championships, each country was allowed between one and three entries per discipline. National associations selected their entries based on their own criteria but those skaters had to achieve a minimum technical elements score (TES) at an international event prior to the European Championships. The minimum TES for each discipline and segment were:

Discipline	Short program/dance	Free skating/dance
Men	20	35
Ladies	15	25
Pairs	17	30
Ice dance	17	28

With the exception of pairs, skaters who were ranked lower in the World Standings list also had to skate in a preliminary round before the main event. For advancement, the men's event required a top-11 finish; the ladies', a top-10 finish; and the ice dance, a top-8 finish.

The following countries earned more than one entry to the 2011 European Championships based on performance at the 2010 event.

Spots	Men	Ladies	Pairs	Dance
3	France; Switzerland	Finland	Germany; Russia	Italy; Russia
2	Belgium; Czech Republic; Germany; Italy; Russia; Spain; Sweden	Estonia; Georgia; Hungary; Russia; Switzerland	France; Italy; Switzerland; Ukraine (United Kingdom) Great Britain	France; Hungary; Israel; Ukraine (United Kingdom) Great Britain

== Entries ==
Country	Men	Ladies	Pairs	Ice dancing
Austria	Viktor Pfeifer	Belinda Schönberger	Stina Martini / Severin Kiefer	Kira Geil / Tobias Eisenbauer
Belarus	Mikhail Karaliuk	Nastassia Hrybko	Lubov Bakirova / Mikalai Kamianchuk	Lesia Valadzenkava / Vitali Vakunov
Belgium	Jorik Hendrickx; Kevin van der Perren	Ira Vannut		
Bosnia and Herzegovina	Damjan Ostojič			
Bulgaria	Georgi Kenchadze	Hristina Vassileva		Kristina Tremasova / Dimitar Lichev
Croatia		Mirna Libric		
Czech Republic	Michal Březina; Tomáš Verner	Martina Boček	Klára Kadlecová / Petr Bidař	Lucie Myslivečková / Matěj Novák
Denmark	Justus Strid	Karina Johnson		
Estonia	Viktor Romanenkov	Svetlana Issakova; Gerli Liinamäe	Natalya Zabiyako / Sergei Kulbach	Irina Shtork / Taavi Rand
Finland	Valtter Virtanen	Kiira Korpi; Cecilia Törn; Juulia Turkkila		Henna Lindholm / Ossi Kanervo
France	Florent Amodio; Brian Joubert; Alban Préaubert	Maé Bérénice Méité	Adeline Canac / Yannick Bonheur	Pernelle Carron / Lloyd Jones; Nathalie Péchalat / Fabian Bourzat
Georgia		Elene Gedevanishvili		Allison Reed / Otar Japaridze
Germany	Peter Liebers; Denis Wieczorek	Sarah Hecken	Katharina Gierok / Florian Just; Maylin Hausch / Daniel Wende; Aliona Savchenko / Robin Szolkowy	Nelli Zhiganshina / Alexander Gazsi
(United Kingdom) Great Britain	David Richardson	Jenna McCorkell	Sally Hoolin / Jakub Safranek; Stacey Kemp / David King	Penny Coomes / Nicholas Buckland; Sinead Kerr / John Kerr
Greece		Georgia Glastris		
Hungary	Tigran Vardanjan	Katherine Hadford; Viktória Pavuk		Nóra Hoffmann / Maxim Zavozin; Zsuzsanna Nagy / Máté Fejes
Ireland		Clara Peters		
Israel	Maxim Shipov		Danielle Montalbano / Evgeni Krasnapolski	Brooke Elizabeth Frieling / Lionel Rumi
Italy	Paolo Bacchini; Samuel Contesti	Alice Garlisi; Carolina Kostner; Valentina Marchei	Stefania Berton / Ondřej Hotárek; Carolina Gillespie / Luca Demattè	Lorenza Alessandrini / Simone Vaturi; Federica Faiella / Massimo Scali; Federica Testa / Christopher Mior
Lithuania	Saulius Ambrulevičius			Isabella Tobias / Deividas Stagniūnas
Luxembourg		Fleur Maxwell		
Monaco	Kim Lucine			
Netherlands	Boyito Mulder	Manouk Gijsman		
Norway		Anne Line Gjersem		
Poland	Maciej Cieplucha			
Romania	Zoltán Kelemen	Sabina Măriuţă		
Russia	Artur Gachinski; Konstantin Menshov	Alena Leonova; Ksenia Makarova	Vera Bazarova / Yuri Larionov; Katarina Gerboldt / Alexander Enbert; Yuko Kavaguti / Alexander Smirnov	Ekaterina Bobrova / Dmitri Soloviev; Elena Ilinykh / Nikita Katsalapov; Ekaterina Riazanova / Ilia Tkachenko
Serbia		Marina Seeh		
Slovakia	Jakub Strobl	Alexandra Kunova		Nikola Višňová / Lukáš Csolley
Slovenia		Daša Grm		
Spain	Javier Fernández; Javier Raya	Sonia Lafuente		Sara Hurtado / Adrià Díaz
Sweden	Kristoffer Berntsson; Adrian Schultheiss	Viktoria Helgesson		
Switzerland	Laurent Alvarez; Moris Pfeifhofer; Stéphane Walker	Romy Bühler; Sarah Meier		Ramona Elsener / Florian Roost
Turkey	Ali Demirboga	Birce Atabey		
Ukraine	Anton Kovalevski	Irina Movchan		Nadezhda Frolenkova / Mikhail Kasalo; Siobhan Heekin-Canedy / Alexander Shakalov

== Schedule ==
There was no preliminary round for pairs due to the low number of entries.

Date	Time /Event
Sunday, 23 January	1st Official practice
Monday, 24 January	12:00 h Ice dance, Preliminary: Free dance 16:00 Men, Preliminary: Free skating
Tuesday, 25 January	10:00 Ladies, Preliminary: Free skating
Wednesday, 26 January	14:30 Ice dance: Short dance 18:30 Opening on ice 19:30 Pairs: Short program
Thursday, 27 January	14:00 Men: Short program 19:30 Pairs: Free skating
Friday, 28 January	14:00 Ladies: Short program 19:15 Ice dance: Free dance
Saturday, 29 January	13:00 Ladies: Free skating 18:30 Men: Free skating
Sunday, 30 January	14:30 Exhibition

== Competition notes ==
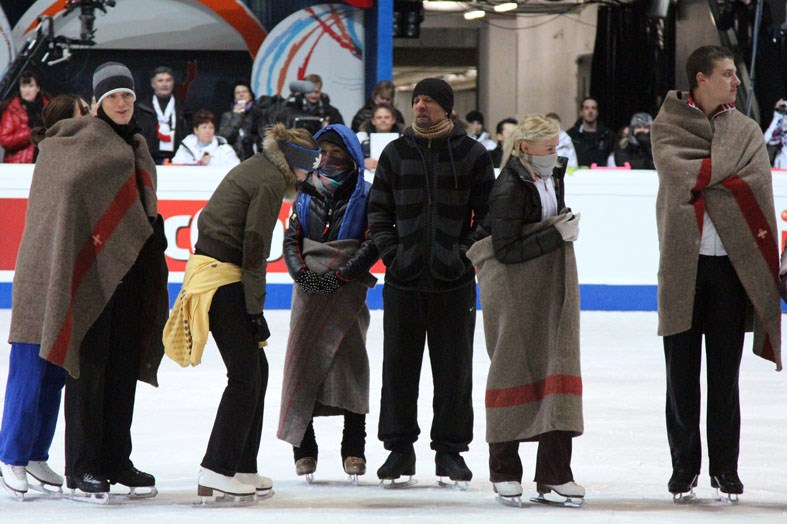
Skaters react to the rink's cold temperatures during the practice for the exhibition gala.

The temperatures at the Swiss venue were unusually cold for a skating event, reaching minus-3 Celsius. ISU President Ottavio Cinquanta conceded it was something new to have the event in such conditions and said the ISU would be more vigilant in the future. Many spectators used blankets to keep warm during the long hours of competition. Skaters also admitted they were affected by the cold, and Russian Alexander Smirnov said that he felt like the muscles weren't ready and jokingly added "If we had known about the temperature earlier, we would have prepared for it at home in St. Petersburg by skating naked," adding that "it is a little strange that a competition of this level would be held under these conditions. But the conditions are the same for everyone." German pair team Maylin Hausch and Daniel Wende aborted an Axel lasso lift on the take-off, with Wende later saying "Already after the first minute I felt like shock frozen; just before the first lift I had no feeling in my fingers and in my legs. I couldn't do anything to prevent it." The practice rink also received some criticism, with Nóra Hoffmann saying, "It was so white and everybody got lost in it. That was specially my problem there, I was so lost in the rink that I couldn't really focus, I didn't know where I was going."

In men's singles, Florent Amodio won the European title in his debut. He became the first skater to win Europeans in his first appearance at the event since Ilia Kulik did so in 1995. Brian Joubert won his tenth consecutive Europeans medal, equaling the record of most medals by a singles skater, previously set by Ulrich Salchow and matched by Karl Schäfer. In the ladies event, Sarah Meier, a previous medalist, ended her competitive career with her first European title in front of her home crowd. It was Switzerland's first gold in ladies' singles since Denise Biellmann's win at the 1981 event. In the pairs event, Aliona Savchenko / Robin Szolkowy won their fourth European title, edging out defending champions Yuko Kavaguti / Alexander Smirnov. Nathalie Pechalat / Fabian Bourzat, who had finished fourth in 2009 and 2010, reached their first ISU Championship podium and captured the gold in the ice dance event. It was France's fifth European ice dancing title after 1962, 2000, 2002, and 2007. This was the final competitive event for ice dance bronze medalists Sinead Kerr / John Kerr.

== Results ==
=== Men ===
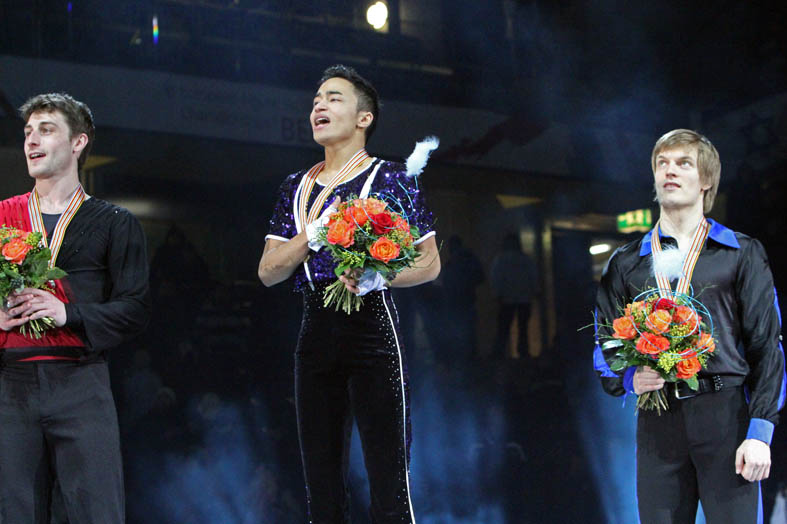
The medalists in the men's event

Rank	Name	Nation	Total points	PR		SP		FS	
1	Florent Amodio	France	226.86			1	78.11	3	148.75
2	Brian Joubert	France	223.01			7	70.44	1	152.57
3	Tomáš Verner	Czech Republic	222.60			5	72.91	2	149.69
4	Kevin van der Perren	Belgium	216.59			4	73.61	5	142.98
5	Artur Gachinski	Russia	216.07			3	73.76	6	142.31
6	Samuel Contesti	Italy	204.88			6	72.78	9	132.10
7	Konstantin Menshov	Russia	202.62			14	58.82	4	143.80
8	Michal Březina	Czech Republic	201.39			2	76.13	10	125.26
9	Javier Fernández	Spain	199.65			11	60.48	7	139.17
10	Alban Préaubert	France	196.15			10	63.77	8	132.38
11	Peter Liebers	Germany	189.00			9	64.53	11	124.47
12	Paolo Bacchini	Italy	178.34			12	59.39	13	118.95
13	Adrian Schultheiss	Sweden	178.19			15	58.36	12	119.83
14	Kristoffer Berntsson	Sweden	172.58			8	66.62	21	105.96
15	Anton Kovalevski	Ukraine	169.33			19	53.47	14	115.86
16	Jorik Hendrickx	Belgium	168.39	1	118.46	13	59.14	19	109.25
17	Kim Lucine	Monaco	167.97	2	115.12	20	52.56	15	115.41
18	Viktor Pfeifer	Austria	164.83			17	55.70	20	109.13
19	Javier Raya	Spain	164.68	5	100.82	21	51.98	17	112.70
20	Denis Wieczorek	Germany	163.60	3	111.96	22	50.62	16	112.98
21	Zoltán Kelemen	Romania	160.50	4	106.57	23	50.38	18	110.12
22	Laurent Alvarez	Switzerland	159.45			16	56.64	23	102.81
23	Maxim Shipov	Israel	158.28	8	98.84	18	53.99	22	104.29
24	Stéphane Walker	Switzerland	137.64	10	95.51	24	49.74	24	87.90
Did not advance to free skating
25	Maciej Cieplucha	Poland		9	97.14	25	49.33		
26	Moris Pfeifhofer	Switzerland		6	100.73	26	46.93		
27	Ali Demirboga	Turkey		11	92.58	27	42.09		
28	Justus Strid	Denmark		7	100.42	28	41.84		
Did not advance to short program
29	David Richardson	(United Kingdom) Great Britain		12	91.59				
30	Tigran Vardanjan	Hungary		13	89.59				
31	Damjan Ostojič	Bosnia and Herzegovina		14	85.58				
32	Jakub Strobl	Slovakia		15	83.21				
33	Valtter Virtanen	Finland		16	79.90				
34	Saulius Ambrulevičius	Lithuania		17	76.40				
35	Mikhail Karaliuk	Belarus		18	71.03				
36	Boyito Mulder	Netherlands		19	70.25				
37	Georgi Kenchadze	Bulgaria		20	68.46				
WD	Viktor Romanenkov	Estonia							

=== Ladies ===
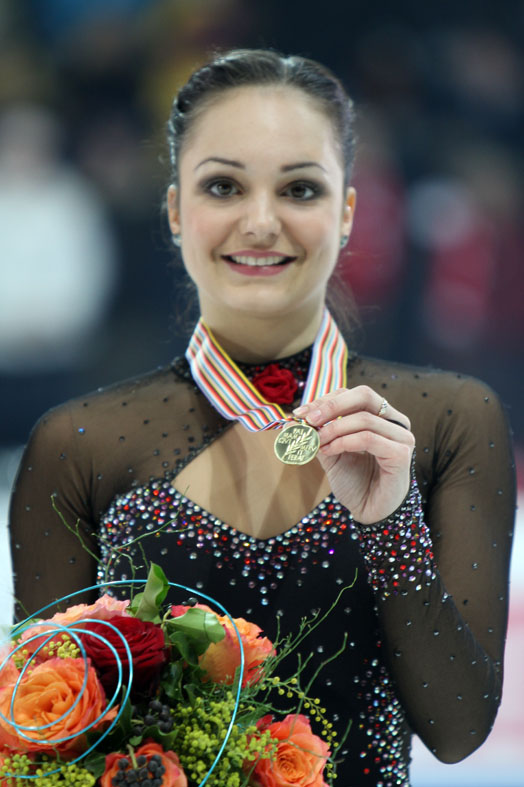
Ladies' champion Sarah Meier poses with her medal.

Rank	Name	Nation	Total points	PR		SP		FS	
1	Sarah Meier	Switzerland	170.60			3	58.56	2	112.04
2	Carolina Kostner	Italy	168.54			6	53.17	1	115.37
3	Kiira Korpi	Finland	166.40			1	63.50	4	102.90
4	Ksenia Makarova	Russia	162.04			2	60.35	5	101.69
5	Alena Leonova	Russia	154.31			13	48.40	3	105.91
6	Viktoria Helgesson	Sweden	151.66			4	54.70	7	96.96
7	Ira Vannut	Belgium	150.66	1	90.98	10	50.90	6	99.76
8	Elene Gedevanishvili	Georgia	147.96			5	53.68	8	94.28
9	Maé Bérénice Méité	France	138.74	2	87.10	7	51.61	10	87.13
10	Valentina Marchei	Italy	137.44			8	51.24	14	86.20
11	Sarah Hecken	Germany	137.43			9	51.12	12	86.31
12	Sonia Lafuente	Spain	135.82			11	49.10	11	86.72
13	Gerli Liinamäe	Estonia	133.73			16	44.07	9	89.66
14	Jenna McCorkell	(United Kingdom) Great Britain	132.15			12	48.65	15	83.50
15	Juulia Turkkila	Finland	131.38			14	45.17	13	86.21
16	Romy Bühler	Switzerland	122.33	4	74.69	15	44.42	17	77.91
17	Karina Johnson	Denmark	121.63	6	69.34	24	38.30	16	83.33
18	Svetlana Issakova	Estonia	118.44	5	73.42	18	42.30	18	76.14
19	Viktória Pavuk	Hungary	112.70			19	42.18	21	70.52
20	Daša Grm	Slovenia	112.54			21	38.97	20	73.57
21	Alice Garlisi	Italy	112.36	3	78.81	22	38.79	19	73.57
22	Fleur Maxwell	Luxembourg	110.59	9	65.29	17	43.64	24	66.95
23	Hristina Vassileva	Bulgaria	106.79	10	64.31	20	39.11	22	67.68
24	Alexandra Kunova	Slovakia	105.86			23	38.67	23	67.19
Did not advance to free skating
25	Anne Line Gjersem	Norway		7	67.38	25	34.66		
26	Irina Movchan	Ukraine				26	31.43		
27	Clara Peters	Ireland		8	65.70	27	30.91		
28	Birce Atabey	Turkey				28	30.50		
Did not advance to short program
29	Belinda Schönberger	Austria		11	63.95				
30	Nastassia Hrybko	Belarus		12	63.81				
31	Martina Boček	Czech Republic		13	61.67				
32	Cecilia Törn	Finland		14	60.54				
33	Marina Seeh	Serbia		15	58.30				
34	Katherine Hadford	Hungary		16	57.51				
35	Georgia Glastris	Greece		17	57.37				
36	Sabina Măriuţă	Romania		18	47.38				
37	Mirna Libric	Croatia		19	45.91				
WD	Manouk Gijsman	Netherlands							

=== Pairs ===
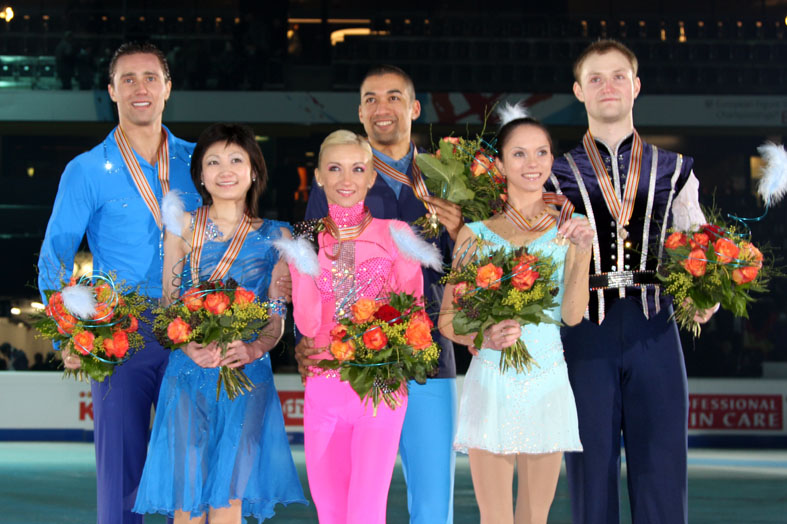
The pairs medalists

Rank	Name	Nation	Total points	SP		FS	
1	Aliona Savchenko / Robin Szolkowy	Germany	206.20	1	72.31	2	133.89
2	Yuko Kavaguti / Alexander Smirnov	Russia	203.61	2	69.49	1	134.12
3	Vera Bazarova / Yuri Larionov	Russia	188.24	3	62.89	3	125.35
4	Katarina Gerboldt / Alexander Enbert	Russia	169.95	5	57.50	4	112.45
5	Stefania Berton / Ondřej Hotárek	Italy	164.83	4	60.08	5	104.75
6	Maylin Hausch / Daniel Wende	Germany	149.97	6	53.86	6	96.11
7	Klára Kadlecová / Petr Bidař	Czech Republic	139.94	8	48.45	7	91.49
8	Stacey Kemp / David King	(United Kingdom) Great Britain	128.04	7	48.46	9	79.58
9	Adeline Canac / Yannick Bonheur	France	125.34	9	43.02	8	82.32
10	Lubov Bakirova / Mikalai Kamianchuk	Belarus	120.72	10	41.51	10	79.21
11	Katharina Gierok / Florian Just	Germany	118.06	11	40.70	11	77.36
12	Carolina Gillespie / Luca Demattè	Italy	115.53	12	40.11	12	75.42
13	Natalya Zabiyako / Sergei Kulbach	Estonia	106.47	14	35.01	13	71.46
14	Sally Hoolin / Jakub Šafránek	(United Kingdom) Great Britain	104.16	13	36.41	14	67.75
15	Stina Martini / Severin Kiefer	Austria	100.87	15	34.74	15	66.13
WD	Danielle Montalbano / Evgeni Krasnapolski	Israel					

=== Ice dancing ===
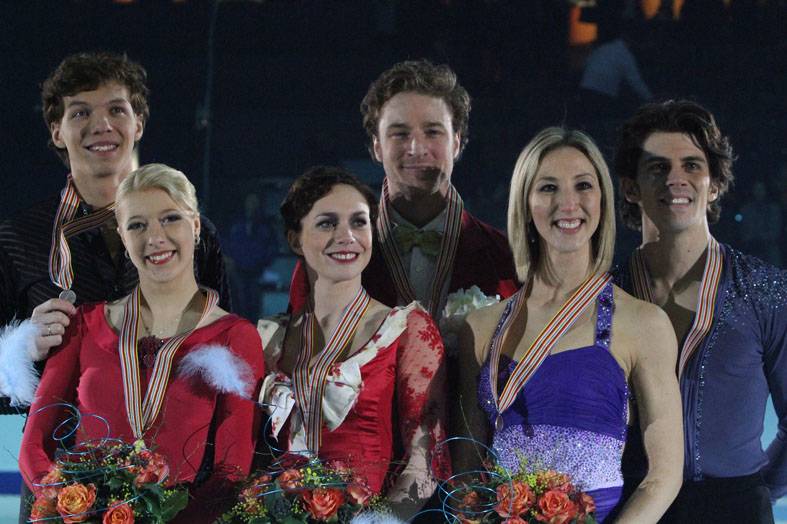
The ice dancing medalists

Rank	Name	Nation	Total points	PR		SD		FD	
1	Nathalie Péchalat / Fabian Bourzat	France	167.40			1	66.91	1	100.49
2	Ekaterina Bobrova / Dmitri Soloviev	Russia	161.14			2	65.46	2	95.68
3	Sinead Kerr / John Kerr	(United Kingdom) Great Britain	157.49			3	62.87	3	94.62
4	Elena Ilinykh / Nikita Katsalapov	Russia	153.48			4	60.93	4	92.55
5	Federica Faiella / Massimo Scali	Italy	145.92			9	57.18	5	88.74
6	Ekaterina Riazanova / Ilia Tkachenko	Russia	145.05			5	60.91	6	84.14
7	Nelli Zhiganshina / Alexander Gazsi	Germany	140.69	2	79.27	7	57.82	7	82.87
8	Nóra Hoffmann / Maxim Zavozin	Hungary	140.30			6	58.00	8	82.30
9	Pernelle Carron / Lloyd Jones	France	135.41			8	57.23	10	78.18
10	Lucie Myslivečková / Matěj Novák	Czech Republic	135.35	1	80.54	10	54.37	9	80.98
11	Siobhan Heekin-Canedy / Alexander Shakalov	Ukraine	123.27			11	49.15	11	74.12
12	Isabella Tobias / Deividas Stagniūnas	Lithuania	121.36	8	65.36	12	49.00	13	72.36
13	Nadezhda Frolenkova / Mikhail Kasalo	Ukraine	120.86			13	47.73	12	73.13
14	Penny Coomes / Nicholas Buckland	(United Kingdom) Great Britain	116.47	3	73.79	18	44.78	14	71.69
15	Sara Hurtado / Adria Diaz	Spain	115.81	5	67.20	17	44.84	15	70.97
16	Lorenza Alessandrini / Simone Vaturi	Italy	115.35			14	47.69	18	67.66
17	Allison Reed / Otar Japaridze	Georgia	114.73	7	66.24	16	46.86	17	67.87
18	Federica Testa / Christopher Mior	Italy	112.64	4	67.90	15	47.52	19	65.12
19	Ramona Elsener / Florian Roost	Switzerland	111.86	12	53.50	19	42.35	16	69.51
20	Brooke Frieling / Lionel Rumi	Israel	99.63			20	41.69	20	57.94
Did not advance to free dance
21	Irina Shtork / Taavi Rand	Estonia		6	66.38	21	38.76		
Did not advance to short dance
22	Nikola Višňová / Lukáš Csolley	Slovakia		9	63.92				
23	Kira Geil / Tobias Eisenbauer	Austria		10	63.09				
24	Zsuzsanna Nagy / Máté Fejes	Hungary		11	61.70				
25	Lesia Valadzenkava / Vitali Vakunov	Belarus		13	53.41				
26	Henna Lindholm / Ossi Kanervo	Finland		14	50.75				
27	Kristina Tremasova / Dimitar Lichev	Bulgaria		15	42.88				

== Medals summary ==
=== Medals by country ===
Table of medals for overall placement:

Rank	Nation	Gold	Silver	Bronze	Total
1	France (FRA)	2	1	0	3
2	Germany (GER)	1	0	0	1
2	Switzerland (SUI)	1	0	0	1
4	Russia (RUS)	0	2	1	3
5	Italy (ITA)	0	1	0	1
6	Czech Republic (CZE)	0	0	1	1
6	Finland (FIN)	0	0	1	1
6	Great Britain (GBR)	0	0	1	1
Totals (8 entries)		4	4	4	12

Table of small medals for placement in the short segment:

Rank	Nation	Gold	Silver	Bronze	Total
1	France (FRA)	2	0	0	2
2	Finland (FIN)	1	0	0	1
2	Germany (GER)	1	0	0	1
4	Russia (RUS)	0	3	2	5
5	Czech Republic (CZE)	0	1	0	1
6	Great Britain (GBR)	0	0	1	1
6	Switzerland (SUI)	0	0	1	1
Totals (7 entries)		4	4	4	12

Table of small medals for placement in the free segment:

Rank	Nation	Gold	Silver	Bronze	Total
1	France (FRA)	2	0	1	3
2	Russia (RUS)	1	1	2	4
3	Italy (ITA)	1	0	0	1
4	Czech Republic (CZE)	0	1	0	1
4	Germany (GER)	0	1	0	1
4	Switzerland (SUI)	0	1	0	1
7	Great Britain (GRB)	0	0	1	1
Totals (7 entries)		4	4	4	12

=== Medalists ===
Medals for overall placement:

Discipline	Gold	Silver	Bronze
Men	(France) Florent Amodio	(France) Brian Joubert	(Czech Republic) Tomáš Verner
Ladies	(Switzerland) Sarah Meier	(Italy) Carolina Kostner	(Finland) Kiira Korpi
Pair skating	(Germany) Aliona Savchenko / Robin Szolkowy	(Russia) Yuko Kavaguti / Alexander Smirnov	(Russia) Vera Bazarova / Yuri Larionov
Ice dancing	(France) Nathalie Pechalat / Fabian Bourzat	(Russia) Ekaterina Bobrova / Dmitri Soloviev	(United Kingdom) Sinead Kerr / John Kerr

Small medals for placement in the short segment:

Discipline	Gold	Silver	Bronze
Men	(France) Florent Amodio	(Czech Republic) Michal Březina	(Russia) Artur Gachinski
Ladies	(Finland) Kiira Korpi	(Russia) Ksenia Makarova	(Switzerland) Sarah Meier
Pair skating	(Germany) Aliona Savchenko / Robin Szolkowy	(Russia) Yuko Kavaguti / Alexander Smirnov	(Russia) Vera Bazarova / Yuri Larionov
Ice dancing	(France) Nathalie Pechalat / Fabian Bourzat	(Russia) Ekaterina Bobrova / Dmitri Soloviev	(United Kingdom) Sinead Kerr / John Kerr

Small medals for placement in the free segment:

Discipline	Gold	Silver	Bronze
Men	(France) Brian Joubert	(Czech Republic) Tomáš Verner	(France) Florent Amodio
Ladies	(Italy) Carolina Kostner	(Switzerland) Sarah Meier	(Russia) Alena Leonova
Pair skating	(Russia) Yuko Kavaguti / Alexander Smirnov	(Germany) Aliona Savchenko / Robin Szolkowy	(Russia) Vera Bazarova / Yuri Larionov
Ice dancing	(France) Nathalie Pechalat / Fabian Bourzat	(Russia) Ekaterina Bobrova / Dmitri Soloviev	(United Kingdom) Sinead Kerr / John Kerr
