= 2011 Rostelecom Cup =

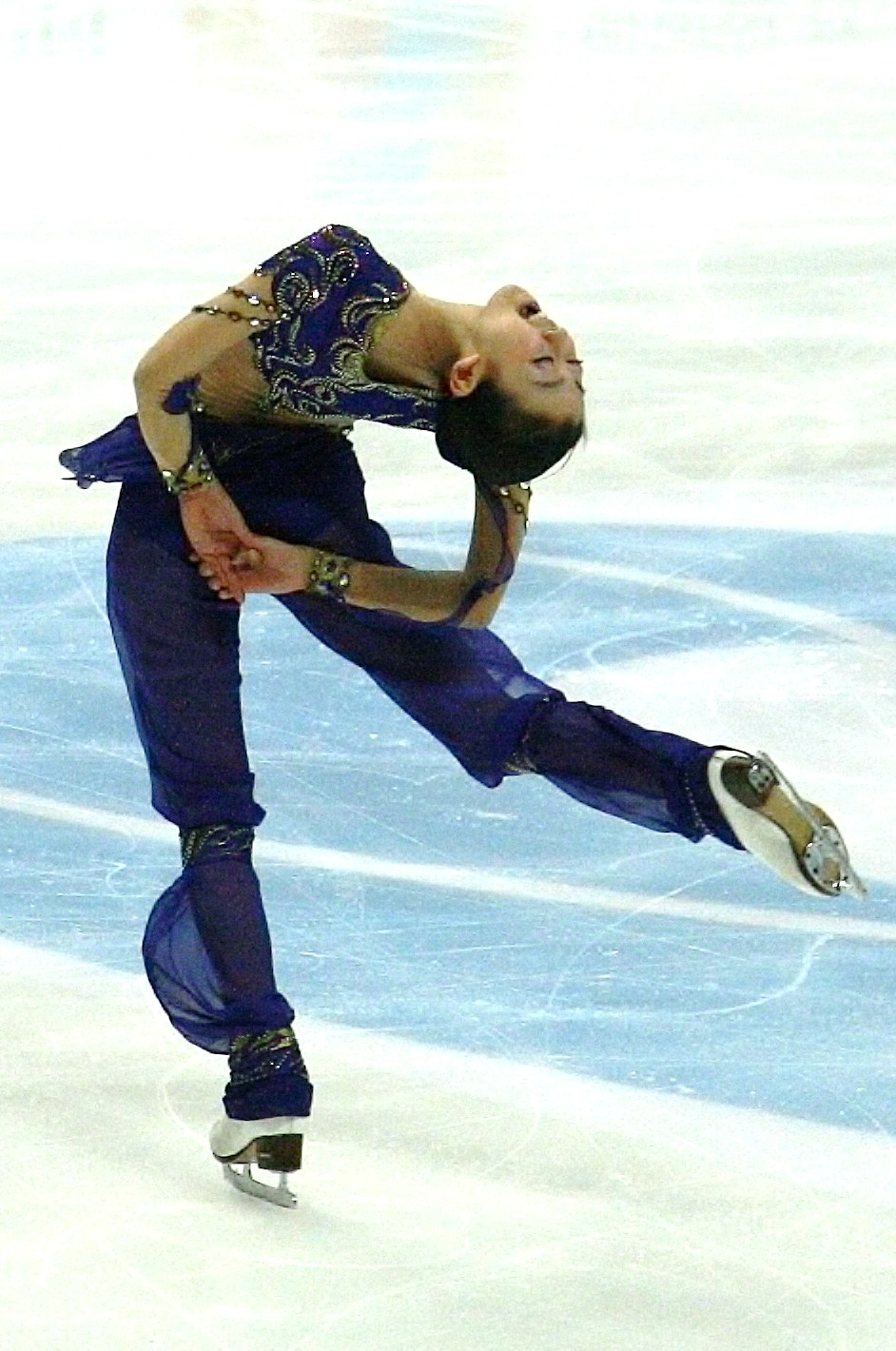
- Type: Grand Prix
- Date: November 24 – 27
- Season: 2011–12
- Location: Moscow
- Host: Figure Skating Federation of Russia
- Venue: Ice Palace Megasport

Champions
- Men's singles: (Japan) Yuzuru Hanyu
- Ladies' singles: (Japan) Mao Asada
- Pairs: (Germany) Aliona Savchenko / Robin Szolkowy
- Ice dance: (United States) Meryl Davis / Charlie White
- Previous: 2010 Rostelecom Cup
- Next: 2012 Rostelecom Cup
- Previous Grand Prix: 2011 Trophée Éric Bompard
- Next Grand Prix: 2011–12 Grand Prix Final

The 2011 Rostelecom Cup was the final event of six in the 2011–12 ISU Grand Prix of Figure Skating, a senior-level international invitational competition series. It was held at the Ice Palace Megasport in Moscow on November 24–27. Medals were awarded in the disciplines of men's singles, ladies' singles, pair skating, and ice dancing. Skaters earned points toward qualifying for the 2011–12 Grand Prix Final.

== Eligibility ==
Skaters who reached the age of 14 by July 1, 2011 were eligible to compete on the senior Grand Prix circuit.

In July 2011, minimum score requirements were added to the Grand Prix series and were set at two-thirds of the top scores at the 2011 World Championships. Prior to competing in a Grand Prix event, skaters were required to earn the following:

Discipline	Minimum
Men	168.60
Ladies	117.48
Pairs	130.71
Ice dancing	111.15

== Entries ==
The entries were as follows.

Country	Men	Ladies	Pairs	Ice dancing
Canada	Andrei Rogozine	Amélie Lacoste	Brittany Jones / Kurtis Gaskell	Kaitlyn Weaver / Andrew Poje
Czech Republic	Michal Březina			
Finland		Kiira Korpi		
France				Pernelle Carron / Lloyd Jones
Germany			Aliona Savchenko / Robin Szolkowy	
Italy			Stefania Berton / Ondřej Hotárek	
Japan	Yuzuru Hanyu	Mao Asada; Haruka Imai		
Lithuania				Isabella Tobias / Deividas Stagniūnas
Russia	Artur Gachinski; Sergei Voronov; Konstantin Menshov	Sofia Biryukova; Alena Leonova; Adelina Sotnikova	Katarina Gerboldt / Alexander Enbert; Yuko Kavaguti / Alexander Smirnov; Ksenia Stolbova / Fedor Klimov	Ekaterina Bobrova / Dmitri Soloviev; Ekaterina Riazanova / Ilia Tkachenko; Ekaterina Pushkash / Jonathan Guerreiro
Spain	Javier Fernández			
United States	Jeremy Abbott; Brandon Mroz	Rachael Flatt; Christina Gao; Agnes Zawadzki	Ashley Cain / Joshua Reagan	Meryl Davis / Charlie White

== Schedule ==
(Local time, UTC +04:00):

- Thursday, November 24
  - 10:30–15:15 – Official practices
- Friday, November 25
  - 08:00–13:25 – Official practices
  - 15:00–16:20 – Ladies' short
  - 16:45–17:45 – Pairs' short
  - 18:00–18:30 – Opening ceremony
  - 18:45–20:05 – Men's short
  - 20:25–21:45 – Short dance
- Saturday, November 26
  - 08:00–13:25 – Official practices
  - 14:00–15:30 – Ladies' free
  - 15:55–17:10 – Pairs' free
  - 17:30–19:10 – Men's free
  - 19:30–21:05 – Free dance
- Sunday, November 27
  - 08:00–10:35 – Official practices
  - 14:00–14:20 – Medal ceremonies
  - 14:35–17:00 – Exhibitions

== Results ==
=== Men ===
Rank	Name	Nation	Total points	SP		FS	
1	Yuzuru Hanyu	Japan	241.66	2	82.78	2	158.88
2	Javier Fernández	Spain	241.63	4	78.50	1	163.13
3	Jeremy Abbott	United States	229.08	1	83.54	5	145.54
4	Michal Březina	Czech Republic	226.35	3	79.01	3	147.34
5	Artur Gachinski	Russia	221.43	5	74.73	4	146.70
6	Andrei Rogozine	Canada	197.85	7	65.11	7	132.74
7	Sergei Voronov	Russia	197.19	8	61.15	6	136.04
8	Konstantin Menshov	Russia	192.68	9	60.91	8	131.77
9	Brandon Mroz	United States	185.49	6	69.35	9	116.14

=== Ladies ===
Rank	Name	Nation	Total points	SP		FS	
1	Mao Asada	Japan	183.25	1	64.29	1	118.96
2	Alena Leonova	Russia	180.45	2	63.91	2	116.54
3	Adelina Sotnikova	Russia	169.75	3	57.79	3	111.96
4	Sofia Biryukova	Russia	166.07	4	56.30	4	109.77
5	Kiira Korpi	Finland	160.92	5	55.81	5	105.11
6	Haruka Imai	Japan	154.76	6	55.20	6	99.56
7	Agnes Zawadzki	United States	149.38	7	53.81	8	95.57
8	Amélie Lacoste	Canada	148.48	9	50.63	7	97.85
9	Rachael Flatt	United States	147.63	8	53.36	9	94.27
10	Christina Gao	United States	117.77	10	39.64	10	78.13

=== Pairs ===
Rank	Name	Nation	Total points	SP		FS	
1	Aliona Savchenko / Robin Szolkowy	Germany	208.69	1	68.72	1	139.97
2	Yuko Kavaguti / Alexander Smirnov	Russia	197.84	2	65.17	2	132.67
3	Stefania Berton / Ondřej Hotárek	Italy	168.02	3	60.13	3	107.89
4	Ksenia Stolbova / Fedor Klimov	Russia	149.66	4	51.73	5	97.93
5	Katarina Gerboldt / Alexander Enbert	Russia	148.94	7	47.40	4	101.54
6	Ashley Cain / Joshua Reagan	United States	138.02	5	49.03	6	88.99
7	Brittany Jones / Kurtis Gaskell	Canada	136.54	6	47.76	7	88.78

=== Ice dancing ===
Rank	Name	Nation	Total points	SD		FD	
1	Meryl Davis / Charlie White	United States	179.06	1	69.94	1	109.12
2	Kaitlyn Weaver / Andrew Poje	Canada	161.18	2	64.45	2	96.73
3	Ekaterina Bobrova / Dmitri Soloviev	Russia	156.83	3	61.69	3	95.14
4	Ekaterina Riazanova / Ilia Tkachenko	Russia	132.73	4	55.83	5	76.90
5	Isabella Tobias / Deividas Stagniūnas	Lithuania	130.47	5	52.36	4	78.11
6	Pernelle Carron / Lloyd Jones	France	126.04	7	50.52	6	75.52
7	Ekaterina Pushkash / Jonathan Guerreiro	Russia	124.53	6	52.05	7	72.48
