= Katharina Gierok =

German pair skater (born 1992)

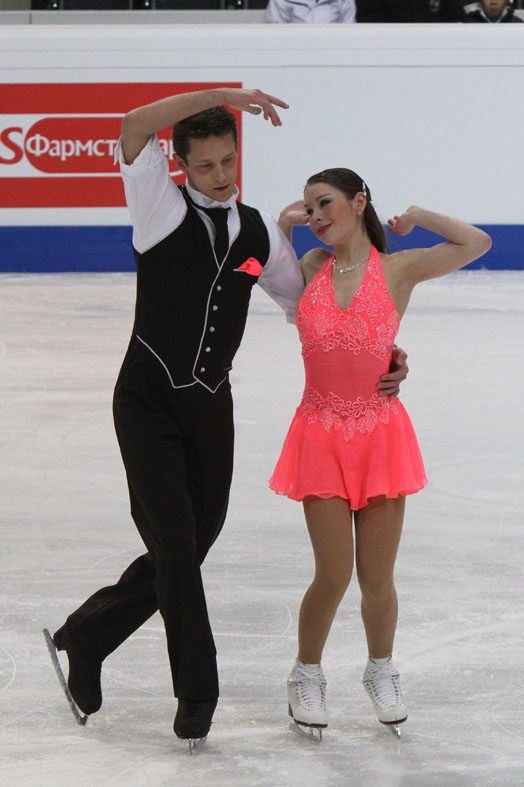

Personal information
- Full name: Katharina Gierok
- Born: 20 February 1992 (age 34) Krefeld, Germany
- Home town: Krefeld
- Height: 1.60 m (5 ft 3 in)

Figure skating career
- Country: Germany
- Coach: Karel Fajfr
- Skating club: EV Krefeld

Katharina Gierok (born 20 February 1992 in Krefeld, Germany) is a German pair skater. With former partner Florian Just, she is the 2011 German national bronze medalist. She previously competed in single skating and is the 2006–2007 German Junior national bronze medalist.

== Career ==
Gierok initially competed as a single skater. She made her senior debut during the 2007-2008 season, winning the 2008 NRW Trophy in Dortmund, Germany and placing 10th at the German Figure Skating Championships. After winning the third and final Junior Worlds Qualifier in Oberstdorf and being nominated as first alternate for the 2008 World Junior Figure Skating Championships, she had to end the season to undergo knee surgery. The German Skating Federation admitted Gierok to the German Junior Team for the season 2008 / 2009. This was the third season she was part of the DC Team envelope.

In spring 2010, she switched to pair skating, partnering with Florian Just. Karel Fajfr coaches the pair. They won silver at NRW Trophy and bronze at Warsaw Cup. At 2011 German Nationals, they won the bronze medal and were selected to compete at the European Championships. They finished 11th in their debut at the event, with a combined total of 118.06 points. Gierok and Just ended their partnership at the end of the 2011-12 season.

== Programs ==
With Just

Season	Short program	Free skating
2011–2012	Ratatouille	The Holiday by Hans Zimmer
2010–2011	Dark Angel by Edvin Marton	The Holiday by Hans Zimmer

== Competitive highlights ==
=== Pairs career with Just ===
Results
International
Event	2010–2011	2011–2012
Europeans	11th	
Bavarian Open	2nd	
Golden Spin		2nd
NRW Trophy	2nd	5th
Warsaw Cup	3rd	
National
German	3rd	

=== Singles career ===
Results
International
Event	2005–06	2006–07	2007–08	2008–09	2009–10
NRW Trophy			1st	11th J.	13th
International: Junior
JGP Belarus				12th	
JGP Great Britain			9th	20th	
Merano Cup			6th J.		
Golden Bear		2nd J.			
EYOF		6th J.			
Montfort Cup	2nd J.				
National
German Championships	4th J.	3rd J.	10th	8th	8th
Levels: N. = Novice; J. = Junior; JGP = Junior Grand Prix
