= Danielle Montalbano =

American-born former figure skater (born 1989)

Danielle Montalbano-Brezina
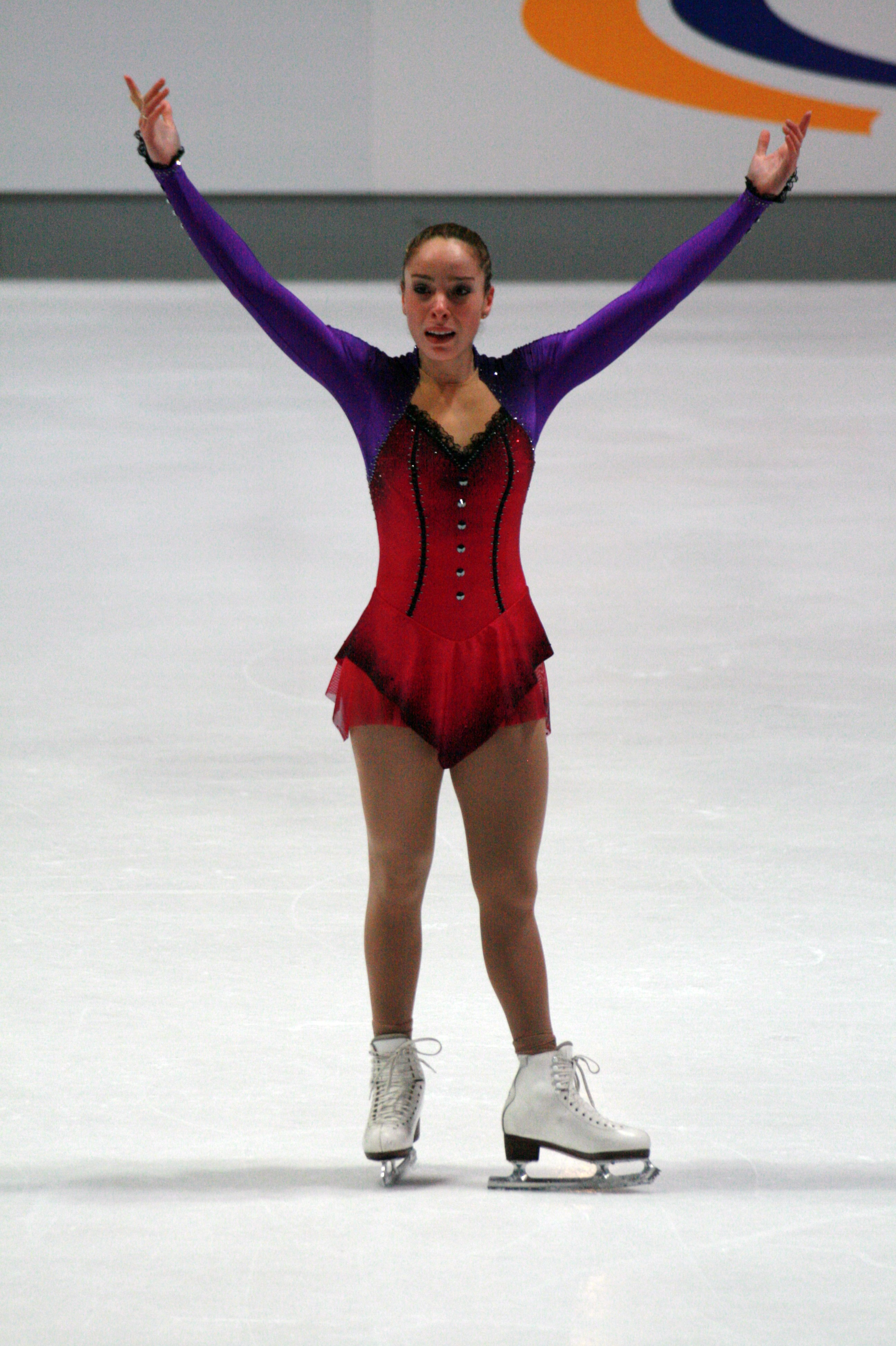
- Montalbano at the 2013 Nebelhorn Trophy

Personal information
- Native name: דניאל מונטלבאנו
- Full name: Danielle Leah (Montalbano) Brezina
- Born: January 23, 1989 (age 37) North Hempstead, New York
- Height: 1.55 m (5 ft 1 in)

Figure skating career
- Country: Israel
- Skating club: Kiryat Shmona
- Began skating: 1993
- Retired: September 10, 2015

Danielle Montalbano (Hebrew: דניאל מונטלבאנו; born January 23, 1989) is an American-born former figure skater, actress who competed for Israel. As a single skater, she is the 2014 Israeli national champion and 2014 Toruń Cup silver medalist. From 2009 to 2012, Montalbano competed in pair skating with partner Evgeni Krasnopolski. They medaled at four international events, including at the Golden Spin of Zagreb and Ice Challenge.

== Personal life ==
Danielle Montalbano was born on January 23, 1989, in Manhasset, New York. On May 19, 2015, it was announced that she was engaged to boyfriend and figure skater, Michal Brezina. They married on June 10, 2017. The couple have two children: a daughter, Naya Rose (born 2020) and a son, Noah Michal (born 2022).

== Career ==
In 2009, Montalbano teamed up with Evgeni Krasnopolski to compete in pairs. She dislocated her shoulder in practice at the 2011 European Championships, resulting in the pair withdrawing from the event. She broke her ankle in November 2012 while practicing a twist lift – leading to two surgeries, seven screws and a plate – and began rehab after six months. Montalbano and Krasnopolski were coached by Kyoko Ina. Their partnership ended in 2013.

In 2013, Montalbano began competing in ladies' singles. The screws and plate were removed from her ankle following the 2013 Nebelhorn Trophy. She won the 2014 Israeli national title and silver at the Toruń Cup. Montalbano was assigned to the 2014 European Championships, where she placed 35th. She then went to Ellenton, Florida, to train with a partner but broke her patella, putting her in a cast for a month. She teamed up with German pair skater Konrad Hocker-Scholler after a tryout in Oberstdorf.

Montalbano announced her retirement from competitive figure skating on September 10, 2015.

=== Feature films ===
Acting credits

| Year | Title | Role | Notes |
|---|---|---|---|
| 2019 | Broken Hearted | Figure Skater | |

== Programs ==
=== Single skating ===
| Season | Short program | Free skating |
|---|---|---|
| 2013–2014 | Libertango by Astor Piazzolla | Lara's Theme (from Doctor Zhivago) |

=== Pair skating ===
| Season | Short program | Free skating |
|---|---|---|
| 2012–2013 | Requiem for a Dream by Clint Mansell | Phantom of the Opera by Andrew Lloyd Webber |
| 2011–2012 | Assassin's Tango (from Mr. & Mrs. Smith) by John Powell | Nyah (from Mission: Impossible) by Hans Zimmer; When A Man Loves A Woman |
| 2010–2011 | James Bond theme | Nyah (from Mission: Impossible) by Hans Zimmer; When A Man Loves A Woman |
| 2009–2010 | Night Flight (from Crouching Tiger, Hidden Dragon) by Tan Dun | Nyah (from Mission: Impossible) by Hans Zimmer |

== Competitive highlights ==
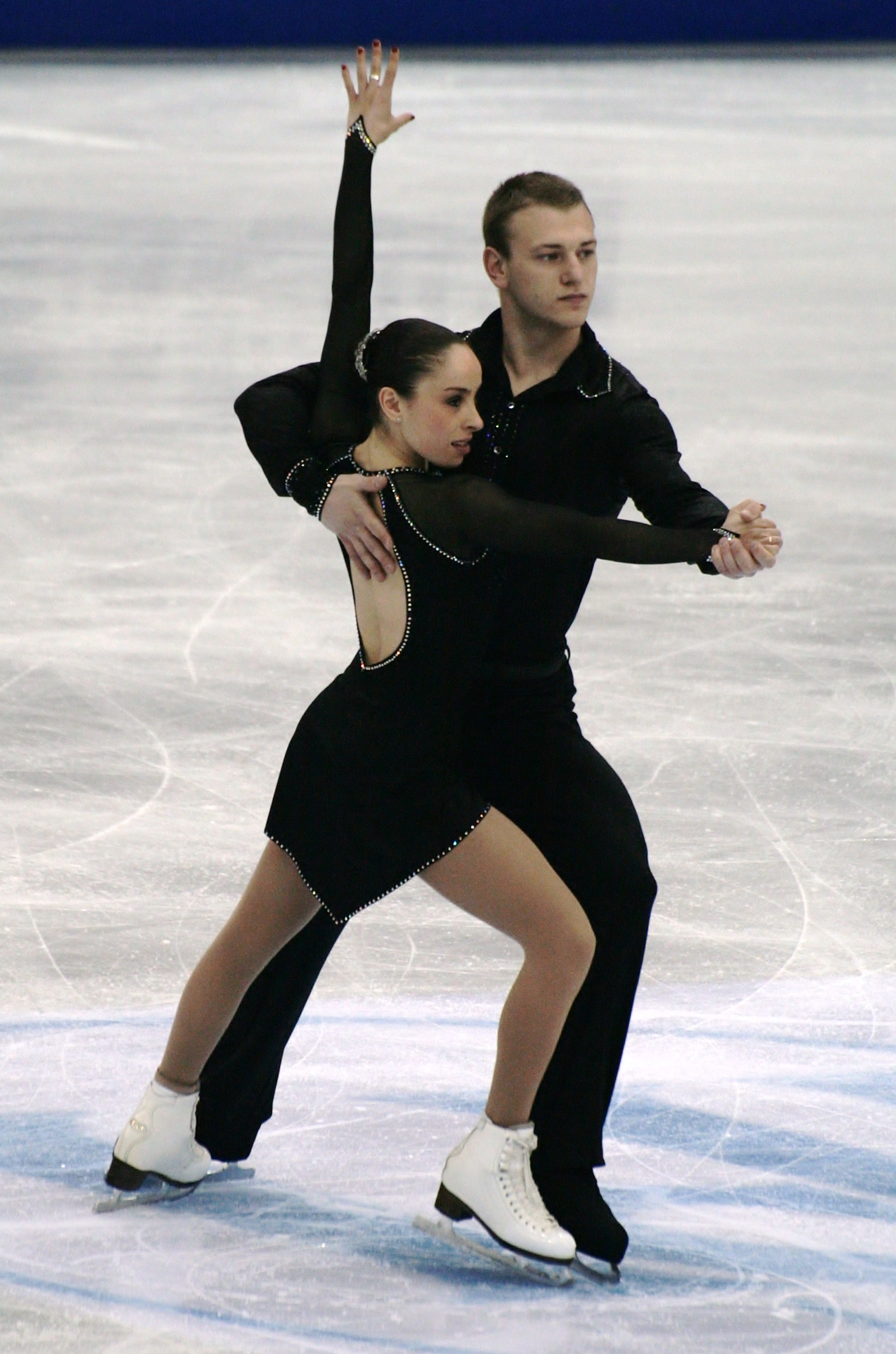
Montalbano with Krasnapolski in 2012

=== Single skating ===
International
| Event | 2013–14 |
|---|---|
| European Championships | 35th |
| Nebelhorn Trophy | 27th |
| Dragon Trophy | 14th |
| Golden Spin of Zagreb | 19th |
| Hellmut Seibt Memorial | 13th |
| New Year's Cup | 4th |
| Toruń Cup | 2nd |
National
| Israeli Championships | 1st |

=== Pair skating with Krasnopolski ===
GP: Grand Prix

International
| Event | 2009–10 | 2010–11 | 2011–12 | 2012–13 |
|---|---|---|---|---|
| World Champ. | 25th | 20th | 17th | |
| European Champ. | 18th | WD | 11th | |
| GP Skate America | | | | 7th |
| Cup of Nice | | | 11th | |
| Golden Spin | 4th | 6th | 3rd | |
| Ice Challenge | | 7th | 3rd | 3rd |
| Nebelhorn Trophy | | | 9th | 6th |
| Toruń Cup | | | 2nd | |
| U.S. Classic | | | | 6th |
WD = Withdrew
