= Maxim Shipov =

Russian-born figure skater (born 1987)

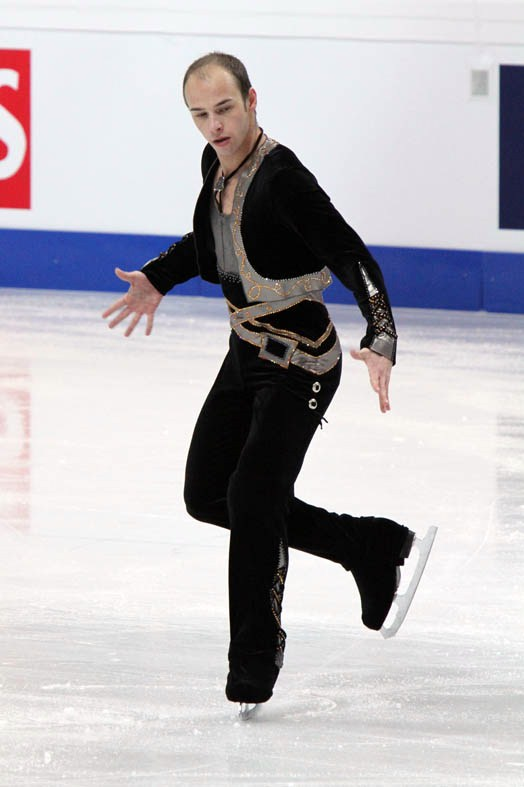
- Shipov at the 2011 European Championships

Personal information
- Native name: Максим Алексеевич Шипов
- Full name: Maxim Alexeyevich Shipov
- Born: 10 May 1987 (age 39) Moscow, Russian SFSR, Soviet Union
- Height: 1.67 m (5 ft 5 1/2 in)

Figure skating career
- Country: Israel
- Coach: Elena Tchaikovskaia, Vladimir Kotin, Marina Kudriavtseva, Igor Rusakov
- Skating club: Kochavim on the ice, Kiryat Shmona
- Began skating: 1992
- Retired: 2011

Maxim Alexeyevich Shipov (Russian: Максим Алексеевич Шипов; born 10 May 1987, in Moscow) is a Russian-born figure skater who competed mainly for Israel. Shipov represented Russia at one international competition, the 2005 Skate Israel. After switching to Israel and sitting out the mandatory wait period, he began appearing internationally for Israel in 2007. A three-time Israeli national champion, he competed at eight ISU Championships and qualified to the free skate at the 2011 European Championships in Bern, Switzerland.

== Programs ==
Season	Short program	Free skating
2010–11	Once Upon a Time in Mexico by Robert Rodriguez	Star Wars by John Williams
2009–10	Once Upon a Time in Mexico by Robert Rodriguez	Exodus
2008–09	Csárdás; Little Cavalry	Exodus
2007–08	The Godfather by Nino Rota	The Mummy by Jerry Goldsmith

== Competitive highlights ==
International
Event	05–06 (RUS)	06–07 (ISR)	07–08 (ISR)	08–09 (ISR)	09–10 (ISR)	10–11 (ISR)
World Champ.			34th	36th	43rd	29th
European Champ.			30th	26th	25th	23rd
Golden Spin			23rd		7th	7th
Nebelhorn Trophy				23rd	25th	11th
Nepela Memorial					19th	
NRW Trophy				11th		
Schäfer Memorial				16th		
Skate Israel	5th					
Universiade				22nd		
National
Israeli Champ.		1st	1st	1st		
Russian Jr. Champ.	10th					
