= Artur Gachinski =

Russian figure skater

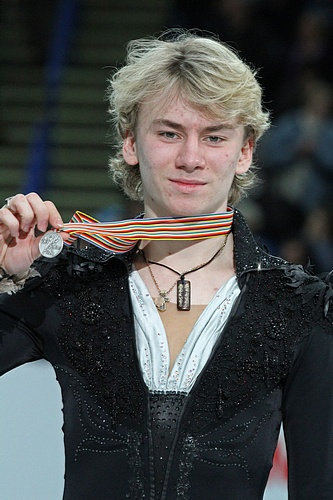
- Gachinski at the 2012 European Championships.

Personal information
- Full name: Artur Andreyevich Gachinski
- Other names: Artur Khil
- Born: 13 August 1993 (age 33) Moscow, Russia
- Height: 1.75 m (5 ft 9 in)

Figure skating career
- Country: Russia
- Skating club: CSKA Moscow
- Began skating: 2000
- Retired: December 24, 2015
Medal record
Representing Russia
Figure skating: Men's singles
World Championships
Bronze medal – third place	2011 Moscow	Men's singles
European Championships
Silver medal – second place	2012 Sheffield	Men's singles
Winter Universiade
Bronze medal – third place	2015 Granada	Men's singles
Russian Championships
Silver medal – second place	2011 Saransk	Men’s Singles
Silver medal – second place	2012 Saransk	Men’s Singles
World Junior Championships
Bronze medal – third place	2010 The Hague	Men's singles

Artur Andreyevich Gachinski (Russian: Артур Андреевич Гачинский; born 13 August 1993) is a Russian former figure skater. He is the 2011 World bronze medalist, the 2012 European silver medalist, the 2010 World Junior bronze medalist, and a two-time Russian national silver medalist (2011, 2012). He announced his retirement from competitive skating in December 2015, citing injuries.

== Personal life ==
Artur Andreyevich Gachinski was born on 13 August 1993 in Moscow. He received roller skates at age six but soon switched to ice skating. At age nine, Gachinski moved with his family to Saint Petersburg for training. Initially, he competed under his mother's surname Хиль, which was romanized as Khil or Hill. After a discussion with his family, he decided to take his father's surname, Gachinski. His mother is a painter.

== Career ==
=== Early career ===
Gachinski's parents brought him to a rink when he was six years old. At age nine, he was accepted as a pupil by Alexei Mishin in Saint Petersburg but was coached mainly by his wife, Tatiana Mishina, for the first few years.

In the 2005–2006 season, Gachinski won the junior bronze medal at the Russian Championships. In the 2006–2007 season, he was placed 8th on the junior level and 14th on the senior level at the Russian Championships.

=== 2007–2008 season ===
The 2007–2008 season was the first season in which Gachinski was old enough to compete in the ISU Junior Grand Prix series. He competed in two events, and was placed 4th in his debut in Romania and winning silver in Estonia. Gachinski qualified for the Junior Grand Prix Final, where he was placed 8th. He won the gold medal at the junior level at the 2007 Coupe de Nice and was placed 9th at the 2008 Russian Championships.

=== 2008–2009 season ===
Competing in the 2008–2009 ISU Junior Grand Prix, Gachinski won silver at the Spanish event and was placed fourth in Great Britain, thus qualifying for the 2008–2009 ISU Junior Grand Prix Final, where he finished 8th again. He made his senior international debut at the 2008 Golden Spin of Zagreb, where he was placed 8th. At the 2009 Russian Championships, Gachinski was placed 10th at the senior level and won the silver medal at the junior level. Although he was originally named to the team for the 2009 World Junior Championships, he withdrew from the event before the event began due to illness.

=== 2009–2010 season ===
The 2009–2010 season was Gachinski's third on the ISU Junior Grand Prix circuit. He won gold in Belarus and silver in Germany, qualifying him for the 2009–2010 ISU Junior Grand Prix Final, in which he was placed 6th. Gachinski won senior gold at the 2009 Coupe de Nice. At the 2010 Russian Championships, he was placed 13th in the senior level and the gold medalist in the junior level. In 6th after the short program at the 2010 World Junior Championships, Gachinski earned enough points in the free skate to take the bronze, despite popping his planned quad.

=== 2010–2011 season ===
Gachinski competed solely in the senior level in the 2010-2011 season. He began with wins at 2010 Finlandia Trophy and Coupe de Nice. He picked up a viral infection a week before 2010 Skate Canada. Gachinski finished 7th at the event, his debut on the senior Grand Prix. He was placed 6th in his second GP assignment, the 2010 Rostelecom Cup.

Gachinski won his first senior national medal, silver, at the 2011 Russian Championships behind Konstantin Menshov. Gachinski was assigned to his first European Championships where he finished fifth, ahead of Menshov, and was given Russia's sole berth to the men's event at the World Championships. He won the bronze in his first appearance at the event.

=== 2011–2012 season ===
In preparation for the 2011–2012 season, Gachinski took part in Mishin's training camps in Jaca (Spain), Tartu (Estonia), and Pinzolo (Italy) and worked with Stéphane Lambiel. Gachinski was assigned to 2011 Cup of China and 2011 Rostelecom Cup for the Grand Prix season. He won the short program but finished 5th overall at Cup of China, and also finished 5th at the Rostelecom Cup.

Gachinski won silver at the 2012 Russian Championships. At the 2012 European Championships, he was first in the short program and second in the long program, finishing with an overall score of 246.27 points. Gachinski won the silver medal behind teammate Evgeni Plushenko, who is also coached in Saint Petersburg by Alexei Mishin.

Gachinski changed his boots two weeks before the 2012 World Championships, affecting his preparation. He finished 18th at the event. After the event, Mishin said that Gachinski was not entirely ready and perhaps should have withdrawn. Gachinski was named in the Russian team to the 2012 World Team Trophy but withdrew from the event and was replaced by Zhan Bush.

=== 2012–2013 season ===
Gachinski struggled throughout the season both with physical and psychological issues. After he was placed ninth at the 2012 Skate Canada International and seventh at the 2012 Rostelecom Cup, he finished fourth at the 2013 Russian Championships and was not selected to compete at the 2013 European Championships. He finally won a gold medal in his final event of the season, the 2013 Triglav Trophy.

=== 2013–2014 season ===
In 2013–14, Gachinski started his season with a bronze medal at the 2013 Finlandia Trophy. After being placed eighth at the 2013 Skate America and sixth at the 2013 Rostelecom Cup, he finished sixth at Russian nationals and was not included in the Russian team to the European Championships, Winter Olympics, or World Championships.

Gachinski moved to Moscow on 6 January 2014 and began working with Tatiana Tarasova, Alexander Uspenski and Maxim Zavozin.

== Programs ==
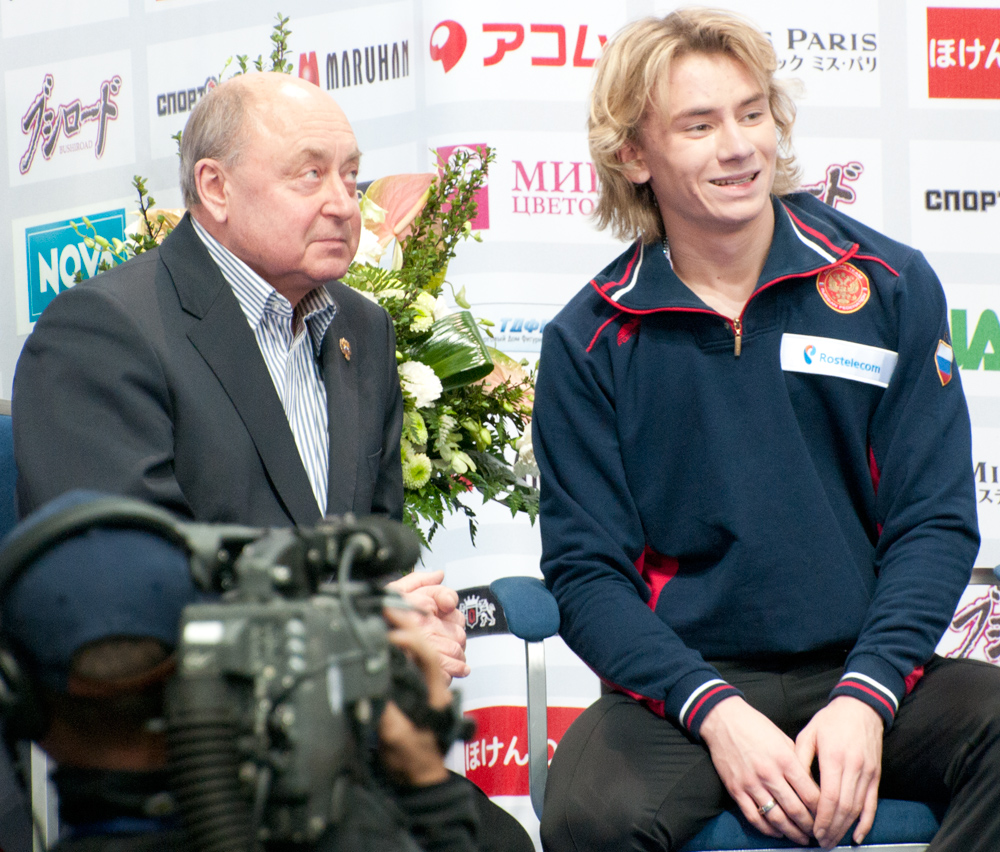
Gachinski with his former coach Alexei Mishin

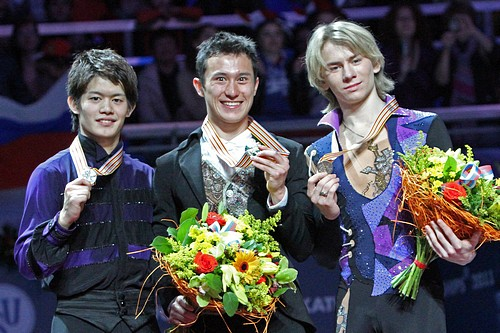
Gachinski at the 2011 World Championships

Season	Short program	Free skating	Exhibition
2015–2016	Straight to Memphis by Club des Belugas by choreo. by Maxim Staviski	Balada de la Trompeta by Raphael choreo. by Maxim Staviski	
2014–2015	Cry Me a River performed by Michael Bublé	Rhapsody on a Theme of Paganini by Sergei Rachmaninoff	
2013–2014	Flamenco choreo. by Jeffrey Buttle, Artur Gachinski	Anna Karenina by Dario Marianelli choreo. by Juri Smekalov	
2012–2013	The Highlander	Beethoven's 5 Secrets by OneRepublic (orig: Symphony No. 5 in C minor by Ludwig van Beethoven)	
2011–2012	St. Louis Blues choreo. by Tom Dickson	"The Demon": Prelude from Fahrenheit 451; Louis' Revenge & Santiago Waltz from Interview with the Vampire; Bram Stoker's Dracula by Wojciech Kilar; The Red Violin choreo. by Tom Dickson	
2010–2011	Money; The Great Gig in the Sky by Pink Floyd	The Bolt by Dmitri Shostakovich	Susanna by Adriano Celentano; Smooth Criminal by Michael Jackson
2009–2010	Adagio in G minor by Remo Giazotto, Tomaso Albinoni	The Mirror - Narcissus by Keiko Matsui	
2008–2009	Assassin's Tango (from Mr. & Mrs. Smith) by John Powell	The Mirror - Narcissus by Keiko Matsui	Adagio in G minor by Remo Giazotto, Tomaso Albinoni
2007–2008	Flamenco medley by unknown	Romeo and Juliet by Nino Rota	Medley by Elvis Presley

== Competitive highlights ==
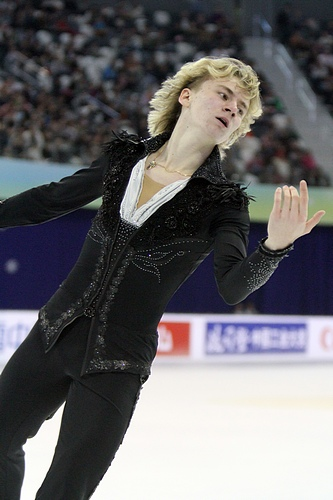
Gachinski at the 2011 Cup of China

=== 2007–present ===
International
Event	2007–08	2008–09	2009–10	2010–11	2011–12	2012–13	2013–14	2014–15
Worlds				3rd	18th			
Europeans				5th	2nd			
GP Cup of China					5th			
GP Rostelecom				6th	5th	7th	6th	8th
GP Skate America							8th	9th
GP Skate Canada				7th		9th		
Universiade								3rd
Finlandia				1st			3rd	
Cup of Nice	1st J.		1st	1st				
Golden Spin		8th					2nd	
Triglav Trophy						1st		
International: Junior
Junior Worlds			3rd					
JGP Final	8th	8th	6th					
JGP Belarus			1st					
JGP Estonia	2nd							
JGP Germany	4th		2nd					
JGP Spain		2nd						
JGP U.K.		4th						
National
Russian Champ.	9th	10th	13th	2nd	2nd	4th	6th	6th
Russian Junior		2nd	1st					
Team events
Japan Open					2nd T (2nd P)			

=== 2003–2007 ===
Event	2004–05	2005–06	2006–07
National
Russian Champ.			14th
Russian Junior Champ.	13th	3rd	8th

== Detailed results ==
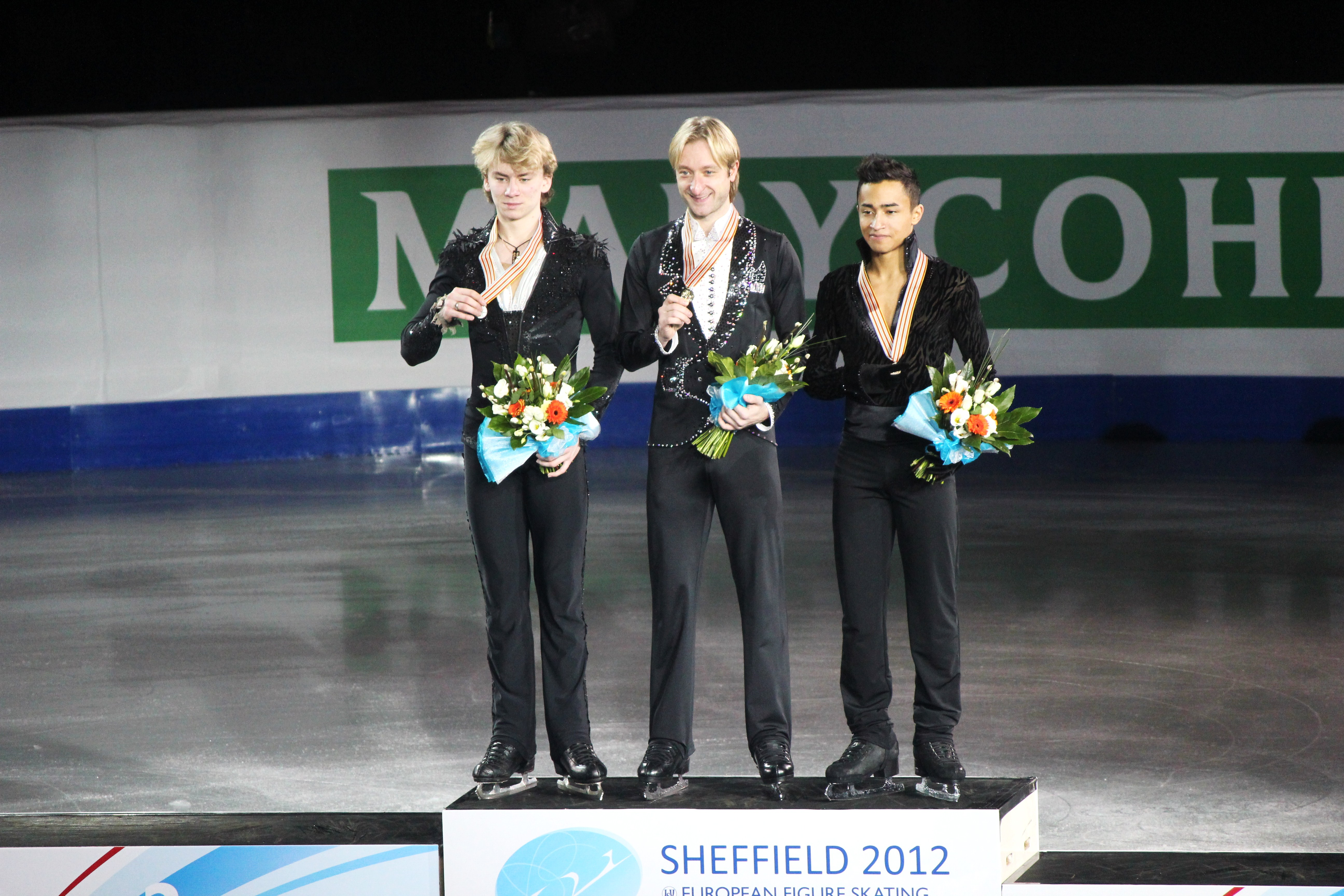
Gachinski on the podium at the 2012 European Championships

(Small medals for short and long programs are awarded only at ISU Championships.)

2011–2012 season
Date	Event	SP	FS	Total
March 26 - April 1, 2012	2012 World Championships	16; 68.50	18; 136.56	18; 205.06
January 23–29, 2012	2012 European Championships	1; 84.80	2; 161.47	2; 246.27
December 25–29, 2011	2012 Russian Championships	2; 83.52	2; 166.06	2; 249.58
November 18–21, 2011	2011 Cup of Russia	5; 74.73	4; 146.70	5; 221.43
October 29–31, 2011	2011 Cup of China	1; 81.64	6; 140.90	5; 222.54
2010–2011 season
Date	Event	SP	FS	Total
April 27-May 1, 2011	2011 World Championships	4; 78.34	3; 163.52	3; 241,86
January 24–30, 2011	2011 European Championships	3; 73.76	6; 142.31	5; 216.07
December 26–29, 2010	2011 Russian Championships	9; 64.75	2; 146.53	2; 211.28
November 18–21, 2010	2010 Cup of Russia	4; 72.41	7; 130.53	6; 202.94
October 29–31, 2010	2010 Skate Canada International	7; 66.57	7; 137.51	7; 204.08
October 13–17, 2010	2010 Coupe de Nice	1; 77.91	1; 156.25	1; 234.16
October 8–10, 2010	2010 Finlandia Trophy	3; 63.54	1; 142.98	1; 206.52
