= Figure skating at the 2013 Winter Universiade =

- Type: Senior international
- Date: 11 – 15 December
- Season: 2013–14
- Location: Trento, Italy
- Venue: Trento Ghiaccio Arena

Champions
- Men's singles: (China) Song Nan
- Ladies' singles: (Russia) Sofia Biryukova
- Pairs: (Russia) Ksenia Stolbova / Fedor Klimov
- Ice dance: (France) Pernelle Carron / Lloyd Jones
- Previous: 2011 Winter Universiade
- Next: 2015 Winter Universiade

Figure skating at the 2013 Winter Universiade was held at the Trento Ghiaccio Arena in Trento from December 11 to 15, 2013.

== Medalists ==
Discipline	Gold	Silver	Bronze
Men's singles	Song Nan (CHN)	Gordei Gorshkov (RUS)	Akio Sasaki (JPN)
Ladies' singles	Sofia Biryukova (RUS)	Valentina Marchei (ITA)	Sofia Mishina (RUS)
Pairs	Ksenia Stolbova / Fedor Klimov (RUS)	Evgenia Tarasova / Vladimir Morozov (RUS)	Nicole Della Monica / Matteo Guarise (ITA)
Ice dancing	Pernelle Carron / Lloyd Jones (FRA)	Julia Zlobina / Alexei Sitnikov (AZE)	Victoria Sinitsina / Ruslan Zhiganshin (RUS)

== Medal table ==
Rank	Nation	Gold	Silver	Bronze	Total
1	Russia	2	2	2	6
2	China	1	0	0	1
2	France	1	0	0	1
4	Italy	0	1	1	2
5	Azerbaijan	0	1	0	1
6	Japan	0	0	1	1
Totals (6 entries)		4	4	4	12
