= Alexander Enbert =

Russian pair skater (born 1989)

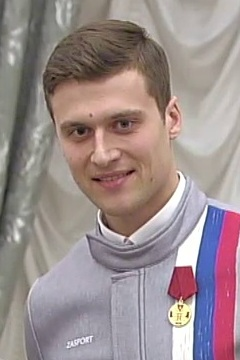
- Enbert in 2018

Personal information
- Native name: Александр Юрьевич Энберт
- Full name: Alexander Yuryevich Enbert
- Born: 17 April 1989 (age 37) Leningrad, Russian SFSR, Soviet Union
- Height: 1.89 m (6 ft 2 in)

Figure skating career
- Country: Russia
- Partner: Natalia Zabiiako
- Coach: Nina Mozer, Vladislav Zhovnirski, Robin Szolkowy
- Skating club: Sochi FSC
- Began skating: 1995
- Retired: February 26, 2020
Medal record
Figure skating: Pairs
Representing Olympic Athletes from Russia
Olympic Games
Silver medal – second place	2018 Pyeongchang	Team
Representing Russia (with Zabiiako)
World Championships
Bronze medal – third place	2019 Saitama	Pairs
World Team Trophy
Bronze medal – third place	2019 Fukuoka	Team

Alexander Yuryevich Enbert (Russian: Александр Юрьевич Энберт; born 17 April 1989) is a Russian retired pair skater. With Natalya Zabiyako, he was the 2019 World bronze medalist, 2018 European bronze medalist, 2018 Grand Prix of Helsinki champion, 2018 NHK Trophy champion, 2016 Rostelecom Cup silver medalist, and three-time Russian national medalist.

From 2010 to 2014, he competed with Katarina Gerboldt. The pair placed fourth at the 2011 European Championships.

== Personal life ==
On 29 February 2020, three days after the retirement, Ebert married his longtime girlfriend Alesya Danchyuk in Saint Petersburg.

== Early career ==
Early in his career, Enbert skated with Viktoria Kazantseva. The pair placed 12th at the 2006 World Junior Championships.

In 2007, Enbert began a partnership with Ksenia Ozerova, coached by Oksana Kazakova. During the 2008–09 season, they won silver and bronze medals on the Junior Grand Prix series. This qualified them for the Junior Grand Prix Final, however, they withdrew after the short program. They made their senior international debut at the 2008 Cup of Russia, where they placed 5th. They were given a berth to the 2009 World Championships after Lubov Iliushechkina / Nodari Maisuradze withdrew due to injury. They finished 24th at the event.

The following season, Ozerova/Enbert won silver at the 2009 Cup of Nice, finished 8th at the 2009 Skate Canada International and 6th at Russian senior nationals. They split up at the end of the season.

== Partnership with Gerboldt ==
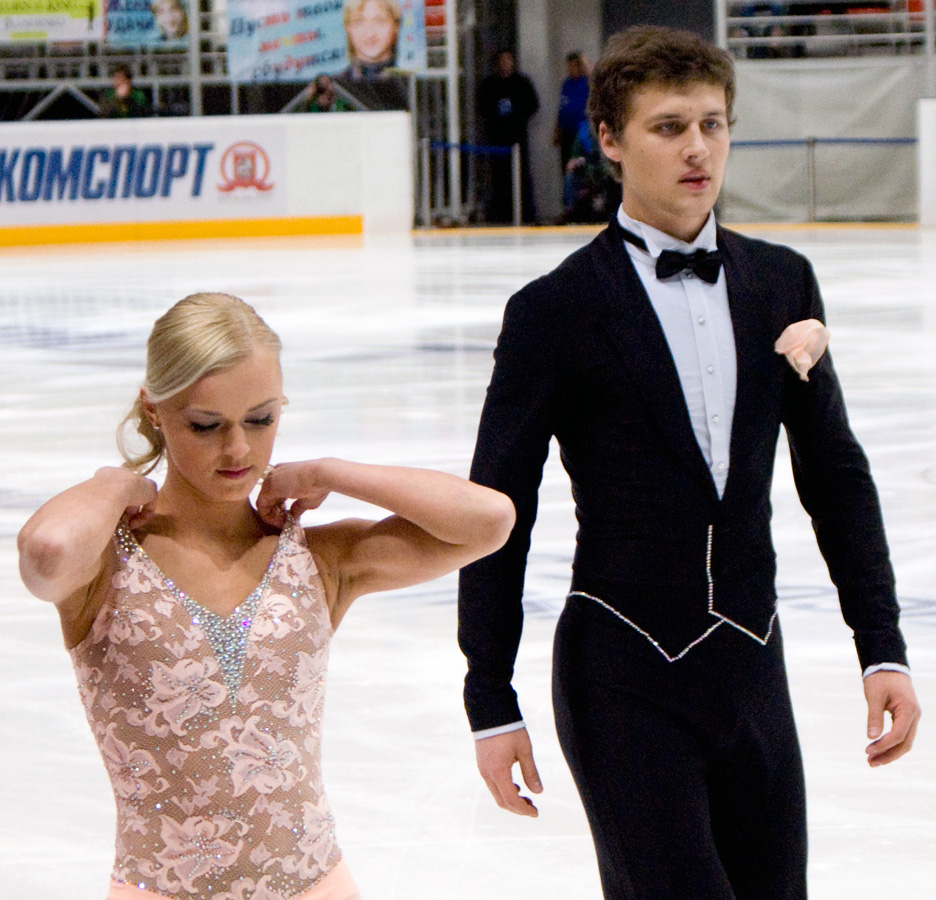
Gerboldt/Enbert during the short program at 2010 Cup of Russia

Enbert's coaches suggested that he try out with single skater Katarina Gerboldt, whom he knew since childhood. In March 2010, it was announced that he and Gerboldt had formed a partnership. They were originally coached by Tamara Moskvina and Artur Dmitriev at Yubileyny Sports Palace in Saint Petersburg.

During the 2010–11 season, Gerboldt/Enbert made their international debut at the 2010 Cup of Nice, which they won. They finished fourth at the 2010 Cup of Russia, their sole Grand Prix event of the season. At the 2011 Russian Nationals, they placed fourth in the short program and fifth in the long, to finish fourth overall. As Tatiana Volosozhar / Maxim Trankov were ineligible to compete at the 2011 European Championships, Gerboldt/Enbert were named in the team for the event. They placed fifth in the short program with a new personal best score of 57.50, fourth in the free program, also with a new personal best (112.45), and finished fourth overall with 169.95 points, their best combined total.

In the 2011–12 season, Gerboldt/Enbert competed in one Grand Prix event, the 2011 Cup of Russia. In 2012–13, they were assigned to Skate Canada but withdrew due to injury – Gerboldt tore a ligament. Coached by Oleg Vasiliev, Gerboldt/Enbert returned to competition in the 2013–14 season but split in April 2014.

== Partnership with Davankova ==
On 30 April 2014, Nina Mozer announced that Enbert and Vasilisa Davankova had formed a partnership, coached by her in Moscow. Davankova said they would begin training on 12 May. The pair performed an exhibition a few weeks later at a charity gala in Luzhniki.

== Partnership with Zabiiako ==
=== 2015–16 season ===
In July 2015, the Russian media reported that Enbert had teamed up with Natalia Zabiiako and that she had been released to represent Russia internationally.

Zabiiako/Enbert's international debut came in October 2015 at the 2015 Mordovian Ornament, a Challenger Series (CS) event at which they won a silver medal. In November, the pair appeared for the first time on the Grand Prix series, placing fifth at the 2015 Rostelecom Cup. In early December, they finished fourth at the 2015 CS Golden Spin of Zagreb and third in the CS standings. At the 2016 Russian Championships, the pair placed fifth in both segments and overall.

=== 2016–17 season ===
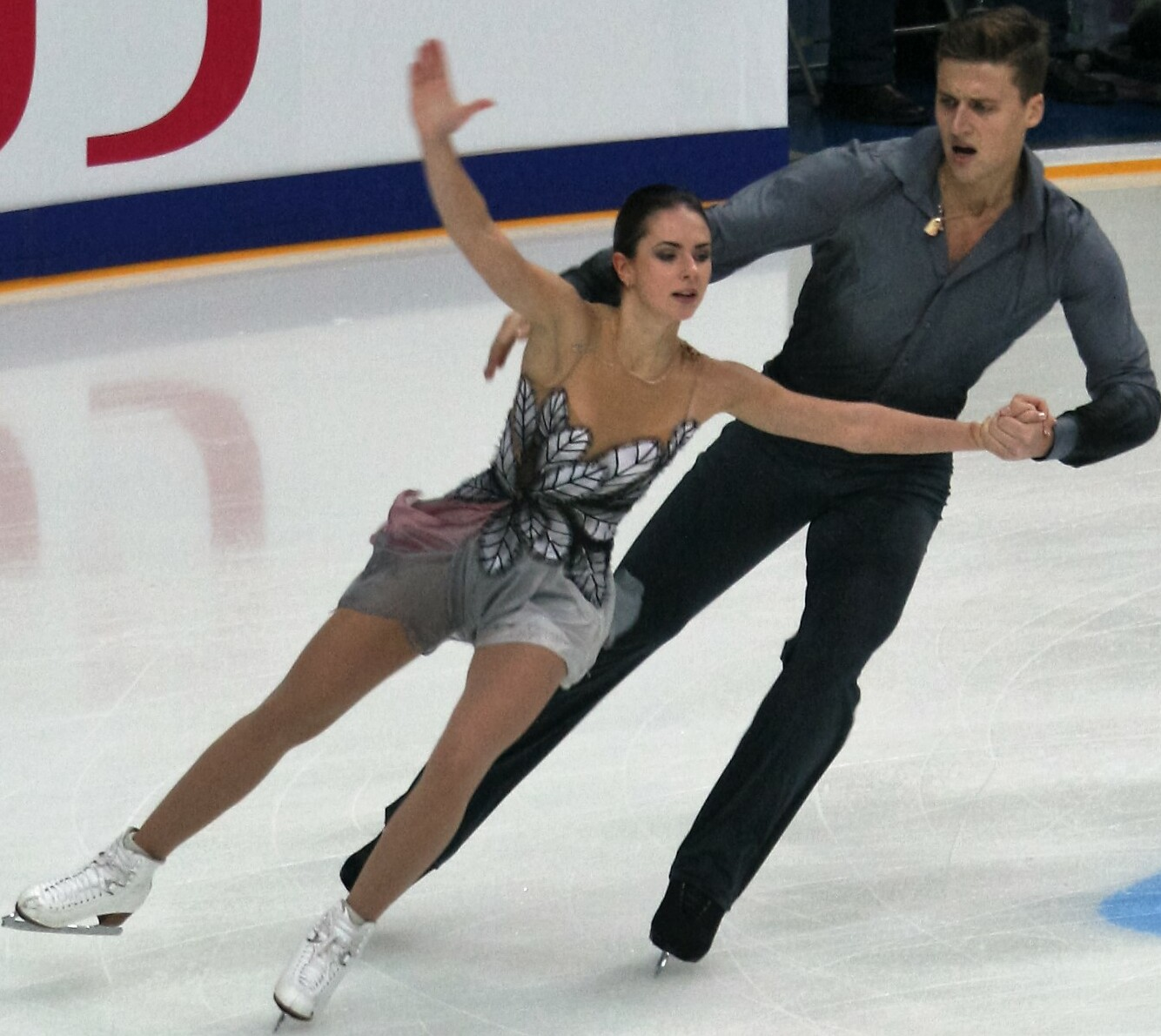
Zabiiako and Enbert at the 2016 Rostelecom Cup

Zabiiako/Enbert started the 2016–17 season on the Challenger Series, obtaining the bronze medal at the 2016 CS Ondrej Nepela Memorial. Turning to the Grand Prix series, the pair won the silver medal at the 2016 Rostelecom Cup, having placed first in the short and second in the free behind Germany's Aliona Savchenko / Bruno Massot. They then placed fourth at the 2016 Trophée de France. These results didn't qualify them to the 2016–17 Grand Prix Final but they were the 1st alternates and were called up after Aliona Savchenko / Bruno Massot withdrew. Zabijako/Enbert placed fourth at the 2016–17 Grand Prix Final after placing fifth in both the short program and the free skate.

In December 2016 Zabiiako and Enbert won the bronze medal at the 2017 Russian Championships after placing third in both the short program and the free skate. In January 2017, they competed at the 2017 European Championships where they finished in fifth overall, after placing fifth in both the short program and the free skate. In March 2017 Zabijako/Enbert finished in twelfth place at the 2017 World Championships.

=== 2017–18 season ===
Zabiiako/Enbert began their season on the Challenger Series, winning gold at both the 2017 CS Lombardia Trophy and 2017 CS Ondrej Nepela Trophy.

In their first Grand Prix event of the season, Zabiiako/Enbert placed fourth at 2017 Skate Canada after placing fourth in both the short program and free skate. In their second Grand Prix event at 2017 Skate America, the pair placed fourth overall after ranking fourth in the short program and fifth in the free skate. The pair did not quality for the 2017-18 Grand Prix Final.

In December 2017, Zabiiako/Enbert won their 3rd 2017–18 Challenger Series gold medal at the 2017 CS Golden Spin of Zagreb. A few weeks, later they placed third at the 2018 Russian Championships, earning their place on the Russian national team for the 2018 Winter Olympics.

In January 2018, after placing second in the short program and third in the free skate, the pair won the bronze medal at the 2018 European Championships.

At the 2018 Winter Olympics in Pyeongchang, South Korea, Zabiiako/Enbert placed third in the free skate portion of the team event, earning a silver medal as part of the Russian team. They then placed seventh at the pairs event with a personal best score of 212.88 points.

In March, the team placed fourth in the short program at the 2018 World Championships, and ended up in fourth overall after a sixth-place free skate.

=== 2018–19 season ===
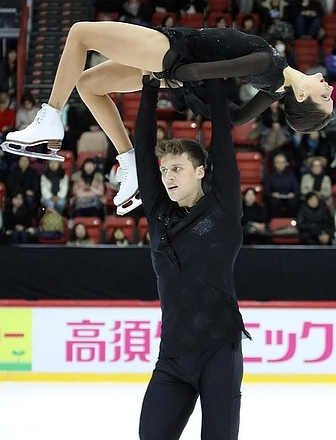
Zabiiako and Enbert at the 2018 Grand Prix of Helsinki

Zabiiako/Enbert started their season in mid September at the 2018 CS Lombardia Trophy winning the gold ahead of teammates Aleksandra Boikova / Dmitrii Kozlovskii.

In early November, Zabiiako/Enbert competed at the 2018 Grand Prix of Helsinki, where they ranked second in the short program and first in the free skate to capture their first Grand Prix title, beating silver medalists, Nicole Della Monica / Matteo Guarise, by about 13 points. Zabiiako described their first Grand Prix victory as "a good experience for us." One week later, Zabiiako/Enbert won their second Grand Prix title medal at the 2018 NHK Trophy with a personal best score of 214.14 points. They placed first in both programs and beat the silver medalist, Peng Cheng / Jin Yang, by about 7 points.

With two Grand Prix gold medals they qualified for the 2018–19 Grand Prix Final. In second after the short program, an underrotated side-by-side jump from Zabiyako followed by an aborted lift toward the end of their program dropped them to fourth in the free skate and fourth overall. Zabiiako remarked that "probably some parts of our program were not quite ready yet, but we will improve them." At the 2019 Russian Championships, the duo won the silver medal, placing second in both the short and free programs. Enbert said "we’re pleased with what we showed in the free skating. We fixed some issues from the Final and skated at a higher level here in Saransk."

Zabiiako/Enbert were named to Russia's team for the 2019 European Championships, but withdrew on December 27, 2018, due to medical issues. They were replaced by Daria Pavliuchenko / Denis Khodykin.

Zabiiako and Ebert were declared fit to compete one week prior to the 2019 World Championships, in Saitama, Japan. They placed fourth in both segments to end up in third overall and win their first ever World Championship medal. They concluded their season at the 2019 World Team Trophy, winning the bronze medal as part of the Russian Team.

=== Retirement ===
Zabiiako/Enbert did not compete during the 2019–20 figure skating season due to Enbert's illness. On February 26, 2020, it was announced that while Enbert was healthy again, the pair would not be returning to competition. In the same year, a documentary film "Unbroken" was released about the couples A. Cain-Gribble / T. LeDuc (USA) and N. Zabiiako / A. Enbert (Russia).

== Television ==
He appeared on the seventh, eighth, and ninth seasons of the ice show contest Ice Age. He danced with Olga Kuzmina on season 7, actress Agata Muceniece on season 8, and Ukrainian-Russian singer Regina Todorenko on season 9.

== Programs ==
=== With Zabiyako ===
Season	Short program	Free skating	Exhibition
2018–2019	Alexander Nevsky by Sergei Prokofiev choreo. by Peter Tchernyshev	Toi et Moi by Igor Krutoi choreo. by Pasquale Camerlengo	Tango in Ebony by Maksim Mrvica
2017–18	Summer of '42 by Michel Legrand choreo. by Igor Tchiniaev	The Sleeping Beauty by Pyotr Ilyich Tchaikovsky choreo. by Giuseppe Arena	"Can't Help Falling in Love" by Hugo Peretti, Luigi Creatore, George David Weiss covered by Chris Isaak
2016–17	The Blizzard by Georgy Sviridov	"Cry Me a River" by Michael Bublé	Juno and Avos by Alexey Rybnikov; "Une vie d'amour" performed by Valery Leontiev
2015–16	Juno and Avos by Alexey Rybnikov	God's Thunder by Georges Garvarentz	Juno and Avos by Alexey Rybnikov

=== With Davankova ===
Season	Short program	Free skating
2014–15	Ave Maria performed by Shirley Bassey	Doctor Zhivago Suite by Maurice Jarre

=== With Gerboldt ===
Season	Short program	Free skating	Exhibition
2013–14	"Historia de un Amor" by Pérez Prado	Angels & Demons by Hans Zimmer	
2011–12	Gopher Mambo	The Umbrellas of Cherbourg by Michel Legrand choreo. by Natalia Bestemianova, Igor Bobrin	
2010–11	Charade by Henry Mancini performed by Liberace	"Rhapsody in Rock" by Robert Wells	"I Hate You Then I Love You" by Celine Dion, Luciano Pavarotti

=== Earlier partnerships ===
with Ozerova

Season	Short program	Free skating
2008–10	Don Quixote by Ludwig Minkus	"Dark Eyes" performed by Stanley Black Orchestra

with Kazantseva

Season	Short program	Free skating
2005–06	My Fair Lady by Frederick Loewe	Die Fledermaus by Johann Strauss II

== Competitive highlights ==
GP: Grand Prix; CS: Challenger Series; JGP: Junior Grand Prix

=== With Zabiiako ===
International
Event	15–16	16–17	17–18	18–19
Olympics			7th	
Worlds		12th	4th	3rd
Europeans		5th	3rd	WD
GP Final		4th		4th
GP Finland				1st
GP France		4th		
GP NHK Trophy				1st
GP Rostelecom	5th	2nd		
GP Skate America			4th	
GP Skate Canada			4th	
CS Golden Spin	4th		1st	
CS Lombardia			1st	1st
CS Mordovian	2nd			
CS Nepela Trophy		3rd	1st	
National
Russian Champ.	5th	3rd	3rd	2nd
Team events
Olympics			2nd T	
World Team Trophy				3rd T 2nd P

=== With Davankova ===
International
Event	2014–15
GP Rostelecom Cup	WD
National
Russian Championships	6th

=== With Gerboldt ===
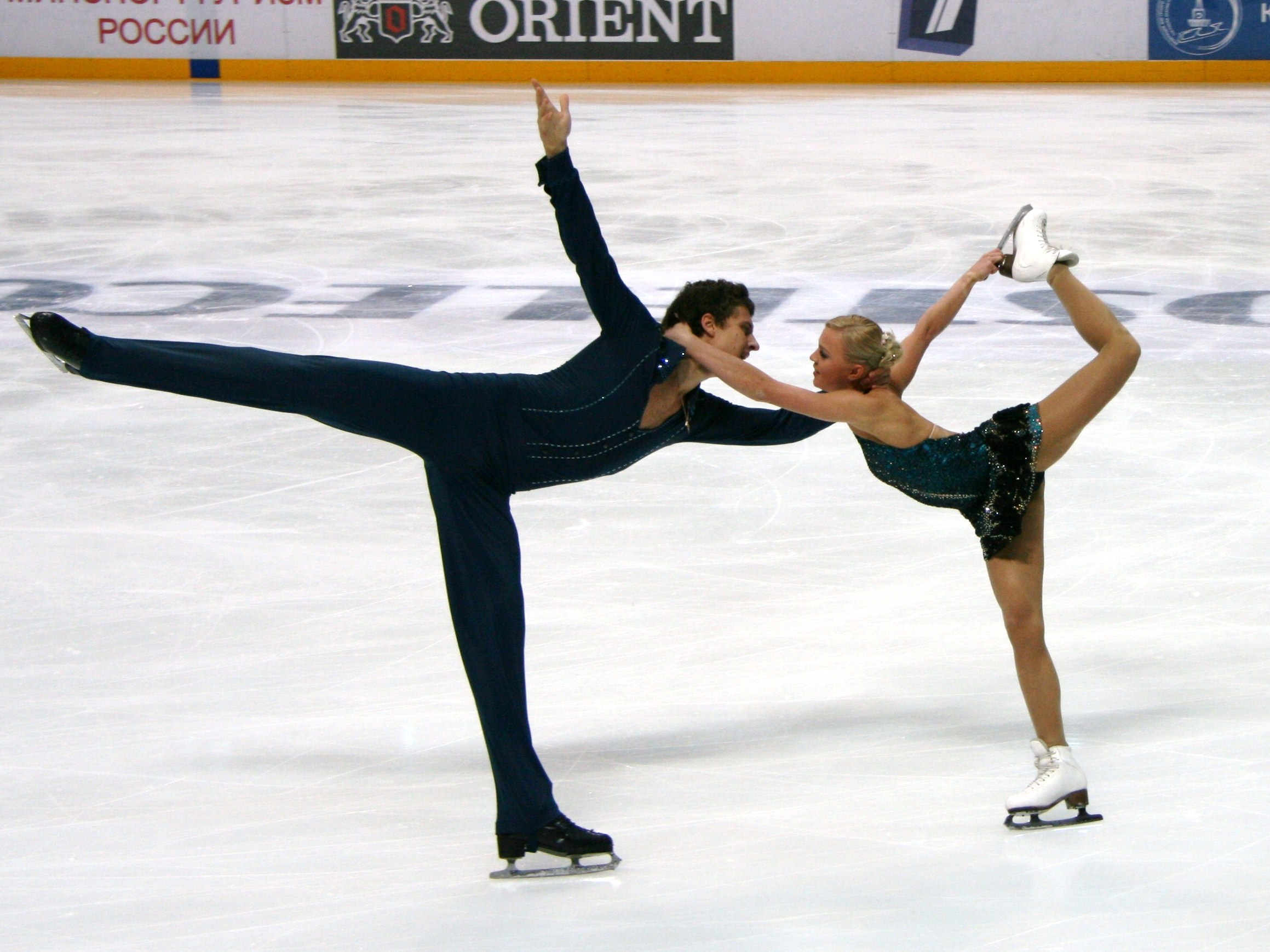
Gerboldt/Enbert perform their long program at 2010 Cup of Russia.

International
Event	10–11	11–12	12–13	13–14
European Champ.	4th			
GP Cup of Russia	4th	5th		
GP Skate Canada			WD	
Bavarian Open		2nd		2nd
Cup of Nice	1st	2nd		
Lombardia Trophy				3rd
National
Russian Champ.	4th	4th		7th

=== With Ozerova ===
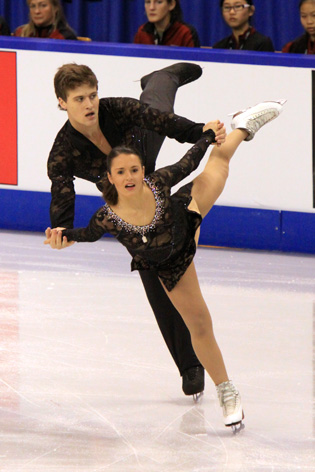
Enbert with former partner Ksenia Ozerova at 2009 Skate Canada International

International
Event	2007–08	2008–09	2009–10
World Champ.		24th	
GP Cup of Russia		5th	
GP Skate Canada			8th
Cup of Nice			2nd
Universiade		2nd	
International: Junior
JGP Final		WD	
JGP Belarus		2nd	6th
JGP Czech Republic		3rd	
National
Russian Champ.			6th
Russian Junior Champ.	6th		

=== With Kazantseva ===
International: Junior
Event	2005–06	2006–07
World Junior Champ.	12th	
JGP Norway		8th
National
Russian Junior Champ.	6th	6th

== Detailed results ==
Small medals for short and free programs awarded only at ISU Championships. At team events, medals awarded for team results only.

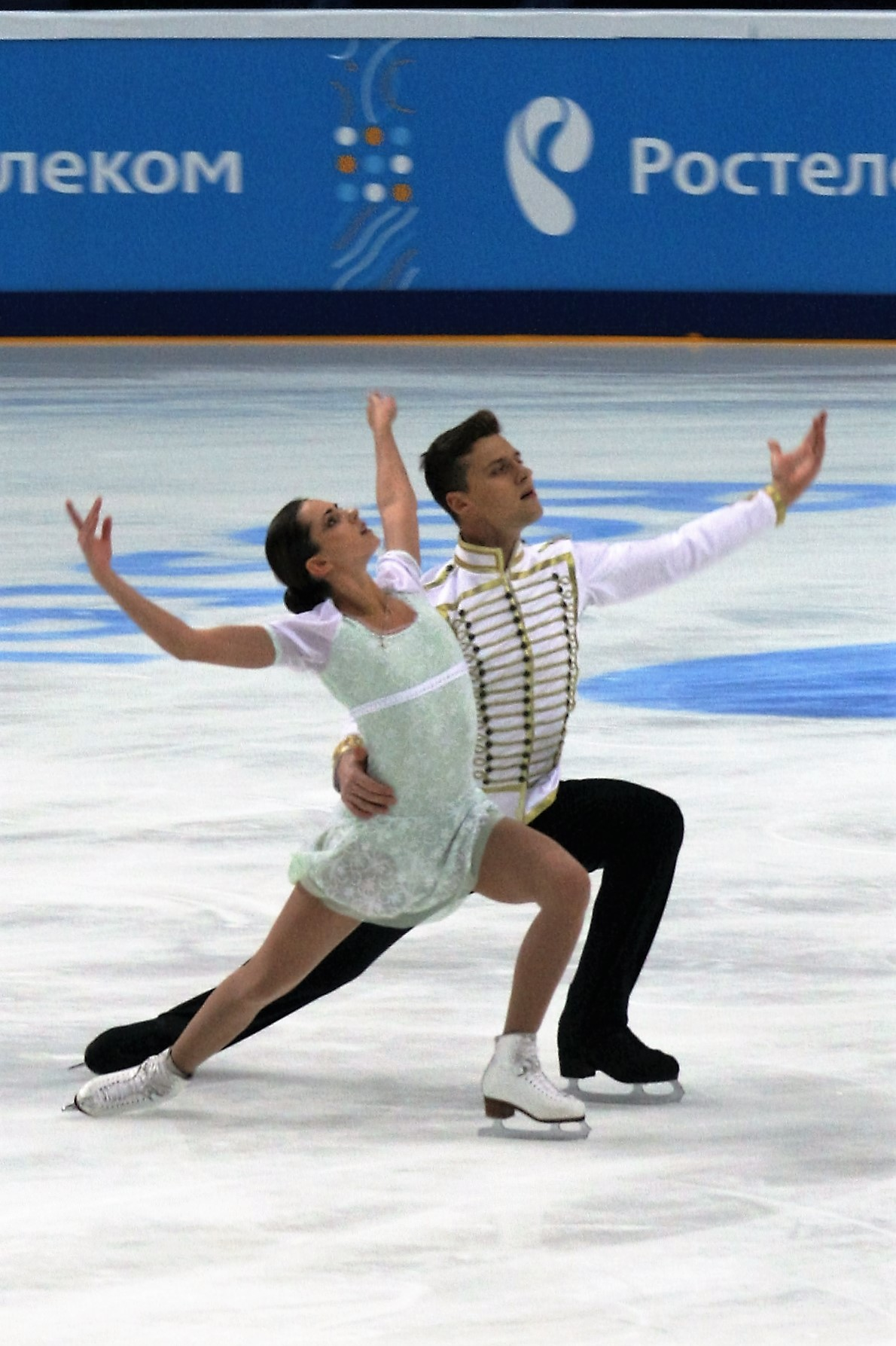
Zabiyako and Enbert at the 2016 Rostelecom Cup

With Zabiyako

2018–19 season
Date	Event	SP	FS	Total
11–14 April 2019	2019 World Team Trophy	1; 75.80	2; 141.32	3T/2P; 217.12
18–24 March 2019	2019 World Championships	4; 73.96	4; 144.02	3; 217.98
19–23 December 2018	2019 Russian Championships	2; 78.53	2; 151.96	2; 230.49
6–9 December 2018	2018–19 Grand Prix Final	2; 75.18	4; 125.89	4; 201.07
9–11 November 2018	2018 NHK Trophy	1; 73.48	1; 140.66	1; 214.14
2–4 November 2018	2018 Grand Prix of Helsinki	2; 67.59	1; 130.92	1; 198.51
12–16 September 2018	2018 CS Lombardia Trophy	1; 72.50	2; 123.65	1; 196.15
2017–18 season
Date	Event	SP	FS	Total
19–25 March 2018	2018 World Championships	4; 74.38	6; 133.50	4; 207.88
14–25 February 2018	2018 Winter Olympics	8; 74.35	7; 138.53	7; 212.88
9–12 February 2018	2018 Winter Olympics (Team event)		3; 133.28	2
15–21 January 2018	2018 European Championships	2; 72.95	3; 137.23	3; 210.18
21–24 December 2017	2018 Russian Championships	3; 75.00	3; 132.51	3; 207.51
6–9 December 2017	2017 CS Golden Spin of Zagreb	1; 68.76	1; 134.20	1; 202.96
24–26 November 2017	2017 Skate America	4; 70.15	5; 127.74	4; 197.89
27–29 October 2017	2017 Skate Canada	4; 69.00	4; 123.70	4; 192.70
21–23 September 2017	2017 CS Ondrej Nepela Trophy	2; 64.52	1; 128.06	1; 192.58
14–17 September 2017	2017 CS Lombardia Trophy	1; 69.22	1; 126.84	1; 196.06
2016–17 season
Date	Event	SP	FS	Total
29 March – 2 April 2017	2017 World Championships	5; 74.26	13; 118.28	12; 192.54
25–29 January 2017	2017 European Championships	5; 72.38	5; 128.37	5; 200.75
20–26 December 2016	2017 Russian Championships	3; 72.85	3; 129.06	3; 201.91
8–11 December 2016	2016–17 Grand Prix Final	5; 65.79	5; 122.53	4; 188.32
11–13 November 2016	2016 Trophée de France	3; 71.36	4; 121.20	4; 192.56
4–6 November 2016	2016 Rostelecom Cup	1; 69.76	2; 128.01	2; 197.77
30 September – 2 October 2016	2016 CS Ondrej Nepela Memorial	3; 67.04	3; 114.34	3; 181.38
2015–16 season
Date	Event	SP	FS	Total
23–27 December 2015	2016 Russian Championships	5; 70.60	5; 134.43	5; 205.03
2–5 December 2015	2015 CS Golden Spin of Zagreb	4; 60.96	4; 112.66	4; 173.62
20–22 November 2015	2015 Rostelecom Cup	5; 60.77	5; 119.79	5; 180.56
15–18 October 2015	2015 CS Mordovian Ornament	2; 67.64	2; 128.58	2; 196.22
