= Sofia Biryukova =

Russian figure skater

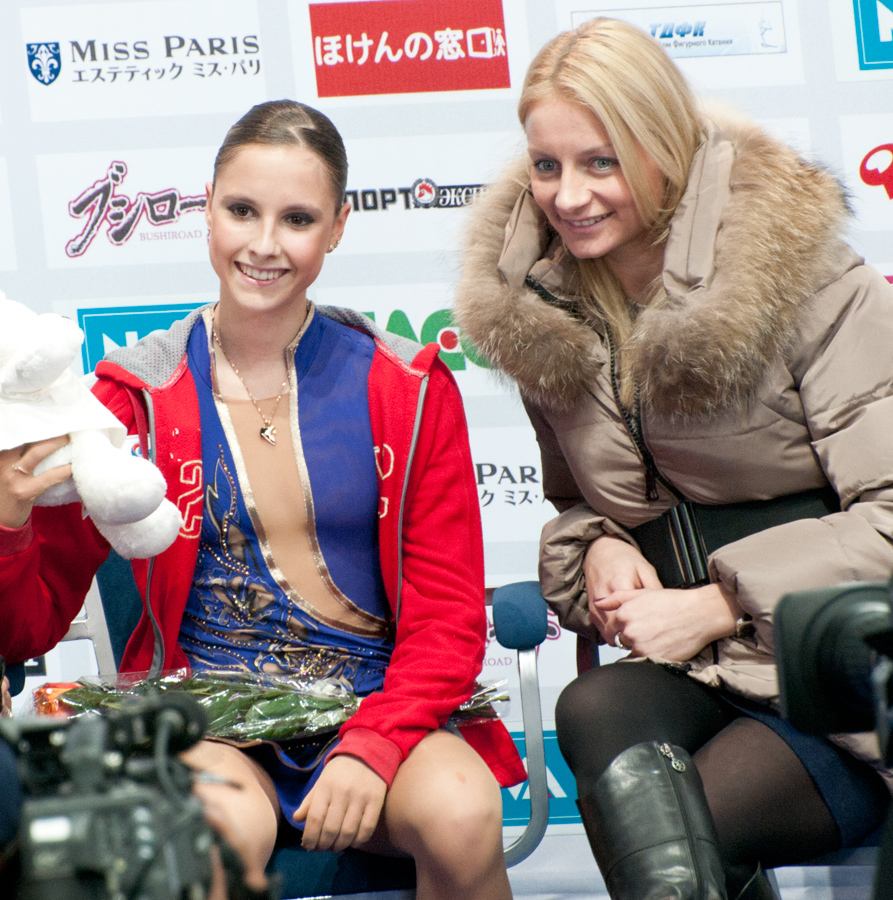
- Biryukova with her former coach, Viktoria Volchkova, at the 2011 Cup of Russia

Personal information
- Full name: Sofia Sergeyevna Biryukova
- Born: 19 July 1994 (age 32) Moscow, Russia
- Height: 1.60 m (5 ft 3 in)

Figure skating career
- Country: Russia
- Partner: Andrei Filonov
- Coach: Dmitri Savin
- Skating club: Vorobyovy Gory
- Began skating: 2001
Medal record
Representing Russia
Ladies Figure skating
Winter Universiade
Gold medal – first place	2013 Trentino	Ladies' singles

Sofia Sergeyevna Biryukova (Russian: Софья Серге́евна Бирюкова; born 19 July 1994) is a Russian figure skater. She is the 2013 Winter Universiade champion and 2011 Finlandia Trophy champion.

== Career ==
Biryukova competed in the 2009–10 ISU Junior Grand Prix series, winning a silver medal in Turkey. The following season, she began competing on the senior level internationally. She appeared at her first senior Grand Prix event, the 2010 Cup of Russia.

Biryukova began the 2011–12 season by winning gold at the 2011 Finlandia Trophy. She placed 4th at the 2011 Cup of Russia, setting personal bests in both programs. Toward the end of the season, she sustained four fractures.

In the 2012–2013 season, Biryukova was assigned to two ISU Grand Prix events, the 2012 Cup of China and 2012 NHK Trophy, and finished 9th at both.

Biryukova won the gold medal at the 2013 Winter Universiade. Since Butsaeva was unable to attend, Svetlana Sokolovskaya stepped in to work with her at the event.

=== Pair Skating career ===
In spring 2014, Biryukova decided to try pair skating. After telling her coach, Butsaeva, Butsaeva contacted pairs coach, Nina Mozer, and Mozer invited Biryukova to watch the pair skating at the Vorobyovy Gory where she coaches. After deciding she wanted to switch to pair skating, Mozer agreed to let her train at the rink and paired her up with Aleksandr Stepanov in the fall of 2014, who was also a singles skater that wanted to switch to pair skating. Pavel Alexandrovich Kitashev became the pair team's coach. On January 13, 2015, however, Biryukova stated she was unsure if she would continue pair skating or start coaching, feeling as though she hadn't made a lot of progress as a pair skater.

Deciding to end her pair skating career, Biryukova ended her partnership with Stepanov. Four months later, however, Biryukova was contacted by Nina Mozer, who convinced her to tryout with pair skater Andrei Filonov, who was looking for a partner. After a successful tryout, the pair decided to skate together and are coached by Dmitri Savin.

The pair made their skating debut at the 2016 Russian Figure Skating Championships, where they placed 7th.

== Programs ==
=== With Filonov ===
Season	Short program	Free skating
2015–2016	Mozart, l'opéra rock by Dove Attia	Lacrimosa by Wolfgang Amadeus Mozart; Adagio for Strings by Samuel Barber; O Verona (from Romeo + Juliet) by Craig Armstrong

=== Singles Skating ===
Season	Short program	Free skating	Exhibition
2012–2013	The Mask of Zorro by James Horner	Turandot by Giacomo Puccini	
2011–2012	Seven Years in Tibet by John Williams	Turandot by Giacomo Puccini	You Haven't Seen the Last of Me by Cher
2010–2011	Tosca by Giacomo Puccini	Danse macabre, Op. 40 by Camille Saint-Saëns	
2009–2010	Libertango by Astor Piazzolla	Danse macabre, Op. 40 by Camille Saint-Saëns	

== Competition highlights ==
=== With Filonov ===
National
Event	2015–16
Russian Champ.	7th

=== Singles Skating ===
International
Event	2009–10	2010–11	2011–12	2012–13	2013–14
GP Cup of China				9th	
GP NHK Trophy				9th	
GP Rostelecom		6th	4th		
Winter Universiade					1st
Finlandia		7th	1st		
Cup of Nice		6th			
International: Junior
JGP Turkey	2nd				
National
Russian Champ.	6th	6th	9th	17th	12th
Russian Junior	7th	6th			
