= Georgia Glastris =

American-born figure skater (born 1992)

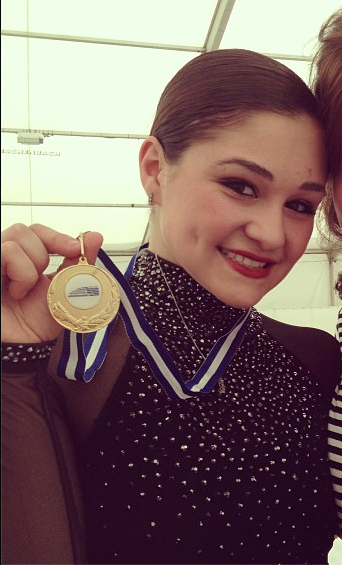
- Glastris in 2011

Personal information
- Born: August 1, 1992 (age 33) Chicago, Illinois
- Home town: Winnetka, Illinois
- Height: 5 ft 0 in (1.52 m)

Figure skating career
- Country: Greece
- Coach: Julie Berlin; Jodie Tasich
- Skating club: DuPage FSC

Georgia Glastris (born August 1, 1992, in Chicago, Illinois, United States) is an American-born figure skater who competes for Greece. As of July 2014, she has won the Greek national championship three times, placed second three times, and competed in the 2010, 2011, and 2012 World Figure Skating Championships, and the 2011 and 2012 European Figure Skating Championships.
