= 2010 Cup of Russia =

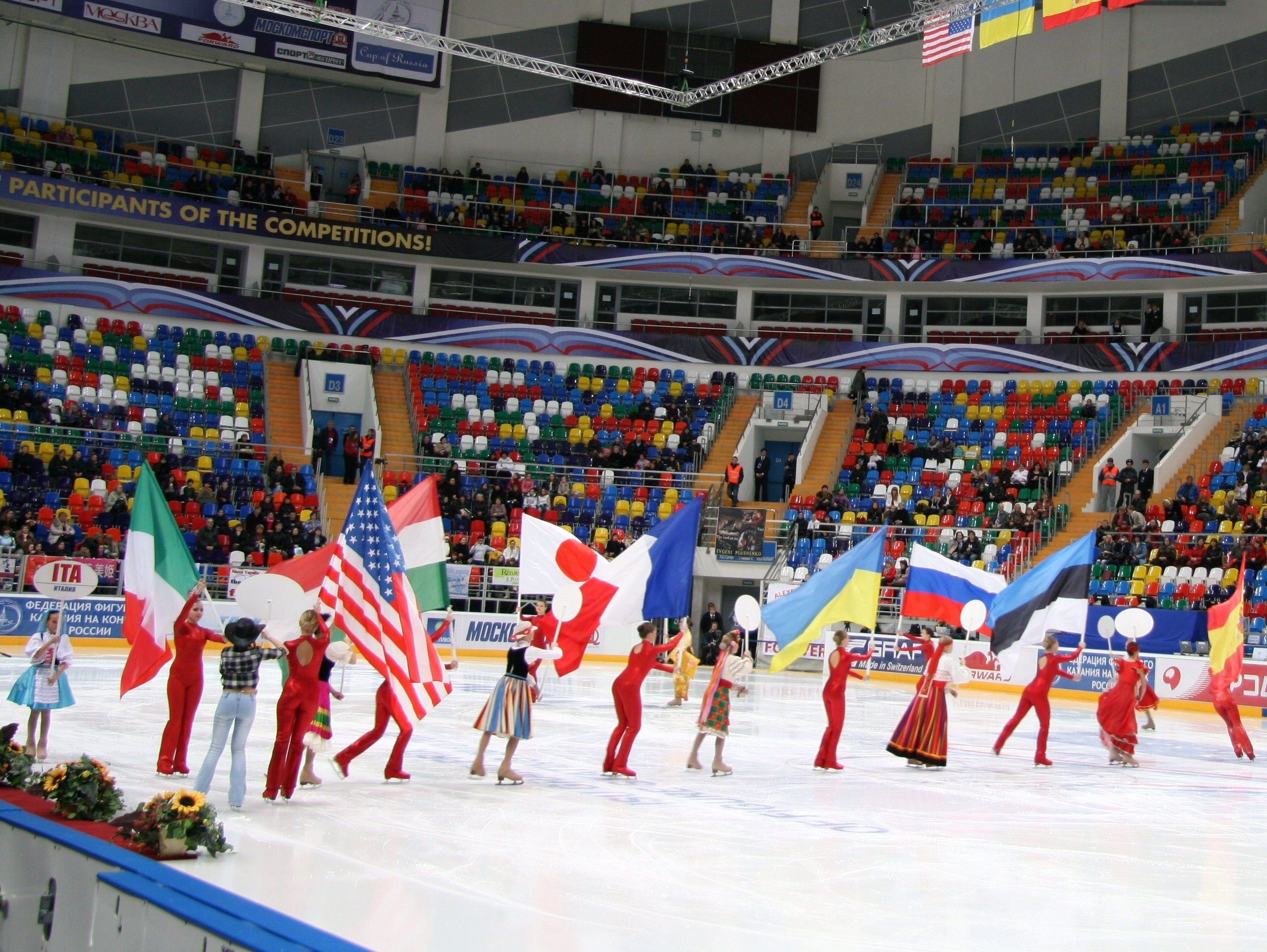
- Opening ceremony
- Type: Grand Prix
- Date: November 18 – 21
- Season: 2010–11
- Location: Moscow
- Host: Figure Skating Federation of Russia
- Venue: Megasport Arena

Champions
- Men's singles: (Czech Republic) Tomáš Verner
- Ladies' singles: (Japan) Miki Ando
- Pairs: (Russia) Yuko Kavaguti / Alexander Smirnov
- Ice dance: (Russia) Ekaterina Bobrova / Dmitri Soloviev
- Previous: 2009 Rostelecom Cup
- Next: 2011 Rostelecom Cup
- Previous GP: 2010 Skate America
- Next GP: 2010 Trophée Éric Bompard

The 2010 Cup of Russia was the fifth event of six in the 2010–11 ISU Grand Prix of Figure Skating, a senior-level international invitational competition series. It was held at the Megasport Arena in Moscow on November 18–21. Medals were awarded in the disciplines of men's singles, ladies' singles, pair skating, and ice dancing. Skaters earned points toward qualifying for the 2010–11 Grand Prix Final.

== Results ==
=== Men ===
Rank	Name	Nation	Total points	SP		FS	
1	Tomáš Verner	Czech Republic	230.31	3	74.10	1	156.21
2	Patrick Chan	Canada	227.21	1	81.96	2	145.25
3	Jeremy Abbott	United States	217.21	2	77.61	4	139.60
4	Samuel Contesti	Italy	207.30	9	65.69	3	141.61
5	Alban Préaubert	France	204.68	5	70.50	5	134.18
6	Artur Gachinski	Russia	202.94	4	72.41	7	130.53
7	Yuzuru Hanyu	Japan	202.66	6	70.24	6	132.42
8	Ivan Tretiakov	Russia	189.85	10	65.61	8	124.24
9	Javier Fernández	Spain	184.06	8	66.46	10	117.60
10	Konstantin Menshov	Russia	181.15	7	67.34	12	113.81
11	Tatsuki Machida	Japan	177.01	12	56.37	9	120.64
12	Anton Kovalevski	Ukraine	175.54	11	60.05	11	115.49

=== Ladies ===
Rank	Name	Nation	Total points	SP		FS	
1	Miki Ando	Japan	174.47	5	54.00	1	120.47
2	Akiko Suzuki	Japan	172.74	1	57.43	2	115.31
3	Ashley Wagner	United States	167.02	3	56.17	3	110.85
4	Agnes Zawadzki	United States	153.78	2	56.84	8	96.94
5	Valentina Marchei	Italy	153.71	6	53.61	4	100.10
6	Sofia Biryukova	Russia	153.05	4	54.99	5	98.06
7	Ksenia Makarova	Russia	150.45	8	52.93	6	97.52
8	Myriane Samson	Canada	144.32	7	53.26	9	91.06
9	Alena Leonova	Russia	144.06	9	46.61	7	97.45
10	Jelena Glebova	Estonia	131.20	10	45.78	10	85.42

=== Pairs ===
Rank	Name	Nation	Total points	SP		FS	
1	Yuko Kavaguti / Alexander Smirnov	Russia	182.70	1	61.91	1	120.79
2	Narumi Takahashi / Mervin Tran	Japan	165.47	2	55.90	3	109.57
3	Amanda Evora / Mark Ladwig	United States	162.85	4	52.58	2	110.27
4	Katarina Gerboldt / Alexander Enbert	Russia	160.42	3	53.62	4	106.80
5	Paige Lawrence / Rudi Swiegers	Canada	154.67	5	51.67	5	103.00
6	Stefania Berton / Ondřej Hotárek	Italy	150.85	7	49.78	6	101.07
7	Britney Simpson / Nathan Miller	United States	145.78	6	50.28	7	95.50
8	Tatiana Novik / Mikhail Kuznetsov	Russia	136.85	8	45.48	8	91.37

=== Ice dancing ===
Rank	Name	Nation	Total points	SD		FD	
1	Ekaterina Bobrova / Dmitri Soloviev	Russia	154.33	1	60.80	1	93.53
2	Nóra Hoffmann / Maxim Zavozin	Hungary	142.09	3	57.24	3	84.85
3	Elena Ilinykh / Nikita Katsalapov	Russia	134.79	6	49.14	2	85.65
4	Kristina Gorshkova / Vitali Butikov	Russia	127.47	4	51.97	4	75.50
5	Lucie Myslivečková / Matěj Novák	Czech Republic	123.70	7	48.45	5	75.25
WD	Federica Faiella / Massimo Scali	Italy		2	57.65		
WD	Madison Hubbell / Keiffer Hubbell	United States		5	50.59		
WD	Alexandra Paul / Mitchell Islam	Canada		8	45.75		
