= Anton Kovalevski =

Ukrainian figure skater

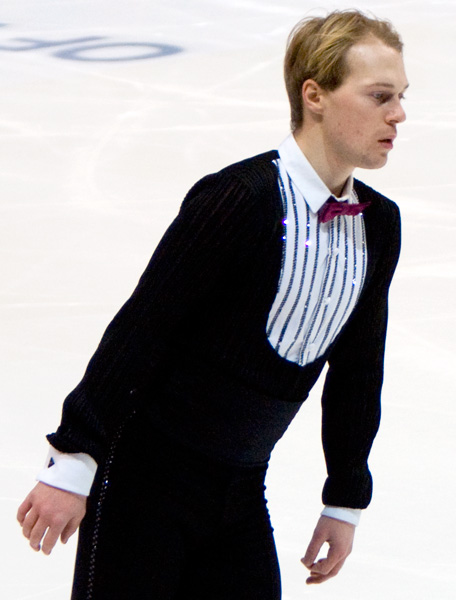
- Anton Kovalevski at the 2010 Cup of Russia

Personal information
- Native name: Антон Володимирович Ковалевський
- Full name: Anton Volodymyrovych Kovalevski
- Born: 9 March 1985 (age 41) Kiev, Ukrainian SSR, Soviet Union
- Home town: Oberstdorf, Germany
- Height: 1.71 m (5 ft 7 1/2 in)

Figure skating career
- Country: Ukraine
- Discipline: Men's singles
- Began skating: 1989

Medal record
Ukrainian Championships
Gold medal – first place	2006 Kyiv	Singles
Gold medal – first place	2007 Kyiv	Singles
Gold medal – first place	2009 Kyiv	Singles
Gold medal – first place	2010 Dnipropetrovsk	Singles
Gold medal – first place	2011 Kyiv	Singles
Silver medal – second place	2003 Kyiv	Singles
Silver medal – second place	2004 Kyiv	Singles
Bronze medal – third place	2002 Kyiv	Singles
Bronze medal – third place	2005 Kyiv	Singles

Anton Volodymyrovych Kovalevski (Ukrainian: Антон Володимирович Ковалевський; born 9 March 1985) is a Ukrainian former competitive figure skater. He won medals at the Crystal Skate of Romania, Golden Spin of Zagreb, Ice Challenge, and Ondrej Nepela Memorial, and is a four-time (2006–07, 2009–10) Ukrainian national champion. He decided to take a break from competitive skating after the 2010-11 season.

== Programs ==
Season	Short program	Free skating
2010–2011	Stop Time Rag	Stazione di Palermo by Salvatore Vali
2009–2010	Flamenco by Didulya	Stazione di Palermo by Salvatore Vali
2008–2009	Flamenco by Didulya	Armenian Dance; Bolero for Violin and Orchestra by Walter Taieb, Vanessa-Mae
2007–2008	Flamenco	Beethoven's Last Night by Trans-Siberian Orchestra
2006–2007	Tango by Astor Piazzolla	Beethoven's Last Night by Trans-Siberian Orchestra
2005–2006	Tango by Astor Piazzolla	Spartacus by Aram Khachaturian
2004–2005	Gopak by Stenli	Spartacus by Aram Khachaturian
2003–2004	Ave Maria by Franz Schubert	Un Homme Et Une Femme by Francis Lai; The Matrix Reloaded by Don Davis
2002–2003	Ave Maria by Franz Schubert	The Mexican by Alan Silvestri
2000–2002	The Magnificent Seven by Elmer Bernstein	Oliver (musical)

== Competitive highlights ==
GP: Grand Prix; JGP: Junior Grand Prix

International
Event	98–99	99–00	00–01	01–02	02–03	03–04	04–05	05–06	06–07	07–08	08–09	09–10	10–11
Olympics								20th				24th	
Worlds								16th	24th	20th	22nd	16th	16th
Europeans								16th	13th		19th	13th	15th
GP Bompard								10th					8th
GP Cup of Russia							9th		9th				12th
GP NHK Trophy											11th		
GP Skate Canada											9th		
Nebelhorn Trophy											5th	12th	
Crystal Skate						1st	2nd	6th					
Finlandia Trophy										WD			
Golden Spin							3rd					8th	3rd
Ice Challenge												2nd	
Merano Cup												4th	
Nepela Memorial													3rd
Skate Israel						5th		4th					
Universiade					5th	14th							
International: Junior
Junior Worlds			21st	13th	7th	18th							
JGP Bulgaria						7th							
JGP Czech Rep.				7th		9th							
JGP France					4th								
JGP Germany					4th								
JGP Poland				5th									
National
Ukrainian	4th J	6th	1st J.	3rd	2nd	2nd	3rd	1st	1st		1st	1st	1st
