= Pernelle Carron =

French ice dancer

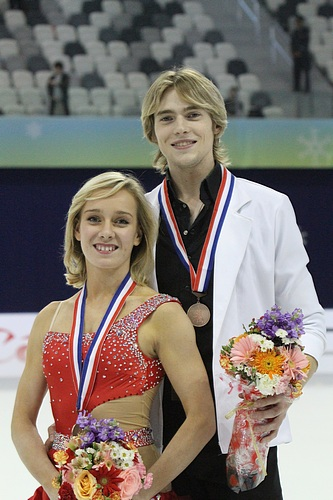
- Carron and Jones in 2011

Personal information
- Born: 20 August 1986 (age 40) Gleizé, France
- Height: 1.60 m (5 ft 3 in)

Figure skating career
- Country: France
- Partner: Lloyd Jones
- Skating club: Club de Courchevel; CSGL Lyon, ALPAD
- Began skating: 1992
- Retired: September 5, 2014
Medal record
Representing France
Figure skating: Ice dancing
Winter Universiade
Gold medal – first place	2013 Trentino	Ice dancing
Bronze medal – third place	2007 Turin	Ice dancing

Pernelle Carron (born 20 August 1986) is a French former competitive ice dancer. With partner Lloyd Jones, she is the 2013 Winter Universiade champion, 2010 Cup of Nice champion, three-time NRW Trophy champion, and 2010 French national champion. She won bronze at two Grand Prix events, 2011 Cup of China and 2007 Skate Canada International, and competed at the 2014 Winter Olympics in Sochi.

== Personal life ==
Carron was born on 20 August 1986 in Gleize, France. She studied interior architecture and design at CREAD School in Lyon.

== Career ==
=== Early partnerships ===
Pernelle Carron started skating at age six. She started skating because her aunt has Down Syndrome and all the family was going skating with her. Her aunt, Clothilde Fedry, participated several times at the Special Olympics and won the bronze medal as a solo figure skater.

Carron skated with Edouard Dezutter for twelve years and finished 13th at the 2005 World Junior Championships.

In the summer of 2005, Carron teamed up with Mathieu Jost. Together, they were the 2006 and 2007 French national bronze medalists and the 2008 and 2009 French national silver medalists. Carron and Jost also won a bronze medal at the 2007 Skate Canada International, finished 6th at the 2009 European Championships, and were ninth in their only appearance at the World Championships. Carron ended her partnership with Jost in April 2009.

=== Partnership with Lloyd Jones ===
Carron teamed up with Lloyd Jones in April 2009. They were coached by Muriel Boucher-Zazoui and Romain Haguenauer in Lyon, France, at the start of their partnership.

In their first season together, Carron and Jones won the NRW Trophy and became the French national champions. Carron and Jones were 12th at the European Championships and at that season's World Championships.

In the 2010–2011 season, they again won the 2010 NRW Trophy, as well as the 2010 Coupe de Nice, and finished 5th and 4th in two Grand Prix assignments, 2011 Skate Canada and the 2010 Trophee Eric Bompard, respectively. At the French Championships, they finished second to Nathalie Pechalat / Fabian Bourzat. They moved up to 9th at the European Championships and again finished 12th at Worlds. After the season ended, they moved to the United States to be coached by Natalia Linichuk.

In 2011–12, Carron and Jones began their season by taking silver at the 2011 Cup of Nice. They then won their first Grand Prix medal together, bronze, at the 2011 Cup of China. At the end of the season, they moved to the United Kingdom to be coached by Marika Humphreys.

After retiring from competition the two skated in ice shows. They appeared as the principal couple for Holiday on Ice's Passion Tour. Carron has also worked as an ice skating coach and choreographer.

== Programs ==
=== With Jones ===
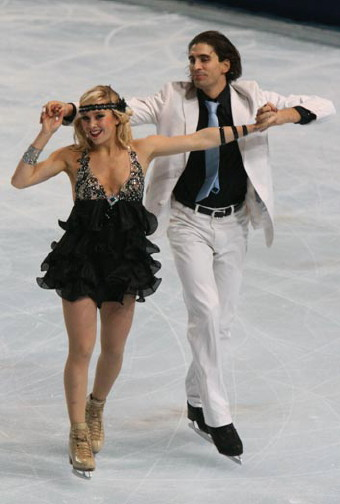
Carron with previous partner Matthieu Jost

Season	Short dance	Free dance	Exhibition
2013–2014	Foxtrot: De-Lovely; Quickstep: Anything Goes by Cole Porter	Swan Lake by Pyotr Tchaikovsky	
2012–2013	Polka: Cotton Eyed Joe; Waltz: Tennessee Waltz; Polka: Cotton Eyed Joe	La Chanson des Vieux Amants by Jacques Brel	
2011–2012	Mambo; Historia de un amor by Perez Prado; Mambo No. 8	Jazz Night	Buona Sera Signorina by Louis Prima
2010–2011	La Valse A Mille Temps by Jacques Brel	George Gershwin medley; Paint It Black; Angie by The Rolling Stones	Seaside Rendez Vous by Queen
	Original dance		
2009–2010	Lord of the Dance by Ronan Hardiman	Adagio by Il Divo	Lord of the Dance by Ronan Hardiman

=== With Jost ===
Season	Original dance	Free dance	Exhibition
2008–2009	Basin Street Blues by Louis Armstrong	Venez Milord; La Foule; Venez Milord by Édith Piaf; Butterflies and Hurricanes by Muse	
2007–2008	Degeneration performed by Mes Aïeux	Nocturne by Frédéric Chopin	Massive Attack
2006–2007	Maria de Buenos Aires by Astor Piazzolla: Yo Soy Maria; Aria de los Analista; Milonga de la Anuciacion	Venez Milord; La Foule; Venez Milord by Édith Piaf	

=== With Dezutter ===
Season	Original dance	Free dance
2004–2005	Charleston; Slow foxtrot; Charleston	Adagio Remix
2003–2004	Swing: In the Mood by Glenn Miller; Blues: Petite Fleur by Sydney Bechet; Swing: In the Mood by Glenn Miller	Moulin Rouge!: Sparkling Diamonds by Jim Broadbent; Come What May; Pitch – Spectacular Spectacular by Jim Broadbent

== Competitive highlights ==
GP: Grand Prix; JGP: Junior Grand Prix

=== With Jones ===
International
Event	09–10	10–11	11–12	12–13	13–14
Winter Olympics					15th
World Champ.	12th	12th	21st	12th	
European Champ.	12th	9th	7th	10th	13th
GP Bompard	9th	4th		8th	
GP Cup of China			3rd		4th
GP Rostelecom			6th		
GP Skate America					6th
GP Skate Canada		5th		7th	
Cup of Nice		1st	2nd		
Golden Spin					2nd
Ice Challenge	6th				
NRW Trophy	1st	1st		1st	
Winter Universiade					1st
National
French Champ.	1st	2nd	2nd	2nd	
Masters	3rd	2nd			
Team events
World Team Trophy				6th T 5th P	
T = Team result; P = Personal result; Medals awarded for team result only.

=== With Jost ===
International
Event	2005–06	2006–07	2007–08	2008–09
World Champ.				9th
European Champ.		9th	9th	6th
GP Bompard	11th	8th	5th	5th
GP Cup of China		5th		
GP Skate America				5th
GP Skate Canada			3rd	
Schäfer Memorial	7th			1st
Universiade		3rd		
National
French Champ.	3rd	3rd	2nd	2nd

=== With Dezutter ===
International
Event	99–00	00–01	01–02	02–03	03–04	04–05
Junior Worlds					15th	13th
JGP China				6th		
JGP Croatia					6th	
JGP Czech Rep.					5th	
JGP France						3rd
JGP Italy				8th		
JGP Poland			9th			
JGP Romania						6th
JGP Sweden			9th			
National
French Champ.	1st N	1st N	4th J	3rd J		
Levels: N = Novice; J = Junior
