= Lloyd Jones (figure skater) =

Welsh-French ice dancer

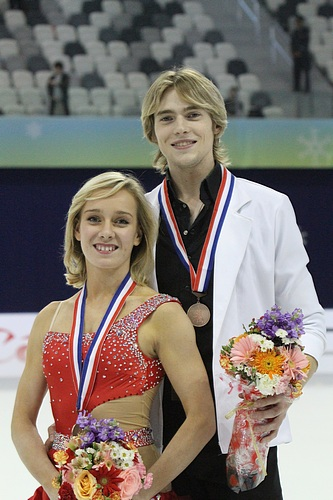
- Jones with Carron in 2011

Personal information
- Born: 1 August 1988 (age 38) Cardiff, Wales
- Height: 1.86 m (6 ft 1 in)

Figure skating career
- Country: France
- Partner: Pernelle Carron
- Began skating: 1994
- Retired: 5 September 2014
Medal record
Representing France
Figure skating: Ice dancing
Winter Universiade
Gold medal – first place	2013 Trentino	Ice dancing

Lloyd Jones (born 1 August 1988) is a Welsh-French former competitive ice dancer. He represented France from 2009 to 2014. With Pernelle Carron, he is the 2011 Cup of China bronze medalist, 2013 Winter Universiade champion, 2010 Cup of Nice champion, three-time NRW Trophy champion, and 2010 French national champion. The two competed at the 2014 Winter Olympics in Sochi. Earlier in his career, Jones competed for Great Britain.

== Personal life ==
Jones was born on 1 August 1988 in Cardiff, Wales. He became a French citizen in October 2013.

== Career ==
=== Early partnerships ===
Early in his career, Jones competed for Great Britain. Following a partnership with Lucy Strange, he teamed up with Leigh Rogers. They won two British national junior titles and competed twice at the World Junior Championships. His next partner was Danielle Bennett, with whom he won silver on the junior level at the 2009 British Championships.

=== Partnership with Pernelle Carron ===
In April 2009, Jones teamed up with Pernelle Carron to compete for France. They were coached by Muriel Boucher-Zazoui and Romain Haguenauer in Lyon, France, at the start of their partnership.

In their first season together, Carron and Jones won the NRW Trophy and became the French national champions, a title they won in the absence of the higher ranked Isabelle Delobel / Olivier Schoenfelder and Nathalie Pechalat / Fabian Bourzat. Carron and Jones were 12th at the European Championships and at that season's World Championships.

In the 2010–2011 season, they again won the 2010 NRW Trophy, as well as the 2010 Coupe de Nice, and finished 5th and 4th in two Grand Prix assignments, 2011 Skate Canada and the 2010 Trophee Eric Bompard, respectively. They were unable to defend their national title, finishing with a silver medal behind Pechalat and Bourzat. They moved up to 9th at the European Championships and again finished 12th at Worlds. After the season ended, they moved to the United States to be coached by Natalia Linichuk.

In 2011–12, Carron and Jones began their season by taking silver at the 2011 Cup of Nice. They then won their first Grand Prix medal together, bronze, at the 2011 Cup of China. At the end of the season, they moved to the UK to be coached by Marika Humphreys.

== Programs ==
=== With Carron ===
Season	Short dance	Free dance	Exhibition
2013–2014	Foxtrot: De-Lovely; Quickstep: Anything Goes by Cole Porter	Swan Lake by Pyotr Tchaikovsky	
2012–2013	Polka: Cotton Eyed Joe; Waltz: Tennessee Waltz; Polka: Cotton Eyed Joe	La Chanson des Vieux Amants by Jacques Brel	
2011–2012	Mambo; Historia de un amor by Perez Prado; Mambo No. 8	Jazz Night	Buona Sera Signorina by Louis Prima
2010–2011	La Valse A Mille Temps by Jacques Brel	George Gershwin medley; Paint It Black; Angie by The Rolling Stones	Seaside Rendez Vous by Queen
	Original dance		
2009–2010	Lord of the Dance by Ronan Hardiman	Adagio by Il Divo	Lord of the Dance by Ronan Hardiman

=== With Rogers ===
Season	Original dance	Free dance
2006–2007	La cumparsita; Libertango by Astor Piazzolla	The Nightmare Before Christmas; Corpse Bride by Danny Elfman
2005–2006	Samba: Loona Viva El Amor by Dj Sammy; Rhumba: Con Los Anos Que Me Queden by Gloria Estefan, Emilio Estefan Jr.; Samba: Laundry Service by Shakira, Gloria Estefan	Hi De Ho by various artists; Gee Baby Aint I Good to You by D. Redman and A Razel; Hey Pachuco by E. Nichols

== Competitive highlights ==
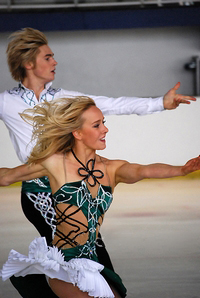
2009 Master's de Patinage, Pernelle Carron / Lloyd Jones

GP: Grand Prix; JGP: Junior Grand Prix

=== With Carron for France ===
International
Event	09–10	10–11	11–12	12–13	13–14
Winter Olympics					15th
World Champ.	12th	12th	21st	12th	
European Champ.	12th	9th	7th	10th	13th
GP Bompard	9th	4th		8th	
GP Cup of China			3rd		4th
GP Rostelecom			6th		
GP Skate America					6th
GP Skate Canada		5th		7th	
Cup of Nice		1st	2nd		
Golden Spin					2nd
Ice Challenge	6th				
NRW Trophy	1st	1st		1st	
Winter Universiade					1st
National
French Champ.	1st	2nd	2nd	2nd	
Masters	3rd	2nd			
Team events
World Team Trophy				6th T 5th P	
T = Team result; P = Personal result; Medals awarded for team result only.

=== With Bennett for Great Britain ===
National
Event	2008–2009
British Championships	2nd J
J = Junior level

=== With Rogers for Great Britain ===
International
Event	2005–06	2006–07	2007–08
World Junior Championships	20th	17th	
JGP Bulgaria			12th
JGP Czech Republic		9th	
JGP Netherlands		12th	
JGP Romania	14th		
JGP United Kingdom			11th
Grand Prize SNP	4th		
National
British Championships	1st J	1st J	
J = Junior level
