= Lesia Valadzenkava =

Belarusian ice dancer

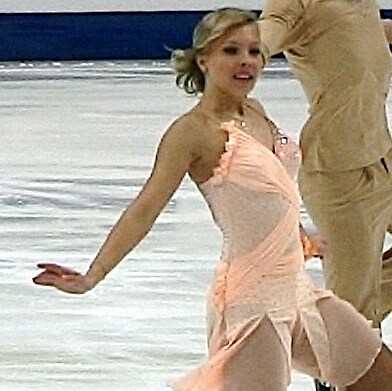
- Valadzenkava and Vakunov in 2011

Personal information
- Other names: Belarusian: Lesia Valadzenkava; Russian: Lesia Volodenkova
- Born: 1 May 1991 (age 35) Minsk, Belarus
- Height: 1.64 m (5 ft 4 1/2 in)

Figure skating career
- Country: Belarus
- Partner: Vitali Vakunov
- Coach: Tatiana Bieliaeva
- Skating club: RCOP Raybichi
- Began skating: 1996

Lesia Valadzenkava or Volodenkova (born 1 May 1991) is a Belarusian ice dancer. With partner Vitali Vakunov, she is a two-time Belarusian national champion.

== Programs ==
(with Vakunov)

Season	Short dance	Free dance
2012–2013	Waltz; Polka by Johann Strauss	Corpse Bride
2011–2012	Rhumba; Samba	Linkin Park
2010–2011	Waltz; Slow Fox	Per Te by Josh Groban
	Original dance	
2009–2010	Belarus folk: Old Oslo	Lacrymosa by Evanescence
2008–2009	Blues	Carmen

== Competitive highlights ==
(with Vakunov)

Results
International
Event	2006–07	2007–08	2008–09	2009–10	2010–11	2011–12	2012–13
Worlds					17th PR	38th	
Europeans				26th	13th PR	16th PR	
Coupe de Nice						12th	
Ice Star							3rd
Pavel Roman		13th J.			5th		
Universiade					10th		
International: Junior
Junior Worlds			26th	29th			
JGP Belarus			10th				
JGP Croatia				16th			
JGP Estonia		13th					
JGP Italy			13th				
JGP Norway	14th						
JGP Poland				11th			
NRW Trophy			6th J.				
National
Belarusian	3rd	4th		1st	1st		
J. = Junior level; JGP = Junior Grand Prix; PR = Preliminary round
