= 2010–11 figure skating season =

2010–2011 figure skating season
- Date: July 1, 2010 – June 30, 2011
- Previous: 2009–10
- Next: 2011–12

The 2010–11 figure skating season began on July 1, 2010, and ended on June 30, 2011. During this season, elite skaters competed on the ISU Championship level at the 2011 European, Four Continents, World Junior, and World Championships. They also competed in elite competitions such as the Grand Prix series and Junior Grand Prix series, culminating in the Grand Prix Final.

== Season notes ==
This was the first season in which the short dance was contested in ice dance, having replaced the compulsory dance and original dance. The season's required pattern dance was the Golden Waltz (senior) or Viennese Waltz (junior), and the other portion of the dance could be a waltz, foxtrot, quickstep, or tango.

Beginning in the 2010–11 season, a rule change allowed men to do two quads in the short program, if they were different jumps. In October 2010, Kevin Reynolds became the first skater to land two quads in a short program. He landed a quad salchow-triple toe loop combo and later a solo quadruple toe-loop at the 2010 Skate Canada International.

In December 2010, there was a tie for a medal at the Junior Grand Prix Final. In the ladies' event, China's Li Zijun and Japan's Risa Shoji were tied for third with an identical total score of 149.82. Li was awarded the medal on the tiebreaker.

The season also saw the coldest temperatures in many years at a major event. In January 2011 at the European Championships, temperatures at the Swiss venue dipped to as low as minus-3 Celsius, resulting in complaints and a promise for more vigilance in the future.

During the 2010–2011 season, controversy over age falsification reached the sport of figure skating, after previously being discussed in gymnastics and other sports. On February 14, 2011, questions emerged surrounding nine Chinese skaters. The Associated Press found that birthdates listed on the Chinese skating association's website suggested five female skaters, Sui Wenjing, Zhang Dan, Yu Xiaoyu, Geng Bingwa, and Xu Binshu, were younger than their stated ages, and four male skaters, Han Cong, Zhang Hao, Jin Yang, and Gao Yu, were older. The dates disappeared from the website by February 15. On February 17, the ISU said there were no discrepancies for Zhang Dan, Zhang Hao, and Xu Binshu between the birthdates listed on their passports, ISU registration forms and the Chinese Olympic Committee's website.

On March 14, 2011, the 2011 World Championships, scheduled to begin on March 21, were postponed due to the 2011 Tōhoku earthquake and tsunami and its aftermath, and later reassigned to Moscow, Russia. It was the first disaster affecting the World Championships in 50 years. In 1961, the entire United States team was killed in a plane crash, resulting in its cancellation. The last time a World Championships was moved was in 2000, due to an alleged broadcasting dispute, and the new host, France, had seven months to prepare, with the event held in the traditional month of March. However, the 2011 event had to be pushed back to April 24 – May 1, with only a month to prepare.

There were several slashing accidents. In September 2010, Evan Bates suffered a complete laceration of his Achilles tendon after Emily Samuelson hit him with her skate blade as she came down from a lift. In February 2011, Caydee Denney accidentally sliced Jeremy Barrett's right calf while practicing side-by-side jumps, requiring 42 stitches. In April 2011, Brian Joubert sliced his own hand while competing at the World Championships. There were two collisions during practice at international events. Canadian Patrick Chan and American Adam Rippon collided at 2010 Skate Canada International, while Japanese skaters Takahiko Kozuka and Daisuke Takahashi collided at the Grand Prix Final. Canadian pair skater Meagan Duhamel collided with her partner Eric Radford during competition at the World Championships, breaking his nose with her elbow. No skaters withdrew as a result of the accidents.

One skater was arrested – In May 2011, Israeli pair skater Evgeni Krasnapolski was charged with alleged desertion from the army. The Israeli skating federation stated, "We've asked for clarifications [about his service], and if we would have gotten them immediately Evgeni would have returned. The decision to let him stay abroad for training was a professional call made by the federation. The soldier got the (right) impression that we are handling the matter with the IDF and that he could trust the federation". In June 2011, U.S. Figure Skating reprimanded and fined Rachael Flatt, who competed at the World Championships with an undisclosed stress fracture but could have been replaced by an alternate, for not informing them of her injury.

In April 2011, the International Olympic Committee officially confirmed the introduction of a figure skating team event at the 2014 Winter Olympics. Each team will be composed of a men's and ladies single skater, a pair, and an ice dance team; ten teams may compete, with five eliminated after the short program. On June 12, 2011, it was announced that the ISU had reinstated Evgeni Plushenko by a unanimous vote.

=== Age eligibility ===
Skaters competing on the junior level were required to be at least 13 but not 19 – or 21 for male pair skaters and ice dancers – before July 1, 2010. Those who had turned 14 were eligible for the senior Grand Prix series and senior B internationals. Those who turned 15 before July 1, 2010 were also eligible for the senior World, European, and Four Continents Championships.

Date of birth	Eligibility
Born before July 1, 1997	Eligible for Junior Grand Prix
Born before July 1, 1996	Eligible for senior Grand Prix series, senior B internationals
Born before July 1, 1995	Eligible for senior Worlds, Europeans, Four Continents
Born before July 1, 1991	Not eligible for junior events (except male pair skaters and ice dancers)
Born before July 1, 1989	Male pair skaters and ice dancers not eligible for junior events
Rules may not apply to non-ISU events such as national championships

=== Minimum scores ===
It was the first season in which skaters were required to have achieved minimum technical elements scores (TES) prior to competing at the European, Four Continents, or World Championships. The minimum TES for each discipline and segment were:

Discipline	Short program/dance	Free skating/dance
Men	20	35
Ladies	15	25
Pairs	17	30
Ice dance	17	28

=== Partnership changes ===
A number of skaters announced the end of their partnership or the formation of a new one. Listed are changes involving a partnership with at least one partner who competed at the Worlds, Europeans, Four Continents, Junior Worlds or the senior Grand Prix, or who medaled on the Junior Grand Prix circuit.

Discipline	Announced	Type	Skaters	Other notes
Pairs	October 8, 2010	New team	Mary Beth Marley / Rockne Brubaker
Pairs	January 6, 2011	Split	Nicole Della Monica / Yannick Kocon
Pairs	February 2011	New team	Britney Simpson / Matthew Blackmer
Pairs	February 24, 2011	Split	Caydee Denney / Jeremy Barrett
Pairs	March 4, 2011	Split	Maria Mukhortova / Jérôme Blanchard
Pairs	March 10, 2011	Split	Felicia Zhang / Taylor Toth	Zhang with Nathan Bartholomay
Pairs	March 10, 2011	Split	Jessica Dubé / Bryce Davison
Pairs	April 17, 2011	New team	Jessica Dubé / Sébastien Wolfe
Pairs	May 4, 2011	Split	Caitlin Yankowskas / John Coughlin
Ice dance	May 12, 2011	Split	Madison Hubbell / Keiffer Hubbell
Ice dance	May 12, 2011	New team	Madison Hubbell / Zachary Donohue
Pairs	May 17, 2011	New team	Caydee Denney / John Coughlin
Ice dance	June 2, 2011	Split	Vanessa Crone / Paul Poirier
Ice dance	June 7, 2011	Split	Madison Chock / Greg Zuerlein	Zuerlein retired.
Ice dance	June 22, 2011	Split	Emily Samuelson / Evan Bates
Ice dance	July 1, 2011	New team	Madison Chock / Evan Bates
Ice dance	July 2011	Split	Lucie Myslivečková / Matěj Novák	Novák retired.
Ice dance	July 2011	Split	Allison Reed / Otar Japaridze
Ice dance	July 2011	Split	Stefanie Frohberg / Tim Giesen	Both retired.
Ice dance		Split	Zoe Blanc / Pierre-Loup Bouquet	Blanc retired.
Pairs		Split	Adeline Canac / Yannick Bonheur
Pairs		Split	Tatiana Novik / Mikhail Kuznetsov	Novik with Andrei Novoselov; Kuznetsov with Anna Silaeva
Ice dance		Split	Federica Testa / Christopher Mior	Mior with Federica Bernardi; Testa with Lukáš Csölley
Ice dance		Split	Brooke Frieling / Lionel Rumi
Ice dance		Split	Siobhan Heekin-Canedy / Alexander Shakalov
Ice dance		New team	Siobhan Heekin-Canedy / Dmitri Dun

=== Coaching changes ===
Discipline	Announced	Skater(s)	From	To
Ladies	September 7, 2010	Mao Asada	Hiroshi Nagakubo	Nobuo Sato
Ladies	January 2011	Ksenia Makarova	Viktor Petrenko, Galina Zmievskaya	Evgeni Rukavitsin
Ice dance	Mid-season	Cathy Reed / Chris Reed	Nikolai Morozov	Galit Chait
Ladies	March 30, 2011	Alexe Gilles	Tom Zakrajsek	Yuka Sato, Jason Dungjen
Men	April 1, 2011	Adam Rippon	Brian Orser	Ghislain Briand, transitional
Ice dance	April 30, 2011	Nathalie Péchalat / Fabian Bourzat	Alexander Zhulin, Oleg Volkov	Pasquale Camerlengo, Anjelika Krylova
Ice dance	May 17, 2011	Elena Ilinykh / Nikita Katsalapov	Alexander Zhulin, Oleg Volkov	Nikolai Morozov
Ladies	June 3, 2011	Agnes Zawadzki	Tom Zakrajsek	David Santee, Christy Krall
Ladies	June 14, 2011	Ashley Wagner	Priscilla Hill	John Nicks
Men	June 14, 2011	Javier Fernández	Nikolai Morozov	TBD, temp. Brian Orser
Men	June 15, 2011	Adam Rippon	Ghislain Briand	Jason Dungjen
Ice dance	Spring 2011	Pernelle Carron / Lloyd Jones	Muriel Boucher-Zazoui, Romain Haguenauer	Natalia Linichuk

=== Retirements ===
A number of elite skaters announced their retirement from competition.

Discipline	Announced	Skater(s)
Ladies	February 4, 2011	Sarah Meier
Pairs	March 25, 2011	Mylène Brodeur / John Mattatall
Men	April 1, 2011	Shawn Sawyer
Ice dance	April 6, 2011	Sinead Kerr / John Kerr
Men	May 10, 2011	Ryan Bradley
Men	May 31, 2011	Joey Russell
Men		Kristoffer Berntsson

== Competitions ==
Key

ISU Championships	Grand Prix	Other international	Nationals	Other domestic

Date	Event	Type	Level	Disc.	Location	
2010
August 4–8	Southern Skate International	Other inter.	Sen.–Nov.	M/L	Dunedin, New Zealand	
August 25–28	JGP Courchevel	Grand Prix	Junior	M/L/D	Courchevel, France	Details
August 27–29	Asian Trophy	Other inter.	Sen.–Nov.	M/L	Bangkok, Thailand	Details
September 8–12	JGP Brasov Cup	Grand Prix	Junior	M/L/D	Braşov, Romania	Details
September 15–19	JGP Cup of Austria	Grand Prix	Junior	All	Graz, Austria	Details
September 22–26	JGP SBC Cup	Grand Prix	Junior	M/L/D	Karuizawa, Japan	Details
September 23–26	Nebelhorn Trophy	Other int.	Senior	All	Oberstdorf, Germany	Details
Sept. 29 – Oct. 3	JGP John Curry Memorial	Grand Prix	Junior	All	Sheffield, England	Details
Sept. 30 – Oct. 2	Master's de Patinage	Other dom.	Sen.–Jun.	All	Orléans, France	Details
Sept. 30 – Oct. 2	Ondrej Nepela Memorial	Other int.	Senior	M/L/D	Bratislava, Slovakia	Details
October 2	Japan Open	Other int.	Senior	M/L	Saitama, Japan	Details
October 3–8	New Zealand Championships	Nats.	Sen.–Nov.	All	Dunedin, New Zealand	Details
October 4–5	South African Championships	Nats.	Sen.–Nov.	M/L	Cape Town, South Africa	Details
October 6–10	JGP Blauen Schwerter	Grand Prix	Junior	All	Dresden, Germany	Details
October 8–10	Finlandia Trophy	Other int.	Senior	M/L/D	Vantaa, Finlandia	Details
October 13–17	JGP Czech Skate	Grand Prix	Junior	All	Ostrava, Czech Republic	Details
October 13–17	Coupe de Nice	Other int.	Sen.–Jun.	All	Nice, France	Details
October 19–24	Tirnavia Ice Cup	Other int.	Jun.–PJ	M/L/D	Trnava, Slovakia	Details
October 22–24	NHK Trophy	Grand Prix	Senior	All	Nagoya, Japan	Details
October 29–31	Skate Canada	Grand Prix	Senior	All	Kingston, Ontario	Details
November 5–7	Cup of China	Grand Prix	Senior	All	Beijing, China	Details
November 5–7	NRW Trophy	Other int.	Sen.–Nov.	D	Dortmund, Germany	Details
November 5–7	Skate Celje	Other int.	Jun.–PN.	M/L	Celje, Slovenia	Details
November 9–14	Ice Challenge	Other int.	Sen.–Nov.	All	Graz, Austria	Details
November 11–14	Skate America	Grand Prix	Senior	All	Portland, Oregon	Details
November 18–21	Crystal Skate of Romania	Other int.	Senior	M/L	Braşov, Romania	
November 18–21	Romanian Championships	Nats.	Senior	M/L	Braşov, Romania	
November 18–21	Warsaw Cup	Other int.	Sen.–Nov.	M/L/P	Warsaw, Poland	Details
November 19–20	Belgian Championships	Nats.	Sen.–Nov.	All	Hasselt, Belgium	Details
November 19–21	Pavel Roman Memorial	Other int.	Sen.–Nov.	D	Olomouc, Czech Republic	Details
November 19–21	Merano Cup	Other int.	Sen.–Jun.	M/L	Merano, Italy	
November 19–21	International Trophy of Lyon	Other int.	Sen.–Nov.	D	Lyon, France	Details
November 19–21	Cup of Russia	Grand Prix	Senior	All	Moscow, Russia	Details
November 21–27	British Championships	Nats.	Sen.–Nov.	All	Sheffield, U.K.	Details
November 23–27	Istanbul Cup	Other int.	Sen.–Nov.	M/L/D	Istanbul, Turkey	
Nov. 25 – Dec. 3	Australian Championships	Nats.	Sen.–Nov.	All	Melbourne, Australia	Details
November 26–28	Trophee Eric Bompard	Grand Prix	Senior	All	Paris, France	Details
December 1–5	Santa Claus Cup	Other int.	Jun.–PN	M/L/D	Budapest, Hungary	Details
December 2–5	Danish Championships	Nats.	Sen.–Nov.	M/L/D	Aarhus, Denmark	Details
December 2–5	NRW Trophy	Other int.	Sen.–Nov.	M/L/P	Dortmund, Germany	Details
December 9–10	Swiss Championships	Nats.	Senior	All	Zug, Switzerland	Details
December 9–11	Golden Spin of Zagreb	Other int.	Senior	All	Zagreb, Croatia	Details
December 9–12	Grand Prix Final	Grand Prix	Sen.–Jun.	All	Beijing, China	Details
December 11–12	Latvian Championships	Nats.	Sen.–Nov.	M/L	Riga, Latvia	Details
December 16–18	Three Nationals Championships (Czech, Slovak, Polish)	Nats.	Sen.–Nov.	All	Žilina, Slovakia	Details
December 16–19	Italian Championships	Nats.	Sen.–Jun.	All	Milan, Italy	Details
December 16–19	Swedish Championships	Nats.	Sen.–Jun.	M/L/P	Malmö, Sweden	Details
December 17–19	Austrian Championships	Nats.	Sen.–Jun.	All	St. Pölten, Austria	Details 1, 2
December 17–19	Dutch Championships	Nats.	Sen.–Jun.	M/L/P	Groningen, Netherlands	Details
December 17–19	Estonian Championships	Nats.	Senior	M/L/D	Narva, Estonia	Details 1 2
December 17–19	Finnish Championships	Nats.	Sen.–Jun.	M/L/D	Turku, Finland	Details
December 17–19	French Championships	Nats.	Senior	All	Tours, France	Details
December 17–19	Spanish Championships	Nats.	Sen.–Nov.	M/L/D	Barcelona, Spain	Details
December 21–23	Ukrainian Championships	Nats.	Senior	All	Kyiv, Ukraine	Details
December 23–24	Chinese Championships	Nats.	Senior	All	Qiqihar, China	
December 24–27	Japan Championships	Nats.	Senior	All	Nagano, Japan	Details
December 26–29	Russian Championships	Nats.	Senior	All	Saransk, Russia	Details
2011
January 6–8	Mentor Nestle Nesquik Cup	Other int.	Sen.–Nov.	M/L/P	Toruń, Poland	Details
January 7–8	German Championships	Nats.	Senior	All	Oberstdorf, Germany	Details
January 8–9	Hungarian Championships	Nats.	Sen.–Nov.	All	Budapest, Hungary	Details
January 14–15	Skate Helena	Other int.	Jun.–Nov.	M/L	Belgrade, Serbia	Details
January 14–16	Norwegian Championships	Nats.	Sen.–Nov.	M/L	Hamar, Norway	Details
January 14–16	South Korean Championships	Nats.	Sen.–Nov.	M/L	Seoul, South Korea	Details
January 17–23	Canadian Championships	Nats.	Sen.–Nov.	All	Victoria, British Columbia	Details
January 22–30	U.S. Championships	Nats.	Sen.–Nov.	All	Greensboro, North Carolina	Details
January 24–30	European Championships	ISU Champ.	Senior	All	Bern, Switzerland	Details
February 1–5	Winter Universiade	Other int.	Senior	All	Erzurum, Turkey	Details
February 2–4	Russian Junior Championships	Nats.	Junior	All	Kazan, Russia	Details
February 3–5	Asian Winter Games	Other int.	Senior		Astana, Kazakhstan	
February 4–7	Dragon Trophy/Tivoli Cup	Other int.	Jun.–Nov.	M/L	Ljubljana, Slovenia	Details
February 9–13	Bavarian Open	Other int.	Sen.–Nov.	All	Oberstdorf, Germany	Details
February 10–13	Nordic Championships	Other int.	Sen.–Nov.	M/L	Rødovre, Denmark	Details
February 12–19	European Youth Olympic Festival	Other int.	Junior	M/L	Liberec, Czech Republic	Details
February 15–20	Four Continents Championships	ISU Champ.	Senior	All	Taipei, Taiwan	Details
February 15–20	Mont Blanc Trophy	Other int.	Sen.–Jun.	All	Courmayeur, Italy	Details
Feb. 28 – Mar. 6	World Junior Championships	ISU Champ.	Junior	All	Gangneung, South Korea	Details
Mar. 31 – Apr. 3	Gardena Spring Trophy	Other int.	Sen.–Nov.	M/L	Sëlva, Italy	Details
April 1–3	French Junior Championships	Nats.	Jun.–Nov.	M/L/P	Cergy	Details
April 4–10	Triglav Trophy	Other int.	Sen.–Nov.	M/L	Jesenice, Slovenia	Details
Apr. 24 – May 1	World Championships	ISU Champ.	Senior	All	Moscow, Russia	Details
Apr. 28 – May 1	Rooster Cup	Other int.	Novice	M/L	Courbevoie, France	Details
Type: ISU Champ. = ISU Championships; Other int. = International events except ISU Championships and Grand Prix; Nats. = National championships; Other nat. = Other national events Levels: Sen. = Senior; Jun. = Junior; Nov. = Novice; PN. = Pre-novice; Disciplines: M = Men's singles; L = Ladies' singles; P = Pair skating; D = Ice dance; All = All four disciplines

== International medalists ==
=== Men ===
Championships
Competition	Gold	Silver	Bronze	Reports
Europeans	(France) Florent Amodio	(France) Brian Joubert	(Czech Republic) Tomáš Verner	Details
Four Continents	(Japan) Daisuke Takahashi	(Japan) Yuzuru Hanyu	(United States) Jeremy Abbott	Details
Junior Worlds	(Canada) Andrei Rogozine	(Japan) Keiji Tanaka	(Sweden) Alexander Majorov	Details
Worlds	(Canada) Patrick Chan	(Japan) Takahiko Kozuka	(Russia) Artur Gachinski	Details
Grand Prix
Competition	Gold	Silver	Bronze	Reports
NHK Trophy	(Japan) Daisuke Takahashi	(United States) Jeremy Abbott	(France) Florent Amodio	Details
Skate Canada	(Canada) Patrick Chan	(Japan) Nobunari Oda	(United States) Adam Rippon	Details
Cup of China	(Japan) Takahiko Kozuka	(United States) Brandon Mroz	(Czech Republic) Tomáš Verner	Details
Skate America	(Japan) Daisuke Takahashi	(Japan) Nobunari Oda	(United States) Armin Mahbanoozadeh	Details
Rostelecom Cup	(Czech Republic) Tomáš Verner	(Canada) Patrick Chan	(United States) Jeremy Abbott	Details
Trophée Bompard	(Japan) Takahiko Kozuka	(France) Florent Amodio	(United States) Brandon Mroz	Details
Grand Prix Final	(Canada) Patrick Chan	(Japan) Nobunari Oda	(Japan) Takahiko Kozuka	Details

=== Ladies ===
Championships
Competition	Gold	Silver	Bronze	Reports
Europeans	(Switzerland) Sarah Meier	(Italy) Carolina Kostner	(Finland) Kiira Korpi	Details
Four Continents	(Japan) Miki Ando	(Japan) Mao Asada	(United States) Mirai Nagasu	Details
Junior Worlds	(Russia) Adelina Sotnikova	(Russia) Elizaveta Tuktamysheva	(United States) Agnes Zawadzki	Details
Worlds	(Japan) Miki Ando	(South Korea) Kim Yuna	(Italy) Carolina Kostner	Details
Grand Prix
Competition	Gold	Silver	Bronze	Reports
NHK Trophy	(Italy) Carolina Kostner	(United States) Rachael Flatt	(Japan) Kanako Murakami	Details
Skate Canada	(United States) Alissa Czisny	(Russia) Ksenia Makarova	(Canada) Amélie Lacoste	Details
Cup of China	(Japan) Miki Ando	(Japan) Akiko Suzuki	(Russia) Alena Leonova	Details
Skate America	(Japan) Kanako Murakami	(United States) Rachael Flatt	(Italy) Carolina Kostner	Details
Rostelecom Cup	(Japan) Miki Ando	(Japan) Akiko Suzuki	(United States) Ashley Wagner	Details
Trophée Bompard	(Finland) Kiira Korpi	(United States) Mirai Nagasu	(United States) Alissa Czisny	Details
Grand Prix Final	(United States) Alissa Czisny	(Italy) Carolina Kostner	(Japan) Kanako Murakami	Details

=== Pairs ===
Championships
Competition	Gold	Silver	Bronze	Reports
Europeans	(Germany) Aliona Savchenko / Robin Szolkowy	(Russia) Yuko Kavaguti / Alexander Smirnov	(Russia) Vera Bazarova / Yuri Larionov	Details
Four Continents	(China) Pang Qing / Tong Jian	(Canada) Meagan Duhamel / Eric Radford	(Canada) Paige Lawrence / Rudi Swiegers	Details
Junior Worlds	(China) Sui Wenjing / Han Cong	(Russia) Ksenia Stolbova / Fedor Klimov	(Japan) Narumi Takahashi / Mervin Tran	Details
Worlds	(Germany) Aliona Savchenko / Robin Szolkowy	(Russia) Tatiana Volosozhar / Maxim Trankov	(China) Pang Qing / Tong Jian	Details
Grand Prix
Competition	Gold	Silver	Bronze	Reports
NHK Trophy	(China) Pang Qing / Tong Jian	(Russia) Vera Bazarova / Yuri Larionov	(Japan) Narumi Takahashi / Mervin Tran	Details
Skate Canada	(Russia) Lubov Iliushechkina / Nodari Maisuradze	(Canada) Kirsten Moore-Towers / Dylan Moscovitch	(Canada) Paige Lawrence / Rudi Swiegers	Details
Cup of China	(China) Pang Qing / Tong Jian	(China) Sui Wenjing / Han Cong	(United States) Caitlin Yankowskas / John Coughlin	Details
Skate America	(Germany) Aliona Savchenko / Robin Szolkowy	(Canada) Kirsten Moore-Towers / Dylan Moscovitch	(China) Sui Wenjing / Han Cong	Details
Rostelecom Cup	(Russia) Yuko Kavaguti / Alexander Smirnov	(Japan) Narumi Takahashi / Mervin Tran	(United States) Amanda Evora / Mark Ladwig	Details
Trophée Bompard	(Germany) Aliona Savchenko / Robin Szolkowy	(Russia) Vera Bazarova / Yuri Larionov	(Germany) Maylin Hausch / Daniel Wende	Details
Grand Prix Final	(Germany) Aliona Savchenko / Robin Szolkowy	(China) Pang Qing / Tong Jian	(China) Sui Wenjing / Han Cong	Details

=== Ice dance ===
Championships
Competition	Gold	Silver	Bronze	Reports
Europeans	(France) Nathalie Péchalat / Fabian Bourzat	(Russia) Ekaterina Bobrova / Dmitri Soloviev	(United Kingdom) Sinead Kerr / John Kerr	Details
Four Continents	(United States) Meryl Davis / Charlie White	(United States) Maia Shibutani / Alex Shibutani	(Canada) Vanessa Crone / Paul Poirier	Details
Junior Worlds	(Russia) Ksenia Monko / Kirill Khaliavin	(Russia) Ekaterina Pushkash / Jonathan Guerreiro	(United States) Charlotte Lichtman / Dean Copely	Details
Worlds	(United States) Meryl Davis / Charlie White	(Canada) Tessa Virtue / Scott Moir	(United States) Maia Shibutani / Alex Shibutani	Details
Grand Prix
Competition	Gold	Silver	Bronze	Reports
NHK Trophy	(United States) Meryl Davis / Charlie White	(Canada) Kaitlyn Weaver / Andrew Poje	(United States) Maia Shibutani / Alex Shibutani	Details
Skate Canada	(Canada) Vanessa Crone / Paul Poirier	(United Kingdom) Sinead Kerr / John Kerr	(United States) Madison Chock / Greg Zuerlein	Details
Cup of China	(France) Nathalie Péchalat / Fabian Bourzat	(Russia) Ekaterina Bobrova / Dmitri Soloviev	(Italy) Federica Faiella / Massimo Scali	Details
Skate America	(United States) Meryl Davis / Charlie White	(Canada) Vanessa Crone / Paul Poirier	(United States) Maia Shibutani / Alex Shibutani	Details
Rostelecom Cup	(Russia) Ekaterina Bobrova / Dmitri Soloviev	(Hungary) Nóra Hoffmann / Maxim Zavozin	(Russia) Elena Ilinykh / Nikita Katsalapov	Details
Trophée Bompard	(France) Nathalie Péchalat / Fabian Bourzat	(Russia) Vera Bazarova / Yuri Larionov	(United States) Madison Chock / Greg Zuerlein	Details
Grand Prix Final	(United States) Meryl Davis / Charlie White	(France) Nathalie Péchalat / Fabian Bourzat	(Canada) Vanessa Crone / Paul Poirier	Details

== Season's best scores ==
Top scores attained in international competitions as of April 30, 2011 (World Championships)

=== Men ===
Men's season's best scores.

Rank	Name	Country	Points	Event
1	Patrick Chan	Canada	280.98	2011 World Championships
2	Takahiko Kozuka	Japan	258.41	2011 World Championships
3	Daisuke Takahashi	Japan	244.00	2011 Four Continents Championships
4	Nobunari Oda	Japan	242.81	2010–2011 Grand Prix Final
5	Artur Gachinski	Russia	241.86	2011 World Championships
6	Michal Březina	Czech Republic	233.61	2011 World Championships
7	Adam Rippon	United States	233.04	2010 Skate Canada International
8	Tomáš Verner	Czech Republic	230.31	2010 Cup of Russia
9	Florent Amodio	France	229.68	2011 World Championships
10	Yuzuru Hanyu	Japan	228.01	2011 Four Continents Championships

=== Ladies ===
Ladies' season's best scores.

Rank	Name	Country	Points	Event
1	Miki Ando	Japan	201.34	2011 Four Continents Championships
2	Mao Asada	Japan	196.30	2011 Four Continents Championships
3	Kim Yuna	Republic of Korea	194.50	2011 World Championships
4	Mirai Nagasu	United States	189.46	2011 Four Continents Championships
5	Carolina Kostner	Italy	184.68	2011 World Championships
6	Alena Leonova	Russia	183.92	2011 World Championships
7	Alissa Czisny	United States	182.25	2011 World Championships
8	Rachael Flatt	United States	180.31	2011 Four Continents Championships
9	Adelina Sotnikova	Russia	178.97	2010 JGP Cup of Austria
10	Kanako Murakami	Japan	178.59	2010–2011 Grand Prix Final

=== Pairs ===
Pairs season's best scores.

Rank	Name	Country	Points	Event
1	Aliona Savchenko / Robin Szolkowy	Germany	217.85	2011 World Championships
2	Tatiana Volosozhar / Maxim Trankov	Russia	210.73	2011 World Championships
3	Qing Pang / Jian Tong	People's Republic of China	204.12	2011 World Championships
4	Yuko Kavaguti / Alexander Smirnov	Russia	203.61	2011 European Championships
5	Vera Bazarova / Yuri Larionov	Russia	188.24	2011 European Championships
6	Meagan Duhamel / Eric Radford	Canada	181.79	2011 Four Continents Championships
7	Wenjing Sui / Cong Han	People's Republic of China	179.04	2010–2011 Grand Prix Final
8	Lubov Iliushechkina / Nodari Maisuradze	Russia	177.44	2010–2011 Grand Prix Final
9	Caitlin Yankowskas / John Coughlin	United States	175.94	2011 World Championships
10	Kirsten Moore-Towers / Dylan Moscovitch	Canada	175.48	2010 Skate America

=== Ice dance ===
Ice dance season's best scores.

Rank	Name	Country	Points	Event
1	Meryl Davis / Charlie White	United States	185.27	2011 World Championships
2	Tessa Virtue / Scott Moir	Canada	181.79	2011 World Championships
3	Nathalie Péchalat / Fabian Bourzat	France	167.40	2011 European Championships
4	Maia Shibutani / Alex Shibutani	United States	163.79	2011 World Championships
5	Ekaterina Bobrova / Dmitri Soloviev	Russia	161.14	2011 European Championships
6	Kaitlyn Weaver / Andrew Poje	Canada	160.32	2011 World Championships
7	Sinead Kerr / John Kerr	United Kingdom	157.49	2011 European Championships
8	Ksenia Monko / Kirill Khaliavin	Russia	155.04	2010 JGP J. Curry Memorial
9	Elena Ilinykh / Nikita Katsalapov	Russia	154.50	2011 World Championships
10	Vanessa Crone / Paul Poirier	Canada	154.42	2010 Skate Canada International

== Standings and ranking ==
=== Season-end standings (top 30) ===
==== Men's singles ====
As of May 2011

Rank	Nation	Skater						
Rank	Nation	Skater	1	JPN	Daisuke Takahashi			
2	CAN	Patrick Chan	1	JPN	Daisuke Takahashi			
2	CAN	Patrick Chan	1	JPN	Daisuke Takahashi	3	JPN	Nobunari Oda
2	CAN	Patrick Chan	4	USA	Evan Lysacek	3	JPN	Nobunari Oda
5	CZE	Tomas Verner	4	USA	Evan Lysacek	3	JPN	Nobunari Oda
5	CZE	Tomas Verner	4	USA	Evan Lysacek	6	CZE	Michal Brezina
5	CZE	Tomas Verner	7	JPN	Takahiko Kozuka	6	CZE	Michal Brezina
8	USA	Jeremy Abbott	7	JPN	Takahiko Kozuka	6	CZE	Michal Brezina
8	USA	Jeremy Abbott	7	JPN	Takahiko Kozuka	9	ITA	Samuel Contesti
8	USA	Jeremy Abbott	10	RUS	Artur Gachinski	9	ITA	Samuel Contesti

==== Ladies' singles ====
As of May 2011

Rank	Nation	Skater						
Rank	Nation	Skater	1	ITA	Carolina Kostner			
2	KOR	Yuna Kim	1	ITA	Carolina Kostner			
2	KOR	Yuna Kim	1	ITA	Carolina Kostner	3	JPN	Miki Ando
2	KOR	Yuna Kim	4	JPN	Akiko Suzuki	3	JPN	Miki Ando
5	RUS	Alena Leonova	4	JPN	Akiko Suzuki	3	JPN	Miki Ando
5	RUS	Alena Leonova	4	JPN	Akiko Suzuki	6	FIN	Kiira Korpi
5	RUS	Alena Leonova	7	JPN	Mao Asada	6	FIN	Kiira Korpi
8	USA	Alissa Czisny	7	JPN	Mao Asada	6	FIN	Kiira Korpi
8	USA	Alissa Czisny	7	JPN	Mao Asada	9	CAN	Joannie Rochette
8	USA	Alissa Czisny	10	FIN	Laura Lepistö	9	CAN	Joannie Rochette

==== Pairs ====
As of May 2011

Rank	Nation	Skater						
Rank	Nation	Skater	1	GER	Aliona Savchenko / Robin Szolkowy			
2	CHN	Qing Pang / Jian Tong	1	GER	Aliona Savchenko / Robin Szolkowy			
2	CHN	Qing Pang / Jian Tong	1	GER	Aliona Savchenko / Robin Szolkowy	3	RUS	Yuko Kavaguti / Alexander Smirnov
2	CHN	Qing Pang / Jian Tong	4	CHN	Dan Zhang / Hao Zhang	3	RUS	Yuko Kavaguti / Alexander Smirnov
5	RUS	Vera Bazarova / Yuri Larionov	4	CHN	Dan Zhang / Hao Zhang	3	RUS	Yuko Kavaguti / Alexander Smirnov
5	RUS	Vera Bazarova / Yuri Larionov	4	CHN	Dan Zhang / Hao Zhang	6	CHN	Wenjing Sui / Cong Han
5	RUS	Vera Bazarova / Yuri Larionov	7	USA	Caitlin Yankowskas / John Coughlin	6	CHN	Wenjing Sui / Cong Han
8	CAN	Jessica Dube / Bryce Davison	7	USA	Caitlin Yankowskas / John Coughlin	6	CHN	Wenjing Sui / Cong Han
8	CAN	Jessica Dube / Bryce Davison	7	USA	Caitlin Yankowskas / John Coughlin	9	JPN	Narumi Takahashi / Mervin Tran
8	CAN	Jessica Dube / Bryce Davison	10	GER	Maylin Hausch / Daniel Wende	9	JPN	Narumi Takahashi / Mervin Tran

==== Ice dance ====
As of May 2011

Rank	Nation	Skater						
Rank	Nation	Skater	1	USA	Meryl Davis / Charlie White			
2	FRA	Nathalie Péchalat / Fabian Bourzat	1	USA	Meryl Davis / Charlie White			
2	FRA	Nathalie Péchalat / Fabian Bourzat	1	USA	Meryl Davis / Charlie White	3	GBR	Sinead Kerr / John Kerr
2	FRA	Nathalie Péchalat / Fabian Bourzat	4	CAN	Tessa Virtue / Scott Moir	3	GBR	Sinead Kerr / John Kerr
5	CAN	Vanessa Crone / Paul Poirier	4	CAN	Tessa Virtue / Scott Moir	3	GBR	Sinead Kerr / John Kerr
5	CAN	Vanessa Crone / Paul Poirier	4	CAN	Tessa Virtue / Scott Moir	6	CAN	Kaitlyn Weaver / Andrew Poje
5	CAN	Vanessa Crone / Paul Poirier	6	RUS	Ekaterina Bobrova / Dmitri Soloviev	6	CAN	Kaitlyn Weaver / Andrew Poje
8	ITA	Anna Cappellini / Luca Lanotte	6	RUS	Ekaterina Bobrova / Dmitri Soloviev	6	CAN	Kaitlyn Weaver / Andrew Poje
8	ITA	Anna Cappellini / Luca Lanotte	6	RUS	Ekaterina Bobrova / Dmitri Soloviev	9	ITA	Federica Faiella / Massimo Scali
8	ITA	Anna Cappellini / Luca Lanotte	10	USA	Maia Shibutani / Alex Shibutani	9	ITA	Federica Faiella / Massimo Scali

=== Season's ranking (top 30) ===
==== Men's singles ====
As of May 2011

Rank	Nation	Skater			
Rank	Nation	Skater	1	CAN	Patrick Chan
2	JPN	Takahiko Kozuka			
3	RUS	Artur Gachinski			
4	JPN	Daisuke Takahashi			
5	JPN	Nobunari Oda			
6	FRA	Florent Amodio			
7	CZE	Tomas Verner			
8	ITA	Samuel Contesti			
9	USA	Jeremy Abbott			
10	CZE	Michal Brezina			

==== Ladies' singles ====
As of May 2011

Rank	Nation	Skater			
Rank	Nation	Skater	1	ITA	Carolina Kostner
2	JPN	Miki Ando			
3	USA	Alissa Czisny			
4	JPN	Akiko Suzuki			
5	FIN	Kiira Korpi			
6	RUS	Alena Leonova			
7	JPN	Kanako Murakami			
8	USA	Rachael Flatt			
9	RUS	Ksenia Makarova			
10	USA	Mirai Nagasu			

==== Pairs ====
As of May 2011

Rank	Nation	Skater			
Rank	Nation	Skater	1	GER	Aliona Savchenko / Robin Szolkowy
2	CHN	Qing Pang / Jian Tong			
3	RUS	Vera Bazarova / Yuri Larionov			
4	CHN	Wenjing Sui / Cong Han			
5	GER	Maylin Hausch / Daniel Wende			
6	CAN	Kirsten Moore-Towers / Dylan Moscovitch			
7	RUS	Tatiana Volosozhar / Maxim Trankov			
8	USA	Caitlin Yankowskas / John Coughlin			
9	RUS	Yuko Kavaguti / Alexander Smirnov			
10	CAN	Paige Lawrence / Rudi Swiegers			

==== Ice dance ====
As of May 2011

Rank	Nation	Skater			
Rank	Nation	Skater	1	FRA	Nathalie Péchalat / Fabian Bourzat
2	USA	Meryl Davis / Charlie White			
3	USA	Maia Shibutani / Alex Shibutani			
4	RUS	Ekaterina Bobrova / Dmitri Soloviev			
5	CAN	Vanessa Crone / Paul Poirier			
6	HUN	Nora Hoffmann / Maxim Zavozin			
7	CAN	Kaitlyn Weaver / Andrew Poje			
8	FRA	Pernelle Carron / Lloyd Jones			
9	RUS	Ekaterina Riazanova / Ilia Tkachenko			
10	ITA	Anna Cappellini / Luca Lanotte			
