= 2011 World Figure Skating Championships =

Annual figure skating competition held in 2011

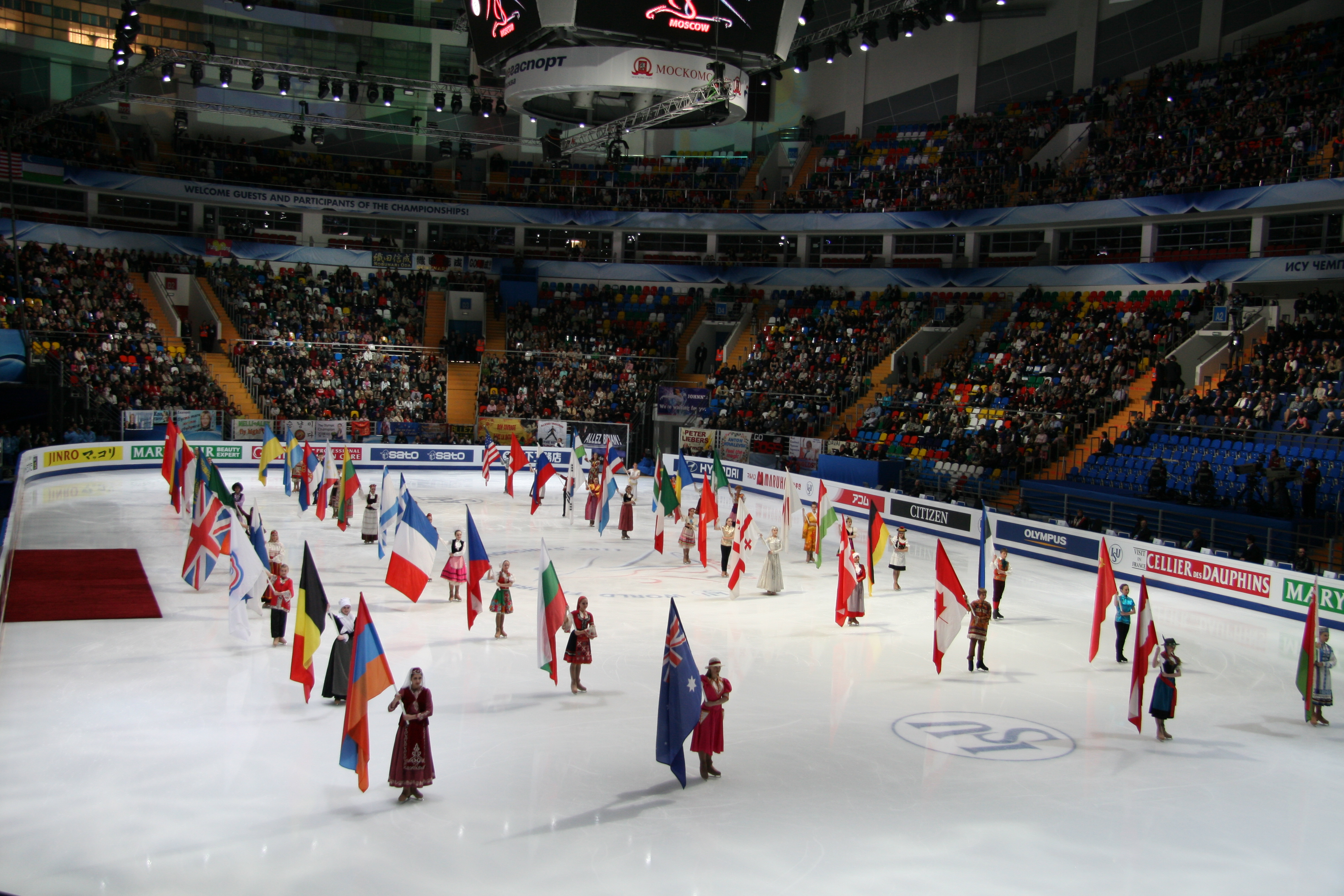
- Opening ceremony
- Type: ISU Championship
- Date: April 25 – May 1
- Season: 2010–11
- Location: Moscow, Russia
- Venue: Megasport Arena

Champions
- Men's singles: (Canada) Patrick Chan
- Ladies' singles: (Japan) Miki Ando
- Pairs: (Germany) Aliona Savchenko / Robin Szolkowy
- Ice dance: (United States) Meryl Davis / Charlie White
- Previous: 2010 World Championships
- Next: 2012 World Championships

The 2011 World Figure Skating Championships was a senior international figure skating competition in the 2010–11 season. Medals were awarded in the disciplines of men's singles, ladies' singles, pair skating, and ice dancing.

The competition was originally assigned to Nagano, Japan, and later moved to Tokyo, to be held from March 21–27 at the Yoyogi National Gymnasium with the Japan Skating Federation as the host organization. It was postponed in the wake of the 2011 Tōhoku earthquake and tsunami and later reassigned to Moscow, Russia.

== Reaction to the 2011 Tōhoku earthquake and tsunami ==
Immediately following the Tōhoku earthquake and tsunami that occurred on March 11, 2011, the JSF reported to the ISU that the competition venue was undamaged and the event would be held as planned. However, on March 13, the ISU released a statement saying that it was considering canceling the event and, later that day, the German skating federation announced that it would not send any skaters to the World Championships, with other countries undecided. Although most foreign skaters had planned to fly to Japan from March 16 and later, a few had already arrived in the country on March 11, among them European champion Florent Amodio, and were advised to return home by their skating federations, based on governmental travel advisories.

On March 14, 2011, the ISU published a statement that 2011 Worlds would not be held in Tokyo during the dates originally planned, and that a decision regarding rescheduling or a complete cancellation would be made after further evaluation. The ISU began considering various possibilities, including holding the event in another country. ISU President Ottavio Cinquanta suggested the event could be canceled or postponed until October, with the ISU saying they would make an announcement by March 21. The JSF head, Seiko Hashimoto, said that her federation was hoping to reschedule the event to September or October, but Japanese skating fans felt moving it to another country would be a better option. Although it would oblige a number of skaters to back out of agreements to appear in skating tours, an important source of income for many, many coaches and officials voiced their preference for April–May, citing greater complications arising from an autumn Worlds. However, others noted it would be very difficult for a new host to organize the event in under a month. Typically, a host country of a World Championships has over two years and the shortest period was in 2000 when France organized the event in seven months. On March 21, the ISU announced that the JSF had relinquished its hosting rights and that it was looking into alternate locations, while noting there would be major logistical challenges to organize the event on short notice. The criteriums to bid to hosts the new championships included a new start date in April or May, 700 hotel rooms, a host broadcaster in conditions to produce the event, and two rinks: The main rink to host the competition with a minimum 8000 seats available from the Thursday early morning through Sunday late evening of the following week, and a practice rink from Friday early morning through Friday late evening of the following week. Local expertise, good transportation infrastructure, and quick visa processing were also important factors. ISU President Ottavio Cinquanta said he would support a bid by the Japanese federation to host the 2014 or 2015 World Championships. In June 2011, Japan was chosen as the host country for the next championship with available dates who was the 2014 edition at the same proposed venue in Saitama.

== Bids for re-vote ==
On March 22, 2011, the International Skating Union announced that six candidates had applied to host the relocated championships.

- Vancouver, Canada
- Lake Placid or Colorado Springs, United States
- Moscow, Russia
- Zagreb, Croatia
- Turku, Finland
- Graz, Austria

On March 24, 2011, the ISU announced that Moscow's Megasport Arena had been chosen as the replacement host for the 2011 World Figure Skating Championships.

== Competition notes ==
Russia pledged to speed up processing of visas and Vladimir Putin dismissed concerns about the cost of organizing the event on short notice. The country had also accepted hosting duties of the World Pentathlon Championships after political instability caused Egypt to step down. The city of Moscow was expected to spend 200 million rubles (5 million euros or US$7 million) on the event.

2010 bronze medalist Laura Lepistö withdrew in early March due to a back injury and was replaced by Juulia Turkkila. Shawn Sawyer dropped out due to a scheduling conflict and was replaced by Kevin Reynolds, while Myriane Samson withdrew due to a knee injury and was replaced by Amelie Lacoste. Sinead Kerr and John Kerr dropped out to recover from shoulder surgery, and later announced their retirement.

== Qualification ==
The event was open to figure skaters from ISU member nations who had reached the age of 15 by July 1, 2010. Based on the results of the 2010 World Figure Skating Championships, each country was allowed between one and three entries per discipline. National associations selected their entries based on their own criteria.

Countries which qualified more than one country per discipline:

Spots	Men	Ladies	Pairs	Dance
3	Canada; Japan; United States	Japan	China; Russia	Canada; United States
2	Belgium; Czech Republic; France; Italy; Sweden	Canada; Finland; Italy; Russia; Korea; Sweden; United States	Canada; Germany; United States	France; Hungary; Israel; Italy; Russia (United Kingdom) Great Britain

Due to the large number of competitors, the men's, ladies', and ice dancing competitions required a preliminary round prior to the main competition. The top 12 men and ladies advanced to the short program and the top 10 ice dancing teams advanced to the short dance.

== Entries ==
195 athletes from 44 countries were scheduled to participate.

Country	Men	Ladies	Pairs	Ice dancing
Armenia	Sarkis Hayrapetyan			
Australia	Mark Webster	Cheltzie Lee		Danielle O'Brien / Gregory Merriman
Austria	Viktor Pfeifer	Belinda Schönberger	Stina Martini / Severin Kiefer	Kira Geil / Tobias Eisenbauer
Belarus	Vitali Luchanok		Lubov Bakirova / Mikalai Kamianchuk	Lesia Valadzenkava / Vitali Vakunov
Belgium	Jorik Hendrickx; Kevin van der Perren	Ira Vannut		
Bulgaria	Georgi Kenchadze	Hristina Vassileva	Alexandra Malakhova / Leri Kenchadze	Kristina Tremasova / Dimitar Lichev
Canada	Patrick Chan; Joey Russell; Kevin Reynolds	Cynthia Phaneuf; Amélie Lacoste	Meagan Duhamel / Eric Radford; Kirsten Moore-Towers / Dylan Moscovitch	Vanessa Crone / Paul Poirier; Tessa Virtue / Scott Moir; Kaitlyn Weaver / Andrew Poje
China	Song Nan	Geng Bingwa	Dong Huibo / Wu Yiming; Pang Qing / Tong Jian; Zhang Yue / Wang Lei	Huang Xintong / Zheng Xun
Chinese Taipei	Jordan Ju	Melinda Wang		
Czech Republic	Michal Březina; Tomáš Verner		Klára Kadlecová / Petr Bidař	Lucie Myslivečková / Matěj Novák
Denmark	Justus Strid	Karina Sinding Johnson		Katelyn Good / Nikolaj Sorensen
Estonia		Jelena Glebova	Natalya Zabiyako / Sergei Kulbach	
Finland	Bela Papp	Kiira Korpi; Juulia Turkkila		
France	Florent Amodio; Brian Joubert	Maé Bérénice Méité	Adeline Canac / Yannick Bonheur	Pernelle Carron / Lloyd Jones; Nathalie Péchalat / Fabian Bourzat
Georgia		Elene Gedevanishvili		Allison Reed / Otar Japaridze
Germany	Peter Liebers	Sarah Hecken	Maylin Hausch / Daniel Wende; Aliona Savchenko / Robin Szolkowy	Nelli Zhiganshina / Alexander Gazsi
(United Kingdom) Great Britain	David Richardson	Jenna McCorkell	Stacey Kemp / David King	Penny Coomes / Nicholas Buckland; Louise Walden / Owen Edwards
Greece		Georgia Glastris		
Hong Kong	Harry Hau Yin Lee	Tiffany Packard Yu		
Hungary	Tigran Vardanjan	Viktória Pavuk		Dora Turoczi / Balazs Major; Zsuzsanna Nagy / Máté Fejes
Ireland		Clara Peters		
Israel	Maxim Shipov		Danielle Montalbano / Evgeni Krasnapolski	Brooke Frieling / Lionel Rumi
Italy	Paolo Bacchini; Samuel Contesti	Carolina Kostner; Roberta Rodeghiero	Stefania Berton / Ondřej Hotárek	Anna Cappellini / Luca Lanotte; Charlene Guignard / Marco Fabbri
Japan	Takahiko Kozuka; Nobunari Oda; Daisuke Takahashi	Miki Ando; Mao Asada; Kanako Murakami	Narumi Takahashi / Mervin Tran	Cathy Reed / Chris Reed
Luxembourg		Fleur Maxwell		
Kazakhstan	Denis Ten			
Lithuania				Isabella Tobias / Deividas Stagniūnas
Mexico		Mary Ro Reyes		Corenne Bruhns / Benjamin Westenberger
Monaco	Kim Lucine			
Philippines		Mericien Venzon		
Romania		Sabina Măriuţă		
Russia	Artur Gachinski	Alena Leonova; Ksenia Makarova	Vera Bazarova / Yuri Larionov; Yuko Kavaguti / Alexander Smirnov; Tatiana Volosozhar / Maxim Trankov	Ekaterina Bobrova / Dmitri Soloviev; Elena Ilinykh / Nikita Katsalapov
Serbia		Marina Seeh		
Slovenia		Dasa Grm		
South Africa		Lejeanne Marais		
Korea	Kim Min-seok	Kim Yuna; Kwak Min-jeong		
Spain	Javier Fernández	Sonia Lafuente		Sara Hurtado / Adrià Díaz
Sweden	Alexander Majorov; Adrian Schultheiss	Joshi Helgesson; Viktoria Helgesson		
Switzerland	Mikael Redin	Bettina Heim		Ramona Elsener / Florian Roost
Thailand		Taryn Jurgensen		
Turkey	Kutay Eryoldaş	Birce Atabey		
Ukraine	Anton Kovalevski	Irina Movchan		Siobhan Heekin-Canedy / Alexander Shakalov
United States	Ryan Bradley; Richard Dornbush; Ross Miner	Alissa Czisny; Rachael Flatt	Amanda Evora / Mark Ladwig; Caitlin Yankowskas / John Coughlin	Madison Chock / Greg Zuerlein; Meryl Davis / Charlie White; Maia Shibutani / Alex Shibutani
Uzbekistan	Misha Ge			

== Schedule ==
(Moscow time, UTC+4)

- Sunday, April 24
  - Official practices
- Monday, April 25
  - 14:00 Qualification round: Men
- Tuesday, April 26
  - 12:00 Qualification round: Ice dancing
  - 15:30 Qualification round: Ladies
- Wednesday, April 27
  - 13:00 Men's short program
  - 18:30 Pairs short program
- Thursday, April 28
  - 13:30 Men's free skating
  - 18:30 Pairs free skating
- Friday, April 29
  - 13:30 Ladies short program
  - 18:30 Short dance
- Saturday, April 30
  - 13:30 Ladies' free skating
  - 18:30 Free dance
- Sunday, May 1
  - 14:00 Exhibitions

== Results ==
PR: Preliminary round

=== Men ===
Patrick Chan won the short program with a record score, while Nobunari Oda placed second and defending champion, Daisuke Takahashi, third. Chan also set record free skating and total scores to win his first World title, after previously winning two silvers. Takahiko Kozuka won his first medal at the World Championships, his previous best result being 6th in 2009. Artur Gachinski, the 2010 Junior World bronze medalist, won the bronze medal, becoming the first men's skater to medal at his senior Worlds debut since Evan Lysacek had done so in 2005; both won a bronze medal in Moscow.

In the men's free skating, Brian Joubert slashed his hand on his skate blade and left drops of blood all over the ice; he completed the program but later required medical attention. Also during the free skating, a screw in Daisuke Takahashi's skate came loose on his first jump. He was able to get it repaired and resumed his program within the three minutes allowed. Oda ruined his chances of a medal by doing an extra triple jump, resulting in a loss of 13 points. Florent Amodio used music with lyrics, which is not allowed in competitive skating with the exception of ice dancing. He was not given the normally required one-point penalty because not enough judges voted for it.

Rank	Name	Nation	Total points	PR		SP		FS	
1	Patrick Chan	Canada	280.98			1	93.02	1	187.96
2	Takahiko Kozuka	Japan	258.41	1	165.00	6	77.62	2	180.79
3	Artur Gachinski	Russia	241.86			4	78.34	3	163.52
4	Michal Březina	Czech Republic	233.61	3	130.87	7	77.50	5	156.11
5	Daisuke Takahashi	Japan	232.97			3	80.25	6	152.72
6	Nobunari Oda	Japan	232.50			2	81.81	9	150.69
7	Florent Amodio	France	229.68			5	77.64	7	152.04
8	Brian Joubert	France	227.67			9	71.29	4	156.38
9	Richard Dornbush	United States	222.42			11	70.54	8	151.88
10	Javier Fernández	Spain	218.26			14	69.16	10	149.10
11	Ross Miner	United States	217.93			13	70.40	11	147.53
12	Tomáš Verner	Czech Republic	216.87			8	75.94	13	140.93
13	Ryan Bradley	United States	212.71			12	70.45	12	142.26
14	Denis Ten	Kazakhstan	209.99			10	71.00	14	138.99
15	Peter Liebers	Germany	205.59	4	129.89	16	67.73	15	137.86
16	Anton Kovalevski	Ukraine	201.64			17	65.16	16	136.48
17	Kevin van der Perren	Belgium	197.10			15	68.34	18	128.76
18	Samuel Contesti	Italy	196.40			18	64.59	17	131.81
19	Jorik Hendrickx	Belgium	188.24	10	109.59	22	60.74	19	127.50
20	Kevin Reynolds	Canada	187.23			19	64.36	21	122.87
21	Paolo Bacchini	Italy	183.13	6	122.29	23	58.96	20	124.17
22	Song Nan	China	176.09			20	63.78	23	112.31
23	Kim Lucine	Monaco	171.93	8	117.78	24	58.81	22	113.12
24	Joey Russell	Canada	168.73	7	118.37	21	61.69	24	107.04
Did not advance to free skating
25	Adrian Schultheiss	Sweden				25	58.41		
26	Viktor Pfeifer	Austria		5	123.22	26	56.68		
27	Kim Min-seok	Korea		12	98.67	27	56.19		
28	Alexander Majorov	Sweden		2	136.64	28	54.24		
29	Maxim Shipov	Israel		9	116.42	29	50.10		
30	Misha Ge	Uzbekistan		11	109.39	30	49.61		
Did not advance to short program
31	Mark Webster	Australia		13	95.84				
32	Justus Strid	Denmark		14	95.16				
33	David Richardson	(United Kingdom) Great Britain		15	93.20				
34	Tigran Vardanjan	Hungary		16	91.16				
35	Mikael Redin	Switzerland		17	90.79				
36	Kutay Eryoldas	Turkey		18	86.60				
37	Stephen Li-Chung Kuo	Chinese Taipei		19	85.71				
38	Bela Papp	Finland		20	83.47				
39	Harry Hau Yin Lee	Hong Kong		39	82.39				
40	Vitali Luchanok	Belarus		40	81.51				
41	Sarkis Hayrapetyan	Armenia		41	77.25				
42	Georgi Kenchadze	Bulgaria		42	73.72				

=== Ladies ===
2010 Olympic champion Kim Yuna won the short program while Miki Ando placed second. Ando was first in the free skating to win her second World gold medal, her previous title being in 2007. Kim won her fifth World medal, silver, while Carolina Kostner won her third medal, a bronze. Kostner had also won the bronze in 2005, the previous time the event had been held in Moscow. The 2010 World champion, Mao Asada, was sixth.

Rank	Name	Nation	Total points	PR		SP		FS	
1	Miki Ando	Japan	195.79			2	65.58	1	130.21
2	Kim Yuna	Korea	194.50			1	65.91	2	128.59
3	Carolina Kostner	Italy	184.68			6	59.75	3	124.93
4	Alena Leonova	Russia	183.92			5	59.75	4	124.17
5	Alissa Czisny	United States	182.25			4	61.47	5	120.78
6	Mao Asada	Japan	172.79			7	58.66	6	114.13
7	Ksenia Makarova	Russia	167.22			3	61.62	9	105.60
8	Kanako Murakami	Japan	167.10			10	54.86	7	112.24
9	Kiira Korpi	Finland	164.80			9	55.09	8	109.71
10	Elene Gedevanishvili	Georgia	156.24			15	51.61	10	104.63
11	Sarah Hecken	Germany	155.83			12	52.73	11	103.10
12	Rachael Flatt	United States	154.61			8	57.22	14	97.39
13	Cynthia Phaneuf	Canada	152.78			13	52.62	12	100.16
14	Maé Bérénice Méité	France	150.44	1	98.88	11	53.26	15	97.18
15	Joshi Helgesson	Sweden	149.08	2	91.70	16	50.25	13	98.83
16	Amélie Lacoste	Canada	144.76	5	87.04	14	51.98	18	92.78
17	Viktoria Helgesson	Sweden	142.52			24	45.40	16	97.12
18	Geng Bingwa	China	140.78			19	47.89	17	92.89
19	Ira Vannut	Belgium	138.28	4	90.29	17	49.34	20	89.05
20	Juulia Turkkila	Finland	136.68	6	86.49	22	45.70	19	90.98
21	Cheltzie Lee	Australia	133.65			18	48.20	21	85.45
22	Jelena Glebova	Estonia	124.78	9	76.13	20	46.28	22	78.50
23	Irina Movchan	Ukraine	123.15	10	75.96	23	45.68	23	77.47
24	Jenna McCorkell	(United Kingdom) Great Britain	121.76			21	45.99	24	75.77
Did not advance to free skating
25	Sonia Lafuente	Spain		3	91.17	25	44.59		
26	Karina Johnson	Denmark		7	78.52	26	42.19		
27	Bettina Heim	Switzerland		12	72.74	27	37.23		
28	Daša Grm	Slovenia		8	77.42	28	36.63		
29	Belinda Schönberger	Austria		11	75.85	29	35.73		
30	Viktória Pavuk	Hungary				30	33.70		
Did not advance to short program
31	Roberta Rodeghiero	Italy		13	71.83				
32	Sabina Măriuţă	Romania		14	68.63				
33	Kwak Min-jeong	Korea		15	67.75				
34	Birce Atabey	Turkey		16	67.11				
35	Mericien Venzon	Philippines		17	66.94				
36	Lejeanne Marais	South Africa		18	65.99				
37	Hristina Vassileva	Bulgaria		19	65.26				
38	Melinda Wang	Chinese Taipei		20	63.32				
39	Clara Peters	Ireland		21	60.94				
40	Taryn Jurgensen	Thailand		22	57.75				
41	Mary Ro Reyes	Mexico		23	54.99				
42	Georgia Glastris	Greece		24	52.38				
43	Marina Seeh	Serbia		25	52.20				
44	Tiffany Packard Yu	Hong Kong		WD	51.72				

=== Pairs ===
Defending champions, Pang Qing / Tong Jian, were first after the short program, with Aliona Savchenko / Robin Szolkowy in second, and new Russian team, Tatiana Volosozhar / Maxim Trankov, in third. Savchenko and Szolkowy then won the free skating to win their third World title, reclaiming the crown they lost in 2010 and setting a new record score in the free skating and overall. They became Germany's second most successful pair at the event after Maxi Herber and Ernst Baier who won four World titles in the 1930s. Volosozhar and Trankov medaled after only a year together and at their first major international competition. Pang and Tong took the bronze.

In the short program, Eric Radford's nose was broken when Meagan Duhamel's elbow hit him on the descent from a twist, their first element, but they completed the program without a break; the pair were able to compete in the free skating, and finished seventh overall.

Rank	Name	Nation	Total points	SP		FS	
1	Aliona Savchenko / Robin Szolkowy	Germany	217.85	2	72.98	1	144.87
2	Tatiana Volosozhar / Maxim Trankov	Russia	210.73	3	70.35	2	140.38
3	Pang Qing / Tong Jian	China	204.12	1	74.00	3	130.12
4	Yuko Kavaguti / Alexander Smirnov	Russia	187.36	5	62.54	4	124.82
5	Vera Bazarova / Yuri Larionov	Russia	187.13	4	64.64	5	122.49
6	Caitlin Yankowskas / John Coughlin	United States	175.94	8	58.76	6	117.18
7	Meagan Duhamel / Eric Radford	Canada	173.03	7	58.83	7	114.20
8	Kirsten Moore-Towers / Dylan Moscovitch	Canada	163.17	10	56.86	8	106.31
9	Narumi Takahashi / Mervin Tran	Japan	160.10	6	59.16	10	100.94
10	Stefania Berton / Ondřej Hotárek	Italy	157.15	9	57.63	11	99.52
11	Amanda Evora / Mark Ladwig	United States	155.91	11	54.64	9	101.27
12	Maylin Hausch / Daniel Wende	Germany	149.65	12	53.90	12	95.75
13	Zhang Yue / Wang Lei	China	147.38	13	52.25	13	95.13
14	Dong Huibo / Wu Yiming	China	137.75	14	49.29	14	88.46
15	Klára Kadlecová / Petr Bidař	Czech Republic	132.51	15	45.20	15	87.31
16	Natalya Zabiyako / Sergei Kulbach	Estonia	126.56	16	44.35	16	82.21
Did not advance to free skating
17	Stacey Kemp / David King	(United Kingdom) Great Britain		17	44.14		
18	Adeline Canac / Yannick Bonheur	France		18	43.92		
19	Lubov Bakirova / Mikalai Kamianchuk	Belarus		19	38.20		
20	Danielle Montalbano / Evgeni Krasnopolski	Israel		20	37.43		
21	Stina Martini / Severin Kiefer	Austria		21	35.34		
22	Alexandra Malakhova / Leri Kenchadze	Bulgaria		22	30.10		

=== Ice dancing ===
The 2010 Olympic and World Champions, Tessa Virtue and Scott Moir, set a new world record score in the short dance, while Grand Prix Final champions Meryl Davis and Charlie White were second and European champions, Nathalie Pechalat and Fabian Bourzat, were third. Davis and White won the free dance to become the first ice dancers from the United States to win the World title. Virtue and Moir took the silver while Maia Shibutani and Alex Shibutani won the bronze medal in their first trip to the senior World Championships. It was the first North American sweep of the World ice dancing podium. All three medal-winning teams were led by Russian-born, American-based coaches, Igor Sphilband and Marina Zueva. The rest of the top ten was also dominated by Russian coaches: Nathalie Péchalat / Fabian Bourzat (Alexander Zhulin and Oleg Volkov), Kaitlyn Weaver / Andrew Poje (Anjelika Krylova), Ekaterina Bobrova / Dmitri Soloviev (Elena Kustarova and Svetlana Alexeeva), Elena Ilinykh / Nikita Katsalapov (Zhulin and Volkov), Anna Cappellini / Luca Lanotte (had gone to Nikolai Morozov a few months earlier) and Madison Chock / Greg Zuerlein (Shpilband / Zueva). Vanessa Crone / Paul Poirier had one Canadian coach, Carol Lane, and one Soviet-born, Yuri Razguliaiev.

Rank	Name	Nation	Total points	PR		SD		FD	
1	Meryl Davis / Charlie White	United States	185.27			2	73.76	1	111.51
2	Tessa Virtue / Scott Moir	Canada	181.79			1	74.29	2	107.50
3	Maia Shibutani / Alex Shibutani	United States	163.79			4	66.88	3	96.91
4	Nathalie Péchalat / Fabian Bourzat	France	163.54			3	70.97	6	92.57
5	Kaitlyn Weaver / Andrew Poje	Canada	160.32	1	87.22	7	65.07	4	95.25
6	Ekaterina Bobrova / Dmitri Soloviev	Russia	160.23			5	65.88	5	94.35
7	Elena Ilinykh / Nikita Katsalapov	Russia	154.50			6	65.51	10	88.99
8	Anna Cappellini / Luca Lanotte	Italy	153.77			8	64.12	9	89.65
9	Madison Chock / Greg Zuerlein	United States	151.86			9	61.47	7	90.39
10	Vanessa Crone / Paul Poirier	Canada	151.13			10	61.01	8	90.12
11	Nelli Zhiganshina / Alexander Gazsi	Germany	140.95	2	83.67	12	55.53	11	85.42
12	Pernelle Carron / Lloyd Jones	France	140.86			11	57.68	12	83.18
13	Cathy Reed / Chris Reed	Japan	133.33			13	54.86	13	78.47
14	Isabella Tobias / Deividas Stagniūnas	Lithuania	131.01	3	77.63	14	53.16	14	77.85
15	Siobhan Heekin-Canedy / Alexander Shakalov	Ukraine	128.70	5	75.00	15	52.31	15	76.39
16	Penny Coomes / Nicholas Buckland	(United Kingdom) Great Britain	126.29			17	51.75	16	74.54
17	Huang Xintong / Zheng Xun	China	123.01	4	75.45	16	52.17	17	70.84
18	Allison Reed / Otar Japaridze	Georgia	120.11	6	70.90	19	49.44	18	70.67
19	Charlene Guignard / Marco Fabbri	Italy	120.02			18	49.80	19	70.22
20	Louise Walden / Owen Edwards	(United Kingdom) Great Britain	116.52	9	68.58	20	46.73	20	69.79
Did not advance to free dance
21	Dora Turoczi / Balazs Major	Hungary				21	45.41		
22	Lucie Myslivečková / Matěj Novák	Czech Republic		8	68.96	22	45.02		
23	Sara Hurtado / Adrià Díaz	Spain		7	70.26	23	44.98		
24	Brooke Frieling / Lionel Rumi	Israel				24	44.43		
25	Ramona Elsener / Florian Roost	Switzerland		10	67.94	25	41.58		
Did not advance to short dance
26	Kira Geil / Tobias Eisenbauer	Austria		11	64.55				
27	Danielle O'Brien / Gregory Merriman	Australia		12	63.57				
28	Zsuzsanna Nagy / Máté Fejes	Hungary		13	58.70				
29	Katelyn Good / Nikolaj Sorensen	Denmark		14	57.04				
30	Corenne Bruhns / Benjamin Westenberger	Mexico		15	55.51				
31	Kristina Tremasova / Dimitar Lichev	Bulgaria		16	55.37				
32	Lesia Valadzenkava / Vitali Vakunov	Belarus		17	54.43				

== Medals summary ==
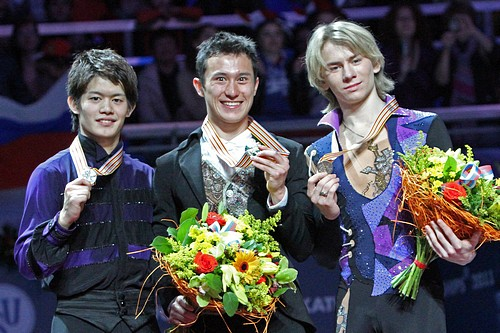
The men's medalists

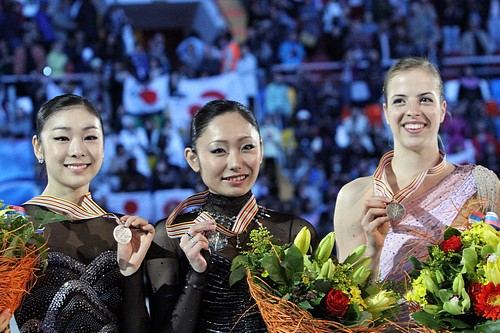
The ladies' medalists

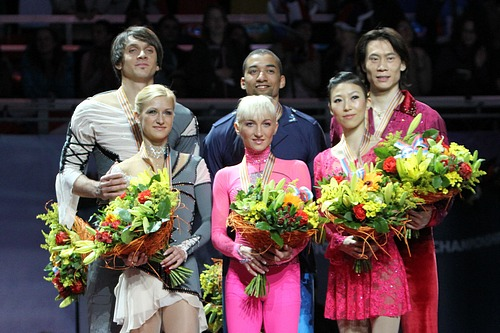
The pairs medalists

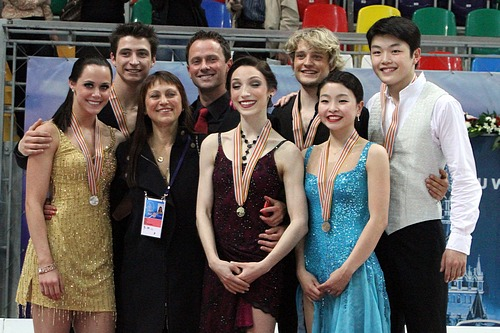
The ice dancing medalists with coaches Igor Shpilband and Marina Zueva.

=== Medalists ===
Medals for overall placement:

Discipline	Gold	Silver	Bronze
Men	(Canada) Patrick Chan	(Japan) Takahiko Kozuka	(Russia) Artur Gachinski
Ladies	(Japan) Miki Ando	(South Korea) Kim Yuna	(Italy) Carolina Kostner
Pair skating	(Germany) Aliona Savchenko / Robin Szolkowy	(Russia) Tatiana Volosozhar / Maxim Trankov	(China) Pang Qing / Tong Jian
Ice dancing	(United States) Meryl Davis / Charlie White	(Canada) Tessa Virtue / Scott Moir	(United States) Maia Shibutani / Alex Shibutani

Small medals for placement in the short segment:

Discipline	Gold	Silver	Bronze
Men	(Canada) Patrick Chan	(Japan) Nobunari Oda	(Japan) Daisuke Takahashi
Ladies	(South Korea) Kim Yuna	(Japan) Miki Ando	(Russia) Ksenia Makarova
Pair skating	(China) Pang Qing / Tong Jian	(Germany) Aliona Savchenko / Robin Szolkowy	(Russia) Tatiana Volosozhar / Maxim Trankov
Ice dancing	(Canada) Tessa Virtue / Scott Moir	(United States) Meryl Davis / Charlie White	(France) Nathalie Pechalat / Fabian Bourzat

Small medals for placement in the free segment:

Discipline	Gold	Silver	Bronze
Men	(Canada) Patrick Chan	(Japan) Takahiko Kozuka	(Russia) Artur Gachinski
Ladies	(Japan) Miki Ando	(South Korea) Kim Yuna	(Italy) Carolina Kostner
Pair skating	(Germany) Aliona Savchenko / Robin Szolkowy	(Russia) Tatiana Volosozhar / Maxim Trankov	(China) Pang Qing / Tong Jian
Ice dancing	(United States) Meryl Davis / Charlie White	(Canada) Tessa Virtue / Scott Moir	(United States) Maia Shibutani / Alex Shibutani

=== Medals by country ===
Table of medals for overall placement:

Rank	Nation	Gold	Silver	Bronze	Total
1	Canada (CAN)	1	1	0	2
1	Japan (JPN)	1	1	0	2
3	United States (USA)	1	0	1	2
4	Germany (GER)	1	0	0	1
5	Russia (RUS)	0	1	1	2
6	South Korea (KOR)	0	1	0	1
7	China (CHN)	0	0	1	1
7	Italy (ITA)	0	0	1	1
Totals (8 entries)		4	4	4	12

== Prize money ==
	Prize money (US$)	
Placement	Men's / Ladies' singles	Pairs / Ice dancers
1st	45,000	67,500
2nd	27,000	40,500
3rd	18,000	27,000
4th	13,000	19,500
5th	10,000	15,000
6th	7,000	10,500
7th	6,000	9,000
8th	5,000	7,500
9th	3,500	5,250
10th	3,000	4,500
11th	2,500	3,750
12th	2,000	3,000
Pairs and ice dancing couples split the amount. Total prize money: US$710,000.
