= Maxim Trankov =

Russian pair skater (born 1983)

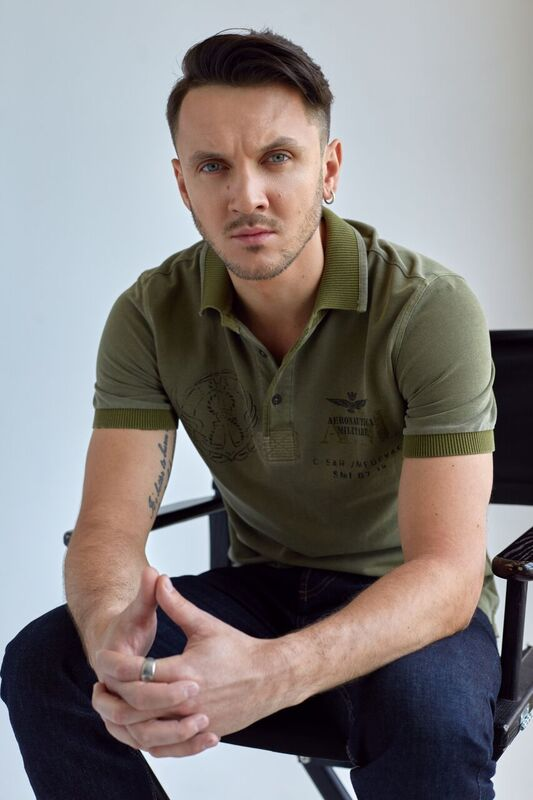

Personal information
- Full name: Maxim Leonidovich Trankov
- Born: 7 October 1983 (age 43) Perm, Russian SFSR, Soviet Union
- Height: 1.87 m (6 ft 2 in)

Figure skating career
- Country: Russia
- Partner: Tatiana Volosozhar
- Coach: Nina Mozer, Stanislav Morozov
- Skating club: Moscow Skating School "Vorobyovy Gory"
- Began skating: 1987
Medal record
Representing Russia (with Volosozhar)
Pairs' Figure skating
Olympic Games
Gold medal – first place	2014 Sochi	Pairs
Gold medal – first place	2014 Sochi	Team
World Championships
Gold medal – first place	2013 London	Pairs
Silver medal – second place	2011 Moscow	Pairs
Silver medal – second place	2012 Nice	Pairs
European Championships
Gold medal – first place	2012 Sheffield	Pairs
Gold medal – first place	2013 Zagreb	Pairs
Gold medal – first place	2014 Budapest	Pairs
Gold medal – first place	2016 Bratislava	Pairs
Grand Prix Final
Gold medal – first place	2012–2013 Sochi	Pairs
Silver medal – second place	2011–2012 Quebec	Pairs
Silver medal – second place	2013–2014 Fukuoka	Pairs
Russian Championships
Gold medal – first place	2011 Saransk	Pairs
Gold medal – first place	2013 Sochi	Pairs
Gold medal – first place	2016 Yekaterinburg	Pairs
Representing Russia (with Mukhortova)
Pairs' Figure skating
European Championships
Silver medal – second place	2008 Zagreb	Pairs
Bronze medal – third place	2009 Helsinki	Pairs
Bronze medal – third place	2010 Tallinn	Pairs
Russian Championships
Gold medal – first place	2007 Mytishchi	Pairs
Silver medal – second place	2008 Saint Petersburg	Pairs
Silver medal – second place	2009 Kazan	Pairs
Silver medal – second place	2010 Saint Petersburg	Pairs
Bronze medal – third place	2006 Kazan	Pairs
Winter Universiade
Bronze medal – third place	2005 Innsbruck	Pairs
World Junior Championships
Gold medal – first place	2005 Kitchener	Pairs
Bronze medal – third place	2004 The Hague	Pairs
Junior Grand Prix Final
Gold medal – first place	2004–2005 Helsinki	Pairs
Bronze medal – third place	2003–2004 Malmö	Pairs

Maxim Leonidovich Trankov (Russian: Максим Леонидович Траньков; born 7 October 1983) is a Russian pair skater. With Tatiana Volosozhar, he is a two-time 2014 Olympic champion in the pairs and in team events, the 2013 World champion, a four-time (2012, 2013, 2014, 2016) European champion, the 2012 Grand Prix Final champion, and a three-time (2011, 2013, 2016) Russian national champion. They have also won six events on the Grand Prix series.

With former partner Maria Mukhortova, Trankov is the 2008 European silver medalist, the 2007 Russian national champion, and the 2005 World Junior champion.

Trankov and Volosozhar are the first figure skaters to win two gold medals at the same Olympics, having taken gold in pairs and in the inaugural team event.

== Early life ==
Trankov was born in Perm. His mother competed in running and 400 meter hurdles, while his father Leonid was involved in equestrian sports and taught him to ride a horse. Leonid Trankov died on 20 January 2013.

Trankov first stepped onto the ice in the fall of 1987 in Perm; his parents wanted him involved in a sport. He left skating for a while but returned and joined the husband-and-wife coaches Valeri Tiukov and Valentina Tiukova. Trankov was growing quite tall and a coach suggested he take up pair skating when he was 11. He recalled, "I said no at first because I was afraid to grab the hand of a girl, but I tried it and then I liked it."

He first skated with Olesya Korchagina for two years, then Ksenia Vasilieva for two years, then Irina Bogomolova. In the summer of 1999 at age 15, he was invited to Saint Petersburg to skate with Irina Ulanova, the daughter of Lyudmila Smirnova and Alexei Ulanov.

Trankov and fellow pair skater Alexander Smirnov lived at the rink, sleeping in the stands or in the coaches' room, and struggled for food but told their parents they were staying in a dormitory. After about a year and a half, Trankov moved in with soldiers who had quarters under the tribune. He was given one free cafeteria meal a day and someone would occasionally bring him food. After three years, he was able to get his own apartment.

Ulanova/Trankov skated together for three years and were fifth at the Russian Junior Championships, but the partnership dissolved when he was 18 due to height and jumping issues. An acquaintance suggested a partner in the United States but Trankov's visa application was declined. He joined husband-and-wife coaches Ludmila Velikova and Nikolai Velikov shortly after in 2002. He skated for one year with Natalia Shestakova; had he joined the group a few months earlier, the Velikovs would have paired him with Julia Obertas. Maria Mukhortova / Pavel Lebedev were also in the same practice group; in 2002, Mukhortova declined to switch partners due to her good results with Lebedev but friction with him would lead her to accept Trankov's offer a year later.

== Partnership with Mukhortova ==
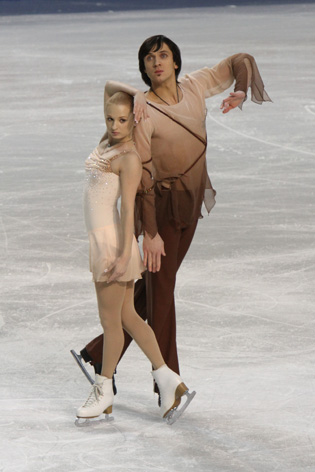
Mukhortova and Trankov at the 2010 European Championships

Trankov teamed up with Mukhortova in 2003. They were coached by Ludmila Velikova and Nikolai Velikov. In their first season together, they won the bronze medal at the Junior Grand Prix Final and at the World Junior Championships, both times placing behind Shestakova/Lebedev. They also won the Russian junior title. The following season, they won gold medals on the junior Grand Prix circuit and also debuted on the senior Grand Prix circuit at 2004 Cup of Russia where they finished 6th. They went on to win the Junior Grand Prix Final and then the 2005 World Junior title.

During the 2005–06 season, Mukhortova/Trankov were given two senior Grand Prix assignments. They placed seventh at Skate Canada and fourth at Cup of Russia. Having taken the bronze medal at the senior Russian Nationals, the pair was sent to the 2006 World Championships following the withdrawal of Olympic champions Tatiana Totmianina / Maxim Marinin. They finished 12th in their senior World debut.

Early in their career together, they were known for their stormy partnership and frequent coaching changes. The Velikovs suggested he team up with Tatiana Volosozhar but the topic was dropped following the 2006 World Championships when the pair switched coaches to Tamara Moskvina. Arguments between Trankov and Mukhortova were frequent and they split up briefly. Although Trankov was interested in skating with Volosozhar, he assumed she would decline because she appeared happy in her partnership with Stanislav Morozov. He resumed skating with Mukhortova but the quarrels continued and Moskvina transferred the pair to Artur Dmitriev in August 2006. In a 2011 interview, Trankov conceded they had not been ideal students, "Frankly, if I were her I would have kicked us out even earlier." In late 2006, they were on the verge of ending their career together, however, Tatiana Tarasova dissuaded them and contacted Oleg Vasiliev to take them on as students. The pair began working with him in December 2006.

During the 2006–07 season, Mukhortova/Trankov placed fifth at Skate America and seventh at Cup of Russia. They then won the Russian national title, finishing nearly 14 points ahead of silver medalists Julia Obertas / Sergei Slavnov, but had to withdraw from the 2007 European Championships after Mukhortova sustained an injury in practice. The pair returned in time for the World Championships but made little improvement on their previous season's result, placing 11th.

The following season, Mukhortova/Trankov won their first Grand Prix medal, bronze at 2007 Trophée Eric Bompard and placed fourth at Cup of Russia. They were unable to defend their national title, placing second to Yuko Kavaguti / Alexander Smirnov with a gap of ten points. They finished ahead of Kavaguti/Smirnov by two points at the 2008 European Championships and won the silver medal. Mukhortova/Trankov then placed seventh at the 2008 World Championships. They had to take a short break in the middle of their long program at Worlds due to swelling in Trankov's arm and completed the program after some alterations to his costume. Vasiliev said Trankov had a problem with his arm which took a couple months to ascertain and treat. When the season ended, Vasiliev focused on improving Trankov's basic skating, noting Aliona Savchenko / Robin Szolkowy's deep edges and flow. His coaches in Perm had not emphasized these skills but Vasiliev was pleased by Trankov's progress toward making up the deficit. They also worked on the triple twist to improve the split and add more difficulty.

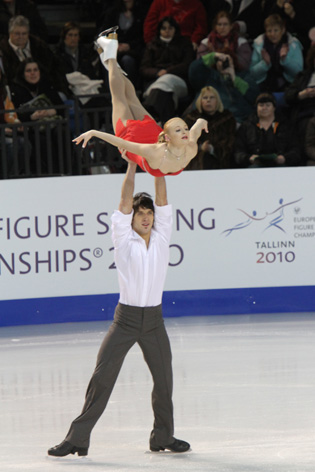
Mukhortova/Trankov perform a carry lift with the man in a spread eagle

During the preceding season, Trankov had been skating with a neck injury, which first appeared during the Grand Prix events. He said, "I luxated the first cervical vertebrae, and this is the one that holds the head. The doctor told me that you can't fix it with massage but only with osteopathy which needs a lot of time. We're doing that now and I feel that my body is adjusting. My body already orientated itself to the left. I adjusted to the left, for the jumps and for everything else, and that wasn't good. It's better now and I didn't have any problems anymore with my arm during the last one and a half months. Obviously I was doing less lifts and twists, but I started doing more now and so far it's fine." For a time, however, the injury had put his future in doubt and led Mukhortova to try out with a French skater.

In the 2008–09 season, Mukhortova/Trankov enjoyed considerable success with their short program, but tended to struggle in the long. They won the bronze medal at 2008 Skate America and silver at 2008 Trophée Eric Bompard, qualifying them for their first senior Grand Prix Final where they finished sixth. After placing second behind Kavaguti/Smirnov for the second year at the Russian Championships, they took the bronze medal at the 2009 European Championships and finished fifth at the 2009 World Championships.

For the 2009–10 season, Mukhortova/Trankov were assigned to the Trophee Eric Bompard. They set a new overall personal best score and won the gold medal ahead of two-time World champions Aliona Savchenko / Robin Szolkowy. They were silver medalists at their second Grand Prix event, Skate Canada, and won another bronze medal at the 2010 European Championships. The pair finished seventh at the 2010 Winter Olympics and fourth at the 2010 World Championships held in Turin, Italy, in March 2010. Shortly thereafter, they decided to split. Trankov cited tensions in the working relationship with Vasiliev and said he even considered retiring from competitive skating. He and Mukhortova continued skating together in shows until the end of April due to contractual obligations.

== Partnership with Volosozhar ==
=== Beginnings ===
In March 2010, rumors emerged that Trankov might team up with the Ukrainian Tatiana Volosozhar.

Trankov moved from Saint Petersburg to train in Moscow, beginning training with Volosozhar the week of 17 May. They are coached by Nina Mozer. Stanislav Morozov is their assistant coach, helping them with their elements. Igor Tchinaev was their short program choreographer, with Nikolai Morozov choreographing the long program. Nikolai Morozov also worked with them on their stroking to reduce energy loss. The pair had some differences in technique—Volosozhar had to change pace on the entry to the twist as well as adapt to a different hold during throw jumps, while Trankov had to adjust his jumps to match his new partner.

=== 2010–2011 season ===
Volosozhar/Trankov initially performed in domestic Russian cup events and other tests. In late December 2010, they won gold at the 2011 Russian Championships, defeating Yuko Kavaguti / Alexander Smirnov, the reigning national champions and World bronze medalists.

Per ISU regulations, Volosozhar was barred from international competition for one year from her last event representing Ukraine, the 2010 Winter Olympics. As a result, the pair missed much of the 2010–11 season, including the Grand Prix series and the European Championships. She became eligible for international competition on 16 February 2011, in time for the Mont Blanc Trophy, where the pair competed in order to meet the ISU's minimum technical score requirements for the World Championships. They did so easily and won the event by a sizable margin. The pair decided to fly in early for the World Championships and landed in Tokyo three hours before the earthquake. The event was rescheduled and moved to Moscow.

At the 2011 Worlds, Volosozhar/Trankov placed third in the short program, second in the free skate, and won the silver medal behind 2008–09 champions Aliona Savchenko / Robin Szolkowy and ahead of the defending champions, Qing Pang / Jian Tong. It was the first World medal for both partners. The pair are one of few in modern times to reach the World podium in their first season together and in their first appearance at a major international event. Media coverage of the event noted their fast development and their potential for the future. Volosozhar said, "We didn't even think about the silver medal (before Worlds). We thought, maybe we can get the bronze. The result was completely unexpected for us. The most impressive moment of the championships was how enthusiastic the spectators were even before our short program, and I'll never forget how they gave us a standing ovation after the free program."

=== 2011–2012 season ===
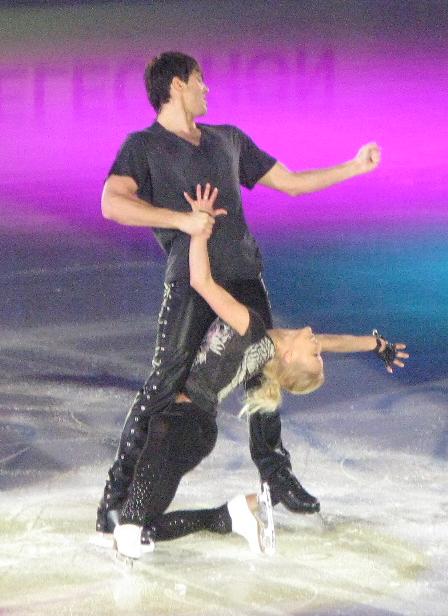
Volosozhar/Trankov at 2012 World Championships.

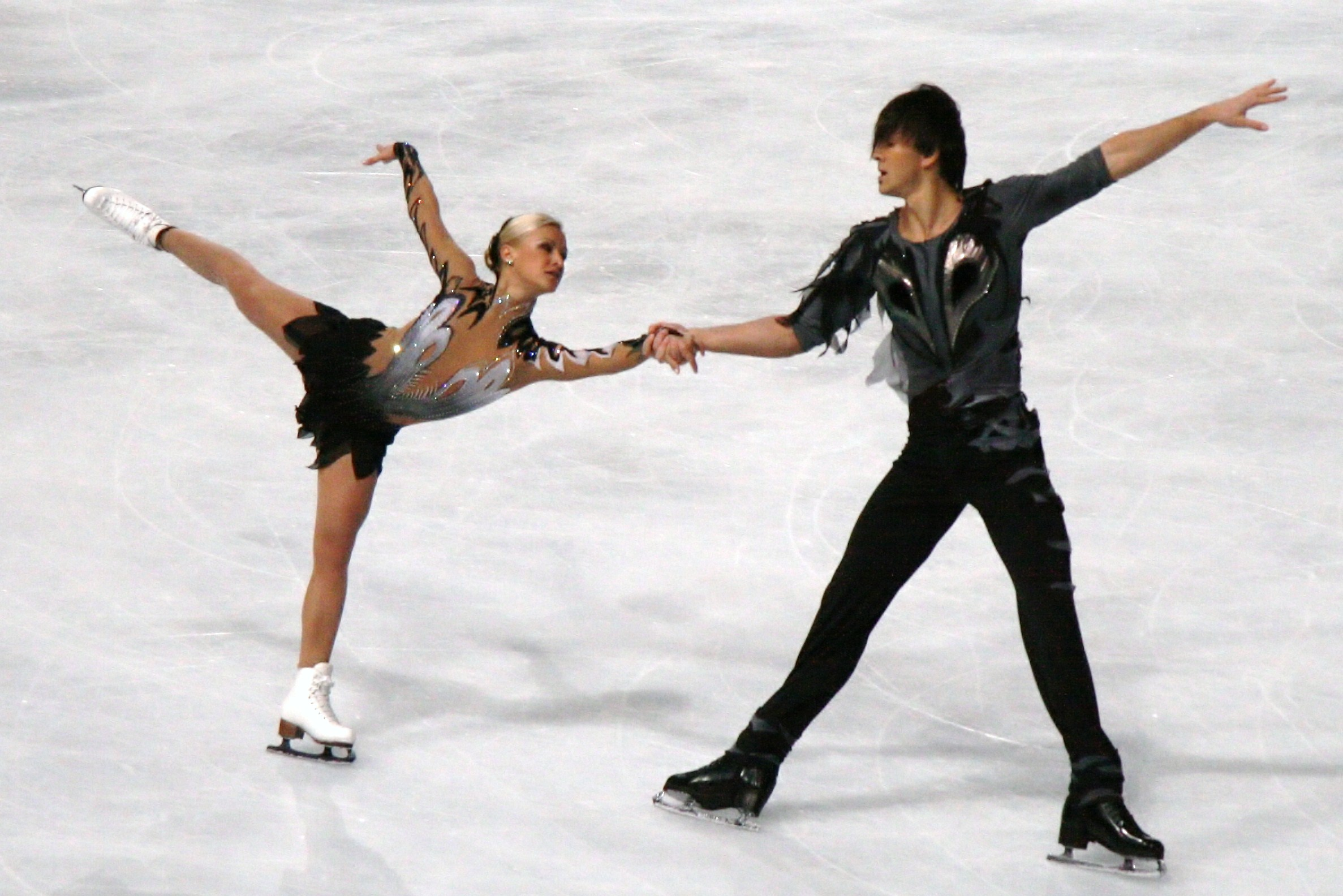
Volosozhar and Trankov at the 2011 Trophée Bompard

During the off-season, Volosozhar/Trankov performed in shows and prepared for the new season in Novogorsk, as well as a few weeks in New Jersey. In the summer, Trankov sustained a shoulder injury while skating on unsharpened blades since no one with the expertise was available at the time; As a result, they stopped working on lifts for a while.

Volosozhar/Trankov began the 2011–12 season with wins at their two September competitions, the 2011 Nebelhorn Trophy and the 2011 Ondrej Nepela Memorial. Trankov partly tore a groin tendon at the Nepela Memorial. On the Grand Prix series, the pair won Skate Canada with a combined score of 201.38 points and then won the 2011 Trophée Eric Bompard to qualify for the Grand Prix Final. Trankov's inguinal rings (groin) injury caused them to change a pair spin at the Grand Prix Final. Volosozhar/Trankov were the leaders after the short program but placed second to Savchenko/Szolkowy in the free skate and were awarded the silver medal — only 0.18 of point separating the two teams at the end of the competition. At the post-event press conference, they said they would miss Russian Nationals in order to recover fully from their injuries.

At the 2012 European Championships, Volosozhar/Trankov placed first in both programs and won their first European title. They were eighth in the short program at the 2012 World Championships in Nice, France, after both fell on a death spiral. Trankov commented on the ice quality, saying "It is soft in some places, brittle in others. I guess it is ok if you skate right after ice resurfacing, but if you are the last one to skate in the second group, it is quite another story." Volosozhar/Trankov rebounded to place first in the free skate with a new personal best score of 140.90 in the segment. With a total score 0.11 points less than Savchenko/Szolkowy, they won their second World silver medal and received a small gold medal for the free skate.

=== 2012–2013 season ===
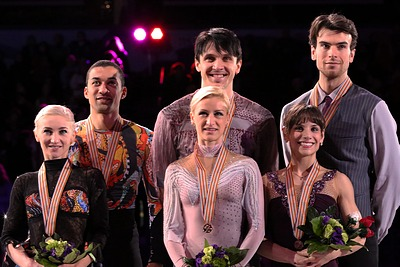
Volosozhar and Trankov at the 2013 World Championships podium.

In preparation for the 2012–13 season, the pair spent nearly three months in the U.S. in the summer of 2012 and then spent some time training in Italy. Volosozhar/Trankov won both of their Grand Prix assignments, the 2012 Skate America and the 2012 Cup of Russia, and qualified for the 2012–13 Grand Prix Final in Sochi, Russia. At the Final, they were first in the short program, second in the long program, and won the gold medal ahead of Russian teammates Vera Bazarova / Yuri Larionov. Volosozhar/Trankov then won their second national title, at the 2013 Russian Championships.

Trankov's father died of a sudden heart attack on 20 January 2013, a few days before the 2013 European Championships; an official confirmed the pair would compete at the event. They placed first in both programs and won the gold medal with a total score of 212.45—more than seven points ahead of silver medalists Aliona Savchenko / Robin Szolkowy. At the post-event press conference, Volosozhar said, "It is difficult to raise the mood at this time, but I am glad we made the decision to compete here." Volosozhar/Trankov spent some time training in West Orange, New Jersey just prior to the 2013 World Championships in London, Ontario. In March, the pair won their first World title, placing first in both programs and finishing 20.15 points overall ahead of Savchenko/Szolkowy. They set a new pairs' world record in the free skate and combined score (225.71 points) and became Russia's first pairs gold medalists since 2005 when Totmianina/Marinin won the World title. At their first team event, the 2013 World Team Trophy, Volosozhar/Trankov placed first in pairs and Team Russia finished fourth overall.

=== 2013–2014 season ===
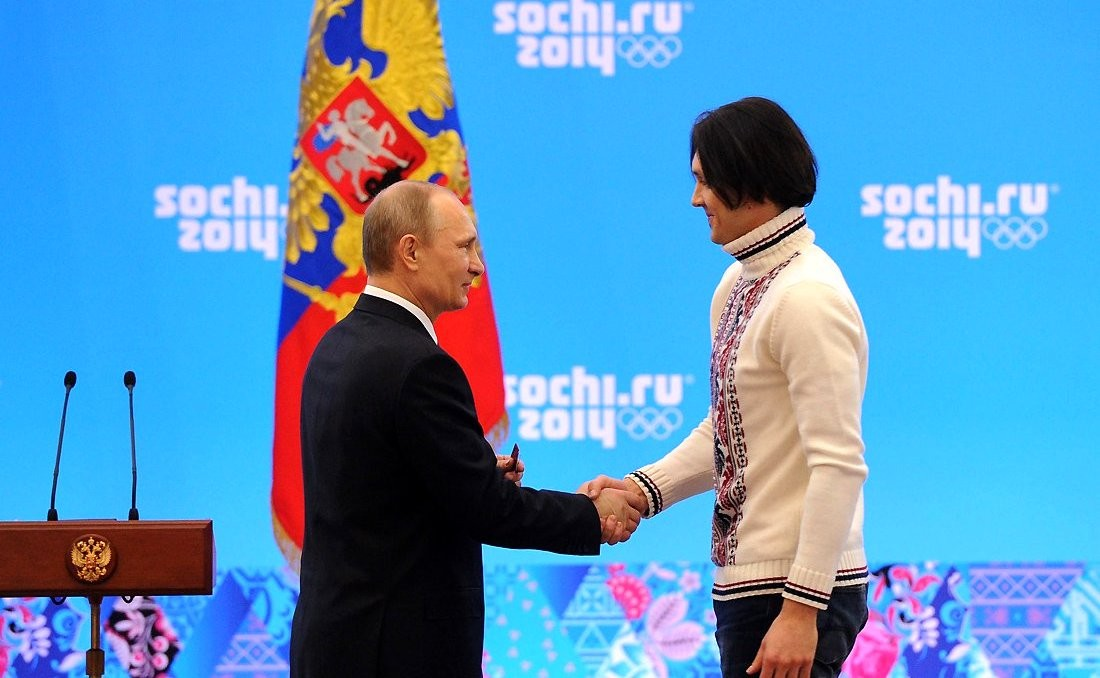
Trankov at the awarding ceremony for Russian athletes with President Vladimir Putin

Volosozhar/Trankov trained in Moscow, Sochi, West Orange, New Jersey, and Italy in preparation for the 2013–14 season and planned to perform in a reduced number of shows. The pair started their season with gold at the 2013 Nebelhorn Trophy, breaking their own world record scores and scoring a total of 231.96 points. They also won gold at their two Grand Prix events, the 2013 Skate America and 2013 NHK Trophy. At Skate America, Volosozhar/Trankov broke their world records again—posting scores of 83.05 (SP), 154.66 (FS), and 237.71 (total)—while at the NHK Trophy they obtained a total of 236.49 points. Having qualified for their third Grand Prix Final, they were second to Savchenko/Szolkowy in Fukuoka, Japan, and then took the gold medal at the 2014 European Championships in Budapest, Hungary.

Volosozhar/Trankov were sent to the 2014 Winter Olympics in Sochi and assigned to the short program in the inaugural team event. The pair placed first in their segment and Team Russia went on to win the gold medal. Volosozhar/Trankov broke their world record again in the pairs skate, posting a score of 84.17 to come in first in the short program and placed first in the free skate with an overall score of 236.86 points, winning the gold medal by more than 18.18 points ahead of silver medalists, teammates Ksenia Stolbova and Fedor Klimov. Trankov was the flag bearer of Russia at the closing ceremony of the 2014 Winter Olympics. Volosozhar/Trankov received the Order "For Merit to the Fatherland" Award 4th class with Russian President Vladimir Putin handing the state awards.

=== 2014–2015 season ===
For the 2014–2015 Grand Prix season, Volosozhar/Trankov were assigned to Skate America and Rostelecom Cup. However, the pair ultimately decided to withdraw due to Trankov's shoulder injury that will require a surgery. They decided to sit out the whole season for Trankov's surgery rehabilitation.

=== 2015–2016 season ===
For the 2015–2016 Grand Prix season, after sitting out the previous season; Volosozhar/Trankov returned to competition at the 2015 Nebelhorn Trophy where they won the gold medal with a score of 202.79 points. They were assigned to the 2015 Trophée Éric Bompard and the 2015 NHK Trophy as their Grand Prix events. Volosozhar and Trankov were first in the short program at the Trophee Eric Bompard, a result that became final after the second day of the competition was cancelled in the wake of the November 2015 Paris attacks. They withdrew from the NHK Trophy due to an injury suffered by Volosozhar. Recovering from her injury; Volosozhar and Trankov decided to compete at the 2016 Russian Championships scheduled on 24–27 December in Ekaterinburg, Russia. They placed first in both the short program and free skate to win their third National title.

On 27–31 January, Volosozhar and Trankov competed at the 2016 European Championships in Bratislava, Slovakia, took their fourth European title with a total of 222.66 points, outclassing the second-place finishers, Germans Aliona Savchenko and her new pairs partner Bruno Massot, by more than 22 points.

=== 2016–2017 season ===
Volosozhar and Trankov decided to skip the season, and announced they were expecting a baby.

== Television ==
He appeared in the sixth season of ice show contest Ice Age.

== Personal life ==
Trankov is a fan of Russian hip-hop and writes music himself. He has an older brother, Alexei.

In February 2015, it was publicly announced that he and his skating partner, Tatiana Volosozhar became engaged. They got married on 18 August 2015. They welcomed a daughter, Angelika, in February 2017. On 27 January 2021, Volosozhar announced that they were expecting a son in late May/early June 2021. They welcomed a son, Theodore, in May 2021.

== Programs ==
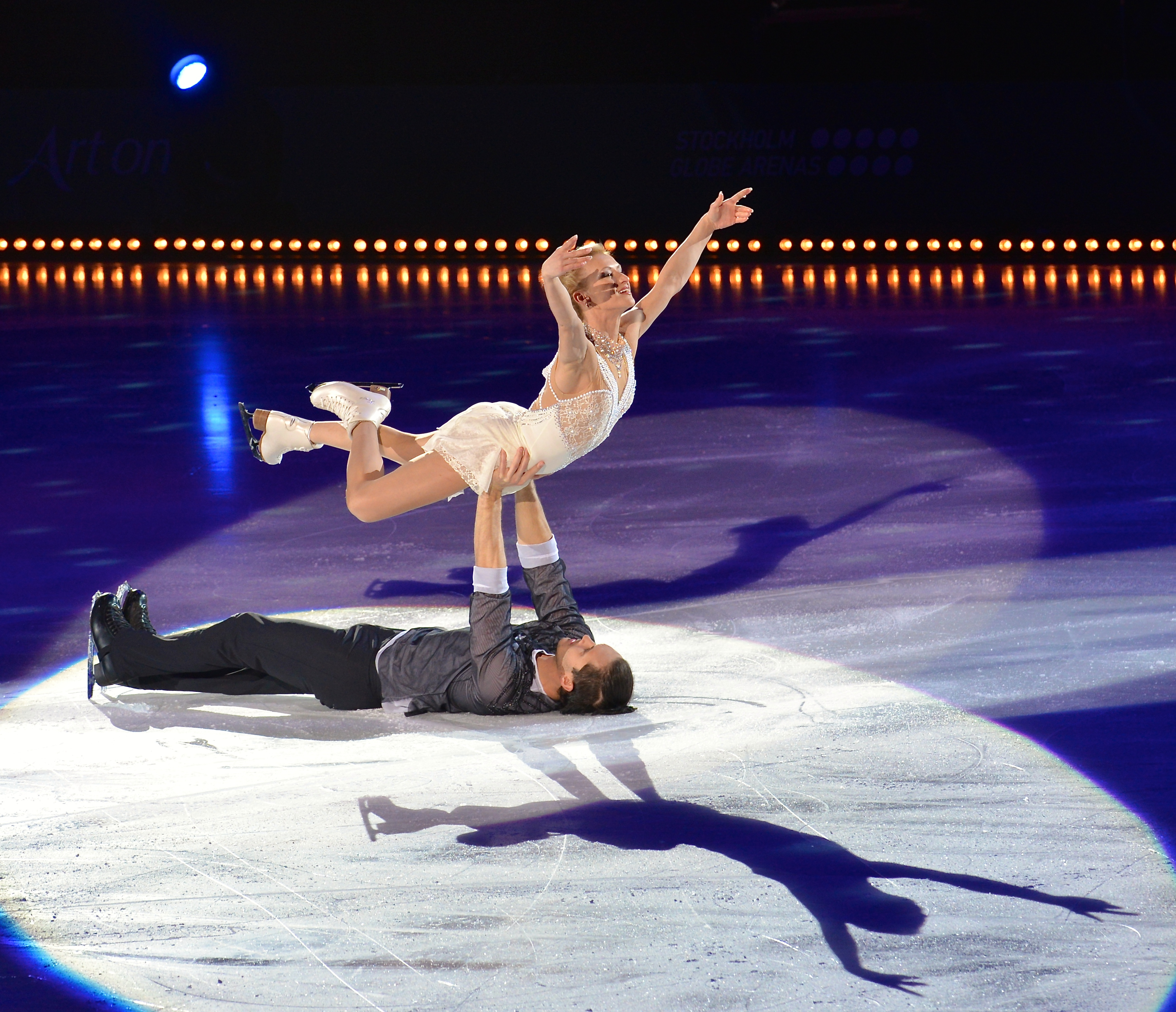
Tatiana Volosozhar & Maxim Trankov in Art on Ice 2014

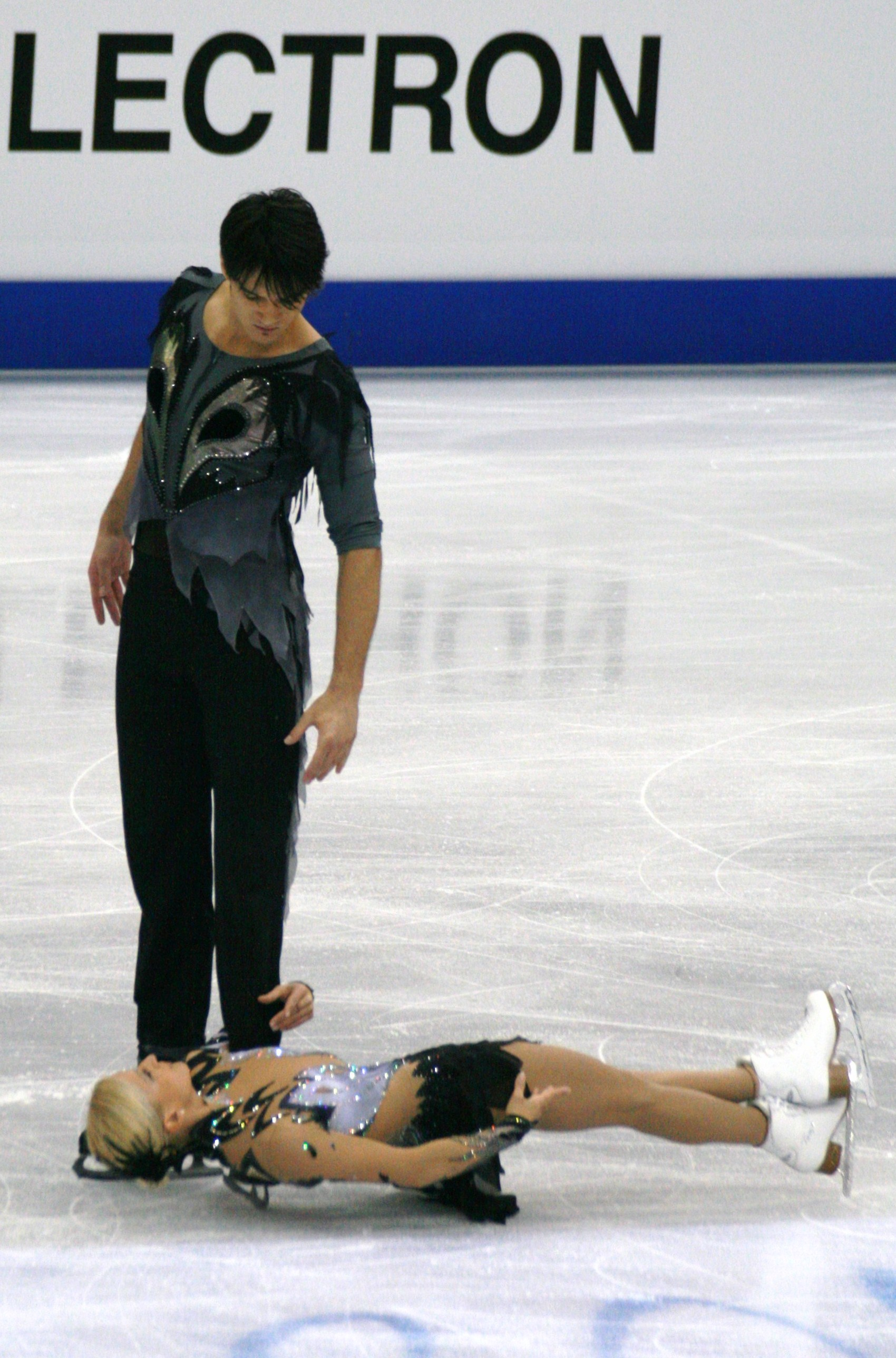
Volosozhar and Trankov at the 2012 World Championships

=== With Volosozhar ===
Season	Short program	Free skating	Exhibition
2015–2016	Nagada Sang Dhol Indian Themed Music by Siddharth-Garima choreo. by Nikolai Morozov	Bram Stoker’s Dracula by Wojciech Kilar; Van Helsing by Alan Silvestri choreo. by Nikolai Morozov	Opyat' Metel' (Russian: Опять Метель) (from The Irony of Fate 2) by Alla Pugacheva and Kristina Orbakaitė; Let's Do It, Let's Fall in Love performed by Tina Louise
2014–2015	Nagada Sang Dhol Indian Themed Music by Siddharth-Garima choreo. by Nikolai Morozov	Dracula by Philip Glass; Van Helsing by Alan Silvestri choreo. by Nikolai Morozov	Let's Do It, Let's Fall in Love performed by Tina Louise; Stars by Nelly Furtado; Another Love by Tom Odell
2013–2014	Masquerade Waltz by Aram Khachaturian	Jesus Christ Superstar by Andrew Lloyd Webber	Skyfall by Adele; One Man's Dream by Yanni
2012–2013	Love Theme from The Godfather by Nino Rota	Violin Muse by Ikuko Kawai (Based on: Partita for Violin No. 2 by Johann Sebastian Bach; Chaconne by Tomaso Vitali )	Opyat' Metel' (Russian: Опять Метель) (from The Irony of Fate 2) by Alla Pugacheva and Kristina Orbakaitė
2011–2012	Bring Me to Life by Evanescence arranged by Alex Goldstein	Black Swan by Clint Mansell, Pyotr Tchaikovsky choreo. by Nikolai Morozov	Yeah Right by Dionne Bromfield; Aimer (from Roméo et Juliette, de la Haine à l'Amour); Super Mario
2010–2011	Carmina Burana by Carl Orff choreographed by Igor Tchinaev	Romeo and Juliet by Sergei Prokofiev choreographed by Nikolai Morozov	Super Mario choreo. by Nikolai Morozov; L'Amore sei tu by Katherine Jenkins choreo. by Nikolai Morozov; Opyat' Metel' (Опять Метель) (from The Irony of Fate 2) by Alla Pugacheva, Kristina Orbakaitė choreo. by Alexander Zhulin; One Man's Dream by Yanni choreo. by Alexander Zhulin

=== With Mukhortova ===
Season	Short program	Free skating	Exhibition
2009–2010	Appassionata by Secret Garden	Love Story by Francis Lai; Cinema Paradiso Ennio Morricone and Andrea Morricone	Une Vie d'Amour sung by Mireille Mathieu and Charles Aznavour
2008–2009	Nobody Home by Pink Floyd performed by London Symphonic Orchestra	The Lady and the Hooligan by Dmitri Shostakovich	Соглашайся хотя бы на рай в шалаше by Diana Arbenina
2007–2008	Otonal by Raúl Di Blasio	Prelude in C sharp minor by Sergei Rachmaninov	Adagio by Secret Garden
2006–2007	Music for Cinema by Alfred Schnittke	Elegy by Sergei Rachmaninov	Tale of Wandering by Alfred Schnittke
2005–2006	Baxter (soundtrack)	Rhapsody on a Theme of Paganini by Sergei Rachmaninov	Russian: Дождик осенний from The Turkish Gambit (film) by Olga Krasko
2004–2005	Quidam from Cirque du Soleil by René Dupéré	El dia que me quieras by Raúl Di Blasio	Russian: Дождик осенний from The Turkish Gambit (film) by Olga Krasko
2003–2004	Melodies of the White Night soundtrack by Isaac Schwartz	El dia que me quieras by Raúl Di Blasio	Buddha Bar; Safri Duo

== Competitive highlights ==
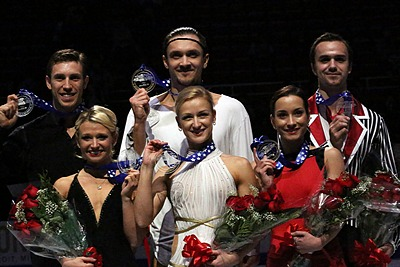
Volosozhar and Trankov at the 2013 Skate America

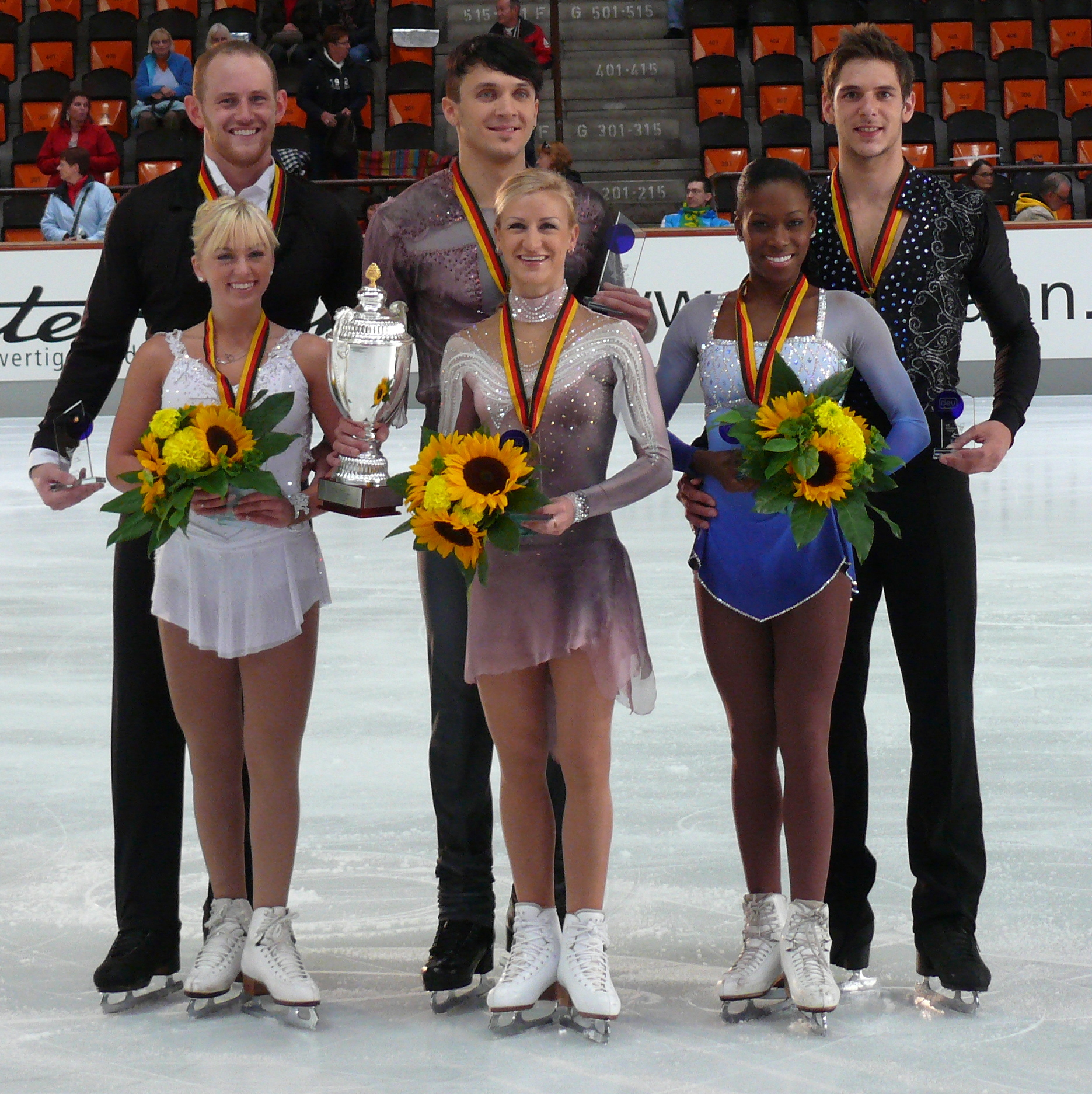
Volosozhar and Trankov at the 2012 Nebelhorn Trophy

=== With Volosozhar ===
Results
International
Event	2010–11	2011–12	2012–13	2013–14	2014–15	2015–16
Olympics				1st		
Worlds	2nd	2nd	1st			6th
Europeans		1st	1st	1st		1st
Grand Prix Final		2nd	1st	2nd		
GP Bompard		1st				1st
GP Cup of China					WD	
GP NHK Trophy				1st		WD
GP Rostelecom			1st			
GP Skate America			1st	1st	WD	
GP Skate Canada		1st				
Nebelhorn		1st	1st	1st		1st
Ondrej Nepela		1st				
Mont Blanc	1st					
National
Russian Champ.	1st		1st			1st
Team events
Olympics				1st T		
World Team			4th T 1st P			

=== With Mukhortova ===
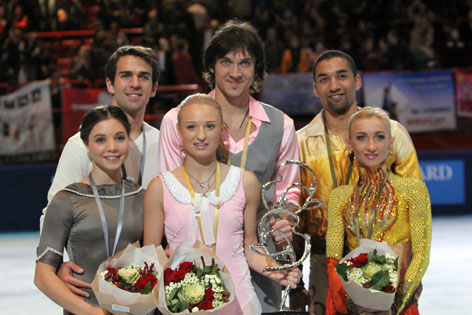
Trankov and former partner Maria Mukhortova at the 2009 Trophée Eric Bompard

Results
International
Event	2003–04	2004–05	2005–06	2006–07	2007–08	2008–09	2009–10
Olympics							7th
Worlds			12th	11th	7th	5th	4th
Europeans					2nd	3rd	3rd
Grand Prix Final						6th	4th
GP Bompard					3rd	2nd	1st
GP Cup of Russia		6th	4th	7th	4th		
GP Skate America				5th		3rd	
GP Skate Canada			7th				2nd
Finlandia					1st		
Nebelhorn						2nd	
Universiade		3rd					
International: Junior
Junior Worlds	3rd	1st					
JGP Final	3rd	1st					
JGP China		1st					
JGP Czech Rep.	1st						
JGP Germany		1st					
JGP Poland	1st						
National
Russian Champ.	1st J.	WD	3rd	1st	2nd	2nd	2nd

== Detailed results ==
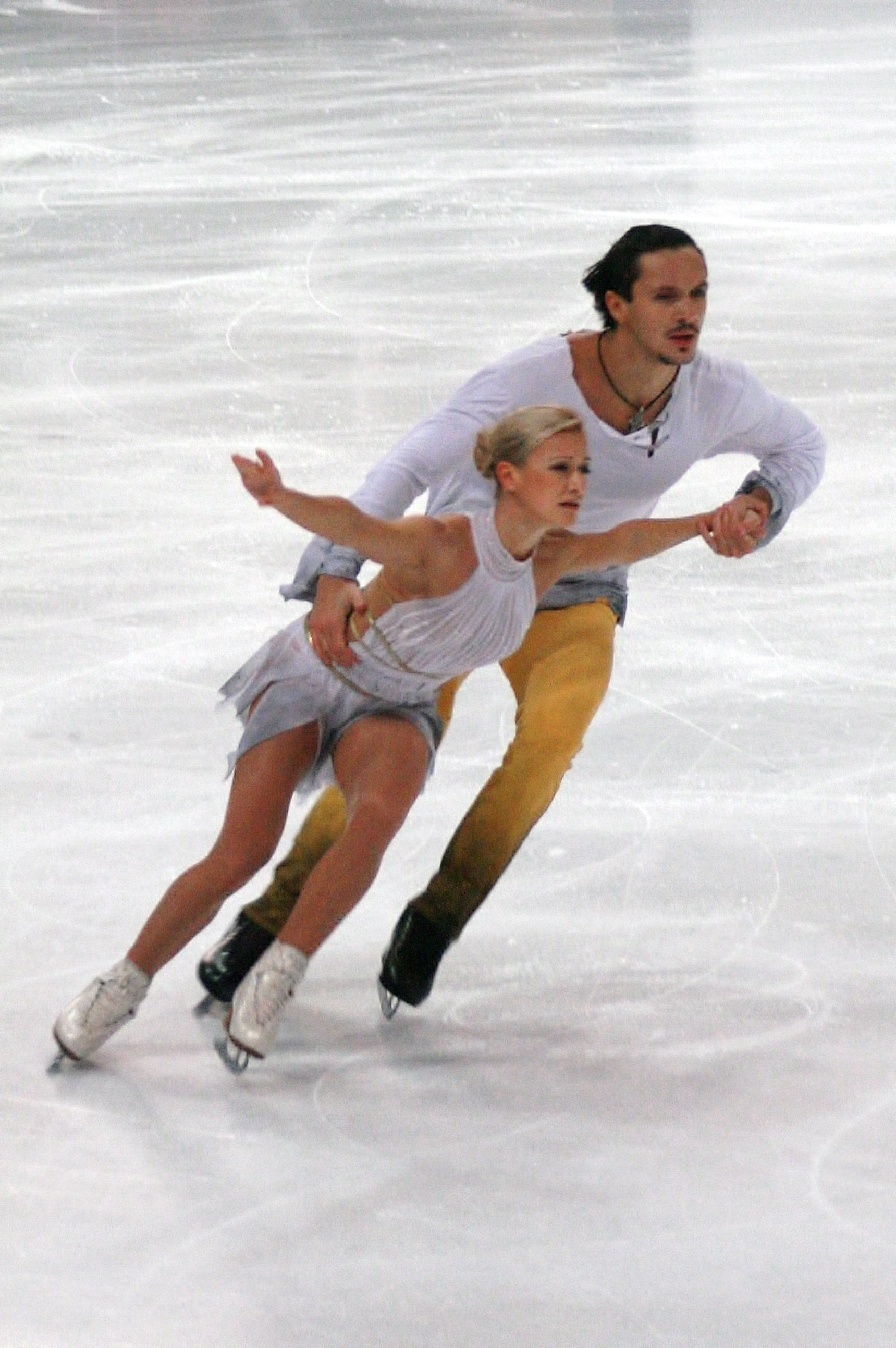
Volosozhar and Trankov at the 2013 Nebelhorn Trophy

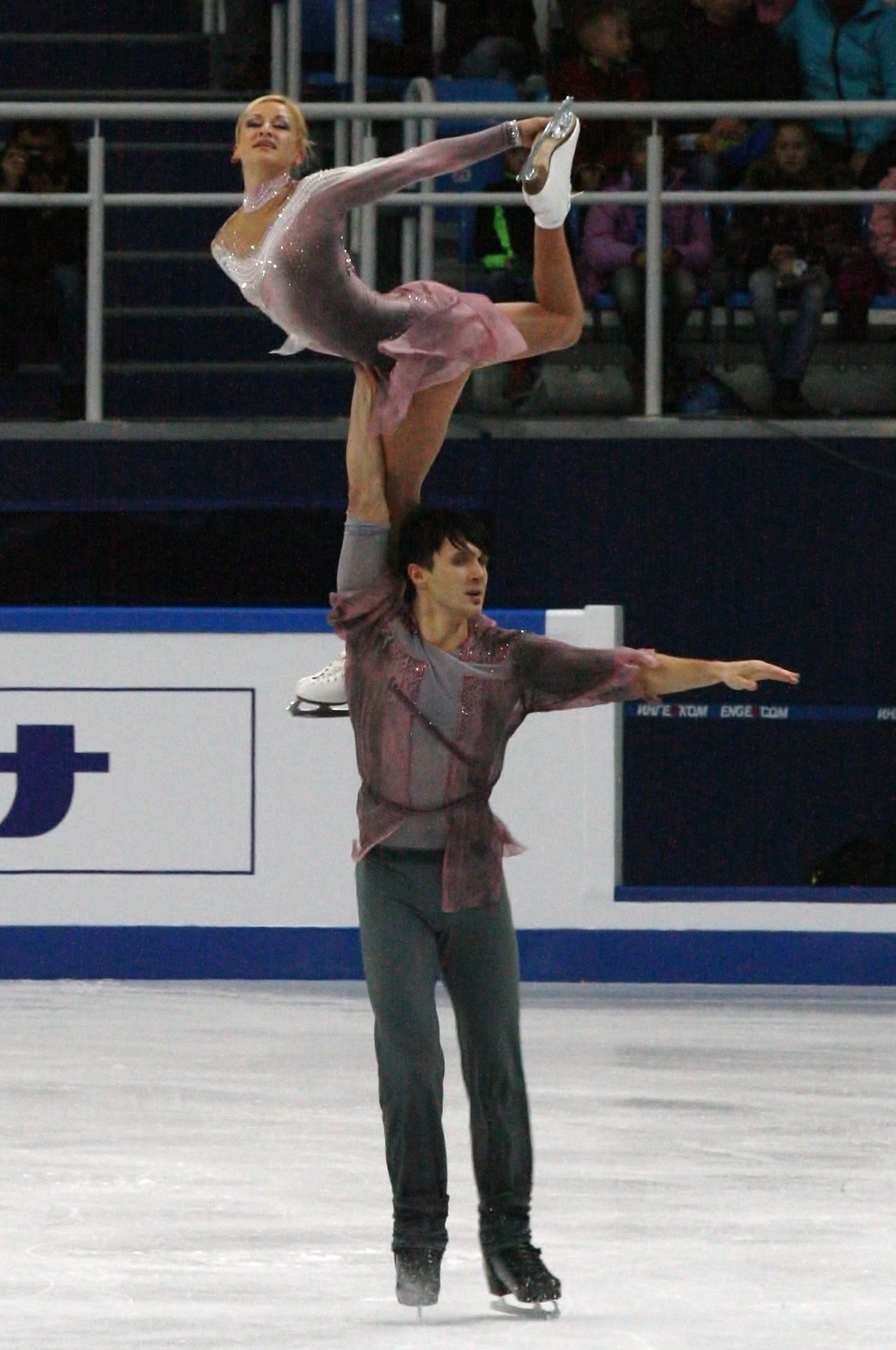
Volosozhar and Trankov at the 2012–13 Grand Prix Final

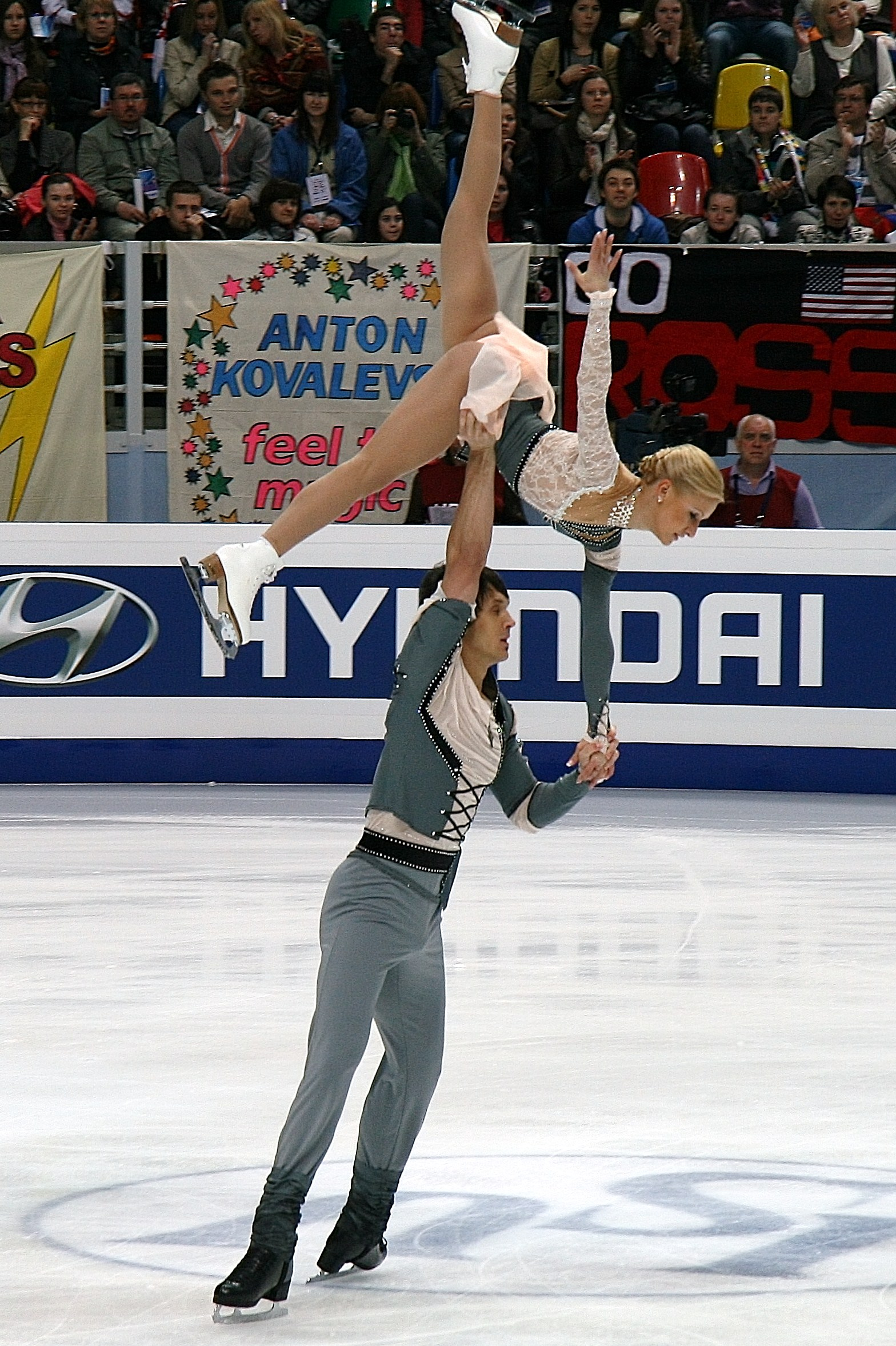
Volosozhar and Trankov at the 2011 World Championships

(Small medals for short and free programs awarded only at ISU Championships — Worlds, Europeans, and Junior Worlds. At team events, medals awarded for team results only.)

=== With Volosozhar ===
2015–16 season
Date	Event	SP	FS	Total
28 March – 3 April 2016	2016 World Championships	3; 77.13	7; 128.68	6; 205.81
26–31 January 2016	2016 European Championships	1; 79.77	1; 142.89	1; 222.66
23–27 December 2015	2016 Russian Championships	1; 83.65	1; 145.31	1; 228.96
13–15 November 2015	2015 Trophée Éric Bompard	1; 74.50	cancelled	1; 74.50
24–26 September 2015	2015 Nebelhorn Trophy	1; 64.87	1; 137.92	1; 202.79
2013–14 season
Date	Event	SP	FS	Total
6–22 February 2014	2014 Winter Olympics	1; 84.17	1; 152.69	1; 236.86
6–22 February 2014	2014 Winter Olympics (Team Event)	1; 83.79		1
15–19 January 2014	2014 European Championships	1; 83.98	2; 136.40	1; 220.38
5–8 December 2013	2013–14 Grand Prix Final	1; 82.65	2; 141.18	2; 223.83
8–10 November 2013	2013 NHK Trophy	1; 82.03	1; 154.46	1; 236.49
18–20 October 2013	2013 Skate America	1; 83.05	1; 154.66	1; 237.71
26–28 September 2013	2013 Nebelhorn Trophy	1; 81.65	1; 150.31	1; 231.96
2012–2013 season
Date	Event	SP	FS	Total
11–14 April 2013	2013 World Team Trophy	1; 74.41	1; 136.06	4T/1P; 210.47
13–15 March 2013	2013 World Championships	1; 75.84	1; 149.87	1; 225.71
23–27 January 2013	2013 European Championships	1; 73.23	1; 139.22	1; 212.45
25–28 December 2012	2013 Russian Championships	1; 78.69	1; 150.23	1; 228.92
6–9 December 2012	2012–13 Grand Prix Final	1; 73.46	2; 131.09	1; 204.55
9–11 November 2012	2012 Rostelecom Cup	1; 74.74	1; 132.79	1; 207.53
19–20 October 2012	2012 Skate America	1; 65.78	1; 129.29	1; 195.07
27–29 September 2012	2012 Nebelhorn Trophy	1; 65.24	1; 131.31	1; 196.55
2011–2012 season
Date	Event	SP	FS	Total
26 March – 1 April 2012	2012 World Championships	8; 60.48	1; 140.90	2; 201.38
23–29 January 2012	2012 Europeans Championships	1; 72.80	1; 137.65	1; 210.45
8–11 December 2011	2011–12 Grand Prix Final	1; 71.57	2; 140.51	2; 212.08
18–20 November 2011	2011 Trophée Eric Bompard	1; 63.69	1; 130.44	1; 194.13
27–30 October 2011	2011 Skate Canada	1; 70.42	1; 130.96	1; 201.38
28 Sep – 2 October 2011	2011 Nebelhorn Trophy	1; 66.48	1; 123.67	1; 190.15
21–24 September 2011	2011 Nebelhorn Trophy	1; 57.91	1; 125.74	1; 183.65
2010–2011 season
Date	Event	SP	FS	Total
25 April – 1 May 2011	2011 World Championships	3; 70.35	2; 140.38	2; 211.73
15–20 February 2011	2011 Mont Blanc Trophy	1; 68.30	1; 131.54	1; 199.84
26–29 December 2010	2011 Russian Championships	1; 72.71	1; 141.95	1; 214.66
