= Brooke Frieling =

American ice dancer

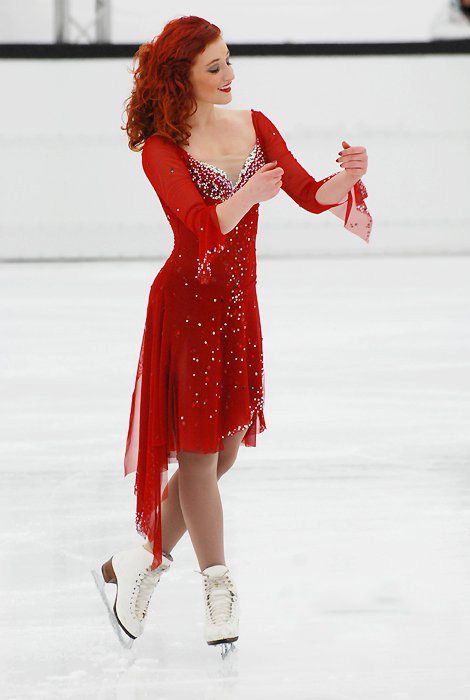
- Brooke Frieling during the 2011 European Championships in Bern, Switzerland.

Personal information
- Native name: ברוק פרילינג
- Born: November 10, 1986 (age 39) Boston, Massachusetts, U.S.
- Height: 5 ft 3 in (1.61 m)

Figure skating career
- Country: Israel
- Partner: Lionel Rumi
- Coach: Natalia Linichuk; Gennadi Karponosov; Uschi Keszler
- Skating club: Ice Works Skating in Aston

Brooke Frieling (Hebrew: ברוק פרילינג; born November 10, 1986) is an American ice dancer who competed for Israel with partner Lionel Rumi.

== Career ==
Early in her career, Frieling skated with Buck Withrow for the United States at the Skating Club of Boston. She later trained for a year at the senior level in San Diego, California.

In early 2008, Frieling moved to Philadelphia to be coached by Natalia Linichuk and Gennadi Karponosov. She teamed up with Lionel Rumi to compete for Israel. They placed 20th at the 2011 European Championships and 24th at the 2011 World Championships.

== Personal life ==
Frieling is taking a part-time course load at the University of Pennsylvania.

== Competitive highlights ==
=== With Withrow ===
Event	2005
U.S. Championships	11th N.

=== With Rumi ===
Event	2009–10	2010–11
World Championships	S	24th
European Championships	S	20th
Ondrej Nepela Memorial	9th	9th
Golden Spin of Zagreb	8th	12th
S = Substitute

== Personal bests ==
International Best Score	with Lionel Rumi
Personal Best Total Score	99.63 European Championships 2011
Personal Best Score Short Dance	44.43 World Championships 2011
Personal Best Score Free Dance	57.94 European Championships 2011

== Music ==
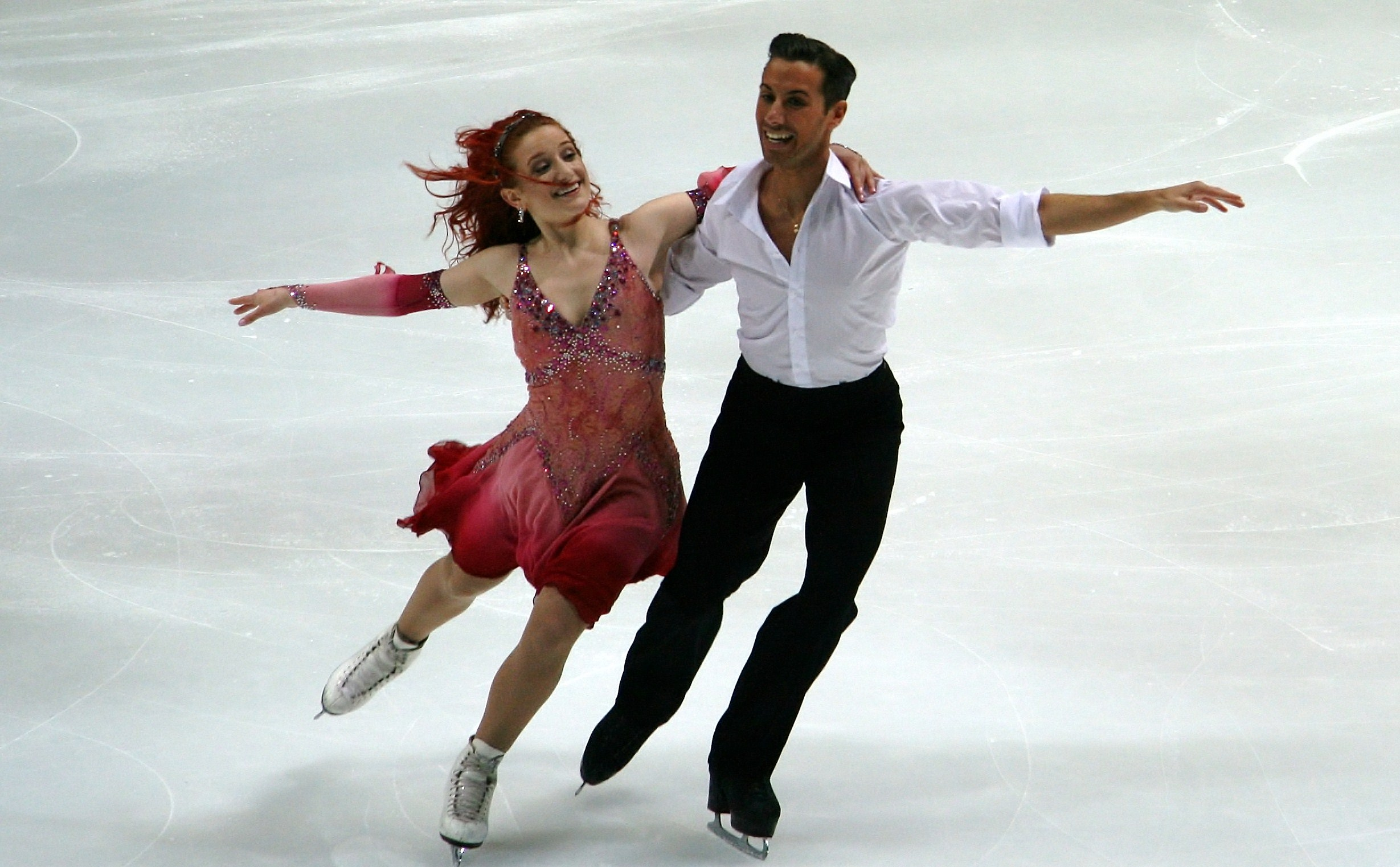
Frieling and Rumi at the 2011 World Championships

Season	Short dance	Free dance
2010–2011	Padam Padam (Composer: Norbert Glanzberg); I love Paris (Composer: Cole Porter, Performer: Frank Sinatra)	Nine (2009 live-action film) OST (music from Maury Yeston); Finale; Unusual Way (by Griffith Frank); Be Italian (by Fergie (singer))
Season	Original dance	Free dance
2009–2010	Hava Naguila (Jewish Folk)	Escape (Craig Armstrong)
2007–2008	Les deux guitares (Tzigane Folk)	Medley Latino; The Cup of life (Ricky Martin); El beso del final (Christina Aguilera); Let's get loud (Jennifer Lopez)
2006–2007	Criminal, Paris, Texas; Gotan Project (Tango)	The Last Samourai OST; A way of life – Idyll's end / Spectres in the fog / Red warriors
2005–2006	Rapunzel, Caminemos, Rapunzel (Merengue/Rumba/Merenge)	Medley Starmania; Ouverture / The World is Stone / A Little Damage Done
