= Lionel Rumi =

French-Israeli ice dancer and model (born 1986)

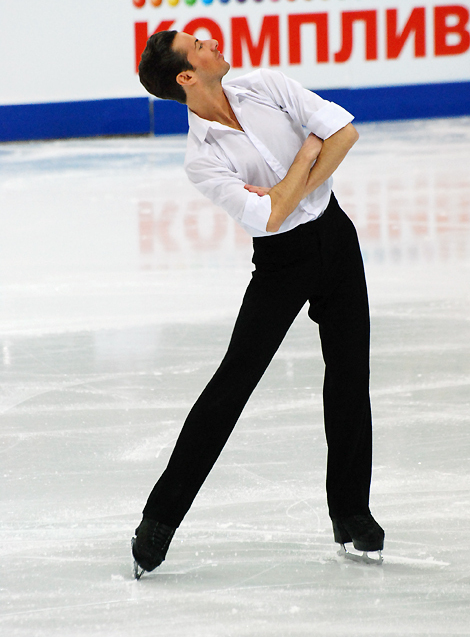
- Lionel Rumi during the short dance at the 2011 European Championships in Bern, Switzerland.

Personal information
- Native name: ליונל רומי
- Full name: Lionel Rumi
- Born: August 12, 1986 (age 40) Lyon, France
- Height: 1.70 m (5 ft 7 in)

Figure skating career
- Country: Israel
- Partner: Brooke Frieling
- Coach: Natalia Linichuk; Gennadi Karponosov; Uschi Keszler
- Skating club: Ice Works Skating in Aston

Lionel Rumi (Hebrew: ליונל רומי; born August 12, 1986) is a French-Israeli ice dancer and model. He skated for France with Élodie Brouiller and Scarlett Rouzet until 2008 and then began representing Israel with Brooke Frieling.

== Personal life ==
Rumi was born in Lyon, in Rhône-Alpes, France. He immigrated to Israel in 2008.

== Career ==
Rumi initially skated for France. His partners from 1999 to 2007 were Lætitia Fenet, Élodie Brouiller, and Scarlett Rouzet. He competed in ISU Junior Grand Prix events from 2003 through 2007 and the European Youth Olympic Games in 2003. He twice won the French national novice title and the junior title at the Master's de Patinage. He and Scarlett Rouzet were substitutes for the 2008 European Championships.

In 2008, Rumi teamed up with Brooke Frieling to compete for Israel. They placed 20th at the 2011 European Championships and 24th at the 2011 World Championships.

== Competitive highlights ==
- Élodie Brouiller (2002–2005)
- Scarlett Rouzet (2005–2008)
- Brooke Frieling (2009–2011)

Event	2002–03	2003–04	2004–05	2005–06	2006–07	2007–08	2008–09	2009–10	2010–11
World Championships								S	24th
European Championships						S		S	20th
World Junior Championships		S	S	S	S	S			
French Championships						4th			
French Junior Championships		2nd	2nd	3rd	3rd	4th			
French Novice Championships	1st	1st							
Swiss Junior Championships		1st							
Ondrej Nepela Memorial								9th	9th
Golden Spin of Zagreb								8th	12th
European Youth Olympic Festival	6th J.								
Masters of France		3rd J.	2nd J.	1st J.	3rd J.	1st J.			
Junior Grand Prix of Mexico		6th							
Junior Grand Prix of Bled		9th							
Junior Grand Prix of Courchevel			6th		13th				
Junior Grand Prix of Kyiv			8th						
Junior Grand Prix of Montréal				7th					
Junior Grand Prix of Zagreb				4th					
Junior Grand Prix of The Hague					11th				
Junior Grand Prix of Lake Placid						WD			
Junior Grand Prix of Sofia						6th			
Junior Grand Prix of Sheffield						9th			
Legend: All competitions are senior-level unless otherwise noted. J = Junior-level; WD = Withdrew; S = Substitute

== Personal bests ==
International Best Score	with Scarlett Rouzet	with Brooke Frieling
Personal Best Total Score	132.17 ISU JGP Sofia Cup 2007	121.34 42nd Golden Spin of Zagreb 2009
Personal Best Score Compulsory Dance	27.57 ISU JGP Sofia Cup 2007	23.95 17th Ondrej Nepela Memorial 2009
Personal Best Score Original Dance	43.16 ISU JGP Sofia Cup 2007	37.32 42nd Golden Spin of Zagreb 2009
Personal Best Score Free Dance	62.29 ISU J. Curry Memorial 2007	64.48 Skate Wilmington 2010

International Best Score	with Brooke Frieling
Personal Best Total Score	99.63 European Championships 2011
Personal Best Score Short Dance	44,43 World Championships 2011
Personal Best Score Free Dance	57.94 European Championships 2011

== Music ==
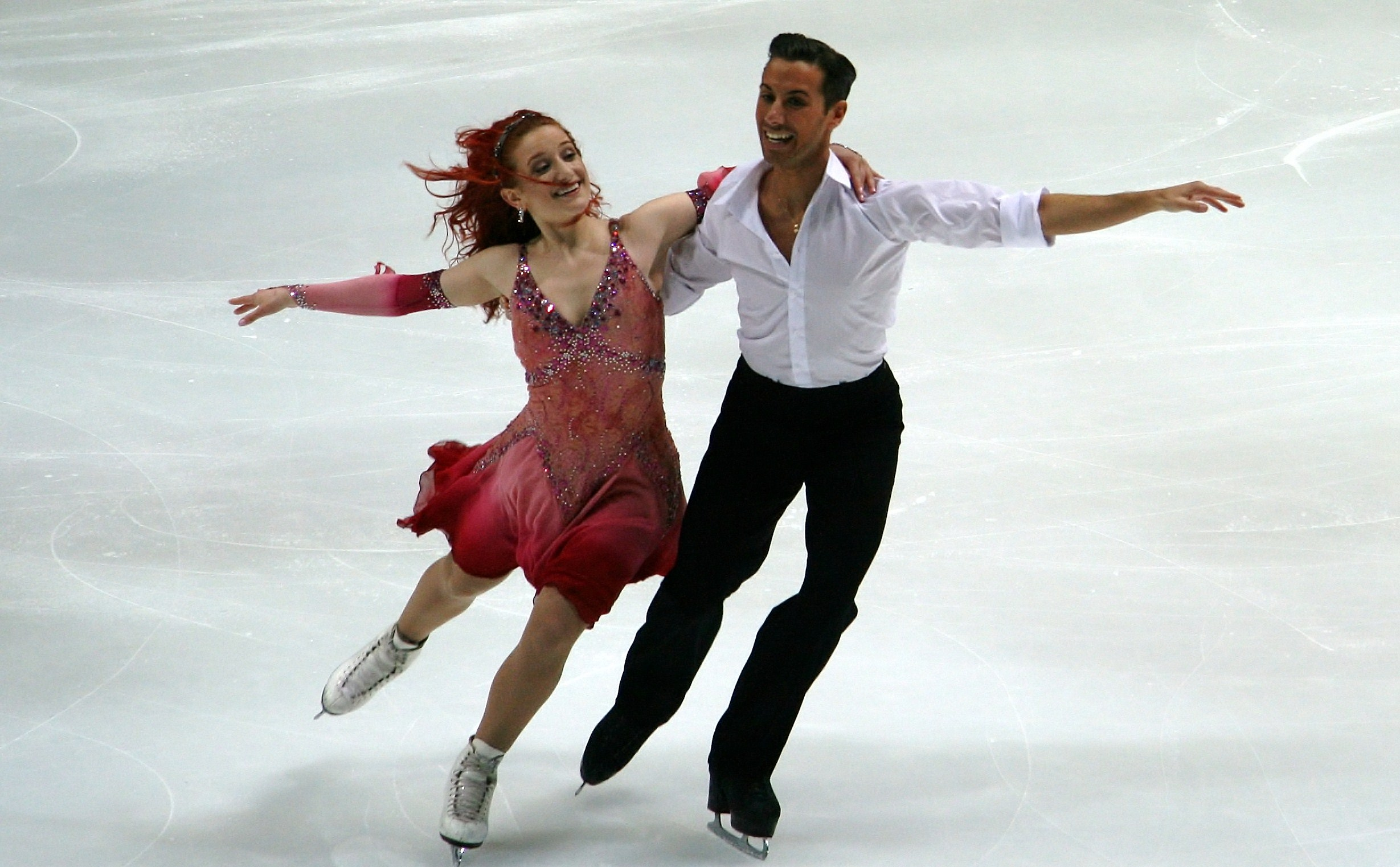
Frieling and Rumi at the 2011 World Championships

Season	Short dance	Free dance
2010–2011	Padam Padam (composer: Norbert Glanzberg); I love Paris (composer: Cole Porter, Performer: Frank Sinatra)	Nine (2009 live-action film) OST (music from Maury Yeston); Finale; Unusual Way (by Griffith Frank); Be Italian (by Fergie (singer))
	Original dance	
2009–2010	Hava Naguila (Jewish Folk)	Escape (Craig Armstrong)
2007–2008	Les deux guitares (Tzigane Folk)	Medley Latino; The Cup of life (Ricky Martin); El beso del final (Christina Aguilera); Let's get loud (Jennifer Lopez)
2006–2007	Criminal, Paris, Texas; Gotan Project (Tango)	The Last Samourai OST; A way of life – Idyll's end / Spectres in the fog / Red warriors
2005–2006	Rapunzel, Caminemos, Rapunzel (Merengue/Rumba/Merenge)	Medley Starmania; Ouverture / The World is Stone / A Little Damage Done
