= 2011–12 ISU Grand Prix of Figure Skating =

- Type: Grand Prix
- Date: 21 October – 11 December 2011
- Season: 2011–12
- Previous: 2010–11 Grand Prix
- Next: 2012–13 Grand Prix

The 2011–12 ISU Grand Prix of Figure Skating was a series of senior international figure skating competitions in the 2011–12 season. Skaters competed in the disciplines of men's singles, ladies singles, pair skating, and ice dancing at six invitational competitions in the fall of 2011. Skaters earned points based on their placement at each event and the skaters who finished in the top six in each discipline qualified to compete at the Grand Prix Final, held in Quebec City, Canada.

The Grand Prix series set the stage for the 2012 European, Four Continents, and World Championships, as well as each country's national championships. The Grand Prix series began on 21 October 2011 and ended on 11 December 2011.

The Grand Prix was organized by the International Skating Union. Skaters competed for prize money and for a chance to compete in the Grand Prix Final. The corresponding series for junior-level skaters was the 2011–12 ISU Junior Grand Prix.

== Schedule ==
Date	Event	Location	Details
21–23 October	2011 Skate America	Ontario, United States	
28–30 October	2011 Skate Canada International	Mississauga, Canada	
4–6 November	2011 Cup of China	Shanghai, China	
11–13 November	2011 NHK Trophy	Sapporo, Japan	
18–20 November	2011 Trophée Éric Bompard	Paris, France	
25–27 November	2011 Cup of Russia	Moscow, Russia	
8–11 December	2011–12 Grand Prix Final	Quebec City, Canada	

== Changes ==
The maximum number of entries at each event was reduced from twelve to ten in singles and from ten to eight in ice dancing. This reduced by twelve the number of available spots in each discipline. The number of spots for pairs had already been reduced to eight and remained at that level.

The number of possible events was increased to three for the top six in each discipline at the 2011 World Championships. This had been allowed in the early years of the Grand Prix series but reduced to two later. If all of the skaters accepted, it would reduce by six the number of available spots for other skaters, which combined with the reduction of entries, would result in 18 fewer spots available to other skaters in each discipline, compared to the previous season. The top six were offered a US$10,000 bonus to compete at three events but face a fine if they later withdraw, even for valid medical reasons. About 29% of the 24 skaters/teams opted for three events.

A minimum score requirement was introduced to the Grand Prix series for the first time.

== General requirements ==
Skaters who reach the age of 14 by 1 July 2011 were eligible to compete on the senior Grand Prix circuit.

Minimum score requirements were added to the Grand Prix series and were set at three-fifths of the top scores at the 2011 World Championships. Prior to competing in a Grand Prix event, skaters were required to earn the following scores:

Discipline	Minimum
Men	168.60
Ladies	117.48
Pairs	130.71
Ice dance	111.15
Skaters who had not earned the minimums in the previous season could attempt to do so at: 2011 Nebelhorn Trophy; 2011 Ondrej Nepela Memorial; 2011 Finlandia Trophy; 2011 Coupe de Nice; 2011 Ice Challenge; 2011 NRW Ice Dance Trophy.

The International Skating Union decided that the minimums do not apply to "host picks", i.e. Canadians Adriana DeSanctis and Elladj Balde were allowed to compete at their home country's event, 2011 Skate Canada International, despite failing to reach the minimums at the 2011 Nebelhorn Trophy.

== Assignments ==
The top six skaters/teams from the 2011 World Championships were seeded and assigned to two events. They also had the option of competing at a third event, receiving a US$10,000 bonus if they chose to do so, with their best two results counting toward qualifying for the Grand Prix Final. There were no substitutions of the seeded positions.

Skaters who placed 7–12 at 2011 Worlds were guaranteed two assignments. The remaining spots could be given to skaters who placed in the top 24 on the season's best score or world ranking lists. However, these skaters were not guaranteed any events, even if they had a higher Season's Best score than skaters in the top 12 at Worlds but did not compete at the event due to the three-per-country restriction.

The host country was allowed to assign three skaters/teams of their choosing from their country in each discipline.

Skaters who missed one or more seasons but had placed in the top six at any previous World Championships had the option of getting assignments to the Grand Prix under the "Come-back skaters" clause. They were obliged to commit to two events and could take advantage of this clause only once.

The following skaters have received assignments for one or more Grand Prix events:

=== Men ===
Skater	Assignment(s)
Jeremy Abbott	Cup of China, Cup of Russia
Florent Amodio	Skate America, Trophée Éric Bompard
Elladj Balde	Skate Canada International
Michal Březina	Skate America, Trophée Éric Bompard, Cup of Russia
Patrick Chan	Skate Canada International, Trophée Éric Bompard
Samuel Contesti	Skate America, NHK Trophy
Richard Dornbush	Skate America, Cup of China
Javier Fernandez	Skate Canada International, Cup of Russia
Artur Gachinski	Cup of China, Cup of Russia
Yuzuru Hanyu	Cup of China, Cup of Russia
Brian Joubert	Trophée Éric Bompard
Takahiko Kozuka	Skate America, NHK Trophy
Tatsuki Machida	NHK Trophy
Armin Mahbanoozadeh	Skate America, NHK Trophy
Alexander Majorov	Skate Canada International, Trophée Éric Bompard
Konstantin Menshov	NHK Trophy, Cup of Russia
Ross Miner	Skate Canada International, NHK Trophy
Brandon Mroz	NHK Trophy, Cup of Russia
Daisuke Murakami	Skate America
Nobunari Oda	Cup of China, Trophée Éric Bompard
Alban Preaubert	Skate Canada International
Douglas Razzano	Skate America
Kevin Reynolds	Cup of China, Trophée Éric Bompard
Adam Rippon	Skate Canada International, Trophée Éric Bompard
Andrei Rogozine	Skate Canada International, Cup of Russia
Song Nan	Cup of China, Trophée Éric Bompard
Daisuke Takahashi	Skate Canada International, NHK Trophy
Denis Ten	Skate America, Skate Canada International
Kevin van der Perren	Skate America
Tomáš Verner	NHK Trophy, Cup of Russia
Sergei Voronov	Cup of Russia
Jialiang Wu	Cup of China

=== Ladies ===
Skater	Assignment(s)
Mao Asada	NHK Trophy, Cup of Russia
Sofia Biryukova	Cup of Russia
Alissa Czisny	Skate America, Trophée Éric Bompard
Adriana DeSanctis	Skate Canada International
Rachael Flatt	Skate Canada International, Cup of Russia
Joelle Forte	Skate America
Christina Gao	Cup of China, Cup of Russia
Elene Gedevanishvili	Skate America, NHK Trophy
Bingwa Geng	Cup of China
Sarah Hecken	Skate Canada International
Joshi Helgesson	Skate America
Viktoria Helgesson	Trophée Éric Bompard
Haruka Imai	Skate America, Cup of Russia
Shoko Ishikawa	NHK Trophy
Kiira Korpi	NHK Trophy, Cup of Russia
Carolina Kostner	Skate America, Cup of China, Trophée Éric Bompard
Amelie Lacoste	Skate Canada International, Cup of Russia
Sonia Lafuente	Trophée Éric Bompard
Alena Leonova	Skate Canada International, NHK Trophy, Cup of Russia
Ksenia Makarova	Skate America, Cup of China
Valentina Marchei	Skate America, Cup of China
Léna Marrocco	Trophée Éric Bompard
Maé-Bérénice Méité	NHK Trophy, Trophée Éric Bompard
Kanako Murakami	Cup of China, Trophée Éric Bompard
Mirai Nagasu	Skate Canada International, Cup of China
Cynthia Phaneuf	Skate Canada International, NHK Trophy
Yretha Silete	Trophée Éric Bompard
Adelina Sotnikova	Cup of China, Cup of Russia
Akiko Suzuki	Skate Canada International, NHK Trophy
Elizaveta Tuktamysheva	Skate Canada International, Trophée Éric Bompard
Ashley Wagner	Skate Canada International, NHK Trophy
Agnes Zawadzki	NHK Trophy, Cup of Russia
Caroline Zhang	Skate America
Zhang Kexin	Cup of China
Zhu Qiuying	Cup of China

=== Pairs ===
Pair	Assignment(s)
Vera Bazarova / Yuri Larionov	Skate America, Trophée Éric Bompard
Stefania Berton / Ondrej Hotarek	NHK Trophy, Cup of Russia
Ashley Cain / Joshua Reagan	Cup of Russia
Adeline Canac / Yannick Bonheur	Trophée Éric Bompard
Marissa Castelli / Simon Shnapir	NHK Trophy
Caydee Denney / John Coughlin	Skate America, NHK Trophy
Huibo Dong / Yiming Wu	Trophée Éric Bompard
Jessica Dubé / Sébastien Wolfe	Skate Canada International, Trophée Éric Bompard
Meagan Duhamel / Eric Radford	Skate Canada International, Trophée Éric Bompard
Amanda Evora / Mark Ladwig	Cup of China, Trophée Éric Bompard
Katarina Gerboldt / Alexander Enbert	Cup of Russia
Maylin Hausch / Daniel Wende	Skate America, Cup of Russia
Lubov Iliushechkina / Nodari Maisuradze	Skate Canada International, NHK Trophy
Vanessa James / Morgan Cipres	Trophée Éric Bompard
Brittany Jones / Kurtis Gaskell	Cup of Russia
Klara Kadlecova / Petr Bidar	Cup of China
Yuko Kavaguti / Alexander Smirnov	Cup of China, NHK Trophy, Cup of Russia
Paige Lawrence / Rudi Swiegers	Skate Canada International
Mary Beth Marley / Rockne Brubaker	Skate America
Kirsten Moore-Towers / Dylan Moscovitch	Skate America, Cup of China
Natasha Purich / Raymond Schultz	NHK Trophy
Aliona Savchenko / Robin Szolkowy	Skate America, NHK Trophy, Cup of Russia
Taylor Steele / Robert Schultz	Cup of China
Ksenia Stolbova / Fedor Klimov	Trophée Éric Bompard, Cup of Russia
Wenjing Sui / Cong Han	Skate Canada International, Cup of China
Narumi Takahashi / Mervin Tran	Skate Canada International, NHK Trophy
Tiffany Vise / Don Baldwin	Skate America
Tatiana Volosozhar / Maxim Trankov	Skate Canada International, Trophée Éric Bompard
Xiaoyu Yu / Yang Jin	Skate Canada International, Cup of China
Dan Zhang / Hao Zhang	Skate America, Cup of China

=== Ice dance ===
Team	Assignment(s)
Lorenza Alessandrini / Simone Vaturi	NHK Trophy
Ekaterina Bobrova / Dmitri Soloviev	Cup of China, Cup of Russia
Isabella Cannuscio / Ian Lorello	Skate America
Anna Cappellini / Luca Lanotte	Skate Canada International, Trophée Éric Bompard
Pernelle Carron / Lloyd Jones	Cup of China, Cup of Russia
Madison Chock / Evan Bates	Skate Canada International, Trophée Éric Bompard
Penny Coomes / Nicholas Buckland	Cup of China
Meryl Davis / Charlie White	Skate America, Cup of Russia
Kristina Gorshkova / Vitali Butikov	Trophée Éric Bompard
Tarrah Harvey / Keith Gagnon	Skate Canada International
Xintong Huang / Xun Zheng	Cup of China, Trophée Éric Bompard
Madison Hubbell / Zachary Donohue	Skate America
Sara Hurtado / Adria Diaz	Trophée Éric Bompard
Elena Ilinykh / Nikita Katsalapov	NHK Trophy, Trophée Éric Bompard
Lynn Kriengkrairut / Logan Giulietti-Schmitt	NHK Trophy
Charlotte Lichtman / Dean Copely	Cup of China
Alexandra Paul / Mitchell Islam	Skate America, NHK Trophy
Nathalie Pechalat / Fabian Bourzat	Skate America, Skate Canada International, Trophée Éric Bompard
Ekaterina Pushkash / Jonathan Guerreiro	Skate Canada International, Cup of Russia
Kharis Ralph / Asher Hill	Skate America
Cathy Reed / Chris Reed	NHK Trophy, Cup of Russia
Ekaterina Riazanova / Ilia Tkachenko	Skate Canada International, Cup of Russia
Emily Samuelson / Todd Gilles	Cup of China
Maia Shibutani / Alex Shibutani	Cup of China, NHK Trophy
Isabella Tobias / Deividas Stagniunas	Skate America, Cup of Russia
Tessa Virtue / Scott Moir	Skate Canada International, Trophée Éric Bompard
Kaitlyn Weaver / Andrew Poje	Skate Canada International, NHK Trophy, Cup of Russia
Xiaoyang Yu / Chen Wang	Cup of China
Nelli Zhiganshina / Alexander Gazsi	Skate America, NHK Trophy

=== Replacements ===
A list of alternates was used to call up replacements, in the following order:

1. Come-back skaters
2. Skaters from split teams which had placed in the top 12 at a previous World Championships
3. Skaters from the top 24 on the season's best (SB) list
4. Skaters from the top 24 SB who have only one event
5. All other skaters in the top 75 SB
6. Winners of selected international competitions (Nebelhorn, Ondrej Nepela, Finlandia, Coupe de Nice, Ice Challenge, NRW Ice Dance Trophy)

Skaters from split teams which placed in the top 12 at the 2010 or 2011 World Championships and earned the minimum score in that period were not required to earn a new minimum with the new partner.

== Medal summary ==
Event	Discipline	Gold	Silver	Bronze
Skate America	Men	(Czech Republic) Michal Březina	(Belgium) Kevin van der Perren	(Japan) Takahiko Kozuka
Skate America	Ladies	(United States) Alissa Czisny	(Italy) Carolina Kostner	(Sweden) Viktoria Helgesson
Skate America	Pairs	(Germany) Aliona Savchenko / Robin Szolkowy	(China) Dan Zhang / Hao Zhang	(Canada) Kirsten Moore-Towers / Dylan Moscovitch
Skate America	Ice dancing	(United States) Meryl Davis / Charlie White	(France) Nathalie Péchalat / Fabian Bourzat	(Lithuania) Isabella Tobias / Deividas Stagniūnas

Event	Discipline	Gold	Silver	Bronze
Skate Canada	Men	(Canada) Patrick Chan	(Spain) Javier Fernández	(Japan) Daisuke Takahashi
Skate Canada	Ladies	(Russia) Elizaveta Tuktamysheva	(Japan) Akiko Suzuki	(United States) Ashley Wagner
Skate Canada	Pairs	(Russia) Tatiana Volosozhar / Maxim Trankov	(China) Wenjing Sui / Cong Han	(Canada) Meagan Duhamel / Eric Radford
Skate Canada	Ice dancing	(Canada) Tessa Virtue / Scott Moir	(Canada) Kaitlyn Weaver / Andrew Poje	(Italy) Anna Cappellini / Luca Lanotte

Event	Discipline	Gold	Silver	Bronze
Cup of China	Men	(United States) Jeremy Abbott	(Japan) Nobunari Oda	(China) Song Nan
Cup of China	Ladies	(Italy) Carolina Kostner	(United States) Mirai Nagasu	(Russia) Adelina Sotnikova
Cup of China	Pairs	(Russia) Yuko Kavaguti / Alexander Smirnov	(China) Dan Zhang / Hao Zhang	(Canada) Kirsten Moore-Towers / Dylan Moscovitch
Cup of China	Ice dancing	(Russia) Ekaterina Bobrova / Dmitri Soloviev	(United States) Maia Shibutani / Alex Shibutani	(France) Pernelle Carron / Lloyd Jones

Event	Discipline	Gold	Silver	Bronze
NHK Trophy	Men	(Japan) Daisuke Takahashi	(Japan) Takahiko Kozuka	(United States) Ross Miner
NHK Trophy	Ladies	(Japan) Akiko Suzuki	(Japan) Mao Asada	(Russia) Alena Leonova
NHK Trophy	Pairs	(Russia) Yuko Kavaguti / Alexander Smirnov	(Japan) Narumi Takahashi / Mervin Tran	(Germany) Aliona Savchenko / Robin Szolkowy
NHK Trophy	Ice dancing	(United States) Maia Shibutani / Alex Shibutani	(Canada) Kaitlyn Weaver / Andrew Poje	(Russia) Elena Ilinykh / Nikita Katsalapov

Event	Discipline	Gold	Silver	Bronze
Trophée Eric Bompard	Men	(Canada) Patrick Chan	(China) Song Nan	(Czech Republic) Michal Březina
Trophée Eric Bompard	Ladies	(Russia) Elizaveta Tuktamysheva	(Italy) Carolina Kostner	(United States) Alissa Czisny
Trophée Eric Bompard	Pairs	(Russia) Tatiana Volosozhar / Maxim Trankov	(Russia) Vera Bazarova / Yuri Larionov	(Canada) Meagan Duhamel / Eric Radford
Trophée Eric Bompard	Ice dancing	(Canada) Tessa Virtue / Scott Moir	(France) Nathalie Péchalat / Fabian Bourzat	(Italy) Anna Cappellini / Luca Lanotte

Event	Discipline	Gold	Silver	Bronze
Rostelecom Cup	Men	(Japan) Yuzuru Hanyu	(Spain) Javier Fernández	(United States) Jeremy Abbott
Rostelecom Cup	Ladies	(Japan) Mao Asada	(Russia) Alena Leonova	(Russia) Adelina Sotnikova
Rostelecom Cup	Pairs	(Germany) Aliona Savchenko / Robin Szolkowy	(Russia) Yuko Kavaguti / Alexander Smirnov	(Italy) Stefania Berton / Ondřej Hotárek
Rostelecom Cup	Ice dancing	(United States) Meryl Davis / Charlie White	(Canada) Kaitlyn Weaver / Andrew Poje	(Russia) Ekaterina Bobrova / Dmitri Soloviev

Event	Discipline	Gold	Silver	Bronze
Grand Prix Final	Men	(Canada) Patrick Chan	(Japan) Daisuke Takahashi	(Spain) Javier Fernández
Grand Prix Final	Ladies	(Italy) Carolina Kostner	(Japan) Akiko Suzuki	(Russia) Alena Leonova
Grand Prix Final	Pairs	(Germany) Aliona Savchenko / Robin Szolkowy	(Russia) Tatiana Volosozhar / Maxim Trankov	(Russia) Yuko Kavaguti / Alexander Smirnov
Grand Prix Final	Ice dancing	(United States) Meryl Davis / Charlie White	(Canada) Tessa Virtue / Scott Moir	(France) Nathalie Péchalat / Fabian Bourzat

== Top Grand Prix scores ==
Skaters ranked according to total score. The short and free columns break down the total score of a skater's best overall event into the short program and free skating.

=== Men ===
Top senior Grand Prix scores after six events: Skate America, Skate Canada International, Cup of China, NHK Trophy, Trophée Eric Bompard, Rostelecom Cup, and Grand Prix Final.

Rank	Name	Country	Total	Short	Free	Event	Date
1	Patrick Chan	Canada	260.30	86.63	173.67	Grand Prix Final	2011-12-10
2	Daisuke Takahashi	Japan	259.75	90.43	169.32	NHK Trophy	2011-11-13
3	Javier Fernández	Spain	250.33	84.71	165.62	Skate Canada	2011-10-29
4	Yuzuru Hanyu	Japan	245.82	79.33	166.49	Grand Prix Final	2011-12-10
5	Jeremy Abbott	United States	238.82	82.66	156.16	Grand Prix Final	2011-12-10
6	Takahiko Kozuka	Japan	235.02	79.77	155.25	NHK Trophy	2011-11-13
7	Nobunari Oda	Japan	227.11	77.65	149.46	Cup of China	2011-11-05
8	Song Nan	China	226.75	72.72	154.03	Cup of China	2011-11-05
9	Michal Březina	Czech Republic	226.35	79.01	147.34	Rostelecom Cup	2011-11-26
10	Artur Gachinski	Russia	222.54	81.64	140.90	Cup of China	2011-11-05

=== Ladies ===
Top senior Grand Prix scores after six events: Skate America, Skate Canada International, Cup of China, NHK Trophy, Trophée Eric Bompard, Rostelecom Cup, and Grand Prix Final.

Rank	Name	Country	Total	Short	Free	Event	Date
1	Carolina Kostner	Italy	187.48	66.43	121.05	Grand Prix Final	2011-12-10
2	Akiko Suzuki	Japan	185.98	66.55	119.43	NHK Trophy	2011-11-12
3	Mao Asada	Japan	184.19	58.42	125.77	NHK Trophy	2011-11-12
4	Elizaveta Tuktamysheva	Russia	182.89	62.04	120.85	Trophée Bompard	2011-11-19
5	Alena Leonova	Russia	180.45	63.91	116.54	Rostelecom Cup	2011-11-26
6	Alissa Czisny	United States	179.15	57.25	121.90	Trophée Bompard	2011-11-19
7	Mirai Nagasu	United States	173.22	60.96	112.26	Cup of China	2011-11-05
8	Adelina Sotnikova	Russia	169.75	57.79	111.96	Rostelecom Cup	2011-11-26
9	Sofia Biryukova	Russia	166.07	56.30	109.77	Rostelecom Cup	2011-11-26
10	Ashley Wagner	United States	165.65	55.88	109.77	NHK Trophy	2011-11-12

=== Pairs ===
Top senior Grand Prix scores after six events: Skate America, Skate Canada International, Cup of China, NHK Trophy, Trophée Eric Bompard, Rostelecom Cup, and Grand Prix Final.

Rank	Name	Country	Total	Short	Free	Event	Date
1	Aliona Savchenko / Robin Szolkowy	Germany	212.26	69.82	142.44	Grand Prix Final	2011-12-10
2	Tatiana Volosozhar / Maxim Trankov	Russia	212.08	71.57	140.51	Grand Prix Final	2011-12-10
3	Yuko Kavaguti / Alexander Smirnov	Russia	197.84	65.17	132.67	Rostelecom Cup	2011-11-26
4	Vera Bazarova / Yuri Larionov	Russia	184.91	59.06	125.85	Trophée Bompard	2011-11-19
5	Zhang Dan / Zhang Hao	China	182.54	63.43	119.11	Grand Prix Final	2011-12-10
6	Wenjing Sui / Cong Han	China	180.82	59.23	121.59	Skate Canada	2011-10-29
7	Kirsten Moore-Towers / Dylan Moscovitch	Canada	177.43	59.60	117.83	Skate America	2011-10-23
8	Meagan Duhamel / Eric Radford	Canada	176.62	61.06	115.56	Trophée Bompard	2011-11-19
9	Caydee Denney / John Coughlin	United States	175.40	59.62	115.78	Skate America	2011-10-23
10	Narumi Takahashi / Mervin Tran	Japan	172.09	57.89	114.20	NHK Trophy	2011-11-12

=== Ice dancing ===
Top senior Grand Prix scores after six events: Skate America, Skate Canada International, Cup of China, NHK Trophy, Trophée Eric Bompard, Rostelecom Cup, and Grand Prix Final.

Rank	Name	Country	Total	Short	Free	Event	Date
1	Meryl Davis / Charlie White	United States	188.55	76.17	112.38	Grand Prix Final	2011-12-11
2	Tessa Virtue / Scott Moir	Canada	183.84	71.01	112.83	Grand Prix Final	2011-12-11
3	Nathalie Péchalat / Fabian Bourzat	France	169.69	68.68	101.01	Grand Prix Final	2011-12-11
4	Kaitlyn Weaver / Andrew Poje	Canada	166.07	66.24	99.83	Grand Prix Final	2011-12-11
5	Ekaterina Bobrova / Dmitri Soloviev	Russia	163.52	65.73	97.79	Cup of China	2011-11-05
6	Maia Shibutani / Alex Shibutani	United States	160.55	65.53	95.02	Grand Prix Final	2011-12-11
6	Anna Cappellini / Luca Lanotte	Italy	154.87	61.92	92.95	Skate Canada	2011-10-30
8	Elena Ilinykh / Nikita Katsalapov	Russia	149.48	61.83	87.65	NHK Trophy	2011-11-12
9	Nelli Zhiganshina / Alexander Gazsi	Germany	136.12	55.69	80.43	NHK Trophy	2011-11-12
10	Madison Chock / Evan Bates	United States	135.10	51.24	84.67	Skate Canada	2011-10-30

== Prize money and Grand Prix Final qualification points ==
The top finishers earned prize money, as well as points toward qualifying for the Grand Prix Final, according to the chart below.

Placement	Points	Prize money: Pre-final event	Prize money: GP Final
1st	15	US$18,000	$25,000
2nd	13	US$13,000	$18,000
3rd	11	US$9,000	$12,000
4th	9	US$3,000	$6,000
5th	7	US$2,000	$4,000
6th	5	-	$3,000
7th	4*	-	-
8th	3*	-	-
The sign * denotes not applicable to pairs and ice dancing. Pairs and ice dancers split the sum. GP total: US$180,000; GP Final total: US$272,000.

After the last event, the 2011 Cup of Russia, the six skaters/teams with the most points advanced to the Grand Prix Final. If a skater or team competed at three events, their two best results counted toward the standings. There were seven tie-breakers:

1. Highest placement at an event. If a skater placed 1st and 3rd, the tiebreaker was the 1st place, and that beats a skater who placed 2nd in both events.
2. Highest combined total scores in both events. If a skater earned 200 points at one event and 250 at a second, that skater would win in the second tie-break over a skater who earned 200 points at one event and 150 at another.
3. Participated in two events.
4. Highest combined scores in the free skating/free dancing portion of both events.
5. Highest individual score in the free skating/free dancing portion from one event.
6. Highest combined scores in the short program/original dance of both events.
7. Highest number of total participants at the events.

If a tie remained, it was considered unbreakable and the tied skaters all qualified for the Grand Prix Final.

=== Qualification standings ===
Bold denotes Grand Prix Final qualification.

Points	Men	Ladies	Pairs	Ice dance
30	(Canada) **Patrick Chan**	(Russia) **Elizaveta Tuktamysheva**	(Russia) **Tatiana Volosozhar / Maxim Trankov** (Germany) **Aliona Savchenko / Robin Szolkowy** (Russia) **Yuko Kavaguti / Alexander Smirnov**	(United States) **Meryl Davis / Charlie White** (Canada) **Tessa Virtue / Scott Moir**
28		(Japan) **Mao Asada** (Italy) **Carolina Kostner** (Japan) **Akiko Suzuki**		(United States) **Maia Shibutani / Alex Shibutani**
26	(Japan) **Daisuke Takahashi** (United States) **Jeremy Abbott** (Czech Republic) **Michal Březina** (Spain) **Javier Fernández**	(United States) **Alissa Czisny**	(China) **Zhang Dan / Zhang Hao**	(Russia) **Ekaterina Bobrova / Dmitri Soloviev** (France) **Nathalie Pechalat / Fabian Bourzat** (Canada) **Kaitlyn Weaver / Andrew Poje**
24	(Japan) **Yuzuru Hanyu** (China) Song Nan (Japan) Takahiko Kozuka	(Russia) **Alena Leonova**		
22		(Russia) Adelina Sotnikova	(Japan) **Narumi Takahashi / Mervin Tran** (Canada) **Meagan Duhamel / Eric Radford** (Canada) Kirsten Moore-Towers / Dylan Moscovitch	(Italy) Anna Cappellini / Luca Lanotte
20		(United States) Mirai Nagasu (United States) Ashley Wagner	(Russia) Vera Bazarova / Yuri Larionov (China) Sui Wenjing / Han Cong (Italy) Stefania Berton / Ondrej Hotarek	(Russia) Elena Ilinykh / Nikita Katsalapov
19				
18	(United States) Adam Rippon	(Sweden) Viktoria Helgesson	(United States) Amanda Evora / Mark Ladwig	(Lithuania) Isabella Tobias / Deividas Stagniūnas (Germany) Nelli Zhiganshina / Alexander Gazsi
17	(Japan) Nobunari Oda			
16	(Belgium) Kevin van der Perren (United States) Ross Miner		(United States) Caydee Denney / John Coughlin	(France) Pernelle Carron / Lloyd Jones (United States) Madison Chock / Evan Bates (Russia) Ekaterina Riazanova / Ilia Tkachenko
15				
14	(United States) Richard Dornbush (Russia) Artur Gachinski (Kazakhstan) Denis Ten	(Japan) Kanako Murakami (Japan) Haruka Imai		
13				
12	(Italy) Samuel Contesti	(Finland) Kiira Korpi	(Russia) Lubov Iliushechkina / Nodari Maisuradze (Canada) Jessica Dubé / Sébastien Wolfe	(China) Huang Xintong / Zheng Xun
11		(Georgia (country)) Elene Gedevanishvili (Russia) Ksenia Makarova		
10				
9	(Canada) Andrei Rogozine	(Russia) Sofia Biryukova (China) Zhang Kexin (France) Maé-Bérénice Méité	(Russia) Ksenia Stolbova / Fedor Klimov	(United Kingdom) Penny Coomes / Nicholas Buckland
8	(Russia) Konstantin Menshov	(Canada) Amelie Lacoste		
7	(France) Florent Amodio (Czech Republic) Tomáš Verner	(United States) Christina Gao (United States) Agnes Zawadzki	(Russia) Katarina Gerboldt / Alexander Enbert	(Italy) Lorenza Alessandrini / Simone Vaturi (Canada) Kharis Ralph / Asher Hill
6				
5	(Sweden) Alexander Majorov (Japan) Daisuke Murakami	(United States) Caroline Zhang	(China) Yu Xiaoyu / Jin Yang (United States) Tiffany Vise / Don Baldwin (China) Dong Huibo / Wu Yiming (United States) Ashley Cain / Joshua Reagan	(Russia) Ekaterina Pushkash / Jonathan Guerreiro (United States) Madison Hubbell / Zachary Donohue (United States) Lynn Kriengkrairut/ Logan Giulietti-Schmitt (China) Yu Xiaoyang / Wang Chen
4	(Canada) Kevin Reynolds (Russia) Sergei Voronov (Japan) Tatsuki Machida (United States) Douglas Razzano	(Canada) Cynthia Phaneuf (Spain) Sonia Lafuente		
3	(United States) Armin Mahbanoozadeh (China) Wu Jialiang (France) Romain Ponsart	(China) Geng Bingwa (United States) Joelle Forte (France) Yretha Silete (Germany) Sarah Hecken		

== Medal standings ==
Rank	Nation	Gold	Silver	Bronze	Total
1	Russia (RUS)	7	4	7	18
2	United States (USA)	6	2	4	12
3	Canada (CAN)	5	4	4	13
4	Japan (JPN)	4	7	2	13
5	Germany (GER)	3	0	1	4
6	Italy (ITA)	2	2	3	7
7	Czech Republic (CZE)	1	0	1	2
8	China (CHN)	0	4	1	5
9	France (FRA)	0	2	2	4
10	Spain (ESP)	0	2	1	3
11	Belgium (BEL)	0	1	0	1
12	Lithuania (LTU)	0	0	1	1
12	Sweden (SWE)	0	0	1	1
Totals (13 entries)		28	28	28	84
