= 2011 NHK Trophy =

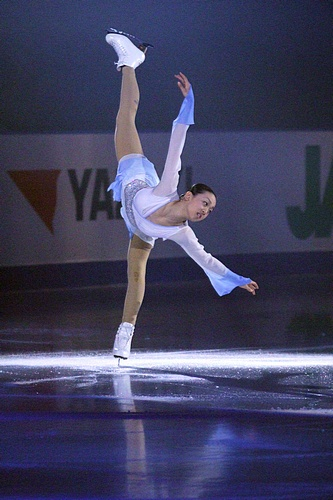
- Type: Grand Prix
- Date: November 10 – 13
- Season: 2011–12
- Location: Sapporo
- Host: Japan Skating Federation
- Venue: Makomanai Sekisui Heim Ice Arena

Champions
- Men's singles: (Japan) Daisuke Takahashi
- Ladies' singles: (Japan) Akiko Suzuki
- Pairs: (Russia) Yuko Kavaguti / Alexander Smirnov
- Ice dance: (United States) Maia Shibutani / Alex Shibutani
- Previous: 2010 NHK Trophy
- Next: 2012 NHK Trophy
- Previous Grand Prix: 2011 Cup of China
- Next Grand Prix: 2011 Trophée Éric Bompard

The 2011 NHK Trophy was the fourth event of six in the 2011–12 ISU Grand Prix of Figure Skating, a senior-level international invitational competition series. It was held at the Makomanai Sekisui Heim Ice Arena in Sapporo from November 10–13. Medals were awarded in the disciplines of men's singles, ladies' singles, pair skating, and ice dancing. Skaters earned points toward qualifying for the 2011–12 Grand Prix Final.

== Eligibility ==
Skaters who reached the age of 14 by July 1, 2011 were eligible to compete on the senior Grand Prix circuit.

In July 2011, minimum score requirements were added to the Grand Prix series and were set at two-thirds of the top scores at the 2011 World Championships. Prior to competing in a Grand Prix event, skaters were required to earn the following:

Discipline	Minimum
Men	168.60
Ladies	117.48
Pairs	130.71
Ice dancing	111.15

== Entries ==
The entries were as follows.

Country	Men	Ladies	Pairs	Ice dancing
Canada		Cynthia Phaneuf	Natasha Purich / Raymond Schultz	Alexandra Paul / Mitchell Islam; Kaitlyn Weaver / Andrew Poje
Czech Republic	Tomáš Verner			
Finland		Kiira Korpi		
France		Maé Bérénice Méité		
Georgia		Elene Gedevanishvili		
Germany			Aliona Savchenko / Robin Szolkowy	Nelli Zhiganshina / Alexander Gazsi
Italy	Samuel Contesti		Stefania Berton / Ondřej Hotárek	Lorenza Alessandrini / Simone Vaturi
Japan	Takahiko Kozuka; Daisuke Takahashi; Tatsuki Machida	Mao Asada; Akiko Suzuki; Shoko Ishikawa	Narumi Takahashi / Mervin Tran	Cathy Reed / Chris Reed
Russia	Konstantin Menshov	Alena Leonova	Lubov Iliushechkina / Nodari Maisuradze; Yuko Kavaguti / Alexander Smirnov	Elena Ilinykh / Nikita Katsalapov
United States	Armin Mahbanoozadeh; Ross Miner; Brandon Mroz	Ashley Wagner; Agnes Zawadzki	Marissa Castelli / Simon Shnapir; Caydee Denney / John Coughlin	Lynn Kriengkrairut / Logan Giulietti-Schmitt; Maia Shibutani / Alex Shibutani

== Schedule ==
(Local time, GMT +09:00):

- Thursday, November 10
  - 07:00–17:30 – Official practices
- Friday, November 11
  - 09:00–14:10 – Official practices
  - 14:55–16:00 – Short dance
  - 16:45–17:53 – Pairs' short
  - 19:15–20:33 – Ladies' short
- Saturday, November 12
  - 06:30–11:10 – Official practices
  - 12:00–13:14 – Free dance
  - 14:05–15:26 – Pairs' free
  - 15:30–16:00 – Medal ceremonies
  - 16:30–17:51 – Men's short
  - 19:00–20:33 – Ladies' free
  - 20:45–21:05 – Medal ceremony
- Sunday, November 13
  - 08:00–12:00 – Official practices
  - 12:55–14:35 – Men's free
  - 14:45–15:00 – Medal ceremony
  - 15:50–18:00 – Gala/Exhibitions

== Results ==
=== Men ===
On November 12, Brandon Mroz of the United States became the first skater to land the quad lutz in an international competition when he landed it in the short program at NHK. Japan's Daisuke Takahashi won the short program by 10.66 points over Takahiko Kozuka. Takahashi fell on an under-rotated quad flip in the free skating. He stated, "For the first time in my life, I could nail a quad flip in the six-minute warm-up. But in the real competition I overstrained myself in landing and crashed. It still feels great now that I know how I could do it." Mroz attempted a quad lutz in the free but under-rotated and fell. A screw in Menshov's boot became damaged just before he skated his free skating.

Rank	Name	Nation	Total points	SP		FS	
1	Daisuke Takahashi	Japan	259.75	1	90.43	1	169.32
2	Takahiko Kozuka	Japan	235.02	2	79.77	2	155.25
3	Ross Miner	United States	212.36	6	71.12	4	141.24
4	Samuel Contesti	Italy	209.69	7	63.83	3	145.86
5	Tomáš Verner	Czech Republic	196.63	9	62.96	5	133.67
6	Konstantin Menshov	Russia	195.88	4	74.67	8	121.21
7	Tatsuki Machida	Japan	195.45	5	72.26	6	123.19
8	Armin Mahbanoozadeh	United States	185.58	8	63.52	7	122.06
9	Brandon Mroz	United States	184.83	3	74.83	9	110.00

=== Ladies ===
Japan's Akiko Suzuki won the short program while Mao Asada was first in the free skating. Suzuki took the gold medal, Asada the silver, and Alena Leonova the bronze.

Rank	Name	Nation	Total points	SP		FS	
1	Akiko Suzuki	Japan	185.98	1	66.55	2	119.43
2	Mao Asada	Japan	184.19	3	58.42	1	125.77
3	Alena Leonova	Russia	170.68	2	61.76	4	108.92
4	Ashley Wagner	United States	165.65	5	55.88	3	109.77
5	Elene Gedevanishvili	Georgia	160.44	4	57.37	6	103.07
6	Kiira Korpi	Finland	157.53	7	53.70	5	103.83
7	Maé Bérénice Méité	France	143.69	8	52.05	7	91.64
8	Agnes Zawadzki	United States	138.19	6	53.84	9	84.35
9	Cynthia Phaneuf	Canada	131.82	9	45.42	8	86.40
10	Shoko Ishikawa	Japan	122.14	10	45.07	10	77.07

=== Pairs ===
Having first attempted a rare throw triple axel at 2011 Skate America, Germany's Aliona Savchenko and Robin Szolkowy again attempted the element at NHK but again took a hard fall. They recovered to win the short program. Russia's Yuko Kavaguti and Alexander Smirnov pulled up from fifth in the short to take the gold medal, while Takahashi and Tran won silver and Savchenko and Szolkowy the bronze.

Rank	Name	Nation	Total points	SP		FS	
1	Yuko Kavaguti / Alexander Smirnov	Russia	177.51	5	55.02	1	122.49
2	Narumi Takahashi / Mervin Tran	Japan	172.09	2	57.89	2	114.20
3	Aliona Savchenko / Robin Szolkowy	Germany	171.68	1	59.23	3	112.45
4	Stefania Berton / Ondřej Hotárek	Italy	163.83	3	56.23	5	107.60
5	Caydee Denney / John Coughlin	United States	163.75	4	55.48	4	108.27
6	Lubov Iliushechkina / Nodari Maisuradze	Russia	159.01	6	53.12	6	105.89
7	Marissa Castelli / Simon Shnapir	United States	149.02	7	49.93	7	99.09
8	Natasha Purich / Raymond Schultz	Canada	128.17	8	45.56	8	82.61

=== Ice dancing ===
Russia's Elena Ilinykh and Nikita Katsalapov placed first in the short dance, followed by Canada's Kaitlyn Weaver and Andrew Poje in second and Maia and Alex Shibutani of the United States in third. There were several accidents before the free dance. Canada's Alexandra Paul and Mitchell Islam withdrew after Paul suffered a cut to the back of the thigh in a collision with Italy's Lorenza Alessandrini and Simone Vaturi during the morning practice on November 12. There was also a collision in the warm-up just before the free dance involving Lynn Kriengkrairut and Logan Giulietti-Schmitt of the United States and Cathy Reed and Chris Reed of Japan; Chris Reed injured his right leg but both teams were able to compete in the free dance. Elena Ilinykh injured her knee when she crashed into the boards in the warm-up before the free dance; she and her partner finished the competition, winning the bronze, but withdrew from the exhibitions. The Shibutanis took the gold, edging out by 0.09 points Weaver and Poje, who had a one point deduction due to a lift held too long.

Rank	Name	Nation	Total points	SD		FD	
1	Maia Shibutani / Alex Shibutani	United States	151.85	3	59.02	1	92.83
2	Kaitlyn Weaver / Andrew Poje	Canada	151.76	2	60.07	2	91.69
3	Elena Ilinykh / Nikita Katsalapov	Russia	149.48	1	61.83	3	87.65
4	Nelli Zhiganshina / Alexander Gazsi	Germany	136.12	4	55.69	4	80.43
5	Lorenza Alessandrini / Simone Vaturi	Italy	133.29	5	54.37	5	78.92
6	Lynn Kriengkrairut / Logan Giulietti-Schmitt	United States	126.39	6	50.81	6	75.58
7	Cathy Reed / Chris Reed	Japan	123.22	8	49.36	7	73.86
WD	Alexandra Paul / Mitchell Islam	Canada		7	49.36		
