= Brandon Mroz =

American figure skater (born 1990)

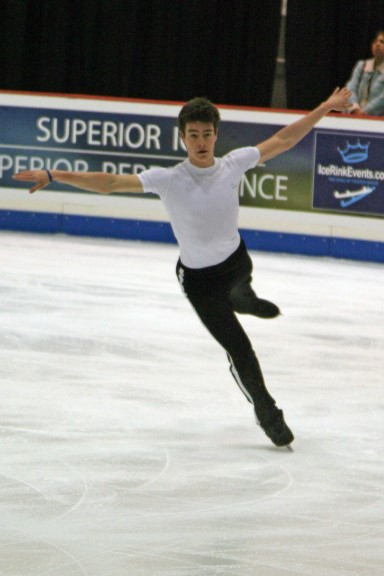
- Mroz at the 2009 World Championships

Personal information
- Born: December 22, 1990 (age 35) St. Louis, Missouri, U.S.
- Home town: Colorado Springs, Colorado, U.S.
- Height: 5 ft 10 in (1.78 m)

Figure skating career
- Country: United States
- Discipline: Men's singles
- Began skating: 1994
- Retired: 2014
U.S. Championships
Silver medal – second place	2009 Cleveland	Singles
Junior Grand Prix Final
Silver medal – second place	2006–07 Sofia	Singles
Silver medal – second place	2007–08 Gdańsk	Singles

Brandon Mroz (born December 22, 1990) is an American former competitive figure skater. He is the 2009 U.S. silver medalist and the 2006 & 2007 Junior Grand Prix Final silver medalist. He is the first skater to have completed a quadruple Lutz in a sanctioned competition.

== Early life ==
Brandon Mroz was born in St. Louis, Missouri, one of four brothers. Mroz's mother was at one time a synchronized skater and his father an ice hockey player.

== Career ==
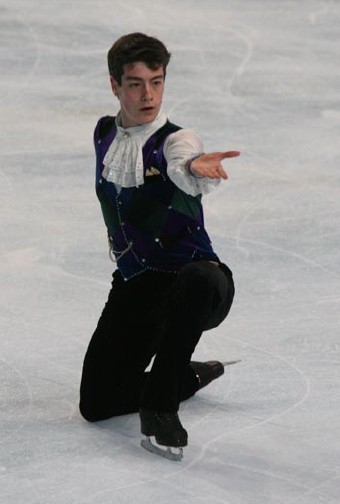
Mroz during his free skate at the 2008 Trophée Eric Bompard

=== Early career ===
Mroz began skating at age 3. He was coached by Shannon Nester and Debbie Howe from 2001 through 2004 and by Doug Leigh and Michelle Leigh in Barrie, Ontario, from 2002 through 2004. In addition to singles skating, he also trained as an ice dancer and tested in that discipline up to silver level in the U.S. Figure Skating testing structure.

In the 2001–02 season, Mroz competed on the juvenile level, the lowest competitive level in the United States. He represented the St. Louis Skating Club in competition. He won his regional competition, the Upper Great Lakes Regional Championship, to qualify at the juvenile level for the 2002 U.S. Junior Championships, where he placed 6th in his qualifying group and went on to place 18th overall.

In the 2002–03 season, Mroz moved up to the intermediate level. He won both the short program and the free skate at his regional competition to win the gold medal overall. By this win he qualified to compete at the intermediate level at the 2003 U.S. Junior Championships, where he placed second in his qualifying group, 16th in the short program, and 7th in the free skate to place 11th overall.

In the 2003–04 season, Mroz moved up to the novice level. At the regional championship, the first qualifying competition for the U.S. Figure Skating Championships, Mroz won the short program and the free skate to win the gold medal overall. This win qualified him for the 2004 Midwestern Sectional Championships, the second and final qualifying competition for the national championships. At Sectionals, Mroz placed fourth in the short program and second in the free skate to win the silver medal overall. With this medal he qualified for the 2004 U.S. Championships at the novice level. At Nationals, Mroz placed 7th in the short program and the free skate to place 7th overall. Following the event, Mroz competed at the 2004 Copenhagen Trophy, where he won the novice men's competition after winning both segments.

In the 2004–05 season, Mroz remained on the novice level. At his regional championships, he placed second in the short program and in the free skate to win the silver medal overall. This medal qualified him for the Midwestern Sectional Championships where he placed 8th in the short program and 5th in the free skate to place 6th overall. Due to this placement, he did not qualify for the 2005 U.S. Championships.

In 2005, Mroz moved to Colorado Springs, Colorado, where he joined Tom Zakrajsek. In the 2005–06 season, he remained on the novice level for a third and final season. Competing at the Southwestern Regional Championship, Mroz won the short program and the free skate to win the gold medal overall. This win qualified him for the 2006 Midwestern Sectionals where Mroz competed for the first time under the ISU Judging System. He won the short program and placed second in the free skate to win the gold medal overall. This win qualified him, again, for the 2006 U.S. Championships.

At the 2006 U.S. Championships, Mroz won the short program by a point margin of 1.48. He placed third in the free skate, and won the silver medal overall. In his free skate, Mroz landed all the triples except for the Axel, including a triple Lutz-triple toe loop combination.

=== Junior career ===
Mroz was assigned to the 2006 Triglav Trophy. Competing on the junior level for the first time in his career, Mroz won both the short and free programs to win the gold medal.

In the 2006–07 season, Mroz moved up to the Junior level on the national level, and he debuted on the ISU Junior Grand Prix circuit. At his first Junior Grand Prix event, the event in Mexico City, Mexico, Mroz placed 11th in the short program and then won the free skate to take the silver medal overall. At Mroz's second event, the Junior Grand Prix event in Taipei City, Taiwan, Mroz won the short program and placed second in the free skate to win the gold medal overall.

These two medals qualified Mroz for the Junior Grand Prix Final. By qualifying for the event, Mroz also earned a bye to the national championships and so did not need to compete at qualifying events. At the JGP Final, Mroz placed 5th in the short program and 2nd in the free skate. He won the silver medal overall.

Mroz then competed at the 2007 U.S. Championships. Mroz placed second in the short program and third in the free skate. He won the silver medal overall.

Mroz was subsequently placed on the team for the 2007 World Junior Championships, where he placed 7th in the short program and 2nd in the free skate to place 4th overall.

In the 2007–08 season, Mroz remained on the Junior level both nationally and internationally. He competed for the second consecutive season on the Junior Grand Prix. At his first event, the 2007–08 ISU Junior Grand Prix event in Vienna, Austria, he placed fourth in the short program and won the free skate to win the gold medal overall. At his second event in Chemnitz, Germany, he again placed 4th in the short program and won the free skate to win the gold medal overall.

These two medals qualified Mroz for the Junior Grand Prix Final, for which he was the highest-ranked qualifier. At the JGP Final, Mroz placed second in both segments of the competition to win the silver medal overall.

By qualifying for the JGP Final, Mroz received a bye to the 2008 U.S. Championships. At Nationals, Mroz competed for the second time on the junior level. He placed 3rd in the short program and 2nd in the free skate to win the silver medal overall. He was subsequently placed on the team to the 2008 World Junior Championships, where he placed 3rd in the short program after landing a triple Axel-triple toe loop combination. He placed 5th in the free skate to place 4th overall.

=== Senior career ===
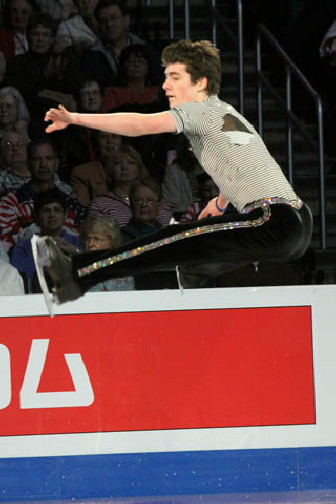
Mroz performs a split jump during his Jailhouse Rock exhibition at the 2009 World Championships

In the 2008–09 season, Mroz moved up to the senior level both nationally and internationally. He debuted on the Grand Prix circuit. At his first event, the 2008 Skate Canada International, he placed 6th in the short program and 7th in the free skate to place 7th overall. During his free skate, he was credited with a quad toe loop. Mroz went on to compete at the 2008 Trophée Eric Bompard, his second Grand Prix event. He placed 6th in the short program and 5th in the free skate to place 5th overall.

Due to the timing of his Grand Prix events, Mroz had a bye to the 2009 U.S. Championships. At Nationals, Mroz placed 4th in the short program after being credited with landing a triple Axel and a triple Lutz-triple toe loop. He placed 2nd in the free skate, in which he was credited with landing a quad toe loop and eight triples, including a triple Lutz-triple toe loop combination. He won the silver medal overall.

Following the national championships, Mroz was assigned to the 2009 Four Continents Championships and the 2009 World Championships. At Four Continents, Mroz placed 5th in the short program after landing a triple Axel, a triple flip, and a triple Lutz-triple toe loopcombination. In the free skate, Mroz placed 9th after landing a 4T, but making errors on several other jumps, including his 3A. He placed 8th overall.

In his debut at the senior World Championships, Mroz skated a strong short program to place 8th in that segment of the competition. He placed 13th in the free skate to finish 9th overall. His placement, combined with that of World Champion Evan Lysacek, earned the United States the maximum three entries to the 2010 Winter Olympics.

Mroz won his first senior Grand Prix medal, silver, at the 2010 Cup of China. He followed it up with a bronze medal at the 2010 Trophée Eric Bompard. Competing with a dislocated shoulder, he placed 7th at the 2011 U.S. Championships.

In August 2011, Mroz began working on other quads. He landed a quad Lutz successfully on September 16, 2011, in the short program at the 2011 Colorado Springs Invitational. The International Skating Union subsequently ratified the jump as the first successful quad Lutz landed in a sanctioned competition. His assigned 2011–12 Grand Prix events are 2011 NHK Trophy and 2011 Cup of Russia. Mroz became the first skater to land the quad Lutz in an international competition on November 12 in the short program at the NHK Trophy.

After ending his competitive career, Mroz began skating in Willy Bietak's ice shows on Royal Caribbean cruise ships.

== Programs ==
Season	Short program	Free skating	Exhibition
2011–12	Mack the Knife by Kurt Weill choreo. by Jeffrey Buttle	Carmen by Georges Bizet arranged by Leonard Bernstein choreo. by Jeffrey Buttle	
2010–11	The Barber of Seville by Gioachino Rossini	On the Waterfront by Leonard Bernstein	Greased Lightnin' (from Grease)
2009–10	Temptation by Tito Puente; Cherry Pink and Apple Blossom White by Pérez Prado; Mambo Jambo by Terry Snyder	Symphony no. 5 by Ludwig van Beethoven performed by the Vienna Philharmonic; Romance in F Major by Ludwig van Beethoven performed by the Orpheus Chamber Orchestra	Greased Lightnin' (from Grease)
2008–09	Till Eulenspiegel's Merry Pranks by Richard Strauss	Toccata and Fugue in D minor, BWV 565; Prelude from Cello Suite No. 1 by Johann Sebastian Bach	Jailhouse Rock by Elvis Presley
2007–08	Night on Bald Mountain by Modest Mussorgsky choreo. by Kurt Browning	King of the Forest by Edvin Marton choreo. Tom Dickson	
2006–07	Improviso by Nino Rota	Malagueña by Ernesto Lecuona version by Stan Kenton	Jailhouse Rock by Elvis Presley
2005–06	Montoona Clipper	The Incredibles by Michael Giacchino	

== Competitive highlights ==
- GP – Event of the ISU Grand Prix Series
- JGP – Event of the ISU Junior Grand Prix Series

Competition placements at senior level
Season	2008–09	2009–10	2010–11	2011–12	2012–13	2013–14
World Championships	9th					
Four Continents Championships	8th	4th				
U.S. Championships	2nd	6th	7th	14th	9th	9th
GP Cup of China			2nd			
GP Cup of Russia		7th		9th		
GP France	5th		3rd			
GP NHK Trophy				9th		
GP Skate America		8th				
GP Skate Canada	7th					

Competition placements at junior level
Season	2005–06	2006–07	2007–08
World Junior Championships		4th	4th
Junior Grand Prix Final		2nd	2nd
U.S. Championships		2nd	2nd
JGP Austria			1st
JGP Germany			1st
JGP Mexico		2nd	
JGP Taiwan		1st	
Triglav Trophy	1st		

== Detailed results ==
ISU personal best scores in the +3/-3 GOE System
Segment	Type	Score	Event
Total	TSS	216.80	2010 Cup of China
Short program	TSS	76.10	2009 World Championships
Short program	TES	43.60	2009 Four Continents Championships
Short program	PCS	34.07	2011 NHK Trophy
Free skating	TSS	146.96	2010 Cup of China
Free skating	TES	78.98	2010 Cup of China
Free skating	PCS	67.98	2010 Cup of China
