= Mervin Tran =

Canadian pair skater

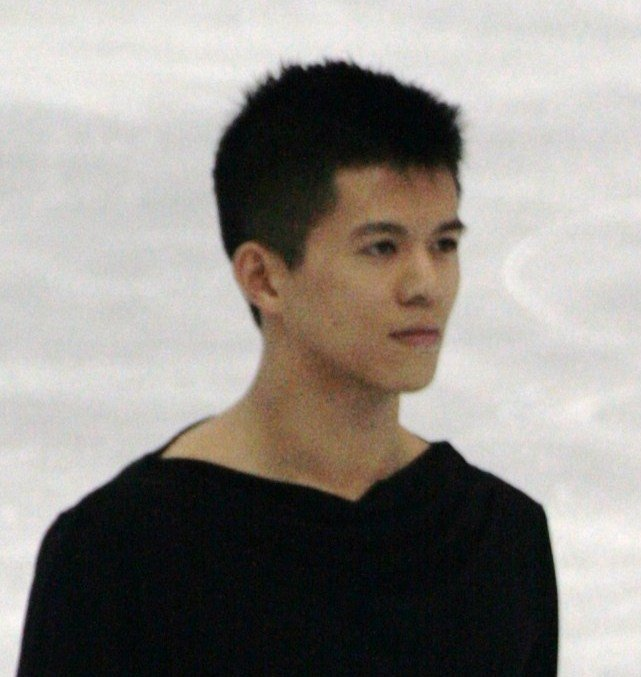
- Tran at the 2012 World Championships

Personal information
- Born: September 22, 1990 (age 36) Regina, Saskatchewan, Canada
- Height: 1.75 m (5 ft 9 in)

Figure skating career
- Country: United States; Japan; Canada
- Coach: Bruno Marcotte, Richard Gauthier, Sylvie Fullum, Bobby Martin
- Skating club: CAP St. Leonard
- Began skating: 1994

Medal record
Event	Gold medal – first place	Silver medal – second place	Bronze medal – third place
World Championships	0	0	1
Japanese Championships	4	0	0
U.S. Championships	0	1	1
World Team Trophy	1	0	1
World Junior Championships	0	1	1
Junior Grand Prix Final	1	1	0
Medal list
representing Japan
World Championships
Bronze medal – third place	2012 Nice	Pairs
Japanese Championships
Gold medal – first place	2008–09 Nagano	Pairs
Gold medal – first place	2009–10 Osaka	Pairs
Gold medal – first place	2010–11 Nagano	Pairs
Gold medal – first place	2011–12 Osaka	Pairs
World Team Trophy
Gold medal – first place	2012 Tokyo	Team
Bronze medal – third place	2009 Tokyo	Team
World Junior Championships
Silver medal – second place	2010 The Hague	Pairs
Bronze medal – third place	2011 Gangneung	Pairs
Junior Grand Prix Final
Gold medal – first place	2010–11 Beijing	Pairs
Silver medal – second place	2009–10 Tokyo	Pairs
Medal list
representing United States
U.S. Championships
Silver medal – second place	2017 Kansas City	Pairs
Bronze medal – third place	2016 Saint Paul	Pairs

Mervin Tran (born September 22, 1990) is a retired Canadian pair skater.

Competing for Japan with former partner Narumi Takahashi, he is the 2012 World bronze medalist, the 2010 World Junior silver medalist, the 2010 JGP Final champion, and 2008–10 Japanese national champion. They were the first pair to win a World medal for Japan. After their partnership ended, Tran competed one season with Natasha Purich for Canada. Competing for the United States with Marissa Castelli, he is the 2017 U.S. national silver medalist. Following Castelli's retirement, he briefly competed with Olivia Serafini for the United States. As of 2022, Mervin coaches in the New York area.

== Personal life ==
Tran was born in Regina, Saskatchewan. He moved to Montreal, Quebec in 2007 to train with Richard Gauthier. His parents were refugees from Vietnam and Cambodia. He competed at the provincial track and field championships in the high jump and the 100-meter hurdles, finishing fifth in the hurdles.

== Early career ==
Mervin Tran began skating at age four after his parents enrolled him in a hockey camp but then moved into figure skating after he took CanSkate. He was originally a single skater and placed 9th on the novice level at the 2007 Canadian Championships.

== Partnership with Takahashi ==
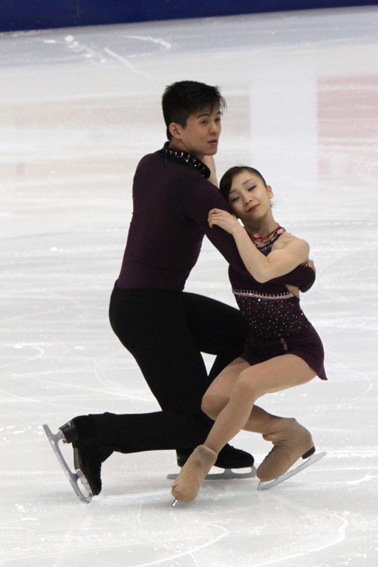
Takahashi/Tran in 2011

In 2007, Richard Gauthier was searching for a pair skating partner for Japanese skater Narumi Takahashi. Bruno Marcotte recommended Mervin Tran, who agreed to come to Montreal, Quebec for a tryout. Takahashi/Tran began training together in July 2007. During their career together, they trained in St. Leonard and received funding from the Japanese skating association.

=== 2007–2008 season ===
Takahashi/Tran made their international debut on the 2007–08 ISU Junior Grand Prix series, placing 12th and 6th at their events. They won the Japan Junior Championships and earned a trip to 2008 Junior Worlds, where they placed 15th.

=== 2008–2009 season ===
Takahashi/Tran placed 4th at their first Junior Grand Prix event. They won the bronze medal at their second event, qualifying them for the 2008-2009 ISU Junior Grand Prix Final, where they placed 7th. They won the senior title at the 2008–09 Japanese Championships. At the 2009 Junior Worlds, they placed 7th.

=== 2009–2010 season ===
Takahashi/Tran began their season on the Junior Grand Prix circuit. They won the bronze medal at their first event and gold at their second event, which qualified them for the 2009–10 JGP Final. They also debuted on the senior Grand Prix series with an 8th-place finish at NHK Trophy. They won silver at the JGP Final and at the Junior World Championships. They became the second pair representing Japan to medal at an ISU Championships (Yuko Kavaguti / Alexander Markuntsov were the first pair when they won silver in 2001).

=== 2010–2011 season ===
During the 2010–11 season, Takahashi/Tran won silver medals at their JGP events and qualified for the JGP Final. They won gold at the event, becoming the first pair representing Japan to win the title. They also won their first medals on the senior Grand Prix series, a bronze at 2010 NHK Trophy, and then silver at 2010 Cup of Russia. As a result, they were first alternates for the senior Grand Prix Final. They won the bronze medal at the 2011 Junior Worlds. They also made their senior World Championships debut, finishing 9th.

=== 2011–2012 season ===
During the 2011–2012 season, Takahashi/Tran placed fourth at their first Grand Prix assignment, the 2011 Skate Canada International, and then won the silver medal at their second event, 2011 NHK Trophy. In November 2011, Tran said he was considering pursuing Japanese citizenship in order to allow the couple to compete at the Olympics but said it was a difficult decision because it would mean giving up his Canadian citizenship. They became the first Japanese pair to qualify for the senior Grand Prix Final.

At the 2012 World Championships, Takahashi/Tran placed third in both programs and won the bronze medal. They became the first pair to medal for Japan at a senior World Championships. They placed third at the 2012 World Team Trophy. In April 2012, Tran said he would continue to consider an application for Japanese citizenship and the president of the Japanese Olympic Committee said he was "willing to make a special request (on behalf of Tran) to the government if necessary." In May 2012, a government official said it would be difficult to naturalize Tran because he had never resided in Japan.

=== 2012–2013 season ===
In April 2012, Takahashi dislocated her left shoulder while practicing a lift. After five or six recurrences, she decided to undergo surgery on October 30. As a result, the pair withdrew from their Grand Prix events, the 2012 Cup of China and 2012 NHK Trophy. They said they would miss about four to six months. On December 18, 2012, the Japanese Skating Federation announced that the pair had ended their partnership.

== Partnership with Purich ==
On March 12, 2013, Tran announced he had teamed up with Natasha Purich to compete for Canada. They debuted at the 2013 Nebelhorn Trophy and placed sixth. The pair finished fourth at the 2014 Canadian Championships.

== Partnership with Castelli ==
On June 10, 2014, it was announced that Tran and the United States' Marissa Castelli had formed a partnership which would train mainly in Montreal under Bruno Marcotte and to a lesser extent at the Skating Club of Boston under Bobby Martin. It was also announced that he was awaiting release from Skate Canada, indicating that they might compete for the United States.

=== 2016–2017 season ===
Tran sustained a concussion in August 2016. After winning bronze at the 2016 CS Autumn Classic International, the pair appeared at two Grand Prix events, placing 7th at the 2016 Skate America and 5th at the 2016 Trophée de France. Castelli accidentally struck Tran with her elbow during training in late December.

=== 2017–2018 season ===
Tran and Castelli placed sixth at the 2018 U.S. Figure Skating Championships. They ended their partnership soon after and Tran went to California to try out with other partners.

== Partnership with Serafini ==
=== 2018–2019 season ===
Tran formed a partnership with Olivia Serafini in 2018. Debuting at the 2019 U.S. Championships, they placed thirteenth.

=== 2019–2020 season ===
Serafini/Tran made their international debut at the 2019 CS Finlandia Trophy, where they placed fifth. Competing a second Challenger event, they were seventh at the 2019 CS Golden Spin of Zagreb, and finished the season with a seventh-place finish at the 2020 U.S. Championships.

=== 2020–2021 season ===
Due to the COVID-19 pandemic affecting international travel, Serafini/Train were assigned to the 2020 Skate America, attended only by pairs training in the United States. They finished sixth. They went on to finish sixth as well at the 2021 U.S. Championships. That was the team's final season together.

== Programs ==
=== With Serafini ===
Season	Short program	Free skating	Exhibition
2020–2021	If I Ain't Got You by Alicia Keys	Chasing Cars by Snow Patrol choreo. by Julie Marcotte	
2019–2020	Better Than Yourself by Lukas Graham; Moonlight Sonata by Ludwig van Beethoven choreo. by Julie Marcotte	Chasing Cars by Snow Patrol choreo. by Julie Marcotte	
2018–2019	Give Me One Reason by Tracy Chapman choreo. by Julie Marcotte	Chasing Cars by Snow Patrol choreo. by Julie Marcotte	

=== With Castelli ===
Season	Short program	Free skating	Exhibition
2017–2018	Fallin' by Alicia Keys choreo. by Julie Marcotte	Woman by Shawn Phillips	Groove Is in the Heart by Deee-Lite
2016–2017	Fallin' by Alicia Keys choreo. by Julie Marcotte	Journey medley: Don't Stop Believin'; Open Arms; Any Way You Want It choreo. by Julie Marcotte	Groove Is in the Heart by Deee-Lite
2015–2016	Summertime by George Gershwin choreo. by Julie Marcotte	Journey medley: Don't Stop Believin'; Open Arms; Any Way You Want It choreo. by Julie Marcotte	Try by Pink
2014–2015	Summertime by George Gershwin choreo. by Julie Marcotte	Adiós Nonino by Astor Piazzolla choreo. by Julie Marcotte	Try by Pink

=== With Purich ===
Season	Short program	Free skating
2013–2014	Tiny Dancer by Elton John	Life Is Beautiful by Nicola Piovani; Buon Giorno Principessa; Grand Hotel Valse; Valse Larmoyante

=== With Takahashi ===
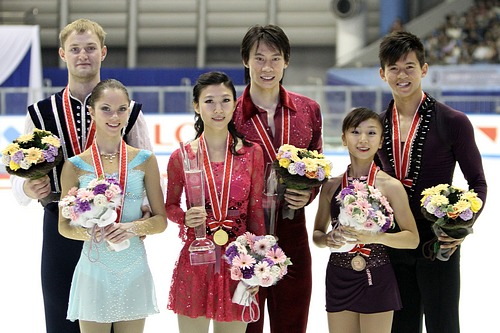
Takahashi/Tran won their first senior Grand Prix medal at 2010 NHK Trophy

Season	Short program	Free skating	Exhibition
2012–2013	Ain't No Sunshine by Bill Withers	Gigi; Main Title; You Never Told Me; Gigi's Big Moment; Gaston's Decision	Runaway Baby by Bruno Mars
2011–2012	Imagine by John Lennon choreo. by Julie Marcotte	Concerto de Québec by André Mathieu	I Will Survive by Gloria Gaynor; A Little Less Conversation by Elvis Presley
2010–2011	Feeling Good by Michael Bublé	El Día Que Me Quieras by Raúl Di Blasio	
2009–2010	Farrucas by Pepe Romero; Chano Lobato; Maria Madgalena; Paco Romero (Flamenco)	Madame Butterfly by Giacomo Puccini; Butterfly Lovers Violin Concerto both performed by Vanessa-Mae	
2008–2009	Din Daa Daa (MI remix) by George Kranz; Seventeen Years by Ratatat	Madame Butterfly by Giacomo Puccini; Butterfly Lovers Violin Concerto both performed by Vanessa-Mae	Shout by The Isley Brothers
2007–2008	Shout and Feel It by James Horner	Samurai (from Le Rêve); Banquine (from Journey of Man) by Benoît Jutras	

== Competitive highlights ==
GP: Grand Prix; CS: Challenger Series; JGP: Junior Grand Prix

=== With Serafini for United States ===
International
Event	18–19	19–20	20–21
GP Skate America			6th
CS Finlandia Trophy		5th	
CS Golden Spin		7th	
National
U.S. Championships	13th	7th	6th
U.S. Pairs Final		1st	
ISP Points Challenge			6th
TBD = Assigned

=== With Castelli for United States ===
International
Event	14–15	15–16	16–17	17–18
Four Continents		6th		
GP France		6th	5th	6th
GP Rostelecom Cup				7th
GP Skate America			7th	
GP Skate Canada		4th		
CS Autumn Classic			3rd	4th
CS Golden Spin		5th		
CS U.S. Classic		2nd		
Autumn Classic		2nd		
National
U.S. Championships	6th	3rd	2nd	6th

=== With Purich for Canada ===
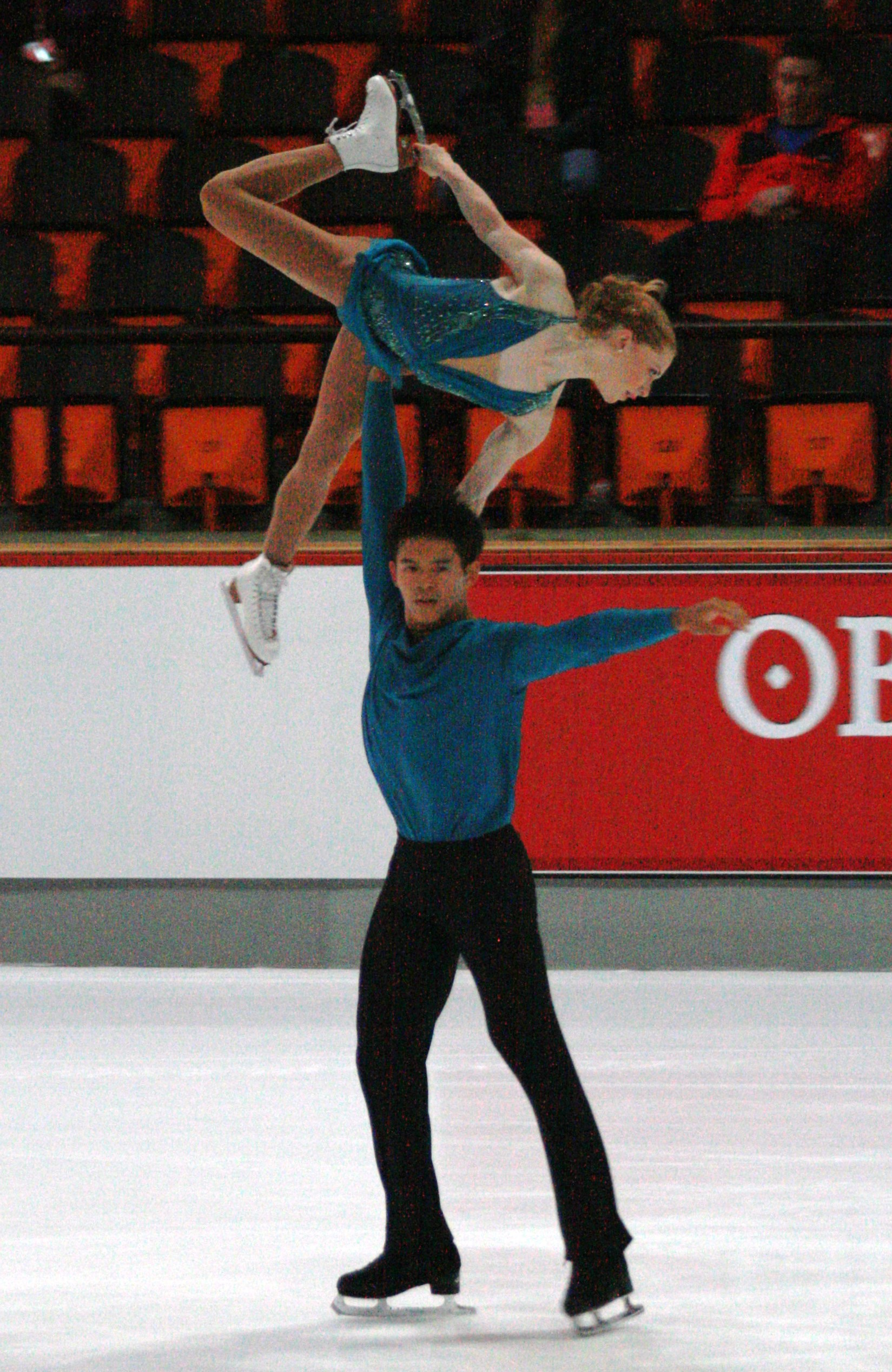
Purich/Tran at the 2013 Nebelhorn Trophy

International
Event	2013–14
Four Continents Championships	5th
GP Trophée Éric Bompard	6th
Nebelhorn Trophy	6th
National
Canadian Championships	4th

=== With Takahashi for Japan ===
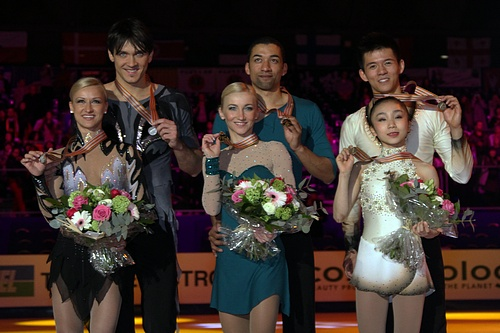
Takahashi/Tran with their fellow medalists at the 2012 World Championships

International
Event	07–08	08–09	09–10	10–11	11–12	12–13
Worlds				9th	3rd	
Four Continents			5th	7th	5th	
Grand Prix Final					6th	
GP Cup of China						WD
GP NHK Trophy			8th	3rd	2nd	WD
GP Rostel. Cup				2nd		
GP Skate Canada					4th	
International: Junior
Junior Worlds	15th	7th	2nd	3rd		
JGP Final		7th	2nd	1st		
JGP Estonia	12th					
JGP Germany	6th			2nd		
JGP Mexico		4th				
JGP Poland			1st			
JGP U.K.		3rd		2nd		
JGP USA			3rd			
National
Japan Champ.		1st	1st	1st	1st	
Japan Junior	1st					
Team events
World Team; Trophy		3rd T 6th P			1st T 3rd P	
WD: Withdrew; T = Team result; P = Personal result; Medals awarded for team result only.
