= Lorenza Alessandrini =

Italian ice dancer (born 1990)

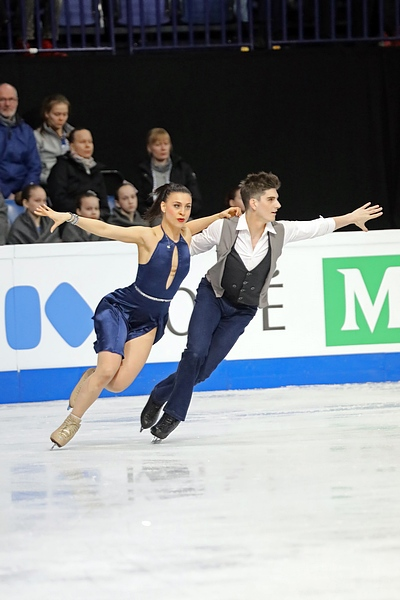
- Alessandrini and Souquet in 2017.

Personal information
- Born: 6 August 1990 (age 36) Milan, Italy
- Height: 1.63 m (5 ft 4 in)

Figure skating career
- Country: France
- Partner: Pierre Souquet
- Coach: Muriel Boucher-Zazoui
- Began skating: 1994
- Retired: 1 February 2018

Medal record
Representing Italy
Italian Championships
| Bronze medal – third place | 2011 Milan | Ice dance |
| Bronze medal – third place | 2012 Courmayeur | Ice dance |
| Bronze medal – third place | 2014 Merano | Ice dance |

Lorenza Alessandrini (born 6 August 1990) is an Italian retired ice dancer who began representing France internationally in 2015. She and her skating partner, Pierre Souquet, competed in the final segment at the 2016 European Championships.

Earlier in her career, Alessandrini represented Italy with Simone Vaturi. They became two-time Cup of Nice silver medalists (2010, 2013), two-time Ondrej Nepela Memorial silver medalists (2011, 2012), and two-time Italian national bronze medalists. They competed in the final segment at five ISU Championships.

== Personal life ==
Lorenza Alessandrini was born on 6 August 1990 in Milan, Italy. She studied sports at Università telematica San Raffaele.

== Career ==
Alessandrini began learning to skate in 1994. She skated with Tommaso Forchini early in her ice dancing career.

=== Partnership with Vaturi ===
In 2007, she teamed up with Simone Vaturi. Representing Italy, they placed fifth at the 2010 World Junior Championships. Later that year, Alessandrini broke a rib in training causing them to miss the 2010–11 Grand Prix season. They returned to competition to win the senior bronze medal at the Italian Championships and were assigned one of Italy's two ice dance berths to the 2011 European Championships. They finished 16th in their first appearance at the event.

In the 2011–12 season, Alessandrini/Vaturi made their senior Grand Prix debut at 2011 NHK Trophy where they finished 5th. They again finished third at the Italian Championships. They were not named in the Italian team to the European Championships. Alessandrini/Vaturi were coached by Roberto Pelizzola and Nicoletta Lunghi in Italy until January 2012 when they moved to Detroit, Michigan to train under new coaches Pasquale Camerlengo, Massimo Scali, and Anjelika Krylova. They made their senior World debut at the 2012 World Championships in Nice, France.

In mid-December 2012, a fall while training a lift resulted in an injury to Vaturi and the team's withdrawal from the 2013 Italian Championships.

Vaturi ended their partnership in April 2014. In May, Alessandrini confirmed she was looking for a partner to continue her competitive career and expressed interest in eventually becoming a coach and choreographer.

=== Partnership with Souquet ===
Alessandrini teamed up with French ice dancer Pierre Souquet by July 2014. In December, the duo placed fourth at the French Championships. Making their international debut, they placed 5th at the Bavarian Open in February 2015.

Alessandrini/Souquet won their first international medal, silver, in October 2015 at the Cup of Nice, before taking silver at the French Championships in December. The following month, they competed at the 2016 European Championships in Bratislava, Slovakia. Ranked 16th in the short dance, they qualified to the free dance and finished 20th overall. They were coached by Muriel Zazoui, Olivier Schoenfelder, Diana Ribas, and Roberto Pelizzola in Lyon.

Making their Grand Prix debut, Alessandrini/Souquet placed 9th at the 2016 Trophée de France. They received the bronze medal at the French Championships.

== Programs ==
=== With Souquet ===
| Season | Short dance | Free dance |
|---|---|---|
| 2017–18 | Abre Que Voy; Historia de un Amor by Carlos Eleta Almaran; Cuba | U-Turn (Lili) by AaRON; Angel by Sarah McLachlan; Iris by Goo Goo Dolls |
| 2016–17 | Treat Me Rough by Debbie Gravitte; Rhythm by Casey McGill, Spirits of Rhythm | Trees; Summer by Max Richter; Love Actually by Craig Armstrong |
| 2015–16 | Sous le ciel de Paris; Les Grands Boulevards by Yves Montand | Walking in the Sand; The Lilac Tree; Walking in the Sand by Jeff Beck, Imelda May |
| 2014–2015 | Flamenco; The Mask of Zorro by James Horner | I Suoni dell'isola by Luis Bacalov; Cinema Paradiso; Fuga, ricerna, e ritorno by Ennio Morricone |

=== With Vaturi ===
| Season | Short dance | Free dance | Exhibition |
|---|---|---|---|
| 2013–14 | Quickstep: Foxtrot: Quickstep: | Prayer for Munich 1972 | |
| 2012–13 | Mary Poppins; A Spoonful of Sugar; Chim Chim Cher-ee; Supercalifraglisticexpialidocious | The Artist by Ludovic Bource; The Artist Ouverture; The Artist Main Theme; Waltz for Peppy; Peppy and George | |
| 2011–12 | Chiquitere; Mas que nada; Samba de Janeiro | Tosca by Giacomo Puccini; E lucevan le stelle; Com'e lunga l'attesa; Final scene | |
| 2010–11 | C'est si bon by Louis Armstrong | Rocco and His Brothers by Nino Rota | |
| | Original dance | | |
| 2009–10 | Italian folk dance | Tango medley | |
| 2008–09 | Blues: Minnie the Moocher; Swing: Ballando con le stelle by Paolo Belli | Schindler's List by John Williams | |

== Competitive highlights ==
GP: Grand Prix; CS: Challenger Series; JGP: Junior Grand Prix

=== With Souquet for France ===
International
| Event | 2014–15 | 2015–16 | 2016–17 | 2017–18 |
|---|---|---|---|---|
| World Champ. | | | 28th | |
| European Champ. | | 20th | | |
| GP Trophée de France | | | 9th | 10th |
| CS Finlandia Trophy | | | | 16th |
| CS Nebelhorn Trophy | | 8th | 7th | |
| CS Tallinn Trophy | | 8th | | 10th |
| Bavarian Open | 5th | 4th | 6th | |
| Cup of Nice | | 2nd | | 11th |
| Santa Claus Cup | | 6th | | |
| Toruń Cup | | | 5th | |
National
| French Championships | 4th | 2nd | 3rd | |
WD = Withdrew

=== With Vaturi for Italy ===
International
| Event | 07–08 | 08–09 | 09–10 | 10–11 | 11–12 | 12–13 | 13–14 |
|---|---|---|---|---|---|---|---|
| World Champ. | | | | | 16th | | |
| European Champ. | | | | 16th | | | 19th |
| GP NHK Trophy | | | | | 5th | | |
| GP Skate America | | | | | | 6th | |
| Bavarian Open | | | | | | 3rd | |
| Cup of Nice | | | | 2nd | | | 2nd |
| Golden Spin | | | | | 5th | | |
| Nepela Memorial | | | | | 2nd | 2nd | |
| Universiade | | | | 6th | | | |
| Volvo Open Cup | | | | | | | 3rd |
International: Junior
| World Junior Champ. | | 9th | 5th | | | | |
| JGP Final | | | 7th | | | | |
| JGP Croatia | 6th | | | | | | |
| JGP Germany | 6th | | 2nd | | | | |
| JGP Hungary | | | 3rd | | | | |
| JGP Italy | | 3rd | | | | | |
| JGP United Kingdom | | 7th | | | | | |
| Pavel Roman | | 1st J | | | | | |
National
| Italian Champ. | 3rd J | 1st J | 1st J | 3rd | 3rd | WD | 3rd |
J = Junior level; WD = Withdrew
