= Simone Vaturi =

Italian ice dancer

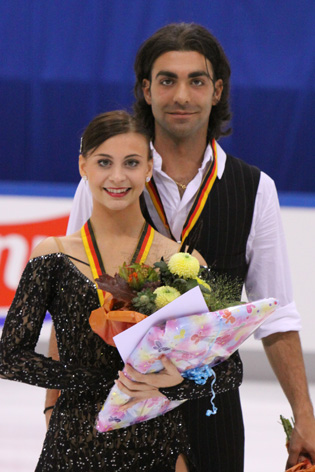
- Alessandrini and Vaturi in 2009.

Personal information
- Born: 20 July 1988 (age 37) Milan, Italy
- Height: 1.85 m (6 ft 1 in)

Figure skating career
- Country: Italy
- Coach: Pasquale Camerlengo, Massimo Scali, Anjelika Krylova
- Skating club: Forum SSDRL; Assago Milano
- Began skating: 1998

Medal record
Italian Championships
Bronze medal – third place	2011 Milan	Ice dance
Bronze medal – third place	2012 Courmayeur	Ice dance
Bronze medal – third place	2014 Merano	Ice dance

Simone Vaturi (born 20 July 1988) is an Italian ice dancer. With former partner Lorenza Alessandrini, he is the 2010 and 2013 Cup of Nice silver medalist, 2011 and 2012 Ondrej Nepela Memorial silver medalist, and a two-time Italian national bronze medalist.

== Personal life ==
Simone Vaturi has an elder brother, Andrea Vaturi, who is a choreographer and former competitive ice dancer. As of December 2013, he is a student at the University of Milan.

== Career ==
Early in his career, Vaturi skated with Serena Tancredi.

In 2007, he teamed up with Lorenza Alessandrini. They placed fifth at the 2010 World Junior Championships. Later that year, Alessandrini broke a rib in training causing them to miss the 2010–11 Grand Prix season. They returned to competition to win the senior bronze medal at the Italian Championships and were assigned one of Italy's two ice dance berths to the 2011 European Championships. They finished 16th in their first appearance at the event.

In the 2011–2012 season, Alessandrini/Vaturi made their senior Grand Prix debut at the 2011 NHK Trophy where they finished 5th. They again finished third at the Italian Championships. They were not named in the Italian team to the European Championships. Alessandrini/Vaturi were coached by Roberto Pelizzola and Nicoletta Lunghi in Italy until January 2012 when they moved to Detroit, Michigan to train under new coaches Pasquale Camerlengo, Massimo Scali, and Anjelika Krylova. They made their senior World debut at the 2012 World Championships in Nice, France.

In mid-December 2012, a fall while training a lift resulted in an injury to Vaturi and the team's withdrawal from the 2013 Italian Championships.

Vaturi ended their partnership in April 2014.

== Programs ==
(with Alessandrini)

Season	Short dance	Free dance	Exhibition
2013–2014	Quickstep: Foxtrot: Quickstep:	Prayer for Munich 1972	
2012–2013	Mary Poppins: A Spoonful of Sugar; Chim Chim Cher-ee; Supercalifraglisticexpialidocious	The Artist: The Artist Ouverture; The Artist Main Theme; Waltz for Peppy; Peppy and George by Ludovic Bource	
2011–2012	Chiquitere; Mas que nada; Samba de Janeiro	Tosca: E lucevan le stelle; Com'e lunga l'attesa; Final scene by Giacomo Puccini	
2010–2011	C'est si bon by Louis Armstrong	Rocco and His Brothers by Nino Rota	
	Original dance		
2009–2010	Italian folk dance	Tango medley	
2008–2009	Blues: Minnie the Moocher; Swing: Ballando con le stelle by Paolo Belli	Schindler's List by John Williams	

== Competitive highlights ==
(With Riazanova)

National
Event	2014–15
Italian Championships	4th

(With Alessandrini)

International
Event	2007–08	2008–09	2009–10	2010–11	2011–12	2012–13	2013–14
Worlds					16th		
Europeans				16th			19th
GP NHK Trophy					5th		
GP Skate America						6th	
Bavarian Open						3rd	
Cup of Nice				2nd			2nd
Golden Spin					5th		
Ondrej Nepela					2nd	2nd	
Universiade				6th			
Volvo Open							3rd
International: Junior
Junior Worlds		9th	5th				
JGP Final			7th				
JGP Croatia	6th						
JGP Germany	6th		2nd				
JGP Great Britain		7th					
JGP Hungary			3rd				
JGP Italy		3rd					
Pavel Roman		1st J.					
National
Italian Champ.	3rd J.	1st J.	1st J.	3rd	3rd	WD	3rd
GP = Grand Prix; JGP = Junior Grand Prix; J. = Junior level; WD = Withdrew
