= Ashley Wagner =

American figure skater (born 1991)

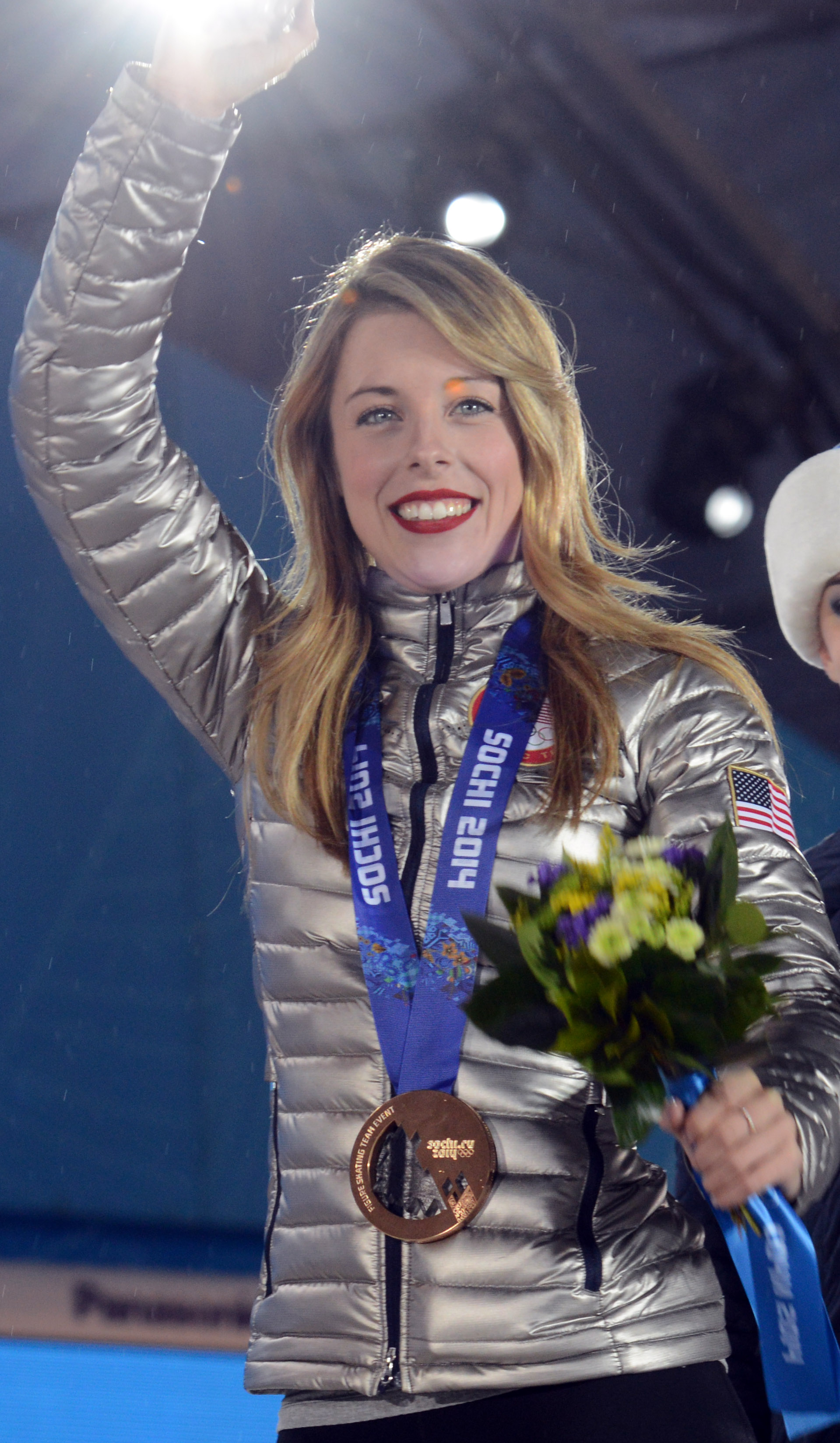
- Wagner at the 2014 Winter Olympics
- Born: Ashley Elisabeth Wagner; May 16, 1991 (age 35); Heidelberg, Germany
- Education: Northeastern University (BS)
- Occupations: Figure skater; television commentator
- Height: 5 ft 3 in (1.60 m)
- Spouse: Alex Clark (m. 2023)
- Children: 1
- Figure skating career
- Country: United States
- Discipline: Women's singles
- Coach: Rafael Arutyunyan
- Began skating: 1996
- Competitive: 2002-2019
- Retired: 2019
- Highest WS: 4th (2015-2017)

Medal record
Event	Gold medal – first place	Silver medal – second place	Bronze medal – third place
Olympic Games	0	0	1
World Championships	0	1	0
Four Continents Championships	1	0	0
Grand Prix Final	0	1	2
U.S. Championships	3	1	3
World Team Trophy	2	1	1
World Junior Championships	0	0	2
Junior Grand Prix Final	0	1	0
Medal list
Olympic Games
Bronze medal – third place	2014 Sochi	Team
World Championships
Silver medal – second place	2016 Boston	Singles
Four Continents Championships
Gold medal – first place	2012 Colorado Springs	Singles
Grand Prix Final
Silver medal – second place	2012–13 Sochi	Singles
Bronze medal – third place	2013–14 Fukuoka	Singles
Bronze medal – third place	2014–15 Barcelona	Singles
U.S. Championships
Gold medal – first place	2012 San Jose	Singles
Gold medal – first place	2013 Omaha	Singles
Gold medal – first place	2015 Greensboro	Singles
Silver medal – second place	2017 Kansas City	Singles
Bronze medal – third place	2008 Saint Paul	Singles
Bronze medal – third place	2010 Spokane	Singles
Bronze medal – third place	2016 Saint Paul	Singles
World Team Trophy
Gold medal – first place	2013 Tokyo	Team
Gold medal – first place	2015 Tokyo	Team
Silver medal – second place	2012 Tokyo	Team
Bronze medal – third place	2017 Tokyo	Team
World Junior Championships
Bronze medal – third place	2007 Oberstdorf	Singles
Bronze medal – third place	2009 Sofia	Singles
Junior Grand Prix Final
Silver medal – second place	2006–07 Sofia	Singles

Ashley Elisabeth Wagner (born May 16, 1991) is an American former competitive figure skater. She is the 2016 World silver medalist, a 2014 Olympic bronze medalist in the team event, the 2012 Four Continents champion, a three-time Grand Prix Final medalist (1 silver, 2 bronze), a thirteen-time Grand Prix medalist (5 gold, 3 silver, 5 bronze), and a three-time U.S. national champion (2012, 2013, and 2015). Wagner competed at the 2014 Winter Olympics in Sochi, Russia, and placed 7th. At the junior level, Wagner is a two-time World Junior bronze medalist (2007, 2009), the 2006-07 Junior Grand Prix Final silver medalist, a two-time Junior Grand Prix medalist (2 gold), and the 2007 U.S. junior bronze medalist.

Wagner joined NBC as a color commentator for the 2020 European Figure Skating Championships. She provided figure skating analysis for NBC's world feed at the 2024 U.S. Championships alongside fellow figure skater and former training mate Adam Rippon.

== Early life ==
Ashley Wagner is the first child and only daughter of American parents Lieutenant Colonel Eric Wagner, U.S. Army (retired) and Melissa James, a former schoolteacher. Wagner was born in 1991 on a U.S. Army base in Heidelberg, Germany, where her father was stationed at the time. Her younger brother was a skater and competed on the national level.

Because Wagner's father was in the army, she was a military brat when her family moved nine times during her childhood; they settled in northern Virginia when she was ten years old.

Wagner was homeschooled by her mother for seven months. She later attended West Potomac High School through the 2007/2008 school year.

After studying at Northern Virginia Community College via its online Extended Learning Institute, she enrolled in Saddleback College in California but did not graduate.

== Skating career ==
=== Early career ===
Wagner began skating at age five in Eagle River, Alaska. She says that her mother told her she could choose between ballet or figure skating, but she "wasn't going to do anything in pink shoes." According to her mother, Wagner began to show promise early and won a gold medal at her first competition. In 1998, Wagner watched Tara Lipinski win the gold medal at the 1998 Winter Olympics in Nagano, Japan on television. From that moment, she decided that she wanted to compete in the Olympics too.

Wagner later trained in Kansas City and Tacoma, Washington until her family moved to Portland, Oregon, where she was taught by Tonya Harding's former coach, Dody Teachman. In January 2002, Wagner began training with Shirley Hughes in Alexandria, Virginia. Jill Shipstad-Thomas choreographed her competitive programs.

In the 2002–03 season, Wagner qualified for the U.S. Junior Figure Skating Championships, which are the national championships of the United States for figure skaters at the juvenile and intermediate levels. Wagner placed 17th at the Intermediate level. The following season she tested up to the novice level. She won the silver medal at her regional competition, the first step to qualifying for the national championships, but placed tenth at her sectional competition and did not qualify for the 2004 National Championships.

Wagner qualified for her first U.S. Championships in the 2004–05 season after placing first at both the Northwest Pacific Regionals and the Pacific Coast Sectionals. Competing on the novice level, she placed seventh at Nationals.

=== 2005–06 season: Junior international debut ===
For the 2005–06 season, Wagner moved up to the junior level. She won both the Northwest Pacific Regional and Pacific Coast Sectional competitions again to qualify for the National Championships. At the 2006 U.S. Nationals in St. Louis, Missouri, Wagner finished fourth on the junior level, earning the pewter medal. After the event, Wagner was named to the U.S. team for the Triglav Trophy in Slovenia, her first major international competition and where she made her international junior debut. There she landed six triple jumps, including a triple toe-triple toe combination, in her long program to move up from third in the short program to first overall.

=== 2006–07 season: Bronze medal at Junior Worlds ===
In the 2006–07 season, Wagner made her Junior Grand Prix debut. She won both the Junior Grand Prix event in Courchevel, France, and the event in The Hague, Netherlands. Her wins qualified her for the Junior Grand Prix Final in Sofia, Bulgaria, where she won the silver medal behind fellow American Caroline Zhang, with a final score of 142.01. At the 2007 U.S. Nationals in Spokane, Washington, Wagner placed third behind Mirai Nagasu and Caroline Zhang, earning herself a spot on the World Junior Championships team. Her bronze medal at the 2007 Nationals was the first time she had placed in the top three at the national championships. At the 2007 Junior Worlds in Oberstdorf, Germany, she landed seven triple jumps in her long program. She finished with the bronze medal behind Zhang and Nagasu, completing the first-ever American sweep of the World Junior podium.

=== 2007–08 season: Senior debut ===
Wagner moved up to the senior level both nationally and internationally for the 2007–08 season. She made her senior international debut at the 2007 Skate Canada International in Quebec City, Quebec, where she placed fifth overall. Two weeks later, Wagner won her first senior international medal at the 2007 Trophée Éric Bompard in Paris, France. She placed third behind reigning World silver medalist Mao Asada and reigning U.S. National Champion Kimmie Meissner. She finished second in the long program ahead of Meissner and only lost to Meissner in the final standings by 0.11 points. During her fall Grand Prix events, Wagner attempted the triple Lutz-triple loop combination for the first time in competition, but it was downgraded by the technical callers because her attempts were not fully rotated. Discussing her first year on the Grand Prix, Wagner said, "Competing on the Grand Prix has forced my skating to mature. I'm a senior lady now, and I need to perform like one."

In January 2008, Wagner competed on the senior level for the first time at the 2008 U.S. Nationals in St. Paul, Minnesota. She placed second in the short program behind Mirai Nagasu after landing a triple Lutz-triple loop combination. In the free skate, she placed second again, this time behind Rachael Flatt, after landing seven triples including another triple Lutz-triple loop combination. She finished with the bronze medal overall behind Nagasu and Flatt. Because Nagasu, Flatt, and pewter-medalist Caroline Zhang were too young to compete at an ISU Senior Championship event, Wagner was the only medal winner to be named to the Four Continents and World Championships teams. Because of her third-place finish at the 2008 Nationals, Wagner earned a bye to the 2009 U.S. Nationals.

At the 2008 Four Continents in Goyang, South Korea, Wagner finished twelfth in the short program, fifth in the free skate, and eighth overall. At the 2008 World Championships in Goteburg, Sweden, she finished 16th after placing 11th in the short program and 15th in the long program. She fell once in her free skate.

In June 2008, Wagner announced that she would be leaving her longtime coach Shirley Hughes to begin working with Priscilla Hill in Wilmington, Delaware.

=== 2008–09 season: Second bronze at Junior Worlds ===
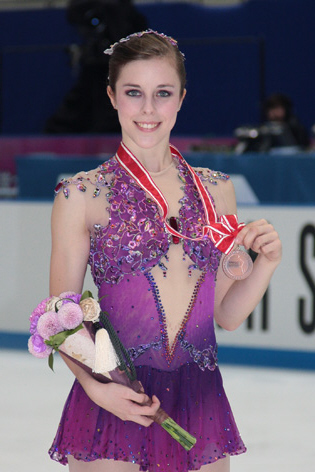
Wagner displays her bronze medal at the 2009 NHK Trophy.

For the 2008–09 Grand Prix of figure skating season, Wagner was assigned to compete at 2008 Cup of China where she finished fourth. Her next event was the 2008 NHK Trophy, where she again finished fourth. In the process she set new personal bests in the short program and her combined score.

She won the pewter medal at the 2009 U.S. Nationals and represented the United States at the 2009 Junior Worlds in Sofia, Bulgaria where she placed third, winning her second junior world medal.

=== 2009–10 season ===
For the 2009–10 Grand Prix season, Wagner was assigned to compete at the 2009 Rostelecom Cup, at that event she won the silver medal. In the process she set new personal best scores in her long program and her combined score. After winning the bronze medal at the 2009 NHK Trophy, she qualified for the Grand Prix Final. At the Final, Wagner ranked last in the short program, fourth in the free skate, and fourth overall.

At the 2010 U.S. Nationals, Wagner won her second bronze medal. She was placed on the team to the 2010 Junior Worlds, but withdrew from the team before the event.

=== 2010–11 season ===
A racing heartbeat that had long bothered Wagner became more frequent during the summer before the 2010–11 season. She also began to suffer violent full-body muscle spasms which her coach Priscilla Hill said were "some of the most horrific things I've ever seen." She saw a number of physicians who were unable to determine the cause. Finally, chiropractor and muscle specialist Steve Mathews revealed that tension in her neck muscles was causing one of her vertebrae to be pushed out of place, squeezing various nerves; a physical therapy program reduced the problems.

Wagner had practiced her new long program only about six times before she competed at 2010 NHK Trophy where she finished fifth. At 2010 Cup of Russia she won the bronze medal.

In June 2011, Wagner announced that she would move to Aliso Viejo, California to train with John Nicks and Phillip Mills at the Aliso Viejo Ice Palace. She quit her part-time job at American Eagle and used some of the money she had been saving for college in order to move across the country.

=== 2011–12 season: First National title, Four Continents title ===
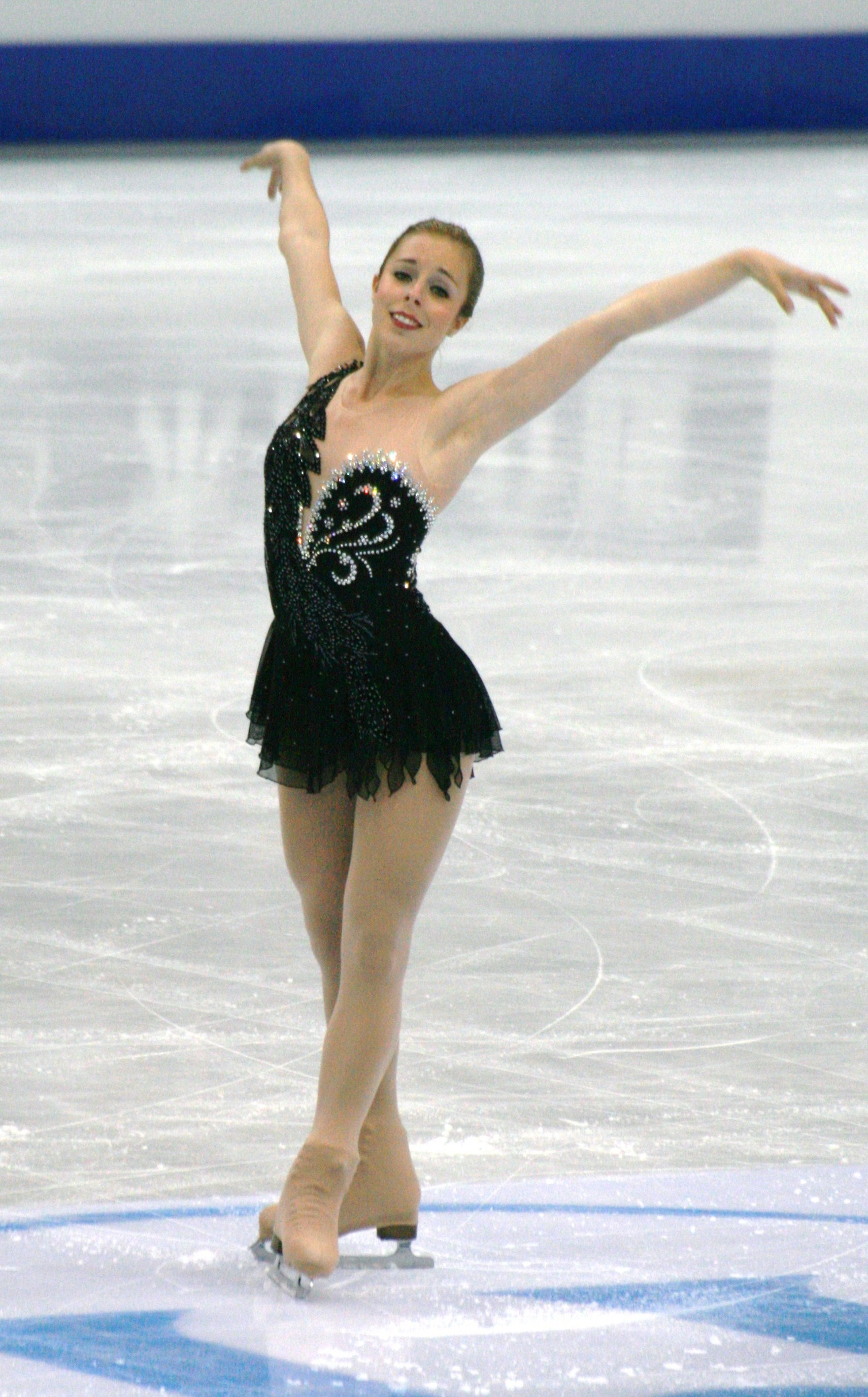
Wagner performs her free program at the 2012 Worlds.

Wagner began the 2011–12 season at the 2011 Skate Canada International. She placed second in the short program and third in the freeskate to win the bronze medal overall. At the 2011 NHK Trophy, Wagner placed fifth in the short program and third in the freeskate to finish fourth overall. At the 2012 U.S. Nationals, she ranked third in the short program. She was first in the free program and won her first national title.

After her U.S. Championship win, Wagner was assigned to both the 2012 Four Continents Championships and the 2012 World Championships. At Four Continents, she placed second in the short program after two-footing a planned triple flip-triple toe combination and successfully landing her triple loop and double axel. She placed first in a free skate which included six triples and won the gold medal ahead of two time world champion Mao Asada. Her scores at the Four Continents event were the highest overall for a world lady all season and her free program score was the second highest of the season behind Carolina Kostner's gold medal-winning free skate at the 2012 World Championships. At the World Championships, Wagner was eighth in the short program after stepping out of her triple flip. She placed third in the free skate with a seven triple program, and fourth overall, thus securing two spots for U.S. ladies at the 2013 Worlds.

=== 2012–13 season: Skate America title, First Grand Prix Final medal ===
At her first Grand Prix assignment of the season, the 2012 Skate America, Wagner placed first in both programs and won her first gold on the GP series. At the 2012 Trophée Éric Bompard, she was second in the short and first in the long and won her second GP title, qualifying for the 2012 Grand Prix Final. In a November 2012 interview, Wagner said, "Nicks changed my technique a little bit but not a ton. [...] The mental aspect of my training is where he really has helped me because confidence leads to consistency under pressure."

At the Grand Prix Final in December, Wagner placed second in the short. A pair of hard falls during the free skate injured her left hip (hip pointer) and bruised her right knee but she was able to complete the program and finished fourth in the segment. In the overall standings, she finished with the silver medal, just ahead of Japan's Akiko Suzuki. At the 2013 U.S. Championships, Wagner placed first in the short program, second in the free skate after falling twice and two-footing her salchow jump, and was able to edge out Gracie Gold to win her second straight national title. She was the first U.S. ladies' single skater to win consecutive national titles since Michelle Kwan in 2005.

Wagner's luggage that contained her skates was lost on her way to the 2013 World Championships but arrived before the evening practice on March 12. She placed fifth at Worlds, while her teammate, Gracie Gold, placed sixth. With these placements, they gained three spots for the Olympics and World Championships. Wagner placed second at the 2013 World Team Trophy and the United States won the event. One week later, Phillip Mills, her choreographer, announced that he had given Wagner his resignation. On April 24, John Nicks said he would no longer travel but would still coach Wagner at the Aliso Viejo Ice Palace. On June 25, Wagner said she would also train in Lake Arrowhead, California with Rafael Arutyunyan, who would accompany her to competitions.

=== 2013–14 season: Sochi Olympics ===
In the 2013–14 ISU Grand Prix season, Wagner won the silver medal at her first event, the 2013 Skate America. Her next assignment was the 2013 Trophée Éric Bompard where she won gold and qualified for the 2013–14 Grand Prix Final in Fukuoka, Japan. Wagner won bronze at the final behind Yulia Lipnitskaya after placing third in both segments. After both a short program where she finished fourth, falling twice, and only landing four triples during the free program, Wagner finished fourth at the 2014 U.S. Championships. She was named to the U.S. team for the 2014 Winter Olympics in Sochi, Russia, despite finishing behind third place Mirai Nagasu, due to her strong international record, which is considered under the selection criteria. Following the U.S. Championships, she also announced her return to her Samson and Delilah free program. She won a team bronze medal at the Olympics.

She continued on to compete at the 2014 World Figure Skating Championships in Saitama, Japan, where she placed seventh in the short program, fourth in the free skate, and finished in seventh place overall.

=== 2014–15 season: Third national title ===
For the 2014–15 season, Wagner was assigned to the 2014 Skate Canada and the 2014 Trophée Éric Bompard. After winning silver at Skate Canada behind Russia's Anna Pogorilaya and bronze at Trophée Bompard behind Russia's Elena Radionova and Yulia Lipnitskaya, she qualified in the last spot for the Grand Prix Final in Barcelona. Wagner is the first American woman since Michelle Kwan to qualify for three consecutive Grand Prix Finals. At the Grand Prix Final, Wagner placed sixth in the short program and third in the long program to win the bronze medal behind Russians Elizaveta Tuktamysheva and Radionova. The bronze is Wagner's third consecutive Grand Prix Final medal. At the 2015 U.S. Championships, Wagner won both the short program and free skate, setting a new U.S. record score of 221.02. Since Michelle Kwan in 1999, Wagner is the first U.S. senior ladies figure skater to win three national championships.

At the 2015 World Championships in Shanghai, Wagner placed 11th in the short program, third in the free skate, and fifth overall. At the 2015 World Team Trophy, she ranked fourth in both segments and Team USA won the event.

=== 2015–16 season: World medal ===
Wagner's two Grand Prix assignments for the 2015–16 season were 2015 Skate Canada International and 2015 NHK Trophy. She began her season by winning the gold medal at Skate Canada. She then went onto placing fourth at the NHK Trophy. Those results qualified her for the 2015–16 Grand Prix Final. At the Final she placed sixth in the short program, third in the free skate, and fourth place overall. At the 2016 U.S. Championships, Wagner was awarded the bronze medal behind Gracie Gold and Polina Edmunds.

Wagner competed at the 2016 World Championships in Boston. She placed fourth in the short with a personal best score of 73.16. She then competed as the last skater in the free skate, placing second by scoring another personal best of 142.23, the highest free program score ever recorded by an American woman (historical record). Her performances earned her the silver medal, becoming the first American woman to win a medal at the World Championships in a decade.

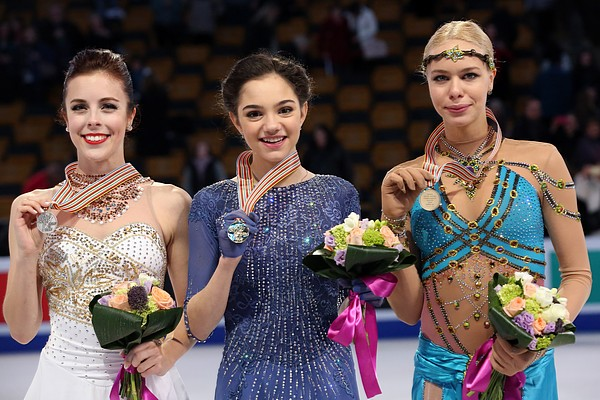
Wagner (left) holds her silver medal at the 2016 World Championships podium

Wagner finished her season by competing for Team North America at the inaugural 2016 KOSÉ Team Challenge Cup. Her performances greatly contributed to the team earning the gold medal.

=== 2016–17 season: Second Skate America title ===
In August 2016, Wagner spent three days working with Charyl Brusch on her spins, saying, "She just kind of stripped everything down and had me go back to basics. [...] I plan on going back later this season and building on that."

Wagner began her Grand Prix season at 2016 Skate America, where she became the first American woman since Michelle Kwan to regain a Skate America title.

At the 2016 Cup of China, a poor free skate led Wagner to her worst Grand Prix finish in her career as she finished just outside of the top 5, placing fifth in the short program, seventh in the free skate and sixth overall. While she subsequently did not qualify for the 2016-2017 Grand Prix Final, Wagner quickly rebounded with her first silver medal at the 2017 U.S. Championships behind Karen Chen. She placed third in the short program and second in the free skate to finish second overall.

At the 2017 World Championships in Helsinki, Wagner scored a 69.04 in the short program, placing seventh. In a somewhat lackluster free program, she scored a 124.50, placing tenth in the free program and seventh overall with a score of 193.54. Wagner's placement, combined with a fourth-place finish from USA's Karen Chen, qualified Team USA three spots for the 2018 Olympics and 2018 World Figure Skating Championships.

Wagner finished her season at the 2017 World Team Trophy, where her performances greatly contributed to Team USA winning the bronze medal.

=== 2017–18 season ===
Wagner revealed her music choices early for the 2017-18 Olympic season, announcing La La Land for her free skate. However, she went to back to her Moulin Rouge! program in the summer before competition. Wagner began her Grand Prix season at 2017 Skate Canada International, where she won the bronze medal after placing seventh in the short program and fourth in the free skate.

Wagner withdrew from her second Grand Prix event at 2017 Skate America in the middle of her free skate due to an ankle infection. Several days later, she revealed that she would return to her La La Land long program.

After placing fourth at the U.S. Figure Skating Championships, Wagner was named as the first alternate for the 2018 Winter Olympic team and the 2018 World Figure Skating Championship team. She was selected to compete at the 2018 Four Continents Figure Skating Championships, but opted to withdraw, giving her spot to alternate Angela Wang.

Wagner was eventually invited to compete at the 2018 World Figure Skating Championships due to Karen Chen's withdrawal, but declined. Mariah Bell was selected as the replacement.

As of January 2019, Wagner was taking a break from figure skating, and had moved to Boston, Massachusetts. She was a coach at the Skating Club of Boston. However, she did not officially announce her retirement.

In August 2019, Wagner retired from competitive skating.

== Skating technique ==
Wagner spins and jumps clockwise. She executed multiple triple-triple jump combinations in international competition including the 3Lz-3T, 3F-3T and 3Lo-1/2-3S, and successfully landed the 3Lz-3Lo at the 2008 U.S. Nationals. Her signature elements included a Charlotte spiral and a bent-leg layover camel spin with both arms outstretched above her head. She dislikes spins.

== Post-competitive career ==
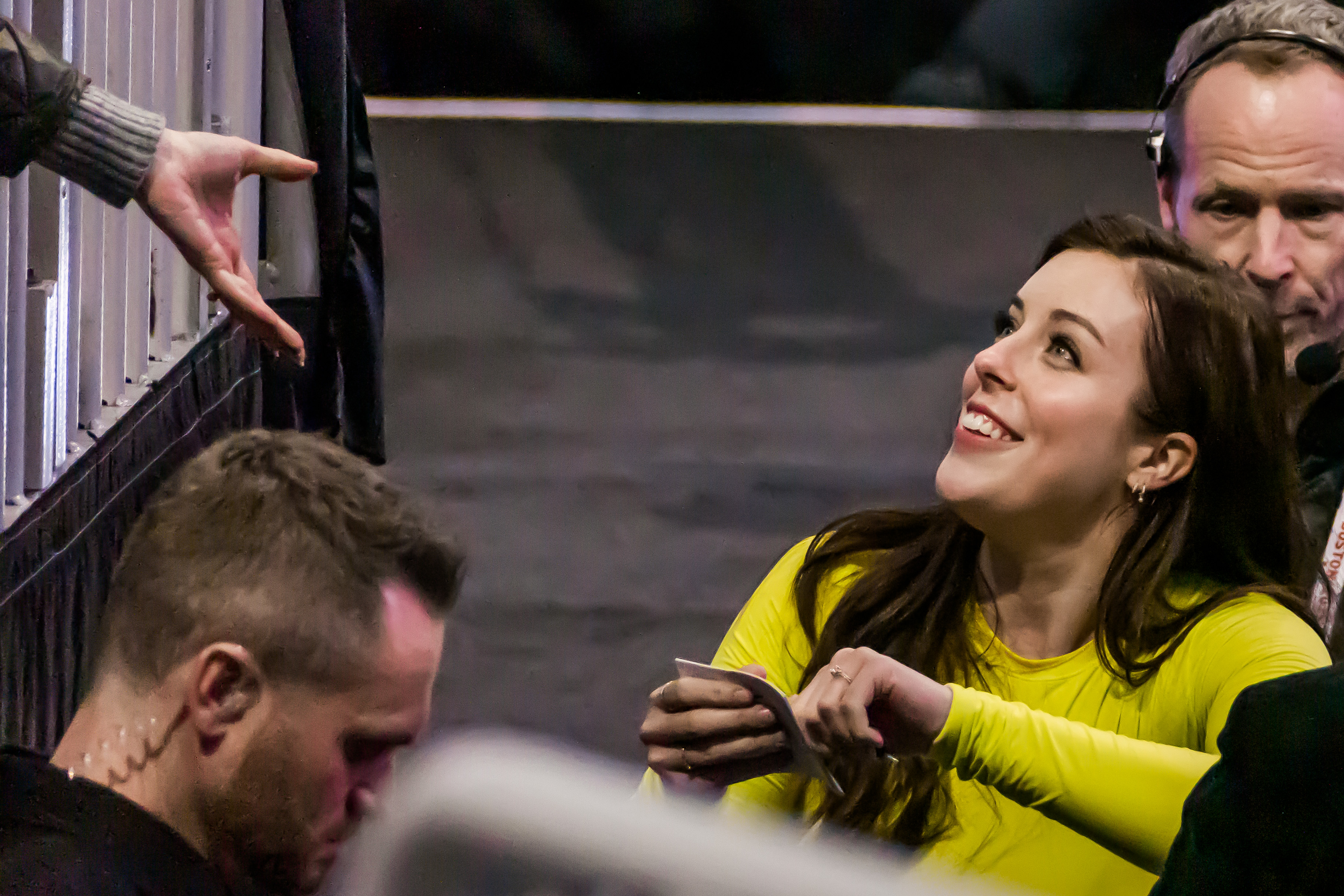
Wagner in attendance at the 2025 World Championships

Since retiring from competitive figure skating, Wagner has done figure skating commentary for NBC and Peacock.

In 2023, she started a figure skating podcast, titled "The Runthrough," which she currently hosts alongside Adam Rippon and Sarah Hughes (no relation to 2002 Olympic champion Sarah Hughes).

In 2023, Wagner graduated from Northeastern University with a B.S. in Psychology.

Wagner currently works as a Mental Performance Intern for Persistence Psych, an organization that helps clients address mental blocks that may be impeding performance.

== Personal life ==
Wagner has lived in Germany, Delaware, California, Alaska, Kansas, Washington state, and Virginia.

Wagner currently lives in Boston, Massachusetts but considers Seabeck, Washington, her home.

Wagner speaks a little German in addition to English.

In 2016, Wagner participated in a roundtable discussion with ESPN about concussions. Wagner said she has suffered several concussions and she believes these incidents had affected her cognitive abilities:

Memory to this day is really difficult for me. I have trouble recalling words. I have trouble focusing on conversations. Oftentimes, I find I have to pause and really think about what I'm trying to say to be able to have a conversation.

In 2017, Wagner posed nude for ESPN's The Body Issue magazine. Wagner appeared in the issue because she wanted people to see what a figure skater's body looks like:

It was really important to me for people to see what a figure skater's body really looks like. People think we're just these little porcelain dolls. At the end of the day, we have to be really strong, really lean athletes. We're using multiple cardiovascular systems when we're out there on the ice. So I'm stoked that I got to do the Body Issue so that people could see that we're athletes and that this is a real sport.

In July 2019, Wagner came forward and revealed that she was sexually assaulted as a 17-year-old by John Coughlin, a fellow figure skater who committed suicide the previous January after he was accused of multiple sex crimes.

Wagner announced in September 2023 that she was engaged to partner Alex Clark. In December of the same year she gave birth to the couple's first child, Rosalie Starbird Clark.

== Sponsorships ==
In November 2012, Nike began sponsoring Wagner. In December, she became one of Pandora Jewelry's style ambassadors. In October 2013, Wagner was named as a face of CoverGirl.

== Programs ==
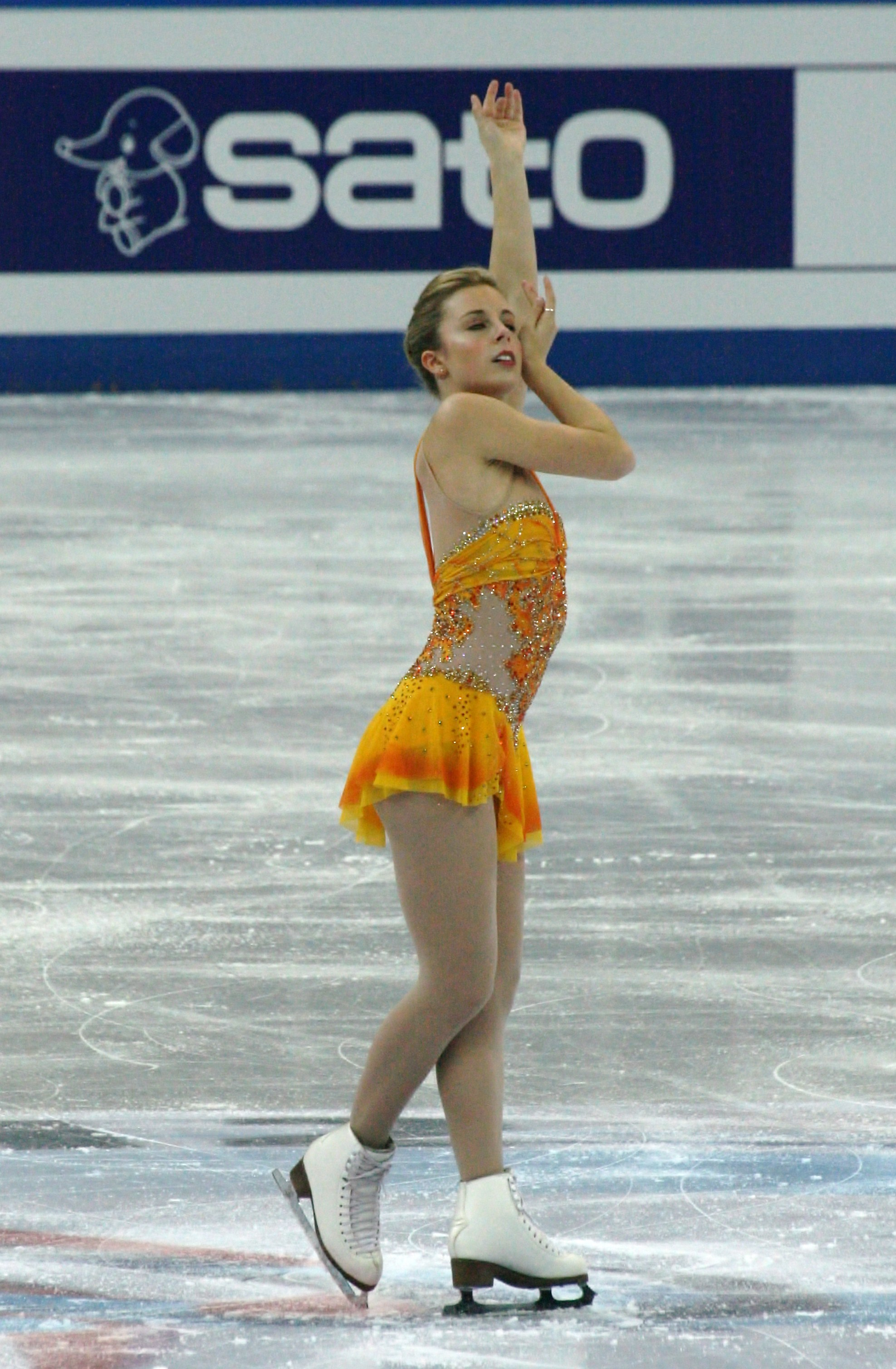
Wagner performs her free skate at the 2012–13 Grand Prix Final.

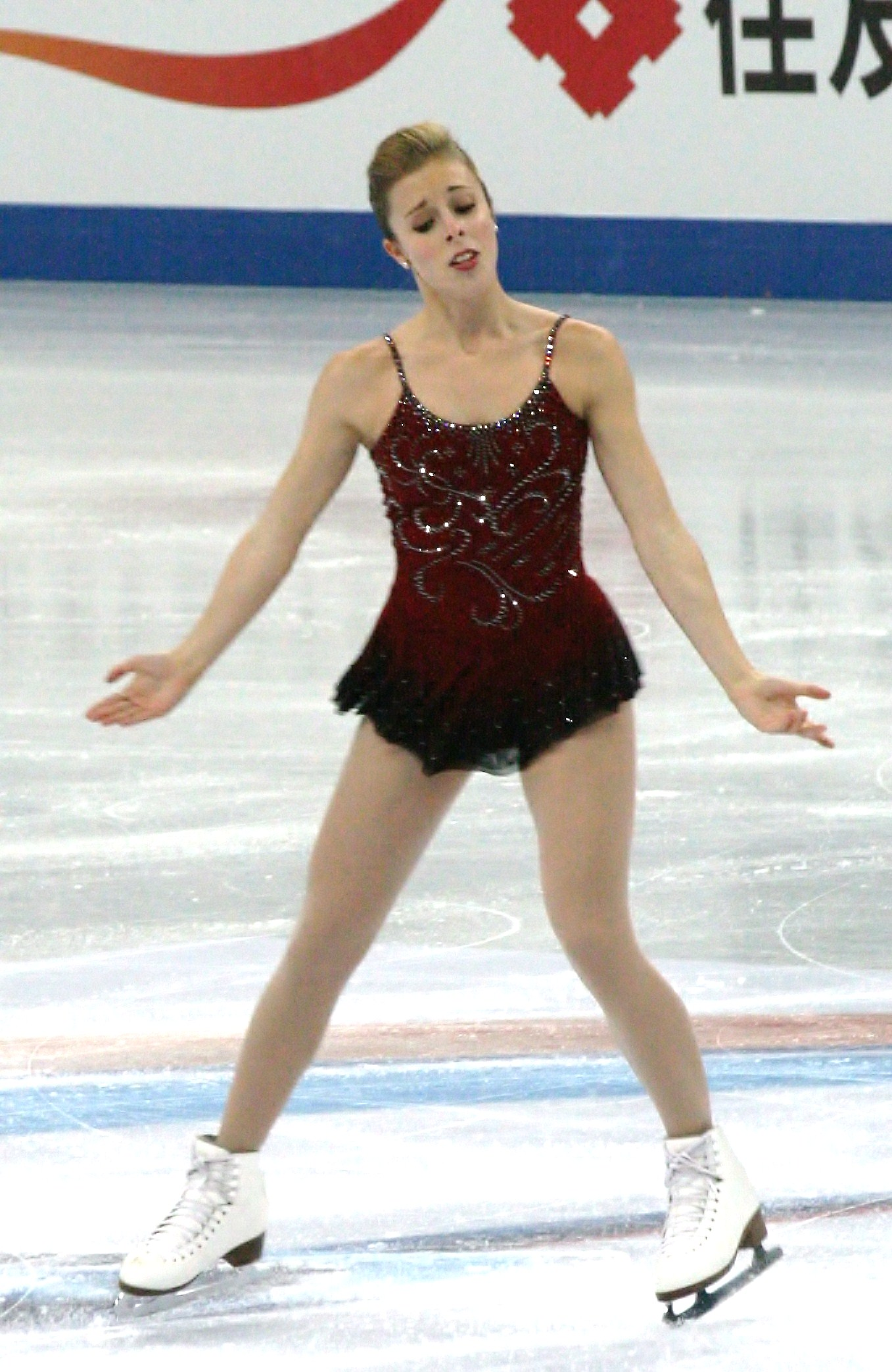
Wagner performs her short program at the 2012–13 Grand Prix Final.

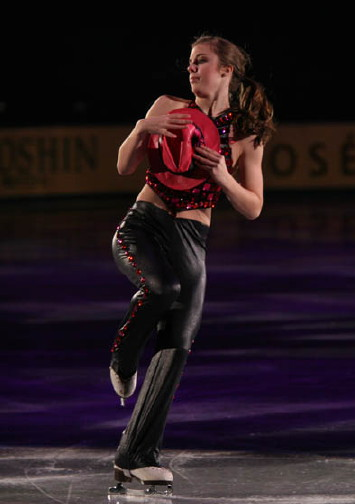
Wagner performs her exhibition Fever at the 2008 NHK Trophy.

Season	Short program	Free skating	Exhibition
2017–2018	Hip Hip Chin Chin by Club des Belugas choreo. by Shae-Lynn Bourne	La La Land; Audition (The Fools Who Dream) performed by Emma Stone; Someone in the Crowd; Epilogue; The End choreo. by Shae-Lynn Bourne; Moulin Rouge! choreo. by Shae-Lynn Bourne, Benji Schwimmer	La La Land choreo. by Shae-Lynn Bourne; I Am Here by Pink; HandClap by Fitz and the Tantrums
2016–2017	Sweet Dreams by Eurythmics choreo. by Jeffrey Buttle	Exogenesis: Symphony, Part 3 (Redemption) by Muse choreo. by Shae-Lynn Bourne	Exogenesis: Symphony, Part 3 (Redemption) by Muse choreo. by Shae-Lynn Bourne; HandClap by Fitz and the Tantrums; Dangerous Woman by Ariana Grande choreo. by Jeremy Abbott
2015–2016	Hip Hip Chin Chin by Club des Belugas choreo. by Shae-Lynn Bourne	Moulin Rouge!; Hindi Sad Diamonds; One Day I'll Fly Away performed by Nicole Kidman; The Show Must Go On performed by Jim Broadbent, Nicole Kidman choreo. by Shae-Lynn Bourne	Dangerous Woman by Ariana Grande choreo. by Jeremy Abbott; Hip Hip Chin Chin by Club des Belugas choreo. by Shae-Lynn Bourne; Imagine performed live by Twin Cities Gay Men's Chorus; One Last Night by Vaults; Rather Be by Clean Bandit choreo. by Shawn Sawyer
2014–2015	Spartacus by Aram Khachaturian choreo. by Adam Rippon, Cindy Stuart	Moulin Rouge!; Hindi Sad Diamonds; One Day I'll Fly Away performed by Nicole Kidman; The Show Must Go On performed by Jim Broadbent, Nicole Kidman choreo. by Shae-Lynn Bourne	Rather Be by Clean Bandit choreo. by Shawn Sawyer; One Last Night by Vaults; Love Me Harder by Ariana Grande and The Weeknd
2013–2014	Shine On You Crazy Diamond by Pink Floyd choreo. by Shae-Lynn Bourne	Bacchanale (from Samson and Delilah) by Camille Saint-Saëns choreo. by Phillip Mills; Romeo and Juliet by Sergei Prokofiev choreo. by David Wilson	Sweet Dreams by Eurythmics choreo. by Shae-Lynn Bourne; Young and Beautiful by Lana Del Rey
2012–2013	The Red Violin by John Corigliano choreo. by Phillip Mills	Bacchanale (from Samson and Delilah) by Camille Saint-Saëns choreo. by Phillip Mills	Sweet Dreams by Eurythmics choreo. by Shae-Lynn Bourne; Vienna by Billy Joel; Your Song by Ellie Goulding; Tightrope by Janelle Monáe
2011–2012	Pollock by Jeff Beal choreo. by Phillip Mills	Black Swan by Clint Mansell, Pyotr Tchaikovsky choreo. by Phillip Mills	Tightrope by Janelle Monáe; Your Song by Ellie Goulding; On the Floor by Jennifer Lopez and Pitbull
2010–2011	Once Upon a Time in America by Ennio Morricone; Kashmir by Led Zeppelin performed by London Philharmonic Orchestra	Malaguena by Ernesto Lecuona	Ain't No Other Man by Christina Aguilera
2009–2010	Once Upon a Time in America by Ennio Morricone	Polovtsian Dances by Alexander Borodin	Speechless by Lady Gaga
2008–2009	Somewhere in Time by John Barry	Spartacus by Aram Khachaturian	Fever by Bette Midler
2007–2008	Henry VIII by Camille Saint-Saëns	Tango Jalousie by Jacob Gade; Mambo Jambo by Pérez Prado	Bye Bye Blackbird by Liza Minnelli
2006–2007	The Cotton Club by Duke Ellington	Summertime by George Gershwin	Steam Heat
2005–2006	Henry V by Patrick Doyle	Scent of a Woman by Thomas Newman, Jose Padilla	

== Competitive highlights ==
GP: Grand Prix; JGP: Junior Grand Prix

=== 2006–07 to 2017–18 ===
International
Event	06–07	07–08	08–09	09–10	10–11	11–12	12–13	13–14	14–15	15–16	16–17	17–18
Olympics								7th				
Worlds		16th				4th	5th	7th	5th	2nd	7th	WD
Four Continents		8th				1st						WD
GP Final				4th			2nd	3rd	3rd	4th		
GP Bompard		3rd					1st	1st	3rd			
GP Cup of China			4th								6th	
GP NHK Trophy			4th	3rd	5th	4th				4th		
GP Rostelecom				2nd	3rd							
GP Skate America							1st	2nd			1st	WD
GP Skate Canada		5th				3rd			2nd	1st		3rd
International: Junior
Junior Worlds	3rd		3rd	WD								
JGP Final	2nd											
JGP France	1st											
JGP Netherlands	1st											
National
U.S. Champ.	3rd J	3rd	4th	3rd	6th	1st	1st	4th	1st	3rd	2nd	4th
Team events
Olympics								3rd T 7th P				
World Team; Trophy						2nd T 3rd P	1st T 2nd P		1st T 4th P		3rd T 6th P	
Team Challenge; Cup										1st T 3rd P		
Japan Open							2nd T 1st P	2nd T 3rd P	2nd T 6th P	2nd T 5th P	3rd T 3rd P	
J = Junior level; WD = Withdrew; T = Team result; P = Personal result. Medals awarded for team result only.

=== 2001–02 to 2005–06 ===
International
Event	05–06
Triglav Trophy	1st J
National
U.S. Championships	4th J

== Detailed results ==
Small medals for short program and free skating awarded only at ISU Championships. Pewter medals for fourth-place finishes awarded only at U.S. national and regional events. At team events, medals awarded for team results only.

=== Senior level ===
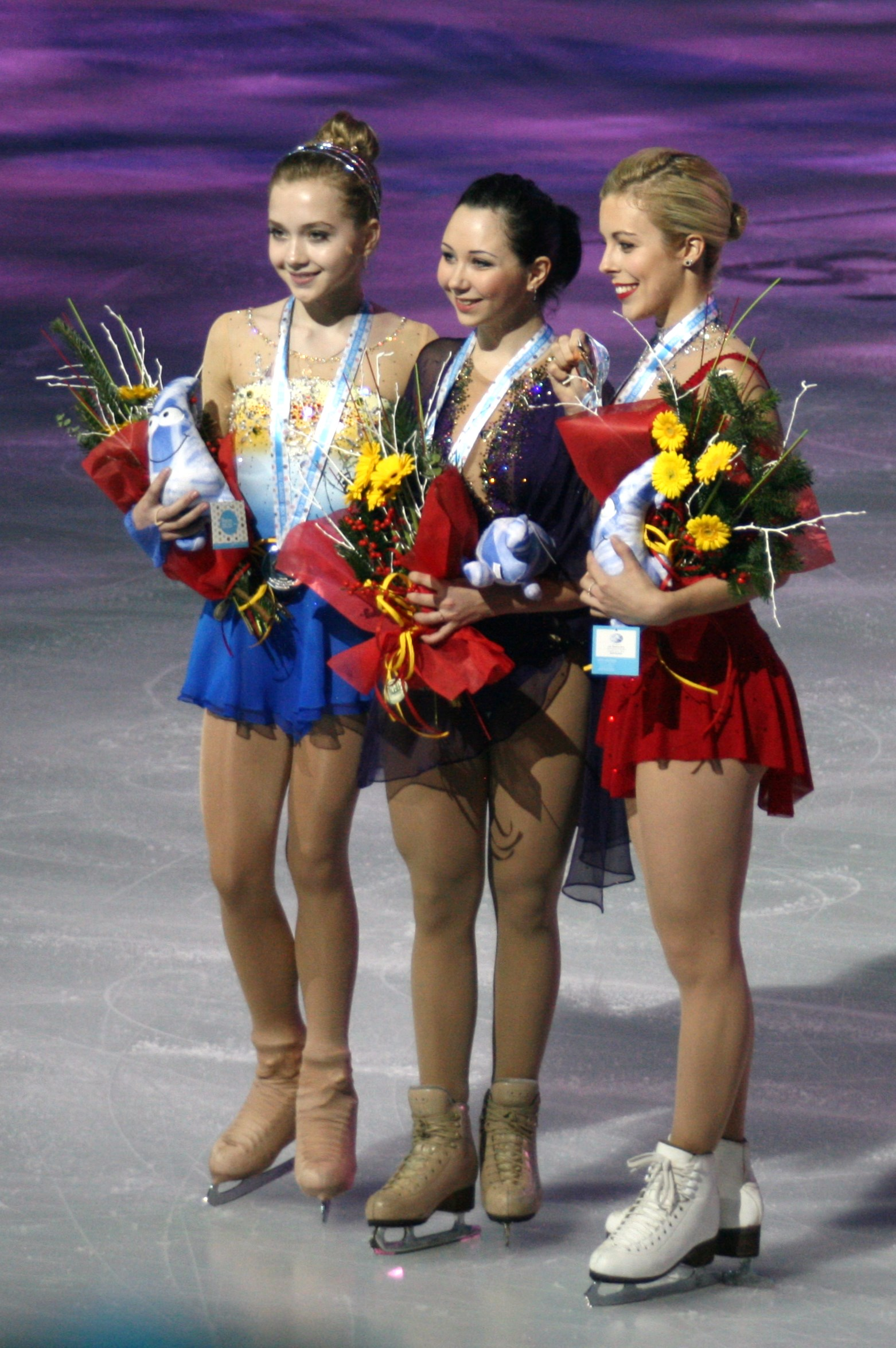
Wagner at the 2014–15 GP Final medal ceremony

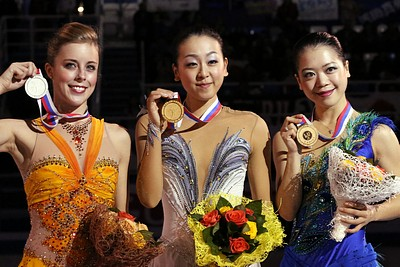
Wagner at the 2012–13 GP Final medal ceremony

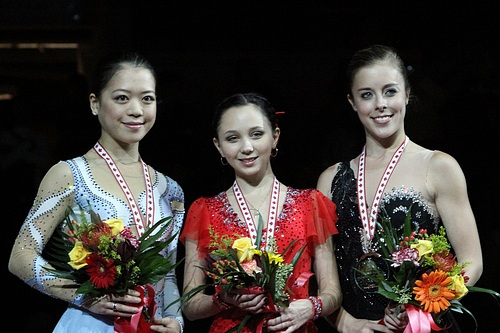
Wagner at the 2011 Skate Canada medal ceremony

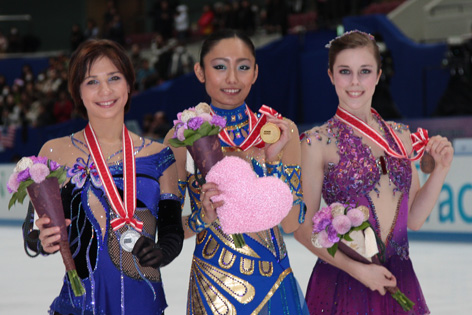
Wagner at the 2009 NHK Trophy medal ceremony

2017–18 season
Date	Event	SP	FS	Total
January 3–5, 2018	2018 U.S. Championships	5; 65.94	3; 130.25	4; 196.19
November 24–26, 2017	2017 Skate America	6; 64.12	WD	WD
October 27–29, 2017	2017 Skate Canada International	7; 61.57	4; 122.37	3; 183.94
2016–17 season
Date	Event	SP	FS	Total
April 20–23, 2017	2017 World Team Trophy	6; 70.75	6; 133.26	3T/6P; 204.01
March 29 – April 2, 2017	2017 World Championships	7; 69.04	10; 124.50	7; 193.54
January 14–22, 2017	2017 U.S. Championships	3; 70.94	2; 140.84	2; 211.78
November 18–20, 2016	2016 Cup of China	5; 64.36	7; 117.02	6; 181.38
October 21–23, 2016	2016 Skate America	1; 69.50	2; 126.94	1; 196.44
October 1, 2016	2016 Japan Open	–	3; 132.12	3T
2015–16 season
Date	Event	SP	FS	Total
April 22–24, 2016	2016 Team Challenge Cup	2T/2P; 74.54	1T/3P; 143.20	1T/3P; 217.74
March 28 – April 3, 2016	2016 World Championships	4; 73.16	2; 142.23	2; 215.39
January 16–24, 2016	2016 U.S. Championships	4; 62.41	3; 135.47	3; 197.88
December 10–13, 2015	2015–16 Grand Prix Final	6; 60.04	3; 139.77	4; 199.81
November 27–29, 2015	2015 NHK Trophy	3; 63.71	5; 115.62	4; 179.33
October 30 – November 1, 2015	2015 Skate Canada International	1; 70.73	2; 131.79	1; 202.52
October 3, 2015	2015 Japan Open	–	5; 117.84	2T
2014–15 season
Date	Event	SP	FS	Total
April 16–19, 2015	2015 World Team Trophy	4; 64.55	4; 126.96	1T/4P; 191.51
March 23–29, 2015	2015 World Championships	11; 57.81	3; 127.20	5; 185.01
January 18–25, 2015	2015 U.S. Championships	1; 72.04	1; 148.98	1; 221.02
December 11–14, 2014	2014–15 Grand Prix Final	6; 60.24	3; 129.26	3; 189.50
November 21–23, 2014	2014 Trophée Éric Bompard	3; 61.35	4; 116.39	3; 177.74
October 31 – November 2, 2014	2014 Skate Canada International	2; 63.86	2; 122.14	2; 186.00
October 4, 2014	2014 Japan Open	–	6; 100.99	2T
2013–14 season
Date	Event	SP	FS	Total
March 24–30, 2014	2014 World Championships	7; 63.64	4; 129.52	7; 193.16
February 20–21, 2014	2014 Winter Olympic Games	6; 65.21	7; 127.99	7; 193.20
February 6–9, 2014	2014 Winter Olympic Games – Team Event	4; 63.10	–	3T
January 9–11, 2014	2014 U.S. Championships	4; 64.71	5; 118.03	4; 182.74
December 5–8, 2013	2013–14 Grand Prix Final	3; 68.14	3; 119.47	3; 187.61
November 15–17, 2013	2013 Trophée Éric Bompard	1; 66.75	2; 127.62	1; 194.37
October 18–20, 2013	2013 Skate America	2; 69.26	2; 124.55	2; 193.81
October 5, 2013	2013 Japan Open	–	3; 119.77	2T
2012–13 season
Date	Event	SP	FS	Total
April 11–14, 2013	2013 World Team Trophy	4; 59.77	2; 128.83	1T/2P; 188.60
March 11–17, 2013	2013 World Championships	5; 63.98	6; 123.36	5; 187.34
January 19–27, 2013	2013 U.S. Championships	1; 67.57	2; 121.27	1; 188.84
December 6–9, 2012	2012–13 Grand Prix Final	2; 66.44	4; 115.49	2; 181.93
November 16–18, 2012	2012 Trophée Éric Bompard	2; 63.09	1; 127.54	1; 190.63
October 19–21, 2012	2012 Skate America	1; 60.61	1; 127.76	1; 188.37
October 6, 2012	2012 Japan Open	–	1; 123.57	2T
2011–12 season
Date	Event	SP	FS	Total
April 19–22, 2012	2012 World Team Trophy	5; 57.52	1; 122.29	2T/3P; 179.81
March 26 – April 1, 2012	2012 World Championships	8; 56.42	3; 120.35	4; 176.77
February 7–12, 2012	2012 Four Continents Championships	2; 64.07	1; 128.34	1; 192.41
January 22–29, 2012	2012 U.S. Championships	3; 63.06	1; 123.96	1; 187.02
November 11–13, 2011	2011 NHK Trophy	5; 55.88	3; 109.77	4; 165.65
October 27–30, 2011	2011 Skate Canada International	2; 54.50	3; 110.98	3; 165.48
2010–11 season
Date	Event	SP	FS	Total
January 22–30, 2011	2011 U.S. Championships	7; 54.63	5; 110.73	6; 165.36
November 19–21, 2010	2010 Cup of Russia	3; 56.17	3; 110.85	3; 167.02
October 22–24, 2010	2010 NHK Trophy	4; 52.93	6; 90.80	5; 143.73
2009–10 season
Date	Event	SP	FS	Total
January 14–24, 2010	2010 U.S. Championships	4; 62.55	2; 122.15	3; 184.70
December 3–6, 2009	2009–10 Grand Prix Final	6; 54.26	4; 107.81	4; 162.07
November 5–8, 2009	2009 NHK Trophy	1; 56.54	3; 99.45	3; 155.99
October 22–25, 2009	2009 Cup of Russia	5; 55.16	2; 108.81	2; 163.97
2008–09 season
Date	Event	SP	FS	Total
January 18–25, 2009	2009 U.S. Championships	12; 50.28	1; 115.05	4; 165.33
November 27–30, 2008	2008 NHK Trophy	2; 61.52	5; 99.58	4; 161.10
November 5–9, 2008	2008 Cup of China	4; 55.40	4; 100.19	4; 155.59
2007–08 season
Date	Event	SP	FS	Total
March 17–23, 2008	2008 World Championships	11; 51.49	15; 85.91	16; 137.40
February 11–17, 2008	2008 Four Continents Championships	12; 47.29	5; 105.17	8; 152.46
January 20–27, 2008	2008 U.S. Championships	2; 65.15	2; 123.41	3; 188.56
November 15–18, 2007	2007 Trophée Éric Bompard	5; 50.48	2; 108.15	3; 158.63
November 1–4, 2007	2007 Skate Canada International	8; 50.86	5; 99.20	5; 150.06

=== Junior level ===
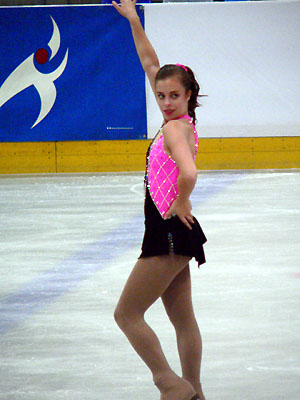
Wagner at the 2006 JGP Netherlands

2008–09 season
Date	Event	Level	SP	FS	Total
Feb. 23 – March 1, 2009	2009 World Junior Championships	Junior	2; 57.50	3; 96.07	3; 153.57
2006–07 season
Date	Event	Level	SP	FS	Total
Feb. 26 – March 4, 2007	2007 World Junior Championships	Junior	3; 51.67	3; 105.48	3; 157.15
January 21–28, 2007	2007 U.S. Championships	Junior	4; 51.20	3; 94.66	3; 145.86
December 7–10, 2006	2006–07 Junior Grand Prix Final	Junior	3; 48.65	2; 93.36	2; 142.01
October 5–7, 2006	2006 Junior Grand Prix, Netherlands	Junior	4; 44.98	1; 89.00	1; 133.98
August 23–26, 2006	2006 Junior Grand Prix, France	Junior	1; 49.52	1; 85.43	1; 134.95
2005–06 season
Date	Event	Level	SP	FS	Total
April 12–16, 2006	2006 Triglav Trophy	Junior	3; 38.74	1; 78.36	1; 117.10
January 7–15, 2006	2006 U.S. Championships	Junior	2; 45.85	4; 86.60	4; 132.45
November 15–19, 2005	2006 Pacific Coast Sectionals	Junior	1; 41.50	1; 83.72	1; 125.22
October 19–22, 2005	2006 Northwest Pacific Regionals	Junior	1	1	1
2004–05 season
Date	Event	Level	SP	FS	Total
January 9–16, 2005	2005 U.S. Championships	Novice	8	5	7
November 11–13, 2004	2005 Pacific Coast Sectionals	Novice	2	1	1
October 19–23, 2004	2005 Northwest Pacific Regionals	Novice	1	1	1

2003–04 season
Date	Event	Level	QR	SP	FS	Total
November 11–15, 2003	2004 Pacific Coast Sectionals	Novice		11	10	10
October 14–18, 2003	2004 Northwest Pacific Regionals	Novice	2	3	2	2

- QR = Qualifying round
