= Vladimir Morozov (figure skater) =

Russian pair skater

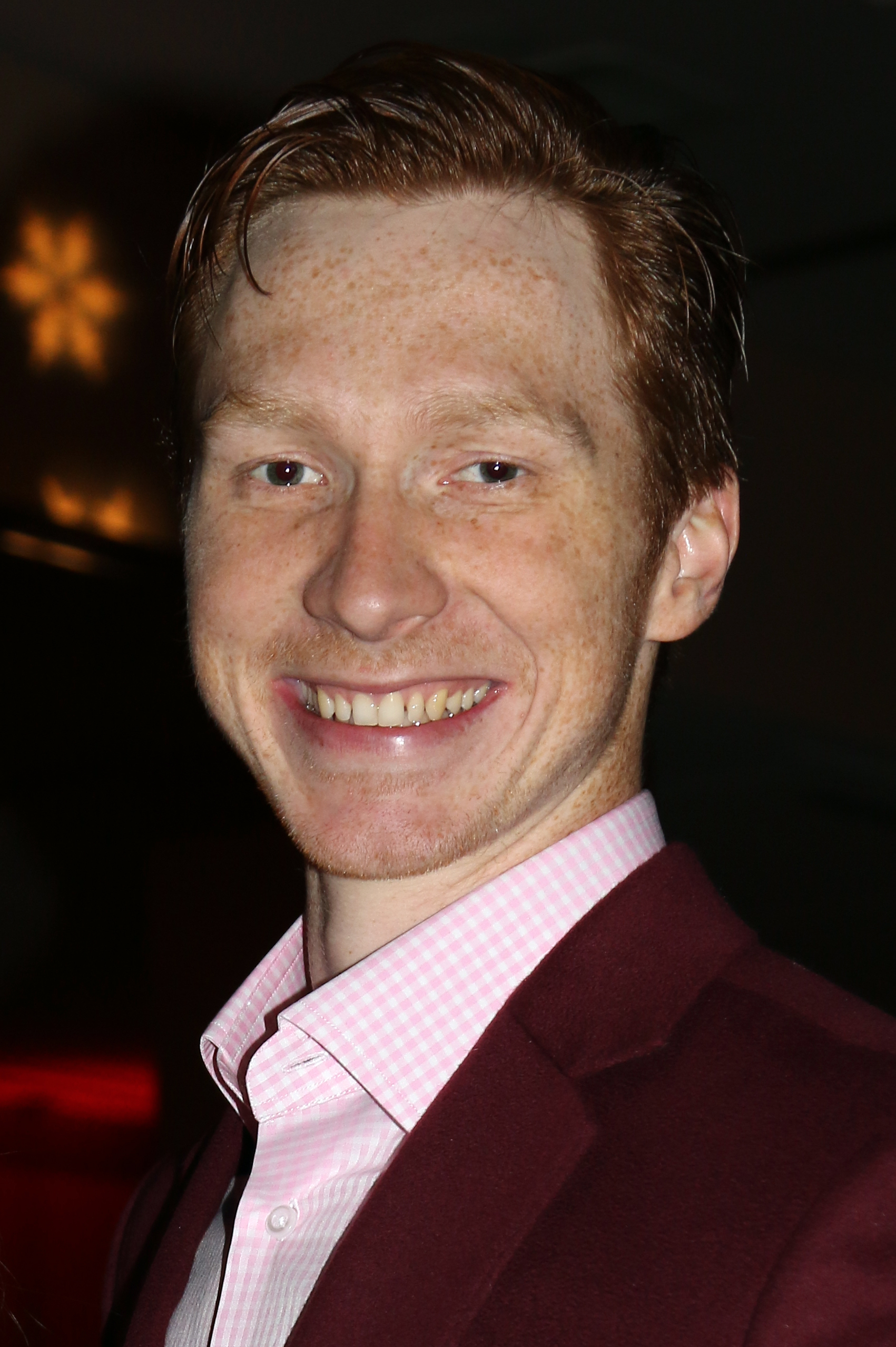
- Morozov in 2018

Personal information
- Native name: Владимир Евгеньевич Морозов
- Full name: Vladimir Evgenyevich Morozov
- Born: 1 November 1992 (age 34) Potsdam, Brandenburg, Germany
- Home town: Moscow, Russia
- Height: 1.90 m (6 ft 3 in)

Figure skating career
- Country: Russia
- Partner: Evgenia Tarasova
- Coach: Eteri Tutberidze, Sergei Dudakov, Daniil Gleikhengauz, Maxim Trankov
- Skating club: Vorobievie Gory
- Began skating: 1998
- Retired: November 13, 2023
Medal record

Figure skating: Pairs
Representing ROC
Olympic Games
Silver medal – second place	2022 Beijing	Pairs
Representing Olympic Athletes from Russia
Olympic Games
Silver medal – second place	2018 Pyeongchang	Team
Representing Russia
World Championships
Silver medal – second place	2019 Saitama	Pairs
Silver medal – second place	2018 Milan	Pairs
Bronze medal – third place	2017 Helsinki	Pairs
Grand Prix Final
Gold medal – first place	2016–17 Marseille	Pairs
Bronze medal – third place	2018–19 Vancouver	Pairs
European Championships
Gold medal – first place	2017 Ostrava	Pairs
Gold medal – first place	2018 Moscow	Pairs
Silver medal – second place	2019 Minsk	Pairs
Silver medal – second place	2020 Graz	Pairs
Silver medal – second place	2022 Tallinn	Pairs
Bronze medal – third place	2015 Stockholm	Pairs
Bronze medal – third place	2016 Bratislava	Pairs
Russian Championships
Gold medal – first place	2018 Saint Petersburg	Pairs
Gold medal – first place	2019 Saransk	Pairs
Gold medal – first place	2021 Chelyabinsk	Pairs
Silver medal – second place	2015 Sochi	Pairs
Silver medal – second place	2017 Chelyabinsk	Pairs
Silver medal – second place	2020 Krasnoyarsk	Pairs
Bronze medal – third place	2016 Yekaterinburg	Pairs
Bronze medal – third place	2022 Saint Petersburg	Pairs
Bronze medal – third place	2023 Krasnoyarsk	Pairs
World Team Trophy
Silver medal – second place	2017 Tokyo	Team
World Junior Championships
Silver medal – second place	2014 Sofia	Pairs

Vladimir Evgenyevich Morozov (Russian: Владимир Евгеньевич Морозов; born 1 November 1992) is a retired Russian pair skater. With partner Evgenia Tarasova, he is the 2022 Olympic silver medalist, a three-time World medalist (2018 and 2019 silver, 2017 bronze), a two-time European champion (2017, 2018), the 2016–17 Grand Prix Final champion, and a three-time Russian national champion (2018, 2019, 2021). Earlier in their career, they became the 2014 World Junior silver medalists and the 2014 Russian junior national champions.

== Personal life ==
Morozov was born on 1 November 1992 in Potsdam, Germany, to Russian parents. He studied psychology at the Moscow State University for the Humanities.

On 18 March 2022, Morozov appeared at Vladimir Putin's Moscow rally celebrating the annexation of Crimea by the Russian Federation from Ukraine and justifying the 2022 Russian invasion of Ukraine. He wore the Z military symbol used by the invading Russian army in Ukraine. In December 2022, the Ukrainian Parliament sanctioned Morozov for his support of the war.

== Skating career ==
=== Early career ===
Advised by his singles coach to try pairs due to his height and build, Morozov joined Nina Mozer's group in 2007. He skated three seasons with his first partner, Irina Moiseeva. They won three medals at Warsaw Cup — novice gold in 2007 and 2008 and junior silver in 2009 — and junior gold at the 2009 NRW Trophy. They split at the end of the 2009–10 season.

Morozov competed the next two seasons with Ekaterina Krutskikh. Their coach was Stanislav Morozov. In the 2011–12 season, they debuted on the ISU Junior Grand Prix series, finishing 6th and 8th at JGP events in Latvia and Estonia. Krutskikh/Morozov withdrew from the 2012 Russian Junior Championships following the short program and parted ways at the end of the season.

=== Teaming up with Tarasova ===
At the suggestion of Nina Mozer, Morozov teamed up with Evgenia Tarasova in the spring of 2012. The pair's main coach was Stanislav Morozov. Vladimir Morozov broke his foot one week into the new partnership and was out for three months.

=== 2012–2013 season ===
The pair's international debut came at a Junior Grand Prix event in Croatia, where they finished 5th. They withdrew from their next assignment in Germany.

Tarasova/Morozov won their first senior international title at the 2012 Warsaw Cup. At the Russian Championships, they placed fifth on the senior level and then won the silver medal on the junior level. The pair finished fifth at the 2013 Junior World Championships.

=== 2013–2014 season ===
Tarasova/Morozov won silver in Latvia and bronze in Estonia on the JGP series. They qualified for the JGP Final in Fukuoka, Japan, where they finished fourth in both segments and overall. The pair won the silver medal at the 2013 Winter Universiade behind teammates Ksenia Stolbova / Fedor Klimov. At the 2014 Russian Championships, Tarasova/Morozov finished eighth after placing third in the short program and tenth in the free skate. He fell on both of their jumping passes, and she was hurt when a lift collapsed near the end of their free program, but she was able to resume and complete the final element, a pair spin. Tarasova was taken to the hospital and found to have no serious injury. After winning the national junior title a month later, the pair was assigned to the 2014 World Junior Championships in Sofia, Bulgaria. They won the silver medal after placing second in both segments and finishing 5.57 points behind China's Yu Xiaoyu / Jin Yang.

=== 2014–2015 season ===
After parting ways with Stanislav Morozov in the off-season, Tarasova/Morozov turned to Andrei Hekalo, who had worked with them in the past, and Robin Szolkowy, who joined them in September 2014. The pair began the 2014–15 season by taking silver at a Challenger Series event, the 2014 Nebelhorn Trophy. They were assigned to two Grand Prix events, the 2014 Skate Canada International and 2014 Rostelecom Cup. Earning bronze and silver, respectively, the pair finished seventh in the Grand Prix standings, leaving them as first alternates to the Grand Prix Final.

Tarasova/Morozov won silver at the 2015 Russian Championships, ahead of Yuko Kavaguti / Alexander Smirnov. They were awarded the bronze medal at the 2015 European Championships in Stockholm, Sweden, before placing 6th at the 2015 World Championships in Shanghai, China.

=== 2015–2016 season ===
Tarasova/Morozov began their season with a bronze at a Challenger Series event, the 2015 Ondrej Nepela Trophy. Competing in the Grand Prix series, the pair won silver at the 2015 Skate Canada International and placed 7th in the short program at the 2015 Trophée Éric Bompard, before the event's cancellation due to the November 2015 Paris attacks. The short program standings were accepted as the final result.

In December, Tarasova/Morozov finished second in the CS standings after winning gold at the 2015 CS Golden Spin of Zagreb and then took the bronze medal at the Russian Championships after placing third in both segments. In January 2016, they won their second continental bronze medal at the European Championships in Bratislava, Slovakia. At the 2016 World Championships in Boston, they placed 6th in the short, 5th in the free, and 5th overall.

=== 2016–2017 season ===
Opening their season on the Challenger Series, Tarasova/Morozov took gold at the 2016 CS Ondrej Nepela Memorial after placing first in both segments. During the free skate, they performed their first quadruple twist in competition. On the Grand Prix series, they won the bronze medal at the 2016 Skate America, having placed first in the short and fifth in the free, and then silver at the 2016 Trophée de France, having placed second in the short and third in the free. They qualified as the fifth pair to the Grand Prix Final, held in December in Marseille, France. Ranked first in both segments, they were awarded gold ahead of China's Yu Xiaoyu / Zhang Hao.

At the 2017 European Championships, they claim the gold medal.

=== 2017–2018 season ===
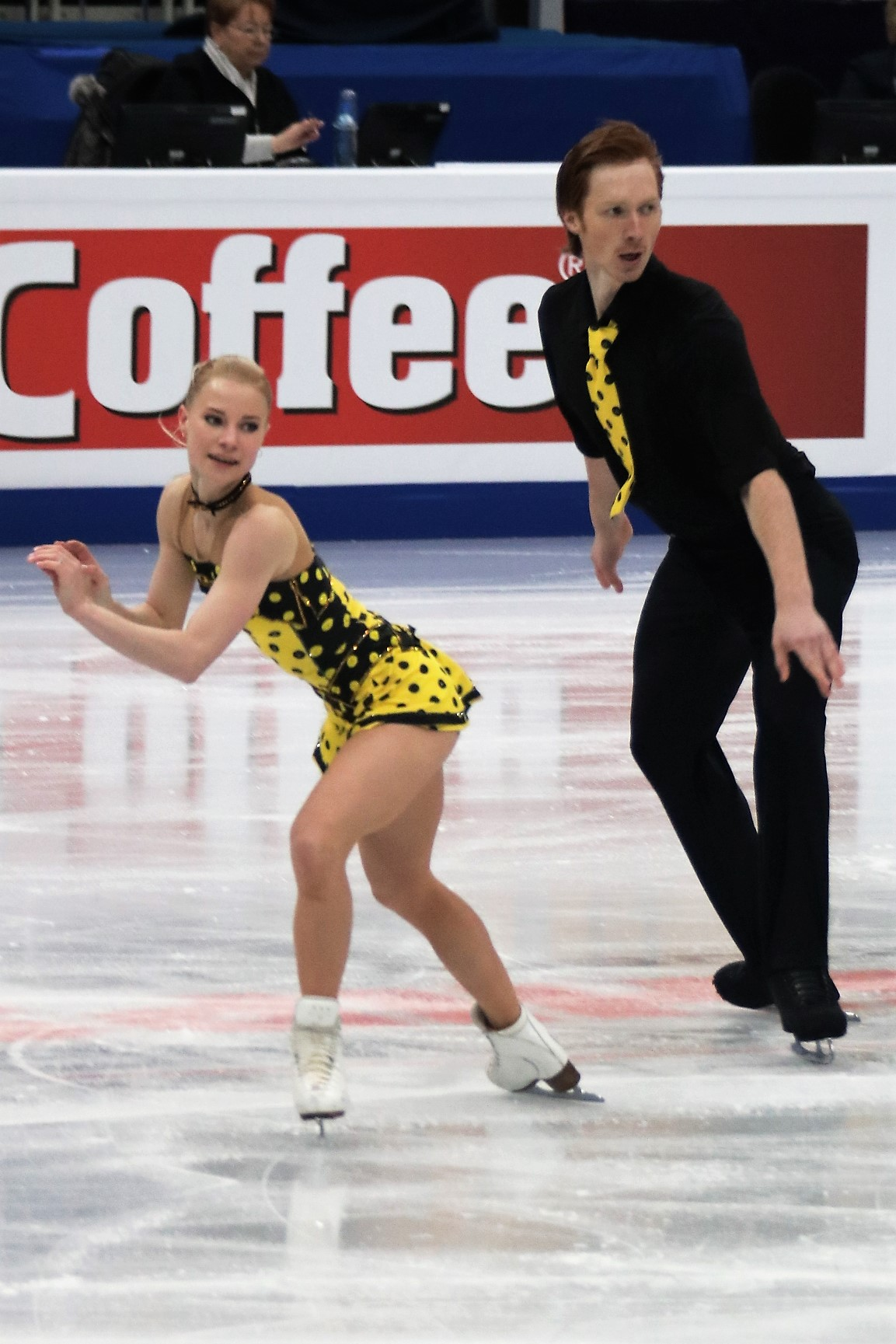
Tarasova and Morozov perform their "Candyman" free skate at the 2018 European Championships

Tarasova/Morozov took gold in both of their Grand Prix outings, entering the Grand Prix Final in joint first place with the reigning World champions Sui Wenjing / Han Cong. A personal best in the short program placed them a very close second to Aliona Savchenko / Bruno Massot, but a sixth-place result in the free skate dropped them to fifth overall, 2.10 points behind bronze medalists Megan Duhamel / Eric Radford. At the 2018 European Championships, they placed fifth in the short program, keeping them out of the final flight in the final segment. A personal best in the free skate allowed them to climb to first and win their second consecutive European title, leading a Russian sweep of the podium.

At the 2018 Winter Olympics in Pyeongchang, Tarasova/Morozov skated the short program portion of the team event, placing first over both Duhamel/Radford and Savchenko/Massot. This helped the Olympic Athletes of Russia to a silver medal. Their short program in the individual event put them in position for a possible gold medal, as they were second, less than a point out of the lead. However, skating last, they committed two major errors during the free skate and dropped out of the medals into fourth place. After the event, Morozov indicated that he felt that they had failed to control their nerves.

Tarasova/Morozov concluded their season at the 2018 World Championships in Milan. After placing second in both segments, they obtained the silver medal behind Savchenko/Massot. Following the result, Morozov commented: "We are happy tonight. We feel that it was hard and we're really tired. We are happy the season is over. It was a really long and hard season. I am just happy with what we could do today."

In May 2018, Mozer announced that she would take a break from coaching until September and that Maxim Trankov and Robin Szolkowy would serve as Tarasova/Morozov's coaches.

=== 2018–2019 season ===
Tarasova/Morozov started their season by competing at the 2018 CS Finlandia Trophy, where they won the gold medal. At their first Grand Prix assignment, 2018 Skate America, they placed first in both segments to win the gold medal. They outscored the silver medalists, their teammates Alisa Efimova / Alexander Korovin, by about 25 points. Tarasova said they were "happy that we’re halfway in the Final." In mid-November, they competed at the 2018 Rostelecom Cup, where they won their second Grand Prix gold medal of the season. Again they were ranked first in both programs and beat the silver medalist, Nicole Della Monica / Matteo Guarise, by about 17 points. With two gold medals, they qualified for the 2018–19 Grand Prix Final, where they won the bronze medal following errors in both the short program and free skate that saw them place third in both segments. Following the free skate, Morozov said that the performance had been "below average" but that "after a couple of simpler elements, we tuned back into the program, did a good throw, and managed the support well."

At the 2019 Russian Championships, Tarasova/Morozov led the short program, with Tarasova stepping out of the exit on the pairs spin, which she described as a "control issue." They also won the free skate, skating cleanly for the first time that season and securing their second national title. Morozov said, "we're happy with the result and with our performance. It was hard after the Final, but we managed."

Competing next at the 2019 European Championships, Tarasova/Morozov placed second in the short program, behind Vanessa James / Morgan Ciprès, after Tarasova underrotated her triple toe loop jump. They had returned to their acclaimed Rachmaninoff short program from the 2017–18 season for the remainder, at the insistence of their coaches, with Tarasova noting that it was "more powerful to skate." They placed second in the free skate, with Tarasova underrotating and stepping out of their three-jump combination, but otherwise without issues, and took the silver medal overall. Morozov said they were "obviously very disappointed by this defeat, by losing the gold medal. Like yesterday, the whole skate was good except one jump element. Without that, all the rest was good. We gave it away ourselves today."

At their final event of the season, the 2019 World Championships, Tarasova/Morozov led after the short program, setting a new world record. They came second in the free skate, being a returning Sui/Han, and won their second consecutive silver medal. Tarasova reflected on the event: "We skated both programs clean. There were some minor mistakes in our free program. It was difficult to skate today; I had to fight with myself. I managed to perform all the elements, and I was happy for that. To tell the truth, I felt the same as during the Olympics Games. I had some mistakes at the training session, and I felt rather the same. I managed to overcome my emotions and skate well."

=== 2019–2020 season ===
Following the end of the 2018–19 season, Tarasova and Morozov announced that they were moving to train in the United States under coach Marina Zoueva. Morozov later explained that they "went to Marina to work with her on what we were lacking."

In their first competition of the season, Tarasova/Morozov competed at the 2019 U.S. Classic. Errors in both programs, including an aborted lift in the free skate, caused them to finish second, behind American champions Cain-Gribble/LeDuc. Continuing onto the Grand Prix, their first assignment was 2019 Skate Canada International. Morozov popped their planned side-by-side triple toe loop in the short program, causing them to place third in that segment. In the free skate, Tarasova's popping a planned triple Salchow and then a failed lift kept them in third. Morozov deemed it "not the best performance of our team." At the 2019 Rostelecom Cup, competing for the second time against countrymen Boikova/Kozlovskii, the gold medalists at Skate Canada, Tarasova/Morozov were second in the short program after errors by Morozov on the side-by-side spins and the step sequence. Second in the free skate as well, they won the silver medal.

Tarasova/Morozov placed first in the short program at the 2020 Russian Championships, skating cleanly for the first time that season. Second in the free skate, with Tarasova doubling a planned triple jump, they lost the gold medal by 0.47 points. She called the result "a bit upsetting, but the result was to be expected after my mistake. The most important competitions are still to come."

In what would prove to be Tarasova/Morozov's final event of the season, they competed at the 2020 European Championships. After successfully landing their jumps and throw in the short program, Morozov stumbled in their lift, requiring them to abort it, and placed third in that segment. Tarasova remarked afterward, "I was not frightened — Vladimir held me tight. It’s an annoying nuisance." Second in the free program, they won the silver medal despite jump errors. They had been assigned to compete at the World Championships in Montreal, but they were cancelled as a result of the coronavirus pandemic.

=== 2020–2021 season ===
With the pandemic complicating international travel, Tarasova/Morozov had planned to compete in the first two stages of the domestic Russian Cup series before returning to the United States to train for Skate America. This plan was disrupted by Morozov's contracting COVID-19. Coach Maxim Trankov expressed hope that "the form is mild." On October 8, Trankov announced that Tarasova and Morozov would be skipping the Grand Prix series due to lack of training time and would be concentrating on the Russian Cup series. They did not appear at the senior Russian test skates in early September.

Tarasova/Morozov made their first competitive appearance at the fourth stage of the Russian Cup in Kazan, where they won the silver medal, finishing behind Mishina/Galliamov but ahead of Boikova/Kozlovskii. They were scheduled to appear in the fifth stage as well, but withdrew after Tarasova came down with pneumonia. It was revealed that Tarasova had contracted COVID-19 while attending the Kazan competition, precipitating pneumonia.

After recovery, Tarasova/Morozov had three weeks to prepare to compete at the 2021 Russian Championships. There they won the short program with a clean skate while the other top teams made errors. Winning the free skate as well, despite Tarasova falling on their final throw jump and an error on their pair spin, they reclaimed the Russian national title from Boikova/Kozlovskii. Morozov later remarked that they had "mixed feelings about our program" due to the late errors, but overall they were pleased by the progress they had made. They were assigned to compete at the 2021 World Championships in Stockholm.

Following the national championships, Tarasova/Morozov participated in the 2021 Channel One Trophy, a televised event organized in lieu of the cancelled European Championships. They were selected for the Red Machine team captained by Alina Zagitova. They placed first in both segments, and the Red Machine won the trophy. Tarasova/Morozov opted not to participate in the Russian Cup Final, instead competing at and winning the 2021 Challenge Cup in the Netherlands.

Going into the 2021 World Championships, Tarasova/Morozov were noted as one of the frontrunners for the podium in light of their resurgent season, alongside the other Russian teams and Sui/Han of China. In the short program, Tarasova had a major error on her planned triple jump that resulted in a downgrade, placing them fourth in that segment. She made a very similar error in the free skate and an error on a throw, which placed them third in that segment and fourth overall.

=== 2021–2022 season ===
In addition to coach Trankov, Tarasova/Morozov added established singles skating coaches Eteri Tutberidze, Sergei Dudakov, and Daniil Gleikhengauz to their coaching staff. They traveled to America for the Skating Club of Boston's Cranberry Cup event, winning the gold medal, before competing on the Challenger series at the 2021 CS Finlandia Trophy. They placed first in the short program but struggled in the free skate, placing second in that segment and dropping to the silver medal position behind domestic rivals and reigning World champions Mishina/Galliamov.

At their first Grand Prix series event of the season, the 2021 Skate America, Tarasova and Morozov skated a clean short program to place first in the segment. They retained their lead through the free skate despite struggles on their side-by-side jumps and took the gold medal overall ahead of Japanese competitors Miura/Kihara and domestic rivals Boikova/Kozlovskii. Morozov called the result "not perfect, but a good step for us." At their second event, the 2021 NHK Trophy, a series of errors in both the short and free skate lead to them finishing in second place behind Mishina/Galliamov. Morozov said they were "not able to give a good performance. We will continue to work." Their results qualified them to the Grand Prix Final, but it was subsequently cancelled due to restrictions prompted by the Omicron variant.

At the 2022 Russian Championships, Tarasova/Morozov botched a lift in the short program, placing third in that segment. Two errors in the free skate also had them third in that segment, taking the bronze medal overall.

Tarasova/Morozov placed second in the short program at the 2022 European Championships in Tallinn with a clean skate, 0.78 points behind Mishina/Galliamov. Tarasova stepped out of her opening triple Salchow attempt in the free, but otherwise, they skated without error and were second in that segment, winning the silver medal. Morozov opined that "it wasn't the best, and we could do more, but for today, it was good. We skated probably for our own pleasure once all the elements were over." On January 20, they were officially named to the Russian Olympic team.

Competing at the 2022 Winter Olympics in the pairs event, Tarasova/Morozov skated a clean short program to place second, 0.16 points behind segment leaders Sui/Han of China. Second in the free skate as well with a clean program, albeit with some tight jump landings, they won the silver medal with a total score 0.63 points behind gold medalists Sui/Han and 1.54 points ahead of bronze medalists Mishina/Galliamov. Tarasova spoke of the "happiness that everything worked at the right moment."

=== Retirement ===
Tarasova/Morozov announced their retirement from competitive figure skating on November 13, 2023.

== Programs ==
=== With Tarasova ===
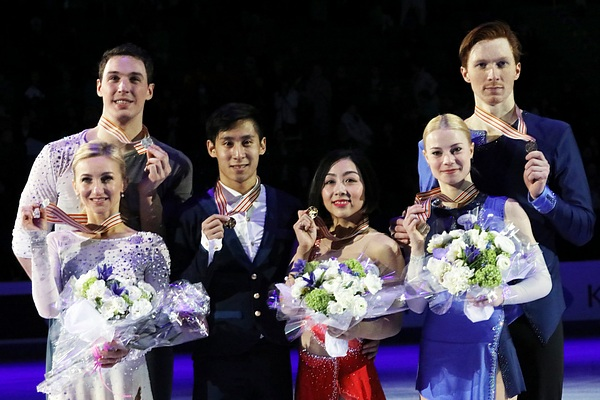
Tarasova and Morozov at the 2017 World Championships podium.

Season	Short program	Free skating	Exhibition
2022–2023	Ave Maria by Franz Schubert performed by Audiomachine	Lighthouse by Patrick Watson choreo. by Daniil Gleikhengauz	
2021–2022	Metamorphosis Two by Philip Glass; Experience by Ludovico Einaudi choreo. by Daniil Gleikhengauz; Clair de Lune by Claude Debussy choreo. by Daniil Gleikhengauz	Lighthouse by Patrick Watson choreo. by Daniil Gleikhengauz	My Heart Will Go On; (from Titanic) by Celine Dion choreo. by Daniil Gleikhengauz
2020–2021	Boléro by Maurice Ravel choreo. by Massimo Scali	Adagio in G minor by Tomaso Albinoni performed by Dimash Qudaibergen	My Heart Will Go On (from Titanic) by Celine Dion choreo. by Daniil Gleikhengauz; S.O.S d'un terrien en detresse by Grégory Lemarchal performed by Dimash Qudaibergen
2019–2020	Boléro by Maurice Ravel choreo. by Massimo Scali	Ti amo by Umberto Tozzi choreo. by Charlie White	
2018–2019	Piano Concerto No. 2 by Sergei Rachmaninoff; I Got You (I Feel Good) by James Brown	The Winter by Balmorhea	Why Don't You Do Right? by China Moses; Nobody Home performed by London Philharmonic Orchestra
2017–2018	Piano Concerto No. 2 by Sergei Rachmaninoff	Candyman by Christina Aguilera	How Long by Lionel Richie; Ordinary People by John Legend
2016–2017	Glam (Electro Swing Remix) by Dimie Cat	Music by John Miles	Ordinary People by John Legend
2015–2016	Lord of the Dance - Warriors by Ronan Hardiman choreo. by Alla Kapranova	Nocturne No.2 Op. 9–2 in E flat major; Prélude, Op. 28. No. 4; Prélude & Revolutionary Étude by Frédéric Chopin choreo. by Alla Kapranova	I Guess I Loved You by Lara Fabian
2014–2015	Sarabande Suite (Aeternae) by Globus choreo. by Maxim Trankov	Hello by Lionel Richie performed by London Symphony Orchestra choreo. by Maxim Trankov	I Guess I Loved You by Lara Fabian
2013–2014	El Tango de Roxanne (from Moulin Rouge!)	Aria by Johann Sebastian Bach; Four Seasons by Antonio Vivaldi; Aria by Johann Sebastian Bach	How Invigorating are the Evenings in Russia by Belyi Orel
2012–2013	Liquidation soundtrack by ?	Phantom of the Opera on Ice by Roberto Danova	

=== With Krutskikh ===
Season	Short program	Free skating
2011–2012	Cirque du Soleil	The Mask of Zorro by James Horner

== Competitive highlights ==
GP: Grand Prix; CS: Challenger Series; JGP: Junior Grand Prix

=== With Tarasova ===
International
Event	12–13	13–14	14–15	15–16	16–17	17–18	18–19	19–20	20–21	21–22	22–23
Olympics						4th				2nd	
Worlds			6th	5th	3rd	2nd	2nd	C	4th		
Europeans			3rd	3rd	1st	1st	2nd	2nd		2nd	
GP Final					1st	5th	3rd			C	
GP France				7th	2nd	1st					
GP NHK Trophy										2nd	
GP Rostelecom			2nd			1st	1st	2nd			
GP Skate America					3rd		1st		WD	1st	
GP Skate Canada			3rd	2nd				3rd			
CS Finlandia							1st			2nd	
CS Golden Spin				1st							
CS Nebelhorn			2nd			1st					
CS Nepela Trophy				3rd	1st						
CS U.S. Classic								2nd			
CS Warsaw Cup										1st	
Challenge Cup									1st		
Cranberry Cup										1st	
Universiade		2nd									
NRW Trophy	4th										
Warsaw Cup	1st										
International: Junior
Junior Worlds	5th	2nd									
JGP Final		4th									
JGP Croatia	5th										
JGP Estonia		3rd									
JGP Germany	WD										
JGP Latvia		2nd									
National
Russian Champ.	5th	8th	2nd	3rd	2nd	1st	1st	2nd	1st	3rd	3rd
Russian Junior	2nd	1st									
Russian Cup Final (Note: The 2023 Russian Cup Final was renamed as the 2023 Russian Grand Prix Final.)											3rd
GPR Golden Skate											2nd
GPR Idel											1st
Team events
Olympics						2nd T					
World Team Trophy					2nd T 2nd P						

=== With Krutskikh ===
International
Event	2011–12
JGP Estonia	8th
JGP Latvia	6th
Warsaw Cup	2nd J
National
Russian Junior Champ.	WD

=== With Moiseeva ===
International
Event	2007–08	2008–09	2009–10
NRW Trophy			1st J
Warsaw Cup			2nd J
Toruń Cup	2nd J	1st J	
National
Russian Junior Champ.			10th

== Detailed results ==
Small medals for short and free programs awarded only at ISU Championships. At team events, medals awarded for team results only.

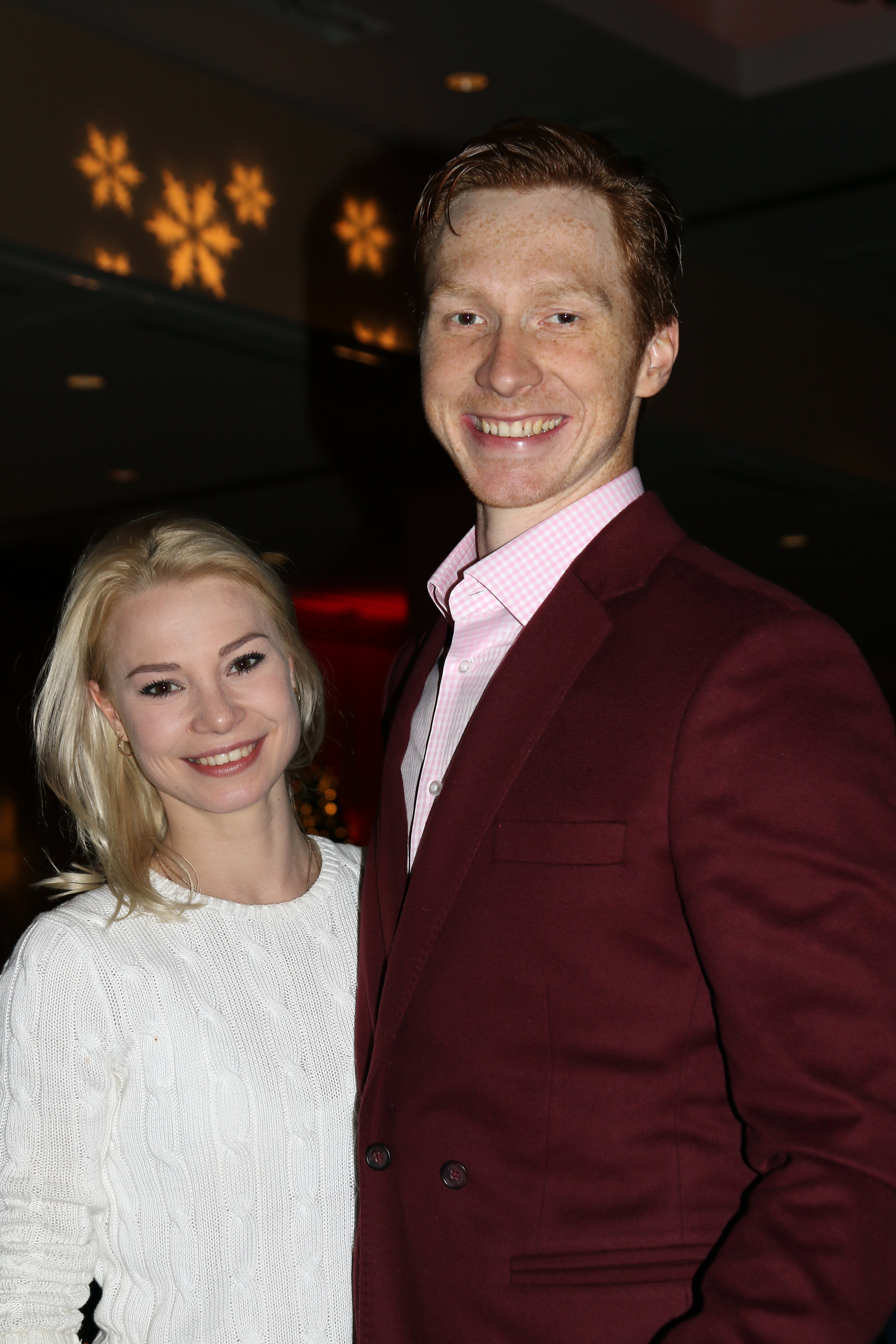
Tarasova and Morozov at the 2017–18 Grand Prix Final Banquet.

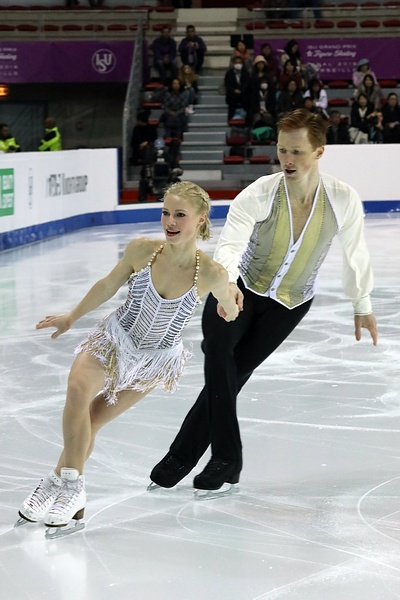
Tarasova and Morozov at the 2016–17 Grand Prix Final.

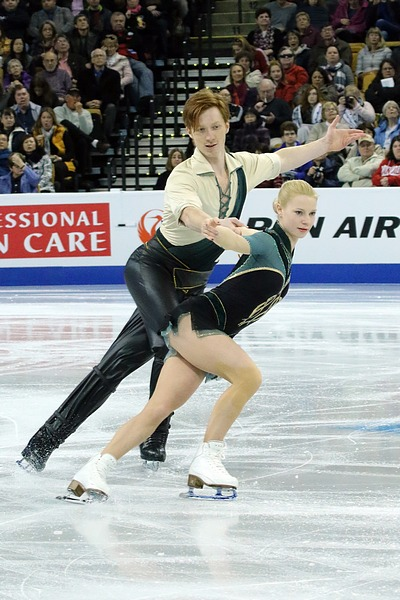
Tarasova and Morozov at the 2016 World Championships.

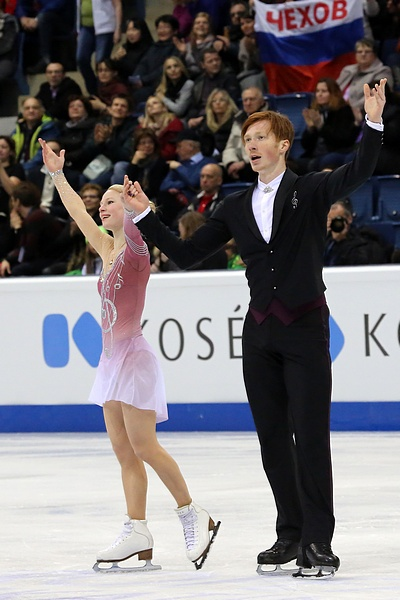
Tarasova and Morozov at the 2016 European Championships.

With Tarasova

2022–23 season
Date	Event	SP	FS	Total
20–26 December 2022	2023 Russian Championships	3; 81.23	3; 137.37	3; 218.60
4–7 November 2022	2022 Cup of Russia Series, 3rd Stage	1; 78.80	1; 157.56	1; 236.36
21–24 October 2022	2022 Cup of Russia Series, 1st Stage	1; 86.08	2; 134.99	2; 221.07
2021–22 season
Date	Event	SP	FS	Total
March 25–27, 2021	2022 Channel One Trophy	1; 86.36	3; 159.73	1T/3P; 246.09
February 18–19, 2022	2022 Winter Olympics	2; 84.25	2; 155.00	2; 239.25
January 10–16, 2022	2022 European Championships	2; 81.58	2; 154.85	2; 236.43
December 21–26, 2021	2022 Russian Championships	3; 78.68	3; 149.52	3; 228.20
November 17–20, 2021	2021 CS Warsaw Cup	1; 79.56	1; 148.73	1; 228.49
November 12–14, 2021	2021 NHK Trophy	2; 75.78	2; 137.49	2; 213.27
October 22–24, 2021	2021 Skate America	1; 80.36	1; 142.14	1; 222.50
October 7–10, 2021	2021 CS Finlandia Trophy	1; 78.33	2; 135.39	2; 213.72
August 14–16, 2021	2021 Cranberry Cup International	1; 75.97	1; 151.66	1; 227.63
2020–21 season
Date	Event	SP	FS	Total
March 22–28, 2021	2021 World Championships	4; 71.46	3; 141.30	4; 212.76
February 25–28, 2021	2021 Challenge Cup	1; 79.64	1; 138.21	1; 217.85
February 5–7, 2021	2021 Channel One Trophy	1; 83.61	1; 158.45	1T/1P; 242.06
December 23–27, 2020	2021 Russian Championships	1; 80.65	1; 147.58	1; 228.23
November 8–12, 2020	2020 Cup of Russia Series, 4th Stage, Kazan domestic competition	3; 78.72	2; 148.41	2; 227.13
October 23–24, 2020	2020 Skate America	WD	WD	WD
2019–20 season
Date	Event	SP	FS	Total
January 24–25, 2020	2020 European Championships	3; 73.50	2; 135.14	2; 208.64
December 24–29, 2019	2020 Russian Championships	1; 83.91	2; 149.28	2; 233.19
November 15–17, 2019	2019 Rostelecom Cup	2; 76.81	2; 139.96	2; 216.77
October 25–27, 2019	2019 Skate Canada	3; 73.57	3; 128.72	3; 202.29
September 17–22, 2019	2019 CS U.S. Classic	2; 74.85	2; 119.84	2; 194.69
2018–19 season
Date	Event	SP	FS	Total
March 18–24, 2019	2019 World Championships	1; 81.21	2; 147.26	2; 228.47
January 21–27, 2019	2019 European Championships	2; 73.90	2; 144.92	2; 218.82
December 19–23, 2018	2019 Russian Championships	1; 80.06	1; 156.74	1; 236.80
December 6–9, 2018	2018–19 Grand Prix Final	3; 74.04	3; 140.16	3; 214.20
November 16–18, 2018	2018 Rostelecom Cup	1; 78.47	1; 141.78	1; 220.25
October 19–21, 2018	2018 Skate America	1; 71.24	1; 133.61	1; 204.85
October 4–7, 2018	2018 CS Finlandia Trophy	1; 73.27	2; 125.71	1; 198.98
2017–18 season
Date	Event	SP	FS	Total
March 19–25, 2018	2018 World Championships	2; 81.29	2; 144.24	2; 225.53
February 14–25, 2018	2018 Winter Olympics	2; 81.68	4; 143.25	4; 224.93
February 9–12, 2018	2018 Winter Olympics (Team event)	1; 80.92	-	2
January 15–21, 2018	2018 European Championships	5; 70.37	1; 151.23	1; 221.60
December 21–24, 2017	2018 Russian Championships	2; 75.36	1; 147.98	1; 223.34
December 7–10, 2017	2017–18 Grand Prix Final	2; 78.83	6; 129.90	5; 208.73
November 17–19, 2017	2017 Internationaux de France	1; 77.84	2; 140.36	1; 218.20
October 20–22, 2017	2017 Rostelecom Cup	1; 76.88	1; 147.37	1; 224.25
September 27–30, 2017	2017 CS Nebelhorn Trophy	1; 77.52	1; 140.94	1; 218.46
2016–17 season
Date	Event	SP	FS	Total
April 20–23, 2017	2017 World Team Trophy	4; 66.37	2; 142.38	2T/2P; 208.75
Mar. 29 – Apr. 2, 2017	2017 World Championships	3; 79.37	4; 139.66	3; 219.03
January 25–29, 2017	2017 European Championships	1; 80.82	2; 146.76	1; 227.58
December 20–26, 2016	2017 Russian Championships	1; 80.04	2; 139.15	2; 219.19
December 8–11, 2016	2016–17 Grand Prix Final	1; 78.60	1; 135.25	1; 213.85
November 11–13, 2016	2016 Trophée de France	2; 76.24	3; 130.70	2; 206.94
October 21–23, 2016	2016 Skate America	1; 75.24	5; 110.70	3; 185.94
Sept. 30 – Oct. 2, 2016	2016 CS Ondrej Nepela Memorial	1; 69.06	1; 128.74	1; 197.80
2015–16 season
Date	Event	SP	FS	Total
Mar. 28 – Apr. 3, 2016	2016 World Championships	6; 72.00	5; 134.27	5; 206.27
January 26–31, 2016	2016 European Championships	3; 70.17	2; 127.38	3; 197.55
December 23–27, 2015	2016 Russian Championships	3; 77.21	3; 140.31	3; 217.52
December 2–5, 2015	2015 CS Golden Spin of Zagreb	1; 73.06	2; 119.16	1; 192.22
November 13–15, 2015	2015 Trophée Éric Bompard	7; 62.32	—	7; 62.32
Oct. 30 – Nov. 1, 2015	2015 Skate Canada International	2; 64.00	2; 127.19	2; 191.19
October 1–3, 2015	2015 CS Ondrej Nepela Trophy	1; 66.94	3; 117.34	3; 184.28
2014–15 season
Date	Event	SP	FS	Total
March 23–29, 2015	2015 World Championships	6; 67.71	5; 130.75	6; 198.46
Jan. 26 – Feb. 1, 2015	2015 European Championships	5; 57.13	3; 125.89	3; 183.02
December 24–28, 2014	2015 Russian Championships	3; 70.29	1; 137.94	2; 208.23
November 14–15, 2014	2014 Rostelecom Cup	2; 67.28	5; 106.50	2; 173.78
Oct. 31 – Nov. 2, 2014	2014 Skate Canada	3; 64.14	3; 111.31	3; 175.45
September 25–27, 2014	2014 CS Nebelhorn Trophy	2; 65.74	2; 113.24	2; 178.98

=== Junior results ===
2013–14 season
Date	Event	Level	SP	FS	Total
March 10–16, 2014	2014 World Junior Championships	Junior	2; 59.46	2; 108.74	2; 168.20
January 23–25, 2014	2014 Russian Junior Championships	Junior	1; 66.06	1; 120.25	1; 186.31
December 24–27, 2013	2014 Russian Championships	Senior	3; 69.72	10; 99.34	8; 169.06
December 11–15, 2013	2013 Winter Universiade	Senior	2; 64.87	2; 112.05	2; 176.92
December 5–6, 2013	2013–14 JGP Final	Junior	4; 54.91	4; 97.10	4; 152.01
October 10–12, 2013	2013 JGP Estonia	Junior	3; 57.99	3; 98.70	3; 156.69
August 29–30, 2013	2013 JGP Latvia	Junior	2; 52.96	1; 104.86	2; 157.82
2012–13 season
Date	Event	Level	SP	FS	Total
March 1–2, 2013	2013 World Junior Championships	Junior	4; 52.25	6; 96.49	5; 148.74
February 2–3, 2013	2013 Russian Junior Championships	Junior	1; 60.23	3; 111.24	2; 171.47
December 25–28, 2012	2013 Russian Championships	Senior	8; 52.93	5; 111.36	5; 164.29
December 5–9, 2012	2012 NRW Trophy	Senior	4; 55.81	4; 94.60	4; 150.41
November 15–18, 2012	2012 Warsaw Cup	Senior	1; 56.42	1; 104.91	1; 161.33
October 3–6, 2012	2012 JGP Croatia	Junior	1; 51.89	5; 85.40	5; 137.29
