= Fedor Klimov =

Russian pair skater (born 1990)

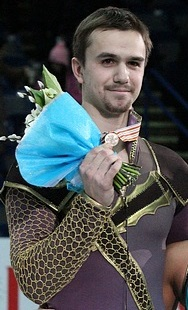
- Klimov at the 2012 European Championships

Personal information
- Native name: Фёдор Александрович Климов
- Full name: Fedor Alexandrovich Klimov
- Other names: Fyodor Klimov
- Born: 7 September 1990 (age 36) Leningrad, Russian SFSR, Soviet Union
- Height: 1.81 m (5 ft 11 in)

Figure skating career
- Country: Russia
- Partner: Ksenia Stolbova
- Coach: Nina Mozer, Vladislav Zhovnirski
- Skating club: SDUSHOR St. Petersburg
- Began skating: 1994
- Retired: 5 September 2018
Medal record
Representing Russia
Figure skating: Pairs
Olympic Games
Gold medal – first place	2014 Sochi	Team
Silver medal – second place	2014 Sochi	Pairs
World Championships
Silver medal – second place	2014 Saitama	Pairs
European Championships
Silver medal – second place	2014 Budapest	Pairs
Silver medal – second place	2015 Stockholm	Pairs
Silver medal – second place	2018 Moscow	Pairs
Bronze medal – third place	2012 Sheffield	Pairs
Grand Prix Final
Gold medal – first place	2015–16 Barcelona	Pairs
Silver medal – second place	2014–15 Barcelona	Pairs
Winter Universiade
Gold medal – first place	2013 Trentino	Pairs
World Junior Championships
Silver medal – second place	2011 Gangneung	Pairs
Bronze medal – third place	2010 The Hague	Pairs
Junior Grand Prix Final
Silver medal – second place	2010–11 Beijing	Pairs

Fedor Alexandrovich Klimov (Russian: Фёдор Александрович Климов; born 7 September 1990) is a retired Russian pair skater. With partner Ksenia Stolbova, he is the 2014 Olympic silver medalist, the 2014 Olympic champion in the team event, the 2014 World silver medalist, a three-time European medalist (2012 bronze, 2014, 2015 silver), the 2015–16 Grand Prix Final champion, the 2013 Winter Universiade champion, a two-time World Junior medalist (2010 bronze, 2011 silver), and a three-time Russian national champion (2014, 2015, 2017).

== Personal life ==
Fedor Alexandrovich Klimov was born on 7 September 1990 in Leningrad (now Saint Petersburg), Russian SFSR, Soviet Union. He attended the Lesgaft Academy of Physical Education in Saint Petersburg.

On 17 June 2022 he married 2022 Olympic silver medalist pair skater, Evgenia Tarasova. The couple welcomed a daughter in October 2025.

== Career ==
=== Early career ===
Klimov began skating due to his mother who is a coach at the Figure Skating Academy in Saint Petersburg. He placed 9th in men's singles at the 2007 Russian Junior Championships.

Although initially not interested in pair skating, he made the switch on his coach's advice when he was 16. His coach, Natalia Golubeva, paired him with Maria Chashina, who was also switching from singles.

Klimov and his next partner, Alexandra Malakhova, placed 8th at the Russian Junior Championships in January 2009.

=== 2009–11 ===
In spring 2009, coach Ludmila Velikova partnered Klimov with Ksenia Stolbova. They trained in Saint Petersburg.

During their first season together, the pair placed 2nd and 7th at their two Junior Grand Prix events, and 7th at the Final. The pair won the Russian Junior title and then bronze at Junior Worlds in 2010.

During the 2010–11 season, Stolbova/Klimov won both of their JGP events and qualified for the JGP Final. They also debuted on the senior GP circuit, finishing 5th at Skate America. They won silver at the Junior Grand Prix Final. At the 2011 Russian Championships, Stolbova/Klimov finished sixth overall in their senior national debut and won their second junior national title. They were the silver medalists at the 2011 World Junior Championships.

=== 2011–12 season ===
For the Grand Prix season, Stolbova/Klimov were assigned to 2011 Trophée Eric Bompard, where they finished 7th, and 2011 Cup of Russia, where they finished 4th. Third in the short program and second in the long at the 2012 Russian Championships, the pair won their first senior national medal, silver.

Stolbova/Klimov were originally the first alternates for the 2012 European Championships but Alexander Smirnov had an emergency surgery and was not able to recover in time. Replacing Kavaguti/Smirnov at the event, Stolbova/Klimov set new personal bests in their short and long program to win their first European medal, bronze.

=== 2012–13 season ===
For the 2012–13 season, Stolbova/Klimov worked on upgrading their twist to a triple. They began their international season at the 2012 Coupe de Nice, where they took the silver. Stolbova/Klimov won their first senior Grand Prix medal, bronze, at the 2012 Cup of China, and finished 5th at the 2012 Trophée Eric Bompard. They won the bronze medal at the 2013 Russian Championships.

First alternates for the 2013 European Championships, Stolbova/Klimov were called up to replace Vera Bazarova / Yuri Larionov who withdrew due to Larionov's wrist injury. After finishing sixth at Europeans in Zagreb, they won their first senior international title at the 2013 Bavarian Open. In April 2013, the pair said they wanted to move to Moscow to work with Nina Mozer, who agreed to take them in her group. The move was opposed by Oleg Nilov, the head of the Saint Petersburg skating association, arguing against a concentration of skaters in Moscow, but was authorized by the Russian skating federation.

After relocating to Moscow, the pair focused on improving their basic skating skills. Their training was interrupted when Klimov fell off a bicycle in late May 2013, resulting in a broken leg.

=== 2013–14 season ===
In 2013–14, Stolbova/Klimov started their Grand Prix season with a bronze medal at the 2013 Skate America. After placing sixth in the short program and third in the free skate, they finished fourth overall at the 2013 Cup of Russia behind Canadian pair Kirsten Moore-Towers / Dylan Moscovitch. Stolbova/Klimov won the gold medal at the 2013 Winter Universiade in Trentino, Italy and then took their first national title at the 2014 Russian Championships, scoring 0.45 more than the 2012 national champions, Bazarova/Larionov.

At the 2014 European Championships, Stolbova/Klimov placed fourth in the short, first in the free skate, and scored a total of 207.98 points to win the silver medal behind Volosozhar/Trankov and ahead of Bazarova/Larionov. All three pairs were sent to the 2014 Winter Olympics. Assigned to the free skate in the inaugural Olympic team event, Stolbova/Klimov placed first in their segment and Team Russia went on to win the gold medal. In the pairs event, Stolbova/Klimov placed third in the short and advanced to second after the free skate with an overall score of 218.68 points. They won the silver medal ahead of four-time World champions Aliona Savchenko / Robin Szolkowy who took the bronze medal. Stolbova/Klimov won the silver medal in their first appearance at the 2014 World Championships.

=== 2014–15 season ===
In the 2014–15 season, Stolbova/Klimov won both of their Grand Prix events, the 2014 Rostelecom Cup and 2014 Trophee Eric Bompard, and took silver at the Grand Prix Final behind Canada's Meagan Duhamel / Eric Radford. They won their second consecutive national title at the 2015 Russian Championships and went on to win silver at the 2015 European Championships behind Kavaguti/Smirnov.

Stolbova/Klimov decided not to compete at the 2015 World Championships in Shanghai, China, as they wanted to focus on learning new throw jumps.

=== 2015–16 season ===
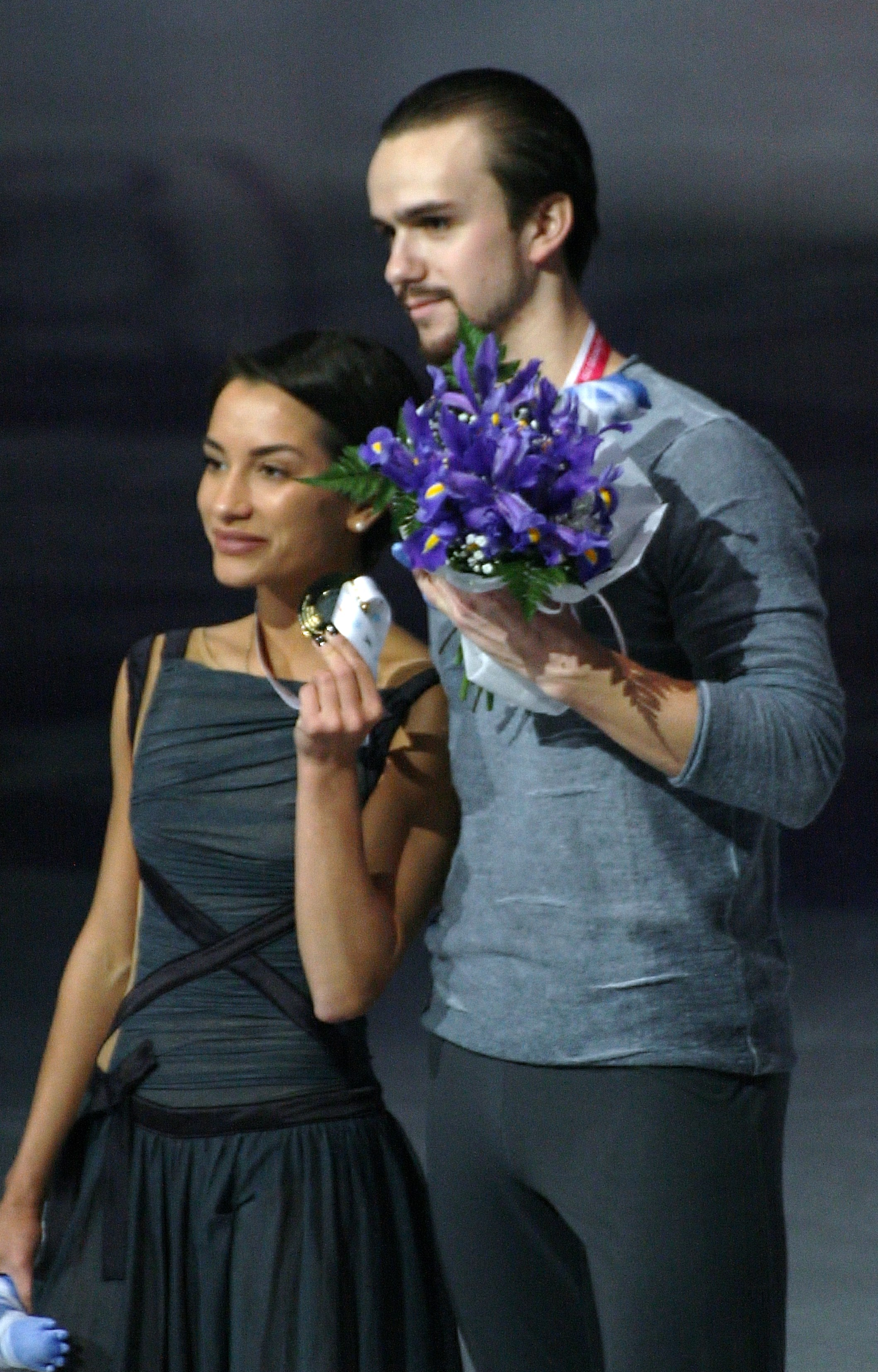
Stolbova/Klimov at the 2015–16 Grand Prix Final

Stolbova/Klimov started the 2015–16 season competing in a challenger series at the 2015 Ondrej Nepela Trophy where they won the gold medal. They competed in their first Grand Prix of the season at the 2015 Skate America finishing 4th place. However, they polished their program and elements and won the gold medal in their second Grand Prix at the 2015 Rostelecom Cup ahead of teammates Yuko Kavaguti / Alexander Smirnov. They qualified for the 2015–16 Grand Prix Final in Barcelona where they placed first in both segments in pairs short program and in the free skate where they scored 154.60 points, just 0.06 lower than the free skate World record achieved by compatriots Tatiana Volosozhar / Maxim Trankov at the 2013 Skate America. Stolbova/Klimov landed clean side-by-side 3T-3T-2T jumps, as well as 3 Flip, 3 Salchow throws in their free skate. They won the gold medal with a total of 229.44 points.

Stolbova/Klimov withdrew from the entry list at the 2016 Russian Championships due to Klimov's allergic reaction from a therapeutic massage a week before nationals. They were selected to compete at the 2016 European Championships but withdrew before the event. A nerve problem affected Klimov's arm and shoulder muscles, preventing him from performing lifts.

At the 2016 World Championships in Boston, the pair placed 5th in the short program, 4th in the free skate, and 4th overall.

=== 2016–17 season ===
During a training camp in mid-July 2016, Stolbova developed severe inflammation in her left ankle due to a nerve problem. She and Klimov withdrew from both of their Grand Prix assignments – the 2016 Rostelecom Cup and 2016 NHK Trophy. They returned to competition in late December, winning gold at the 2017 Russian Championships by a margin of 0.93 over Evgenia Tarasova / Vladimir Morozov.

In January 2017 they competed at the 2017 European Championships where they placed 4th after placing 4th in both the short program and the free skate. Two months later they competed at the 2017 World Championships where they placed 5th after placing only 13th in the short program but 3rd in the free skate.

=== 2017–18 season ===
In the Grand Prix season they won two silvers, first at the 2017 Rostelecom Cup and then at the 2017 NHK Trophy. These results qualified them to the 2017–18 Grand Prix Final where they placed 4th. They then won another pair of silver medals, first at the 2018 Russian Championships and then at the 2018 European Championships. They weren't sent to the 2018 Winter Olympics because it was announced by the Russian Figure Skating Federation on 23 January 2018 that Stolbova wasn't invited to the 2018 Olympics. They later withdrew from the 2018 World Championships.

On 5 September 2018, Klimov visited the Russian Figure Skating Federation and signed his retirement document officially.

== Post-competitive career ==
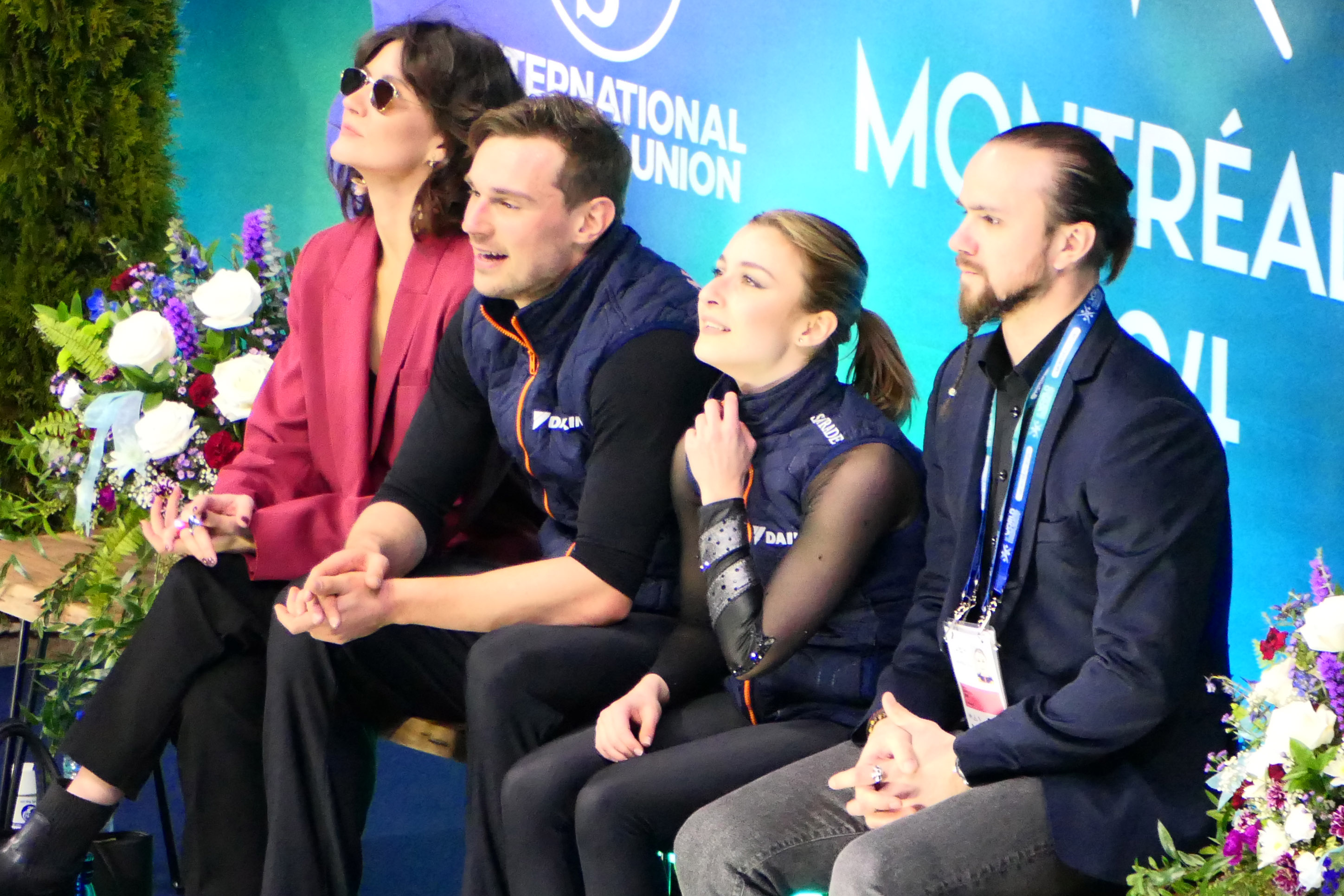
Klimov (far right) with students, Daria Danilova / Michel Tsiba, at the 2024 World Championships

Following his retirement from competitive figure skating, Klimov began coaching alongside his former coach, Nina Mozer in Moscow. In early 2021, he moved to Sochi, where he now teaches alongside Dmitri Savin.

His current and former students include:

- (Russia) (Armenia) Karina Akopova / Nikita Rakmanin
- (Philippines) Isabella Gamez / Aleksandr Korovin
- (Hungary) Ioulia Chtchetinina / Márk Magyar
- (Netherlands) Daria Danilova / Michel Tsiba
- (Germany) Minerva Fabienne Hase / Nolan Seegert
- (Spain) Brooke McIntosh / Marco Zandron
- (Japan) Yuna Nagaoka / Sumitada Moriguchi
- (Hungary) Maria Pavlova / Balázs Nagy
- (Hungary) Maria Pavlova / Alexei Sviatchenko

== Programs ==
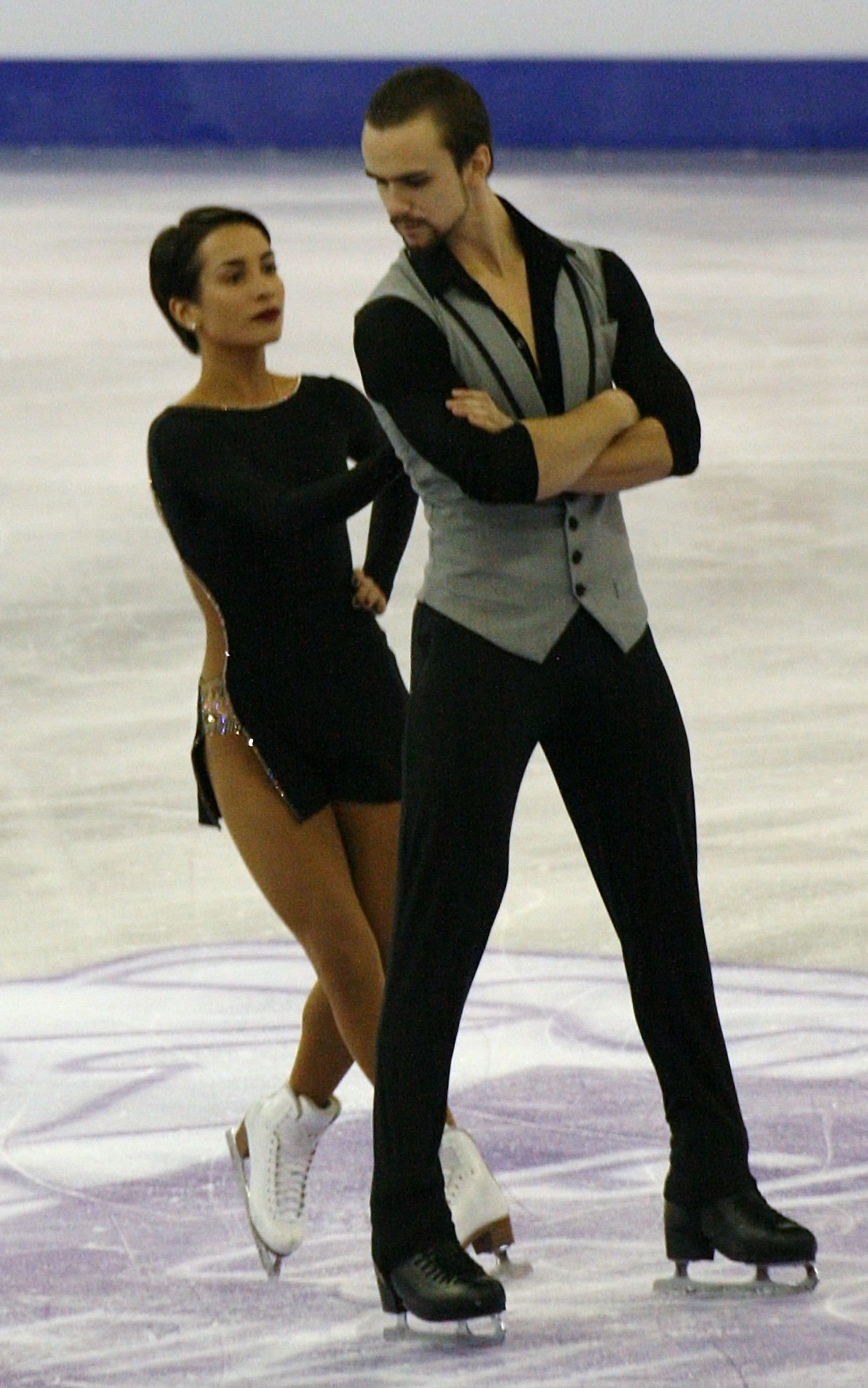
Stolbova/Klimov at the 2015–16 Grand Prix Final

(with Stolbova)

Season	Short program	Free skating	Exhibition
2017–18	Tango de Besame performed by Benise	Carmen Suite	Please Don't Stop the Rain by James Morrison
2016–17	Clair de Lune by Claude Debussy choreo. by Yuri Smekalov	Après la pluie; Pomeriggio; Lied guitare by René Aubry choreo. by Nikolai Morozov, Yuri Smekalov	Eine kleine Nachtmusik by W. A. Mozart
2015–16	I Put a Spell on You performed by Annie Lennox	Man and Shadow (from The Unknown Known) by Danny Elfman	Hello by Adele; Memories of Sochi; Losing by Marc Sway
2014–15	Crouching Tiger, Hidden Dragon by Tan Dun; House of Flying Daggers by Shigeru Umebayashi	Notre-Dame de Paris by Riccardo Cocciante; Tu vas me Détruire performed by Daniel Lavoie; Bohémienne performed by Hélène Ségara; Danse, Mon Esmeralda performed by Garou	Losing by Marc Sway; Memories of Sochi; Strange Birds by Birdy
2013–14	Surrender by Jesse Cook	The Addams Family by Marc Shaiman	Laugh, I Nearly Died by The Rolling Stones; La Strada by Nino Rota
2012–13	Interview with the Vampire by Elliot Goldenthal	The Addams Family by Marc Shaiman	Clair de Lune by Claude Debussy
2011–12	Boléro by Maurice Ravel	Polovtsian Dances by Alexander Borodin	La Strada by Nino Rota
2010–11	Asturias by Isaac Albéniz	La Strada soundtrack by Nino Rota	Clair de Lune by Claude Debussy
2009–10	Russian Fantasy by unknown	Oriental Fantasy by unknown	

== Competitive highlights ==
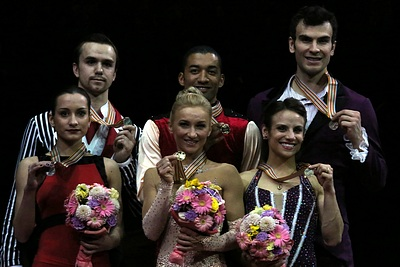
Stolbova/Klimov at the 2014 World Championships podium

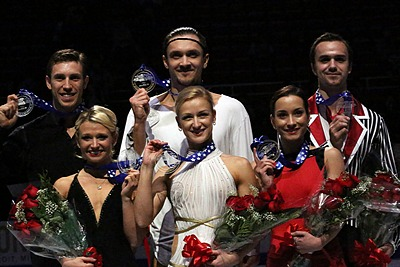
Stolbova/Klimov at the 2013 Skate America

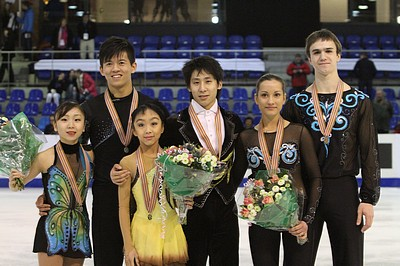
Stolbova/Klimov at the 2010 World Junior Championships

GP: Grand Prix; CS: Challenger Series; JGP: Junior Grand Prix

=== With Stolbova ===
International
Event	09–10	10–11	11–12	12–13	13–14	14–15	15–16	16–17	17–18	18–19
Olympics					2nd					
Worlds					2nd		4th	5th	WD	
Europeans			3rd	6th	2nd	2nd	WD	4th	2nd	
GP Final						2nd	1st		4th	
GP Bompard			7th	5th		1st				
GP Cup of China				3rd						
GP NHK Trophy								WD	2nd	
GP Rostelecom			4th		4th	1st	1st	WD	2nd	
GP Skate America		5th			3rd		4th			
CS Finlandia Trophy									3rd	
CS Nepela Trophy							1st			
Universiade					1st					
Bavarian Open				1st						
Cup of Nice				2nd						
Warsaw Cup					1st					
International: Junior
Event	09–10	10–11	11–12	12–13	13–14	14–15	15–16	16–17	17–18	18–19
Junior Worlds	3rd	2nd								
JGP Final	7th	2nd								
JGP Austria		1st								
JGP Belarus	7th									
JGP U.K.		1st								
JGP U.S.	2nd									
National
Russian Champ.		6th	2nd	3rd	1st	1st		1st	2nd	
Russian Jr. Champ.	1st	1st								
Team events
Olympics					1st T 1st P					
Team Challenge; Cup							2nd T 2nd P			
TBD = Assigned; WD = Withdrew

=== With Malakhova ===
National
Event	2008–09
Russian Junior Championships	8th

=== Men's singles ===
National
Event	2006–07
Russian Junior Championships	9th

== Detailed results ==
Small medals for short and free programs awarded only at ISU Championships. At team events, medals awarded for team results only.

=== 2011–2012 to present ===
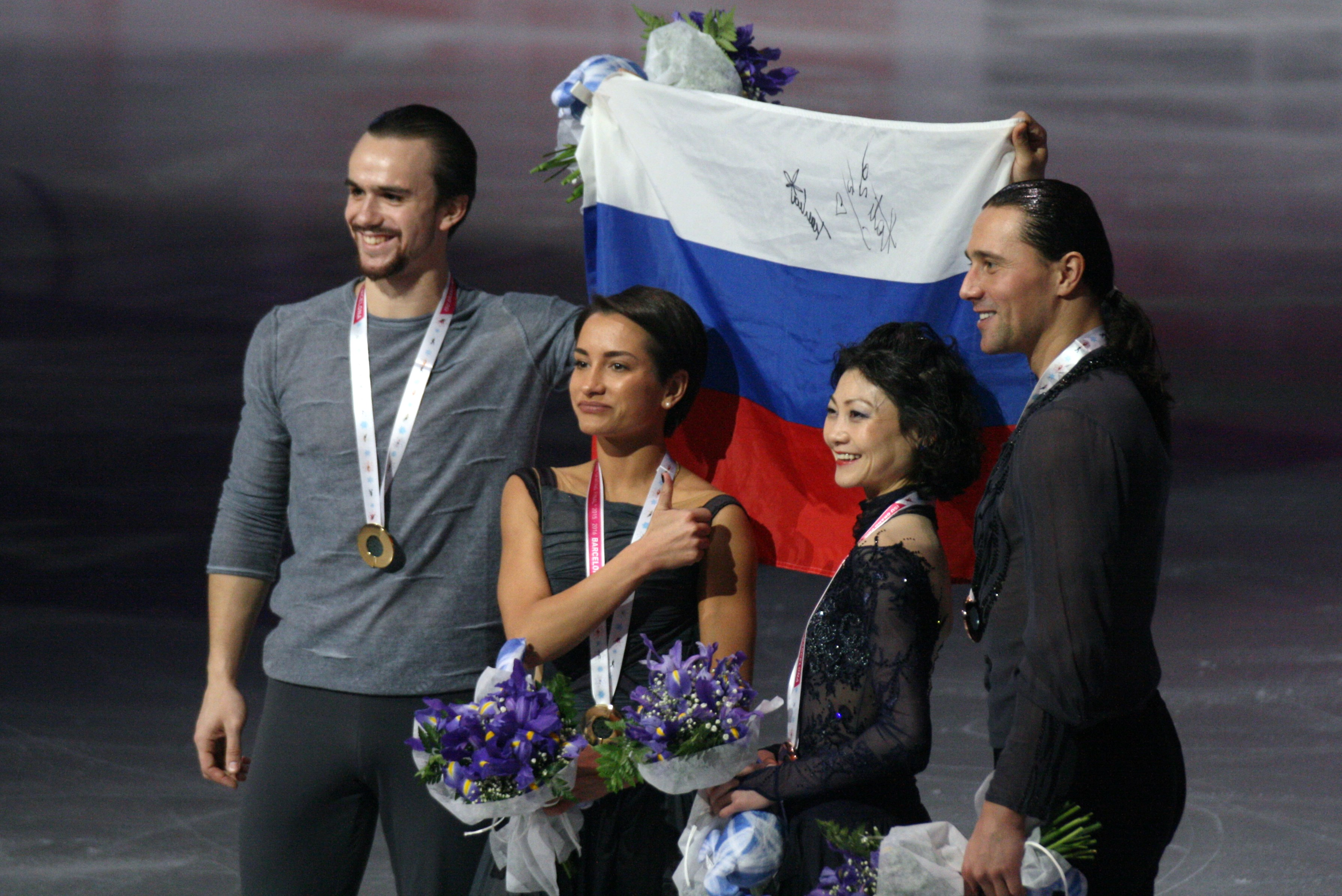
Stolbova/Klimov at the 2015–16 Grand Prix Final pairs podium

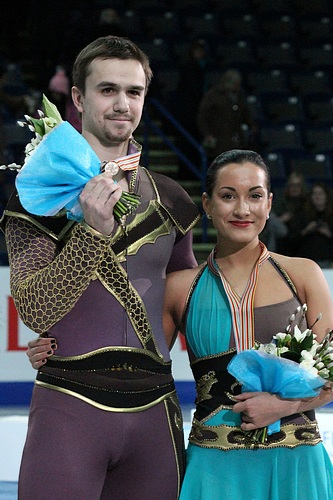
Stolbova/Klimov at the 2012 European Championships

2017–18 season
Date	Event	SP	FS	Total
15–21 January 2018	2018 European Championships	3; 72.05	2; 138.96	2; 211.01
21–24 December 2017	2018 Russian Championships	1; 76.32	2; 139.23	2; 215.55
7–10 December 2017	2017–18 Grand Prix Final	4; 73.15	4; 136.11	4; 209.26
10–12 November 2017	2017 NHK Trophy	2; 75.05	2; 147.69	2; 222.74
20–22 October 2017	2017 Rostelecom Cup	2; 71.39	2; 133.04	2; 204.43
6–8 October 2017	2017 CS Finlandia Trophy	2; 70.12	4; 114.66	3; 184.78
2016–17 season
Date	Event	SP	FS	Total
29 March – 2 April 2017	2017 World Championships	13; 65.69	3; 141.03	5; 206.72
25–29 January 2017	2017 European Championships	4; 73.70	4; 142.81	4; 216.51
20–26 December 2016	2017 Russian Championships	2; 77.47	1; 142.65	1; 220.12
2015–16 season
Date	Event	SP	FS	Total
22–24 April 2016	2016 Team Challenge Cup		2; 130.46	2^{T}
28 March – 3 April 2016	2016 World Championships	5; 73.98	4; 140.50	4; 214.48
10–13 December 2015	2015–16 Grand Prix Final	1; 74.84	1; 154.60	1; 229.44
20–22 November 2015	2015 Rostelecom Cup	1; 75.45	1; 139.25	1; 214.70
23–25 October 2015	2015 Skate America	5; 63.41	2; 125.65	4; 189.06
1–3 October 2015	2015 Ondrej Nepela Trophy	2; 66.10	2; 124.18	1; 190.28
2014–15 season
Date	Event	SP	FS	Total
26 January – 1 February 2015	2015 European Championships	1; 71.38	2; 129.73	2; 201.11
24–28 December 2014	2015 Russian Championships	1; 75.72	2; 136.38	1; 212.10
11–14 December 2014	2014–15 Grand Prix Final	2; 72.33	2; 141.39	2; 213.72
21–23 November 2014	2014 Trophée Éric Bompard	1; 71.20	1; 138.61	1; 209.81
14–16 November 2014	2014 Cup of Russia	1; 69.09	1; 142.88	1; 211.97
2013–14 season
Date	Event	SP	FS	Total
24–30 March 2014	2014 World Championships	3; 76.15	2; 139.77	2; 215.92
6–22 February 2014	2014 Winter Olympics	3; 75.21	2; 143.47	2; 218.68
6–22 February 2014	2014 Winter Olympics (Team Event)		1; 135.09	1
15–19 January 2014	2014 European Championships	4; 70.90	1; 137.08	2; 207.98
24–27 December 2013	2014 Russian Championships	1; 75.55	2; 138.92	1; 214.47
11–15 December 2013	2013 Winter Universiade	1; 70.01	1; 128.86	1; 198.87
22–24 November 2013	2013 Cup of Russia	6; 57.20	3; 130.90	4; 188.10
13–17 November 2013	2013 Warsaw Cup	1; 64.64	1; 128.27	1; 192.91
18–20 October 2013	2013 Skate America	3; 64.80	3; 122.55	3; 187.35
2012–2013 season
Date	Event	SP	FS	Total
6–11 February 2013	2013 Bavarian Open	1; 59.84	1; 123.03	1; 182.87
23–27 January 2013	2013 European Championships	8; 53.70	6; 113.53	6; 167.23
25–28 December 2012	2013 Russian Championships	3; 67.78	3; 127.68	3; 195.46
15–18 November 2012	2012 Trophée Éric Bompard	5; 53.64	3; 113.09	5; 166.73
2–4 November 2012	2012 Cup of China	5; 56.66	3; 115.89	3; 172.55
24–28 October 2012	2012 Cup of Nice	3; 48.32	1; 106.72	2; 155.04
2011–2012 season
Date	Event	SP	FS	Total
23–29 January 2012	2012 Europeans Championships	3; 58.66	3; 113.15	3; 171.81
25–29 December 2011	2012 Russian Championships	3; 58.46	2; 123.67	2; 182.13
24–27 November 2011	2011 Cup of Russia	4; 51.73	5; 97.93	4; 149.66
18–20 November 2011	2011 Trophée Eric Bompard	7; 48.81	8; 88.25	7; 137.06

=== 2009–2010 to 2010–2011 ===
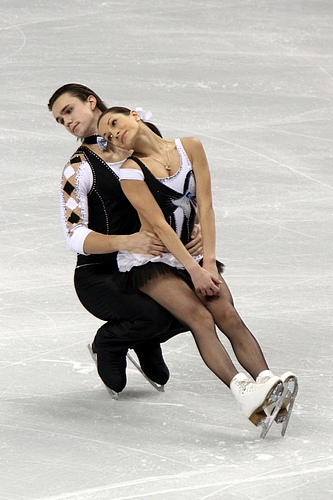
Stolbova/Klimov at the 2010 Skate America

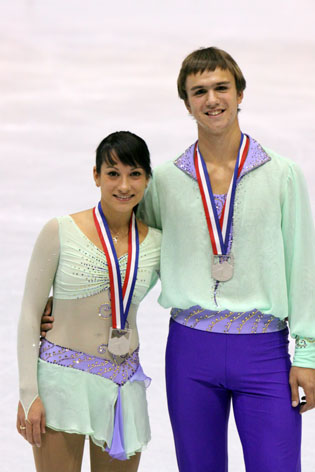
Stolbova/Klimov at the 2009 JGP Lake Placid

2010–2011 season
Date	Event	Level	SP	FS	Total
28 February – 6 March 2011	2011 World Junior Championships	Junior	3; 54.21	2; 105.39	2; 159.60
2–4 February 2011	2011 Russian Junior Championships	Junior	1; 62.63	1; 115.33	1; 177.96
26–29 December 2010	2011 Russian Championships	Senior	5; 61.03	6; 107.05	6; 168.08
8–12 December 2010	2010–11 Junior Grand Prix Final	Junior	2; 49.63	2; 100.91	2; 150.54
11–14 November 2010	2010 Skate America	Senior	5; 53.73	6; 105.76	5; 159.49
29 September – 3 October 2010	2010 Junior Grand Prix UK	Junior	1; 54.17	2; 97.47	1; 151.64
15–19 September 2010	2010 Junior Grand Prix Austria	Junior	1; 54.30	1; 105.49	1; 159.79
2010–2011 season
Date	Event	Level	SP	FS	Total
9–13 March 2010	2010 World Junior Championships	Junior	3; 54.26	3; 91.09	3; 145.35
3–6 February 2010	2010 Russian Junior Championships	Junior	1; 60.04	1; 107.14	1; 167.18
2–6 December 2009	2009–10 Junior Grand Prix Final	Junior	3; 48.90	8; 73.29	7; 122.19
23–27 September 2009	2009 Junior Grand Prix Belarus	Junior	2; 49.52	8; 74.48	7; 124.00
2–6 September 2009	2010 Junior Grand Prix U.S.	Junior	2; 47.53	5; 81.97	2; 129.50
