= Figure skating at the 2013 Winter Universiade – Pairs =

Figure skating at the 2013 Winter Universiade included a pairs event for senior level skaters. The short program was held on December 12 and the free skating on December 13, 2013.

== Results ==
Rank	Name	Nation	Total points	SP		FS	
1	Ksenia Stolbova / Fedor Klimov	Russia	198.87	1	70.01	1	128.86
2	Evgenia Tarasova / Vladimir Morozov	Russia	176.92	2	64.87	2	112.05
3	Nicole Della Monica / Matteo Guarise	Italy	160.95	3	56.21	3	104.74
4	Natalia Mitina / Yuri Shevchuk	Russia	143.93	4	55.38	4	88.55
5	Miriam Ziegler / Severin Kiefer	Austria	126.56	5	46.39	5	80.17

== Panel of Judges ==
Function	Name	Nation
Referee	Massimo Orlandini	ISU
Technical Controller	Vera Tauchmanova	ISU
Technical Specialist	Igor Bich	ISU
Assistant Technical Specialist	Evelyn Rossoukhi-Schneider	ISU
Judge	Karol Pescosta	Italy
Judge	Ayumi Kozuka	Japan
Judge	Chen Weiguang	China
Judge	Igor Dolgushin	Russia
Judge	Irina Medvedeva	Ukraine
Data Operator	Maria Baekgaard Kjaer	ISU
Replay Operator	Flavia Graglia	ISU
