= Matteo Guarise =

Italian figure skater (born 1988)

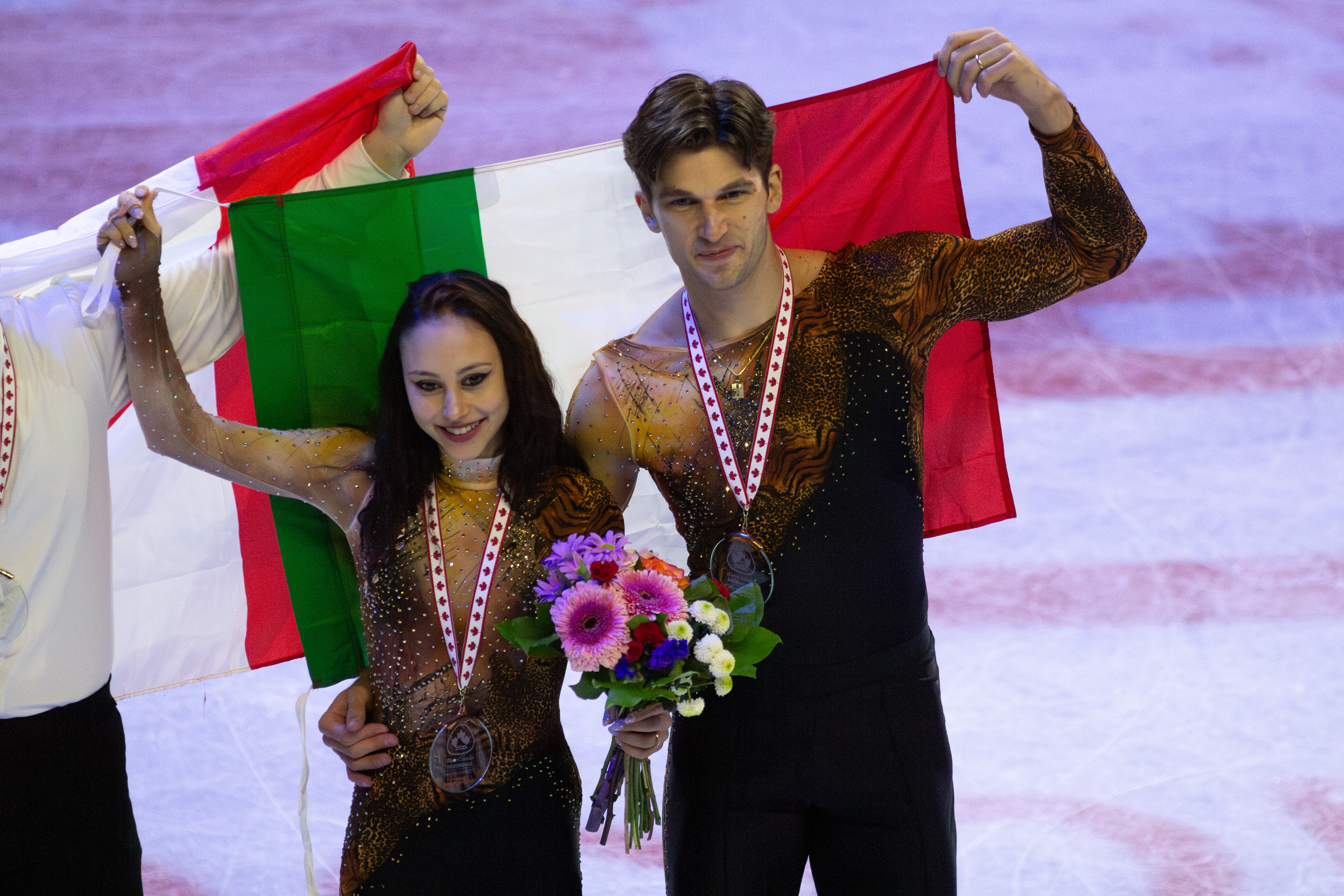
- Lucrezia Beccari and Matteo Guarise at the 2023 Skate Canada International

Personal information
- Born: 15 September 1988 (age 38) Rimini, Italy
- Height: 1.82 m (6 ft 0 in)

Figure skating career
- Country: Italy
- Discipline: Pair skating
- Partner: Lucrezia Beccari (since 2022); Nicole Della Monica (2011–22)
- Coach: Luca Demattè; Rosanna Murante
- Skating club: G.S. Fiamme Oro Moena
- Began skating: 2010

Medal record
Event	Gold medal – first place	Silver medal – second place	Bronze medal – third place
European Championships	1	0	0
Italian Championships	7	4	1
Medal list
European Championships
Gold medal – first place	2024 Kaunas	Pairs
Italian Championships
Gold medal – first place	2016 Turin	Pairs
Gold medal – first place	2017 Egna	Pairs
Gold medal – first place	2018 Milan	Pairs
Gold medal – first place	2019 Trento	Pairs
Gold medal – first place	2020 Bergamo	Pairs
Gold medal – first place	2021 Egna	Pairs
Gold medal – first place	2022 Turin	Pairs
Silver medal – second place	2013 Milan	Pairs
Silver medal – second place	2014 Merano	Pairs
Silver medal – second place	2015 Turin	Pairs
Silver medal – second place	2024 Pinerolo	Pairs
Bronze medal – third place	2023 Brunico	Pairs

Matteo Guarise (born 15 September 1988) is an Italian pairs figure skater and roller skater. Currently competing in pair skating with partner Lucrezia Beccari, he is the 2024 European champion, a two-time ISU Grand Prix medalist, 2023 CS Nebelhorn Trophy silver medalist and 2024 Italian national silver medalist.

After winning the 2008 World Championship in pairs roller skating with Sara Venerucci, Guarise switched over to figure skating to compete with Nicole Della Monica. Guarise/Della Monica won seven Italian national pairs titles (2016–22). The pair represented Italy at the 2014, 2018 and 2022 Winter Olympics.

== Personal life ==
Guarise was born on September 15, 1988, in Rimini, Italy. In addition to being a figure skater, he also works as a police officer.

He became engaged to longtime girlfriend and former ice dancer, Carolina Moscheni, in 2022. They married on New Year's Eve in 2023. In September 2025, their son, Tommaso, was born.

== Career ==
=== In roller skating ===
Guarise was originally a roller skater and won the 2008 World title with Sara Venerucci. He ended his roller career in 2009 and moved to Milan.

=== Switch to figure skating ===
In January 2010, Guarise began training in figure skating. In June 2010, it was reported that he had teamed up with Elena Yarkhunova and was training with her under coach Oleg Vasiliev in Saint Petersburg, Russia and Chicago, Illinois. After their partnership ended, he skated with Kaela Pflumm and Caitlin Yankowskas.

=== Partnership with Della Monica ===
==== 2011–12 season ====
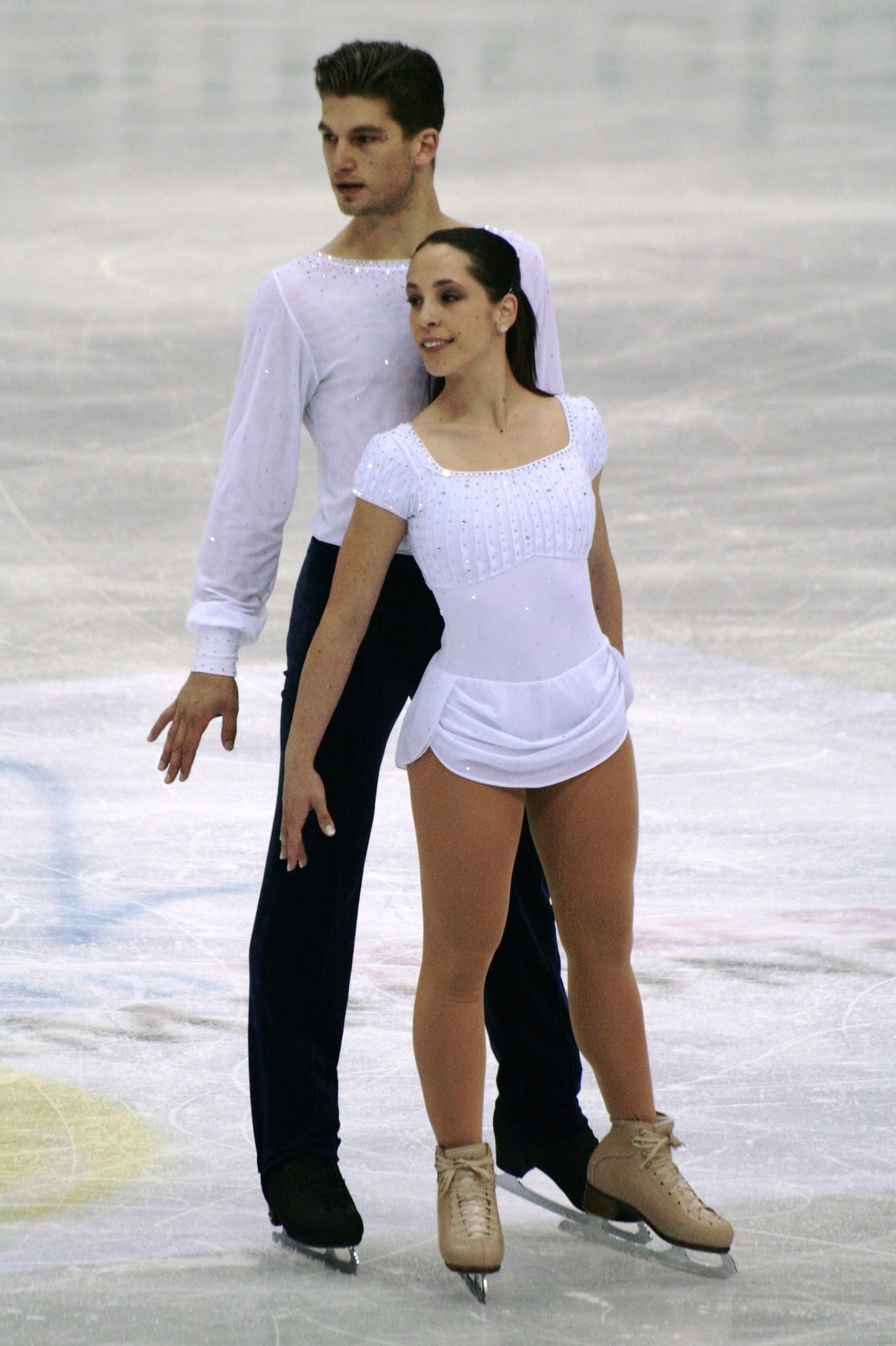
Della Monica and Guarise at the 2012 World Championships

Guarise teamed up with Nicole Della Monica in late November 2011. They train mainly in Zanica. They withdrew after the short program from the 2012 Italian Championships. Della Monica/Guarise made their international debut at the 2012 Bavarian Open, where they won the bronze medal. They were assigned to compete at the 2012 World Championships and finished fifteenth.

==== 2012–13 season ====
Della Monica/Guarise placed ninth at the 2013 European Championships and then fourteenth at the 2013 World Championships, where Italy secured two berths for the 2014 Olympic pairs event. They also won bronze at the 2013 Winter Universiade.

==== 2013–14 season ====
After taking silver at the 2014 Italian Championships, they placed eighth at the 2014 European Championships. Della Monica/Guarise were named along with Italian champions Stefania Berton / Ondrej Hotarek as Italy's pairs entries at the 2014 Winter Olympics in Sochi. Just before the event, Guarise tore the medial meniscus in his right knee. The pair finished sixteenth at the Olympics. He then underwent a knee operation and resumed training starting in March.

==== 2014–15 season ====
In the 2014–15 season, Della Monica/Guarise competed at two Grand Prix events, placing fifth at the 2014 Cup of China and sixth at the 2014 Trophée Éric Bompard. After finishing second to Valentina Marchei / Ondřej Hotárek at the Italian Championships, they came in sixth at the 2015 European Championships in Stockholm, Sweden and fourteenth at the 2015 World Championships in Shanghai, China.

==== 2015–16 season ====
In the 2015–16 season, Della Monica/Guarise took the bronze medal at the 2015 Ice Challenge, their first ISU Challenger Series (CS) event. After finishing fifth at their sole GP event, the 2015 Trophée Éric Bompard, they appeared at two more CS events, winning silver at the Warsaw Cup and placing sixth at the 2015 Golden Spin of Zagreb. In December 2015, they won their first national title together, edging out Marchei/Hotárek. They placed sixth at the 2016 European Championships, and then placed eleventh at the 2016 World Championships in Boston, United States.

==== 2016–17 season ====
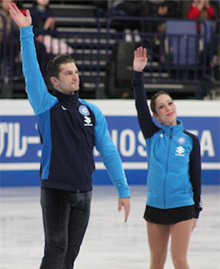
Nicole Della Monica and Matteo Guarise in 2017

The 2016–17 season saw the duo win two Challenger events, the 2016 Lombardia Trophy and 2016 Golden Spin of Zagreb. They placed sixth at the Skate Canada International and fifth at the Cup of China. After their second national title, they placed eighth at the 2017 European Championships and then placed thirteenth at the 2017 World Championships in Helsinki, Finland.

==== 2017–18 season ====
Guarise and his partner began the 2017–18 season with silver medals at Lombardia Trophy and Finlandia Trophy. Competing again at the Cup of China, they placed fourth. At the Internationaux de France, they placed third, winning their first Grand Prix bronze medal. Della Monica pronounced herself "really happy with our performance." Della Monica/Guarise won their third straight national title, followed by a sixth-place finish at Europeans. Competing at their second Olympic Games in Pyeongchang, South Korea, they placed tenth. The season concluded at the 2018 World Championships in Milan, where they placed fifth overall.

==== 2018–19 season ====
Their 2018–19 season began again at Lombardia Trophy, where they won the bronze medal. Turning to the Grand Prix series, they won silver at the 2018 Grand Prix of Helsinki. Della Monica commented, "this is our first silver medal on the Grand Prix. Last year we won our first medal, a bronze, so we are happy that we improved. Next time it maybe will be gold; who knows? It shows that we are on the right track." They won a second silver medal at the 2018 Rostelecom Cup, becoming the first Italian pair team to qualify for the Grand Prix Final, a goal they had set for themselves at the beginning of the year. They placed fifth at the Final, after multiple falls and popped jumps.

After winning their fourth consecutive national title, Della Monica/Guarise competed at the 2019 European Championships. They placed third in the short program, 0.12 points ahead of Aleksandra Boikova / Dmitrii Kozlovskii of Russia, and were awarded a small bronze medal for the result. In the free skate, both teams made errors, with Della Monica putting a hand down on their three-jump combination, as a result, finished fourth in the free skate and fourth overall, 0.14 points behind Boikova/Kozlovskii. Guarise said they were "a little bit disappointed actually because we gave everything we had. It maybe wasn’t 100 percent, but I think it was very good."

At the 2019 World Championships, Guarise collided with French skater Vanessa James in the warmup for the short program, which shook up both skaters. He then doubled his jump attempt, causing them to place eighth in the short. In the free skate, the team had multiple errors, finishing seventh there and eighth overall. Guarise reported that the aftereffects of the collision had been more of a problem than he initially believed. Della Monica/Guarise concluded the season at the 2019 World Team Trophy as part of Team Italy, which finished sixth out of sixth teams.

==== 2019–20 season ====
Della Monica dislocated her shoulder during the summer, significantly delaying the team's training. They returned to competition at the 2019 Icelab International in Italy, taking the silver medal, a week before their first Grand Prix. At the 2019 Cup of China, they placed fourth. At the 2019 NHK Trophy, Della Monica/Guarise placed eighth.

After winning the Italian title again, Della Monica/Guarise competed at the 2020 European Championships, placing fourth. They had been assigned to compete at the World Championships in Montreal, but these were cancelled as a result of the coronavirus pandemic.

==== 2020–21 season ====
Della Monica/Guarise were scheduled to compete on the Grand Prix at the 2020 Internationaux de France, but the event was cancelled due to the pandemic. They placed eighth at the 2021 World Championships in Stockholm. They were later named to the team for the 2021 World Team Trophy. On April 8, he was named team captain. Finishing the season at the Trophy, they placed second in the short program and fourth in the free skate, while Team Italy finished in fourth place overall.

==== 2021–22 season ====
Della Monica/Guarise began the season on home soil at the Lombardia Trophy, where they won the gold medal. They were initially assigned to the 2021 Cup of China as their first Grand Prix of the season, but following the event's cancellation, they were reassigned to a special home 2021 Gran Premio d'Italia, hosted in Turin. They placed third in the free skate despite both falling on their side-by-side jumps, but were fourth in the free skate with several errors and dropped to fourth place overall. Guarise acknowledged " today was hard physically and mentally," which he said did not reflect their training. They were seventh at the 2021 Rostelecom Cup. Della Monica said afterward that she intended to retire at the end of the season to start a family, while Guarise expressed a desire to continue, joking, "maybe she can be my coach one day."

After winning the gold medal at the Italian championships again, Della Monica/Guarise were named to the Italian Olympic team and withdrew from the 2022 European Championships as a precautionary measure after a fall in training.

Della Monica/Guarise began the 2022 Winter Olympics as the Italian entries in the pairs' short program of the Olympic team event, where they placed seventh of nine teams, earning four points for Team Italy. Team Italy did not advance to the second stage of the competition and finished seventh. In the pairs event, they placed tenth in the short program after Della Monica fell on her jump attempt. In the free skate, they dropped to thirteenth.

=== Partnership with Beccari ===
==== 2022–23 season ====
Della Monica decided to retire following the Beijing Olympics, but Guarise opted to continue skating with an eye to competing at the 2026 Winter Olympics, to be held in Italy in Milan and Cortina d'Ampezzo. To that end, he quickly formed a new partnership with former singles skater Lucrezia Beccari. On the end of his partnership with Della Monica, he commented "in life, people take different directions, but we have to remember the journey together with a smile."

Beccari/Guarise made their international debut at the 2022 CS Warsaw Cup, finishing in fourth place. They won the bronze medal at their first Italian championships, and were seventh at the 2023 European Championships.

==== 2023–24 season ====
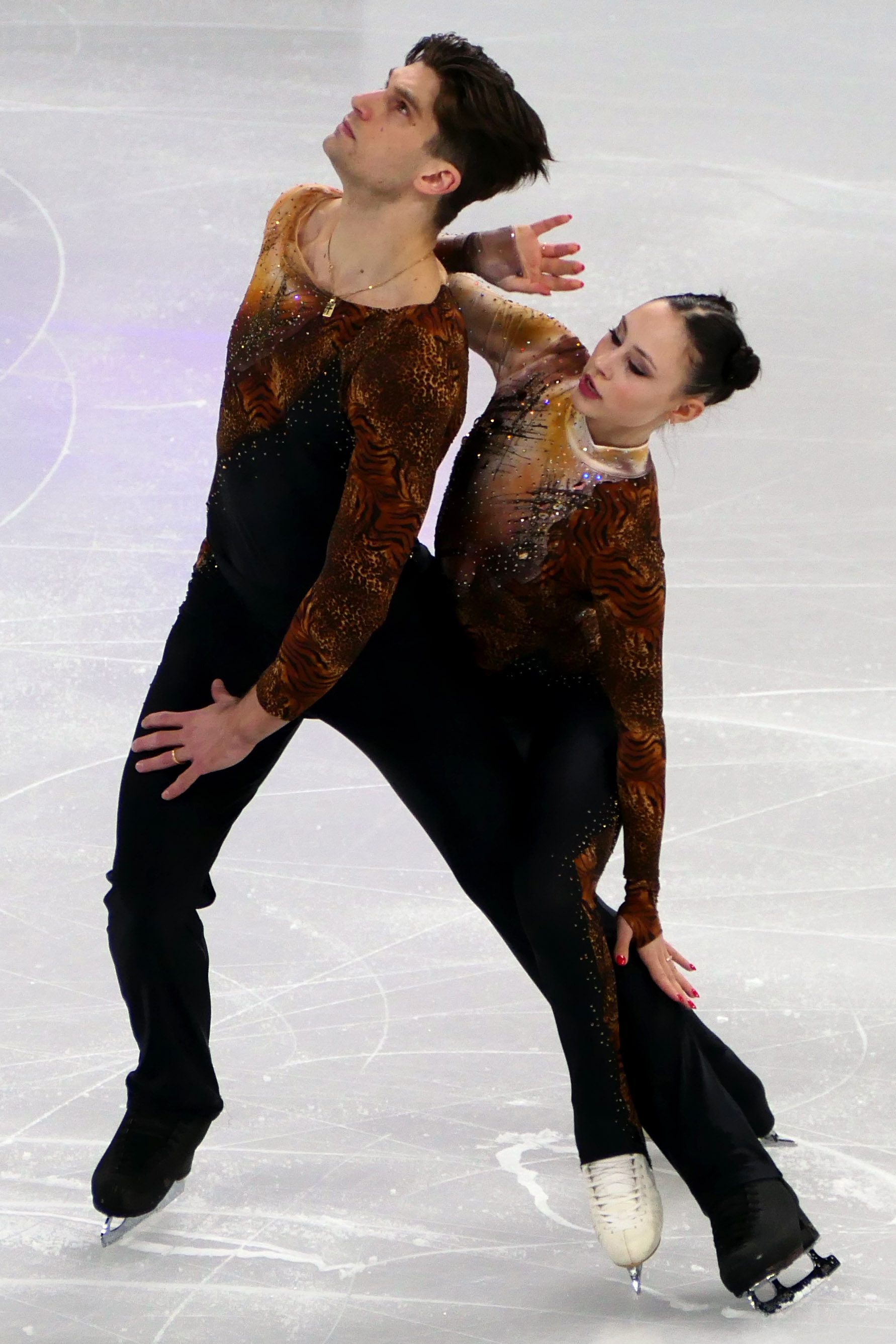
Beccari and Guarise during their free skate at the 2024 World Championships

Beccari/Guarise began the season with a fourth-place finish at the 2023 CS Lombardia Trophy. At their second Challenger event, the 2023 CS Nebelhorn Trophy, they won the silver medal, their first international podium together. They set new personal bests in both the free skate and total score. They were invited to make their Grand Prix debut at the 2023 Skate Canada International, where they won the bronze medal, despite each making a jump error in the free skate. Beccari remarked that she was "really happy" about her "first important medal," though "about the skate, we are not that happy." Guarise deemed it a "learning experience." They went on to win the silver medal at the 2023 NHK Trophy. Beccari/Guarise finished the Grand Prix with the same placements as fellow Italian team Ghilardi/Ambrosini and Hungarians Pavlova/Sviatchenko, but lost the tiebreaker of cumulative scores, and thus finished as second alternates to the Grand Prix Final. Guarise acknowledged this as disappointing, but said "for our first Grand Prix season we can be pleased."

After winning the silver medal at the Italian championships, Beccari/Guarise competed at the 2024 European Championships in Kaunas, generally noted rated among the title favourites in pre-event assessments. They finished third in the short program with a new personal best score, but then unexpectedly won the free skate and took the gold medal, 3.05 points ahead of Georgian silver medalists Metelkina/Berulava.

Beccari/Guarise were given one of the two Italian berths at the 2024 World Championships in Montreal. The finished eighth in the short program, ninth in the free skate, and ninth overall.

==== 2024–25 season ====
Beccari/Guarise began the season by winning silver at the 2024 Shanghai Trophy. Although the pair were scheduled to compete on the 2024–25 Grand Prix circuit at 2024 Skate Canada International and 2024 NHK Trophy, they would withdraw from both events due to Beccari sustaining a foot injury.

In December, Beccari announced that she and Guarise would miss the remainder of the season due to her needing to undergo surgery for her injury.

==== 2025–26 season ====
Returning to competition, Beccari/Guarise opened the season by competing on the 2025–26 ISU Challenger Series, finishing seventh at the 2025 CS Nebelhorn Trophy and at the 2025 CS Trialeti Trophy.

They subsequently competed at the 2025 Cup of China but were forced to withdraw before the free skate due to Beccari sustaining an injury. They went on to withdraw from their second Grand Prix assignment, 2025 Skate America, as well. The pair did not compete at the 2026 Italian Championships. Although assigned, they elected to withdraw from the 2026 European Championships.

== Programs ==
=== Pair skating with Lucrezia Beccari ===
Season	Short program	Free skating	Exhibition
2025–26	Run by Ludovico Einaudi choreo. by Luca Demattè, Barbara Fusar-Poli; Reel Around The Sun by Bill Whelan choreo. by Lukáš Csölley, Barbara Fusar-Poli	Romeo and Juliet; Kissing You (from Romeo + Juliet) by Des'ree; First Kiss; Forbidden Love from (Romeo & Juliet) by Abel Korzeniowski; O Verona (from Romeo + Juliet) by Craig Armstrong choreo. by Lukáš Csölley, Barbara Fusar-Poli	
2024–25	Reel Around The Sun by Bill Whelan choreo. by Lukáš Csölley, Barbara Fusar-Poli	Romeo and Juliet; Kissing You (from Romeo + Juliet) by Des'ree; First Kiss; Forbidden Love from (Romeo & Juliet) by Abel Korzeniowski; O Verona (from Romeo + Juliet) by Craig Armstrong choreo. by Lukáš Csölley, Barbara Fusar-Poli	Golden Hour by Jvke
2023–24	Run by Ludovico Einaudi choreo. by Luca Demattè, Barbara Fusar-Poli	Cats by Andrew Lloyd Webber & T. S. Eliot; Macavity: The Mystery Cat performed by Graham Hurman, John Ashton, Thomas Simon Lee, & Taylor Swift; Memory performed by Jennifer Hudson; Skimbleshanks: The Railway Cat performed by Steven McRae choreo. by Luca Demattè, Barbara Fusar-Poli	Golden Hour by Jvke
2022–23	The Joker and the Queen by Ed Sheeran; The Joker and the Queen performed by Louie Ashley choreo. by Valter Rizzo	Les Misérables by Claude-Michel Schönberg; I Dreamed a Dream performed by Susan Boyle; On My Own performed by Rosalind James choreo. by Valter Rizzo	

=== Pair skating with Nicole Della Monica ===
Season	Short program	Free skating	Exhibition
2021–22	Let It Be (from Across the Universe) performed by Timothy Mitchum, Carol Woods	Moulin Rouge!: Nature Boy by Nat King Cole performed by David Bowie; Your Song by Elton John performed by Ewan McGregor	Gonna Fly Now by Bill Conti; The Final Countdown by Europe; Let's Get It On by Marvin Gaye; Eye of the Tiger by Survivor
2020–21	Let It Be (from Across the Universe) performed by Timothy Mitchum, Carol Woods	Pilgrims on a Long Journey (from Child of Light) by Cœur de pirate; Saturn by Sleeping at Last	
2019–20	Crazy in Love by Beyoncé	Pilgrims on a Long Journey (from Child of Light) by Cœur de pirate; Saturn by Sleeping at Last	
2018–19	Never Tear Us Apart by Joe Cocker	Tristan and Isolde by Maxime Rodriguez	Gonna Fly Now by Bill Conti; The Final Countdown by Europe; Let's Get It On by Marvin Gaye; Eye of the Tiger by Survivor
2017–18	Magnificat performed by Mina	The Tree Of Life by Roberto Cacciapaglia	Stand by Me by Ben E. King; Let's Twist Again; Rock Around the Clock performed by Bill Haley & His Comets
2016–17	Carmina Burana by Carl Orff performed by The Piano Guys	Love Story (soundtrack) by Francis Lai performed by Nana Mouskouri	
2015–16	Magnificat performed by Mina	Cosmic Journey: The Cheek of Night; A Thousand Times Good Night (from Romeo & Juliet) by Abel Korzeniowski	Stand by Me by Ben E. King; Let's Twist Again; Rock Around the Clock performed by Bill Haley & His Comets
2014–15	Cinderella by Sergei Prokofiev	The Mask of Zorro (soundtrack) by James Horner	
2013–14	Samson and Delilah by Camille Saint-Saëns	La traviata by Giuseppe Verdi	
2012–13	Nothing Else Matters by Metallica	The Phantom of the Opera by Andrew Lloyd Webber	
2011–12	Romeo and Juliet by Nino Rota	Nocturne by Frédéric Chopin	

== Competitive highlights ==
- GP – Event of the ISU Grand Prix Series
- JGP – Event of the ISU Junior Grand Prix Series
- CS – Event of the ISU Challenger Series
- TBD – Assigned
- WD – Withdrew from competition
- C – Event was cancelled
- Medals at team events are awarded for the team results only. Individual placements at team events are listed in parentheses.

=== Pair skating with Lucrezia Beccari ===
Competition placements at senior level
Season	2022–23	2023–24	2024–25	2025–26
World Championships		9th		
European Championships	7th	1st		
Italian Championships	3rd	2nd		
GP Cup of China				WD
GP NHK Trophy		2nd		
GP Skate Canada		3rd		
CS Lombardia Trophy		4th		
CS Nebelhorn Trophy		2nd		7th
CS Trialeti Trophy				7th
CS Warsaw Cup	4th			
Challenge Cup		2nd		
Shanghai Trophy			2nd	

=== Pair skating with Nicole Della Monica ===
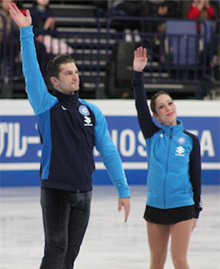
Nicole Della Monica and Matteo Guarise in 2017

Competition placements at senior level
Season	2011–12	2012–13	2013–14	2014–15	2015–16	2016–17	2017–18	2018–19	2019–20	2020–21	2021–22
Winter Olympics			16th				10th				13th
Winter Olympics (Team event)							4th				7th
World Championships	15th	14th	16th	14th	11th	13th	5th	8th	C	8th	
European Championships		9th	8th	6th	6th	8th	6th	4th	4th		
Grand Prix Final								5th			
Italian Championships	WD	2nd	2nd	2nd	1st	1st	1st	1st	1st	1st	1st
World Team Trophy								6th (3rd)		4th (4th)	
GP Cup of China				5th		5th	4th		4th		
GP Finland								2nd			
GP France			8th	6th	5th		3rd				
GP Italy											4th
GP NHK Trophy		7th							8th		
GP Rostelecom Cup		7th						2nd			7th
GP Skate Canada						6th					
CS Finlandia Trophy							2nd				
CS Golden Spin of Zagreb					6th	1st					
CS Ice Challenge					3rd						
CS Lombardia Trophy			5th			1st	2nd	3rd			1st
CS Warsaw Cup					2nd						
Bavarian Open	3rd										
Cup of Nice		3rd	7th	1st							
IceLab Cup									2nd		
Mentor Toruń Cup				1st							
Ondrej Nepela Trophy		3rd									
Team Challenge Cup					2nd (5th)						
Winter Universiade			3rd								

== Detailed results ==
ISU personal best scores in the +5/-5 GOE System
Segment	Type	Score	Event
Total	TSS	199.19	2024 European Championships
Short program	TSS	67.05	2024 European Championships
Short program	TES	37.35	2023 CS Lombardia Trophy
Short program	PCS	31.01	2024 World Championships
Free skating	TSS	132.14	2024 European Championships
Free skating	TES	69.09	2024 European Championships
Free skating	PCS	63.05	2024 European Championships

=== Pair skating with Lucrezia Beccari ===
Results in the 2022–23 season
Date	Event	SP		FS		Total	
Date	Event	P	Score	P	Score	P	Score
Nov 17–20, 2022	(Poland) 2022 CS Warsaw Cup	4	60.71	4	105.79	4	166.50
Dec 15–18, 2022	(Italy) 2023 Italian Championships	3	64.98	3	112.01	3	176.99
Jan 25–29, 2023	(Finland) 2023 European Championships	8	53.29	7	99.25	7	152.54

Results in the 2023–24 season
Date	Event	SP		FS		Total	
Date	Event	P	Score	P	Score	P	Score
Sep 8–10, 2023	(Italy) 2023 CS Nebelhorn Trophy	2	66.94	5	118.12	4	185.06
Sep 20–23, 2023	(Germany) 2023 CS Nebelhorn Trophy	3	66.36	1	125.35	1	191.71
Oct 27–29, 2023	2023 Skate Canada International	2	65.83	4	115.59	3	181.42
Nov 24–26, 2023	(Japan) 2023 NHK Trophy	2	66.77	2	123.54	2	190.31
Dec 22–23, 2023	(Italy) 2024 Italian Championships	1	70.99	2	121.04	2	191.13
Jan 8–14, 2024	(Lithuania) 2024 European Championships	3	67.05	1	132.14	1	199.19
Feb 22–25, 2024	(Netherlands) 2024 International Challenge Cup	2	62.22	2	113.19	2	175.41
Mar 18–24, 2024	(Canada) 2024 World Championships	8	66.12	9	119.28	9	185.40

Results in the 2024–25 season
Date	Event	SP		FS		Total	
Date	Event	P	Score	P	Score	P	Score
Oct 3–5, 2024	(China) 2024 Shanghai Trophy	2	61.72	2	116.63	2	178.35

Results in the 2025–26 season
Date	Event	SP		FS		Total	
Date	Event	P	Score	P	Score	P	Score
Sep 25–27, 2025	(Germany) 2025 CS Nebelhorn Trophy	7	62.96	7	118.26	7	181.22
Oct 8–11, 2025	(Georgia (country)) 2025 CS Trialeti Trophy	6	56.10	7	103.92	7	160.02
Oct 24–26, 2025	2025 Cup of China	8	55.67	–	–	–	WD

=== Pair skating with Nicole Della Monica ===
2021–22 season
Date	Event	SP	FS	Total
February 18–19, 2022	2022 Winter Olympics – Pairs event	10; 63.58	13; 116.29	13; 179.87
February 4–7, 2022	2022 Winter Olympics — Team event	7; 60.30	–	7P/7T; 60.30
December 4–5, 2021	2022 Italian Championships	1; 66.28	1; 129.61	1; 195.89
November 26–28, 2021	2021 Rostelecom Cup	6; 59.92	6; 112.93	7; 172.85
November 5–7, 2021	2021 Gran Premio d'Italia	3; 65.12	4; 114.14	4; 179.26
September 10–12, 2021	2021 CS Lombardia Trophy	1; 72.35	2; 115.75	1; 188.10
2020–21 season
Date	Event	SP	FS	Total
April 15–18, 2021	2021 World Team Trophy	2; 66.09	4; 128.24	4P/4T; 194.33
March 22–28, 2021	2021 World Championships	11; 59.95	8; 126.55	8; 186.50
December 12–13, 2020	2021 Italian Championships	1; 62.28	1; 125.67	1; 187.95
2019–20 season
Date	Event	SP	FS	Total
January 20–26, 2020	2020 European Championships	4; 70.48	4; 123.96	4; 194.44
December 12–15, 2019	2020 Italian Championships	1; 71.14	1; 117.11	1; 188.25
November 22–24, 2019	2019 NHK Trophy	8; 57.55	7; 113.88	8; 171.43
November 8–10, 2019	2019 Cup of China	4; 64.24	5; 118.64	4; 182.88
November 1–3, 2019	2019 IceLab International Cup	1; 62.59	2; 108.20	2; 170.79
2018–19 season
Date	Event	SP	FS	Total
April 11–14, 2019	2020 World Team Trophy	3; 69.77	4; 130.85	3P/6T; 200.62
March 18–24, 2019	2019 World Championships	8; 67.29	7; 128.45	8; 195.74
January 21–27, 2019	2019 European Championships	3; 73.70	4; 131.44	4; 205.14
December 13–16, 2018	2019 Italian Championships	1; 72.91	1; 127.17	1; 200.08
December 6–9, 2018	2018–19 Grand Prix Final	5; 69.77	6; 117.86	5; 187.63
November 16–18, 2018	2018 Rostelecom Cup	2; 72.32	2; 131.51	2; 203.83
November 2–4, 2018	2018 Grand Prix of Helsinki	1; 68.18	3; 117.59	2; 185.77
September 12–16, 2018	2018 CS Lombardia Trophy	2; 66.93	3; 111.25	3; 178.18
2017–18 season
Date	Event	SP	FS	Total
March 19–25, 2018	2018 World Championships	5; 72.53	5; 133.53	5; 206.06
February 14–15, 2018	2018 Winter Olympics – Pairs event	9; 74.00	10; 128.74	10; 202.74
February 9–12, 2018	2018 Winter Olympics – Team event	7; 67.62	–	7P/4T; 67.62
January 15–21, 2018	2018 European Championships	6; 64.53	6; 127.85	6; 192.38
December 13–16, 2017	2018 Italian Championships	2; 70.60	1; 129.90	1; 200.50
November 17–19, 2017	2017 Internationaux de France	3; 70.85	3; 126.94	3; 197.59
November 3–5, 2017	2017 Cup of China	3; 63.76	5; 126.49	4; 190.25
October 6–8, 2017	2017 CS Finlandia Trophy	3; 65.42	1; 128.08	2; 193.50
September 14–17, 2017	2017 CS Lombardia Trophy	2; 66.66	2; 124.73	2; 191.39
2016–17 season
Date	Event	SP	FS	Total
March 29–April 2, 2017	2017 World Championships	11; 70.08	12; 121.94	13; 192.02
January 25–29, 2017	2017 European Championships	8; 63.97	8; 117.02	8; 180.99
December 14–17, 2016	2017 Italian Championships	1; 70.22	2; 123.52	1; 193.74
December 7–10, 2016	2016 CS Golden Spin of Zagreb	1; 64.54	3; 116.06	1; 180.60
November 18–20, 2016	2016 Cup of China	5; 66.39	7; 109.99	5; 176.38
October 28–30, 2016	2016 Skate Canada International	6; 59.25	5; 119.42	6; 178.67
September 8–11, 2016	2016 CS Lombardia Trophy	2; 58.22	1; 126.96	1; 185.18
2015–16 season
Date	Event	SP	FS	Total
April 22–24, 2016	2016 Team Challenge Cup	–	5; 105.88	5P/2T; 105.88
March 28–April 3, 2016	2016 World Championships	11; 65.32	13; 118.49	11; 183.81
January 25–31, 2016	2016 European Championships	6; 61.51	6; 117.46	6; 178.97
December 16–19, 2015	2016 Italian Championships	1; 66.20	2; 118.08	1; 184.28
December 2–5, 2015	2015 CS Golden Spin of Zagreb	5; 58.66	6; 105.12	6; 163.78
November 27–29, 2015	2015 CS Warsaw Cup	2; 65.36	2; 126.62	2; 191.98
November 13–15, 2015	2015 Trophée Éric Bompard	5; 64.08	C	5; 64.08
October 27–31, 2015	2015 CS Ice Challenge	2; 58.34	4; 96.44	3; 154.78
2014–15 season
Date	Event	SP	FS	Total
March 23–29, 2015	2015 World Championships	14; 54.48	15; 97.29	14; 151.77
January 26–February 1, 2015	2015 European Championships	8; 48.43	5; 107.34	6; 155.77
January 7–10, 2015	2015 Mentor Toruń Cup	1; 53.82	1; 96.61	1; 150.43
December 20–21, 2014	2015 Italian Championships	2; 57.18	2; 100.96	2; 158.14
November 21–23, 2014	2014 Trophée Éric Bompard	6; 53.34	7; 107.79	6; 161.13
November 7–9, 2014	2014 Cup of China	7; 53.48	5; 102.42	5; 155.90
October 15–19, 2014	2014 International Cup of Nice	1; 53.54	3; 99.75	1; 153.29
2013–14 season
Date	Event	SP	FS	Total
March 24–30, 2014	2014 World Championships	16; 51.38	16; 87.92	16; 139.30
February 11–12, 2014	2014 Winter Olympics	16; 51.64	16; 86.22	16; 137.86
January 13–19, 2014	2014 European Championships	9; 53.65	8; 100.90	8; 154.55
December 18–21, 2013	2014 Italian Championships	2; 57.26	2; 98.59	2; 155.85
December 11–15, 2013	2013 Winter Universaide	3; 56.21	3; 104.74	3; 160.95
November 15–17, 2013	2013 Trophée Éric Bompard	8; 48.59	8; 99.29	8; 147.88
October 23–27, 2013	2013 International Cup of Nice	7; 43.06	6; 94.73	7; 137.79
September 19–22, 2013	2013 Lombardia Trophy	4; 53.76	5; 95.42	5; 149.18
2012–13 season
Date	Event	SP	FS	Total
March 11–17, 2013	2013 World Championships	15; 47.82	14; 88.21	14; 136.03
January 23–27, 2013	2013 European Championships	9; 47.26	8; 93.63	9; 140.89
December 19–22, 2012	2013 Italian Championships	2; 48.70	2; 102.48	2; 151.18
November 22–25, 2012	2012 NHK Trophy	7; 42.14	7; 79.39	7; 121.53
November 8–11, 2012	2012 Rostelecom Cup	6; 50.25	7; 92.28	7; 142.53
October 24–28, 2012	2012 Coupe Internationale de Nice	4; 44.52	3; 92.95	3; 137.47
October 3–7, 2012	2012 Ondrej Nepela Memorial	3; 39.28	3; 77.86	3; 117.14
2011–12 season
Date	Event	SP	FS	Total
March 26–April 1, 2012	2012 World Championships	14; 49.07	15; 88.24	15; 137.31
February 1–5, 2012	2012 Bavarian Open	3; 42.97	3; 83.40	3; 126.37
