= Nicole Della Monica =

Italian pair skater (born 1989)

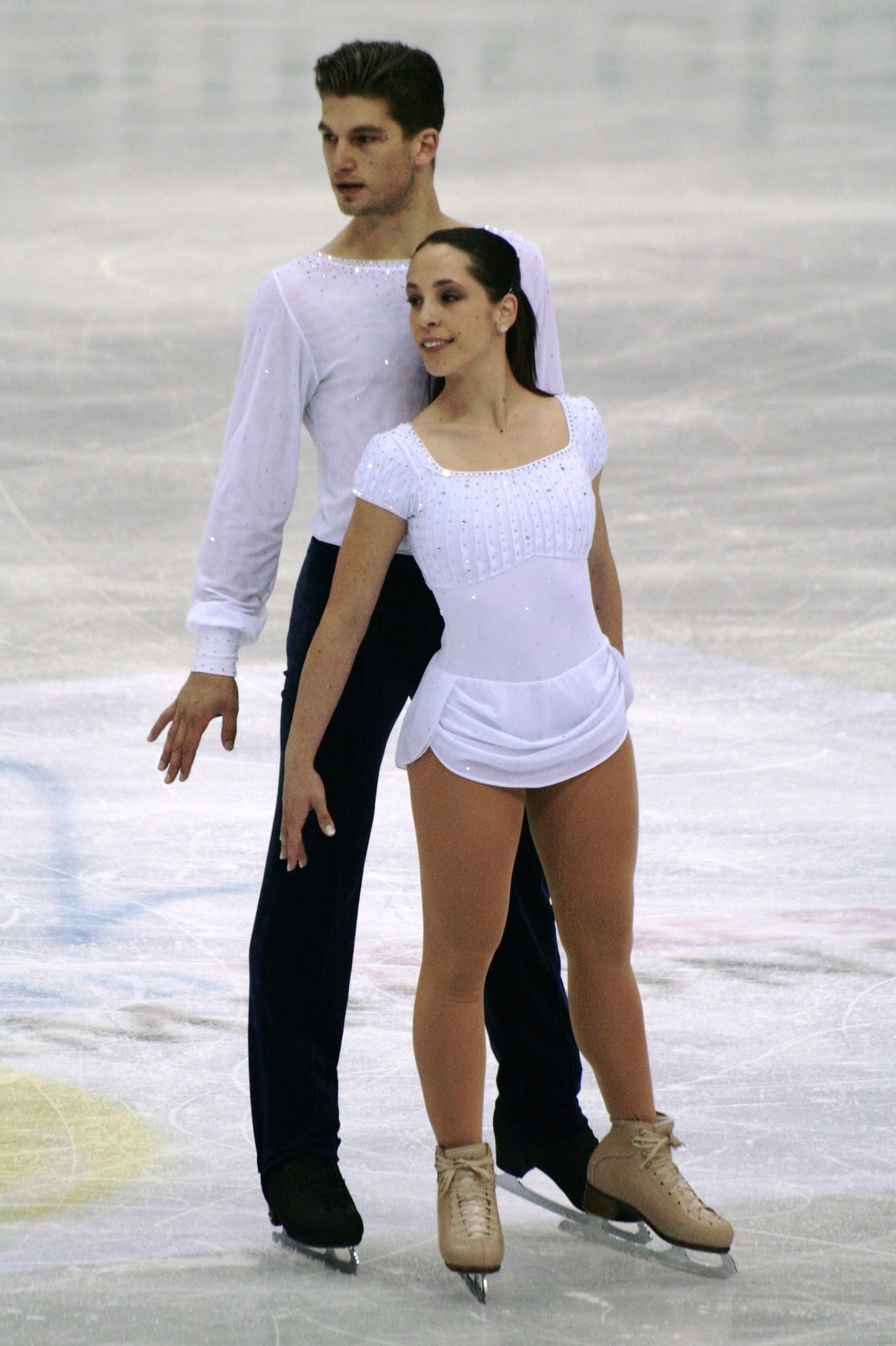
- Della Monica and Guarise at the 2012 World Championships

Personal information
- Born: 3 June 1989 (age 37) Trescore Balneario, Bergamo
- Home town: Albano
- Height: 1.56 m (5 ft 1 in)

Figure skating career
- Country: Italy
- Discipline: Pair skating
- Partner: Matteo Guarise; Yannick Kocon
- Began skating: 1995
- Retired: April 19, 2022

Medal record
Event	Gold medal – first place	Silver medal – second place	Bronze medal – third place
Italian Championships	9	3	1
Medal list
Italian Championships
Gold medal – first place	2009 Pinerolo	Pairs
Gold medal – first place	2010 Brescia	Pairs
Gold medal – first place	2016 Turin	Pairs
Gold medal – first place	2017 Egna	Pairs
Gold medal – first place	2018 Milan	Pairs
Gold medal – first place	2019 Trento	Pairs
Gold medal – first place	2020 Bergamo	Pairs
Gold medal – first place	2021 Egna	Pairs
Gold medal – first place	2022 Turin	Pairs
Silver medal – second place	2013 Milan	Pairs
Silver medal – second place	2014 Merano	Pairs
Silver medal – second place	2015 Turin	Pairs
Bronze medal – third place	2005 Merano	Singles

Nicole Della Monica (born 3 June 1989) is a retired Italian pair skater. With her former partner Matteo Guarise, she is a seven-time Italian national champion (2016–22) and has represented Italy at the 2014, 2018 and 2022 Winter Olympics.

With her previous partner Yannick Kocon, she was a two-time Italian national champion (2009, 2010) and competed at the 2010 Winter Olympics.

== Career ==
Della Monica competed as a single skater through the 2006–07 season and is the 2005 Italian national bronze medalist.

=== Partnership with Kocon ===
Della Monica started skating pairs in 2007 when she teamed up with Yannick Kocon, who was also a single skater until then. They are the 2009 and 2010 Italian national champions. They represented Italy at the 2010 Winter Olympics. Their partnership ended in January 2011 — Della Monica had a chronic inflammation in her left knee and her recovery time was uncertain.

=== Partnership with Guarise ===
==== 2011–12 season ====
Della Monica teamed up with former World champion roller skater Matteo Guarise in late November 2011. They train mainly in Zanica. They withdrew after the short program from the 2012 Italian Championships. Della Monica/Guarise made their international debut at the 2012 Bavarian Open where they won the bronze medal. They were assigned to compete at the 2012 World Championships and finished fifteenth.

==== 2012–13 season ====
Della Monica/Guarise placed ninth at the 2013 European Championships and then fourteenth at the 2013 World Championships, where Italy secured two berths for the 2014 Olympic pairs event. They also won bronze at the 2013 Winter Universiade.

==== 2013–14 season ====
After taking silver at the 2014 Italian Championships, they placed eighth at the 2014 European Championships. Della Monica/Guarise were named along with Italian champions Stefania Berton / Ondrej Hotarek as Italy's pairs entries at the 2014 Winter Olympics in Sochi. Just before the event, Guarise tore the medial meniscus in his right knee. The pair finished sixteenth at the Olympics. He then underwent a knee operation and resumed training at the start of March.

==== 2014–15 season ====
In the 2014–15 season, Della Monica/Guarise competed at two Grand Prix events, placing fifth at the 2014 Cup of China and sixth at the 2014 Trophée Éric Bompard. After finishing second to Valentina Marchei / Ondřej Hotárek at the Italian Championships, they came in sixth at the 2015 European Championships in Stockholm, Sweden and fourteenth at the 2015 World Championships in Shanghai, China.

==== 2015–16 season ====
In the 2015–16 season, Della Monica/Guarise took the bronze medal at the 2015 Ice Challenge, their first ISU Challenger Series (CS) event. After finishing fifth at their sole GP event, the 2015 Trophée Éric Bompard, they appeared at two more CS events, winning silver at the Warsaw Cup and placing sixth at the 2015 Golden Spin of Zagreb. In December 2015, they won their first national title together, edging out Marchei/Hotárek. They placed sixth at the 2016 European Championships, and then placed eleventh at the 2016 World Championships in Boston, United States.

==== 2016–17 season ====
The 2016–17 season saw the duo win two Challenger events, the 2016 Lombardia Trophy and 2016 Golden Spin of Zagreb. They placed sixth at the Skate Canada International and fifth at the Cup of China. After their second national title, they placed eighth at the 2017 European Championships, and then placed thirteenth at the 2017 World Championships in Helsinki, Finland.

==== 2017–18 season ====
Della Monica and her partner began the 2017–18 season with silver medals at Lombardia Trophy and Finlandia Trophy. Competing again at the Cup of China, they placed fourth. At the Internationaux de France, they placed third, winning their first Grand Prix bronze medal. Della Monica pronounced herself "really happy with our performance." Della Monica/Guarise won their third straight national title, followed by a sixth-place finish at Europeans. Competing at their second Olympic Games in Pyeongchang, South Korea, they placed tenth. The season concluded at the 2018 World Championships in Milan, where they placed fifth overall.

==== 2018–19 season ====
Their 2018–19 season began again at Lombardia Trophy, where they own the bronze medal. Turning to the Grand Prix series, they won silver at the 2018 Grand Prix of Helsinki. Della Monica commented that "this is our first silver medal on the Grand Prix. Last year we won our first medal, a bronze, so we are happy that we improved. Next time it maybe will be gold, who knows. It shows that we are on the right track." They won a second silver medal at the 2018 Rostelecom Cup, becoming the first Italian pair team to qualify for the Grand Prix Final, a goal they had set for themselves at the beginning of the year. They placed fifth at the Final, after multiple falls and popped jumps.

After winning their fourth consecutive national title, Della Monica/Guarise competed at the 2019 European Championships. They placed third in the short program, 0.12 points ahead of Aleksandra Boikova / Dmitrii Kozlovskii of Russia, and were awarded a small bronze medal for the result. In the free skate both teams made errors, with Della Monica putting a hand down on their three-jump combination, and a result finished fourth in the free skate and fourth overall, 0.14 points behind Boikova/Kozlovskii. Guarise said they were "a little bit disappointed actually, because we gave everything we had. It maybe wasn’t 100 percent, but I think it was very good."

At the 2019 World Championships, Guarise collided with French skater Vanessa James in the warmup for the short program, which shook up both skaters. He then doubled his jump attempt, causing them to place eighth in the short. In the free skate the team had multiple errors, finishing seventh there, and eighth overall. Guarise reported that the aftereffects of the collision had been more of a problem than he initially believed. Della Monica/Guarise concluded the season at the 2019 World Team Trophy as part of Team Italy, which finished sixth out of sixth teams.

==== 2019–20 season ====
Della Monica dislocated her shoulder during the summer, delaying the team's training significantly. They returned to competition at the 2019 Icelab International in Italy, taking the silver medal, a week before their first Grand Prix. At the 2019 Cup of China, they placed fourth. At the 2019 NHK Trophy, Della Monica/Guarise placed eighth.

After winning the Italian title again, Della Monica/Guarise competed at the 2020 European Championships, placing fourth. They had been assigned to compete at the World Championships in Montreal, but these were cancelled as a result of the coronavirus pandemic.

==== 2020–21 season ====
Della Monica/Guarise were scheduled to compete on the Grand Prix at the 2020 Internationaux de France, but the event was cancelled due to the pandemic. They placed eighth at the 2021 World Championships in Stockholm. Finishing the season at the 2021 World Team Trophy, they placed second in the short program and fourth in the free skate, while Team Italy finished in fourth place overall.

==== 2021–22 season ====
Della Monica/Guarise began the season on home soil at the Lombardia Trophy, where they won the gold medal. They were initially assigned to the 2021 Cup of China as their first Grand Prix of the season, but following the event's cancellation they were reassigned to a special home 2021 Gran Premio d'Italia, hosted in Turin. They placed third in the free skate despite both falling on their side-by-side jumps, but were fourth in the free skate with several errors and dropped to fourth place overall. Guarise acknowledged " today was hard physically and mentally," which he said did not reflect their training. They were seventh at the 2021 Rostelecom Cup. Della Monica said afterward that she intended to retire at the end of the season to start a family, while Guarise expressed a desire to continue, joking "maybe she can be my coach one day."

After winning the gold medal at the Italian championships again, Della Monica/Guarise were named to the Italian Olympic team and withdrew from the 2022 European Championships as a precautionary measure after a fall in training.

Della Monica/Guarise began the 2022 Winter Olympics as the Italian entries in the pairs' short program of the Olympic team event, where they placed seventh of nine teams, earning four points for Team Italy. Team Italy did not advance to the second stage of the competition and finished seventh. In the pairs event, they placed tenth in the short program after Della Monica fell on her jump attempt. In the free skate they dropped to thirteenth.

On 19 April 2022, Della Monica announced her retirement from competitive figure skating.

== Programs ==
=== Pair skating with Matteo Guarise ===
Season	Short program	Free skating	Exhibition
2021–22	Let It Be (from Across the Universe) performed by Timothy Mitchum, Carol Woods	Moulin Rouge!: Nature Boy by Nat King Cole performed by David Bowie; Your Song by Elton John performed by Ewan McGregor	Gonna Fly Now by Bill Conti; The Final Countdown by Europe; Let's Get It On by Marvin Gaye; Eye of the Tiger by Survivor
2020–21	Let It Be (from Across the Universe) performed by Timothy Mitchum, Carol Woods	Pilgrims on a Long Journey (from Child of Light) by Cœur de pirate; Saturn by Sleeping at Last	
2019–20	Crazy in Love by Beyoncé	Pilgrims on a Long Journey (from Child of Light) by Cœur de pirate; Saturn by Sleeping at Last	
2018–19	Never Tear Us Apart by Joe Cocker	Tristan and Isolde by Maxime Rodriguez	Gonna Fly Now by Bill Conti; The Final Countdown by Europe; Let's Get It On by Marvin Gaye; Eye of the Tiger by Survivor
2017–18	Magnificat performed by Mina	The Tree Of Life by Roberto Cacciapaglia	Stand by Me by Ben E. King; Let's Twist Again; Rock Around the Clock performed by Bill Haley & His Comets
2016–17	Carmina Burana by Carl Orff performed by The Piano Guys	Love Story (soundtrack) by Francis Lai performed by Nana Mouskouri	
2015–16	Magnificat performed by Mina	Cosmic Journey: The Cheek of Night; A Thousand Times Good Night (from Romeo & Juliet) by Abel Korzeniowski	Stand by Me by Ben E. King; Let's Twist Again; Rock Around the Clock performed by Bill Haley & His Comets
2014–15	Cinderella by Sergei Prokofiev	The Mask of Zorro (soundtrack) by James Horner	
2013–14	Samson and Delilah by Camille Saint-Saëns	La traviata by Giuseppe Verdi	
2012–13	Nothing Else Matters by Metallica	The Phantom of the Opera by Andrew Lloyd Webber	
2011–12	Romeo and Juliet by Nino Rota	Nocturne by Frédéric Chopin	

=== Pair skating with Yannick Kocon ===
Season	Short program	Free skating
2010–11	Piano Fantasy by William Joseph	Nocturne by Ennio Morricone
2009–10	Angels & Demons by Hans Zimmer	The Mission by Ennio Morricone
2008–09	Boléro by Maurice Ravel	The Mission by Ennio Morricone
2007–08	Lunatico by Gotan Project	Soundtrack medley by Maxime Rodriguez

=== Singles career ===
Season	Short program	Free skating
2004–05	Schindler's List by John Williams	Conquistador by Maxime Rodriguez

== Competitive highlights ==
=== Pair skating with Matteo Guarise ===
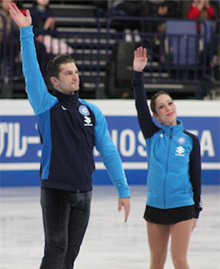
Nicole Della Monica and Matteo Guarise in 2017

Competition placements at senior level
Season	2011–12	2012–13	2013–14	2014–15	2015–16	2016–17	2017–18	2018–19	2019–20	2020–21	2021–22
Winter Olympics			16th				10th				13th
Winter Olympics (Team event)							4th				7th
World Championships	15th	14th	16th	14th	11th	13th	5th	8th	C	8th	
European Championships		9th	8th	6th	6th	8th	6th	4th	4th		
Grand Prix Final								5th			
Italian Championships	WD	2nd	2nd	2nd	1st	1st	1st	1st	1st	1st	1st
World Team Trophy								6th (3rd)		4th (4th)	
GP Cup of China				5th		5th	4th		4th		
GP Finland								2nd			
GP France			8th	6th	5th		3rd				
GP Italy											4th
GP NHK Trophy		7th							8th		
GP Rostelecom Cup		7th						2nd			7th
GP Skate Canada						6th					
CS Finlandia Trophy							2nd				
CS Golden Spin of Zagreb					6th	1st					
CS Ice Challenge					3rd						
CS Lombardia Trophy			5th			1st	2nd	3rd			1st
CS Warsaw Cup					2nd						
Bavarian Open	3rd										
Cup of Nice		3rd	7th	1st							
IceLab Cup									2nd		
Mentor Toruń Cup				1st							
Ondrej Nepela Trophy		3rd									
Team Challenge Cup					2nd (5th)						
Winter Universiade			3rd								

=== Pair skating with Yannick Kocon ===
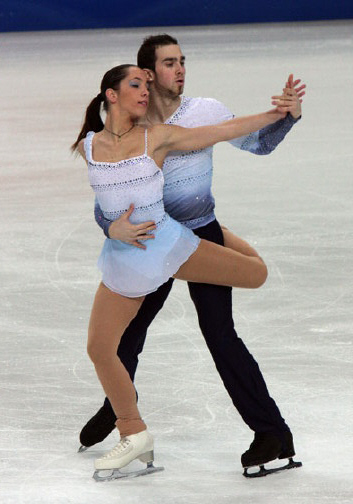
Della Monica and Kocon at the 2009 European Championships.

International
Event	2007–08	2008–09	2009–10	2010–11
Olympics			12th	
Worlds		18th		
Europeans		6th	6th	
GP Cup of China				6th
GP Cup of Russia			5th	
Cup of Nice				2nd
Golden Spin		2nd		
NRW Trophy		1st	1st	
International: Junior
Junior Worlds	14th			
National
Italian Champ.	1st J.	1st	1st	

=== Single skating ===
International
Event	2004–05	2005–06	2006–07
Merano Cup			2nd
International: Junior
JGP Canada		12th	
JGP Czech Republic			6th
JGP Poland		11th	
JGP Serbia	16th		
Dragon Trophy			2nd J
EYOF			2nd J
National
Italian Champ.	3rd		6th

== Detailed results ==
=== Pair skating with Matteo Guarise ===
2021–22 season
Date	Event	SP	FS	Total
February 18–19, 2022	2022 Winter Olympics – Pairs event	10; 63.58	13; 116.29	13; 179.87
February 4–7, 2022	2022 Winter Olympics — Team event	7; 60.30	–	7P/7T; 60.30
December 4–5, 2021	2022 Italian Championships	1; 66.28	1; 129.61	1; 195.89
November 26–28, 2021	2021 Rostelecom Cup	6; 59.92	6; 112.93	7; 172.85
November 5–7, 2021	2021 Gran Premio d'Italia	3; 65.12	4; 114.14	4; 179.26
September 10–12, 2021	2021 CS Lombardia Trophy	1; 72.35	2; 115.75	1; 188.10
2020–21 season
Date	Event	SP	FS	Total
April 15–18, 2021	2021 World Team Trophy	2; 66.09	4; 128.24	4P/4T; 194.33
March 22–28, 2021	2021 World Championships	11; 59.95	8; 126.55	8; 186.50
December 12–13, 2020	2021 Italian Championships	1; 62.28	1; 125.67	1; 187.95
2019–20 season
Date	Event	SP	FS	Total
January 20–26, 2020	2020 European Championships	4; 70.48	4; 123.96	4; 194.44
December 12–15, 2019	2020 Italian Championships	1; 71.14	1; 117.11	1; 188.25
November 22–24, 2019	2019 NHK Trophy	8; 57.55	7; 113.88	8; 171.43
November 8–10, 2019	2019 Cup of China	4; 64.24	5; 118.64	4; 182.88
November 1–3, 2019	2019 IceLab International Cup	1; 62.59	2; 108.20	2; 170.79
2018–19 season
Date	Event	SP	FS	Total
April 11–14, 2019	2020 World Team Trophy	3; 69.77	4; 130.85	3P/6T; 200.62
March 18–24, 2019	2019 World Championships	8; 67.29	7; 128.45	8; 195.74
January 21–27, 2019	2019 European Championships	3; 73.70	4; 131.44	4; 205.14
December 13–16, 2018	2019 Italian Championships	1; 72.91	1; 127.17	1; 200.08
December 6–9, 2018	2018–19 Grand Prix Final	5; 69.77	6; 117.86	5; 187.63
November 16–18, 2018	2018 Rostelecom Cup	2; 72.32	2; 131.51	2; 203.83
November 2–4, 2018	2018 Grand Prix of Helsinki	1; 68.18	3; 117.59	2; 185.77
September 12–16, 2018	2018 CS Lombardia Trophy	2; 66.93	3; 111.25	3; 178.18
2017–18 season
Date	Event	SP	FS	Total
March 19–25, 2018	2018 World Championships	5; 72.53	5; 133.53	5; 206.06
February 14–15, 2018	2018 Winter Olympics – Pairs event	9; 74.00	10; 128.74	10; 202.74
February 9–12, 2018	2018 Winter Olympics – Team event	7; 67.62	–	7P/4T; 67.62
January 15–21, 2018	2018 European Championships	6; 64.53	6; 127.85	6; 192.38
December 13–16, 2017	2018 Italian Championships	2; 70.60	1; 129.90	1; 200.50
November 17–19, 2017	2017 Internationaux de France	3; 70.85	3; 126.94	3; 197.59
November 3–5, 2017	2017 Cup of China	3; 63.76	5; 126.49	4; 190.25
October 6–8, 2017	2017 CS Finlandia Trophy	3; 65.42	1; 128.08	2; 193.50
September 14–17, 2017	2017 CS Lombardia Trophy	2; 66.66	2; 124.73	2; 191.39
2016–17 season
Date	Event	SP	FS	Total
March 29–April 2, 2017	2017 World Championships	11; 70.08	12; 121.94	13; 192.02
January 25–29, 2017	2017 European Championships	8; 63.97	8; 117.02	8; 180.99
December 14–17, 2016	2017 Italian Championships	1; 70.22	2; 123.52	1; 193.74
December 7–10, 2016	2016 CS Golden Spin of Zagreb	1; 64.54	3; 116.06	1; 180.60
November 18–20, 2016	2016 Cup of China	5; 66.39	7; 109.99	5; 176.38
October 28–30, 2016	2016 Skate Canada International	6; 59.25	5; 119.42	6; 178.67
September 8–11, 2016	2016 CS Lombardia Trophy	2; 58.22	1; 126.96	1; 185.18
2015–16 season
Date	Event	SP	FS	Total
April 22–24, 2016	2016 Team Challenge Cup	–	5; 105.88	5P/2T; 105.88
March 28–April 3, 2016	2016 World Championships	11; 65.32	13; 118.49	11; 183.81
January 25–31, 2016	2016 European Championships	6; 61.51	6; 117.46	6; 178.97
December 16–19, 2015	2016 Italian Championships	1; 66.20	2; 118.08	1; 184.28
December 2–5, 2015	2015 CS Golden Spin of Zagreb	5; 58.66	6; 105.12	6; 163.78
November 27–29, 2015	2015 CS Warsaw Cup	2; 65.36	2; 126.62	2; 191.98
November 13–15, 2015	2015 Trophée Éric Bompard	5; 64.08	C	5; 64.08
October 27–31, 2015	2015 CS Ice Challenge	2; 58.34	4; 96.44	3; 154.78
2014–15 season
Date	Event	SP	FS	Total
March 23–29, 2015	2015 World Championships	14; 54.48	15; 97.29	14; 151.77
January 26–February 1, 2015	2015 European Championships	8; 48.43	5; 107.34	6; 155.77
January 7–10, 2015	2015 Mentor Toruń Cup	1; 53.82	1; 96.61	1; 150.43
December 20–21, 2014	2015 Italian Championships	2; 57.18	2; 100.96	2; 158.14
November 21–23, 2014	2014 Trophée Éric Bompard	6; 53.34	7; 107.79	6; 161.13
November 7–9, 2014	2014 Cup of China	7; 53.48	5; 102.42	5; 155.90
October 15–19, 2014	2014 International Cup of Nice	1; 53.54	3; 99.75	1; 153.29
2013–14 season
Date	Event	SP	FS	Total
March 24–30, 2014	2014 World Championships	16; 51.38	16; 87.92	16; 139.30
February 11–12, 2014	2014 Winter Olympics	16; 51.64	16; 86.22	16; 137.86
January 13–19, 2014	2014 European Championships	9; 53.65	8; 100.90	8; 154.55
December 18–21, 2013	2014 Italian Championships	2; 57.26	2; 98.59	2; 155.85
December 11–15, 2013	2013 Winter Universaide	3; 56.21	3; 104.74	3; 160.95
November 15–17, 2013	2013 Trophée Éric Bompard	8; 48.59	8; 99.29	8; 147.88
October 23–27, 2013	2013 International Cup of Nice	7; 43.06	6; 94.73	7; 137.79
September 19–22, 2013	2013 Lombardia Trophy	4; 53.76	5; 95.42	5; 149.18
2012–13 season
Date	Event	SP	FS	Total
March 11–17, 2013	2013 World Championships	15; 47.82	14; 88.21	14; 136.03
January 23–27, 2013	2013 European Championships	9; 47.26	8; 93.63	9; 140.89
December 19–22, 2012	2013 Italian Championships	2; 48.70	2; 102.48	2; 151.18
November 22–25, 2012	2012 NHK Trophy	7; 42.14	7; 79.39	7; 121.53
November 8–11, 2012	2012 Rostelecom Cup	6; 50.25	7; 92.28	7; 142.53
October 24–28, 2012	2012 Coupe Internationale de Nice	4; 44.52	3; 92.95	3; 137.47
October 3–7, 2012	2012 Ondrej Nepela Memorial	3; 39.28	3; 77.86	3; 117.14
2011–12 season
Date	Event	SP	FS	Total
March 26–April 1, 2012	2012 World Championships	14; 49.07	15; 88.24	15; 137.31
February 1–5, 2012	2012 Bavarian Open	3; 42.97	3; 83.40	3; 126.37
