= Anastasia Mishina =

Russian pair skater (born 2001)

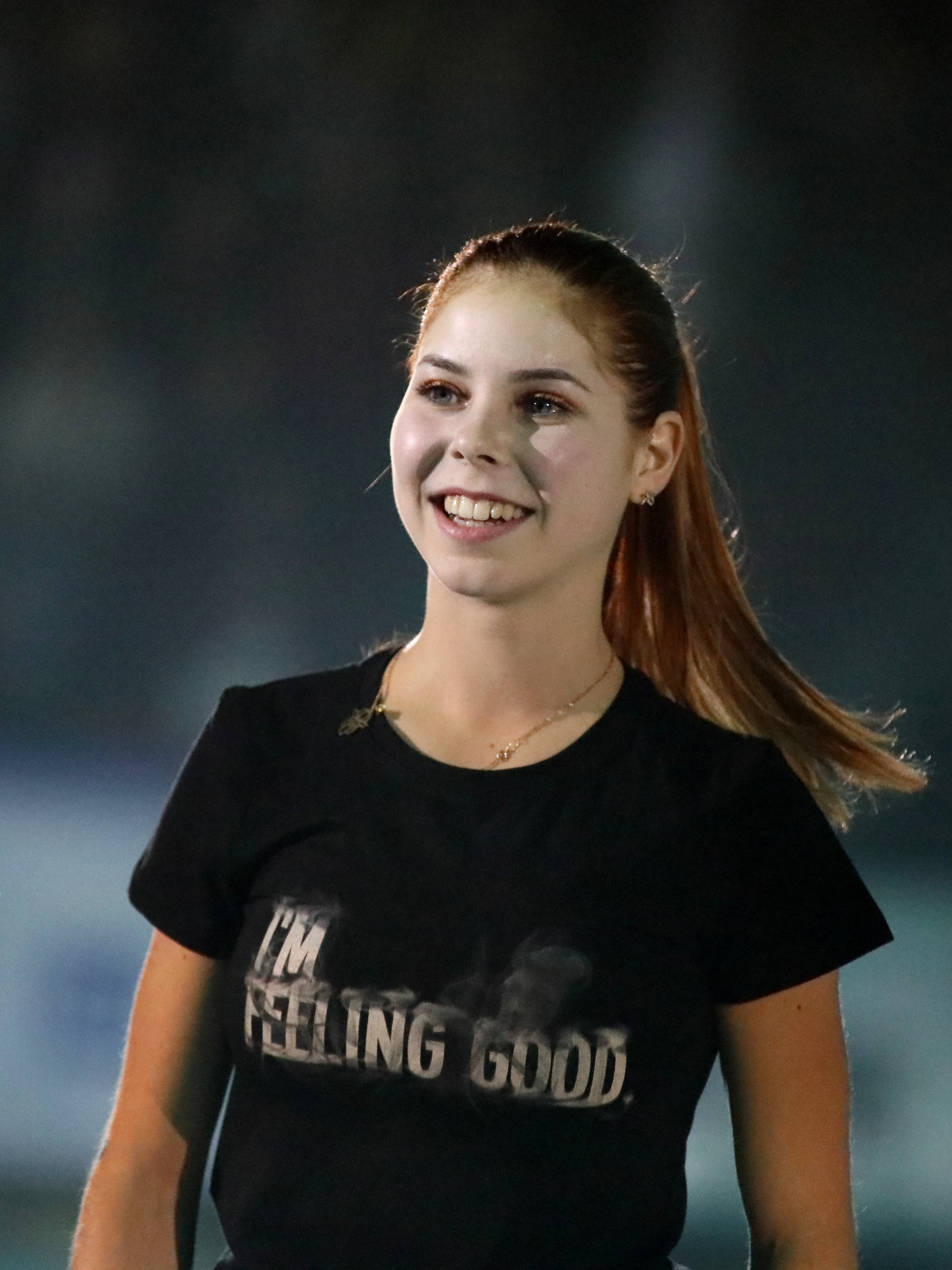
- At the 2019 Internationaux de France

Personal information
- Native name: Анастасия Викторовна Мишина
- Full name: Anastasia Viktorovna Mishina
- Born: 24 April 2001 (age 25) Saint Petersburg, Russia
- Home town: Saint Petersburg, Russia
- Height: 1.57 m (5 ft 2 in)

Figure skating career
- Country: (Individual Neutral Athletes) Individual Neutral Athlete; Russia
- Partner: Aleksandr Galliamov
- Coach: Tamara Moskvina; Artur Minchuk; Nikolai Moroshkin
- Skating club: Tamara Moskvina Figure Skating Club
- Began skating: 2006
Medal record
Figure skating: Pairs
Representing ROC (with Galliamov)
Olympic Games
Bronze medal – third place	2022 Beijing	Team (Note: On 29 January 2024 CAS disqualified Valieva for four years retroactive to 25 December 2021 for an anti-doping rule violation. On 30 January 2024 the ISU reallocated medals to upgrade the United States to gold and Japan to silver while downgrading ROC to bronze.)
Bronze medal – third place	2022 Beijing	Pairs
Representing FSR (with Galliamov)
World Championships
Gold medal – first place	2021 Stockholm	Pairs
Representing Russia (with Galliamov)
European Championships
Gold medal – first place	2022 Tallinn	Pairs
World Team Trophy
Gold medal – first place	2021 Osaka	Team
Russian Championships
Gold medal – first place	2022 Saint Petersburg	Pairs
Gold medal – first place	2024 Chelyabinsk	Pairs
Gold medal – first place	2025 Omsk	Pairs
Silver medal – second place	2023 Krasnoyarsk	Pairs
World Junior Championships
Gold medal – first place	2019 Zagreb	Pairs
Bronze medal – third place	2018 Sofia	Pairs
Junior Grand Prix Final
Gold medal – first place	2018–19 Vancouver	Pairs
Representing Russia (with Mirzoev)
World Junior Championships
Silver medal – second place	2016 Debrecen	Pairs
Junior Grand Prix Final
Gold medal – first place	2016–17 Marseille	Pairs

Anastasia Viktorovna Mishina (Russian: Анастасия Викторовна Мишина, born 24 April 2001) is a Russian pair skater who currently competes as an Individual Neutral Athlete. With her skating partner, Aleksandr Galliamov, she is the 2022 Olympic pairs bronze medalist and the 2022 Olympic bronze medalist in the team event, 2021 World champion, the 2022 European champion, the 2019–20 Grand Prix Final bronze medalist, a three-time Grand Prix event champion, and a three-time Russian national champion (2022, 2024–25). She is also the 2019 World Junior champion, the 2018 World Junior bronze medalist, 2018–19 Junior Grand Prix Final champion, and 2019 Russian national junior champion.

Mishina/Galliamov won the gold medal in their Worlds debut at the 2021 World Championships, becoming the second youngest pair to win the World Championships after Ekaterina Gordeeva / Sergei Grinkov.

With her former partner, Vladislav Mirzoev, she is the 2016 World Junior silver medalist, 2016 Junior Grand Prix Final champion, and 2016 Russian national junior champion.

== Personal life ==
Mishina was born on 24 April 2001 in Saint Petersburg, Russia. In December 2022, the Ukrainian Parliament sanctioned Mishina for her support of the 2022 Russian invasion of Ukraine.

== Career ==
=== Early years and teaming up with Mirzoev ===
Mishina began skating in 2006. As a single skater, she was coached by Fedor Klimov's mother, who suggested that she try pairs like her son. Mishina skated two seasons with Maxim Kudryavtsev, from 2012 to 2014.

Mishina teamed up with Vladislav Mirzoev in early 2014. Coached by Nikolai Velikov and Ludmila Velikova, they won the junior pairs' title at the 2015 Bavarian Open, their first international event.

=== 2015–2016 season: Silver at Junior Worlds ===
Mishina/Mirzoev made their Junior Grand Prix (JGP) debut in September 2015, placing fifth in Colorado Springs, Colorado. It was the pair's sole assignment of the 2015–16 JGP series. In January 2016, they won gold at the Russian Junior Championships after placing first in both segments and outscoring silver medalists Atakhanova/Spiridonov by a margin of 6.89 points. In February, they won their second consecutive Bavarian Open junior title, finishing ahead of Ohanesian/Bardei (silver) by 7.12 points.

In March, Mishina/Mirzoev won the silver medal at the 2016 World Junior Championships in Debrecen, Hungary, after placing second in both segments. They finished 9.22 points behind gold medalists Anna Dušková / Martin Bidař of the Czech Republic and 3.6 points ahead of teammates Ekaterina Borisova / Dmitry Sopot.

=== 2016–2017 season: Gold at JGP Final ===
Mishina/Mirzoev were awarded gold at both of their 2016–17 JGP assignments, in Saransk, Russia, and Dresden, Germany. They were the top qualifiers at the JGP Final and won gold at the event, which was held in December in Marseille, France.

In January 2017, Mishina stated that they would likely split due to disagreements but that they intended to complete the season. She said that he was struggling with her weight but that it was not possible for her to lose more.

=== 2017–2018 season: Teaming up with Galliamov, bronze at Junior Worlds ===
Mishina teamed up with Aleksandr Galliamov in February 2017. Coached by Nikolai Velikov and Ludmila Velikova, the pair won the junior title at the 2017 Golden Spin of Zagreb, their first international event.

Mishina/Galliamov placed seventh at the 2018 Russian Championships and took silver at the junior event. In March 2018, they won bronze at the 2018 World Junior Championships in Sofia, Bulgaria. They were part of a Russian sweep of the pairs' podium, along with their training partners Kostiukovich/Ialin (silver) and Pavliuchenko/Khodykin (gold).

=== 2018–2019 season: Junior World title ===
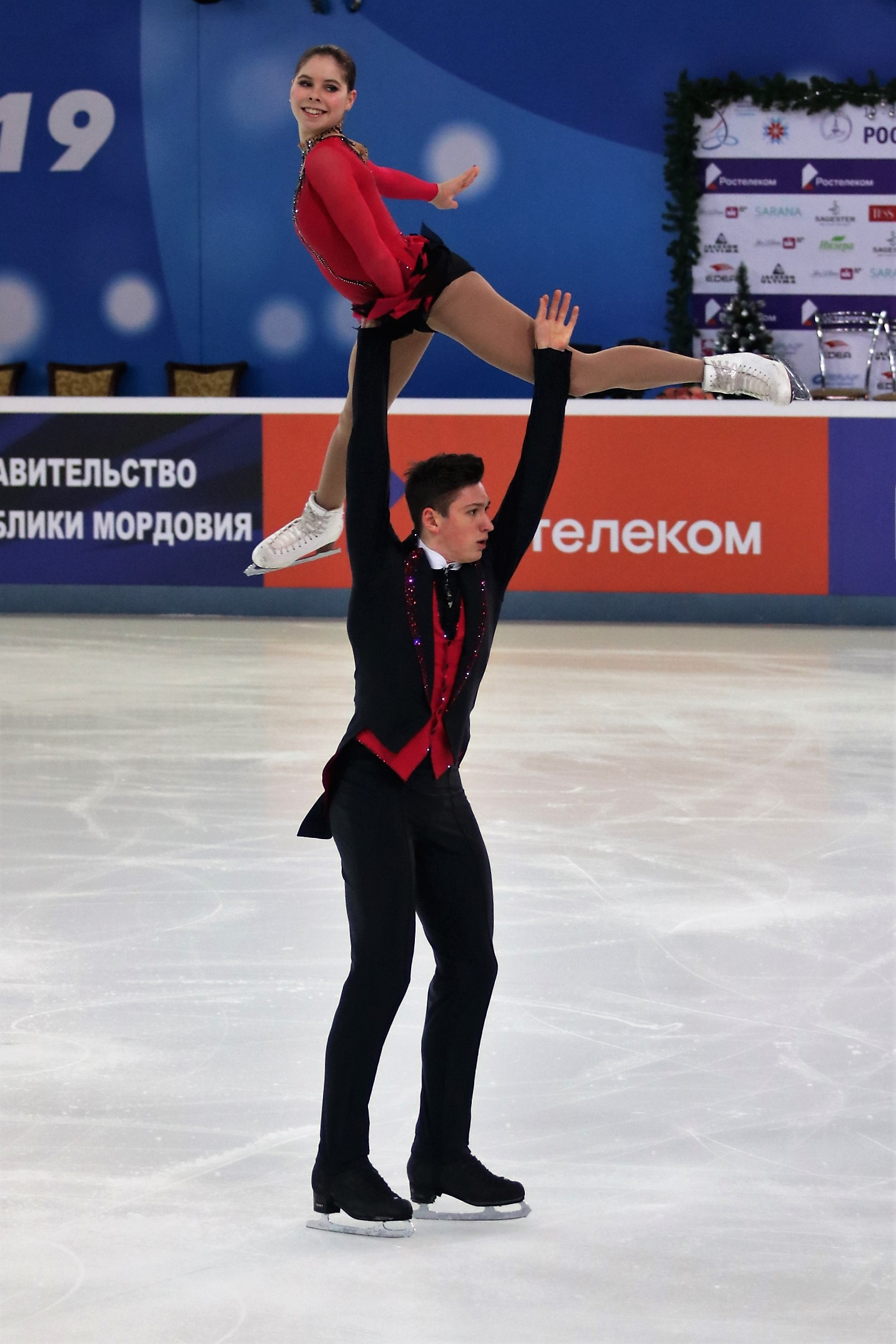
Mishina/Galiamov at the 2019 Russian Figure Skating Championships

Mishina/Galliamov started their season by competing in the 2018 JGP series. At their first JGP event of the season, they won the gold medal in Bratislava, Slovakia. They were ranked first in both the short program and the free skate and won the gold medal by a margin of more than 11 points over the silver medalists, their teammates Panfilova/Rylov. At their second JGP event of the season they won another gold medal, now in Vancouver, Canada. Again they were ranked first in both the short program and the free skate, and again they beat the same silver medalists, Panfilova/Rylov. This time they beat them by about 10 points. Mishina/Galliamov also upgraded their earlier short program, free skate, and combined total record scores. With two JGP gold medals, they qualified for the 2018–19 Junior Grand Prix Final.

Mishina/Galliamov made their international senior debut at the 2018 CS Alpen Trophy, where they won the gold medal with a personal best score of 192.75 points.

At the JGP Final, Mishina/Galliamov won the gold medal after placing third in the short program and first in the free skate. They were part of a Russian sweep of the pairs' podium. Mishina/Galliamov beat the bronze medalists, Panfilova/Rylov, by about 4 points, but the race for the gold medal was tight. Mishina/Galliamov won the gold medal by a margin of only 1.1 points over the silver medalists, their training partners Kostiukovich/Ialin. At this event, Mishina/Galliamov also upgraded their junior-level pairs' record for the combined total (190.63 points) and free program (126.26 points).

At the 2019 Russian Championships, they competed as seniors domestically, placing fourth in the short program with upgraded jump and throw content. They slipped to fifth place overall after placing fifth in the free skate when Mishina fell on the side-by-side combination jump attempt. Mishina/Galliamov subsequently won the Russian junior national title.

Assigned to the 2019 World Junior Championships, Mishina/Galliamov placed third in the short program after Galliamov struggled on their side-by-side spin. They won the free skate, despite another fall by Mishina on the jump combination, and narrowly took gold over Panfilova/Rylov by a margin of 0.57 points. Galliamov said that being third after the short program had motivated them to perform better in the free.

=== 2019–2020 season: Grand Prix Final bronze ===
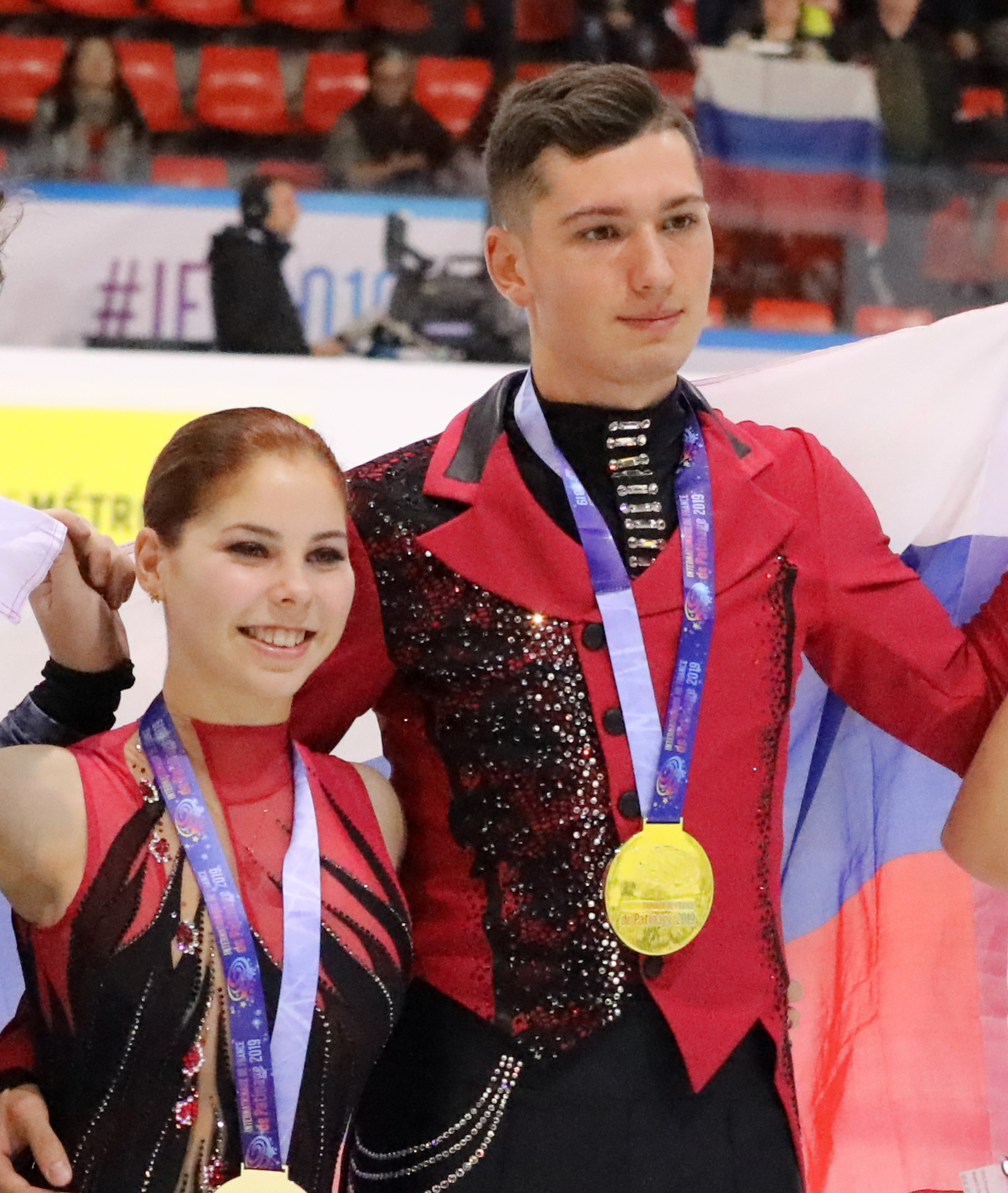
Mishina/Galliamov at the 2019 Internationaux de France podium.

Mishina/Galliamov began their first full senior season on the Challenger series, competing and winning at the 2019 CS Finlandia Trophy after placing first in both segments.

Making their senior Grand Prix debut at the 2019 Internationaux de France, Mishina/Galliamov were second in the short program behind Pavliuchenko/Khodykin. They won the free skate to take the gold medal, despite Mishina botching their planned three-jump combination. At their second Grand Prix, the 2019 NHK Trophy, they placed third in the short program after a jump problem from Galliamov. They were clean in the free skate, winning the bronze medal and qualifying for the Grand Prix Final. Competing at the Final, Mishina/Galliamov were fourth in the short program, skating cleanly but for their side-by-side spins not receiving a level due to errors. Third in the free skate, they won the bronze medal overall, the highest-ranked Russian team in the competition.

Mishina/Galliamov ran into trouble in the short program at the 2020 Russian Championships, with Mishina falling on their throw triple flip, stumbling in the step sequence, and exiting the pair spin too early. Consequently, they placed eighth in the segment. The free skate proved much more successful, with them placing third and rising to fourth place overall. She observed, "we were not in a good mood, but we were able to recover."

=== 2020–2021 season: World Champions ===
In the spring of 2020, Mishina/Galliamov moved to train under Tamara Moskvina, the coach of numerous Olympic pairs champions, and choreographer Alexander Stepin. They debuted their programs at the senior Russian test skates, earning particular notice for an innovative lift in their short program to Cesare Pugni's La Esmeralda. They were scheduled to compete in the second stage of the domestic Russian Cup, but had to withdraw after Galliamov contracted COVID-19. Subsequently, they were able to compete in the fourth stage of the Russian Cup in Kazan, winning the gold medal over former national champions Tarasova/Morozov and their fellow Moskvina students Boikova/Kozlovskii.

Competing on the Grand Prix at the 2020 Rostelecom Cup shortly after that, they placed first in the short program, narrowly ahead of Boikova/Kozlovskii, after both teams made errors. In the free skate, Mishina singled a planned triple Salchow, resulting in a second-place finish in that segment and the silver medal overall, behind Boikova/Kozlovskii.

At the 2021 Russian Championships, Mishina/Galliamov entered with expectations of vying for the top of the podium but encountered problems in the short program when Galliamov skated through his attempt at a side-by-side jump. As a result, they placed fifth in that segment. The free skate also proved difficult, with both making jump errors and Galliamov almost dropping Mishina in their final lift. Galliamov was uncertain as to why they had performed poorly but suggested his being unwell the week before may have been a factor.

Following their disappointment at the national championships, Mishina/Galliamov participated in the 2021 Channel One Trophy, a televised competition organized in lieu of the cancelled European Championships. They were selected for the Time of Firsts team captained by Evgenia Medvedeva and placed second in both segments, while the team finished in second place. After this, they competed at the Russian Cup Final, which was widely viewed as a contest between them and national bronze medalists Pavliuchenko/Khodykin for the third Russian pairs berth at the 2021 World Championships in Stockholm. Mishina/Galliamov won both segments of the competition to take the gold medal, their only minor mistake being a free skate jump step out from Mishina.

At the 2021 World Championships in March, Mishina/Galliamov skated both of their programs cleanly to earn new personal bests in both individual segments as well as overall. In the short program, the team ranked third behind training-mates Boikova/Kozlovskii in first and Chinese team Sui/Han in second, but in the free skate overtook the two leading teams to win the segment and claim the title unexpectedly. Mishina/Galliamov are the first team to win gold in their Worlds debut since Gordeeva/Grinkov of the Soviet Union in 1986, and the second-youngest pair to win Worlds after Gordeeva/Grinkov. They then concluded the season at the 2021 World Team Trophy, where they easily placed first in both segments to help Team Russia win the gold medal.

=== 2021–2022 season: Beijing Olympics, national champions ===
Entering the Olympic season as the reigning World champions, Mishina and Galliamov opted to retain their La Esmeralda program from the previous season, with revisions to account for new technical elements and choreography. Coach Moskvina designed their new free program to the music of Georgi Sviridov to express how "the youth is striving for something new and different than the past generation." Making their season debut at the 2021 CS Finlandia Trophy, they won the gold medal over rivals Tarasova/Morozov.

At their first Grand Prix assignment, the 2021 NHK Trophy, Mishina/Galliamov won both segments of the competition to take the gold medal, again over Tarasova/Morozov. They skated without error in the short program and the free skate and had only a minor issue with their throw triple loop landing, requiring Mishina to put a hand down. Galliamov said they were "satisfied" with the result but "not the maximum yet; there is still room to grow." At their second event, the 2021 Rostelecom Cup, they were second in the short program after a jump error but won the free skate easily to take another gold medal. The results qualified them for the Grand Prix Final, to be held in Osaka, but it was subsequently cancelled due to restrictions prompted by the Omicron variant.

At the 2022 Russian Championships, Mishina/Galliamov placed first in both segments of the competition to take the gold medal, 3.87 points ahead of silver medalists and training partner rivals Boikova/Kozlovskii. Mishina remarked afterward, "out of principle, we wanted to be on the podium here. This is our fourth time at Nationals, and we've never made the podium before, and I didn't make it with my previous partner either."

Making their European Championship debut at the 2022 edition in Tallinn, Mishina/Galliamov won the short program, prevailing over a clean skate by Tarasova/Morozov by 0.78 points, and breaking their training partners Boikova/Kozlovskii's world record in the process. Clean in the free skate as well, they won the gold medal and broke Chinese pair Sui/Han's world record in that segment. Despite this, Mishina said, "we don't really pay attention to the scores and haven't even seen the protocols, but this isn't the best we can do. We can still do better than that." On 20 January, they were officially named to the Russian Olympic team.

Mishina/Galliamov began the Olympic Games as the Russian entry in the pairs' short program of the Olympic team event, facing off against Chinese rivals Sui/Han for the first time since the 2021 World Championships. Both teams skated cleanly, with Sui/Han reclaiming their world record with a new high score of 82.83. Mishina/Galliamov scored 82.64, 0.19 less. This result secured nine points for the Russian team. They also performed in the free skate segment, winning it despite a double-fall on their final lift, and together with the rest of Team Russia, won the gold medal. In the pairs event, Mishina/Galliamov skated two clean programs to win the bronze medal, with a total score 2.17 points back of gold medalists Sui/Han and 1.54 points behind silver medalists Tarasova Morozov. Mishina said afterward that while they had hoped to win, "we were just happy with the fact that we managed to do everything well. If an athlete does everything that he can, there is more happiness than disappointment. We will keep working. Third place gives us motivation to work harder."

In early March 2022, the ISU banned all figure skaters and officials from Russia and Belarus from attending the World Championships due to the Russian invasion of Ukraine; therefore Mishina/Galliamov were not allowed to participate and defend their title.

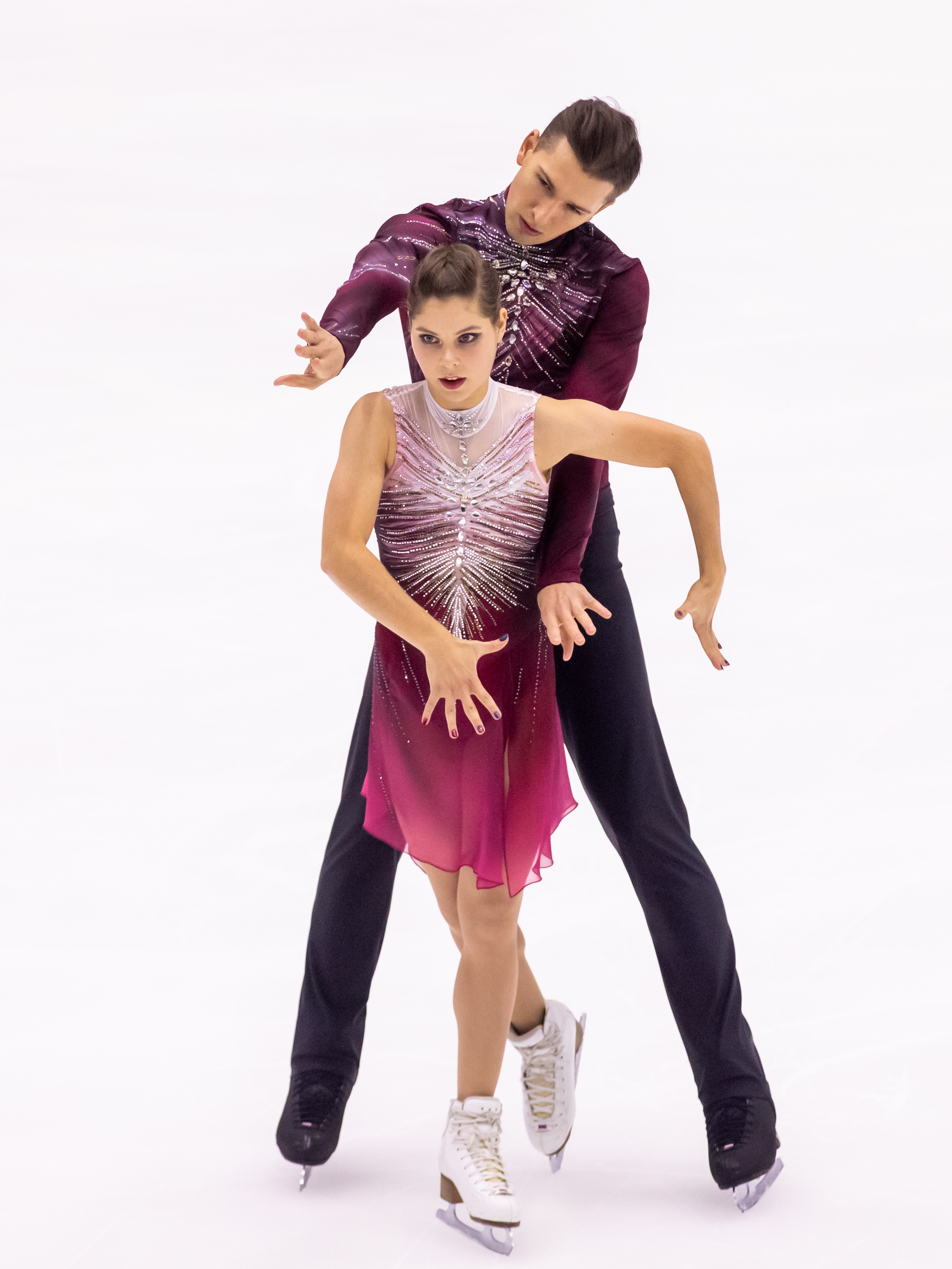
Mishina/Galliamov at Stage 4 of the 2023 Russian Cup

=== 2022–2023 season ===
Mishina/Galliamov continued to compete domestically, winning gold at both of their Russian Cup events, an all Russian Grand Prix series. They later won silver at the 2023 Russian Championships, as well as the 2023 Russian Cup Final.

=== 2023–2024 season: Two-time national champions ===
Mishina/Galliamov opened their new season winning gold at stage 2 and 4 of the Russian Cup. The pair claimed their second national title at the 2024 Russian Championships. They followed this up by winning the 2024 Russian Cup Final in February.

=== 2024–2025 season: Neutral status denied, Three-time national champions ===
Mishina/Galliamov at the 2024 Russian Figure Skating Championships

Mishina/Galliamov opened the season winning gold at stage 2 and 4 of the Russian Cup. The pair defended their national title at the 2025 Russian Championships. They finished their season by winning the 2025 Russian Cup Final. This made their second consecutive season of being undefeated in domestic competition.

Nearing the end of the season, the Figure Skating Federation of Russia and the Skating Union of Belarus were each permitted to nominate one skater or team from each discipline to participate at the Skate to Milano event as a means to qualify for the 2026 Winter Olympics as Individual Neutral Athletes (AINs). Each nominee was required to pass a special screening process to assess whether they had displayed any active support for the Russian invasion of Ukraine or any contractual links to the Russian or Belarusian military or other national security agencies. Mishina/Galliamov were named for screening to be able to secure a spot for the upcoming Games. It was later announced that the pair had failed the screening; leaving them unable to qualify for an Olympic berth.

=== 2025–2026 season ===
The pair began the season by winning silver at stage 3 and 5 of the Russian Cup. They later ended the season winning silver medals at the 2026 Russian Championships and Cup Final.

=== 2026–2027 season ===
On 30 June 2026, the International Skating Union announced that figure skaters from Russia and Belarus would be allowed to compete at international competitions as Individual Neutral Athletes (AINs). Each of these skaters are required to undergo an individual assessment conducted by the ISU Council to determine whether they meet the criteria for neutral status. Mishina/Galliamov's applications were approved, despite being previously declined. Thus, making them eligible to compete internationally as a neutral athletes.

The pair opened their season at the 2026 CS Trialeti Trophy winning the silver medal. Their results named them to the Grand Prix alternate list and they were later assigned to the Cup of China and Finlandia Trophy, replacing Izzo/Maierhofer.

In November, Mishina and Galliamov competed at 2026 Cup of China where they finished first overall. “We’re happy that we were able to perform our programs well,” said Mishina. “Of course, they weren’t perfect, but we still think we did a very good job, especially considering this was our first Grand Prix since returning to international competition. And we’re also preparing for the next Olympic cycle.”

On the November 17, the Figure Skating Federation of Russia announced that Russian citizens were denied entry into Finland, due to Finland's Ministry of Foreign Affairs imposing the restriction of Russian nationals into their country, despite having visas. "Finland has tightened restrictions on the entry of Russian citizens into the country. According to the information we received from the Finnish authorities, Russian athletes, including those in neutral status, do not meet the conditions for entry into Finland. This also applies to Russian athletes going on a Schengen visa to participate in the Finlandia Trophy tournament". Mishina/Galliamov attempted to enter the country prior to the event and were denied entry, making them unable to compete at the 2026 Finlandia Trophy.

== Programs ==
=== With Galliamov ===
Season	Short program	Free skating	Exhibition
2026–2027	Ode to Joy (Fourth Movement from Symphony No. 9 in D Minor, Op 125) by Ludwig van Beethoven choreo. by Nikolai Moroshkin	Liebestraum (Dream of Love) by Franz Liszt; Love Dreams by Rick Wakeman choreo. by Nikolai Moroshkin	
2025–2026	La traviata by Giuseppe Verdi choreo. by Albert Galichanin, Igor Kochayev	Trouble; Love Me Tender; Hound Dog by Elvis Presley	Белеет мой парус (Из к/ф "12 стульев") by Andrei Mironov; Там среди пампасов (Танго) by Valeri Zolotukhin
2024–2025	Partita for Violin No. 2: Chaconne by Johann Sebastian Bach performed by Ikuko Kawai	Smooth Criminal; Earth Song; They Don't Care About Us by Michael Jackson	
2023–2024	Ode to Joy by Ludwig van Beethoven performed by Atom Music Audio	Love's Dream (from Lisztomania) by Franz Liszt performed by Rick Wakeman	
2022–2023	The Second Waltz by Dmitri Shostakovich performed by André Rieu	Trouble; Love Me Tender; Hound Dog by Elvis Presley	
2021–2022	La Esmeralda by Cesare Pugni choreo. by Natalia Bestemianova and Igor Bobrin	The Snowstorm; Time, Forward by Georgy Sviridov choreo. by Nikolai Morozov	The Phantom of the Opera (from The Phantom of the Opera) by Andrew Lloyd Webber; Love Theme (from Love Story) by Francis Lai; Beggin' performed by Måneskin; Oh, Pretty Woman by Roy Orbison
2020–2021	La Esmeralda by Cesare Pugni choreo. by Natalia Bestemianova and Igor Bobrin	Bohemian Rhapsody; We Are the Champions by Queen choreo. by Alexander Zhulin	When I Fall in Love performed by Royal Philharmonic Orchestra; Unchained Melody performed by Chris Ingham
2019–2020	Je suis malade by Lara Fabian	The Master and Margarita by Igor Kornelyuk	Feeling Good by Muse
2018–2019	Party Like a Russian by Robbie Williams	The Master and Margarita by Igor Kornelyuk	Treasure Waltz by Johann Strauss II
2017–2018	Party Like a Russian by Robbie Williams; In the Hall of the Mountain King by Edvard Grieg	1492: Conquest of Paradise by Vangelis	L-O-V-E performed by the cast of Glee

=== With Mirzoev ===
Season	Short program	Free skating	Exhibition
2016–2017	Saragina Rumba by 17 Hippies	Attention Mesdames et Messieurs by Michel Fugain; La vie en rose performed by Andrea Bocelli feat. Edith Piaf	Mocking Song by Goran Bregović
2015–2016	Boléro by Maurice Ravel	Attention Mesdames et Messieurs by Michel Fugain; La vie en rose performed by Andrea Bocelli feat. Edith Piaf	Mocking Song by Goran Bregović
2014–2015	Story of an Unknown Actor by Alfred Schnittke	Piano Concerto by Edvard Grieg	

== Competitive highlights ==
GP: Grand Prix; CS: Challenger Series; JGP: Junior Grand Prix

=== Skating as an Individual Neutral Athlete ===
Competition placements at senior level
Season	2026–27
GP Cup of China	1st
CS Trialeti Trophy	2nd

=== With Galliamov ===
International
Event	17–18	18–19	19–20	20–21	21–22	22–23	23–24	24–25	25–26
Olympics					3rd				
Worlds				1st					
Europeans					1st				
GP Final			3rd		C				
GP France			1st						
GP NHK Trophy			3rd		1st				
GP Rostelecom				2nd	1st				
CS Alpen Trophy		1st							
CS Finlandia			1st		1st				
Bavarian Open			1st						
International: Junior
Junior Worlds	3rd	1st							
JGP Final		1st							
JGP Canada		1st							
JGP Slovakia		1st							
Golden Spin	1st								
National
Russian Champ.	7th	5th	4th	4th	1st	2nd	1st	1st	2nd
Russian Junior	2nd	1st							
Russian Cup Final (Note: The 2023 Russian Cup Final was renamed as the 2023 Russian Grand Prix Final.)			1st	1st		2nd	1st	1st	
Russian GP Stage 2							1st		
Russian GP Stage 3								1st	2nd
Russian GP Stage 4							1st		
Russian GP Stage 5								1st	
Team events
Olympics					3rd T				
World Team Trophy				1st T 1st P					

=== With Mirzoev ===
International
Event	14–15	15–16	16–17
Junior Worlds		2nd	
JGP Final			1st
JGP Russia			1st
JGP Germany			1st
JGP United States		5th	
Bavarian Open	1st J	1st J	
National
Russian Champ.			7th
Russian Jr. Champ.		1st	WD

== Detailed results ==
Small medals for short and free programs awarded only at ISU Championships.

=== Skating as an Individual Neutral Athlete ===
Results in the 2026–27 season
Date	Event	SP		FS		Total	
Date	Event	P	Score	P	Score	P	Score
Oct 1–4, 2026	(Georgia (country)) 2026 CS Trialeti Trophy	3	73.48	2	132.83	2	206.31
Nov 6–8, 2026	2026 Cup of China	1	74.69	1	135.15	1	209.84

=== Skating for Russia ===
Senior results

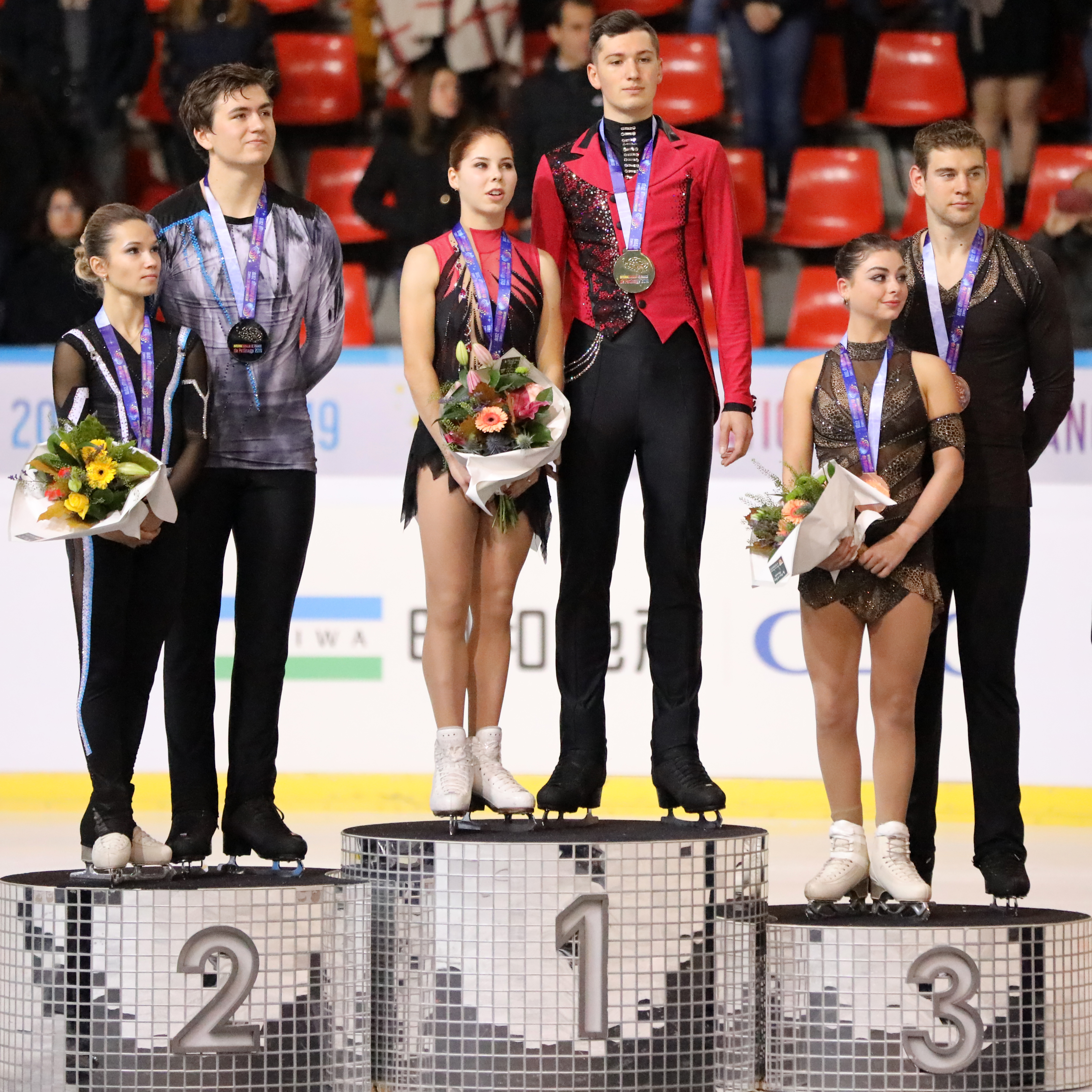
Mishina/Galliamov (center) on the 2019 Internationaux de France podium.

2025–26 season
Date	Event	SP	FS	Total
7–10 November 2025	2025 Cup of Russia Series, 3rd Stage	1; 75.77	3; 125.45	2; 201.22
2024–25 season
Date	Event	SP	FS	Total
13–17 February 2025	2025 Russian Grand Prix Final	1; 81.20	1; 150.75	1; 231.95
18–23 December 2024	2025 Russian Championships	1; 82.95	1; 156.45	1; 239.40
22–25 November 2024	2024 Cup of Russia Series, 5th Stage	2; 81.50	1; 157.55	1; 239.05
8–11 November 2024	2024 Cup of Russia Series, 3rd Stage	1; 78.69	1; 149.20	1; 227.89
2023–2024 season
Date	Event	SP	FS	Total
14–19 February 2024	2024 Russian Grand Prix Final	1; 81.46	1; 157.65	1; 239.11
20–24 December 2023	2024 Russian Championships	1; 83.01	1; 161.84	1; 244.85
2022–23 season
Date	Event	SP	FS	Total
3–5 March 2023	2023 Russian Grand Prix Final	3; 79.80	1; 159.21	2; 239.01
20–26 December 2022	2023 Russian Championships	1; 85.37	2; 148.51	2; 233.88
2021–22 season
Date	Event	SP	FS	Total
18–19 February 2022	2022 Winter Olympics	3; 82.76	3; 154.95	3; 237.71
4–7 February 2022	2022 Winter Olympics – Team event	2; 82.64	1; 145.20	3^{T}
10–16 January 2022	2022 European Championships	1; 82.36	1; 157.46	1; 239.82
21–26 December 2021	2022 Russian Championships	1; 83.74	1; 160.00	1; 243.74
26–28 November 2021	2021 Rostelecom Cup	2; 73.64	1; 153.34	1; 226.98
12–14 November 2021	2021 NHK Trophy	1; 78.40	1; 148.88	1; 227.28
7–10 October 2021	2021 CS Finlandia Trophy	2; 73.76	1; 153.37	1; 227.13
2020–21 season
Date	Event	SP	FS	Total
15–18 April 2021	2021 World Team Trophy	1; 73.77	1; 151.59	1T/1P; 225.36
22–28 March 2021	2021 World Championships	3; 75.79	1; 151.80	1; 227.59
26 Feb – 2 March 2021	2021 Russian Cup Final	1; 80.79	1; 153.69	1; 234.48
23–27 December 2020	2021 Russian Championships	5; 73.25	4; 138.70	4; 211.95
20–22 November 2020	2020 Rostelecom Cup	1; 79.34	2; 146.46	2; 225.80
2019–20 season
Date	Event	SP	FS	Total
2–9 February 2020	2020 Bavarian Open	1; 71.48	1; 130.75	1; 202.23
24–29 December 2019	2020 Russian Championships	8; 67.73	3; 145.12	4; 212.85
4–8 December 2019	2019–20 Grand Prix Final	4; 71.48	3; 131.65	3; 203.13
22–24 November 2019	2019 NHK Trophy	3; 69.00	3; 134.35	3; 203.35
1–3 November 2019	2019 Internationaux de France	2; 73.77	1; 133.81	1; 207.58
11–13 October 2019	2019 CS Finlandia Trophy	1; 74.99	1; 135.19	1; 210.18

Junior results

2018–19 season
Date	Event	Level	SP	FS	Total
4–10 March 2019	2019 World Junior Championships	Junior	3; 67.02	1; 121.72	1; 188.74
1–4 February 2019	2019 Russian Junior Championships	Junior	1; 72.44	2; 127.04	1; 199.48
19–23 December 2018	2019 Russian Championships	Senior	4; 72.85	5; 131.98	5; 204.83
6–9 December 2018	2018–19 JGP Final	Junior	3; 64.37	1; 126.26	1; 190.63
11–18 November 2018	2018 CS Alpen Trophy	Senior	1; 64.38	1; 128.37	1; 192.75
12–15 September 2018	2018 JGP Canada	Junior	1; 65.22	1; 122.49	1; 187.71
22–25 August 2018	2018 JGP Slovakia	Junior	1; 64.38	1; 120.42	1; 184.80
2017–18 season
Date	Event	Level	SP	FS	Total
5–11 March 2018	2018 World Junior Championships	Junior	4; 56.95	2; 110.29	3; 167.24
23–26 January 2018	2018 Russian Junior Championships	Junior	4; 61.93	3; 114.97	2; 176.90
21–24 December 2017	2018 Russian Championships	Senior	7; 63.85	7; 121.98	7; 185.83
6–9 December 2017	2017 Golden Spin of Zagreb	Junior	1; 59.06	1; 104.23	1; 163.29

=== With Mirzoev ===
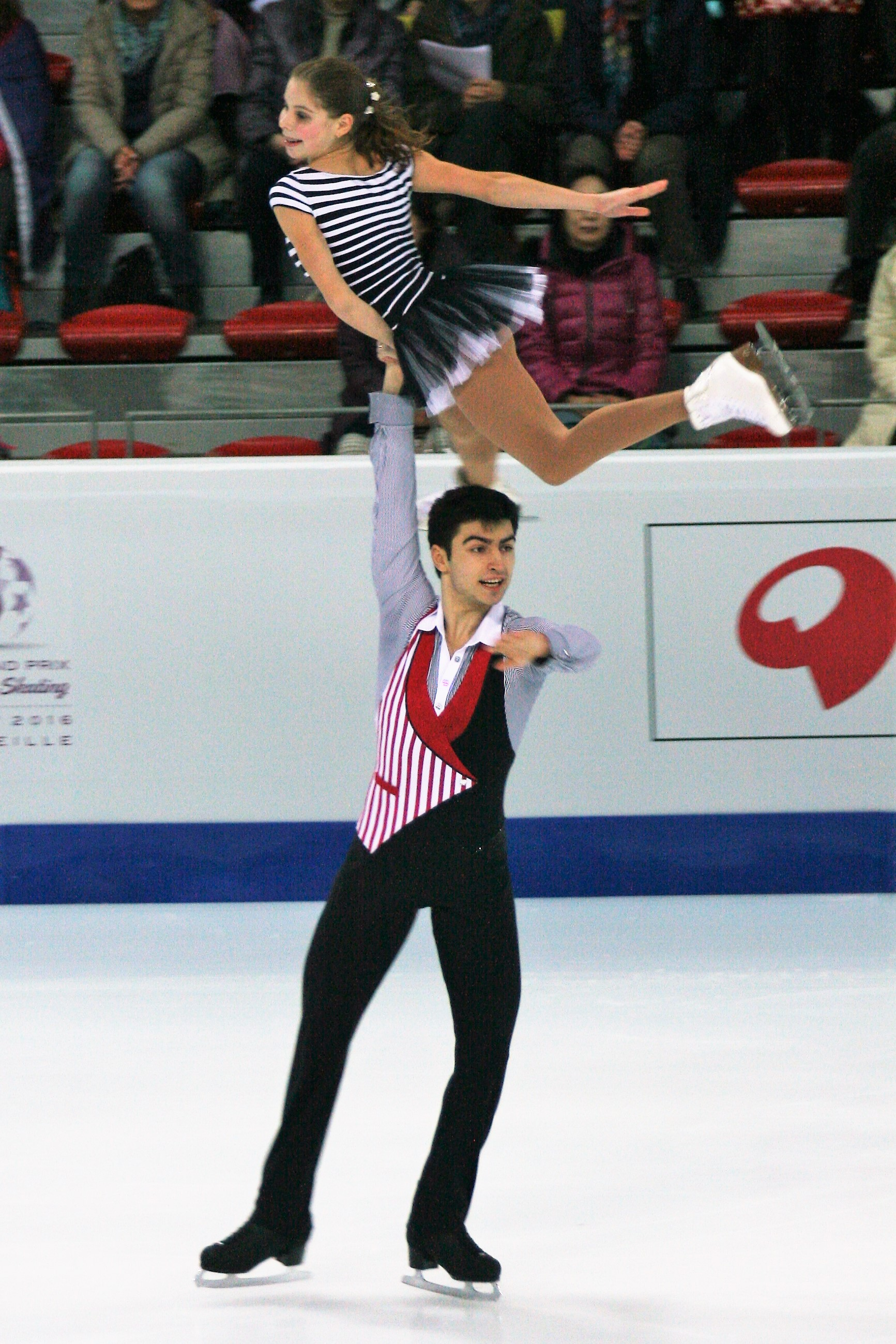
Mishina and Mirzoev executing a lift variation on their short program at the 2016–17 Junior Grand Prix Final.

2016–17 season
Date	Event	Level	SP	FS	Total
20–26 December 2016	2017 Russian Championships	Senior	7; 62.80	7; 115.46	7; 178.26
8–11 December 2016	2016–17 JGP Final	Junior	1; 64.73	1; 115.90	1; 180.63
5–9 October 2016	2016 JGP Germany	Junior	1; 62.10	1; 111.22	1; 173.32
14–18 September 2016	2016 JGP Russia	Junior	1; 63.93	1; 111.89	1; 175.82
2015–16 season
Date	Event	Level	SP	FS	Total
14–20 March 2016	2016 World Junior Championships	Junior	2; 59.50	2; 113.10	2; 172.60
17–21 February 2016	2016 Bavarian Open	Junior	2; 57.82	1; 118.02	1; 175.84
19–23 January 2016	2016 Russian Junior Championships	Junior	1; 65.45	1; 118.39	1; 183.84
2–6 September 2015	2015 JGP United States	Junior	6; 44.22	5; 83.79	5; 128.01
