= Vladislav Mirzoev =

Russian pair skater

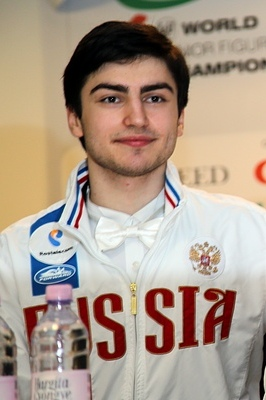
- Mishina and Mirzoev at the 2016−17 JGP Final

Personal information
- Native name: Владислав Игоревич Мирзоев
- Full name: Vladislav Igorevich Mirzoev
- Born: 21 November 1996 (age 29) Vladikavkaz, North Ossetia, Russian Federation
- Home town: Saint Petersburg
- Height: 1.78 m (5 ft 10 in)

Figure skating career
- Country: Russia
- Partner: Anastasia Mishina
- Coach: Nikolai Velikov, Ludmila Velikova
- Skating club: Olympic School St. Petersburg
- Began skating: 2007
Medal record
Representing Russia
Figure skating: Pairs
World Junior Championships
Silver medal – second place	2016 Debrecen	Pairs
Junior Grand Prix Final
Gold medal – first place	2016–17 Marseille	Pairs

Vladislav Igorevich Mirzoev (Russian: Владислав Игоревич Мирзоев, born 21 November 1996) is a Russian pair skater. With his former partner, Anastasia Mishina, he is the 2016 World Junior silver medalist and the 2016 JGP Final champion. On the national level, they are the 2016 Russian Junior champion.

== Personal life ==
Mirzoev was born on 21 November 1996 in Vladikavkaz, North Ossetia, Russian Federation. Around 2014, he enrolled at the Lesgaft Institute of Physiculture in Saint Petersburg.

== Career ==
Mirzoev began skating in 2007 after an ice rink opened in Vladikavkaz. As a singles skater, he was coached by Alexandr Mugdusov in Vladikavkaz, by Nadyr Kurbanov in Rostov-on-Don (2011–13), and by Alla Piatova in Saint Petersburg (2013–14).

=== Partnership with Mishina ===
Mirzoev began pair skating in early 2014 when he teamed up with Anastasia Mishina. Coached by Nikolai Velikov and Ludmila Velikova, they won the junior pairs' title at the 2015 Bavarian Open, their first international event.

Mishina/Mirozev made their Junior Grand Prix (JGP) debut in September 2015, placing 5th in Colorado Springs, Colorado. It was the pair's sole assignment of the 2015–16 JGP series. In January 2016, they won gold at the Russian Junior Championships after placing first in both segments and outscoring silver medalists Amina Atakhanova / Ilia Spiridonov by a margin of 6.89 points. In February, they won their second consecutive Bavarian Open junior title, finishing ahead of Renata Ohanesian / Mark Bardei (silver) by 7.12 points.

In March, Mishina/Mirzoev won the silver medal at the 2016 World Junior Championships in Debrecen, Hungary, after placing second in both segments. They finished 9.22 points behind gold medalists Anna Dušková / Martin Bidař of the Czech Republic and 3.6 points ahead of teammates Ekaterina Borisova / Dmitry Sopot.

Mishina/Mirzoev were awarded gold at both of their 2016–17 JGP assignments, in Saransk, Russia, and Dresden, Germany. They were the top qualifiers at the JGP Final and won gold at the event, which was held in December in Marseille, France.

In January 2017, Mishina stated that they would likely split, due to disagreements, but that they intended to complete the season. She said that he was struggling with her weight but that it was not possible for her to lose more.

== Programs ==
(with Mishina)

Season	Short program	Free skating	Exhibition
2016–17	Saragina Rumba by 17 Hippies	Attention Mesdames et Messieurs by Michel Fugain; La vie en rose performed by Andrea Bocelli feat. Edith Piaf	Mocking Song by Goran Bregović
2015–16	Boléro by Maurice Ravel	Attention Mesdames et Messieurs by Michel Fugain; La vie en rose performed by Andrea Bocelli feat. Edith Piaf	Mocking Song by Goran Bregović
2014–2015	Story of an Unknown Actor by Alfred Schnittke	Piano Concerto by Edvard Grieg	

== Competitive highlights ==
JGP: Junior Grand Prix

With Mishina

International
Event	2014–15	2015–16	2016–17
Junior Worlds		2nd	
JGP Final			1st
JGP Russia			1st
JGP Germany			1st
JGP United States		5th	
Bavarian Open	1st J	1st J	
National
Russian Champ.			7th
Russian Jr. Champ.		1st	WD
J = Junior level; TBD = Assigned; WD = Withdrew

== Detailed results ==
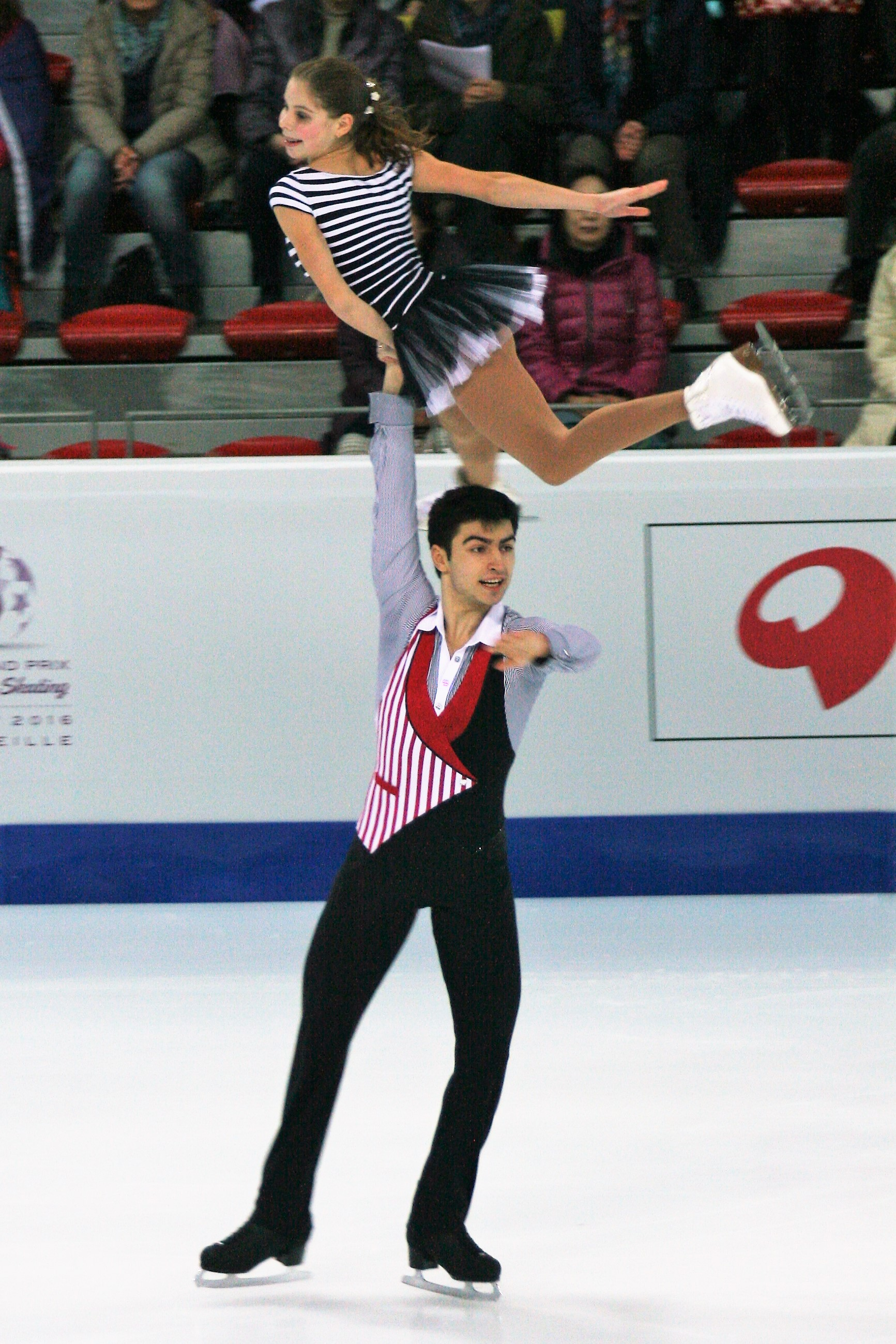
Mishina and Mirzoev executing a lift variation on their short program at the 2016−17 Junior Grand Prix Final.

With Mishina

2016–17 season
Date	Event	Level	SP	FS	Total
20–26 December 2016	2017 Russian Championships	Senior	7; 62.80	7; 115.46	7; 178.26
8–11 December 2016	2016−17 JGP Final	Junior	1; 64.73	1; 115.90	1; 180.63
5–9 October 2016	2016 JGP Germany	Junior	1; 62.10	1; 111.22	1; 173.32
14–18 September 2016	2016 JGP Russia	Junior	1; 63.93	1; 111.89	1; 175.82
2015–16 season
Date	Event	Level	SP	FS	Total
14–20 March 2016	2016 World Junior Championships	Junior	2; 59.50	2; 113.10	2; 172.60
17–21 February 2016	2016 Bavarian Open	Junior	2; 57.82	1; 118.02	1; 175.84
19–23 January 2016	2016 Russian Junior Championships	Junior	1; 65.45	1; 118.39	1; 183.84
2–6 September 2015	2015 JGP United States	Junior	6; 44.22	5; 83.79	5; 128.01
