= Aleksandr Galliamov =

Russian pair skater (born 1999)

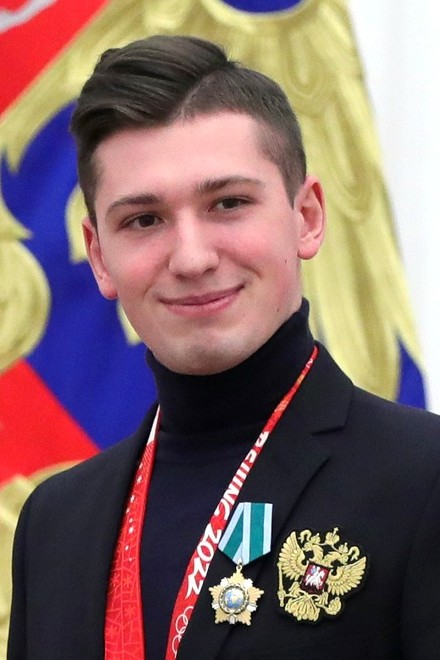
- Galliamov in 2022

Personal information
- Native name: Александр Романович Галлямов
- Full name: Aleksandr Romanovich Galliamov
- Other names: Aleksandr Galiamov
- Born: 28 August 1999 (age 27) Berezniki, Russia
- Home town: Saint Petersburg, Russia
- Height: 1.86 m (6 ft 1 in)

Figure skating career
- Country: (Individual Neutral Athletes) Individual Neutral Athlete; Russia
- Partner: Anastasia Mishina
- Coach: Tamara Moskvina; Artur Minchuk; Nikolai Moroshkin
- Skating club: Tamara Moskvina Figure Skating Club
- Began skating: 2005
Medal record
Figure skating: Pairs
Representing ROC (with Mishina)
Olympic Games
| Bronze medal – third place | 2022 Beijing | Team (Note: On 29 January 2024 CAS disqualified Valieva for four years retroactive to 25 December 2021 for an anti-doping rule violation. On 30 January 2024 the ISU reallocated medals to upgrade the United States to gold and Japan to silver while downgrading ROC to bronze.) |
| Bronze medal – third place | 2022 Beijing | Pairs |
Representing FSR (with Mishina)
World Championships
| Gold medal – first place | 2021 Stockholm | Pairs |
Representing Russia (with Mishina)
European Championships
| Gold medal – first place | 2022 Tallinn | Pairs |
World Team Trophy
| Gold medal – first place | 2021 Osaka | Team |
Russian Championships
| Gold medal – first place | 2022 Saint Petersburg | Pairs |
| Gold medal – first place | 2024 Chelyabinsk | Pairs |
| Gold medal – first place | 2025 Omsk | Pairs |
| Silver medal – second place | 2023 Krasnoyarsk | Pairs |
World Junior Championships
| Gold medal – first place | 2019 Zagreb | Pairs |
| Bronze medal – third place | 2018 Sofia | Pairs |
Junior Grand Prix Final
| Gold medal – first place | 2018–19 Vancouver | Pairs |

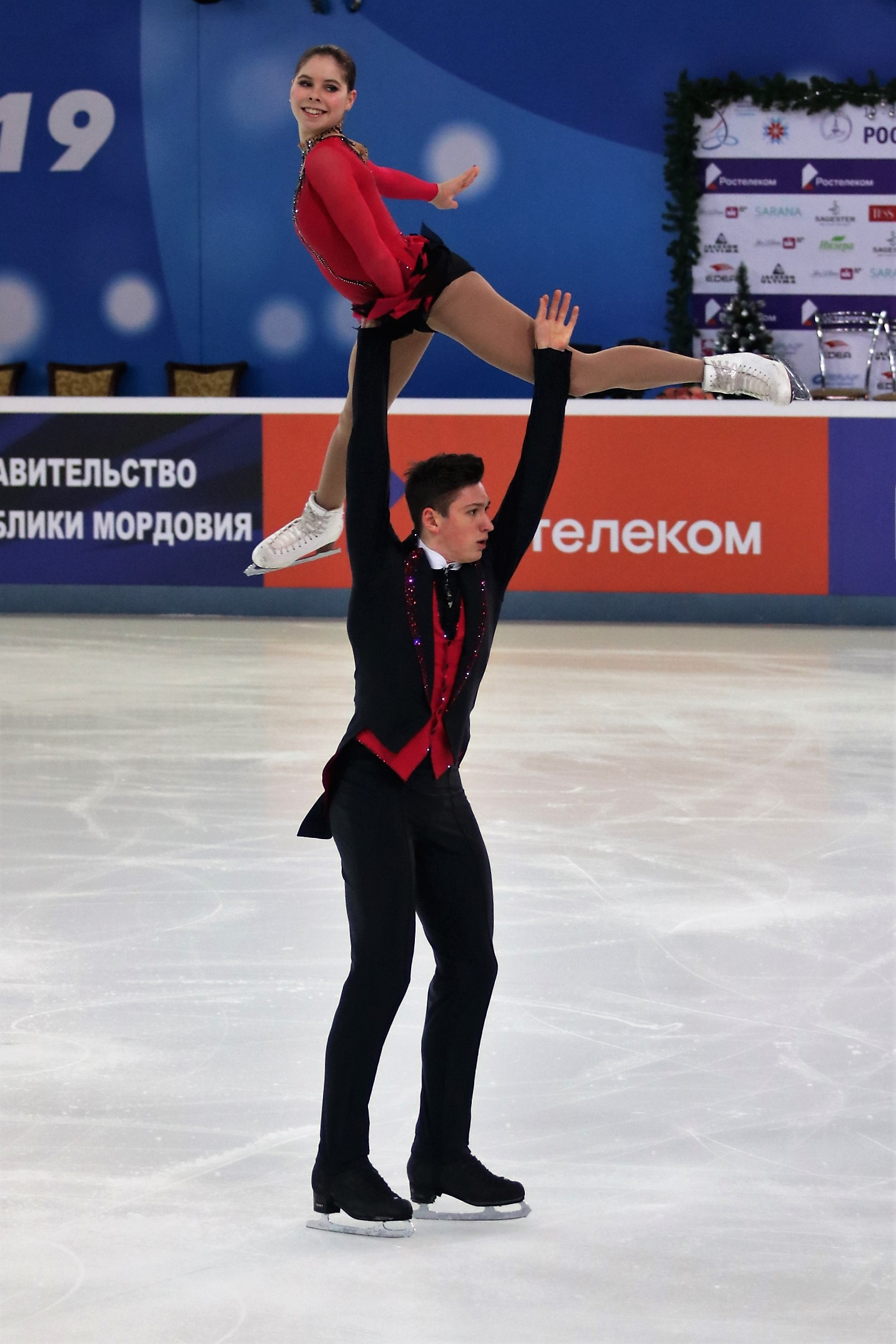
Mishina/Galiamov at the 2019 Russian Figure Skating Championships

Aleksandr Romanovich Galliamov (Russian: Александр Романович Галлямов, born 28 August 1999) is a Russian pair skater who currently competes as an Individual Neutral Athlete. With his skating partner, Anastasia Mishina, he is a 2022 Olympic pairs bronze medalist, 2022 Olympic bronze medalist in the team event, 2021 World champion, the 2022 European champion, the 2019–20 Grand Prix Final bronze medalist, a three-time Grand Prix event champion, and a three-time Russian national champion (2022, 2024-25). He is also the 2019 World Junior champion, the 2018 World Junior bronze medalist, 2018–19 Junior Grand Prix Final champion, and 2019 Russian national junior champion.

Mishina/Galliamov won the gold medal in their Worlds debut at the 2021 World Championships, becoming the second youngest pair to win the World Championships after Ekaterina Gordeeva / Sergei Grinkov.

== Personal life ==
Galliamov was born on 28 August 1999 in Berezniki, Russia. In December 2022, the Ukrainian Parliament sanctioned Galliamov for his support of the 2022 Russian invasion of Ukraine.

== Career ==
=== Early years ===
Galliamov began learning to skate in 2005. He was a single skater until 2014 when he switched to pair skating and moved to Saint Petersburg. He and his first partner, Alexandra Polishchuk, skated together through the 2015–2016 season. He competed with his next partner, Nika Osipova, during the 2016–2017 season.

=== 2017–2018 season: Partnership with Mishina ===
Galliamov teamed up with Anastasia Mishina in February 2017. Coached by Nikolai Velikov and Ludmila Velikova, the pair won the junior title at the 2017 Golden Spin of Zagreb, their first international event.

Mishina/Galliamov placed seventh at the 2018 Russian Championships and took silver at the junior event. In March 2018, they won bronze at the 2018 World Junior Championships in Sofia, Bulgaria. They were part of a Russian sweep of the pairs' podium, along with their training partners Polina Kostiukovich / Dmitrii Ialin (silver) and Daria Pavliuchenko / Denis Khodykin (gold).

=== 2018–2019 season: Junior World title ===
Mishina/Galliamov started their season by competing in the 2018 JGP series. At their first JGP event of the season, they won the gold medal in Bratislava, Slovakia. They were ranked first in both the short program and the free skate and won the gold medal by a margin of more than 11 points over the silver medalists, their teammates Apollinariia Panfilova / Dmitry Rylov. At their second JGP event of the season they won another gold medal, now in Vancouver, Canada. Again they were ranked first in both the short program and the free skate, and again they beat the same silver medalists, Panfilova/Rylov. This time they beat them by about 10 points. Mishina/Galliamov also upgraded their earlier short program, free skate, and combined total record scores. With two JGP gold medals, they qualified for the 2018–19 Junior Grand Prix Final.

Mishina/Galliamov made their international senior debut at the 2018 CS Alpen Trophy, where they won the gold medal with a personal best score of 192.75 points.

At the JGP Final, Mishina/Galliamov won the gold medal after placing third in the short program and first in the free skate. They were part of a Russian sweep of the pairs' podium. Mishina/Galliamov beat the bronze medalists, Panfilova/Rylov, by about 4 points, but the race for the gold medal was tight. Mishina/Galliamov won the gold medal by a margin of only 1.1 points over the silver medalists, their training partners Kostiukovich/Ialin. At this event, Mishina/Galliamov also upgraded their junior-level pairs' record for the combined total (190.63 points) and free program (126.26 points).

At the 2019 Russian Championships, they competed as seniors domestically, placing fourth in the short program with upgraded jump and throw content. They slipped to fifth place overall after placing fifth in the free skate when Mishina fell on the side-by-side combination jump attempt. Mishina/Galliamov subsequently won the Russian junior national title.

Assigned to the 2019 World Junior Championships, Mishina/Galliamov placed third in the short program after Galliamov struggled on their side-by-side spin. They won the free skate, despite another fall by Mishina on the jump combination, and narrowly took gold over Panfilova/Rylov by a margin of 0.57 points. Galliamov said that being third after the short program had motivated them to perform better in the free.

=== 2019–2020 season: Grand Prix Final bronze ===
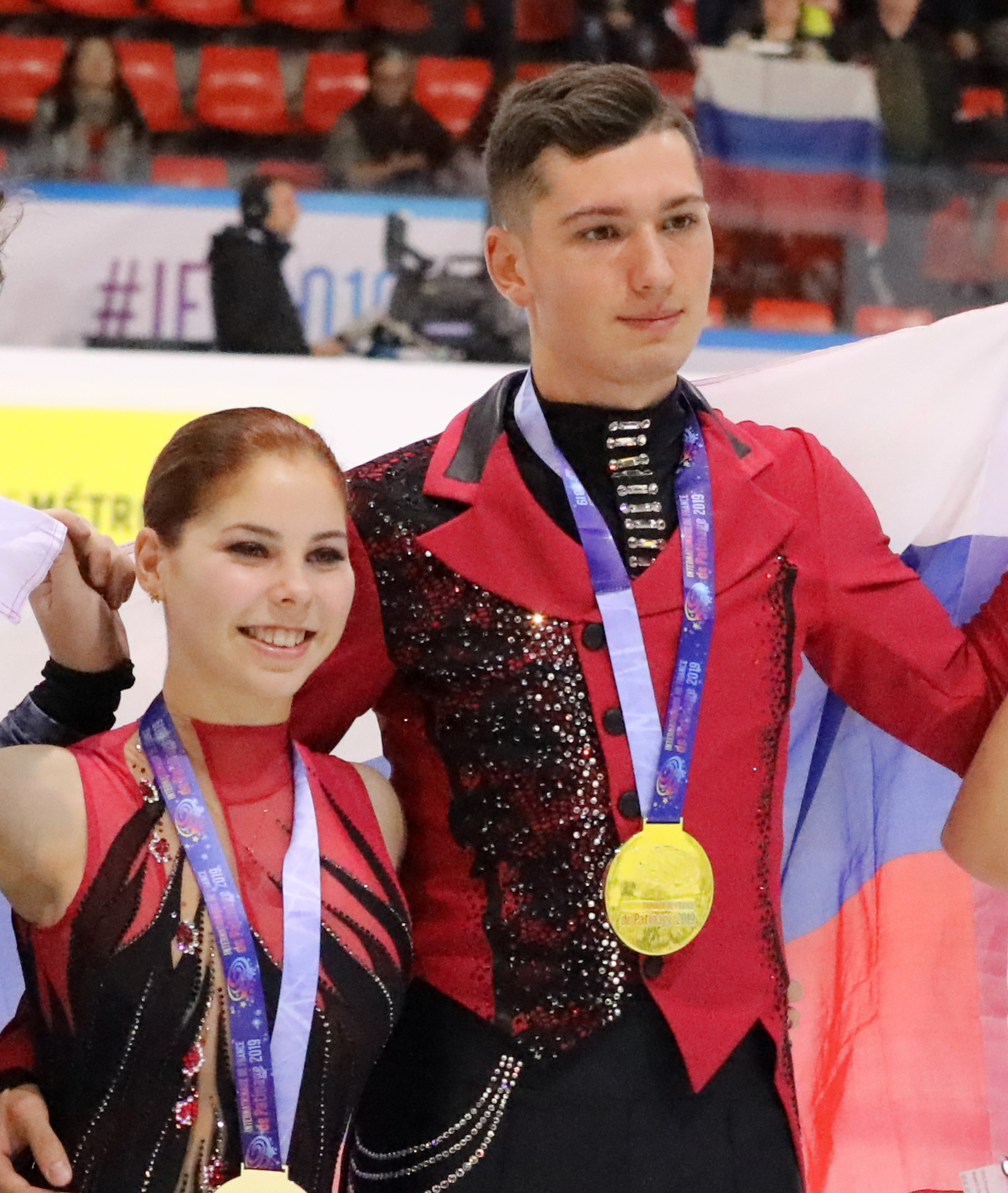
Mishina/Galliamov at the 2019 Internationaux de France podium.

Mishina/Galliamov began their first full senior season on the Challenger series, competing and winning at the 2019 CS Finlandia Trophy after placing first in both segments.

Making their senior Grand Prix debut at the 2019 Internationaux de France, Mishina/Galliamov were second in the short program behind Daria Pavliuchenko / Denis Khodykin. They won the free skate to take the gold medal, despite Mishina botching their planned three-jump combination. At their second Grand Prix, the 2019 NHK Trophy, they placed third in the short program after a jump problem from Galliamov. They were clean in the free skate, winning the bronze medal and qualifying for the Grand Prix Final. Competing at the Final, Mishina/Galliamov were fourth in the short program, skating cleanly but for their side-by-side spins not receiving a level due to errors. Third in the free skate, they won the bronze medal overall, the highest-ranked Russian team in the competition.

Mishina/Galliamov ran into trouble in the short program at the 2020 Russian Championships, with Mishina falling on their throw triple flip, stumbling in the step sequence, and exiting the pair spin too early. Consequently, they placed eighth in the segment. The free skate proved much more successful, with them placing third and rising to fourth place overall. She observed, "we were not in a good mood, but we were able to recover."

=== 2020–2021 season: World champions ===
In the spring of 2020, Mishina/Galliamov moved to train under Tamara Moskvina, the coach of numerous Olympic pairs champions, and choreographer Alexander Stepin. They debuted their programs at the senior Russian test skates, earning particular notice for an innovative lift in their short program to Cesare Pugni's La Esmeralda. They were scheduled to compete in the second stage of the domestic Russian Cup, but had to withdraw after Galliamov contracted COVID-19. Subsequently, they were able to compete in the fourth stage of the Russian Cup in Kazan, winning the gold medal over former national champions Tarasova/Morozov and their fellow Moskvina students Boikova/Kozlovskii.

Competing on the Grand Prix at the 2020 Rostelecom Cup shortly after that, they placed first in the short program, narrowly ahead of Boikova/Kozlovskii, after both teams made errors. In the free skate, Mishina singled a planned triple Salchow, resulting in a second-place finish in that segment and the silver medal overall, behind Boikova/Kozlovskii.

At the 2021 Russian Championships, Mishina/Galliamov entered with expectations of vying for the top of the podium but encountered problems in the short program when Galliamov skated through his attempt at a side-by-side jump. As a result, they placed fifth in that segment. The free skate also proved difficult, with both making jump errors and Galliamov almost dropping Mishina in their final lift. Galliamov was uncertain as to why they had performed poorly but suggested his being unwell the week before may have been a factor.

Following their disappointment at the national championships, Mishina/Galliamov participated in the 2021 Channel One Trophy, a televised competition organized in lieu of the cancelled European Championships. They were selected for the Time of Firsts team captained by Evgenia Medvedeva and placed second in both segments, while the team finished in second place. After this, they competed at the Russian Cup Final, which was widely viewed as a contest between them and national bronze medalists Pavliuchenko/Khodykin for the third Russian pairs berth at the 2021 World Championships in Stockholm. Mishina/Galliamov won both segments of the competition to take the gold medal, their only minor mistake being a free skate jump step out from Mishina.

At the 2021 World Championships in March, Mishina/Galliamov skated both of their programs cleanly to earn new personal bests in both individual segments as well as overall. In the short program, the team ranked third behind training-mates Boikova/Kozlovskii in first and Chinese team Sui/Han in second, but in the free skate overtook the two leading teams to win the segment and claim the title unexpectedly. Mishina/Galliamov are the first team to win gold in their Worlds debut since Gordeeva/Grinkov of the Soviet Union in 1986, and the second-youngest pair to win Worlds after Gordeeva/Grinkov. They then concluded the season at the 2021 World Team Trophy, where they easily placed first in both segments to help Team Russia win the gold medal.

=== 2021–2022 season: Beijing Olympics ===
Entering the Olympic season as the reigning World Champions, Mishina and Galliamov opted to retain their La Esmeralda program from the previous season, with revisions to account for new technical elements and choreography. Coach Moskvina designed their new free program to the music of Georgi Sviridov to express how "the youth is striving for something new and different than the past generation." Making their season debut at the 2021 CS Finlandia Trophy, they won the gold medal over rivals Tarasova/Morozov.

At their first Grand Prix assignment, the 2021 NHK Trophy, Mishina/Galliamov won both segments of the competition to take the gold medal, again over Tarasova/Morozov. They skated without error in the short program and, in the free skate, had only a minor issue with the landing of their throw triple loop, requiring Mishina to put a hand down. Galliamov said they were "satisfied" with the result but "not the maximum yet; there is still room to grow." At their second event, the 2021 Rostelecom Cup, they were second in the short program after a jump error but won the free skate easily to take another gold medal. The results qualified them for the Grand Prix Final, to be held in Osaka, but it was subsequently cancelled due to restrictions prompted by the Omicron variant.

At the 2022 Russian Championships, Mishina/Galliamov placed first in both segments of the competition to take the gold medal, 3.87 points ahead of silver medalists and training partner rivals Boikova/Kozlovskii. Mishina remarked afterward, "out of principle, we wanted to be on the podium here. This is our fourth time at Nationals, and we've never made the podium before, and I didn't make it with my previous partner either."

Making their European Championship debut at the 2022 edition in Tallinn, Mishina/Galliamov won the short program, prevailing over a clean skate by Tarasova/Morozov by 0.78 points, and breaking their training partners Boikova/Kozlovskii's world record in the process. Clean in the free skate as well, they won the gold medal and broke Chinese pair Sui/Han's world record in that segment. Despite this, Mishina said, "we don't really pay attention to the scores and haven't even seen the protocols, but this isn't the best we can do. We can still do better than that." On 20 January, they were officially named to the Russian Olympic team.

Mishina/Galliamov began the Olympic Games as the Russian entry in the pairs' short program of the Olympic team event, facing off against Chinese rivals Sui/Han for the first time since the 2021 World Championships. Both teams skated cleanly, with Sui/Han reclaiming their world record with a new high score of 82.83. Mishina/Galliamov scored 82.64, 0.19 less. This result secured nine points for the Russian team. They also performed in the free skate segment, winning it despite a double-fall on their final lift, together with the rest of Team Russia, won the gold medal. In the pairs event, Mishina/Galliamov skated two clean programs to win the bronze medal, with a total score 2.17 points back of gold medalists Sui/Han and 1.54 points behind silver medalists Tarasova Morozov. Mishina said afterward that while they had hoped to win, "we were just happy with the fact that we managed to do everything well. If an athlete does everything that he can, there is more happiness than disappointment. We will keep working. Third place gives us motivation to work harder."

In early March 2022, the ISU banned all figure skaters and officials from Russia and Belarus from attending the World Championships due to the Russian invasion of Ukraine; therefore Mishina/Galliamov were not allowed to participate and defend their title.

=== 2022–2023 season ===
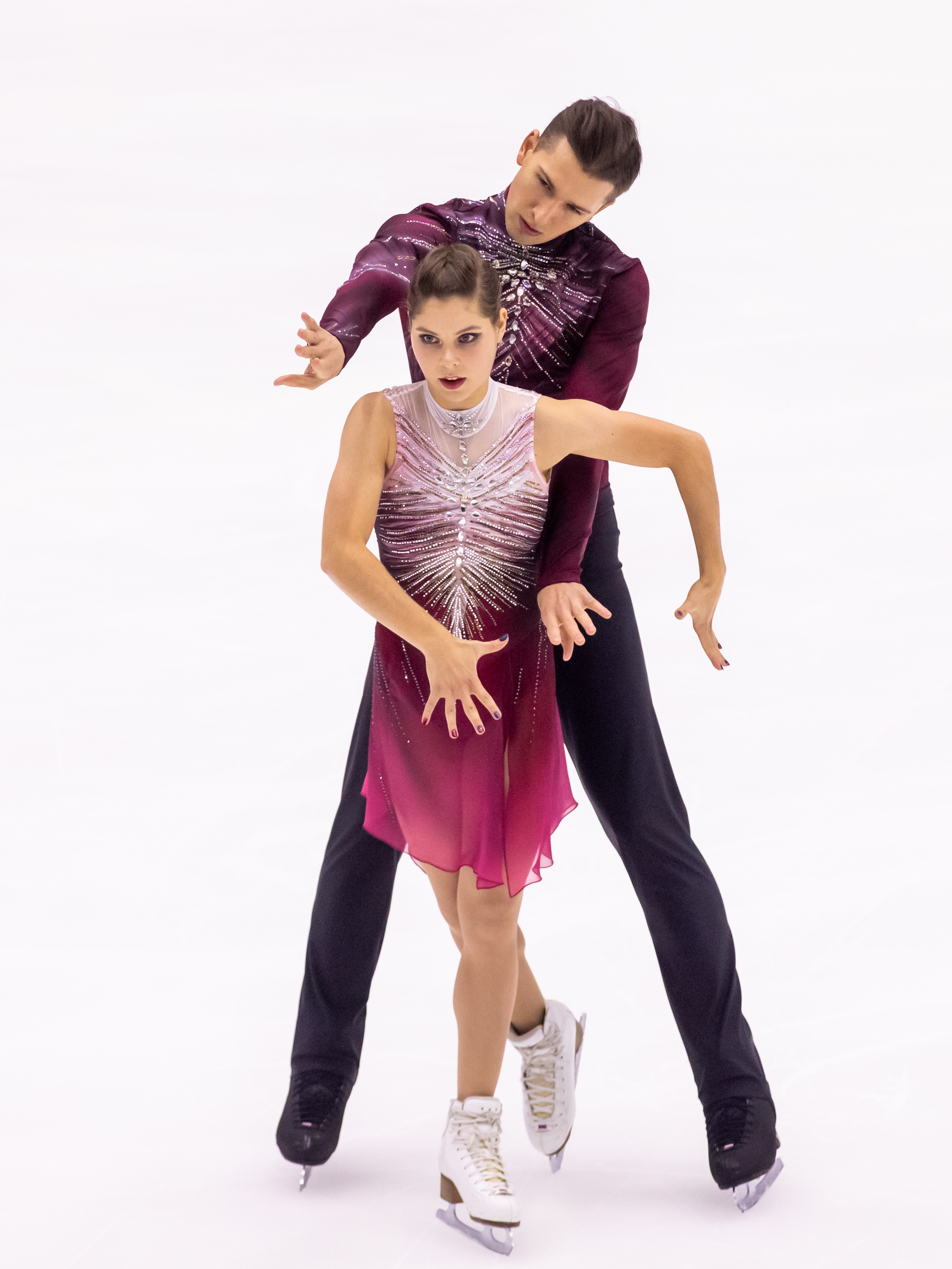
Mishina/Galliamov at Stage 4 of the 2023 Russian Cup

Mishina/Galliamov continued to compete domestically, winning gold at both of their Russian Cup events, an all Russian Grand Prix

series. They later won silver at the 2023 Russian Championships, as well as the 2023 Russian Cup Final.

=== 2023–2024 season: Two-time national champions ===
Mishina/Galliamov opened their new season winning gold at stage 2 and 4 of the Russian Cup. The pair claimed their second national title at the 2024 Russian Championships. They followed this up by winning the 2024 Russian Cup Final in February.

=== 2024–2025 season: Neutral status denied, Three-time national champions ===
Mishina/Galliamov at the 2024 Russian Figure Skating Championships

Mishina/Galliamov opened the season winning gold at stage 2 and 4 of the Russian Cup. The pair defended their national title at the 2025 Russian Championships. They finished their season by winning the 2025 Russian Cup Final. This made their second consecutive season of being undefeated in domestic competition.

Nearing the end of the season, the Figure Skating Federation of Russia and the Skating Union of Belarus were each permitted to nominate one skater or team from each discipline to participate at the Skate to Milano event as a means to qualify for the 2026 Winter Olympics as Individual Neutral Athletes (AINs). Each nominee was required to pass a special screening process to assess whether they had displayed any active support for the Russian invasion of Ukraine or any contractual links to the Russian or Belarusian military or other national security agencies. Mishina/Galliamov were named for screening to be able to secure a spot for the upcoming Games. It was later announced that the pair had failed the screening; leaving them unable to qualify for an Olympic berth.

=== 2025–2026 season ===
The pair began the season by winning silver at stage 3 and 5 of the Russian Cup. They later ended the season winning silver medals at the 2026 Russian Championships and Cup Final.

=== 2026–2027 season ===
On 30 June 2026, the International Skating Union announced that figure skaters from Russia and Belarus would be allowed to compete at international competitions as Individual Neutral Athletes (AINs). Each of these skaters are required to undergo an individual assessment conducted by the ISU Council to determine whether they meet the criteria for neutral status. Mishina/Galliamov's applications were approved, despite being previously declined. Thus, making them eligible to compete internationally as a neutral athletes.

The pair opened their season at the 2026 CS Trialeti Trophy winning the silver medal. Their results named them to the Grand Prix alternate list and they were later assigned to the Cup of China and Finlandia Trophy, replacing Izzo/Maierhofer.

In November, Mishina and Galliamov competed at 2026 Cup of China where they finished first overall. “We’re happy that we were able to perform our programs well,” said Mishina. “Of course, they weren’t perfect, but we still think we did a very good job, especially considering this was our first Grand Prix since returning to international competition. And we’re also preparing for the next Olympic cycle.”

On the November 17, the Figure Skating Federation of Russia announced that Russian citizens were denied entry into Finland, due to Finland's Ministry of Foreign Affairs imposing the restriction of Russian nationals into their country, despite having visas. "Finland has tightened restrictions on the entry of Russian citizens into the country. According to the information we received from the Finnish authorities, Russian athletes, including those in neutral status, do not meet the conditions for entry into Finland. This also applies to Russian athletes going on a Schengen visa to participate in the Finlandia Trophy tournament". Mishina/Galliamov attempted to enter the country prior to the event and were denied entry, making them unable to compete at the 2026 Finlandia Trophy.

== Programs ==
=== With Mishina ===
| Season | Short program | Free skating | Exhibition |
|---|---|---|---|
| 2026–2027 | Ode to Joy (Fourth Movement from Symphony No. 9 in D Minor, Op 125) by Ludwig van Beethoven choreo. by Nikolai Moroshkin | Liebestraum (Dream of Love) by Franz Liszt; Love Dreams by Rick Wakeman choreo. by Nikolai Moroshkin | |
| 2025–2026 | La traviata by Giuseppe Verdi choreo. by Albert Galichanin, Igor Kochayev | Trouble; Love Me Tender; Hound Dog by Elvis Presley | Белеет мой парус (Из к/ф "12 стульев") by Andrei Mironov; Там среди пампасов (Танго) by Valeri Zolotukhin |
| 2024–2025 | Partita for Violin No. 2: Chaconne by Johann Sebastian Bach performed by Ikuko Kawai | Smooth Criminal; Earth Song; They Don't Care About Us by Michael Jackson | |
| 2023–2024 | Ode to Joy by Ludwig van Beethoven performed by Atom Music Audio | Love's Dream (from Lisztomania) by Franz Liszt performed by Rick Wakeman | |
| 2022–2023 | The Second Waltz by Dmitri Shostakovich performed by André Rieu | Trouble; Love Me Tender; Hound Dog by Elvis Presley | |
| 2021–2022 | La Esmeralda by Cesare Pugni choreo. by Natalia Bestemianova and Igor Bobrin | The Snowstorm; Time, Forward by Georgy Sviridov choreo. by Nikolai Morozov | The Phantom of the Opera (from The Phantom of the Opera) by Andrew Lloyd Webber; Love Theme (from Love Story) by Francis Lai; Beggin' performed by Måneskin; Oh, Pretty Woman by Roy Orbison |
| 2020–2021 | La Esmeralda by Cesare Pugni choreo. by Natalia Bestemianova and Igor Bobrin | Bohemian Rhapsody; We Are the Champions by Queen choreo. by Alexander Zhulin | When I Fall in Love performed by Royal Philharmonic Orchestra; Unchained Melody performed by Chris Ingham |
| 2019–2020 | Je suis malade by Lara Fabian | The Master and Margarita by Igor Kornelyuk | Feeling Good by Muse |
| 2018–2019 | Party Like a Russian by Robbie Williams | The Master and Margarita by Igor Kornelyuk | Treasure Waltz by Johann Strauss II |
| 2017–2018 | Party Like a Russian by Robbie Williams; In the Hall of the Mountain King by Edvard Grieg | 1492: Conquest of Paradise by Vangelis | L-O-V-E performed by the cast of Glee |

== Records and achievements ==
(with Mishina)

- Set the junior-level pairs' record of the new +5 / -5 GOE (Grade of Execution) system for the combined total (184.80 points), short program (64.38 points) and free program (120.42 points) at the 2018 JGP Slovakia.
- They became the first junior pair to score above 120 points in the free skate and above 180 points in combined total at the 2018 JGP Slovakia.
- Upgraded their junior-level pairs' record for the combined total (187.71 points), short program (65.22 points) and free program (122.49 points) at the 2018 JGP Canada.
- Upgraded their junior-level pairs' record for the combined total (190.63 points) and free program (126.26 points) at the 2018–19 JGP Final.
- They became the first junior pair to score above 190 points in combined total at the 2018–19 JGP Final.

== Competitive highlights ==
GP: Grand Prix; CS: Challenger Series; JGP: Junior Grand Prix

=== Skating as an Individual Neutral Athlete ===
Competition placements at senior level
| Season | 2026–27 |
|---|---|
| GP Cup of China | 1st |
| CS Trialeti Trophy | 2nd |

=== With Mishina ===
International
| Event | 17–18 | 18–19 | 19–20 | 20–21 | 21–22 | 22–23 | 23–24 | 24–25 | 25–26 |
|---|---|---|---|---|---|---|---|---|---|
| Olympics | | | | | 3rd | | | | |
| Worlds | | | | 1st | | | | | |
| Europeans | | | | | 1st | | | | |
| GP Final | | | 3rd | | C | | | | |
| GP France | | | 1st | | | | | | |
| GP NHK Trophy | | | 3rd | | 1st | | | | |
| GP Rostelecom | | | | 2nd | 1st | | | | |
| CS Alpen Trophy | | 1st | | | | | | | |
| CS Finlandia | | | 1st | | 1st | | | | |
| Bavarian Open | | | 1st | | | | | | |
International: Junior
| Junior Worlds | 3rd | 1st | | | | | | | |
| JGP Final | | 1st | | | | | | | |
| JGP Canada | | 1st | | | | | | | |
| JGP Slovakia | | 1st | | | | | | | |
| Golden Spin | 1st | | | | | | | | |
National
| Russian Champ. | 7th | 5th | 4th | 4th | 1st | 2nd | 1st | 1st | 2nd |
| Russian Junior | 2nd | 1st | | | | | | | |
| Russian Cup Final (Note: The 2023 Russian Cup Final was renamed as the 2023 Russian Grand Prix Final.) | | | 1st | 1st | | 2nd | 1st | 1st | |
| Russian GP Stage 2 | | | | | | | 1st | | |
| Russian GP Stage 3 | | | | | | | | 1st | 2nd |
| Russian GP Stage 4 | | | | | | | 1st | | |
| Russian GP Stage 5 | | | | | | | | 1st | |
Team events
| Olympics | | | | | 3rd T | | | | |
| World Team Trophy | | | | 1st T 1st P | | | | | |

=== With Osipova ===
International
| Event | 2016–17 |
|---|---|
| Volvo Open Cup | 1st J |
National
| Russian Junior Championships | 9th |
| Russian Cup Final | 3rd J |
J = Junior level

== Detailed results ==
Small medals for short and free programs awarded only at ISU Championships.

=== Skating as an Individual Neutral Athlete ===
Results in the 2026–27 season
| Date | Event | SP | | FS | | Total | |
| Date | Event | P | Score | P | Score | P | Score |
|---|---|---|---|---|---|---|---|
| Oct 1-4, 2026 | (Georgia (country)) 2026 CS Trialeti Trophy | 3 | 73.48 | 2 | 132.83 | 2 | 206.31 |
| Nov 6–8, 2026 | 2026 Cup of China | 1 | 74.69 | 1 | 135.15 | 1 | 209.84 |

=== Skating for Russia ===
Senior results

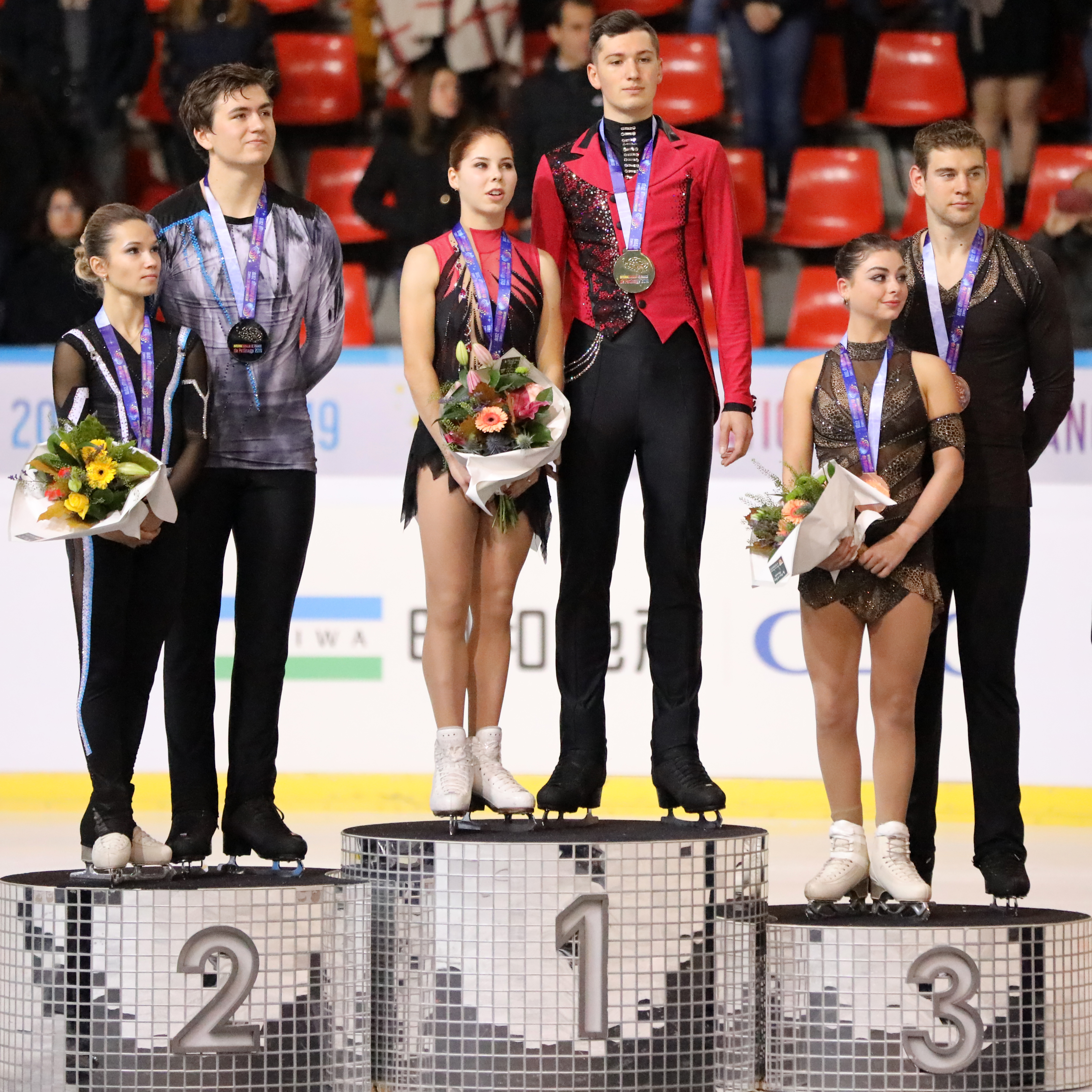
Mishina/Galliamov (center) on the 2019 Internationaux de France podium.

2025–26 season
| Date | Event | SP | FS | Total |
| 7-10 November 2025 | 2025 Cup of Russia Series, 3rd Stage | 1; 75.77 | 3; 125.45 | 2; 201.22 |
2024–25 season
| Date | Event | SP | FS | Total |
| 13-17 February 2025 | 2025 Russian Grand Prix Final | 1; 81.20 | 1; 150.75 | 1; 231.95 |
| 18-23 December 2024 | 2025 Russian Championships | 1; 82.95 | 1; 156.45 | 1; 239.40 |
| 22-25 November 2024 | 2024 Cup of Russia Series, 5th Stage | 2; 81.50 | 1; 157.55 | 1; 239.05 |
| 8-11 November 2024 | 2024 Cup of Russia Series, 3rd Stage | 1; 78.69 | 1; 149.20 | 1; 227.89 |
2023–2024 season
| Date | Event | SP | FS | Total |
| 14–19 February 2024 | 2024 Russian Grand Prix Final | 1; 81.46 | 1; 157.65 | 1; 239.11 |
| 20–24 December 2023 | 2024 Russian Championships | 1; 83.01 | 1; 161.84 | 1; 244.85 |
2022–23 season
| Date | Event | SP | FS | Total |
| 3–5 March 2023 | 2023 Russian Grand Prix Final | 3; 79.80 | 1; 159.21 | 2; 239.01 |
| 20–26 December 2022 | 2023 Russian Championships | 1; 85.37 | 2; 148.51 | 2; 233.88 |
2021–22 season
| Date | Event | SP | FS | Total |
| 18–19 February 2022 | 2022 Winter Olympics | 3; 82.76 | 3; 154.95 | 3; 237.71 |
| 4–7 February 2022 | 2022 Winter Olympics – Team event | 2; 82.64 | 1; 145.20 | 3^{T} |
| 10–16 January 2022 | 2022 European Championships | 1; 82.36 | 1; 157.46 | 1; 239.82 |
| 21–26 December 2021 | 2022 Russian Championships | 1; 83.74 | 1; 160.00 | 1; 243.74 |
| 26–28 November 2021 | 2021 Rostelecom Cup | 2; 73.64 | 1; 153.34 | 1; 226.98 |
| 12–14 November 2021 | 2021 NHK Trophy | 1; 78.40 | 1; 148.88 | 1; 227.28 |
| 7–10 October 2021 | 2021 CS Finlandia Trophy | 2; 73.76 | 1; 153.37 | 1; 227.13 |
2020–21 season
| Date | Event | SP | FS | Total |
| 15–18 April 2021 | 2021 World Team Trophy | 1; 73.77 | 1; 151.59 | 1T/1P; 225.36 |
| 22–28 March 2021 | 2021 World Championships | 3; 75.79 | 1; 151.80 | 1; 227.59 |
| 26 Feb – 2 March 2021 | 2021 Russian Cup Final | 1; 80.79 | 1; 153.69 | 1; 234.48 |
| 23–27 December 2020 | 2021 Russian Championships | 5; 73.25 | 4; 138.70 | 4; 211.95 |
| 20–22 November 2020 | 2020 Rostelecom Cup | 1; 79.34 | 2; 146.46 | 2; 225.80 |
2019–20 season
| Date | Event | SP | FS | Total |
| 2–9 February 2020 | 2020 Bavarian Open | 1; 71.48 | 1; 130.75 | 1; 202.23 |
| 24–29 December 2019 | 2020 Russian Championships | 8; 67.73 | 3; 145.12 | 4; 212.85 |
| 4–8 December 2019 | 2019–20 Grand Prix Final | 4; 71.48 | 3; 131.65 | 3; 203.13 |
| 22–24 November 2019 | 2019 NHK Trophy | 3; 69.00 | 3; 134.35 | 3; 203.35 |
| 1–3 November 2019 | 2019 Internationaux de France | 2; 73.77 | 1; 133.81 | 1; 207.58 |
| 11–13 October 2019 | 2019 CS Finlandia Trophy | 1; 74.99 | 1; 135.19 | 1; 210.18 |

Junior results

2018–19 season
| Date | Event | Level | SP | FS | Total |
| 4–10 March 2019 | 2019 World Junior Championships | Junior | 3; 67.02 | 1; 121.72 | 1; 188.74 |
| 1–4 February 2019 | 2019 Russian Junior Championships | Junior | 1; 72.44 | 2; 127.04 | 1; 199.48 |
| 19–23 December 2018 | 2019 Russian Championships | Senior | 4; 72.85 | 5; 131.98 | 5; 204.83 |
| 6–9 December 2018 | 2018–19 JGP Final | Junior | 3; 64.37 | 1; 126.26 | 1; 190.63 |
| 11–18 November 2018 | 2018 CS Alpen Trophy | Senior | 1; 64.38 | 1; 128.37 | 1; 192.75 |
| 12–15 September 2018 | 2018 JGP Canada | Junior | 1; 65.22 | 1; 122.49 | 1; 187.71 |
| 22–25 August 2018 | 2018 JGP Slovakia | Junior | 1; 64.38 | 1; 120.42 | 1; 184.80 |
2017–18 season
| Date | Event | Level | SP | FS | Total |
| 5–11 March 2018 | 2018 World Junior Championships | Junior | 4; 56.95 | 2; 110.29 | 3; 167.24 |
| 23–26 January 2018 | 2018 Russian Junior Championships | Junior | 4; 61.93 | 3; 114.97 | 2; 176.90 |
| 21–24 December 2017 | 2018 Russian Championships | Senior | 7; 63.85 | 7; 121.98 | 7; 185.83 |
| 6–9 December 2017 | 2017 Golden Spin of Zagreb | Junior | 1; 59.06 | 1; 104.23 | 1; 163.29 |
