= 2022 European Figure Skating Championships =

Figure skating competition

- Type: ISU Championship
- Date: 10 – 16 January
- Season: 2021–22
- Location: Tallinn, Estonia
- Host: Estonian Skating Union
- Venue: Tondiraba Ice Hall

Champions
- Men's singles: (Russia) Mark Kondratiuk
- Women's singles: (Russia) Anna Shcherbakova
- Pairs: (Russia) Anastasia Mishina and Aleksandr Galliamov
- Ice dance: (Russia) Viktoria Sinitsina and Nikita Katsalapov
- Previous: 2020 European Championships
- Next: 2023 European Championships

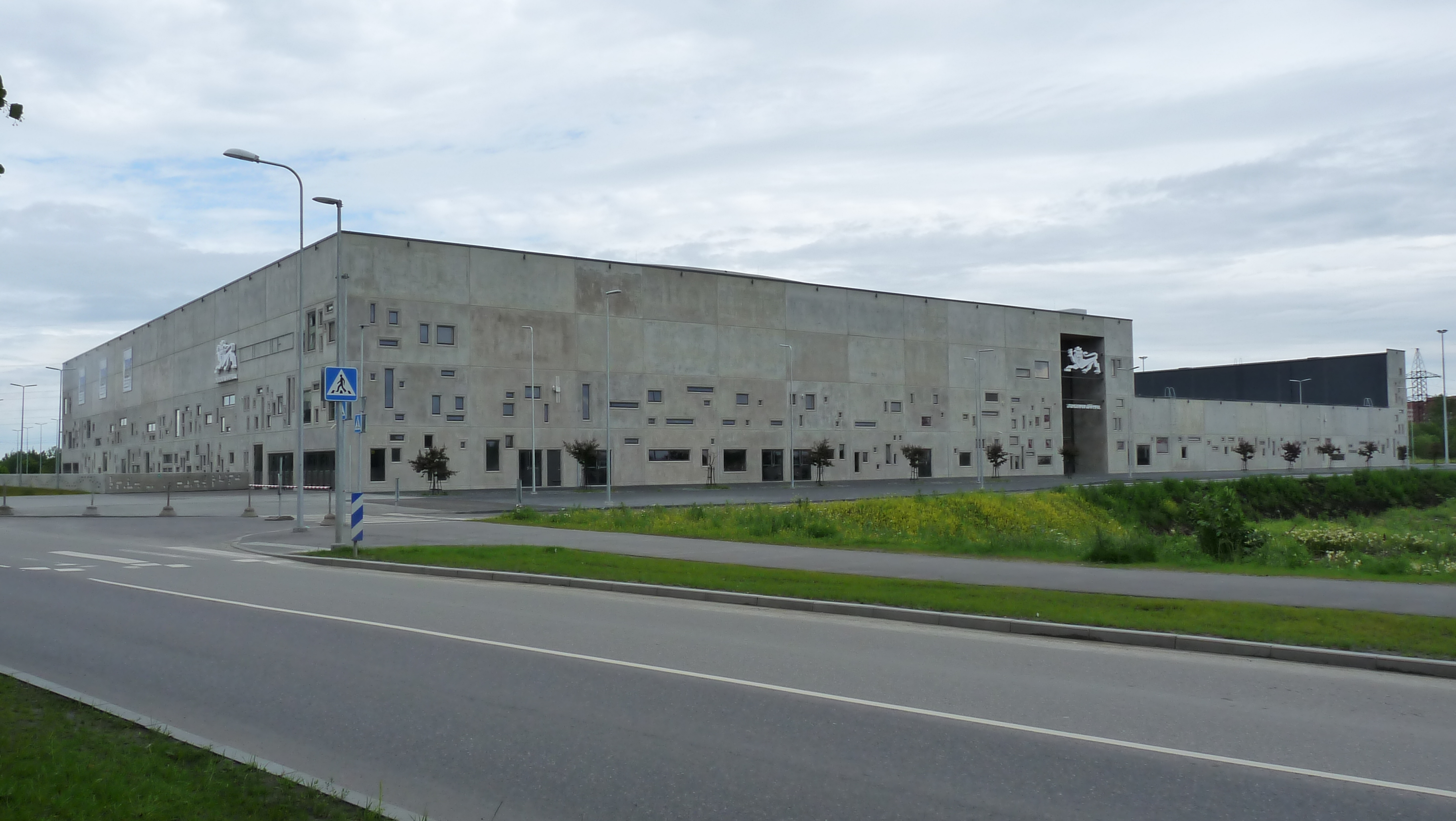
The 2022 European Figure Skating Championships were held at the Tondiraba Ice Hall in Tallinn, Estonia.

The 2022 European Figure Skating Championships were held from 10 to 16 January 2022 at the Tondiraba Ice Hall in Tallinn, Estonia. Medals were awarded in men's singles, women's singles, pair skating, and ice dance. The competition also determined the entry quotas for each skating federation to the 2023 European Championships. All of the winners were from Russia: Mark Kondratiuk won the men's event, Anastasia Mishina and Aleksandr Galliamov won the pairs' event, and Victoria Sinitsina and Nikita Katsalapov won the ice dance event. Although Kamila Valieva of Russia had originally finished first in the women's event and was awarded the gold medal, her scores were later voided by the Court of Arbitration for Sport and Anna Shcherbakova, who had originally won the silver medal, was elevated to gold medalist.

== Background ==
The European Figure Skating Championships are an annual figure skating competition sanctioned by the International Skating Union (ISU). They are the oldest competition in figure skating. The first European Championships were held in 1891 in Hamburg, Germany. Only eligible skaters from ISU member countries in Europe are allowed to compete, while skaters from countries outside of Europe instead compete at the Four Continents Figure Skating Championships. The 2022 European Championships were held from 10 to 16 January 2022 at the Tondiraba Ice Hall in Tallinn, Estonia. Tallinn had been announced as the host in June 2019.

== Qualification ==
Normally, the number of entries from each nation for the 2022 European Championships would have been based on the results of the preceding European Championships. However, as the 2021 European Championships had been cancelled due to the COVID-19 pandemic, the results of the 2020 European Championships were used instead. These nations were eligible to enter more than one skater or team in the indicated disciplines.

Number of entries per discipline
| Spots | Men | Women | Pairs | Ice dance |
|---|---|---|---|---|
| 3 | Italy; Russia | Russia | Germany; Italy; Russia | Russia |
| 2 | Azerbaijan; Czech Republic; Georgia; Germany; Israel; Latvia | Azerbaijan; Estonia; Finland; France; Italy; Poland; Switzerland | Austria; France; Hungary | France; Great Britain; Italy; Poland; Spain; Ukraine |

== Schedule ==
All times are listed in local time (UTC+02:00).

| Date | Discipline | Time | Segment |
|---|---|---|---|
| 12 January | Men | 11:25 | Short program |
| 12 January | Pairs | 18:45 | Short program |
| 13 January | Women | 11:05 | Short program |
| 13 January | Pairs | 19:00 | Free skating |
| 14 January | Ice dance | 12:00 | Rhythm dance |
| 14 January | Men | 18:00 | Free skating |
| 15 January | Ice dance | 13:25 | Free dance |
| 15 January | Women | 18:30 | Free skating |
| 16 January | —N/a | 15:30 | Exhibition gala |

== Changes to preliminary assignments ==
The International Skating Union published a complete list of entries on 21 December 2021.

| Date | Discipline | Withdrew | Added | Notes | Ref. |
|---|---|---|---|---|---|
| 6 January | Ice dance | (France); Gabriella Papadakis; Guillaume Cizeron | (France); Loïcia Demougeot; Théo le Mercier | COVID-19 precautionary measure | |
| 7 January | Men | (Republic of Ireland); Samuel McAllister | (Republic of Ireland); Conor Stakelum | Positive COVID-19 test | |
| 7 January | Women | (Ukraine); Anastasiia Shabotova | (Ukraine); Mariia Andriichuk | Health problems | |
| 7 January | Pairs | (Italy); Nicole Della Monica; Matteo Guarise | —N/a | Precautionary measure | |
| 9 January | Men | (Israel); Alexei Bychenko | —N/a | Positive COVID-19 test on the Israeli team | |
| 9 January | Men | (Israel); Mark Gorodnitsky | —N/a | Positive COVID-19 test (coach) | |
| 9 January | Men | (Italy); Matteo Rizzo | (Italy); Nikolaj Memola | Technical reasons | |
| 9 January | Men | (Russia); Mikhail Kolyada | (Russia); Andrei Mozalev | Injury | |
| 9 January | Women | (Finland) Emmi Peltonen | (Finland) Oona Ounasvuori | Injury | |
| 9 January | Women | (Romania) Julia Sauter | —N/a | Positive COVID-19 test | |
| 9 January | Pairs | (Georgia (country)) Anastasiia Metelkina / Daniil Parkman | (Georgia (country)) Karina Safina / Luka Berulava | | |
| 9 January | Pairs | (United Kingdom) Zoe Jones / Christopher Boyadji | (United Kingdom) Anastasia Vaipan-Law / Luke Digby | Positive COVID-19 test (Jones) | |
| 9 January | Pairs | (Israel) Hailey Kops / Evgeni Krasnopolski | —N/a | Positive COVID-19 test on the Israeli team | |
| 9 January | Pairs | (Switzerland) Jessica Pfund / Joshua Santillan | —N/a | Positive COVID-19 test (Santillan) | |
| 9 January | Ice dance | (Israel) Mariia Nosovitskaya / Mikhail Nosovitskiy | —N/a | Positive COVID-19 test on the Israeli team | |
| 10 January | Women | (Slovakia) Ema Doboszová | (Slovakia) Alexandra Michaela Filcová | Positive COVID-19 test (coach) | |
| 10 January | Ice dance | (Georgia (country)) Maria Kazakova / Georgy Reviya | —N/a | | |
| 11 January | Pairs | (Austria) Miriam Ziegler / Severin Kiefer | —N/a | Injury (Kiefer) | |
| 12 January | Women | (Ukraine) Mariia Andriichuk | —N/a | Positive COVID-19 test | |
| 13 January | Ice dance | (Bosnia and Herzegovina) Ekaterina Mitrofanova / Vladislav Kasinskij | —N/a | | |
| 13 January | Ice dance | (Finland) Juulia Turkkila / Matthias Versluis | —N/a | Positive COVID-19 test (Turkkila) | |

== Judging ==
For the 2021–2022 season, all of the technical elements in any figure skating performance – such as jumps, spins, and lifts – were assigned a predetermined base point value and were then scored by a panel of nine judges on a scale from −5 to 5 based on their quality of execution. The judging panel's Grade of Execution (GOE) was determined by calculating the trimmed mean (that is, an average after deleting the highest and lowest scores), and this GOE was added to the base value to come up with the final score for each element. The panel's scores for all elements were added together to generate a total element score. At the same time, judges evaluated each performance based on five program components – skating skills, transitions, performance, composition, and interpretation of the music – and assigned a score from .25 to 10 in .25 point increments. The judging panel's final score for each program component was also determined by calculating the trimmed mean. Those scores were then multiplied by the factor shown on the following chart; the results were added together to generate a total program component score.

Program component factoring
| Discipline | Short program or Rhythm dance | Free skate or Free dance |
|---|---|---|
| Men | 1.00 | 2.00 |
| Women | 0.80 | 1.60 |
| Pairs | 0.80 | 1.60 |
| Ice dance | 0.80 | 1.20 |

Deductions were applied for certain violations like time infractions, stops and restarts, or falls. The total element score and total program component score were added together, minus any deductions, to generate a final performance score for each skater or team.

== Medal summary ==
=== Medalists ===
Medals awarded to the skaters who achieved the highest overall placements in each discipline:

Medal recipients
| Discipline | Gold | Silver | Bronze |
|---|---|---|---|
| Men | (Russia) Mark Kondratiuk | (Italy) Daniel Grassl | (Latvia) Deniss Vasiļjevs |
| Women | (Russia) Anna Shcherbakova | (Russia) Alexandra Trusova | (Belgium) Loena Hendrickx |
| Pairs | (Russia); Anastasia Mishina; Aleksandr Galliamov | (Russia); Evgenia Tarasova; Vladimir Morozov | (Russia); Aleksandra Boikova; Dmitrii Kozlovskii |
| Ice dance | (Russia); Victoria Sinitsina; Nikita Katsalapov | (Russia); Alexandra Stepanova; Ivan Bukin | (Italy); Charlène Guignard; Marco Fabbri |

Small medals awarded to the skaters who achieved the highest short program or rhythm dance placements in each discipline:

Small medal recipients for highest short program or rhythm dance
| Discipline | Gold | Silver | Bronze |
|---|---|---|---|
| Men | (Russia) Andrei Mozalev | (Russia) Mark Kondratiuk | (Russia) Evgeni Semenenko |
| Women | (Belgium) Loena Hendrickx | (Russia) Alexandra Trusova | (Russia) Anna Shcherbakova |
| Pairs | (Russia); Anastasia Mishina; Aleksandr Galliamov | (Russia); Evgenia Tarasova; Vladimir Morozov | (Russia); Aleksandra Boikova; Dmitrii Kozlovskii |
| Ice dance | (Russia); Victoria Sinitsina; Nikita Katsalapov | (Russia); Alexandra Stepanova; Ivan Bukin | (Italy); Charlène Guignard; Marco Fabbri |

Small medals awarded to the skaters who achieved the highest free skating or free dance placements in each discipline:

Small medal recipients for highest free skate or free dance
| Discipline | Gold | Silver | Bronze |
|---|---|---|---|
| Men | (Russia) Mark Kondratiuk | (Italy) Daniel Grassl | (Latvia) Deniss Vasiļjevs |
| Women | (Russia) Anna Shcherbakova | (Russia) Alexandra Trusova | (Poland) Ekaterina Kurakova |
| Pairs | (Russia); Anastasia Mishina; Aleksandr Galliamov | (Russia); Evgenia Tarasova; Vladimir Morozov | (Russia); Aleksandra Boikova; Dmitrii Kozlovskii |
| Ice dance | (Russia); Victoria Sinitsina; Nikita Katsalapov | (Russia); Alexandra Stepanova; Ivan Bukin | (Italy); Charlène Guignard; Marco Fabbri |

=== Medals by country ===
Table of medals for overall placement:

| Rank | Nation | Gold | Silver | Bronze | Total |
|---|---|---|---|---|---|
| 1 | Russia | 4 | 3 | 1 | 8 |
| 2 | Italy | 0 | 1 | 1 | 2 |
| 3 | Belgium | 0 | 0 | 1 | 1 |
| 3 | Latvia | 0 | 0 | 1 | 1 |
| Totals (4 entries) | | 4 | 4 | 4 | 12 |

== Records ==
The following new ISU best scores were set during this event:

| Disc. | Segment | Skater(s) | Score | Date | Ref. |
|---|---|---|---|---|---|
| Pairs | Short program | (Russia) Anastasia Mishina / Aleksandr Galliamov | 82.36 | 12 January 2022 | |
| Pairs | Free skating | (Russia) Anastasia Mishina / Aleksandr Galliamov | 157.46 | 13 January 2022 | |
| Pairs | Total score | (Russia) Anastasia Mishina / Aleksandr Galliamov | 239.82 | 13 January 2022 | |

== Results ==
=== Men's singles ===
Sweden's Nikolaj Majorov withdrew prior to the short program after testing positive for COVID-19.

Men's results
| Rank | Name | Nation | Total points | SP | | FS | |
|---|---|---|---|---|---|---|---|
| 1st place, gold medalist(s) | Mark Kondratiuk | Russia | 286.56 | 2 | 99.06 | 1 | 187.50 |
| 2nd place, silver medalist(s) | Daniel Grassl | Italy | 274.48 | 5 | 91.75 | 2 | 182.73 |
| 3rd place, bronze medalist(s) | Deniss Vasiļjevs | Latvia | 272.08 | 6 | 90.24 | 3 | 181.84 |
| 4 | Andrei Mozalev | Russia | 265.69 | 1 | 99.76 | 6 | 165.93 |
| 5 | Evgeni Semenenko | Russia | 260.00 | 3 | 99.04 | 9 | 160.96 |
| 6 | Morisi Kvitelashvili | Georgia | 253.91 | 4 | 92.76 | 8 | 161.15 |
| 7 | Kévin Aymoz | France | 252.21 | 10 | 80.39 | 4 | 171.82 |
| 8 | Vladimir Litvintsev | Azerbaijan | 244.70 | 7 | 83.46 | 7 | 161.24 |
| 9 | Gabriele Frangipani | Italy | 238.95 | 9 | 81.79 | 10 | 157.16 |
| 10 | Michal Březina | Czech Republic | 238.38 | 15 | 71.60 | 5 | 166.78 |
| 11 | Lukas Britschgi | Switzerland | 218.91 | 13 | 72.96 | 11 | 145.95 |
| 12 | Ivan Shmuratko | Ukraine | 214.57 | 8 | 82.13 | 15 | 132.44 |
| 13 | Nikita Starostin | Germany | 214.40 | 14 | 72.12 | 12 | 142.28 |
| 14 | Arlet Levandi | Estonia | 208.52 | 17 | 70.04 | 13 | 138.48 |
| 15 | Nikolaj Memola | Italy | 206.53 | 12 | 73.98 | 14 | 132.55 |
| 16 | Paul Fentz | Germany | 206.06 | 11 | 76.76 | 16 | 129.30 |
| 17 | Maurizio Zandron | Austria | 193.91 | 16 | 70.75 | 20 | 123.16 |
| 18 | Kornel Witkowski | Poland | 193.29 | 23 | 66.26 | 17 | 127.03 |
| 19 | Valtter Virtanen | Finland | 190.97 | 20 | 67.34 | 18 | 123.63 |
| 20 | Davide Lewton Brain | Monaco | 190.67 | 21 | 67.31 | 19 | 123.36 |
| 21 | Konstantin Milyukov | Belarus | 182.59 | 18 | 69.10 | 21 | 113.49 |
| 22 | Tomàs-Llorenç Guarino Sabaté | Spain | 178.67 | 24 | 66.20 | 22 | 112.47 |
| 23 | Burak Demirboğa | Turkey | 168.03 | 22 | 67.30 | 23 | 100.73 |
| 24 | Slavik Hayrapetyan | Armenia | 167.84 | 19 | 67.75 | 24 | 100.09 |
| 25 | Adam Hagara | Slovakia | 65.23 | 25 | 65.23 | Did not advance to free skate | |
| 26 | Graham Newberry | Great Britain | 64.49 | 26 | 64.49 | Did not advance to free skate | |
| 27 | Matyáš Bělohradský | Czech Republic | 64.38 | 27 | 64.38 | Did not advance to free skate | |
| 28 | Nika Egadze | Georgia | 63.60 | 28 | 63.60 | Did not advance to free skate | |
| 29 | Daniels Kockers | Latvia | 56.10 | 29 | 56.10 | Did not advance to free skate | |
| 30 | Conor Stakelum | Ireland | 56.00 | 30 | 56.00 | Did not advance to free skate | |
| 31 | Jari Kessler | Croatia | 55.82 | 31 | 55.82 | Did not advance to free skate | |
| 32 | András Csernoch | Hungary | 54.88 | 32 | 54.88 | Did not advance to free skate | |
| 33 | Larry Loupolover | Bulgaria | 45.67 | 33 | 45.67 | Did not advance to free skate | |
| WD | Nikolaj Majorov | Sweden | Withdrew from competition | | | | |

=== Women's singles ===
On 29 January 2024, the Court of Arbitration for Sport disqualified Kamila Valieva of Russia for four years retroactive to 25 December 2021 for an anti-doping violation. Thus, her scores from the 2022 European Championships were annulled. As a result, Anna Shcherbakova of Russia was elevated to gold medalist, Alexandra Trusova of Russia to silver, and Loena Hendrickx of Belgium to bronze, breaking what had otherwise been an all-Russian sweep of the women's podium that year.

Women's results
| Rank | Name | Nation | Total points | SP | | FS | |
|---|---|---|---|---|---|---|---|
| 1st place, gold medalist(s) | Anna Shcherbakova | Russia | 237.42 | 3 | 69.05 | 1 | 168.37 |
| 2nd place, silver medalist(s) | Alexandra Trusova | Russia | 234.36 | 2 | 75.13 | 2 | 159.23 |
| 3rd place, bronze medalist(s) | Loena Hendrickx | Belgium | 207.97 | 1 | 76.25 | 4 | 131.72 |
| 4 | Ekaterina Kurakova | Poland | 204.73 | 4 | 67.47 | 3 | 137.26 |
| 5 | Ekaterina Ryabova | Azerbaijan | 196.75 | 6 | 65.47 | 5 | 131.28 |
| 6 | Anastasiia Gubanova | Georgia | 188.17 | 5 | 67.02 | 8 | 121.15 |
| 7 | Niina Petrõkina | Estonia | 187.07 | 16 | 58.30 | 6 | 128.77 |
| 8 | Viktoriia Safonova | Belarus | 185.41 | 7 | 63.07 | 7 | 122.34 |
| 9 | Alexia Paganini | Switzerland | 178.10 | 8 | 62.32 | 9 | 115.78 |
| 10 | Eva-Lotta Kiibus | Estonia | 171.64 | 14 | 59.16 | 10 | 112.48 |
| 11 | Léa Serna | France | 171.00 | 9 | 62.16 | 12 | 108.84 |
| 12 | Nicole Schott | Germany | 170.18 | 10 | 61.86 | 13 | 108.32 |
| 13 | Josefin Taljegård | Sweden | 164.30 | 17 | 58.24 | 14 | 106.06 |
| 14 | Olga Mikutina | Austria | 164.01 | 11 | 60.16 | 16 | 103.85 |
| 15 | Lara Naki Gutmann | Italy | 163.99 | 22 | 52.94 | 11 | 111.05 |
| 16 | Natasha McKay | Great Britain | 161.74 | 18 | 57.07 | 15 | 104.67 |
| 17 | Jenni Saarinen | Finland | 160.32 | 15 | 58.93 | 18 | 101.39 |
| 18 | Yasmine Kimiko Yamada | Switzerland | 159.18 | 20 | 56.54 | 17 | 102.64 |
| 19 | Alexandra Feigin | Bulgaria | 155.56 | 19 | 56.78 | 19 | 98.78 |
| 20 | Eliška Březinová | Czech Republic | 155.24 | 12 | 59.62 | 20 | 95.62 |
| 21 | Aleksandra Golovkina | Lithuania | 142.20 | 23 | 52.63 | 21 | 89.57 |
| 22 | Regina Schermann | Hungary | 133.42 | 21 | 54.43 | 22 | 78.99 |
| WD | Marina Piredda | Italy | Withdrew | 13 | 59.53 | Withdrew from competition | |
| 24 | Anete Lāce | Latvia | 49.75 | 24 | 49.75 | Did not advance to free skate | |
| 25 | Oona Ounasvuori | Finland | 49.13 | 25 | 49.13 | Did not advance to free skate | |
| 26 | Lindsay van Zundert | Netherlands | 48.92 | 26 | 48.92 | Did not advance to free skate | |
| 27 | Daša Grm | Slovenia | 47.85 | 27 | 47.85 | Did not advance to free skate | |
| 28 | Antonina Dubinina | Serbia | 47.77 | 28 | 47.77 | Did not advance to free skate | |
| 29 | Taylor Morris | Israel | 46.60 | 29 | 46.60 | Did not advance to free skate | |
| 30 | Linnea Kilsand | Norway | 45.51 | 30 | 45.31 | Did not advance to free skate | |
| 31 | Marilena Kitromilis | Cyprus | 44.03 | 31 | 44.03 | Did not advance to free skate | |
| 32 | Alexandra Michaela Filcová | Slovakia | 43.56 | 32 | 43.56 | Did not advance to free skate | |
| 33 | Aldís Kara Bergsdóttir | Iceland | 42.23 | 33 | 42.23 | Did not advance to free skate | |
| 34 | Sinem Pekder | Turkey | 42.16 | 34 | 42.16 | Did not advance to free skate | |
| 35 | Maia Sørensen | Denmark | 40.93 | 35 | 40.93 | Did not advance to free skate | |
| DSQ | Kamila Valieva | Russia | ~~259.06~~ | ~~1~~ | ~~90.45~~ | ~~1~~ | ~~168.61~~ |

=== Pairs ===
Pairs' results
| Rank | Team | Nation | Total points | SP | | FS | |
|---|---|---|---|---|---|---|---|
| 1st place, gold medalist(s) | Anastasia Mishina; Aleksandr Galliamov | Russia | 239.82 | 1 | 82.36 | 1 | 157.46 |
| 2nd place, silver medalist(s) | Evgenia Tarasova; Vladimir Morozov | Russia | 236.43 | 2 | 81.58 | 2 | 154.85 |
| 3rd place, bronze medalist(s) | Aleksandra Boikova; Dmitrii Kozlovskii | Russia | 227.23 | 3 | 76.26 | 3 | 150.97 |
| 4 | Karina Safina / Luka Berulava | Georgia | 184.05 | 6 | 61.93 | 4 | 122.12 |
| 5 | Rebecca Ghilardi / Filippo Ambrosini | Italy | 178.90 | 4 | 62.76 | 5 | 116.14 |
| 6 | Ioulia Chtchetinina / Márk Magyar | Hungary | 171.03 | 7 | 60.96 | 7 | 110.07 |
| 7 | Sara Conti / Niccolò Macii | Italy | 168.90 | 10 | 56.28 | 6 | 112.62 |
| 8 | Minerva Fabienne Hase / Nolan Seegert | Germany | 168.75 | 5 | 62.21 | 9 | 106.54 |
| 9 | Laura Barquero / Marco Zandron | Spain | 168.40 | 8 | 60.65 | 8 | 107.75 |
| 10 | Bogdana Lukashevich / Alexander Stepanov | Belarus | 161.76 | 9 | 58.80 | 12 | 102.96 |
| 11 | Maria Pavlova / Balázs Nagy | Hungary | 161.32 | 11 | 56.24 | 11 | 105.08 |
| 12 | Jelizaveta Žuková / Martin Bidař | Czech Republic | 159.73 | 15 | 54.40 | 10 | 105.33 |
| 13 | Annika Hocke / Robert Kunkel | Germany | 156.91 | 13 | 55.17 | 13 | 101.74 |
| 14 | Camille Kovalev / Pavel Kovalev | France | 156.55 | 12 | 56.04 | 14 | 100.51 |
| 15 | Sofiia Holichenko / Artem Darenskyi | Ukraine | 147.61 | 14 | 55.15 | 15 | 92.46 |
| 16 | Lana Petranović / Antonio Souza-Kordeiru | Croatia | 143.24 | 16 | 52.78 | 16 | 90.56 |
| 17 | Coline Keriven / Noël-Antoine Pierre | France | 51.79 | 17 | 51.79 | Did not advance to free skate | |
| 18 | Anastasia Vaipan-Law / Luke Digby | Great Britain | 51.11 | 18 | 51.11 | Did not advance to free skate | |
| 19 | Letizia Roscher / Luis Schuster | Germany | 48.77 | 19 | 48.77 | Did not advance to free skate | |
| 20 | Milania Väänänen / Mikhail Akulov | Finland | 46.34 | 20 | 46.34 | Did not advance to free skate | |
| 21 | Daria Danilova / Michel Tsiba | Netherlands | 36.86 | 21 | 36.86 | Did not advance to free skate | |

=== Ice dance ===
Poland's Anastasia Polibina and Pavel Golovishnikov withdrew prior to the rhythm dance after testing positive for COVID-19.

| Rank | Team | Nation | Total points | RD | | FD | |
|---|---|---|---|---|---|---|---|
| 1st place, gold medalist(s) | Victoria Sinitsina / Nikita Katsalapov | Russia | 217.96 | 1 | 87.89 | 1 | 130.07 |
| 2nd place, silver medalist(s) | Alexandra Stepanova / Ivan Bukin | Russia | 213.20 | 2 | 86.45 | 2 | 126.75 |
| 3rd place, bronze medalist(s) | Charlène Guignard / Marco Fabbri | Italy | 207.97 | 3 | 83.35 | 3 | 124.62 |
| 4 | Olivia Smart / Adrián Díaz | Spain | 196.86 | 5 | 77.99 | 4 | 118.87 |
| 5 | Lilah Fear / Lewis Gibson | Great Britain | 196.01 | 4 | 79.97 | 6 | 116.04 |
| 6 | Sara Hurtado / Kirill Khaliavin | Spain | 191.90 | 6 | 75.83 | 5 | 116.07 |
| 7 | Diana Davis / Gleb Smolkin | Russia | 186.61 | 8 | 73.32 | 7 | 113.29 |
| 8 | Allison Reed / Saulius Ambrulevičius | Lithuania | 183.17 | 7 | 74.45 | 8 | 108.72 |
| 9 | Evgeniia Lopareva / Geoffrey Brissaud | France | 178.34 | 10 | 70.22 | 9 | 108.12 |
| 10 | Oleksandra Nazarova / Maksym Nikitin | Ukraine | 173.99 | 12 | 68.51 | 10 | 105.48 |
| 11 | Natálie Taschlerová / Filip Taschler | Czech Republic | 172.39 | 11 | 69.72 | 13 | 102.67 |
| 12 | Katharina Müller / Tim Dieck | Germany | 170.27 | 13 | 67.46 | 12 | 102.81 |
| 13 | Tina Garabedian / Simon Proulx-Sénécal | Armenia | 168.43 | 14 | 65.58 | 11 | 102.85 |
| 14 | Natalia Kaliszek / Maksym Spodyriev | Poland | 166.52 | 9 | 70.47 | 16 | 96.05 |
| 15 | Sasha Fear / George Waddell | Great Britain | 163.21 | 16 | 63.61 | 14 | 99.60 |
| 16 | Loïcia Demougeot / Théo le Mercier | France | 162.77 | 15 | 64.55 | 15 | 98.22 |
| 17 | Mariia Holubtsova / Kyryl Bielobrov | Ukraine | 156.35 | 17 | 63.30 | 17 | 93.05 |
| 18 | Mariia Ignateva / Danijil Szemko | Hungary | 150.83 | 19 | 60.41 | 18 | 90.42 |
| 19 | Jasmine Tessari / Stéphane Walker | Switzerland | 147.55 | 18 | 60.98 | 19 | 86.57 |
| 20 | Solène Mazingue / Marko Jevgeni Gaidajenko | Estonia | 142.89 | 20 | 60.36 | 20 | 83.53 |
| 21 | Carolina Moscheni / Francesco Fioretti | Italy | 59.13 | 21 | 59.13 | —N/a | |
| 22 | Viktoria Semenjuk / Ilya Yukhimuk | Belarus | 54.28 | 22 | 54.28 | —N/a | |
| 23 | Mária Sofia Pucherová / Nikita Lysak | Slovakia | 54.19 | 23 | 54.19 | —N/a | |
| 24 | Aurelija Ipolito / Luke Russell | Latvia | 53.35 | 24 | 53.35 | —N/a | |
| 25 | Hanna Jakucs / Alessio Galli | Netherlands | 49.39 | 25 | 49.39 | —N/a | |
| 26 | Ekaterina Kuznetsova / Oleksandr Kolosovskyi | Azerbaijan | 48.35 | 26 | 48.35 | —N/a | |
| WD | Anastasia Polibina / Pavel Golovishnikov | Poland | Withdrew from competition | | | | |

== Works cited ==
- "Special Regulations & Technical Rules – Single & Pair Skating and Ice Dance 2021". International Skating Union. Archived from the original on 4 April 2022.
