= Nikolai Velikov =

Russian pair skating coach (born 1945)

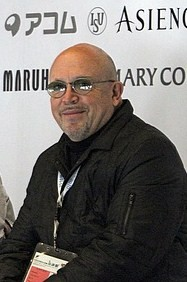
- Nikolai Velikov in December 2010

Personal information
- Full name: Nikolai Matveyevich Velikov
- Born: 6 June 1945 (age 81) Nerekhta, Soviet Union

Figure skating career
- Partner: Ludmila Sinitsina (Velikova)

Nikolai Matveyevich Velikov (Russian: Николай Матвеевич Великов; born 6 June 1945 in Nerekhta) is a Russian pair skating coach.

Velikov competed with his wife Ludmila Sinitsina, placing fifth at the Soviet Championships. Velikov later retired from competitive skating and became the coach of his wife with Anatoly Yevdokimov, a team who won bronze medals at the 1972 USSR Cup and 1973 RSFSR.

Velikov and his wife, now known as Ludmila Velikova, are based in Saint Petersburg, Russia.

Their current students include:

- Anastasia Mishina / Aleksandr Galiamov
- Polina Kostiukovich / Dmitrii Ialin
- Kseniia Akhanteva / Valerii Kolesov

Their former students include:

- Anastasia Mishina / Vladislav Mirzoev
- Evgenia Shishkova / Vadim Naumov
- Maria Petrova / Anton Sikharulidze
- Maria Petrova / Alexei Tikhonov
- Ekaterina Vasilieva / Alexander Smirnov
- Maria Mukhortova / Maxim Trankov
- Julia Obertas / Alexei Sokolov
- Julia Obertas / Sergei Slavnov
- Ksenia Stolbova / Fedor Klimov

== Awards ==
- Master of Sports of the USSR
- Honored Coach of Russia
