= 2021 ISU World Team Trophy in Figure Skating =

Figure skating competition

2021 World Team Trophy
- Type: ISU Event
- Date: April 15 – 18
- Season: 2020–21
- Location: Osaka, Japan
- Host: Japan Skating Federation
- Venue: Maruzen Intec Arena Osaka
- Previous: 2019 ISU World Team Trophy
- Next: 2023 ISU World Team Trophy

The 2021 ISU World Team Trophy is an international figure skating competition that was held from April 15–18, 2021 in Osaka, Japan. The top six International Skating Union members were invited to compete in a team format with points awarded based on skaters' placement. Participating countries selected two men's single skaters, two ladies' single skaters, one pair, and one ice dance entry for their team.

== Impact of the COVID-19 pandemic ==
Despite the majority of the season's ISU Championship-level events having been cancelled during the COVID-19 pandemic, the ISU decided to host the World Team Trophy, if possible. The Japan Skating Federation announced that limited tickets would be available to the public. Despite the COVID prevention measures implemented in the prefecture, the socially-distanced arena reportedly sold out. The opening day of competition took place with seating limited to alternate seats and masks required for all in attendance.

Osaka Prefecture governor Hirofumi Yoshimura announced on April 1, 2021 that he plans to make Osaka City a target area for "priority measures such as spread prevention" for one month from April 5. In line with the tightened restrictions, both Yoshimura and Osaka City Mayor Ichirō Matsui called for the cancellation of the 2020 Summer Olympics torch relay leg scheduled to begin in Osaka City on April 14, one day before the World Team Trophy. The eventual cancellation of the public torch relay leg, coupled with record-setting case numbers in Osaka, raised questions about whether the World Team Trophy should proceed as scheduled. In addition to the torch relay leg, an ITU Triathlon World Cup event scheduled to be held in Osaka in May was cancelled and sport officials for an Olympic test event could not enter Japan because of coronavirus restrictions. On April 7, Governor Yoshimura declared a medical state of emergency in the prefecture following record numbers of COVID cases in the region.

== Scoring ==
Skaters competed in both the short program/rhythm dance and the free skating/free dance segments for their team. Each segment was scored separately. The points earned per placement are as follows:

Placement	Points (Singles)	Points (Pairs/Dance)
1st	12	
2nd	11	
3rd	10	
4th	9	
5th	8	
6th	7	
7th	6	—N/a
8th	5	—N/a
9th	4	—N/a
10th	3	—N/a
11th	2	—N/a
12th	1	—N/a

Tie-breaking within a segment:

1. If two or more skaters, pairs, or ice dance couples have the same rank in a segment, then the total technical score will be used to break ties.

If these results do not break the tie, the competitors concerned will be considered tied. The team points will be awarded according to the placement of the skaters/couples in each discipline.

Tie-breaking within team standings:

1. The highest total team points from the two best places in different disciplines of the current phase will break the ties.
2. If they remain tied, the highest total segment scores of the two best places according to the team points in different disciplines of the current phase will break the ties.
3. If they remain tied, the highest total team points from the three best places in different disciplines of the current phase will break the ties.
4. If they remain tied, the highest total segment scores of the three best places according to the team points in different disciplines of the current phase will break the ties.

If these criteria fail to break the ties, the teams will be considered as tied.

== Entries ==
Names with an asterisk (*) denote the team captain.

Nations began announcing their entries shortly after the 2021 World Championships. The International Skating Union published a complete list of entries on March 31, 2021.

Country	Men	Ladies	Pairs	Ice dance
Canada	Nam Nguyen*; Roman Sadovsky	Gabrielle Daleman; Alison Schumacher	Lori-Ann Matte / Thierry Ferland	Carolane Soucisse / Shane Firus
France	Kévin Aymoz*; Adam Siao Him Fa	Maïa Mazzara; Léa Serna	Cléo Hamon / Denys Strekalin	Adelina Galyavieva / Louis Thauron
Italy	Daniel Grassl	Lara Naki Gutmann; Ginevra Lavinia Negrello	Nicole Della Monica / Matteo Guarise*	Charlène Guignard / Marco Fabbri
Japan	Yuzuru Hanyu; Shoma Uno	Rika Kihira; Kaori Sakamoto	Riku Miura / Ryuichi Kihara*	Misato Komatsubara / Tim Koleto
Russia	Mikhail Kolyada; Evgeni Semenenko	Anna Shcherbakova; Elizaveta Tuktamysheva*	Anastasia Mishina / Aleksandr Galliamov	Victoria Sinitsina / Nikita Katsalapov
United States	Jason Brown*; Nathan Chen	Karen Chen; Bradie Tennell	Alexa Knierim / Brandon Frazier	Kaitlin Hawayek / Jean-Luc Baker

=== Changes to preliminary entries ===
China was among the top six qualifying nations, but the Chinese Skating Association declined the invitation; China was replaced by France. Skate Canada opted not to send any of its World team members, as the mandatory two-week quarantine period upon returning to Canada left them with no time to train before needing to leave for Japan.

Date	Discipline	Withdrew	Added	Reason/Other notes	Refs
April 11, 2021	Men	(Italy) Matteo Rizzo	N/A (Italy's alternate, Gabriele Frangipani, was also unable to travel to Osaka.)	COVID-19	

== Results ==
=== Team standings ===
Rank	Nation	Men		Ladies		Pairs		Ice dance		Total team points
Rank	Nation	SP	FS	SP	FS	SP	FS	RD	FD	Total team points
1	Russia	8	10	12	12	12	12	12	12	125
1	Russia	6	8	11	10	12	12	12	12	125
2	United States	12	12	8	9	9	11	10	10	110
2	United States	10	5	7	7	9	11	10	10	110
3	Japan	11	11	10	11	10	10	8	8	107
3	Japan	4	7	9	8	10	10	8	8	107
4	Italy	3	6	6	6	11	9	11	11	72
4	Italy	–		5	4	11	9	11	11	72
5	France	9	9	2	2	8	8	9	9	67
5	France	5	4	1	1	8	8	9	9	67
6	Canada	7	3	4	5	7	7	7	7	57
6	Canada	2	2	3	3	7	7	7	7	57

=== Men ===
Rank	Name	Nation	Total points	SP		Team points	FS		Team points
1	Nathan Chen	United States	312.89	1	109.65	12	1	203.24	12
2	Yuzuru Hanyu	Japan	300.88	2	107.12	11	2	193.76	11
3	Mikhail Kolyada	Russia	274.14	5	93.42	8	3	180.72	10
4	Kévin Aymoz	France	263.82	4	94.69	9	4	169.13	9
5	Evgeni Semenenko	Russia	255.19	7	88.86	6	5	166.33	8
6	Jason Brown	United States	255.19	3	94.86	10	8	160.33	5
7	Shoma Uno	Japan	242.42	9	77.46	4	6	164.96	7
8	Adam Siao Him Fa	France	230.92	8	78.28	5	9	152.64	4
9	Daniel Grassl	Italy	228.88	10	67.32	3	7	161.56	6
10	Roman Sadovsky	Canada	224.41	6	89.61	7	10	134.80	3
11	Nam Nguyen	Canada	199.93	11	66.89	2	11	133.04	2

=== Ladies ===
Rank	Name	Nation	Total points	SP		Team points	FS		Team points
1	Anna Shcherbakova	Russia	241.65	1	81.07	12	1	160.58	12
2	Kaori Sakamoto	Japan	228.07	3	77.78	10	2	150.29	11
3	Elizaveta Tuktamysheva	Russia	226.58	2	80.35	11	3	146.23	10
4	Rika Kihira	Japan	202.13	4	69.74	9	5	132.39	8
5	Bradie Tennell	United States	200.59	5	67.40	8	4	133.19	9
6	Karen Chen	United States	189.72	6	62.48	7	6	127.24	7
7	Lara Naki Gutmann	Italy	179.59	7	60.45	6	7	119.14	6
8	Alison Schumacher	Canada	171.17	9	59.19	4	8	111.98	5
9	Ginevra Lavinia Negrello	Italy	170.20	8	59.55	5	9	110.65	4
10	Gabrielle Daleman	Canada	164.52	10	57.22	3	10	107.30	3
11	Maïa Mazzara	France	155.42	11	55.31	2	11	100.11	2
12	Léa Serna	France	152.91	12	55.28	1	12	97.63	1

=== Pairs ===
Rank	Name	Nation	Total points	SP		Team points	FS		Team points
1	Anastasia Mishina / Aleksandr Galliamov	Russia	225.36	1	73.77	12	1	151.59	12
2	Alexa Knierim / Brandon Frazier	United States	199.31	4	65.68	9	2	133.63	11
3	Riku Miura / Ryuichi Kihara	Japan	196.65	3	65.82	10	3	130.83	10
4	Nicole Della Monica / Matteo Guarise	Italy	194.33	2	66.09	11	4	128.24	9
5	Cléo Hamon / Denys Strekalin	France	166.18	5	61.37	8	5	104.81	8
6	Lori-Ann Matte / Thierry Ferland	Canada	156.74	6	54.91	7	6	101.83	7

=== Ice dance ===
Rank	Name	Nation	Total points	RD		Team points	FD		Team points
1	Victoria Sinitsina / Nikita Katsalapov	Russia	216.81	1	86.66	12	1	130.15	12
2	Charlène Guignard / Marco Fabbri	Italy	207.68	2	82.93	11	2	124.75	11
3	Kaitlin Hawayek / Jean-Luc Baker	United States	186.95	3	76.79	10	3	110.16	10
4	Adelina Galyavieva / Louis Thauron	France	176.92	4	70.34	9	4	106.58	9
5	Misato Komatsubara / Tim Koleto	Japan	167.24	5	66.42	8	5	100.82	8
6	Carolane Soucisse / Shane Firus	Canada	162.92	6	65.06	7	6	97.86	7

== Medalists ==
Discipline	Gold	Silver	Bronze
Team	Russia; Mikhail Kolyada; Evgeni Semenenko; Anna Shcherbakova; Elizaveta Tuktamysheva; Anastasia Mishina / Aleksandr Galliamov; Victoria Sinitsina / Nikita Katsalapov	United States; Jason Brown; Nathan Chen; Karen Chen; Bradie Tennell; Alexa Knierim / Brandon Frazier; Kaitlin Hawayek / Jean-Luc Baker	Japan; Yuzuru Hanyu; Shoma Uno; Rika Kihira; Kaori Sakamoto; Riku Miura / Ryuichi Kihara; Misato Komatsubara / Tim Koleto
