= Ludmila Velikova =

Russian figure skater and coach

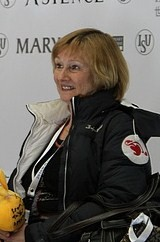
- Ludmila Velikova in December 2010

Personal information
- Full name: Ludmila Georgiyevna Velikova
- Other names: Ludmila Georgiyevna Sinitsina
- Born: November 4, 1947 (age 78) Leningrad, Soviet Union

Figure skating career
- Partner: Nikolai Velikov; Anatoly Yevdokimov

Ludmila Georgiyevna Velikova (Russian: Людмила Георгиевна Великова; née Sinitsina, Russian: Синицина; born November 4, 1947, in Leningrad) is a Russian pair skating coach and former competitor.

Ludmila Sinitsina, now known as Velikova, competed with her husband Nikolai Velikov, placing fifth at the Soviet Championships. Velikov later retired from competitive skating and became the coach of his wife with Anatoly Yevdokimov, a team who won bronze medals at the 1972 USSR Cup and 1973 RSFSR.

After the end of her career, Velikova also turned to coaching pairs alongside her husband. Based in Saint Petersburg, Russia.

Their current students include:

- Kseniia Akhanteva / Valerii Kolesov

Their former students include:

- Anastasia Mishina / Aleksandr Galiamov
- Anastasia Mishina / Vladislav Mirzoev
- Polina Kostiukovich / Dmitrii Ialin
- Ksenia Stolbova / Fedor Klimov
- Maria Petrova and Alexei Tikhonov
- Maria Mukhortova / Maxim Trankov
- Evgenia Shishkova / Vadim Naumov
- Maria Petrova / Anton Sikharulidze
- Ekaterina Vasilieva / Alexander Smirnov
- Julia Obertas / Alexei Sokolov
- Julia Obertas / Sergei Slavnov

== Awards ==
- Master of Sports of the USSR
- Honored Coach of Russia
