= Story of an Unknown Actor =

1976 film by Aleksandr Zarkhi

- Directed by: Aleksandr Zarkhi
- Written by: Aleksandr Zarkhi; Vladimir Valutsky
- Starring: Yevgeny Yevstigneyev; Alla Demidova
- Cinematography: Pyotr Shumsky
- Music by: Alfred Schnittke
- Production company: Mosfilm
- Release date: 3 October 1977 (Soviet Union)
- Running time: 83 minutes
- Country: Soviet Union
- Language: Russian

Story of an Unknown Actor (Russian: Повесть о неизвестном актёре, romanized: Povest o neizvestnom aktyore) is a Soviet drama film directed by Aleksandr Zarkhi in 1977.

== Plot ==
Pavel Pavlovich Goryaev, middle-aged actor. For many years, he played in the provincial theater on lead roles. The director of the piece based on the play, written for Goryaev, takes a young actor for his role. Goryaev first falls into despair, leaves the theater, makes an appeal to his friends. After a while, he digests what happened and realizes it's time to leave the scene adequately.

== Cast ==
- Yevgeny Yevstigneyev as Pavel Goryaev
- Alla Demidova as Olga Svetilnikova
- Igor Kvasha as Viktor Vereshchagin
- Angelina Stepanova as Maria Goryaeva
- Igor Starygin as Vadim
- Vladislav Strzhelchik as Mikhail Tverskoy
- Valentin Gaft as director Znamensky
- Mikhail Kononov as Petya Strizhov
- Nikolay Trofimov as Pyotr Fomich
- Pavel Vinnik as Ferapontov
- Irina Murzaeva as old actress
- Nikolay Smorchkov as actor
- Valentina Telegina as episode

== See also ==
- Winter Evening in Gagra (1985)
