= Figure skating at the 2022 Winter Olympics – Team event =

2022 Winter Olympics event

Team event at the XXIV Olympic Winter Games
- Venue: Capital Indoor Stadium; Beijing, China
- Dates: 4–7 February 2022
- Competitors: 66 skaters from 10 nations
- Teams: 10
- Winning score: 65 points

Medalists
1st place, gold medalist(s)		United States; Nathan Chen, Vincent Zhou, Karen Chen, Alexa Knierim, Brandon Frazier, Madison Hubbell, Zachary Donohue, Madison Chock, Evan Bates
2nd place, silver medalist(s)		Japan; Shoma Uno, Yuma Kagiyama, Wakaba Higuchi, Kaori Sakamoto, Riku Miura, Ryuichi Kihara, Misato Komatsubara, Tim Koleto
3rd place, bronze medalist(s)		ROC; Mark Kondratiuk, Anastasia Mishina, Aleksandr Galliamov, Victoria Sinitsina, Nikita Katsalapov

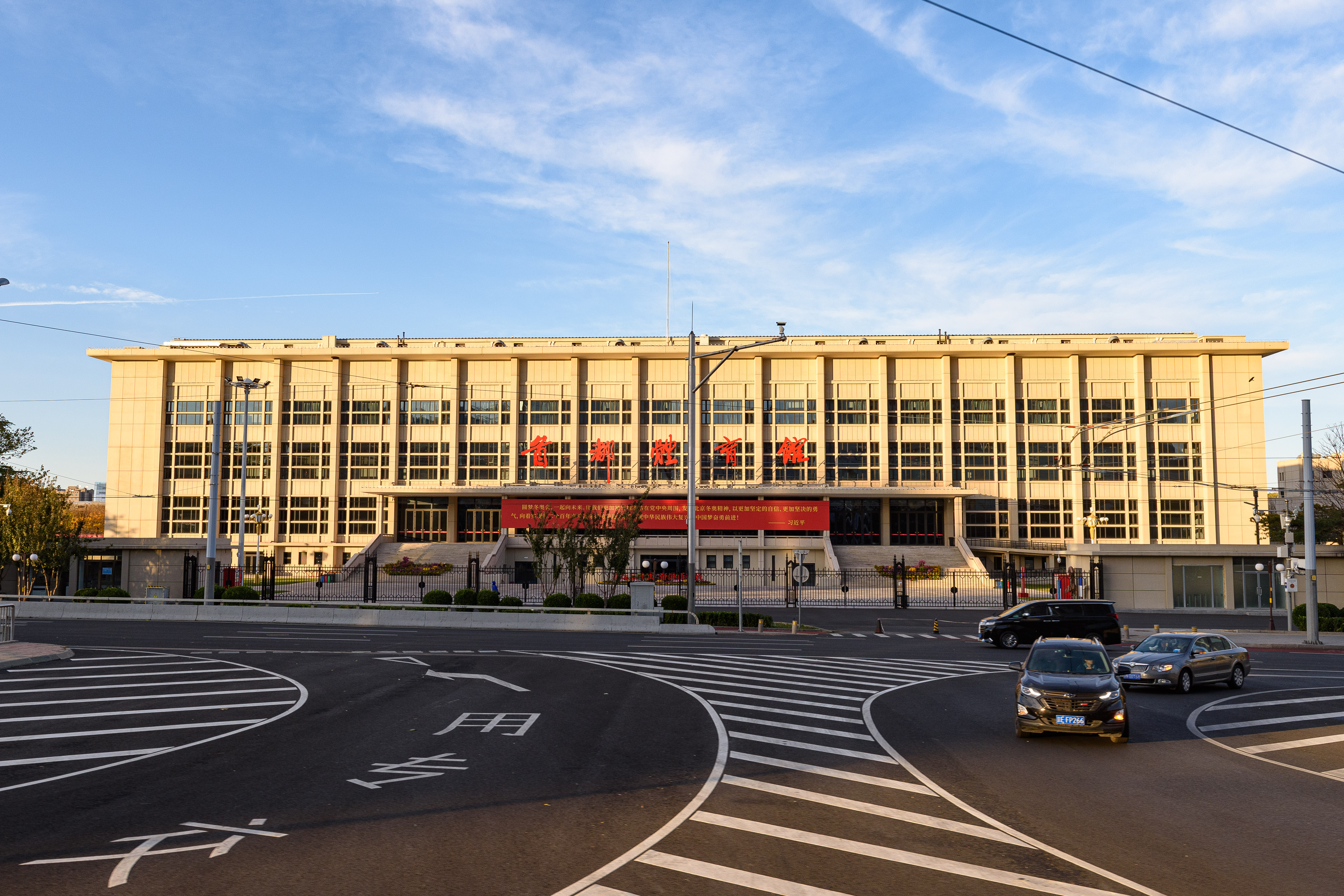
The figure skating events at the 2022 Winter Olympics were held at the Capital Indoor Stadium in Beijing, China.

The figure skating team event at the 2022 Winter Olympics was held between 4 and 7 February 2022 at the Capital Indoor Stadium in Beijing, China. The team event consisted of competitions in men's singles, women's singles, pair skating, and ice dance. Skaters and teams earned points based on their placements in each event, and the medalists were determined based on the total points earned. The team representing the Russian Olympic Committee originally finished in first place, while the team from the United States finished second, and the Japanese team finished third. However, when it was revealed that a sample submitted by Kamila Valieva of Russia had tested positive for a banned substance, the medal ceremony was postponed. After nearly two years of litigation, Valieva's scores were struck, and the team from the United States was awarded the gold medals, the Japanese team the silver, and the Russian team the bronze. The American and Japanese teams finally received their medals at a ceremony held in Paris during the 2024 Summer Olympics.

== Background ==
The team event is the newest Olympic figure skating event and was first contested at the 2014 Winter Olympics. The event combines the four Olympic figure skating disciplines (men's singles, women's singles, pair skating, and ice dance) into a single event; skaters earn points based on their placement in each discipline, and the gold medals are awarded to the team that earns the most placement points. At the 2018 Winter Olympics, Canada won the team event, the team representing the Olympic Athletes from Russia finished in second place, and the United States finished third.

In 2016, an independent report commissioned by the World Anti-Doping Agency (WADA) confirmed allegations that the Russian Olympic team had been involved in a state-sponsored doping program from at least late 2011 through February 2014, when Russia hosted the Winter Olympics in Sochi. On 9 December 2019, the WADA banned Russia from all international competitions after it found that data provided by the Russian Anti-Doping Agency had been manipulated by Russian authorities in order to protect athletes involved in its doping scheme. Under a ruling by the Court of Arbitration for Sport in December 2020, Russian athletes could not use the Russian flag or anthem in international competition and had to compete as "Neutral Athletes" or a "Neutral Team" at any world championships for the next two years. On 19 February 2021, it was announced that Russian athletes would compete under the name of the Russian Olympic Committee (ROC) at the 2020 Summer Olympics and 2022 Winter Olympics.

The figure skating team event at the 2022 Winter Olympics was held between 4 and 7 February 2022 at the Capital Indoor Stadium in Beijing, China. The Russian team was heavily favored to win the team event, with the United States, Canada, and Japan also expected to be in medal contention. In addition to having won the 2022 European Figure Skating Championships, (Note: Kamila Valieva's results from the 2022 European Championships were among the scores later invalidated by the Court of Arbitration for Sport.) Kamila Valieva had set new world records in both the free skate and total score at the 2021 Finlandia Trophy, bested those scores at the 2021 Skate Canada International just three weeks later, and then bested them again at the 2021 Rostelecom Cup. She was expected to dominate both the individual women's event and the women's segments of the team event.

The 2022 Winter Olympics took place over two years into the COVID-19 pandemic and most events were closed to the public, with only selected events open to invited guests at a reduced capacity. To minimize the risk of virus transmission, China implemented strict health and safety measures, including a closed-loop system that segregated participants from the general public, frequent testing, and quarantine protocols for participants. Amid increasing lockdowns across China and the first detected case of the Omicron variant in Beijing, ticket sales to the general public were cancelled and it was announced that limited numbers of spectators would be admitted by invitation only.

== Qualification ==
For the team event, scores from the 2021 World Figure Skating Championships and the 2021–22 Grand Prix Series were tabulated to establish the top ten nations. For a nation to qualify for the team event, it had to have qualified entrants in at least three of the four disciplines (men's singles, women's singles, pair skating, or ice dance). If there were not ten nations that had qualified entrants in all four disciplines, nations with only three entrants could use the ISU's "Additional Athletes Quota" to complete their team. These additional athletes were eligible to compete in the team event but not in the individual Olympic figure skating events.

Qualification for figure skating team event
Pl.	Nation	M	W	P	D	Total
1	ROC	Yes	Yes	Yes	Yes	5947
2	United States	Yes	Yes	Yes	Yes	5209
3	Canada	Yes	Yes	Yes	Yes	3949
4	Japan	Yes	Yes	Yes	Yes	3830
5	China	Yes	Yes	Yes	Yes	2809
6	Italy	Yes	(Note: Although Italy did not qualify a women's singles skater for the team event, they were able to use the Additional Athletes Quota to complete their team.)	Yes	Yes	2774
7	Germany	(Note: Although Germany did not qualify a men's singles skater for the team event, they were able to use the Additional Athletes Quota to complete their team.)	Yes	Yes	Yes	1480
8	Georgia	Yes	Yes	Yes	Yes	1472
9	Czech Republic	Yes	Yes	Yes	Yes	1137
10	Ukraine	Yes	Yes	(Note: Although Ukraine did not qualify a pairs team for the team event, they were able to use the Additional Athletes Quota to complete their team.)	Yes	893

== Entries ==
Code key

- SP – Short program
- FS – Free skate
- RD – Rhythm dance
- FD – Free dance

Member nations submitted the following entrants for the indicated segments in each discipline.

Team event entrants
Country	Men	Women	Pairs	Ice dance
Canada	Roman Sadovsky (SP/FS)	Madeline Schizas (SP/FS)	Kirsten Moore-Towers; Michael Marinaro; (SP)	Piper Gilles; Paul Poirier; (RD/FD)
Canada	Roman Sadovsky (SP/FS)	Madeline Schizas (SP/FS)	Vanessa James; Eric Radford; (FS)	Piper Gilles; Paul Poirier; (RD/FD)
China	Jin Boyang (SP/FS)	Zhu Yi (SP/FS)	Sui Wenjing; Han Cong; (SP)	Wang Shiyue; Liu Xinyu; (RD/FD)
China	Jin Boyang (SP/FS)	Zhu Yi (SP/FS)	Peng Cheng; Jin Yang; (FS)	Wang Shiyue; Liu Xinyu; (RD/FD)
Czech Republic	Michal Březina (SP)	Eliška Březinová (SP)	Jelizaveta Žuková; Martin Bidař; (SP)	Natálie Taschlerová; Filip Taschler; (RD)
Georgia	Morisi Kvitelashvili (SP)	Anastasiia Gubanova (SP)	Karina Safina; Luka Berulava; (SP)	Maria Kazakova; Georgy Reviya; (RD)
Germany	Paul Fentz (SP)	Nicole Schott (SP)	Minerva Fabienne Hase; Nolan Seegert; (Note: Nolan Seegert tested positive for COVID-19 prior to the team event and was unable to compete. As Germany's sole qualifiers for the pairs event, he and Minerva Fabienne Hase were unable to be replaced and Germany received no points for the pairs segment.)	Katharina Müller; Tim Dieck; (RD)
Italy	Daniel Grassl (SP)	Lara Naki Gutmann (SP)	Nicole Della Monica; Matteo Guarise; (SP)	Charlène Guignard; Marco Fabbri; (RD)
Japan	Shoma Uno (SP)	Wakaba Higuchi (SP)	Riku Miura; Ryuichi Kihara; (SP/FS)	Misato Komatsubara; Tim Koleto; (RD/FD)
Japan	Yuma Kagiyama (FS)	Kaori Sakamoto (FS)	Riku Miura; Ryuichi Kihara; (SP/FS)	Misato Komatsubara; Tim Koleto; (RD/FD)
ROC	Mark Kondratiuk (SP/FS)	Kamila Valieva (SP/FS) (Note: On 29 January 2024, the Court of Arbitration for Sport disqualified Kamila Valieva for four years retroactive to 25 December 2021. Valieva's results from the team event were vacated.)	Anastasia Mishina; Aleksandr Galliamov; (SP/FS)	Victoria Sinitsina; Nikita Katsalapov; (RD/FD)
Ukraine	Ivan Shmuratko (Note: Ivan Shmuratko tested positive for COVID-19 prior to the team event and was unable to compete. As Ukraine's sole qualifier for the men's event, he was unable to be replaced and Ukraine received no points for the men's segment.)	Anastasiia Shabotova (SP)	Sofiia Holichenko; Artem Darenskyi; (SP)	Oleksandra Nazarova; Maksym Nikitin; (RD)
United States	Nathan Chen (SP)	Karen Chen (SP/FS)	Alexa Knierim; Brandon Frazier; (SP/FS)	Madison Hubbell; Zachary Donohue; (RD)
United States	Vincent Zhou (FS)	Karen Chen (SP/FS)	Alexa Knierim; Brandon Frazier; (SP/FS)	Madison Chock; Evan Bates; (FD)

== Required performance elements ==
=== Single skating ===
Men competing in the team event performed their short programs on Friday, 4 February, while women performed theirs on 5 February. Lasting 2 minutes 40 seconds (+/− 10 seconds), the short program had to include the following elements:

For men: one double or triple Axel; one triple or quadruple jump; one jump combination consisting of a double jump and a triple jump, two triple jumps, or a quadruple jump and a double jump or triple jump; one flying spin; one camel spin or sit spin with a change of foot; one spin combination with a change of foot; and a step sequence using the full ice surface.

For women: one double or triple Axel; one triple jump; one jump combination consisting of a double jump and a triple jump, or two triple jumps; one flying spin; one layback spin, sideways leaning spin, camel spin, or sit spin without a change of foot; one spin combination with a change of foot; and one step sequence using the full ice surface.

The five teams with the most points after the first round advanced to the final round. Regardless of their scores in the short program, the men from the top five teams performed their free skates on 5 February, while the women performed theirs on 7 February. Lasting 4 minutes (+/− 10 seconds), the free skate had to include the following: seven jump elements, of which one had to be an Axel-type jump; three spins, of which one had to be a spin combination, one a flying spin, and one a spin with only one position; a step sequence; and a choreographic sequence.

=== Pair skating ===
Pairs competing in the team event performed their short programs on 4 February. Lasting 2 minutes 40 seconds (+/− 10 seconds), the short program had to include the following elements: one pair lift, one twist lift, one double or triple throw jump, one double or triple solo jump, one solo spin combination with a change of foot, one death spiral, and a step sequence using the full ice surface.

The five teams with the most points after the first round advanced to the final round. Regardless of their scores in the short program, the couples from the top five teams performed their free skates on 7 February. Lasting 4 minutes (+/− 10 seconds), the free skate had to include the following: three pair lifts, of which one had to be a twist lift; two different throw jumps; one solo jump; one jump combination or sequence; one pair spin combination; one death spiral; and a choreographic sequence.

=== Ice dance ===
Ice dance couples competing in the team event performed their rhythm dances on 4 February. Lasting 2 minutes 50 seconds (+/− 10 seconds), the theme of the rhythm dance this season was "street dance rhythms". Examples of applicable dance styles included hip-hop, disco, swing, krump, popping, funk, jazz, reggae (reggaeton), and blues. The required pattern dance element was the Midnight Blues. The rhythm dance had to include the following elements: the pattern dance, the pattern dance step sequence, one dance lift, one set of sequential twizzles, and one step sequence.

The five teams with the most points after the first round advanced to the final round. Regardless of their scores in the rhythm dance, the couples from the top five teams performed their free dances on 7 February. Lasting 4 minutes (+/− 10 seconds), the free dance had to include the following: three dance lifts, one dance spin, one set of synchronized twizzles, one step sequence in hold, one step sequence while on one skate and not in hold, and three choreographic elements, of which one had to be a choreographic character step sequence.

== Judging ==
Skaters were judged according to the required technical elements of their program (such as jumps and spins), as well as the overall presentation of their program, based on five program components (skating skills, transitions, performance, composition, and musical interpretation). Each technical element in a figure skating performance was assigned a predetermined base point value and scored by a panel of nine judges on a scale from −5 to +5 based on the quality of its execution. Each Grade of Execution (GOE) from –5 to +5 was assigned a value as indicated on the Scale of Values. (Note: The International Skating Union had originally published a new Scale of Values for the 2020/21 season, but chose to cancel it, reverting back to the scale from the 2019/20 season.) For example, a triple Axel was worth a base value of 8.00 points, and a GOE of +3 was worth 2.40 points, so a triple Axel with a GOE of +3 earned 10.40 points. The judging panel's GOE for each element was determined by calculating the trimmed mean (the average after discarding the highest and lowest scores). The panel's scores for all elements were added together to generate a Total Elements Score. At the same time, the judges evaluated each performance based on the five aforementioned program components and assigned each a score from 0.25 to 10 in 0.25-point increments. The judging panel's final score for each program component was also determined by calculating the trimmed mean. Those scores were then multiplied by the factor shown on the chart below; the results were added together to generate a total Program Component Score.

Program component factoring
Discipline	Short program or Rhythm dance	Free skate or Free dance
Men	1.00	2.00
Women	0.80	1.60
Pairs	0.80	1.60
Ice dance	0.80	1.20

Deductions were applied for certain violations, such as time infractions or falls. The Total Elements Score and Program Component Score were then added together, minus any deductions, to generate a final performance score for each skater or team.

== Team event scoring ==
The ten skaters or teams in each discipline performed their short programs and rhythm dances first, and they were judged just as they would be at any other figure skating competition. The skater or team in each discipline who received the highest score earned ten points, the next highest score earned nine points, and so on. Once all four events were held, the points earned in each event were totaled, and the five teams with the highest totals moved on to the final round. Teams could elect to substitute up to two skaters or teams at this point. The five skaters or teams in each discipline then performed their free skates and free dances, and again received scores from the judges. The skater or team in each discipline who received the highest score earned ten points, and so on. Once all four events were held, the points earned over both rounds were totaled to determine the medalists.

== Medal summary ==
Medal summary
Gold	Silver	Bronze
United States: Nathan Chen; Vincent Zhou; Karen Chen; Alexa Knierim; Brandon Frazier; Madison Hubbell; Zachary Donohue; Madison Chock; Evan Bates	Japan: Shoma Uno; Yuma Kagiyama; Wakaba Higuchi; Kaori Sakamoto; Riku Miura; Ryuichi Kihara; Misato Komatsubara; Tim Koleto	(Russia) ROC: Mark Kondratiuk; Anastasia Mishina; Aleksandr Galliamov; Victoria Sinitsina; Nikita Katsalapov

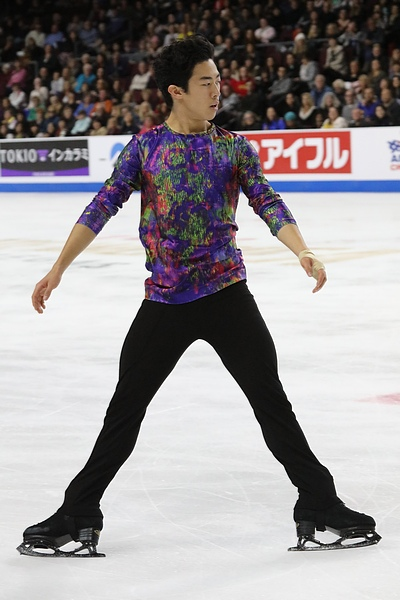
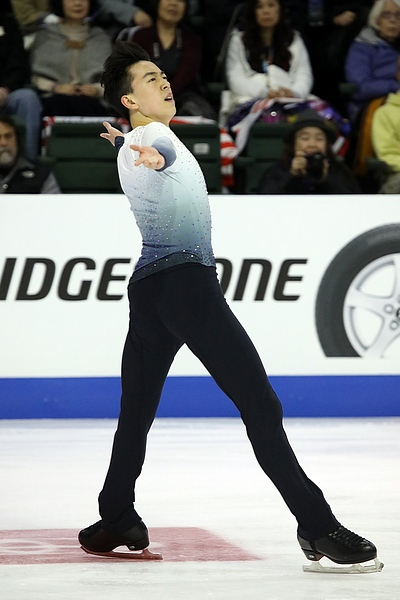
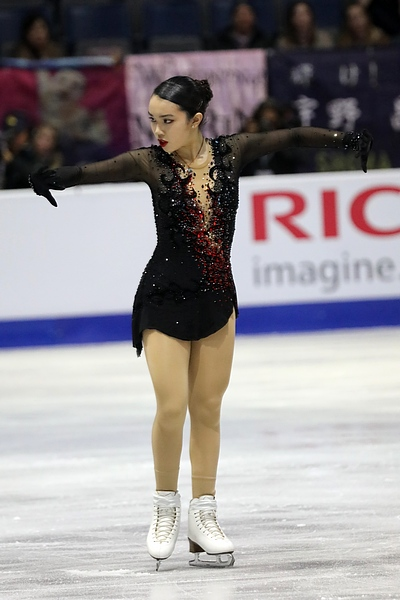
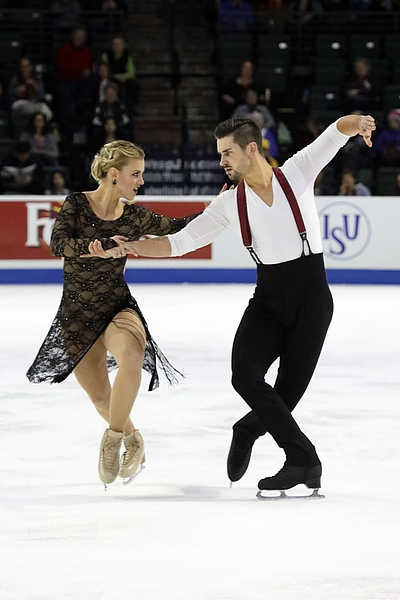
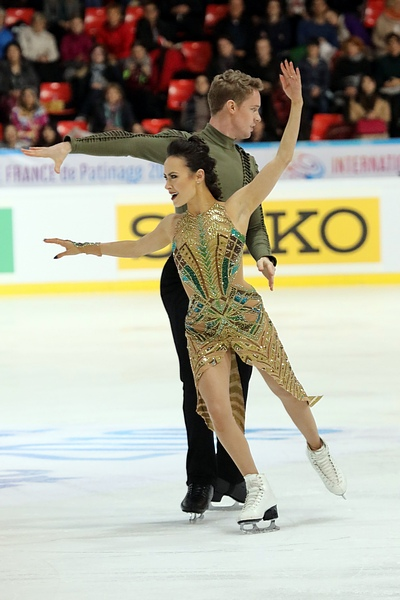
The U.S. figure skating team and gold medalists from the 2022 Winter Olympics (from left to right):
Nathan Chen; Vincent Zhou; Karen Chen; Madison Hubbell and Zachary Donohue; and Madison Chock and Evan Bates
(Not pictured: Alexa Knierim and Brandon Frazier)

== Results (qualifying round) ==
Code key

- TSS – Total Segment Score
- TES – Total Elements Score
- PCS – Program Component Score
- SS – Skating skills
- TR – Transitions
- PE – Performance
- CO – Composition
- IN – Musical interpretation/Timing
- DED – Deductions

=== Men's singles ===
The men's short program was held on 4 February. Ivan Shmuratko of Ukraine was forced to withdraw from the team event after he tested positive for COVID-19. Since Ukraine had no other men competing in single skating at the Olympics, they could not offer a substitute, so Ukraine received zero points for the men's event. Additionally, Keegan Messing of Canada, who had been scheduled to compete in the team event, was denied entry to China after a positive COVID-19 test. He was required to provide four negative COVID-19 tests, two each 24 hours apart, before he would be allowed to enter China. That last test result was received on 4 February – the first day of the team event – so Roman Sadovsky competed in his place.

Nathan Chen of the United States, having won three consecutive World Championships and six consecutive U.S. Championships, was heavily favored to win a gold medal at the 2022 Winter Olympics. Chen, who had performed below expectations at the 2018 Winter Olympics, finished in first place after the short program, setting a new season-best score of 111.71, which was also the second-highest short program score in history. Shoma Uno of Japan, who had won the silver medal in the men's individual event at the 2018 Winter Olympics, finished in second place with a new personal-best score. Mark Kondratiuk of Russia, who had previously won the 2022 European Championships, finished in third place. Roman Sadovsky, who had only found out he would compete in the team event the night before, had a failed quadruple jump and finished in eighth place.

Men's short program results
Pl.	Skater	Nation	TSS	TES	PCS	SS	TR	PE	CO	IN	DED	Pts.
1	Nathan Chen	United States	111.71	63.85	47.86	9.54	9.39	9.64	9.61	9.68	0.00	10
2	Shoma Uno	Japan	105.46	58.89	46.57	9.43	9.07	9.39	9.32	9.36	0.00	9
3	Mark Kondratiuk	ROC	95.81	52.81	43.00	8.57	8.29	8.64	8.75	8.75	0.00	8
4	Morisi Kvitelashvili	Georgia	92.37	50.63	41.74	8.39	8.21	8.43	8.39	8.32	0.00	7
5	Daniel Grassl	Italy	88.10	47.18	40.92	8.18	8.00	8.21	8.32	8.21	0.00	6
6	Jin Boyang	China	82.87	43.91	39.96	8.21	7.71	7.89	8.11	8.04	1.00	5
7	Michal Březina	Czech Republic	76.77	36.63	40.14	8.21	7.75	8.00	8.11	8.07	0.00	4
8	Roman Sadovsky	Canada	71.06	32.27	38.79	7.79	7.64	7.61	7.86	7.89	0.00	3
9	Paul Fentz	Germany	68.64	33.43	35.21	7.21	6.89	6.93	7.18	7.00	0.00	2
WD	Ivan Shmuratko	Ukraine	Withdrew from competition									0

=== Ice dance ===
The rhythm dance was held on 4 February 2022. After an uncharacteristic error in their rhythm dance at the 2022 U.S. Championships that caused them to finish in second place, Madison Hubbell and Zachary Donohue of the United States finished in first place, setting a new season-best score in the process. Hubbell and Donohue's twizzles were judged level four (the highest possible of four levels) and their pattern dance a level three.

Victoria Sinitsina and Nikita Katsalapov of Russia, who had won the 2021 World Championships, finished a close second. They earned a level four on their pattern dance, but Katsalapov's twizzles were judged a level three, while Sinitsina's were judged a level four. Charlène Guignard and Marco Fabbri of Italy finished in third place, receiving level four scores for their stationary lift, twizzles, and pattern dance step sequence. Piper Gilles and Paul Poirier of Canada, who had won the bronze medals at the 2021 World Championships, had a solid performance, finishing fourth.

Rhythm dance results
Pl.	Team	Nation	TSS	TES	PCS	SS	TR	PE	CO	IN	Pts.
1	Madison Hubbell; Zachary Donohue	United States	86.56	48.50	38.06	9.50	9.32	9.57	9.54	9.64	10
2	Victoria Sinitsina; Nikita Katsalapov	ROC	85.05	46.92	38.13	9.50	9.46	9.43	9.64	9.64	9
3	Charlène Guignard; Marco Fabbri	Italy	83.83	47.12	36.71	9.14	9.04	9.29	9.21	9.21	8
4	Piper Gilles; Paul Poirier	Canada	82.72	45.47	37.25	9.25	9.11	9.43	9.39	9.39	7
5	Wang Shiyue; Liu Xinyu	China	74.66	41.66	33.00	8.25	8.07	8.39	8.21	8.32	6
6	Natálie Taschlerová; Filip Taschler	Czech Republic	68.99	38.68	30.31	7.54	7.36	7.68	7.64	7.68	5
7	Misato Komatsubara; Tim Koleto	Japan	66.54	37.15	29.39	7.32	7.18	7.39	7.39	7.46	4
8	Maria Kazakova; Georgy Reviya	Georgia	64.60	35.00	29.60	7.36	7.21	7.50	7.46	7.46	3
9	Oleksandra Nazarova; Maksym Nikitin	Ukraine	64.08	34.16	29.92	7.50	7.36	7.54	7.43	7.57	2
10	Katharina Müller; Tim Dieck	Germany	63.21	33.53	29.69	7.36	7.25	7.46	7.54	7.50	1

=== Pairs ===
The pairs short program was held on 4 February 2022. Minerva Fabienne Hase and Nolan Seegert of Germany were forced to withdraw from the team event after Seegert tested positive for COVID-19. Since Germany had no other teams competing in pair skating at the Olympics, they could not offer a substitute, so Germany received zero points for the pairs event.

Sui Wenjing and Han Cong of China set a new world-record score in the pairs short program with a score of 82.83. Their routine was described by Paula Slater of Golden Skate as "flawless", with solid side-by-side triple toe loops, a throw triple flip, and elements all graded at level four. Anastasia Mishina and Aleksandr Galliamov of Russia finished in second place after a solid performance that set a new personal-best score and garnered level four values in all elements. Alexa Knierim and Brandon Frazier of the United States, who had earlier had to withdraw from the 2022 U.S. Championships when Frazier tested positive for COVID-19, finished in third place with a new personal-best score. Riku Miura and Ryuichi Kihara of Japan also set a new personal-best score and finished in fourth place.

Pairs short program results
Pl.	Team	Nation	TSS	TES	PCS	SS	TR	PE	CO	IN	DED	Pts.
1	Sui Wenjing; Han Cong	China	82.83	44.97	37.86	9.36	9.25	9.64	9.54	9.54	0.00	10
2	Anastasia Mishina; Aleksandr Galliamov	ROC	82.64	45.22	37.42	9.25	9.21	9.46	9.43	9.43	0.00	9
3	Alexa Knierim; Brandon Frazier	United States	75.00	41.02	33.98	8.36	8.39	8.61	8.54	8.57	0.00	8
4	Riku Miura; Ryuichi Kihara	Japan	74.45	39.83	34.62	8.68	8.64	8.68	8.75	8.54	0.00	7
5	Kirsten Moore-Towers; Michael Marinaro	Canada	67.34	34.06	33.28	8.29	8.18	8.25	8.43	8.46	0.00	6
6	Karina Safina; Luka Berulava	Georgia	64.79	35.59	29.20	7.39	7.21	7.32	7.29	7.29	0.00	5
7	Nicole Della Monica; Matteo Guarise	Italy	60.30	30.75	30.55	7.82	7.50	7.29	7.86	7.71	1.00	4
8	Jelizaveta Žuková; Martin Bidař	Czech Republic	56.70	30.01	27.69	7.07	6.71	6.71	7.07	7.04	1.00	3
9	Sofiia Holichenko; Artem Darenskyi	Ukraine	53.65	28.23	25.42	6.39	6.18	6.29	6.64	6.29	0.00	2
WD	Minerva Fabienne Hase; Nolan Seegert	Germany	Withdrew from competition									0

=== Women's singles ===
The women's short program was held on 5 February 2022. Kamila Valieva of Russia, who had set a new world record in the short program at the 2022 European Championships, finished in first place, outscoring Wakaba Higuchi of Japan by more than fifteen points. Valieva performed a triple Axel, making her only the fourth woman to successfully perform one at the Olympics. Tara Lipinski, Olympic gold medalist and figure skating commentator for NBC Sports, said that "a talent like this comes along once in a lifetime." At the time, Valieva's first-place finish gave the Russian team the points they needed to move into first place. However, Valieva's achievements at both the European Championships and the Winter Olympics were later nullified by her retroactive disqualification in 2024.

Wakaba Higuchi delivered a solid performance that included three triple jumps to finish in second place. Madeline Schizas of Canada finished in third place with what Brandon Penny of NBC News called a "standout performance", earning a new personal-best score and ensuring that the Canadian team would advance to the second round of the competition. Karen Chen of the United States, who had performed below expectations at the 2018 Winter Olympics, finished in fifth place after falling on her triple loop.

Women's short program results
Pl.	Skater	Nation	TSS	TES	PCS	SS	TR	PE	CO	IN	DED	Pts.
1	Wakaba Higuchi	Japan	74.73	40.54	34.19	8.61	8.32	8.57	8.61	8.61	0.00	9
2	Madeline Schizas	Canada	69.60	37.56	32.04	7.86	7.79	8.25	8.04	8.11	0.00	8
3	Anastasiia Gubanova	Georgia	67.56	36.90	30.66	7.71	7.39	7.75	7.61	7.86	0.00	7
4	Karen Chen	United States	65.20	32.72	33.48	8.39	8.21	8.21	8.46	8.57	1.00	6
5	Nicole Schott	Germany	62.66	32.52	30.14	7.50	7.39	7.61	7.54	7.64	0.00	5
6	Anastasiia Shabotova	Ukraine	62.49	35.63	26.86	6.68	6.50	6.79	6.82	6.79	0.00	4
7	Eliška Březinová	Czech Republic	61.05	33.97	27.08	6.79	6.50	7.00	6.64	6.93	0.00	3
8	Lara Naki Gutmann	Italy	58.52	30.78	27.74	6.79	6.93	7.00	6.96	7.00	0.00	2
9	Zhu Yi	China	47.03	22.34	25.69	6.57	6.46	6.07	6.64	6.36	1.00	1
DSQ	Kamila Valieva	ROC	~~90.18~~	~~51.67~~	~~38.51~~	~~9.46~~	~~9.43~~	~~9.82~~	~~9.71~~	~~9.71~~	~~0.00~~	~~10~~ (Note: Kamila Valieva originally finished in first place, earning ten points for the Russian team, but on 29 January 2024, the Court of Arbitration for Sport disqualified Valieva for four years retroactive to 25 December 2021. Valieva's results from the team event were vacated; however, the points were not re-allocated.)

=== Overall ===
Code key

- M-SP – Men's short program
- D-RD – Rhythm dance
- P-SP – Pairs short program
- W-SP – Women's short program

Upon completion of the women's short program, the top five teams were cleared to move on to the second round of competition. With Kamila Valieva's disqualification not yet in effect, the Russian team was in the lead with 36 points, followed by the United States, Japan, Canada, and China. The bottom five teams – Georgia, Italy, the Czech Republic, Germany, and Ukraine – were eliminated from the competition. Valieva's eventual disqualification deducted ten points from the Russian score, retroactively demoting them to third place at this stage of the competition and elevating the United States and Japan to first and second, respectively.

Team event results after first round
Pl.	Nation	M-SP	D-RD	P-SP	W-SP	Pts.	Status
1	United States	10	10	8	6	34	Advanced to final round
2	Japan	9	4	7	9	29	Advanced to final round
3	ROC	8	9	9	~~10~~ (DSQ)	~~36~~; 26	Advanced to final round
4	Canada	3	7	6	8	24	Advanced to final round
5	China	5	6	10	1	22	Advanced to final round
6	Georgia	7	3	5	7	22	Did not advance to final round
7	Italy	6	8	4	2	20	Did not advance to final round
8	Czech Republic	4	5	3	3	15	Did not advance to final round
9	Germany	2	1	0	5	8	Did not advance to final round
10	Ukraine	0	2	2	4	8	Did not advance to final round

== Results (final round) ==
Code key

- TSS – Total Segment Score
- TES – Total Elements Score
- PCS – Program Component Score
- SS – Skating skills
- TR – Transitions
- PE – Performance
- CO – Composition
- IN – Musical interpretation/Timing
- DED – Deductions

=== Men's singles ===
The men's free skate was held on 5 February 2022. Yuma Kagiyama of Japan, who had won the silver medal at the 2021 World Championships, finished in first place, successfully landing four quadruple jumps and two triple Axels, and shattering his personal-best score by over eleven points. Kagiyama was only the third person to ever score above 200 points in the free skate, joining Nathan Chen of the United States and Yuzuru Hanyu of Japan.

Mark Kondratiuk of Russia finished in second place with a performance that featured three quadruple jumps. Vincent Zhou of the United States finished in third place after performing the Crouching Tiger, Hidden Dragon routine that he had originally performed in 2019. Zhou had wanted to perform this routine – Crouching Tiger, Hidden Dragon being based on a Chinese novel and starring a cast of Chinese actors – before the all-Chinese audience at the Olympics. It was also dedicated to his parents who had emigrated from China in 1992. Zhou later tested positive for COVID-19 and was forced to withdraw from the men's individual event, rendering this his only performance at the Olympics.

Roman Sadovsky of Canada finished in last place, nearly thirty points behind Jin Boyang of China. Sadovsky's last-place finish, coupled with Kagiyama's first-place finish, put the Canadian team into fourth place, nine points behind Japan. Sadovsky had an error on his opening quadruple Salchow, and then continued to make a series of errors as his program progressed. "Definitely not the outcome I hoped for," he stated afterward. "I've had some good skates, some not so good skates, but this one is definitely closer to not so good."

Men's free skate results
Pl.	Name	Nation	TSS	TES	PCS	SS	TR	PE	CO	IN	DED	Pts.
1	Yuma Kagiyama	Japan	208.94	116.50	92.44	9.29	9.00	9.43	9.25	9.25	0.00	10
2	Mark Kondratiuk	ROC	181.65	95.09	86.56	8.75	8.39	8.75	8.68	8.71	0.00	9
3	Vincent Zhou	United States	171.44	85.24	86.20	8.71	8.46	8.54	8.75	8.64	0.00	8
4	Jin Boyang	China	155.04	78.26	76.78	7.93	7.32	7.75	7.75	7.64	0.00	7
5	Roman Sadovsky	Canada	122.60	50.10	74.50	7.57	7.36	7.14	7.68	7.50	2.00	6

=== Pairs ===
The pairs free skate was held on 7 February 2022. Anastasia Mishina and Aleksandr Galliamov of Russia finished in first place despite an unexpected fall during their final lift. In 2021, Mishina and Galliamov had already made history by being the first pairs team in thirty-five years to win the World Championships in their debut appearance. They had also recently won the 2022 European Championships, setting new world records in all segments in the process. Riku Miura and Ryuichi Kihara of Japan finished in second place, while Peng Cheng and Jin Yang of China finished in third. Alexa Knierim and Brandon Frazier of the United States, who were in third place after the short program, finished in fifth place after Knierim improperly landed a triple jump as a single and under-rotated another.

Pairs free skate results
Pl.	Team	Nation	TSS	TES	PCS	SS	TR	PE	CO	IN	DED	Pts.
1	Anastasia Mishina; Aleksandr Galliamov	ROC	145.20	74.97	72.23	9.07	9.04	8.75	9.25	9.04	2.00	10
2	Riku Miura; Ryuichi Kihara	Japan	139.60	70.11	69.49	8.68	8.64	8.86	8.68	8.57	0.00	9
3	Peng Cheng; Jin Yang	China	131.75	63.35	68.40	8.54	8.43	8.46	8.75	8.57	0.00	8
4	Vanessa James; Eric Radford	Canada	130.07	64.46	65.61	8.11	8.04	8.32	8.25	8.29	0.00	7
5	Alexa Knierim; Brandon Frazier	United States	128.97	62.74	66.23	8.36	8.21	8.11	8.39	8.32	0.00	6

=== Ice dance ===
The free dance was held on 7 February 2022. Madison Chock and Evan Bates of the United States delivered "an excellent and engaging program" to finish in first place, narrowly beating out Victoria Sinitsina and Nikita Katsalapov of Russia. Chock and Bates' free skate featured music from Daft Punk, with Chock dressed as an alien and Bates as an astronaut. Their performance netted a season-best score. "We have an opportunity to inspire the next generation of American skaters with what we do here," Bates said after the team event had concluded, "because let's be honest, [there are] so many new eyes, so many new viewers to our sport at this event; that's what makes it so unique." Sinitsina and Katsalapov delivered a "beautiful performance", which Olympic silver medalist and NBC News ice dance commentator Tanith Belbin White described as "the best", finishing in second place.

Ice dance free dance results
Pl.	Team	Nation	TSS	TES	PCS	SS	TR	PE	CO	IN	DED	Pts.
1	Madison Chock; Evan Bates	United States	129.07	71.81	57.26	9.43	9.29	9.64	9.71	9.64	0.00	10
2	Victoria Sinitsina; Nikita Katsalapov	ROC	128.17	71.42	57.75	9.61	9.46	9.71	9.64	9.71	1.00	9
3	Piper Gilles; Paul Poirier	Canada	124.39	68.73	55.66	9.21	9.11	9.32	9.36	9.38	0.00	8
4	Wang Shiyue; Liu Xinyu	China	107.18	57.41	49.77	8.29	8.14	8.36	8.39	8.29	0.00	7
5	Misato Komatsubara; Tim Koleto	Japan	98.66	54.29	44.37	7.36	7.25	7.43	7.54	7.39	0.00	6

=== Women's singles ===
The women's free skate was held on 7 February 2022. Kamila Valieva of Russia originally finished in first place, becoming the first woman to not only successfully perform a quadruple jump at the Olympics, but to perform two. Despite falling on an attempted third quadruple jump, Valieva still finished with a margin of over thirty points ahead of Kaori Sakamoto of Japan. However, all of Valieva's achievements here were eventually nullified by her later disqualification. Karen Chen of the United States, who had made several errors in her short program, delivered a much stronger free skate, crying tears of happiness and guaranteeing the United States a silver medal finish. Madeline Schizas of Canada finished in third place with what Zack Smart of CBC Sports called a "nearly flawless skate" that beat her previous personal-best score and included several triple jump combinations. It was, however, not enough to pull the Canadian team into third place, as they were already too far behind in the ranking to make up the difference.

Women's free skate results
Pl.	Skater	Nation	TSS	TES	PCS	SS	TR	PE	CO	IN	DED	Pts.
1	Kaori Sakamoto	Japan	148.66	76.93	71.73	9.11	8.79	9.04	8.93	8.96	0.00	9
2	Madeline Schizas	Canada	132.04	67.53	64.51	8.00	7.86	8.14	8.18	8.14	0.00	8
3	Karen Chen	United States	131.52	65.68	65.84	8.25	7.96	8.29	8.29	8.36	0.00	7
4	Zhu Yi	China	91.41	42.79	50.62	6.54	6.21	6.07	6.57	6.25	2.00	6
DSQ	Kamila Valieva	ROC	~~178.92~~	~~105.25~~	~~74.67~~	~~9.39~~	~~9.21~~	~~9.32~~	~~9.50~~	~~9.25~~	~~0.00~~	~~10~~

=== Overall ===
Code key

- M-SP – Men's short program
- D-RD – Rhythm dance
- P-SP – Pairs short program
- W-SP – Women's short program
- M-FS – Men's free skate
- P-FS – Pairs free skate
- D-FD – Free dance
- W-FS – Women's free skate

The team representing the Russian Olympic Committee initially won the event, nine points ahead of the United States team, who finished second. The Japanese team had originally finished in third place. However, after the Court of Arbitration for Sport suspended Kamila Valieva for four years retroactive to 25 December 2021, the International Olympic Committee re-allocated the medals, upgrading the United States to gold and Japan to silver, while downgrading the Russian team to bronze.

Team event results after second round
Pl.	Nation	M-SP	D-RD	P-SP	W-SP	M-FS	P-FS	D-FD	W-FS	Pts.
1st place, gold medalist(s)	United States	10	10	8	6	8	6	10	7	65
2nd place, silver medalist(s)	Japan	9	4	7	9	10	9	6	9	63
3rd place, bronze medalist(s)	ROC	8	9	9	~~10~~ (DSQ)	9	10	9	~~10~~ (DSQ)	~~74~~; 54
4	Canada	3	7	6	8	6	7	8	8	53
5	China	5	6	10	1	7	8	7	6	50

== Records ==
The following new record high score was set during this event.

Record high scores
Date	Skater(s)	Segment	Score	Ref.
4 February	(China); Sui Wenjing; Han Cong	Pairs' short program	82.83	

== Aftermath ==
The medal ceremony originally scheduled for Tuesday, 8 February, was delayed over what International Olympic Committee (IOC) spokesperson Mark Adams described as a situation that required "legal consultation" with the International Skating Union (ISU). Media outlets reported on 9 February that the issue was a positive drug test, administered in December 2021, for trimetazidine by Kamila Valieva, which was officially confirmed on 11 February. The Russian Anti-Doping Agency (RUSADA), under suspension from the World Anti-Doping Agency (WADA) for hiding the positive doping results of Russian athletes for years, cleared Valieva to compete on 9 February, a day after the December test results were released. The IOC and the ISU appealed that decision.

On 14 February, the Court of Arbitration for Sport (CAS) ruled that Valieva be allowed to compete in the individual women's event, on grounds that preventing her from competing "would cause her irreparable harm in the circumstances", though her gold medal in the team event was still under consideration. The favorable decision from the Court was made in part due to her age, as minor athletes were subject to different rules than adult athletes. The IOC announced that the medal ceremony would not take place until the investigation was over and there was a concrete decision on whether to strip Russia of their medals.

In mid-November, the WADA requested that CAS take up a review of the case, seeking a four-year suspension of Valieva, which would exclude her from competition at the 2026 Winter Olympics, and to disqualify all of her results dating back to the date of her positive drug test (25 December 2021). WADA President Witold Bańka wrote that RUSADA did not meet a WADA-imposed deadline to deliver a verdict on Valieva's case. In January 2023, RUSADA cleared Valieva of any wrongdoing. Travis Tygart, CEO of the U.S. Anti-Doping Agency (USADA), criticized both WADA and the ISU for not taking the matter directly to the CAS.

WADA and the ISU have to appeal this decision, for the sake of the credibility of the anti-doping system and the rights of all athletes. The world can't possibly accept this self-serving decision by RUSADA, which in the recent past has been a key instrument of Russia's state sponsored doping fraud and is non-compliant. Justice demands a full, fair, public hearing outside of Russia.

— Travis Tygart, CEO of the U.S. Anti-Doping Agency (USADA)

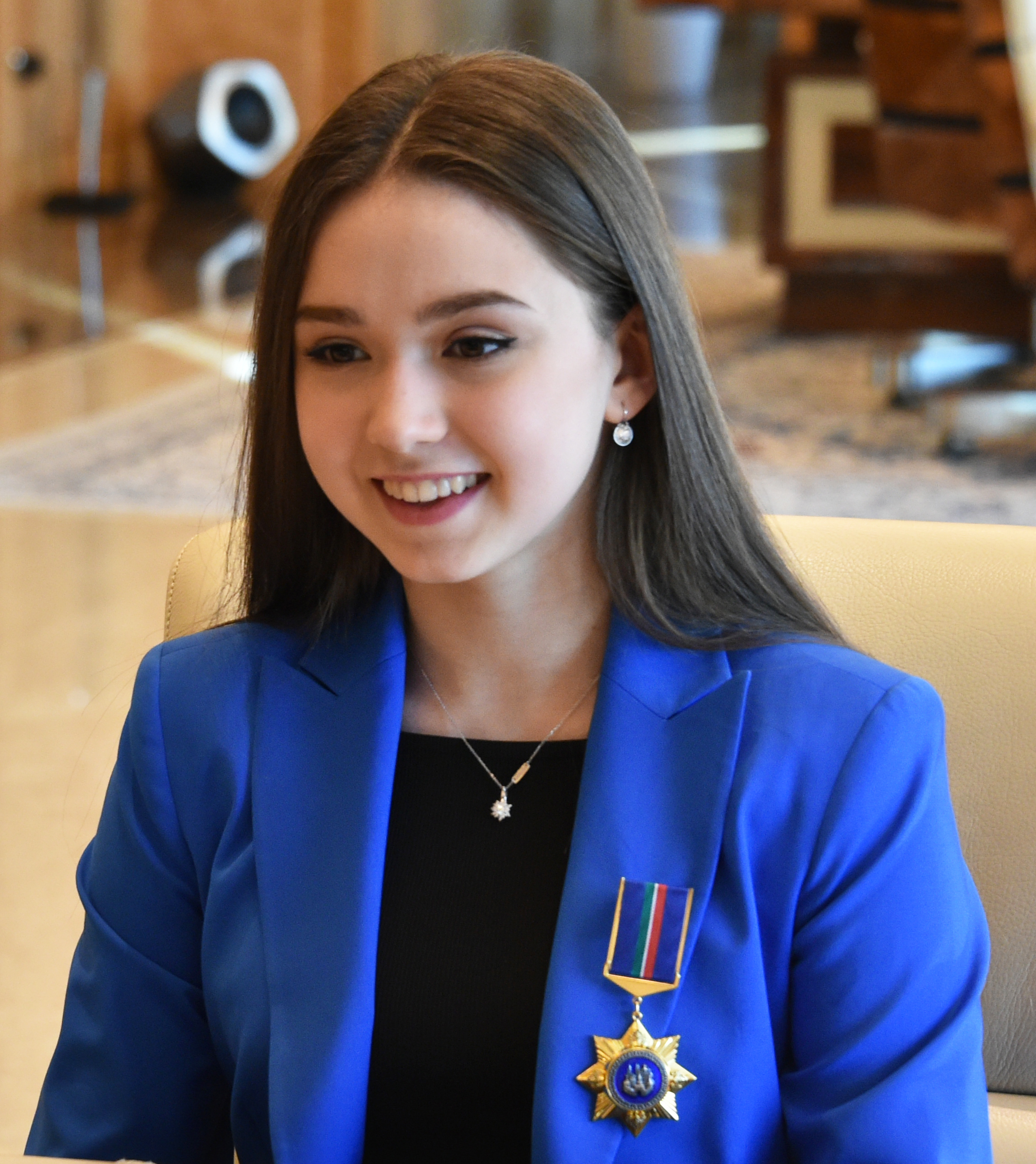
After testing positive for trimetazidine, Kamila Valieva of Russia was suspended by the Court of Arbitration for Sport for a period of four years for an anti-doping rule violation. Her results from the Olympic team event were stricken.

On 29 January 2024, the CAS disqualified Valieva for four years retroactive to 25 December 2021 for the positive test for trimetazidine, which they ruled constituted an anti-doping rule violation. On 30 January 2024, the ISU, among other actions, subtracted Valieva's points from Russia's score without changing any other scores, and reallocated the medals in the figure skating team event, upgrading the United States and Japan to gold and silver, respectively, while downgrading Russia to bronze. Skate Canada accused the ISU of not following its own rule, which required that "competitors having finished the competition and who initially placed lower than [a] disqualified competitor will move up accordingly in their placement". Had the other women in the team event received one additional point each for moving up one place, each of the other four teams in the final would have earned two additional points, including Canada, which would have placed them ahead of Russia. In a statement on 9 February, the ISU contended that the rule did not apply in this case: "In any complex and extraordinary situation like this, the reallocation of points could negatively affect the relative team ranking, adversely impacting teams that had nothing to do with the incident in question".

The Canadian Olympic Committee (COC), Skate Canada, and the members of the Canadian figure skating team appealed the decision to the CAS, requesting that two points be added to the scores of the teams from the United States, Japan, Canada, and China; thus awarding the Canadian team the bronze. Three separate Russian appeals were also filed – one each by the ROC, the Russian Figure Skating Federation, and the Russian team (which included Valieva) – requesting reinstatement of the gold medals. All four appeals named the ISU as defendant, with the Canadian appeal additionally including all three Russia appellants and the IOC as defendants. The Russian appeals were dismissed on 25 July; the Canadian appeal was dismissed on 1 August, thereby finalizing the results.

At the ISU Congress held in June 2022, members of the ISU Council accepted a proposal to gradually increase the minimum age for senior competition to seventeen beginning with the 2024–2025 season. So as to avoid forcing skaters who had already competed at the senior level to return to the junior level, the age limit remained unchanged during the 2022–2023 season, before increasing to sixteen for the 2023–2024 season, and then seventeen for the 2024–2025 season. Although there had been previous proposals to increase this age limit, the 2022 vote gained traction following the 2022 Winter Olympics, where Valieva had only been fifteen years old when she competed.

== Medal ceremony ==
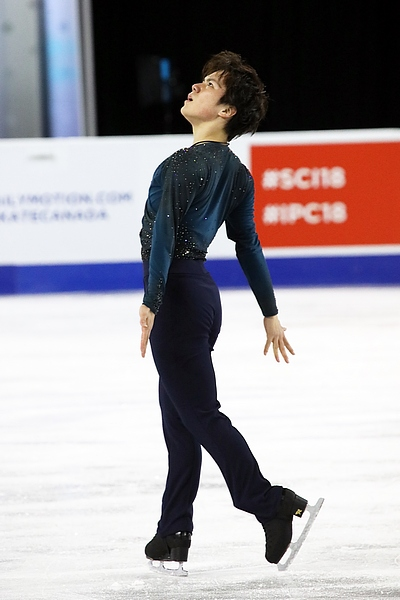
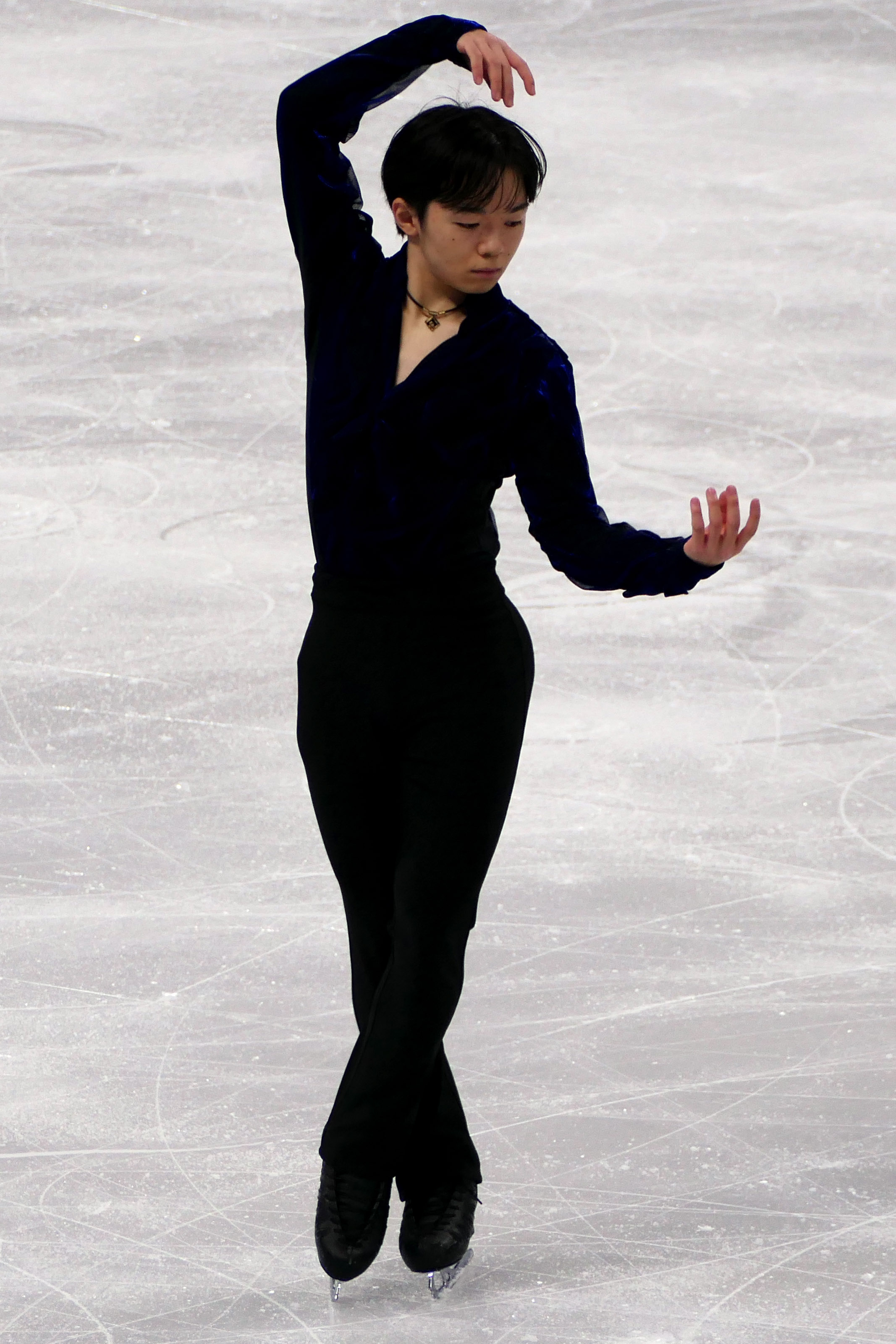
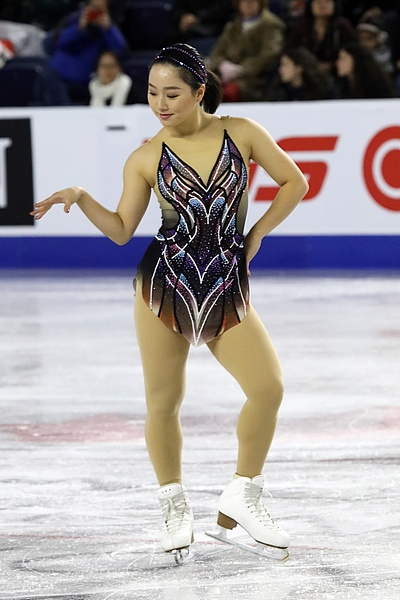
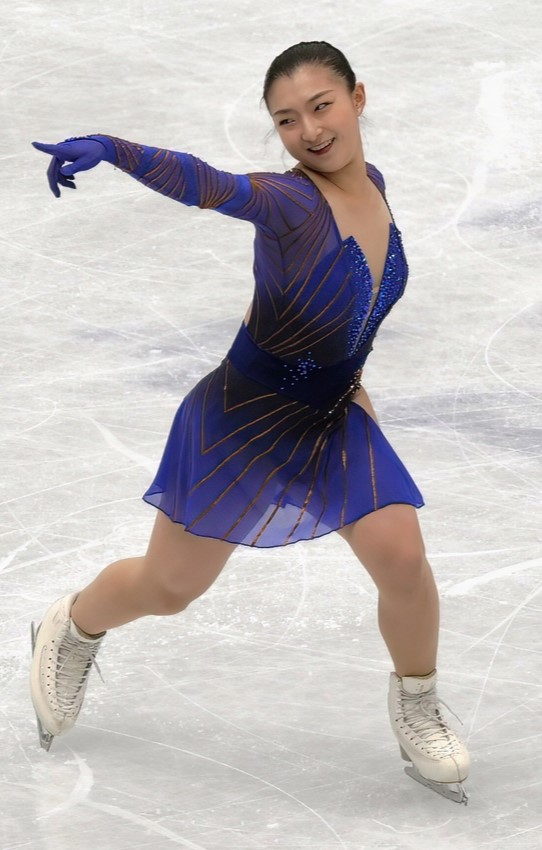
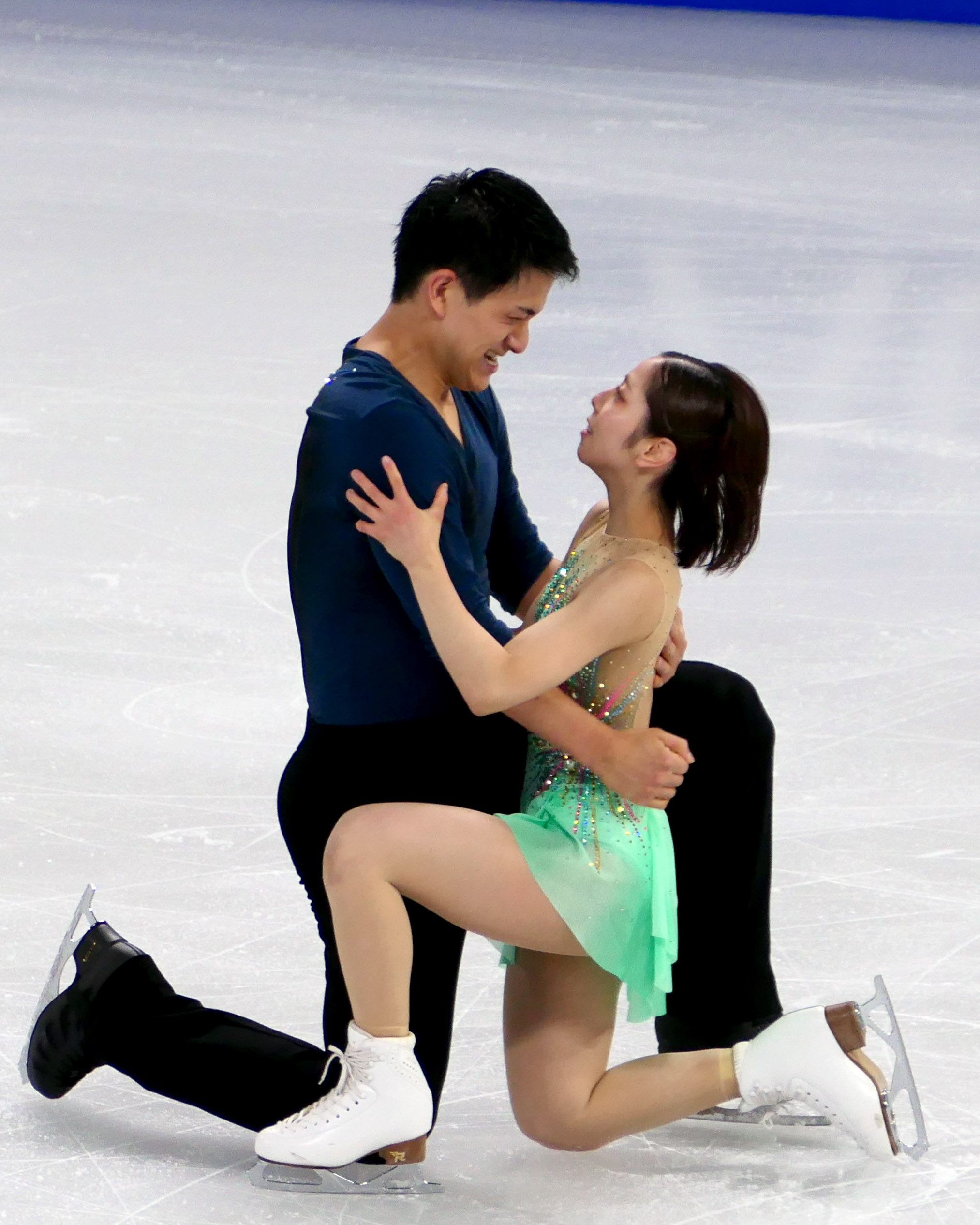
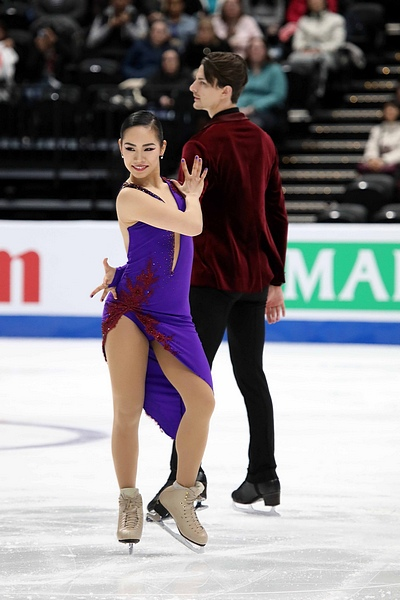
The Japanese figure skating team and silver medalists from the 2022 Winter Olympics (from left to right):
Shoma Uno; Yuma Kagiyama; Wakaba Higuchi; Kaori Sakamoto; Riku Miura and Ryuichi Kihara; and Misato Komatsubara and Tim Koleto

The inordinate delay in awarding the medals from the team event was distressing for the skaters involved. Zachary Donohue of the United States described the loss felt by members of the American team: missing out on the Olympic medal ceremony, missed financial opportunities that come from being an Olympic medalist, missed sponsorships, and the loss of status from being able to describe oneself as an Olympic medalist.

The Olympics represent something very special. It's a neutral playing field [where athletes] come and in front of the world, declare their hard work and their dedication and their determination and grit and their integrity of who they are as athletes. The decision being postponed for so long really detracts from the integrity of the Olympic image and the Olympic values. And I think it takes a lot away from the integrity that the majority of athletes choose, in the choices they make on an everyday basis of how they train, how they fuel, how they recover. So [the] conversation was a lot more than just one medal ceremony at stake here. [It's about] the way the world views the sport and the way the world views, specifically, figure skating. And that's something that is really in jeopardy.

— Zachary Donohue

Vincent Zhou of the United States described the situation thusly: "It felt like a sting on the history of figure skating and the Olympics. It reflects poorly on the integrity of sport in the Olympics in general. There's been a shocking lack of transparency and communication, not just to the public, but to the athletes themselves." On the one-year anniversary of the 2022 Winter Olympic opening ceremony, U.S. Figure Skating posted a picture on social media of the entire U.S. skating team standing in front of the Olympic rings, dressed in their team uniforms and holding empty presentation boxes that should have held medals.

As we approach the one-year anniversary of the 2022 Olympic Winter Games, U.S. Figure Skating and its athletes are deeply frustrated by the lack of a final decision in the Team Event. We're very proud of how our Olympic medalists have carried themselves with poise and dignity since earning medals in Beijing. They have long deserved the recognition that has been withheld due to the ongoing process. U.S. Figure Skating calls for a fair and appropriate ruling to rightfully award medals to all clean sport athletes affected by this situation.

— U.S. Figure Skating

The American and Japanese teams ultimately received their medals at a ceremony which took place on 7 August 2024 at the Jardins du Trocadéro during the 2024 Summer Olympics in Paris. The Russian team was unable to attend the medal ceremony due to the suspension of the Russian Olympic Committee (ROC) and other related logistical issues. According to Sport Express, the Russian skaters filed a complaint with the Court of Arbitration for Sport over not receiving an invitation to the ceremony. In January 2025, Match TV, citing the IOC press service, reported that the bronze medals would be handed over to the ROC when it became logistically possible to do so.

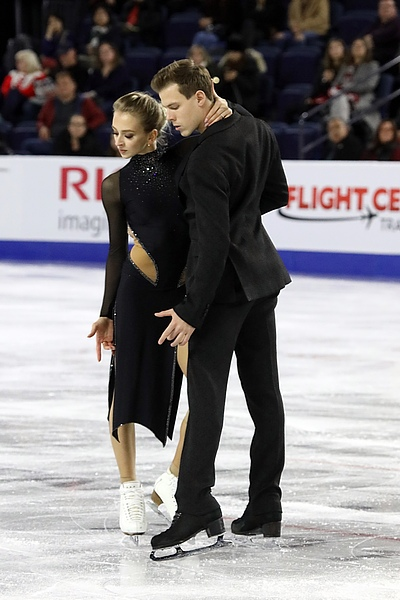
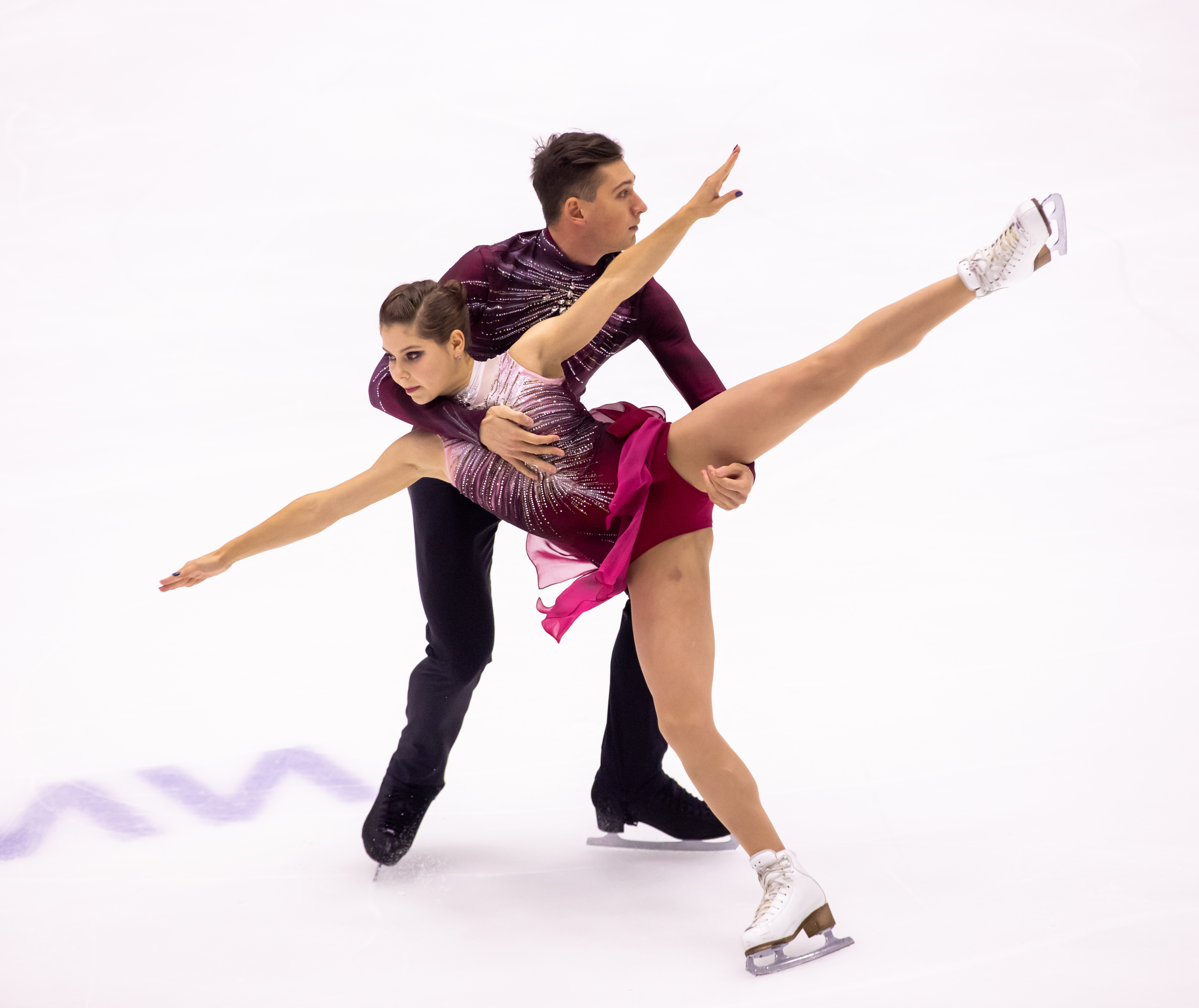
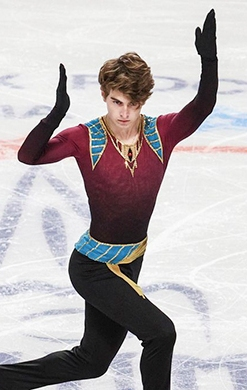
The Russian figure skating team and bronze medalists from the 2022 Winter Olympics (from left to right):
Victoria Sinitsina and Nikita Katsalapov; Anastasia Mishina and Aleksandr Galliamov; and Mark Kondratiuk

== See also ==
- Doping in figure skating

== Works cited ==
- "Special Regulations & Technical Rules – Single & Pair Skating and Ice Dance 2021". International Skating Union. Archived from the original on 4 April 2022.
