= Alexey Popov (journalist) =

Russian journalist and TV commentator (born 1974)

- Born: Alexey Lvovich Popov; 13 July 1974 (age 51); Moscow, RSFSR, Soviet Union
- Occupation: Sports journalist
- Years active: 1991-present

Alexey Lvovich Popov (Russian: Алексей Львович Попов; July 13, 1974 in Moscow) is a Russian journalist and TV commentator best known as a commentator on Formula 1 racing.

== Biography ==
The first Formula 1 race Popov witnessed was in 1988 in Belgium: his grandfather worked there in the Trade Mission of the USSR. (Note: Vladimir Makeev (Russian: Владимир Павлович Макеев; born 1948, Moscow) also transliterated as Vladimir Makeyev, who, in 2006, became a General Director - Chairman of the Board of ITERA Oil and Gas Company LLC, and, since 2013, was a member of the Board of Directors of ITERA, First Vice President of ITERA Group and is a close personal friend of Igor Makarov, who is close to Curt Weldon, and whose wife Nadezhda Ivanovna Makeeva (Russian: Надежда Ивановна Макеева) was once an owner of land for Sosny DNP (Russian: ДНП «Сосны»), was the senior expert of the USSR Trade Mission in Belgium from 1983 to 1985 and from 1985-1991 worked in senior positions in the Ministry of Foreign Trade and the Ministry of Foreign Economic Relations of the USSR and, since 1991, was the Deputy Trade Representative of the Russian Federation in the Republic of Cyprus.) He started his journalist career in 1991 at the age of 17 for the newspaper Sport Express. As he later confessed, he was dissatisfied with quality of Formula 1 coverage in the Soviet media, and he decided to contact Sport Express editors if he could offer any help. To his surprise, he was appointed as an editor himself. Later he wrote several books and many articles, including those for magazines Formula +, Autosport, Grand Prix, F1Life, the newspaper Soviet Sport.

He began race commentary in 1992 on the TV channel Russia 1, then-RTR.

In the same year he became a member of the company Samipa (Monaco), which owned the television rights to broadcast Formula 1 races in the former USSR. Then he moved to Monaco where he did the production of Chrono TV program. At that time, he was commenting CART and NASCAR races on the French TV channel AB Moteurs. Since 1996, he resumed working on Russian television.

Popov was nominated for TEFI award in 2000, but lost it to Vladimir Maslachenko.

In 2005, 2009 and 2011-2012, Popov led channel Russia 2 program Grand Prix with Alexey Popov.

From February 2007 to May 2013 he was the permanent presenter of the Week of sports, led it in turn with Dmitry Guberniev.

From November 2015 to March 2022 he worked for Match TV channel.

Since 2024, he owns a sport bar called Lights Out (Russian: Гаснут Огни) named after his own catch-phrase. During the F1 races, he comments them with his spouse Natalia Fabrichnova for the visitors of his bar but also streams his commentary box over the Internet.

Popov is often called The Russian voice of Formula 1. Alongside Formula One, he has been a commentator of various racing series like GP2/Formula 2, A1 Grand Prix etc.

He speaks many European languages: French, Italian, Spanish, Portuguese, German, English and others, in varying degrees.

While in Formula 1 paddock, he has made friends with many F1 drivers, mostly French-speaking, like Alain Prost, Jean Alesi, and Olivier Panis whom he calls one of his best friends.

Aside from motorsports, Popov also commentates rugby union matches.

== Personal life ==
He has three children from two prior marriages. His first wife is French, and she is the mother of his two sons. In 2023, he married his colleague Natalia Fabrichnova with whom he has been sharing commentary box since 2012.

== Work on Russian television ==
- 1992 — RTR
- 1996 — RTR
- 1997-1999 — TV Centr
- 2000-2002 — RTR
- 2002-2005 — Russia 1 and Sport
- 2006 — REN TV
- 2007-2009 — Russia 2
- 2010-2015 — Russia 2 and Sport-1
- November 1, 2015 – March 2022 — Match TV
