= Yuri Vanyat =

Soviet journalist (1913–1992)

- Born: 7 December 1913; Moscow, Russian Empire
- Died: 3 March 1992 (aged 78); Moscow, Russia
- Occupations: Journalist, Author

Yury (Georgy) Ilyich Vanyat (Russian: Юрий (Гeоргий) Ильич Ваньят) is one of the first and most respected sports journalists of the Soviet Union. The only journalist who covered all 54 Soviet Top League.

== Career ==
Played in the youth team goalkeeper Pishevik (Moscow). He graduated from high school coaches at the Institute of Physical Education. He covered all the Soviet Top League and hockey finals of the USSR Cup. He worked at 8 Olympic hockey tournament and 7 of the World Cup, 28 ice hockey world championships. For almost 40 years, he was a member of various committees of the Football Federation of the USSR, was a member of the National Olympic Committee of the USSR.

In 1933–1949 he worked in the newspaper Red Sports (since 1946 — Soviet Sport). In 1950–1986 — in the newspaper Trud. In 1987–1992 — the newspaper Moskovskaya Pravda.

== Awards ==
- Order of the Badge of Honour (1972)
- Order of Friendship of Peoples
