= Yevgeny Slyusarenko =

Russian sports journalist and manager

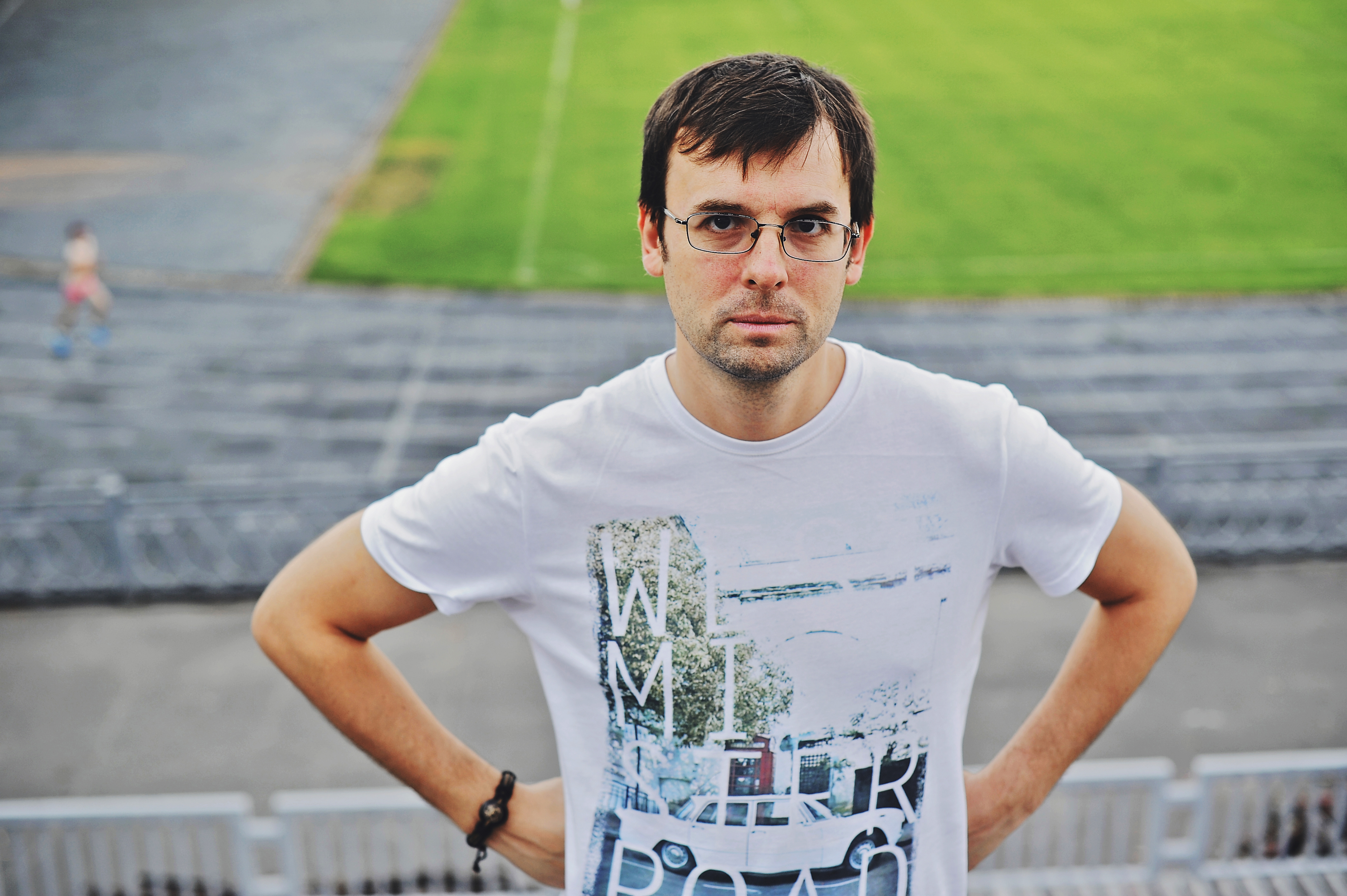
Slyusarenko in 2013

Yevgeny Alexandrovich Slyusarenko (Russian: Евгений Александрович Слюсаренко; born 5 April 1978) is a Russian sports journalist and manager. In 2023, he was appointed a managing director of Sovetsky Sport.

== Biography ==
Slyusarenko graduated from the Faculty of Journalism of Moscow State University and has a degree in philology. He has been working as a sports journalist and has been an accredited journalist to seven Summer and Winter Olympics.

Since 2018, Slyusarenko was the Chief editor of Championat.com, the most visited sports media in Russia at the time. In August 2021 he was replaced by Vyacheslav Opakhin and appointed the department head of the Gazprom-Media. His responsibilities included managing the sports websites owned by the holding, Match.tv and Sportbox.ru. In March 2023, Slyusarenko moved to Sovetsky Sport.
