= List of non-English-language newspapers with English-language subsections =

Following is a list of non-English-language newspapers with English-language subsections.

== Austria ==
- Der Standard (The New York Times International Weekly)

== Bosnia ==
- Dnevni Avaz (The New York Times International Weekly)

== Brazil ==
- Folha de S.Paulo

== Denmark ==
- Børsen
- Jyllands-Posten
- Politiken

== France ==
- Le Monde
- Le Monde diplomatique

== Georgia ==
- 24 Saati (The New York Times International Weekly)

== Germany ==
- Bild
- Der Spiegel
- Süddeutsche Zeitung
- Die Zeit

== Greece ==
- Kathimerini

== Iceland ==
- Morgunblaðið

== Israel ==
- Haaretz
- Israel Hayom
- Yediot Ahronot

== Italy ==
- Corriere della Sera
- La Gazzetta dello Sport
- La Repubblica (The New York Times International Weekly)

== Japan ==
- Asahi Shimbun
- Daily Yomiuri
- Mainichi Shimbun
- Nihon Keizai Shimbun

== Korea (South) ==
- Hankyoreh
- Joongang Daily
- Kyunghyang Shinmun
- Yonhap News

== Lebanon ==
- Al Akhbar

== Mexico ==
- El Universal

== Netherlands ==
- Trouw

== Romania ==
- România Liberă (The New York Times International Weekly)

== Russia ==
- Sport Express

== Serbia ==
- Blic

== Slovenia ==
- Delo (The New York Times International Weekly)

== Spain ==
- Ara
- El País
- Vilaweb

== Sweden ==
- The Local

== Taiwan ==
- The United Daily News (The New York Times International Weekly)

== Turkey ==
- Hürriyet (Hurriyet Daily News)
- Sabah (Daily Sabah News)

== Ukraine ==
- Ukrainska Pravda

== Venezuela ==
- El Universal

== See also ==
- Lists of newspapers
