= Sport Express =

Russian daily sports newspaper

Russian: Спорт-Экспресс
- Founder: Vladimir Kuchmiy
- Editor: Maxim Maximov
- Founded: August 14, 1991; 34 years ago
- Language: Russian
- Headquarters: Moscow, Russia
- OCLC number: 723731182
- Website: www.sport-express.ru

Sport-Express (Russian: Спорт-Экспресс) is a Russian daily sports newspaper founded by Vladimir Kuchmiy. Printed in 31 cities of Russia, Latvia, Belarus, Ukraine, Kazakhstan and the United States, it is the biggest-selling sports newspaper in Russia, with the daily audience of over 700,000 people.

Sport-Express was founded in 1991. It is a part of the European Sports Media.

== Notable journalists ==
- Vsevolod Kukushkin, ice hockey and sports correspondent (22 years)
- Elena Vaytsekhovskaya, sports correspondent (26 years)
- Aksel Vartanyan, sports historian
- Vladimir Kuchmiy, founder and chief editor (18 years)
- Igor Rabiner, football reviewer and sports correspondent (1994–2012, since 2014)
- Alexey Popov, Formula One correspondent
- Rovshan Askerov, columnist

== See also ==
- List of non-English newspapers with English language subsections
- Sovetsky Sport
