= Igor Rabiner =

Russian journalist and writer (born 1973)

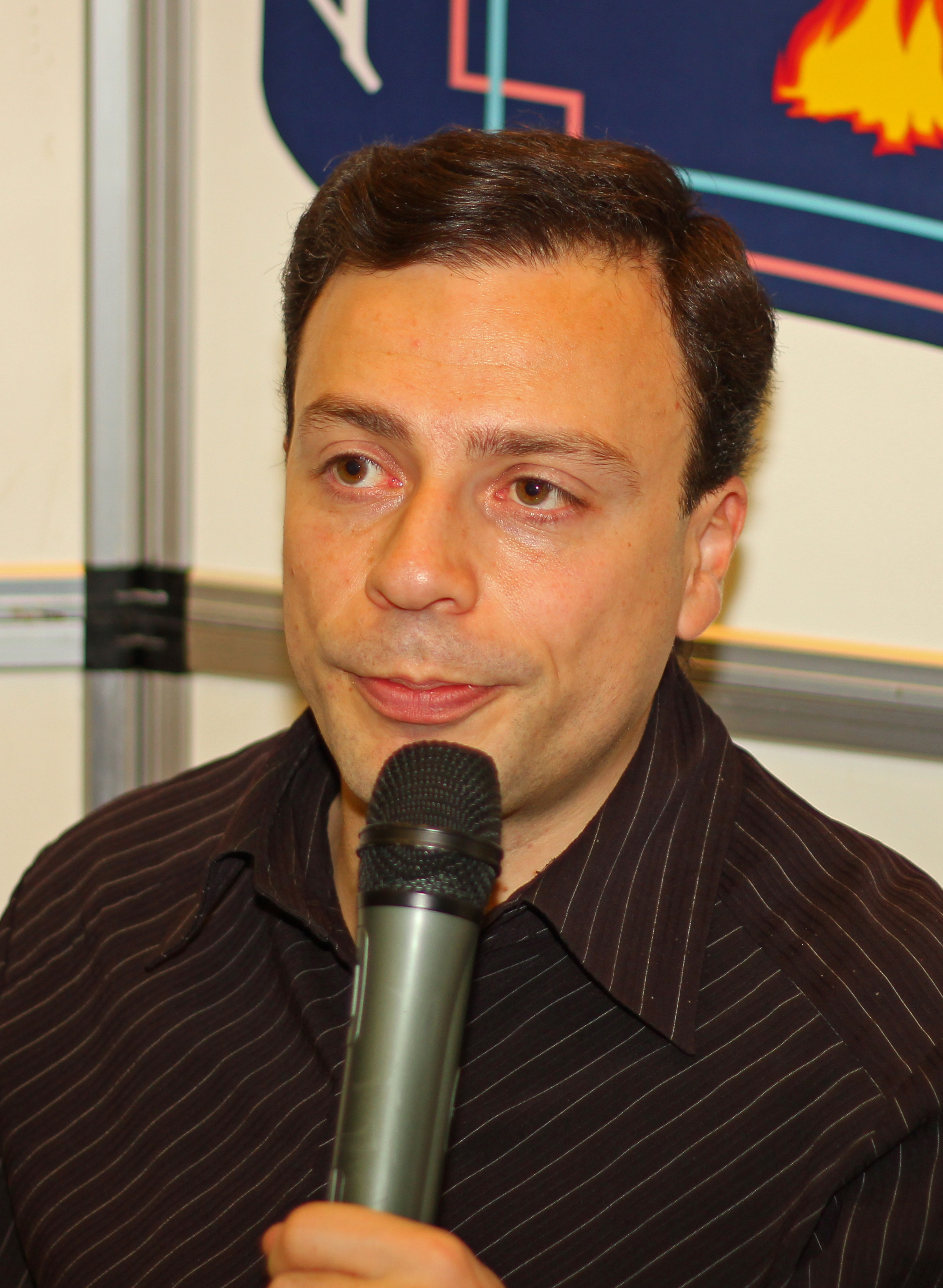
Igor Rabiner

Igor Yakovlevich Rabiner (Russian: Игорь Яковлевич Рабинер; born 13 February 1973 in Moscow) is a Russian football journalist and writer known for his work with Sport-Express and his books, most notably his controversial bestseller How Spartak Was Being Killed (Russian: Как убивали «Спартак»), where he describes the crisis FC Spartak Moscow faced in the early 2000s, at the end of Oleg Romantsev's reign and immediately after it. Later, that book was followed by its sequel, How Spartak Was Being Killed 2 about the later events, and Lokomotiv We Have Lost («Локомотив», который мы потеряли) that exploits similar themes regarding another popular Russian football team, Lokomotiv Moscow. In 2012, after being sacked by Sport-Express he moved to the Championat.com sports portal.

In April 2022, Rabiner was named one of the 50 most important people in the history of Spartak Moscow, of which he is a fan.

== Bibliography ==
- Football. Farewell to the Century (Футбол. Прощание с веком), 2001, Terra-Sport, ISBN 5-93127-115-5
- How Spartak Was Being Killed (Как убивали «Спартак»), 2006, Trade Secret, ISBN 5-98888-027-4
- How Spartak Was Being Killed 2 (Как убивали «Спартак» 2), 2007, OLMA Media Group, ISBN 978-5-373-01885-2
- Lokomotiv We Have Lost («Локомотив», который мы потеряли), 2008, OLMA Media Group. ISBN 978-5-373-02177-7
- Our Football Russia (Наша футбольная Russia). — 2008, OLMA Media Group. ISBN 978-5-373-02216-3
- Mysteries of Olympic Gold. Isinbaeva, Dementieva and others (Тайны олимпийского золота. Исинбаева, Дементьева и другие). — 2008, OLMA Media Group. ISBN 978-5-373-02286-6
- EURO 2008. The Bronze Dream of Russia (Euro-2008. Бронзовая сказка России). — 2008, OLMA Media Group. ISBN 978-5-373-02246-0
- The Truth About Zenit (Правда о «Зените»). — 2009, OLMA Media Group. ISBN 978-5-373-02649-9
- Hockey Madness: From Nagano To Vancouver (Хоккейное безумие: от Нагано до Ванкувера). — 2009, OLMA Media Group. ISBN 978-5-373-03339-8
- The Scandal Echo of Maribor (Скандальное эхо Марибора). – 2010, OLМA Media Group. ISBN 978-5-373-03354-1
- Life Of Remarkable Coaches (Жизнь замечательных тренеров). – 2010, OLMA Media Group. ISBN 978-5-373-03703-7
- Spartak Confessions (Спартаковские исповеди). – 2011, OLMA Media Group. ISBN 978-5-373-04047-1
- How Did Russia Get 2018 World Cup, Sports & Political Investigation (Как Россия получила чемпионат мира по футболу – 2018. Спортивно-политическое расследование). – 2012, Astrel. ISBN 978-5-271-38553-7
- Dick Advokaat & Guus Hiddink: Unbelievable Adventures of the Dutchmen in Russia (Дик Адвокат и Гус Хиддинк: невероятные приключения голландцев в России). – 2012, Astrel. ISBN 978-5-271-42533-2
