= Vladimir Kuchmiy =

Russian newspaper editor (1948–2009)

Kuchmiy in 2010

Vladimir Mikhailovich Kuchmiy (Russian: Владимир Михайлович Кучмий; May 31, 1948 – 21 March 2009) was a Russian newspaper editor. He was the founder and chief editor (from 1991 to 2009) of the Russian newspaper Sport Express.

== Biography ==
In August 1991, Kuchmiy (together with some reporters from then-USSR Sovetsky Sport newspaper) founded Sport Express as the first professional sports daily newspaper in Russia. He became the chief editor of the publication and kept this position until his death, largely influencing the editorial policy but deliberately restraining himself from contributing to the newspaper. The circulation of the newspaper rose to 700,000 during Kuchmiy's editorship.

Kuchmiy died on 21 March 2009, aged 60.
