= Sofiia Holichenko =

Ukrainian pair skater

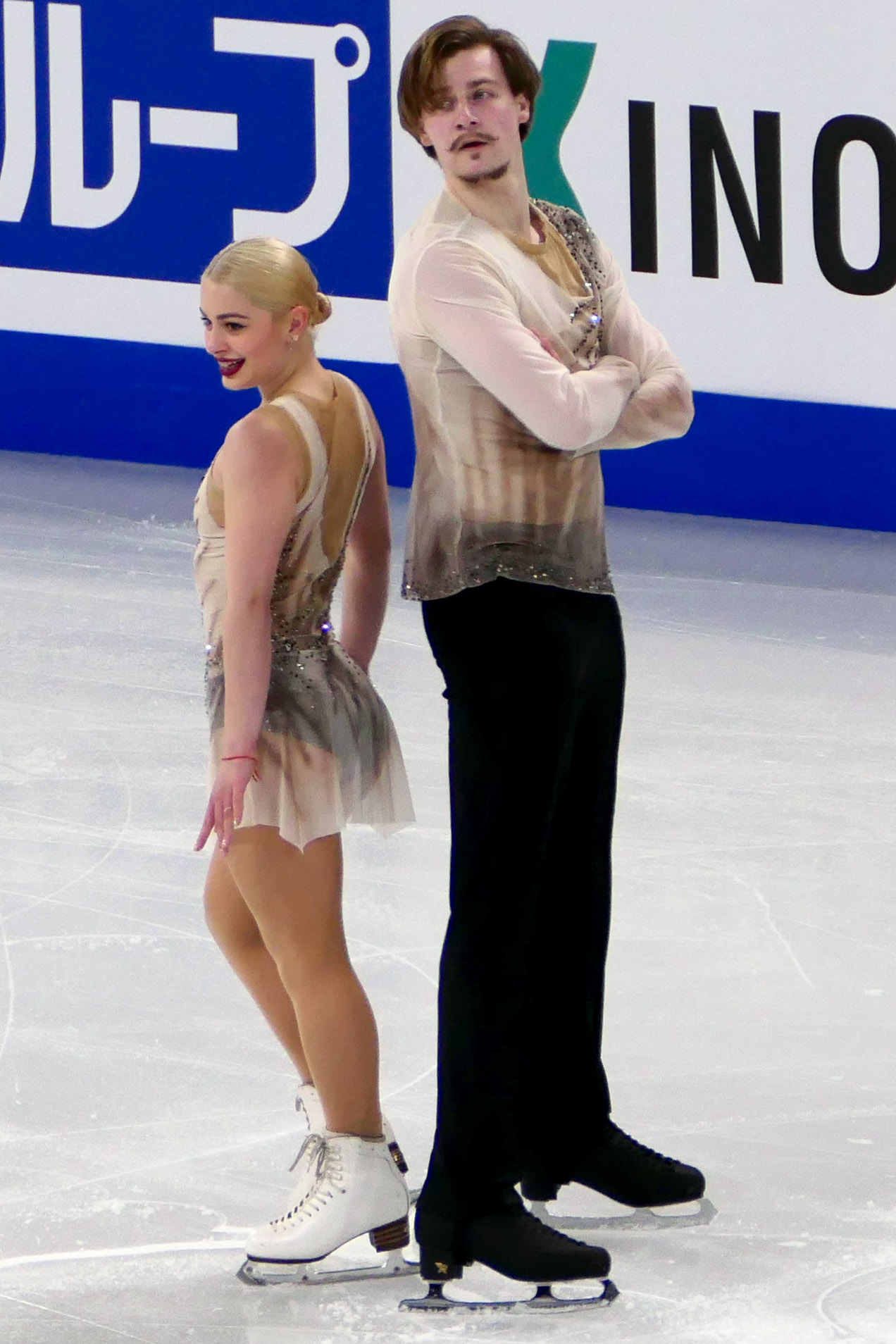
- Sofiia Holichenko and Artem Darenskyi at the 2024 World Championships

Personal information
- Native name: Софія Юріївна Голіченко (Ukrainian)
- Full name: Sofiia Yuriyivna Holichenko
- Other names: Sofia/Sofiya Golichenko
- Born: 23 November 2004 (age 21) Kyiv, Ukraine
- Home town: Dnipro, Ukraine
- Height: 1.56 m (5 ft 1 in)

Figure skating career
- Country: Ukraine
- Discipline: Pair skating
- Partner: Artem Darenskyi (since 2020); Ivan Pavlov (2018–19)
- Coach: Ihor Marchenko
- Skating club: MDUSH of Winter Sport, Dnipro
- Began skating: 2007

Medal record
Ukrainian Championships
Gold medal – first place	2022 Kyiv	Pairs
Gold medal – first place	2023 Bohuslav	Pairs
Gold medal – first place	2024 Bohuslav	Pairs
Silver medal – second place	2021 Kyiv	Pairs
Bronze medal – third place	2019 Kyiv	Pairs
World Junior Championships
Silver medal – second place	2025 Debrecen	Pairs

Sofiia Yuriyivna Holichenko (Ukrainian: Софія Юріївна Голіченко; born 23 November 2004) is a Ukrainian pair skater. With her skating partner, Artem Darenskyi, she is the 2025 World Junior silver medalist, a three-time Ukrainian national champion (2022–24), and the 2023 CS Golden Spin of Zagreb bronze medalist.

== Career ==
=== Early career ===
As a singles skater, Holichenko most notably won the bronze medal at the 2018 Ukrainian junior championships. She competed a single season in pairs with Ivan Pavlov, winning a bronze medal at the senior Ukrainian championships.

=== 2020–21 season: Debut of Holichenko/Darenskyi ===
In June, it was announced that she had formed a new partnership with Artem Darenskyi.

After obtaining the required minimum technical elements scores, Holichenko/Darenskyi were nominated to represent Ukraine at the 2021 World Championships in Stockholm. They withdrew a few days before the start of the competition, having tested positive for coronavirus.

=== 2021–22 season: Beijing Olympics ===
Holichenko/Darenskyi began the season at the 2021 CS Nebelhorn Trophy, attempting to qualify a berth for Ukraine at the 2022 Winter Olympics. They placed eleventh at the event, outside the qualifications. However, Ukraine qualified to the Olympic team event due to Anastasiia Shabotova qualifying to the women's competition at Nebelhorn, allowing for a Ukrainian pair to be sent for that. Holichenko/Darenskyi went on to finish fifth at the Budapest Trophy.

After winning their first Ukrainian national title, Holichenko/Darenskyi placed fifteenth at the 2022 European Championships in Tallinn. Days later, they were named to the Ukrainian Olympic team. They finished ninth among nine pairs entered in the short program of the Olympic team event. This was their only performance at the Games, as Team Ukraine did not advance to the second stage of the competition and finished tenth.

The team returned home to Dnipro after the Olympics and immediately found themselves in the midst of the Russian invasion of Ukraine. They enlisted Canadian music editor Hugo Chouinard to change their short program music in advance of the 2022 World Championships in Montpellier, hoping to inspire the country with Ukrainian music. They undertook a six-day journey to France, via Romania, Italy, and Poland, with Darenskyi saying that their goal was "to show that Ukrainian athletes are fighting for their country." On arrival, they received a standing ovation and placed thirteenth in the short program with very limited training. In light of this, they opted not to compete in the free skate. They temporarily left home to live and train in Toruń for the foreseeable future.

=== 2022–23 season ===
Prior to the season beginning, it was announced that Holichenko/Darenskyi had left Toruń and returned to Dnipro to train.

Holichenko/Darenskyi's lone competitive appearance for the season came at the 2022 CS Nebelhorn Trophy, where they finished in twelfth place. They missed the rest of the season due to injury and only returned to compete at the 2023 Ukrainian Championships in April, which they won.

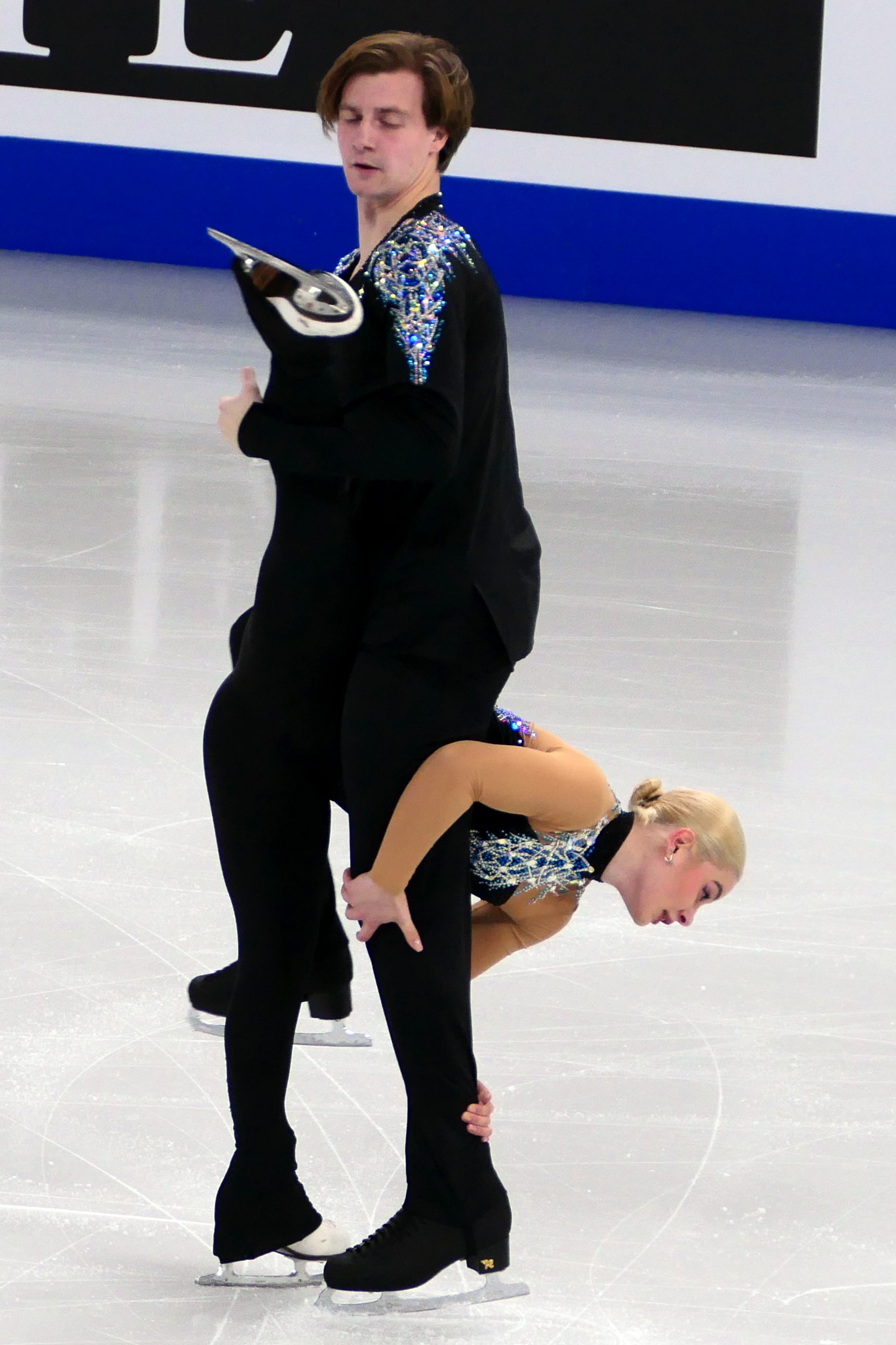
Holichenko and Darenskyi performing a pair spin during their free skate at the 2024 World Championships

=== 2023–24 season: Challenger Series bronze ===
In August 2023, it was announced that Holichenko/Darenskyi had switched coaches from Lilia Batutina to Ihor Marchenko.

Starting the season at the 2023 CS Nebelhorn Trophy, Holichenko/Darenskyi came in eighth place. At the 2023 CS Golden Spin of Zagreb, Holichenko/Darenskyi placed third in the short program and third in the free skate, placing third overall and earning their first ISU Challenger Series medal.

In the second half of the season, Holichenko/Darenskyi came eleventh at the 2024 European Championships and seventeenth at the 2024 World Championships.

=== 2024–25 season ===
Due to the constant shelling taking place in Ukraine as a result of the ongoing war, Holichenko and Darenskyi had limited access to ice rinks where they could train in throughout the off-season. Their first competition of the season was on the 2024–25 ISU Junior Grand Prix circuit at the 2024 JGP Poland, where they won the silver medal.

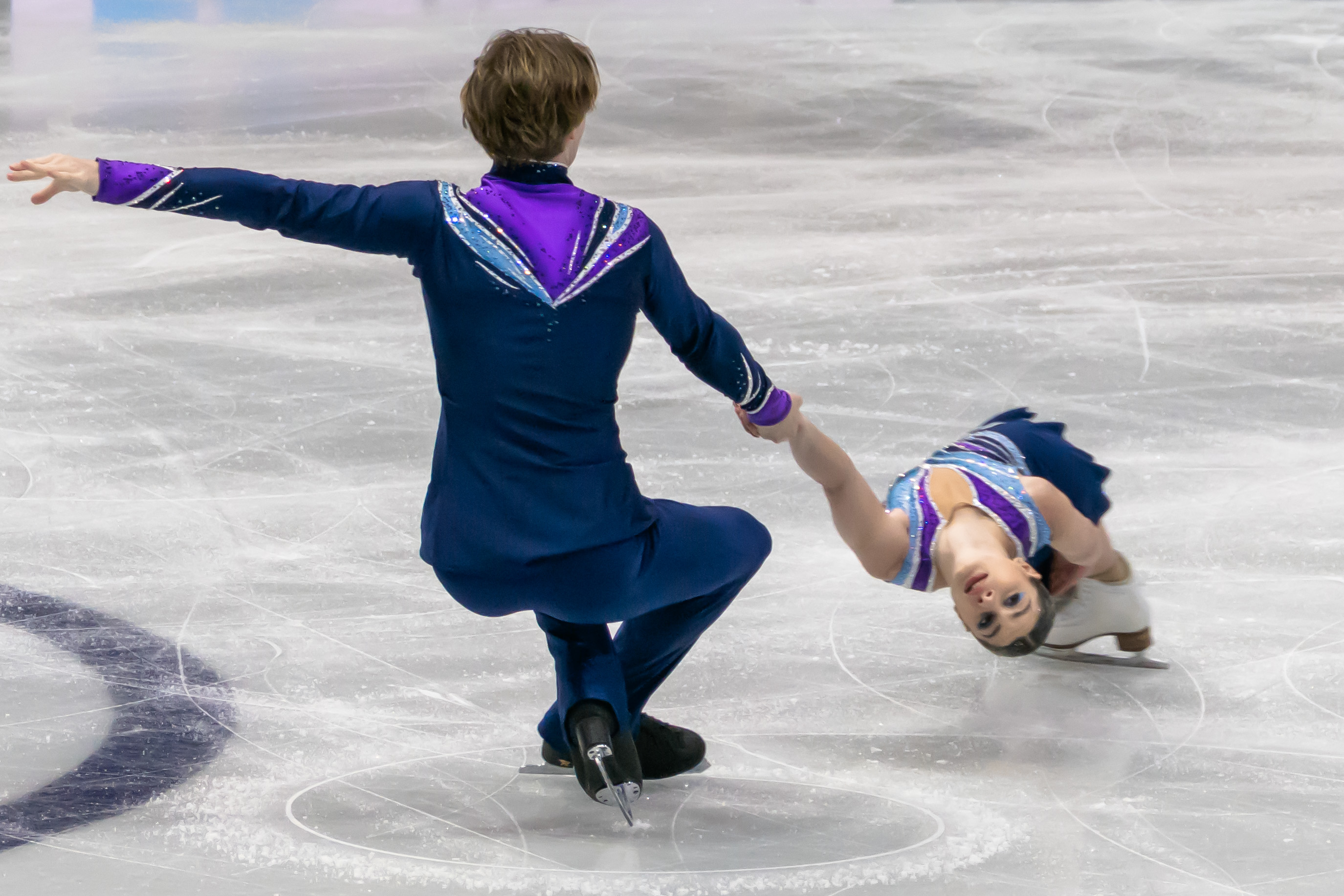
Holichenko and Darenskyi performing a death spiral during their free skate at the 2025 World Championships

Returning to the senior level, Holichenko/Darenskyi placed seventh at the 2024 CS Warsaw Cup. The pair then went on to compete at the 2025 European Championships in Tallinn, Estonia, where they placed eleventh. They subsequently won the bronze medal at the Road to 26 Trophy in Milan, Italy, a test event for the 2026 Winter Olympics.

They then represented Ukraine at the 2025 World Junior Championships, winning the silver medal. The team attributed their attendance at the junior championship to a desire to secure berths for Ukrainian pairs on the following season's junior circuit. “Well, we’re glad that we won this medal, but it was not our main target,” Darenskyi said. “Our main target was to secure the spots for Ukraine and the World Championships in Boston, where we hope to qualify. We hoped for the triple flip to work here, but maybe in Boston it will work.”

They closed the season by competing at the 2025 World Championships in Boston, Massachusetts, United States, where they finished in seventeenth place overall.

In April, Holichenko/Darenskyi's training rink in Kherson was destroyed by a Russian missile. Three people were injured and one person was killed from the impact.

=== 2025–26 season ===
Holichenko/Darenskyi opened their season with a sixth-place finish at the 2025 Lombardia Trophy. They then went on to finish fifth at the ISU Skate to Milano and twelfth at the 2025 CS Golden Spin of Zagreb.

Going into the 2026 European Championships, Holichenko/Darenskyi each dealt with injuries and losing their luggage at the airport upon arriving. Despite this, the pair still opted to compete at the event, finishing in sixteenth place.

== Programs ==
=== Pair skating with Artem Darenskyi ===
Season	Short program	Free skating
2025–26	Sweet Dreams (Are Made of This) by Eurythmics & Annie Lennox choreo. by Nadezhda Yavir	Mad World by Tears for Fears performed by 2WEI, Tommee Profitt, & Fleurie choreo. by Nadezhda Yavir
2024–25	Hit the Road Jack by Percy Mayfield performed by 2WEI & Bri Bryant choreo. by Nadezhda Yavir	Cosmic Love by Florence and the Machine choreo. by Nadezhda Yavir
2023–24	Hit the Road Jack by Percy Mayfield performed by 2WEI & Bri Bryant choreo. by Nadezhda Yavir	Smells Like Teen Spirit by Nirvana performed by Malia J choreo. by Nadezhda Yavir
2022–23	Zhiva (Alive) by Hardkiss choreo. by Ivan Lytvynenko	Smells Like Teen Spirit by Nirvana performed by Malia J; The Muse's Dance by Jo Blankenburg; Rise of the Phoenix by Jennifer Thomas; Macabracadabra by Jo Blankenburg choreo. by Ivan Lytvynenko
2021–22	Zhiva (Alive) by Hardkiss choreo. by Ivan Lytvynenko; Pina; Glasshouse; Lilies of the Valley (from Pina) by Thomas Hanreich, Jun Miyake choreo. by Ivan Lytvynenko	Men in Black 3 by Danny Elfman choreo. by Ivan Lytvynenko
2020–21	Nuvole Bianche by Ludovico Einaudi choreo. by Ivan Lytvynenko	Men in Black 3 by Danny Elfman choreo. by Ivan Lytvynenko

== Competitive highlights ==
- JGP – Event of the ISU Junior Grand Prix Series
- CS – Event of the ISU Challenger Series
- TBD – Assigned
- WD – Withdrew from competition

=== Pair skating with Artem Darenskyi ===
Competition placements at senior level
Season	2020–21	2021–22	2022–23	2023–24	2024–25	2025–26	2026–27
Winter Olympics (Team event)		10th					
World Championships		WD		17th	17th	18th	
European Championships		15th		11th	11th	16th	
Ukrainian Championships	2nd	1st	1st	1st			
GP Skate America							7th
GP Skate Canada							6th
CS Nebelhorn Trophy		11th	12th	8th			
CS Warsaw Cup					7th		
CS Trialeti Trophy							6th
CS Denis Ten Memorial		6th					
CS Lombardia Trophy						6th	
CS Golden Spin of Zagreb				3rd		12th	
Skate to Milano						5th	
Budapest Trophy		5th					
Road to 26 Trophy					3rd		

Competition placements at junior level
Season	2024–25
World Junior Championships	2nd
JGP Poland	2nd

=== Pair skating with Ivan Pavlov ===
Competition placements at senior level
Season	2018–19
Ukrainian Championships	3rd
Ice Star	6th
Volvo Open Cup	3rd

=== Single skating ===
Competition placements at junior level
Season	2018–19
Ukrainian Championships	3rd
Ice Star	15th

== Detailed results ==
=== Pair skating with Artem Darenskyi ===
ISU personal best scores in the +5/-5 GOE System
Segment	Type	Score	Event
Total	TSS	169.41	2025 Skate to Milano
Short program	TSS	59.34	2024 World Championships
Short program	TES	33.64	2024 World Championships
Short program	PCS	25.70	2024 World Championships
Free skating	TSS	112.24	2025 Skate to Milano
Free skating	TES	59.50	2025 World Championships
Free skating	PCS	55.33	2025 European Championships

==== Senior level ====
Results in the 2020–21 season
Date	Event	SP		FS		Total	
Date	Event	P	Score	P	Score	P	Score
Feb 23–24, 2021	(Ukraine) 2024 Ukrainian Championships	2	48.39	2	88.51	2	136.90

Results in the 2021–22 season
Date	Event	SP		FS		Total	
Date	Event	P	Score	P	Score	P	Score
Sep 21–25, 2021	(Germany) 2021 CS Nebelhorn Trophy	10	52.63	10	89.75	11	142.38
Oct 14–17, 2021	(Hungary) 2021 Budapest Trophy	4	51.99	5	95.65	5	147.64
Oct 27–31, 2021	(Kazakhstan) 2021 CS Denis Ten Memorial Challenge	7	55.89	6	106.28	6	162.17
Dec 7–8, 2021	(Ukraine) 2022 Ukrainian Championships	1	49.58	1	92.45	1	142.03
Jan 10–16, 2022	(Estonia) 2022 European Championships	14	55.15	15	92.46	15	147.61
Feb 4–7, 2022	(China) 2022 Winter Olympics (Team event)	9	53.65	—N/a	—N/a	10	—N/a
Mar 21–27, 2022	(France) 2022 World Championships	13	44.95	—N/a	—N/a	–	WD

Results in the 2022–23 season
Date	Event	SP		FS		Total	
Date	Event	P	Score	P	Score	P	Score
Sep 21–24, 2022	(Germany) 2022 CS Nebelhorn Trophy	12	44.07	12	80.79	12	124.86
Apr 5–7, 2023	(Ukraine) 2023 Ukrainian Championships	1	—N/a	1	—N/a	1	—N/a

Results in the 2023–24 season
Date	Event	SP		FS		Total	
Date	Event	P	Score	P	Score	P	Score
Sep 20–23, 2023	(Germany) 2023 CS Nebelhorn Trophy	8	50.71	8	105.77	8	156.48
Dec 6–9, 2023	(Croatia) 2023 CS Golden Spin of Zagreb	3	55.92	3	106.25	3	162.17
Jan 8–14, 2024	(Lithuania) 2024 European Championships	12	52.95	10	101.42	11	154.37
Mar 18–24, 2024	(Canada) 2024 World Championships	16	59.34	18	100.05	17	159.39
Apr 4–6, 2024	(Ukraine) 2024 Ukrainian Championships	1	—N/a	1	—N/a	1	—N/a

Results in the 2024–25 season
Date	Event	SP		FS		Total	
Date	Event	P	Score	P	Score	P	Score
Nov 20–24, 2024	(Poland) 2024 CS Warsaw Cup	5	54.45	7	96.82	7	151.27
Jan 28 – Feb 2, 2025	(Estonia) 2025 European Championships	10	56.73	11	108.22	11	164.95
Feb 18–20, 2025	(Italy) Road to 26 Trophy	3	56.84	3	107.21	3	164.05
Mar 25–30, 2025	(United States) 2025 World Championships	17	57.20	17	111.35	17	168.55

Results in the 2025–26 season
Date	Event	SP		FS		Total	
Date	Event	P	Score	P	Score	P	Score
Sep 11–14, 2025	(Italy) 2025 Lombardia Trophy	6	44.88	5	90.89	6	135.77
Sep 18–21, 2025	(China) 2025 ISU Skate to Milano	6	57.17	4	112.24	5	169.41
Dec 3–6, 2025	(Croatia) 2025 CS Golden Spin of Zagreb	13	48.20	11	99.80	12	148.00
Jan 13–18, 2026	(United Kingdom) 2026 European Championships	16	42.32	16	84.46	16	126.78
Mar 24–29, 2026	(Czech Republic) 2026 World Championships	17	58.85	16	109.43	18	168.28

Results in the 2026–27 season
Date	Event	SP		FS		Total	
Date	Event	P	Score	P	Score	P	Score
Oct 1-4, 2026	(Georgia (country)) 2026 CS Trialeti Trophy	6	54.32	6	103.87	6	158.19
Oct 30 - Nov 1, 2026	2026 Skate Canada International	6	58.34	5	102.39	6	160.73
Nov 13-15, 2026	(United States) 2026 Skate America	7	58.54	7	99.24	7	157.78

==== Junior level ====
Results in the 2024–25 season
Date	Event	SP		FS		Total	
Date	Event	P	Score	P	Score	P	Score
Sep 25–28, 2024	2024 JGP Poland	2	51.81	5	84.77	2	136.58
Feb 25 – Mar 2, 2025	(Hungary) 2025 World Junior Championships	2	57.40	2	106.66	2	164.06
