= Sovetsky Sport =

Daily Russian newspaper

Russian: Советский спорт
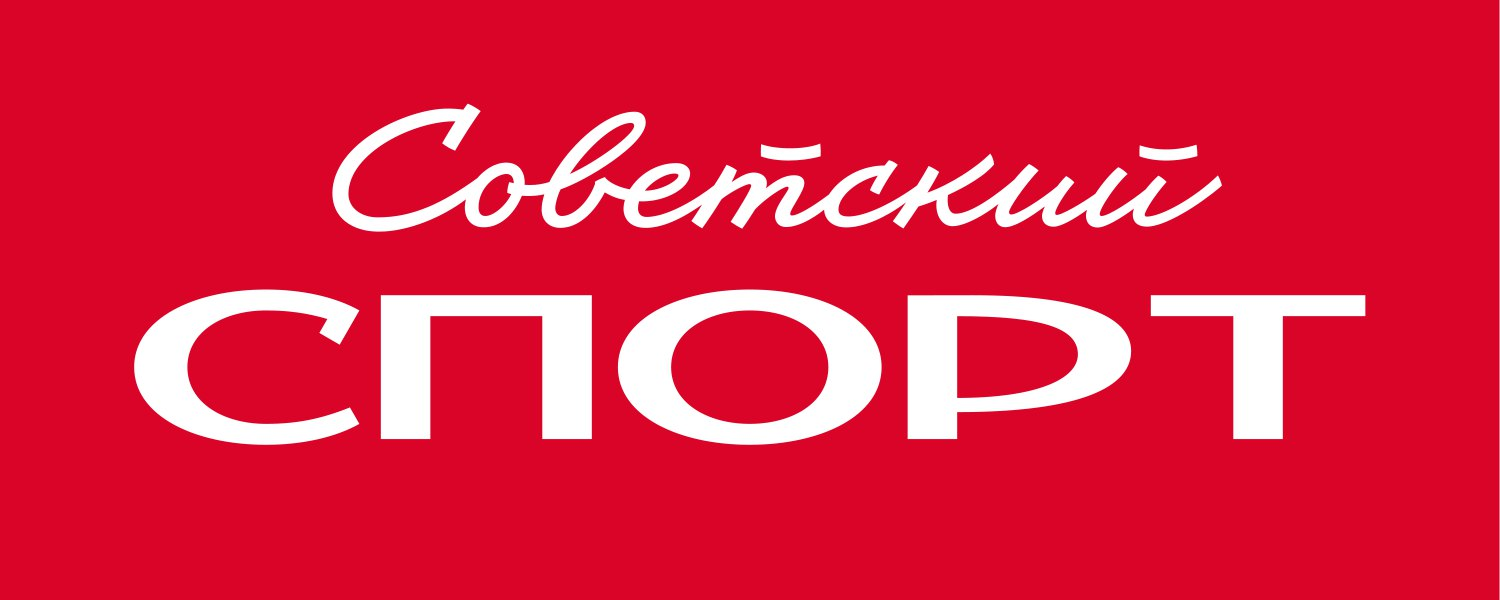
- Editor-in-chief: Yevgeny Slyusarenko (from March 2026)
- Founded: 20 July 1924; 102 years ago
- Language: Russian
- Headquarters: Moscow, Russia
- Website: SovSport.Ru

Sovetsky Sport (Russian: Советский спорт, romanized: Sovetskiy sport; English: Soviet Sports) is a Russian national daily sports newspaper. Until 19 March 1946 the newspaper was called Red Sports (Russian: Красный спорт), it was not printed between 1928 and 1932.

== History ==
Founded on July 20, 1924, in Moscow, it was the first sports newspaper of the USSR, an official organ of the USSR State Committee for Physical Culture and Sports and All-Union Central Council of Trade Unions. One of the major state-run Soviet newspapers, in 1975 Soviet Sports was distributed in 104 countries and had a circulation of 3,900,000 (which increased to more than 5,000,000 in 1988). Having the nominal price of three kopeks, it was accessible to everyone in the country.

Soviet Sports provided daily coverage of major competitions in the USSR and abroad, of activities within national and international sports federations, published interviews with athletes, coaches and other sportspeople, and propagated a healthy lifestyle. It also organized traditional All-Union and international ice hockey, athletics, volleyball, swimming, skiing and other tournaments. The newspaper was awarded the Order of the Red Banner of Labour in 1974.

After the breakup of the USSR, Soviet Sports has been published by the Russian Olympic Committee and Soviet Sports Publishing House. Since 2001 it has been printed in colour. In recent years the newspaper has shifted away from printed editions to publishing on its official website.

== Notable journalists ==
- Yuri Vanyat (1913–1992)
- Aron Itin (1st editor of Red Sports; shot in 1938)
- Semyon Belits-Geiman (born 1945)
- Vladimir Kuchmiy (1948–2009)
- Elena Vaytsekhovskaya (born 1958)
- Vitaly Slavin (born 1960)
- Vasily Utkin (1974-2024)
- Alexey Andronov (born 1975)
- Yevgeny Slyusarenko (born 1978)
- Sofya Tartakova (born 1989)
