= 2021 World Figure Skating Championships =

- Type: ISU Championship
- Date: 22 – 28 March 2021
- Season: 2020–21
- Location: Stockholm, Sweden
- Host: Skate Sweden
- Venue: Ericsson Globe

Champions
- Men's singles: (United States) Nathan Chen
- Women's singles: FSR Anna Shcherbakova
- Pairs: FSR Anastasia Mishina and Aleksandr Galliamov
- Ice dance: FSR Victoria Sinitsina and Nikita Katsalapov
- Previous: 2019 World Championships
- Next: 2022 World Championships

The 2021 World Figure Skating Championships were held from 22 to 28 March 2021, at the Ericsson Globe in Stockholm, Sweden. Sanctioned by the International Skating Union (ISU), the World Championships are considered the most prestigious event in figure skating. Medals were awarded in men's singles, women's singles, pair skating, and ice dance. The competition determined the entry quotas for each skating federation at the 2022 World Championships and was the first qualifying event for the 2022 Winter Olympics.

The World Championships were the only ISU Championship event held during the 2020–21 season, while the European Championships, Four Continents Championships, and World Junior Championships were all cancelled due to the COVID-19 pandemic. The event was held without spectators, while attendees at the competition remained in a bubble – that is, in a cluster made up exclusively of individuals who have been thoroughly tested and were unlikely to spread infection – throughout the event.

Nathan Chen of the United States won the men's event, Anna Shcherbakova of Russia won the women's event, Anastasia Mishina and Aleksandr Galliamov of Russia won the pairs event, and Victoria Sinitsina and Nikita Katsalapov of Russia won the ice dance event. Because of a ruling by the Court of Arbitration for Sport, all Russian skaters competed as representatives of the Figure Skating Federation of Russia (FSR).

== Background ==
The World Figure Skating Championships are considered the most prestigious event in figure skating. The 2021 World Championships were held from 22 to 28 March 2021, at the Ericsson Globe in Stockholm, Sweden. The 2021 World Championships were the only ISU Championship event held during the 2020–21 season owing to the COVID-19 pandemic.

=== Impact of the COVID-19 pandemic ===
The COVID-19 pandemic began with an outbreak in China in December 2019. Soon after, it spread to other areas of Asia and then worldwide in early 2020. The World Health Organization declared the outbreak a public health emergency of international concern on 30 January 2020, and assessed the outbreak as having become a pandemic on 11 March 2020.

COVID‑19 transmission occurs when infectious particles are breathed in or come into contact with the eyes, nose, or mouth. The risk is highest when people are in close proximity, but small airborne particles containing the virus can remain suspended in the air and travel over long distances, particularly indoors. People can remain contagious for up to twenty days and can spread the virus even if they do not develop symptoms themselves. Several COVID-19 vaccines were approved and distributed, many of which initiated mass vaccination campaigns. Other preventive measures included social distancing, quarantining, ventilation of indoor spaces, use of face masks or coverings in public, covering coughs and sneezes, and hand washing. One testing method to see if a person was infected with COVID-19 was real-time reverse transcription polymerase chain reaction (PCR), which was used at the 2021 World Championships.

=== Scheduling ===
The pandemic caused significant disruption to the 2020–21 figure skating season. The complete Junior Grand Prix series was cancelled on 20 July 2020. On 16 October 2020, the International Skating Union (ISU) announced the cancellation of the 2021 Four Continents Figure Skating Championships, and on 24 November 2020, the 2021 World Junior Figure Skating Championships. The 2020–21 Grand Prix of Figure Skating Final, 2021 European Figure Skating Championships, and 2021 World Synchronized Skating Championships were definitively cancelled on 10 December 2020.

Despite these cancellations, ISU Vice President Alexander Lakernik stated that the ISU would make "every effort" to hold the World Championships. A Swedish government ban which limited entrants in international competitions hosted by Sweden to only those from the European Union was lifted on 20 November 2020. However, on 22 December 2020, Skate Sweden cancelled all domestic championships for the remainder of the 2020–21 season in compliance with Public Health Agency of Sweden guidelines.

During its 28 January meeting, the ISU Council affirmed that the World Championships would proceed as scheduled. The council also announced that the status of the World Championships as a qualifying event for the 2022 Winter Olympics would be reevaluated based on the entries received by the ISU as of the 1 March 2021, deadline. On 4 March, the ISU affirmed that the Olympic qualifying process would proceed as previously announced, as nearly all ISU member nations with qualified skaters had confirmed entry to the 2021 World Championships. The 2021 World Figure Skating Championships were ultimately held from 22 to 28 March 2021, at the Ericsson Globe in Stockholm.

=== ISU member nations' responses ===
In November 2020, Skate Canada stated that if the 2021 World Championships continued as planned, it might not participate due to insufficient training time and preparation on behalf of its skaters, as well as the mandatory fourteen-day quarantine upon return to Canada. Despite the cancellation of the 2021 Canadian Championships and a lack of competitive opportunities for its skaters, Skate Canada announced its selection criteria for naming a World Championship team in January 2021.

The Japan Skating Federation withdrew its delegation from the 2021 World Short Track Speed Skating Championships scheduled for early March, calling into question the participation of its figure skaters at the 2021 World Championships. The Japan Skating Federation eventually sent skaters to the World Championships due to it being an Olympic qualifying event. The Japanese delegation arrived at the competition throughout the weekend of 20–22 March, with all athletes receiving a negative PCR test upon arrival.

=== Skaters' responses ===
Skaters arrived at the event with varying levels of preparation due to their respective governments' and home federations' responses to the pandemic. Multiple skaters had been unable to train with their primary coaches due to travel or visa restrictions and spent the season in temporary training situations, either on their own or with different coaches. Many pairs and dance teams were also unable to have physical contact when they could train on the ice due to their nations' respective restrictions, further limiting their preparedness.

In January 2021, Gabriella Papadakis and Guillaume Cizeron of France, the defending world champions in ice dance, announced that they would not compete at the World Championships; they planned to focus instead on the 2022 Winter Olympics. Nathan Chen of the United States, the defending world champion in the men's event, stated that while he was grateful for the opportunity to compete, he had concerns about COVID-19 safety protocols, citing the fourteen-hour flight to Sweden as his biggest concern. Pairs skater Kirsten Moore-Towers of Canada described "anxiousness over the unknown". Some skaters, however, felt that adequate precautions were being taken and they would likely be safe at the event. Emily Bausback of Canada stated: "I knew we wouldn't be going if it wasn't safe... I feel comfortable with the situation." Elizaveta Tuktamysheva of Russia expressed no hesitation about competing at the World Championships, having already had COVID-19.

=== Criticism and concerns ===
During the months preceding the arrival of skaters and officials in Stockholm, a petition calling for the ISU to implement stricter quarantine measures and a tighter bubble, a cluster made up exclusively of individuals who have been thoroughly tested and unlikely to spread infection, garnered thousands of signatures. The Ericsson Globe (the site of the competition arena), two practice arenas, and a dedicated hotel for skaters and officials were interconnected and allowed passage from one place to another via indoor walkways. A negative PCR test was required within forty-eight hours of arrival in Sweden, with a series of follow-up tests scheduled afterward. However, there was no quarantine requirement prior to the start of the competition.

The attendance of skaters representing the Figure Skating Federation of Russia (FSR) drew particular scrutiny, as the federation was accused of holding several domestic and international events in violation of the ISU's COVID-19 safety protocols. Despite some precautionary measures being taken, the organizers of the 2020 Rostelecom Cup, as with other Russian domestic competitions during the season, came under criticism for allowing a large audience and an insufficient enforcement of mandates regarding social distancing or proper use of face masks. A focal point of criticism was the decision to hold the traditional post-competition banquet, where many skaters were documented not wearing masks or socially distancing at all, as well as sharing food from a communal buffet. Additionally, a large number of Russian skaters had contracted COVID-19 during the season, including Elizaveta Tuktamysheva, Victoria Sinitsina, and Nikita Katsalapov. Nevertheless, all members of the Russian delegation tested negative during the initial round of testing administered upon arrival in Stockholm.

=== During the competition ===
Victoria, Crown Princess of Sweden, had been scheduled to participate in the opening ceremony before she and her husband, Prince Daniel, contracted COVID-19 a few weeks prior to the event. She instead appeared in a video message from Haga Palace to welcome the athletes.

Delegations began arriving on 20 and 21 March, and members underwent the required multiple tests and quarantine until a negative result was returned. Attendees were not eligible for accreditation until they passed a second PCR test. After receiving accreditation, limited testing was conducted, and attendees were only required to fill out daily symptom questionnaires and undergo temperature checks.

Attendees at the competition remained in a bubble throughout the event. On 22 March, the ISU announced that one positive case had been found during one of the initial rounds of testing and that contact tracing procedures were being undertaken. The skater with the positive case, later revealed to be Viktoriia Safonova of Belarus, was quarantined and not allowed to compete. Safonova's coach subsequently tested negative in a second round of testing, and Safonova, who had traveled to Stockholm from a different location, had had no contact with the other members of the Belarusian team or their coaches. On 24 March, the ISU announced that a second positive case had been found during the initial round of testing. Without accreditation, neither skater with positive test results had been allowed into the competition bubble.

On 26 March, the ISU announced that a third positive case had been found, this time within the bubble. After the event, Simon Proulx-Sénécal of Armenia revealed that he had tested positive on 25 March, the day before the ice dance competition was scheduled to start, and asked for a re-test prior to the rhythm dance segment on 26 March. As the test result did not come back until after the rhythm dance had concluded, Proulx-Sénécal and his partner, Tina Garabedian, were not allowed to compete. The result came back as a second positive. Proulx-Sénécal expressed that he believed his first test was a false positive, as his federation later received a written test result stating that his second test, taken the morning of the rhythm dance, was negative, not positive as initially conveyed to their team doctor. He subsequently tested negative twice more, once the day after the rhythm dance (27 March) and again upon returning to Montreal on 29 March.

== Qualification ==
Normally, the number of entries from each nation for the 2021 World Championships would have been based on the results of the 2020 World Championships. Since the 2020 World Championships were cancelled, results from the 2019 World Championships were used instead. These nations were eligible to enter more than one skater or team in the indicated disciplines.

Number of entries per discipline
Spots	Men	Women	Pairs	Ice dance
3	Japan; United States	FSR; Japan; Kazakhstan	China; FSR	Canada; FSR; United States
2	China; Czech Republic; FSR; Italy	Canada; South Korea; United States	Austria; Canada; France; Germany; Italy; United States	France; Italy

In 2016, an independent report commissioned by the World Anti-Doping Agency (WADA) confirmed allegations that the Russian Olympic team had been involved in a state-sponsored doping program, active from at least late 2011 through August 2015. On 9 December 2019, the WADA banned Russia from all international competitions after it found that data provided by the Russian Anti-Doping Agency had been manipulated by Russian authorities in order to protect athletes involved in its state-sponsored doping scheme. Under the ban imposed by the Court of Arbitration for Sport, Russian athletes could not use the Russian flag or anthem in international competition and had to present themselves as "Neutral Athletes" or a "Neutral Team" at any world championships until 16 December 2022. Russian skaters competed under a modified flag of the Figure Skating Federation of Russia and the name "FSR" at the 2021 World Championships. The ISU also approved the use of Tchaikovsky's Piano Concerto No. 1 in lieu of the Russian national anthem during medal ceremonies.

== Changes to preliminary entries ==
The International Skating Union published the initial list of entrants on 2 March 2021.

Changes to preliminary entries
Date	Discipline	Withdrew	Added	Reason	Ref.
15 February	Pairs	(Germany); Minerva Fabienne Hase; Nolan Seegert	—N/a	Injury (Hase)	
1 March	Pairs	(United States); Jessica Calalang; Brian Johnson	(United States); Ashley Cain-Gribble; Timothy LeDuc	Personal reasons	
2 March	Men	(Australia); Brendan Kerry	—N/a	Injury	
2 March	Ice dance	(Georgia (country)); Maria Kazakova; Georgy Reviya	—N/a	Injury (Reviya)	
2 March	Ice dance	(Kazakhstan); Maxine Weatherby; Temirlan Yerzhanov	—N/a	—N/a	
8 March	Ice dance	(Spain); Olivia Smart; Adrián Díaz	(Spain); Sara Hurtado; Kirill Khaliavin	Further consideration	
10 March	Ice dance	(South Korea); Yura Min; Daniel Eaton	—N/a	Recovery from injury (Eaton)	
16 March	Women	(Armenia); Anastasiya Galustyan	—N/a	Injury	
20 March	Pairs	(Ukraine); Sofiia Holichenko; Artem Darenskyi	—N/a	Positive COVID-19 test	
21 March	Women	(Philippines); Alisson Perticheto	—N/a	Injury	
22 March	Men	(Armenia); Slavik Hayrapetyan	—N/a	Positive COVID-19 test	
22 March	Women	(Belarus); Viktoriia Safonova	—N/a	Positive COVID-19 test	
22 March	Pairs	(China); Wang Yuchen; Huang Yihang	—N/a	—N/a	

== Required performance elements ==
=== Single skating ===
Women competing in single skating first performed their short programs on Wednesday, 24 March, men performed theirs on Thursday, 25 March. Lasting no more than 2 minutes 40 seconds, the short program had to include the following elements:

For men: one double or triple Axel; one triple or quadruple jump; one jump combination consisting of a double jump and a triple jump, or a quadruple jump and a double jump or triple jump; one flying spin; one camel spin or sit spin with a change of foot; one spin combination with a change of foot; and a step sequence using the full ice surface.

For women: one double or triple Axel; one triple jump; one jump combination consisting of a double jump and a triple jump, or two triple jumps; one flying spin; one layback spin, sideways leaning spin, camel spin, or sit spin without a change of foot; one spin combination with a change of foot; and one step sequence using the full ice surface.

The top 24 skaters after completion of the short program component of the competition moved on to the free skating component. Women performed their free skates on Friday, 26 March; men performed their free skates on Saturday, 27 March. The free skate performance for both men and women could last no more than 4 minutes, and had to include the following: seven jump elements, of which one had to be an Axel-type jump; three spins, of which one had to be a spin combination, one had to be a flying spin, and one had to be a spin with only one position; a step sequence; and a choreographic sequence.

=== Pair skating ===
Couples competing in pair skating performed their short programs on Wednesday, 24 March. Lasting no more than 2 minutes 40 seconds, it had to include the following elements: one pair lift, one twist lift, one double or triple throw jump, one double or triple solo jump, one solo spin combination with a change of foot, one death spiral, and a step sequence using the full ice surface.

The top 20 couples after completion of the short program component moved on to the free skating component, which were performed on Thursday, 25 March. The free skate performance could last no more than 4 minutes, and had to include the following: three pair lifts, of which one had to be a twist lift; two different throw jumps; one solo jump; one jump combination or sequence; one pair spin combination; one death spiral; and a choreographic sequence.

=== Ice dance ===
Couples competing in ice dance performed their rhythm dances on Friday, 26 March. Lasting no more than 2 minutes 50 seconds, the rhythm dance had to include the following elements: the pattern dance, the pattern dance step sequence, one dance lift, one set of sequential twizzles, and one step sequence. The required pattern dance was the Finnstep and music came from musicals or operettas. The Finnstep was developed by Finnish ice dancers Susanna Rahkamo and Petri Kokko as a variation of the quickstep and was ratified by the International Skating Union as a compulsory dance in 2008.

The top 20 couples, after completing the rhythm dance component of the competition moved on to the free dance component, which was held on Saturday, 27 March. The free dance performance could last no longer than 4 minutes, and had to include the following: three dance lifts, one dance spin, one set of synchronized twizzles, one step sequence in hold, one step sequence while on one skate and not touching, and three choreographic elements, of which one had to be a choreographic character step sequence.

== Judging ==
For the 2020–21 season, all of the technical elements in any figure skating performance – such as jumps, spins, and lifts – were assigned a predetermined base point value and were then scored by a panel of nine judges on a scale from −5 to +5 based on their quality of execution. The judging panel's Grade of Execution (GOE) was determined by calculating the trimmed mean (that is, an average after deleting the highest and lowest scores), and this GOE was added to the base value to come up with the final score for each element. The panel's scores for all elements were added together to generate a total element score. At the same time, judges evaluated each performance based on five program components – skating skills, transitions, performance/execution, composition, and interpretation – and assigned a score from .25 to 10 in .25 point increments. The judging panel's final score for each program component was also determined by calculating the trimmed mean. Those scores were then multiplied by the factor shown on the following chart; the results were added together to generate a total program component score.

Program component factoring
Discipline	Short program or Rhythm dance	Free skate or Free dance
Men	1.00	2.00
Women	0.80	1.60
Pairs	0.80	1.60
Ice dance	0.80	1.20

Deductions were applied for certain violations like time infractions, stops and restarts, or falls. The total element score and total program component score were added together, minus any deductions, to generate a final performance score for each skater or team.

== Medal summary ==
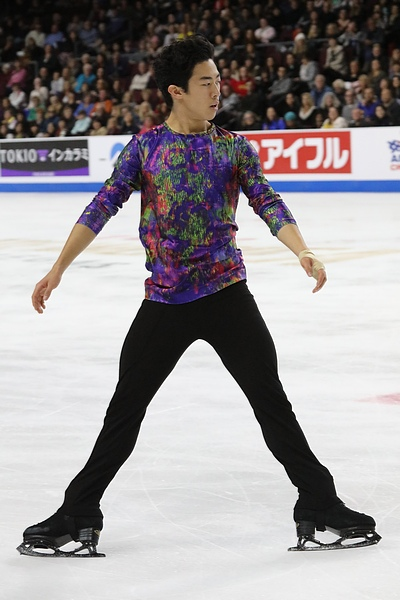
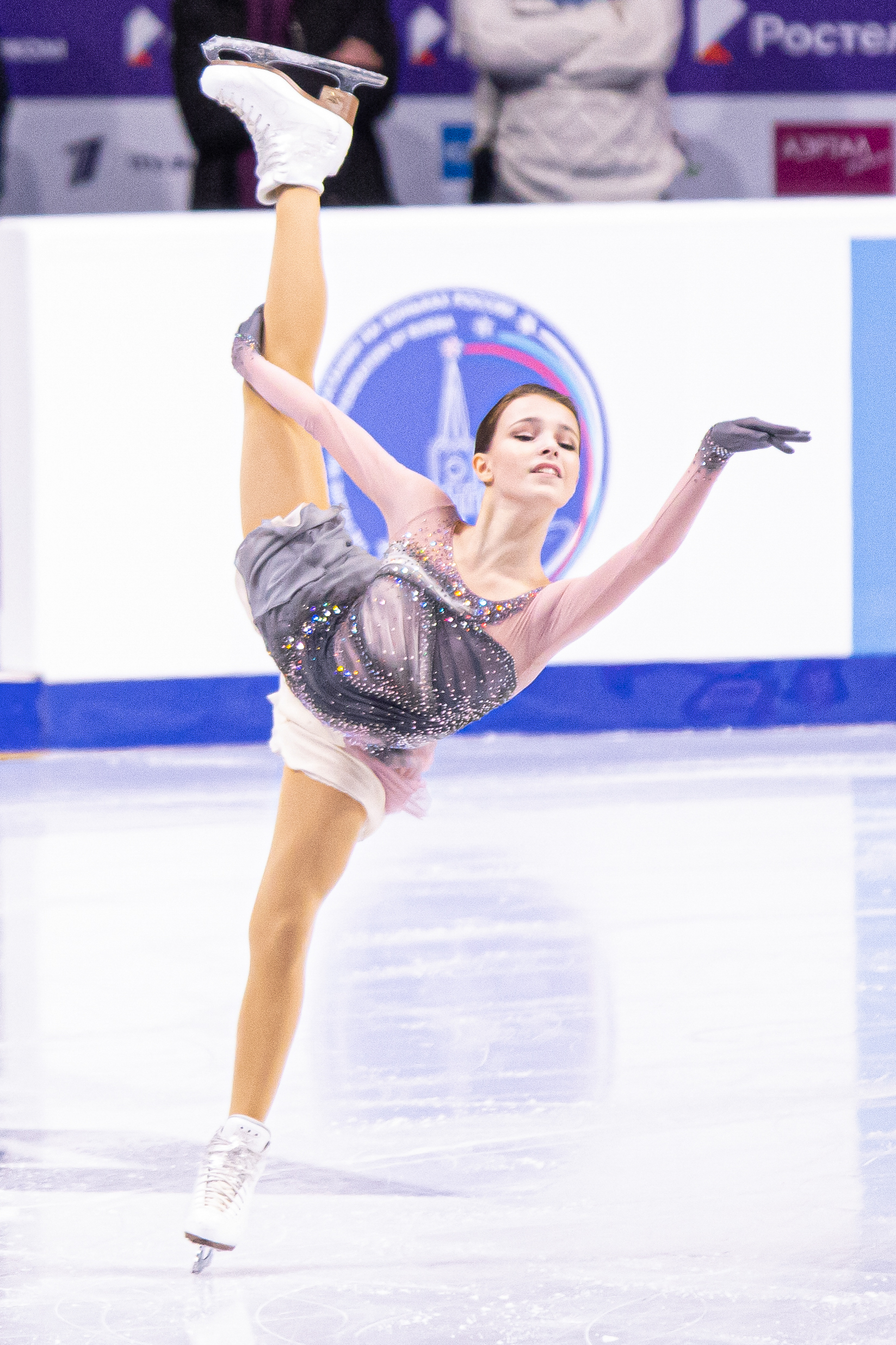
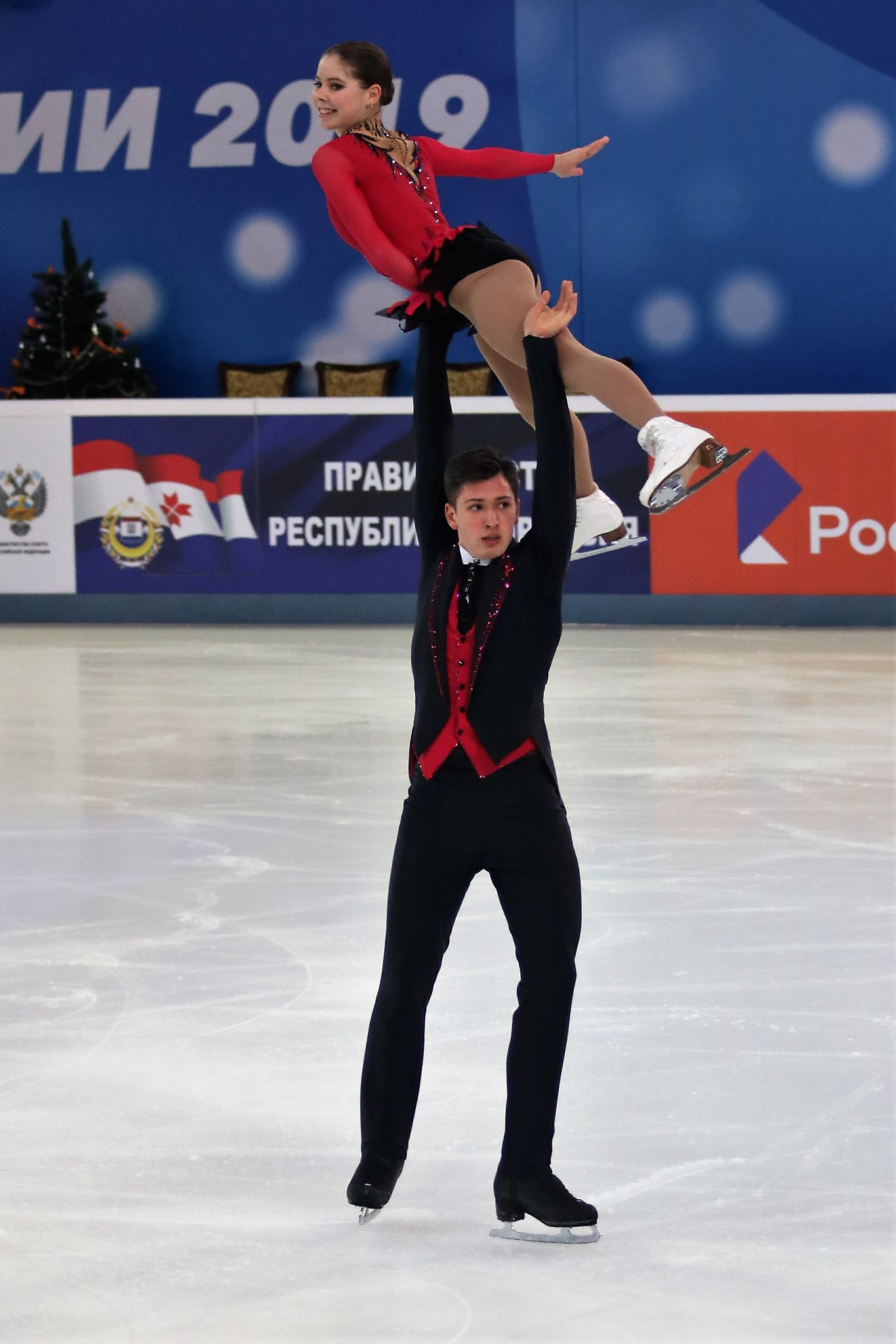
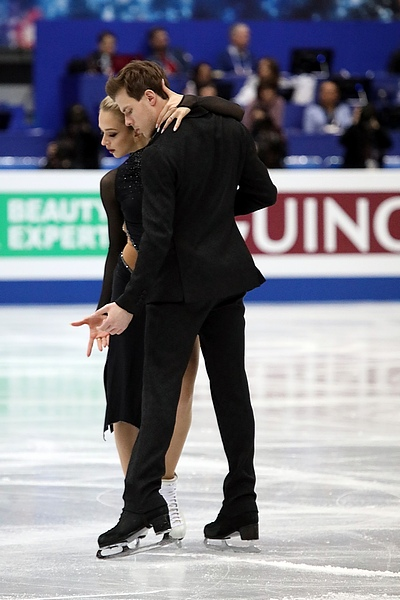
From left to right: The 2021 World Champions: Nathan Chen of the United States (men's singles); Anna Shcherbakova of Russia (women's singles); Anastasia Mishina and Aleksandr Galliamov of Russia (pair skating); and Victoria Sinitsina and Nikita Katsalapov of Russia (ice dance)

=== Medalists ===
Medals were awarded to the skaters or teams who achieved the highest overall placements in each discipline.

Medal recipients
Discipline	Gold	Silver	Bronze
Men	(United States); Nathan Chen	(Japan); Yuma Kagiyama	(Japan); Yuzuru Hanyu
Women	FSR; Anna Shcherbakova	FSR; Elizaveta Tuktamysheva	FSR; Alexandra Trusova
Pairs	FSR; Anastasia Mishina; Aleksandr Galliamov	(China); Sui Wenjing; Han Cong	FSR; Aleksandra Boikova; Dmitrii Kozlovskii
Ice dance	FSR; Victoria Sinitsina; Nikita Katsalapov	(United States); Madison Hubbell; Zachary Donohue	(Canada); Piper Gilles; Paul Poirier

Small medals were awarded to the skaters or teams who achieved the highest short program or rhythm dance placements in each discipline.

Small medal recipients for highest short program or rhythm dance
Discipline	Gold	Silver	Bronze
Men	(Japan); Yuzuru Hanyu	(Japan); Yuma Kagiyama	(United States); Nathan Chen
Women	FSR; Anna Shcherbakova	(Japan); Rika Kihira	FSR; Elizaveta Tuktamysheva
Pairs	FSR; Aleksandra Boikova; Dmitrii Kozlovskii	(China); Sui Wenjing; Han Cong	FSR; Anastasia Mishina; Aleksandr Galliamov
Ice dance	FSR; Victoria Sinitsina; Nikita Katsalapov	(United States); Madison Hubbell; Zachary Donohue	(United States); Madison Chock; Evan Bates

Small medals were awarded to the skaters or teams who achieved the highest free skate or free dance placements in each discipline.

Small medal recipients for highest free skate or free dance
Discipline	Gold	Silver	Bronze
Men	(United States); Nathan Chen	(Japan); Yuma Kagiyama	(Japan); Shoma Uno
Women	FSR; Alexandra Trusova	FSR; Anna Shcherbakova	FSR; Elizaveta Tuktamysheva
Pairs	FSR; Anastasia Mishina; Aleksandr Galliamov	(China); Sui Wenjing; Han Cong	FSR; Evgenia Tarasova; Vladimir Morozov
Ice dance	FSR; Victoria Sinitsina; Nikita Katsalapov	(Canada); Piper Gilles; Paul Poirier	(United States); Madison Hubbell; Zachary Donohue

=== Medals by country ===
Total medals by nation
Rank	Nation	Gold	Silver	Bronze	Total
1	FSR	3	1	2	6
2	United States	1	1	0	2
3	Japan	0	1	1	2
4	China	0	1	0	1
5	Canada	0	0	1	1
Totals (5 entries)		4	4	4	12

== Results ==
=== Men's singles ===
Nathan Chen of the United States, who had been in third place after the short program, rallied back in the free skate, successfully performing five quadruple jumps and finishing with an almost 30-point lead over the silver medalist, Yuma Kagiyama of Japan. This was Chen's third World Championship win in a row; he was the first man to win three titles in a row since Patrick Chan of Canada (2011‍–‍2013), and the first American skater since Scott Hamilton (1982‍–‍1984). Chen had not lost an international event since finishing fifth at the 2018 Winter Olympics. In a statement to the media, Chen said, "The fact that I'm able to be here at this world championship after that unprecedented year... I'm very elated right now."

Yuzuru Hanyu of Japan, two-time Olympic champion and two-time World champion, was in the lead after the short program, but an error on his quadruple loop and stumbles on his triple Axels caused him to finish the competition in third place. It was Hanyu's eighth World Championship medal since 2012.

On the other hand, Vincent Zhou of the United States, who won the bronze medal at the 2019 World Championships, had a disastrous performance during his short program, failing to land all three of his jumping elements. He finished in 25th place, missing the cut-off for the free skate. "It's always better to talk about it than drown in my own misery," Zhou stated afterward. "To me, it feels like I let down my teammates and myself, but dwelling on those things is only going to make me feel worse."

Men's results
Rank	Skater	Nation	Total	SP		FS	
1st place, gold medalist(s)	Nathan Chen	United States	320.88	3	98.85	1	222.03
2nd place, silver medalist(s)	Yuma Kagiyama	Japan	291.77	2	100.96	2	190.81
3rd place, bronze medalist(s)	Yuzuru Hanyu	Japan	289.18	1	106.98	4	182.20
4	Shoma Uno	Japan	277.44	6	92.62	3	184.82
5	Mikhail Kolyada	FSR	272.04	4	93.52	5	178.52
6	Keegan Messing	Canada	270.26	5	93.51	6	176.75
7	Jason Brown	United States	262.17	7	91.25	8	170.92
8	Evgeni Semenenko	FSR	258.45	10	86.86	7	171.59
9	Kévin Aymoz	France	254.52	9	88.24	9	166.28
10	Cha Jun-hwan	South Korea	245.99	8	91.15	13	154.84
11	Matteo Rizzo	Italy	245.37	11	83.30	11	162.07
12	Daniel Grassl	Italy	242.81	15	79.43	10	163.38
13	Yan Han	China	235.31	12	81.52	14	153.79
14	Morisi Kvitelashvili	Georgia	231.81	21	74.66	12	157.15
15	Lukas Britschgi	Switzerland	225.55	17	78.27	16	147.28
16	Aleksandr Selevko	Estonia	222.06	24	70.74	15	151.32
17	Konstantin Milyukov	Belarus	221.33	16	78.86	17	142.47
18	Deniss Vasiļjevs	Latvia	213.05	14	81.22	18	131.83
19	Michal Březina	Czech Republic	210.73	13	81.43	21	129.30
20	Donovan Carrillo	Mexico	204.78	23	73.91	19	130.87
21	Ivan Shmuratko	Ukraine	204.17	22	73.98	20	130.19
22	Jin Boyang	China	199.15	19	77.95	22	121.20
23	Nikolaj Majorov	Sweden	192.79	20	75.59	23	117.20
24	Alexei Bychenko	Israel	190.45	18	78.05	24	112.40
25	Vincent Zhou	United States	70.51	25	70.51	Did not advance to free skate	
26	Paul Fentz	Germany	68.43	26	68.43	Did not advance to free skate	
27	Vladimir Litvintsev	Azerbaijan	68.43	27	68.43	Did not advance to free skate	
28	Başar Oktar	Turkey	67.14	28	67.14	Did not advance to free skate	
29	Maurizio Zandron	Austria	63.88	29	63.88	Did not advance to free skate	
30	Peter James Hallam	Great Britain	61.56	30	61.56	Did not advance to free skate	
31	Valtter Virtanen	Finland	60.27	31	60.27	Did not advance to free skate	
32	Mikhail Shaidorov	Kazakhstan	59.14	32	59.14	Did not advance to free skate	
33	Larry Loupolover	Bulgaria	58.93	33	58.93	Did not advance to free skate	

=== Women's singles ===
Yi Christy Leung of Hong Kong withdrew prior to the short program due to an injury. Likewise, Maé-Bérénice Méité of France suffered an Achilles tendon rupture from a fall during her short program and withdrew from the competition.

Anna Shcherbakova, representing the Figure Skating Federation of Russia, won the gold medal, while her teammates Elizaveta Tuktamysheva and Alexandra Trusova finished second and third, respectively. Trusova had been in twelfth place after the short program, but rallied back with the highest score in the free skating to win the bronze medal. It was the first podium sweep in the women's event at the World Championships since 1991, when skaters from the United States captured the top three spots.

Karen Chen of the United States finished in fourth place, performing an "inspired program" and securing three spots for the United States in the women's event at the 2022 Winter Olympics. This was a near-repeat of Chen's performance at the 2017 World Championships, where she had also finished fourth, securing three spots for the United States at the 2018 Winter Olympics.

Women's results
Rank	Skater	Nation	Total	SP		FS	
1st place, gold medalist(s)	Anna Shcherbakova	FSR	233.17	1	81.00	2	152.17
2nd place, silver medalist(s)	Elizaveta Tuktamysheva	FSR	220.46	3	78.86	3	141.60
3rd place, bronze medalist(s)	Alexandra Trusova	FSR	217.20	12	64.82	1	152.38
4	Karen Chen	United States	208.63	4	74.40	6	134.23
5	Loena Hendrickx	Belgium	208.44	10	67.28	4	141.16
6	Kaori Sakamoto	Japan	207.80	6	70.38	5	137.42
7	Rika Kihira	Japan	205.70	2	79.08	9	126.62
8	Olga Mikutina	Austria	198.77	11	67.18	7	131.59
9	Bradie Tennell	United States	197.81	7	69.87	8	127.94
10	Lee Hae-in	South Korea	193.44	8	68.94	11	124.50
11	Kim Ye-lim	South Korea	191.78	5	73.63	13	118.15
12	Ekaterina Ryabova	Azerbaijan	189.46	13	64.11	10	125.35
13	Madeline Schizas	Canada	185.78	9	68.77	14	117.01
14	Eva-Lotta Kiibus	Estonia	181.47	19	59.65	12	121.82
15	Josefin Taljegård	Sweden	178.10	15	61.58	16	116.52
16	Lindsay van Zundert	Netherlands	174.50	24	57.72	15	116.78
17	Alexandra Feigin	Bulgaria	173.52	17	59.97	18	113.55
18	Nicole Schott	Germany	172.80	20	59.09	17	113.71
19	Satoko Miyahara	Japan	172.30	16	59.99	19	112.31
20	Alina Urushadze	Georgia	169.01	18	59.89	20	109.12
21	Chen Hongyi	China	162.79	22	58.81	21	103.98
22	Eliška Březinová	Czech Republic	155.14	21	58.81	22	96.33
23	Natasha McKay	Great Britain	153.46	23	58.15	23	95.31
24	Jenni Saarinen	Finland	146.54	14	63.54	24	83.00
25	Alexia Paganini	Switzerland	57.23	25	57.23	Did not advance to free skate	
26	Kailani Craine	Australia	56.86	26	56.86	Did not advance to free skate	
27	Emily Bausback	Canada	55.74	27	55.74	Did not advance to free skate	
28	Lara Naki Gutmann	Italy	55.64	28	55.64	Did not advance to free skate	
29	Emmy Ma	Chinese Taipei	55.63	29	55.63	Did not advance to free skate	
30	Júlia Láng	Hungary	54.20	30	54.20	Did not advance to free skate	
31	Nelli Ioffe	Israel	52.43	31	52.43	Did not advance to free skate	
32	Ekaterina Kurakova	Poland	52.28	32	52.28	Did not advance to free skate	
33	Angelīna Kučvaļska	Latvia	47.94	33	47.94	Did not advance to free skate	
34	Daša Grm	Slovenia	47.76	34	47.76	Did not advance to free skate	
35	Anastasiia Arkhypova	Ukraine	45.07	35	45.07	Did not advance to free skate	
36	Emilea Zingas	Cyprus	43.20	36	43.20	Did not advance to free skate	
37	Elžbieta Kropa	Lithuania	41.31	37	41.31	Did not advance to free skate	
WD	Maé-Bérénice Méité	France	Withdrew from competition				
WD	Yi Christy Leung	Hong Kong	Withdrew from competition				

=== Pairs ===
Anastasia Mishina and Aleksandr Galliamov, representing the Figure Skating Federation of Russia, won the gold medal at their first World Championship competition after winning the free skating segment with their performance to the Queen songs "Bohemian Rhapsody" and "We Are the Champions". Mishina and Galliamov had won the World Junior Championships just two years earlier. They were the first pairs team to win the World Championships in their first appearance since Ekaterina Gordeeva and Sergei Grinkov in 1986.

Sui Wenjing and Han Cong of China, 2018 Winter Olympic silver medalists and two-time World Champions, finished in second place. Due to injury, Sui and Han had only been able to practice on ice together for two months. Meanwhile, Aleksandra Boikova and Dmitrii Kozlovskii of Russia, who were in the lead after the short program, finished in third place.

Pairs results
Rank	Team	Nation	Total	SP		FS	
1st place, gold medalist(s)	Anastasia Mishina; Aleksandr Galliamov	FSR	227.59	3	75.79	1	151.80
2nd place, silver medalist(s)	Sui Wenjing; Han Cong	China	225.71	2	77.62	2	148.09
3rd place, bronze medalist(s)	Aleksandra Boikova; Dmitrii Kozlovskii	FSR	217.63	1	80.16	4	137.47
4	Evgenia Tarasova; Vladimir Morozov	FSR	212.76	4	71.46	3	141.30
5	Peng Cheng; Jin Yang	China	201.18	5	71.32	6	129.86
6	Kirsten Moore-Towers; Michael Marinaro	Canada	195.29	10	63.45	5	131.84
7	Alexa Knierim; Brandon Frazier	United States	192.10	7	64.67	7	127.43
8	Nicole Della Monica; Matteo Guarise	Italy	186.50	11	59.95	8	126.55
9	Ashley Cain-Gribble; Timothy LeDuc	United States	185.31	6	64.94	9	120.37
10	Riku Miura; Ryuichi Kihara	Japan	184.41	8	64.37	10	120.04
11	Miriam Ziegler; Severin Kiefer	Austria	182.30	9	64.01	11	118.29
12	Evelyn Walsh; Trennt Michaud	Canada	176.24	12	59.41	12	116.83
13	Annika Hocke; Robert Kunkel	Germany	162.81	13	57.48	14	105.33
14	Ioulia Chtchetinina; Márk Magyar	Hungary	157.87	18	51.21	13	106.66
15	Jelizaveta Žuková; Martin Bidař	Czech Republic	157.29	16	54.30	15	102.99
16	Anastasiia Metelkina; Daniil Parkman	Georgia	156.73	14	56.13	16	100.60
17	Rebecca Ghilardi; Filippo Ambrosini	Italy	154.04	15	54.70	18	99.34
18	Bogdana Lukashevich; Alexander Stepanov	Belarus	145.55	20	46.20	17	99.35
19	Anna Vernikov; Evgeni Krasnopolski	Israel	145.03	17	53.67	20	91.36
20	Cléo Hamon; Denys Strekalin	France	144.84	19	50.99	19	93.85
21	Lana Petranović; Antonio Souza-Kordeiru	Croatia	44.75	21	44.75	Did not advance to free skate	
22	Daria Danilova; Michel Tsiba	Netherlands	43.12	22	43.12	Did not advance to free skate	
23	Coline Keriven; Noël-Antoine Pierre	France	42.12	23	42.12	Did not advance to free skate	
24	Zoe Jones; Christopher Boyadji	Great Britain	38.79	24	38.79	Did not advance to free skate	

=== Ice dance ===
Tina Garabedian and Simon Proulx-Sénécal of Armenia withdrew prior to the rhythm dance for an unspecified medical reason, which was later revealed to be a false positive COVID-19 test from Proulx-Sénécal.

Victoria Sinitsina and Nikita Katsalapov, representing the Figure Skating Federation of Russia, won both the rhythm dance and free dance segments, including a personal best score in the free dance, to win the World Championship title. They were the first Russian team to win a World Championship title in ice dance since Oksana Domnina and Maxim Shabalin in 2009. Madison Hubbell and Zachary Donohue of the United States finished in second place with a "captivating program." "It is really a joy to skate together," Hubbell stated afterward, "but there is also that little dissatisfaction of not reaching our goal of bringing home the gold medal." Likewise, their teammates Madison Chock and Evan Bates had hoped to win a third world medal with their iconic snake charming program, but finished in fourth place after Bates made a minor error on his twizzles. Still, their high performance, along with that of Hubbell and Donohue, netted the United States three quota spots in ice dance at the 2022 Winter Olympics.

Piper Gilles and Paul Poirier of Canada, who had hoped to win a World Championship medal in Montreal, which had been scheduled to host the 2020 World Championships before it was cancelled due to the COVID-19 pandemic, finished in third place. Their total score of 214.35 was a new personal best. "I think we're absolutely thrilled with what we did today," Gilles said afterward. "We just love to perform and skate and I think that came out on the ice today."

Ice dance results
Rank	Team	Nation	Total	RD		FD	
1st place, gold medalist(s)	Victoria Sinitsina; Nikita Katsalapov	FSR	221.17	1	88.15	1	133.02
2nd place, silver medalist(s)	Madison Hubbell; Zachary Donohue	United States	214.71	2	86.05	3	128.66
3rd place, bronze medalist(s)	Piper Gilles; Paul Poirier	Canada	214.35	4	83.37	2	130.98
4	Madison Chock; Evan Bates	United States	212.69	3	85.15	4	127.54
5	Alexandra Stepanova; Ivan Bukin	FSR	208.77	5	83.02	5	125.75
6	Charlène Guignard; Marco Fabbri	Italy	205.20	6	81.04	6	124.16
7	Lilah Fear; Lewis Gibson	Great Britain	196.92	8	77.42	7	119.50
8	Laurence Fournier Beaudry; Nikolaj Sørensen	Canada	196.88	7	77.87	8	119.01
9	Kaitlin Hawayek; Jean-Luc Baker	United States	188.51	11	75.08	9	113.43
10	Tiffany Zahorski; Jonathan Guerreiro	FSR	188.45	10	75.58	10	112.87
11	Sara Hurtado; Kirill Khaliavin	Spain	186.13	12	74.26	11	111.87
12	Natalia Kaliszek; Maksym Spodyriev	Poland	183.33	9	76.12	14	107.21
13	Wang Shiyue; Liu Xinyu	China	182.90	13	73.97	12	108.93
14	Marjorie Lajoie; Zachary Lagha	Canada	180.71	14	72.00	13	108.71
15	Allison Reed; Saulius Ambrulevičius	Lithuania	178.18	15	71.29	15	106.89
16	Adelina Galyavieva; Louis Thauron	France	173.55	16	69.99	16	103.56
17	Evgeniia Lopareva; Geoffrey Brissaud	France	169.70	19	66.80	17	102.90
18	Katharina Müller; Tim Dieck	Germany	168.33	17	68.37	19	99.96
19	Misato Komatsubara; Tim Koleto	Japan	167.81	18	68.02	20	99.79
20	Oleksandra Nazarova; Maksym Nikitin	Ukraine	167.34	20	66.54	18	100.80
21	Juulia Turkkila; Matthias Versluis	Finland	64.59	21	64.59	Did not advance to free dance	
22	Natálie Taschlerová; Filip Taschler	Czech Republic	64.00	22	64.00	Did not advance to free dance	
23	Anna Yanovskaya; Ádám Lukács	Hungary	62.78	23	62.78	Did not advance to free dance	
24	Holly Harris; Jason Chan	Australia	60.73	24	60.73	Did not advance to free dance	
25	Carolina Moscheni; Francesco Fioretti	Italy	60.60	25	60.60	Did not advance to free dance	
26	Shira Ichilov; Laurent Abecassis	Israel	55.57	26	55.57	Did not advance to free dance	
27	Yuliia Zhata; Berk Akalın	Turkey	52.21	27	52.21	Did not advance to free dance	
28	Viktoria Semenjuk; Ilya Yukhimuk	Belarus	51.15	28	51.15	Did not advance to free dance	
29	Chelsea Verhaegh; Sherim van Geffen	Netherlands	50.79	29	50.79	Did not advance to free dance	
30	Ekaterina Kuznetsova; Oleksandr Kolosovskyi	Azerbaijan	46.19	30	46.19	Did not advance to free dance	
31	Mina Zdravkova; Christopher Davis	Bulgaria	45.28	31	45.28	Did not advance to free dance	
WD	Tina Garabedian; Simon Proulx-Sénécal	Armenia	Withdrew from competition				

== Olympic qualifying results ==
The results of the 2021 World Championships determined 82 spots for the 2022 Winter Olympics: 23 entries in the men's event, 24 in the women's event, 16 in the pairs event, and 19 in the ice dance event. One allocated spot in men's singles was unused due to an insufficient number of member nations meeting the criteria, and the spot was re-allocated to the next qualifying event: the 2021 Nebelhorn Trophy.

Athletes from Russia would compete under the Russian Olympic Committee (ROC) flag at the 2022 Winter Olympics.

Number of Olympic quota spots per discipline
Spots	Men	Women	Pairs	Ice dance
3	Japan	Japan; ROC	ROC	Canada; ROC; United States
2	Italy; ROC; United States	South Korea; United States	Canada; China; Italy; United States	—N/a
1	Belarus; Canada; China; Czech Republic; Estonia; France; Georgia; Israel; Latvia; Mexico; South Korea; Sweden; Switzerland; Ukraine	Austria; Azerbaijan; Belgium; Bulgaria; Canada; China; Czech Republic; Estonia; Georgia; Germany; Great Britain; Finland; Netherlands; Sweden	Austria; Czech Republic; Germany; Hungary; Japan	China; France; Germany; Great Britain; Italy; Japan; Lithuania; Poland; Spain; Ukraine

== Works cited ==
- "Special Regulations & Technical Rules – Single & Pair Skating and Ice Dance 2021". International Skating Union. June 2021. Archived from the original on 18 June 2025 – via Scribd.
