= ISU Junior Grand Prix of Figure Skating =

Recurring figure skating series

- Status: Active
- Genre: ISU Junior Grand Prix
- Frequency: Annual
- Inaugurated: 1997
- Previous event: 2025–26 Junior Grand Prix
- Next event: 2026–27 Junior Grand Prix
- Organizer: International Skating Union

The ISU Junior Grand Prix of Figure Skating – originally called the ISU Junior Series – was established by the International Skating Union (ISU) in 1997 and consists of a series of seven international figure skating competitions exclusively for junior-level skaters. The locations of the JGP events change every year. Medals may be awarded in men's singles, women's singles, pair skating, and ice dance. While all seven competitions feature the men's, women's, and ice dance events, only four competitions each season feature the pairs event. Skaters earn points based on their results each season, and the top skaters or teams in each discipline are then invited to compete at the Junior Grand Prix of Figure Skating Final. Beginning with the 2008–09 figure skating season, the Junior Grand Prix Final has been held in conjunction with the Grand Prix of Figure Skating Final.

Skaters are eligible to compete on the junior-level circuit if they are at least 13 years old before July 1 of the respective season, but not yet 19 (for single skaters), 21 (for men and women in ice dance and women in pair skating), or 23 (for men in pair skating). Competitors are chosen by their respective skating federations. The number of entries allotted to each ISU member nation in each discipline is determined by their results at the prior World Junior Figure Skating Championships. Each skater or team is limited to participating in no more than two Junior Grand Prix competitions per season.

Switzerland hosted the very first Junior Grand Prix of Figure Skating Final, the culminating event of the Junior Grand Prix series, in 1997 in Lausanne. Timothy Goebel of the United States won the men's event, also becoming the first skater in the world to successfully perform a quadruple Salchow in competition and the first American skater to land a quadruple jump of any kind in competition. At the 2002 Junior Grand Prix Final in The Hague, Miki Ando of Japan became the first woman to land a quadruple jump in competition when she performed a quadruple Salchow.

== Reaction to the COVID-19 pandemic ==
On April 30, 2020, the International Skating Union (ISU) established a working group, chaired by ISU Vice-president for Figure Skating Alexander Lakernik, to monitor the ongoing COVID-19 pandemic. Its responsibilities included determining the feasibility of holding events as scheduled, possibly behind closed doors, during the first half of the 2020–21 season; and the financial impact of any potential cancellations. The ISU also announced that any host federation needed to make a decision regarding cancellation of their Junior Grand Prix (JGP) event at least ten weeks prior to the event.

On May 16, the Slovak Figure Skating Association informed the ISU that it had cancelled all events that it was scheduled to host due to the pandemic, including the second event of the 2020–21 Junior Grand Prix series. On May 26, Skate Canada cancelled the first event of the JGP series. On July 3, the Japan Skating Federation cancelled its event in Yokohama, originally scheduled to be the fourth in the series. The Japan Skating Federation later announced on July 13 that it would not send any skaters to any Junior Grand Prix event, even if the competitions proceeded as scheduled.

On July 13, the ISU announced major changes to the JGP format, including:

- No ISU Junior Grand Prix points would be awarded and no ISU Junior Grand Prix Ranking for 2020–21 would be established.
- There would be no pre-allocated entries for ISU members to participate in each Junior Grand Prix event and ISU members could choose the events in which they would enter their skaters.

At this point, there were only five JGP events still on the schedule: Hungary, the Czech Republic, Uzbekistan, Slovenia, and Latvia. On July 20, the ISU officially cancelled all events of the series, citing increased travel and entry requirements between countries and potentially excessive sanitary and health care costs for host members.

== Competitions ==
Color key
●	This country hosted a Junior Grand Prix of Figure Skating event.
★	This country hosted the Junior Grand Prix of Figure Skating Final.
†	A Junior Grand Prix event scheduled to be held in this country was cancelled.
●	This country is scheduled to host a Junior Grand Prix of Figure Skating event in the upcoming season.

Event	1997	1998	1999	2000	2001	2002	2003	2004	2005	2006	2007	2008	2009	2010	2011	2012	2013	2014	2015	2016	2017	2018	2019	2020	2021	2022	2023	2024	2025	2026	2027
Andorra									●																						
Armenia																						●				† (Note: Armenia was originally scheduled to host the fourth Junior Grand Prix competition in Yerevan, but it was cancelled following the Azerbaijani invasion of Armenia. The event was not moved, and skaters scheduled to attend were reallocated to the events in either Poland or Italy.)	●				
Australia															●						●										
Austria											●			●	●	●			●		●	●			●		●				
Azerbaijan																													●		
Belarus												●	●				●				●										
Bulgaria	●	●			●		●		●	★	●																				
Canada			●			●			●						★							★ (Note: Canada hosted a Junior Grand Prix event in Richmond in addition to the Junior Grand Prix Final in Vancouver.)		† (Note: Canada was originally scheduled to host the first Junior Grand Prix event in Richmond, but Skate Canada cancelled it due to the COVID-19 pandemic.)	† (Note: Canada was originally scheduled to host the second Junior Grand Prix event in Edmonton, but Skate Canada cancelled the event due to uncertainties surrounding the COVID-19 pandemic. It was instead allotted to France, who hosted two competitions back-to-back in Courchevel.)		★				
China		●		●		●		●						★										† (Note: The ISU officially cancelled all of the Junior Grand Prix events for the 2020–21 season due to the COVID-19 pandemic.)				● (Note: France was originally scheduled to host the seventh Junior Grand Prix competition in Épinal, but withdrew the event. It was instead allotted to China, who hosted the competition in Wuxi.)		★ (Note: China will host a Junior Grand Prix event in Xi'an in addition to the Junior Grand Prix Final in Chongqing.)	●
Croatia			●				●		●		●		●			●		●	●		●		●			† (Note: Croatia was originally set to host the fifth Junior Grand Prix event in Zagreb, but the Croatian Skating Federation cancelled it, citing "logistical reasons". It was instead allotted to Poland, who hosted two back-to-back competitions in Gdańsk.)					
Czech Republic			●	●	●		●		★	●		●		●			●	●		●		●		†		●		●			●
Estonia									●		●				●		●	●		●											
Finland								★																							
France	●	●		●		●		●		●		●		●		●		●		★ (Note: France hosted a Junior Grand Prix event in Saint-Gervais-les-Bains in addition to the Junior Grand Prix Final in Marseille.)			●		●	●		★			●
Georgia																														●	●
Germany	●	●		●		●		●			●		●	●		●		●		●											
Great Britain				★							●	●		●																	
Hungary	●	●						●		●			●											†			●				
Italy					●	●						●			●						●		★ (Note: Italy hosted a Junior Grand Prix event in Egna in addition to the Junior Grand Prix Final in Turin.)			★			●		
Japan			●		●		●		●				★	●			★	●		●	★			† (Note: Japan was originally scheduled to host the fourth Junior Grand Prix event in Yokohama, but the Japan Skating Federation cancelled the event due to the COVID-19 pandemic.)	† (Note: The 2021 Junior Grand Prix Final was cancelled due to the situation with the Omicron variant in Japan.)		●		★		
Latvia															●		●		●		●		●	† (Note: After the cancellation of the Junior Grand Prix events scheduled in Canada and Slovakia, an event in Riga was added to the calendar. Ultimately, the ISU officially cancelled all of the Junior Grand Prix events for the 2020–21 season due to the COVID-19 pandemic.)		●		●	●	●	●
Lithuania																						●									
Mexico		●		●			●			●		●					●														
Netherlands			●		●	★				●																					
Norway			●	●						●																					
Poland			★	●	●		●		●		★		●		●		●		●		●		●		●	●	●	●	●	●	
Romania								●		●	●			●	●																
Russia																★				●			●		●						
Serbia (Yugoslavia)						●		●																							
Slovakia	●	●				●	●		●								●		●			●		† (Note: Slovakia was originally scheduled to host the second Junior Grand Prix event in Košice, but the Slovak Figure Skating Association cancelled the event due to the COVID-19 pandemic.)	●						
Slovenia			●		★		●									●		●		●		●		†	●			●		●	
South Africa												●																			
South Korea												★																			
Spain												●						★	★ (Note: Spain hosted a Junior Grand Prix event in Logroño in addition to the Junior Grand Prix Final in Barcelona.)												
Sweden			●		●		★																								
Switzerland	★																														
Taiwan										●																					
Thailand																											●	●	●	●	●
Turkey													●			●											●	●	●	●	●
Ukraine	●	●		●				●																							
United Arab Emirates																													●		
United States		★			† (Note: The Junior Grand Prix competition in Scottsdale, Arizona, was cancelled following the September 11 terrorist attacks.)	●		●			●		●			●			●				●								
Uzbekistan																								†							
Ref.																															
