= 2021 World Junior Figure Skating Championships =

- Type: ISU Championship
- Date: 1 – 7 March
- Season: 2020–21
- Location: Harbin, China
- Host: Chinese Skating Association
- Venue: Heilongjiang Provincial Skating Arena
- Previous: 2020 World Junior Championships
- Next: 2022 World Junior Championships

The 2021 World Junior Figure Skating Championships was a figure skating competition sanctioned by the International Skating Union (ISU), originally scheduled to be hosted by the Chinese Skating Association. It would have been held at the Heilongjiang Provincial Skating Arena in Harbin, China, from 1 to 7 March 2021. Medals would have been awarded in men's singles, women's singles, pair skating, and ice dance, and the competition would have determined the entry quotas for each federation for the 2021–22 ISU Junior Grand Prix series and the 2022 World Junior Championships. However, the ISU announced the cancellation of the event on 24 November 2020, citing "the pandemic developments and related impact on the organizers and participants."

== Background ==
The International Skating Union (ISU) adopted legislation in 1975 establishing the Junior Figure Skating Championships. The championships were established on a two-year trial basis with the understanding that if they were successful, they would be renamed the World Junior Figure Skating Championships. The inaugural World Junior Championships took place in Megève, France, in 1976.

The 2021 World Junior Championships were originally scheduled to be held at the Heilongjiang Provincial Skating Arena in Harbin, China, from 1 to 7 March 2021. Due to the ongoing COVID-19 pandemic, the General Administration of Sport of China announced on 9 July 2020 that no international sporting events would be held in China in 2020 except for test events for the 2022 Winter Olympics, which were scheduled to be held in Beijing The ISU announced on 13 July that the 2020 Cup of China would be held as scheduled due to its connection to the Olympic test event, the Grand Prix of Figure Skating Final.

However, the ISU announced the cancellation of the World Junior Championships on 24 November 2020. The World Junior Championships were the second ISU Championship event to be cancelled during the 2020–21 season, following the cancellation of the 2021 Four Continents Championships on 16 October. The 2020–21 ISU Junior Grand Prix series had also been cancelled earlier in the season, on 20 July. With the cancellation of the World Junior Championships, there was effectively no opportunity for junior-level skaters to compete during the 2020–21 season.

== Qualification ==
Skaters were eligible to compete at the World Junior Championships if they represented a member nation of the International Skating Union and were selected by their federation. Member nations selected their entries according to their own criteria. Some countries relied on the results of their national championships while others had more varied criteria. All skaters must have earned the minimum total element scores, which were determined and published each season by the ISU during the current or immediately previous season.

Skaters who reached the age of 13 before 1 July 2020, but had not turned 19 (for single skaters and females in pair skating) or 21 (for males in pair skating) were eligible to compete at the World Junior Championships. Due to disruptions in skaters' training schedules resulting from the COVID-19 pandemic, the ISU extended the upper age limit for skaters in junior ice dance by one year. However, the new age limit only applied to couples who competed together during the 2019–20 season and maintained the same programs for the 2020–21 season.

Based on the results of the 2020 World Junior Championships, these nations would have been eligible to enter more than one skater or team in the indicated disciplines.

Number of entries per discipline
Spots	Men	Women	Pairs	Ice dance
3	Japan; Russia; United States	South Korea; Russia; United States	Russia	Georgia; Russia; United States
2	Canada; Estonia; France; Italy	Azerbaijan; Canada; Japan; Poland	Canada; China; France; Georgia; Germany; United States	Canada; France
