= 2020–21 figure skating season =

Competitive figure skating year

- Date: July 1, 2020 – June 30, 2021
- Previous: 2019–20
- Next: 2021–22

The 2020–21 figure skating season began on July 1, 2020, and ended on June 30, 2021. During this season, elite skaters competed at the 2021 World Championships, as well as at elite events such as the Grand Prix series and the Challenger Series.

Due to the COVID-19 pandemic, the International Skating Union (ISU) cancelled the Junior Grand Prix series and the Grand Prix Final. Additionally, the 2021 European Championships, Four Continents Championships, and World Junior Championships were all cancelled, although the 2021 World Championships were still held.

== Impact of the COVID-19 pandemic ==
On May 1, 2020, the International Skating Union established a working group, chaired by ISU Vice-president for Figure Skating Alexander Lakernik, to monitor the ongoing COVID-19 pandemic. Its responsibilities included determining the feasibility of holding events as scheduled, possibly behind closed doors, during the first half of the season, and the financial impact of any potential cancellations. On August 31, the ISU published the official Guidelines for ISU Events During the COVID-19 Pandemic.

On July 9, the General Administration of Sport of China announced that no international sporting events would be held in China in 2020 except for 2022 Winter Olympics test events. The Chinese Skating Association was scheduled to host several events during the season, including the Cup of China, the Grand Prix Final, and the World Junior Championships. While the Grand Prix Final, scheduled to be hosted in Beijing, was exempt from the Chinese government's ruling due to its status as the test event for the Olympic Games, the ISU had not yet discussed a contingency plan regarding Grand Prix event cancellations at the time of the Chinese government's announcement. The ISU announced on July 13 that the Cup of China would remain as scheduled in Chongqing due to its connection to the Beijing test event: the Grand Prix Final.

On July 20, the ISU officially cancelled the Junior Grand Prix series, citing increased travel and entry requirements between countries and potentially excessive sanitary & health care costs for hosting members. Over half of the events of the 2020–21 ISU Challenger Series were also either cancelled by the host federations or postponed to an unspecified later date.

On August 4, the ISU confirmed that the Grand Prix series would proceed as scheduled during the fall, with a decision to be made regarding the Grand Prix Final at a later date. The competitions were expected to feature skaters from the home country, skaters already training in the host nation, and skaters assigned to that event for geographic reasons; all officials would also be from the national organizing committee. On September 25, U.S. Figure Skating announced that Skate America would be held without an audience in line with Nevada Gaming Control Board guidelines regarding the pandemic. On September 30, the ISU announced that the Grand Prix Final would not be held as scheduled in Beijing on December 10–13, and that they were searching for an alternate host outside China for the event. On October 14, Skate Canada announced the cancellation of the 2020 Skate Canada International due to the worsening situation in Ontario. The French Federation of Ice Sports informed the ISU of the cancellation of the 2020 Internationaux de France on October 19. In November, the Grand Prix Final was first removed from China altogether, before being definitively cancelled on December 10, 2020. The ISU later rescheduled the Beijing test event to the 2021 Asian Open Figure Skating Trophy in October.

On October 16, the ISU announced the cancellation of the 2021 Four Continents Championships. On November 24, the 2021 World Junior Championships were also cancelled. On December 10, the ISU announced the definitive cancellation of the Grand Prix Final alongside the cancellation of the 2021 European Championships. The 2021 World Championships were held as scheduled in Stockholm, Sweden, on March 22–28, although three positive COVID-19 cases were detected during the event. In addition, the ISU slightly modified the qualification rules to allow additional skaters the opportunity to meet the minimum TES requirements.

Due to the vast difference in skaters' travel restrictions, the ISU determined that it would be unfair to award points towards the World Standings and Season's World Ranking at the Challenger Series and Grand Prix events. Thus, the 2021 World Championships were the only event to affect the 2020–21 ISU world standings. As the Junior Grand Prix and World Junior Championships were cancelled, junior skaters had no opportunities to earn World Standing Points for the season.

Scores earned at the domestic Grand Prix events did not count as official ISU scores for the purposes of achieving minimum TES requirements or as personal/season's bests. Thus, the season's best scores list was composed entirely of scores earned on the Challenger Series, where the 2020 Nebelhorn Trophy and 2020 Budapest Trophy were the only two of ten scheduled events to be held, the 2021 World Championships, and the 2021 World Team Trophy.

=== ISU member nations' response ===
Several countries postponed or cancelled their national championships. U.S. Figure Skating relocated the 2021 U.S. Championships to be able to create an isolated bubble environment.

== Season notes ==
=== Age eligibility ===
Skaters were eligible to compete in International Skating Union (ISU) events at the junior or senior levels according to their age. These rules may not have applied to non-ISU events such as national championships.

Level	Date of birth
Junior (females in singles and pairs; males in singles)	Born between July 1, 2001 & June 30, 2007
Junior (males in pairs)	Born between July 1, 1999 & June 30, 2007
Junior (females in ice dance) (Note: Due to disturbances in skaters' training schedules resulting from the COVID-19 pandemic, the ISU extended the upper age limit for skaters in junior and novice ice dance by one year. However, the new age limit only applied to couples who competed together during the 2019–20 season and maintained the same programs for the 2020–21 season.)	Born between July 1, 2000 & June 30, 2007
Junior (males in ice dance)	Born between July 1, 1998 & June 30, 2007
Senior (all disciplines)	Born before July 1, 2005

== Changes ==
If skaters of different nationalities team up, the ISU requires that they choose one country to represent.
Date refers to date when the change occurred or, if not available, the date when the change was announced.

=== Partnership changes ===
Date	Skaters	Disc.	Type	Notes	Ref.
July 3, 2020	(United States) Lorraine McNamara / Anton Spiridonov	Ice dance	Formed		
July 6, 2020	(Italy) Federica Zamponi / Marco Zandron	Pairs	Dissolved		
July 16, 2020	(Italy) Chiara Calderone / Aleksei Dubrovin	Ice dance	Formed		
July 18, 2020	(Russia) Polina Kostiukovich / Aleksei Briukhanov	Pairs	Formed		
July 24, 2020	(Germany) Amanda Peterson / Maximilian Pfisterer	Ice dance	Dissolved		
July 24, 2020	(Germany) Lara Luft / Maximilian Pfisterer	Ice dance	Formed		
July 26, 2020	(Russia) Alena Kanysheva / Andrei Pylin	Ice dance	Formed		
August 2, 2020	(Canada) Justine Brasseur / Zachary Daleman	Pairs	Formed		
August 16, 2020	(Russia) Lina Kudriavtseva / Ilia Spiridonov	Pairs	Dissolved		
August 16, 2020	(Russia) Valeria Ponosova / Dmitrii Ialin	Pairs	Formed		
August 21, 2020	(Philippines) Isabella Gamez / David-Alexandre Paradis	Pairs	Dissolved	Paradis retired.	
August 27, 2020	(United Kingdom) Emily Rose Brown / James Hernandez	Ice dance	Dissolved	Brown retired.	
August 28, 2020	(New Zealand) Charlotte Lafond-Fournier / Richard Kam	Ice dance	Formed	For New Zealand	
September 15, 2020	(Germany) Elena Pavlova / Ruben Blommaert	Pairs	Dissolved		
September 15, 2020	(Germany) Alisa Efimova / Ruben Blommaert	Pairs	Formed	For Germany	
September 16, 2020	(Russia) Anastasia Shpilevaya / Grigory Smirnov	Ice dance	Dissolved		
September 21, 2020	(China) Wang Xuehan / Wang Lei	Pairs	Dissolved		
September 21, 2020	(China) Yu Xiaoyu / Zhang Hao	Pairs	Dissolved		
September 21, 2020	(China) Yu Xiaoyu / Wang Lei	Pairs	Formed		
October 8, 2020	(Russia) Maria Pavlova / Ilia Spiridonov	Pairs	Formed		
October 8, 2020	(Russia) Valeria Ponosova / Dmitrii Ialin	Pairs	Dissolved		
October 8, 2020	(Russia) Stanislava Vislobokova / Dmitrii Ialin	Pairs	Formed		
October 26, 2020	(Turkey) Yuliia Zhata / Berk Akalın	Ice dance	Formed	For Turkey	
November 3, 2020	(Canada) Patricia Andrew / Steven Adcock	Pairs	Formed		
November 13, 2020	(Hungary) Villő Marton / Danijil Szemko	Ice dance	Dissolved		
November 20, 2020	(Italy) Chiara Calderone / Aleksei Dubrovin	Ice dance	Dissolved		
November 20, 2020	(Italy) Chiara Calderone / Francesco Riva	Ice dance	Formed		
November 22, 2020	(Estonia) Darja Netjaga / Marko Jevgeni Gaidajenko	Ice dance	Dissolved		
December 4, 2020	(Belarus) Viktoria Yatsenko / Daniil Parkman	Pairs	Dissolved		
December 4, 2020	(Georgia (country)) Anastasiia Metelkina / Daniil Parkman	Pairs	Formed	For Georgia	
December 4, 2020	(Lithuania) Paulina Ramanauskaitė / Deividas Kizala	Ice dance	Formed		
December 7, 2020	(United States) Kate Finster / Balazs Nagy	Pairs	Dissolved		
December 10, 2020	(United States) Tarah Kayne / Danny O'Shea	Pairs	Dissolved		
December 14, 2020	(Germany) Shari Koch / Christian Nüchtern	Ice dance	Dissolved	Nüchtern retired.	
December 24, 2020	(Spain) Laura Barquero / Marco Zandron	Pairs	Formed	For Spain	
January 2, 2020	(Ukraine) Kateryna Dzitsiuk / Ivan Pavlov	Pairs	Dissolved	Pavlov retired.	
January 3, 2021	(Estonia) Solène Mazingue / Marko Jevgeni Gaidajenko	Ice dance	Formed	For Estonia	
January 11, 2021	(Netherlands) Liubov Efimenko / Dmitry Epstein	Pairs	Dissolved		
January 11, 2021	(Netherlands) Nika Osipova / Dmitry Epstein	Pairs	Formed	For the Netherlands	
January 17, 2021	(United Kingdom) Phebe Bekker / James Hernandez	Ice dance	Formed		
January 18, 2021	(Japan) Utana Yoshida / Shingo Nishiyama	Ice dance	Dissolved		
January 27, 2021	(China) Liu Jiaxi / Xie Zhong	Pairs	Dissolved		
January 30, 2021	(Hungary) Mariia Ignateva / Danijil Szemko	Ice dance	Formed	For Hungary	
February 12, 2021	(Russia) Stanislava Vislobokova / Dmitrii Ialin	Pairs	Dissolved		
March 5, 2021	(Russia) Alena Kanysheva / Andrei Pylin	Ice dance	Dissolved		
March 14, 2021	(Japan) Ayumi Takanami / Shingo Nishiyama	Ice dance	Formed		
March 28, 2021	(Canada) Nadine Wang / Francis Boudreau-Audet	Pairs	Dissolved	Wang retired.	
March 30, 2021	(Croatia) Lana Petranović / Antonio Souza-Kordeiru	Pairs	Dissolved		
April 1, 2021	(Spain) Sofía Val / Nikita Vitryanyuk	Ice dance	Formed	For Spain	
April 2, 2021	(China) Yu Xiaoyu / Wang Lei	Pairs	Dissolved	Yu retired.	
April 21, 2021	(Canada) Vanessa James / Eric Radford	Pairs	Formed	For Canada	
April 30, 2021	(Russia) Alena Kanysheva / Andrei Pylin	Ice dance	Formed		
May 3, 2021	(Russia) Diana Mukhametzianova / Ilya Mironov	Pairs	Dissolved		
May 3, 2021	(Russia) Diana Mukhametzianova / Vladislav Antonyshev	Pairs	Formed		
May 3, 2021	(Russia) Ekaterina Geinish / Ilya Mironov	Pairs	Formed		
May 5, 2021	(Russia) Ksenia Konkina / Pavel Drozd	Ice dance	Dissolved	Konkina retired.	
May 5, 2021	(Russia) Angélique Abachkina / Pavel Drozd	Ice dance	Formed	For Russia	
May 10, 2021	(Japan) Utana Yoshida / Seiji Urano	Ice dance	Formed	For Japan	
May 20, 2021	(Italy) Alyssa Montan / Manuel Piazza	Pairs	Dissolved		
May 20, 2021	(Italy) Anna Valesi / Filippo Clerici	Pairs	Dissolved		
May 20, 2021	(Italy) Alyssa Montan / Filippo Clerici	Pairs	Formed		
May 20, 2021	(Italy) Anna Valesi / Manuel Piazza	Pairs	Formed		
June 11, 2021	(United States) Aljona Savchenko / TJ Nyman	Pairs	Formed	For the United States	
June 25, 2021	(Israel) Anna Vernikov / Evgeni Krasnopolski	Pairs	Dissolved		
June 25, 2021	(Israel) Hailey Kops / Evgeni Krasnopolski	Pairs	Formed		
June 26, 2021	(United States) Chelsea Liu / Danny O'Shea	Pairs	Formed	For the United States	
June 30, 2021	(United States) Kate Finster / Matej Silecky	Pairs	Formed		

=== Retirements ===
Date	Skater(s)	Disc.	Ref.
July 8, 2020	(Russia) Maria Sotskova	Ladies	
July 15, 2020	(United States) Polina Edmunds	Ladies	
July 23, 2020	(Belarus) Yuri Hulitski	Ice dance	
July 27, 2020	(Finland) Viveca Lindfors	Ladies	
August 3, 2020	(Finland) Sofia Sula	Ladies	
September 1, 2020	(Italy) Valentina Marchei	Pairs	
September 2, 2020	(Russia) Daria Panenkova	Ladies	
September 11, 2020	(Russia) Sergei Voronov	Men	
September 22, 2020	(Russia) Elena Radionova	Ladies	
September 29, 2020	(France) Vanessa James / Morgan Ciprès	Pairs	
October 15, 2020	(Russia) Sofia Evdokimova	Ice dance	
October 17, 2020	(Netherlands) Kyarha van Tiel	Ladies	
November 7, 2020	(Poland) Igor Reznichenko	Men	
November 7, 2020	(Poland) Justyna Plutowska / Jérémie Flemin	Ice dance	
November 13, 2020	(United States) Sean Rabbitt	Men	
December 2, 2020	(United Kingdom) Anna Litvinenko	Ladies	
December 14, 2020	(Germany) Christian Nüchtern	Ice dance	
December 15, 2020 (Note: Nagai officially retired after the 2020–21 Japan Championships at the end of December.)	(Japan) Yuka Nagai	Ladies	
December 26, 2020	(Japan) Ryuju Hino	Men	
January 2, 2021	(Ukraine) Ivan Pavlov	Pairs	
January 3, 2021	(Germany) Shari Koch	Ice dance	
January 29, 2021	(Russia) Anastasia Shpilevaya	Ice dance	
February 18, 2021	(China) Zhang Hao	Pairs	
March 19, 2021	(Norway) Sondre Oddvoll Bøe	Men	
April 2, 2021	(China) Yu Xiaoyu	Pairs	
April 30, 2021	(Germany) Aljona Savchenko / Bruno Massot	Pairs	
May 3, 2021	(South Korea) Lee June-hyoung	Men	
May 12, 2021	(United States) Alexei Krasnozhon	Men	
May 19, 2021	(Russia) Ksenia Konkina	Ice dance	
May 26, 2021	(Canada) Alaine Chartrand	Ladies	
May 28, 2021	(Canada) Camille Ruest / Andrew Wolfe	Pairs	
June 16, 2021	(Japan) Rika Hongo	Ladies	
June 22, 2021	(Switzerland) Alexandra Herbríková / Nicolas Roulet	Pairs	

=== Coaching changes ===
Date	Skater(s)	Disc.	From	To	Ref.
July 2, 2020	(Russia) Alexey Erokhov	Men	Eteri Tutberidze & Sergei Dudakov	Viktoria Butsaeva	
July 2, 2020	(United States) Yaroslav Paniot	Men	Tammy Gambill	Todd Eldredge	
July 8, 2020	(Lithuania) Allison Reed / Saulius Ambrulevičius	Ice dance	Marina Zoueva, Rostislav Sinicyn & Martin Skotnický	Romain Haguenauer & Maurizio Margaglio	
July 17, 2020	(United States) Courtney Hicks	Ladies	Christy Krall	Tammy Gambill	
July 31, 2020	(Russia) Alena Kostornaia	Ladies	Eteri Tutberidze, Sergei Dudakov & Daniil Gleikhengauz	Evgeni Plushenko & Sergei Rozanov	
August 21, 2020	(United States) Bradie Tennell	Ladies	Denise Myers & Jeremy Allen	Tom Zakrajsek	
September 16, 2020	(Russia) Evgenia Medvedeva	Ladies	Brian Orser & Tracy Wilson	Eteri Tutberidze, Sergei Dudakov & Daniil Gleikhengauz	
September 17, 2020	(Russia) Anastasia Tarakanova	Ladies	Svetlana Panova, Tatiana Moiseeva & Ilona Protasenia	Ksenia Ivanova, Adian Pitkeev & Alexey Karpushov	
September 20, 2020	(France) Julia Wagret / Pierre Souquet-Basiege	Ice dance	Marina Zoueva & Alper Uçar	Alper Uçar, John Kerr & Nadine Kerr	
September 21, 2020	(United States) Vincent Zhou	Men	Lee Barkell, Lori Nichol & Mie Hamada	Christy Krall, Tom Zakrajsek & Mie Hamada	
September 24, 2020	(United States) Tarah Kayne / Danny O'Shea	Pairs	Dalilah Sappenfield & Larry Ibarra	Jim Peterson & Amanda Evora	
October 5, 2020	(Italy) Matteo Rizzo	Men	Franca Bianconi & Valter Rizzo	Lorenzo Magri & Valter Rizzo	
October 7, 2020	(Japan) Rika Kihira	Ladies	Brian Orser & Mie Hamada	Stéphane Lambiel & Mie Hamada	
October 7, 2020	(Japan) Satoko Miyahara	Ladies	Lee Barkell & Mie Hamada	Lee Barkell & Yuka Sato	
October 16, 2020	(United States) Andrew Torgashev	Men	Christy Krall, Erik Schultz & Joshua Farris	Rafael Arutyunyan & Ilona Melnichenko	
October 16, 2020	(United States) Ting Cui	Ladies	Tom Zakrajsek	Natalia Linichuk	
October 21, 2020	(Russia) Alexander Petrov	Men	Alexei Mishin	Evgeni Plushenko & Sergei Rozanov	
November 16, 2020	(Netherlands) Lindsay van Zundert	Ladies	Ans Bocklandt	Jorik Hendrickx & Carine Herrygers	
December 11, 2020	(United States) Alysa Liu	Ladies	Lee Barkell, Lori Nichol & Massimo Scali	Jeremy Abbott, Lee Barkell, Lori Nichol & Massimo Scali	
December 12, 2020	(Azerbaijan) Ekaterina Ryabova	Ladies	Evgeni Plushenko & Alexander Volkov	Alexei Ryabov	
January 12, 2021	(Azerbaijan) Vladimir Litvintsev	Men	Alexei Chetverukhin & Anastasia Kazakova	Evgeni Plushenko & Sergei Rozanov	
January 13, 2021	(Russia) Stanislava Konstantinova	Ladies	Evgeni Plushenko & Alexander Volkov	Viktoria Butsaeva	
January 26, 2021	(Philippines) Michael Christian Martinez	Men	Vyacheslav Zahorodnyuk	Nikolai Morozov	
January 27, 2021	(United States) Christina Carreira / Anthony Ponomarenko	Ice dance	Igor Shpilband, Pasquale Camerlengo, Adrienne Lenda & Natalia Deller	Scott Moir	
February 26, 2021	(Russia) Alina Pepeleva / Roman Pleshkov	Pairs	Vladislav Zhovnirski, Arina Ushakova & Filip Tarasov	Nina Mozer	
March 2, 2021	(Lithuania) Allison Reed / Saulius Ambrulevičius	Ice dance	Romain Haguenauer & Maurizio Margaglio	Marie-France Dubreuil & Patrice Lauzon	
March 3, 2021	(Russia) Alena Kostornaia	Ladies	Evgeni Plushenko & Sergei Rozanov	Eteri Tutberidze, Sergei Dudakov & Daniil Gleikhengauz	
March 9, 2021	(United States) Hanna Harrell	Ladies	Alexei Letov & Olga Ganicheva	Misha Ge & Jun Ge	
March 9, 2021	(France) Adelina Galyavieva / Louis Thauron	Ice dance	Anjelika Krylova	Barbara Fusar-Poli, Roberto Pelizzola & Anjelika Krylova	
March 20, 2021	(China) Jin Boyang	Men	Xu Zhaoxiao & Fu Caishu	Xu Zhaoxiao, Fu Caishu, Brian Orser & Tracy Wilson	
March 20, 2021	(Poland) Ekaterina Kurakova	Ladies	Brian Orser & Tracy Wilson	Lorenzo Magri, Brian Orser & Tracy Wilson	
April 8, 2021	(Japan) Shingo Nishiyama	Ice dance	Andrew Hallam, Tracy Wilson, Joey Russell & Rie Arikawa	Igor Shpilband	
April 10, 2021	(Germany) Denis Gurdzhi	Men	Julia Gnilozubova	Lorenzo Magri	
April 13, 2021	(Russia) Artem Kovalev	Men	Alexander Volkov, Evgeni Plushenko & Martine Dagenais	Alexander Volkov	
April 15, 2021	(Russia) Kseniia Akhanteva / Valerii Kolesov	Pairs	Ludmila Velikova, Nikolai Velikov, Vasilii Velikov & Denis Lunin	Fedor Klimov	
April 15, 2021	(Russia) Polina Kostiukovich / Aleksei Briukhanov	Pairs	Ludmila Velikova, Nikolai Velikov & Vasilii Velikov	Arina Ushakova, Vladislav Zhovnirski & Andrei Filonov	
April 27, 2021	(Russia) Evgenia Tarasova / Vladimir Morozov	Pairs	Marina Zoueva, Maxim Trankov & Sergei Voronov	Eteri Tutberidze & Maxim Trankov	
April 29, 2021	(Russia) Alena Kanysheva / Andrei Pylin	Ice dance	Denis Samokhin, Maria Borovikova & Nikita Nazarov	Ksenia Rumyantseva & Ekaterina Volobueva	
May 1, 2021	(Russia) Alexandra Trusova	Ladies	Evgeni Plushenko, Dmitri Mikhailov & Sergei Rozanov	Eteri Tutberidze, Sergei Dudakov & Daniil Gleikhengauz	
May 21, 2021	(France) Julia Wagret / Pierre Souquet-Basiege	Ice dance	Alper Uçar, John Kerr & Nadine Kerr	Alexander Zhulin, Petr Durnev, Sergei Petukhov, Dmitri Ionov, Alper Uçar & John Kerr	
May 25, 2021	(Russia) Yasmina Kadyrova / Ivan Balchenko	Pairs	Pavel Sliusarenko & Valentina Tiukova	Tamara Moskvina & Artur Minchuk	
June 7, 2021	(Hungary) Ivett Tóth	Ladies	Zsófia Tokaji-Kulcsár & Zoltán Tóth	Ivana Reitmayerová	
June 11, 2021	(Switzerland) Alexia Paganini	Ladies	Stéphane Lambiel	Gheorghe Chiper	
June 16, 2021	(Canada) Haley Sales / Nikolas Wamsteeker	Ice dance	Megan Wing & Aaron Lowe	Scott Moir	
June 26, 2021	(United States) Danny O'Shea	Pairs	Jim Peterson & Amanda Evora	Todd Sand & Jenni Meno	

=== Nationality changes ===
Date	Skater(s)	Disc.	From	To	Notes	Ref.
August 28, 2020	Richard Kam	Ice dance	South Korea	New Zealand	Partnering with Charlotte Lafond-Fournier	
September 15, 2020	Alisa Efimova	Pairs	Russia	Germany	Partnering with Ruben Blommaert	
October 22, 2020	Jessica Pfund / Joshua Santillan	Pairs	United States	Switzerland		
December 1, 2020	Clare Seo	Ladies	South Korea	United States		
December 3, 2020	Anastasiia Metelkina	Pairs	Russia	Georgia	Partnering with Daniil Parkman	
December 3, 2020	Daniil Parkman	Pairs	Belarus	Georgia	Partnering with Anastasiia Metelkina	
December 24, 2020	Marco Zandron	Pairs	Italy	Spain	Partnering with Laura Barquero	
January 3, 2021	Solène Mazingue	Ice dance	France	Estonia	Partnering with Marko Jevgeni Gaidajenko	
January 11, 2021	Nika Osipova	Pairs	Russia	Netherlands	Partnering with Dmitry Epstein	
January 24, 2021	Tomás Llorenç Guarino Sabaté	Men	Switzerland	Spain		
January 30, 2021	Mariia Ignateva	Ice dance	Russia	Hungary	Partnering with Danijil Szemko	
April 21, 2021	Vanessa James	Pairs	France	Canada	Partnering with Eric Radford	
May 18, 2021	Vladimir Samoilov	Men	Russia	Poland		
May 27, 2021	Egor Murashov	Men	Russia	Switzerland		
June 6, 2021	Marie-Jade Lauriault / Romain Le Gac	Ice dance	France	Canada		
June 11, 2021	Aljona Savchenko	Pairs	Germany	United States	Partnering with TJ Nyman	
June 26, 2021	Chelsea Liu	Pairs	China	United States	Partnering with Danny O'Shea	

== Competitions ==
Scheduled competitions:

Code key

- S – Senior event
- J – Junior event
- N – Novice event
- M – Men's singles
- L – Ladies' singles
- P – Pair skating
- D – Ice dance

Color key

- ISU Championships
- Grand Prix or Junior Grand Prix
- Challenger Series
- Other competition

2020–2021
Dates	Event	Type	Level	Disc.	Location	Results
September 23–26	Nebelhorn Trophy	Challenger	Senior	All	Oberstdorf, Germany	Details
October 3	Japan Open (Note: This competition featured two teams composed entirely of Japanese skaters rather than the traditional three teams drawn from their respective regions (Europe, Japan, and North America).)	Other	S/J	M/L	Saitama, Japan	Details
October 15–17	Budapest Trophy	Challenger	Senior	M/L/D	Budapest, Hungary	Details
October 15–17	Budapest Trophy	Other	Junior	M/L/D	Budapest, Hungary	Details
October 23–25	Skate America	Grand Prix	Senior	All	Las Vegas, Nevada, United States	Details
October 29 – November 1	Ice Star	Other	All	All	Minsk, Belarus	Details
November 6–8	Cup of China	Grand Prix	Senior	All	Chongqing, China	Details
November 6–8	Volvo Open Cup	Other	All	M/L	Riga, Latvia	Details
November 20–22	Rostelecom Cup	Grand Prix	Senior	All	Moscow, Russia	Details
November 26–29	NRW Autumn Trophy	Other	S/J	All	Dortmund, Germany	Details
November 26–29	Santa Claus Cup	Other	All	M/L/D	Budapest, Hungary	Details
November 27–29	NHK Trophy	Grand Prix	Senior	M/L/D	Osaka, Japan	Details
December 11–13	Winter Star	Other	S/J	All	Minsk, Belarus	Details
February 6–7	Egna Dance Trophy	Other	S/J	D	Egna, Italy	Details
February 10–13	LuMi Dance Trophy	Other	All	D	Odesa, Ukraine	Details
February 12–14	Celje Open	Other	Senior	M/L	Celje, Slovenia	Details
February 18–21	Tallink Hotels Cup	Other	S/J	M/L	Tallinn, Estonia	Details
February 25–28	International Challenge Cup	Other	Senior	All	The Hague, Netherlands	Details
February 26 – March 3	Sofia Trophy	Other	All	M/L	Sofia, Bulgaria	Details
March 22–28	World Championships	Championships	Senior	All	Stockholm, Sweden	Details
April 1–3	Spring Talents Cup Ukraine	Other	Senior	L	Brovary, Ukraine	Details
April 1–3	Spring Talents Cup Ukraine	Other	J/N	M/L	Brovary, Ukraine	Details
April 8–11	Spring Star	Other	S/J	All	Minsk, Belarus	Details
April 14–18	Skate Helena	Other	Senior	L	Belgrade, Serbia	Details
April 14–18	Skate Helena	Other	J/N	M/L	Belgrade, Serbia	Details
April 15–18	World Team Trophy	Other	Senior	All	Osaka, Japan	Details
April 29 – May 2	Egna Spring Trophy	Other	All	M/L	Egna, Italy	Details

=== Cancelled events ===
Numerous competitions were cancelled by either the ISU, the host federation, or the local government due to the COVID-19 pandemic.

The 2021 Winter Universiade and the 2021 European Youth Olympic Winter Festival, originally scheduled for January 21–31, 2021, and February 6–13, 2021, respectively, were both postponed to the following season.

2020–2021
Dates	Event	Type	Location	Ref.
August 26–30	JGP Canada	Grand Prix	Richmond, British Columbia, Canada	
September 2–5	JGP Slovakia	Grand Prix	Košice, Slovakia	
September 9–10	JGP Hungary	Grand Prix	Budapest, Hungary	
September 9–13	Asian Open Trophy	Challenger	Beijing, China	
September 16–19	Nepela Memorial	Challenger	Bratislava, Slovakia	
September 16–19	JGP Japan	Grand Prix	Shin-Yokohama, Japan	
September 17–19	Autumn Classic International	Challenger	Oakville, Ontario, Canada	
September 23–26	JGP Czech Republic	Grand Prix	Ostrava, Czech Republic	
September 26	Tayside Trophy	Other	Dundee, Scotland, United Kingdom	
September 30 – October 3	JGP Uzbekistan	Grand Prix	Tashkent, Uzbekistan	
October 7–10	JGP Slovenia	Grand Prix	Ljubljana, Slovenia	
October 8–11	Finlandia Trophy	Challenger	Espoo, Finland	
October 9–10	Trophée Métropole Nice Côte d'Azur	Other	Nice, France	
October 14–17	JGP Latvia	Grand Prix	Riga, Latvia	
October 21–24	Crystal Skate of Romania	Other	Bucharest, Romania	
October 29–31	Autumn Talents Cup Ukraine	Other	Kyiv, Ukraine	
October 29 – November 1	Denis Ten Memorial Challenge	Challenger	Almaty, Kazakhstan	
October 30 – November 1	Skate Canada International	Grand Prix	Ottawa, Ontario, Canada	
November 6–8	Icelab International Cup	Other	Bergamo, Italy	
November 6–8	Pavel Roman Memorial	Other	Olomouc, Czech Republic	
November 6–8	Prague Ice Cup	Other	Prague, Czech Republic	
November 10–15	Denkova-Staviski Cup	Other	Sofia, Bulgaria	
November 12–15	Warsaw Cup	Challenger	Warsaw, Poland	
November 13–15	Internationaux de France	Grand Prix	Grenoble, France	
November 18–22	Open d'Andorra	Other	Canillo, Andorra	
November 25–28	Cup of Tyrol	Challenger	Innsbruck, Austria	
December 2–5	Golden Spin of Zagreb	Challenger	Zagreb, Croatia	
December 10–13	Grand Prix Final	Grand Prix	Beijing, China	
December 10–13	Christmas Magic Cup	Other	Bucharest, Romania	
December 11–13	Grand Prix of Bratislava	Other	Bratislava, Slovakia	
December 11–13	Latvian Trophy	Other	Mārupe, Latvia	
December 18–20	Sarajevo Open	Other	Sarajevo, Bosnia and Herzegovina	
January 5–10	Mentor Toruń Cup	Other	Toruń, Poland	
January 13–17	EduSport Trophy	Other	Bucharest, Romania	
January 25–31	European Championships	Championship	Zagreb, Croatia	
January 25–31	Bavarian Open	Other	Oberstdorf, Germany	
January 29–31	Reykjavik International Games	Other	Reykjavík, Iceland	
February 3–7	Nordic Championships	Other	Copenhagen, Denmark	
February 4–7	Dragon Trophy & Tivoli Cup	Other	Ljubljana, Slovenia	
February 8–14	Four Continents Championships	Championship	Sydney, Australia	
February 12–14	Jégvirág Cup	Other	Miskolc, Hungary	
February 25–28	Bellu Memorial	Other	Bucharest, Romania	
March 1–7	World Junior Championships	Championship	Harbin, China	
March 11–14	Tirnavia Ice Cup	Other	Trnava, Slovakia	
March 12–14	Coupe du Printemps	Other	Kockelscheuer, Luxembourg	
March 18–21	Skate Celje	Other	Celje, Slovenia	
March 26–27	Abu Dhabi Classic Trophy	Other	Abu Dhabi, United Arab Emirates	
April 7–11	Black Sea Ice Cup	Other	Kranevo, Bulgaria	
April 7–11	Triglav Trophy & Narcisa Cup	Other	Jesenice, Slovenia	
April 17–18	Kurbada Cup	Other	Riga, Latvia	
May 14–16	Uzbekistan Open	Other	Tashkent, Uzbekistan	

== International medalists ==
=== Men's singles ===
Championships
Competition	Gold	Silver	Bronze	Results
(Sweden) World Championships	(United States) Nathan Chen	(Japan) Yuma Kagiyama	(Japan) Yuzuru Hanyu	Details

Grand Prix
Competition	Gold	Silver	Bronze	Results
(United States) Skate America	(United States) Nathan Chen	(United States) Vincent Zhou	(Canada) Keegan Messing	Details
Cup of China	(China) Jin Boyang	(China) Yan Han	(China) Chen Yudong	Details
(Russia) Rostelecom Cup	(Russia) Mikhail Kolyada	(Georgia (country)) Morisi Kvitelashvili	(Russia) Petr Gumennik	Details
(Japan) NHK Trophy	(Japan) Yuma Kagiyama	(Japan) Kazuki Tomono	(Japan) Lucas Tsuyoshi Honda	Details

Challenger Series
Competition	Gold	Silver	Bronze	Results
(Germany) Nebelhorn Trophy	(Latvia) Deniss Vasiļjevs	(Italy) Gabriele Frangipani	(Sweden) Nikolaj Majorov	Details
(Hungary) Budapest Trophy	(Italy) Daniel Grassl	(Turkey) Burak Demirboğa	(Estonia) Aleksandr Selevko	Details

Other international competitions
Competition	Gold	Silver	Bronze	Results
(Belarus) Ice Star	(Russia) Mikhail Kolyada	(Belarus) Konstantin Milyukov	(Russia) Evgeni Semenenko	Details
(Germany) NRW Autumn Trophy	(Croatia) Jari Kessler	(Germany) Paul Fentz	(Switzerland) Lukas Britschgi	Details
(Hungary) Santa Claus Cup	(Hungary) András Csernoch	(Czech Republic) Jiří Bělohradský	(Spain) Iker Oyarzábal	Details
(Belarus) Winter Star	(France) Kévin Aymoz	(Belarus) Konstantin Milyukov	(Spain) Arnau Joly	Details
(Slovenia) Celje Open	(Hungary) András Csernoch	(Hungary) Máté Böröcz	No other competitors	Details
(Estonia) Tallink Hotels Cup	(Estonia) Aleksandr Selevko	(France) Romain Ponsart	(Bulgaria) Larry Loupolover	Details
(Netherlands) International Challenge Cup	(Russia) Mikhail Kolyada	(France) Romain Ponsart	(France) Adam Siao Him Fa	Details
(Bulgaria) Sofia Trophy	(Bulgaria) Larry Loupolover	(Monaco) Davide Lewton Brain	(Kazakhstan) Mikhail Shaidorov	Details
(Belarus) Spring Star	(Belarus) Konstantin Milyukov	(Belarus) Alexander Lebedev	No other competitors	Details
(Italy) Egna Spring Trophy	(Italy) Gabriele Frangipani	(Italy) Alessandro Fadini	(Spain) Tomàs-Llorenç Guarino Sabaté	Details

=== Ladies' singles ===
Championships
Competition	Gold	Silver	Bronze	Results
(Sweden) World Championships	FSR Anna Shcherbakova	FSR Elizaveta Tuktamysheva	FSR Alexandra Trusova	Details

Grand Prix
Competition	Gold	Silver	Bronze	Results
(United States) Skate America	(United States) Mariah Bell	(United States) Bradie Tennell	(United States) Audrey Shin	Details
Cup of China	(China) Chen Hongyi	(China) Angel Li	(China) Jin Minzhi	Details
(Russia) Rostelecom Cup	(Russia) Elizaveta Tuktamysheva	(Russia) Alena Kostornaia	(Russia) Anastasiia Guliakova	Details
(Japan) NHK Trophy	(Japan) Kaori Sakamoto	(Japan) Wakaba Higuchi	(Japan) Rino Matsuike	Details

Challenger Series
Competition	Gold	Silver	Bronze	Results
(Germany) Nebelhorn Trophy	(Estonia) Eva-Lotta Kiibus	(Switzerland) Alexia Paganini	(Finland) Jenni Saarinen	Details
(Hungary) Budapest Trophy	(Belgium) Loena Hendrickx	(Estonia) Eva-Lotta Kiibus	(Bulgaria) Alexandra Feigin	Details

Other international competitions
Competition	Gold	Silver	Bronze	Results
(Belarus) Ice Star	(Belarus) Viktoriia Safonova	(Russia) Anastasiia Guliakova	(Russia) Sofia Samodurova	Details
(Latvia) Volvo Open Cup	(Latvia) Angelīna Kučvaļska	(Latvia) Anete Lāce	No other competitors	Details
(Germany) NRW Autumn Trophy	(Netherlands) Lindsay van Zundert	(Sweden) Josefin Taljegård	(Finland) Jenni Saarinen	Details
(Hungary) Santa Claus Cup	(Hungary) Júlia Láng	(Cyprus) Emilea Zingas	(Hungary) Ivett Tóth	Details
(Belarus) Winter Star	(Belarus) Viktoriia Safonova	(Netherlands) Lindsay van Zundert	(France) Maïa Mazzara	Details
(Slovenia) Celje Open	(Netherlands) Lindsay van Zundert	(Slovenia) Daša Grm	(Hungary) Regina Schermann	Details
(Estonia) Tallink Hotels Cup	(Estonia) Eva-Lotta Kiibus	(Austria) Olga Mikutina	(Sweden) Josefin Taljegård	Details
(Netherlands) International Challenge Cup	(Belgium) Loena Hendrickx	(Chinese Taipei) Emmy Ma	(Cyprus) Emilea Zingas	Details
(Bulgaria) Sofia Trophy	(Austria) Olga Mikutina	(Bulgaria) Alexandra Feigin	(Sweden) Anita Östlund	Details
Spring Talents Cup Ukraine	(Ukraine) Yelizaveta Babenko	(Serbia) Antonina Dubinina	(Ukraine) Mariia Andriichuk	Details
(Belarus) Spring Star	(Belarus) Viktoriia Safonova	(Belarus) Aliaksandra Chepeleva	No other competitors	Details
(Serbia) Skate Helena	(Serbia) Antonina Dubinina	(Bulgaria) Kristina Grigorova	(Greece) Dimitra Korri	Details
(Italy) Egna Spring Trophy	(Italy) Lucrezia Beccari	(Italy) Roberta Rodeghiero	(Slovenia) Daša Grm	Details

=== Pairs ===
Championships
Competition	Gold	Silver	Bronze	Results
(Sweden) World Championships	FSR Anastasia Mishina / Aleksandr Galliamov	(China) Sui Wenjing / Han Cong	FSR Aleksandra Boikova / Dmitrii Kozlovskii	Details

Grand Prix
Competition	Gold	Silver	Bronze	Results
(United States) Skate America	(United States) Alexa Scimeca Knierim / Brandon Frazier	(United States) Jessica Calalang / Brian Johnson	(United States) Audrey Lu / Misha Mitrofanov	Details
Cup of China	(China) Peng Cheng / Jin Yang	(China) Wang Yuchen / Huang Yihang	(China) Zhu Daizifei / Liu Yuhang	Details
(Russia) Rostelecom Cup	(Russia) Aleksandra Boikova / Dmitrii Kozlovskii	(Russia) Anastasia Mishina / Aleksandr Galliamov	(Russia) Apollinariia Panfilova / Dmitry Rylov	Details
(Japan) NHK Trophy	No pairs competition			

Challenger Series
Competition	Gold	Silver	Bronze	Results
(Germany) Nebelhorn Trophy	(Italy) Rebecca Ghilardi / Filippo Ambrosini	(Germany) Annika Hocke / Robert Kunkel	(France) Cléo Hamon / Denys Strekalin	Details

Other international competitions
Competition	Gold	Silver	Bronze	Results
(Belarus) Ice Star	(Belarus) Bogdana Lukashevich / Alexander Stepanov	No other competitors		Details
(Germany) NRW Autumn Trophy	(Germany) Annika Hocke / Robert Kunkel	(Germany) Minerva Fabienne Hase / Nolan Seegert	(Netherlands) Daria Danilova / Michel Tsiba	Details
(Belarus) Winter Star	(Belarus) Bogdana Lukashevich / Alexander Stepanov	No other competitors		Details
(Netherlands) International Challenge Cup	(Russia) Evgenia Tarasova / Vladimir Morozov	(Germany) Annika Hocke / Robert Kunkel	(Hungary) Ioulia Chtchetinina / Márk Magyar	Details
(Belarus) Spring Star	(Belarus) Bogdana Lukashevich / Alexander Stepanov	No other competitors		Details

=== Ice dance ===
Championships
Competition	Gold	Silver	Bronze	Results
(Sweden) World Championships	FSR Victoria Sinitsina / Nikita Katsalapov	(United States) Madison Hubbell / Zachary Donohue	(Canada) Piper Gilles / Paul Poirier	Details

Grand Prix
Competition	Gold	Silver	Bronze	Results
(United States) Skate America	(United States) Madison Hubbell / Zachary Donohue	(United States) Kaitlin Hawayek / Jean-Luc Baker	(United States) Christina Carreira / Anthony Ponomarenko	Details
Cup of China	(China) Wang Shiyue / Liu Xinyu	(China) Chen Hong / Sun Zhuoming	(China) Ning Wanqi / Wang Chao	Details
(Russia) Rostelecom Cup	(Russia) Victoria Sinitsina / Nikita Katsalapov	(Russia) Tiffany Zahorski / Jonathan Guerreiro	(Russia) Anastasia Skoptsova / Kirill Aleshin	Details
(Japan) NHK Trophy	(Japan) Misato Komatsubara / Tim Koleto	(Japan) Rikako Fukase / Eichu Cho	(Japan) Kana Muramoto / Daisuke Takahashi	Details

Challenger Series
Competition	Gold	Silver	Bronze	Results
(Germany) Nebelhorn Trophy	(Czech Republic) Natálie Taschlerová / Filip Taschler	(United Kingdom) Sasha Fear / George Waddell	(Ukraine) Darya Popova / Volodymyr Byelikov	Details
(Hungary) Budapest Trophy	(Ukraine) Oleksandra Nazarova / Maxim Nikitin	(Germany) Katharina Müller / Tim Dieck	(United Kingdom) Sasha Fear / George Waddell	Details

Other international competitions
Competition	Gold	Silver	Bronze	Results
(Belarus) Ice Star	(Belarus) Viktoria Semenjuk / Ilya Yukhimuk	(Belarus) Karina Sidarenka / Maksim Yalenich	No other competitors	Details
(Germany) NRW Autumn Trophy	(Germany) Katharina Müller / Tim Dieck	(Switzerland) Fiona Pernas / German Shamraev	(Netherlands) Chelsea Verhaegh / Sherim van Geffen	Details
(Hungary) Santa Claus Cup	(Germany) Jennifer Janse van Rensburg / Benjamin Steffan	(Germany) Lara Luft / Maximilian Pfisterer	No other competitors	Details
(Belarus) Winter Star	(Ukraine) Darya Popova / Volodymyr Byelikov	(France) Julia Wagret / Pierre Souquet	(Belarus) Viktoria Semenjuk / Ilya Yukhimuk	Details
(Italy) Egna Dance Trophy	(Czech Republic) Natálie Taschlerová / Filip Taschler	(Germany) Jennifer Janse van Rensburg / Benjamin Steffan	(Italy) Carolina Moscheni / Francesco Fioretti	Details
(Ukraine) LuMi Dance Trophy	(Ukraine) Oleksandra Nazarova / Maxim Nikitin	(Belarus) Viktoria Semenjuk / Ilya Yukhimuk	(Turkey) Yuliia Zhata / Berk Akalın	Details
(Netherlands) International Challenge Cup	(France) Evgeniia Lopareva / Geoffrey Brissaud	(Hungary) Anna Yanovskaya / Ádám Lukács	(Netherlands) Chelsea Verhaegh / Sherim van Geffen	Details
(Belarus) Spring Star	(Belarus) Viktoria Semenjuk / Ilya Yukhimuk	(Belarus) Natallia Pazhyvilka / Ilya Drantusau	No other competitors	Details

== Season's best scores ==
=== Men's singles ===
Top 10 season's best scores in the men's combined total
No.	Skater	Nation	Score	Event
1	Nathan Chen	United States	320.88	2021 World Championships
2	Yuzuru Hanyu	Japan	300.88	2021 World Team Trophy
3	Yuma Kagiyama	Japan	291.77	2021 World Championships
4	Shoma Uno	Japan	277.44	2021 World Championships
5	Mikhail Kolyada	Russia	274.14	2021 World Team Trophy
6	Keegan Messing	Canada	270.26	2021 World Championships
7	Kévin Aymoz	France	263.82	2021 World Team Trophy
8	Jason Brown	United States	262.17	2021 World Championships
9	Evgeni Semenenko	Russia	258.45	2021 World Championships
10	Cha Jun-hwan	South Korea	245.99	2021 World Championships

Top 10 season's best scores in the men's short program
No.	Skater	Nation	Score	Event
1	Nathan Chen	United States	109.65	2021 World Team Trophy
2	Yuzuru Hanyu	Japan	107.12	2021 World Team Trophy
3	Yuma Kagiyama	Japan	100.96	2021 World Championships
4	Jason Brown	United States	94.86	2021 World Team Trophy
5	Kévin Aymoz	France	94.69	2021 World Team Trophy
6	Mikhail Kolyada	Russia	93.52	2021 World Championships
7	Keegan Messing	Canada	93.51	2021 World Championships
8	Shoma Uno	Japan	92.62	2021 World Championships
9	Cha Jun-hwan	South Korea	91.15	2021 World Championships
10	Roman Sadovsky	Canada	89.61	2021 World Team Trophy

Top 10 season's best scores in the men's free skating
No.	Skater	Nation	Score	Event
1	Nathan Chen	United States	222.03	2021 World Championships
2	Yuzuru Hanyu	Japan	193.76	2021 World Team Trophy
3	Yuma Kagiyama	Japan	190.81	2021 World Championships
4	Shoma Uno	Japan	184.82	2021 World Championships
5	Mikhail Kolyada	Russia	180.72	2021 World Team Trophy
6	Keegan Messing	Canada	176.75	2021 World Championships
7	Evgeni Semenenko	Russia	171.59	2021 World Championships
8	Jason Brown	United States	170.92	2021 World Championships
9	Kévin Aymoz	France	169.13	2021 World Team Trophy
10	Daniel Grassl	Italy	163.38	2021 World Championships

=== Ladies' singles ===
Top 10 season's best scores in the ladies' combined total
No.	Skater	Nation	Score	Event
1	Anna Shcherbakova	Russia	241.65	2021 World Team Trophy
2	Kaori Sakamoto	Japan	228.07	2021 World Team Trophy
3	Elizaveta Tuktamysheva	Russia	226.58	2021 World Team Trophy
4	Alexandra Trusova	Russia	217.20	2021 World Championships
5	Karen Chen	United States	208.63	2021 World Championships
6	Loena Hendrickx	Belgium	208.44	2021 World Championships
7	Rika Kihira	Japan	205.70	2021 World Championships
8	Bradie Tennell	United States	200.59	2021 World Team Trophy
9	Olga Mikutina	Austria	198.77	2021 World Championships
10	Lee Hae-in	South Korea	193.44	2021 World Championships

Top 10 season's best scores in the ladies' short program
No.	Skater	Nation	Score	Event
1	Anna Shcherbakova	Russia	81.07	2021 World Team Trophy
2	Elizaveta Tuktamysheva	Russia	80.35	2021 World Team Trophy
3	Rika Kihira	Japan	79.08	2021 World Championships
4	Kaori Sakamoto	Japan	77.78	2021 World Team Trophy
5	Karen Chen	United States	74.40	2021 World Championships
6	Kim Ye-lim	South Korea	73.63	2021 World Championships
7	Loena Hendrickx	Belgium	72.18	2020 Budapest Trophy
8	Bradie Tennell	United States	69.87	2021 World Championships
9	Lee Hae-in	South Korea	68.94	2021 World Championships
10	Madeline Schizas	Canada	68.77	2021 World Championships

Top 10 season's best scores in the ladies' free skating
No.	Skater	Nation	Score	Event
1	Anna Shcherbakova	Russia	160.58	2021 World Team Trophy
2	Alexandra Trusova	Russia	152.38	2021 World Championships
3	Kaori Sakamoto	Japan	150.29	2021 World Team Trophy
4	Elizaveta Tuktamysheva	Russia	146.23	2021 World Team Trophy
5	Loena Hendrickx	Belgium	141.16	2021 World Championships
6	Karen Chen	United States	134.23	2021 World Championships
7	Bradie Tennell	United States	133.19	2021 World Team Trophy
8	Rika Kihira	Japan	132.39	2021 World Team Trophy
9	Olga Mikutina	Austria	131.59	2021 World Championships
10	Ekaterina Ryabova	Azerbaijan	125.35	2021 World Championships

=== Pairs ===
Top 10 season's best scores in the pairs' combined total
No.	Team	Nation	Score	Event
1	Anastasia Mishina / Aleksandr Galliamov	Russia	227.59	2021 World Championships
2	Sui Wenjing / Han Cong	China	225.71	2021 World Championships
3	Aleksandra Boikova / Dmitrii Kozlovskii	Russia	217.63	2021 World Championships
4	Evgenia Tarasova / Vladimir Morozov	Russia	212.76	2021 World Championships
5	Peng Cheng / Jin Yang	China	201.18	2021 World Championships
6	Alexa Knierim / Brandon Frazier	United States	199.31	2021 World Team Trophy
7	Riku Miura / Ryuichi Kihara	Japan	196.65	2021 World Team Trophy
8	Kirsten Moore-Towers / Michael Marinaro	Canada	195.29	2021 World Championships
9	Nicole Della Monica / Matteo Guarise	Italy	194.33	2021 World Team Trophy
10	Ashley Cain-Gribble / Timothy LeDuc	United States	185.31	2021 World Championships

Top 10 season's best scores in the pairs' short program
No.	Team	Nation	Score	Event
1	Aleksandra Boikova / Dmitrii Kozlovskii	Russia	80.16	2021 World Championships
2	Sui Wenjing / Han Cong	China	77.62	2021 World Championships
3	Anastasia Mishina / Aleksandr Galliamov	Russia	75.79	2021 World Championships
4	Evgenia Tarasova / Vladimir Morozov	Russia	71.46	2021 World Championships
5	Peng Cheng / Jin Yang	China	71.32	2021 World Championships
6	Nicole Della Monica / Matteo Guarise	Italy	66.09	2021 World Team Trophy
7	Riku Miura / Ryuichi Kihara	Japan	65.82	2021 World Team Trophy
8	Alexa Knierim / Brandon Frazier	United States	65.68	2021 World Team Trophy
9	Ashley Cain-Gribble / Timothy LeDuc	United States	64.94	2021 World Championships
10	Miriam Ziegler / Severin Kiefer	Austria	64.01	2021 World Championships

Top 10 season's best scores in the pairs' free skating
No.	Team	Nation	Score	Event
1	Anastasia Mishina / Aleksandr Galliamov	Russia	151.80	2021 World Championships
2	Sui Wenjing / Han Cong	China	148.09	2021 World Championships
3	Evgenia Tarasova / Vladimir Morozov	Russia	141.30	2021 World Championships
4	Aleksandra Boikova / Dmitrii Kozlovskii	Russia	137.47	2021 World Championships
5	Alexa Knierim / Brandon Frazier	United States	133.63	2021 World Team Trophy
6	Kirsten Moore-Towers / Michael Marinaro	Canada	131.84	2021 World Championships
7	Riku Miura / Ryuichi Kihara	Japan	130.83	2021 World Team Trophy
8	Peng Cheng / Jin Yang	China	129.86	2021 World Championships
9	Nicole Della Monica / Matteo Guarise	Italy	128.24	2021 World Team Trophy
10	Ashley Cain-Gribble / Timothy LeDuc	United States	120.37	2021 World Championships

=== Ice dance ===
Top 10 season's best scores in the combined total (ice dance)
No.	Team	Nation	Score	Event
1	Victoria Sinitsina / Nikita Katsalapov	Russia	221.17	2021 World Championships
2	Madison Hubbell / Zachary Donohue	United States	214.71	2021 World Championships
3	Piper Gilles / Paul Poirier	Canada	214.35	2021 World Championships
4	Madison Chock / Evan Bates	United States	212.69	2021 World Championships
5	Alexandra Stepanova / Ivan Bukin	Russia	208.77	2021 World Championships
6	Charlène Guignard / Marco Fabbri	Italy	207.68	2021 World Team Trophy
7	Lilah Fear / Lewis Gibson	Great Britain	196.92	2021 World Championships
8	Laurence Fournier Beaudry / Nikolaj Sørensen	Canada	196.88	2021 World Championships
9	Kaitlin Hawayek / Jean-Luc Baker	United States	188.51	2021 World Championships
10	Tiffany Zahorski / Jonathan Guerreiro	Russia	188.45	2021 World Championships

Top 10 season's best scores in the rhythm dance
No.	Team	Nation	Score	Event
1	Victoria Sinitsina / Nikita Katsalapov	Russia	88.15	2021 World Championships
2	Madison Hubbell / Zachary Donohue	United States	86.05	2021 World Championships
3	Madison Chock / Evan Bates	United States	85.15	2021 World Championships
4	Piper Gilles / Paul Poirier	Canada	83.37	2021 World Championships
5	Alexandra Stepanova / Ivan Bukin	Russia	83.02	2021 World Championships
6	Charlène Guignard / Marco Fabbri	Italy	82.93	2021 World Team Trophy
7	Laurence Fournier Beaudry / Nikolaj Sørensen	Canada	77.87	2021 World Championships
8	Lilah Fear / Lewis Gibson	Great Britain	77.42	2021 World Championships
9	Kaitlin Hawayek / Jean-Luc Baker	United States	76.79	2021 World Team Trophy
10	Natalia Kaliszek / Maksym Spodyriev	Poland	76.12	2021 World Championships

Top 10 season's best scores in the free dance
No.	Team	Nation	Score	Event
1	Victoria Sinitsina / Nikita Katsalapov	Russia	133.02	2021 World Championships
2	Piper Gilles / Paul Poirier	Canada	130.98	2021 World Championships
3	Madison Hubbell / Zachary Donohue	United States	128.66	2021 World Championships
4	Madison Chock / Evan Bates	United States	127.54	2021 World Championships
5	Alexandra Stepanova / Ivan Bukin	Russia	125.75	2021 World Championships
6	Charlène Guignard / Marco Fabbri	Italy	124.75	2021 World Team Trophy
7	Lilah Fear / Lewis Gibson	Great Britain	119.50	2021 World Championships
8	Laurence Fournier Beaudry / Nikolaj Sørensen	Canada	119.01	2021 World Championships
9	Kaitlin Hawayek / Jean-Luc Baker	United States	113.43	2021 World Championships
10	Tiffany Zahorski / Jonathan Guerreiro	Russia	112.87	2021 World Championships

== World standings ==
=== Men's singles ===
As of March 27, 2021.

No.	Skater	Nation
1	Nathan Chen	United States
2	Yuzuru Hanyu	Japan
3	Shoma Uno	Japan
4	Jason Brown	United States
5	Alexander Samarin	Russia
6	Dmitri Aliev	Russia
7	Matteo Rizzo	Italy
8	Keegan Messing	Canada
9	Cha Jun-hwan	South Korea
10	Morisi Kvitelashvili	Georgia

=== Ladies' singles ===
As of March 26, 2021.

No.	Skater	Nation
1	Rika Kihira	Japan
2	Anna Shcherbakova	Russia
3	Elizaveta Tuktamysheva	Russia
4	Alexandra Trusova	Russia
5	Bradie Tennell	United States
6	Kaori Sakamoto	Japan
7	Satoko Miyahara	Japan
8	Alena Kostornaia	Russia
9	Alina Zagitova	Russia
10	Lim Eun-soo	South Korea

=== Pairs ===
As of March 25, 2021.

No.	Skater	Nation
1	Peng Cheng / Jin Yang	China
2	Aleksandra Boikova / Dmitrii Kozlovskii	Russia
3	Anastasia Mishina / Aleksandr Galliamov	Russia
4	Evgenia Tarasova / Vladimir Morozov	Russia
5	Kirsten Moore-Towers / Michael Marinaro	Canada
6	Sui Wenjing / Han Cong	China
7	Ashley Cain-Gribble / Timothy LeDuc	United States
8	Daria Pavliuchenko / Denis Khodykin	Russia
9	Miriam Ziegler / Severin Kiefer	Austria
10	Nicole Della Monica / Matteo Guarise	Italy

=== Ice dance ===
As of March 27, 2021.

No.	Skater	Nation
1	Victoria Sinitsina / Nikita Katsalapov	Russia
2	Madison Hubbell / Zachary Donohue	United States
3	Piper Gilles / Paul Poirier	Canada
4	Charlène Guignard / Marco Fabbri	Italy
5	Madison Chock / Evan Bates	United States
6	Alexandra Stepanova / Ivan Bukin	Russia
7	Gabriella Papadakis / Guillaume Cizeron	France
8	Lilah Fear / Lewis Gibson	Great Britain
9	Wang Shiyue / Liu Xinyu	China
10	Sara Hurtado / Kirill Khaliavin	Spain
