= 2021 European Figure Skating Championships =

- Type: ISU Championship
- Date: 25 – 31 January
- Season: 2020–21
- Location: Zagreb, Croatia
- Host: Croatian Skating Federation
- Venue: Arena Zagreb
- Previous: 2020 European Championships
- Next: 2022 European Championships

The 2021 European Figure Skating Championships were scheduled to be held from 25 to 31 January 2021 at the Arena Zagreb in Zagreb, Croatia. Medals would have been awarded in men's singles, ladies' singles, pair skating, and ice dance.

Zagreb was announced as the host in June 2018. The competition was cancelled by the International Skating Union on 10 December 2020, due to the impact of the COVID-19 pandemic. This was the first time since World War II that the European Championships were not held.

== Impact of the COVID-19 pandemic ==
The Arena Zagreb began housing COVID-19 patients in November 2020 after the COVID-19 pandemic in Croatia worsened. Although the ISU considered postponing and/or relocating the event, the competition was ultimately cancelled on 10 December. It was the third ISU Championship event of the season to be cancelled, following the 2021 Four Continents Championships and the 2021 World Junior Championships.

On 11 December, Figure Skating Federation of Russia (FFKKR) president Alexander Gorshkov announced FFKKR's intention to organize and hold an alternative event to the European Championships.

== Qualification ==
The competition was to be open to skaters from all European member nations of the International Skating Union. The corresponding competition for non-European skaters would have been the 2021 Four Continents Championships, although it was cancelled in October 2020.

Skaters would have been eligible for the 2021 European Championships if they had turned 15 years of age before 1 July 2020 and met the minimum technical elements score requirements.

Based on the results of the 2020 European Championships, each qualifying ISU member nation could field one to three entries per discipline.

Number of entries per discipline
Spots	Men	Women	Pairs	Ice dance
3	Italy; Russia	Russia	Germany; Italy; Russia	Russia
2	Azerbaijan; Czech Republic; Georgia; Germany; Israel; Latvia	Azerbaijan; Estonia; Finland; France; Italy; Poland; Switzerland	Austria; France; Hungary	France; Great Britain; Italy; Poland; Spain; Ukraine

== Entries ==
Member nations began announcing their selections in December 2020. The event was cancelled on 10 December.

Country	Men	Ladies	Pairs	Ice dance
Denmark		Maia Sørensen		
Great Britain	Peter James Hallam	Natasha McKay		Lilah Fear / Lewis Gibson; Sasha Fear / George Waddell
Ireland	Samuel McAllister			
