= 2020–21 Grand Prix of Figure Skating Final =

2020–21 Grand Prix Final
- Type: Grand Prix
- Season: 2020–21
- Location: Beijing, China
- Host: Chinese Skating Association
- Venue: Capital Indoor Stadium
- Previous: 2019–20 Grand Prix Final
- Next: 2021–22 Grand Prix Final
- Previous Grand Prix: 2020 NHK Trophy

The 2020–21 Grand Prix of Figure Skating Final was a planned figure skating competition sanctioned by the International Skating Union (ISU). It was scheduled to be hosted by the Chinese Skating Association in Beijing, China, from 10 to 13 December 2020, as the final event of the 2020–21 ISU Grand Prix of Figure Skating series. The senior final was scheduled for the same dates and city as the junior final. Medals would have been awarded in men's singles, women's singles, pair skating, and ice dance at the senior and junior levels, but the competition was cancelled because of the COVID-19 pandemic.

== Background ==
The ISU Grand Prix of Figure Skating is a series of seven events sanctioned by the International Skating Union (ISU) and held during the autumn: six qualifying events and the Grand Prix of Figure Skating Final. This allows skaters to perfect their programs earlier in the season, as well as compete against the skaters with whom they will later compete at the World Championships. Skaters accumulate points based on their placements in designated Grand Prix competitions, and the top point-winners qualify for the Grand Prix Final. Likewise, the ISU Junior Grand Prix of Figure Skating (JGP) is a junior-level series that consists of seven events culminating in the Junior Grand Prix Final. A points system based on placements determines the top six skaters or teams in each discipline who qualify for the Junior Grand Prix of Figure Skating Final.

On 9 July 2020, the General Administration of Sport of China announced that no international sporting events would be held in China in 2020 except for test events for the 2022 Winter Olympics. The Chinese Skating Association was scheduled to host several events during the season, including the 2020 Grand Prix Final. The Grand Prix Final, scheduled to be hosted in Beijing, was exempt from the government's ruling due to its status as the test event for the Olympic Games.

On 20 July, the ISU officially cancelled the Junior Grand Prix series due to travel and quarantine restrictions in place owing to the COVID-19 pandemic. On 4 August, the ISU confirmed that the Grand Prix series would proceed as scheduled during the fall, but each event would feature domestic skaters, skaters already training in the host nation, and skaters assigned to that event for geographic reasons in an effort to limit travel during the global pandemic.

On 30 September, the ISU announced the postponement of the 2020 Grand Prix Final, which had been scheduled for 10–13 December in Beijing. The ISU said logistical concerns raised by potential participants, including conflicts with year-end holidays and national championships and possible quarantine requirements after returning home, could affect participation.

On 13 November, an adapted sports testing program developed by the Beijing 2022 Organizing Committee, the International Olympic Committee (IOC), the International Paralympic Committee (IPC), and the international winter sports federations replaced all scheduled Beijing test events. Despite the ongoing pandemic, the ISU announced that it would evaluate the possibility of finding alternative locations outside of China to host the 2020 Grand Prix Final. On 10 December, the ISU announced the definitive cancellation of the Grand Prix Final, along with the 2021 European Figure Skating Championships, due to "the worsening worldwide Covid-19 pandemic situation and the consequent increasing risks for organizers and participants".
