= Sergey Kononykhin =

Soviet sports commentator

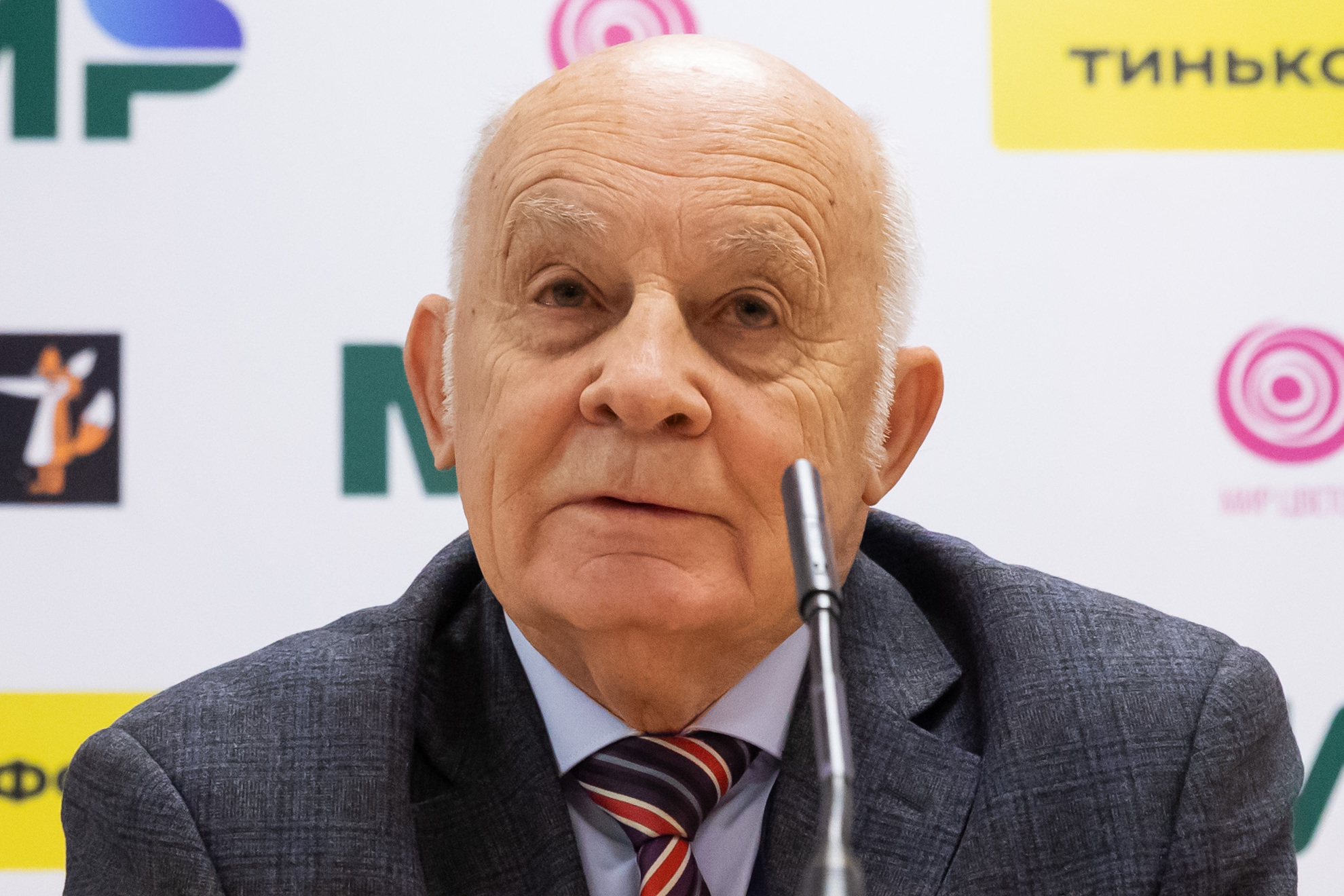
- Born: Sergey Nikolaevich Kononykhin; 1 September 1940 (age 86); Moscow, RSFSR, USSR
- Education: Moscow Aviation Institute
- Occupations: TV commentator, journalist, sports functionary

Sergey Nikolaevich Kononykhin (Russian: Сергей Николаевич Кононыхин; born 1 September 1940, Moscow) is a Soviet sports commentator (figure skating), a judge of figure skating competitions on skates. Master of Sports of the USSR in figure skating. Honored Worker of Culture of the Russian Federation.

== Biography ==
He graduated from the Moscow Aviation Institute, Academy of Social Sciences under the CPSU Central Committee.

He was judge of the international category. In this capacity he worked at the Winter Olympics of 1980 and 1988, World and European Championships (1974-1988).

He has been on television since 1967. He worked as an editor and commentator of the department of science, commentator of sports editorial staff of the Central Television and All-Union Radio. He was also the editor-in-chief of the Main Editorial Board of the Cinema Programs of the Central Television.

From 1992 to 1995 he was the director of the studio of sports programs of RGTRK Ostankino.

He has been vice-president of the Figure Skating Federation of Russia (since 4 June 2010), and a member of the Management Commission ISU.
