= 2021 Four Continents Figure Skating Championships =

2021 Four Continents Championships
- Type: ISU Championship
- Date: February 9 – 14
- Season: 2020–21

The 2021 Four Continents Figure Skating Championships were scheduled to be held from February 9–14, 2021 in Sydney, Australia. Held annually since 1999, the competition would have featured skaters from the Americas, Asia, Africa, and Oceania. Medals would have awarded in the disciplines of men's singles, ladies' singles, pair skating, and ice dance.

Sydney was announced as the host in June 2019. Following the cancellation of the event on October 16, 2020, the International Skating Union provisionally awarded Sydney the right to host the 2023 edition of the event. This would have been Australia's first time hosting the Four Continents, having last held an ISU Championship event in 1996.

== Impact of the COVID-19 pandemic ==
The Australian government closed the country's borders to non-citizens in March 2020 to prevent the spread of the pandemic and, as of the event's cancellation date, had not yet reopened them. In August 2020, Australia's flagship airline Qantas announced the suspension of all international flights through at least July 2021, making it unlikely for athletes to be able to travel to the competition if it were to be held.

On October 14, 2020, two days before the event's official cancellation, Ice Skating Australia announced the suspension of all ticket sales until further notice.

The ISU and various host federations had already cancelled several events earlier in the season, including the 2020–21 ISU Junior Grand Prix, several 2020–21 ISU Challenger Series events, and the 2020 Skate Canada International.

== Qualification ==
The competition was to be open to skaters from all non-European member nations of the International Skating Union. The corresponding competition for European skaters was scheduled to be the 2021 European Championships, before it was cancelled in December 2020.

Skaters would have been eligible for the 2021 Four Continents Championships if they turned 15 years of age before July 1, 2020 and met the minimum technical elements score requirements. The ISU accepts scores if they were obtained at senior-level ISU-recognized international competitions at least 21 days before the first official practice day of the championships.
