= 2020–21 ISU Junior Grand Prix =

- Type: ISU Junior Grand Prix
- Season: 2020–21
- Previous: 2019–20 ISU Junior Grand Prix
- Next: 2021–22 ISU Junior Grand Prix

The 2020–21 ISU Junior Grand Prix would have been a series of junior international competitions organized by the International Skating Union to be held from August 2020 through December 2020. It would have been the junior-level complement to the 2020–21 ISU Grand Prix of Figure Skating. On July 20, 2020, the ISU officially cancelled the JGP series due to the COVID-19 pandemic.

== Reactions to the COVID-19 pandemic ==
On May 1, 2020, the International Skating Union established a working group, chaired by ISU Vice-president for Figure Skating Alexander Lakernik, to monitor the ongoing COVID-19 pandemic. Its responsibilities included determining the feasibility of holding events as scheduled, possibly behind closed doors, during the first half of the 2020–21 season, and the financial impact of any potential cancellations. The ISU announced that a host federation must make a decision regarding potential cancellation of their event at latest twelve weeks prior to the event.

On May 16, 2020, the Slovak Figure Skating Association informed the ISU that it had cancelled all events that it was scheduled to host due to the ongoing pandemic, including the second event of the JGP series in Košice. On May 26, Skate Canada cancelled the first event of the JGP series that it was originally scheduled to host in Richmond, British Columbia. On July 3, the Japan Skating Federation cancelled its event in Shin-Yokohama, originally scheduled to be the fourth in the series.

The Japan Skating Federation announced on July 13 that it would not assign any skaters to the Junior Grand Prix, assuming the competitions proceeded as scheduled.

On July 13, the ISU announced major changes to the JGP format, including:

- No ISU Junior Grand Prix points would be awarded and no ISU Junior Grand Prix Ranking for 2020/21 would be established.
- There would be no pre-allocated entries for ISU members to participate in each Junior Grand Prix event and ISU members could choose the events in which they would enter their skaters.

On July 20, the ISU officially cancelled all events of the series, citing increased travel and entry requirements between countries and potentially excessive sanitary and health care costs for hosting members.

== Competitions ==
The locations of the JGP events change yearly. On May 16, 2020, the ISU announced that the Slovak Figure Skating Association had cancelled the second event of the series in Košice, Slovakia. Skate Canada cancelled their event on May 26. On July 3, the Japan Skating Federation cancelled its event.

On June 15, it was announced that a sixth event had been added after the previously-announced cancellations, to be hosted in Riga, Latvia.

The entire series was cancelled on July 20.

This season, the series would have been composed of the following events.

Date	Event
August 26–29	2020 JGP Canada
September 2–5	2020 JGP Slovakia
September 9–12	2020 JGP Hungary
September 16–19	2020 JGP Japan
September 23–26	2020 JGP Czech Republic
September 30 – October 3	2020 JGP Uzbekistan
October 7–10	2020 JGP Slovenia
October 14–17	2020 JGP Latvia
December 10–13	(China) 2020–21 JGP Final
