= Figure Skating Federation of Russia =

National governing body for figure skating

- Sport: Figure skating
- Jurisdiction: Russia
- Abbreviation: FFKK of Russia; FFKKR
- Founded: 1992
- Affiliation: International Skating Union
- Headquarters: Moscow
- President: Anton Sikharulidze
- Other key staff: Svetlana Bazhanova (general director)

Official website
- fsrussia.ru
- (Russia)

The Figure Skating Federation of Russia (Russian: Федерация фигурного катания на коньках России, romanized: Federatsiya figurnogo kataniya na konkakh Rossii, lit. 'Figure Skating on Skates Federation of Russia') is the national sport governing body for figure skating in Russia. It is recognized as such by the Russian Olympic Committee (ROC) and the International Skating Union (ISU). No individual membership exists, and its members are part of various regional ice sports associations. It was founded in 1992 as the successor of the Figure Skating Federation of the USSR (Soviet Union).

The goals of this governing body are: taking a plan of competitions by the calendar, developing a curriculum for figure skating in Russia, forming a national team, making contracts with sportsmen and coaches, international relations with other skating organizations, assistance to regional federations, organizing the Rostelecom Cup (formerly the Cup of Russia) and other important events. Since 2009, the main sponsor of the federation is Rostelecom. As of 2022, the federation's sponsors are also T-Bank, Mir, Liga Stavok and Channel One.

After the 2022 Russian invasion of Ukraine, the ISU suspended the participation of athletes from Russia in international events until further notice.

== Structure ==
The Russian Figure Skating Federation was headed until 2010 by its long-time president Valentin Piseev, who had also been the president of the Soviet Figure Skating Federation since 1989 until its dissolution in 1991. However, when he refused to nominate himself at the 2010 presidential election, Aleksandr Gorshkov, formerly a vice-president, was elected a new president on June 4, 2010, with Piseev becoming a general director. Anton Sikharulidze, who also registered as a presidential candidate, withdrew due to the changes in the Federation's constitution. Sikharulidze commented that "presidential powers are limited to representative functions" and the whole post turned nominal, so the real leadership belongs to general director, including the ability to sign financial documents and making sole decisions. Sikharulidze added he does not "want to become a president just to carry the general director's briefcase". Tatiana Tarasova, Piseev's usual opponent, approved the decision of making him the general director, stating that "not using his knowledge and international authority would be very wrong".

Since September 2014, the general director was Alexander Kogan.

In 2023, following the death of the incumbent president Aleksandr Gorshkov, Anton Sikharulidze became the acting president. In February 2025 he was elected as president.

Apart from the president, there are several vice presidents. As of 2006, the list of vice presidents included international judge Sergei Kononykhin, Aleksandr Lakernik, Oleg Nilov and Irina Raber. Irina Raber and Oleg Nilov head the largest regional federations, in Moscow and St. Petersburg. In 2010, Alexander Kogan was also elected as vice president.

At the end of September 2025, the general director is Svetlana Bazhanova.

The governing of the Figure Skating Federation of Russia is fulfilled by a conference that is held once in two years. All decisions during the conference are made through voting. Members who participate are chosen by regional figure skating federations. In intervals between conferences, the Federation is ruled by a presidium of 30 people.

=== Regional federations ===
The Figure Skating Federation of Russia is composed of 36 regional federations.

| No. | Название |
|---|---|
| 1 | Figure Skating Federation of Bashkortostan |
| 2 | Figure Skating Federation of Republic of Karelia |
| 3 | Figure Skating Federation of Republic of Mordovia |
| 4 | Skating Union of Tatarstan |
| 5 | Figure Skating Federation of Udmurt Republic |
| 6 | Figure Skating Federation of Krasnoyarsk Krai |
| 7 | Figure Skating Federation of Primorsky Krai |
| 8 | Figure Skating Federation of Arkhangelsk Oblast |
| 9 | Figure Skating Federation of Belgorod Oblast |
| 10 | Figure Skating Federation of Vladimir Oblast |
| 11 | Figure Skating Federation of Vologda Oblast |
| 12 | Figure Skating Federation of Voronezh Oblast |
| 13 | Figure Skating Federation of Kaliningrad Oblast |
| 14 | Olympic Orbit (Kirov) |
| 15 | Figure Skating Federation of Kurgan Oblast |
| 16 | Figure Skating Federation of Leningrad Oblast |
| 17 | Figure Skating Federation of Lipetsk Oblast |
| 18 | Figure Skating Federation of Moscow Oblast |
| 19 | Figure Skating Federation of Murmansk Oblast |
| 20 | Figure Skating and Short Track Federation (Nizhny Novgorod) |
| 21 | Figure Skating Federation of Novosibirsk Oblast |
| 22 | Figure Skating Assotiation of Omsk |
| 23 | Figure Skating Federation of Orenburg Oblast |
| 24 | Figure Skating Federation of Penza Oblast |
| 25 | Figure Skating Federation of Perm Krai |
| 26 | Figure Skating Federation of Rostov-on-Don |
| 27 | Figure Skating Federation of Ryazan Oblast |
| 28 | Figure Skating Federation of Samara Oblast |
| 29 | Figure Skating Federation of Saratov Oblast |
| 30 | Figure Skating Federation of Sverdlovsk Oblast |
| 31 | Figure Skating Federation of Tver Oblast |
| 32 | Figure Skating Federation of Chelyabinsk Oblast |
| 33 | Figure Skating Federation "Pirouette" of Chita and Chita Oblast |
| 34 | Figure Skating Federation of Yaroslavl Oblast |
| 35 | Figure Skating Federation of Moscow city |
| 36 | Figure Skating Federation of Saint Petersburg |
| 37 | All-Russia society of sports and physical training "Dinamo" |

== Competitions ==
- Annual Russian Championships
- Rostelecom Cup
- Russian Junior Championships
- Russian Cup (national championship selections, Russian: Кубок России)
- Belgorod Oblast Open Championships with Alexei Mishin prizes (in Belgorod)
- Nikolai Panin Memorial (St. Petersburg)
- Northern Lights (Arkhangelsk)
- Samarochka (Samara)
- Silver Skates (Tomsk)
- Zhuk Memorial
- Siberia and the Far East Open Championships
