= Japan Skating Federation =

Japanese sports governing body

- Sport: figure skating, speed skating, short track speed skating
- Abbreviation: 日本スケート連盟
- Founded: 1929
- President: Akihisa Nagashima
- Replaced: Seiko Ishizaki

Official website
- www.skatingjapan.or.jp
- (Japan)

The Japan Skating Federation (Japanese: 日本スケート連盟) is the sports governing body of Japan for figure skating, speed skating, and short track speed skating. It was founded in 1929. The current president (since 2019) is Akihisa Nagashima, a member of the House of Representatives of Japan.

== History ==
The arrival of skating in Japan happened around 1877 and is attributed to William P. Brooks. To learn about skating technique, Japanese skaters studied photographs, learned new elements from visiting foreigners, brought back knowledge of skating after trips abroad, and learned from books.

The Japanese Skating Association was formed by figure skating enthusiasts in the autumn of 1920. By 1921, it numbered more than 100 members. A few years later, in 1924, the Japanese Collegiate Ice Sports Federation was created. The Association joined the International Skating Union in 1926. The Japanese Skating Association and the Japanese Collegiate Ice Sports Federation jointly formed the modern Japan Skating Federation in 1929 and began running combined national championships early the next year.

The Federation first sent competitors to the Winter Olympic Games in 1932. Women began competing at the national championships in 1935.

Initially, the Federation governed ice hockey in addition to figure and speed skating. The Japan Ice Hockey Federation became an independent organization in 1972 because of the 1972 Winter Olympics held in Sapporo.
