= 2003–04 ISU World Standings =

Merit-based ice skating ranking

Season-end No. 1 skaters
- Men's singles: (Russia) Evgeni Plushenko
- Ladies' singles: (United States) Sasha Cohen
- Pairs: (China) Xue Shen / Hongbo Zhao
- Ice dance: (Bulgaria) Albena Denkova / Maxim Staviski

Navigation

The 2003–04 ISU World Standings, are the World Standings published by the International Skating Union (ISU) during the 2003–04 season.

The 2003–04 ISU World Standings for single & pair skating and ice dance, are taking into account results of the 2001–02, 2002–03 and 2003–04 seasons.

== World Standings for single & pair skating and ice dance ==
=== Season-end standings ===
The remainder of this section is a list, by discipline, published by the ISU.

==== Men's singles (30 skaters) ====
As of 25 March 2004

Rank	Nation	Skater	Points	Season	ISU Championships or Olympics	(Junior) Grand Prix and Final		Selected International Competition	
Rank	Nation	Skater	Points	Season	Best	Best	2nd Best	Best	2nd Best
1	RUS	Evgeni Plushenko	4875	2003/2004 season (100%)	1200	750	400	0	0
1	RUS	Evgeni Plushenko	4875	2002/2003 season (100%)	1200	800	400	0	0
1	RUS	Evgeni Plushenko	4875	2001/2002 season (70%)	805	525	280	0	0
2	FRA	Brian Joubert	3900	2003/2004 season (100%)	1150	375	325	0	0
2	FRA	Brian Joubert	3900	2002/2003 season (100%)	950	700	400	0	0
2	FRA	Brian Joubert	3900	2001/2002 season (70%)	539	0	0	0	0
3	USA	Michael Weiss	3775	2003/2004 season (100%)	950	700	400	0	0
3	USA	Michael Weiss	3775	2002/2003 season (100%)	1000	400	325	0	0
3	USA	Michael Weiss	3775	2001/2002 season (70%)	665	227	158	0	0
4	USA	Timothy Goebel	3500	2003/2004 season (100%)	0	400	375	0	0
4	USA	Timothy Goebel	3500	2002/2003 season (100%)	1150	0	0	0	0
4	USA	Timothy Goebel	3500	2001/2002 season (70%)	805	490	280	0	0
4	CHN	Chengjiang Li	3500	2003/2004 season (100%)	750	375	350	0	0
4	CHN	Chengjiang Li	3500	2002/2003 season (100%)	1050	600	375	0	0
4	CHN	Chengjiang Li	3500	2001/2002 season (70%)	700	245	175	0	0
6	CAN	Emanuel Sandhu	3475	2003/2004 season (100%)	850	800	325	0	0
6	CAN	Emanuel Sandhu	3475	2002/2003 season (100%)	850	375	275	0	0
6	CAN	Emanuel Sandhu	3475	2001/2002 season (70%)	0	210	0	0	0
7	JPN	Takeshi Honda	3440	2003/2004 season (100%)	0	375	350	0	0
7	JPN	Takeshi Honda	3440	2002/2003 season (100%)	1100	400	375	0	0
7	JPN	Takeshi Honda	3440	2001/2002 season (70%)	770	420	280	0	0
8	RUS	Ilia Klimkin	3360	2003/2004 season (100%)	770	275	0	0	0
8	RUS	Ilia Klimkin	3360	2002/2003 season (100%)	800	750	400	50	0
8	RUS	Ilia Klimkin	3360	2001/2002 season (70%)	465	210	210	105	0
9	CHN	Min Zhang	3190	2003/2004 season (100%)	900	350	0	0	0
9	CHN	Min Zhang	3190	2002/2003 season (100%)	805	550	375	0	0
9	CHN	Min Zhang	3190	2001/2002 season (70%)	560	210	192	0	0
10	CAN	Jeffrey Buttle	3017	2003/2004 season (100%)	840	400	375	0	0
10	CAN	Jeffrey Buttle	3017	2002/2003 season (100%)	735	300	250	0	0
10	CAN	Jeffrey Buttle	3017	2001/2002 season (70%)	595	262	0	70	35
11	USA	Evan Lysacek	2930	2003/2004 season (100%)	770	600	250	0	0
11	USA	Evan Lysacek	2930	2002/2003 season (100%)	685	400	225	0	0
11	USA	Evan Lysacek	2930	2001/2002 season (70%)	0	0	0	0	0
12	FRA	Frédéric Dambier	2695	2003/2004 season (100%)	800	350	225	150	0
12	FRA	Frédéric Dambier	2695	2002/2003 season (100%)	595	250	225	100	0
12	FRA	Frédéric Dambier	2695	2001/2002 season (70%)	490	0	0	0	0
12	BEL	Kevin van der Perren	2695	2003/2004 season (100%)	550	650	375	0	0
12	BEL	Kevin van der Perren	2695	2002/2003 season (100%)	525	0	0	0	0
12	BEL	Kevin van der Perren	2695	2001/2002 season (70%)	479	350	175	70	0
14	RUS	Stanislav Timchenko	2648	2003/2004 season (100%)	0	225	0	0	0
14	RUS	Stanislav Timchenko	2648	2002/2003 season (100%)	665	350	275	150	0
14	RUS	Stanislav Timchenko	2648	2001/2002 season (70%)	458	420	175	105	0
15	RUS	Sergei Dobrin	2525	2003/2004 season (100%)	505	400	225	0	0
15	RUS	Sergei Dobrin	2525	2002/2003 season (100%)	595	550	250	0	0
15	RUS	Sergei Dobrin	2525	2001/2002 season (70%)	0	88	70	0	0
16	GER	Andrejs Vlascenko	2450	2003/2004 season (100%)	630	325	0	0	0
16	GER	Andrejs Vlascenko	2450	2002/2003 season (100%)	400	325	250	150	0
16	GER	Andrejs Vlascenko	2450	2001/2002 season (70%)	525	245	192	0	0
17	RUS	Andrei Griazev	2442	2003/2004 season (100%)	715	550	250	0	0
17	RUS	Andrei Griazev	2442	2002/2003 season (100%)	0	450	250	0	0
17	RUS	Andrei Griazev	2442	2001/2002 season (70%)	227	245	175	0	0
17	SUI	Stéphane Lambiel	2442	2003/2004 season (100%)	1050	300	0	0	0
17	SUI	Stéphane Lambiel	2442	2002/2003 season (100%)	750	0	0	150	0
17	SUI	Stéphane Lambiel	2442	2001/2002 season (70%)	514	192	0	0	0
19	RUS	Alexander Abt	2335	2003/2004 season (100%)	0	300	275	0	0
19	RUS	Alexander Abt	2335	2002/2003 season (100%)	0	650	375	0	0
19	RUS	Alexander Abt	2335	2001/2002 season (70%)	735	245	227	0	0
20	JPN	Daisuke Takahashi	2290	2003/2004 season (100%)	700	300	250	0	0
20	JPN	Daisuke Takahashi	2290	2002/2003 season (100%)	420	225	0	0	0
20	JPN	Daisuke Takahashi	2290	2001/2002 season (70%)	500	315	175	0	0
21	GER	Stefan Lindemann	2088	2003/2004 season (100%)	1100	0	0	100	0
21	GER	Stefan Lindemann	2088	2002/2003 season (100%)	455	0	0	100	0
21	GER	Stefan Lindemann	2088	2001/2002 season (70%)	318	175	158	0	0
22	CHN	Song Gao	2084	2003/2004 season (100%)	595	600	350	0	0
22	CHN	Song Gao	2084	2002/2003 season (100%)	0	0	0	0	0
22	CHN	Song Gao	2084	2001/2002 season (70%)	539	0	0	0	0
23	USA	Johnny Weir	2016	2003/2004 season (100%)	1000	0	0	100	0
23	USA	Johnny Weir	2016	2002/2003 season (100%)	0	0	0	0	0
23	USA	Johnny Weir	2016	2001/2002 season (70%)	514	227	175	0	0
24	BLR	Sergei Davydov	2015	2003/2004 season (100%)	455	0	0	0	0
24	BLR	Sergei Davydov	2015	2002/2003 season (100%)	900	300	0	150	0
24	BLR	Sergei Davydov	2015	2001/2002 season (70%)	392	0	0	105	105
25	USA	Matthew Savoie	2009	2003/2004 season (100%)	450	0	0	0	0
25	USA	Matthew Savoie	2009	2002/2003 season (100%)	0	350	300	0	0
25	USA	Matthew Savoie	2009	2001/2002 season (70%)	490	227	192	0	0
26	RUS	Alexander Shubin	1998	2003/2004 season (100%)	0	275	0	0	0
26	RUS	Alexander Shubin	1998	2002/2003 season (100%)	715	600	250	0	0
26	RUS	Alexander Shubin	1998	2001/2002 season (70%)	0	158	88	0	0
27	ROM	Gheorghe Chiper	1980	2003/2004 season (100%)	560	250	0	150	0
27	ROM	Gheorghe Chiper	1980	2002/2003 season (100%)	560	0	0	150	100
27	ROM	Gheorghe Chiper	1980	2001/2002 season (70%)	172	175	0	35	0
28	CHN	Xiaodong Ma	1943	2003/2004 season (100%)	560	0	0	150	0
28	CHN	Xiaodong Ma	1943	2002/2003 season (100%)	0	225	0	0	0
28	CHN	Xiaodong Ma	1943	2001/2002 season (70%)	465	385	158	0	0
29	CAN	Shawn Sawyer	1940	2003/2004 season (100%)	445	200	200	0	0
29	CAN	Shawn Sawyer	1940	2002/2003 season (100%)	565	250	75	0	0
29	CAN	Shawn Sawyer	1940	2001/2002 season (70%)	290	280	175	0	0
30	CZE	Tomáš Verner	1920	2003/2004 season (100%)	525	350	250	0	0
30	CZE	Tomáš Verner	1920	2002/2003 season (100%)	150	300	225	0	0
30	CZE	Tomáš Verner	1920	2001/2002 season (70%)	270	122	18	0	0

==== Ladies' singles (140 skaters) ====
As of 27 March 2004

Rank	Nation	Skater	Points	Season	ISU Championships or Olympics	(Junior) Grand Prix and Final		Selected International Competition	
Rank	Nation	Skater	Points	Season	Best	Best	2nd Best	Best	2nd Best
1	USA	Sasha Cohen	4655	2003/2004 season (100%)	1150	750	400	0	0
1	USA	Sasha Cohen	4655	2002/2003 season (100%)	1050	800	400	0	0
1	USA	Sasha Cohen	4655	2001/2002 season (70%)	735	245	210	105	0
2	JPN	Shizuka Arakawa	4125	2003/2004 season (100%)	1200	700	375	0	0
2	JPN	Shizuka Arakawa	4125	2002/2003 season (100%)	850	650	350	0	0
2	JPN	Shizuka Arakawa	4125	2001/2002 season (70%)	564	227	192	0	0
2	JPN	Fumie Suguri	4125	2003/2004 season (100%)	900	800	400	0	0
2	JPN	Fumie Suguri	4125	2002/2003 season (100%)	1100	550	375	0	0
2	JPN	Fumie Suguri	4125	2001/2002 season (70%)	770	227	175	0	0
4	UKR	Elena Liashenko	3705	2003/2004 season (100%)	805	650	400	0	0
4	UKR	Elena Liashenko	3705	2002/2003 season (100%)	900	600	350	0	0
4	UKR	Elena Liashenko	3705	2001/2002 season (70%)	665	245	192	0	0
5	RUS	Irina Slutskaya	3645	2003/2004 season (100%)	800	0	0	0	0
5	RUS	Irina Slutskaya	3645	2002/2003 season (100%)	840	750	375	0	0
5	RUS	Irina Slutskaya	3645	2001/2002 season (70%)	840	560	280	0	0
6	JPN	Miki Ando	3505	2003/2004 season (100%)	1050	600	250	0	0
6	JPN	Miki Ando	3505	2002/2003 season (100%)	685	500	250	0	0
6	JPN	Miki Ando	3505	2001/2002 season (70%)	458	420	175	0	0
6	USA	Michelle Kwan	3505	2003/2004 season (100%)	1100	0	0	0	0
6	USA	Michelle Kwan	3505	2002/2003 season (100%)	1200	400	0	0	0
6	USA	Michelle Kwan	3505	2001/2002 season (70%)	805	525	280	0	0
8	HUN	Júlia Sebestyén	3380	2003/2004 season (100%)	950	550	350	100	0
8	HUN	Júlia Sebestyén	3380	2002/2003 season (100%)	770	225	0	50	50
8	HUN	Júlia Sebestyén	3380	2001/2002 season (70%)	595	210	192	105	70
9	ITA	Carolina Kostner	3347	2003/2004 season (100%)	1000	375	0	0	0
9	ITA	Carolina Kostner	3347	2002/2003 season (100%)	750	550	250	150	150
9	ITA	Carolina Kostner	3347	2001/2002 season (70%)	312	122	88	0	0
10	RUS	Viktoria Volchkova	3302	2003/2004 season (100%)	500	275	250	0	0
10	RUS	Viktoria Volchkova	3302	2002/2003 season (100%)	1000	700	400	0	0
10	RUS	Viktoria Volchkova	3302	2001/2002 season (70%)	630	262	245	35	0
11	JPN	Yoshie Onda	3220	2003/2004 season (100%)	595	600	375	0	0
11	JPN	Yoshie Onda	3220	2002/2003 season (100%)	700	400	400	0	0
11	JPN	Yoshie Onda	3220	2001/2002 season (70%)	700	420	262	0	0
12	JPN	Yukina Ota	3005	2003/2004 season (100%)	840	325	275	0	0
12	JPN	Yukina Ota	3005	2002/2003 season (100%)	715	600	250	0	0
12	JPN	Yukina Ota	3005	2001/2002 season (70%)	332	245	175	0	0
13	FIN	Alisa Drei	2758	2003/2004 season (100%)	630	300	250	100	0
13	FIN	Alisa Drei	2758	2002/2003 season (100%)	650	350	0	150	100
13	FIN	Alisa Drei	2758	2001/2002 season (70%)	0	158	0	70	0
14	CAN	Jennifer Robinson	2660	2003/2004 season (100%)	700	300	0	0	0
14	CAN	Jennifer Robinson	2660	2002/2003 season (100%)	800	325	325	0	0
14	CAN	Jennifer Robinson	2660	2001/2002 season (70%)	630	210	175	0	0
15	FIN	Susanna Pöykiö	2658	2003/2004 season (100%)	665	325	300	150	0
15	FIN	Susanna Pöykiö	2658	2002/2003 season (100%)	560	350	0	150	0
15	FIN	Susanna Pöykiö	2658	2001/2002 season (70%)	490	158	0	0	0
16	USA	Amber Corwin	2595	2003/2004 season (100%)	770	325	275	0	0
16	USA	Amber Corwin	2595	2002/2003 season (100%)	630	300	225	0	0
16	USA	Amber Corwin	2595	2001/2002 season (70%)	0	0	0	70	0
17	UKR	Galina Maniachenko	2571	2003/2004 season (100%)	420	350	0	150	0
17	UKR	Galina Maniachenko	2571	2002/2003 season (100%)	665	300	250	150	0
17	UKR	Galina Maniachenko	2571	2001/2002 season (70%)	514	192	158	0	0
18	USA	Sarah Hughes	2560	2003/2004 season (100%)	0	0	0	0	0
18	USA	Sarah Hughes	2560	2002/2003 season (100%)	950	0	0	0	0
18	USA	Sarah Hughes	2560	2001/2002 season (70%)	840	490	280	0	0
19	JPN	Yukari Nakano	2465	2003/2004 season (100%)	665	225	225	0	0
19	JPN	Yukari Nakano	2465	2002/2003 season (100%)	770	275	250	0	0
19	JPN	Yukari Nakano	2465	2001/2002 season (70%)	479	280	158	0	0
20	SWE	Lina Johansson	2440	2003/2004 season (100%)	535	550	250	0	0
20	SWE	Lina Johansson	2440	2002/2003 season (100%)	505	350	250	0	0
20	SWE	Lina Johansson	2440	2001/2002 season (70%)	0	0	0	0	0
21	RUS	Elena Sokolova	2422	2003/2004 season (100%)	770	0	0	0	0
21	RUS	Elena Sokolova	2422	2002/2003 season (100%)	1150	275	0	0	0
21	RUS	Elena Sokolova	2422	2001/2002 season (70%)	0	227	0	0	0
22	USA	Beatrisa Liang	2303	2003/2004 season (100%)	0	325	300	0	0
22	USA	Beatrisa Liang	2303	2002/2003 season (100%)	565	450	225	0	0
22	USA	Beatrisa Liang	2303	2001/2002 season (70%)	438	0	0	0	0
23	HUN	Viktória Pavuk	2245	2003/2004 season (100%)	735	500	250	0	0
23	HUN	Viktória Pavuk	2245	2002/2003 season (100%)	385	200	175	0	0
23	HUN	Viktória Pavuk	2245	2001/2002 season (70%)	248	52	0	0	0
24	USA	Jennifer Kirk	2213	2003/2004 season (100%)	350	375	300	0	0
24	USA	Jennifer Kirk	2213	2002/2003 season (100%)	0	325	275	0	0
24	USA	Jennifer Kirk	2213	2001/2002 season (70%)	588	227	0	0	0
25	USA	Ann Patrice McDonough	2197	2003/2004 season (100%)	0	325	0	0	0
25	USA	Ann Patrice McDonough	2197	2002/2003 season (100%)	735	375	0	0	0
25	USA	Ann Patrice McDonough	2197	2001/2002 season (70%)	500	192	0	70	0
26	CAN	Joannie Rochette	2015	2003/2004 season (100%)	850	325	0	0	0
26	CAN	Joannie Rochette	2015	2002/2003 season (100%)	595	0	0	0	0
26	CAN	Joannie Rochette	2015	2001/2002 season (70%)	416	140	105	0	0
27	JPN	Mai Asada	1950	2003/2004 season (100%)	625	450	250	0	0
27	JPN	Mai Asada	1950	2002/2003 season (100%)	625	0	0	0	0
27	JPN	Mai Asada	1950	2001/2002 season (70%)	0	0	0	0	0
28	RUS	Ludmila Nelidina	1890	2003/2004 season (100%)	0	0	0	0	0
28	RUS	Ludmila Nelidina	1890	2002/2003 season (100%)	600	300	275	50	0
28	RUS	Ludmila Nelidina	1890	2001/2002 season (70%)	0	385	175	105	0
29	SUI	Sarah Meier	1880	2003/2004 season (100%)	600	0	0	0	0
29	SUI	Sarah Meier	1880	2002/2003 season (100%)	300	300	250	100	0
29	SUI	Sarah Meier	1880	2001/2002 season (70%)	420	210	0	0	0
30	CAN	Annie Bellemare	1870	2003/2004 season (100%)	0	275	250	0	0
30	CAN	Annie Bellemare	1870	2002/2003 season (100%)	455	250	0	0	0
30	CAN	Annie Bellemare	1870	2001/2002 season (70%)	465	175	158	0	0
31	CHN	Dan Fang	1735	2003/2004 season (100%)	455	225	0	0	0
31	CHN	Dan Fang	1735	2002/2003 season (100%)	665	250	0	0	0
31	CHN	Dan Fang	1735	2001/2002 season (70%)	441	140	0	0	0
32	CAN	Cynthia Phaneuf	1590	2003/2004 season (100%)	805	200	150	0	0
32	CAN	Cynthia Phaneuf	1590	2002/2003 season (100%)	0	200	125	0	0
32	CAN	Cynthia Phaneuf	1590	2001/2002 season (70%)	0	210	175	0	0
33	RUS	Tatiana Basova	1524	2003/2004 season (100%)	245	300	225	0	0
33	RUS	Tatiana Basova	1524	2002/2003 season (100%)	0	175	100	100	0
33	RUS	Tatiana Basova	1524	2001/2002 season (70%)	164	315	158	0	0
34	SVK	Zuzana Babiakova	1430	2003/2004 season (100%)	560	0	0	150	0
34	SVK	Zuzana Babiakova	1430	2002/2003 season (100%)	315	300	0	0	0
34	SVK	Zuzana Babiakova	1430	2001/2002 season (70%)	420	0	0	0	0
35	GBR	Jenna McCorkell	1418	2003/2004 season (100%)	385	225	0	0	0
35	GBR	Jenna McCorkell	1418	2002/2003 season (100%)	415	200	75	0	0
35	GBR	Jenna McCorkell	1418	2001/2002 season (70%)	270	105	88	0	0
36	USA	Louann Donovan	1404	2003/2004 season (100%)	0	150	0	0	0
36	USA	Louann Donovan	1404	2002/2003 season (100%)	445	225	100	0	0
36	USA	Louann Donovan	1404	2001/2002 season (70%)	396	88	0	0	0
37	AUT	Julia Lautowa	1400	2003/2004 season (100%)	595	0	0	150	50
37	AUT	Julia Lautowa	1400	2002/2003 season (100%)	500	0	0	0	0
37	AUT	Julia Lautowa	1400	2001/2002 season (70%)	318	0	0	70	35
38	FRA	Anne Sophie Calvez	1390	2003/2004 season (100%)	400	275	225	0	0
38	FRA	Anne Sophie Calvez	1390	2002/2003 season (100%)	490	0	0	0	0
38	FRA	Anne Sophie Calvez	1390	2001/2002 season (70%)	0	0	0	0	0
39	JPN	Akiko Suzuki	1341	2003/2004 season (100%)	0	0	0	0	0
39	JPN	Akiko Suzuki	1341	2002/2003 season (100%)	0	250	150	0	0
39	JPN	Akiko Suzuki	1341	2001/2002 season (70%)	416	350	175	0	0
40	FIN	Elina Kettunen	1340	2003/2004 season (100%)	0	0	0	0	0
40	FIN	Elina Kettunen	1340	2002/2003 season (100%)	525	325	0	0	0
40	FIN	Elina Kettunen	1340	2001/2002 season (70%)	490	0	0	0	0
41	USA	Kimmie Meissner	1335	2003/2004 season (100%)	685	400	250	0	0
41	USA	Kimmie Meissner	1335	2002/2003 season (100%)	0	0	0	0	0
41	USA	Kimmie Meissner	1335	2001/2002 season (70%)	0	0	0	0	0
42	CZE	Lucie Krausová	1316	2003/2004 season (100%)	0	250	100	50	0
42	CZE	Lucie Krausová	1316	2002/2003 season (100%)	420	150	150	0	0
42	CZE	Lucie Krausová	1316	2001/2002 season (70%)	196	52	52	0	0
43	RUS	Kristina Oblasova	1285	2003/2004 season (100%)	315	250	0	0	0
43	RUS	Kristina Oblasova	1285	2002/2003 season (100%)	475	0	0	0	0
43	RUS	Kristina Oblasova	1285	2001/2002 season (70%)	290	210	0	35	0
44	RUS	Olga Naidenova	1245	2003/2004 season (100%)	0	300	225	50	0
44	RUS	Olga Naidenova	1245	2002/2003 season (100%)	295	250	125	0	0
44	RUS	Olga Naidenova	1245	2001/2002 season (70%)	0	0	0	0	0
45	CHN	Binshu Xu	1210	2003/2004 season (100%)	475	0	0	0	0
45	CHN	Binshu Xu	1210	2002/2003 season (100%)	535	100	100	0	0
45	CHN	Binshu Xu	1210	2001/2002 season (70%)	0	0	0	0	0
46	USA	Danielle Kahle	1165	2003/2004 season (100%)	415	350	250	0	0
46	USA	Danielle Kahle	1165	2002/2003 season (100%)	0	150	0	0	0
46	USA	Danielle Kahle	1165	2001/2002 season (70%)	0	0	0	0	0
46	AUS	Miriam Manzano	1165	2003/2004 season (100%)	490	0	0	50	0
46	AUS	Miriam Manzano	1165	2002/2003 season (100%)	525	0	0	100	0
46	AUS	Miriam Manzano	1165	2001/2002 season (70%)	318	0	0	0	0
48	USA	Angela Nikodinov	1120	2003/2004 season (100%)	630	0	0	0	0
48	USA	Angela Nikodinov	1120	2002/2003 season (100%)	0	0	0	0	0
48	USA	Angela Nikodinov	1120	2001/2002 season (70%)	0	245	245	0	0
49	JPN	Aki Sawada	1095	2003/2004 season (100%)	595	200	150	0	0
49	JPN	Aki Sawada	1095	2002/2003 season (100%)	0	150	0	0	0
49	JPN	Aki Sawada	1095	2001/2002 season (70%)	0	0	0	0	0
50	USA	Ye Bin Mok	1070	2003/2004 season (100%)	0	0	0	0	0
50	USA	Ye Bin Mok	1070	2002/2003 season (100%)	595	200	175	100	0
50	USA	Ye Bin Mok	1070	2001/2002 season (70%)	0	0	0	0	0
51	USA	Katy Taylor	1055	2003/2004 season (100%)	655	225	175	0	0
51	USA	Katy Taylor	1055	2002/2003 season (100%)	0	0	0	0	0
51	USA	Katy Taylor	1055	2001/2002 season (70%)	0	0	0	0	0
52	UZB	Tatiana Malinina	1033	2003/2004 season (100%)	0	0	0	0	0
52	UZB	Tatiana Malinina	1033	2002/2003 season (100%)	0	0	0	0	0
52	UZB	Tatiana Malinina	1033	2001/2002 season (70%)	368	385	280	0	0
53	HUN	Diána Póth	1005	2003/2004 season (100%)	0	275	250	100	100
53	HUN	Diána Póth	1005	2002/2003 season (100%)	280	0	0	0	0
53	HUN	Diána Póth	1005	2001/2002 season (70%)	0	0	0	0	0
54	CAN	Signe Ronka	985	2003/2004 season (100%)	0	125	0	0	0
54	CAN	Signe Ronka	985	2002/2003 season (100%)	265	300	225	0	0
54	CAN	Signe Ronka	985	2001/2002 season (70%)	0	70	0	0	0
55	RUS	Alima Gershkovich	970	2003/2004 season (100%)	295	175	150	0	0
55	RUS	Alima Gershkovich	970	2002/2003 season (100%)	0	200	150	0	0
55	RUS	Alima Gershkovich	970	2001/2002 season (70%)	0	0	0	0	0
56	CHN	Yan Liu	945	2003/2004 season (100%)	560	0	0	0	0
56	CHN	Yan Liu	945	2002/2003 season (100%)	385	0	0	0	0
56	CHN	Yan Liu	945	2001/2002 season (70%)	0	0	0	0	0
57	AZE	Daria Timoshenko	910	2003/2004 season (100%)	455	0	0	0	0
57	AZE	Daria Timoshenko	910	2002/2003 season (100%)	455	0	0	0	0
57	AZE	Daria Timoshenko	910	2001/2002 season (70%)	0	0	0	0	0
58	CRO	Idora Hegel	885	2003/2004 season (100%)	450	0	0	50	0
58	CRO	Idora Hegel	885	2002/2003 season (100%)	385	0	0	0	0
58	CRO	Idora Hegel	885	2001/2002 season (70%)	385	0	0	0	0
59	GER	Annette Dytrt	880	2003/2004 season (100%)	490	250	0	0	0
59	GER	Annette Dytrt	880	2002/2003 season (100%)	140	0	0	0	0
59	GER	Annette Dytrt	880	2001/2002 season (70%)	0	0	0	0	0
60	AUS	Joanne Carter	875	2003/2004 season (100%)	525	0	0	0	0
60	AUS	Joanne Carter	875	2002/2003 season (100%)	350	0	0	0	0
60	AUS	Joanne Carter	875	2001/2002 season (70%)	294	0	0	0	0
60	ITA	Silvia Fontana	875	2003/2004 season (100%)	0	0	0	0	0
60	ITA	Silvia Fontana	875	2002/2003 season (100%)	0	0	0	0	0
60	ITA	Silvia Fontana	875	2001/2002 season (70%)	525	175	175	0	0
62	UZB	Anastasia Gimazetdinova	830	2003/2004 season (100%)	245	0	0	0	0
62	UZB	Anastasia Gimazetdinova	830	2002/2003 season (100%)	560	0	0	0	0
62	UZB	Anastasia Gimazetdinova	830	2001/2002 season (70%)	270	0	0	0	0
63	USA	Alissa Czisny	775	2003/2004 season (100%)	0	150	0	0	0
63	USA	Alissa Czisny	775	2002/2003 season (100%)	0	400	225	0	0
63	USA	Alissa Czisny	775	2001/2002 season (70%)	0	0	0	0	0
64	FIN	Kiira Korpi	765	2003/2004 season (100%)	265	200	125	0	0
64	FIN	Kiira Korpi	765	2002/2003 season (100%)	175	0	0	0	0
64	FIN	Kiira Korpi	765	2001/2002 season (70%)	0	0	0	0	0
65	ITA	Valentina Marchei	738	2003/2004 season (100%)	350	125	50	0	0
65	ITA	Valentina Marchei	738	2002/2003 season (100%)	0	125	0	0	0
65	ITA	Valentina Marchei	738	2001/2002 season (70%)	0	88	0	0	0
66	CAN	Meagan Duhamel	707	2003/2004 season (100%)	0	125	0	0	0
66	CAN	Meagan Duhamel	707	2002/2003 season (100%)	355	175	0	0	0
66	CAN	Meagan Duhamel	707	2001/2002 season (70%)	0	52	0	0	0
67	KOR	Bit-Na Park	700	2003/2004 season (100%)	280	0	0	0	0
67	KOR	Bit-Na Park	700	2002/2003 season (100%)	420	0	0	0	0
67	KOR	Bit-Na Park	700	2001/2002 season (70%)	196	0	0	0	0
68	CAN	Lauren Wilson	697	2003/2004 season (100%)	0	0	0	0	0
68	CAN	Lauren Wilson	697	2002/2003 season (100%)	0	75	75	0	0
68	CAN	Lauren Wilson	697	2001/2002 season (70%)	354	105	88	0	0
69	RUS	Angelina Turenko	680	2003/2004 season (100%)	505	175	0	0	0
69	RUS	Angelina Turenko	680	2002/2003 season (100%)	0	0	0	0	0
69	RUS	Angelina Turenko	680	2001/2002 season (70%)	0	0	0	0	0
70	USA	Jennifer Don	670	2003/2004 season (100%)	420	0	0	150	0
70	USA	Jennifer Don	670	2002/2003 season (100%)	0	100	0	0	0
70	USA	Jennifer Don	670	2001/2002 season (70%)	0	0	0	0	0
71	ITA	Giorgia Carrossa	633	2003/2004 season (100%)	175	150	0	0	0
71	ITA	Giorgia Carrossa	633	2002/2003 season (100%)	145	75	0	0	0
71	ITA	Giorgia Carrossa	633	2001/2002 season (70%)	0	88	0	0	0
72	RSA	Shirene Human	630	2003/2004 season (100%)	315	0	0	0	0
72	RSA	Shirene Human	630	2002/2003 season (100%)	315	0	0	0	0
72	RSA	Shirene Human	630	2001/2002 season (70%)	245	0	0	0	0
73	SLO	Mojca Kopac	585	2003/2004 season (100%)	280	0	0	0	0
73	SLO	Mojca Kopac	585	2002/2003 season (100%)	250	0	0	0	0
73	SLO	Mojca Kopac	585	2001/2002 season (70%)	270	0	0	35	0
74	CAN	Michelle Currie	555	2003/2004 season (100%)	0	0	0	0	0
74	CAN	Michelle Currie	555	2002/2003 season (100%)	0	225	225	0	0
74	CAN	Michelle Currie	555	2001/2002 season (70%)	0	0	0	105	0
75	USA	Adriana Desanctis	550	2003/2004 season (100%)	0	75	0	0	0
75	USA	Adriana Desanctis	550	2002/2003 season (100%)	0	250	225	0	0
75	USA	Adriana Desanctis	550	2001/2002 season (70%)	0	0	0	0	0
76	SUI	Kimena Brog Meier	529	2003/2004 season (100%)	0	0	0	0	0
76	SUI	Kimena Brog Meier	529	2002/2003 season (100%)	105	0	0	0	0
76	SUI	Kimena Brog Meier	529	2001/2002 season (70%)	144	158	122	0	0
77	POL	Sabina Wojtala	520	2003/2004 season (100%)	0	0	0	0	0
77	POL	Sabina Wojtala	520	2002/2003 season (100%)	245	225	0	50	0
77	POL	Sabina Wojtala	520	2001/2002 season (70%)	0	0	0	0	0
78	CHN	Siyin Sun	490	2003/2004 season (100%)	0	0	0	0	0
78	CHN	Siyin Sun	490	2002/2003 season (100%)	490	0	0	0	0
78	CHN	Siyin Sun	490	2001/2002 season (70%)	0	0	0	0	0
79	GEO	Elene Gedevanishvili	485	2003/2004 season (100%)	385	100	0	0	0
79	GEO	Elene Gedevanishvili	485	2002/2003 season (100%)	0	0	0	0	0
79	GEO	Elene Gedevanishvili	485	2001/2002 season (70%)	0	0	0	0	0
79	CHN	Fan Zhang	485	2003/2004 season (100%)	385	0	0	0	0
79	CHN	Fan Zhang	485	2002/2003 season (100%)	0	100	0	0	0
79	CHN	Fan Zhang	485	2001/2002 season (70%)	0	0	0	0	0
81	AUS	Stephanie Zhang	479	2003/2004 season (100%)	0	0	0	0	0
81	AUS	Stephanie Zhang	479	2002/2003 season (100%)	0	0	0	0	0
81	AUS	Stephanie Zhang	479	2001/2002 season (70%)	374	105	0	0	0
82	JPN	Akiko Kitamura	475	2003/2004 season (100%)	0	250	225	0	0
82	JPN	Akiko Kitamura	475	2002/2003 season (100%)	0	0	0	0	0
82	JPN	Akiko Kitamura	475	2001/2002 season (70%)	0	0	0	0	0
83	FRA	Vanessa Gusmeroli	448	2003/2004 season (100%)	0	0	0	0	0
83	FRA	Vanessa Gusmeroli	448	2002/2003 season (100%)	0	0	0	0	0
83	FRA	Vanessa Gusmeroli	448	2001/2002 season (70%)	343	0	0	105	0
84	AUS	Sarah-Yvonne Prytula	420	2003/2004 season (100%)	210	0	0	0	0
84	AUS	Sarah-Yvonne Prytula	420	2002/2003 season (100%)	210	0	0	0	0
84	AUS	Sarah-Yvonne Prytula	420	2001/2002 season (70%)	24	0	0	0	0
85	SWE	Asa Persson	402	2003/2004 season (100%)	0	0	0	0	0
85	SWE	Asa Persson	402	2002/2003 season (100%)	0	0	0	0	0
85	SWE	Asa Persson	402	2001/2002 season (70%)	227	105	70	0	0
86	MEX	Michelle Cantu	400	2003/2004 season (100%)	350	50	0	0	0
86	MEX	Michelle Cantu	400	2002/2003 season (100%)	0	0	0	0	0
86	MEX	Michelle Cantu	400	2001/2002 season (70%)	0	0	0	0	0
87	GER	Denise Zimmermann	385	2003/2004 season (100%)	235	100	50	0	0
87	GER	Denise Zimmermann	385	2002/2003 season (100%)	0	0	0	0	0
87	GER	Denise Zimmermann	385	2001/2002 season (70%)	0	0	0	0	0
88	CAN	Amanda Billings	380	2003/2004 season (100%)	0	25	0	0	0
88	CAN	Amanda Billings	380	2002/2003 season (100%)	235	50	0	0	0
88	CAN	Amanda Billings	380	2001/2002 season (70%)	0	70	0	0	0
89	JPN	Ayako Hagiwara	375	2003/2004 season (100%)	0	75	0	0	0
89	JPN	Ayako Hagiwara	375	2002/2003 season (100%)	0	175	125	0	0
89	JPN	Ayako Hagiwara	375	2001/2002 season (70%)	0	0	0	0	0
90	RSA	Jenna-Anne Buys	360	2003/2004 season (100%)	70	0	0	0	0
90	RSA	Jenna-Anne Buys	360	2002/2003 season (100%)	140	0	0	0	0
90	RSA	Jenna-Anne Buys	360	2001/2002 season (70%)	220	0	0	0	0
91	BEL	Sara Falotico	357	2003/2004 season (100%)	140	0	0	0	0
91	BEL	Sara Falotico	357	2002/2003 season (100%)	115	50	0	0	0
91	BEL	Sara Falotico	357	2001/2002 season (70%)	80	52	0	0	0
92	FRA	Candice Didier	350	2003/2004 season (100%)	0	0	0	0	0
92	FRA	Candice Didier	350	2002/2003 season (100%)	325	25	0	0	0
92	FRA	Candice Didier	350	2001/2002 season (70%)	0	0	0	0	0
92	ITA	Vanessa Giunchi	350	2003/2004 season (100%)	0	0	0	0	0
92	ITA	Vanessa Giunchi	350	2002/2003 season (100%)	175	0	0	0	0
92	ITA	Vanessa Giunchi	350	2001/2002 season (70%)	175	0	0	0	0
92	USA	Jessica Houston	350	2003/2004 season (100%)	0	175	175	0	0
92	USA	Jessica Houston	350	2002/2003 season (100%)	0	0	0	0	0
92	USA	Jessica Houston	350	2001/2002 season (70%)	0	0	0	0	0
92	KOR	Sun-Bin Lee	350	2003/2004 season (100%)	105	0	0	0	0
92	KOR	Sun-Bin Lee	350	2002/2003 season (100%)	245	0	0	0	0
92	KOR	Sun-Bin Lee	350	2001/2002 season (70%)	0	0	0	0	0
92	CAN	Ashton Tessier	350	2003/2004 season (100%)	0	50	0	0	0
92	CAN	Ashton Tessier	350	2002/2003 season (100%)	0	175	125	0	0
92	CAN	Ashton Tessier	350	2001/2002 season (70%)	0	0	0	0	0
92	RUS	Irina Tkatchuk	350	2003/2004 season (100%)	0	0	0	0	0
92	RUS	Irina Tkatchuk	350	2002/2003 season (100%)	0	0	0	0	0
92	RUS	Irina Tkatchuk	350	2001/2002 season (70%)	0	175	175	0	0
92	EST	Olga Vassiljeva	350	2003/2004 season (100%)	0	0	0	0	0
92	EST	Olga Vassiljeva	350	2002/2003 season (100%)	350	0	0	0	0
92	EST	Olga Vassiljeva	350	2001/2002 season (70%)	0	0	0	0	0
99	USA	Andrea Gardiner	343	2003/2004 season (100%)	0	0	0	0	0
99	USA	Andrea Gardiner	343	2002/2003 season (100%)	0	0	0	0	0
99	USA	Andrea Gardiner	343	2001/2002 season (70%)	343	0	0	0	0
100	KOR	Ji Eun Choi	330	2003/2004 season (100%)	0	125	0	0	0
100	KOR	Ji Eun Choi	330	2002/2003 season (100%)	205	0	0	0	0
100	KOR	Ji Eun Choi	330	2001/2002 season (70%)	0	0	0	0	0
100	UKR	Svetlana Pilipenko	330	2003/2004 season (100%)	0	0	0	0	0
100	UKR	Svetlana Pilipenko	330	2002/2003 season (100%)	0	50	0	0	0
100	UKR	Svetlana Pilipenko	330	2001/2002 season (70%)	122	158	0	0	0
102	ROM	Roxana Luca	328	2003/2004 season (100%)	0	0	0	0	0
102	ROM	Roxana Luca	328	2002/2003 season (100%)	0	0	0	0	0
102	ROM	Roxana Luca	328	2001/2002 season (70%)	206	122	0	0	0
103	CAN	Jessica Dube	325	2003/2004 season (100%)	0	200	125	0	0
103	CAN	Jessica Dube	325	2002/2003 season (100%)	0	0	0	0	0
103	CAN	Jessica Dube	325	2001/2002 season (70%)	0	0	0	0	0
104	LUX	Fleur Maxwell	305	2003/2004 season (100%)	205	25	0	0	0
104	LUX	Fleur Maxwell	305	2002/2003 season (100%)	0	75	0	0	0
104	LUX	Fleur Maxwell	305	2001/2002 season (70%)	0	0	0	0	0
105	USA	Natalie Mecher	300	2003/2004 season (100%)	0	50	0	0	0
105	USA	Natalie Mecher	300	2002/2003 season (100%)	0	200	50	0	0
105	USA	Natalie Mecher	300	2001/2002 season (70%)	0	0	0	0	0
106	POL	Magdalena Leska	297	2003/2004 season (100%)	0	0	0	0	0
106	POL	Magdalena Leska	297	2002/2003 season (100%)	0	0	0	0	0
106	POL	Magdalena Leska	297	2001/2002 season (70%)	122	140	35	0	0
107	MEX	Gladys Orozco	287	2003/2004 season (100%)	140	0	0	0	0
107	MEX	Gladys Orozco	287	2002/2003 season (100%)	35	0	0	0	0
107	MEX	Gladys Orozco	287	2001/2002 season (70%)	147	0	0	0	0
108	FIN	Sari Hakola	283	2003/2004 season (100%)	0	25	0	0	0
108	FIN	Sari Hakola	283	2002/2003 season (100%)	0	100	75	0	0
108	FIN	Sari Hakola	283	2001/2002 season (70%)	38	35	35	0	0
109	TPE	Diane Chen	280	2003/2004 season (100%)	175	0	0	0	0
109	TPE	Diane Chen	280	2002/2003 season (100%)	105	0	0	0	0
109	TPE	Diane Chen	280	2001/2002 season (70%)	49	0	0	0	0
109	KOR	Young-Eun Choi	280	2003/2004 season (100%)	0	0	0	0	0
109	KOR	Young-Eun Choi	280	2002/2003 season (100%)	280	0	0	0	0
109	KOR	Young-Eun Choi	280	2001/2002 season (70%)	0	0	0	0	0
111	USA	Brianna Perry	275	2003/2004 season (100%)	0	175	100	0	0
111	USA	Brianna Perry	275	2002/2003 season (100%)	0	0	0	0	0
111	USA	Brianna Perry	275	2001/2002 season (70%)	0	0	0	0	0
112	HUN	Tamara Dorofejev	274	2003/2004 season (100%)	0	0	0	0	0
112	HUN	Tamara Dorofejev	274	2002/2003 season (100%)	0	225	0	0	0
112	HUN	Tamara Dorofejev	274	2001/2002 season (70%)	49	0	0	0	0
113	FRA	Gwendoline Didier	245	2003/2004 season (100%)	145	75	0	0	0
113	FRA	Gwendoline Didier	245	2002/2003 season (100%)	0	25	0	0	0
113	FRA	Gwendoline Didier	245	2001/2002 season (70%)	0	0	0	0	0
113	BLR	Julia Soldatova	245	2003/2004 season (100%)	0	0	0	0	0
113	BLR	Julia Soldatova	245	2002/2003 season (100%)	0	0	0	0	0
113	BLR	Julia Soldatova	245	2001/2002 season (70%)	245	0	0	0	0
115	RUS	Olga Agapkina	228	2003/2004 season (100%)	0	0	0	0	0
115	RUS	Olga Agapkina	228	2002/2003 season (100%)	0	0	0	0	0
115	RUS	Olga Agapkina	228	2001/2002 season (70%)	0	158	70	0	0
116	GER	Christiane Berger	225	2003/2004 season (100%)	0	0	0	0	0
116	GER	Christiane Berger	225	2002/2003 season (100%)	0	150	75	0	0
116	GER	Christiane Berger	225	2001/2002 season (70%)	0	0	0	0	0
116	SWE	Johanna Götesson	225	2003/2004 season (100%)	0	175	50	0	0
116	SWE	Johanna Götesson	225	2002/2003 season (100%)	0	0	0	0	0
116	SWE	Johanna Götesson	225	2001/2002 season (70%)	0	0	0	0	0
116	CAN	Myriane Samson	225	2003/2004 season (100%)	0	225	0	0	0
116	CAN	Myriane Samson	225	2002/2003 season (100%)	0	0	0	0	0
116	CAN	Myriane Samson	225	2001/2002 season (70%)	0	0	0	0	0
119	ESP	Marta Andrade	220	2003/2004 season (100%)	0	0	0	0	0
119	ESP	Marta Andrade	220	2002/2003 season (100%)	0	0	0	0	0
119	ESP	Marta Andrade	220	2001/2002 season (70%)	220	0	0	0	0
120	ESP	Laura Fernandez	215	2003/2004 season (100%)	115	100	0	0	0
120	ESP	Laura Fernandez	215	2002/2003 season (100%)	0	0	0	0	0
120	ESP	Laura Fernandez	215	2001/2002 season (70%)	0	0	0	0	0
121	CZE	Petra Lukacikova	210	2003/2004 season (100%)	210	0	0	0	0
121	CZE	Petra Lukacikova	210	2002/2003 season (100%)	0	0	0	0	0
121	CZE	Petra Lukacikova	210	2001/2002 season (70%)	0	0	0	0	0
122	USA	Felicia Beck	200	2003/2004 season (100%)	0	0	0	0	0
122	USA	Felicia Beck	200	2002/2003 season (100%)	0	200	0	0	0
122	USA	Felicia Beck	200	2001/2002 season (70%)	0	0	0	0	0
122	FIN	Mona Grannenfelt	200	2003/2004 season (100%)	0	100	0	0	0
122	FIN	Mona Grannenfelt	200	2002/2003 season (100%)	0	100	0	0	0
122	FIN	Mona Grannenfelt	200	2001/2002 season (70%)	0	0	0	0	0
122	RUS	Elena Naumova	200	2003/2004 season (100%)	0	200	0	0	0
122	RUS	Elena Naumova	200	2002/2003 season (100%)	0	0	0	0	0
122	RUS	Elena Naumova	200	2001/2002 season (70%)	0	0	0	0	0
125	LUX	Anna Bernauer	175	2003/2004 season (100%)	175	0	0	0	0
125	LUX	Anna Bernauer	175	2002/2003 season (100%)	0	0	0	0	0
125	LUX	Anna Bernauer	175	2001/2002 season (70%)	0	0	0	0	0
125	CAN	Monica Boucher	175	2003/2004 season (100%)	0	50	0	0	0
125	CAN	Monica Boucher	175	2002/2003 season (100%)	0	125	0	0	0
125	CAN	Monica Boucher	175	2001/2002 season (70%)	0	0	0	0	0
125	RUS	Maria Bubenikhina	175	2003/2004 season (100%)	0	0	0	0	0
125	RUS	Maria Bubenikhina	175	2002/2003 season (100%)	0	150	25	0	0
125	RUS	Maria Bubenikhina	175	2001/2002 season (70%)	0	0	0	0	0
125	MEX	Ana Cecilia Cantu	175	2003/2004 season (100%)	0	0	0	0	0
125	MEX	Ana Cecilia Cantu	175	2002/2003 season (100%)	175	0	0	0	0
125	MEX	Ana Cecilia Cantu	175	2001/2002 season (70%)	0	0	0	0	0
125	GER	Zoya Douchine	175	2003/2004 season (100%)	0	0	0	0	0
125	GER	Zoya Douchine	175	2002/2003 season (100%)	0	0	0	0	0
125	GER	Zoya Douchine	175	2001/2002 season (70%)	0	175	0	0	0
125	JPN	Satsuki Muramoto	175	2003/2004 season (100%)	0	175	0	0	0
125	JPN	Satsuki Muramoto	175	2002/2003 season (100%)	0	0	0	0	0
125	JPN	Satsuki Muramoto	175	2001/2002 season (70%)	0	0	0	0	0
131	CHN	Qingyun Wang	172	2003/2004 season (100%)	0	0	0	0	0
131	CHN	Qingyun Wang	172	2002/2003 season (100%)	0	0	0	0	0
131	CHN	Qingyun Wang	172	2001/2002 season (70%)	172	0	0	0	0
132	GER	Veronika Diewald	160	2003/2004 season (100%)	0	0	0	0	0
132	GER	Veronika Diewald	160	2002/2003 season (100%)	0	125	0	0	0
132	GER	Veronika Diewald	160	2001/2002 season (70%)	0	35	0	0	0
132	UKR	Irina Lukianenko	160	2003/2004 season (100%)	0	0	0	0	0
132	UKR	Irina Lukianenko	160	2002/2003 season (100%)	55	0	0	0	0
132	UKR	Irina Lukianenko	160	2001/2002 season (70%)	0	70	0	35	0
134	GER	Mikkeline Kierkgaard	158	2003/2004 season (100%)	0	0	0	0	0
134	GER	Mikkeline Kierkgaard	158	2002/2003 season (100%)	0	0	0	0	0
134	GER	Mikkeline Kierkgaard	158	2001/2002 season (70%)	0	158	0	0	0
135	USA	Erica Archambault	150	2003/2004 season (100%)	0	150	0	0	0
135	USA	Erica Archambault	150	2002/2003 season (100%)	0	0	0	0	0
135	USA	Erica Archambault	150	2001/2002 season (70%)	0	0	0	0	0
135	GER	Katharina Häcker	150	2003/2004 season (100%)	0	100	25	0	0
135	GER	Katharina Häcker	150	2002/2003 season (100%)	0	25	0	0	0
135	GER	Katharina Häcker	150	2001/2002 season (70%)	0	0	0	0	0
135	RUS	Valeria Vorobieva	150	2003/2004 season (100%)	0	150	0	0	0
135	RUS	Valeria Vorobieva	150	2002/2003 season (100%)	0	0	0	0	0
135	RUS	Valeria Vorobieva	150	2001/2002 season (70%)	0	0	0	0	0
138	FIN	Henna Hietala	145	2003/2004 season (100%)	0	75	0	0	0
138	FIN	Henna Hietala	145	2002/2003 season (100%)	0	0	0	0	0
138	FIN	Henna Hietala	145	2001/2002 season (70%)	0	70	0	0	0
139	USA	Jane Bugaeva	125	2003/2004 season (100%)	0	125	0	0	0
139	USA	Jane Bugaeva	125	2002/2003 season (100%)	0	0	0	0	0
139	USA	Jane Bugaeva	125	2001/2002 season (70%)	0	0	0	0	0
139	GER	Stefanie Dankert	125	2003/2004 season (100%)	0	0	0	0	0
139	GER	Stefanie Dankert	125	2002/2003 season (100%)	0	125	0	0	0
139	GER	Stefanie Dankert	125	2001/2002 season (70%)	0	0	0	0	0

==== Pairs (60 couples) ====
As of 24 March 2004

Rank	Nation	Couple	Points	Season	ISU Championships or Olympics	(Junior) Grand Prix and Final		Selected International Competition	
Rank	Nation	Couple	Points	Season	Best	Best	2nd Best	Best	2nd Best
1	CHN	Xue Shen / Hongbo Zhao	4790	2003/2004 season (100%)	1150	800	400	0	0
1	CHN	Xue Shen / Hongbo Zhao	4790	2002/2003 season (100%)	1200	750	400	0	0
1	CHN	Xue Shen / Hongbo Zhao	4790	2001/2002 season (70%)	840	490	280	0	0
2	RUS	Tatiana Totmianina / Maxim Marinin	4700	2003/2004 season (100%)	1200	750	400	0	0
2	RUS	Tatiana Totmianina / Maxim Marinin	4700	2002/2003 season (100%)	1150	800	400	0	0
2	RUS	Tatiana Totmianina / Maxim Marinin	4700	2001/2002 season (70%)	805	262	245	0	0
3	RUS	Maria Petrova / Alexei Tikhonov	4370	2003/2004 season (100%)	1050	700	400	0	0
3	RUS	Maria Petrova / Alexei Tikhonov	4370	2002/2003 season (100%)	1100	700	375	0	0
3	RUS	Maria Petrova / Alexei Tikhonov	4370	2001/2002 season (70%)	735	420	262	0	0
4	CHN	Qing Pang / Jian Tong	3875	2003/2004 season (100%)	1100	600	400	0	0
4	CHN	Qing Pang / Jian Tong	3875	2002/2003 season (100%)	1050	375	350	0	0
4	CHN	Qing Pang / Jian Tong	3875	2001/2002 season (70%)	700	227	210	0	0
5	CAN	Anabelle Langlois / Patrice Archetto	3800	2003/2004 season (100%)	850	650	375	0	0
5	CAN	Anabelle Langlois / Patrice Archetto	3800	2002/2003 season (100%)	1000	550	375	0	0
5	CAN	Anabelle Langlois / Patrice Archetto	3800	2001/2002 season (70%)	564	245	0	0	0
6	CHN	Dan Zhang / Hao Zhang	3645	2003/2004 season (100%)	1000	550	400	0	0
6	CHN	Dan Zhang / Hao Zhang	3645	2002/2003 season (100%)	950	325	325	0	0
6	CHN	Dan Zhang / Hao Zhang	3645	2001/2002 season (70%)	560	420	175	0	0
7	POL	Dorota Zagorska / Mariusz Siudek	3525	2003/2004 season (100%)	950	350	350	0	0
7	POL	Dorota Zagorska / Mariusz Siudek	3525	2002/2003 season (100%)	900	600	375	0	0
7	POL	Dorota Zagorska / Mariusz Siudek	3525	2001/2002 season (70%)	665	245	227	0	0
8	CHN	Yang Ding / Zhongfei Ren	2800	2003/2004 season (100%)	665	250	225	0	0
8	CHN	Yang Ding / Zhongfei Ren	2800	2002/2003 season (100%)	685	600	250	0	0
8	CHN	Yang Ding / Zhongfei Ren	2800	2001/2002 season (70%)	458	350	158	0	0
9	USA	Rena Inoue / John Baldwin, Jr.	2725	2003/2004 season (100%)	750	325	300	0	0
9	USA	Rena Inoue / John Baldwin, Jr.	2725	2002/2003 season (100%)	750	300	300	0	0
9	USA	Rena Inoue / John Baldwin, Jr.	2725	2001/2002 season (70%)	441	0	0	0	0
10	USA	Tiffany Scott / Philip Dulebohn	2680	2003/2004 season (100%)	595	350	300	0	0
10	USA	Tiffany Scott / Philip Dulebohn	2680	2002/2003 season (100%)	800	300	300	0	0
10	USA	Tiffany Scott / Philip Dulebohn	2680	2001/2002 season (70%)	630	0	0	0	0
11	CZE	Katerina Berankova / Otto Dlabola	2375	2003/2004 season (100%)	700	300	225	0	0
11	CZE	Katerina Berankova / Otto Dlabola	2375	2002/2003 season (100%)	700	275	0	0	0
11	CZE	Katerina Berankova / Otto Dlabola	2375	2001/2002 season (70%)	595	175	158	0	0
12	UKR	Tatiana Volosozhar / Petr Kharchenko	2335	2003/2004 season (100%)	595	450	275	0	0
12	UKR	Tatiana Volosozhar / Petr Kharchenko	2335	2002/2003 season (100%)	630	175	175	0	0
12	UKR	Tatiana Volosozhar / Petr Kharchenko	2335	2001/2002 season (70%)	312	210	158	0	0
13	USA	Kathryn Orscher / Garrett Lucash	2070	2003/2004 season (100%)	630	225	0	0	0
13	USA	Kathryn Orscher / Garrett Lucash	2070	2002/2003 season (100%)	665	250	250	50	0
13	USA	Kathryn Orscher / Garrett Lucash	2070	2001/2002 season (70%)	368	0	0	0	0
14	CAN	Valerie Marcoux / Craig Buntin	2050	2003/2004 season (100%)	800	325	250	0	0
14	CAN	Valerie Marcoux / Craig Buntin	2050	2002/2003 season (100%)	0	275	250	150	0
14	CAN	Valerie Marcoux / Craig Buntin	2050	2001/2002 season (70%)	0	0	0	0	0
15	USA	Brittany Vise / Nicholas Kole	1935	2003/2004 season (100%)	565	350	225	0	0
15	USA	Brittany Vise / Nicholas Kole	1935	2002/2003 season (100%)	445	200	150	0	0
15	USA	Brittany Vise / Nicholas Kole	1935	2001/2002 season (70%)	0	0	0	0	0
16	CAN	Elizabeth Putnam / Sean Wirtz	1695	2003/2004 season (100%)	560	300	275	0	0
16	CAN	Elizabeth Putnam / Sean Wirtz	1695	2002/2003 season (100%)	560	0	0	0	0
16	CAN	Elizabeth Putnam / Sean Wirtz	1695	2001/2002 season (70%)	0	0	0	0	0
17	GER	Eva-Maria Fitze / Rico Rex	1685	2003/2004 season (100%)	650	0	0	0	0
17	GER	Eva-Maria Fitze / Rico Rex	1685	2002/2003 season (100%)	560	250	225	0	0
17	GER	Eva-Maria Fitze / Rico Rex	1685	2001/2002 season (70%)	0	0	0	0	0
18	RUS	Elena Berezhnaya / Anton Sikharulidze	1645	2003/2004 season (100%)	0	0	0	0	0
18	RUS	Elena Berezhnaya / Anton Sikharulidze	1645	2002/2003 season (100%)	0	0	0	0	0
18	RUS	Elena Berezhnaya / Anton Sikharulidze	1645	2001/2002 season (70%)	840	525	280	0	0
19	UKR	Tatiana Chuvaeva / Dmitri Palamarchuk	1557	2003/2004 season (100%)	0	0	0	0	0
19	UKR	Tatiana Chuvaeva / Dmitri Palamarchuk	1557	2002/2003 season (100%)	525	225	0	150	0
19	UKR	Tatiana Chuvaeva / Dmitri Palamarchuk	1557	2001/2002 season (70%)	465	192	0	0	0
20	CAN	Jessica Dube / Bryce Davison	1535	2003/2004 season (100%)	685	600	250	0	0
20	CAN	Jessica Dube / Bryce Davison	1535	2002/2003 season (100%)	0	0	0	0	0
20	CAN	Jessica Dube / Bryce Davison	1535	2001/2002 season (70%)	0	0	0	0	0
21	RUS	Viktoria Borzenkova / Andrei Chuvilaev	1533	2003/2004 season (100%)	0	275	250	0	0
21	RUS	Viktoria Borzenkova / Andrei Chuvilaev	1533	2002/2003 season (100%)	0	275	0	100	0
21	RUS	Viktoria Borzenkova / Andrei Chuvilaev	1533	2001/2002 season (70%)	441	192	0	0	0
22	RUS	Natalia Shestakova / Pavel Lebedev	1515	2003/2004 season (100%)	715	550	250	0	0
22	RUS	Natalia Shestakova / Pavel Lebedev	1515	2002/2003 season (100%)	0	0	0	0	0
22	RUS	Natalia Shestakova / Pavel Lebedev	1515	2001/2002 season (70%)	0	0	0	0	0
23	CZE	Veronika Havlickova / Karel Stefl	1499	2003/2004 season (100%)	490	0	0	0	0
23	CZE	Veronika Havlickova / Karel Stefl	1499	2002/2003 season (100%)	415	200	150	0	0
23	CZE	Veronika Havlickova / Karel Stefl	1499	2001/2002 season (70%)	290	122	122	0	0
24	RUS	Tatiana Kokareva / Egor Golovkin	1475	2003/2004 season (100%)	625	400	250	0	0
24	RUS	Tatiana Kokareva / Egor Golovkin	1475	2002/2003 season (100%)	0	200	0	0	0
24	RUS	Tatiana Kokareva / Egor Golovkin	1475	2001/2002 season (70%)	0	0	0	0	0
25	UKR	Julia Beloglazova / Andrei Bekh	1450	2003/2004 season (100%)	560	150	125	0	0
25	UKR	Julia Beloglazova / Andrei Bekh	1450	2002/2003 season (100%)	385	125	100	0	0
25	UKR	Julia Beloglazova / Andrei Bekh	1450	2001/2002 season (70%)	354	105	105	0	0
26	RUS	Maria Mukhortova / Maxim Trankov	1405	2003/2004 season (100%)	655	500	250	0	0
26	RUS	Maria Mukhortova / Maxim Trankov	1405	2002/2003 season (100%)	0	0	0	0	0
26	RUS	Maria Mukhortova / Maxim Trankov	1405	2001/2002 season (70%)	0	0	0	0	0
27	USA	Jennifer Don / Jonathon Hunt	1380	2003/2004 season (100%)	0	0	0	0	0
27	USA	Jennifer Don / Jonathon Hunt	1380	2002/2003 season (100%)	655	500	225	0	0
27	USA	Jennifer Don / Jonathon Hunt	1380	2001/2002 season (70%)	0	0	0	0	0
28	FRA	Marylin Pla / Yannick Bonheur	1370	2003/2004 season (100%)	595	225	0	0	0
28	FRA	Marylin Pla / Yannick Bonheur	1370	2002/2003 season (100%)	325	125	100	0	0
28	FRA	Marylin Pla / Yannick Bonheur	1370	2001/2002 season (70%)	0	0	0	0	0
29	RUS	Julia Obertas / Sergei Slavnov	1310	2003/2004 season (100%)	735	300	275	0	0
29	RUS	Julia Obertas / Sergei Slavnov	1310	2002/2003 season (100%)	0	0	0	0	0
29	RUS	Julia Obertas / Sergei Slavnov	1310	2001/2002 season (70%)	0	0	0	0	0
30	GER	Rebecca Handke / Daniel Wende	1155	2003/2004 season (100%)	525	100	100	0	0
30	GER	Rebecca Handke / Daniel Wende	1155	2002/2003 season (100%)	355	75	0	0	0
30	GER	Rebecca Handke / Daniel Wende	1155	2001/2002 season (70%)	0	0	0	0	0
31	USA	Andrea Varraux / David Pelletier	1130	2003/2004 season (100%)	505	300	250	0	0
31	USA	Andrea Varraux / David Pelletier	1130	2002/2003 season (100%)	0	75	0	0	0
31	USA	Andrea Varraux / David Pelletier	1130	2001/2002 season (70%)	0	0	0	0	0
32	RUS	Anastasia Kuzmina / Stanislav Evdokimov	1100	2003/2004 season (100%)	0	250	225	0	0
32	RUS	Anastasia Kuzmina / Stanislav Evdokimov	1100	2002/2003 season (100%)	0	400	225	0	0
32	RUS	Anastasia Kuzmina / Stanislav Evdokimov	1100	2001/2002 season (70%)	0	158	122	0	0
33	GER	Nicole Noennig / Matthias Bleyer	1095	2003/2004 season (100%)	0	275	0	0	0
33	GER	Nicole Noennig / Matthias Bleyer	1095	2002/2003 season (100%)	595	225	0	0	0
33	GER	Nicole Noennig / Matthias Bleyer	1095	2001/2002 season (70%)	0	0	0	0	0
34	UZB	Marina Aganina / Artem Knyazev	1050	2003/2004 season (100%)	525	0	0	0	0
34	UZB	Marina Aganina / Artem Knyazev	1050	2002/2003 season (100%)	525	0	0	0	0
34	UZB	Marina Aganina / Artem Knyazev	1050	2001/2002 season (70%)	175	0	0	0	0
35	USA	Brooke Castile / Benjamin Okolski	975	2003/2004 season (100%)	475	200	175	0	0
35	USA	Brooke Castile / Benjamin Okolski	975	2002/2003 season (100%)	0	125	0	0	0
35	USA	Brooke Castile / Benjamin Okolski	975	2001/2002 season (70%)	0	0	0	0	0
36	FRA	Sabrina Lefrancois / Jerome Blanchard	975	2003/2004 season (100%)	700	275	0	0	0
36	FRA	Sabrina Lefrancois / Jerome Blanchard	975	2002/2003 season (100%)	0	0	0	0	0
36	FRA	Sabrina Lefrancois / Jerome Blanchard	975	2001/2002 season (70%)	0	0	0	0	0
37	CAN	Utako Wakamatsu / Jean-Sebastien Fecteau	925	2003/2004 season (100%)	0	325	300	150	150
37	CAN	Utako Wakamatsu / Jean-Sebastien Fecteau	925	2002/2003 season (100%)	0	0	0	0	0
37	CAN	Utako Wakamatsu / Jean-Sebastien Fecteau	925	2001/2002 season (70%)	0	0	0	0	0
38	LAT	Olga Boguslavska / Andrei Brovenko	875	2003/2004 season (100%)	420	0	0	0	0
38	LAT	Olga Boguslavska / Andrei Brovenko	875	2002/2003 season (100%)	455	0	0	0	0
38	LAT	Olga Boguslavska / Andrei Brovenko	875	2001/2002 season (70%)	0	0	0	0	0
39	EST	Diana Rennik / Aleksei Saks	875	2003/2004 season (100%)	455	0	0	0	0
39	EST	Diana Rennik / Aleksei Saks	875	2002/2003 season (100%)	420	0	0	0	0
39	EST	Diana Rennik / Aleksei Saks	875	2001/2002 season (70%)	248	0	0	0	0
40	CAN	Terra Findlay / John Mattatal	820	2003/2004 season (100%)	445	200	175	0	0
40	CAN	Terra Findlay / John Mattatal	820	2002/2003 season (100%)	0	0	0	0	0
40	CAN	Terra Findlay / John Mattatal	820	2001/2002 season (70%)	0	0	0	0	0
41	USA	Amy Howerton / Steven Pottenger	775	2003/2004 season (100%)	0	225	200	0	0
41	USA	Amy Howerton / Steven Pottenger	775	2002/2003 season (100%)	0	200	150	0	0
41	USA	Amy Howerton / Steven Pottenger	775	2001/2002 season (70%)	0	0	0	0	0
42	SVK	Milica Brozovic / Vladimir Futáš	725	2003/2004 season (100%)	500	225	0	0	0
42	SVK	Milica Brozovic / Vladimir Futáš	725	2002/2003 season (100%)	0	0	0	0	0
42	SVK	Milica Brozovic / Vladimir Futáš	725	2001/2002 season (70%)	0	0	0	0	0
43	FRA	Cyriane Felden / Maxime Coia	660	2003/2004 season (100%)	385	150	125	0	0
43	FRA	Cyriane Felden / Maxime Coia	660	2002/2003 season (100%)	0	0	0	0	0
43	FRA	Cyriane Felden / Maxime Coia	660	2001/2002 season (70%)	0	0	0	0	0
44	USA	Colette Appel / Lee Harris	620	2003/2004 season (100%)	0	0	0	0	0
44	USA	Colette Appel / Lee Harris	620	2002/2003 season (100%)	0	175	175	0	0
44	USA	Colette Appel / Lee Harris	620	2001/2002 season (70%)	270	0	0	0	0
45	CAN	Michelle Cronin / Brian Shales	600	2003/2004 season (100%)	0	225	200	0	0
45	CAN	Michelle Cronin / Brian Shales	600	2002/2003 season (100%)	0	175	0	0	0
45	CAN	Michelle Cronin / Brian Shales	600	2001/2002 season (70%)	0	0	0	0	0
46	ISR	Julia Shapiro / Vadim Akolzin	600	2003/2004 season (100%)	450	75	75	0	0
46	ISR	Julia Shapiro / Vadim Akolzin	600	2002/2003 season (100%)	0	0	0	0	0
46	ISR	Julia Shapiro / Vadim Akolzin	600	2001/2002 season (70%)	0	0	0	0	0
47	UZB	Natalia Ponomareva / Evgeni Sviridov	420	2003/2004 season (100%)	0	0	0	0	0
47	UZB	Natalia Ponomareva / Evgeni Sviridov	420	2002/2003 season (100%)	0	0	0	0	0
47	UZB	Natalia Ponomareva / Evgeni Sviridov	420	2001/2002 season (70%)	245	175	0	0	0
48	CAN	Lindsay McCaustlin / Christopher Davies	405	2003/2004 season (100%)	0	0	0	0	0
48	CAN	Lindsay McCaustlin / Christopher Davies	405	2002/2003 season (100%)	0	150	150	0	0
48	CAN	Lindsay McCaustlin / Christopher Davies	405	2001/2002 season (70%)	0	105	0	0	0
49	USA	Brandilyn Sandoval / Laureano Ibarra	375	2003/2004 season (100%)	0	200	175	0	0
49	USA	Brandilyn Sandoval / Laureano Ibarra	375	2002/2003 season (100%)	0	0	0	0	0
49	USA	Brandilyn Sandoval / Laureano Ibarra	375	2001/2002 season (70%)	0	0	0	0	0
50	GBR	Tiffany Ann Sfikas / Andrew Seabrook	368	2003/2004 season (100%)	0	0	0	0	0
50	GBR	Tiffany Ann Sfikas / Andrew Seabrook	368	2002/2003 season (100%)	0	0	0	0	0
50	GBR	Tiffany Ann Sfikas / Andrew Seabrook	368	2001/2002 season (70%)	368	0	0	0	0
51	UKR	Victoria Maxiuta / Vitali Dubina	350	2003/2004 season (100%)	0	0	0	0	0
51	UKR	Victoria Maxiuta / Vitali Dubina	350	2002/2003 season (100%)	0	0	0	0	0
51	UKR	Victoria Maxiuta / Vitali Dubina	350	2001/2002 season (70%)	0	192	158	0	0
52	UKR	Aliona Savchenko / Stanislav Morozov	350	2003/2004 season (100%)	0	0	0	0	0
52	UKR	Aliona Savchenko / Stanislav Morozov	350	2002/2003 season (100%)	0	0	0	0	0
52	UKR	Aliona Savchenko / Stanislav Morozov	350	2001/2002 season (70%)	350	0	0	0	0
53	EST	Viktoria Shklover / Valdis Mintals	343	2003/2004 season (100%)	0	0	0	0	0
53	EST	Viktoria Shklover / Valdis Mintals	343	2002/2003 season (100%)	0	0	0	0	0
53	EST	Viktoria Shklover / Valdis Mintals	343	2001/2002 season (70%)	343	0	0	0	0
54	GBR	Rebecca Collett / Hamish Gaman	325	2003/2004 season (100%)	325	0	0	0	0
54	GBR	Rebecca Collett / Hamish Gaman	325	2002/2003 season (100%)	0	0	0	0	0
54	GBR	Rebecca Collett / Hamish Gaman	325	2001/2002 season (70%)	0	0	0	0	0
55	USA	Lucy Galleher / John Coughlin	325	2003/2004 season (100%)	0	175	150	0	0
55	USA	Lucy Galleher / John Coughlin	325	2002/2003 season (100%)	0	0	0	0	0
55	USA	Lucy Galleher / John Coughlin	325	2001/2002 season (70%)	0	0	0	0	0
56	ITA	Michela Cobisi / Ruben De Pra	318	2003/2004 season (100%)	0	0	0	0	0
56	ITA	Michela Cobisi / Ruben De Pra	318	2002/2003 season (100%)	0	0	0	0	0
56	ITA	Michela Cobisi / Ruben De Pra	318	2001/2002 season (70%)	318	0	0	0	0
57	POL	Dominika Piatkowska / Alexandr Levintsov	315	2003/2004 season (100%)	0	0	0	0	0
57	POL	Dominika Piatkowska / Alexandr Levintsov	315	2002/2003 season (100%)	0	0	0	0	0
57	POL	Dominika Piatkowska / Alexandr Levintsov	315	2001/2002 season (70%)	227	88	0	0	0
58	CAN	Daylan Hoffmann / Cody Hay	300	2003/2004 season (100%)	0	150	150	0	0
58	CAN	Daylan Hoffmann / Cody Hay	300	2002/2003 season (100%)	0	0	0	0	0
58	CAN	Daylan Hoffmann / Cody Hay	300	2001/2002 season (70%)	0	0	0	0	0
59	SVK	Olga Bestandigova / Jozef Bestandig	294	2003/2004 season (100%)	0	0	0	0	0
59	SVK	Olga Bestandigova / Jozef Bestandig	294	2002/2003 season (100%)	0	0	0	0	0
59	SVK	Olga Bestandigova / Jozef Bestandig	294	2001/2002 season (70%)	294	0	0	0	0
60	BUL	Rumiana Spassova / Stanimir Todorov	290	2003/2004 season (100%)	0	0	0	0	0
60	BUL	Rumiana Spassova / Stanimir Todorov	290	2002/2003 season (100%)	265	25	0	0	0
60	BUL	Rumiana Spassova / Stanimir Todorov	290	2001/2002 season (70%)	0	0	0	0	0

==== Ice dance (60 couples) ====
As of 26 March 2004

Rank	Nation	Couple	Points	Season	ISU Championships or Olympics	(Junior) Grand Prix and Final		Selected International Competition	
Rank	Nation	Couple	Points	Season	Best	Best	2nd Best	Best	2nd Best
1	BUL	Albena Denkova / Maxim Staviski	4755	2003/2004 season (100%)	1150	750	400	150	0
1	BUL	Albena Denkova / Maxim Staviski	4755	2002/2003 season (100%)	1100	700	400	0	0
1	BUL	Albena Denkova / Maxim Staviski	4755	2001/2002 season (70%)	700	245	227	105	0
2	RUS	Tatiana Navka / Roman Kostomarov	4575	2003/2004 season (100%)	1200	800	400	0	0
2	RUS	Tatiana Navka / Roman Kostomarov	4575	2002/2003 season (100%)	1050	750	375	0	0
2	RUS	Tatiana Navka / Roman Kostomarov	4575	2001/2002 season (70%)	595	227	227	0	0
3	UKR	Elena Grushina / Ruslan Goncharov	4125	2003/2004 season (100%)	1050	650	375	0	0
3	UKR	Elena Grushina / Ruslan Goncharov	4125	2002/2003 season (100%)	1000	650	400	0	0
3	UKR	Elena Grushina / Ruslan Goncharov	4125	2001/2002 season (70%)	665	245	210	0	0
4	USA	Tanith Belbin / Benjamin Agosto	3700	2003/2004 season (100%)	1000	700	400	0	0
4	USA	Tanith Belbin / Benjamin Agosto	3700	2002/2003 season (100%)	900	350	350	0	0
4	USA	Tanith Belbin / Benjamin Agosto	3700	2001/2002 season (70%)	564	210	192	0	0
5	ISR	Galit Chait / Sergei Sakhnovski	3595	2003/2004 season (100%)	900	350	350	0	0
5	ISR	Galit Chait / Sergei Sakhnovski	3595	2002/2003 season (100%)	950	600	375	0	0
5	ISR	Galit Chait / Sergei Sakhnovski	3595	2001/2002 season (70%)	770	420	262	0	0
6	CAN	Marie-France Dubreuil / Patrice Lauzon	3460	2003/2004 season (100%)	850	550	375	0	0
6	CAN	Marie-France Dubreuil / Patrice Lauzon	3460	2002/2003 season (100%)	750	550	375	0	0
6	CAN	Marie-France Dubreuil / Patrice Lauzon	3460	2001/2002 season (70%)	525	385	262	0	0
7	FRA	Isabelle Delobel / Olivier Schoenfelder	3400	2003/2004 season (100%)	950	600	350	0	0
7	FRA	Isabelle Delobel / Olivier Schoenfelder	3400	2002/2003 season (100%)	800	375	325	0	0
7	FRA	Isabelle Delobel / Olivier Schoenfelder	3400	2001/2002 season (70%)	455	245	210	0	0
8	HUN	Nóra Hoffmann / Attila Elek	3200	2003/2004 season (100%)	685	600	250	150	0
8	HUN	Nóra Hoffmann / Attila Elek	3200	2002/2003 season (100%)	685	550	250	0	0
8	HUN	Nóra Hoffmann / Attila Elek	3200	2001/2002 season (70%)	416	280	158	0	0
9	RUS	Irina Lobacheva / Ilia Averbukh	3190	2003/2004 season (100%)	0	0	0	0	0
9	RUS	Irina Lobacheva / Ilia Averbukh	3190	2002/2003 season (100%)	1150	800	400	0	0
9	RUS	Irina Lobacheva / Ilia Averbukh	3190	2001/2002 season (70%)	840	0	0	0	0
10	GER	Kati Winkler / René Lohse	3175	2003/2004 season (100%)	1100	325	325	0	0
10	GER	Kati Winkler / René Lohse	3175	2002/2003 season (100%)	700	375	350	0	0
10	GER	Kati Winkler / René Lohse	3175	2001/2002 season (70%)	630	0	0	0	0
11	RUS	Elena Romanovskaya / Alexander Grachev	3055	2003/2004 season (100%)	715	550	250	0	0
11	RUS	Elena Romanovskaya / Alexander Grachev	3055	2002/2003 season (100%)	655	500	250	0	0
11	RUS	Elena Romanovskaya / Alexander Grachev	3055	2001/2002 season (70%)	458	385	175	0	0
12	ITA	Federica Faiella / Massimo Scali	3015	2003/2004 season (100%)	800	325	300	0	0
12	ITA	Federica Faiella / Massimo Scali	3015	2002/2003 season (100%)	700	300	300	150	0
12	ITA	Federica Faiella / Massimo Scali	3015	2001/2002 season (70%)	318	175	0	70	70
13	RUS	Oksana Domnina / Maxim Shabalin	2965	2003/2004 season (100%)	750	275	275	100	0
13	RUS	Oksana Domnina / Maxim Shabalin	2965	2002/2003 season (100%)	715	600	250	0	0
13	RUS	Oksana Domnina / Maxim Shabalin	2965	2001/2002 season (70%)	0	0	0	0	0
14	USA	Melissa Gregory / Denis Petukhov	2650	2003/2004 season (100%)	735	325	300	0	0
14	USA	Melissa Gregory / Denis Petukhov	2650	2002/2003 season (100%)	665	300	225	100	0
14	USA	Melissa Gregory / Denis Petukhov	2650	2001/2002 season (70%)	0	0	0	0	0
15	CAN	Megan Wing / Aaron Lowe	2620	2003/2004 season (100%)	770	300	300	0	0
15	CAN	Megan Wing / Aaron Lowe	2620	2002/2003 season (100%)	700	275	275	0	0
15	CAN	Megan Wing / Aaron Lowe	2620	2001/2002 season (70%)	539	192	192	0	0
16	RUS	Natalia Mikhailova / Arkadi Sergeev	2440	2003/2004 season (100%)	625	450	250	0	0
16	RUS	Natalia Mikhailova / Arkadi Sergeev	2440	2002/2003 season (100%)	565	300	250	0	0
16	RUS	Natalia Mikhailova / Arkadi Sergeev	2440	2001/2002 season (70%)	0	122	70	0	0
17	ISR	Natalia Gudina / Alexei Beletski	2285	2003/2004 season (100%)	560	275	250	0	0
17	ISR	Natalia Gudina / Alexei Beletski	2285	2002/2003 season (100%)	550	300	300	50	0
17	ISR	Natalia Gudina / Alexei Beletski	2285	2001/2002 season (70%)	245	0	0	0	0
18	USA	Morgan Matthews / Maxim Zavozin	2195	2003/2004 season (100%)	655	500	250	0	0
18	USA	Morgan Matthews / Maxim Zavozin	2195	2002/2003 season (100%)	415	200	175	0	0
18	USA	Morgan Matthews / Maxim Zavozin	2195	2001/2002 season (70%)	0	0	0	0	0
19	AZE	Kristin Fraser / Igor Lukanin	2075	2003/2004 season (100%)	450	250	250	0	0
19	AZE	Kristin Fraser / Igor Lukanin	2075	2002/2003 season (100%)	600	275	250	0	0
19	AZE	Kristin Fraser / Igor Lukanin	2075	2001/2002 season (70%)	350	0	0	0	0
20	ISR	Alexandra Zaretski / Roman Zaretski	1980	2003/2004 season (100%)	475	350	250	0	0
20	ISR	Alexandra Zaretski / Roman Zaretski	1980	2002/2003 season (100%)	505	200	200	0	0
20	ISR	Alexandra Zaretski / Roman Zaretski	1980	2001/2002 season (70%)	122	52	0	0	0
21	GER	Christina Beier / William Beier	1975	2003/2004 season (100%)	315	225	0	0	0
21	GER	Christina Beier / William Beier	1975	2002/2003 season (100%)	595	450	250	0	0
21	GER	Christina Beier / William Beier	1975	2001/2002 season (70%)	290	140	122	0	0
22	UKR	Anna Zadorozhniuk / Sergei Verbillo	1939	2003/2004 season (100%)	535	400	250	0	0
22	UKR	Anna Zadorozhniuk / Sergei Verbillo	1939	2002/2003 season (100%)	295	225	125	0	0
22	UKR	Anna Zadorozhniuk / Sergei Verbillo	1939	2001/2002 season (70%)	354	175	158	0	0
23	JPN	Nozomi Watanabe / Akiyuki Kido	1935	2003/2004 season (100%)	700	225	225	0	0
23	JPN	Nozomi Watanabe / Akiyuki Kido	1935	2002/2003 season (100%)	560	225	0	0	0
23	JPN	Nozomi Watanabe / Akiyuki Kido	1935	2001/2002 season (70%)	392	0	0	0	0
24	USA	Loren Galler-Rabinowitz / David Mitchell	1922	2003/2004 season (100%)	595	250	0	0	0
24	USA	Loren Galler-Rabinowitz / David Mitchell	1922	2002/2003 season (100%)	625	200	200	0	0
24	USA	Loren Galler-Rabinowitz / David Mitchell	1922	2001/2002 season (70%)	270	52	0	0	0
25	UKR	Mariana Kozlova / Sergei Baranov	1895	2003/2004 season (100%)	0	0	0	0	0
25	UKR	Mariana Kozlova / Sergei Baranov	1895	2002/2003 season (100%)	535	400	225	0	0
25	UKR	Mariana Kozlova / Sergei Baranov	1895	2001/2002 season (70%)	332	245	158	0	0
26	POL	Sylwia Nowak / Sebastian Kolasinski	1835	2003/2004 season (100%)	0	0	0	0	0
26	POL	Sylwia Nowak / Sebastian Kolasinski	1835	2002/2003 season (100%)	560	300	275	0	0
26	POL	Sylwia Nowak / Sebastian Kolasinski	1835	2001/2002 season (70%)	490	0	0	105	105
27	UKR	Julia Golovina / Oleg Voiko	1738	2003/2004 season (100%)	350	225	0	0	0
27	UKR	Julia Golovina / Oleg Voiko	1738	2002/2003 season (100%)	350	225	0	150	0
27	UKR	Julia Golovina / Oleg Voiko	1738	2001/2002 season (70%)	172	175	158	105	0
28	FRA	Roxane Petetin / Mathieu Jost	1735	2003/2004 season (100%)	455	275	225	0	0
28	FRA	Roxane Petetin / Mathieu Jost	1735	2002/2003 season (100%)	280	275	225	0	0
28	FRA	Roxane Petetin / Mathieu Jost	1735	2001/2002 season (70%)	147	0	0	0	0
29	ITA	Alessia Aureli / Andrea Vaturi	1615	2003/2004 season (100%)	175	0	0	0	0
29	ITA	Alessia Aureli / Andrea Vaturi	1615	2002/2003 season (100%)	475	350	250	0	0
29	ITA	Alessia Aureli / Andrea Vaturi	1615	2001/2002 season (70%)	312	140	88	0	0
30	RUS	Ekaterina Rubleva / Ivan Shefer	1565	2003/2004 season (100%)	565	300	225	0	0
30	RUS	Ekaterina Rubleva / Ivan Shefer	1565	2002/2003 season (100%)	0	250	225	0	0
30	RUS	Ekaterina Rubleva / Ivan Shefer	1565	2001/2002 season (70%)	0	122	105	0	0
31	ITA	Barbara Fusar Poli / Maurizio Margaglio	1505	2003/2004 season (100%)	0	0	0	0	0
31	ITA	Barbara Fusar Poli / Maurizio Margaglio	1505	2002/2003 season (100%)	0	0	0	0	0
31	ITA	Barbara Fusar Poli / Maurizio Margaglio	1505	2001/2002 season (70%)	770	455	280	0	0
32	CZE	Petra Pachlova / Petr Knoth	1500	2003/2004 season (100%)	445	200	150	0	0
32	CZE	Petra Pachlova / Petr Knoth	1500	2002/2003 season (100%)	355	175	175	0	0
32	CZE	Petra Pachlova / Petr Knoth	1500	2001/2002 season (70%)	38	105	35	0	0
33	FRA	Nathalie Pechalat / Fabian Bourzat	1489	2003/2004 season (100%)	250	250	225	0	0
33	FRA	Nathalie Pechalat / Fabian Bourzat	1489	2002/2003 season (100%)	0	0	0	0	0
33	FRA	Nathalie Pechalat / Fabian Bourzat	1489	2001/2002 season (70%)	396	210	158	0	0
34	GER	Miriam Steinel / Vladimir Tsvetkov	1488	2003/2004 season (100%)	0	0	0	0	0
34	GER	Miriam Steinel / Vladimir Tsvetkov	1488	2002/2003 season (100%)	0	275	250	0	0
34	GER	Miriam Steinel / Vladimir Tsvetkov	1488	2001/2002 season (70%)	438	350	175	0	0
35	LTU	Margarita Drobiazko / Povilas Vanagas	1487	2003/2004 season (100%)	0	0	0	0	0
35	LTU	Margarita Drobiazko / Povilas Vanagas	1487	2002/2003 season (100%)	0	0	0	0	0
35	LTU	Margarita Drobiazko / Povilas Vanagas	1487	2001/2002 season (70%)	735	490	262	0	0
36	USA	Naomi Lang / Peter Tchernyshev	1438	2003/2004 season (100%)	0	0	0	0	0
36	USA	Naomi Lang / Peter Tchernyshev	1438	2002/2003 season (100%)	850	0	0	0	0
36	USA	Naomi Lang / Peter Tchernyshev	1438	2001/2002 season (70%)	588	0	0	0	0
37	CAN	Josée Piché / Pascal Denis	1420	2003/2004 season (100%)	630	300	0	0	0
37	CAN	Josée Piché / Pascal Denis	1420	2002/2003 season (100%)	0	0	0	0	0
37	CAN	Josée Piché / Pascal Denis	1420	2001/2002 season (70%)	490	0	0	0	0
38	CHN	Weina Zhang / Xianming Cao	1320	2003/2004 season (100%)	0	0	0	0	0
38	CHN	Weina Zhang / Xianming Cao	1320	2002/2003 season (100%)	630	225	0	0	0
38	CHN	Weina Zhang / Xianming Cao	1320	2001/2002 season (70%)	465	0	0	0	0
39	RUS	Svetlana Kulikova / Vitali Novikov	1300	2003/2004 season (100%)	600	300	250	150	0
39	RUS	Svetlana Kulikova / Vitali Novikov	1300	2002/2003 season (100%)	0	0	0	0	0
39	RUS	Svetlana Kulikova / Vitali Novikov	1300	2001/2002 season (70%)	0	0	0	0	0
40	ITA	Anna Cappellini / Matteo Zanni	1265	2003/2004 season (100%)	595	200	200	0	0
40	ITA	Anna Cappellini / Matteo Zanni	1265	2002/2003 season (100%)	145	125	0	0	0
40	ITA	Anna Cappellini / Matteo Zanni	1265	2001/2002 season (70%)	0	0	0	0	0
41	CHN	Fang Yang / Chongbo Gao	1190	2003/2004 season (100%)	665	0	0	0	0
41	CHN	Fang Yang / Chongbo Gao	1190	2002/2003 season (100%)	525	0	0	0	0
41	CHN	Fang Yang / Chongbo Gao	1190	2001/2002 season (70%)	0	0	0	0	0
42	CHN	Xiaoyang Yu / Chen Wang	1090	2003/2004 season (100%)	525	0	0	0	0
42	CHN	Xiaoyang Yu / Chen Wang	1090	2002/2003 season (100%)	490	75	0	0	0
42	CHN	Xiaoyang Yu / Chen Wang	1090	2001/2002 season (70%)	0	0	0	0	0
43	GBR	Marika Humphreys / Vitali Baranov	1082	2003/2004 season (100%)	0	0	0	0	0
43	GBR	Marika Humphreys / Vitali Baranov	1082	2002/2003 season (100%)	0	250	0	150	0
43	GBR	Marika Humphreys / Vitali Baranov	1082	2001/2002 season (70%)	385	192	0	70	35
44	CZE	Veronika Moravkova / Jiří Procházka	1015	2003/2004 season (100%)	0	0	0	0	0
44	CZE	Veronika Moravkova / Jiří Procházka	1015	2002/2003 season (100%)	450	250	0	0	0
44	CZE	Veronika Moravkova / Jiří Procházka	1015	2001/2002 season (70%)	245	0	0	70	0
45	CHN	Jia Qi / Xu Sun	1008	2003/2004 season (100%)	490	100	0	0	0
45	CHN	Jia Qi / Xu Sun	1008	2002/2003 season (100%)	0	50	0	0	0
45	CHN	Jia Qi / Xu Sun	1008	2001/2002 season (70%)	368	0	0	0	0
46	CAN	Melissa Piperno / Liam Dougherty	950	2003/2004 season (100%)	0	0	0	0	0
46	CAN	Melissa Piperno / Liam Dougherty	950	2002/2003 season (100%)	445	200	200	0	0
46	CAN	Melissa Piperno / Liam Dougherty	950	2001/2002 season (70%)	0	105	0	0	0
47	USA	Meryl Davis / Charlie White	905	2003/2004 season (100%)	355	175	175	0	0
47	USA	Meryl Davis / Charlie White	905	2002/2003 season (100%)	0	125	75	0	0
47	USA	Meryl Davis / Charlie White	905	2001/2002 season (70%)	0	0	0	0	0
48	CAN	Lauren Senft / Leif Gislason	880	2003/2004 season (100%)	505	200	175	0	0
48	CAN	Lauren Senft / Leif Gislason	880	2002/2003 season (100%)	0	0	0	0	0
48	CAN	Lauren Senft / Leif Gislason	880	2001/2002 season (70%)	0	0	0	0	0
49	RUS	Olga Orlova / Maxim Bolotin	850	2003/2004 season (100%)	0	250	225	0	0
49	RUS	Olga Orlova / Maxim Bolotin	850	2002/2003 season (100%)	0	225	150	0	0
49	RUS	Olga Orlova / Maxim Bolotin	850	2001/2002 season (70%)	0	0	0	0	0
50	FRA	Pernelle Carron / Edouard Dezutter	770	2003/2004 season (100%)	295	150	125	0	0
50	FRA	Pernelle Carron / Edouard Dezutter	770	2002/2003 season (100%)	0	125	75	0	0
50	FRA	Pernelle Carron / Edouard Dezutter	770	2001/2002 season (70%)	0	35	35	0	0
51	AUS	Natalie Buck / Trent Nelson-Bond	749	2003/2004 season (100%)	455	0	0	0	0
51	AUS	Natalie Buck / Trent Nelson-Bond	749	2002/2003 season (100%)	0	0	0	0	0
51	AUS	Natalie Buck / Trent Nelson-Bond	749	2001/2002 season (70%)	294	0	0	0	0
52	CAN	Tessa Virtue / Scott Moir	715	2003/2004 season (100%)	415	175	125	0	0
52	CAN	Tessa Virtue / Scott Moir	715	2002/2003 season (100%)	0	0	0	0	0
52	CAN	Tessa Virtue / Scott Moir	715	2001/2002 season (70%)	0	0	0	0	0
53	CAN	Siobhan Karam / Joshua McGrath	700	2003/2004 season (100%)	0	175	175	0	0
53	CAN	Siobhan Karam / Joshua McGrath	700	2002/2003 season (100%)	0	200	150	0	0
53	CAN	Siobhan Karam / Joshua McGrath	700	2001/2002 season (70%)	0	0	0	0	0
54	SUI	Eliane Hugentobler / Daniel Hugentobler	672	2003/2004 season (100%)	0	0	0	0	0
54	SUI	Eliane Hugentobler / Daniel Hugentobler	672	2002/2003 season (100%)	0	0	0	0	0
54	SUI	Eliane Hugentobler / Daniel Hugentobler	672	2001/2002 season (70%)	392	210	0	70	0
55	GBR	Sinead Kerr / John Kerr	650	2003/2004 season (100%)	550	0	0	100	0
55	GBR	Sinead Kerr / John Kerr	650	2002/2003 season (100%)	0	0	0	0	0
55	GBR	Sinead Kerr / John Kerr	650	2001/2002 season (70%)	0	0	0	0	0
56	ARM	Anastasia Grebenkina / Vazgen Azrojan	620	2003/2004 season (100%)	420	0	0	150	0
56	ARM	Anastasia Grebenkina / Vazgen Azrojan	620	2002/2003 season (100%)	50	0	0	0	0
56	ARM	Anastasia Grebenkina / Vazgen Azrojan	620	2001/2002 season (70%)	0	0	0	0	0
57	UKR	Alla Beknazarova / Vladimir Zuev	560	2003/2004 season (100%)	385	175	0	0	0
57	UKR	Alla Beknazarova / Vladimir Zuev	560	2002/2003 season (100%)	0	0	0	0	0
57	UKR	Alla Beknazarova / Vladimir Zuev	560	2001/2002 season (70%)	0	0	0	0	0
57	JPN	Nakako Tsuzuki / Kenji Miyamoto	560	2003/2004 season (100%)	560	0	0	0	0
57	JPN	Nakako Tsuzuki / Kenji Miyamoto	560	2002/2003 season (100%)	0	0	0	0	0
57	JPN	Nakako Tsuzuki / Kenji Miyamoto	560	2001/2002 season (70%)	0	0	0	0	0
59	USA	Carly Donowick / Leo Ungar	550	2003/2004 season (100%)	0	150	150	0	0
59	USA	Carly Donowick / Leo Ungar	550	2002/2003 season (100%)	0	150	100	0	0
59	USA	Carly Donowick / Leo Ungar	550	2001/2002 season (70%)	0	0	0	0	0
60	AUT	Barbara Herzog / Dmitri Matsjuk	545	2003/2004 season (100%)	280	0	0	0	0
60	AUT	Barbara Herzog / Dmitri Matsjuk	545	2002/2003 season (100%)	265	0	0	0	0
60	AUT	Barbara Herzog / Dmitri Matsjuk	545	2001/2002 season (70%)	0	0	0	0	0

== See also ==
- ISU World Standings
- 2003–04 figure skating season
