= Vanessa James =

Canadian pair skater (born 1987)

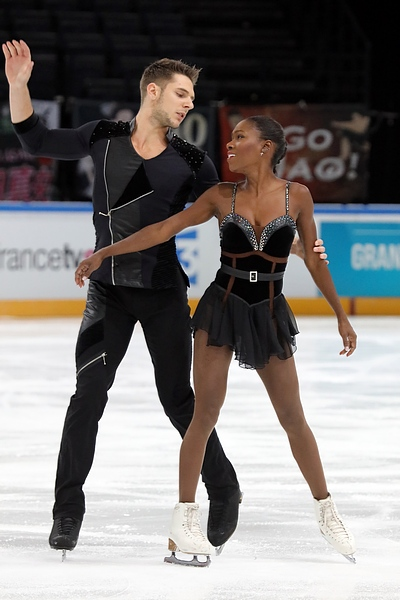
- James and Ciprès at the 2016 Trophée de France

Personal information
- Born: 27 September 1987 (age 39) Scarborough, Ontario, Canada
- Home town: Montreal, Quebec, Canada
- Height: 1.61 m (5 ft 3 in)

Figure skating career
- Country: Canada (2021–22); France (2008–19); Great Britain (2005–08); United States (2002–05)
- Discipline: Pair skating (2008–22); Women's singles (2002–08)
- Partner: Eric Radford (2021–22); Morgan Ciprès (2011–19); Yannick Bonheur (2008–10)
- Began skating: 1998
- Highest WS: 6th (2016–17 & 2017–18)
Event	Gold medal – first place	Silver medal – second place	Bronze medal – third place
World Championships	0	0	2
European Championships	1	0	1
Grand Prix Final	1	0	0
French Championships	7	1	0
Medal list
representing France
World Championships
Bronze medal – third place	2019 Saitama	Pairs
European Championships
Gold medal – first place	2019 Minsk	Pairs
Bronze medal – third place	2017 Ostrava	Pairs
Grand Prix Final
Gold medal – first place	2018–19 Vancouver	Pairs
French Championships
Gold medal – first place	2010 Marseille	Pairs
Gold medal – first place	2013 Strasbourg	Pairs
Gold medal – first place	2014 Vaujany	Pairs
Gold medal – first place	2015 Megève	Pairs
Gold medal – first place	2016 Épinal	Pairs
Gold medal – first place	2017 Caen	Pairs
Gold medal – first place	2019 Vaujany	Pairs
Silver medal – second place	2012 Dammarie-les-Lys	Pairs
Medal list
representing Canada
World Championships
Bronze medal – third place	2022 Montpellier	Pairs

Vanessa James Amoros (née James; born 27 September 1987) is a Canadian retired pair skater. Representing France with her former skating partner, Morgan Ciprès, she is the 2019 European Champion, the 2018 World bronze medallist, the 2017 European bronze medallist, the 2018 Grand Prix Final champion, and a six-time French national champion. They have also won medals in Grand Prix and Challenger Series competitions. James and Ciprès competed at the 2014 and 2018 Winter Olympics.

With her previous partner Yannick Bonheur, James represented France at the 2010 Winter Olympics, placing fourteenth. She also competed as a ladies' singles skater representing the United States and Great Britain; she is the 2006 British national champion in ladies' singles.

In April 2021, James announced the formation of a new partnership with Eric Radford, representing Canada. They represented Canada at the 2022 Winter Olympics and were the bronze medalists at the 2022 World Championships, before retiring.

== Personal life ==
Vanessa James was born in Scarborough, Ontario, Canada. She lived in Bermuda until age 10 when her family moved to Virginia in the United States. She lived in the U.S. through 2007, holding an American permanent residence card, and then moved to Paris, France. Her father is from Bermuda, which enabled James to hold British citizenship. She became a French citizen in December 2009. Her twin sister, Melyssa James, has also competed in figure skating. James' hobbies include tennis, dancing, and reading.

In 2024, she married French national judo champion Jordan Amoros.

== Career ==
=== Early years ===
Vanessa James began skating with her sister after watching the 1998 Winter Olympics. She originally competed domestically in the United States and represented the Washington Figure Skating Club.

In 2005, James began representing Great Britain internationally. She won gold at the 2006 British Championships and silver in 2007, becoming Britain's first black figure skating champion. She competed for Britain on the 2006 ISU Junior Grand Prix and at the 2007 World Junior Championships. Her last event as a singles skater was the 2007 International Cup of Nice, where she won the bronze medal.

In late 2007, James switched to pair skating, partnering briefly with British skater Hamish Gaman. She teamed up with French skater Yannick Bonheur in December 2007, after a three-day tryout in Paris.

=== 2008–2009 season: Debut of James/Bonheur ===
Making their international debut, James/Bonheur placed seventh in November at their Grand Prix assignment, the 2008 Trophée Eric Bompard. They ranked tenth at the 2009 European Championships, which took place in January in Helsinki, Finland.

In March, James/Bonheur finished twelfth at the 2009 World Championships in Los Angeles, California, United States. Due to their result, France qualified a spot in the pairs' event at the next Olympics. In April, they competed at the 2009 World Team Trophy in Tokyo, Japan.

=== 2009–2010 season: Vancouver Olympics ===
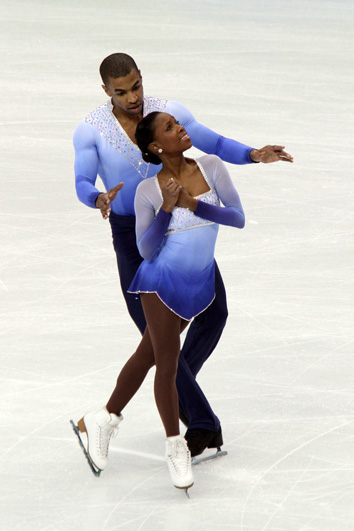
James and Bonheur at the 2010 Olympics

James/Bonheur opened their season at the 2009 Nebelhorn Trophy, where they placed 6th. They were invited to two Grand Prix events, the 2009 Cup of China and 2009 Trophée Eric Bompard, and finished eighth at both. They ranked second in the short program and first in the free skate at the 2010 French Championships. They won the title, outscoring the silver medalists Adeline Canac / Maximin Coia by 3.69 points.

In January, James/Bonheur placed seventh at the 2010 European Championships in Tallinn, Estonia. In February, they represented France at the 2010 Winter Olympics in Vancouver, British Columbia, Canada; they placed fifteenth in the short program, fourteenth in the free skate, and fourteenth overall. James/Bonheur were the first black pair to compete at the Olympics. Their final competition together was the 2010 World Championships, held in March in Turin, Italy. They placed tenth in the short, thirteenth in the free, and twelfth overall. They ended their partnership in the spring of 2010. James later recalled that they "weren't progressing, and we weren't able to work well together anymore."

=== 2010–2011 season ===
In May 2010, James had a successful tryout with Maximin Coia, and the two agreed to train in Germany with Ingo Steuer, but several weeks later, Coia decided to end his amateur career.

In September 2010, James began a partnership with Morgan Ciprès, until then, a singles skater. They made no competitive appearances in their first season as Ciprès learned pairs elements. Eight years later, James recalled the beginning of her partnership: "I remember our 3-day trial, and it was so fun. He was so funny because he had never done pairs before, so he was really nervous and saying 'oh my gosh, oh my gosh' every time he threw me. I knew that we were going to be good friends."

=== 2011–2012 season: Debut of James/Ciprès ===
James/Ciprès made their competitive debut in late September 2011, finishing fifth at the 2011 Ondrej Nepela Memorial. After placing fifth at the 2011 Coupe de Nice, the pair finished eighth at their first Grand Prix together, the 2011 Trophee Eric Bompard. At the 2012 French Championships, they ranked first in the short program and second in the free skate. With a total score 8.92 points lower than Daria Popova / Bruno Massot, James/Ciprès received the silver medal.

Finishing sixth overall, James/Ciprès were the best French pair (outscoring Popova/Massot by almost 12 points) at the 2012 European Championships in Sheffield, England. They were granted France's lone spot in pairs at the 2012 World Championships in Nice, France. The two qualified to the final segment in Nice and finished sixteenth overall.

=== 2012–2013 season ===
James/Ciprès won the bronze medal at the 2012 Nebelhorn Trophy—their first international medal as a pair. Their 2012 Grand Prix assignments were Skate America, where they placed fourth, and the Trophee Eric Bompard, where they came in sixth. James/Ciprès won another international medal at the 2012 NRW Trophy and followed that with their first national title in December.

In January, James/Ciprès came in fourth at the 2013 European Championships in Zagreb, Croatia. After taking gold at the 2013 International Challenge Cup, they placed eighth at the 2013 World Championships in London, Ontario. Due to their result in Canada, they qualified a spot for France in the pairs' event at the Sochi Olympics.

=== 2013–2014 season: Sochi Olympics ===
James/Ciprès were again assigned to Skate America and the Trophee Eric Bompard. Ciprès underwent surgery after a wrist injury and had to avoid lifts for a period, causing the pair to withdraw from Skate America. They were able to compete at the Trophee Eric Bompard and placed fifth. The pair then successfully defended their national title.

At the 2014 Europeans, James/Ciprès set personal best scores in both segments of the competition and came in fifth. They were named in the French team to the 2014 Winter Olympics in Sochi, where they placed tenth in the pairs event and sixth in the team event. They repeated their results at the 2014 World Championships.

=== 2014–2015 season ===
James/Ciprès finished fourth at the 2014 CS Nebelhorn Trophy and fifth at both of their Grand Prix assignments, the 2014 Skate Canada International and 2014 Trophée Éric Bompard.

They placed third in the short program, earning a small medal, their first, and fifth overall at the 2015 European Championships in Stockholm. They placed ninth at the 2015 World Championships in Shanghai. The two later competed at the 2015 World Team Trophy in Tokyo, where they placed fifth individually and sixth as a team.

=== 2015–2016 season: First Grand Prix medal ===
James/Ciprès began their season with a bronze medal at the 2015 CS Nebelhorn Trophy. They placed second in the short program at the 2015 Trophée Éric Bompard before the event's cancellation due to the November 2015 Paris attacks. The ISU deemed those placements the final results, awarding James/Ciprès their first Grand Prix medal, silver.

The pair finished fourth at the 2016 European Championships in Bratislava and tenth at the 2016 World Championships in Boston. At the end of the season, they concluded that they needed a major change if they were to continue competing. James said, "either we improve, or we stop. There was no point in anything else."

=== 2016–2017 season: European bronze medal ===
In June 2016, James/Ciprès relocated to Coral Springs, Florida to be coached by John Zimmerman and Jeremy Barrett. After taking silver at the 2016 CS Autumn Classic International, the pair competed at two Grand Prix events; they finished fourth at the 2016 Skate America and won the bronze medal at the 2016 Trophée de France.

In January 2017, James/Ciprès won the bronze medal at the European Championships in Ostrava, Czech Republic, becoming the first French pair in fourteen years to medal at the event (since 2003, when Sarah Abitbol / Stéphane Bernadis took silver).

In March, James/Ciprès placed tenth in the short program, sixth in the free skate, and eighth overall at the 2017 World Championships in Helsinki, Finland. The following month, they competed as part of Team France at the 2017 World Team Trophy in Tokyo, Japan; although their team finished sixth overall, the pair scored personal bests and placed first in both segments of the pairs' event, ahead of Russia's Evgenia Tarasova / Vladimir Morozov.

James reflected on their team's progress, "Our main problem [before] was that we were two different people on the ice. We needed to change that and to increase the connection between the two of us."

=== 2017–2018 season: PyeongChang Olympics and World bronze medal ===
James/Ciprès began their season with gold at the 2017 CS Autumn Classic International. They then won medals at both of their Grand Prix assignments, taking bronze at the 2017 Skate Canada International and silver at the 2017 Internationaux de France. They finished as the first alternates for the Grand Prix Final. At the 2018 European Championships in Moscow, the pair placed first in the short program, fourth in the free skate, and fourth overall—0.01 shy of the podium. They received a small gold medal for their short program.

James/Ciprès were named to France's delegation to the 2018 Winter Olympics, which took place in February in Pyeongchang, South Korea. During the team event, they placed sixth in their segment and Team France finished tenth. In the regular pairs event, they placed sixth in the short, fifth in the free, and fifth overall. In March, they became the first French pair in 18 years to stand on the World podium (since 2000), winning the bronze medal at the 2018 World Championships in Milan, Italy. James, reflecting on the start of her partnership, remarked, "I'm so glad I made that choice because we're a really good team today. It's been bumpy but amazing with Morgan."

=== 2018–2019 season: Grand Prix Final and European Champions ===
James/Ciprès's programs were both choreographed by ice dancers, with fellow French Olympian Guillaume Cizeron developing the short program and 2014 Olympic gold medalist Charlie White developing the free skate.

James/Ciprès won the gold medal at their first event of the season, the 2018 CS Autumn Classic International and obtained their first victory at a Grand Prix event, at 2018 Skate Canada International, setting a new world record in the free skate. James said they "gave so much emotion, and at the end, it was just magic for us." In mid-November, they competed at the 2018 Internationaux de France, where they won their second Grand Prix gold medal of the season, albeit with a somewhat rockier performance in the short program that left them in third place before placing first in the free skate. These results qualified them for the 2018–19 Grand Prix Final, their first appearance at the event. In fourth after the short program at the Final, they again set a world record to place first in the free skate and win the gold medal. James expressed the hope that "having this long program so solid and strong will just help when we have a good short program. I know we have to fight every time after our short program to make up the points, but feeling more free and not having to try and try to make a comeback, I think, will just liberate us a little bit more; I am hoping."

After winning another national title, their sixth, James/Ciprès went to the 2019 European Championships in Minsk. They got a first-place finish in the short program, ahead of Tarasova/Morozov. They won the free skate as well, taking the European pairs title, only the second French team to do so, and the first since Andrée Joly and Pierre Brunet in 1932. She called the result "a dream come true", while Ciprès called it "a dream when we were children to be here one day."

In March, at the 2019 World Championships in Saitama, during the short program warm-up, James had a collision with Italy's Matteo Guarise, in which both skaters fell onto the ice. James/Ciprès placed a very unexpected seventh in the short program after unusual mishaps; James had an uncharacteristic fall on her throw triple flip, while Ciprès doubled his planned triple toe loop. In the free program, they placed third and fifth overall. They finished off the top of the podium for the first time of the season but took a small bronze medal for the free program. At the end of their free program, James/Ciprès announced that they would keep skating until they won the World title. To finish off the season, they competed at the 2019 World Team Trophy in Fukuoka, Japan, where they earned a new personal best in the free skate to earn first in the pairs event and fourth overall as a team.

=== Hiatus and Ciprès scandal ===
Following the 2018–19 season, James/Ciprès were initially given two assignments on the 2019–20 Grand Prix circuit, the 2019 NHK Trophy and 2019 Internationaux de France. At the same time, it was announced that James would appear on the revival of the Canadian CBC skating competition program Battle of the Blades in the fall of 2019, partnered with retired NHL player Brian McGrattan. James/Ciprès subsequently withdrew from their Grand Prix assignments, concluding it was unfeasible to do both. James and McGrattan were the second team eliminated from the program.

On 10 December 2019, USA Today journalist Christine Brennan reported that Ciprès was under investigation for having sent a picture of his penis to a 13-year-old girl who was a student at their training center; and further, that coaches Zimmerman, Silvia Fontana, and Vinny Dispenza were accused of having known about this and attempted to cover it up in the runup to the 2018 Olympics. James/Ciprès would not compete again during the remainder of the season, and the allegations against Ciprès would subsequently factor into the scandals that forced the resignation of controversial FFSG chief Didier Gailhaguet in the spring of 2020.

On 25 September 2020, it was announced that James would be returning to Battle of the Blades for its sixth season, this time partnered with Akim Aliu. Four days later, the FFSG announced that James and Ciprès would both be retiring from competition. Ciprès was subsequently charged with a third-degree felony.

=== 2021–2022 season: Radford partnership, Beijing Olympics, and World bronze ===
In April 2021, rumours began to circulate that James was training with Canadian pairs skater Eric Radford, who was also a contestant on Battle of the Blades. It was reported on April 20 that James had been released by the FFSG. The following day, Skate Canada announced that James and Radford would compete as a pair in the upcoming season, coached by Julie Marcotte and Ian Connolly. James said that following the end of her former partnership, she "still felt I had something to give to skating, like unfinished business."

James/Radford made their competitive debut at the 2021 CS Autumn Classic International, where they won the silver medal. James struggled on her jumping elements at the event. At the 2021 CS Finlandia Trophy, they were third in the short program, but a seventh-place free skate dropped them to fifth overall. Radford called it "a disappointment because we’ve been skating better than that in practice."

James/Radford competed on the Grand Prix at the 2021 Skate Canada International, where they placed fourth. James said afterwards, "we are definitely getting stronger each time we go out there. We are trying not to have expectations but just goals. There is a lot of pressure on the outside, but we are trying to stay in our bubble." At their second Grand Prix event, the 2021 Internationaux de France, the pair skated a clean short program to clear 70 points in that segment for the first time. In the free skate, they landed all of their jumps and throws for the first time competitively with just a small two-foot landing on one throw, but aborted one of their lifts and lost their pair spin, as a result of which they dropped to fourth place. Despite this, James said it was "the most confident we have felt since we started skating together. We lost about 13 points on easy elements today that we usually never miss, but we are proud that we got the hard ones done."

James and Radford both tested positive for COVID-19 and quarantined for a period before the 2022 Canadian Championships. They opted to compete initially, placing fourth in the short program, and then withdrew, citing a need to "continue their training and preparation for the remainder of the competitive season." Despite the withdrawal, they were named to the Canadian Olympic team over national silver medalists Walsh/Michaud. This was controversial, with many arguing Walsh/Michaud had earned the spot.

Competing at the 2022 Winter Olympics, James/Radford were the Canadian entries in the pairs free skate segment of the Olympic team event. A day before competing, the two had had a collision in practice with Italy's Matteo Guarise but were still able to perform. They placed fourth in the segment, while the Canadian team finished fourth overall. In the pairs event, James doubled her attempt at a triple toe loop, and they had movement on the side-by-side spins, resulting in them placing twelfth in the segment. James fell on their throw triple flip in the free skate. They placed twelfth in that segment as well, finishing twelfth overall. She said, "the flip didn't go, but we're still a very new couple. To go out there and skate our hearts out is a huge accomplishment. And to have enjoyed it and trust our training, ourselves, and each other is huge within 11 months."

Days after the Olympics concluded, Vladimir Putin ordered an invasion of Ukraine, as a result of which the International Skating Union banned all Russian and Belarusian skaters from competing at the 2022 World Championships. As well, the Chinese Skating Association opted not to send athletes to compete in Montpellier. As those countries' athletes comprised the entirety of the top five pairs at the Olympics, this greatly impacted the field. James/Radford placed fifth in the short program, with James putting her free foot down on their throw and Radford putting a hand down on his triple toe jump. In the free skate, they delivered a strong performance, but Radford underrotated a double toe loop and unexpectedly placed second in the segment, rising to the bronze medal position overall. This was the first World medal for Canada in pairs since Duhamel/Radford's title defence six years before. Radford called the season "one of the best years of my life." Both said they were undecided about competing further.

On 11 July 2022, James and Radford announced they would retire from competitive skating. James said that "through ups and downs, joy and disappointment, I have been blessed with many people who have believed in me, encouraged me, and provided me with the skillset both on and off the ice, to make my dreams come true. I am endlessly grateful for each and every coach, mentor, teammate and staff member that has contributed to my journey and success throughout the last 23 years."

== Programs ==
=== With Radford ===
Season	Short program	Free skating	Exhibition
2021–2022	Shiny Happy People by Reuben and the Dark & AG; Daydreamers by Karl Hugo choreo. by Guillaume Cizeron & Samuel Chouinard; First Time by Josef Salvat choreo. by Guillaume Cizeron & Samuel Chouinard	Falling by Harry Styles; Maelstrom by Karl Hugo choreo. by Julie Marcotte	Répondez-moi by Gjon's Tears; Meaningless by Charlotte Cardin

=== With Ciprès ===
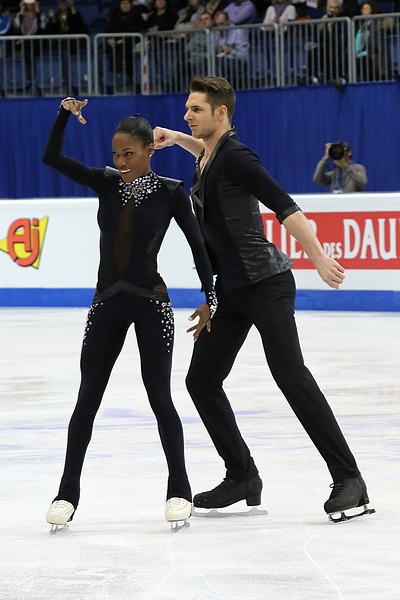
James and Ciprès at the 2016 European Championships

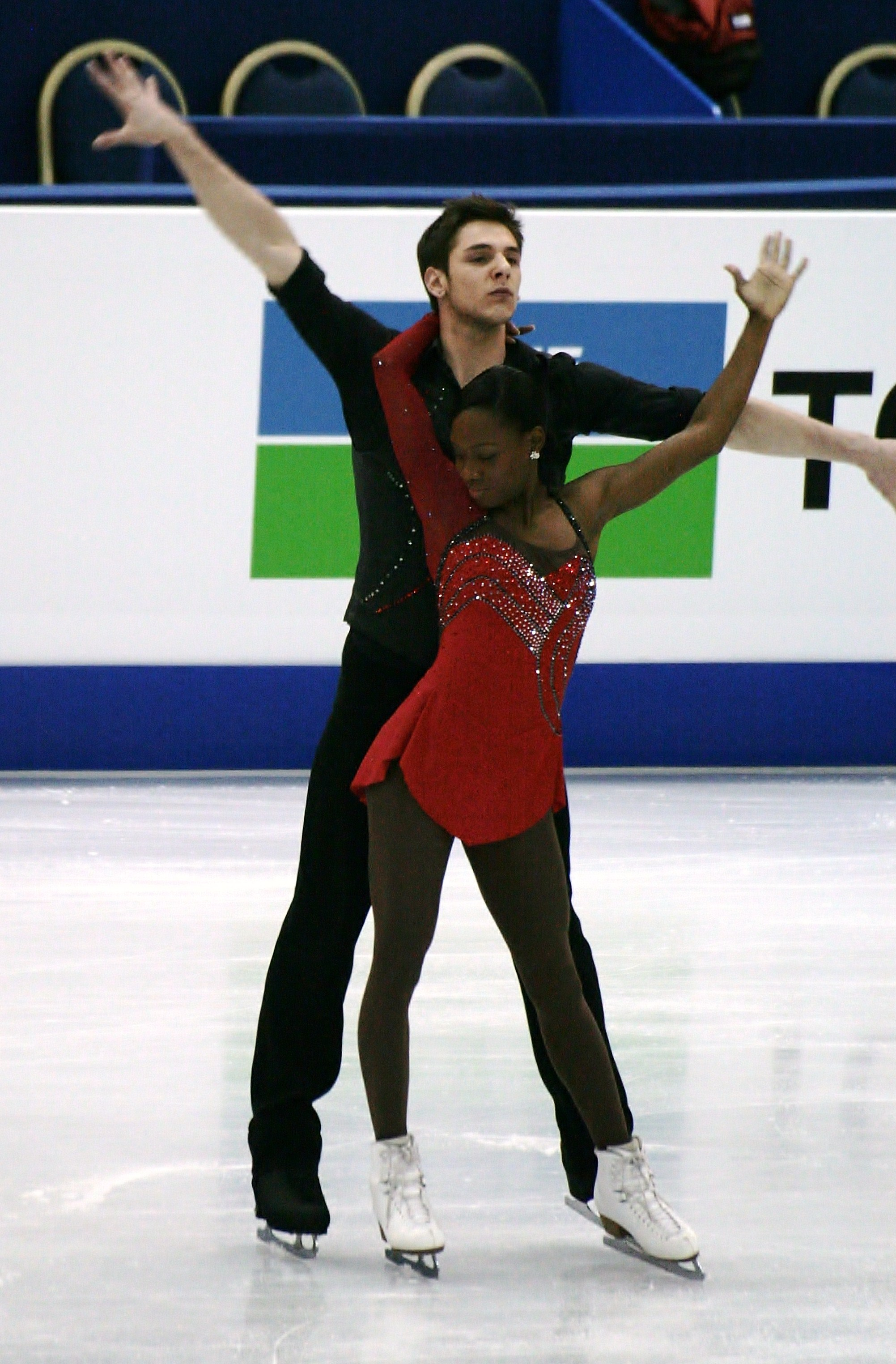
James and Ciprès compete in 2012

Season	Short program	Free skating	Exhibition
2018–2019	Uninvited by Alanis Morissette choreo. by Guillaume Cizeron	Wicked Game by Ursine Vulpine featuring Annaca choreo. by Charlie White	The Way You Make Me Feel; Black or White by Michael Jackson; Someone You Loved by Lewis Capaldi
2017–2018	Make It Rain by Ed Sheeran arranged by Maxime Rodriguez	Say Something by A Great Big World and Christina Aguilera; Sense of Freedom by Maxime Rodriguez; The Sound of Silence by Disturbed, Maxime Rodriguez choreo. by John Kerr	The Way You Make Me Feel; Black or White by Michael Jackson; Angel (piano mix) by The Weeknd, The Theorist
2016–2017	Earned It (from Fifty Shades of Grey) by The Weeknd, Maxime Rodriguez	The Sound of Silence by Disturbed, Maxime Rodriguez choreo. by John Kerr	Scared of Lonely by Beyoncé; Unsteady by X Ambassadors; Belle (from Notre-Dame de Paris) by Riccardo Cocciante
2015–2016	I Put a Spell on You performed by Joss Stone	Romeo + Juliet by Craig Armstrong; Romeo & Juliet by Abel Korzeniowski; Romeo + Juliet by Craig Armstrong	Scared of Lonely by Beyoncé
2014–2015	El Tango de Roxanne (from Moulin Rouge!) performed by Ewan McGregor, José Feliciano, Jacek Koman; La cumparsita by Gerardo Matos Rodríguez	Angels & Demons by Hans Zimmer; Heaven and Hell by Vangelis; Requiem for a Dream by Clint Mansell	Scared of Lonely by Beyoncé
2013–2014	Minnie the Moocher by Cab Calloway; Jumpin' Jack by Big Bad Voodoo Daddy	Angels & Demons by Hans Zimmer; Heaven and Hell by Vangelis; Requiem for a Dream by Clint Mansell	Hit the Road Jack by Ray Charles
2012–2013	Rhumba d'Amour; Safri Duo	Pearl Harbor by Hans Zimmer	There You'll Be (from Pearl Harbor) by Faith Hill
2011–2012	Tango de Roxanne (from Moulin Rouge!)	Nostalgia by Yanni	This Business of Love performed by Wall of Voodoo

=== With Bonheur ===
Season	Short program	Free skating	Exhibition
2009–2010	Tango by Gotan Project	Romeo and Juliet	
2008–2009	Shine on You Crazy Diamond by Pink Floyd	Romeo and Juliet	Love's Divine by Seal

=== Singles career ===
Season	Short program	Free skating
2006–2007	Malaguena by Ernesto Lecuona	Paint It Black by The Rolling Stones

== Competitive highlights ==
GP: Grand Prix; CS: Challenger Series; JGP: Junior Grand Prix

=== Pairs with Radford for Canada ===
International
Event	21–22
Olympics	12th
Worlds	3rd
GP France	4th
GP Skate Canada	4th
CS Autumn Classic	2nd
CS Finlandia Trophy	5th
CS Golden Spin	4th
National
Canadian Champ.	WD
Team events
Olympics	4th T 4th P
TBD = Assigned, WD = Withdrew

=== Pairs with Ciprès for France ===
International
Event	11–12	12–13	13–14	14–15	15–16	16–17	17–18	18–19
Olympics			10th				5th	
Worlds	16th	8th	10th	9th	10th	8th	3rd	5th
Europeans	6th	4th	5th	5th	4th	3rd	4th	1st
GP Final								1st
GP France	8th	6th	5th	5th	2nd	3rd	2nd	1st
GP NHK Trophy					6th			
GP Skate Canada				5th			3rd	1st
GP Skate America		4th	WD			4th		
CS Autumn Classic						2nd	1st	1st
CS Nebelhorn				4th	3rd			
Challenge Cup		1st						
Cup of Nice	5th							
Cup of Tyrol					2nd			
Denkova-Staviski			1st					
Nebelhorn Trophy		3rd						
Nepela Memorial	5th							
NRW Trophy		3rd						
Universiade				3rd				
National
French Champ.	2nd	1st	1st	1st	1st	1st	WD	1st
Masters	1st	1st	2nd	1st	1st		1st	1st
Team events
Olympics			6th T 7th P				10th T 6th P	
World Team; Trophy		6th T 4th P		6th T 5th P		6th T 1st P		4th T 1st P
TBD = Assigned, WD = Withdrew; T = Team result, P = Personal result. Medals awarded for team result only.

=== Pairs with Bonheur for France ===
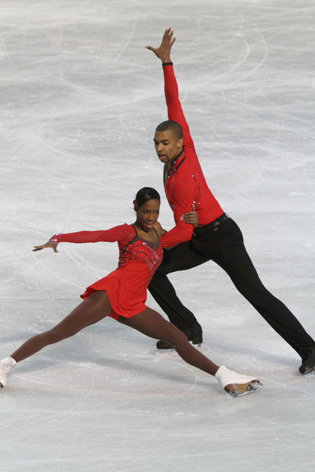
James and Bonheur at the 2010 Europeans

International
Event	08–09	09–10
Winter Olympics		14th
World Championships	12th	12th
European Championships	10th	7th
GP Cup of China		8th
GP Trophée Éric Bompard	7th	8th
Nebelhorn Trophy		6th
National
French Champ.	WD	1st
Masters	2nd	

=== Ladies' singles for Great Britain ===
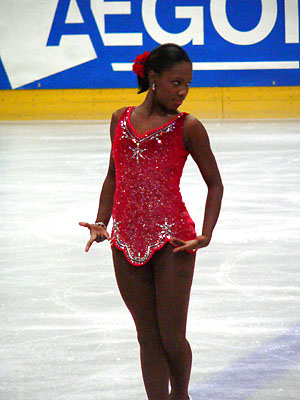
James as a single skater in 2006

International
Event	05–06	06–07	07–08
Cup of Nice			3rd
International: Junior
World Junior Champ.		27th	
JGP Netherlands		8th	
AYOF		4th	
National
British Championships	1st	2nd	

== Detailed results ==
- Small medals for the short program and free skating are only awarded at ISU Championships.
- Medals at team events are awarded for the team results only. Individual placements at team events are listed in parentheses.

=== Pair skating with Eric Radford ===
ISU personal best scores in the +5/-5 GOE System
Segment	Type	Score	Event
Total	TSS	197.32	2022 World Championships
Short program	TSS	71.84	2021 Internationaux de France
Short program	TES	38.31	2021 Internationaux de France
Short program	PCS	33.57	2021 CS Finlandia Trophy
Free skating	TSS	130.83	2021 CS Golden Spin of Zagreb
Free skating	TES	66.11	2021 CS Golden Spin of Zagreb
Free skating	PCS	69.21	2021 Internationaux de France

Results in the 2021–22 season
Date	Event	SP		FS		Total	
Date	Event	P	Score	P	Score	P	Score
Sep 16–18, 2021	(Canada) 2021 CS Autumn Classic International	2	68.29	2	115.72	2	184.01
Oct 7–10, 2021	(Finland) 2021 CS Finlandia Trophy	3	67.55	7	123.03	5	190.58
Oct 29–31, 2021	2021 Skate Canada International	5	65.02	4	122.90	4	187.92
Nov 19–21, 2021	2021 Internationaux de France	3	71.84	4	124.50	4	196.34
Dec 7–11, 2021	(Croatia) 2021 CS Golden Spin of Zagreb	9	56.74	1	130.83	4	187.57
Jan 6–12, 2022	(Canada) 2022 Canadian Championships	4	63.33	–	–	–	WD
Feb 4–7, 2022	(China) 2022 Winter Olympics (Team event)	–	–	4	130.07	4	–
Feb 18–19, 2022	(China) 2022 Winter Olympics	12	63.03	12	117.96	12	180.99
Mar 21–27, 2022	(France) 2022 World Championships	5	66.54	2	130.78	3	197.32

=== With Ciprès ===
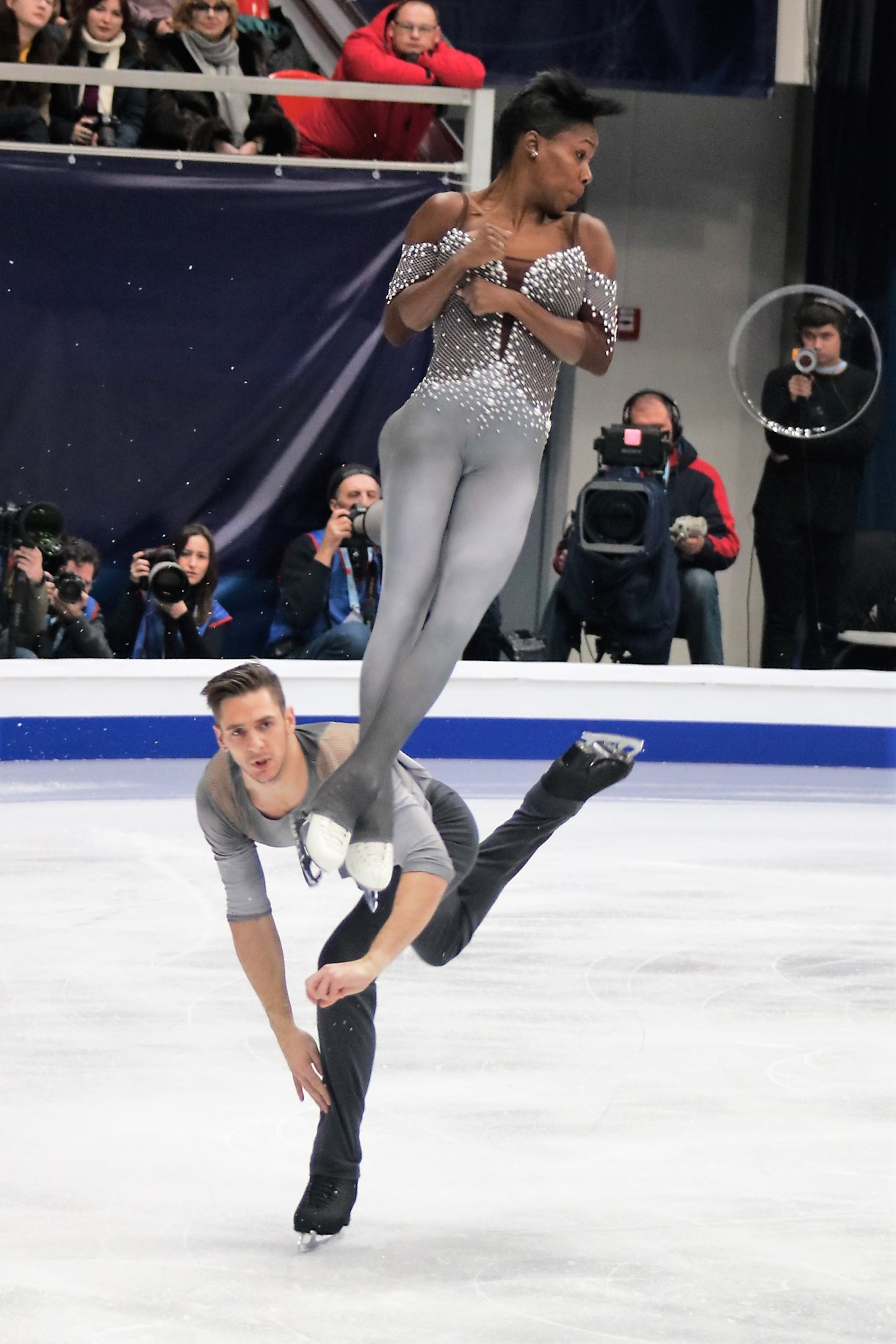
Free skate from the 2018 European Figure Skating Championships

2018–19 season
Date	Event	SP	FS	Total
11–14 April 2019	2019 World Team Trophy	2; 73.48	1; 152.52	1P/4T; 226.00
18–24 March 2019	2019 World Championships	7; 68.67	3; 146.52	5; 215.19
21–27 January 2019	2019 European Championships	1; 76.55	1; 149.11	1; 225.66
13–15 December 2018	2018 French Championships	1; 82.70	1; 158.27	1; 240.97
7–9 December 2018	2018 Grand Prix Final	4; 71.51	1; 148.37	1; 219.88
23–25 November 2018	2018 Internationaux de France	3; 65.24	1; 140.53	1; 205.77
26–28 October 2018	2018 Skate Canada International	1; 74.51	1; 147.30	1; 221.81
20–22 September 2018	2018 CS Autumn Classic International	1; 73.81	1; 136.40	1; 210.21
2017–18 season
Date	Event	SP	FS	Total
21–24 March 2018	2018 World Championships	3; 75.32	3; 143.04	3; 218.36
14–25 February 2018	2018 Winter Olympics	6; 75.34	5; 143.19	5; 218.53
9–12 February 2018	2018 Winter Olympics (team event)	6; 68.49	—	10
17–20 January 2018	2018 European Championships	1; 75.52	4; 134.65	4; 210.17
17–19 November 2017	2017 Internationaux de France	2; 73.18	1; 141.14	2; 214.32
27–29 October 2017	2017 Skate Canada International	3; 73.04	2; 141.33	3; 214.37
20–23 September 2017	2017 CS Autumn Classic International	2; 73.48	1; 137.00	1; 210.48
2016–17 season
Date	Event	SP	FS	Total
20–23 April 2017	2017 World Team Trophy	1; 75.72	1; 146.87	1P/6T; 222.59
29 March – 2 April 2017	2017 World Championships	10; 70.10	6; 134.58	8; 204.68
25–29 January 2017	2017 European Championships	2; 74.18	3; 145.84	3; 220.02
15–17 December 2016	2016 French Championships	1; 68.17	1; 130.26	1; 198.43
11–13 November 2016	2016 Trophée de France	4; 66.05	2; 132.53	3; 198.58
21–23 October 2016	2016 Skate America	4; 65.78	7; 108.87	4; 174.65
29 September – 1 October 2016	2016 CS Autumn Classic International	3; 65.58	2; 133.32	2; 198.90
2015–16 season
Date	Event	SP	FS	Total
26 March – 3 April 2016	2016 World Championships	9; 66.69	10; 119.14	10; 185.83
9–13 March 2016	2016 Cup of Tyrol	2; 60.14	2; 113.14	2; 173.28
25–31 January 2016	2016 European Championships	5; 62.10	5; 123.45	4; 185.55
17–19 December 2015	2015 French Championships	1; 68.13	1; 130.63	1; 198.76
27–29 November 2015	2016 NHK Trophy	6; 61.91	4; 118.29	6; 180.20
13–15 November 2015	2015 Trophée Éric Bompard^{C}	2; 65.75	—	2; 65.75
23–26 September 2015	2015 Nebelhorn Trophy	3; 58.34	3; 113.84	3; 172.18
2014–15 season
Date	Event	SP	FS	FS
16–19 April 2015	2015 World Team Trophy	5; 58.66	5; 109.31	5P/6T; 167.97
23–29 March 2015	2015 World Championships	12; 58.28	8; 119.06	9; 177.34
4–14 February 2015	2015 Winter Universiade	4; 57.28	3; 110.91	3; 168.19
26 January – 1 February 2015	2015 European Championships	3; 60.13	6; 107.16	5; 167.29
18–21 December 2014	2014 French Championships	1; 59.40	1; 112.12	1; 171.52
21–23 November 2014	2014 Trophée Éric Bompard	5; 54.20	5; 113.68	5; 167.88
31 October – 2 November 2014	2014 Skate Canada International	5; 56.47	5; 105.32	5; 161.79
24–27 September 2014	2014 Nebelhorn Trophy	4; 55.18	4; 108.97	4; 164.15
2013–14 season
Date	Event	SP	FS	Total
24–30 March 2014	2014 World Championships	9; 64.01	8; 119.89	10; 183.90
6–22 February 2014	2014 Winter Olympics	10; 65.36	11; 114.07	10; 179.43
11–12 February 2014	2014 Winter Olympics (Team Event)	7; 57.45	—	6
13–19 January 2013	2014 European Championships	6; 63.23	5; 122.25	5; 185.48
12–15 December 2013	2013 French Championships	1; 62.14	1; 115.04	1; 177.18
28 November – 1 December 2013	2013 Denkova-Staviski Cup	1; 56.66	1; 109.99	1; 166.65
15–17 November 2013	2013 Trophée Éric Bompard	5; 56.78	4; 115.49	5; 172.27
2012–13 season
Date	Event	SP	FS	Total
11–14 April 2013	2013 World Team Trophy	3; 58.73	4; 115.58	4P/6T; 174.31
10–17 March 2013	2013 World Championships	8; 60.98	8; 119.19	8; 180.17
21–24 February 2013	2013 Challenge Cup	1; 65.41	1; 124.41	1; 189.82
23–27 February 2013	2013 European Championships	4; 59.27	4; 119.54	4; 178.81
13–16 December 2012	2012 French Championships	1; 58.21	1; 103.80	1; 162.01
4–9 December 2012	2012 NRW Trophy	2; 60.49	3; 110.54	3; 171.03
16–18 November 2012	2012 Trophée Éric Bompard	7; 51.44	4; 112.21	6; 163.65
19–21 October 2012	2012 Skate America	4; 55.76	4; 111.90	4; 167.66
27–29 September 2012	2012 Nebelhorn Trophy	3; 55.00	4; 96.52	3; 151.52
2011–12 season
Date	Event	SP	FS	Total
26 March – 1 April 2012	2012 World Championships	13; 50.51	16; 80.19	16; 130.70
23–29 January 2012	2012 European Championships	8; 51.81	6; 100.12	6; 151.93
16–18 December 2011	2011 French Championships	1; 53.84	2; 74.99	2; 128.83
18–20 November 2011	2011 Trophée Éric Bompard	8; 44.86	7; 88.45	8; 133.31
26–30 October 2011	2011 Cup of Nice	5; 51.12	5; 92.75	5; 143.87
29 September – 2 October 2011	2011 Ondrej Nepela	5; 35.00	5; 90.93	5; 125.93

- ^C – Event cancelled due to the attacks in Paris.
