= Adeline Canac =

French pair skater

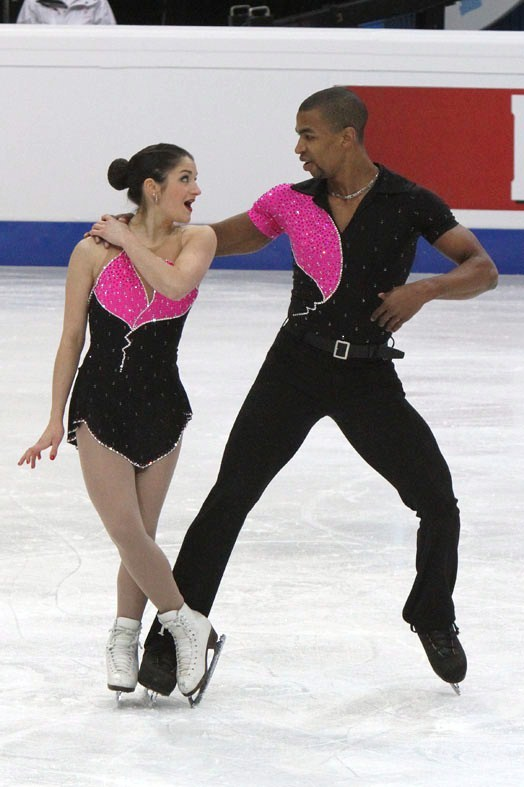
- Adeline Canac and Yannick Bonheur at the 2011 European Figure Skating Championships.

Personal information
- Full name: Adeline Canac
- Born: 20 May 1990 (age 36) Lagny-sur-Marne
- Home town: La Varenne St. Hilaire
- Height: 1.58 m (5 ft 2 in)

Figure skating career
- Country: France
- Skating club: Champigny
- Retired: 2011

Adeline Canac (born 20 May 1990 in Lagny-sur-Marne) is a French retired pair skater. She is a three-time French champion, twice with Maximin Coia and once with Yannick Bonheur.

== Career ==
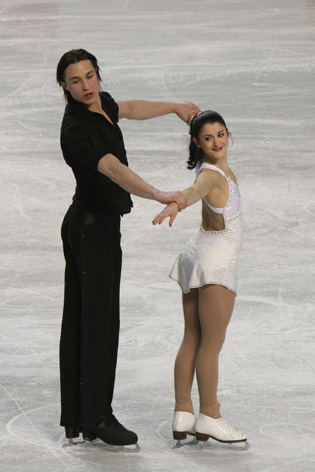
Canac and Coia in 2010

Canac competed internationally as a single skater, and her highest placement was fourth at the 2004 Triglav Trophy. She was eighth at the 2006 French Figure Skating Championships.

In 2005, Canac began practicing one hour a day with pair skater Maximin Coia and she switched to pairs completely in July 2006. They were the 2008 French national champions, but were forced to miss the European Championships after she sustained a stress fracture in her sternum. They returned in time for the 2008 Worlds, where they placed 14th.

Canac / Coia moved to Canada for training in 2008. They again won the French national championships and were the highest placed French team at the 2009 Europeans, finishing ninth. They did not compete at that season's Worlds.

In the 2009–10 Olympic season, Canac / Coia finished second at the French Championships and 10th at the 2010 Europeans, three places behind the top French pair, Vanessa James / Yannick Bonheur. As a result, Canac / Coia were not selected to represent France at the 2010 Winter Olympics and at 2010 Worlds. They ended their partnership soon after.

In spring 2010, Canac began skating with Yannick Bonheur, who by then was no longer paired with James. Canac and Bonheur's first competition together was the 2010 Master's de Patinage, which they won. They went on to win bronze at the 2010 NRW Trophy and then the national title in December 2010. They then finished 9th at their first Europeans together and 18th at Worlds. In July 2011, it was reported that Canac and Bonheur had split, and she had ended her competitive career in order to pursue academic studies.

== Programs ==
=== With Bonheur ===
Season	Short program	Free skating
2010–2011	No Hay Problema by Pink Martini	The Pink Panther

=== With Coia ===
Season	Short program	Free skating
2009–2010	Once Upon a Time in the West by Ennio Morricone	Samson and Dalilah by Camille St.-Saens
2008–2009	Once Upon a Time in the West by Ennio Morricone; Good Bye, Lenin! by Yann Tiersen	The Cotton Club by John Barry
2007–2008	Two Guitars by Paul Mauriat	Malagueña by Ernesto Lecuona
2006–2007	Tango De Los Exilados performed by Vanessa-Mae	Sabre Dance (from Gayane) by Aram Khachaturian performed by Vanessa-Mae

=== Single skating ===
Season	Short program	Free skating
2005–2006	The Cotton Club by John Barry	The Pink Panther by Henry Mancini

== Results ==
=== Pair skating with Bonheur ===
Results
International
Event	2010–2011
Worlds	18th
Europeans	9th
Ice Challenge	5th
NRW Trophy	3rd
National
French Champ.	1st
Master's	1st

=== Pair skating with Coia ===
Results
International
Event	2006–07	2007–08	2008–09	2009–10
Worlds		14th		
Europeans	13th		9th	10th
GP Bompard	7th	7th	6th	5th
GP Cup of Russia		6th		
GP Skate America			7th	
Coupe de Nice		2nd	3rd	1st
National
French Champ.	2nd	1st	1st	2nd
GP = Grand Prix

=== Single skating ===
Results
International
Event	2003–2004	2004–2005	2005–2006
JGP France		10th	
JGP Slovakia			9th
JGP Ukraine		16th	
Triglav Trophy	4th J.		
French Championships	6th J.	7th J.	8th
J. = Junior level
