= Maximin Coia =

French former competitive pair skater

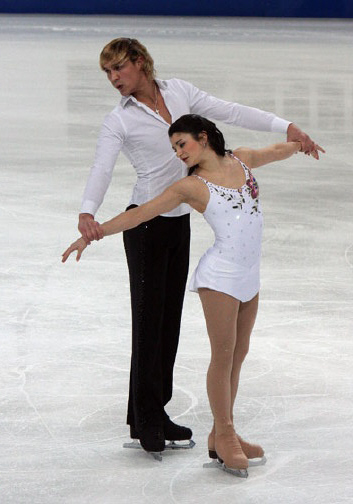
- Canac and Coia in 2009

Personal information
- Born: 5 December 1983 (age 42) Aubervilliers, France
- Home town: Vincennes
- Height: 1.87 m (6 ft 2 in)

Figure skating career
- Country: France
- Skating club: Champigny

Maximin Coia (born 5 December 1983) is a French former competitive pair skater. With Adeline Canac, he is the 2008 and 2009 French national champion.

== Career ==
Early in his pairs career, Coia competed on the junior circuit with Cyriane Felden. The pair placed 12th at the 2004 World Junior Championships.

In 2005, Coia began practicing one hour a day with singles skater Adeline Canac, who switched to pairs completely in July 2006. They were the 2008 French national champions, but were forced to miss the European Championships after she sustained a stress fracture in her sternum. They returned in time for the 2008 Worlds, where they placed 14th.

Canac / Coia moved to Canada for training in 2008. They again won the French national championships and were the highest placed French team at the 2009 Europeans, finishing ninth. They did not compete at that season's Worlds.

In the 2009–10 Olympic season, Canac / Coia finished second at the French Championships and 10th at the 2010 Europeans, three places behind the top French pair, Vanessa James / Yannick Bonheur. As a result, Canac / Coia were not selected to represent France at the 2010 Winter Olympics and at 2010 Worlds. They ended their partnership soon after.

== Programs ==
=== With Canac ===
Season	Short program	Free skating
2009–2010	Once Upon a Time in the West by Ennio Morricone	Samson and Dalilah by Camille St.-Saens
2008–2009	Once Upon a Time in the West by Ennio Morricone; Good Bye, Lenin! by Yann Tiersen	The Cotton Club by John Barry
2007–2008	Two Guitars by Paul Mauriat	Malagueña by Ernesto Lecuona
2006–2007	Tango De Los Exilados performed by Vanessa-Mae	Sabre Dance (from Gayane) by Aram Khachaturian performed by Vanessa-Mae

=== With Felden ===
Season	Short program	Free skating
2004–2005	Question for You	Somewhere in Time by John Barry
2003–2004	Liebestraum by Franz Liszt	Spanish Suite by Asturias

== Results ==
=== Pair skating with Canac ===
Results
International
Event	2006–07	2007–08	2008–09	2009–10
Worlds		14th		
Europeans	13th		9th	10th
GP Bompard	7th	7th	6th	5th
GP Cup of Russia		6th		
GP Skate America			7th	
Coupe de Nice		2nd	3rd	1st
National
French Champ.	2nd	1st	1st	2nd
GP = Grand Prix

=== Pair skating with Felden ===
Results
International
Event	2003–2004	2004–2005
Junior Worlds	12th	
JGP France		8th
JGP Poland	6th	
JGP Slovenia	5th	
JGP = Junior Grand Prix
