= Marylin Pla =

French pair skater

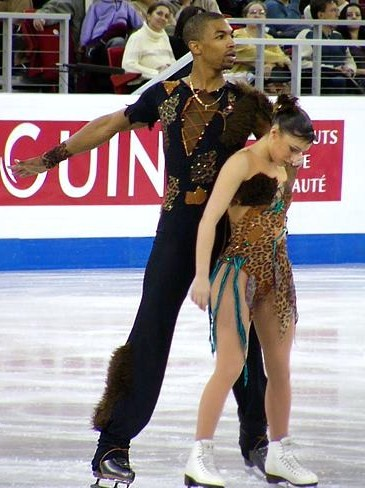
- Marylin Pla and Yannick Bonheur at the 2004 European Figure Skating Championships

Personal information
- Full name: Marylin Pla
- Born: 19 February 1984 (age 42) Athis-Mons
- Home town: Vignaux
- Height: 1.54 m (5 ft 1 in)

Figure skating career
- Country: France
- Skating club: Francais Volants de Paris

Marylin Pla (born 19 February 1984 in Athis-Mons, Essonne) is a French former pair skater. With Yannick Bonheur, she is a three-time (2005–2007) French national champion and placed 14th at the 2006 Winter Olympics.

In the 2006–2007 season, they missed the Grand Prix series as a result of Bonheur's hand injury, which occurred while practicing the triple twist and led to surgery.

== Programs ==
(with Bonheur)

Season	Short program	Free skating
2006–2007	Take Five by Dave Brubeck	Requiem for a Dream by Clint Mansell
2005–2006	Blues for Klook by Eddy Louiss	Angel and Devil by Maxime Rodriguez; L'Odysse de L'Espece by Yvan Canan; Alexander by Vangelis
2004–2005	Mille et Une Nuits	Austin Powers by George S. Clinton
2003–2004	Swing Kids by James Horner	Tarzan by Mark Mancina

== Competitive highlights ==
=== Pairs career with Bonheur ===
Results
International
Event	2002–03	2003–04	2004–05	2005–06	2006–07
Olympics				14th	
Worlds			13th	13th	14th
Europeans		8th	7th	6th	8th
GP Bompard		8th	7th	9th	
GP Cup of China			8th		
GP Skate America		10th		8th	
Karl Schäfer				4th	
International: Junior
Junior Worlds	14th				
JGP Canada	7th				
JGP China	6th				
EYOF	5th				
National
French Champ.	3rd	2nd	1st	1st	1st
GP = Grand Prix; JGP = Junior Grand Prix

=== Singles career ===
Event	2001–2002
French Championships	8th
