= Qi Jia =

Chinese ice dancer

Personal information
- Born: August 9, 1984 (age 42)
- Height: 168 cm (5 ft 6 in)

Figure skating career
- Country: China
- Partner: Sun Xu
- Coach: Ge Gao
- Skating club: Changchun Skating Club

Qi Jia (Chinese: 齐佳, born August 9, 1984, in Changchun) is a Chinese ice dancer. She competes with Sun Xu. They are the 2002 & 2003 Chinese national silver medalists and the 2001 national bronze medalists. Their highest placement at an ISU championship was 10th at the 2002 Four Continents Championships.

== Results ==
(with Sun)

Event	2000-01	2001-02	2002-03	2003-04	2004-05
Four Continents Championships		10th		11th	
Chinese Championships	3rd	2nd	2nd	4th	5th
Cup of China					11th
Winter Universiade					12th
