= Sun Xu =

Chinese ice dancer

Personal information
- Born: December 22, 1983 (age 42)
- Height: 1.78 m (5 ft 10 in)

Figure skating career
- Country: China
- Partner: Qi Jia
- Coach: Ge Gao
- Skating club: Changchun Skating Club

Sun Xu (Chinese: 孙旭, born December 22, 1983, in Changchun) is a Chinese ice dancer. He competes with Qi Jia. They are the 2002 & 2003 Chinese national silver medalists and the 2001 national bronze medalists. Their highest placement at an ISU championship was 10th at the 2002 Four Continents Championships.

== Results ==
(with Qi)

Event	2000–01	2001–02	2002–03	2003–04	2004–05
Four Continents Championships		10th		11th	
Chinese Championships	3rd	2nd	2nd	4th	5th
Cup of China					11th
Winter Universiade					12th
