= Yannick Bonheur =

French pair skater

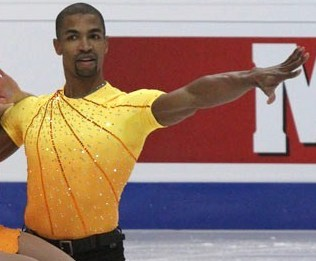
- Yannick Bonheur at the 2011 Europeans

Personal information
- Born: 18 May 1982 (age 44) Ivry-sur-Seine, France
- Home town: Chevilly-Larue
- Height: 1.83 m (6 ft 0 in)

Figure skating career
- Country: France
- Skating club: Francais Volants de Paris
- Retired: 2011

Yannick Bonheur (born 18 May 1982) is a French former competitive pair skater. He is a five-time French National Champion with three different partners: Marylin Pla, Vanessa James, and Adeline Canac.

== Career ==
=== Partnership with Marylin Pla ===
Bonheur competed with Marylin Pla from 2002 until 2007. They won the French National Championships three times and placed 14th at the 2006 Winter Olympics. In the 2006–2007 season, they missed the Grand Prix series as a result of Bonheur's hand injury, which occurred while practicing the triple twist and led to surgery.

=== Partnership with Vanessa James ===
Bonheur teamed up with Canadian/American/French skater Vanessa James in December 2007. They began competing together internationally in 2008. James / Bonheur made their Grand Prix debut at the 2008 Trophée Eric Bompard, where they placed 7th. They placed 10th at the 2009 European Figure Skating Championships and 12th at the 2009 World Figure Skating Championships. In the 2009–2010 season, they placed 6th at the 2009 Nebelhorn Trophy, 8th at the 2009 Cup of China, and 8th at the 2009 Trophée Eric Bompard. At the 2010 French Figure Skating Championships, they placed second in the short program and won the free skating to win the title overall. As a result, they were sent to both the Olympics and Worlds, where they finished 14th and 12th, respectively. James and Bonheur were the first black pair to compete at the Olympics. They ended their partnership following the 2009–2010 season.

=== Partnership with Adeline Canac ===
Bonheur teamed up with Adeline Canac in spring 2010. Canac and Bonheur's first competition together was the 2010 Master's de Patinage, which they won. They went on to win bronze at the 2010 NRW Trophy and claimed their first national title together in December 2010. They then finished 9th at their first Europeans together and 18th at Worlds. In July 2011, it was reported that Canac and Bonheur had split.

=== Post-competition career ===
In 2013, Bonheur began a partnership with Annette Dytrt to work as an adagio pair in ice shows, they did many ice shows Holiday on ice 'Time' (2017–2018), they were skating in the Lido in Paris (2013–2015).

They are also doing Roller show 'Le plus grand cabaret du Monde' (2018), they participated in many Talent show Britain Got Talent (2017), La France a un incroyable Talent, Golden Buzzer and Finale Czech Got Talent (2015), Finale Das Supertalent Germany (2016), Finale Tu si que Vale (2017), Romania Got Talent (2023)

== Programs ==
=== With Canac ===
Season	Short program	Free skating
2010–2011	No Hay Problema by Pink Martini	The Pink Panther

=== With James ===
Season	Short program	Free skating
2009–2010	Tango by Gotan Project	Romeo and Juliet
2008–2009	Shine on You Crazy Diamond by Pink Floyd	Romeo and Juliet

=== With Pla ===
Season	Short program	Free skating
2006–2007	Take Five by Dave Brubeck	Requiem for a Dream by Clint Mansell
2005–2006	Blues for Klook by Eddy Louiss	Angel and Devil by Maxime Rodriguez; L'Odysse de L'Espece by Yvan Canan; Alexander by Vangelis
2004–2005	Mille et Une Nuits	Austin Powers by George S. Clinton
2003–2004	Swing Kids by James Horner	Tarzan by Mark Mancina

=== With Stadelman ===
Season	Short program	Free skating
2001–2002	Que Je T'aime by Johnny Hallyday	Le Phantom de Louvre by Bruno Coulais

== Competitive highlights ==
=== With Adeline Canac ===
Results
International
Event	2010–2011
Worlds	18th
Europeans	9th
Ice Challenge	5th
NRW Trophy	3rd
National
French Champ.	1st
Master's	1st

=== With Vanessa James ===
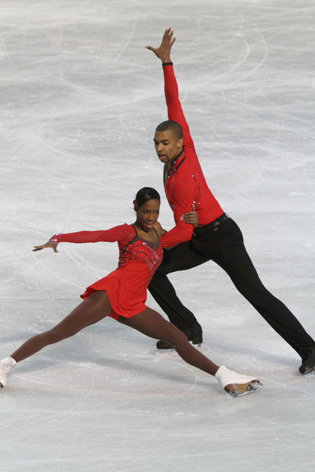
James and Bonheur at the 2010 Europeans

Results
International
Event	2008–2009	2009–2010
Olympics		14th
Worlds	12th	12th
Europeans	10th	7th
GP Bompard	7th	8th
GP Cup of China		8th
Nebelhorn		6th
National
French Champ.	WD	1st
Master's	2nd	
GP = Grand Prix; WD = Withdrew

=== With Marylin Pla ===
Results
International
Event	2002–03	2003–04	2004–05	2005–06	2006–07
Olympics				14th	
Worlds			13th	13th	14th
Europeans		8th	7th	6th	8th
GP Bompard		8th	7th	9th	
GP Cup of China			8th		
GP Skate America		10th		8th	
Karl Schäfer				4th	
International: Junior
Junior Worlds	14th				
JGP Canada	7th				
JGP China	6th				
EYOF	5th				
National
French Champ.	3rd	2nd	1st	1st	1st
GP = Grand Prix; JGP = Junior Grand Prix

=== With Lucie Stadelman ===
Results
International
Event	2001–2002
JGP Sweden	5th
National
French Championships	3rd
JGP = Junior Grand Prix
