= 2008–09 figure skating season =

- Date: July 1, 2008 – June 30, 2009
- Previous: 2007–08
- Next: 2009–10

The 2008–09 figure skating season began on July 1, 2008, and ended on June 30, 2009. During this season, elite skaters competed on the Championship level at the 2009 European, Four Continents, World Junior, and World Championships. They also competed in elite competitions such as the Grand Prix and Junior Grand Prix series.

== Season notes ==
As this was a pre-Olympic season, skaters qualified entries to the 2010 Winter Olympic Games at the 2009 World Championships.

=== Age eligibility ===
Skaters competing on the junior level were required to be at least 13 but not 19 – or 21 for male pair skaters and ice dancers – before July 1, 2008. Those who had turned 14 were eligible for the senior Grand Prix series and senior B internationals. Those who turned 15 before July 1, 2008 were also eligible for the senior World, European, and Four Continents Championships.

Date of birth	Eligibility
Born before July 1, 1995	Eligible for Junior Grand Prix
Born before July 1, 1994	Eligible for senior Grand Prix series, senior B internationals
Born before July 1, 1993	Eligible for senior Worlds, Europeans, Four Continents
Born before July 1, 1989	Not eligible for junior events (except male pair skaters and ice dancers)
Born before July 1, 1987	Male pair skaters and ice dancers not eligible for junior events
Rules may not apply to non-ISU events such as national championships

== Competitions ==
Key

ISU Champ.	Grand Prix	Other int.	National

Date	Event	Type	Level	Disc.	Location	
2008
August 28–30	JGP Courchevel	Grand Prix	Junior	M/L/D	Courchevel, France	Details
September 4–6	JGP Merano	Grand Prix	Junior	M/L/D	Merano, Italy	Details
September 11–13	JGP Mexico Cup	Grand Prix	Junior	All	Mexico City, Mexico	Details
September 18–20	JGP Czech Skate	Grand Prix	Junior	All	Ostrava, Czech Republic	Details
September 25–27	Nebelhorn Trophy	Other int.	Senior	All	Oberstdorf, Germany	Details
September 25–28	JGP Madrid Cup	Grand Prix	Junior	M/L/D	Madrid, Spain	Details
October 2–4	JGP Golden Lynx	Grand Prix	Junior	All	Gomel, Belarus	Details
October 2–4	Master's de Patinage	Other nat.	Sen.–Jun.	All	Orléans, France	Details
October 3–5	Merano Cup	Other int.	Sen.–Nov.	M/L	Merano, Italy	
October 9–11	JGP Skate Safari	Grand Prix	Junior	M/L/D	Cape Town, South Africa	Details
October 10–12	Finlandia Trophy	Other int.	Senior	M/L/D	Vantaa, Finland	Details
October 14–17	Coupe de Nice	Other int.	Sen.–Nov.	M/L/P	Nice, France	Details
October 14–17	Karl Schäfer Memorial	Other int.	Senior	M/L/D	Vienna, Austria	Details
October 15–19	Coupe de Nice	Other int.	Sen.–Nov.	M/L/P	Nice, France	Details
October 16–18	JGP John Curry Memorial	Grand Prix	Junior	All	Sheffield, England	Details
October 24–26	Skate America	Grand Prix	Senior	All	Everett, WA, U.S.A.	Details
Oct. 31 – Nov. 2	NRW Trophy	Other int.	Sen.–PN.	D	Dortmund, Germany	
Oct. 31 – Nov. 2	Skate Canada	Grand Prix	Senior	All	Ottawa, Canada	Details
November 6–8	Cup of China	Grand Prix	Senior	All	Beijing, China	Details
November 8–9	Skate Celje	Other int.	Jun.–Nov.	M/L	Celje, Slovenia	Details
November 13–15	Crystal Skate of Romania	Other int.	Senior	M/L	Galați, Romania	
November 14–16	Warsaw Cup	Other int.	Jun.–Nov.	M/L/P	Warsaw, Poland	Details
November 14–15	Trophée Eric Bompard	Grand Prix	Senior	All	Paris, France	Details
November 14–16	Golden Spin of Zagreb	Other int.	Senior	All	Zagreb, Croatia	Details
November 14–16	Pavel Roman Memorial	Other int.	Sen.–Jun.	D	Olomouc, Czech Republic	
November 21–23	Cup of Russia	Grand Prix	Senior	All	Moscow, Russia	Details
November 22–23	Ondrej Nepela Memorial	Other int.	Senior	M/L/D	Bratislava, Slovakia	
November 23–24	Japan Junior Champ.	Nats.	Junior	M/L/D	Nagoya, Japan	Details
November 28–30	NHK Trophy	Grand Prix	Senior	All	Tokyo, Japan	Details
December 4–6	Three Nationals Championships (Czech, Slovak, Polish)	Nats.	Sen.–Nov.	All	Třinec, Czech Republic	
December 4–7	NRW Trophy	Other int.	Sen.–Nov.	M/L/P	Dortmund, Germany	
December 11–13	Grand Prix Final	Grand Prix	Sen.–Jun.	All	Goyang, South Korea	Details
December 17–21	German Championships	Nats.	Sen.–Nov.	All	Oberstdorf, Germany	Details
December 19–20	French Championships	Nats.	Senior	All	Colmar, France	Details
December 24–28	Russian Championships	Nats.	Senior	All	Kazan, Russia	
December 25–27	Japan Championships	Nats.	Senior	All	Nagano, Japan	Details
2009
January 7–10	Chinese Championships	Nats.	Senior	All	Beijing, China	
January 14–18	Canadian Championships	Nats.	Sen.–Jun.	All	Saskatoon, Canada	
January 18–25	U.S. Championships	Nats.	Sen.–Nov.	All	Cleveland, U.S.	Details
January 20–24	European Championships	ISU Champ.	Senior	All	Helsinki, Finland	Details
January 28–31	Russian Junior Championships	Nats.	Junior	All	Saransk, Russia	
February 4–7	Four Continents Championships	ISU Champ.	Senior	All	Vancouver, Canada	Details
February 5–8	International Challenge Cup	Other int.	Sen.–PN.	M/L/P	The Hague, Netherlands	Details
February 6–8	Nordic Championships	Other int.	Sen.–Nov.	M/L	Malmö, Sweden	
February 16–20	Euro. Youth Olympic Festival	Other int.	Junior	M/L/D	Cieszyn, Poland	Details
February 21–24	Winter Universiade	Other int.	Senior	All	Harbin, China	Details
February 24–28	World Junior Championships	ISU Champ.	Junior	All	Sofia, Bulgaria	Details
March 24–28	World Championships	ISU Champ.	Senior	All	Los Angeles, U.S.	Details
April 2–4	Triglav Trophy	Other int.	Sen.–Nov.	M/L	Jesenice, Slovenia	Details
April 16–18	World Team Trophy	Other int.	Senior	All	Tokyo, Japan	Details
Type: ISU Champ. = ISU Championships; Other int. = International events except ISU Championships and Grand Prix; Nats. = National championships; Other nat. = Other national events Levels: Sen. = Senior; Jun. = Junior; Nov. = Novice; PN. = Pre-novice; Disciplines: M = Men's singles; L = Ladies' singles; P = Pair skating; D = Ice dance; All = All four disciplines

== Records ==
During the season, the following world records were set:

Discipline	Segment	Skater	Score	Event	Date
Ladies	Total overall	Kim Yuna	207.71	2009 World Figure Skating Championships	28.03.2009
Ladies	Short program	Kim Yuna	76.12	2009 World Figure Skating Championships	27.03.2009
Ladies	Short program	Kim Yuna	72.24	2009 Four Continents Figure Skating Championships	04.02.2009

== ISU Champions ==
During the season, the following skaters won ISU Championships.

Discipline	World Championships	European Championships	Four Continents Championships	World Junior Championship
Men	Evan Lysacek	Brian Joubert	Patrick Chan	Adam Rippon
Ladies	Kim Yuna	Laura Lepistö	Kim Yuna	Alena Leonova
Pair skating	Aliona Savchenko / Robin Szolkowy	Aliona Savchenko / Robin Szolkowy	Pang Qing / Tong Jian	Lubov Iliushechkina / Nodari Maisuradze
Ice Dance	Oksana Domnina / Maxim Shabalin	Jana Khokhlova / Sergei Novitski	Meryl Davis / Charlie White	Madison Chock / Greg Zuerlein

== Season's best scores ==
The following are all the season's best scores set over the season.

=== Men ===
Men's season's best scores on April 18, 2009.

Rank	Name	Country	Points	Event	Date
1	Patrick Chan	Canada	249.19	Four Continents Championships 2009	07.02.2009
2	Evan Lysacek	United States	242.23	World Championships 2009	26.03.2009
3	Jeremy Abbott	United States	237.72	SBS ISU Grand Prix Final 2008/2009	13.12.2008
4	Brian Joubert	France	237.09	ISU World Team Trophy	17.04.2009
5	Nobunari Oda	Japan	236.18	NHK Trophy 2008	30.11.2008
6	Tomáš Verner	Czech Republic	231.71	World Championships 2009	26.03.2009
7	Takahiko Kozuka	Japan	230.78	Trophee Bompard 2008	15.11.2008
8	Samuel Contesti	Italy	226.97	World Championships 2009	26.03.2009
9	Johnny Weir	United States	225.20	Skate America 2008	25.10.2008
10	Alban Préaubert	France	222.44	Trophee Bompard 2008	15.11.2008
11	Adam Rippon	United States	222.00	World Junior Championships 2009	26.02.2009
12	Kevin van der Perren	Belgium	219.36	European Championships 2009	22.01.2009
13	Yannick Ponsero	France	219.30	European Championships 2009	22.01.2009
14	Stephen Carriere	United States	217.25	Cup of China 2008	08.11.2008
15	Vaughn Chipeur	Canada	212.81	Four Continents Championships 2009	07.02.2009
16	Ryan Bradley	United States	212.75	HomeSense Skate Canada Int. 2008	01.11.2008
17	Denis Ten	Kazakhstan	211.43	World Championships 2009	26.03.2009
18	Jeremy Ten	Canada	207.27	Four Continents Championships 2009	07.02.2009
19	Brandon Mroz	United States	207.19	World Championships 2009	26.03.2009
20	Shawn Sawyer	Canada	206.56	HomeSense Skate Canada Int. 2008	01.11.2008
21	Andrei Lutai	Russia	204.99	World Championships 2009	26.03.2009
22	Kevin Reynolds	Canada	204.89	Skate America 2008	25.10.2008
23	Michal Březina	Czech Republic	204.88	World Junior Championships 2009	26.02.2009
24	Sergei Voronov	Russia	202.04	World Championships 2009	26.03.2009
25	Florent Amodio	France	199.58	SBS ISU Junior Grand Prix Final 2008/2009	12.12.2008
26	Takahito Mura	Japan	198.07	NHK Trophy 2008	30.11.2008
27	Armin Mahbanoozadeh	United States	193.48	SBS ISU Junior Grand Prix Final 2008/2009	12.12.2008
28	Richard Dornbush	United States	192.66	ISU JGP Skate Safari 2008	11.10.2008
29	Artem Borodulin	Russia	191.38	Cup of China 2008	08.11.2008
30	Ivan Bariev	Russia	189.12	ISU JGP Skate Safari 2008	11.10.2008
31	Keegan Messing	United States	188.21	ISU JGP J. Curry Memorial 2008	18.10.2008
32	Alexander Johnson	United States	187.81	ISU JGP J. Curry Memorial 2008	18.10.2008
33	Adrian Schultheiss	Sweden	186.43	World Championships 2009	26.03.2009
34	Kristoffer Berntsson	Sweden	186.15	European Championships 2009	22.01.2009
35	Elladj Balde	Canada	184.89	ISU JGP Skate Safari 2008	11.10.2008
36	Artem Grigoriev	Russia	184.40	World Junior Championships 2009	26.02.2009
37	Jialiang Wu	China	183.86	ISU World Team Trophy	17.04.2009
38	Javier Fernandez	Spain	183.55	World Championships 2009	26.03.2009
39	Chao Yang	China	183.47	ISU JGP Golden Lynx 2008	04.10.2008
40	Curran Oi	United States	182.89	World Junior Championships 2009	26.02.2009
41	Gongming Cheng	China	179.56	ISU JGP Golden Lynx 2008	04.10.2008
42	Chengjiang Li	China	178.94	Four Continents Championships 2009	07.02.2009
43	Jamal Othman	Switzerland	178.79	European Championships 2009	22.01.2009
44	Yasuharu Nanri	Japan	177.84	HomeSense Skate Canada Int. 2008	01.11.2008
45	Alexander Uspenski	Russia	177.81	Skate America 2008	25.10.2008
46	Peter Liebers	Germany	176.88	Trophee Bompard 2008	15.11.2008
47	Artur Gachinski	Russia	175.79	ISU JGP J. Curry Memorial 2008	18.10.2008
48	Song Nan	China	175.44	World Junior Championships 2009	26.02.2009
49	Ari-Pekka Nurmenkari	Finland	170.88	European Championships 2009	22.01.2009
50	Anton Kovalevski	Ukraine	170.61	HomeSense Skate Canada Int. 2008	01.11.2008
51	Stanislav Kovalev	Russia	170.48	ISU JGP Golden Lynx 2008	04.10.2008
52	Igor Macypura	Slovakia	169.76	European Championships 2009	22.01.2009
53	Daisuke Murakami	Japan	168.06	ISU JGP Skate Safari 2008	11.10.2008
54	Gregor Urbas	Slovenia	167.87	Trophee Bompard 2008	15.11.2008
55	Akio Sasaki	Japan	167.57	ISU JGP Czech Skate 2008	20.09.2008
56	Gao Song	China	166.93	Cup of China 2008	08.11.2008
57	Przemysław Domański	Poland	165.24	European Championships 2009	22.01.2009
58	Konstantin Menshov	Russia	165.21	ISU World Team Trophy	17.04.2009
59	Kensuke Nakaniwa	Japan	164.94	Cup of China 2008	08.11.2008
60	Ross Miner	United States	164.80	World Junior Championships 2009	26.02.2009
61	Alexander Nikolaev	Russia	163.12	ISU JGP Golden Lynx 2008	04.10.2008
62	Yukihiro Yoshida	Japan	162.51	ISU JGP Golden Lynx 2008	04.10.2008
63	Nikolai Bondar	Ukraine	161.93	World Junior Championships 2009	26.02.2009
64	Yuzuru Hanyu	Japan	161.77	World Junior Championships 2009	26.02.2009
65	Peter Reitmayer	Slovakia	160.02	ISU JGP J. Curry Memorial 2008	18.10.2008
66	Clemens Brummer	Germany	159.58	European Championships 2009	22.01.2009
67	Nikita Mikhailov	Russia	159.28	ISU JGP Merano 2008	06.09.2008
68	Christopher Boyadji	France	159.17	ISU JGP Courchevel 2008	30.08.2008
69	Tatsuki Machida	Japan	158.97	ISU JGP Madrid Cup 2008	27.09.2008
70	Andrew Gonzales	United States	158.00	ISU JGP Mexico Cup	13.09.2008
71	Xu Ming	China	157.28	Cup of China 2008	08.11.2008
72	Yoann Deslot	France	156.68	Trophee Bompard 2008	15.11.2008
73	Mark Vaillant	France	156.50	ISU JGP Madrid Cup 2008	27.09.2008
74	Eliot Halverson	United States	155.50	ISU JGP Courchevel 2008	30.08.2008
75	Ian Martinez	Canada	155.18	Skate America 2008	25.10.2008
76	Alexander Majorov	Sweden	154.06	World Junior Championships 2009	26.02.2009
77	Denis Wieczorek	Germany	153.73	World Junior Championships 2009	26.02.2009
78	Austin Kanallakan	United States	153.53	ISU JGP Golden Lynx 2008	04.10.2008
79	Chafik Besseghier	France	153.38	ISU JGP Madrid Cup 2008	27.09.2008
80	Abzal Rakimgaliev	Kazakhstan	152.67	Four Continents Championships 2009	07.02.2009
81	William Brewster	United States	151.36	ISU JGP Madrid Cup 2008	27.09.2008
82	Boris Martinec	Croatia	150.80	European Championships 2009	22.01.2009
83	Vladimir Uspenski	Russia	150.50	HomeSense Skate Canada Int. 2008	01.11.2008
84	Viktor Romanenkov	Estonia	150.06	ISU JGP Golden Lynx 2008	04.10.2008
85	Samuel Morais	Canada	149.76	ISU JGP Golden Lynx 2008	04.10.2008
86	Andrei Rogozine	Canada	149.50	ISU JGP J. Curry Memorial 2008	18.10.2008
87	Stephane Walker	Switzerland	147.70	ISU JGP Czech Skate 2008	20.09.2008
88	Morgan Cipres	France	147.30	ISU JGP J. Curry Memorial 2008	18.10.2008
89	Ronald Lam	Canada	146.05	ISU JGP Golden Lynx 2008	04.10.2008
90	Bela Papp	Finland	145.18	ISU JGP Mexico Cup	13.09.2008
91	Dmytro Ignatenko	Ukraine	144.99	ISU JGP Golden Lynx 2008	04.10.2008
92	Ruben Blommaert	Belgium	144.83	ISU JGP J. Curry Memorial 2008	18.10.2008
93	Javier Raya	Spain	144.24	ISU JGP Skate Safari 2008	11.10.2008
94	Petr Coufal	Czech Republic	143.45	World Junior Championships 2009	26.02.2009
95	Sebastian Iwasaki	Poland	141.69	ISU JGP Madrid Cup 2008	27.09.2008
96	Saverio Giacomelli	Italy	141.22	ISU JGP J. Curry Memorial 2008	18.10.2008
97	Elliot Hilton	United Kingdom	139.69	European Championships 2009	22.01.2009
98	Matthew Parr	United Kingdom	138.07	ISU JGP J. Curry Memorial 2008	18.10.2008
99	Tomi Pulkkinen	Switzerland	136.55	ISU JGP Czech Skate 2008	20.09.2008
100	Laurent Alvarez	Switzerland	136.16	ISU JGP J. Curry Memorial 2008	18.10.2008
101	Patrick Wong	Canada	136.12	ISU JGP Madrid Cup 2008	27.09.2008
102	Jean Bush	Russia	134.68	ISU JGP Courchevel 2008	30.08.2008
103	Ruben Errampalli	Italy	133.14	ISU JGP Merano 2008	06.09.2008
104	Paul Poirier	Canada	130.60	ISU JGP Courchevel 2008	30.08.2008
105	Martin Rappe	Germany	130.52	ISU JGP Golden Lynx 2008	04.10.2008
106	Kim Min-seok	South Korea	129.87	World Junior Championships 2009	26.02.2009
107	Shaquille Davis	Canada	129.58	ISU JGP J. Curry Memorial 2008	18.10.2008
108	Daniel King	United Kingdom	129.19	ISU JGP J. Curry Memorial 2008	18.10.2008
109	Franz Streubel	Germany	128.75	ISU JGP Courchevel 2008	30.08.2008
110	Paul Fentz	Germany	128.05	ISU JGP J. Curry Memorial 2008	18.10.2008
111	Romain Ponsart	France	127.38	ISU JGP Courchevel 2008	30.08.2008
112	Petr Bidař	Czech Republic	127.30	ISU JGP Courchevel 2008	30.08.2008
113	Beka Shankulashvili	Georgia	127.16	ISU JGP Czech Skate 2008	20.09.2008
114	Matthew Precious	Australia	126.71	ISU JGP Madrid Cup 2008	27.09.2008
115	Dave Ferland	Canada	125.66	ISU JGP Merano 2008	06.09.2008
116	Timothy Leemann	Switzerland	125.33	ISU JGP Mexico Cup	13.09.2008
117	Daniel O'shea	United States	125.18	ISU JGP Merano 2008	06.09.2008
118	Andrew Lum	Canada	124.32	ISU JGP Czech Skate 2008	20.09.2008
119	Mark Webster	Australia	123.08	Four Continents Championships 2009	07.02.2009
120	Yakov Godorozha	Ukraine	122.19	ISU JGP Golden Lynx 2008	04.10.2008
121	Kevin Alves	Brazil	121.97	Four Continents Championships 2009	07.02.2009
122	Daniel Dotzauer	Germany	121.62	ISU JGP Madrid Cup 2008	27.09.2008
123	Kamil Białas	Poland	121.53	ISU JGP Czech Skate 2008	20.09.2008
124	Jiří Vašíček	Czech Republic	119.94	ISU JGP Merano 2008	06.09.2008
125	Luis Hernández	Mexico	118.70	Four Continents Championships 2009	07.02.2009
126	Jakub Strobl	Slovakia	118.45	ISU JGP Golden Lynx 2008	04.10.2008
127	Robert McNamara	Australia	116.47	Four Continents Championships 2009	07.02.2009
128	Mario-Rafael Ionian	Austria	116.35	ISU JGP Czech Skate 2008	20.09.2008
129	Pierre-Luc Gagnon	Canada	116.26	ISU JGP Madrid Cup 2008	27.09.2008
130	Otto-Eemeli Laamanen	Finland	114.52	ISU JGP Madrid Cup 2008	27.09.2008
131	Dmitri Kuzmenko	Ukraine	114.38	ISU JGP Madrid Cup 2008	27.09.2008
132	Joos Kündig	Switzerland	113.69	ISU JGP Golden Lynx 2008	04.10.2008
133	Severin Kiefer	Austria	113.64	ISU JGP Golden Lynx 2008	04.10.2008
134	Patrik Timcak	Czech Republic	112.49	ISU JGP J. Curry Memorial 2008	18.10.2008
135	Anton Truve	Sweden	111.37	ISU JGP Madrid Cup 2008	27.09.2008
136	Mikhail Karaliuk	Belarus	111.00	ISU JGP Golden Lynx 2008	04.10.2008
137	Engin Ali Artan	Turkey	110.86	ISU JGP Golden Lynx 2008	04.10.2008
138	Dmitri Kagirov	Belarus	110.18	ISU JGP Courchevel 2008	30.08.2008
139	Andrew Huertas	Puerto Rico	109.24	ISU JGP Madrid Cup 2008	27.09.2008
140	Benjamin Koenderink	Netherlands	107.95	ISU JGP J. Curry Memorial 2008	18.10.2008
141	Luca Dematte	Italy	106.91	ISU JGP Merano 2008	06.09.2008
142	Justin Pietersen	South Africa	106.26	Four Continents Championships 2009	07.02.2009
143	Matthias Versluis	Finland	106.15	ISU JGP Czech Skate 2008	20.09.2008
144	Boyito Mulder	Netherlands	105.78	ISU JGP Merano 2008	06.09.2008
145	Sebastian Lofek	Poland	105.59	ISU JGP Golden Lynx 2008	04.10.2008
146	Nicholas Fernandez	Australia	105.54	Four Continents Championships 2009	07.02.2009
147	Jackson Wood	Canada	105.16	ISU JGP Courchevel 2008	30.08.2008
148	Saulius Ambrulevičius	Lithuania	105.07	ISU JGP Courchevel 2008	30.08.2008
149	Noah Scherer	Switzerland	104.87	ISU JGP Madrid Cup 2008	27.09.2008
149	Brendan Kerry	Australia	104.87	ISU JGP J. Curry Memorial 2008	18.10.2008
150	Marco Zakouřil	Czech Republic	103.90	ISU JGP Mexico Cup	13.09.2008
151	Stanislav Pertsov	Ukraine	103.18	ISU JGP Merano 2008	06.09.2008
152	Zsolt Kosz	Romania	98.82	ISU JGP J. Curry Memorial 2008	18.10.2008
153	Charles Shou-San Pao	Chinese Taipei	96.37	Four Continents Championships 2009	07.02.2009
154	Humberto Contreras	Mexico	96.10	Four Continents Championships 2009	07.02.2009
155	Wun-Chang Shih	Chinese Taipei	96.04	Four Continents Championships 2009	07.02.2009
156	Maurizio Zandron	Italy	94.52	ISU JGP Merano 2008	06.09.2008
157	Jesper Holkjaer	Denmark	92.97	ISU JGP Golden Lynx 2008	04.10.2008
158	Sebra Yen	Chinese Taipei	92.31	ISU JGP Madrid Cup 2008	27.09.2008
159	Cameron Jorey-Hughes	Australia	90.86	ISU JGP Mexico Cup	13.09.2008
160	Vlad Ionescu	Romania	90.84	ISU JGP Skate Safari 2008	11.10.2008
161	Cameron Hems	New Zealand	90.64	ISU JGP J. Curry Memorial 2008	18.10.2008
162	Aritz Maestu	Spain	90.45	ISU JGP Madrid Cup 2008	27.09.2008
163	Pavel Petrov Savinov	Bulgaria	88.59	World Junior Championships 2009	26.02.2009
164	Alexei Mialionkhin	Belarus	87.43	ISU JGP Golden Lynx 2008	04.10.2008
165	Chin Ting Lam	Hong Kong	87.03	ISU JGP Mexico Cup	13.09.2008
166	Igor Reznichenko	Ukraine	86.78	ISU JGP Czech Skate 2008	20.09.2008
167	Sarkis Hairapetyan	Armenia	84.66	ISU JGP Golden Lynx 2008	04.10.2008
168	Ivor Mikolcevic	Croatia	81.87	ISU JGP Merano 2008	06.09.2008
169	Fernando Hernandez	Mexico	81.27	ISU JGP Mexico Cup	13.09.2008
170	Oh-Reum Cha	South Korea	79.36	ISU JGP Madrid Cup 2008	27.09.2008
171	Dennies To Hon-Lam	Hong Kong	77.02	ISU JGP Madrid Cup 2008	27.09.2008
172	Jeongsol Kim	South Korea	72.95	ISU JGP Czech Skate 2008	20.09.2008
173	Pavel Strakach	Belarus	65.97	ISU JGP Czech Skate 2008	20.09.2008
174	Andrew Fernandes	India	44.35	ISU JGP Merano 2008	06.09.2008

=== Ladies ===
Ladies' season's best scores on April 18, 2009.

Rank	Name	Country	Points	Event	Date
1	Kim Yuna	South Korea	207.71	World Championships 2009	28.03.2009
2	Mao Asada	Japan	201.87	ISU World Team Trophy	18.04.2009
3	Joannie Rochette	Canada	191.29	World Championships 2009	28.03.2009
4	Miki Ando	Japan	190.38	World Championships 2009	28.03.2009
5	Caroline Zhang	United States	175.68	ISU World Team Trophy	18.04.2009
6	Yukari Nakano	Japan	172.53	Skate America 2008	26.10.2008
7	Rachael Flatt	United States	172.41	World Championships 2009	28.03.2009
8	Carolina Kostner	Italy	170.72	Cup of Russia 2008	22.11.2008
9	Laura Lepistö	Finland	170.07	World Championships 2009	28.03.2009
10	Cynthia Phaneuf	Canada	169.41	Four Continents Championships 2009	06.02.2009
11	Alena Leonova	Russia	168.91	World Championships 2009	28.03.2009
12	Fumie Suguri	Japan	167.74	Four Continents Championships 2009	06.02.2009
13	Akiko Suzuki	Japan	167.64	NHK Trophy 2008	29.11.2008
14	Sarah Meier	Switzerland	163.37	World Championships 2009	28.03.2009
15	Elene Gedevanishvili	Georgia	162.48	World Championships 2009	28.03.2009
16	Ashley Wagner	United States	161.10	NHK Trophy 2008	29.11.2008
17	Alissa Czisny	United States	159.81	Four Continents Championships 2009	06.02.2009
18	Susanna Pöykiö	Finland	156.31	European Championships 2009	24.01.2009
19	Kanako Murakami	Japan	153.84	ISU JGP J. Curry Memorial 2008	17.10.2008
20	Yukiko Fujisawa	Japan	149.28	ISU JGP J. Curry Memorial 2008	17.10.2008
21	Angela Maxwell	United States	147.46	ISU JGP J. Curry Memorial 2008	17.10.2008
22	Ivana Reitmayerova	Slovakia	147.41	World Championships 2009	28.03.2009
23	Becky Bereswill	United States	146.69	SBS ISU Junior Grand Prix Final 2008/2009	13.12.2008
24	Amélie Lacoste	Canada	146.18	Four Continents Championships 2009	06.02.2009
25	Haruka Imai	Japan	145.00	ISU JGP Golden Lynx 2008	03.10.2008
26	Alexe Gilles	United States	144.49	SBS ISU Junior Grand Prix Final 2008/2009	13.12.2008
27	Kristine Musademba	United States	143.02	ISU JGP Courchevel 2008	29.08.2008
28	Mirai Nagasu	United States	142.90	Skate America 2008	26.10.2008
29	Oksana Gozeva	Russia	142.24	ISU JGP Golden Lynx 2008	03.10.2008
30	Beatrisa Liang	United States	142.12	HomeSense Skate Canada Int. 2008	01.11.2008
31	Jelena Glebova	Estonia	140.67	Cup of Russia 2008	22.11.2008
32	Joshi Helgesson	Sweden	139.89	World Junior Championships 2009	28.02.2009
33	Katrina Hacker	United States	139.68	World Junior Championships 2009	28.02.2009
34	Yan Liu	China	139.50	Four Continents Championships 2009	06.02.2009
35	Amanda Dobbs	United States	139.44	ISU JGP Mexico Cup	13.09.2008
36	Jenna McCorkell	United Kingdom	139.37	HomeSense Skate Canada Int. 2008	01.11.2008
37	Kiira Korpi	Finland	139.01	European Championships 2009	24.01.2009
38	Ksenia Makarova	Russia	137.78	ISU JGP J. Curry Memorial 2008	17.10.2008
39	Katarina Gerboldt	Russia	137.05	European Championships 2009	24.01.2009
40	Annette Dytrt	Germany	136.98	European Championships 2009	24.01.2009
41	Alexandra Najarro	Canada	136.41	ISU JGP J. Curry Memorial 2008	17.10.2008
42	Mira Leung	Canada	136.16	Skate America 2008	26.10.2008
43	Kimmie Meissner	United States	135.92	Skate America 2008	26.10.2008
44	Sarah Hecken	Germany	135.83	World Junior Championships 2009	28.02.2009
45	Candice Didier	France	135.25	Trophee Bompard 2008	15.11.2008
46	Stefania Berton	Italy	134.90	ISU JGP Czech Skate 2008	19.09.2008
47	Júlia Sebestyén	Hungary	134.47	European Championships 2009	24.01.2009
48	Shoko Ishikawa	Japan	133.54	ISU JGP Czech Skate 2008	19.09.2008
49	Binshu Xu	China	133.26	ISU World Team Trophy	18.04.2009
50	Na-Young Kim	South Korea	131.50	World Championships 2009	28.03.2009
51	Diane Szmiett	Canada	131.46	ISU JGP Skate Safari 2008	10.10.2008
52	Tuğba Karademir	Turkey	130.85	European Championships 2009	24.01.2009
53	Anna Jurkiewicz	Poland	130.29	World Championships 2009	28.03.2009
54	Nana Takeda	Japan	128.93	HomeSense Skate Canada Int. 2008	01.11.2008
55	Melissa Bulanhagui	United States	127.25	ISU JGP Merano 2008	05.09.2008
56	Isabel Drescher	Germany	126.65	World Junior Championships 2009	28.02.2009
57	Nina Petushkova	Russia	125.61	Cup of Russia 2008	22.11.2008
58	Anastasia Gimazetdinova	Uzbekistan	125.39	Four Continents Championships 2009	06.02.2009
59	Sonia Lafuente	Spain	124.95	ISU JGP Skate Safari 2008	10.10.2008
60	Kana Muramoto	Japan	124.50	ISU JGP Golden Lynx 2008	03.10.2008
61	Miriam Ziegler	Austria	124.18	ISU JGP Skate Safari 2008	10.10.2008
62	Cheltzie Lee	Australia	123.88	Four Continents Championships 2009	06.02.2009
63	Maé Bérénice Méité	France	123.85	ISU JGP J. Curry Memorial 2008	17.10.2008
64	Sandy Hoffmann	Germany	123.52	ISU JGP Czech Skate 2008	19.09.2008
65	Marissa Secundy	United States	123.12	ISU JGP Czech Skate 2008	19.09.2008
66	Jenni Vähämaa	Finland	122.75	HomeSense Skate Canada Int. 2008	01.11.2008
67	Francesca Rio	Italy	122.70	World Junior Championships 2009	28.02.2009
68	Rumi Suizu	Japan	121.97	ISU JGP Merano 2008	05.09.2008
69	Hyeon-Jung Kim	South Korea	121.64	Four Continents Championships 2009	06.02.2009
70	Nella Simaová	Czech Republic	120.61	European Championships 2009	24.01.2009
71	Rebecka Emanuelsson	Sweden	119.89	ISU JGP Madrid Cup 2008	26.09.2008
72	Rylie Mcculloch-Casarsa	Canada	118.71	ISU JGP Madrid Cup 2008	26.09.2008
73	Viktoria Helgesson	Sweden	118.39	European Championships 2009	24.01.2009
74	Evgenia Tarasova	Russia	118.09	ISU JGP Golden Lynx 2008	03.10.2008
75	Roberta Rodeghiero	Italy	117.98	ISU JGP Madrid Cup 2008	26.09.2008
76	Na-Hee Sin	South Korea	117.57	ISU JGP Czech Skate 2008	19.09.2008
77	Kwak Min-jeong	South Korea	117.42	ISU JGP Mexico Cup	13.09.2008
78	Brittney Rizo	United States	117.29	ISU JGP Golden Lynx 2008	03.10.2008
79	Alexandra Rout	New Zealand	116.97	ISU JGP Merano 2008	05.09.2008
80	Tenile Victorsen	United States	115.93	ISU JGP J. Curry Memorial 2008	17.10.2008
81	Emily Hughes	United States	115.48	Trophee Bompard 2008	15.11.2008
82	Jasmine Alexandra Costa	Estonia	115.36	ISU JGP Madrid Cup 2008	26.09.2008
83	Svetlana Issakova	Estonia	115.14	World Junior Championships 2009	28.02.2009
84	Karina Johnson	Denmark	115.10	ISU JGP J. Curry Memorial 2008	17.10.2008
85	Zhenni Ruan	China	115.08	ISU JGP Golden Lynx 2008	03.10.2008
86	Teodora Poštič	Slovenia	114.95	European Championships 2009	24.01.2009
87	Evgenia Pochufarova	Russia	114.00	ISU JGP Courchevel 2008	29.08.2008
88	Gwendoline Didier	France	113.87	ISU World Team Trophy	18.04.2009
89	Myriane Samson	Canada	112.74	HomeSense Skate Canada Int. 2008	01.11.2008
90	Johanna Allik	Estonia	112.58	ISU JGP Golden Lynx 2008	03.10.2008
91	Chaochih Liu	Chinese Taipei	112.49	World Junior Championships 2009	28.02.2009
92	Yuka Ishikawa	Japan	112.33	ISU JGP Courchevel 2008	29.08.2008
93	Bingwa Geng	China	111.71	World Junior Championships 2009	28.02.2009
94	Irina Movchan	Ukraine	111.52	European Championships 2009	24.01.2009
95	Eleonora Vinnichenko	Ukraine	110.66	World Junior Championships 2009	28.02.2009
96	Cecylia Witkowski	Canada	109.78	ISU JGP Mexico Cup	13.09.2008
97	Satsuki Muramoto	Japan	109.59	ISU JGP Merano 2008	05.09.2008
98	Ekaterina Kozireva	Russia	109.16	ISU JGP Merano 2008	05.09.2008
99	Mckenzie Crawford	Canada	108.88	ISU JGP Czech Skate 2008	19.09.2008
100	Ana Cecilia Cantu	Mexico	108.75	Four Continents Championships 2009	06.02.2009
101	Anne Line Gjersem	Norway	108.63	ISU JGP J. Curry Memorial 2008	17.10.2008
102	Isabelle M. Olsson	Sweden	108.50	ISU JGP Golden Lynx 2008	03.10.2008
103	Ayane Nakamura	Japan	108.10	ISU JGP Mexico Cup	13.09.2008
104	Alisa Mikonsaari	Finland	108.03	ISU JGP Merano 2008	05.09.2008
105	Tina Wang	Australia	108.02	Four Continents Championships 2009	06.02.2009
106	Belinda Schönberger	Austria	107.33	ISU JGP Golden Lynx 2008	03.10.2008
107	Dinara Vasfieva	Russia	106.25	ISU JGP Courchevel 2008	29.08.2008
108	Kerstin Frank	Austria	105.73	World Championships 2009	28.03.2009
109	Ekaterina Proyda	Ukraine	105.62	ISU JGP Golden Lynx 2008	03.10.2008
110	Olga Ikonnikova	Estonia	105.13	ISU JGP Czech Skate 2008	19.09.2008
111	Mari Suzuki	Japan	104.95	ISU JGP Madrid Cup 2008	26.09.2008
112	Kathryn Kang	Canada	104.82	World Junior Championships 2009	28.02.2009
113	Karly Robertson	United Kingdom	104.44	European Championships 2009	24.01.2009
114	Julie Cagnon	France	104.23	ISU JGP Courchevel 2008	29.08.2008
115	Noemie Silberer	Switzerland	103.82	ISU JGP Merano 2008	05.09.2008
116	Manouk Gijsman	Netherlands	103.28	European Championships 2009	24.01.2009
117	Katharina Gierok	Germany	102.73	ISU JGP Golden Lynx 2008	03.10.2008
118	Dana Zhalko-Tytarenko	Canada	102.37	ISU JGP Mexico Cup	13.09.2008
119	Anna Weinberger	France	102.33	ISU JGP Courchevel 2008	29.08.2008
120	Mirna Libric	Croatia	100.62	ISU JGP Golden Lynx 2008	03.10.2008
121	Yuki Nishino	Japan	99.99	ISU JGP Courchevel 2008	29.08.2008
122	Kristina Kostková	Czech Republic	99.83	ISU JGP J. Curry Memorial 2008	17.10.2008
123	Eva Lim	Netherlands	99.32	ISU JGP Skate Safari 2008	10.10.2008
124	Yun Yea-ji	South Korea	98.90	ISU JGP Courchevel 2008	29.08.2008
125	Rika Inoda	Canada	98.62	ISU JGP Merano 2008	05.09.2008
126	Minna Parviainen	Finland	98.24	ISU JGP J. Curry Memorial 2008	17.10.2008
127	Daša Grm	Slovenia	98.04	ISU JGP Czech Skate 2008	19.09.2008
128	Anastasia Listopad	Ukraine	97.86	ISU JGP Madrid Cup 2008	26.09.2008
129	Isabel Heintges	Germany	97.62	ISU JGP Czech Skate 2008	19.09.2008
130	Vanessa Grenier	Canada	97.29	ISU JGP Merano 2008	05.09.2008
131	Karolina Sykorova	Slovakia	97.05	ISU JGP Madrid Cup 2008	26.09.2008
132	Isabelle Pieman	Belgium	96.64	European Championships 2009	24.01.2009
133	Radka Bártová	Slovakia	96.39	ISU JGP Golden Lynx 2008	03.10.2008
134	Nicole Gurny	Germany	96.38	ISU JGP Merano 2008	05.09.2008
135	Anita Madsen	Denmark	96.33	ISU JGP Czech Skate 2008	19.09.2008
136	Katsiarina Pakhamovich	Belarus	95.99	ISU JGP Merano 2008	05.09.2008
137	Angelica Olsson	Sweden	95.90	ISU JGP Czech Skate 2008	19.09.2008
138	Yueren Wang	China	95.68	Cup of China 2008	08.11.2008
139	Nanoha Sato	Japan	95.52	ISU JGP Mexico Cup	13.09.2008
140	Erle Harstad	Norway	94.42	ISU JGP Golden Lynx 2008	03.10.2008
141	Sofia Otala	Finland	94.27	ISU JGP Czech Skate 2008	19.09.2008
142	Chelsea Rose Chiappa	Hungary	94.15	ISU JGP Mexico Cup	13.09.2008
143	Sera Väistö	Finland	93.66	ISU JGP J. Curry Memorial 2008	17.10.2008
144	Katrin Kunisch	Austria	92.59	ISU JGP Czech Skate 2008	19.09.2008
145	Alessandra Laurencik	Austria	92.18	ISU JGP J. Curry Memorial 2008	17.10.2008
146	Mérovée Ephrem	Monaco	92.15	ISU JGP Skate Safari 2008	10.10.2008
147	Reyna Hamui	Mexico	92.03	ISU JGP Mexico Cup	13.09.2008
148	Tamami Ono	Hong Kong	91.89	Four Continents Championships 2009	06.02.2009
149	Sigrid Young	Chinese Taipei	91.51	ISU JGP Courchevel 2008	29.08.2008
150	Romy Bühler	Switzerland	90.84	ISU JGP J. Curry Memorial 2008	17.10.2008
151	Michele Cantu	Mexico	90.08	Four Continents Championships 2009	06.02.2009
152	Patricia Glescic	Slovenia	89.91	ISU JGP Madrid Cup 2008	26.09.2008
153	Laurie Lougsami	Belgium	89.72	ISU JGP Courchevel 2008	29.08.2008
154	Marta Olczak	Poland	89.34	ISU JGP Golden Lynx 2008	03.10.2008
155	Amelie Pierre	Belgium	88.25	ISU JGP Mexico Cup	13.09.2008
156	Georgia Glastris	Greece	88.11	ISU JGP Madrid Cup 2008	26.09.2008
157	Victoria Huebler	Austria	88.10	ISU JGP Merano 2008	05.09.2008
158	Marta Garcia	Spain	87.79	ISU JGP Madrid Cup 2008	26.09.2008
159	Matleena Laakso	Finland	87.72	ISU JGP Czech Skate 2008	19.09.2008
160	Loretta Hamui	Mexico	87.64	Four Continents Championships 2009	06.02.2009
161	Stefanie Pechlaner	Bulgaria	87.59	ISU JGP Czech Skate 2008	19.09.2008
162	Melanie Swang	Thailand	87.43	ISU JGP Mexico Cup	13.09.2008
163	Jaimee Nobbs	Australia	87.32	ISU JGP Madrid Cup 2008	26.09.2008
164	Maria Dikanovic	Croatia	87.02	ISU JGP Merano 2008	05.09.2008
165	Mimi Tanasorn Chindasook	Thailand	86.86	ISU JGP Madrid Cup 2008	26.09.2008
166	Alexandra Elizondo	Mexico	86.79	ISU JGP Skate Safari 2008	10.10.2008
167	Lejeanne Marais	South Africa	86.28	ISU JGP Skate Safari 2008	10.10.2008
168	Phoebe Di Tommaso	Australia	86.22	ISU JGP Skate Safari 2008	10.10.2008
169	Jessica Kurzawski	Australia	86.19	ISU JGP Golden Lynx 2008	03.10.2008
170	Mary Grace Baldo	Philippines	86.16	ISU JGP Skate Safari 2008	10.10.2008
171	Beatrice Rozinskaite	Lithuania	85.38	ISU JGP Czech Skate 2008	19.09.2008
172	Kaat Van Daele	Belgium	85.16	ISU JGP Golden Lynx 2008	03.10.2008
173	Katherine Hadford	Hungary	84.64	ISU JGP Merano 2008	05.09.2008
174	Alice Garlisi	Italy	84.51	ISU JGP Merano 2008	05.09.2008
175	Juna Drabyshevskaia	Belarus	83.65	ISU JGP Czech Skate 2008	19.09.2008
176	Jenna Syken	Israel	83.59	ISU JGP Madrid Cup 2008	26.09.2008
177	Katsiarina Pahartsava	Belarus	82.96	ISU JGP Golden Lynx 2008	03.10.2008
178	Cecilia Törn	Finland	82.95	ISU JGP Madrid Cup 2008	26.09.2008
179	Jessica Ga Wai	Chinese Taipei	82.65	ISU JGP Merano 2008	05.09.2008
180	Albrina Lee	Australia	82.26	ISU JGP Mexico Cup	13.09.2008
181	Aneta Michałek	Poland	82.17	ISU JGP Czech Skate 2008	19.09.2008
182	Žanna Pugača	Latvia	81.45	ISU JGP Czech Skate 2008	19.09.2008
183	Nika Ceric	Slovenia	81.33	ISU JGP Mexico Cup	13.09.2008
184	Sabina Mariuta	Romania	80.85	ISU JGP Merano 2008	05.09.2008
185	Kyl-Jade Betteridge	Australia	80.55	ISU JGP Czech Skate 2008	19.09.2008
186	Stacy Perfetti	Brazil	80.53	ISU JGP Skate Safari 2008	10.10.2008
187	Gracielle Jeanne Tan	Philippines	80.37	Four Continents Championships 2009	06.02.2009
188	Sofia Bardakov	Israel	80.27	ISU JGP J. Curry Memorial 2008	17.10.2008
189	Yoniko Eva Washington	India	79.95	ISU JGP J. Curry Memorial 2008	17.10.2008
190	Chloe Depouilly	France	79.82	ISU JGP Merano 2008	05.09.2008
191	Anastasija Uspenska	Slovenia	79.04	ISU JGP Merano 2008	05.09.2008
192	Fanni Forgo	Hungary	78.77	ISU JGP Golden Lynx 2008	03.10.2008
193	Celia Robledo	Spain	78.48	ISU JGP Madrid Cup 2008	26.09.2008
194	Alexandra Kunova	Slovakia	77.16	ISU JGP Courchevel 2008	29.08.2008
195	Crystal Kiang	Chinese Taipei	75.94	ISU JGP Madrid Cup 2008	26.09.2008
196	Priscila Alvez	Mexico	75.63	ISU JGP Mexico Cup	13.09.2008
197	Barbara Klerk	Belgium	75.24	ISU JGP Merano 2008	05.09.2008
198	Mary Ro Reyes	Mexico	74.77	ISU JGP Mexico Cup	13.09.2008
199	Yong Myong Phyo	North Korea	74.70	ISU JGP Czech Skate 2008	19.09.2008
200	Morgan Figgins	New Zealand	74.43	ISU JGP J. Curry Memorial 2008	17.10.2008
201	Devora Radeva	Bulgaria	73.64	ISU JGP J. Curry Memorial 2008	17.10.2008
202	Signe Magnussen	Denmark	73.05	ISU JGP Madrid Cup 2008	26.09.2008
203	Victoria Liakhava	Belarus	72.11	ISU JGP Golden Lynx 2008	03.10.2008
204	Sarah Paw	Singapore	71.37	ISU JGP Mexico Cup	13.09.2008
205	Clara Peters	Ireland	71.15	ISU JGP Czech Skate 2008	19.09.2008
206	Birce Atabey	Turkey	69.57	ISU JGP Golden Lynx 2008	03.10.2008
207	Sandra Matz]	Poland	69.47	ISU JGP Merano 2008	05.09.2008
208	Anja Chong	Singapore	69.28	ISU JGP J. Curry Memorial 2008	17.10.2008
209	Armine Stambultsyan	Armenia	69.03	ISU JGP Golden Lynx 2008	03.10.2008
210	Monia Aleksic	Croatia	68.29	ISU JGP Czech Skate 2008	19.09.2008
211	Siobhan McColl	South Africa	68.27	ISU JGP Skate Safari 2008	10.10.2008
212	Maria Pencheva	Bulgaria	68.15	ISU JGP Golden Lynx 2008	03.10.2008
213	Ariana Tarrado Ribes	Andorra	68.10	ISU JGP Madrid Cup 2008	26.09.2008
214	Anna Rage	Latvia	67.79	ISU JGP Golden Lynx 2008	03.10.2008
215	Lydia Fuentes	Andorra	66.32	ISU JGP J. Curry Memorial 2008	17.10.2008
216	Barbara Villarreal	Mexico	65.34	ISU JGP Czech Skate 2008	19.09.2008
217	Aida Rybalko	Lithuania	65.19	ISU JGP Courchevel 2008	29.08.2008
218	Anita Nagy	Romania	64.89	ISU JGP Courchevel 2008	29.08.2008
219	Stasia Rage	Latvia	63.63	ISU JGP Courchevel 2008	29.08.2008
220	Helga Johannsdottir	Iceland	62.67	ISU JGP J. Curry Memorial 2008	17.10.2008
221	Susana Cantu	Mexico	61.83	ISU JGP Courchevel 2008	29.08.2008
222	Hounsh Munshi	India	60.94	ISU JGP Mexico Cup	13.09.2008
223	Mila Petrovic	Serbia	60.57	ISU JGP Golden Lynx 2008	03.10.2008
224	Maria Tsakiris	Greece	59.49	ISU JGP Czech Skate 2008	19.09.2008
225	Hiu Tung To	Hong Kong	59.47	ISU JGP Madrid Cup 2008	26.09.2008
226	Anca Ionescu	Romania	52.43	ISU JGP Skate Safari 2008	10.10.2008
227	Jessica Skinner	South Africa	51.15	ISU JGP Skate Safari 2008	10.10.2008
228	Talitha Loftus	South Africa	51.09	ISU JGP Madrid Cup 2008	26.09.2008
229	Jasmina Uzunovic	Serbia	49.01	ISU JGP Courchevel 2008	29.08.2008
230	Candida Damietta Fernandes	India	35.31	ISU JGP Merano 2008	05.09.2008

=== Pairs ===
Pair skating season's best scores on April 18, 2009.

Rank	Name	Country	Points	Event	Date
1	Aliona Savchenko / Robin Szolkowy	Germany	203.48	World Championships 2009	25.03.2009
2	Qing Pang / Jian Tong	China	194.94	Four Continents Championships 2009	05.02.2009
3	Dan Zhang / Hao Zhang	China	193.82	ISU World Team Trophy	18.04.2009
4	Yuko Kavaguti / Alexander Smirnov	Russia	186.39	World Championships 2009	25.03.2009
5	Jessica Dubé / Bryce Davison	Canada	185.62	Four Continents Championships 2009	05.02.2009
6	Maria Mukhortova / Maxim Trankov	Russia	182.07	European Championships 2009	21.01.2009
7	Tatiana Volosozhar / Stanislav Morozov	Ukraine	175.83	SBS ISU Grand Prix Final 2008/2009	13.12.2008
8	Keauna McLaughlin / Rockne Brubaker	United States	172.69	Skate America 2008	25.10.2008
9	Meagan Duhamel / Craig Buntin	Canada	168.43	Four Continents Championships 2009	05.02.2009
10	Caydee Denney / Jeremy Barrett	United States	161.69	Four Continents Championships 2009	05.02.2009
11	Rena Inoue / John Baldwin	United States	161.49	NHK Trophy 2008	29.11.2008
12	Lubov Iliushechkina / Nodari Maisuradze	Russia	153.43	ISU JGP Golden Lynx 2008	04.10.2008
13	Anastasia Martiusheva / Alexei Rogonov	Russia	151.10	ISU JGP J. Curry Memorial 2008	18.10.2008
14	Ksenia Ozerova / Alexander Enbert	Russia	151.04	ISU JGP Golden Lynx 2008	04.10.2008
15	Mylène Brodeur / John Mattatall	Canada	150.05	World Championships 2009	25.03.2009
16	Sabina Imaikina / Andrei Novoselov	Russia	149.72	ISU JGP J. Curry Memorial 2008	18.10.2008
17	Tiffany Vise / Derek Trent	United States	148.52	HomeSense Skate Canada Int. 2008	01.11.2008
18	Amanda Evora / Mark Ladwig	United States	143.88	Cup of China 2008	07.11.2008
19	Huibo Dong / Yiming Wu	China	143.33	Four Continents Championships 2009	05.02.2009
20	Yue Zhang / Lei Wang	China	142.10	Cup of China 2008	07.11.2008
21	Caitlin Yankowskas / John Coughlin	United States	141.70	Skate America 2008	25.10.2008
22	Rachel Kirkland / Eric Radford	Canada	141.66	HomeSense Skate Canada Int. 2008	01.11.2008
23	Vanessa James / Yannick Bonheur	France	139.34	World Championships 2009	25.03.2009
24	Marissa Castelli / Simon Shnapir	United States	137.47	World Junior Championships 2009	25.02.2009
25	Ksenia Krasilnikova / Konstantin Bezmaternikh	Russia	137.22	SBS ISU Junior Grand Prix Final 2008/2009	12.12.2008
26	Paige Lawrence / Rudi Swiegers	Canada	137.07	World Junior Championships 2009	25.02.2009
27	Adeline Canac / Maximin Coia	France	135.64	Trophee Bompard 2008	15.11.2008
28	Nicole Della Monica / Yannick Kocon	Italy	135.33	European Championships 2009	21.01.2009
29	Ekaterina Sheremetieva / Mikhail Kuznetsov	Russia	134.80	World Junior Championships 2009	25.02.2009
30	Stacey Kemp / David King	United Kingdom	134.73	World Championships 2009	25.03.2009
31	Anaïs Morand / Antoine Dorsaz	Switzerland	131.46	World Championships 2009	25.03.2009
32	Narumi Takahashi / Mervin Tran	Japan	131.10	ISU JGP J. Curry Memorial 2008	18.10.2008
33	Erica Risseeuw / Robert Paxton	United Kingdom	129.78	European Championships 2009	21.01.2009
34	Maylin Hausch / Daniel Wende	Germany	129.67	European Championships 2009	21.01.2009
35	Monica Pisotta / Michael Stewart	Canada	129.33	Cup of Russia 2008	22.11.2008
36	Maria Sergejeva / Ilja Glebov	Estonia	127.70	NHK Trophy 2008	29.11.2008
37	Maddison Bird / Raymond Schultz	Canada	127.63	World Junior Championships 2009	25.02.2009
38	Laura Magitteri / Ondřej Hotárek	Italy	127.18	NHK Trophy 2008	29.11.2008
39	Amanda Sunyoto-Yang / Darryll Sulindro-Yang	Chinese Taipei	126.73	Four Continents Championships 2009	05.02.2009
40	Brynn Carman / Chris Knierim	United States	125.85	ISU JGP Golden Lynx 2008	04.10.2008
41	Tatiana Novik / Konstantin Medovikov	Russia	125.74	ISU JGP J. Curry Memorial 2008	18.10.2008
42	Meeran Trombley / Laureano Ibarra	United States	124.92	NHK Trophy 2008	29.11.2008
43	Molly Aaron / Daniyel Cohen	United States	122.85	ISU JGP J. Curry Memorial 2008	18.10.2008
44	Amanda Velenosi / Mark Fernandez	Canada	120.37	ISU JGP Czech Skate 2008	20.09.2008
45	Zoey Brown / Ian Beharry	Canada	120.22	ISU JGP J. Curry Memorial 2008	18.10.2008
46	Mélodie Chataigner / Medhi Bouzzine	France	120.06	Trophee Bompard 2008	15.11.2008
47	Duo Cheng / Yu Gao	China	119.73	World Junior Championships 2009	25.02.2009
48	Marika Zanforlin / Federico Degli Esposti	Italy	118.52	European Championships 2009	21.01.2009
49	Kloe Bautista / Galvani Hopson	United States	115.53	ISU JGP Czech Skate 2008	20.09.2008
50	Joanna Sulej / Mateusz Chruściński	Poland	114.96	European Championships 2009	21.01.2009
51	Camille Foucher / Bruno Massot	France	113.14	ISU JGP J. Curry Memorial 2008	18.10.2008
52	Brittany Chase / Andrew Speroff	United States	112.82	ISU JGP Mexico Cup	12.09.2008
53	Christi Anne Steele / Adam Johnson	Canada	112.36	ISU JGP Czech Skate 2008	20.09.2008
54	Krystyna Klimczak / Janusz Karweta	Poland	112.20	European Championships 2009	21.01.2009
55	Kirsten Moore-Towers / Andrew Evans	Canada	109.50	ISU JGP Mexico Cup	12.09.2008
56	Jessica Crenshaw / Chad Tsagris	Greece	108.09	European Championships 2009	21.01.2009
57	Ekaterina Kostenko / Roman Talan	Ukraine	103.97	European Championships 2009	21.01.2009
58	Marina Aganina / Dmitri Zobnin	Uzbekistan	102.52	Four Continents Championships 2009	05.02.2009
59	Carolina Gillespie / Daniel Aggiano	Italy	102.29	ISU JGP J. Curry Memorial 2008	18.10.2008
60	Gabriela Čermanová / Martin Hanulák	Slovakia	101.08	World Junior Championships 2009	25.02.2009
61	Chelsi Guillen / Danny Curzon	United States	100.74	Cup of China 2008	07.11.2008
62	Ji Hyang Ri / Won Hyok Thae	North Korea	99.88	ISU JGP Czech Skate 2008	20.09.2008
63	Sara Jones / Jeremy Sandor	Canada	99.41	ISU JGP Mexico Cup	12.09.2008
64	Alexandra Herbríková / Lukáš Ovčáček	Czech Republic	98.26	World Junior Championships 2009	25.02.2009
65	Ekaterina Sokolova / Fedor Sokolov	Israel	97.73	Cup of Russia 2008	22.11.2008
66	Marylie Jorg / Benjamin Koenderink	Netherlands	97.63	World Junior Championships 2009	25.02.2009
67	Anna Khnychenkova / Sergei Kulbach	Ukraine	94.22	ISU JGP J. Curry Memorial 2008	18.10.2008
68	Anne Laure Letscher / Rudy Halmaert	France	92.35	ISU JGP J. Curry Memorial 2008	18.10.2008
69	Rie Aoi / Wen Xiong Guo	Hong Kong	91.28	World Junior Championships 2009	25.02.2009
70	Tameron Drake / Edward Alton	United Kingdom	85.34	ISU JGP J. Curry Memorial 2008	18.10.2008
71	Malgorzata Lipinska / Bartosz Paluchowski	Poland	81.93	ISU JGP Czech Skate 2008	20.09.2008

=== Ice dance ===
Ice dance season's best scores on April 18, 2009.

Rank	Name	Country	Points	Event	Date
1	Oksana Domnina / Maxim Shabalin	Russia	206.30	World Championships 2009	27.03.2009
2	Tanith Belbin / Benjamin Agosto	United States	205.08	World Championships 2009	27.03.2009
3	Tessa Virtue / Scott Moir	Canada	200.40	World Championships 2009	27.03.2009
4	Meryl Davis / Charlie White	United States	200.36	World Championships 2009	27.03.2009
5	Jana Khokhlova / Sergei Novitski	Russia	196.91	European Championships 2009	23.01.2009
6	Nathalie Péchalat / Fabian Bourzat	France	194.36	World Championships 2009	27.03.2009
7	Isabelle Delobel / Olivier Schoenfelder	France	187.64	Skate America 2008	26.10.2008
8	Federica Faiella / Massimo Scali	Italy	186.17	European Championships 2009	23.01.2009
9	Sinead Kerr / John Kerr	United Kingdom	186.07	World Championships 2009	27.03.2009
10	Emily Samuelson / Evan Bates	United States	180.79	Four Continents Championships 2009	06.02.2009
11	Pernelle Carron / Matthieu Jost	France	178.72	World Championships 2009	27.03.2009
12	Vanessa Crone / Paul Poirier	Canada	176.82	Four Continents Championships 2009	06.02.2009
13	Anna Cappellini / Luca Lanotte	Italy	175.70	World Championships 2009	27.03.2009
14	Madison Chock / Greg Zuerlein	United States	172.55	World Junior Championships 2009	27.02.2009
15	Kaitlyn Weaver / Andrew Poje	Canada	168.76	Four Continents Championships 2009	06.02.2009
16	Ekaterina Riazanova / Jonathan Guerreiro	Russia	167.80	ISU JGP Madrid Cup 2008	28.09.2008
17	Madison Hubbell / Keiffer Hubbell	United States	167.57	ISU JGP Mexico Cup	13.09.2008
18	Alexandra Zaretski / Roman Zaretski	Israel	167.53	World Championships 2009	27.03.2009
19	Maia Shibutani / Alex Shibutani	United States	163.56	ISU JGP Madrid Cup 2008	28.09.2008
20	Anna Zadorozhniuk / Sergei Verbillo	Ukraine	160.62	European Championships 2009	23.01.2009
21	Katherine Copely / Deividas Stagniūnas	Lithuania	160.00	World Championships 2009	27.03.2009
22	Ekaterina Bobrova / Dmitri Soloviev	Russia	159.96	NHK Trophy 2008	29.11.2008
23	Kristina Gorshkova / Vitali Butikov	Russia	159.51	NHK Trophy 2008	29.11.2008
24	Piper Gilles / Zachary Donohue	United States	159.30	ISU JGP Czech Skate 2008	20.09.2008
25	Ekaterina Rubleva / Ivan Shefer	Russia	159.03	Skate America 2008	26.10.2008
26	Kristin Fraser / Igor Lukanin	Azerbaijan	158.53	Trophee Bompard 2008	15.11.2008
27	Kimberly Navarro / Brent Bommentre	United States	157.54	HomeSense Skate Canada Int. 2008	02.11.2008
28	Jane Summersett / Todd Gilles	United States	156.62	Skate America 2008	26.10.2008
29	Alisa Agafonova / Dmitri Dun	Ukraine	153.83	ISU JGP J. Curry Memorial 2008	18.10.2008
30	Kharis Ralph / Asher Hill	Canada	152.76	World Junior Championships 2009	27.02.2009
31	Karen Routhier / Eric Saucke-Lacelle	Canada	152.29	ISU JGP J. Curry Memorial 2008	18.10.2008
32	Ekaterina Pushkash / Dmitri Kiselev	Russia	151.42	ISU JGP J. Curry Memorial 2008	18.10.2008
33	Anastasia Platonova / Alexander Grachev	Russia	151.14	Cup of Russia 2008	23.11.2008
34	Rachel Tibbetts / Collin Brubaker	United States	151.10	ISU JGP J. Curry Memorial 2008	18.10.2008
35	Cathy Reed / Chris Reed	Japan	151.04	World Championships 2009	27.03.2009
36	Ksenia Monko / Kirill Khaliavin	Russia	150.86	ISU JGP Skate Safari 2008	10.10.2008
37	Terra Findlay / Benoît Richaud	France	150.14	ISU JGP Golden Lynx 2008	04.10.2008
38	Marina Antipova / Artem Kudashev	Russia	149.97	ISU JGP Czech Skate 2008	20.09.2008
39	Lucie Myslivečková / Matěj Novák	Czech Republic	149.70	ISU JGP Czech Skate 2008	20.09.2008
40	Carolina Hermann / Daniel Hermann	Germany	147.77	World Championships 2009	27.03.2009
41	Alexandra Paul / Jason Cheperdak	Canada	146.47	ISU JGP J. Curry Memorial 2008	18.10.2008
42	Anastasia Vykhodtseva / Alexei Shumski	Ukraine	146.31	ISU JGP Madrid Cup 2008	28.09.2008
43	Zoé Blanc / Pierre-Loup Bouquet	France	146.08	World Championships 2009	27.03.2009
44	Lorenza Alessandrini / Simone Vaturi	Italy	145.61	World Junior Championships 2009	27.02.2009
45	Alla Beknazarova / Vladimir Zuev	Ukraine	145.01	European Championships 2009	23.01.2009
46	Isabella Cannuscio / Ian Lorello	United States	144.88	ISU JGP Golden Lynx 2008	04.10.2008
47	Caitlin Mallory / Kristian Rand	Estonia	143.69	World Championships 2009	27.03.2009
48	Valeria Zenkova / Valerie Sinitsin	Russia	143.20	ISU JGP Mexico Cup	13.09.2008
49	Allie Hann-McCurdy / Michael Coreno	Canada	142.95	Skate America 2008	26.10.2008
49	Jennifer Wester / Daniil Barantsev	United States	142.95	Trophee Bompard 2008	15.11.2008
50	Xintong Huang / Xun Zheng	China	142.30	Four Continents Championships 2009	06.02.2009
51	Tarrah Harvey / Keith Gagnon	Canada	141.41	ISU JGP Merano 2008	06.09.2008
52	Sara Bailey / Kyle Herring	United States	141.13	ISU JGP Mexico Cup	13.09.2008
53	Xiaoyang Yu / Chen Wang	China	139.66	Cup of China 2008	08.11.2008
54	Barbora Silná / Dmitri Matsjuk	Austria	138.46	European Championships 2009	23.01.2009
55	Isabella Pajardi / Stefano Caruso	Italy	138.10	European Championships 2009	23.01.2009
55	Angelina Telegina / Viktor Adoniev	Russia	138.10	ISU JGP Madrid Cup 2008	28.09.2008
56	Kamila Hájková / David Vincour	Czech Republic	137.87	European Championships 2009	23.01.2009
57	Andrea Chong / Guillame Gfeller	Canada	136.99	HomeSense Skate Canada Int. 2008	02.11.2008
58	Elizaveta Tchetinkina / Denis Smirnov	Russia	136.70	ISU JGP Mexico Cup	13.09.2008
59	Tatiana Baturintseva / Ivan Volobuiev	Russia	135.92	ISU JGP Courchevel 2008	30.08.2008
60	Phillipa Towler-Green / Phillip Poole	United Kingdom	135.56	World Championships 2009	27.03.2009
61	Victoria Sinitsina / Ruslan Zhiganshin	Russia	135.17	ISU JGP Merano 2008	06.09.2008
62	Christina Chitwood / Mark Hanretty	United Kingdom	134.98	European Championships 2009	23.01.2009
63	Charlene Guignard / Guillaume Paulmier	France	132.99	ISU JGP Courchevel 2008	30.08.2008
64	Jiayue Wang / Chongbo Gao	China	132.53	Four Continents Championships 2009	06.02.2009
65	Olivia Nicole Martins / Alvin Chau	Canada	131.97	ISU JGP Czech Skate 2008	20.09.2008
66	Sophie Knippel / Andrew Britten	Canada	131.81	ISU JGP Merano 2008	06.09.2008
67	Catherine St. Onge / Alexander Brown	Canada	131.62	ISU JGP Madrid Cup 2008	28.09.2008
68	Joanna Budner / Jan Mościcki	Poland	128.73	European Championships 2009	23.01.2009
69	Siobhan Heekin-Canedy / Dmitri Zyzak	Ukraine	127.54	ISU JGP Mexico Cup	13.09.2008
70	Anastasia Galyeta / Semen Kaplun	Ukraine	126.81	ISU JGP Skate Safari 2008	10.10.2008
71	Ruslana Jurchenko / Alexander Liubchenko	Ukraine	126.16	ISU JGP Skate Safari 2008	10.10.2008
72	Maria Popkova / Viktor Kovalenko	Uzbekistan	126.13	ISU JGP J. Curry Memorial 2008	18.10.2008
73	Shannon Wingle / Timothy McKernan	United States	125.68	ISU JGP Czech Skate 2008	20.09.2008
74	Veronique De Beaumont-Boisvert / Sebastien Buron	Canada	125.50	ISU JGP Skate Safari 2008	10.10.2008
75	Emese Laszlo / Mate Fejes	Hungary	125.36	ISU JGP Madrid Cup 2008	28.09.2008
76	Maria Nosulia / Evgen Kholoniuk	Ukraine	124.88	ISU JGP Golden Lynx 2008	04.10.2008
77	Chloe Wolf / Rhys Ainsworth	United States	124.43	ISU JGP Courchevel 2008	30.08.2008
78	Xueting Guan / Meng Wang	China	124.32	World Junior Championships 2009	27.02.2009
79	Dora Turoczi / Balazs Major	Hungary	124.29	ISU JGP Czech Skate 2008	20.09.2008
80	Nikki Georgiadis / Graham Hockley	Greece	123.60	ISU JGP J. Curry Memorial 2008	18.10.2008
81	Xenia Chepizhko / Sergei Shevchenko	Ukraine	123.35	ISU JGP Madrid Cup 2008	28.09.2008
82	Maja Vermeulen / Andrew Doleman	Canada	123.08	ISU JGP Courchevel 2008	30.08.2008
83	Nikola Višňová / Lukáš Csolley	Slovakia	122.49	ISU JGP J. Curry Memorial 2008	18.10.2008
84	Leonie Krail / Oscar Peter	Switzerland	122.19	European Championships 2009	23.01.2009
85	Oksana Klimova / Sasha Palomäki	Finland	121.61	ISU JGP Mexico Cup	13.09.2008
86	Karolína Procházková / Michal Češka	Czech Republic	121.13	ISU JGP Czech Skate 2008	20.09.2008
87	Sonja Pauli / Tobias Eisenbauer	Austria	121.07	World Junior Championships 2009	27.02.2009
88	Genevieve Deutch / Evan Roberts	United Kingdom	120.97	World Junior Championships 2009	27.02.2009
89	Juliane Haslinger / Tom Finke	Germany	120.94	ISU JGP Skate Safari 2008	10.10.2008
90	Aela Royer / Benjamin Leze	France	119.73	ISU JGP Madrid Cup 2008	28.09.2008
91	Anne Sophie Bilet / Adrien Hamon	France	116.57	ISU JGP Courchevel 2008	30.08.2008
92	Paola Amati / Marco Fabbri	Italy	115.66	World Junior Championships 2009	27.02.2009
93	Jiameimei Guo / Fei Meng	China	115.15	Cup of China 2008	08.11.2008
94	Rowan Musson / Neil Brown	France	114.62	ISU JGP Mexico Cup	13.09.2008
95	Dominique Dieck / Michael Zenkner	Germany	114.29	World Junior Championships 2009	27.02.2009
96	Anastasia Galyeta / Alexei Shumski	Ukraine	113.04	World Junior Championships 2009	27.02.2009
97	Danielle O'Brien / Gregory Merriman	Australia	112.93	Four Continents Championships 2009	06.02.2009
98	Elena Teremtsova / Yuri Eremenko	Ukraine	112.70	ISU JGP Merano 2008	06.09.2008
99	Lora Semova / Dimitar Lichev	Bulgaria	111.89	ISU JGP Madrid Cup 2008	28.09.2008
100	Lesia Valadzenkava / Vitali Vakunov	Belarus	111.59	ISU JGP Golden Lynx 2008	04.10.2008
101	Ksenia Shmirina / Yahor Maistrov	Belarus	110.85	European Championships 2009	23.01.2009
102	Gabriela Kubová / Petr Seknička	Czech Republic	110.56	ISU JGP Czech Skate 2008	20.09.2008
103	Justyna Plutowska / Dawid Pietrzyński	Poland	110.35	ISU JGP Madrid Cup 2008	28.09.2008
104	Abby Carswell / Jason Cusmariu	Canada	110.22	ISU JGP Mexico Cup	13.09.2008
105	Harmonie Lafont / Stanislas Etzol	France	108.13	ISU JGP Merano 2008	06.09.2008
106	Sarah Robert-Sifaoui / Nicolas Berger	France	106.96	ISU JGP Czech Skate 2008	20.09.2008
107	Alissandra Aronow / Aleksandr Pirogov	Lithuania	106.11	ISU JGP Madrid Cup 2008	28.09.2008
108	Kristina Kiudmaa / Aleksei Trohlev	Estonia	105.83	ISU JGP Merano 2008	06.09.2008
109	Sarah Coward / Michael Coward	United Kingdom	105.74	ISU JGP J. Curry Memorial 2008	18.10.2008
110	Sara Hurtado / Adria Diaz	Spain	104.91	ISU JGP Skate Safari 2008	10.10.2008
111	Federica Testa / Andrea Malnati	Italy	103.69	ISU JGP Madrid Cup 2008	28.09.2008
112	Viktoria Kavaleva / Yirii Bieliaiev	Belarus	102.82	ISU JGP Golden Lynx 2008	04.10.2008
113	Maria Borounov / Evgeni Borounov	Australia	101.35	Four Continents Championships 2009	06.02.2009
114	Ariana Weintraub / Avidan Brown	Israel	100.76	ISU JGP J. Curry Memorial 2008	18.10.2008
115	Stephanie Friedreich / Heinrich Lang	Austria	93.61	ISU JGP Czech Skate 2008	20.09.2008
116	Jekaterina Sergejeva / Andrejs Sitiks	Latvia	93.40	ISU JGP J. Curry Memorial 2008	18.10.2008
117	Martina Montonati / Francesco Fioretti	Italy	90.93	ISU JGP Merano 2008	06.09.2008
118	Hanna Asadchaya / Dmitri Lamtyugin	Belarus	90.49	ISU JGP Golden Lynx 2008	04.10.2008
119	Emili Arm / Rodion Bogdanov	Estonia	72.70	ISU JGP Madrid Cup 2008	28.09.2008

== World standings ==
=== Season-end standings (top 30) ===
==== Men's singles ====
As of 27 March 2009

Rank	Nation	Skater	Points	Season	ISU Championships or Olympics	(Junior) Grand Prix and Final		Selected International Competition	
Rank	Nation	Skater	Points	Season	Best	Best	2nd Best	Best	2nd Best
1	CZE	Tomáš Verner	4092	2008/2009 season (100%)	875	583	360	203	182
1	CZE	Tomáš Verner	4092	2007/2008 season (100%)	840	360	236	250	203
1	CZE	Tomáš Verner	4092	2006/2007 season (70%)	613	204	183	175	158
2	FRA	Brian Joubert	3704	2008/2009 season (100%)	972	400	292	0	0
2	FRA	Brian Joubert	3704	2007/2008 season (100%)	1080	400	0	0	0
2	FRA	Brian Joubert	3704	2006/2007 season (70%)	840	560	280	0	0
3	BEL	Kevin van der Perren	3589	2008/2009 season (100%)	680	236	0	250	225
3	BEL	Kevin van der Perren	3589	2007/2008 season (100%)	709	472	360	250	203
3	BEL	Kevin van der Perren	3589	2006/2007 season (70%)	476	204	165	0	0
4	USA	Evan Lysacek	3536	2008/2009 season (100%)	1200	324	324	0	0
4	USA	Evan Lysacek	3536	2007/2008 season (100%)	680	648	360	0	0
4	USA	Evan Lysacek	3536	2006/2007 season (70%)	588	280	252	0	0
5	JPN	Daisuke Takahashi	3535	2008/2009 season (100%)	0	0	0	0	0
5	JPN	Daisuke Takahashi	3535	2007/2008 season (100%)	875	720	400	0	0
5	JPN	Daisuke Takahashi	3535	2006/2007 season (70%)	756	504	280	0	0
6	CAN	Patrick Chan	3447	2008/2009 season (100%)	1080	525	400	0	0
6	CAN	Patrick Chan	3447	2007/2008 season (100%)	517	525	400	0	0
6	CAN	Patrick Chan	3447	2006/2007 season (70%)	451	183	149	0	0
7	USA	Johnny Weir	3365	2008/2009 season (100%)	0	648	360	0	0
7	USA	Johnny Weir	3365	2007/2008 season (100%)	972	583	400	0	0
7	USA	Johnny Weir	3365	2006/2007 season (70%)	402	252	227	0	0
8	USA	Jeremy Abbott	2960	2008/2009 season (100%)	551	800	400	0	0
8	USA	Jeremy Abbott	2960	2007/2008 season (100%)	551	292	191	0	0
8	USA	Jeremy Abbott	2960	2006/2007 season (70%)	476	0	0	175	0
9	SUI	Stéphane Lambiel	2907	2008/2009 season (100%)	0	0	0	0	0
9	SUI	Stéphane Lambiel	2907	2007/2008 season (100%)	787	800	360	0	0
9	SUI	Stéphane Lambiel	2907	2006/2007 season (70%)	680	280	0	0	0
10	JPN	Takahiko Kozuka	2892	2008/2009 season (100%)	709	720	400	0	0
10	JPN	Takahiko Kozuka	2892	2007/2008 season (100%)	574	262	191	0	0
10	JPN	Takahiko Kozuka	2892	2006/2007 season (70%)	0	227	165	0	0
11	USA	Adam Rippon	2733	2008/2009 season (100%)	715	262	191	0	0
11	USA	Adam Rippon	2733	2007/2008 season (100%)	715	600	250	0	0
11	USA	Adam Rippon	2733	2006/2007 season (70%)	0	0	0	0	0
12	JPN	Nobunari Oda	2719	2008/2009 season (100%)	638	400	0	250	250
12	JPN	Nobunari Oda	2719	2007/2008 season (100%)	0	0	0	0	0
12	JPN	Nobunari Oda	2719	2006/2007 season (70%)	447	454	280	0	0
13	FRA	Yannick Ponsero	2667	2008/2009 season (100%)	612	324	292	250	203
13	FRA	Yannick Ponsero	2667	2007/2008 season (100%)	264	236	236	250	0
13	FRA	Yannick Ponsero	2667	2006/2007 season (70%)	214	165	149	0	0
14	CZE	Michal Brezina	2561	2008/2009 season (100%)	644	250	250	225	0
14	CZE	Michal Brezina	2561	2007/2008 season (100%)	469	225	133	250	0
14	CZE	Michal Brezina	2561	2006/2007 season (70%)	103	115	0	115	0
15	USA	Stephen Carriere	2509	2008/2009 season (100%)	0	360	236	0	0
15	USA	Stephen Carriere	2509	2007/2008 season (100%)	612	324	292	0	0
15	USA	Stephen Carriere	2509	2006/2007 season (70%)	501	420	175	0	0
16	FRA	Alban Préaubert	2503	2008/2009 season (100%)	551	324	324	225	0
16	FRA	Alban Préaubert	2503	2007/2008 season (100%)	325	324	262	0	0
16	FRA	Alban Préaubert	2503	2006/2007 season (70%)	347	408	252	0	0
17	USA	Brandon Mroz	2468	2008/2009 season (100%)	517	262	213	0	0
17	USA	Brandon Mroz	2468	2007/2008 season (100%)	521	540	250	0	0
17	USA	Brandon Mroz	2468	2006/2007 season (70%)	365	378	175	0	0
18	CAN	Jeffrey Buttle	2345	2008/2009 season (100%)	0	0	0	0	0
18	CAN	Jeffrey Buttle	2345	2007/2008 season (100%)	1200	324	292	0	0
18	CAN	Jeffrey Buttle	2345	2006/2007 season (70%)	529	0	0	0	0
19	RUS	Sergei Voronov	2204	2008/2009 season (100%)	362	236	213	203	0
19	RUS	Sergei Voronov	2204	2007/2008 season (100%)	638	360	0	0	0
19	RUS	Sergei Voronov	2204	2006/2007 season (70%)	405	149	0	0	0
20	RUS	Artem Borodulin	1878	2008/2009 season (100%)	237	292	0	0	0
20	RUS	Artem Borodulin	1878	2007/2008 season (100%)	644	250	203	0	0
20	RUS	Artem Borodulin	1878	2006/2007 season (70%)	266	223	158	0	0
21	CAN	Kevin Reynolds	1865	2008/2009 season (100%)	308	292	292	0	0
21	CAN	Kevin Reynolds	1865	2007/2008 season (100%)	422	191	0	0	0
21	CAN	Kevin Reynolds	1865	2006/2007 season (70%)	328	340	175	0	0
22	SWE	Kristoffer Berntsson	1787	2008/2009 season (100%)	402	191	191	0	0
22	SWE	Kristoffer Berntsson	1787	2007/2008 season (100%)	446	0	0	250	0
22	SWE	Kristoffer Berntsson	1787	2006/2007 season (70%)	362	165	0	142	0
23	BLR	Sergei Davydov	1768	2008/2009 season (100%)	0	0	0	0	0
23	BLR	Sergei Davydov	1768	2007/2008 season (100%)	377	292	236	0	0
23	BLR	Sergei Davydov	1768	2006/2007 season (70%)	428	252	183	0	0
24	CAN	Vaughn Chipeur	1757	2008/2009 season (100%)	496	262	0	0	0
24	CAN	Vaughn Chipeur	1757	2007/2008 season (100%)	446	262	0	0	0
24	CAN	Vaughn Chipeur	1757	2006/2007 season (70%)	0	149	0	142	0
25	JPN	Takahito Mura	1738	2008/2009 season (100%)	275	262	0	250	0
25	JPN	Takahito Mura	1738	2007/2008 season (100%)	107	203	203	0	0
25	JPN	Takahito Mura	1738	2006/2007 season (70%)	239	306	158	0	0
26	SWE	Adrian Schultheiss	1677	2008/2009 season (100%)	200	213	213	0	0
26	SWE	Adrian Schultheiss	1677	2007/2008 season (100%)	496	182	148	225	0
26	SWE	Adrian Schultheiss	1677	2006/2007 season (70%)	127	115	104	0	0
27	CHN	Jinlin Guan	1676	2008/2009 season (100%)	0	0	0	0	0
27	CHN	Jinlin Guan	1676	2007/2008 season (100%)	579	394	250	0	0
27	CHN	Jinlin Guan	1676	2006/2007 season (70%)	295	158	0	0	0
28	KAZ	Denis Ten	1610	2008/2009 season (100%)	574	394	250	0	0
28	KAZ	Denis Ten	1610	2007/2008 season (100%)	147	148	97	0	0
28	KAZ	Denis Ten	1610	2006/2007 season (70%)	0	68	0	0	0
29	FRA	Florent Amodio	1588	2008/2009 season (100%)	164	600	250	0	0
29	FRA	Florent Amodio	1588	2007/2008 season (100%)	277	164	133	0	0
29	FRA	Florent Amodio	1588	2006/2007 season (70%)	115	127	0	0	0
30	RUS	Ivan Bariev	1586	2008/2009 season (100%)	0	437	225	0	0
30	RUS	Ivan Bariev	1586	2007/2008 season (100%)	380	319	225	0	0
30	RUS	Ivan Bariev	1586	2006/2007 season (70%)	0	0	0	0	0

==== Ladies' singles ====
As of 29 March 2009

Rank	Nation	Skater	Points	Season	ISU Championships or Olympics	(Junior) Grand Prix and Final		Selected International Competition	
Rank	Nation	Skater	Points	Season	Best	Best	2nd Best	Best	2nd Best
1	KOR	Yuna Kim	4652	2008/2009 season (100%)	1200	720	400	0	0
1	KOR	Yuna Kim	4652	2007/2008 season (100%)	972	800	400	0	0
1	KOR	Yuna Kim	4652	2006/2007 season (70%)	680	560	280	0	0
2	ITA	Carolina Kostner	4635	2008/2009 season (100%)	756	648	400	250	0
2	ITA	Carolina Kostner	4635	2007/2008 season (100%)	1080	648	400	250	203
2	ITA	Carolina Kostner	4635	2006/2007 season (70%)	588	0	0	0	0
3	JPN	Mao Asada	4499	2008/2009 season (100%)	875	800	400	0	0
3	JPN	Mao Asada	4499	2007/2008 season (100%)	1200	720	400	0	0
3	JPN	Mao Asada	4499	2006/2007 season (70%)	756	504	280	0	0
4	CAN	Joannie Rochette	3498	2008/2009 season (100%)	1080	583	400	0	0
4	CAN	Joannie Rochette	3498	2007/2008 season (100%)	787	324	324	0	0
4	CAN	Joannie Rochette	3498	2006/2007 season (70%)	476	280	204	0	0
5	FIN	Laura Lepistö	3416	2008/2009 season (100%)	840	324	262	225	225
5	FIN	Laura Lepistö	3416	2007/2008 season (100%)	680	262	213	203	182
5	FIN	Laura Lepistö	3416	2006/2007 season (70%)	266	115	0	0	0
6	JPN	Miki Ando	3372	2008/2009 season (100%)	972	472	360	0	0
6	JPN	Miki Ando	3372	2007/2008 season (100%)	680	360	292	0	0
6	JPN	Miki Ando	3372	2006/2007 season (70%)	840	368	280	0	0
7	JPN	Yukari Nakano	3196	2008/2009 season (100%)	0	525	360	0	0
7	JPN	Yukari Nakano	3196	2007/2008 season (100%)	875	525	360	0	0
7	JPN	Yukari Nakano	3196	2006/2007 season (70%)	551	252	227	0	0
8	USA	Caroline Zhang	2975	2008/2009 season (100%)	644	324	262	0	0
8	USA	Caroline Zhang	2975	2007/2008 season (100%)	644	583	360	0	0
8	USA	Caroline Zhang	2975	2006/2007 season (70%)	501	420	175	0	0
9	USA	Rachael Flatt	2944	2008/2009 season (100%)	787	360	292	0	0
9	USA	Rachael Flatt	2944	2007/2008 season (100%)	715	540	250	0	0
9	USA	Rachael Flatt	2944	2006/2007 season (70%)	0	0	0	0	0
10	HUN	Júlia Sebestyén	2905	2008/2009 season (100%)	402	213	0	250	0
10	HUN	Júlia Sebestyén	2905	2007/2008 season (100%)	612	262	213	250	164
10	HUN	Júlia Sebestyén	2905	2006/2007 season (70%)	264	330	280	142	0
11	SUI	Sarah Meier	2874	2008/2009 season (100%)	517	236	0	203	0
11	SUI	Sarah Meier	2874	2007/2008 season (100%)	756	360	292	0	0
11	SUI	Sarah Meier	2874	2006/2007 season (70%)	529	454	280	0	0
12	USA	Kimmie Meissner	2602	2008/2009 season (100%)	0	191	191	0	0
12	USA	Kimmie Meissner	2602	2007/2008 season (100%)	638	472	400	0	0
12	USA	Kimmie Meissner	2602	2006/2007 season (70%)	613	252	227	0	0
13	FIN	Susanna Pöykiö	2527	2008/2009 season (100%)	680	262	236	164	0
13	FIN	Susanna Pöykiö	2527	2007/2008 season (100%)	0	191	0	225	0
13	FIN	Susanna Pöykiö	2527	2006/2007 season (70%)	428	183	183	158	0
14	USA	Mirai Nagasu	2333	2008/2009 season (100%)	0	262	191	0	0
14	USA	Mirai Nagasu	2333	2007/2008 season (100%)	579	600	250	0	0
14	USA	Mirai Nagasu	2333	2006/2007 season (70%)	451	0	0	0	0
15	JPN	Fumie Suguri	2283	2008/2009 season (100%)	574	360	324	0	0
15	JPN	Fumie Suguri	2283	2007/2008 season (100%)	325	292	262	0	0
15	JPN	Fumie Suguri	2283	2006/2007 season (70%)	0	408	252	0	0
16	FIN	Kiira Korpi	2272	2008/2009 season (100%)	551	0	0	0	0
16	FIN	Kiira Korpi	2272	2007/2008 season (100%)	551	292	0	225	164
16	FIN	Kiira Korpi	2272	2006/2007 season (70%)	476	165	149	175	0
17	USA	Ashley Wagner	2270	2008/2009 season (100%)	579	292	292	0	0
17	USA	Ashley Wagner	2270	2007/2008 season (100%)	402	324	262	0	0
17	USA	Ashley Wagner	2270	2006/2007 season (70%)	405	378	175	0	0
18	RUS	Alena Leonova	2226	2008/2009 season (100%)	715	262	213	225	0
18	RUS	Alena Leonova	2226	2007/2008 season (100%)	422	225	164	0	0
18	RUS	Alena Leonova	2226	2006/2007 season (70%)	157	0	0	0	0
19	GEO	Elene Gedevanishvili	2158	2008/2009 season (100%)	465	213	0	250	182
19	GEO	Elene Gedevanishvili	2158	2007/2008 season (100%)	446	236	191	0	0
19	GEO	Elene Gedevanishvili	2158	2006/2007 season (70%)	281	0	0	175	0
20	USA	Alissa Czisny	2110	2008/2009 season (100%)	418	324	292	250	0
20	USA	Alissa Czisny	2110	2007/2008 season (100%)	0	236	0	0	0
20	USA	Alissa Czisny	2110	2006/2007 season (70%)	386	204	0	0	0
21	FIN	Jenni Vähämaa	1938	2008/2009 season (100%)	0	0	0	0	0
21	FIN	Jenni Vähämaa	1938	2007/2008 season (100%)	521	394	225	250	0
21	FIN	Jenni Vähämaa	1938	2006/2007 season (70%)	365	115	68	0	0
22	EST	Elena Glebova	1897	2008/2009 season (100%)	264	236	0	225	182
22	EST	Elena Glebova	1897	2007/2008 season (100%)	275	236	191	0	0
22	EST	Elena Glebova	1897	2006/2007 season (70%)	295	142	104	115	0
23	SWE	Joshi Helgesson	1873	2008/2009 season (100%)	521	133	108	225	225
23	SWE	Joshi Helgesson	1873	2007/2008 season (100%)	380	148	133	0	0
23	SWE	Joshi Helgesson	1873	2006/2007 season (70%)	0	76	0	0	0
24	SVK	Ivana Reitmayerova	1723	2008/2009 season (100%)	342	148	108	250	225
24	SVK	Ivana Reitmayerova	1723	2007/2008 season (100%)	164	97	0	225	164
24	SVK	Ivana Reitmayerova	1723	2006/2007 season (70%)	0	0	0	0	0
25	JPN	Akiko Suzuki	1715	2008/2009 season (100%)	402	360	0	250	203
25	JPN	Akiko Suzuki	1715	2007/2008 season (100%)	0	0	0	250	250
25	JPN	Akiko Suzuki	1715	2006/2007 season (70%)	0	0	0	0	0
26	ITA	Stefania Berton	1675	2008/2009 season (100%)	173	203	182	250	203
26	ITA	Stefania Berton	1675	2007/2008 season (100%)	237	148	133	0	0
26	ITA	Stefania Berton	1675	2006/2007 season (70%)	194	248	158	0	0
27	ITA	Valentina Marchei	1674	2008/2009 season (100%)	0	0	0	250	0
27	ITA	Valentina Marchei	1674	2007/2008 season (100%)	496	0	0	250	0
27	ITA	Valentina Marchei	1674	2006/2007 season (70%)	386	165	0	127	0
28	USA	Beatrisa Liang	1578	2008/2009 season (100%)	0	262	236	0	0
28	USA	Beatrisa Liang	1578	2007/2008 season (100%)	465	236	191	0	0
28	USA	Beatrisa Liang	1578	2006/2007 season (70%)	0	204	183	175	0
29	GBR	Jenna McCorkell	1565	2008/2009 season (100%)	362	213	0	203	182
29	GBR	Jenna McCorkell	1565	2007/2008 season (100%)	402	0	0	203	0
29	GBR	Jenna McCorkell	1565	2006/2007 season (70%)	134	0	0	0	0
30	GER	Sarah Hecken	1542	2008/2009 season (100%)	380	203	164	203	0
30	GER	Sarah Hecken	1542	2007/2008 season (100%)	342	250	0	0	0
30	GER	Sarah Hecken	1542	2006/2007 season (70%)	0	0	0	0	0

==== Pairs ====
As of 26 March 2009

Rank	Nation	Couple	Points	Season	ISU Championships or Olympics	(Junior) Grand Prix and Final		Selected International Competition	
Rank	Nation	Couple	Points	Season	Best	Best	2nd Best	Best	2nd Best
1	GER	Aliona Savchenko / Robin Szolkowy	5252	2008/2009 season (100%)	1200	648	400	250	0
1	GER	Aliona Savchenko / Robin Szolkowy	5252	2007/2008 season (100%)	1200	800	400	250	0
1	GER	Aliona Savchenko / Robin Szolkowy	5252	2006/2007 season (70%)	680	504	280	0	0
2	CHN	Dan Zhang / Hao Zhang	4454	2008/2009 season (100%)	1080	720	400	0	0
2	CHN	Dan Zhang / Hao Zhang	4454	2007/2008 season (100%)	1080	720	400	0	0
2	CHN	Dan Zhang / Hao Zhang	4454	2006/2007 season (70%)	551	454	280	0	0
3	CHN	Qing Pang / Jian Tong	3963	2008/2009 season (100%)	875	800	400	0	0
3	CHN	Qing Pang / Jian Tong	3963	2007/2008 season (100%)	840	648	400	0	0
3	CHN	Qing Pang / Jian Tong	3963	2006/2007 season (70%)	756	252	0	0	0
4	RUS	Yuko Kavaguti / Alexander Smirnov	3871	2008/2009 season (100%)	972	525	400	250	0
4	RUS	Yuko Kavaguti / Alexander Smirnov	3871	2007/2008 season (100%)	875	525	324	0	0
4	RUS	Yuko Kavaguti / Alexander Smirnov	3871	2006/2007 season (70%)	362	227	0	0	0
5	CAN	Jessica Dube / Bryce Davison	3395	2008/2009 season (100%)	756	360	324	0	0
5	CAN	Jessica Dube / Bryce Davison	3395	2007/2008 season (100%)	972	583	400	0	0
5	CAN	Jessica Dube / Bryce Davison	3395	2006/2007 season (70%)	447	0	0	0	0
6	RUS	Maria Mukhortova / Maxim Trankov	3216	2008/2009 season (100%)	787	472	360	225	0
6	RUS	Maria Mukhortova / Maxim Trankov	3216	2007/2008 season (100%)	756	324	292	0	0
6	RUS	Maria Mukhortova / Maxim Trankov	3216	2006/2007 season (70%)	293	183	149	0	0
7	UKR	Tatiana Volosozhar / Stanislav Morozov	3022	2008/2009 season (100%)	709	583	360	203	0
7	UKR	Tatiana Volosozhar / Stanislav Morozov	3022	2007/2008 season (100%)	612	292	262	0	0
7	UKR	Tatiana Volosozhar / Stanislav Morozov	3022	2006/2007 season (70%)	613	0	0	0	0
8	RUS	Ksenia Krasilnikova / Konstantin Bezmaternikh	2846	2008/2009 season (100%)	0	486	250	0	0
8	RUS	Ksenia Krasilnikova / Konstantin Bezmaternikh	2846	2007/2008 season (100%)	715	600	262	0	0
8	RUS	Ksenia Krasilnikova / Konstantin Bezmaternikh	2846	2006/2007 season (70%)	405	378	175	0	0
9	USA	Keauna McLaughlin / Rockne Brubaker	2552	2008/2009 season (100%)	551	360	324	0	0
9	USA	Keauna McLaughlin / Rockne Brubaker	2552	2007/2008 season (100%)	0	360	360	0	0
9	USA	Keauna McLaughlin / Rockne Brubaker	2552	2006/2007 season (70%)	501	420	175	0	0
10	CAN	Meagan Duhamel / Craig Buntin	2398	2008/2009 season (100%)	612	324	292	0	0
10	CAN	Meagan Duhamel / Craig Buntin	2398	2007/2008 season (100%)	709	236	0	225	0
10	CAN	Meagan Duhamel / Craig Buntin	2398	2006/2007 season (70%)	0	0	0	0	0
10	USA	Rena Inoue / John Baldwin	2398	2008/2009 season (100%)	446	360	262	0	0
10	USA	Rena Inoue / John Baldwin	2398	2007/2008 season (100%)	612	0	0	0	0
10	USA	Rena Inoue / John Baldwin	2398	2006/2007 season (70%)	476	408	280	0	0
12	RUS	Lubov Iliushechkina / Nodari Maisuradze	2251	2008/2009 season (100%)	715	600	292	0	0
12	RUS	Lubov Iliushechkina / Nodari Maisuradze	2251	2007/2008 season (100%)	644	0	0	0	0
12	RUS	Lubov Iliushechkina / Nodari Maisuradze	2251	2006/2007 season (70%)	0	0	0	0	0
13	RUS	Ekaterina Sheremetieva / Mikhail Kuznetsov	2169	2008/2009 season (100%)	469	225	0	164	0
13	RUS	Ekaterina Sheremetieva / Mikhail Kuznetsov	2169	2007/2008 season (100%)	521	540	250	0	0
13	RUS	Ekaterina Sheremetieva / Mikhail Kuznetsov	2169	2006/2007 season (70%)	0	0	0	0	0
14	CHN	Yue Zhang / Lei Wang	2135	2008/2009 season (100%)	342	540	262	0	0
14	CHN	Yue Zhang / Lei Wang	2135	2007/2008 season (100%)	380	319	292	0	0
14	CHN	Yue Zhang / Lei Wang	2135	2006/2007 season (70%)	0	0	0	0	0
15	GBR	Stacey Kemp / David King	1930	2008/2009 season (100%)	339	292	0	250	0
15	GBR	Stacey Kemp / David King	1930	2007/2008 season (100%)	496	213	191	0	0
15	GBR	Stacey Kemp / David King	1930	2006/2007 season (70%)	205	149	0	0	0
16	FRA	Adeline Canac / Maximin Coia	1768	2008/2009 season (100%)	362	236	213	203	0
16	FRA	Adeline Canac / Maximin Coia	1768	2007/2008 season (100%)	305	236	213	0	0
16	FRA	Adeline Canac / Maximin Coia	1768	2006/2007 season (70%)	166	149	0	0	0
17	CAN	Anabelle Langlois / Cody Hay	1658	2008/2009 season (100%)	0	0	0	0	0
17	CAN	Anabelle Langlois / Cody Hay	1658	2007/2008 season (100%)	574	292	262	0	0
17	CAN	Anabelle Langlois / Cody Hay	1658	2006/2007 season (70%)	326	204	0	0	0
18	USA	Tiffany Vise / Derek Trent	1644	2008/2009 season (100%)	0	262	262	0	0
18	USA	Tiffany Vise / Derek Trent	1644	2007/2008 season (100%)	402	292	262	164	0
18	USA	Tiffany Vise / Derek Trent	1644	2006/2007 season (70%)	0	183	165	0	0
19	CAN	Amanda Velenosi / Mark Fernandez	1642	2008/2009 season (100%)	0	213	164	0	0
19	CAN	Amanda Velenosi / Mark Fernandez	1642	2007/2008 season (100%)	308	437	225	0	0
19	CAN	Amanda Velenosi / Mark Fernandez	1642	2006/2007 season (70%)	295	142	104	0	0
20	CAN	Mylene Brodeur / John Mattatall	1566	2008/2009 season (100%)	465	292	236	0	0
20	CAN	Mylene Brodeur / John Mattatall	1566	2007/2008 season (100%)	446	0	0	0	0
20	CAN	Mylene Brodeur / John Mattatall	1566	2006/2007 season (70%)	0	0	0	127	0
21	CHN	Huibo Dong / Yiming Wu	1557	2008/2009 season (100%)	362	292	191	0	0
21	CHN	Huibo Dong / Yiming Wu	1557	2007/2008 season (100%)	579	133	0	0	0
21	CHN	Huibo Dong / Yiming Wu	1557	2006/2007 season (70%)	0	0	0	0	0
22	EST	Maria Sergejeva / Ilja Glebov	1547	2008/2009 season (100%)	224	262	148	0	0
22	EST	Maria Sergejeva / Ilja Glebov	1547	2007/2008 season (100%)	422	236	213	0	0
22	EST	Maria Sergejeva / Ilja Glebov	1547	2006/2007 season (70%)	266	93	76	0	0
23	CHN	Jiaqi Li / Jiankun Xu	1520	2008/2009 season (100%)	0	0	0	0	0
23	CHN	Jiaqi Li / Jiankun Xu	1520	2007/2008 season (100%)	496	262	236	0	0
23	CHN	Jiaqi Li / Jiankun Xu	1520	2006/2007 season (70%)	194	183	149	0	0
24	RUS	Vera Bazarova / Yuri Larionov	1406	2008/2009 season (100%)	0	0	0	0	0
24	RUS	Vera Bazarova / Yuri Larionov	1406	2007/2008 season (100%)	0	324	250	0	0
24	RUS	Vera Bazarova / Yuri Larionov	1406	2006/2007 season (70%)	451	223	158	0	0
25	RUS	Anastasia Martiusheva / Alexei Rogonov	1331	2008/2009 season (100%)	644	437	250	0	0
25	RUS	Anastasia Martiusheva / Alexei Rogonov	1331	2007/2008 season (100%)	0	0	0	0	0
25	RUS	Anastasia Martiusheva / Alexei Rogonov	1331	2006/2007 season (70%)	0	0	0	0	0
26	POL	Dominika Piatkowska / Dmitri Khromin	1324	2008/2009 season (100%)	0	0	0	0	0
26	POL	Dominika Piatkowska / Dmitri Khromin	1324	2007/2008 season (100%)	362	213	213	0	0
26	POL	Dominika Piatkowska / Dmitri Khromin	1324	2006/2007 season (70%)	237	165	134	0	0
27	ITA	Laura Magitteri / Ondrej Hotárek	1255	2008/2009 season (100%)	0	236	0	0	0
27	ITA	Laura Magitteri / Ondrej Hotárek	1255	2007/2008 season (100%)	339	236	191	0	0
27	ITA	Laura Magitteri / Ondrej Hotárek	1255	2006/2007 season (70%)	253	0	0	0	0
28	USA	Brooke Castile / Benjamin Okolski	1241	2008/2009 season (100%)	0	0	0	0	0
28	USA	Brooke Castile / Benjamin Okolski	1241	2007/2008 season (100%)	680	0	0	0	0
28	USA	Brooke Castile / Benjamin Okolski	1241	2006/2007 season (70%)	386	0	0	175	0
29	JPN	Narumi Takahashi / Mervin Tran	1214	2008/2009 season (100%)	380	319	203	0	0
29	JPN	Narumi Takahashi / Mervin Tran	1214	2007/2008 season (100%)	164	148	0	0	0
29	JPN	Narumi Takahashi / Mervin Tran	1214	2006/2007 season (70%)	0	0	0	0	0
30	USA	Marissa Castelli / Simon Shnapir	1212	2008/2009 season (100%)	579	354	182	0	0
30	USA	Marissa Castelli / Simon Shnapir	1212	2007/2008 season (100%)	0	97	0	0	0
30	USA	Marissa Castelli / Simon Shnapir	1212	2006/2007 season (70%)	0	0	0	0	0

==== Ice dance ====
As of 28 March 2009

Rank	Nation	Couple	Points	Season	ISU Championships or Olympics	(Junior) Grand Prix and Final		Selected International Competition	
Rank	Nation	Couple	Points	Season	Best	Best	2nd Best	Best	2nd Best
1	RUS	Oksana Domnina / Maxim Shabalin	4589	2008/2009 season (100%)	1200	720	400	0	0
1	RUS	Oksana Domnina / Maxim Shabalin	4589	2007/2008 season (100%)	840	800	400	0	0
1	RUS	Oksana Domnina / Maxim Shabalin	4589	2006/2007 season (70%)	551	454	280	175	0
2	FRA	Isabelle Delobel / Olivier Schoenfelder	4319	2008/2009 season (100%)	0	800	400	0	0
2	FRA	Isabelle Delobel / Olivier Schoenfelder	4319	2007/2008 season (100%)	1200	648	400	250	0
2	FRA	Isabelle Delobel / Olivier Schoenfelder	4319	2006/2007 season (70%)	613	408	252	0	0
3	USA	Tanith Belbin / Benjamin Agosto	3795	2008/2009 season (100%)	1080	360	360	0	0
3	USA	Tanith Belbin / Benjamin Agosto	3795	2007/2008 season (100%)	875	720	400	0	0
3	USA	Tanith Belbin / Benjamin Agosto	3795	2006/2007 season (70%)	680	280	252	0	0
4	CAN	Tessa Virtue / Scott Moir	3491	2008/2009 season (100%)	972	0	0	0	0
4	CAN	Tessa Virtue / Scott Moir	3491	2007/2008 season (100%)	1080	583	400	0	0
4	CAN	Tessa Virtue / Scott Moir	3491	2006/2007 season (70%)	496	252	204	0	0
5	RUS	Jana Khokhlova / Sergei Novitski	3465	2008/2009 season (100%)	840	400	324	0	0
5	RUS	Jana Khokhlova / Sergei Novitski	3465	2007/2008 season (100%)	972	525	360	0	0
5	RUS	Jana Khokhlova / Sergei Novitski	3465	2006/2007 season (70%)	428	368	252	0	0
6	USA	Meryl Davis / Charlie White	3295	2008/2009 season (100%)	875	648	400	0	0
6	USA	Meryl Davis / Charlie White	3295	2007/2008 season (100%)	756	324	292	0	0
6	USA	Meryl Davis / Charlie White	3295	2006/2007 season (70%)	447	204	204	0	0
7	USA	Emily Samuelson / Evan Bates	3179	2008/2009 season (100%)	680	324	292	250	0
7	USA	Emily Samuelson / Evan Bates	3179	2007/2008 season (100%)	715	540	250	0	0
7	USA	Emily Samuelson / Evan Bates	3179	2006/2007 season (70%)	0	378	175	0	0
8	ITA	Federica Faiella / Massimo Scali	3174	2008/2009 season (100%)	756	583	400	0	0
8	ITA	Federica Faiella / Massimo Scali	3174	2007/2008 season (100%)	787	324	324	0	0
8	ITA	Federica Faiella / Massimo Scali	3174	2006/2007 season (70%)	362	227	227	0	0
9	FRA	Nathalie Péchalat / Fabian Bourzat	2941	2008/2009 season (100%)	787	360	324	0	0
9	FRA	Nathalie Péchalat / Fabian Bourzat	2941	2007/2008 season (100%)	638	472	360	0	0
9	FRA	Nathalie Péchalat / Fabian Bourzat	2941	2006/2007 season (70%)	264	227	149	0	0
10	GBR	Sinead Kerr / John Kerr	2881	2008/2009 season (100%)	680	324	324	250	0
10	GBR	Sinead Kerr / John Kerr	2881	2007/2008 season (100%)	574	292	262	0	0
10	GBR	Sinead Kerr / John Kerr	2881	2006/2007 season (70%)	386	204	183	175	0
11	RUS	Kristina Gorshkova / Vitali Butikov	2718	2008/2009 season (100%)	0	292	262	225	203
11	RUS	Kristina Gorshkova / Vitali Butikov	2718	2007/2008 season (100%)	579	486	250	0	0
11	RUS	Kristina Gorshkova / Vitali Butikov	2718	2006/2007 season (70%)	365	306	175	0	0
12	CAN	Vanessa Crone / Paul Poirier	2595	2008/2009 season (100%)	612	360	292	0	0
12	CAN	Vanessa Crone / Paul Poirier	2595	2007/2008 season (100%)	644	437	250	0	0
12	CAN	Vanessa Crone / Paul Poirier	2595	2006/2007 season (70%)	216	142	115	0	0
13	USA	Madison Hubbell / Keiffer Hubbell	2375	2008/2009 season (100%)	521	540	250	0	0
13	USA	Madison Hubbell / Keiffer Hubbell	2375	2007/2008 season (100%)	469	0	0	0	0
13	USA	Madison Hubbell / Keiffer Hubbell	2375	2006/2007 season (70%)	295	420	175	0	0
14	USA	Kimberly Navarro / Brent Bommentre	2288	2008/2009 season (100%)	496	262	236	0	0
14	USA	Kimberly Navarro / Brent Bommentre	2288	2007/2008 season (100%)	680	236	236	0	0
14	USA	Kimberly Navarro / Brent Bommentre	2288	2006/2007 season (70%)	386	165	165	142	0
15	ITA	Anna Cappellini / Luca Lanotte	2252	2008/2009 season (100%)	551	292	292	0	0
15	ITA	Anna Cappellini / Luca Lanotte	2252	2007/2008 season (100%)	465	360	292	0	0
15	ITA	Anna Cappellini / Luca Lanotte	2252	2006/2007 season (70%)	281	183	134	0	0
16	RUS	Ekaterina Riazanova / Jonathan Guerreiro	2249	2008/2009 season (100%)	579	486	250	0	0
16	RUS	Ekaterina Riazanova / Jonathan Guerreiro	2249	2007/2008 season (100%)	422	287	225	0	0
16	RUS	Ekaterina Riazanova / Jonathan Guerreiro	2249	2006/2007 season (70%)	0	76	0	0	0
17	USA	Madison Chock / Greg Zuerlein	2209	2008/2009 season (100%)	715	600	250	0	0
17	USA	Madison Chock / Greg Zuerlein	2209	2007/2008 season (100%)	0	394	250	0	0
17	USA	Madison Chock / Greg Zuerlein	2209	2006/2007 season (70%)	0	0	0	0	0
18	ISR	Alexandra Zaretski / Roman Zaretski	2203	2008/2009 season (100%)	339	262	213	225	0
18	ISR	Alexandra Zaretski / Roman Zaretski	2203	2007/2008 season (100%)	517	292	213	0	0
18	ISR	Alexandra Zaretski / Roman Zaretski	2203	2006/2007 season (70%)	214	204	134	142	0
19	RUS	Ekaterina Bobrova / Dmitri Soloviev	2026	2008/2009 season (100%)	0	292	236	0	0
19	RUS	Ekaterina Bobrova / Dmitri Soloviev	2026	2007/2008 season (100%)	339	292	262	0	0
19	RUS	Ekaterina Bobrova / Dmitri Soloviev	2026	2006/2007 season (70%)	501	340	175	0	0
20	CAN	Kaitlyn Weaver / Andrew Poje	2000	2008/2009 season (100%)	551	236	213	0	0
20	CAN	Kaitlyn Weaver / Andrew Poje	2000	2007/2008 season (100%)	551	236	213	0	0
20	CAN	Kaitlyn Weaver / Andrew Poje	2000	2006/2007 season (70%)	405	142	142	0	0
21	FRA	Pernelle Carron / Matthieu Jost	1989	2008/2009 season (100%)	517	262	262	0	0
21	FRA	Pernelle Carron / Matthieu Jost	1989	2007/2008 season (100%)	362	324	262	0	0
21	FRA	Pernelle Carron / Matthieu Jost	1989	2006/2007 season (70%)	253	183	134	0	0
22	AZE	Kristin Fraser / Igor Lukanin	1864	2008/2009 season (100%)	362	236	0	0	0
22	AZE	Kristin Fraser / Igor Lukanin	1864	2007/2008 season (100%)	418	262	262	0	0
22	AZE	Kristin Fraser / Igor Lukanin	1864	2006/2007 season (70%)	312	149	0	175	0
23	UKR	Anna Zadorozhniuk / Sergei Verbillo	1752	2008/2009 season (100%)	446	262	191	0	0
23	UKR	Anna Zadorozhniuk / Sergei Verbillo	1752	2007/2008 season (100%)	293	324	236	0	0
23	UKR	Anna Zadorozhniuk / Sergei Verbillo	1752	2006/2007 season (70%)	228	165	0	0	0
24	UKR	Alisa Agafonova / Dmitri Dun	1730	2008/2009 season (100%)	202	319	250	0	0
24	UKR	Alisa Agafonova / Dmitri Dun	1730	2007/2008 season (100%)	380	354	225	0	0
24	UKR	Alisa Agafonova / Dmitri Dun	1730	2006/2007 season (70%)	0	158	127	0	0
25	CAN	Kharis Ralph / Asher Hill	1705	2008/2009 season (100%)	469	354	225	0	0
25	CAN	Kharis Ralph / Asher Hill	1705	2007/2008 season (100%)	342	182	133	0	0
25	CAN	Kharis Ralph / Asher Hill	1705	2006/2007 season (70%)	0	0	0	0	0
26	RUS	Maria Monko / Ilia Tkachenko	1699	2008/2009 season (100%)	0	0	0	0	0
26	RUS	Maria Monko / Ilia Tkachenko	1699	2007/2008 season (100%)	521	600	250	0	0
26	RUS	Maria Monko / Ilia Tkachenko	1699	2006/2007 season (70%)	328	0	0	0	0
27	BUL	Albena Denkova / Maxim Staviski	1680	2008/2009 season (100%)	0	0	0	0	0
27	BUL	Albena Denkova / Maxim Staviski	1680	2007/2008 season (100%)	0	0	0	0	0
27	BUL	Albena Denkova / Maxim Staviski	1680	2006/2007 season (70%)	840	560	280	0	0
28	LTU	Katherine Copely / Deividas Stagniūnas	1664	2008/2009 season (100%)	325	236	191	0	0
28	LTU	Katherine Copely / Deividas Stagniūnas	1664	2007/2008 season (100%)	305	262	0	203	0
28	LTU	Katherine Copely / Deividas Stagniūnas	1664	2006/2007 season (70%)	98	0	0	142	0
29	GER	Carolina Hermann / Daniel Hermann	1572	2008/2009 season (100%)	264	0	0	225	225
29	GER	Carolina Hermann / Daniel Hermann	1572	2007/2008 season (100%)	0	191	0	225	164
29	GER	Carolina Hermann / Daniel Hermann	1572	2006/2007 season (70%)	194	84	0	0	0
30	CZE	Lucie Myslivečková / Matej Novák	1561	2008/2009 season (100%)	342	203	182	0	0
30	CZE	Lucie Myslivečková / Matej Novák	1561	2007/2008 season (100%)	224	225	182	203	0
30	CZE	Lucie Myslivečková / Matej Novák	1561	2006/2007 season (70%)	83	0	0	0	0
