= 2008 Skate Canada International =

- Type: Grand Prix
- Date: October 30 – November 2
- Season: 2008–09
- Location: Ottawa, Ontario
- Host: Skate Canada
- Venue: Scotiabank Place

Champions
- Men's singles: (Canada) Patrick Chan
- Ladies' singles: (Canada) Joannie Rochette
- Pairs: (Russia) Yuko Kawaguchi / Alexander Smirnov
- Ice dance: (United States) Meryl Davis / Charlie White
- Previous: 2007 Skate Canada International
- Next: 2009 Skate Canada International
- Previous Grand Prix: 2008 Skate America
- Next Grand Prix: 2008 Cup of China

The 2008 Skate Canada International was the second event of six in the 2008–09 ISU Grand Prix of Figure Skating, a senior-level international invitational competition series. It was held at the Scotiabank Place in Ottawa, Ontario on October 30 – November 2. Medals were awarded in the disciplines of men's singles, ladies' singles, pair skating, and ice dancing. Skaters earned points toward qualifying for the 2008–09 Grand Prix Final. The compulsory dance was the Pasodoble.

== Schedule ==
The switch from daylight saving time to standard time was on November 2. Therefore, the events on Friday and Saturday were UTC-4, and the events on Sunday were UTC-5.

- Friday, October 31
  - 12:05 Pairs' short program
  - 14:10 Ladies' short program
  - 18:30 Compulsory dance
  - 19:45 Men's short program
- Saturday, November 1
  - 10:45 Original dance
  - 13:25 Pairs' free skating
  - 16:05 Men's free skating
  - 17:45 Medal ceremonies - Men and pairs
  - 19:05 Ladies' free skating
  - 20:50 Medal ceremonies - Ladies
- Sunday, November 2
  - 12:15 Free dance
  - 13:30 Medal ceremonies - Ice dancing
  - 15:05 Exhibition gala

== Results ==
=== Men ===
Rank	Name	Nation	Total points	SP		FS	
1	Patrick Chan	Canada	215.45	2	77.47	3	137.98
2	Ryan Bradley	United States	212.75	3	72.50	2	140.25
3	Evan Lysacek	United States	209.27	4	71.40	4	137.87
4	Yannick Ponsero	France	208.97	1	78.05	6	130.92
5	Shawn Sawyer	Canada	206.56	7	64.20	1	142.36
6	Sergei Voronov	Russia	201.59	5	70.45	5	131.14
7	Brandon Mroz	United States	192.23	6	67.03	7	125.20
8	Yasuharu Nanri	Japan	177.84	9	63.36	9	114.48
9	Anton Kovalevski	Ukraine	170.61	8	64.06	10	106.55
10	Jeremy Ten	Canada	169.79	11	50.93	8	118.86
11	Vladimir Uspenski	Russia	150.50	10	56.17	11	94.33

=== Ladies ===
Rank	Name	Nation	Total points	SP		FS	
1	Joannie Rochette	Canada	188.89	1	64.74	1	124.15
2	Fumie Suguri	Japan	163.86	2	57.92	3	105.94
3	Alissa Czisny	United States	157.92	6	49.66	2	108.26
4	Carolina Kostner	Italy	152.76	7	48.56	4	104.20
5	Caroline Zhang	United States	150.80	3	53.28	5	97.52
6	Beatrisa Liang	United States	142.12	5	49.92	6	92.20
7	Jenna McCorkell	United Kingdom	139.37	4	51.64	8	87.73
8	Cynthia Phaneuf	Canada	133.47	9	45.06	7	88.41
9	Nana Takeda	Japan	128.93	8	45.14	9	83.79
10	Jenni Vähämaa	Finland	122.75	10	44.90	10	77.85
11	Jelena Glebova	Estonia	116.38	11	41.18	11	75.20
12	Myriane Samson	Canada	112.74	12	40.42	12	72.32

=== Pairs ===
Rank	Name	Nation	Total points	SP		FS	
1	Yuko Kawaguchi / Alexander Smirnov	Russia	176.97	1	65.02	2	111.95
2	Jessica Dubé / Bryce Davison	Canada	176.54	3	60.14	1	116.40
3	Keauna McLaughlin / Rockne Brubaker	United States	161.51	2	60.66	3	100.85
4	Mylène Brodeur / John Mattatall	Canada	149.14	6	50.76	4	98.38
5	Tiffany Vise / Derek Trent	United States	148.52	4	53.94	5	94.58
6	Rachel Kirkland / Eric Radford	Canada	141.66	7	50.08	6	91.58
7	Amanda Evora / Mark Ladwig	United States	138.14	8	47.04	7	91.10
8	Dong Huibo / Wu Yiming	China	127.17	5	50.84	8	76.33

=== Ice dancing ===
Rank	Name	Nation	Total points	CD		OD		FD	
1	Meryl Davis / Charlie White	United States	178.89	1	34.29	1	56.36	1	88.24
2	Vanessa Crone / Paul Poirier	Canada	162.13	4	31.11	3	49.13	2	81.89
3	Nathalie Péchalat / Fabian Bourzat	France	159.06	2	33.90	6	47.37	3	77.79
4	Kristina Gorshkova / Vitali Butikov	Russia	157.83	5	30.50	2	49.82	4	77.51
5	Kimberly Navarro / Brent Bommentre	United States	157.54	3	31.67	4	48.68	5	77.19
6	Ekaterina Bobrova / Dmitri Soloviev	Russia	151.62	7	28.42	5	47.83	6	75.37
7	Jennifer Wester / Daniil Barantsev	United States	141.06	6	28.71	7	43.70	7	68.65
8	Andrea Chong / Guillame Gfeller	Canada	136.99	8	26.29	8	43.24	8	67.46
