= 2008 Cup of China =

- Type: Grand Prix
- Date: November 5 – 9
- Season: 2008–09
- Location: Beijing
- Host: Chinese Skating Association
- Venue: Beijing Capital Gymnasium

Champions
- Men's singles: (United States) Jeremy Abbott
- Ladies' singles: (South Korea) Kim Yuna
- Pairs: (China) Zhang Dan / Zhang Hao
- Ice dance: (Russia) Oksana Domnina / Maxim Shabalin
- Previous: 2007 Cup of China
- Next: 2009 Cup of China
- Previous GP: 2008 Skate Canada
- Next GP: 2008 Trophée Éric Bompard

The 2008 Cup of China was the third event of six in the 2008–09 ISU Grand Prix of Figure Skating, a senior-level international invitational competition series. It was held at the Beijing Capital Gymnasium in Beijing on November 5–9. Medals were awarded in the disciplines of men's singles, ladies' singles, pair skating, and ice dancing. Skaters earned points toward qualifying for the 2008–09 Grand Prix Final. The compulsory dance was the Viennese Waltz.

== Results ==
=== Men ===
Rank	Name	Nation	Total points	SP		FS	
1	Jeremy Abbott	United States	233.44	1	77.05	1	156.39
2	Stephen Carriere	United States	217.25	3	72.00	2	145.25
3	Tomáš Verner	Czech Republic	205.48	4	65.55	3	139.93
4	Artem Borodulin	Russia	191.38	5	65.05	4	126.33
5	Vaughn Chipeur	Canada	187.50	2	72.70	7	114.80
6	Wu Jialiang	China	177.75	8	59.75	6	118.00
7	Jeremy Ten	Canada	175.12	10	55.81	5	119.31
8	Kristoffer Berntsson	Sweden	173.93	6	64.81	8	109.12
9	Gao Song	China	166.93	9	59.31	9	107.62
10	Kensuke Nakaniwa	Japan	164.94	7	61.90	11	103.04
11	Xu Ming	China	157.28	11	53.28	10	104.00

=== Ladies ===
Rank	Name	Nation	Total points	SP		FS	
1	Kim Yuna	South Korea	191.75	1	63.64	1	128.11
2	Miki Ando	Japan	170.88	2	59.30	2	111.58
3	Laura Lepistö	Finland	159.42	3	58.60	3	100.82
4	Ashley Wagner	United States	155.59	4	55.40	4	100.19
5	Susanna Pöykiö	Finland	148.03	6	50.00	5	98.03
6	Sarah Meier	Switzerland	142.31	7	48.10	6	94.21
7	Alena Leonova	Russia	137.27	8	44.04	7	93.23
8	Katrina Hacker	United States	134.95	5	50.80	8	84.15
9	Liu Yan	China	118.07	9	42.06	10	76.01
10	Xu Binshu	China	116.59	11	37.02	9	79.57
11	Mira Leung	Canada	114.05	10	40.76	11	73.29
12	Wang Yueren	China	95.68	12	34.66	12	61.02

=== Pairs ===
Rank	Name	Nation	Total points	SP		FS	
1	Zhang Dan / Zhang Hao	China	182.22	1	67.12	1	115.10
2	Tatiana Volosozhar / Stanislav Morozov	Ukraine	175.05	2	60.34	2	114.71
3	Pang Qing / Tong Jian	China	171.86	3	59.36	3	112.50
4	Amanda Evora / Mark Ladwig	United States	143.88	4	51.48	5	92.40
5	Zhang Yue / Wang Lei	China	142.10	5	51.02	6	91.08
6	Mylène Brodeur / John Mattatall	Canada	141.59	6	46.78	4	94.81
7	Chelsi Guillen / Danny Curzon	United States	100.74	7	35.56	7	65.18

=== Ice dancing ===
Rank	Name	Nation	Total points	CD		OD		FD	
1	Oksana Domnina / Maxim Shabalin	Russia	186.77	1	38.34	2	57.24	1	91.19
2	Tanith Belbin / Benjamin Agosto	United States	186.41	2	37.15	1	58.08	2	91.18
3	Jana Khokhlova / Sergei Novitski	Russia	179.50	3	35.68	4	55.12	3	88.70
4	Anna Cappellini / Luca Lanotte	Italy	173.11	4	32.52	3	55.22	4	85.37
5	Anna Zadorozhniuk / Sergei Verbillo	Ukraine	158.90	7	29.68	5	49.98	5	79.24
6	Kaitlyn Weaver / Andrew Poje	Canada	157.20	6	29.91	6	48.77	6	78.52
7	Alexandra Zaretski / Roman Zaretski	Israel	148.17	5	30.45	7	47.36	7	70.36
8	Yu Xiaoyang / Wang Chen	China	139.66	9	25.85	9	45.90	8	67.91
9	Huang Xintong / Zheng Xun	China	133.40	8	26.82	8	46.03	9	60.55
10	Guo Jiameimei / Meng Fei	China	115.15	10	21.97	10	34.83	10	58.35
