= Figure skating season =

July 1 to June 30 competition period

The figure skating season is the period of time in which competitions are contested in the sport of figure skating. The skating season begins on July 1 of one year and lasts until June 30 of the next year, thus spanning a full 12 months. The seasons are referred to by the years they span; for example, the 2017–18 figure skating season began in July 2017 and ended in June 2018.

== Fall internationals ==
Fall international events have existed for decades. In 1995, the International Skating Union brought five of the most popular senior events together into a series offering prize money in response to the then-success of professional skating. The events were Skate America, Skate Canada International, Trophée de France, Nations Cup (later known as Sparkassen Cup and Bofrost Cup), and the NHK Trophy. They comprised the Champions Series, since renamed the Grand Prix of Figure Skating, and took up the fall. They concluded with a Final held in the spring before the World Championships in which the top six skaters in each discipline compete against each other. In 2001, the Final was moved to December. This led to the confusion of having two Finals within one calendar year. In 1996, a sixth event was added: the Cup of Russia. The event in Germany was replaced in 2003 with the Cup of China.

Other internationals traditionally held in the fall exist independently of the Grand Prix circuit. In 2014, the ISU created the Challenger Series, a circuit of 10 senior events below the Grand Prix series, but above other international events. The series includes long-existing events such as the Nebelhorn Trophy, and offers prize money for the top three skaters or couples in the series.

In 1997, the ISU instituted the ISU Junior Series, since renamed the ISU Junior Grand Prix, which contains more competitions than its senior counterpart. The Final was originally held in March, but was moved to December in 1999. The Junior Grand Prix currently holds its first competition in August and so kicks off the ISU calendar of competitions for the season.

== National championships ==
Most countries hold annual national championships, often referred to informally as "nationals". There is no set specific time in which national championships must be held. While some countries rely on the results of their nationals to choose the teams for the ISU Championships, others have more varied criteria depending on international placement or testing results.

== ISU Championships ==
The ISU holds five championships every season. Currently, the first one to be held is the European Figure Skating Championships. It usually takes place in January. The European Championships, often referred to informally as "Europeans", is the oldest of the five championships; it was first held in 1891 and sanctioned by the ISU in 1893. It is open to skaters from European member nations of the ISU.

The next one held is the Four Continents Figure Skating Championships. It usually takes place in early February. The Four Continents Championships were established in 1999 to be the equivalent of Europeans for skaters from non-European member nations.

The World Junior Figure Skating Championships, often informally called "Junior Worlds" or "World Juniors", were for many years held in late November or December. Following the 1998–1999 season, they were moved to late February/early March, and have been held after the Four Continents Championships. Even when they were held before the New Year, the events were officially referred to by the next calendar year, and the champions are listed in results by that year. For example, Ilia Klimkin, who won it in November 1998, is officially the 1999 World Junior champion. By ISU regulation, the World Junior Championships should be held in the first half of March. The World Junior Championships are open to skaters who fit into a certain age category. Currently, skaters must be between the ages of 13 and 19 (or 13 and 21 for the men in pairs and ice dance) in order to compete.

The World Figure Skating Championships, commonly referred to informally as "Worlds", are the next ISU Championship to be held. By ISU regulation, they must take place following the fourth Monday in February and there should be at least fourteen days between Worlds and the Four Continents Championships or European Championships, whichever happens later. The first World Championship was held in 1896. The World Championships are open to all member nations of the ISU.

The final ISU Championship of the year is the World Synchronized Skating Championships.

== The Olympics ==
Every four years, figure skating is contested at the Olympic Winter Games. The Olympics usually take place in February. Since the inception of the Four Continents Championships, both the European and Four Continents Championships have been held before the Olympics, with the World Junior Championships, World Championships, and World Synchronized Skating Championships occurring after.

Unlike in some other sports, there are World Championships in Olympic years.

== Other competitions ==
Other international competitions take place throughout the season. These competitions do not hold the prestige of the Grand Prix or ISU championships, but have an ISU sanction. The international season typically ends with the Triglav Trophy, a competition for novice, junior, and senior-level skaters, held annually in April.

Club competitions take place over the year, with the largest usually taking place in the summer. Although summer club competitions can be large and attract high-level skaters, they are not prestigious events and do not count towards anything.

== Seasons ==
- 2008–2009 figure skating season
- 2009–2010 figure skating season
- 2010–2011 figure skating season
- 2011–2012 figure skating season
- 2012–2013 figure skating season
- 2013–2014 figure skating season
- 2014–2015 figure skating season
- 2015–2016 figure skating season
- 2016–2017 figure skating season
- 2017–2018 figure skating season
- 2018–2019 figure skating season
- 2019–2020 figure skating season
- 2020–2021 figure skating season
- 2021–2022 figure skating season
- 2022–2023 figure skating season
- 2023–2024 figure skating season
- 2024–2025 figure skating season
- 2025–2026 figure skating season
