= Yoann Deslot =

French figure skater

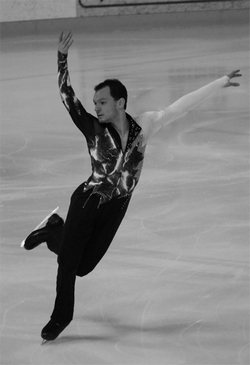
- Yoann Deslot during the French Championships in 2008

Personal information
- Born: 15 May 1984 (age 42) La Tronche, Isère, France
- Height: 1.80 m (5 ft 11 in)

Figure skating career
- Country: France
- Skating club: Champigny FSC
- Began skating: 1995
- Retired: 2008

Yoann Deslot (born 15 May 1984 in La Tronche) is a French former competitive figure skater. He placed 12th in his senior Grand Prix debut at the 2008 Trophée Eric Bompard.

== Programs ==
Season	Short program	Free skating	Exhibition
2008–09	Dien Bien Phu by Georges Delerue	Mr. & Mrs. Smith by John Powell	Fanfan by Nicolas Jorelle

== Competitive highlights ==
GP: Grand Prix; JGP: Junior Grand Prix

International
Event	01–02	02–03	03–04	04–05	05–06	06–07	07–08	08–09
GP Bompard								12th
Cup of Nice								8th
Universiade						23rd		9th
Crystal Skate					5th		1st	
Merano Cup				2nd	3rd			
Copenhagen				2nd				
International: Junior
JGP Canada		6th						
JGP France		9th						
National
French Champ.	16th	9th	9th	7th	7th		7th	4th
Masters					8th	4th	5th	4th
