= 2008 Trophée Éric Bompard =

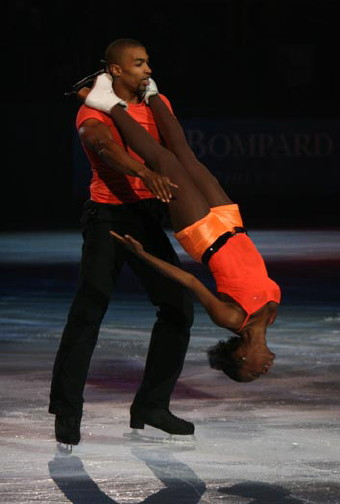
- Vanessa James & Yannick Bonheur performing at the 2008 Trophée Eric Bompard.
- Type: Grand Prix
- Date: November 13 – 16
- Season: 2008–09
- Location: Paris
- Host: Federation Française des Sports de Glace
- Venue: Palais omnisports de Paris-Bercy

Champions
- Men's singles: (Canada) Patrick Chan
- Ladies' singles: (Canada) Joannie Rochette
- Pairs: (Germany) Aliona Savchenko / Robin Szolkowy
- Ice dance: (France) Isabelle Delobel / Olivier Schoenfelder
- Previous: 2007 Trophée Éric Bompard
- Next: 2009 Trophée Éric Bompard
- Previous GP: 2008 Cup of China
- Next GP: 2008 Cup of Russia

The 2008 Trophée Éric Bompard was the fourth event of six in the 2008–09 ISU Grand Prix of Figure Skating, a senior-level international invitational competition series. It was held at the Palais omnisports de Paris-Bercy in Paris on November 13–16. Medals were awarded in the disciplines of men's singles, ladies' singles, pair skating, and ice dancing. Skaters earned points toward qualifying for the 2008–09 Grand Prix Final. The compulsory dance was the Paso Doble.

== Results ==
=== Men ===
Patrick Chan won his second Grand Prix title.

Rank	Name	Nation	Total points	SP		FS	
1	Patrick Chan	Canada	238.09	1	81.39	1	156.70
2	Takahiko Kozuka	Japan	230.78	2	77.00	2	153.78
3	Alban Préaubert	France	222.44	4	73.24	3	149.20
4	Brian Joubert	France	221.13	3	73.75	4	147.38
5	Brandon Mroz	United States	189.46	6	65.44	5	124.02
6	Peter Liebers	Germany	176.88	8	61.59	6	115.29
7	Ryan Bradley	United States	175.62	5	69.35	10	106.27
8	Wu Jialiang	China	169.36	7	62.74	9	106.62
9	Gregor Urbas	Slovenia	167.87	11	55.01	7	112.86
10	Igor Macypura	Slovakia	165.20	9	61.58	11	103.62
11	Andrei Lutai	Russia	160.10	12	53.33	8	106.77
12	Yoann Deslot	France	156.68	10	55.65	12	101.03

=== Ladies ===
Rank	Name	Nation	Total points	SP		FS	
1	Joannie Rochette	Canada	180.73	1	59.54	1	121.19
2	Mao Asada	Japan	167.59	2	58.12	2	109.47
3	Caroline Zhang	United States	156.54	3	51.76	3	104.78
4	Candice Didier	France	135.25	5	47.96	4	87.29
5	Beatrisa Liang	United States	134.29	4	49.60	5	84.69
6	Xu Binshu	China	123.83	10	40.68	6	83.15
7	Elene Gedevanishvili	Georgia	121.78	9	41.48	7	80.30
8	Anastasia Gimazetdinova	Uzbekistan	116.99	7	45.44	8	71.55
9	Emily Hughes	United States	115.48	8	44.32	9	71.16
10	Gwendoline Didier	France	111.18	6	47.58	10	63.60

=== Pairs ===
During the free skating, Meagan Duhamel accidentally sliced Craig Buntin's hand a minute into the program on their side-by-side salchow jumps and blood dripped on the ice; the pair stopped to get his hand bandaged and then completed the program to win the bronze medal.

Rank	Name	Nation	Total points	SP		FS	
1	Aliona Savchenko / Robin Szolkowy	Germany	188.50	1	68.18	1	120.32
2	Maria Mukhortova / Maxim Trankov	Russia	170.87	2	64.84	3	106.03
3	Meagan Duhamel / Craig Buntin	Canada	166.63	3	58.66	2	107.97
4	Dong Huibo / Wu Yiming	China	140.58	4	51.12	5	89.46
5	Tiffany Vise / Derek Trent	United States	140.00	6	46.48	4	93.52
6	Adeline Canac / Maximin Coia	France	135.64	5	47.54	6	88.10
7	Vanessa James / Yannick Bonheur	France	121.15	7	44.34	8	76.81
8	Mélodie Chataigner / Medhi Bouzzine	France	120.06	8	41.78	7	78.28

=== Ice dancing ===
Rank	Name	Nation	Total points	CD		OD		FD	
1	Isabelle Delobel / Olivier Schoenfelder	France	184.81	1	37.98	3	55.23	1	91.60
2	Federica Faiella / Massimo Scali	Italy	179.58	2	34.46	1	55.79	2	89.33
3	Sinead Kerr / John Kerr	United Kingdom	176.96	3	32.32	2	55.52	3	89.12
4	Vanessa Crone / Paul Poirier	Canada	171.49	5	31.75	4	52.71	4	87.03
5	Pernelle Carron / Mathieu Jost	France	166.84	4	31.77	5	52.22	5	82.85
6	Kristin Fraser / Igor Lukanin	Azerbaijan	158.53	6	30.05	6	49.94	7	78.54
7	Ekaterina Rubleva / Ivan Shefer	Russia	156.84	7	28.44	7	48.40	6	80.00
8	Jennifer Wester / Daniil Barantsev	United States	142.95	8	28.02	8	45.78	8	69.15
9	Zoé Blanc / Pierre-Loup Bouquet	France	134.46	9	25.19	9	43.02	9	66.25
10	Joanna Budner / Jan Mościcki	Poland	124.80	10	24.73	10	37.09	10	62.98
