= 2008 Skate America =

- Type: Grand Prix
- Date: October 23 – 26
- Season: 2008–09
- Location: Everett, Washington
- Host: U.S. Figure Skating
- Venue: Comcast Arena at Everett

Champions
- Men's singles: (Japan) Takahiko Kozuka
- Ladies' singles: (South Korea) Kim Yuna
- Pairs: (Germany) Aliona Savchenko / Robin Szolkowy
- Ice dance: (France) Isabelle Delobel / Olivier Schoenfelder
- Previous: 2007 Skate America
- Next: 2009 Skate America
- Previous Grand Prix: –
- Next Grand Prix: 2008 Skate Canada International

The 2008 Skate America was the first event of six in the 2008–09 ISU Grand Prix of Figure Skating, a senior-level international invitational competition series. It was held at the Comcast Arena at Everett in Everett, Washington on October 23–26. Medals were awarded in the disciplines of men's singles, ladies' singles, pair skating, and ice dancing. Skaters earned points toward qualifying for the 2008–09 Grand Prix Final. The compulsory dance was the Viennese Waltz.

The event drew 39,000 total spectators.

== Schedule ==
All times are Pacific Daylight Time (UTC-7).

- Friday, October 24
  - 3:05 p.m. – Ice dancing: Compulsory dance
  - 7:35 p.m. – Pair skating: Short program
  - 9:05 p.m. – Men's singles: Short program
- Saturday, October 25
  - 2:08 p.m. – Ice dancing: Original dance
  - 3:50 p.m. – Pair skating: Free skating
  - 7:08 p.m. – Ladies' singles: Short program
  - 9:10 p.m. – Men's singles: Free skating
- Sunday, October 26
  - 11:08 a.m. – Ice dancing: Free dance
  - 1:07 p.m. – Ladies' singles: Free skating
  - 5:00 p.m. – Exhibition of Champions

== Results ==
=== Men ===
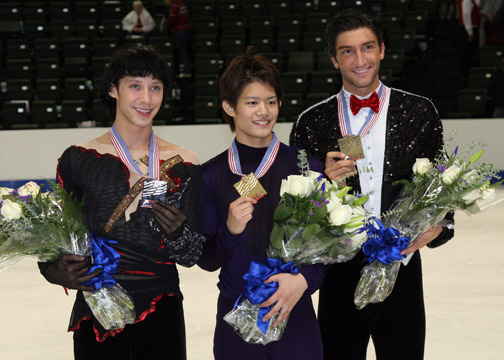
Men's Podium; From left to right: Johnny Weir (2nd), Takahiko Kozuka (1st), Evan Lysacek (3rd).

Rank	Name	Nation	Total points	SP		FS	
1	Takahiko Kozuka	Japan	226.18	3	80.10	1	146.08
2	Johnny Weir	United States	225.20	2	80.55	2	144.65
3	Evan Lysacek	United States	223.21	1	81.30	3	141.91
4	Kevin Reynolds	Canada	204.89	4	67.18	4	137.71
5	Shawn Sawyer	Canada	199.98	6	64.14	5	135.84
6	Alexander Uspenski	Russia	177.81	7	59.63	6	118.18
7	Adrian Schultheiss	Sweden	177.26	5	64.40	9	112.86
8	Adam Rippon	United States	174.82	8	59.60	7	115.22
9	Igor Macypura	Slovakia	169.61	9	54.58	8	115.03
10	Ian Martinez	Canada	155.18	10	50.68	10	104.50

=== Ladies ===
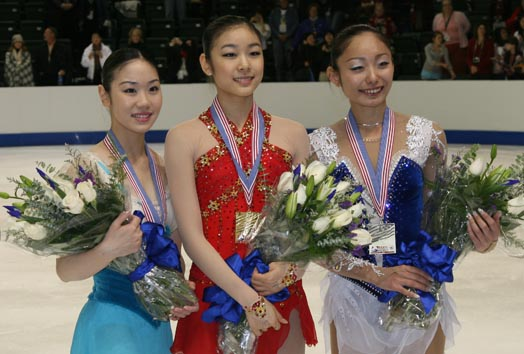
Ladies' Podium; From left to right: Yukari Nakano (2nd), Kim Yuna (1st), Miki Ando (3rd).

Rank	Name	Nation	Total points	SP		FS	
1	Kim Yuna	South Korea	193.45	1	69.50	1	123.95
2	Yukari Nakano	Japan	172.53	3	57.46	2	115.07
3	Miki Ando	Japan	168.42	2	57.80	3	110.62
4	Rachael Flatt	United States	155.73	5	54.92	4	100.81
5	Mirai Nagasu	United States	142.90	4	56.42	7	86.48
6	Susanna Pöykiö	Finland	142.14	8	47.82	5	94.32
7	Mira Leung	Canada	136.16	10	45.74	6	90.42
8	Kimmie Meissner	United States	135.92	6	54.90	9	81.02
9	Liu Yan	China	128.12	9	46.96	8	81.16
10	Annette Dytrt	Germany	116.83	7	48.32	11	68.51
11	Tuğba Karademir	Turkey	113.91	11	41.26	10	72.65
WD	Valentina Marchei	Italy					

=== Pairs ===
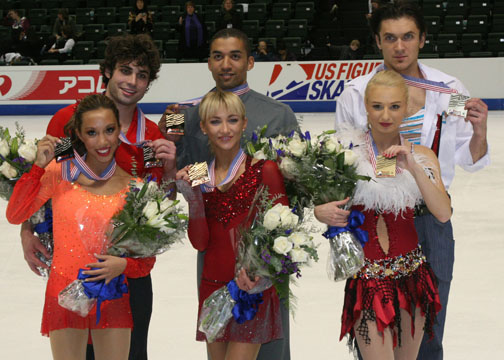
Pairs' podium; From left to right: Keauna McLaughlin / Rockne Brubaker (2nd), Aliona Savchenko / Robin Szolkowy (1st), Maria Mukhortova / Maxim Trankov (3rd).

Rank	Name	Nation	Total points	SP		FS	
1	Aliona Savchenko / Robin Szolkowy	Germany	180.77	2	64.08	1	116.69
2	Keauna McLaughlin / Rockne Brubaker	United States	172.69	3	57.02	2	115.67
3	Maria Mukhortova / Maxim Trankov	Russia	167.67	1	66.32	4	101.35
4	Meagan Duhamel / Craig Buntin	Canada	159.80	4	54.26	3	105.54
5	Rena Inoue / John Baldwin	United States	146.51	5	50.00	5	96.51
6	Caitlin Yankowskas / John Coughlin	United States	141.70	6	48.40	6	93.30
7	Adeline Canac / Maximin Coia	France	134.36	8	44.00	7	90.36
8	Zhang Yue / Wang Lei	China	124.63	7	44.60	8	80.03

=== Ice dancing ===
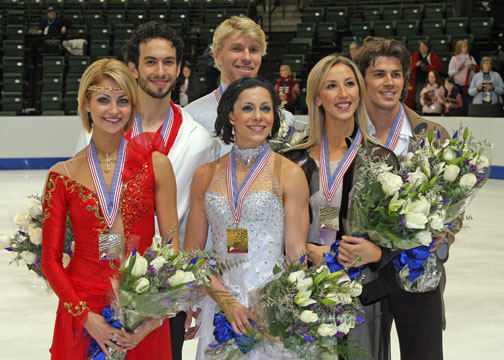
Ice dancing podium; From left to right: Tanith Belbin / Benjamin Agosto (2nd), Isabelle Delobel / Olivier Schoenfelder (1st), Sinead Kerr / John Kerr (3rd).

Rank	Name	Nation	Total points	CD		OD		FD	
1	Isabelle Delobel / Olivier Schoenfelder	France	187.64	1	38.49	1	58.26	2	90.89
2	Tanith Belbin / Benjamin Agosto	United States	186.53	2	37.63	3	57.47	1	91.43
3	Sinead Kerr / John Kerr	United Kingdom	180.20	3	34.37	2	57.74	4	88.09
4	Emily Samuelson / Evan Bates	United States	175.66	5	31.81	4	55.01	3	88.84
5	Pernelle Carron / Mathieu Jost	France	166.92	4	32.26	5	52.74	5	81.92
6	Ekaterina Rubleva / Ivan Shefer	Russia	159.03	7	28.41	7	50.37	6	80.25
7	Jane Summersett / Todd Gilles	United States	156.62	8	27.50	6	50.51	7	78.61
8	Katherine Copely / Deividas Stagniūnas	Lithuania	156.28	6	29.78	8	48.38	8	78.12
9	Allie Hann-McCurdy / Michael Coreno	Canada	142.95	9	25.74	9	45.44	9	71.77
