= Sarah Paw =

Singaporean figure skater

- Born: March 8, 1992 (age 33)
- Height: 1.62 m (5 ft 4 in)

Figure skating career
- Country: Singapore

Sarah Paw Si Ying (born 8 March 1992) is a former Singaporean competitive figure skater. In 2007, she emerged as the winner of Singapore National Figure Skating Championships in the novice ladies' category.
