= Vladimir Uspenski =

Russian figure skater

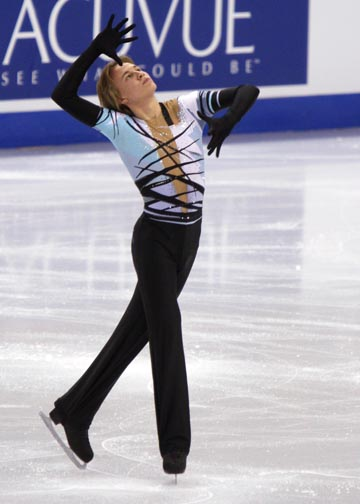
- Uspenski in 2008.

Personal information
- Full name: Vladimir Sergeyevich Uspenski
- Born: 7 February 1989 (age 37) Moscow, Russian SFSR, Soviet Union
- Height: 1.76 m (5 ft 9 in)

Figure skating career
- Country: Russia
- Skating club: Moskvitch
- Began skating: 1994
- Retired: 2010

Vladimir Sergeyevich Uspenski (Russian: Владимир Серге́евич Успенский; born 7 February 1989) is a Russian former competitive figure skater. He is the 2007 Golden Spin of Zagreb bronze medalist and competed at one senior Grand Prix event.

He is the younger brother of Alexander Uspenski.

== Programs ==
Season	Short program	Free skating
2008–09	Winter (from The Four Seasons) by Antonio Vivaldi (modern arrangement)	Notre-Dame de Paris by Riccardo Cocciante; Les Temps des Cathedrales; Les Sans-Papiers; Tu Vas Me Detruire

== Competitive highlights ==
GP: Grand Prix; JGP: Junior Grand Prix

International
Event	02–03	03–04	04–05	05–06	06–07	07–08	08–09	09–10
GP Skate Canada							11th	
Golden Spin						3rd	7th	
Finlandia							12th	
Universiade					13th		17th	
International: Junior
JGP Croatia				11th		4th		
JGP Czech Rep.					9th			
JGP Estonia				4th				
JGP Germany						8th		
JGP Norway					3rd			
JGP Serbia			7th					
Triglav Trophy	7th J.							
National
Russian Champ.					10th	6th	4th	11th
Russian Junior				5th	6th	3rd		
J. = Junior level
