= Wang Yueren =

Chinese figure skater

Personal information
- Born: June 21, 1991 (age 35)
- Height: 154 cm (5 ft 1 in)

Figure skating career
- Country: China
- Coach: Ying Liu
- Skating club: Heilongjian Province Team

Wang Yueren (Chinese: 王月人; pinyin: Wáng Yuèrén; born June 21, 1991, in Harbin, Heilongjiang) is a Chinese former competitive figure skater. She is the 2008 Chinese bronze medalist. She made her international debut at the 2007 Cup of China, where she placed 12th. At the 2008 Four Continents Championships, she was the highest placing Chinese lady.

== Competitive highlights ==
| Event | 2007-2008 | 2008-2009 | 2010-2011 |
|---|---|---|---|
| Four Continents Championships | 12th | 23rd | |
| Chinese Championships | 3rd | | 14th |
| Cup of China | 12th | 12th | |
| Winter Universiade | | 23rd | |
