= Mylène Brodeur =

Canadian figure skater

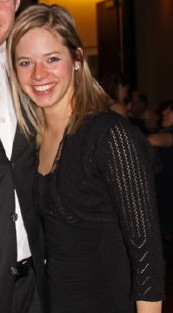

Personal information
- Born: April 17, 1987 (age 39) Saint-Jean-sur-Richelieu, Quebec

Figure skating career
- Country: Canada
- Skating club: CPA St.-Leonard
- Began skating: 1992
- Retired: March 25, 2011

Mylène Brodeur (born April 17, 1987) is a Canadian former figure skater who is best known for her pairs career with partner John Mattatall. They are the 2009 Canadian national bronze medalists and placed tenth at the 2009 World Championships.

== Career ==
As a single skater, Brodeur made her international debut at the 2004 Triglav Trophy, finishing 12th on the junior level. She placed fourth at the 2005–06 ISU Junior Grand Prix event in Slovakia.

In March 2006, Brodeur teamed up with John Mattatall to compete in pairs. She also continued to compete in singles. Brodeur/Mattatall made their international debut at the 2006 Nebelhorn Trophy, where they placed 4th. They were 9th at the 2007 Canadian Championships.

In the 2007-08 season, Brodeur/Mattatall won the 2007 Ondrej Nepela Memorial and placed 7th at the 2008 Canadian Championships. Their placement at the event earned them a trip to the 2008 Four Continents, where they placed 7th.

Brodeur/Mattatal qualified for the 2009 World Championships and placed tenth. They announced their competitive retirement on March 25, 2011.

== Personal life ==
Brodeur married Nicholas Young in June 2010.

== Competitive highlights ==
=== Pair skating with Mattatall ===
Results
International
Event	2006–07	2007–08	2008–09	2009–10	2010–11
World Champ.			10th		
Four Continents Champ.		7th	8th	7th	
GP Bompard					4th
GP Cup of China			6th		
GP Cup of Russia				6th	
GP NHK Trophy				5th	6th
GP Skate Canada			4th		
Nebelhorn Trophy	4th				
Ondrej Nepela		1st			
National
Canadian Champ.	9th	7th	3rd	4th	4th
GP = Grand Prix

=== Singles career ===
International
Event	2003–04	2004–05	2005–06	2006–07	2007–08
JGP Slovakia			14th		
Triglav Trophy	12th J.				
National
Canadian Champ.	4th J.	10th	14th	8th	11th
JGP = Junior Grand Prix; Levels: N. = Novice; J. = Junior
