= John Mattatall =

Canadian pair skater

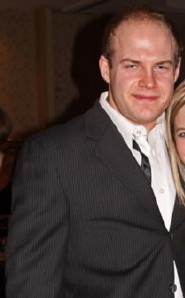

Personal information
- Full name: John Gordon Mattatall
- Born: December 1, 1982 (age 43) Tatamagouche, Nova Scotia
- Home town: Wallace, Nova Scotia
- Height: 1.73 m (5 ft 8 in)

Figure skating career
- Country: Canada
- Skating club: Tatamagouche FSC
- Retired: March 25, 2011

John Gordon Mattatall (born December 1, 1982) is a Canadian former pair skater. With Mylène Brodeur, he is the 2009 Canadian national bronze medalist and placed tenth at the 2009 World Championships.

== Skating career ==
As a single skater, Mattatall competed on the national level, competing many times at the Canadian Championships. Early in his pairs career, he competed with Lindsay Carruthers. They won the silver medal on the pre-novice level at the 2000 Canadian Championships. After that partnership ended, he competed with Renee Trembley on the novice level, placing 4th at the 2002 Canadian novice national championships.

From 2002 through 2005, Mattatall competed with Terra Findlay. They were the 2004 Canadian junior silver medalists and placed 10th at the 2004 Junior Worlds. They won a medal on the 2003–2004 ISU Junior Grand Prix. Findlay & Mattatall made their senior international at the 2004 Nebelhorn Trophy, where they placed 4th. They were coached by Doug Leigh and Lee Barkell at the Mariposa School of Skating.

In March 2006, Mattatall teamed up with Mylène Brodeur. They made their international debut at the 2006 Nebelhorn Trophy, placing 4th. They were 9th at the 2007 Canadian Championships. In the 2007-08 season, Brodeur/Mattatall won the 2007 Ondrej Nepela Memorial and placed 7th at the 2008 Canadian Championships. Their placement at the event earned them a trip to the 2008 Four Continents, where they placed 7th.

Brodeur/Mattatal qualified for the 2009 World Championships and placed tenth. They announced their competitive retirement on March 25, 2011.

== Post-skating life ==
Mattatall now works as a project engineer at K+S Windsor Salt in Pugwash, Nova Scotia. He still coaches part-time, and is quite involved in the skating community.

== Competitive highlights ==
=== Pairs with Brodeur ===
Results
International
Event	2006–07	2007–08	2008–09	2009–10	2010–11
World Champ.			10th		
Four Continents Champ.		7th	8th	7th	
GP Bompard					4th
GP Cup of China			6th		
GP Cup of Russia				6th	
GP NHK Trophy				5th	6th
GP Skate Canada			4th		
Nebelhorn Trophy	4th				
Ondrej Nepela		1st			
National
Canadian Champ.	9th	7th	3rd	4th	4th
GP = Grand Prix

=== Pairs with Findlay ===
International
Event	2002–03	2003–04	2004–05
Nebelhorn Trophy			4th
International: Junior
World Junior Championships		10th	
JGP Slovenia		3rd	
JGP Slovakia		4th	
National
Canadian Championships	4th J.	2nd J.	7th
J. = Junior level; JGP = Junior Grand Prix

=== Pairs with Trembley ===
Event	2000–2001
Canadian Championships	4th N.
N. = Novice level

=== Singles career ===
Event	1999–00	2002–03	2003–04	2004–05	2005–06
Canadian Championships	5th N.	25th	22nd	26th	19th
N. = Novice level
