= Guillaume Gfeller =

Canadian ice dancer

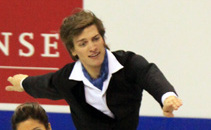
- Andrea Chong in 2009

Personal information
- Full name: Guillaume Gfeller
- Other names: Noone
- Born: April 27, 1985 (age 41) L'Annonciation, Quebec
- Home town: Nominingue, Quebec
- Height: 6 ft 3 in (1.91 m)

Figure skating career
- Country: Canada
- Partner: Andrea Chong
- Coach: Julie Marcotte
- Skating club: CPA Vallee De La Rouge

Guillaume Gfeller (born April 27, 1985, in L'Annonciation, Quebec) is a Canadian former competitive ice dancer. He competes with partner Andrea Chong, with whom he teamed up in 2007. They placed 4th at the 2009 Canadian Championships.

Gfeller had previously competed with Jordan McKenzie. He holds dual Canadian and Swiss citizenship.

== Programs ==
(with Chong)

Season	Original dance	Free dance
2009–2010	La Bohème by Charles Aznavour and Jacques Plante	Once Upon a Time in the West - The Devil by Ennio Morricone
2008–2009	Minnie the Moocher; Sing Sing Sing by Louis Prima	Les Feuilles Mortes; Hymne à l'amour by Pierre Porte
2007–2008	Love Me by Norah Jones; I'll Never Get Out of This World Alive by the White Willies	It's a Man’s World by Etta James

== Competitive highlights ==
=== With Chong ===
Event	2007–2008	2008–2009	2009–2010
Canadian Championships	9th	4th	7th
Skate Canada International		8th	8th
Nebelhorn Trophy		4th	

=== With McKenzie ===
Event	2004–2005	2005–2006
Canadian Championships	10th J.	7th J.
Junior Grand Prix, Bulgaria		10th
Junior Grand Prix, Serbia & Montenegro	13th	
J. = Junior level
