= 2007–08 ISU Grand Prix of Figure Skating =

- Type: Grand Prix
- Date: October 26 – December 16, 2007
- Season: 2007–08
- Previous: 2006–07 Grand Prix
- Next: 2008–09 Grand Prix

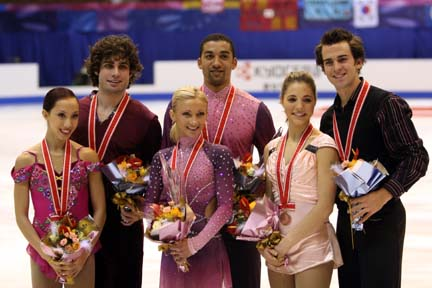
The pairs medalists at the 2007 NHK Trophy.

The 2007–08 ISU Grand Prix of Figure Skating was a series of international invitational competitions in the first half of the 2007–08 season. Skaters competed in the disciplines of men's singles, ladies singles, pairs, and ice dancing over six events. Skaters earned a certain number of points per placement and the top six scoring skaters or teams at the end of the series qualified for the 2007–08 Grand Prix of Figure Skating Final, held in Turin, Italy.

The Grand Prix series set the stage for the 2008 European Figure Skating Championships, the 2008 Four Continents Figure Skating Championships, the 2008 World Junior Figure Skating Championships, and the 2008 World Figure Skating Championships, as well as each country's national championships. The Grand Prix series began on October 25, 2007 and ended on December 16, 2007.

The Grand Prix is organized by the International Skating Union. Skaters compete for prize money and for a chance to compete in the Grand Prix Final. The corresponding series for Junior-level skaters was the 2007–08 ISU Junior Grand Prix.

== Qualifying ==
Skaters who reached the age of 14 by July 1, 2007 were eligible to compete on the senior Grand Prix circuit. The top six skaters/teams from the 2007 World Figure Skating Championships were seeded and were guaranteed two events. Skaters/teams who placed 7th through 12th were also given two events, though they were not considered seeded.

Skaters who medaled at the 2006–07 Junior Grand Prix Final or the 2007 World Junior Championships were guaranteed one event. Medaling at both guaranteed only one invitation.

The host country was allowed to send three skaters/teams of its choosing in each discipline. The remaining spots were filled from the top 75 skaters/teams in the 2006–07 Season's Best list. The International Skating Union published the list of invitations on June 8, 2007.

== Schedule ==
The series was composed of six events leading to the Grand Prix Final.

Date	Event	Location
October 26–28	2007 Skate America	Reading, Pennsylvania, United States
November 1–4	2007 Skate Canada International	Quebec City, Quebec, Canada
November 8–11	2007 Cup of China	Harbin, China
November 15–18	2007 Trophée Éric Bompard	Paris, France
November 22–25	2007 Cup of Russia	Moscow, Russia
Nov. 29 – Dec. 2	2007 NHK Trophy	Sendai, Japan
December 13–16	2007–08 Grand Prix Final	Turin, Italy

== Medal summary ==
Event	Date	Discipline	Gold	Silver	Bronze
(United States) Skate America	October 27	Pairs	(Canada) Jessica Dubé / Bryce Davison	(China) Pang Qing / Tong Jian	(Russia) Vera Bazarova / Yuri Larionov
(United States) Skate America	October 27	Men	(Japan) Daisuke Takahashi	(United States) Evan Lysacek	(Canada) Patrick Chan
(United States) Skate America	October 28	Ice dancing	(United States) Tanith Belbin / Benjamin Agosto	(France) Nathalie Péchalat / Fabian Bourzat	(Italy) Federica Faiella / Massimo Scali
(United States) Skate America	October 28	Ladies	(United States) Kimmie Meissner	(Japan) Miki Ando	(United States) Caroline Zhang

Event	Date	Discipline	Gold	Silver	Bronze
Skate Canada	November 3	Pairs	(Germany) Aliona Savchenko / Robin Szolkowy	(Canada) Jessica Dubé / Bryce Davison	(Russia) Yuko Kawaguchi / Alexander Smirnov
Skate Canada	November 3	Ladies	(Japan) Mao Asada	(Japan) Yukari Nakano	(Canada) Joannie Rochette
Skate Canada	November 4	Ice dancing	(Canada) Tessa Virtue / Scott Moir	(Italy) Anna Cappellini / Luca Lanotte	(France) Pernelle Carron / Mathieu Jost
Skate Canada	November 4	Men	(France) Brian Joubert	(Belgium) Kevin van der Perren	(Canada) Jeffrey Buttle

Event	Date	Discipline	Gold	Silver	Bronze
Cup of China	November 9	Pairs	(China) Pang Qing / Tong Jian	(United States) Keauna McLaughlin / Rockne Brubaker	(Canada) Jessica Miller / Ian Moram
Cup of China	November 10	Ladies	(South Korea) Kim Yuna	(United States) Caroline Zhang	(Italy) Carolina Kostner
Cup of China	November 10	Ice dancing	(United States) Tanith Belbin / Benjamin Agosto	(Russia) Oksana Domnina / Maxim Shabalin	(Italy) Federica Faiella / Massimo Scali
Cup of China	November 10	Men	(United States) Johnny Weir	(United States) Evan Lysacek	(Switzerland) Stéphane Lambiel

Event	Date	Discipline	Gold	Silver	Bronze
(France) Trophée Eric Bompard	November 17	Ice dancing	(France) Isabelle Delobel / Olivier Schoenfelder	(Russia) Jana Khokhlova / Sergei Novitski	(United States) Meryl Davis / Charlie White
(France) Trophée Eric Bompard	November 17	Men	(Canada) Patrick Chan	(Russia) Sergei Voronov	(France) Alban Préaubert
(France) Trophée Eric Bompard	November 17	Ladies	(Japan) Mao Asada	(United States) Kimmie Meissner	(United States) Ashley Wagner
(France) Trophée Eric Bompard	November 17	Pairs	(China) Zhang Dan / Zhang Hao	(China) Pang Qing / Tong Jian	(Russia) Maria Mukhortova / Maxim Trankov

Event	Date	Discipline	Gold	Silver	Bronze
Cup of Russia	November 24	Ladies	(South Korea) Kim Yuna	(Japan) Yukari Nakano	(Canada) Joannie Rochette
Cup of Russia	November 24	Pairs	(China) Zhang Dan / Zhang Hao	(Germany) Aliona Savchenko / Robin Szolkowy	(Russia) Yuko Kawaguchi / Alexander Smirnov
Cup of Russia	November 24	Men	(United States) Johnny Weir	(Switzerland) Stéphane Lambiel	(Russia) Andrei Griazev
Cup of Russia	November 25	Ice dancing	(Russia) Oksana Domnina / Maxim Shabalin	(France) Nathalie Péchalat / Fabian Bourzat	(Ukraine) Anna Zadorozhniuk / Sergei Verbillo

Event	Date	Discipline	Gold	Silver	Bronze
(Japan) NHK Trophy	November 30	Pairs	(Germany) Aliona Savchenko / Robin Szolkowy	(United States) Keauna McLaughlin / Rockne Brubaker	(Canada) Jessica Dubé / Bryce Davison
(Japan) NHK Trophy	December 1	Ice dancing	(France) Isabelle Delobel / Olivier Schoenfelder	(Canada) Tessa Virtue / Scott Moir	(Russia) Jana Khokhlova / Sergei Novitski
(Japan) NHK Trophy	December 1	Ladies	(Italy) Carolina Kostner	(Switzerland) Sarah Meier	(Japan) Nana Takeda
(Japan) NHK Trophy	December 2	Men	(Japan) Daisuke Takahashi	(Czech Republic) Tomáš Verner	(United States) Stephen Carriere

Event	Date	Discipline	Gold	Silver	Bronze
Grand Prix Final	December 15	Ice dancing	(Russia) Oksana Domnina / Maxim Shabalin	(United States) Tanith Belbin / Benjamin Agosto	(France) Isabelle Delobel / Olivier Schoenfelder
Grand Prix Final	December 15	Men	(Switzerland) Stéphane Lambiel	(Japan) Daisuke Takahashi	(United States) Evan Lysacek
Grand Prix Final	December 15	Pairs	(Germany) Aliona Savchenko / Robin Szolkowy	(China) Zhang Dan / Zhang Hao	(China) Pang Qing / Tong Jian
Grand Prix Final	December 15	Ladies	(South Korea) Kim Yuna	(Japan) Mao Asada	(Italy) Carolina Kostner

== Medal standings ==
Rank	Nation	Gold	Silver	Bronze	Total
1	United States	5	7	5	17
2	Japan	4	5	1	10
3	China	3	3	1	7
4	Canada	3	2	6	11
5	France	3	2	3	8
6	Germany	3	1	0	4
7	South Korea	3	0	0	3
8	Russia	2	3	6	11
9	Switzerland	1	2	1	4
10	Italy	1	1	4	6
11	Belgium	0	1	0	1
11	Czech Republic	0	1	0	1
13	Ukraine	0	0	1	1
Totals (13 entries)		28	28	28	84

== Points ==
After the final event, the NHK Trophy, the six skaters/teams with the most points advanced to the Grand Prix Final. The point system was as follows:

Placement	Points (Singles/Dance)	Points (Pairs)
1st Place	15 points	15 points
2nd Place	13 points	13 points
3rd Place	11 points	11 points
4th Place	9 points	9 points
5th Place	7 points	7 points
6th Place	5 points	5 points
7th Place	4 points	
8th Place	3 points	

If a pairs team competed in more than two events, the teams who scored below them in their non-scoring competition did not automatically move up in gaining points. For example, if Team A placed second below Team B, and it was Team B's non-scoring event, Team A still earned 13 points, not 15.

Skaters were required to compete in two events in order to qualify for the Final.

=== Final points ===
Skaters in bold qualified for the Grand Prix Final.

Points	Men	Ladies	Pairs	Ice dance
30	(Japan) **Daisuke Takahashi** (United States) **Johnny Weir**	(South Korea) **Kim Yuna** (Japan) **Mao Asada**	(China) **Zhang Dan / Zhang Hao**	(France) **Isabelle Delobel / Olivier Schoenfelder** (United States) **Tanith Belbin / Benjamin Agosto**
28		(United States) **Kimmie Meissner**	(Germany) **Aliona Savchenko / Robin Szolkowy** (Canada) **Jessica Dubé / Bryce Davison** (China) **Pang Qing / Tong Jian**	(Canada) **Tessa Virtue / Scott Moir** (Russia) **Oksana Domnina / Maxim Shabalin**
26	(Canada) **Patrick Chan** (United States) **Evan Lysacek**	(Italy) **Carolina Kostner** (Japan) **Yukari Nakano**	(United States) **Keauna McLaughlin / Rockne Brubaker**	(France) **Nathalie Péchalat / Fabian Bourzat**
24	(Switzerland) **Stéphane Lambiel**	(United States) **Caroline Zhang**		(Russia) **Jana Khokhlova / Sergei Novitski**
22	(Belgium) **Kevin van der Perren**	(Switzerland) Sarah Meier (Japan) Miki Ando (Canada) Joannie Rochette	(Russia) **Yuko Kawaguchi / Alexander Smirnov**	(Italy) Anna Cappellini / Luca Lanotte (Italy) Federica Faiella / Massimo Scali
20	(United States) Stephen Carriere (Canada) Jeffrey Buttle		(Russia) Maria Mukhortova / Maxim Trankov	(United States) Meryl Davis / Charlie White
19				
18	(Czech Republic) Tomáš Verner (France) Alban Préaubert	(United States) Ashley Wagner (United States) Emily Hughes		(France) Pernelle Carron / Mathieu Jost
17				
16		(Japan) Nana Takeda (Japan) Fumie Suguri	(Canada) Jessica Miller / Ian Moram (United States) Tiffany Vise / Derek Trent (Ukraine) Tatiana Volosozhar / Stanislav Morozov (Canada) Anabelle Langlois / Cody Hay	(Ukraine) Anna Zadorozhniuk / Sergei Verbillo (United Kingdom) Sinead Kerr / John Kerr (Russia) Ekaterina Bobrova / Dmitri Soloviev
15	(France) Brian Joubert (Russia) Andrei Griazev			
14	(Belarus) Sergei Davydov	(Canada) Mira Leung		(Azerbaijan) Kristin Fraser / Igor Lukanin
13	(Russia) Sergei Voronov			(Israel) Alexandra Zaretski / Roman Zaretski
12	(Canada) Christopher Mabee (United States) Jeremy Abbott (United States) Ryan Bradley		(China) Li Jiaqi / Xu Jiankun	
11	(Russia) Alexander Uspenski	(Finland) Laura Lepistö (Hungary) Júlia Sebestyén	(Russia) Vera Bazarova / Yuri Larionov	
10	(Japan) Takahiko Kozuka (France) Yannick Ponsero			(Armenia) Anastasia Grebenkina / Vazgen Azrojan (United States) Kimberly Navarro / Brent Bommentre
9		(Finland) Kiira Korpi	(United States) Amanda Evora / Mark Ladwig (China) Zhang Yue / Wang Lei	(Canada) Allie Hann-McCurdy / Michael Coreno (Canada) Kaitlyn Weaver / Andrew Poje
8		(Estonia) Jelena Glebova (Georgia (country)) Elene Gedevanishvili (United States) Beatrisa Liang		
7	(Canada) Vaughn Chipeur (Russia) Sergei Dobrin (Japan) Kensuke Nakaniwa		(Russia) Ksenia Krasilnikova / Konstantin Bezmaternikh (United States) Meeran Trombley / Laureano Ibarra	(Lithuania) Katherine Copely / Deividas Stagniūnas (Russia) Ekaterina Rubleva / Ivan Shefer (Germany) Nelli Zhiganshina / Alexander Gazsi
6				
5	(Italy) Karel Zelenka	(United States) Alissa Czisny (Russia) Nina Petushkova	(France) Adeline Canac / Maximin Coia (Italy) Laura Magitteri / Ondřej Hotárek (Canada) Meagan Duhamel / Craig Buntin (Estonia) Maria Sergejeva / Ilja Glebov	
4	(Russia) Andrei Lutai (Czech Republic) Pavel Kaška (Canada) Shawn Sawyer	(Canada) Lesley Hawker (China) Fang Dan (Hungary) Viktória Pavuk (Russia) Alexandra Ievleva		(China) Huang Xintong / Zheng Xun (Russia) Julia Zlobina / Alexei Sitnikov
3	(Canada) Kevin Reynolds (Switzerland) Jamal Othman	(Finland) Susanna Pöykiö (Japan) Mai Asada (France) Gwendoline Didier		(Japan) Chris Reed / Cathy Reed (France) Zoé Blanc / Pierre-Loup Bouquet (Austria) Barbora Silná / Dmitri Matsjuk (Germany) Carolina Hermann / Daniel Hermann

== Prize money ==
The total prize money is $180,000 per individual event and $272,000 for the Final. All amounts are in U.S. dollars. Pairs and dance teams split the money. The breakdown is as follows:

Placement	Prize money (series)	Prize money (Final)
1st	$18,000	$25,000
2nd	$13,000	$18,000
3rd	$9,000	$12,000
4th	$3,000	$6,000
5th	$2,000	$4,000
6th	-	$3,000
