= 2008–09 ISU Grand Prix of Figure Skating =

- Type: Grand Prix
- Date: October 23 – December 14, 2008
- Season: 2008–09
- Previous: 2007–08 Grand Prix
- Next: 2009–10 Grand Prix

The 2008–09 ISU Grand Prix of Figure Skating was a series of six international invitational competitions in the 2008–09 season. Skaters competed in the disciplines of men's singles, ladies singles, pair skating, and ice dancing on the senior level. At each event, skaters earned points based on their placements and the top six scoring skaters or teams at the end of the series qualified for the 2008–09 Grand Prix of Figure Skating Final, held in Goyang, South Korea.

The Grand Prix series set the stage for the 2009 European Figure Skating Championships, the 2009 Four Continents Figure Skating Championships, the 2009 World Junior Figure Skating Championships, and the 2009 World Figure Skating Championships, as well as each country's national championships. The Grand Prix series began on October 23, 2008 and ended on December 14, 2008.

The Grand Prix was organized by the International Skating Union. Skaters competed for prize money and a chance to compete in the Grand Prix Final. The corresponding series for Junior-level skaters was the 2008–09 ISU Junior Grand Prix.

== Qualifying ==
Skaters who reached the age of 14 by July 1, 2008 were eligible to compete on the senior Grand Prix circuit. The top six skaters from the 2008 World Championships were seeded and were guaranteed two events. Skaters who placed 7th through 12th were also given two events, though they were not considered seeded.

Skaters/teams who medaled at the 2007–08 Junior Grand Prix Final or the 2008 World Junior Championships were guaranteed one event. Skaters who medaled at both the Junior Grand Prix Final and the World Junior Championships were guaranteed only one event.

The host country was allowed to send three skaters/teams of their choosing in each discipline.

The spots remaining were filled from the top 75 skaters/teams in the 2007–08 Season's Best list.

== Schedule ==
| Date | Event | Location |
|---|---|---|
| October 23–26 | 2008 Skate America | Everett, Washington, United States |
| Oct. 31 – Nov. 2 | 2008 Skate Canada International | Ottawa, Ontario, Canada |
| November 6–9 | 2008 Cup of China | Beijing, China |
| November 13–16 | 2008 Trophée Éric Bompard | Paris, France |
| November 20–23 | 2008 Cup of Russia | Moscow, Russia |
| November 27–30 | 2008 NHK Trophy | Tokyo, Japan |
| December 10–14 | 2008–09 Grand Prix Final | Goyang, South Korea |

== Assignments ==
=== Men ===
| Nation | skater | Assignment(s) |
|---|---|---|
| Belarus | Sergei Davydov | ~~Skate America~~, ~~NHK Trophy~~ |
| Belgium | Kevin van der Perren | ~~Skate America~~, Cup of Russia |
| Canada | Jeffrey Buttle | ~~Skate Canada International~~, ~~Cup of China~~ |
| Canada | Patrick Chan | Skate Canada International, Trophée Éric Bompard |
| Canada | Vaughn Chipeur | Cup of China, Cup of Russia |
| Canada | Christopher Mabee | ~~Skate America~~, ~~NHK Trophy~~ |
| Canada | Ian Martinez | Skate America (added) |
| Canada | Kevin Reynolds | Skate America, NHK Trophy |
| Canada | Shawn Sawyer | Skate America, Skate Canada International (added) |
| Canada | Jeremy Ten | Skate Canada International (added), Cup of China (added) |
| China | Gao Song | Cup of China |
| China | Guan Jinlin | ~~Trophée Éric Bompard, NHK Trophy~~ |
| China | Li Chengjiang | ~~Skate America~~, Cup of Russia |
| China | Wu Jialiang | Cup of China, Trophée Éric Bompard (added) |
| China | Xu Min | Cup of China |
| Czech Republic | Tomas Verner | Cup of China, Cup of Russia |
| France | Yoann Deslot | Trophée Éric Bompard (added) |
| France | Brian Joubert | Trophée Éric Bompard, Cup of Russia |
| France | Kim Lucine | ~~Trophée Éric Bompard~~ |
| France | Yannick Ponsero | Skate Canada International, NHK Trophy |
| France | Alban Preaubert | Trophée Éric Bompard, Cup of Russia |
| Germany | Peter Liebers | Trophée Éric Bompard, NHK Trophy (added) |
| Italy | Karel Zelenka | ~~Skate Canada International~~ |
| Japan | Takahiko Kozuka | Skate America, Trophée Éric Bompard |
| Japan | Takahito Mura | NHK Trophy |
| Japan | Kensuke Nakaniwa | Cup of China |
| Japan | Yasuharu Nanri | Skate Canada International, NHK Trophy (added) |
| Japan | Nobunari Oda | NHK Trophy |
| Japan | Daisuke Takahashi | ~~Cup of China~~, ~~NHK Trophy~~ |
| Russia | Artem Borodulin | Cup of China, Cup of Russia |
| Russia | Andrei Griazev | ~~Skate America~~, ~~Trophée Éric Bompard~~ |
| Russia | Andrei Lutai | Trophée Éric Bompard (added), NHK Trophy |
| Russia | Alexander Uspenski | Cup of Russia |
| Russia | Vladimir Uspenski | Skate Canada International |
| Russia | Sergei Voronov | Skate Canada International, Cup of Russia |
| Slovakia | Igor Macypura | Skate America (added), Trophée Éric Bompard (added) |
| Slovenia | Gregor Urbas | Trophée Éric Bompard |
| Sweden | Kristoffer Berntsson | Cup of China, Cup of Russia |
| Sweden | Adrian Schultheiss | Skate America, NHK Trophy |
| Switzerland | Stephane Lambiel | ~~Skate Canada International~~, ~~Trophée Éric Bompard~~ |
| Switzerland | Jamal Othman | NHK Trophy (added) |
| Ukraine | Anton Kovalevski | Skate Canada International (added), NHK Trophy (added) |
| United States | Jeremy Abbott | Cup of China, Cup of Russia |
| United States | Ryan Bradley | Skate Canada International, Trophée Éric Bompard |
| United States | Stephen Carriere | Cup of China, NHK Trophy |
| United States | Evan Lysacek | Skate America, Skate Canada International |
| United States | Brandon Mroz | Skate Canada International, Trophée Éric Bompard |
| United States | Adam Rippon | Skate America, Cup of Russia |
| United States | Johnny Weir | Skate America, NHK Trophy |

== Medal summary ==
| Event | Date | Discipline | Gold | Silver | Bronze |
|---|---|---|---|---|---|
| (United States) Skate America | October 25 | Pairs | (Germany) Aliona Savchenko / Robin Szolkowy | (United States) Keauna McLaughlin / Rockne Brubaker | (Russia) Maria Mukhortova / Maxim Trankov |
| (United States) Skate America | October 25 | Men | (Japan) Takahiko Kozuka | (United States) Johnny Weir | (United States) Evan Lysacek |
| (United States) Skate America | October 26 | Ice dancing | (France) Isabelle Delobel / Olivier Schoenfelder | (United States) Tanith Belbin / Benjamin Agosto | (United Kingdom) Sinead Kerr / John Kerr |
| (United States) Skate America | October 26 | Ladies | (South Korea) Kim Yuna | (Japan) Yukari Nakano | (Japan) Miki Ando |

| Event | Date | Discipline | Gold | Silver | Bronze |
|---|---|---|---|---|---|
| Skate Canada | November 1 | Pairs | (Russia) Yuko Kawaguchi / Alexander Smirnov | (Canada) Jessica Dubé / Bryce Davison | (United States) Keauna McLaughlin / Rockne Brubaker |
| Skate Canada | November 1 | Men | (Canada) Patrick Chan | (United States) Ryan Bradley | (United States) Evan Lysacek |
| Skate Canada | November 1 | Ladies | (Canada) Joannie Rochette | (Japan) Fumie Suguri | (United States) Alissa Czisny |
| Skate Canada | November 2 | Ice dancing | (United States) Meryl Davis / Charlie White | (Canada) Vanessa Crone / Paul Poirier | (France) Nathalie Péchalat / Fabian Bourzat |

| Event | Date | Discipline | Gold | Silver | Bronze |
|---|---|---|---|---|---|
| Cup of China | November 7 | Pairs | (China) Zhang Dan / Zhang Hao | (Ukraine) Tatiana Volosozhar / Stanislav Morozov | (China) Pang Qing / Tong Jian |
| Cup of China | November 8 | Ladies | (South Korea) Kim Yuna | (Japan) Miki Ando | (Finland) Laura Lepistö |
| Cup of China | November 8 | Ice dancing | (Russia) Oksana Domnina / Maxim Shabalin | (United States) Tanith Belbin / Benjamin Agosto | (Russia) Jana Khokhlova / Sergei Novitski |
| Cup of China | November 8 | Men | (United States) Jeremy Abbott | (United States) Stephen Carriere | (Czech Republic) Tomáš Verner |

| Event | Date | Discipline | Gold | Silver | Bronze |
|---|---|---|---|---|---|
| (France) Trophée Eric Bompard | November 15 | Men | (Canada) Patrick Chan | (Japan) Takahiko Kozuka | (France) Alban Préaubert |
| (France) Trophée Eric Bompard | November 15 | Pairs | (Germany) Aliona Savchenko / Robin Szolkowy | (Russia) Maria Mukhortova / Maxim Trankov | (Canada) Meagan Duhamel / Craig Buntin |
| (France) Trophée Eric Bompard | November 15 | Ladies | (Canada) Joannie Rochette | (Japan) Mao Asada | (United States) Caroline Zhang |
| (France) Trophée Eric Bompard | November 15 | Ice dancing | (France) Isabelle Delobel / Olivier Schoenfelder | (Italy) Federica Faiella / Massimo Scali | (United Kingdom) Sinead Kerr / John Kerr |

| Event | Date | Discipline | Gold | Silver | Bronze |
|---|---|---|---|---|---|
| Cup of Russia | November 22 | Ladies | (Italy) Carolina Kostner | (United States) Rachael Flatt | (Japan) Fumie Suguri |
| Cup of Russia | November 22 | Pairs | (China) Zhang Dan / Zhang Hao | (Russia) Yuko Kawaguchi / Alexander Smirnov | (Ukraine) Tatiana Volosozhar / Stanislav Morozov |
| Cup of Russia | November 22 | Men | (France) Brian Joubert | (Czech Republic) Tomáš Verner | (France) Alban Préaubert |
| Cup of Russia | November 23 | Ice dancing | (Russia) Jana Khokhlova / Sergei Novitski | (Russia) Oksana Domnina / Maxim Shabalin | (United States) Meryl Davis / Charlie White |

| Event | Date | Discipline | Gold | Silver | Bronze |
|---|---|---|---|---|---|
| (Japan) NHK Trophy | November 29 | Pairs | (China) Pang Qing / Tong Jian | (United States) Rena Inoue / John Baldwin | (Canada) Jessica Dubé / Bryce Davison |
| (Japan) NHK Trophy | November 29 | Ice dancing | (Italy) Federica Faiella / Massimo Scali | (France) Nathalie Péchalat / Fabian Bourzat | (United States) Emily Samuelson / Evan Bates |
| (Japan) NHK Trophy | November 29 | Ladies | (Japan) Mao Asada | (Japan) Akiko Suzuki | (Japan) Yukari Nakano |
| (Japan) NHK Trophy | November 30 | Men | (Japan) Nobunari Oda | (United States) Johnny Weir | (France) Yannick Ponsero |

| Event | Date | Discipline | Gold | Silver | Bronze |
|---|---|---|---|---|---|
| Grand Prix Final ( (South Korea) ) | December 13 | Ice dancing | (France) Isabelle Delobel / Olivier Schoenfelder | (Russia) Oksana Domnina / Maxim Shabalin | (United States) Meryl Davis / Charlie White |
| Grand Prix Final ( (South Korea) ) | December 13 | Men | (United States) Jeremy Abbott | (Japan) Takahiko Kozuka | (United States) Johnny Weir |
| Grand Prix Final ( (South Korea) ) | December 13 | Ladies | (Japan) Mao Asada | (South Korea) Kim Yuna | (Italy) Carolina Kostner |
| Grand Prix Final ( (South Korea) ) | December 13 | Pairs | (China) Pang Qing / Tong Jian | (China) Zhang Dan / Zhang Hao | (Germany) Aliona Savchenko / Robin Szolkowy |

== Points ==
After the final event, the 2008 NHK Trophy, the six skaters/teams with the most points advanced to the Grand Prix Final. The qualification point system is as follows:

| Placement | Points (Singles/Dance) | Points (Pairs) |
|---|---|---|
| 1st Place | 15 Points | 15 Points |
| 2nd Place | 13 Points | 13 Points |
| 3rd Place | 11 Points | 11 Points |
| 4th Place | 9 Points | 9 Points |
| 5th Place | 7 Points | 7 Points |
| 6th Place | 5 Points | 5 Points |
| 7th Place | 4 Points | |
| 8th Place | 3 Points | |

There were seven tie-breakers in cases of a tie in overall points:

1. Highest placement at an event. If a skater placed 1st and 3rd, the tiebreaker is the 1st place, and that beats a skater who placed 2nd in both events.
2. Highest combined total scores in both events. If a skater earned 200 points at one event and 250 at a second, that skater would win in the second tie-break over a skater who earned 200 points at one event and 150 at another.
3. Participated in two events.
4. Highest combined scores in the free skating/free dancing portion of both events.
5. Highest individual score in the free skating/free dancing portion from one event.
6. Highest combined scores in the short program/original dance of both events.
7. Highest number of total participants at the events.

If a tie remained, it was considered unbreakable and the tied skaters all qualified for the Grand Prix Final.

=== Final points ===
Skaters in bold qualified for the Grand Prix Final.

| Points | Men | Ladies | Pairs | Ice dance |
|---|---|---|---|---|
| 30 | (Canada) **Patrick Chan** | (South Korea) **Kim Yuna** (Canada) **Joannie Rochette** | (Germany) **Aliona Savchenko / Robin Szolkowy** (China) **Zhang Dan / Zhang Hao** | (France) **Isabelle Delobel / Olivier Schoenfelder** |
| 28 | (Japan) **Takahiko Kozuka** | (Japan) **Mao Asada** | (Russia) **Yuko Kawaguchi / Alexander Smirnov** | (Russia) **Oksana Domnina / Maxim Shabalin** (Italy) **Federica Faiella / Massimo Scali** |
| 26 | (United States) **Johnny Weir** | | (China) **Pang Qing / Tong Jian** | (Russia) **Jana Khokhlova / Sergei Novitski** (United States) **Meryl Davis / Charlie White** (United States) **Tanith Belbin / Benjamin Agosto** |
| 24 | (France) **Brian Joubert** (United States) **Jeremy Abbott** (Czech Republic) **Tomáš Verner** | (Italy) **Carolina Kostner** (Japan) **Yukari Nakano** (Japan) **Miki Ando** (Japan) Fumie Suguri | (Ukraine) **Tatiana Volosozhar / Stanislav Morozov** (Russia) **Maria Mukhortova / Maxim Trankov** (United States) Keauna McLaughlin / Rockne Brubaker (Canada) Jessica Dubé / Bryce Davison | (France) Nathalie Péchalat / Fabian Bourzat |
| 22 | (France) Alban Préaubert (United States) Evan Lysacek | (United States) Rachael Flatt | | (Canada) Vanessa Crone / Paul Poirier (United Kingdom) Sinead Kerr / John Kerr |
| 20 | (France) Yannick Ponsero | (United States) Alissa Czisny | (United States) Rena Inoue / John Baldwin (Canada) Meagan Duhamel / Craig Buntin | (United States) Emily Samuelson / Evan Bates |
| 19 | | | | |
| 18 | (United States) Stephen Carriere (Canada) Kevin Reynolds | (Finland) Laura Lepistö (United States) Caroline Zhang (United States) Ashley Wagner | | (Italy) Anna Cappellini / Luca Lanotte |
| 17 | (United States) Ryan Bradley | | | |
| 16 | | | | (Russia) Kristina Gorshkova / Vitali Butikov |
| 15 | (Japan) Nobunari Oda | | | |
| 14 | (Canada) Shawn Sawyer | | (Canada) Mylène Brodeur / John Mattatall (United States) Tiffany Vise / Derek Trent | (Russia) Ekaterina Bobrova / Dmitri Soloviev (France) Pernelle Carron / Mathieu Jost |
| 13 | | (Japan) Akiko Suzuki | | |
| 12 | | (Finland) Susanna Pöykiö (United States) Beatrisa Liang | | (United States) Kimberly Navarro / Brent Bommentre |
| 11 | (United States) Brandon Mroz | (Russia) Alena Leonova | | (Israel) Alexandra Zaretski / Roman Zaretski |
| 10 | (United States) Adam Rippon | (United States) Mirai Nagasu | | (Ukraine) Anna Zadorozhniuk / Sergei Verbillo |
| 9 | (Russia) Artem Borodulin (Russia) Sergei Voronov | (France) Candice Didier | (United States) Amanda Evora / Mark Ladwig (China) Dong Huibo / Wu Yiming (Russia) Lubov Iliushechkina / Nodari Maisuradze (United Kingdom) Stacey Kemp / David King | (Russia) Ekaterina Rubleva / Ivan Shefer (Canada) Kaitlyn Weaver / Andrew Poje |
| 8 | (China) Wu Jialiang (Sweden) Adrian Schultheiss | (United States) Katrina Hacker | | (Lithuania) Katherine Copely / Deividas Stagniūnas |
| 7 | (Canada) Vaughn Chipeur (Japan) Takahito Mura | (Canada) Cynthia Phaneuf | (China) Zhang Yue / Wang Lei (Russia) Ksenia Ozerova / Alexander Enbert (Estonia) Maria Sergejeva / Ilja Glebov | (United States) Jennifer Wester / Daniil Barantsev |
| 6 | (Sweden) Kristoffer Berntsson (Japan) Yasuharu Nanri | (United States) Kimmie Meissner | | |
| 5 | (Russia) Alexander Uspenski (Germany) Peter Liebers (Belgium) Kevin van der Perren | (Estonia) Jelena Glebova (China) Xu Binshu (Switzerland) Sarah Meier | (France) Adeline Canac / Maximin Coia (Canada) Monica Pisotta / Michael Stewart (United States) Caitlin Yankowskas / John Coughlin (Canada) Rachel Kirkland / Eric Radford (Italy) Laura Magitteri / Ondřej Hotárek | (Azerbaijan) Kristin Fraser / Igor Lukanin |
| 4 | (Canada) Jeremy Ten | (Canada) Mira Leung (United Kingdom) Jenna McCorkell (Hungary) Júlia Sebestyén (Georgia (country)) Elene Gedevanishvili | | (United States) Jane Summersett / Todd Gilles (Russia) Anastasia Platonova / Alexander Grachev |
| 3 | | (Uzbekistan) Anastasia Gimazetdinova | | (China) Yu Xiaoyang / Wang Chen (Canada) Andrea Chong / Guillame Gfeller (Japan) Cathy Reed / Chris Reed |

== Prize money ==
The total prize money was $180,000 per event in the series and $272,000 for the Final. All amounts are in U.S. dollars. Pairs and dance teams split the money. The breakdown was as follows:

| Placement | Prize money (series) | Prize money (final) |
|---|---|---|
| 1st | $18,000 | $25,000 |
| 2nd | $13,000 | $18,000 |
| 3rd | $9,000 | $12,000 |
| 4th | $3,000 | $6,000 |
| 5th | $2,000 | $4,000 |
| 6th | - | $3,000 |
