= Petushkov =

Petushkov (Russian: Петушков) is a Russian masculine surname originating from the word petushok (little rooster); its feminine counterpart is Petushkova. It may refer to

- Nina Petushkova (born 1992), Russian figure skater
- Roman Petushkov (born 1978), Russian cross-country skier, biathlete and Paralympian
- Yelena Petushkova (1940–2007), Russian equestrian
