= 2007 Cup of Russia =

ISU Grand Prix of Figure Skating event

- Type: Grand Prix
- Date: November 22 – 25
- Season: 2007–08
- Location: Moscow
- Host: Figure Skating Federation of Russia
- Venue: Sports Palace Megasport

Champions
- Men's singles: (United States) Johnny Weir
- Ladies' singles: (South Korea) Kim Yuna
- Pairs: (China) Zhang Dan / Zhang Hao
- Ice dance: (Russia) Oksana Domnina / Maxim Shabalin
- Previous: 2006 Cup of Russia
- Next: 2008 Cup of Russia
- Previous Grand Prix: 2007 Trophée Éric Bompard
- Next Grand Prix: 2007 NHK Trophy

The 2007 Cup of Russia was the fifth event of six in the 2007–08 ISU Grand Prix of Figure Skating, a senior-level international invitational competition series. It was held at the Sports Palace Megasport in Moscow on November 22–25. Medals were awarded in the disciplines of men's singles, ladies' singles, pair skating, and ice dancing. Skaters earned points toward qualifying for the 2007–08 Grand Prix Final. The compulsory dance was the Yankee Polka.

== Results ==
=== Men ===
Rank	Name	Nation	Total points	SP		FS	
1	Johnny Weir	United States	229.96	2	80.15	1	149.81
2	Stéphane Lambiel	Switzerland	218.84	1	80.49	2	138.35
3	Andrei Griazev	Russia	206.13	3	70.95	5	135.18
4	Jeffrey Buttle	Canada	201.77	6	65.16	3	136.61
5	Takahiko Kozuka	Japan	199.98	7	64.65	4	135.33
6	Yannick Ponsero	France	189.76	4	67.93	9	121.83
7	Alexander Uspenski	Russia	189.17	8	63.74	7	125.43
8	Kevin Reynolds	Canada	186.69	11	59.46	6	127.23
9	Andrei Lutai	Russia	185.35	5	65.55	10	119.80
10	Kristoffer Berntsson	Sweden	182.46	10	60.08	8	122.38
11	Xu Ming	China	159.01	12	55.99	11	103.02
12	Gregor Urbas	Slovenia	155.62	9	62.90	12	92.72

=== Ladies ===
Kim Yuna set a world record for the free skating score for a lady under Code of Points (133.70).

Rank	Name	Nation	Total points	SP		FS	
1	Kim Yuna	South Korea	197.20	1	63.50	1	133.70
2	Yukari Nakano	Japan	172.77	2	60.50	3	112.27
3	Joannie Rochette	Canada	169.91	5	50.56	2	119.35
4	Kiira Korpi	Finland	154.26	3	58.22	4	96.04
5	Fumie Suguri	Japan	148.15	4	56.18	6	91.97
6	Nina Petushkova	Russia	138.79	9	44.70	5	94.09
7	Júlia Sebestyén	Hungary	134.98	8	44.76	7	90.22
8	Beatrisa Liang	United States	134.60	7	46.30	8	88.30
9	Liu Yan	China	126.14	10	38.40	9	87.74
10	Katarina Gerboldt	Russia	121.10	6	48.02	10	73.08
11	Kristin Wieczorek	Germany	109.61	11	37.38	11	72.23
12	Arina Martinova	Russia	101.43	12	34.48	12	66.95

=== Pairs ===
Rank	Name	Nation	Total points	SP		FS	
1	Zhang Dan / Zhang Hao	China	192.68	1	69.96	1	122.72
2	Aliona Savchenko / Robin Szolkowy	Germany	185.95	2	66.78	2	119.17
3	Yuko Kawaguchi / Alexander Smirnov	Russia	181.71	4	62.94	3	118.77
4	Maria Mukhortova / Maxim Trankov	Russia	179.82	3	63.10	4	116.72
5	Ksenia Krasilnikova / Konstantin Bezmaternikh	Russia	149.44	5	53.96	5	95.48
6	Adeline Canac / Maximin Coia	France	132.25	6	46.82	6	85.43
7	Maria Sergejeva / Ilja Glebov	Estonia	130.21	7	45.40	7	84.81
8	Laura Magitteri / Ondřej Hotárek	Italy	121.54	8	40.48	8	81.06

=== Ice dancing ===
Rank	Name	Nation	Total points	CD		OD		FD	
1	Oksana Domnina / Maxim Shabalin	Russia	205.24	1	40.05	1	63.20	1	101.99
2	Nathalie Péchalat / Fabian Bourzat	France	184.38	2	34.87	2	58.03	2	91.48
3	Anna Zadorozhniuk / Sergei Verbillo	Ukraine	161.64	5	29.28	5	50.76	4	81.60
4	Ekaterina Bobrova / Dmitri Soloviev	Russia	161.51	3	30.22	3	52.44	6	78.85
5	Katherine Copely / Deividas Stagniūnas	Lithuania	161.36	6	27.68	4	50.83	3	82.85
6	Anastasia Grebenkina / Vazgen Azrojan	Armenia	160.72	4	30.04	6	49.33	5	81.35
7	Ekaterina Rubleva / Ivan Shefer	Russia	151.13	8	26.70	7	47.70	7	76.73
8	Nelli Zhiganshina / Alexander Gazsi	Germany	143.69	7	27.08	8	45.73	9	70.88
9	Kamila Hájková / David Vincour	Czech Republic	139.14	9	23.35	9	44.50	8	71.29
10	Lynn Kriengkrairut / Logan Giulietti-Schmitt	United States	131.82	10	22.03	10	41.30	10	68.49
