= Nana Takeda =

Japanese figure skater

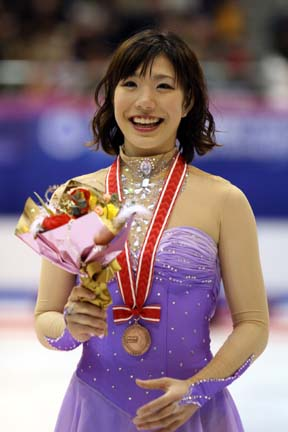
- Takeda at the 2007 NHK Trophy

Personal information
- Born: 21 December 1988 (age 37) Tokyo, Japan
- Height: 1.67 m (5 ft 5 1/2 in)

Figure skating career
- Country: Japan
- Coach: Koji Okajima; Hanae Yokoya
- Skating club: Meiji Jingu Gaien Tokyo
- Began skating: 1993
- Retired: 2011

Nana Takeda (武田 奈也, Takeda Nana; born 21 December 1988) is a Japanese former figure skater. She is the 2007 NHK Trophy bronze medalist and 2009 Winter Universiade silver medalist. She won five medals on the ISU Junior Grand Prix series and placed as high as fourth at the World Junior Championships. She now works as a coach.

== Career ==
Takeda started figure skating at age 5 after seeing Yuka Sato performing on television.

She began training with coach Koji Okajima when she was nine. As a junior, Takeda placed 4th at the 2006 World Junior Championships and won the 2006–07 Japan Junior Championships.

She moved up to the senior level in 2007 and received two 2007 Grand Prix series assignments. At her first event, Skate Canada International, she finished in 6th place. At her second assignment, the NHK Trophy, she placed 5th in the short program and rose to win bronze after the free skate, where despite falling on a triple flip jump, she landed a jump combination toward the end of her program. She placed 6th at the Japan Championships.

The next season, she competed at one Grand Prix assignment, 2008 Skate Canada International, where she placed 9th after having injured her right ankle one week before the event. She withdrew from her second planned Grand Prix event. Takeda again finished 6th at the national championships. She competed at the 2009 Winter Universiade, where she was the flagbearer for the opening ceremony, and won the silver medal.

In the 2009–2010 season, she finished 13th at her first event, the Finlandia Trophy. She was initially assigned to compete at the 2009 NHK Trophy. However, she did not end up competing there. She placed 9th at the Japan Championships, her last major competition. She announced her retirement in late 2011.

As a skater, she was recognized for her expressive energy and smiles.

== Post-competitive career ==
Takeda enrolled in Waseda University.

After retiring from competition, she became a coach, first in the Kantō region. In 2020, after having a son, she moved to Tomakomai, Hokkaido with her husband. Initially, she intended to focus on raising her son; however, two of her students also moved to the area, and she started a new club and continued to coach. She also choreographs programs.

== Personal life ==
Takeda married Kotaro Yamada, a hockey player. They have two children.

== Programs ==
Season	Short program	Free skating	Exhibition
2008–2009	Artistry in Rhythm by Stan Kenton	Swan Lake by Pyotr Tchaikovsky	High School Musical
2007–2008	Tanguera by Mariano Mores	Otonal by Raúl Di Blasio	
2006–2007	Midnight Garden (Swan Lake modern arrangement) by Bond	Tango Jalousie by Jacob Gade; Tango de los Exilados performed by Vanessa-Mae	
2005–2006	Midnight Garden (Swan Lake modern arrangement) by Bond	Otonal by Raúl Di Blasio	
2004–2005	Libertango by Astor Piazzolla	The Last Emperor by Ryuichi Sakamoto	

== Competitive highlights ==
GP: Grand Prix; JGP: Junior Grand Prix

International
Event	00–01	01–02	02–03	03–04	04–05	05–06	06–07	07–08	08–09	09–10	10–11
GP NHK Trophy								3rd			
GP Skate Canada								6th	9th		
Finlandia										13th	
Universiade									2nd		
International: Junior
Junior Worlds						4th	9th				
JGP Final					8th		5th				
JGP Bulgaria				6th							
JGP China					1st						
JGP Croatia						2nd					
JGP Estonia						4th					
JGP Romania					2nd		1st				
JGP Slovakia			17th								
JGP Taiwan							2nd				
Mladost Trophy				1st J.							
National
Japan Champ.				10th		9th	7th	6th	6th	9th	WD
Japan Junior	13th	9th	8th	5th	7th	2nd	1st				
J. = Junior level; WD = Withdrew
