= 2007 Skate Canada International =

- Type: Grand Prix
- Date: November 1 – 4
- Season: 2007–08
- Location: Quebec City, Quebec
- Venue: Colisée Pepsi

Champions
- Men's singles: (France) Brian Joubert
- Ladies' singles: (Japan) Mao Asada
- Pairs: (Germany) Aliona Savchenko / Robin Szolkowy
- Ice dance: (Canada) Tessa Virtue / Scott Moir
- Previous: 2006 Skate Canada International
- Next: 2008 Skate Canada International
- Previous Grand Prix: 2007 Skate America
- Next Grand Prix: 2007 Cup of China

The 2007 Skate Canada International was the second event of six in the 2007–08 ISU Grand Prix of Figure Skating, a senior-level international invitational competition series. It was held at the Colisée Pepsi in Quebec City, Quebec on November 1–4. Medals were awarded in the disciplines of men's singles, ladies' singles, pair skating, and ice dancing. Skaters earned points toward qualifying for the 2007–08 Grand Prix Final.

== Results ==
=== Men ===
France's Brian Joubert won the men's title ahead of Belgium's Kevin van der Perren. Jeffrey Buttle of Canada took the bronze.

Rank	Name	Nation	Total points	SP		FS	
1	Brian Joubert	France	213.62	1	78.05	2	135.57
2	Kevin van der Perren	Belgium	202.55	5	66.11	1	136.44
3	Jeffrey Buttle	Canada	198.77	3	66.85	3	131.92
4	Christopher Mabee	Canada	192.20	4	66.50	5	125.70
5	Vaughn Chipeur	Canada	187.41	6	65.65	6	121.76
6	Yannick Ponsero	France	178.18	2	67.09	10	111.09
7	Pavel Kaška	Czech Republic	172.90	7	57.43	8	115.47
8	Jeremy Abbott	United States	171.06	11	44.75	4	126.31
9	Scott Smith	United States	169.97	8	56.09	9	113.88
10	Jamal Othman	Switzerland	166.96	9	51.11	7	115.85
11	Wu Jialiang	China	153.45	10	47.51	11	105.94
12	Geoffry Varner	United States	134.54	12	42.45	12	92.09

=== Ladies ===
Mao Asada of Japan won the ladies' title ahead of her compatriot Yukari Nakano and Canada's Joannie Rochette. Nakano landed a triple axel in her free skating.

Rank	Name	Nation	Total points	SP		FS	
1	Mao Asada	Japan	177.66	3	58.08	1	119.58
2	Yukari Nakano	Japan	169.43	4	55.94	2	113.49
3	Joannie Rochette	Canada	168.18	5	55.48	3	112.70
4	Emily Hughes	United States	162.42	2	58.72	4	103.70
5	Ashley Wagner	United States	150.06	8	50.86	5	99.20
6	Nana Takeda	Japan	148.05	6	52.02	6	96.03
7	Laura Lepistö	Finland	147.69	1	59.18	9	88.51
8	Jelena Glebova	Estonia	145.69	7	51.36	7	94.33
9	Lesley Hawker	Canada	136.55	9	46.96	8	89.59
10	Cynthia Phaneuf	Canada	129.17	10	46.02	10	83.15
11	Alisa Drei	Finland	123.90	11	44.96	12	78.94
12	Idora Hegel	Croatia	120.32	12	40.38	11	79.94

=== Pairs ===
Germany's Aliona Savchenko / Robin Szolkowy won the pairs' title. Russia's Yuko Kawaguchi / Alexander Smirnov attempted a throw quadruple salchow jump in their free skating. They were credited with the rotation, but she fell on the landing, so it was not completed successfully.

Rank	Name	Nation	Total points	SP		FS	
1	Aliona Savchenko / Robin Szolkowy	Germany	188.63	1	69.44	1	119.19
2	Jessica Dubé / Bryce Davison	Canada	174.20	2	63.12	2	111.08
3	Yuko Kawaguchi / Alexander Smirnov	Russia	165.19	3	60.00	3	105.19
4	Anabelle Langlois / Cody Hay	Canada	156.67	4	53.98	4	102.69
5	Tiffany Vise / Derek Trent	United States	147.52	6	51.26	5	96.26
6	Meagan Duhamel / Craig Buntin	Canada	144.16	5	52.78	6	91.38

=== Ice dancing ===
Canada's Tessa Virtue / Scott Moir won gold in ice dancing. Melissa Gregory / Denis Petukhov of the United States withdrew before the free dance due to an accident; he lost his footing and dropped her on her chest while performing a one-handed rotational lift during the six-minute warmup, and skidded into the boards himself. Gregory was rushed to a hospital on a stretcher but released later that night. They missed the rest of the competitive season while recovering from their injuries. The compulsory dance was the Yankee Polka.

Hann-McCurdy and Coreno were substitutes, replacing a team which withdrew before the start of the event.

Rank	Name	Nation	Total points	CD		OD		FD	
1	Tessa Virtue / Scott Moir	Canada	197.07	1	36.25	1	61.20	1	99.62
2	Anna Cappellini / Luca Lanotte	Italy	171.57	2	32.23	2	53.90	3	85.44
3	Pernelle Carron / Mathieu Jost	France	167.83	4	28.27	3	52.43	2	87.13
4	Allie Hann-McCurdy / Michael Coreno	Canada	152.16	7	25.51	6	47.75	4	78.90
5	Ekaterina Bobrova / Dmitri Soloviev	Russia	151.97	6	25.72	4	49.53	6	76.72
6	Kaitlyn Weaver / Andrew Poje	Canada	148.77	8	25.07	8	45.74	5	77.96
7	Nelli Zhiganshina / Alexander Gazsi	Germany	140.64	9	24.44	7	46.58	8	69.62
8	Carolina Hermann / Daniel Hermann	Germany	136.11	10	22.46	9	43.00	7	70.65
9	Julia Zlobina / Alexei Sitnikov	Russia	132.05	5	26.75	10	36.39	9	68.91
WD	Melissa Gregory / Denis Petukhov	United States		3	32.03	5	47.80		
