= 2007 NHK Trophy =

- Type: Grand Prix
- Date: November 28 – December 2
- Season: 2007–08
- Location: Sendai
- Venue: Sendai City Gymnasium

Champions
- Men's singles: (Japan) Daisuke Takahashi
- Ladies' singles: (Italy) Carolina Kostner
- Pairs: (Germany) Aliona Savchenko / Robin Szolkowy
- Ice dance: (France) Isabelle Delobel / Olivier Schoenfelder
- Previous: 2006 NHK Trophy
- Next: 2008 NHK Trophy
- Previous Grand Prix: 2007 Cup of Russia
- Next Grand Prix: 2007–08 Grand Prix Final

The 2007 NHK Trophy was the final event of six in the 2007–08 ISU Grand Prix of Figure Skating, a senior-level international invitational competition series. It was held at the Sendai City Gymnasium in Sendai on November 28 – December 2. Medals were awarded in the disciplines of men's singles, ladies' singles, pair skating, and ice dancing. Skaters earned points toward qualifying for the 2007–08 Grand Prix Final.

== Results ==
=== Men ===
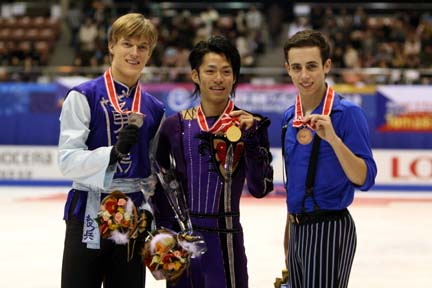
The men's podium. From left: Tomáš Verner (2nd), Daisuke Takahashi (1st), Stephen Carriere (3rd).

Rank	Name	Nation	Total points	SP		FS	
1	Daisuke Takahashi	Japan	234.22	2	77.89	1	156.33
2	Tomáš Verner	Czech Republic	229.45	1	78.15	2	151.30
3	Stephen Carriere	United States	204.98	3	67.85	3	137.13
4	Jeremy Abbott	United States	187.56	12	58.27	4	129.29
5	Sergei Dobrin	Russia	186.53	6	66.14	6	120.39
6	Sergei Davydov	Belarus	184.70	5	66.25	7	118.45
7	Andrei Griazev	Russia	182.83	11	62.05	5	120.78
8	Kensuke Nakaniwa	Japan	180.70	7	63.70	9	117.00
9	Shawn Sawyer	Canada	180.35	9	62.85	8	117.50
10	Yasuharu Nanri	Japan	176.25	4	67.55	11	108.70
11	Vaughn Chipeur	Canada	173.65	10	62.10	10	111.55
12	Li Chengjiang	China	162.77	8	63.56	12	99.21

=== Ladies ===
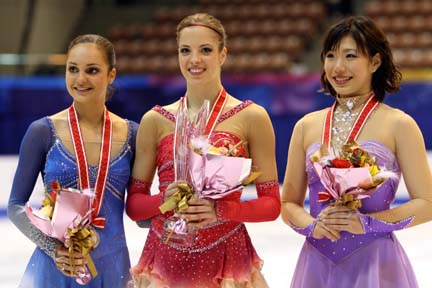
The ladies' podium. From left: Sarah Meier (2nd), Carolina Kostner (1st), Nana Takeda (3rd).

Rank	Name	Nation	Total points	SP		FS	
1	Carolina Kostner	Italy	164.69	1	61.24	2	103.45
2	Sarah Meier	Switzerland	163.17	3	59.16	1	104.01
3	Nana Takeda	Japan	154.83	5	55.06	3	99.77
4	Miki Ando	Japan	145.81	2	60.52	7	85.29
5	Laura Lepistö	Finland	145.58	6	54.48	5	91.10
6	Alissa Czisny	United States	144.32	4	58.24	6	86.08
7	Lesley Hawker	Canada	139.96	9	45.94	4	94.02
8	Elene Gedevanishvili	Georgia	136.54	7	53.82	8	82.72
9	Kim Chae-hwa	South Korea	122.76	10	45.32	9	77.44
10	Liu Yan	China	119.66	8	48.42	10	71.24
WD	Mai Asada	Japan		11	35.98		

=== Pairs ===
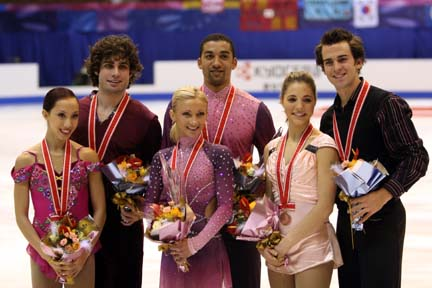
The pairs podium. From left: Keauna McLaughlin / Rockne Brubaker (2nd), Aliona Savchenko / Robin Szolkowy (1st), Jessica Dubé / Bryce Davison (3rd).

Rank	Name	Nation	Total points	SP		FS	
1	Aliona Savchenko / Robin Szolkowy	Germany	190.64	1	70.32	1	120.32
2	Keauna McLaughlin / Rockne Brubaker	United States	166.48	4	55.66	2	110.82
3	Jessica Dubé / Bryce Davison	Canada	160.21	3	58.16	3	102.05
4	Tatiana Volosozhar / Stanislav Morozov	Ukraine	150.81	2	60.14	5	90.67
5	Anabelle Langlois / Cody Hay	Canada	145.33	5	54.24	4	91.09
6	Li Jiaqi / Xu Jiankun	China	120.41	6	47.40	6	73.01
7	Dominika Piątkowska / Dmitri Khromin	Poland	104.97	7	38.26	7	66.71

=== Ice dancing ===
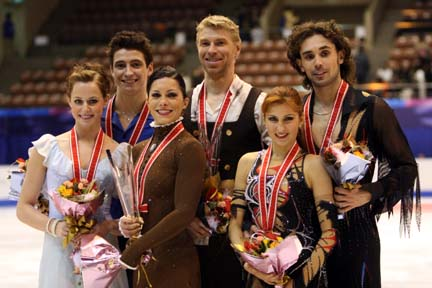
The ice dancing podium. From left: Tessa Virtue / Scott Moir (2nd), Isabelle Delobel / Olivier Schoenfelder (1st), Jana Khokhlova / Sergei Novitski (3rd).

Rank	Name	Nation	Total points	CD		OD		FD	
1	Isabelle Delobel / Olivier Schoenfelder	France	197.54	1	38.96	2	61.67	2	96.91
2	Tessa Virtue / Scott Moir	Canada	196.89	2	34.67	1	62.04	1	100.18
3	Jana Khokhlova / Sergei Novitski	Russia	186.96	3	34.23	3	57.84	3	94.89
4	Sinead Kerr / John Kerr	United Kingdom	172.37	4	31.79	4	54.47	4	86.11
5	Kristin Fraser / Igor Lukanin	Azerbaijan	162.15	5	29.85	5	51.26	5	81.04
6	Kimberly Navarro / Brent Bommentre	United States	156.08	6	28.25	6	49.03	6	78.80
7	Julia Zlobina / Alexei Sitnikov	Russia	144.33	7	27.13	10	44.16	8	73.04
8	Cathy Reed / Chris Reed	Japan	143.85	10	25.45	8	44.28	7	74.12
9	Alla Beknazarova / Vladimir Zuev	Ukraine	141.28	8	26.58	7	46.09	10	68.61
10	Huang Xintong / Zheng Xun	China	138.84	9	25.54	9	44.28	9	69.02
