= Keauna McLaughlin =

American pair skater (born 1992)

- McLaughlin / Brubaker in 2008.

Personal information
- Full name: Keauna Inaba McLaughlin
- Born: September 25, 1992 (age 34) Tarzana, California
- Home town: Los Angeles, California
- Height: 4 ft 11 in (1.50 m)

Figure skating career
- Country: United States
- Coach: John Nicks
- Skating club: Los Angeles FSC
- Retired: June 22, 2010
Medal record
Representing United States
Pairs Figure skating
Four Continents Championships
Silver medal – second place	2010 Jeonju	Pairs
World Junior Championships
Gold medal – first place	2007 Oberstdorf	Pairs
Junior Grand Prix Final
Gold medal – first place	2006–2007 Sofia	Pairs

Keauna Inaba McLaughlin (born September 25, 1992) is an American former competitive pair skater. With partner Rockne Brubaker, she is the 2008 & 2009 U.S. National Champion, the 2010 Four Continents silver medalist, and the 2007 World Junior Champion.

== Personal life ==
Keauna McLaughlin was born in Tarzana, California. She moved to Colorado Springs, Colorado to train and attended Cheyenne Mountain High School. Her name is based on a Hawaiian word for "feminine wind running through the forest".

Her mother, Lei Ina, was a senior-level pair skater and skated professionally as a show skater with Disney on Ice. Her father left the family when she was a toddler.

== Career ==
McLaughlin began skating at the age of four. She originally competed in single skating. As a singles skater, she is the 2006 U.S. Juvenile silver medalist. She began pair skating at age 10 and focused entirely on pair skating when she teamed up with Brubaker.

With previous partner Ethan Burgess, McLaughlin won two consecutive medals at the U.S. Championships: the bronze medal at the novice level at the 2004 U.S. Championships and the pewter medal at the junior level at the 2005 U.S. Championships. Her partner was too old for the Junior Grand Prix circuit so they split and she skated on her own for a while.

When Rockne Brubaker's previous partnership ended due to a lack of height difference, his coach Dalilah Sappenfield called McLaughlin, whom she had seen competing at other events, and arranged a try-out. McLaughlin and Brubaker teamed up in May 2006. McLaughlin relocated from California to Colorado Springs.

The pair went undefeated in their first competitive season together (2006–2007). In that season, they competed on the 2006–2007 ISU Junior Grand Prix circuit and won both their events and the Junior Grand Prix Final. They went on to win the Junior title at both the 2007 U.S. Championships and the 2007 World Junior Championships. McLaughlin and Brubaker were the fourth American pair team in history to win the World Junior title. Because of the age difference between McLaughlin and Brubaker, this was their only junior-age-eligible season.

McLaughlin and Brubaker began the 2007–2008 season on the Grand Prix circuit at the 2007 Cup of China, where they won the silver medal. They won a second silver medal at the 2007 NHK Trophy. Their success at these two competitions qualified them for the 2007–2008 Grand Prix Final, but they withdrew after the short program due to an injury to Brubaker.

Later that season, they competed at the 2008 U.S. Championships and won the senior national title, becoming the first U.S. pairs team in 51 years to win consecutive junior and senior national titles. Despite winning the U.S. Championships, McLaughlin and Brubaker were not assigned to the World Championship team or the World Junior Championship team due to ISU age restrictions. McLaughlin was too young for senior ISU championships and Brubaker was too old for the World Junior Championships. McLaughlin and Brubaker's win, combined with the wins of Jessica Rose Paetsch / Jon Nuss on the junior level, and Brynn Carman / Christopher Knierim on the novice level, gave their coach Dalilah Sappenfield a sweep of national pair champions for 2008, an accomplishment which led to Sappenfield being named Coach of the Year.

McLaughlin and Brubaker began the 2008–2009 season at the 2008 Skate America, where they won the silver medal. A week later they competed at the 2008 Skate Canada International, where they won the bronze medal. At the 2009 U.S. Championships, McLaughlin and Brubaker successfully defended their national title, which resulted in them being selected to compete at the 2009 Four Continents and the 2009 Worlds. They placed 5th at Four Continents and 11th at the World Championships.

In May 2009, McLaughlin and Brubaker changed coaches to John Nicks and relocated to California.

McLaughlin and Brubaker began the 2009–2010 season at the 2009 Cup of Russia, where they won the bronze medal. They continued their season at the 2009 Skate America, where they placed 4th. As the top American pair team on the international circuit, McLaughlin and Brubaker entered the 2010 U.S. Championships as the favorites to win their third consecutive national title and secure one of the two pair skating berths on the U.S. Olympic team. Despite several days of strong practices, they delivered an uncharacteristically rough short program, including falls on a triple salchow and a freak fall on a death spiral, leaving them in 7th place. The pair was able to move up to 5th place after the long program but it was not enough to win a place on the Olympic team.

Determined to rebound from their National Championship result, McLaughlin and Brubaker competed at the 2010 Four Continents less than ten days later. There, they recorded a personal best score in the short program and ultimately won the silver medal.

On June 22, 2010, McLaughlin announced the end of her partnership with Brubaker and also announced her retirement.

== Post-eligible career ==
In 2010, she was cast on Skating with the Stars as a skating pro. Her partner was Brandon Mychal Smith.

== Programs ==
(with Brubaker)

Season	Short program	Free skating	Exhibition
2009–2010	Unchained Melody by Alex North, Hy Zaret	Slumdog Millionaire by A. R. Rahman	Tell Him by Colbie Caillat
2008–2009	Malagueña by Ernesto Lecuona choreo. by Lea Ann Miller	West Side Story by Leonard Bernstein, Stephen Sondheim choreo. by Lea Ann Miller	Play That Funky Music by Wild Cherry; Something by The Beatles
2007–2008	Moonlight Sonata by Ludwig van Beethoven choreo. by Dalilah Sappenfield	Romeo and Juliet by Sergei Prokofiev; Romeo and Juliet by Nino Rota choreo. by Dalilah Sappenfield	Play That Funky Music by Wild Cherry
2006–2007	Somewhere in Time by John Barry choreo. by Dalilah Sappenfield	Romeo and Juliet by Sergei Prokofiev; Romeo and Juliet by Nino Rota choreo. by Dalilah Sappenfield	Play That Funky Music by Wild Cherry

== Competitive highlights ==
=== With Brubaker ===
Results
International
Event	2006–07	2007–08	2008–09	2009–10
Worlds			11th	
Four Continents			5th	2nd
Grand Prix Final		WD		
GP Cup of China		2nd		
GP Cup of Russia				3rd
GP NHK Trophy		2nd		
GP Skate America			2nd	4th
GP Skate Canada			3rd	
International: Junior
Junior Worlds	1st			
JGP Final	1st			
JGP Hungary	1st			
JGP Taipei	1st			
National
U.S. Champ.	1st J.	1st	1st	5th
GP = Grand Prix; JGP = Junior Grand Prix; J. = Junior level; WD = Withdrew

=== With Burgess ===
Event	2003–2004	2004–2005
U.S. Championships	3rd N.	4th J.
Levels: N. = Novice; J. = Junior
