= Joannie Rochette =

Canadian figure skater

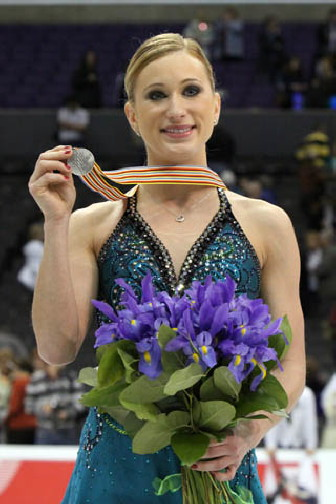
- Rochette at the 2009 Worlds.

Personal information
- Born: January 13, 1986 (age 40) Montreal, Quebec, Canada
- Home town: La Visitation-de-l'Île-Dupas, Quebec, Canada
- Height: 1.60 m (5 ft 3 in)

Figure skating career
- Country: Canada
- Skating club: CPA Berthierville
- Retired: 2013

Medal record
Event	Gold medal – first place	Silver medal – second place	Bronze medal – third place
Olympic Games	0	0	1
World Championships	0	1	0
Four Continents Championships	0	2	1
Grand Prix Final	0	0	1
Canadian Championships	6	2	1
World Team Trophy	0	1	0
Medal list
Olympic Games
Bronze medal – third place	2010 Vancouver	Singles
World Championships
Silver medal – second place	2009 Los Angeles	Singles
Four Continents Championships
Silver medal – second place	2008 Goyang	Singles
Silver medal – second place	2009 Vancouver	Singles
Bronze medal – third place	2007 Colorado Springs	Singles
Grand Prix Final
Bronze medal – third place	2004–05 Beijing	Singles
Canadian Championships
Gold medal – first place	2005 London	Singles
Gold medal – first place	2006 Ottawa	Singles
Gold medal – first place	2007 Halifax	Singles
Gold medal – first place	2008 Vancouver	Singles
Gold medal – first place	2009 Saskatoon	Singles
Gold medal – first place	2010 London	Singles
Silver medal – second place	2003 Saskatoon	Singles
Silver medal – second place	2004 Edmonton	Singles
Bronze medal – third place	2002 Hamilton	Singles
World Team Trophy
Silver medal – second place	2009 Tokyo	Team

Joannie Rochette (born January 13, 1986) is a Canadian physician and retired competitive figure skater. She is the 2010 Olympic bronze medallist, the 2009 World silver medallist, the 2008 and 2009 Four Continents silver medallist, the 2004 Grand Prix Final bronze medallist, and a six-time (2005–10) Canadian national champion.

== Career ==
Rochette was born January 13, 1986, in Montreal, Quebec. She was raised in La Visitation-de-l'Île-Dupas.

Rochette began skating when she was just two years old after her mother took her to the rink. She began taking lessons from Nathalier Riquier at the Berthierville Skating Club. In 1999, she started working with a team of coaches in Trois Rivieres and St-Leonard: Manon Perron, Nathalie Martin, Normand Proft and Danielle Robillard. In the 1999–2000 season, she won the 2000 Canadian Championships on the novice level.

=== 2000–01 season: Junior Grand Prix debut ===
The following season she debuted on the ISU Junior Grand Prix (JGP) series. She placed 5th at the 2000–01 ISU Junior Grand Prix event in France and 4th at the event in Mexico. She qualified for the 2001 Canadian Championships by winning both her qualifying events. At the Canadian Championships, she won her second consecutive national title, this time on the Junior level. She was then sent to the 2001 World Junior Championships, where she placed 8th.

=== 2001–02 season ===
In the 2001–02 season, Rochette competed on the 2001–02 ISU Junior Grand Prix, winning the silver medal at the event in Italy. She won the bronze medal at the 2002 Canadian Championships on the senior level and qualified for the teams to the 2002 Four Continents and the 2002 Junior Worlds. At Four Continents, her second senior international event, Rochette placed 8th. She went on to place 5th at the World Junior Championships.

=== 2002–03 season ===
In the 2002–03 season, Rochette won the silver medal at the 2003 Canadian Championships. She placed 8th at the 2003 Four Continents and 17th at the 2003 World Championships.

=== 2003–04 season: Grand Prix debut ===
In the 2003–04 season, Rochette debuted on the ISU Grand Prix of Figure Skating series. She placed 10th at the 2003 Skate Canada and 4th at the 2003 Cup of Russia. She competed at the 2003 Bofrost Cup on Ice and won the event. At the 2004 Canadian Championships, Rochette won her second consecutive silver medal. She placed 4th at the 2004 Four Continents and moved up to 8th at the World Championships.

=== 2004–05 season: Bronze at GP Final, first senior national title ===
In the 2004–05 season, Rochette won the bronze medal at the 2004 Cup of China and then won the 2004 Trophée Eric Bompard. She qualified for the 2004–05 Grand Prix Final, where she won the bronze medal. She won the 2005 Canadian Championships, her first Canadian senior title, which made her the first Canadian female skater to have won the Canadian Championships at all three levels (Novice, Junior, and Senior). She placed 11th at the 2005 World Championships. Her placement, combined with that of Cynthia Phaneuf, earned Canada two entries to the 2006 Winter Olympics.

=== 2005–06 season: First Olympics ===
In the 2005–06 Olympic season, Rochette won the silver medal at the 2005 Skate Canada and placed 4th at the 2005 Trophée Eric Bompard. She won her second consecutive national title at the 2006 Canadian Championships. At the 2006 Winter Olympics, Rochette placed 5th. At the 2006 World Championships, Rochette led following the qualifying round, then placed 7th in the short program and 8th in the free skate to place 7th overall. She had fallen twice on her jumps.

=== 2006–07 season: First Four Continents medal ===
In the 2006–07 season, Rochette won the 2006 Skate Canada and placed 4th at the 2006 Trophée Eric Bompard, and missed out on qualifying for the Grand Prix Final on a tie-break. At the 2007 Canadian Championships, Rochette won her third consecutive national title. She won the bronze medal at the 2007 Four Continents and placed 10th at the 2007 World Championships.

=== 2007–08 season ===
In the 2007–08 season, Rochette won the bronze medals at the 2007 Skate Canada and the 2007 Cup of Russia. At the 2008 Canadian Championships, she won her fourth consecutive national title. She won the silver medal at the 2008 Four Continents and placed 5th at the 2008 World Championships.

=== 2008–09 season: World silver medal ===
In the 2008–09 season, Rochette won the 2008 Skate Canada. She then won the 2008 Trophée Eric Bompard, beating reigning World Champion Mao Asada, and credited her work with a psychologist for her improved performances. She qualified for the 2008–09 Grand Prix Final, where she placed 4th. She won her fifth consecutive national title at the 2009 Canadian Championships. At the 2009 Four Continents Championships, she won the silver medal, again beating Asada. At the 2009 World Championships, Rochette won the silver medal, becoming the first Canadian woman since Elizabeth Manley to medal at the World Championships.

=== 2009–10 season ===
For the 2009–10 Grand Prix season, Rochette was assigned to the 2009 Cup of China, and the 2009 Skate Canada International. She started off the season with at the Cup of China, where she placed 7th in the short program, with 52.12 points, 10.08 points behind overnight leader Mirai Nagasu. During the free skate she rebounded, placing 2nd with 111.06 points behind Akiko Suzuki, who placed 1st in that segment. Rochette won the bronze medal with 163.18 points, behind gold medallist Suzuki and silver medallist Kiira Korpi.

At the 2009 Skate Canada, she scored a new personal best in the short program, 70.00 points, placing her first. During the free skate, she placed first again, with 112.90 points. She won the gold medal ahead of silver medallist Alissa Czisny and bronze medallist Laura Lepistö.

Rochette qualified for the 2009–10 Grand Prix Final. She placed 4th in the short program with 60.94 points, 5.2 points behind overnight leader, Miki Ando. Rochette placed 5th in the free skate, earning only 95.77 points. She placed 5th overall with 156.71 points, 32.15 points behind gold medallist Yuna Kim.

==== 2010 Winter Olympics ====
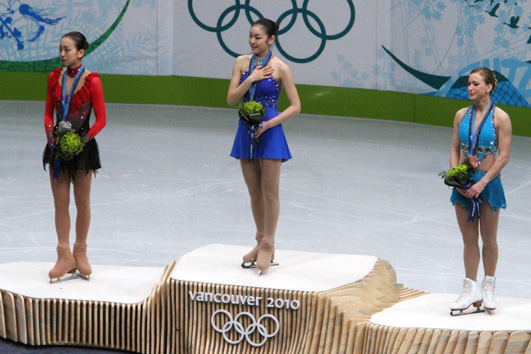
Rochette on the podium at the 2010 Winter Olympics.

Rochette was nominated to represent Canada at the 2010 Winter Olympics after winning her sixth straight Canadian National title.

At the Olympic Village, Rochette received the news that her mother had died shortly after arriving in Vancouver. Upon hearing the news, NBC speed-skating commentator Dan Jansen sent an e-mail to Rochette and shared his experiences of his sister's death during the Calgary Olympics (Canada's last Olympics before Vancouver).

Rochette chose to continue competing in her mother's honour. She recorded a new personal best in the short program, scoring 71.36 points, the third highest score of the night. Two days later, she held on to her third-place position after the long program and won the bronze medal. She became the fifth Canadian to win a medal in ladies' figure skating at the Olympics.

Rochette's performance at the 2010 Olympics figure skating gala on February 27 featured the original French version of Celine Dion's song "Fly", «Vole» as a tribute to her mother (a long-time fan of Dion), ending with her face raised to the heavens.

Because of her inspiring determination in the face of these circumstances, along with Petra Majdič, she received the inaugural Terry Fox Award for the 2010 Winter Olympics. Fellow Canadian Olympian Jon Montgomery described Rochette as having shown "so much heart and determination at the 2010 Games (...) What she displayed is honestly what the Olympics are all about." Rochette was chosen as the flag bearer for the closing ceremony.

=== Post-Olympics ===
In December 2010, Rochette was voted the Female Athlete of the Year by The Canadian Press.

She did not compete at the 2010 World Championships and later announced that she would not take part in the 2010–11 Grand Prix series. In an October 2012 interview, Rochette said she was weighing a return to competition. She confirmed in September 2013 that she would not compete for a spot to the 2014 Olympics but would travel to Sochi with the CBC for an undetermined role mainly in French.

In August 2017, Skate Canada announced Rochette would be inducted into the Skate Canada Hall of Fame as a member of the 2017 class.

== Personal life ==
On February 21, 2010, two days before the beginning of ladies' figure skating competition at the Winter Olympics in Vancouver, her mother, Thérèse Rochette, died of a heart attack at age 55 at Vancouver General Hospital after arriving to watch her compete; Rochette chose to remain in the competition and skate in her mother's honour. At her mother's funeral, she placed her Olympic bronze medal on the casket for some time. Rochette has been a spokesperson for the "iheartmom" campaign at the University of Ottawa Heart Institute, which deals with raising awareness for heart disease in women. She has also worked with World Vision.

Rochette received her DEC from Collège André-Grasset's Natural Sciences program in November 2011. It took 7 years for her to complete the program, which could have been finished in two or three years under normal circumstances. In the fall of 2015, she enrolled in a medical preparatory year at McGill University, and continued as a medical student in 2016. In September 2017, Rochette participated in a white coat ceremony at the start of her second year in the medical school.

Rochette earned her medical degree in April 2020 and announced that she would be working in Quebec's long-term care homes during the COVID-19 pandemic.

== Programs ==
=== Post-2010 ===
Season	Free skating Pro-am events	Exhibition
2015–16	Gravity by Sara Bareilles	Hands to Myself by Selena Gomez; Sour Cherry; Gravity by Sara Bareilles; O Holy Night
2014–15	La Vie en rose covered by Ute Lemper choreo. by Marie-France Dubreuil	La Vie en rose covered by Ute Lemper choreo. by Marie-France Dubreuil; Addicted to You by Avicii; Keep On Walking by Marc Sway
2013–14	Notre Dame de Paris by Luc Plamondon choreo. by Yuka Sato	Notre Dame de Paris by Luc Plamondon choreo. by Yuka Sato; Shot Me Down by David Guetta; Santa Baby by Joan Javits, Philip Springer; At Last by Mack Gordon, Harry Warren covered by Cyndi Lauper; Hurt by Christina Aguilera; That Man by Caro Emerald
2012–13	For Me, Formidable by France D'Amour	Is It a Crime by Sade; That Man by Caro Emerald; What About Me performed by Measha Brueggergosman; Show Me How You Burlesque by Christina Aguilera
2011–12	The Firebird by Igor Stravinsky choreo. by David Wilson	Indestructible by Robyn choreo. by Jeffrey Buttle; For Me, Formidable by France D'Amour; The Perfect Gift by The Canadian Tenors
2010–11	Samson and Delilah by Camille Saint-Saëns choreo. by Lori Nichol	True Colors performed by Cyndi Lauper; Show Me How You Burlesque by Christina Aguilera; O Holy Night by Adolphe Adam

=== Pre-2010 ===
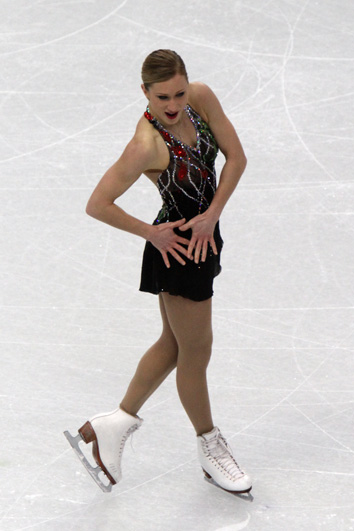
Rochette during her short program La Cumparsita at the 2010 Winter Olympics.

Season	Short program	Free skating	Exhibition
2009–10	La cumparsita by Gerardo Matos Rodríguez choreo. by Shae-Lynn Bourne	Samson and Delilah by Camille Saint-Saëns choreo. by Lori Nichol	Objection (Tango) by Shakira; Vole by Celine Dion; Summertime by George Gershwin performed by Renee Olstead; My Immortal by Evanescence
2008–09	Summertime by George Gershwin choreo. by Shae-Lynn Bourne	Concierto de Aranjuez by Joaquín Rodrigo choreo. by Lori Nichol	Die Another Day by Madonna; Believe by Suzie McNeil; Objection (Tango) by Shakira
2007–08	Piano Concerto No. 1 by Pyotr Ilyich Tchaikovsky; Piano Concerto by Robert Schumann choreo. by Sandra Bezic	N'as-tu pas Honte; Un Grand Homme est Mort; Aimer (from Don Juan) by Félix Gray choreo. by David Wilson	Die Another Day by Madonna; Finally by Fergie; Summertime by George Gershwin performed by Renee Olstead
2006–07	Little Wing by Jimi Hendrix choreo. by Sandra Bezic	N'as-tu pas Honte; Un Grand Homme est Mort; Aimer (from Don Juan) by Félix Gray choreo. by David Wilson	Summertime by George Gershwin performed by Renee Olstead; Heartbreaker by Pat Benatar; Vole by Celine Dion
2005–06	Like a Prayer (instrumental version) by Madonna and Patrick Leonard choreo. by David Wilson	Les Feuilles Mortes by Joseph Kosma; Hymne à l'Amour by Édith Piaf choreo. by David Wilson	Like a Prayer by Madonna; Vole by Celine Dion
2004–05	Dumky Trio by Antonín Dvořák choreo. by David Wilson	The Firebird by Igor Stravinsky choreo. by David Wilson	Labour of Love by Frente!
2003–04	Metamorphoses and Other Plays by Willy Schwartz choreo. by David Wilson	Il Etait Une Fois le Diable by Ennio Morricone choreo. by David Wilson	Paint It Black by Vanessa Carlton
2002–03	Song from a Secret Garden by Rolf Lovland choreo. by David Wilson	Once Upon a Time in the West by Ennio Morricone choreo. by David Wilson	
2001–02	Somewhere in Time performed by Sir Simon Rattle Orchestra choreo. by Jean-Pierre Boulais	La Fete des Fleurs a Genzano by Riccardo Drigo London Festival Ballet orchestra choreo. by Jean-Pierre Boulais	
2000–01	Somewhere in Time performed by Sir Simon Rattle Orchestra choreo. by Jean-Pierre Boulais	Istanbul not Constantinople by Joe Carr; Puttin' On the Ritz by Irving Berlin choreo. by Jean-Pierre Boulais	

== Competitive highlights ==
GP: Grand Prix; JGP: Junior Grand Prix

International
Event	00–01	01–02	02–03	03–04	04–05	05–06	06–07	07–08	08–09	09–10
Olympics						5th				3rd
Worlds			17th	8th	11th	7th	10th	5th	2nd	
Four Continents		9th	8th	4th			3rd	2nd	2nd	
GP Final					3rd				4th	5th
GP Bompard					1st	4th	4th		1st	
GP Cup of China					3rd					3rd
GP Cup of Russia				4th				3rd		
GP Skate Canada				10th		2nd	1st	3rd	1st	1st
Bofrost Cup				1st						
International: Junior
Junior Worlds	8th	5th								
JGP France	5th									
JGP Italy		3rd								
JGP Mexico	4th									
JGP Poland		5th								
National
Canadian Champ.	1st J.	3rd	2nd	2nd	1st	1st	1st	1st	1st	1st
J. = Junior

Team events
Event	05–06	06–07	08–09	09–10	10–11	11–12	13–14
World Team Trophy			2nd T 2nd P				
Japan Open	2nd T 2nd P	3rd T 3rd P		2nd T 1st P	2nd T 1st P	1st T 2nd P	2nd T 2nd P
T: Team result; P: Personal result. Medals awarded for team result only.

Pro-am events
Event	12–13	14–15	15–16
Medal Winners Open	2nd	1st	1st

== See also ==
- Petra Burka
- Karen Magnussen
- Elizabeth Manley
- Kaetlyn Osmond
- Barbara Ann Scott
