= Alexander Gazsi =

German ice dancer (born 1984)

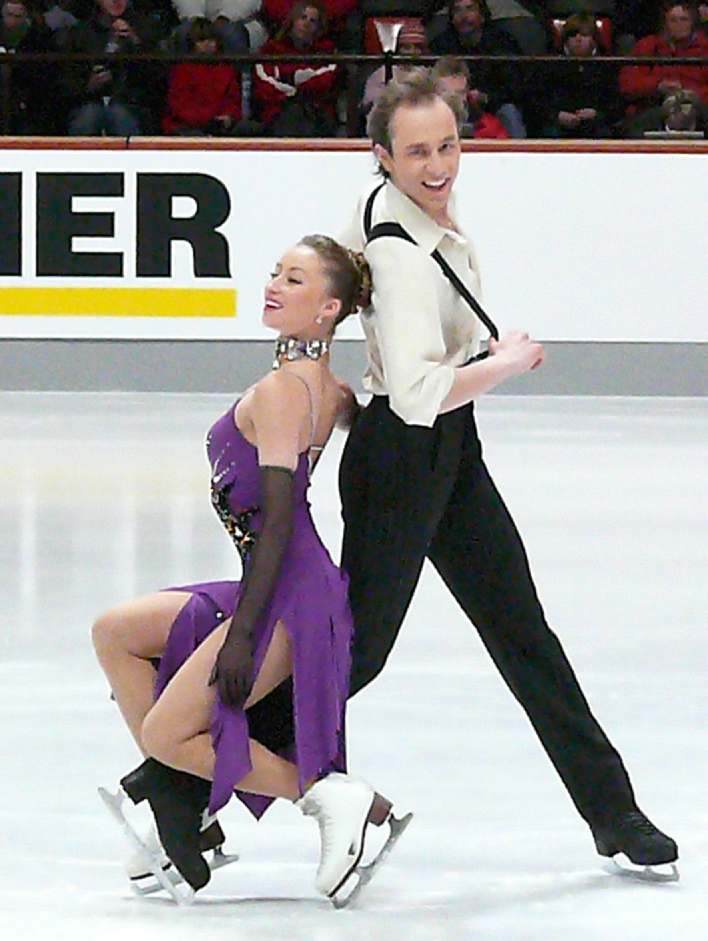
- Zhiganshina/Gazsi during the free dance at the 2007 German Championships

Personal information
- Born: 6 October 1984 (age 42) Chemnitz, East Germany
- Height: 1.84 m (6 ft 0 in)

Figure skating career
- Country: Germany
- Partner: Nelli Zhiganshina
- Coach: Rostislav Sinicyn, Martin Skotnicky
- Skating club: SC Berlin
- Began skating: 1988
- Retired: 2015

Alexander Gazsi (born 6 October 1984) is a German ice dancer. With partner Nelli Zhiganshina, he is a six-time German national champion (2007, 2011–2015) and has won twelve international medals. They have placed as high as 6th at the European Championships and 10th at the World Championships.

== Personal life ==
Alexander Gazsi was born on 6 October 1984 in Chemnitz, East Germany. His mother is a German from Kazakhstan and his father is Hungarian. He is in the sports division of the German army.

== Career ==
=== Early years ===
Gazsi began skating in 1988 at the age of four. The kids in his kindergarten class in East Germany were tested in various sports and he was chosen for the first one tested, figure skating. He switched from singles to ice dancing at age seven.

Early in his career, Gazsi skated with Mandy Kästner and Julia Novikov. By 2003, he was competing with Sandra Gissmann. They appeared four times on the ISU Junior Grand Prix series and placed 17th at the 2004 World Junior Championships.

=== Partnership with Nelli Zhiganshina ===
==== 2005–2010 ====
In June 2005, Gazsi had a successful tryout with Nelli Zhiganshina in Moscow. At the start of their partnership, they trained mainly in Moscow with coaches Elena Kustarova and Svetlana Alexeeva and, during summers, in Berlin and Chemnitz due to Gazsi's army service. They later changed coaches to Alexander Zhulin and Oleg Volkov, also in Moscow.

Zhiganshina/Gazsi won bronze at their first German Championships in 2006, their only competition of the season. The next season they won their first national title, placed 16th at the 2007 Europeans and 18th at Worlds.

During the 2007–08 season, they made their debut on the Grand Prix circuit, placing 7th at Skate Canada and 8th at Cup of Russia. They won silver at German Nationals and again finished 18th at Worlds.

During the 2008–09 season, Zhiganshina/Gazsi did not compete on the Grand Prix circuit. Zhiganshina continued to visit Germany on a three-month tourist visa because the low income from the sport meant she did not qualify for residency and Germany did not have as high caliber ice dancers as Moscow to train alongside. Although favored to win 2009 German Nationals, they placed second and missed the European and World teams. They considered leaving competition to focus on show skating and worked with circus acrobats in Moscow but decided to continue their competitive career and moved to Oberstdorf, Germany in spring 2009 to work with coaches Rostislav Sinicyn and Martin Skotnicky. During the 2009–10 season, they placed third at German Nationals and were not sent to the European or World Championships. They were not eligible for the 2010 Winter Olympics due to Zhiganshina not having German citizenship.

==== 2010–present ====
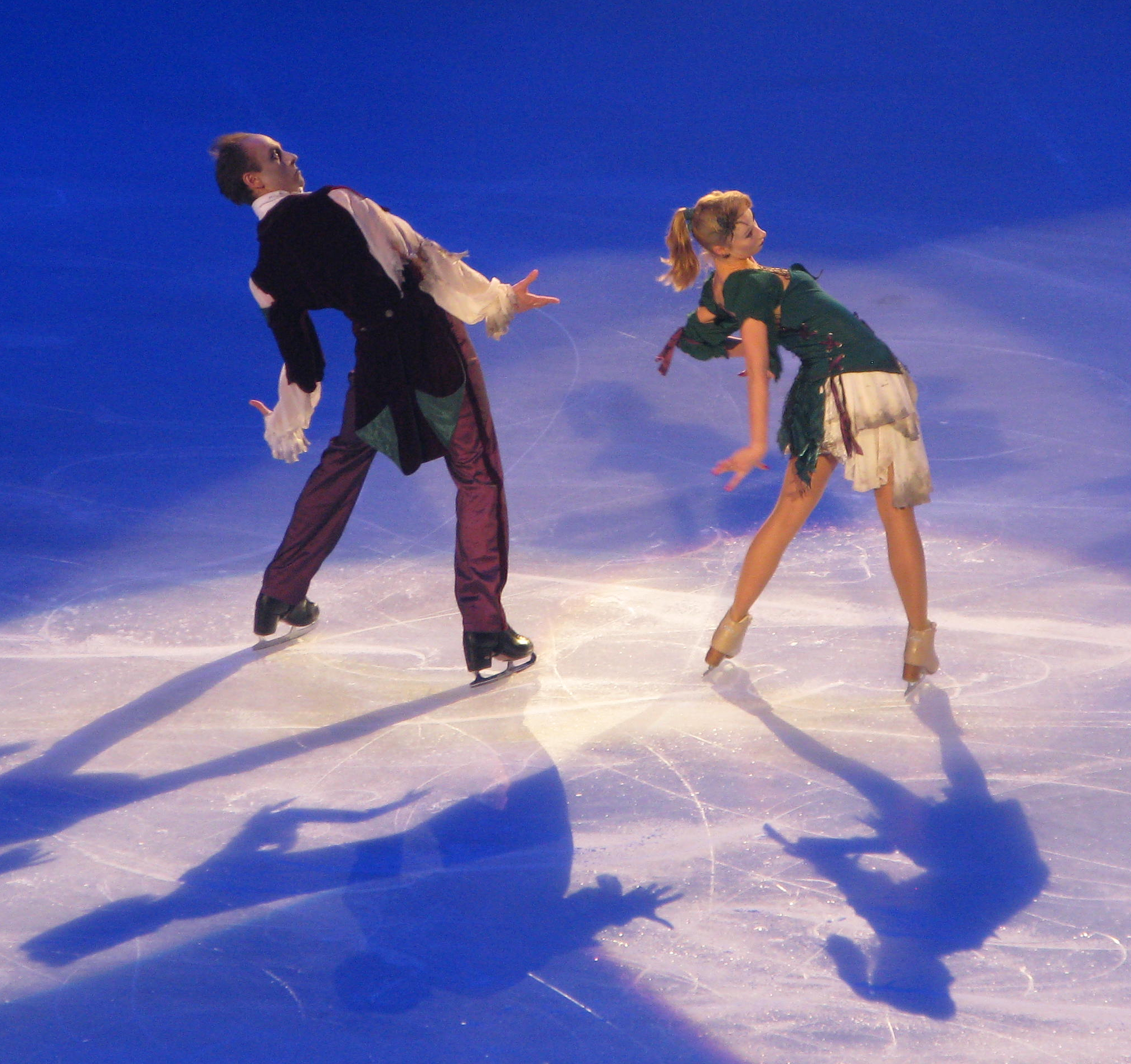
Zhiganshina/Gazsi at Bompard 2013.

During the 2010–11 season, Zhiganshina/Gazsi again received no Grand Prix invitations but won three medals at senior B events. They won their second national title and were selected to compete at the European Championships for the first time in three years. At Europeans, they were 8th in the short dance, then edged past Nóra Hoffmann / Maxim Zavozin by 0.39 points into 7th place overall after the free dance. This was the first top-ten result for German ice dancers since 2003 (Kati Winkler / Rene Lohse). The result gave Germany two berths to the 2012 European ice dancing event. Zhiganshina/Gazsi finished 11th at the 2011 World Championships, earning invitations to two Grand Prix events the following season.

In preparation for the 2011–12 season, Zhiganshina/Gazsi went to Sofia, Bulgaria, to work with choreographer Maxim Staviski, with whom they also worked in previous years. They began their season at the 2011 Nebelhorn Trophy where they won the silver medal. After placing fourth at both of their Grand Prix events, the 2011 Skate America and 2011 NHK Trophy, the duo finished eighth at the 2012 European Championships and eleventh at the 2012 World Championships.

In 2012–13, Zhiganshina/Gazsi placed a career-best sixth at the 2013 European Championships and tenth at the 2013 World Championships. As a result of their Worlds placement, Germany qualified two spots in ice dancing at the 2014 Olympics.

In 2013–14, Zhiganshina/Gazsi won their fifth national title and were selected to represent Germany at the 2014 Winter Olympics in Sochi. Germany assigned them to the team event short dance, where they placed sixth; Germany, however, did not qualify for the free dance. Zhiganshina/Gazsi finished 11th in the separate ice dancing event.

== Programs ==
=== With Zhiganshina ===
Season	Short dance	Free dance	Exhibition
2014–2015	La Maza by Silvio Rodríguez; Ameksa by Taalbi Brothers choreo. by Stéphane Lambiel	Fredrik Rydman's; Swan Lake Reloaded: Rothbart's Solo; Then There's Us; Don't Go; Rothbart's Solo choreo. by Stéphane Lambiel	
2013–2014	Le Jazz Hot performed by Glee cast	Carrigan & Dips by James Horner; Mrs. ES Dancecard by Elliot Goldenthal; I'm Happy by the Gorillaz	
2012–2013	Polka by Alfred Schnittke; Waltz from Admiral	"Two from the Grave": Tore My Heart performed by Oona; Et Maintenant by Jean-Marc Zelwer; Rama Lama by Roisin Murphy	Tango de Roxanne (from Moulin Rouge!)
2011–2012	Desperados (from Once Upon a Time in Mexico); Mambo	Romeo + Juliet by Craig Armstrong	
2010–2011	Unknown from Cirque du Soleil	Liebesträume by Franz Liszt; The Four Seasons by Antonio Vivaldi	
	Original dance		
2009–2010			
2007–2008	Ukrainian dance: Black Eyebrows and Hazel Eyes; Marusia performed by Joseph Kobzon	La Bohème performed by Charles Aznavour	
2006–2007	New Tango Besta Rio	Sandunga by Arturo Sandoval; Summertime by George Gershwin; Jazz Police by Goodwin	

=== With Gissmann ===
Season	Original dance	Free dance
2004–2005	Quickstep: Tuxedo Junction; Slow foxtrot; Quickstep: Song of Dancing	Queen: We Will Rock You; Who Wants to Live Forever; Innuendo
2003–2004	Blues: Business of Love (from The Mask); Swing: Run Lama Run by John De	Palladio by Karl Jenkins; Buenos Aires Tango by Jacques Loussier; Palladio by Karl Jenkins

== Competitive highlights ==
GP: Grand Prix; CS: Challenger Series (began in the 2014–15 season); JGP: Junior Grand Prix

=== With Zhiganshina ===
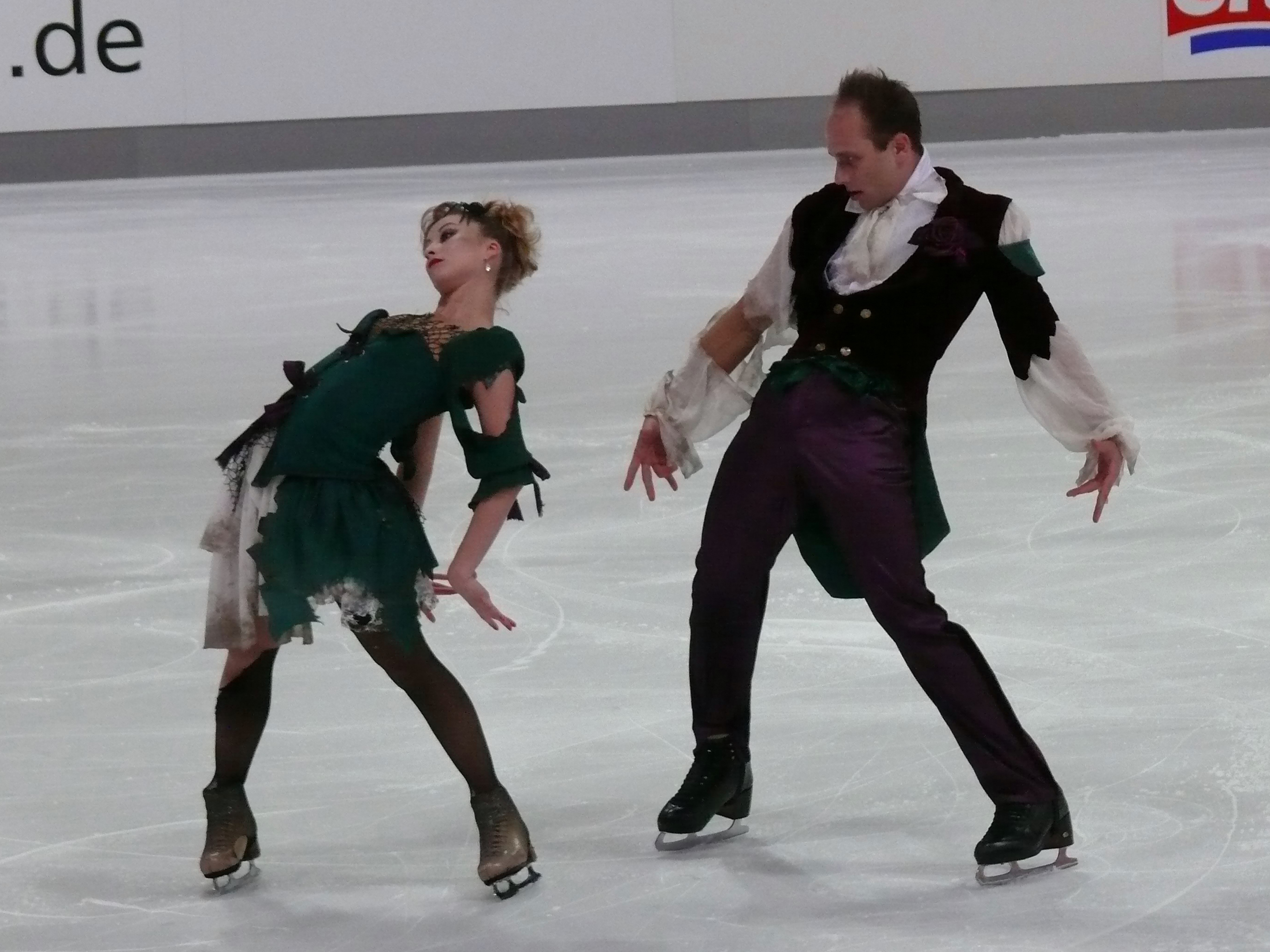
Zhiganshina/Gazsi perform their zombie-themed free dance at the 2012 Nebelhorn Trophy

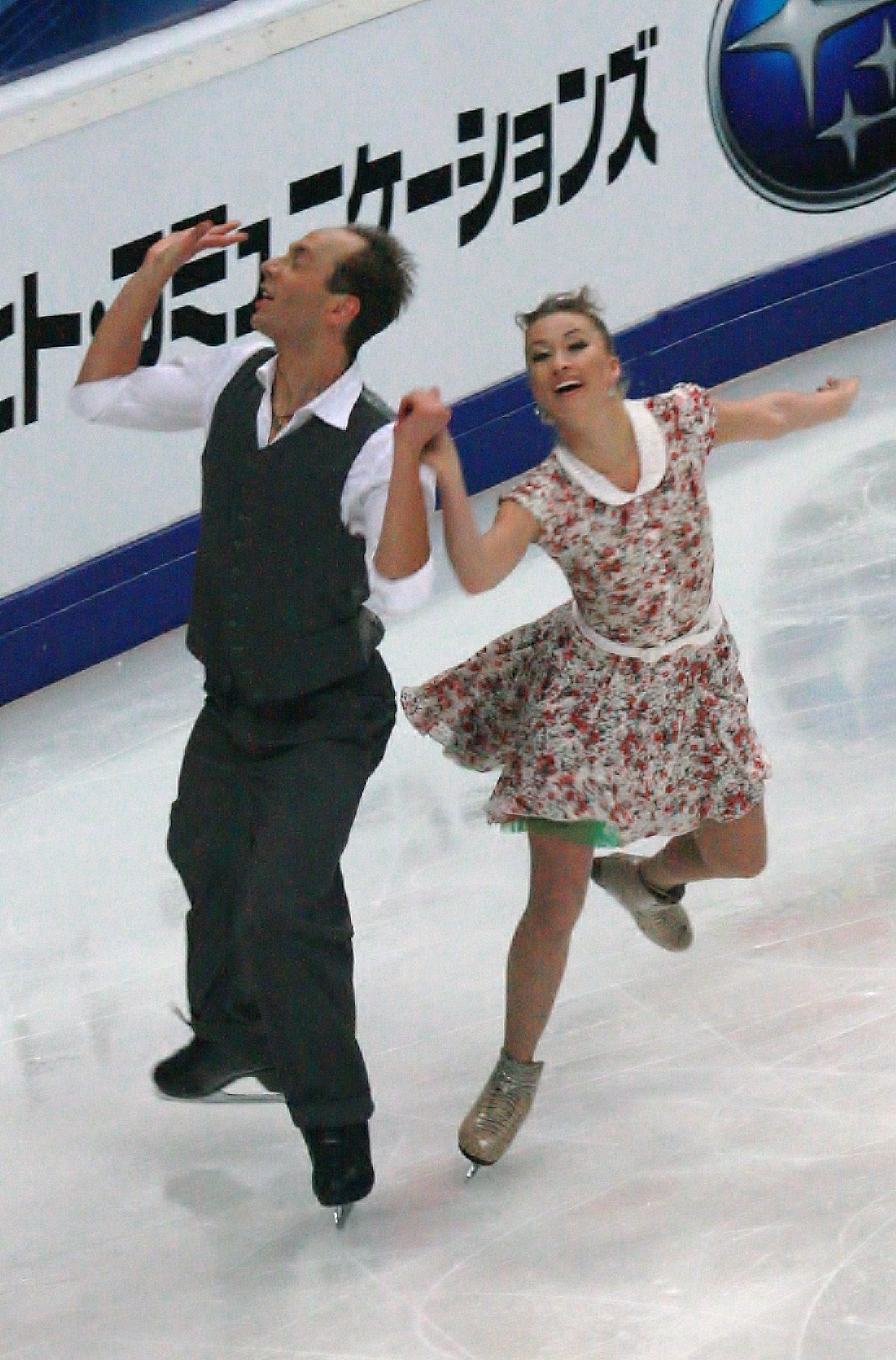
Zhiganshina/Gazsi perform their short dance at the 2012 Rostelecom Cup

International
Event	2005–06	2006–07	2007–08	2008–09	2009–10	2010–11	2011–12	2012–13	2013–14	2014–15
Olympics									11th	
Worlds		18th	18th			11th	11th	10th	11th	WD
Europeans		16th				7th	8th	6th	7th	7th
GP Bompard									4th	
GP Cup of Russia			8th					5th		
GP NHK Trophy							4th			4th
GP Skate America							4th	5th		
GP Skate Canada			7th						6th	5th
CS Finlandia										2nd
CS Nebelhorn						4th	2nd	3rd		3rd
Golden Spin			5th				1st			
NRW Trophy						2nd				
Nepela Trophy				1st	6th	3rd	1st		5th	
Pavel Roman				1st	3rd	1st		1st		
Volvo Open									2nd	
National
German Champ.	3rd	1st	2nd	2nd	3rd	1st	1st	1st	1st	1st
Team events
Olympics									8th T	

=== With Gissmann ===
International
Event	2003–04	2004–05
Junior Worlds	17th	
JGP China		6th
JGP Japan	6th	
JGP Romania		7th
JGP Slovakia	5th	
National
German Champ.	2nd J.	
