= Nina Petushkova =

Russian figure skater

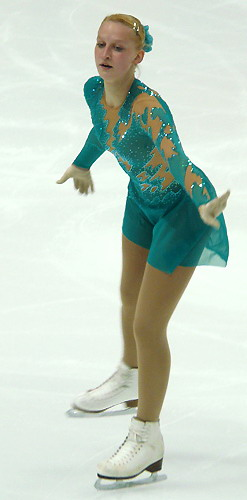
- Petushkova in 2008.

Personal information
- Full name: Nina Valeryevna Petushkova
- Born: 18 May 1992 (age 34) Kyiv, Ukraine
- Home town: Moscow

Figure skating career
- Country: Russia
- Skating club: Yunost Moskva
- Retired: 2010

Nina Valeryevna Petushkova (Russian: Нина Валерьевна Петушкова; born 18 May 1992) is a Russian former competitive figure skater. She is the 2008 Russian silver medalist. She was born in Kyiv, Ukraine, and made her senior international debut at the 2007 Cup of Russia, where she placed sixth.

== Programs ==
Season	Short program	Free skating
2008–09	Tombe la Neige by Salvatore Adamo	The Red Arrow Train by Alexei Mazhukov
2007–08	Colourful Dreams by Didulya	Four Seasons by Antonio Vivaldi

== Competitive highlights ==
GP: Grand Prix; JGP: Junior Grand Prix

International
Event	02–03	03–04	04–05	05–06	06–07	07–08	08–09	09–10
European Champ.						17th		
GP Cup of Russia						6th	10th	
International: Junior
JGP Netherlands					7th			
Triglav Trophy	6th J							
National
Russian Champ.				11th	9th	2nd	4th	14th
Russian Jr. Champ.				4th	8th		18th	
J = Junior level
