= Andrei Griazev =

Russian competitive figure skater (born 1985)

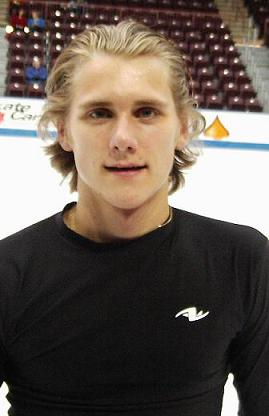
- Andrei Griazev in October 2005

Personal information
- Full name: Andrei Vladimirovich Griazev
- Born: 26 July 1985 (age 41) Perm, Russian SFSR, Soviet Union
- Home town: Moscow, Russia
- Height: 1.76 m (5 ft 9 1/2 in)

Figure skating career
- Country: Russia
- Discipline: Men's singles
- Began skating: 1989
- Retired: 2009
Russian Championships
Gold medal – first place	2007 Mytishchi	Singles
Silver medal – second place	2005 Saint Petersburg	Singles
Bronze medal – third place	2004 Saint Petersburg	Singles
Bronze medal – third place	2008 Saint Petersburg	Singles
World Junior Championships
Gold medal – first place	2004 The Hague	Singles
Junior Grand Prix Final
Silver medal – second place	2003–04 Malmö	Singles

Andrei Vladimirovich Griazev (Russian: Андрей Владимирович Грязев; born 26 July 1985) is a Russian former competitive figure skater. He is the 2005 Cup of China and 2007 Cup of Russia bronze medalist, 2004 World Junior champion, and 2007 Russian national champion.

== Personal life ==
Griazev was born 26 July 1985 in Perm, Russian SFSR, Soviet Union.

== Career ==
Griazev began skating at the age of four. At the age of 11, he moved from Perm to Saint Petersburg to train with coach Alexei Mishin. He trained at the Yubileyny Sports Palace.

During his time training with Mishin, Griazev learned the triple Axel jump. Griazev placed 14th at the 2002 Junior Worlds, after which Mishin sent him to work with his wife, Tatiana Mishina. Griazev left Yubileyny, returned to Perm, and did not skate at all for three months. In the summer of 2002, Griazev moved to Newington, Connecticut, to train with Tatiana Tarasova on the suggestion of Alexei Yagudin. He became the 2004 World Junior Champion. That same year, he won bronze at Russian senior nationals and earned a chance to compete at the 2004 European Championships and 2004 World Championships, where he placed 8th and 12th, respectively.

During the 2004–05 season, Griazev sustained a back injury and had to withdraw from the 2004 Skate America. He was 7th at 2004 Cup of Russia but then earned silver at Russian Nationals. He went again to the European Championships, where he placed 5th, and moved up a spot at Worlds to 11th.

For the 2005–06 season, Tarasova returned to Russia and so Griazev did as well, training with both Tarasova and Elena Vodorezova in Moscow. Griazev was 9th out of 11 men at the 2005 Skate Canada International. The very next week, however, he won the bronze medal at 2005 Cup of China, his first senior Grand Prix medal. At that competition, he was in the lead after the short program, and earned new personal best scores for his short program, long program, and overall total. At the 2006 Russian nationals, Griazev finished 9th and did not receive a berth to the European Championships and the Olympics. Due to the withdrawal of other skaters, Griazev was sent to 2006 Worlds, where he struggled in the qualifying and short programs, but performed a strong long program. Griazev returned to Russia in March 2006 to take part in the Italian Carnival skating tour produced by Ilia Averbukh. He had also taken part in this tour the previous year. His touring schedule was cut short when he sustained a knee injury and had to undergo surgery.

For the 2006–07 season, Griazev continued to struggle with consistency, as well as suffering illness at several competitions. At both the 2006 Trophée Eric Bompard and 2006 Cup of Russia, he finished 7th. At the 2007 Russian Championships, Griazev trailed Andrei Lutai after the short program but placed ahead in the long program and won his first national title. He went on to the 2007 European Championships, where he finished 16th and as a result missed the Russian team for the 2007 World Championships. He spent the spring of 2007 performing with Averbukh's skating tour, which traveled to over twenty cities in Russia, as well as shows in Lithuania, Latvia, and Israel.

For the 2007–08 season, Griazev was initially assigned to the 2007 Nebelhorn Trophy competition in Oberdstorf, Germany, but injured ligaments in his ankle in September 2007 and had to withdraw from the event. He won the bronze at the 2007 Cup of Russia in Moscow and placed 7th at the 2007 NHK Trophy. He won the bronze medal at the 2008 Russian Championships.

Griazev placed 5th at the 2009 Russian Championships. He retired from competitive skating following that season. In November 2009, he began skating on cruise ships.

== Programs ==
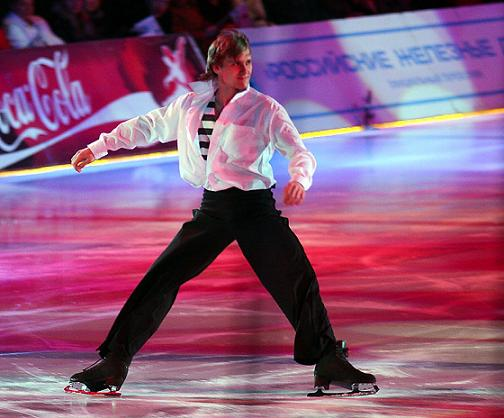
Griazev performs in a March 2007 ice show in Mytischi, Russia.

Season	Short program	Free skating	Exhibition
2007–08	Didle Mourani by Space	The Godfather by Nino Rota	Harlem Nocturne by Earle Hagen; You can leave your hat on by Joe Cocker
2006–07	Latin medley	Notre-Dame de Paris by Riccardo Cocciante; Le Temps des Cathédrales; Belle; Les Sans-Papiers	Latin medley
2005–06	Carmen by Georges Bizet	Notre-Dame de Paris by Riccardo Cocciante; Le Temps des Cathédrales; Belle; Les Sans-Papiers	Libertango; Carmen
2004–05	Carmen by Georges Bizet	The Feeling Begins by Peter Gabriel; Incantation by Benoit Jutras; The Feeling Begins by Peter Gabriel	Libertango
2003–04	Libertango Astor Piazzolla	La Strada by Nino Rota	Korobushka
2002–03	Korobushka by Bond		
2001–02	Incantation (from Cirque du Soleil)	The Barber of Seville by Gioachino Rossini	

== Results ==
GP: Grand Prix; JGP: Junior Grand Prix

International
Event	00–01	01–02	02–03	03–04	04–05	05–06	06–07	07–08	08–09
Worlds				12th	11th	17th			
Europeans				8th	5th		16th		
GP Bompard							7th		
GP Cup of China						3rd			
GP Cup of Russia					7th		7th	3rd	
GP NHK Trophy								7th	
GP Skate Canada						9th			
Cup of Nice	3rd				1st				
International: Junior
Junior Worlds		14th		1st					
JGP Final		6th	4th	2nd					
JGP Bulgaria				1st					
JGP Canada			1st						
JGP Czech Rep.		1st							
JGP Slovakia				1st					
JGP Sweden		1st							
JGP USA			1st						
National
Russian Champ.	8th	6th	5th	3rd	2nd	9th	1st	3rd	5th
Russian Jr. Champ.		2nd		1st					
