= Laura Lepistö =

Finnish figure skater

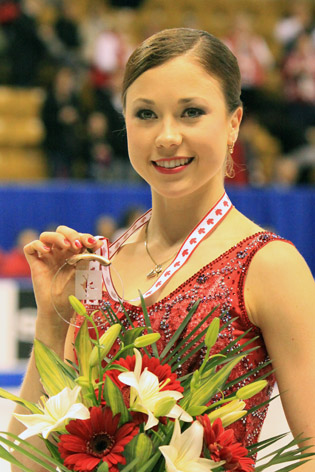
- Lepistö at 2009 Skate Canada.

Personal information
- Born: 25 April 1988 (age 38) Espoo
- Height: 1.64 m (5 ft 4 1/2 in)

Figure skating career
- Country: Finland
- Coach: Virpi Horttana
- Skating club: Espoon Jäätaiturit
- Began skating: 1992
- Retired: 25 March 2012

Medal record
World Championships
Bronze medal – third place	2010 Turin	Singles
European Championships
Gold medal – first place	2009 Helsinki	Singles
Silver medal – second place	2010 Tallinn	Singles
Bronze medal – third place	2008 Zagreb	Singles
Finnish Championships
Gold medal – first place	2008 Rauma	Singles
Gold medal – first place	2010 Jyväskylä	Singles
Silver medal – second place	2007 Mikkeli	Singles
Silver medal – second place	2009 Helsinki	Singles

Laura Anneli Lepistö (born 25 April 1988) is a Finnish former competitive figure skater. She is the 2010 world bronze medalist, the 2009 European champion, and a two-time (2008 and 2010) Finnish national champion.

After missing two seasons with various injuries, Lepistö announced on 25 March 2012, that she would not return to competitive skating.

== Personal life ==
Lepistö was born in Espoo, Finland. In September 2010, she started her higher education studies at the Aalto University School of Economics in Helsinki, Finland. In 2016, she received her master's degree in marketing. She married her longtime boyfriend, Tommi Huovinen, on 11 July 2015. In August 2018, she began working as brand manager for Riedell skates. In 2019, Lepistö appeared on the Finnish version of Strictly Come Dancing.

== Career ==
Lepistö started skating at the age of four, following her older sister's lead. She trained in Espoo and Vierumäki in Finland, Boston in the United States, and Tallinn and Tartu in Estonia.

=== 2002–2003 season ===
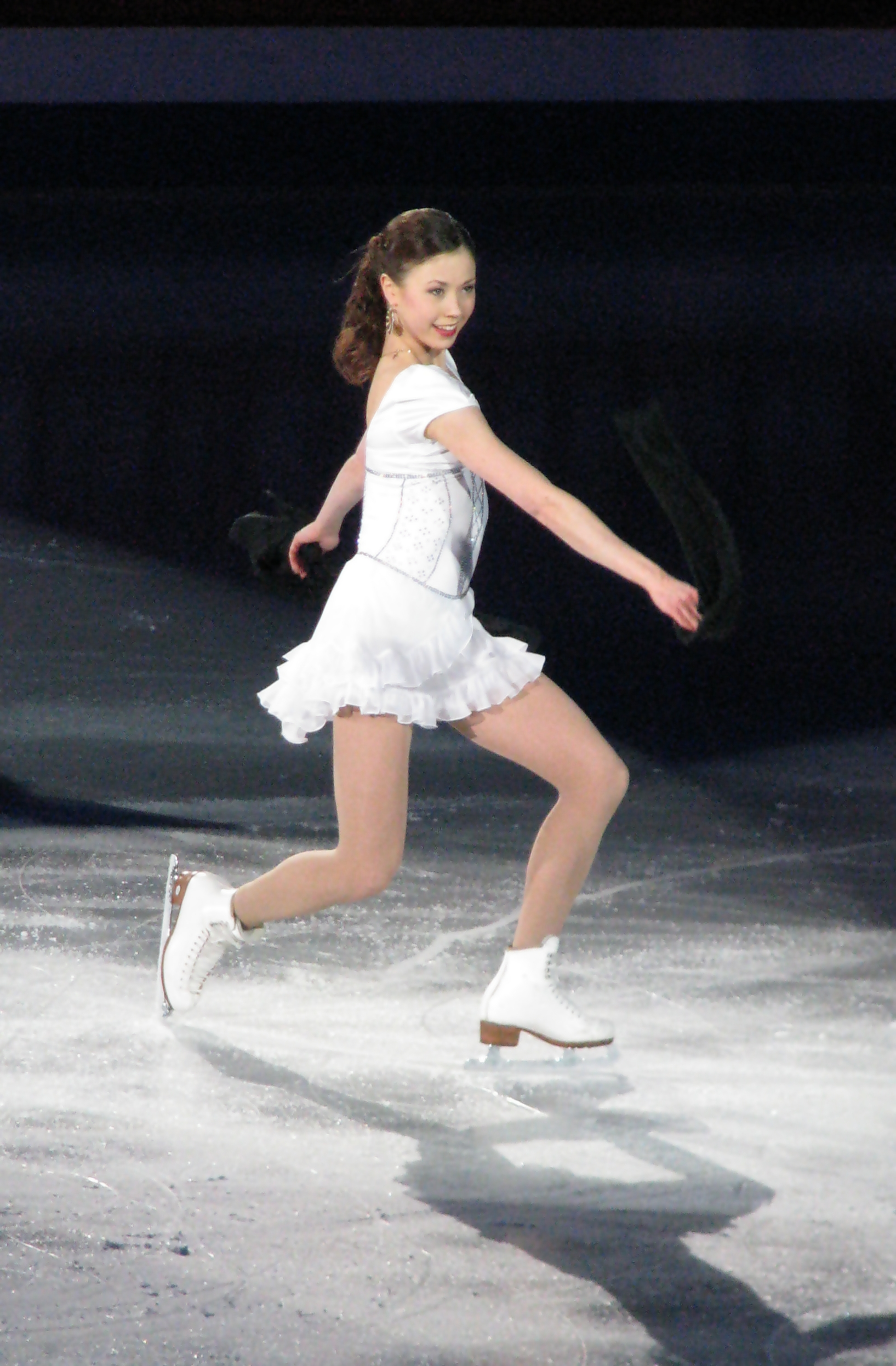
Lepistö at the 2010 European Championships.

Lepistö won the silver medal on the junior level at the Gardena Spring Trophy and the junior gold medal at the Warsaw Cup. She won the gold medal on the junior level at the 2003 Finnish Championships.

=== 2003–2004 season ===
Lepistö debuted on the ISU Junior Grand Prix circuit. She placed 12th at the 2003–04 ISU Junior Grand Prix event in Bulgaria and 8th at the event in Croatia. She placed 5th on the junior level at the 2004 Finnish Championships and won the bronze medal on the junior level at the 2004 Nordic Championships.

=== 2004–2005 season ===
Lepistö competed on the Junior Grand Prix circuit. She won the event in Belgrade and placed 9th at the event in Romania. She then won the junior national title at the 2005 Finnish Championships and the silver medal on the junior level at the 2005 Nordic Championships.

=== 2005–2006 season ===
Lepistö competed on the 2005 Junior Grand Prix circuit. She won the bronze medal at the event in Andorra and placed 4th in the event in Bulgaria. She placed 4th in her senior national debut at the 2006 Finnish Championships, and then won another junior silver medal at the 2006 Nordic Championships. She went on to make her World Junior debut, placing 9th.

=== 2006–2007 season ===
Lepistö competed at one event on the Junior Grand Prix series, finishing 5th at the event in Slovakia. She then missed much of the season due to injury, having developed a stress fracture in her right hip as a result of practicing too many triple loops. She came back to compete at the senior 2007 Finnish Championships, where she won the silver medal. She won the senior silver medal at the 2007 Nordic Championships. She competed at the 2007 Junior Worlds, where she placed 7th.

=== 2007–2008 season ===
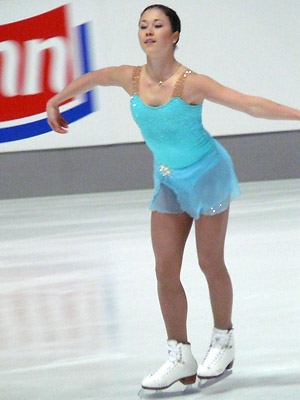
Lepistö during her short program at the 2007 Nebelhorn Trophy.

In the 2007–2008 season, Lepistö began competing entirely on the senior level. She won the bronze medal at the 2007 Nebelhorn Trophy and placed 4th at the 2007 Finlandia Trophy. She then debuted on the ISU Grand Prix of Figure Skating circuit. At her first event, the 2007 Skate Canada International, she won the short program but dropped to 7th overall after the free skate. She placed 5th in her second event, the 2007 NHK Trophy. Lepistö won the 2008 Finnish Championships and went on to the 2008 European Championships where, competing there for the first time, she won the bronze medal. She then placed 8th in her World Championship debut.

=== 2008–2009 season ===
Lepistö won the silver medals at the 2008 Nebelhorn Trophy and the 2008 Finlandia Trophy. She won the bronze medal at the 2008 Cup of China and was 5th at the 2008 NHK Trophy. At the 2009 Finnish Championships, she won the silver medal. She went on to the 2009 European Championships, where she won the title in front of her home crowd. She was the first Finn to win the ladies single's title, and second overall after Susanna Rahkamo / Petri Kokko's 1995 ice dancing title. It was also the first time Finns took two spots on the European podium as Susanna Pöykiö won bronze in the event.

Lepistö finished 6th in her second World Championship appearance.

=== 2009–2010 season ===
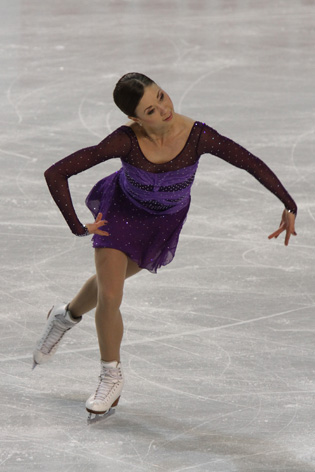
Lepistö at the 2010 European Championships.

Lepistö's assigned Grand Prix events were the 2009 NHK Trophy, where she again finished fifth, the 2009 Skate Canada International, where she received the bronze medal. She won back her national title, but was unable to defend her European title, finishing second behind Carolina Kostner. Lepisto finished 6th at the 2010 Winter Olympics in Vancouver, the best result by a Finnish lady at the event. In March 2010, she won the bronze medal at the World Championships in Turin, becoming the first Finnish ladies single skater to win a World Championship medal.

=== Injuries and retirement ===
For the 2010–11 Grand Prix season, Lepistö was assigned to Skate Canada and Skate America, but had to withdraw from both events due to an Achilles tendon injury. She also missed the European Championships but recovered in time to train for the 2011 World Championships. However, she suffered a back injury in early March, causing her to withdraw from the event. She said, "I fell on my lower back at full speed when the blades of my skates caught together. The heavy bump has led to a situation where my back has kept locking up." Lepistö was back in full training in June 2011 and landed a new sponsor, KPMG. She was assigned to 2011 Skate America and 2011 Trophee Eric Bompard for the Grand Prix season. However, by July when she was training in Toronto with Brian Orser, pain in her foot grew so severe she could not put on her skates. She said, "There is repeated stress to the same landing foot and this time one of the nerves in my foot was provoked and it became very painful." She was able to return to training in mid-August with a pair of custom-made skates, but her injury problems continued. Lepistö withdrew from both Grand Prix events. In November, she said she was unable to wear skates for more than 15 minutes due to the nerve problem and would miss the entire season to allow her leg to heal fully.

Lepistö was invited by Champions on Ice to skate in the 21st annual Paektusan Festival in North Korea in February 2012 which was used to honor the memory of Kim Jong-il. After receiving permission from Finland's Ministry of Education and Culture, she performed in the event, along with other elite skaters, but later issued an apology.

On 25 March 2012, Lepistö announced her decision to retire from competitive skating, stating that she no longer felt the same passion for skating as she had in the past. She has worked for the Finnish Olympic Committee, co-founded a sports marketing and athlete management company (Snou Creative), and became an ambassador and TV commentator for the 2017 World Championships in Helsinki, Finland.

== Programs ==
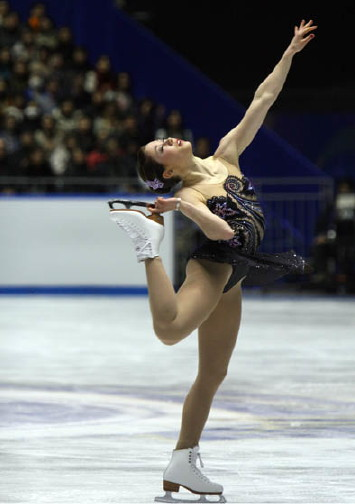
Lepistö performs a catch foot layback spin at the 2008 NHK Trophy.

=== Post–2012 ===
Season	Free skating Pro-am events
2014–2015	Lohtu - Live Aid Uusi Lastensairaala 2017
2013–2014	Suru on kunniavieras by Jenni Vartiainen; All I Want for Christmas Is You by Mariah Carey
2012–2013	Malaguena (fandangos)

=== Pre–2012 ===
Season	Short program	Free skating	Exhibition
2011–2012	Bésame Mucho by Consuelo Velazquez	Miss Saigon Rhapsody by Claude-Michel Schönberg choreo. by Maria McLean	Memory by Edvin Marton; Doctor Zhivago by Maurice Jarre
2010–2011	Did not compete		Jupiter by Ayaka Hirahara
2009–2010	Imagined Oceans by Karl Jenkins	Adiós Nonino; Fuga y Misterio by Astor Piazzolla performed by Gary Burton	I Want To Spend My Lifetime Loving You (from The Mask of Zorro) by James Horner performed by Marc Anthony, Tina Arena
2008–2009	Imagined Oceans by Karl Jenkins	Don Juan DeMarco by Michael Kamen	Ballad (from 'Klaani') by Päivi Portaankorva
2007–2008	The Legend of 1900 by Ennio Morricone	Don Juan DeMarco by Michael Kamen	I Believe by Fantasia Barrino
2006–2007	The Legend of 1900 by Ennio Morricone	The Feeling Begins by Peter Gabriel; Lost City by Henri Seroka; Harem by Sarah Brightman	
2005–2006	Invierno Porteño by Astor Piazzolla	The Feeling Begins by Peter Gabriel; Lost City by Henri Seroka; Harem by Sarah Brightman	
2004–2005	Invierno Porteño by Astor Piazzolla	Liberty by Luis Munoz; Redemption by Tonino Baliardo; Harem by Sarah Brightman	

== Competitive results ==
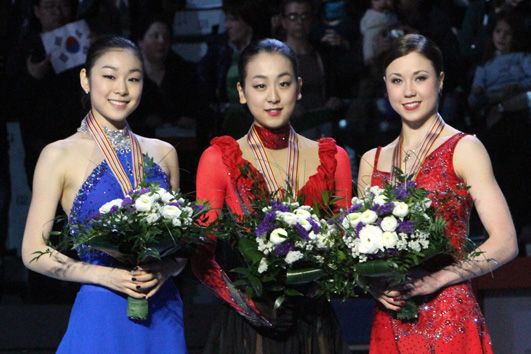
Lepistö (right) on the podium at the 2010 World Championships.

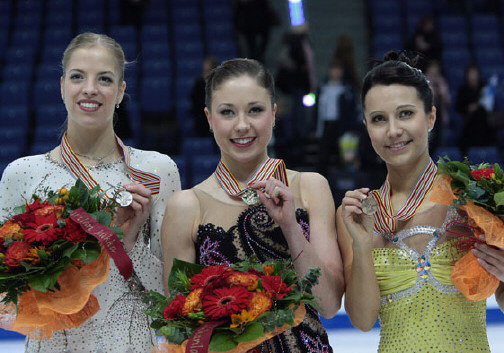
Lepistö (center) on the podium at the 2009 European Championships.

GP = Grand Prix; JGP = Junior Grand Prix

International
Event	02–03	03–04	04–05	05–06	06–07	07–08	08–09	09–10
Olympics								6th
Worlds						8th	6th	3rd
Europeans						3rd	1st	2nd
GP Cup of China							3rd	
GP NHK Trophy						5th	5th	5th
GP Skate Canada						7th		3rd
Finlandia Trophy						4th	2nd	2nd
Nebelhorn Trophy						3rd	2nd	
Nordics						2nd		
International: Junior
Junior Worlds				9th	7th			
JGP Andorra				3rd				
JGP Bulgaria		12th		4th				
JGP Croatia		8th						
JGP Czech Rep.					5th			
JGP Romania			9th					
JGP Serbia			1st					
Gardena	2nd J							
Nordics		3rd J	2nd J	2nd J	2nd J			
Warsaw Cup	1st J			1st J				
National
Finnish Champ.	1st J	5th J	1st J	4th	2nd	1st	2nd	1st
Team events
Japan Open								1st T 2nd P
J = Junior level T = Team result; P = Personal result; Medals awarded for team result only.

Pro-am events
Event	2012–13	2014–15
Medal Winners Open	5th	4th
