= Laura Magitteri =

Italian former pair skater (born 1988)

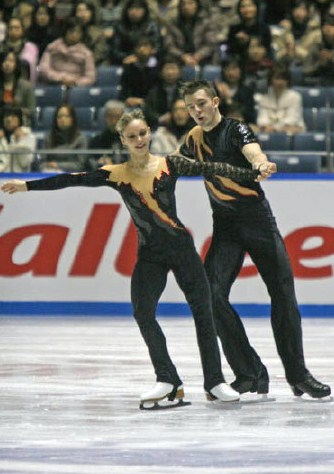
- Magitteri and Hotárek at the 2008 NHK Trophy

Personal information
- Born: 30 December 1988 (age 37) Como, Italy
- Height: 1.55 m (5 ft 1 in)

Figure skating career
- Country: Italy
- Skating club: Sesto Ice Skate
- Began skating: 1999

Medal record
Italian Championships
Gold medal – first place	2007 Trento	Pairs
Gold medal – first place	2008 Milan	Pairs
Bronze medal – third place	2009 Pinerolo	Pairs

Laura Magitteri (born 30 December 1988) is an Italian former pair skater. She teamed up with Ondřej Hotárek in January 2006. Two-time (2007–08) Italian national champions, they placed as high as ninth at the European Championships (2007), 13th at the World Championships (2008), and competed at three Grand Prix events. Their partnership ended in January 2009.

== Competitive highlights ==
(with Hotárek)

Results
International
Event	2006–07	2007–08	2008–09
World Championships	16th	13th	
European Championships	9th	11th	
GP Cup of Russia		8th	
GP NHK Trophy			6th
GP Skate America		6th	
Cup of Nice	3rd		
Nebelhorn Trophy		WD	9th
National
Italian Championships	1st	1st	3rd
GP = Grand Prix; WD = Withdrew
