= 2009–10 ISU Grand Prix of Figure Skating =

- Type: Grand Prix
- Date: October 15 – December 6, 2009
- Season: 2009–10
- Previous: 2008–09 Grand Prix
- Next: 2010–11 Grand Prix

The 2009–10 ISU Grand Prix of Figure Skating was a series of senior-level international figure skating competitions in the 2009–10 season. The six invitational events took place in the fall of 2009, building to the Grand Prix Final. Skaters competed in the disciplines of men's singles, ladies singles, pair skating, and ice dancing on the senior level. At each event, skaters earned points based on their placement and the top six in each discipline at the end of the series qualified for the 2009–10 Grand Prix of Figure Skating Final, held in Tokyo, Japan.

The Grand Prix series set the stage for the 2010 European Figure Skating Championships, the 2010 Four Continents Figure Skating Championships, the 2009 World Figure Skating Championships, and the 2010 Winter Olympics, as well as each country's national championships. The Grand Prix series began on October 15, 2009, and ended on December 6, 2009.

The Grand Prix was organized by the International Skating Union. Skaters competed for prize money and for a chance to compete in the Grand Prix Final. The corresponding series for Junior-level skaters was the 2009–10 ISU Junior Grand Prix.

== Qualifying ==
Skaters who reached the age of 14 by July 1, 2009, were eligible to compete on the senior Grand Prix circuit. The top six skaters/teams from the 2009 World Figure Skating Championships were seeded and were guaranteed two events. Skaters/teams who placed 7th through 12th will also given two events, though they were not considered seeded.

Skaters and teams who were ranked in the top 24 in the world at the end of the 2008-2009 season and those who had an ISU personal best in the top-24 on the season's best list for the 2008–09 season were also guaranteed one event.

Skaters/teams who medaled at the 2008–09 JGP Final or the 2009 World Junior Figure Skating Championships were guaranteed one event. Skaters who medaled at both the Junior Grand Prix Final and the World Junior Championships were guaranteed only one event.

The host country was allowed to send three skaters/teams of their choosing from their country in each discipline.

The spots remaining were filled from the top 75 skaters/teams in the 2008–09 season's best list. Skaters could not be given a Grand Prix invitation without having been on the season's best list, with the following exceptions:

1. The host country could select any three of their own skaters for an invitation.
2. Pairs and dance teams who had in either the 2007-08 or 2008–09 season qualified for Grand Prix spots by World Championships placement or had held a world ranking or season's best ranking in the top 24 with a previous partner could be considered for an alternate spot with their new partner.
3. Skaters and teams who had previously been seeded (1st through 6th at the World Championships) and had not competed in prior seasons either through injury or no fault of their own could be considered for one or two Grand Prix assignments if they chose to return to competitive skating.

=== Assignments and withdrawals ===
Sasha Cohen withdrew from the Trophée Eric Bompard due to tendinitis in her right calf. She also withdrew from Skate America and was replaced by Emily Hughes. Kimmie Meissner withdrew from the Rostelecom Cup and NHK Trophy due to a right knee injury.

== Schedule ==
| Date | Event | Location |
|---|---|---|
| October 15–18 | 2009 Trophée Eric Bompard | Paris, France |
| October 22–25 | 2009 Rostelecom Cup | Moscow, Russia |
| Oct. 29 – Nov. 1 | 2009 Cup of China | Beijing, China |
| November 5–8 | 2009 NHK Trophy | Nagano, Japan |
| November 12–15 | 2009 Skate America | Lake Placid, New York, United States |
| November 19–22 | 2009 Skate Canada International | Kitchener, Ontario, Canada |
| December 3–6 | 2009–10 Grand Prix Final | Tokyo, Japan |

== Medal summary ==
| Event | Date | Discipline | Gold | Silver | Bronze |
|---|---|---|---|---|---|
| (France) Trophée Eric Bompard | October 17 | Men | (Japan) Nobunari Oda | (Czech Republic) Tomáš Verner | (United States) Adam Rippon |
| (France) Trophée Eric Bompard | October 17 | Pairs | (Russia) Maria Mukhortova / Maxim Trankov | (Canada) Jessica Dubé / Bryce Davison | (Germany) Aliona Savchenko / Robin Szolkowy |
| (France) Trophée Eric Bompard | October 17 | Ladies | (South Korea) Kim Yuna | (Japan) Mao Asada | (Japan) Yukari Nakano |
| (France) Trophée Eric Bompard | October 17 | Ice dancing | (Canada) Tessa Virtue / Scott Moir | (France) Nathalie Péchalat / Fabian Bourzat | (United Kingdom) Sinead Kerr / John Kerr |

| Event | Date | Discipline | Gold | Silver | Bronze |
|---|---|---|---|---|---|
| (Russia) Rostelecom Cup | October 24 | Men | (Russia) Evgeni Plushenko | (Japan) Takahiko Kozuka | (Russia) Artem Borodulin |
| (Russia) Rostelecom Cup | October 24 | Pairs | (China) Pang Qing / Tong Jian | (Russia) Yuko Kavaguti / Alexander Smirnov | (United States) Keauna McLaughlin / Rockne Brubaker |
| (Russia) Rostelecom Cup | October 24 | Ice dancing | (United States) Meryl Davis / Charlie White | (Italy) Anna Cappellini / Luca Lanotte | (Russia) Ekaterina Rubleva / Ivan Shefer |
| (Russia) Rostelecom Cup | October 24 | Ladies | (Japan) Miki Ando | (United States) Ashley Wagner | (Russia) Alena Leonova |

| Event | Date | Discipline | Gold | Silver | Bronze |
|---|---|---|---|---|---|
| Cup of China | October 31 | Ladies | (Japan) Akiko Suzuki | (Finland) Kiira Korpi | (Canada) Joannie Rochette |
| Cup of China | October 31 | Men | (Japan) Nobunari Oda | (United States) Evan Lysacek | (Russia) Sergei Voronov |
| Cup of China | October 31 | Pairs | (China) Shen Xue / Zhao Hongbo | (China) Zhang Dan / Zhang Hao | (Ukraine) Tatiana Volosozhar / Stanislav Morozov |
| Cup of China | October 31 | Ice dancing | (United States) Tanith Belbin / Benjamin Agosto | (Russia) Jana Khokhlova / Sergei Novitski | (Italy) Federica Faiella / Massimo Scali |

| Event | Date | Discipline | Gold | Silver | Bronze |
|---|---|---|---|---|---|
| (Japan) NHK Trophy | November 7 | Pairs | (China) Pang Qing / Tong Jian | (Russia) Yuko Kavaguti / Alexander Smirnov | (United States) Rena Inoue / John Baldwin |
| (Japan) NHK Trophy | November 7 | Men | (France) Brian Joubert | (United States) Johnny Weir | (Czech Republic) Michal Březina |
| (Japan) NHK Trophy | November 7 | Ladies | (Japan) Miki Ando | (Russia) Alena Leonova | (United States) Ashley Wagner |
| (Japan) NHK Trophy | November 8 | Ice dancing | (United States) Meryl Davis / Charlie White | (United Kingdom) Sinead Kerr / John Kerr | (Canada) Vanessa Crone / Paul Poirier |

| Event | Date | Discipline | Gold | Silver | Bronze |
|---|---|---|---|---|---|
| (United States) Skate America | November 14 | Pairs | (China) Shen Xue / Zhao Hongbo | (Ukraine) Tatiana Volosozhar / Stanislav Morozov | (China) Zhang Dan / Zhang Hao |
| (United States) Skate America | November 14 | Men | (United States) Evan Lysacek | (Canada) Shawn Sawyer | (United States) Ryan Bradley |
| (United States) Skate America | November 15 | Ladies | (South Korea) Kim Yuna | (United States) Rachael Flatt | (Hungary) Júlia Sebestyén |
| (United States) Skate America | November 15 | Ice dancing | (United States) Tanith Belbin / Benjamin Agosto | (Italy) Anna Cappellini / Luca Lanotte | (Israel) Alexandra Zaretski / Roman Zaretski |

| Event | Date | Discipline | Gold | Silver | Bronze |
|---|---|---|---|---|---|
| Skate Canada International | November 21 | Pairs | (Germany) Aliona Savchenko & Robin Szolkowy | (Russia) Maria Mukhortova & Maxim Trankov | (Canada) Jessica Dubé & Bryce Davison |
| Skate Canada International | November 21 | Men | (United States) Jeremy Abbott | (Japan) Daisuke Takahashi | (France) Alban Préaubert |
| Skate Canada International | November 21 | Ladies | (Canada) Joannie Rochette | (United States) Alissa Czisny | (Finland) Laura Lepistö |
| Skate Canada International | November 22 | Ice dancing | (Canada) Tessa Virtue / Scott Moir | (France) Nathalie Péchalat / Fabian Bourzat | (Canada) Kaitlyn Weaver / Andrew Poje |

| Event | Date | Discipline | Gold | Silver | Bronze |
|---|---|---|---|---|---|
| Grand Prix Final | December 4 | Ice dancing | (United States) Meryl Davis / Charlie White | (Canada) Tessa Virtue / Scott Moir | (France) Nathalie Péchalat / Fabian Bourzat |
| Grand Prix Final | December 5 | Pairs | (China) Shen Xue / Zhao Hongbo | (China) Pang Qing / Tong Jian | (Germany) Aliona Savchenko / Robin Szolkowy |
| Grand Prix Final | December 5 | Men | (United States) Evan Lysacek | (Japan) Nobunari Oda | (United States) Johnny Weir |
| Grand Prix Final | December 5 | Ladies | (South Korea) Kim Yuna | (Japan) Miki Ando | (Japan) Akiko Suzuki |

== Medal standings ==
| Rank | Nation | Gold | Silver | Bronze | Total |
|---|---|---|---|---|---|
| 1 | United States | 8 | 5 | 6 | 19 |
| 2 | Japan | 5 | 5 | 2 | 12 |
| 3 | China | 5 | 2 | 1 | 8 |
| 4 | Canada | 3 | 3 | 4 | 10 |
| 5 | South Korea | 3 | 0 | 0 | 3 |
| 6 | Russia | 2 | 5 | 4 | 11 |
| 7 | France | 1 | 2 | 2 | 5 |
| 8 | Germany | 1 | 0 | 2 | 3 |
| 9 | Italy | 0 | 2 | 1 | 3 |
| 10 | Czech Republic | 0 | 1 | 1 | 2 |
| 10 | Finland | 0 | 1 | 1 | 2 |
| 10 | Great Britain | 0 | 1 | 1 | 2 |
| 10 | Ukraine | 0 | 1 | 1 | 2 |
| 14 | Hungary | 0 | 0 | 1 | 1 |
| 14 | Israel | 0 | 0 | 1 | 1 |
| Totals (15 entries) | | 28 | 28 | 28 | 84 |

== Grand Prix Final qualification points ==
After the final event, the 2009 Skate Canada International, the six skaters/teams with the most points advanced to the Grand Prix Final. The point system was as follows:

| Placement | Points (Singles/Dance) | Points (Pairs) |
|---|---|---|
| 1st Place | 15 Points | 15 Points |
| 2nd Place | 13 Points | 13 Points |
| 3rd Place | 11 Points | 11 Points |
| 4th Place | 9 Points | 9 Points |
| 5th Place | 7 Points | 7 Points |
| 6th Place | 5 Points | 5 Points |
| 7th Place | 4 Points | |
| 8th Place | 3 Points | |

There were 7 tie-breakers in cases of a tie in overall points:

1. Highest placement at an event. If a skater placed 1st and 3rd, the tiebreaker is the 1st place, and that beats a skater who placed 2nd in both events.
2. Highest combined total scores in both events. If a skater earned 200 points at one event and 250 at a second, that skater would win in the second tie-break over a skater who earned 200 points at one event and 150 at another.
3. Participated in two events.
4. Highest combined scores in the free skating/free dancing portion of both events.
5. Highest individual score in the free skating/free dancing portion from one event.
6. Highest combined scores in the short program/original dance of both events.
7. Highest number of total participants at the events.

If there is still a tie, the tie is considered unbreakable and the tied skaters all qualify for the Grand Prix Final.

=== Final standings ===
Skaters in bold qualified for the Grand Prix Final.

| Points | Men | Ladies | Pairs | Ice dance |
|---|---|---|---|---|
| 30 | (Japan) **Nobunari Oda** | (South Korea) **Kim Yuna** (Japan) **Miki Ando** | (China) **Shen Xue / Zhao Hongbo** (China) **Pang Qing / Tong Jian** | (United States) **Meryl Davis / Charlie White** (Canada) **Tessa Virtue / Scott Moir** (United States) Tanith Belbin / Benjamin Agosto (withdrew) |
| 28 | (United States) **Evan Lysacek** | | (Russia) **Maria Mukhortova / Maxim Trankov** | |
| 26 | | (Canada) **Joannie Rochette** | (Germany) **Aliona Savchenko / Robin Szolkowy** (Russia) **Yuko Kavaguti / Alexander Smirnov** | (France) **Nathalie Péchalat / Fabian Bourzat** (Italy) **Anna Cappellini / Luca Lanotte** |
| 24 | (France) Brian Joubert (withdrew) | (Russia) **Alena Leonova** (United States) **Ashley Wagner** | (China) **Zhang Dan / Zhang Hao** (Canada) Jessica Dubé / Bryce Davison (Ukraine) Tatiana Volosozhar / Stanislav Morozov | (United Kingdom) **Sinead Kerr / John Kerr** |
| 22 | (United States) **Jeremy Abbott** (Japan) **Daisuke Takahashi** (United States) **Johnny Weir** | (Japan) **Akiko Suzuki** (United States) Rachael Flatt (United States) Alissa Czisny | | (Russia) Jana Khokhlova / Sergei Novitski (called up, but withdrew) |
| 20 | (Czech Republic) **Tomáš Verner** (called up) (Czech Republic) Michal Březina | (Japan) Mao Asada (Japan) Yukari Nakano | (United States) Keauna McLaughlin / Rockne Brubaker (United States) Rena Inoue / John Baldwin | (Canada) **Vanessa Crone / Paul Poirier** (called up) |
| 19 | | | | |
| 18 | | (Finland) Laura Lepistö | | (Israel) Alexandra Zaretski / Roman Zaretski (Russia) Ekaterina Rubleva / Ivan Shefer (Russia) Ekaterina Bobrova / Dmitri Soloviev |
| 17 | (Japan) Takahiko Kozuka | | | |
| 16 | (Canada) Shawn Sawyer (Russia) Sergei Voronov (United States) Adam Rippon (Italy) Samuel Contesti | (Finland) Kiira Korpi (Hungary) Júlia Sebestyén (United States) Mirai Nagasu | (United States) Caydee Denney / Jeremy Barrett | (Canada) Kaitlyn Weaver / Andrew Poje (United States) Emily Samuelson / Evan Bates |
| 15 | (Russia) Evgeni Plushenko (France) Alban Préaubert | | | |
| 14 | (Russia) Artem Borodulin (France) Yannick Ponsero | | | (Ukraine) Anna Zadorozhniuk / Sergei Verbillo |
| 13 | | (Japan) Fumie Suguri | | |
| 12 | | (United States) Caroline Zhang | (Canada) Mylène Brodeur / John Mattatall | (United States) Kimberly Navarro / Brent Bommentre |
| 11 | (United States) Ryan Bradley | | | (Italy) Federica Faiella / Massimo Scali (China) Huang Xintong / Zheng Xun |
| 10 | | (Italy) Carolina Kostner | (China) Dong Huibo / Wu Yiming | |
| 9 | (France) Florent Amodio (Sweden) Adrian Schultheiss | (Georgia (country)) Elene Gedevanishvili (Canada) Amélie Lacoste (Canada) Cynthia Phaneuf | (Canada) Anabelle Langlois / Cody Hay (Canada) Meagan Duhamel / Craig Buntin (Russia) Vera Bazarova / Yuri Larionov | |
| 8 | (United States) Stephen Carriere (Canada) Kevin Reynolds | | | (United States) Madison Chock / Greg Zuerlein (United States) Madison Hubbell / Keiffer Hubbell (Russia) Kristina Gorshkova / Vitali Butikov |
| 7 | (Belgium) Kevin van der Perren (China) Yang Chao (United States) Brandon Mroz | (United States) Alexe Gilles (Estonia) Jelena Glebova | (United States) Amanda Evora / Mark Ladwig (Russia) Lubov Iliushechkina / Nodari Maisuradze (Italy) Nicole Della Monica / Yannick Kocon (France) Adeline Canac / Maximin Coia | (Russia) Anastasia Platonova / Alexander Grachev |
| 6 | | | | |
| 5 | (Canada) Patrick Chan | | (Canada) Kirsten Moore-Towers / Dylan Moscovitch (United States) Brooke Castile / Benjamin Okolski (Russia) Ksenia Krasilnikova / Konstantin Bezmaternikh | (Russia) Ekaterina Riazanova / Ilia Tkachenko |
| 4 | (Kazakhstan) Denis Ten | (China) Liu Yan (United States) Emily Hughes | | (Czech Republic) Lucie Myslivečková / Matěj Novák (Germany) Carolina Hermann / Daniel Hermann (Japan) Cathy Reed / Chris Reed |
| 3 | | (United Kingdom) Jenna McCorkell (Germany) Sarah Hecken (Germany) Annette Dytrt (Canada) Diane Szmiett | | (Lithuania) Katherine Copely / Deividas Stagniūnas (Canada) Allie Hann-McCurdy / Michael Coreno (Estonia) Caitlin Mallory / Kristjan Rand (Canada) Andrea Chong / Guillaume Gfeller |

== Prize money ==
The total prize money was $180,000 per individual event in the series and $272,000 for the Final. All amounts were in U.S. dollars. Pairs and dance teams split the money. The breakdown was as follows:

| Placement | Prize money (Series) | Prize money (Final) |
|---|---|---|
| 1st | $18,000 | $25,000 |
| 2nd | $13,000 | $18,000 |
| 3rd | $9,000 | $12,000 |
| 4th | $3,000 | $6,000 |
| 5th | $2,000 | $4,000 |
| 6th | - | $3,000 |
