= Shira Willner =

German former competitive figure skater (born 1993)

Shira Willer
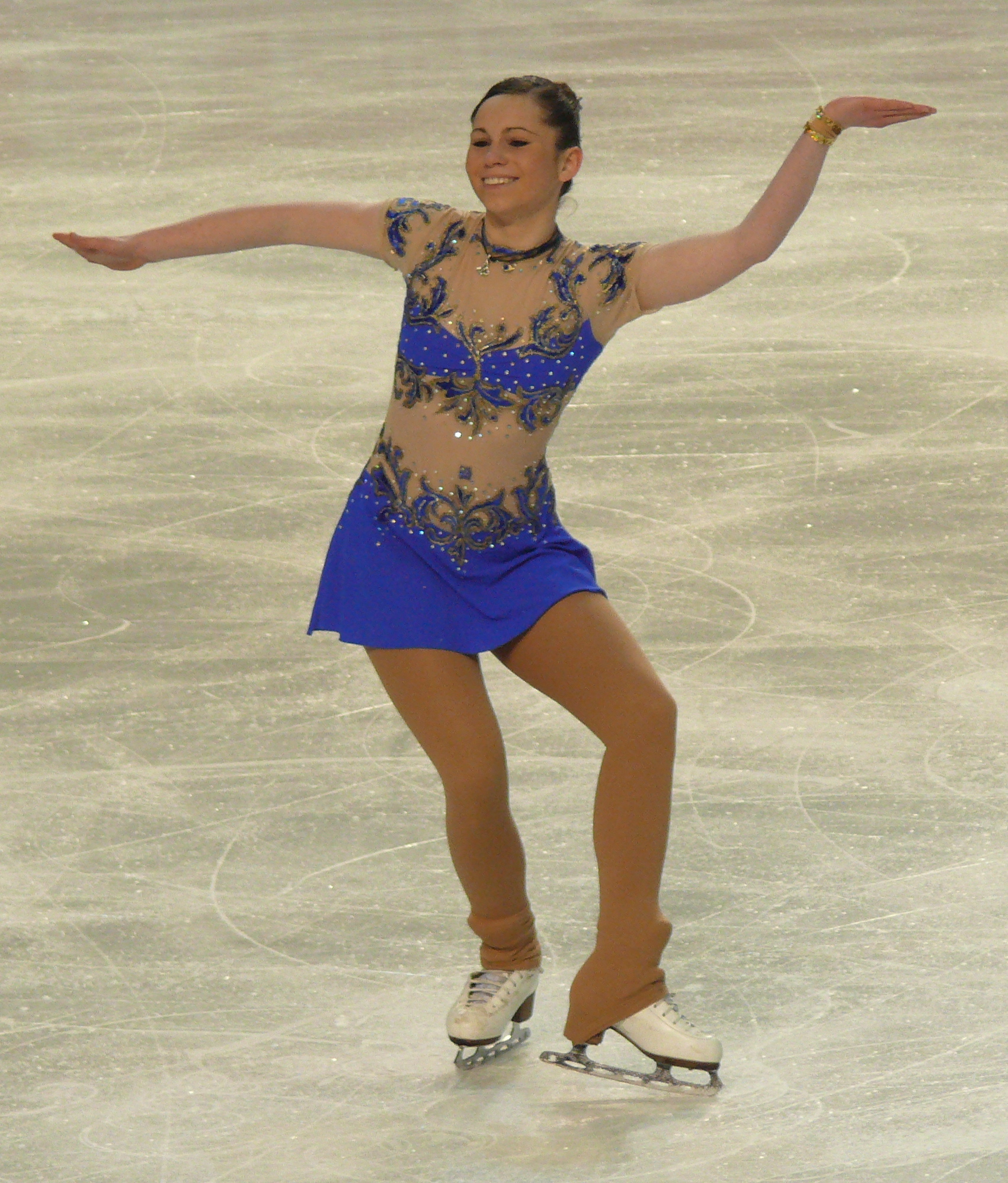
- Willner at the 2010 European Championships

Personal information
- Born: 22 January 1993 (age 33) Offenbach am Main, Germany
- Height: 1.61 m (5 ft 3 1/2 in)

Figure skating career
- Country: Germany
- Began skating: 2002
- Retired: 2011

Shira Willner (born 22 January 1993) is a German former competitive figure skater. She is the 2010 German national silver medalist and placed 24th at the 2010 European Championships.

Willner represented the Mannheimer ERC for most of her career. In the summer of 2009, she moved to Berlin to be coached by Romy Österreich and started representing SC Berlin on 1 January 2010. She last competed at the 2010 Ice Challenge.

== Programs ==
Season	Short program	Free skating
2009–2010	Harem by Sarah Brightman	Happy Valley performed by Vanessa-Mae

== Competitive highlights ==
JGP: Junior Grand Prix

International
Event	2007–08	2008–09	2009–10	2010–11
European Champ.			24th	
NRW Trophy			7th	
International: Junior or novice
JGP Croatia			7th	
JGP Hungary			7th	
Heiko Fischer Pokal		1st J.		
Ice Challenge				4th J.
Bavarian Open	2nd N.			
National
German Champ.	3rd N.	6th J.	2nd	
Levels: N. = Novice, J. = Junior
