= 2009 Skate America =

- Type: Grand Prix
- Date: November 12 – 15
- Season: 2009–10
- Location: Lake Placid, New York
- Host: U.S. Figure Skating
- Venue: Herb Brooks Arena

Champions
- Men's singles: (United States) Evan Lysacek
- Ladies' singles: (South Korea) Kim Yuna
- Pairs: (China) Shen Xue / Zhao Hongbo
- Ice dance: (United States) Tanith Belbin / Benjamin Agosto
- Previous: 2008 Skate America
- Next: 2010 Skate America
- Previous Grand Prix: 2009 NHK Trophy
- Next Grand Prix: 2009 Skate Canada International

The 2009 Skate America was the fifth event of six in the 2009–10 ISU Grand Prix of Figure Skating, a senior-level international invitational competition series. It was held at the Herb Brooks Arena in Lake Placid, New York, on 12–15 November. Medals were awarded in the disciplines of men's singles, ladies' singles, pair skating, and ice dancing. Skaters earned points toward qualifying for the 2009–10 Grand Prix Final. The compulsory dance was the Golden Waltz.

The title sponsor was Cancer.Net.

== Schedule ==
All times are Eastern Standard Time (UTC-5).

- Friday, 13 November
  - 15:00 – Ice dancing: Compulsory dance
  - 19:30 – Pairs: Short program
  - 21:00 – Men: Short program
- Saturday, 14 November
  - 14:00 – Ice dancing: Original dance
  - 15:55 – Pairs: Free skating
  - 19:00 – Ladies: Short program
  - 20:57 – Men: Free skating
- Sunday, 15 November
  - 14:00 – Ladies: Free skating
  - 16:27 – Ice dancing: Free dance

== Results ==
=== Men ===
Rank	Name	Nation	Total points	SP		FS	
1	Evan Lysacek	United States	237.72	1	79.17	1	158.55
2	Shawn Sawyer	Canada	203.91	5	65.95	4	137.96
3	Ryan Bradley	United States	198.12	8	59.24	2	138.88
4	Florent Amodio	France	197.58	2	72.65	6	124.93
5	Tomáš Verner	Czech Republic	194.06	11	55.90	3	138.16
6	Kevin Reynolds	Canada	190.23	10	59.05	5	131.18
7	Adrian Schultheiss	Sweden	185.07	4	67.55	7	117.52
8	Brandon Mroz	United States	174.00	3	71.40	11	102.60
9	Yasuharu Nanri	Japan	168.84	7	59.35	8	109.49
10	Andrei Lutai	Russia	167.79	6	60.64	9	107.15
11	Wu Jialiang	China	164.26	9	59.16	10	105.10
12	Igor Macypura	Slovakia	144.02	12	51.45	12	92.57

=== Ladies ===
- In the short program, Kim Yuna set an ISU World Record of 76.28 points.

Rank	Name	Nation	Total points	SP		FS	
1	Kim Yuna	South Korea	187.98	1	76.28	2	111.70
2	Rachael Flatt	United States	174.91	2	58.80	1	116.11
3	Júlia Sebestyén	Hungary	159.03	3	58.54	3	100.49
4	Fumie Suguri	Japan	148.99	4	56.04	5	92.95
5	Jelena Glebova	Estonia	148.71	5	52.28	4	96.43
6	Elene Gedevanishvili	Georgia	144.19	6	52.18	6	92.01
7	Emily Hughes	United States	135.31	11	45.32	7	89.99
8	Sarah Hecken	Germany	131.10	12	43.86	8	87.24
9	Joshi Helgesson	Sweden	129.91	7	51.32	10	78.59
10	Alexe Gilles	United States	129.01	10	46.56	9	82.45
11	Susanna Pöykiö	Finland	124.22	9	46.72	11	77.50
12	Tuğba Karademir	Turkey	122.40	8	49.42	12	72.98

=== Pairs ===
- In the short program, Shen Xue / Zhao Hongbo tied the ISU World Record of 74.36 points.

Rank	Name	Nation	Total points	SP		FS	
1	Shen Xue / Zhao Hongbo	China	201.40	1	74.36	1	127.04
2	Tatiana Volosozhar / Stanislav Morozov	Ukraine	171.82	2	61.70	3	110.12
3	Zhang Dan / Zhang Hao	China	168.19	5	56.84	2	111.35
4	Keauna McLaughlin / Rockne Brubaker	United States	165.37	4	58.54	4	106.83
5	Amanda Evora / Mark Ladwig	United States	148.33	6	50.14	5	98.19
6	Brooke Castile / Benjamin Okolski	United States	139.58	7	49.52	6	90.06
7	Stacey Kemp / David King	United Kingdom	130.80	8	43.46	7	87.34
WD	Meagan Duhamel / Craig Buntin	Canada		3	59.64		

- WD = Withdrawn

=== Ice dancing ===
Rank	Name	Nation	Total points	CD		OD		FD	
1	Tanith Belbin / Benjamin Agosto	United States	195.85	1	39.28	1	60.95	1	95.62
2	Anna Cappellini / Luca Lanotte	Italy	171.86	3	32.04	2	54.09	3	85.73
3	Alexandra Zaretski / Roman Zaretski	Israel	171.77	4	31.93	3	51.90	2	87.94
4	Jana Khokhlova / Sergei Novitski	Russia	168.25	2	36.94	5	49.53	4	81.78
5	Kimberly Navarro / Brent Bommentre	United States	160.89	5	30.19	4	51.28	6	79.42
6	Madison Chock / Greg Zuerlein	United States	153.92	7	28.88	8	44.55	5	80.49
7	Kristina Gorshkova / Vitali Butikov	Russia	152.43	6	29.32	6	46.64	7	76.47
8	Caitlin Mallory / Kristjan Rand	Estonia	143.50	9	26.89	7	44.58	9	72.03
9	Zoé Blanc / Pierre-Loup Bouquet	France	140.71	10	24.39	10	42.66	8	73.66
10	Yu Xiaoyang / Wang Chen	China	135.62	8	27.43	9	44.15	10	64.04
