= 2009 Skate Canada International =

- Type: Grand Prix
- Date: November 19 – 22
- Season: 2009–10
- Location: Kitchener, Ontario
- Host: Skate Canada
- Venue: Kitchener Memorial Auditorium Complex

Champions
- Men's singles: (United States) Jeremy Abbott
- Ladies' singles: (Canada) Joannie Rochette
- Pairs: (Germany) Aliona Savchenko / Robin Szolkowy
- Ice dance: (Canada) Tessa Virtue / Scott Moir
- Previous: 2008 Skate Canada International
- Next: 2010 Skate Canada International
- Previous Grand Prix: 2009 Skate America
- Next Grand Prix: 2009–10 Grand Prix Final

The 2009 Skate Canada International was the final event of six in the 2009–10 ISU Grand Prix of Figure Skating, a senior-level international invitational competition series. It was held at the Kitchener Memorial Auditorium Complex in Kitchener, Ontario on November 19–22. Medals were awarded in the disciplines of men's singles, ladies' singles, pair skating, and ice dancing. Skaters earned points toward qualifying for the 2009–10 Grand Prix Final. The compulsory dance was the Tango Romantica.

== Schedule ==
All times are Eastern Standard Time (UTC-5).

- Friday, November 20
  - 11:50 - Pairs: Short program
  - 13:20 - Ladies: Short program
  - 18:30 - Ice dancing: Compulsory dance
  - 19:55 - Men: Short program
- Saturday, November 21
  - 12:00 - Ice dancing: Original dance
  - 13:30 - Pairs: Free skating
  - 16:00 - Men: Free skating
  - 19:00 - Ladies: Free skating
- Sunday, November 22
  - 12:15 - Ice dancing: Free dance

== Results ==
=== Men ===
| Rank | Name | Nation | Total points | SP | | FS | |
|---|---|---|---|---|---|---|---|
| 1 | Jeremy Abbott | United States | 232.99 | 1 | 79.00 | 2 | 153.99 |
| 2 | Daisuke Takahashi | Japan | 231.31 | 2 | 76.30 | 1 | 155.01 |
| 3 | Alban Préaubert | France | 212.28 | 4 | 72.30 | 3 | 139.98 |
| 4 | Michal Březina | Czech Republic | 202.32 | 5 | 71.92 | 5 | 130.40 |
| 5 | Samuel Contesti | Italy | 202.25 | 7 | 67.30 | 4 | 134.95 |
| 6 | Patrick Chan | Canada | 198.77 | 6 | 68.64 | 6 | 130.13 |
| 7 | Denis Ten | Kazakhstan | 193.33 | 3 | 75.45 | 9 | 117.88 |
| 8 | Stephen Carriere | United States | 188.31 | 10 | 59.40 | 7 | 128.91 |
| 9 | Armin Mahbanoozadeh | United States | 186.48 | 8 | 65.30 | 8 | 121.18 |
| 10 | Joey Russell | Canada | 168.71 | 9 | 61.82 | 11 | 106.89 |
| 11 | Kevin van der Perren | Belgium | 168.54 | 11 | 58.86 | 10 | 109.68 |
| 12 | Jeremy Ten | Canada | 148.96 | 12 | 45.14 | 12 | 103.82 |

=== Ladies ===
| Rank | Name | Nation | Total points | SP | | FS | |
|---|---|---|---|---|---|---|---|
| 1 | Joannie Rochette | Canada | 182.90 | 1 | 70.00 | 1 | 112.90 |
| 2 | Alissa Czisny | United States | 163.53 | 2 | 63.52 | 4 | 100.01 |
| 3 | Laura Lepistö | Finland | 158.52 | 4 | 55.74 | 2 | 102.78 |
| 4 | Mirai Nagasu | United States | 156.83 | 3 | 56.34 | 3 | 100.49 |
| 5 | Akiko Suzuki | Japan | 147.72 | 8 | 53.10 | 5 | 94.62 |
| 6 | Amélie Lacoste | Canada | 141.13 | 6 | 55.10 | 6 | 86.03 |
| 7 | Cynthia Phaneuf | Canada | 132.48 | 5 | 55.58 | 9 | 76.90 |
| 8 | Caroline Zhang | United States | 132.46 | 7 | 54.58 | 8 | 77.88 |
| 9 | Sarah Hecken | Germany | 124.40 | 10 | 45.50 | 7 | 78.90 |
| 10 | Jenna McCorkell | United Kingdom | 123.50 | 9 | 47.48 | 10 | 76.02 |
| 11 | Joshi Helgesson | Sweden | 108.41 | 11 | 40.48 | 11 | 67.93 |

=== Pairs ===
Aliona Savchenko / Robin Szolkowy set a new world record of 206.71 points under the ISU Judging System for pairs combined total score.

| Rank | Name | Nation | Total points | SP | | FS | |
|---|---|---|---|---|---|---|---|
| 1 | Aliona Savchenko / Robin Szolkowy | Germany | 206.71 | 1 | 74.16 | 1 | 132.55 |
| 2 | Maria Mukhortova / Maxim Trankov | Russia | 185.71 | 2 | 65.80 | 2 | 119.91 |
| 3 | Jessica Dubé / Bryce Davison | Canada | 166.93 | 3 | 57.90 | 3 | 109.03 |
| 4 | Anabelle Langlois / Cody Hay | Canada | 159.95 | 4 | 55.52 | 4 | 104.43 |
| 5 | Caydee Denney / Jeremy Barrett | United States | 157.09 | 5 | 55.46 | 5 | 101.63 |
| 6 | Kirsten Moore-Towers / Dylan Moscovitch | Canada | 146.91 | 7 | 51.14 | 6 | 95.77 |
| 7 | Caitlin Yankowskas / John Coughlin | United States | 143.61 | 6 | 52.42 | 7 | 91.19 |
| 8 | Ksenia Ozerova / Alexander Enbert | Russia | 113.36 | 8 | 40.28 | 8 | 73.08 |

=== Ice dancing ===
| Rank | Name | Nation | Total points | CD | | OD | | FD | |
|---|---|---|---|---|---|---|---|---|---|
| 1 | Tessa Virtue / Scott Moir | Canada | 204.38 | 1 | 40.69 | 1 | 60.57 | 1 | 103.12 |
| 2 | Nathalie Péchalat / Fabian Bourzat | France | 185.07 | 2 | 35.55 | 2 | 56.05 | 2 | 93.47 |
| 3 | Kaitlyn Weaver / Andrew Poje | Canada | 165.64 | 3 | 32.18 | 4 | 51.18 | 4 | 82.28 |
| 4 | Ekaterina Bobrova / Dmitri Soloviev | Russia | 161.68 | 5 | 30.09 | 5 | 45.92 | 3 | 85.67 |
| 5 | Emily Samuelson / Evan Bates | United States | 160.76 | 4 | 31.47 | 3 | 51.49 | 5 | 77.80 |
| 6 | Madison Hubbell / Keiffer Hubbell | United States | 141.63 | 6 | 27.14 | 6 | 44.49 | 7 | 70.00 |
| 7 | Carolina Hermann / Daniel Hermann | Germany | 141.61 | 7 | 25.29 | 7 | 42.78 | 6 | 73.54 |
| 8 | Andrea Chong / Guillaume Gfeller | Canada | 128.70 | 8 | 24.27 | 8 | 40.39 | 8 | 64.04 |
