= Alexandra Zaretsky =

Israeli retired ice dancer (born 1987)

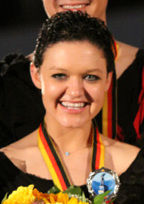
- Alexandra Zaretsky in 2009

Personal information
- Native name: אלכסנדרה זרצקי
- Full name: Alexandra Zaretsky
- Other names: Zaretski
- Born: December 23, 1987 (age 38) Minsk, Belarus SSR
- Height: 1.60 m (5 ft 3 in)

Figure skating career
- Country: Israel
- Partner: Roman Zaretsky
- Skating club: Kochavim on the Ice
- Began skating: 1994
- Retired: June 20, 2010

Alexandra "Sasha" Zaretsky (Hebrew: אלכסנדרה זרצקי, Russian: Александра Зарецкая, Alexandra Zaretskaya, Belarusian: Аляксандра Зарэцкая) (born December 23, 1987) is an Israeli retired ice dancer. With her brother Roman Zaretsky, she is the 2009 Skate America bronze medalist, 2009 Golden Spin of Zagreb champion, a three-time Nebelhorn Trophy medalist, and a three-time Israeli national champion. They finished as high as sixth at the World Championships and competed twice at the Winter Olympics, finishing tenth in 2010.

== Personal life ==
Alexandra Zaretsky was born on December 23, 1987, in Minsk, Belarus SSR, Soviet Union. The Zaretsky family was Jewish and made aliyah, settling in Metula, Israel, in 1990. Alexandra trained in rhythmic gymnastics as a young child before choosing skating. She speaks fluent Hebrew, Russian, and English. Her sons, Dennis and Adam, were born in Indiana, United States.

== Career ==
=== Early years ===
Alexandra Zaretsky began skating in Metula at the age of 6. She originally competed as a single skater, winning age group medals. When older brother Roman wanted to switch to ice dancing, his sister was the only girl at the rink he could partner, so their parents put them together. She was seven and he was 11 when they switched to ice dancing. They were coached by their mother until 2001, when they relocated for training to the United States.

The siblings debuted on the ISU Junior Grand Prix series in October 2001, placing 11th in The Hague, Netherlands. They placed 19th at the 2002 World Junior Championships in Hamar, Norway.

=== 2002–2003 season ===
In September 2002, the Zaretskys became the first Israeli figure skaters to medal on the ISU Junior Grand Prix series, taking bronze in Belgrade, Serbia. After winning another bronze, at a JGP event in Chemnitz, Germany, they were named the first alternates for a spot at the JGP Final. In January 2003, the siblings became the first Israelis to medal at the European Youth Olympic Festival. They went on to finish eighth at the 2003 World Junior Championships in Ostrava, Czech Republic. They were coached by Irina Romanova and Igor Yaroshenko in Wilmington, Delaware.

=== 2003–2004 season ===
Competing in their third JGP season, the Zaretskys won silver in Mexico City, Mexico, and then gold in Gdańsk, Poland. They qualified for the first time to the JGP Final, where they would finish sixth. They placed ninth at the 2004 World Junior Championships in The Hague, Netherlands.

=== 2004–2005 season ===
In their final JGP season, the Zaretskys took bronze in Chemnitz, Germany, and then silver in Miercurea Ciuc, Romania. In December, they placed eighth at the JGP Final in Helsinki, Finland. They decided to change coaches, switching to Evgeni Platov in January 2005. In March, they competed at the 2005 World Junior Championships in Kitchener, Ontario, Canada. Ranked third in the compulsory dance, fourth in the original dance, and fifth in the free dance, they finished fourth overall.

=== 2005–2006 season ===
The Zaretskys debuted on the senior Grand Prix series, placing 9th at both of their assignments. They were required to finish at least 15th at the 2006 European Championships in order to be sent to the Olympics as Israel's second team. They accomplished this and were sent to Torino, where they placed 22nd.

=== 2006–2007 season ===
In the summer of 2006, the Zaretskys briefly trained in Moscow because Platov was taking part in a skating reality show and then returned to the U.S. with Platov. Following Galit Chait / Sergei Sakhnovski's retirement at the end of the previous season, the siblings became the top Israeli ice dancing team. They won the bronze medal at the 2006 Nebelhorn Trophy, a senior "B" international, and finished just off the podium at the 2006 Cup of China. They finished 11th at the 2007 Europeans and 14th at the 2007 World Championships. They were coached by Platov in Little Falls, New Jersey until the end of the season.

=== 2007–2008 season ===
They Zaretskys began their season with a new coaching team, having joined Galit Chait, Nikolai Morozov and Mathew Gates in Hackensack, New Jersey.

They competed at two Grand Prix events, 2007 Skate America and 2007 Cup of China, repeating their 4th-place finish in China. They finished 8th at the 2008 Europeans and 9th at the 2008 World Championships, setting a new personal best score.

=== 2008–2009 season ===
In October 2008, their coach Galit Chait filed a lawsuit against the Ice House training rink in Hackensack, New Jersey, alleging that rink officials discriminated against them on the basis of their Israeli nationality by denying them prime training time and threatening to ban them from the rink.

The siblings had an up and down season, winning their first international event, the 2009 Winter Universiade, but placing lower at both the 2009 Europeans and 2009 World Championships than they had the previous year.

=== 2009–2010 season ===
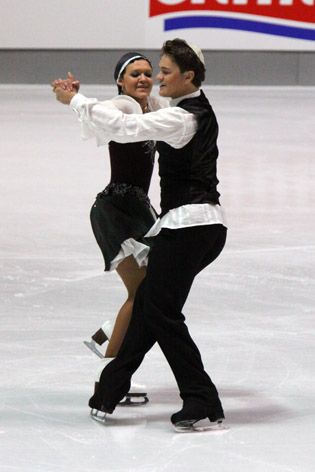
The Zaretskys perform their Hava Nagila original dance in 2009

The Zaretskys rebounded in their final competitive season. After a 5th-place finish at the 2009 Cup of China, the siblings won their first Grand Prix medal – bronze at the 2009 Skate America after placing fourth in the compulsory dance, third in the original dance, and second in the free dance. They were named third alternates for the Grand Prix Final. The Zaretskys won their next event, the 2009 Golden Spin of Zagreb, and skated to 7th place at the 2010 European Championships, their career-best result at that event.

Based on their top-ten finish at the Europeans, the Zaretskys met their national criterion for the 2010 Winter Olympics in Vancouver. There, in February 2010 they performed to music from Schindler's List in the free dance, having chosen the music in part to honor 27 family members who died in Minsk during the Holocaust. They finished tenth, setting new personal best scores in the free dance and overall. They went on to finish 6th at 2010 Worlds, again setting personal bests in the free dance and overall.

The Zaretskys announced their retirement from competitive skating on June 20, 2010, citing a lack of support from their federation as the reason.

=== Post-competitive career ===
The Zaretskys later performed in various ice shows, including Shall We Dance on Ice, and coached together for several years in Houston, Texas. In 2017, Alexandra relocated to Charlotte, North Carolina where she currently works as a coach.

== Programs ==
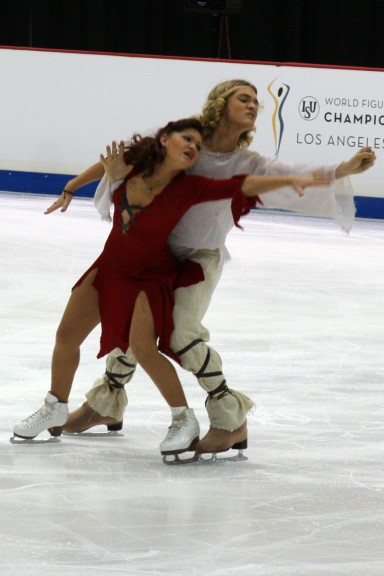
The Zaretskys perform at the 2009 Worlds

Season	Original dance	Free dance
2001–2002	Granada; Torero Quiero	The Ukraine by Dean Marshall
2002–2003	Waltz: Les Patineurs by Émile Waldteufel; Galop: St. Petersburger Sleigh Ride	Moulin Rouge! by José Feliciano
2003–2004	Blues: Bad to the Bone by George Thorogood; Rock'n Roll: Americano by Brian Setzer Orchestra	The House by Ben Walkins performed by Orchestra Juno Reactor Gocoo; Evrious Angel by Rob Dougan; Spybreak by Alex Gifford performed by the Propellerheads; The Matrix; The Matrix Reloaded by Don Davis
2004–2005	Foxtrot by Louis Armstrong; Quickstep	The Phantom of the Opera by Andrew Lloyd Webber
2005–2006	Samba; Rhumba; Mambo performed by Mambo Kings	Caravan
2006–2007	Assassin's Tango (from Mr. & Mrs. Smith (2005 film)) by John Powell	Carmina Burana by Carl Orff
2007–2008	Shick, Shack, Shock by Mustafa Sax	Let my People Go by Louis Armstrong; Sing, Sing, Sing by Louis Prima
2008–2009	Summertime by Louis Armstrong, Ella Fitzgerald; Lindy Hop: Are you hip to the jive by Cab Calloway; Swing: Sing, Sing, Sing by Louis Prima	Jesus Christ Superstar by Andrew Lloyd Webber
2009–2010	Jewish folk: Hava Nagila	Schindler's List by John Williams

== Competitive highlights ==
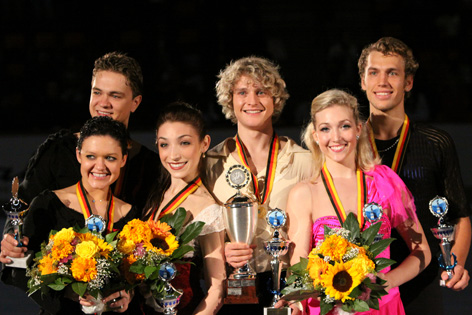
The Zaretskys with the other medalists at the 2009 Nebelhorn Trophy.

GP: Grand Prix; JGP: Junior Grand Prix

with Roman Zaretsky

International
Event	00–01	01–02	02–03	03–04	04–05	05–06	06–07	07–08	08–09	09–10
Olympics						22nd				10th
Worlds						20th	14th	9th	13th	6th
Europeans						15th	11th	8th	11th	7th
GP Cup of China						9th	4th	4th	7th	5th
GP Cup of Russia									5th	
GP NHK Trophy						9th				
GP Skate America							8th	7th		3rd
Golden Spin										1st
Nebelhorn							3rd		2nd	2nd
Skate Israel				4th		4th				
Universiade									1st	
International: Junior
Junior Worlds		19th	8th	9th	4th					
JGP Final				6th	8th					
JGP Germany			3rd		3rd					
JGP Italy		8th								
JGP Mexico				2nd						
JGP Netherlands		11th								
JGP Poland				1st						
JGP Romania					2nd					
JGP Serbia			3rd							
EYOF			3rd							
National
Israeli Champ.	1st J	1st J	1st J	1st J		2nd	1st	1st	1st	

== See also ==
- List of select Jewish figure skaters
