= Sarah Hecken =

German figure skater

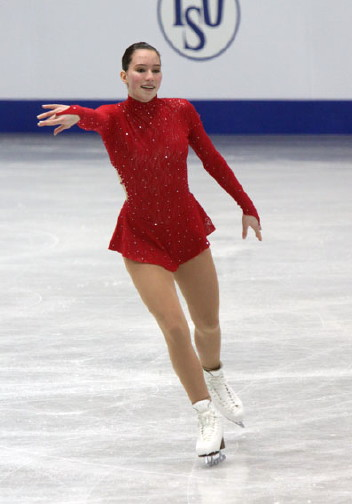
- Hecken at the 2009 World Junior Championships

Personal information
- Full name: Sarah Stefanie Hecken
- Born: 27 August 1993 (age 32) Mannheim, Germany
- Home town: Mannheim, Germany
- Height: 1.70 m (5 ft 7 in)

Figure skating career
- Country: Germany
- Coach: Stefan Lindemann
- Skating club: Mannheimer ERC
- Began skating: 1996
- Retired: December 2015

Sarah Stefanie Hecken (born 27 August 1993) is a German retired figure skater. She is a four-time German national champion (2008, 2010, 2011 and 2013) and has won twelve senior international medals, including six gold. She has placed as high as 11th at the World Championships. Her first international victory was at the 2007 Junior Grand Prix event in Germany.

== Personal life ==
Sarah Stefanie Hecken was born in Mannheim.

== Career ==
=== Early years ===
Hecken got her first skates when she was only 18 months old. Her first moves on skates were done during summer training in Kaiserslautern. Peter Sczypa became her coach in 1997. At the age of five, she landed her first single axel and at 9 years old, she landed her first double Axel and triple jump (toe loop).

At the age of 10, she skated at the German Novice Championships, which was held as an open competition, where she won the silver medal. Due to her young age, she skated at the Novice Competition again one year later at 11, where she won her first national title.

In the 2005–2006 season, Hecken skated in the youth category and won her second national title. During that season, she skated her first senior competition, the Baden-Württembergische Championship, and won that regional title at the senior level.

2006–2007 was her first national junior year, but she was still too young for international junior competitions. She won her third national title at the German Championships in the junior category. Again, she won the Baden-Württembergische Championship in the senior class.

=== 2007–2008 season ===
After placing 13th at the Junior Grand Prix in Vienna, Austria, Hecken rebounded by winning the Junior Grand Prix in Chemnitz, Germany, becoming the first ever German lady to win a Junior Grand Prix event. At that event she landed her 3Toe-3Toe Combination for the first time.

After winning the first and second German Junior Worlds qualifier and the Eisemann Trophy in Stuttgart, Germany, Hecken went on to take her fourth consecutive national title by winning the senior competition at the German Figure Skating Championships in Dresden, becoming the youngest German lady to ever win that title.

Hecken defended her regional title at the Baden-Württembergische Champion for the third time. She also won the senior competition of the 2008 Bavarian Open before heading of to the 2008 World Junior Championships in Sofia, Bulgaria where she placed 8th.

=== 2008–2009 season ===
Hecken began the 2008–2009 season at the Junior Grand Prix in Merano Italy, where she placed third. Her next competitions were the Nebelhorn Trophy in Oberstdorf, Germany and third the Junior Grand Prix in Cape Town, South Africa where she placed 9th and 5th respectively. Hecken claimed her first senior ISU medal at the 2008 Ondrej Nepela Memorial in Bratislava, Slovakia where she placed 3rd.

After placing fourth at the German Championships in Oberstdorf, Germany she returned to Oberstdorf in January 2009 to win the German Junior Worlds qualifier held there as part of the Bavarian Open only days after defending her regional championships title.

Hecken ended the season on a high note by placing 7th at the World Junior Championships in Sofia and winning both the 2009 DEU Pokal in Dortmund, Germany and the 2009 Triglav Trophy

=== 2009–2010 season ===
The first competition of Hecken's Olympic season was the Nebelhorn Trophy in Oberstdorf, Germany. She placed 7th overall and with a score of 130.73 point she met the German Olympic qualifying criteria for the first time. At her second competition, the Coupe Internationale de Nice, Hecken noticed during the warm-up that her skates didn't feel right and after inspection she noticed that the blade was broken and withdrew from the event.

Hecken was invited to her first two Grand Prix events of her career. At Skate America she placed 8th and scored 131.10. With that score she met the qualifying criteria for the Olympics for the second time. At Skate Canada she placed 9th. On 17 December 2009, one day before the short program at the German Championship, she was officially nominated for the Olympic Games by the German Olympic Sport Confederation. As she was the only lady who met the criteria for the Olympic Games, her berth to the European Championships was confirmed before the German Championship. Hecken won the German Championships by more than 20 points over the second-place finisher. At the 2010 Winter Olympics she was 23rd after the short program with a score of 49.04. In the free skate she scored 94.90 points and ranked 15th. Overall, she placed 18th with a combined score of 143.94 points.

=== 2011–present ===
In May 2011, Hecken underwent hand surgery and went to Italy the next month to work with her choreographer Edoardo De Bernardis. In November 2011, she underwent a synovial bursa operation and returned to training in January 2012. She withdrew from the 2012 European Championships because she was not able to skate full programs prior to the championships but competed at the 2012 World Championships in late March.

Hecken competed at the 2012 Skate America. She won her fourth German national title, in Hamburg in December 2012, but lost the direct qualification for the European Championships versus Nathalie Weinzierl.

== Programs ==
Season	Short program	Free skating	Exhibition
2014–2015	Nero by Thomas Bergersen performed by Two Steps from Hell	Bohemian Rhapsody by Queen	
2013–2014	Van Helsing by Alan Silvestri; Dracula	Libertango performed by Bond	Hall of Fame by The Script feat. Will.i.am
2012–2013	Asturia by Electric String Quartett	Awakening by Secret Garden; Breath and Life by Audiomachine	
2011–2012	Malaguena by Ernesto Lecuona	Valse No. 10 by Frédéric Chopin; Piano Fantasy by William Joseph	
2010–2011	Tango de los Exilados by Walter Taieb, Vanessa-Mae	Zazdrosc i Medycyna; Smuga Cienia by Wojciech Kilar; Revolutionary Etude performed by Maksim Mrvica	
2009–2010	Dance of the Knights from Romeo and Juliet by Sergei Prokofiev; Romeo and Juliet by Nino Rota; Romeo and Juliet Ouverture by Pyotr Tchaikovsky	Croatian Rhapsody; Wonderland; Lee Loos' Tune performed by Maksim Mrvica	
2008–2009	Summer of '42 by Michel Legrand	Spanish Caravan	
2007–2008	Dark Eyes	Red Hot by Vanessa-Mae	Because of You by Kelly Clarkson
2006–2007	Selections by Felix Mendelssohn	Zorro	Because of You by Kelly Clarkson
2005–2006	The Four Seasons by Antonio Vivaldi	Zorro	

== Competitive highlights ==
GP: Grand Prix; CS: Challenger Series (began in the 2014–15 season); JGP: Junior Grand Prix

International
Event	06–07	07–08	08–09	09–10	10–11	11–12	12–13	13–14	14–15
Olympics				18th					
Worlds				12th	11th	20th			
Europeans				16th	11th	WD		34th	
GP Bompard					10th	WD			
GP Skate America				8th			10th		
GP Skate Canada				9th		8th			
CS Ice Challenge					3rd				8th
CS Warsaw Cup									11th
Bavarian Open		1st				4th	2nd		
Cup of Nice				WD				11th	15th
Dragon Trophy								8th	
Fischer Pokal	2nd		1st						
Lombardia								2nd	
Merano Cup							1st	2nd	
Nebelhorn			9th	7th	WD	6th	10th		
Nepela Trophy			3rd					7th	
New Year's Cup							1st		
NRW Trophy					2nd		15th		
Printemps						1st			
Triglav Trophy			1st						
Universiade									25th
International: Junior
Junior Worlds		8th	7th						
JGP Austria		13th							
JGP Germany		1st							
JGP Italy			3rd						
JGP South Africa			5th						
National
German Champ.	1st J.	1st	4th	1st	1st		1st	2nd	4th
WD = Withdrew; J. = Junior

== Detailed results ==
2010–2011 Season
Date	Event	Level	SP	FS	Points
November 26–28, 2010	2010 ISU Grand Prix Trophée Eric Bompard	Senior	9; 46.73	10; 83.44	10; 130.17
2009–2010 Season
Date	Event	Level	SP	FS	Points
March 22 – 28, 2010	2010 World Figure Skating Championships	Senior	13; 55.20	13; 98.78	12; 153.94
February 14 – 27, 2010	2010 Winter Olympic Games	Senior	23; 49.04	15; 94.90	18; 143.94
January 18–24, 2009	2010 European Figure Skating Championships	Senior	16; 46.43	16; 75.45	16; 121.79
December 17–20, 2009	2010 German Figure Skating Championships	Senior	1; 56.64	1; 100.82	1; 157.46
November 12–15, 2008	ISU Senior Grand Prix, Skate Canada	Senior	10; 45.50	7; 78.90	9; 124.40
November 12–15, 2008	ISU Senior Grand Prix, Skate America	Senior	12; 43.86	8; 87.24	8; 131.10
September 23–26, 2008	Nebelhorn Trophy	Senior	7; 47.58	7; 83.15	7; 130.73
2008–2009 Season
Date	Event	Level	SP	FS	Points
February 23 – March 1, 2009	ISU 2009 World Junior Championships	Junior	9; 48.14	5; 87.69	7; 135.83
December 18–22, 2009	2009 German Figure Skating Championships	Senior	2; 50.12	6; 79.69	4; 129.81
October 8–11, 2008	ISU Junior Grand Prix, South Africa	Junior	5; 44.06	3; 83.08	5; 127.14
September 3–06, 2008	ISU Junior Grand Prix, Italy	Junior	4; 45.94	7; 72.71	3; 118.65
2007–2008 Season
Date	Event	Level	SP	FS	Points
February 25 – March 2, 2009	ISU 2008 World Junior Championships	Junior	11; 46.12	8; 82.33	8; 128.45
January 3–06, 2009	2008 German Figure Skating Championships	Senior	7; 41.42	1; 92.86	1; 134.28
October 10–13, 2008	ISU Junior Grand Prix, Germany	Junior	5; 45.45	1; 88.60	1; 134.05
September 12–15, 2008	ISU Junior Grand Prix, Austria	Junior	13; 37.96	13; 64.96	13; 102.92
