= 2009–10 figure skating season =

- Date: 1 July 2009 – 30 June 2010
- Previous: 2008–09
- Next: 2010–11

The 2009–10 figure skating season began on 1 July 2009, and ended on 30 June 2010. During this season, elite skaters competed at the Olympic level at the 2010 Winter Olympics, on the ISU Championship level at the 2010 European, Four Continents, World Junior, and World Championships. They also competed in elite competitions such as the 2009–10 ISU Grand Prix of Figure Skating.

== Season notes ==
It was the final season in which the compulsory dance and the original dance were contested in ice dance. Following this season, the International Skating Union instituted the short dance.

Isabelle Delobel competed at the Olympics with partner Olivier Schoenfelder just four-and-a-half months after giving birth. On 28 June 2010, the International Skating Union announced that Evgeni Plushenko had lost his eligibility due to participating in March and April shows without his federation's permission.

=== Age eligibility ===
Skaters competing on the junior level were required to be at least 13 but not 19 – or 21 for male pair skaters and ice dancers – before 1 July 2009. Those who had turned 14 were eligible for the senior Grand Prix series and senior B internationals. Those who turned 15 before 1 July 2009 were also eligible for the senior World, European, and Four Continents Championships.

Date of birth	Eligibility
Born before 1 July 1996	Eligible for Junior Grand Prix
Born before 1 July 1995	Eligible for senior Grand Prix series, senior B internationals
Born before 1 July 1994	Eligible for senior Worlds, Europeans, Four Continents
Born before 1 July 1990	Not eligible for junior events (except male pair skaters and ice dancers)
Born before 1 July 1988	Male pair skaters and ice dancers not eligible for junior events

=== Partnership changes ===
Partnership splits and/or formation of new teams included:

Discipline	Announced	Type	Skaters	Other notes
Pairs	March 2010	Split	Tatiana Volosozhar / Stanislav Morozov	Morozov retired.
Pairs	29 March 2010	New team	Katarina Gerboldt / Alexander Enbert
Pairs	30 March 2010	Split	Maria Mukhortova / Maxim Trankov
Ice dance	4 May 2010	Split	Jana Khokhlova / Sergei Novitski
Ice dance	May 2010	New team	Jana Khokhlova / Fedor Andreev
Ice dance	Spring 2010	Split	Katherine Copely / Deividas Stagniūnas
Ice dance	Spring 2010	New team	Isabella Tobias / Deividas Stagniūnas
Pairs	May 2010	New team	Tatiana Volosozhar / Maxim Trankov
Pairs	12 May 2010	New team	Maria Mukhortova / Jérôme Blanchard
Pairs	21 May 2010	Split	Anabelle Langlois / Cody Hay	Langlois retired.
Pairs	22 June 2010	Split	Keauna McLaughlin / Rockne Brubaker	McLaughlin retired.

=== Coaching changes ===
Discipline	Announced	Skater(s)	From	To
Men	8 January 2010	Patrick Chan	Don Laws	Christy Krall, Lori Nichol
Ladies	February/May 2010	Alissa Czisny	Julianne Berlin	Yuka Sato, Jason Dungjen
Ladies	March/June 2010	Mao Asada	Tatiana Tarasova	Hiroshi Nagakubo

=== Retirements ===
A number of elite skaters announced their retirement from competition:

Discipline	Announced	Skater(s)
Pairs	17 February 2010	Shen Xue / Zhao Hongbo
Ice dance	23 February 2010	Isabelle Delobel / Olivier Schoenfelder
Men	9 March 2010	Stephane Lambiel
Ladies	De facto	Joannie Rochette
Ladies	De facto	Júlia Sebestyén
Ladies	De facto	Susanna Pöykiö
Ice dance	11 May 2010	Kimberly Navarro / Brent Bommentre
Ice dance	10 June 2010	Tanith Belbin / Benjamin Agosto
Ice dance	20 June 2010	Alexandra Zaretsky / Roman Zaretsky
Ice dance	De facto	Oksana Domnina / Maxim Shabalin
Ice dance	6 August 2010	Ekaterina Rubleva / Ivan Shefer

== Competitions ==
Key

ISU Champ.	Grand Prix	Other int.	National

Date	Event	Type	Level	Disc.	Location	
2009
27 Aug. – 29 Sept.	JGP Budapest	Grand Prix	Junior	M/L/D	Budapest, Hungary	Details
28–30 August	New Zealand Winter Games	Other int.	Sen.–Nov.	M/L	Dunedin, New Zealand	Details
3–5 September	Chinese Championships	Nats.	Senior	All	Beijing, China	
3–5 September	JGP Lake Placid	Grand Prix	Junior	All	Lake Placid, NY, U.S.	Details
10–12 September	JGP Torun Cup	Grand Prix	Junior	All	Toruń, Poland	Details
10–12 September	Master's de Patinage	Other nat.	Sen.–Jun.	All	Orléans, France	Details
24–26 September	Nebelhorn Trophy	Other int.	Senior	All	Oberstdorf, Germany	Details
24–26 September	JGP Minsk Ice	Grand Prix	Junior	All	Minsk, Belarus	Details
1–3 October	JGP Blauen Schwerter	Grand Prix	Junior	All	Dresden, Germany	Details
8–10 October	JGP Croatia Cup	Grand Prix	Junior	M/L/D	Zagreb, Croatia	Details
9–11 October	Finlandia Trophy	Other int.	Senior	M/L/D	Vantaa, Finland	Details
15–17 October	JGP Bosphorus	Grand Prix	Junior	M/L/D	Istanbul, Turkey	Details
16–17 October	Trophée Eric Bompard	Grand Prix	Senior	All	Paris, France	Details
23–24 October	Cup of Russia	Grand Prix	Senior	All	Moscow, Russia	Details
30–31 October	Cup of China	Grand Prix	Senior	All	Beijing, China	Details
4–8 November	Coupe de Nice	Other int.	Sen.–Jun.	All	Nice, France	Details
5–7 November	Ondrej Nepela Memorial	Other int.	Senior	All	Piešťany, Slovakia	
6–8 November	NHK Trophy	Grand Prix	Senior	All	Nagano, Japan	Details
6–8 November	NRW Trophy	Other int.	Sen.–PN.	D	Dortmund, Germany	Details
7–8 November	Skate Celje	Other int.	Jun.–Nov.	M/L	Celje, Slovenia	Details
12–15 November	Merano Cup	Other int.	Sen.–Nov.	M/L	Merano, Italy	
13–15 November	Skate America	Grand Prix	Senior	All	Lake Placid, NY	Details
19–22 November	Warsaw Cup	Other int.	Jun.–Nov.	M/L/P	Warsaw, Poland	Details
20–22 November	Pavel Roman Memorial	Other int.	Senior	D	Olomouc, Czech Republic	
20–22 November	Skate Canada	Grand Prix	Senior	All	Kitchener, ON, Canada	Details
21–23 November	Japan Junior Champ.	Nats.	Junior	M/L/D	Yokohama, Japan	Details
27–29 November	Crystal Skate of Romania	Other int.	Senior	M/L	Galați, Romania	
3–6 December	NRW Trophy	Other int.	Sen.–Nov.	M/L/P	Dortmund, Germany	Details
3–6 December	Grand Prix Final	Grand Prix	Sen.–Jun.	All	Tokyo, Japan	Details
10–12 December	Golden Spin of Zagreb	Other int.	Senior	All	Zagreb, Croatia	Details
17–20 December	Three Nationals Championships (Czech, Slovak, Polish)	Nats.	Sen.–PN.	All	Cieszyn, Poland	Details
17–20 December	German Championships	Nats.	Sen.–Nov.	All	Mannheim, Germany	Details
18–19 December	French Championships	Nats.	Senior	All	Marseille, France	Details
24–26 December	Russian Championships	Nats.	Senior	All	Saint Petersburg, Russia	Details
25–27 December	Japan Championships	Nats.	Senior	All	Osaka, Japan	Details
2010
11–17 January	Canadian Championships	Nats.	Sen.–Nov.	All	London, ON, Canada	Details
14–24 January	U.S. Championships	Nats.	Sen.–Nov.	All	Spokane, U.S.	
18–24 January	European Championships	ISU Champ.	Senior	All	Tallinn, Estonia	Details
27–30 January	Four Continents Championships	ISU Champ.	Senior	All	Jeonju, South Korea	Details
4–6 February	Russian Junior Championships	Nats.	Junior	All	Saransk, Russia	Details
4–7 February	Nordic Championships	Other int.	Sen.–Nov.	M/L	Asker, Norway	Details
14–27 February	Winter Olympics	Olympics	Senior	All	Vancouver, BC, Canada	Details
8–14 March	World Junior Championships	ISU Champ.	Junior	All	The Hague, Netherlands	Details
22–28 March	World Championships	ISU Champ.	Senior	All	Turin, Italy	Details
1–4 April	Triglav Trophy	Other int.	Sen.–Nov.	M/L	Jesenice, Slovenia	Details
Type: ISU Champ. = ISU Championships; Other int. = International events except ISU Championships and Grand Prix; Nats. = National championships; Other nat. = Other national events Levels: Sen. = Senior; Jun. = Junior; Nov. = Novice; PN. = Pre-Novice; Disciplines: M = Men's singles; L = Ladies' singles; P = Pair skating; D = Ice dance; All = All four disciplines

== Records ==
During the season, the following world records were set:

Discipline	Segment	Skater	Score	Event	Date
Men	Short Program	(Russia) Evgeni Plushenko	91.30	2010 European Championships	20 January 2010
Ladies	Free Skating	(South Korea) Kim Yuna	133.95	2009 Trophée Eric Bompard	17 October 2009
Ladies	Combined Total	(South Korea) Kim Yuna	210.03	2009 Trophée Eric Bompard	17 October 2009
Ladies	Short Program	(South Korea) Kim Yuna	76.28	2009 Skate America	14 November 2009
Ladies	Short Program	(South Korea) Kim Yuna	78.50	2010 Winter Olympics	23 February 2010
Ladies	Free Skating	(South Korea) Kim Yuna	150.06	2010 Winter Olympics	25 February 2010
Ladies	Combined Total	(South Korea) Kim Yuna	228.56	2010 Winter Olympics	25 February 2010
Pairs	Short Program	(China) Shen Xue / Zhao Hongbo	75.36	2009–2010 Grand Prix Final	3 December 2009
Pairs	Combined Total	(China) Shen Xue / Zhao Hongbo	214.25	2009–10 Grand Prix Final	5 December 2009
Pairs	Free Skating	(Russia) Yuko Kavaguti / Alexander Smirnov	139.23	2010 European Championships	20 January 2010
Pairs	Short Program	(China) Shen Xue / Zhao Hongbo	76.66	2010 Winter Olympics	14 February 2010
Pairs	Free Skating	(China) Pang Qing / Tong Jian	141.81	2010 Winter Olympics	15 February 2010
Pairs	Combined Total	(China) Shen Xue / Zhao Hongbo	216.57	2010 Winter Olympics	15 February 2010
Ice Dance	Original Dance	(Canada) Tessa Virtue / Scott Moir	70.27	2010 World Championships	25 March 2010

== ISU & Olympic Champions ==
During the season, the following skaters won ISU Championships and the 2010 Winter Olympic Games.

Discipline	Winter Olympics	World Championships	European Championships	Four Continents Championships	World Junior Championship
Men	Evan Lysacek	Daisuke Takahashi	Evgeni Plushenko	Adam Rippon	Yuzuru Hanyu
Ladies	Kim Yuna	Mao Asada	Carolina Kostner	Mao Asada	Kanako Murakami
Pair skating	Shen Xue / Zhao Hongbo	Pang Qing / Tong Jian	Yuko Kavaguti / Alexander Smirnov	Zhang Dan / Zhang Hao	Sui Wenjing / Han Cong
Ice Dance	Tessa Virtue / Scott Moir	Tessa Virtue / Scott Moir	Oksana Domnina / Maxim Shabalin	Kaitlyn Weaver / Andrew Poje	Elena Ilinykh / Nikita Katsalapov

== Season's best scores ==
The following are all the season's best scores set over the season.

=== Men ===
Men's season's best scores on 25 March 2010.

Rank	Name	Country	Points	Event
1	Daisuke Takahashi	Japan	257.70	World Championships 2010
2	Evan Lysacek	United States	257.67	XXI Olympic Winter Games 2010
3	Evgeni Plushenko	Russia	256.36	XXI Olympic Winter Games 2010
4	Patrick Chan	Canada	247.22	World Championships 2010
5	Stéphane Lambiel	Switzerland	246.72	XXI Olympic Winter Games 2010
6	Nobunari Oda	Japan	243.36	ISU GP Final 2009/2010
7	Brian Joubert	France	241.74	World Championships 2010
8	Johnny Weir	United States	238.87	XXI Olympic Winter Games 2010
9	Michal Březina	Czech Republic	236.06	World Championships 2010
10	Jeremy Abbott	United States	235.38	ISU GP Final 2009/2010

=== Ladies ===
Ladies season's best scores on 27 March 2010.

Rank	Name	Country	Points	Event
1	Kim Yuna	South Korea	228.56	XXI Olympic Winter Games 2010
2	Mao Asada	Japan	205.50	XXI Olympic Winter Games 2010
3	Joannie Rochette	Canada	202.64	XXI Olympic Winter Games 2010
4	Mirai Nagasu	United States	190.15	XXI Olympic Winter Games 2010
5	Miki Ando	Japan	188.86	XXI Olympic Winter Games 2010
6	Laura Lepistö	Finland	187.97	XXI Olympic Winter Games 2010
7	Rachael Flatt	United States	182.49	XXI Olympic Winter Games 2010
8	Akiko Suzuki	Japan	181.44	XXI Olympic Winter Games 2010
9	Cynthia Phaneuf	Canada	177.54	World Championships 2010
10	Carolina Kostner	Italy	177.31	World Championships 2010

=== Pairs ===
Pairs season's best scores on 24 March 2010.

Rank	Name	Country	Points	Event
1	Xue Shen / Hongbo Zhao	China	216.57	XXI Olympic Winter Games 2010
2	Qing Pang / Jian Tong	China	213.31	XXI Olympic Winter Games 2010
3	Yuko Kavaguti / Alexander Smirnov	Russia	213.15	European Championships 2010
4	Aliona Savchenko / Robin Szolkowy	Germany	211.72	European Championships 2010
5	Maria Mukhortova / Maxim Trankov	Russia	202.03	European Championships 2010
6	Dan Zhang / Hao Zhang	China	195.78	World Championships 2010
7	Tatiana Volosozhar / Stanislav Morozov	Ukraine	187.83	European Championships 2010
8	Jessica Dubé / Bryce Davison	Canada	187.11	XXI Olympic Winter Games 2010
9	Anabelle Langlois / Cody Hay	Canada	179.97	XXI Olympic Winter Games 2010
10	Caydee Denney / Jeremy Barrett	United States	172.47	World Championships 2010

=== Ice dance ===
Ice dance season's best scores on 26 March 2010.

Rank	Name	Country	Points	Event
1	Tessa Virtue / Scott Moir	Canada	224.43	World Championships 2010
2	Meryl Davis / Charlie White	United States	223.03	World Championships 2010
3	Oksana Domnina / Maxim Shabalin	Russia	207.64	XXI Olympic Winter Games 2010
4	Tanith Belbin / Benjamin Agosto	United States	203.07	XXI Olympic Winter Games 2010
5	Federica Faiella / Massimo Scali	Italy	199.17	XXI Olympic Winter Games 2010
6	Nathalie Péchalat / Fabian Bourzat	France	194.39	World Championships 2010
7	Isabelle Delobel / Olivier Schoenfelder	France	193.73	XXI Olympic Winter Games 2010
8	Jana Khokhlova / Sergei Novitski	Russia	189.67	European Championships 2010
9	Sinead Kerr / John Kerr	United Kingdom	189.11	World Championships 2010
10	Elena Ilinykh / Nikita Katsalapov	Russia	188.28	World Junior Championships 2010

== World standings ==
=== Season-end standings (top 30) ===
==== Men's singles ====
As of 25 March 2010

Rank	Nation	Skater	Points	Season	ISU Championships or Olympics	(Junior) Grand Prix and Final		Selected International Competition	
Rank	Nation	Skater	Points	Season	Best	Best	2nd Best	Best	2nd Best
1	USA	Evan Lysacek	4378	2009/2010 season (100%)	1200	800	400	0	0
1	USA	Evan Lysacek	4378	2008/2009 season (100%)	1200	324	324	0	0
1	USA	Evan Lysacek	4378	2007/2008 season (70%)	476	454	252	0	0
2	CZE	Tomáš Verner	4048	2009/2010 season (100%)	325	472	360	250	0
2	CZE	Tomáš Verner	4048	2008/2009 season (100%)	875	583	360	203	182
2	CZE	Tomáš Verner	4048	2007/2008 season (70%)	588	252	165	175	142
3	CAN	Patrick Chan	3733	2009/2010 season (100%)	1080	236	0	0	0
3	CAN	Patrick Chan	3733	2008/2009 season (100%)	1080	525	400	0	0
3	CAN	Patrick Chan	3733	2007/2008 season (70%)	362	368	280	0	0
4	JPN	Daisuke Takahashi	3732	2009/2010 season (100%)	1200	525	360	250	0
4	JPN	Daisuke Takahashi	3732	2008/2009 season (100%)	0	0	0	0	0
4	JPN	Daisuke Takahashi	3732	2007/2008 season (70%)	613	504	280	0	0
5	USA	Jeremy Abbott	3521	2009/2010 season (100%)	787	583	400	0	0
5	USA	Jeremy Abbott	3521	2008/2009 season (100%)	551	800	400	0	0
5	USA	Jeremy Abbott	3521	2007/2008 season (70%)	386	204	134	0	0
6	USA	Johnny Weir	3453	2009/2010 season (100%)	709	648	360	0	0
6	USA	Johnny Weir	3453	2008/2009 season (100%)	0	648	360	0	0
6	USA	Johnny Weir	3453	2007/2008 season (70%)	680	408	280	0	0
7	CZE	Michal Brezina	3420	2009/2010 season (100%)	875	324	292	203	182
7	CZE	Michal Brezina	3420	2008/2009 season (100%)	644	250	250	225	0
7	CZE	Michal Brezina	3420	2007/2008 season (70%)	328	158	93	175	0
8	FRA	Brian Joubert	3328	2009/2010 season (100%)	972	400	292	0	0
8	FRA	Brian Joubert	3328	2008/2009 season (100%)	972	400	292	0	0
8	FRA	Brian Joubert	3328	2007/2008 season (70%)	756	280	0	0	0
9	JPN	Nobunari Oda	3296	2009/2010 season (100%)	638	720	400	0	0
9	JPN	Nobunari Oda	3296	2008/2009 season (100%)	638	400	0	250	250
9	JPN	Nobunari Oda	3296	2007/2008 season (70%)	0	0	0	0	0
10	BEL	Kevin van der Perren	3187	2009/2010 season (100%)	574	262	0	203	0
10	BEL	Kevin van der Perren	3187	2008/2009 season (100%)	680	236	0	250	225
10	BEL	Kevin van der Perren	3187	2007/2008 season (70%)	496	330	252	175	142
11	FRA	Yannick Ponsero	3126	2009/2010 season (100%)	496	262	262	250	0
11	FRA	Yannick Ponsero	3126	2008/2009 season (100%)	612	324	292	250	203
11	FRA	Yannick Ponsero	3126	2007/2008 season (70%)	185	165	165	175	0
12	FRA	Alban Préaubert	3099	2009/2010 season (100%)	446	324	213	225	203
12	FRA	Alban Préaubert	3099	2008/2009 season (100%)	551	324	324	250	225
12	FRA	Alban Préaubert	3099	2007/2008 season (70%)	228	227	183	0	0
13	JPN	Takahiko Kozuka	2976	2009/2010 season (100%)	574	360	213	0	0
13	JPN	Takahiko Kozuka	2976	2008/2009 season (100%)	709	720	400	0	0
13	JPN	Takahiko Kozuka	2976	2007/2008 season (70%)	402	183	134	0	0
14	ITA	Samuel Contesti	2929	2009/2010 season (100%)	638	292	262	250	225
14	ITA	Samuel Contesti	2929	2008/2009 season (100%)	787	0	0	250	225
14	ITA	Samuel Contesti	2929	2007/2008 season (70%)	0	0	0	158	0
15	USA	Adam Rippon	2797	2009/2010 season (100%)	840	324	236	0	0
15	USA	Adam Rippon	2797	2008/2009 season (100%)	715	262	191	0	0
15	USA	Adam Rippon	2797	2007/2008 season (70%)	501	420	175	0	0
16	SUI	Stéphane Lambiel	2488	2009/2010 season (100%)	875	0	0	250	0
16	SUI	Stéphane Lambiel	2488	2008/2009 season (100%)	0	0	0	0	0
16	SUI	Stéphane Lambiel	2488	2007/2008 season (70%)	551	560	252	0	0
17	RUS	Sergei Voronov	2449	2009/2010 season (100%)	305	324	236	225	164
17	RUS	Sergei Voronov	2449	2008/2009 season (100%)	362	236	213	203	0
17	RUS	Sergei Voronov	2449	2007/2008 season (70%)	447	252	0	0	0
18	KAZ	Denis Ten	2385	2009/2010 season (100%)	418	213	0	250	182
18	KAZ	Denis Ten	2385	2008/2009 season (100%)	574	394	250	0	0
18	KAZ	Denis Ten	2385	2007/2008 season (70%)	103	104	68	0	0
19	SWE	Adrian Schultheiss	2325	2009/2010 season (100%)	517	236	213	225	203
19	SWE	Adrian Schultheiss	2325	2008/2009 season (100%)	200	213	213	0	0
19	SWE	Adrian Schultheiss	2325	2007/2008 season (70%)	347	127	104	158	0
20	USA	Brandon Mroz	2195	2009/2010 season (100%)	612	213	191	0	0
20	USA	Brandon Mroz	2195	2008/2009 season (100%)	517	262	213	0	0
20	USA	Brandon Mroz	2195	2007/2008 season (70%)	365	378	175	0	0
21	CHN	Nan Song	2142	2009/2010 season (100%)	644	540	250	0	0
21	CHN	Nan Song	2142	2008/2009 season (100%)	380	164	164	0	0
21	CHN	Nan Song	2142	2007/2008 season (70%)	0	127	0	0	0
22	CAN	Kevin Reynolds	1999	2009/2010 season (100%)	680	236	191	0	0
22	CAN	Kevin Reynolds	1999	2008/2009 season (100%)	308	292	292	0	0
22	CAN	Kevin Reynolds	1999	2007/2008 season (70%)	295	134	0	0	0
23	RUS	Artem Borodulin	1997	2009/2010 season (100%)	339	324	191	225	0
23	RUS	Artem Borodulin	1997	2008/2009 season (100%)	237	292	0	0	0
23	RUS	Artem Borodulin	1997	2007/2008 season (70%)	451	175	142	0	0
24	JPN	Yuzuru Hanyu	1953	2009/2010 season (100%)	715	600	250	0	0
24	JPN	Yuzuru Hanyu	1953	2008/2009 season (100%)	224	164	0	0	0
24	JPN	Yuzuru Hanyu	1953	2007/2008 season (70%)	0	0	0	0	0
25	RUS	Artur Gachinski	1945	2009/2010 season (100%)	579	354	250	250	0
25	RUS	Artur Gachinski	1945	2008/2009 season (100%)	0	287	225	0	0
25	RUS	Artur Gachinski	1945	2007/2008 season (70%)	0	201	158	0	0
26	FRA	Florent Amodio	1828	2009/2010 season (100%)	377	292	0	0	0
26	FRA	Florent Amodio	1828	2008/2009 season (100%)	164	600	250	0	0
26	FRA	Florent Amodio	1828	2007/2008 season (70%)	194	115	93	0	0
27	USA	Ryan Bradley	1813	2009/2010 season (100%)	551	324	0	182	0
27	USA	Ryan Bradley	1813	2008/2009 season (100%)	0	360	213	0	0
27	USA	Ryan Bradley	1813	2007/2008 season (70%)	0	183	165	0	0
28	CAN	Shawn Sawyer	1774	2009/2010 season (100%)	446	360	191	0	0
28	CAN	Shawn Sawyer	1774	2008/2009 season (100%)	0	262	262	0	0
28	CAN	Shawn Sawyer	1774	2007/2008 season (70%)	253	149	0	0	0
29	ESP	Javier Fernandez	1757	2009/2010 season (100%)	402	0	0	250	203
29	ESP	Javier Fernandez	1757	2008/2009 season (100%)	293	182	148	203	0
29	ESP	Javier Fernandez	1757	2007/2008 season (70%)	141	76	0	0	0
30	USA	Stephen Carriere	1690	2009/2010 season (100%)	0	236	191	203	0
30	USA	Stephen Carriere	1690	2008/2009 season (100%)	0	360	236	0	0
30	USA	Stephen Carriere	1690	2007/2008 season (70%)	428	227	204	0	0

==== Ladies' singles ====
As of 27 March 2010

Rank	Nation	Skater	Points	Season	ISU Championships or Olympics	(Junior) Grand Prix and Final		Selected International Competition	
Rank	Nation	Skater	Points	Season	Best	Best	2nd Best	Best	2nd Best
1	KOR	Yuna Kim	4880	2009/2010 season (100%)	1200	800	400	0	0
1	KOR	Yuna Kim	4880	2008/2009 season (100%)	1200	720	400	0	0
1	KOR	Yuna Kim	4880	2007/2008 season (70%)	680	560	280	0	0
2	ITA	Carolina Kostner	4195	2009/2010 season (100%)	840	236	236	250	0
2	ITA	Carolina Kostner	4195	2008/2009 season (100%)	756	648	400	250	0
2	ITA	Carolina Kostner	4195	2007/2008 season (70%)	756	454	280	175	142
3	JPN	Mao Asada	4139	2009/2010 season (100%)	1200	360	262	0	0
3	JPN	Mao Asada	4139	2008/2009 season (100%)	875	800	400	0	0
3	JPN	Mao Asada	4139	2007/2008 season (70%)	840	504	280	0	0
4	CAN	Joannie Rochette	3960	2009/2010 season (100%)	972	525	400	0	0
4	CAN	Joannie Rochette	3960	2008/2009 season (100%)	1080	583	400	0	0
4	CAN	Joannie Rochette	3960	2007/2008 season (70%)	551	227	227	0	0
5	FIN	Laura Lepistö	3801	2009/2010 season (100%)	972	324	262	225	0
5	FIN	Laura Lepistö	3801	2008/2009 season (100%)	840	324	262	225	225
5	FIN	Laura Lepistö	3801	2007/2008 season (70%)	476	183	149	142	127
6	JPN	Miki Ando	3799	2009/2010 season (100%)	875	720	400	0	0
6	JPN	Miki Ando	3799	2008/2009 season (100%)	972	472	360	0	0
6	JPN	Miki Ando	3799	2007/2008 season (70%)	476	252	204	0	0
7	JPN	Akiko Suzuki	3444	2009/2010 season (100%)	756	648	400	250	0
7	JPN	Akiko Suzuki	3444	2008/2009 season (100%)	402	360	0	250	203
7	JPN	Akiko Suzuki	3444	2007/2008 season (70%)	0	0	0	175	175
8	RUS	Alena Leonova	3014	2009/2010 season (100%)	517	472	360	250	0
8	RUS	Alena Leonova	3014	2008/2009 season (100%)	715	262	213	225	0
8	RUS	Alena Leonova	3014	2007/2008 season (70%)	295	158	115	0	0
9	USA	Rachael Flatt	2815	2009/2010 season (100%)	638	360	292	0	0
9	USA	Rachael Flatt	2815	2008/2009 season (100%)	787	360	292	0	0
9	USA	Rachael Flatt	2815	2007/2008 season (70%)	501	378	175	0	0
10	HUN	Júlia Sebestyén	2737	2009/2010 season (100%)	496	324	236	250	182
10	HUN	Júlia Sebestyén	2737	2008/2009 season (100%)	402	213	0	250	0
10	HUN	Júlia Sebestyén	2737	2007/2008 season (70%)	428	183	149	175	115
11	FIN	Kiira Korpi	2619	2009/2010 season (100%)	612	360	191	225	203
11	FIN	Kiira Korpi	2619	2008/2009 season (100%)	551	0	0	0	0
11	FIN	Kiira Korpi	2619	2007/2008 season (70%)	386	204	0	158	115
12	USA	Caroline Zhang	2610	2009/2010 season (100%)	680	292	191	0	0
12	USA	Caroline Zhang	2610	2008/2009 season (100%)	644	324	262	0	0
12	USA	Caroline Zhang	2610	2007/2008 season (70%)	451	408	252	0	0
13	USA	Mirai Nagasu	2516	2009/2010 season (100%)	875	292	262	0	0
13	USA	Mirai Nagasu	2516	2008/2009 season (100%)	0	262	191	0	0
13	USA	Mirai Nagasu	2516	2007/2008 season (70%)	405	420	175	0	0
14	JPN	Kanako Murakami	2502	2009/2010 season (100%)	715	600	250	250	0
14	JPN	Kanako Murakami	2502	2008/2009 season (100%)	0	437	250	0	0
14	JPN	Kanako Murakami	2502	2007/2008 season (70%)	0	0	0	0	0
15	GEO	Elene Gedevanishvili	2404	2009/2010 season (100%)	680	236	213	0	0
15	GEO	Elene Gedevanishvili	2404	2008/2009 season (100%)	465	213	0	250	182
15	GEO	Elene Gedevanishvili	2404	2007/2008 season (70%)	312	165	134	0	0
16	USA	Ashley Wagner	2387	2009/2010 season (100%)	0	583	360	0	0
16	USA	Ashley Wagner	2387	2008/2009 season (100%)	579	292	292	0	0
16	USA	Ashley Wagner	2387	2007/2008 season (70%)	281	227	183	0	0
17	CAN	Cynthia Phaneuf	2191	2009/2010 season (100%)	787	236	213	0	0
17	CAN	Cynthia Phaneuf	2191	2008/2009 season (100%)	551	213	191	0	0
17	CAN	Cynthia Phaneuf	2191	2007/2008 season (70%)	312	0	0	0	0
18	JPN	Yukari Nakano	2190	2009/2010 season (100%)	0	324	292	0	0
18	JPN	Yukari Nakano	2190	2008/2009 season (100%)	0	525	360	0	0
18	JPN	Yukari Nakano	2190	2007/2008 season (70%)	613	368	252	0	0
19	USA	Alissa Czisny	2186	2009/2010 season (100%)	0	360	292	250	0
19	USA	Alissa Czisny	2186	2008/2009 season (100%)	418	324	292	250	0
19	USA	Alissa Czisny	2186	2007/2008 season (70%)	0	165	0	0	0
20	JPN	Fumie Suguri	1991	2009/2010 season (100%)	0	292	213	0	0
20	JPN	Fumie Suguri	1991	2008/2009 season (100%)	574	360	324	0	0
20	JPN	Fumie Suguri	1991	2007/2008 season (70%)	228	204	183	0	0
21	EST	Elena Glebova	1975	2009/2010 season (100%)	325	262	0	182	0
21	EST	Elena Glebova	1975	2008/2009 season (100%)	264	236	0	225	182
21	EST	Elena Glebova	1975	2007/2008 season (70%)	193	165	134	0	0
21	SUI	Sarah Meier	1975	2009/2010 season (100%)	551	0	0	0	0
21	SUI	Sarah Meier	1975	2008/2009 season (100%)	517	236	0	203	0
21	SUI	Sarah Meier	1975	2007/2008 season (70%)	529	252	204	0	0
23	GER	Sarah Hecken	1943	2009/2010 season (100%)	377	191	0	0	0
23	GER	Sarah Hecken	1943	2008/2009 season (100%)	380	203	164	250	203
23	GER	Sarah Hecken	1943	2007/2008 season (70%)	239	175	0	0	0
24	SWE	Joshi Helgesson	1920	2009/2010 season (100%)	308	0	0	203	0
24	SWE	Joshi Helgesson	1920	2008/2009 season (100%)	521	133	108	225	225
24	SWE	Joshi Helgesson	1920	2007/2008 season (70%)	266	104	93	0	0
25	RUS	Ksenia Makarova	1850	2009/2010 season (100%)	574	437	225	250	0
25	RUS	Ksenia Makarova	1850	2008/2009 season (100%)	0	182	182	0	0
25	RUS	Ksenia Makarova	1850	2007/2008 season (70%)	0	0	0	0	0
26	GBR	Jenna McCorkell	1823	2009/2010 season (100%)	305	191	0	203	164
26	GBR	Jenna McCorkell	1823	2008/2009 season (100%)	362	213	0	203	182
26	GBR	Jenna McCorkell	1823	2007/2008 season (70%)	281	0	0	142	0
27	SVK	Ivana Reitmayerova	1703	2009/2010 season (100%)	192	97	0	0	0
27	SVK	Ivana Reitmayerova	1703	2008/2009 season (100%)	342	148	108	250	225
27	SVK	Ivana Reitmayerova	1703	2007/2008 season (70%)	115	68	0	158	115
28	SWE	Viktoria Helgesson	1660	2009/2010 season (100%)	465	0	0	250	164
28	SWE	Viktoria Helgesson	1660	2008/2009 season (100%)	156	0	0	250	164
28	SWE	Viktoria Helgesson	1660	2007/2008 season (70%)	140	127	84	115	0
29	ITA	Valentina Marchei	1649	2009/2010 season (100%)	402	0	0	250	225
29	ITA	Valentina Marchei	1649	2008/2009 season (100%)	0	0	0	250	0
29	ITA	Valentina Marchei	1649	2007/2008 season (70%)	347	0	0	175	0
30	FIN	Susanna Pöykiö	1634	2009/2010 season (100%)	0	0	0	0	0
30	FIN	Susanna Pöykiö	1634	2008/2009 season (100%)	680	262	236	164	0
30	FIN	Susanna Pöykiö	1634	2007/2008 season (70%)	0	134	0	158	0

==== Pairs ====
As of 6 April 2010

Rank	Nation	Couple	Points	Season	ISU Championships or Olympics	(Junior) Grand Prix and Final		Selected International Competition	
Rank	Nation	Couple	Points	Season	Best	Best	2nd Best	Best	2nd Best
1	GER	Aliona Savchenko / Robin Szolkowy	5211	2009/2010 season (100%)	1080	648	400	250	0
1	GER	Aliona Savchenko / Robin Szolkowy	5211	2008/2009 season (100%)	1200	648	400	250	0
1	GER	Aliona Savchenko / Robin Szolkowy	5211	2007/2008 season (70%)	840	560	280	175	0
2	CHN	Qing Pang / Jian Tong	4449	2009/2010 season (100%)	1200	720	400	0	0
2	CHN	Qing Pang / Jian Tong	4449	2008/2009 season (100%)	875	800	400	0	0
2	CHN	Qing Pang / Jian Tong	4449	2007/2008 season (70%)	588	454	280	0	0
3	CHN	Dan Zhang / Hao Zhang	4016	2009/2010 season (100%)	840	472	360	0	0
3	CHN	Dan Zhang / Hao Zhang	4016	2008/2009 season (100%)	1080	720	400	0	0
3	CHN	Dan Zhang / Hao Zhang	4016	2007/2008 season (70%)	756	504	280	0	0
4	RUS	Yuko Kavaguti / Alexander Smirnov	4012	2009/2010 season (100%)	972	525	360	0	0
4	RUS	Yuko Kavaguti / Alexander Smirnov	4012	2008/2009 season (100%)	972	525	400	250	0
4	RUS	Yuko Kavaguti / Alexander Smirnov	4012	2007/2008 season (70%)	613	368	227	0	0
5	RUS	Maria Mukhortova / Maxim Trankov	3702	2009/2010 season (100%)	875	583	400	0	0
5	RUS	Maria Mukhortova / Maxim Trankov	3702	2008/2009 season (100%)	787	472	360	225	0
5	RUS	Maria Mukhortova / Maxim Trankov	3702	2007/2008 season (70%)	529	227	204	0	0
6	UKR	Tatiana Volosozhar / Stanislav Morozov	3376	2009/2010 season (100%)	612	360	324	225	0
6	UKR	Tatiana Volosozhar / Stanislav Morozov	3376	2008/2009 season (100%)	709	583	360	203	0
6	UKR	Tatiana Volosozhar / Stanislav Morozov	3376	2007/2008 season (70%)	428	204	183	0	0
7	CAN	Jessica Dube / Bryce Davison	2917	2009/2010 season (100%)	709	360	324	0	0
7	CAN	Jessica Dube / Bryce Davison	2917	2008/2009 season (100%)	756	360	324	0	0
7	CAN	Jessica Dube / Bryce Davison	2917	2007/2008 season (70%)	680	408	280	0	0
8	USA	Keauna McLaughlin / Rockne Brubaker	2607	2009/2010 season (100%)	756	324	292	0	0
8	USA	Keauna McLaughlin / Rockne Brubaker	2607	2008/2009 season (100%)	551	360	324	0	0
8	USA	Keauna McLaughlin / Rockne Brubaker	2607	2007/2008 season (70%)	0	252	252	0	0
9	CAN	Meagan Duhamel / Craig Buntin	2523	2009/2010 season (100%)	680	292	0	0	0
9	CAN	Meagan Duhamel / Craig Buntin	2523	2008/2009 season (100%)	612	324	292	0	0
9	CAN	Meagan Duhamel / Craig Buntin	2523	2007/2008 season (70%)	496	165	0	158	0
10	CHN	Xue Shen / Hongbo Zhao	2400	2009/2010 season (100%)	1200	800	400	0	0
10	CHN	Xue Shen / Hongbo Zhao	2400	2008/2009 season (100%)	0	0	0	0	0
10	CHN	Xue Shen / Hongbo Zhao	2400	2007/2008 season (70%)	0	0	0	0	0
11	CHN	Yue Zhang / Lei Wang	2351	2009/2010 season (100%)	496	486	225	0	0
11	CHN	Yue Zhang / Lei Wang	2351	2008/2009 season (100%)	342	540	262	0	0
11	CHN	Yue Zhang / Lei Wang	2351	2007/2008 season (70%)	266	223	204	0	0
12	JPN	Narumi Takahashi / Mervin Tran	2336	2009/2010 season (100%)	644	540	250	0	0
12	JPN	Narumi Takahashi / Mervin Tran	2336	2008/2009 season (100%)	380	319	203	0	0
12	JPN	Narumi Takahashi / Mervin Tran	2336	2007/2008 season (70%)	115	104	0	0	0
13	RUS	Lubov Iliushechkina / Nodari Maisuradze	2320	2009/2010 season (100%)	0	262	0	0	0
13	RUS	Lubov Iliushechkina / Nodari Maisuradze	2320	2008/2009 season (100%)	715	600	292	0	0
13	RUS	Lubov Iliushechkina / Nodari Maisuradze	2320	2007/2008 season (70%)	451	0	0	0	0
14	USA	Rena Inoue / John Baldwin	2112	2009/2010 season (100%)	0	324	292	0	0
14	USA	Rena Inoue / John Baldwin	2112	2008/2009 season (100%)	446	360	262	0	0
14	USA	Rena Inoue / John Baldwin	2112	2007/2008 season (70%)	428	0	0	0	0
15	FRA	Adeline Canac / Maximin Coia	2016	2009/2010 season (100%)	325	262	0	250	0
15	FRA	Adeline Canac / Maximin Coia	2016	2008/2009 season (100%)	362	236	213	203	0
15	FRA	Adeline Canac / Maximin Coia	2016	2007/2008 season (70%)	214	165	149	0	0
16	CAN	Mylene Brodeur / John Mattatall	1937	2009/2010 season (100%)	446	262	236	0	0
16	CAN	Mylene Brodeur / John Mattatall	1937	2008/2009 season (100%)	465	292	236	0	0
16	CAN	Mylene Brodeur / John Mattatall	1937	2007/2008 season (70%)	312	0	0	0	0
17	RUS	Ksenia Krasilnikova / Konstantin Bezmaternikh	1893	2009/2010 season (100%)	0	236	0	0	0
17	RUS	Ksenia Krasilnikova / Konstantin Bezmaternikh	1893	2008/2009 season (100%)	0	486	250	0	0
17	RUS	Ksenia Krasilnikova / Konstantin Bezmaternikh	1893	2007/2008 season (70%)	501	420	183	0	0
18	USA	Caydee Denney / Jeremy Barrett	1891	2009/2010 season (100%)	638	292	262	0	0
18	USA	Caydee Denney / Jeremy Barrett	1891	2008/2009 season (100%)	517	0	0	182	0
18	USA	Caydee Denney / Jeremy Barrett	1891	2007/2008 season (70%)	0	0	0	0	0
19	GBR	Stacey Kemp / David King	1888	2009/2010 season (100%)	293	213	0	164	0
19	GBR	Stacey Kemp / David King	1888	2008/2009 season (100%)	339	292	0	250	0
19	GBR	Stacey Kemp / David King	1888	2007/2008 season (70%)	347	149	134	0	0
20	CAN	Anabelle Langlois / Cody Hay	1801	2009/2010 season (100%)	517	292	0	203	0
20	CAN	Anabelle Langlois / Cody Hay	1801	2008/2009 season (100%)	0	0	0	0	0
20	CAN	Anabelle Langlois / Cody Hay	1801	2007/2008 season (70%)	402	204	183	0	0
21	CHN	Huibo Dong / Yiming Wu	1762	2009/2010 season (100%)	402	236	236	0	0
21	CHN	Huibo Dong / Yiming Wu	1762	2008/2009 season (100%)	362	292	191	0	0
21	CHN	Huibo Dong / Yiming Wu	1762	2007/2008 season (70%)	405	93	0	0	0
22	ITA	Nicole Della Monica / Yannick Kocon	1729	2009/2010 season (100%)	496	262	0	250	0
22	ITA	Nicole Della Monica / Yannick Kocon	1729	2008/2009 season (100%)	496	0	0	225	0
22	ITA	Nicole Della Monica / Yannick Kocon	1729	2007/2008 season (70%)	127	0	0	0	0
23	USA	Marissa Castelli / Simon Shnapir	1721	2009/2010 season (100%)	325	213	0	0	0
23	USA	Marissa Castelli / Simon Shnapir	1721	2008/2009 season (100%)	579	354	182	0	0
23	USA	Marissa Castelli / Simon Shnapir	1721	2007/2008 season (70%)	0	68	0	0	0
24	USA	Amanda Evora / Mark Ladwig	1639	2009/2010 season (100%)	517	262	213	0	0
24	USA	Amanda Evora / Mark Ladwig	1639	2008/2009 season (100%)	0	292	213	0	0
24	USA	Amanda Evora / Mark Ladwig	1639	2007/2008 season (70%)	0	204	0	142	0
25	CHN	Wenjing Sui / Cong Han	1565	2009/2010 season (100%)	715	600	250	0	0
25	CHN	Wenjing Sui / Cong Han	1565	2008/2009 season (100%)	0	0	0	0	0
25	CHN	Wenjing Sui / Cong Han	1565	2007/2008 season (70%)	0	0	0	0	0
26	RUS	Anastasia Martiusheva / Alexei Rogonov	1544	2009/2010 season (100%)	0	213	0	0	0
26	RUS	Anastasia Martiusheva / Alexei Rogonov	1544	2008/2009 season (100%)	644	437	250	0	0
26	RUS	Anastasia Martiusheva / Alexei Rogonov	1544	2007/2008 season (70%)	0	0	0	0	0
27	SUI	Anaïs Morand / Antoine Dorsaz	1469	2009/2010 season (100%)	402	182	148	164	0
27	SUI	Anaïs Morand / Antoine Dorsaz	1469	2008/2009 season (100%)	305	148	120	0	0
27	SUI	Anaïs Morand / Antoine Dorsaz	1469	2007/2008 season (70%)	157	0	0	0	0
28	FRA	Vanessa James / Yannick Bonheur	1418	2009/2010 season (100%)	446	191	191	0	0
28	FRA	Vanessa James / Yannick Bonheur	1418	2008/2009 season (100%)	377	213	0	0	0
28	FRA	Vanessa James / Yannick Bonheur	1418	2007/2008 season (70%)	0	0	0	0	0
29	USA	Caitlin Yankowskas / John Coughlin	1311	2009/2010 season (100%)	612	213	0	250	0
29	USA	Caitlin Yankowskas / John Coughlin	1311	2008/2009 season (100%)	0	236	0	0	0
29	USA	Caitlin Yankowskas / John Coughlin	1311	2007/2008 season (70%)	0	0	0	0	0
30	EST	Maria Sergejeva / Ilja Glebov	1299	2009/2010 season (100%)	237	191	0	0	0
30	EST	Maria Sergejeva / Ilja Glebov	1299	2008/2009 season (100%)	224	262	148	0	0
30	EST	Maria Sergejeva / Ilja Glebov	1299	2007/2008 season (70%)	295	165	149	0	0

==== Ice dance ====
As of 26 March 2010

Rank	Nation	Couple	Points	Season	ISU Championships or Olympics	(Junior) Grand Prix and Final		Selected International Competition	
Rank	Nation	Couple	Points	Season	Best	Best	2nd Best	Best	2nd Best
1	USA	Meryl Davis / Charlie White	4453	2009/2010 season (100%)	1080	800	400	250	0
1	USA	Meryl Davis / Charlie White	4453	2008/2009 season (100%)	875	648	400	0	0
1	USA	Meryl Davis / Charlie White	4453	2007/2008 season (70%)	529	227	204	0	0
2	RUS	Oksana Domnina / Maxim Shabalin	4132	2009/2010 season (100%)	972	0	0	0	0
2	RUS	Oksana Domnina / Maxim Shabalin	4132	2008/2009 season (100%)	1200	720	400	0	0
2	RUS	Oksana Domnina / Maxim Shabalin	4132	2007/2008 season (70%)	588	560	280	0	0
3	CAN	Tessa Virtue / Scott Moir	3980	2009/2010 season (100%)	1200	720	400	0	0
3	CAN	Tessa Virtue / Scott Moir	3980	2008/2009 season (100%)	972	0	0	0	0
3	CAN	Tessa Virtue / Scott Moir	3980	2007/2008 season (70%)	756	408	280	0	0
4	FRA	Isabelle Delobel / Olivier Schoenfelder	3658	2009/2010 season (100%)	709	0	0	0	0
4	FRA	Isabelle Delobel / Olivier Schoenfelder	3658	2008/2009 season (100%)	0	800	400	0	0
4	FRA	Isabelle Delobel / Olivier Schoenfelder	3658	2007/2008 season (70%)	840	454	280	175	0
5	USA	Tanith Belbin / Benjamin Agosto	3619	2009/2010 season (100%)	875	400	400	0	0
5	USA	Tanith Belbin / Benjamin Agosto	3619	2008/2009 season (100%)	1080	360	360	0	0
5	USA	Tanith Belbin / Benjamin Agosto	3619	2007/2008 season (70%)	613	504	280	0	0
6	GBR	Sinead Kerr / John Kerr	3558	2009/2010 season (100%)	787	583	360	250	0
6	GBR	Sinead Kerr / John Kerr	3558	2008/2009 season (100%)	680	324	324	250	0
6	GBR	Sinead Kerr / John Kerr	3558	2007/2008 season (70%)	402	204	183	0	0
7	FRA	Nathalie Péchalat / Fabian Bourzat	3360	2009/2010 season (100%)	875	648	360	0	0
7	FRA	Nathalie Péchalat / Fabian Bourzat	3360	2008/2009 season (100%)	787	360	324	0	0
7	FRA	Nathalie Péchalat / Fabian Bourzat	3360	2007/2008 season (70%)	447	330	252	0	0
8	ITA	Federica Faiella / Massimo Scali	3262	2009/2010 season (100%)	972	324	0	0	0
8	ITA	Federica Faiella / Massimo Scali	3262	2008/2009 season (100%)	756	583	400	0	0
8	ITA	Federica Faiella / Massimo Scali	3262	2007/2008 season (70%)	551	227	227	0	0
9	RUS	Jana Khokhlova / Sergei Novitski	2972	2009/2010 season (100%)	680	360	292	0	0
9	RUS	Jana Khokhlova / Sergei Novitski	2972	2008/2009 season (100%)	840	400	324	0	0
9	RUS	Jana Khokhlova / Sergei Novitski	2972	2007/2008 season (70%)	680	368	252	0	0
10	ISR	Alexandra Zaretsky / Roman Zaretsky	2832	2009/2010 season (100%)	709	324	262	250	225
10	ISR	Alexandra Zaretsky / Roman Zaretsky	2832	2008/2009 season (100%)	339	262	213	225	0
10	ISR	Alexandra Zaretsky / Roman Zaretsky	2832	2007/2008 season (70%)	362	204	149	0	0
11	USA	Emily Samuelson / Evan Bates	2733	2009/2010 season (100%)	517	292	262	0	0
11	USA	Emily Samuelson / Evan Bates	2733	2008/2009 season (100%)	680	324	292	250	0
11	USA	Emily Samuelson / Evan Bates	2733	2007/2008 season (70%)	501	378	175	0	0
12	CAN	Vanessa Crone / Paul Poirier	2712	2009/2010 season (100%)	638	472	324	0	0
12	CAN	Vanessa Crone / Paul Poirier	2712	2008/2009 season (100%)	612	360	292	0	0
12	CAN	Vanessa Crone / Paul Poirier	2712	2007/2008 season (70%)	451	306	175	0	0
13	USA	Madison Chock / Greg Zuerlein	2628	2009/2010 season (100%)	551	236	191	0	0
13	USA	Madison Chock / Greg Zuerlein	2628	2008/2009 season (100%)	715	600	250	0	0
13	USA	Madison Chock / Greg Zuerlein	2628	2007/2008 season (70%)	0	276	175	0	0
14	USA	Maia Shibutani / Alex Shibutani	2588	2009/2010 season (100%)	521	486	250	0	0
14	USA	Maia Shibutani / Alex Shibutani	2588	2008/2009 season (100%)	644	437	250	0	0
14	USA	Maia Shibutani / Alex Shibutani	2588	2007/2008 season (70%)	0	0	0	0	0
15	ITA	Anna Cappellini / Luca Lanotte	2516	2009/2010 season (100%)	496	525	360	0	0
15	ITA	Anna Cappellini / Luca Lanotte	2516	2008/2009 season (100%)	551	292	292	0	0
15	ITA	Anna Cappellini / Luca Lanotte	2516	2007/2008 season (70%)	326	252	204	0	0
16	USA	Madison Hubbell / Keiffer Hubbell	2418	2009/2010 season (100%)	680	236	191	0	0
16	USA	Madison Hubbell / Keiffer Hubbell	2418	2008/2009 season (100%)	521	540	250	0	0
16	USA	Madison Hubbell / Keiffer Hubbell	2418	2007/2008 season (70%)	328	0	0	0	0
17	CAN	Kaitlyn Weaver / Andrew Poje	2400	2009/2010 season (100%)	840	324	236	0	0
17	CAN	Kaitlyn Weaver / Andrew Poje	2400	2008/2009 season (100%)	551	236	213	0	0
17	CAN	Kaitlyn Weaver / Andrew Poje	2400	2007/2008 season (70%)	386	165	149	0	0
18	CAN	Kharis Ralph / Asher Hill	2206	2009/2010 season (100%)	496	437	225	0	0
18	CAN	Kharis Ralph / Asher Hill	2206	2008/2009 season (100%)	469	354	225	0	0
18	CAN	Kharis Ralph / Asher Hill	2206	2007/2008 season (70%)	239	127	93	0	0
19	RUS	Kristina Gorshkova / Vitali Butikov	2165	2009/2010 season (100%)	0	213	213	225	0
19	RUS	Kristina Gorshkova / Vitali Butikov	2165	2008/2009 season (100%)	0	292	262	225	203
19	RUS	Kristina Gorshkova / Vitali Butikov	2165	2007/2008 season (70%)	405	340	175	0	0
20	USA	Kimberly Navarro / Brent Bommentre	1968	2009/2010 season (100%)	305	262	236	0	0
20	USA	Kimberly Navarro / Brent Bommentre	1968	2008/2009 season (100%)	496	262	236	0	0
20	USA	Kimberly Navarro / Brent Bommentre	1968	2007/2008 season (70%)	476	165	165	0	0
21	RUS	Ekaterina Bobrova / Dmitri Soloviev	1923	2009/2010 season (100%)	574	292	292	0	0
21	RUS	Ekaterina Bobrova / Dmitri Soloviev	1923	2008/2009 season (100%)	0	292	236	0	0
21	RUS	Ekaterina Bobrova / Dmitri Soloviev	1923	2007/2008 season (70%)	237	204	183	0	0
22	UKR	Anna Zadorozhniuk / Sergei Verbillo	1865	2009/2010 season (100%)	402	292	236	0	0
22	UKR	Anna Zadorozhniuk / Sergei Verbillo	1865	2008/2009 season (100%)	446	262	191	0	0
22	UKR	Anna Zadorozhniuk / Sergei Verbillo	1865	2007/2008 season (70%)	205	227	165	0	0
23	CHN	Xintong Huang / Xun Zheng	1846	2009/2010 season (100%)	612	262	213	164	0
23	CHN	Xintong Huang / Xun Zheng	1846	2008/2009 season (100%)	446	0	0	0	0
23	CHN	Xintong Huang / Xun Zheng	1846	2007/2008 season (70%)	253	149	0	0	0
24	RUS	Ksenia Monko / Kirill Khaliavin	1796	2009/2010 season (100%)	579	600	250	0	0
24	RUS	Ksenia Monko / Kirill Khaliavin	1796	2008/2009 season (100%)	0	203	164	0	0
24	RUS	Ksenia Monko / Kirill Khaliavin	1796	2007/2008 season (70%)	0	142	142	0	0
25	RUS	Ekaterina Rubleva / Ivan Shefer	1776	2009/2010 season (100%)	339	324	262	0	0
25	RUS	Ekaterina Rubleva / Ivan Shefer	1776	2008/2009 season (100%)	402	236	213	0	0
25	RUS	Ekaterina Rubleva / Ivan Shefer	1776	2007/2008 season (70%)	193	149	134	0	0
26	CZE	Lucie Myslivečková / Matej Novák	1712	2009/2010 season (100%)	247	213	0	225	0
26	CZE	Lucie Myslivečková / Matej Novák	1712	2008/2009 season (100%)	342	203	182	0	0
26	CZE	Lucie Myslivečková / Matej Novák	1712	2007/2008 season (70%)	157	158	127	142	0
27	LTU	Katherine Copely / Deividas Stagniūnas	1685	2009/2010 season (100%)	0	191	0	203	0
27	LTU	Katherine Copely / Deividas Stagniūnas	1685	2008/2009 season (100%)	325	236	191	0	0
27	LTU	Katherine Copely / Deividas Stagniūnas	1685	2007/2008 season (70%)	214	183	0	142	0
28	ITA	Lorenza Alessandrini / Simone Vaturi	1657	2009/2010 season (100%)	469	319	225	0	0
28	ITA	Lorenza Alessandrini / Simone Vaturi	1657	2008/2009 season (100%)	308	203	133	0	0
28	ITA	Lorenza Alessandrini / Simone Vaturi	1657	2007/2008 season (70%)	0	104	104	0	0
29	CAN	Allie Hann-McCurdy / Michael Coreno	1625	2009/2010 season (100%)	756	191	0	0	0
29	CAN	Allie Hann-McCurdy / Michael Coreno	1625	2008/2009 season (100%)	0	0	0	0	0
29	CAN	Allie Hann-McCurdy / Michael Coreno	1625	2007/2008 season (70%)	347	204	0	127	0
30	GER	Carolina Hermann / Daniel Hermann	1599	2009/2010 season (100%)	131	213	0	225	182
30	GER	Carolina Hermann / Daniel Hermann	1599	2008/2009 season (100%)	264	0	0	225	225
30	GER	Carolina Hermann / Daniel Hermann	1599	2007/2008 season (70%)	0	134	0	158	115
