= 2010 European Figure Skating Championships =

Figure skating competition

- Type: ISU Championship
- Date: 18 January – 24
- Season: 2009–10
- Location: Tallinn, Estonia
- Host: Estonian Skating Union
- Venue: Saku Suurhall Arena

Champions
- Men's singles: (Russia) Evgeni Plushenko
- Ladies' singles: (Italy) Carolina Kostner
- Pairs: (Russia) Yuko Kavaguti / Alexander Smirnov
- Ice dance: (Russia) Oksana Domnina / Maxim Shabalin
- Previous: 2009 European Championships
- Next: 2011 European Championships

The 2010 European Figure Skating Championships was a senior international figure skating competition in the 2009–10 season. Medals were awarded in the disciplines of men's singles, ladies' singles, pair skating, and ice dancing. The event was held at the Saku Suurhall Arena in Tallinn, Estonia from 18 to 24 January 2010.

== Qualification ==
The competition was open to skaters from European ISU member nations who had reached the age of 15 before 1 July 2009. The corresponding competition for non-European skaters were the 2010 Four Continents Championships. National associations selected their entries based on their own criteria. Based on the results of the 2009 European Championships, each country was allowed between one and three entries per discipline. The following countries earned more than the minimum.

Spots	Men	Ladies	Pairs	Dance
3	France; Italy	Finland; Russia	Germany; Russia	France; Italy; Russia
2	Belgium; Czech Republic; Russia; Sweden	Germany (United Kingdom) Great Britain; Hungary; Italy; Turkey	France (United Kingdom) Great Britain; Italy; Ukraine	Azerbaijan (United Kingdom) Great Britain; Lithuania; Ukraine

== Schedule ==
All times are Eastern European Time (UTC+2).

- Tuesday, 19 January
  - 13:30 Ice dancing – Compulsory dance
  - 18:45 Opening ceremony
  - 19:20 Pairs – Short program
- Wednesday, 20 January
  - 11:00 Men – Short program
  - 19:00 Pairs – Free skating (group 1)
  - 20:30 Pairs – Free skating (group 2 to 4)
- Thursday, 21 January
  - 13:00 Ice dancing – Original dance
  - 18:45 Men – Free skating (group 1)
  - 20:15 Men – Free skating (group 2 to 4)
- Friday, 22 January
  - 10:00 Ladies – Short Program
  - 18:40 Ice dancing – Free dance (group 1)
  - 20:00 Ice dancing – Free dance (group 2 to 4)
- Saturday, 23 January
  - 13:30 Ladies – Free skating (group 1)
  - 15:00 Ladies – Free skating (group 2 to 4)
  - 20:00 Closing reception
- Sunday, 24 January
  - 15:30 Exhibition gala

== Medals table ==
Rank	Nation	Gold	Silver	Bronze	Total
1	Russia (RUS)	3	0	2	5
2	Italy (ITA)	1	1	0	2
3	Finland (FIN)	0	1	0	1
3	Germany (GER)	0	1	0	1
3	Switzerland (SUI)	0	1	0	1
6	France (FRA)	0	0	1	1
6	Georgia (GEO)	0	0	1	1
Totals (7 entries)		4	4	4	12

== Competition notes ==
In the men's short program, Evgeni Plushenko set a new world record of 91.30 points. He won his sixth European title. Stéphane Lambiel won his third European silver medal and Brian Joubert won his 9th consecutive European medal. In ladies, Carolina Kostner won her third European title, defeating the reigning champion Laura Lepistö, who won her third European medal. Elene Gedevanishvili won Georgia's first medal at an ISU Championships.

In pair skating, Yuko Kavaguti / Alexander Smirnov won their first European title, edging out defending champions Aliona Savchenko / Robin Szolkowy. In the free skate, they set a new free skate world record of 139.23 points, only to have their record broken by the Chinese silver medallists Pang Qing / Tong Jian at the 2010 Olympic Games. In ice dancing, Oksana Domnina / Maxim Shabalin won their second European title, after previously winning in 2008. Federica Faiella / Massimo Scali won their second straight silver medals while the defending champions, Jana Khokhlova / Sergei Novitski, dropped to third.

== Results ==
=== Men ===
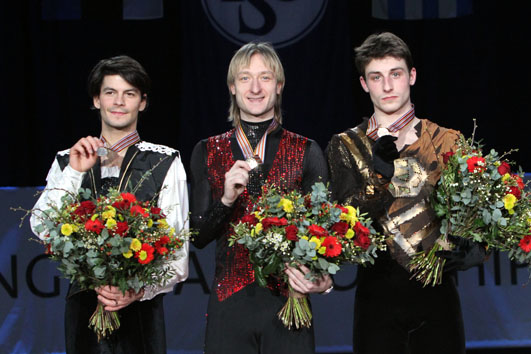
The men's podium at the 2010 European Championships. From left: Stéphane Lambiel (2nd), Evgeni Plushenko (1st), Brian Joubert (3rd).

Rank	Name	Nation	Total points	SP		FS	
1	Evgeni Plushenko	Russia	255.39	1	91.30	1	164.09
2	Stéphane Lambiel	Switzerland	238.54	5	77.75	2	160.79
3	Brian Joubert	France	236.45	2	88.55	3	147.90
4	Michal Březina	Czech Republic	224.74	4	79.60	5	145.14
5	Samuel Contesti	Italy	221.33	7	75.90	4	145.43
6	Yannick Ponsero	France	219.52	3	82.40	7	137.12
7	Alban Préaubert	France	207.61	6	76.37	9	131.24
8	Javier Fernández	Spain	204.83	13	66.50	6	138.33
9	Stefan Lindemann	Germany	203.95	9	70.19	8	133.76
10	Tomáš Verner	Czech Republic	203.18	8	72.75	10	130.43
11	Kevin van der Perren	Belgium	195.48	11	67.72	11	127.76
12	Adrian Schultheiss	Sweden	188.79	12	66.55	13	122.24
13	Anton Kovalevski	Ukraine	186.84	14	65.20	14	121.64
14	Sergei Voronov	Russia	185.38	17	60.27	12	125.11
15	Kristoffer Berntsson	Sweden	183.10	10	69.20	17	113.90
16	Paolo Bacchini	Italy	181.42	16	60.90	15	120.52
17	Viktor Pfeifer	Austria	178.41	15	63.42	16	114.99
18	Gregor Urbas	Slovenia	163.84	20	56.90	18	106.94
19	Zoltán Kelemen	Romania	161.10	18	59.40	20	101.70
20	Jorik Hendrickx	Belgium	161.06	19	58.70	19	102.36
Did not advance to free skating
21	Maciej Cieplucha	Poland		21	56.45		
22	Ari-Pekka Nurmenkari	Finland		22	53.55		
23	Karel Zelenka	Italy		23	53.09		
24	Peter Reitmayer	Slovakia		24	51.35		
25	Maxim Shipov	Israel		25	51.21		
26	Boris Martinec	Croatia		26	50.49		
27	Matthew Parr	United Kingdom		27	49.02		
28	Damjan Ostojič	Bosnia and Herzegovina		28	47.96		
29	Viktor Romanenkov	Estonia		29	47.60		
30	Alexandr Kazakov	Belarus		30	45.97		
31	Kutay Eryoldaş	Turkey		31	37.40		
32	Boyito Mulder	Netherlands		32	36.38		
33	Marton Marko	Hungary		33	35.32		
34	Saulius Ambrulevičius	Lithuania		34	34.49		
35	Girts Jekabsons	Latvia		35	32.67		
36	Georgi Kenchadze	Bulgaria		36	32.02		
37	Pierre Balian	Armenia		37	31.82		
WD	Joffrey Bourdon	Montenegro					

=== Ladies ===
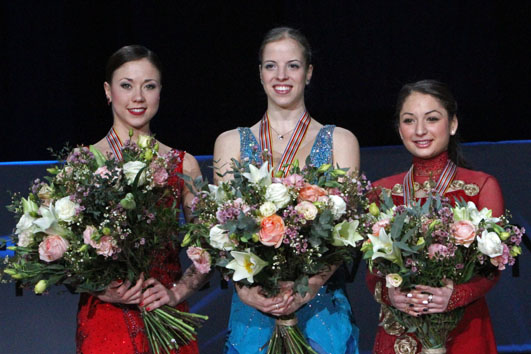
The ladies podium at the 2010 European Championships. From left: Laura Lepistö (2nd), Carolina Kostner(1st), Elene Gedevanishvili(3rd).

Rank	Name	Nation	Total points	SP		FS	
1	Carolina Kostner	Italy	173.46	1	65.80	1	107.66
2	Laura Lepistö	Finland	166.37	3	62.96	3	103.41
3	Elene Gedevanishvili	Georgia	164.54	4	60.82	2	103.72
4	Kiira Korpi	Finland	163.68	2	64.26	5	99.42
5	Sarah Meier	Switzerland	157.44	8	54.86	4	102.58
6	Júlia Sebestyén	Hungary	156.77	6	57.44	6	99.33
7	Alena Leonova	Russia	153.57	5	58.26	7	95.31
8	Valentina Marchei	Italy	149.46	7	55.34	8	94.12
9	Ksenia Makarova	Russia	146.85	9	54.06	9	92.79
10	Jelena Glebova	Estonia	138.93	13	50.10	10	88.83
11	Viktoria Helgesson	Sweden	137.10	12	50.86	12	86.24
12	Tuğba Karademir	Turkey	136.42	10	53.88	13	82.54
13	Oksana Gozeva	Russia	135.39	14	47.26	11	88.13
14	Jenna McCorkell	United Kingdom	128.06	11	53.80	17	74.26
15	Ivana Reitmayerová	Slovakia	125.31	15	47.06	14	78.25
16	Sarah Hecken	Germany	121.79	16	46.34	16	75.45
17	Sonia Lafuente	Spain	121.15	17	45.26	15	75.89
18	Natalia Popova	Ukraine	113.35	20	44.30	18	69.05
19	Teodora Poštič	Slovenia	113.35	19	44.46	19	68.89
WD	Susanna Pöykiö	Finland	44.68	18	44.68		
Did not advance to free skating
21	Tamar Katz	Israel		21	43.70		
22	Katsiarina Pakhamovich	Belarus		22	43.54		
23	Karly Robertson	United Kingdom		23	41.74		
24	Shira Willner	Germany		24	38.10		
25	Miriam Ziegler	Austria		25	36.06		
26	Mirna Libric	Croatia		26	35.74		
27	Martina Boček	Czech Republic		27	35.08		
28	Manouk Gijsman	Netherlands		28	34.96		
29	Erle Harstad	Norway		29	34.82		
30	Birce Atabey	Turkey		30	33.76		
31	Katherine Hadford	Hungary		31	32.66		
32	Karina Johnson	Denmark		32	32.16		
33	Isabelle Pieman	Belgium		33	30.32		
34	Fleur Maxwell	Luxembourg		34	30.18		
35	Beatričė Rožinskaitė	Lithuania		35	29.60		
36	Clara Peters	Ireland		36	29.42		
37	Sabina Paquier	Romania		37	29.38		
38	Marina Seeh	Serbia		38	29.32		
39	Žanna Pugača	Latvia		39	29.04		
40	Sonia Radeva	Bulgaria		40	26.64		
41	Maria Papasotiriou	Greece		41	23.02		
WD	Joelle Forte	Azerbaijan					
WD	Sonja Mugoša	Montenegro					

=== Pairs ===
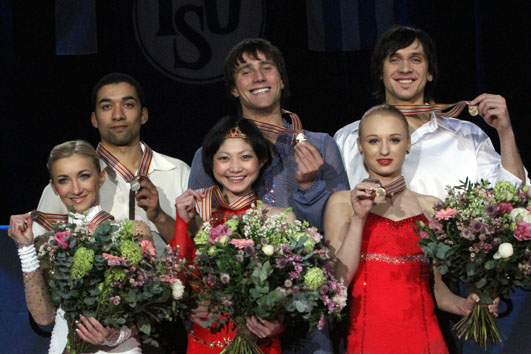
The pairs podium at the 2010 European Championships. From left: Aliona Savchenko / Robin Szolkowy (2nd), Yuko Kavaguti / Alexander Smirnov (1st), Maria Mukhortova / Maxim Trankov (3rd).

Rank	Name	Nation	Total points	SP		FS	
1	Yuko Kavaguti / Alexander Smirnov	Russia	213.15	2	73.92	1	139.23
2	Aliona Savchenko / Robin Szolkowy	Germany	211.72	1	74.12	2	137.60
3	Maria Mukhortova / Maxim Trankov	Russia	202.03	3	73.54	3	128.49
4	Tatiana Volosozhar / Stanislav Morozov	Ukraine	187.83	4	67.60	4	120.23
5	Vera Bazarova / Yuri Larionov	Russia	159.84	5	55.84	6	104.00
6	Nicole Della Monica / Yannick Kocon	Italy	156.80	6	52.64	5	104.16
7	Vanessa James / Yannick Bonheur	France	151.28	7	52.04	7	99.24
8	Anaïs Morand / Antoine Dorsaz	Switzerland	144.95	11	47.88	8	97.07
9	Maylin Hausch / Daniel Wende	Germany	142.76	9	50.66	9	92.10
10	Adeline Canac / Maximin Coia	France	139.73	8	51.24	11	88.49
11	Stacey Kemp / David King	United Kingdom	137.29	13	45.26	10	92.03
12	Erica Risseeuw / Robert Paxton	United Kingdom	130.09	14	43.50	12	86.59
13	Maria Sergejeva / Ilja Glebov	Estonia	129.46	12	47.60	13	81.86
14	Joanna Sulej / Mateusz Chruściński	Poland	124.79	10	48.38	15	76.41
15	Jessica Crenshaw / Chad Tsagris	Greece	115.59	16	36.60	14	78.99
16	Nina Ivanova / Filip Zalevski	Bulgaria	106.31	15	38.56	16	67.75
Did not advance to free skating
17	Lubov Bakirova / Mikalai Kamianchuk	Belarus		17	36.18		
18	Danielle Montalbano / Evgeni Krasnopolski	Israel		18	30.90		
19	Gabriela Čermanová / Martin Hanulák	Slovakia		19	30.04		
20	Viktória Hacht / Kristóf Trefil	Hungary		20	29.34		
WD	Marika Zanforlin / Federico Degli Esposti	Italy					

=== Ice dancing ===
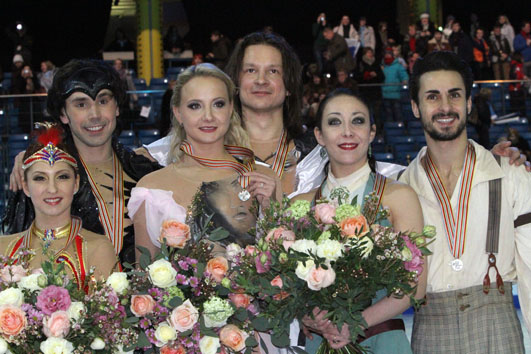
The ice dancing podium at the 2010 European Championships. From left: Jana Khokhlova / Sergei Novitski (3rd), Oksana Domnina / Maxim Shabalin (1st), Federica Faiella / Massimo Scali (2nd).

Rank	Name	Nation	Total points	CD		OD		FD	
1	Oksana Domnina / Maxim Shabalin	Russia	199.25	1	42.78	2	61.49	2	94.98
2	Federica Faiella / Massimo Scali	Italy	195.86	3	37.47	1	61.68	1	96.71
3	Jana Khokhlova / Sergei Novitski	Russia	189.67	2	37.87	4	58.59	3	93.21
4	Nathalie Péchalat / Fabian Bourzat	France	188.51	5	36.36	3	60.08	4	92.07
5	Sinead Kerr / John Kerr	United Kingdom	184.05	4	36.76	5	57.05	5	90.24
6	Anna Cappellini / Luca Lanotte	Italy	176.10	6	35.93	9	52.83	6	87.34
7	Alexandra Zaretsky / Roman Zaretsky	Israel	174.91	7	34.63	6	55.92	9	84.36
8	Anna Zadorozhniuk / Sergei Verbillo	Ukraine	171.28	9	32.60	7	54.30	8	84.38
9	Ekaterina Bobrova / Dmitri Soloviev	Russia	171.26	8	33.33	8	53.03	7	84.90
10	Nóra Hoffmann / Maxim Zavozin	Hungary	163.21	11	31.53	11	50.02	10	81.66
11	Alla Beknazarova / Vladimir Zuev	Ukraine	162.82	10	32.15	10	51.22	12	79.45
12	Pernelle Carron / Lloyd Jones	France	159.52	12	29.96	12	49.85	11	79.71
13	Caitlin Mallory / Kristjan Rand	Estonia	155.93	15	29.16	15	47.33	13	79.44
14	Zoé Blanc / Pierre-Loup Bouquet	France	147.56	17	27.82	13	48.80	14	70.94
15	Christina Beier / William Beier	Germany	147.36	13	29.41	14	48.45	16	69.50
16	Penny Coomes / Nicholas Buckland	United Kingdom	145.91	16	28.63	16	46.98	15	70.30
Did not advance to free dance
17	Kira Geil / Dmitri Matsjuk	Austria	71.73	14	29.16	19	42.57		
18	Kamila Hájková / David Vincour	Czech Republic	71.21	18	25.88	17	45.33		
19	Allison Reed / Otar Japaridze	Georgia	66.28	22	22.59	18	43.69		
20	Nikola Višňová / Lukáš Csolley	Slovakia	64.57	21	22.61	20	41.96		
21	Katelyn Good / Nikolaj Sorensen	Denmark	63.13	20	22.84	21	40.29		
22	Federica Testa / Christopher Mior	Italy	61.88	19	23.31	24	38.57		
23	Nikki Georgiadis / Graham Hockley	Greece	59.98	24	21.18	23	38.80		
24	Oksana Klimova / Sasha Palomäki	Finland	59.85	25	20.99	22	38.86		
25	Ramona Elsener / Florian Roost	Switzerland	59.28	23	21.84	25	37.44		
26	Lesia Valadzenkava / Vitali Vakunov	Belarus	50.11	26	17.08	26	33.03		
WD	Virginiya Hoptman / Pavel Filchenkov	Azerbaijan							
