= Adrian Schultheiss =

Swedish figure skater (born 1988)

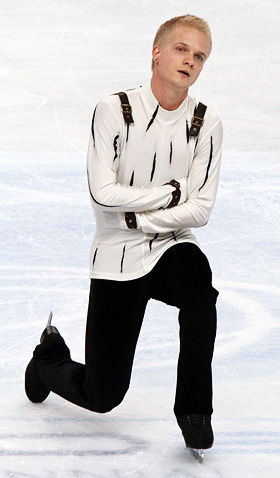
- Schultheiss in 2010.

Personal information
- Full name: Adrian Alexander Konstantin Schultheiss
- Born: 11 August 1988 (age 38) Kungsbacka, Sweden
- Home town: Gothenburg, Sweden
- Height: 1.73 m (5 ft 8 in)

Figure skating career
- Country: Sweden
- Coach: Maria Bergqvist; Joanna Dahlstrand
- Skating club: Lerum
- Began skating: 1991

Adrian Alexander Konstantin Schultheiss (born 11 August 1988) is a Swedish former competitive figure skater. He is the 2006 Swedish national champion, the 2004–2005 Swedish junior national champion, and the 2006 Nordic Champion. He is the first Swedish skater to win a Junior Grand Prix event, which he did in 2005.

== Career ==
Adrian Schultheiss was born in Kungsbacka, Sweden and began skating at the age of three. He was the Swedish novice champion in 2002 before debuting internationally the next season. Schultheiss skated as a junior through the end of the 2008 season, although by 2005 he had already begun competing as a senior in some international events. In 2006, Schultheiss won the Swedish National championships. In 2007–08, he skated in both senior and junior events and finished a career-best 6th at the 2008 Europeans. He was 13th at 2008 Worlds. The next season, he was 18th at both events.

Schultheiss was selected to represent Sweden at the 2010 Winter Olympics based on his showing at the 2010 Europeans; he finished 15th at the Olympics. At the 2010 Worlds, he skated a strong long program with a quadruple toe loop to finish in the top ten for the first time in his career.

Schultheiss is known for choosing unusual concepts for his programs, most notably his craziness-themed 2009–10 long program, which he skated wearing a straitjacket costume. He has stated that "it's more interesting and important when people try to make some difference from all points of view" and that "if you watch the classical [music]... people get bored easy. You need variation. That's what I'm trying to show."

Schultheiss is the first skater from Sweden to land a quadruple jump in competition, first at the 2010 Winter Olympics in Vancouver and later at the 2010 Worlds.

Schultheiss parted ways with coach Evgeni Loutkov after 2010 Skate America and began working with Johanna Dahlstrand and Maria Bergqvist. As part of his preparation for the 2011–12 season, he spent eight weeks in Delaware with coach Priscilla Hill. He missed the Swedish Championships due to a back injury and underwent surgery the week before Christmas.

== Programs ==
Season	Short program	Free skating
2012–2013	DubseEpic Symph by Robot Boys; Jenova Project by DatsiK; Beta by Robot Boys	Samuel; Avant La Pluie (partie II); Avant La Pluie (Chykidec' Remix) by René Aubry; Cry by Michael Ortega
2011–2012	Nuclear Warhead by Black Violin	Romeo and Julieta by Raúl Di Blasio; Romeo and Juliet by D. Malikov, Sergei Prokofiev
2010–2011	Nuclear Warhead by Black Violin; Scuba (Amon Tobin remix) by Bonobo	Romeo and Julieta by Raúl Di Blasio; Romeo and Juliet by D. Malikov, Sergei Prokofiev
2009–2010	My Way; Christmas Fantasy by David Mnatsakanyan	Teardrop by Massive Attack; Insane in the Brain by Cypress Hill; Smack My Bitch Up by Prodigy
2008–2009	Detective by Edgar	Hypnotic; Peuton by Edgar; Peer Gynt by Edvard Grieg
2007–2008	Electronic Violin	Mr. & Mrs. Smith by John Powell
2006–2007	Moonlight Sonata by Ludwig van Beethoven	Equinoxe by Jean-Michel Jarre; Music by Yanni; Equinoxe by Jean Michel Jarre
2005–2006	Toccata and Fugue in D Minor by Johann Sebastian Bach (modern version)	Equinoxe by Jean-Michel Jarre; Music by Yanni; Equinoxe by Jean Michel Jarre
2004–2005	Toccata and Fugue in D Minor by Johann Sebastian Bach (modern version)	Dragon Theme (from Dragon: The Bruce Lee Story) by Randy Edelman
2003–2004	Sarabande by George Frideric Handel	Conan the Barbarian by Basil Poledouris; The 7th Voyage of Sinbad by Bernard Herrmann
2002–2003	Alf leila We Leila (A Thousand and One Nights) by Baligh Hamdi; Hayart Albimaak (You Bewildered My Heart) by Riadel Soumbati, Ahmed Ramy	Conan the Barbarian by Basil Poledouris; The 7th Voyage of Sinbad by Bernard Herrmann

== Competitive highlights ==
Schultheiss at the 2008 World Championships.

GP: Grand Prix; JGP: Junior Grand Prix

International
Event	02–03	03–04	04–05	05–06	06–07	07–08	08–09	09–10	10–11	11–12
Olympics								15th		
Worlds						13th	18th	9th	25th	
Europeans				20th		6th	18th	12th	13th	
GP Cup of Russia								6th		
GP NHK Trophy							7th		10th	
GP Skate America							7th	7th	7th	
Crystal Skate								2nd		
Finlandia Trophy										5th
Golden Spin						2nd	6th	3rd		
Nepela Memorial									4th	
Nordics			2nd	1st	2nd				2nd	
International: Junior
Junior Worlds	19th	23rd	13th	16th	14th	18th				
JGP Final				9th						
JGP Andorra				2nd						
JGP Austria						4th				
JGP Bulgaria		WD				6th				
JGP Croatia				1st						
JGP Czech Rep.					5th					
JGP Germany			6th							
JGP Italy	17th									
JGP Norway					6th					
JGP Poland		10th								
JGP United States			6th							
National
Swedish Champ.	2nd J	1st J	1st J	1st	2nd	2nd	WD	2nd	2nd	

== Detailed results ==
2010–2011 season
Date	Event	SP	FS	Total
12–13 November 2010	2010 Skate America	7; 63.71	9; 124.49	7; 188.20
22–24 October 2010	2010 NHK Trophy	10; 62.24	11; 119.23	10; 181.47
2009–2010 season
Date	Event	SP	FS	Total
22–28 March 2010	2010 ISU World Championships	12; 72.35	7; 145.91	9; 218.26
14–27 February 2010	2010 Winter Olympic Games	22; 63.13	13; 137.31	15; 200.44
