= Four Nationals Figure Skating Championships =

Recurring figure skating competition

- Status: Active
- Genre: National championships
- Frequency: Annual
- Country: Czech Republic; Hungary; Poland; Slovakia
- Previous event: 2026 Four Nationals Championships
- Next event: 2027 Four Nationals Championships
- Organizer: Czech Figure Skating Association; Hungarian National Skating Federation; Polish Figure Skating Association; Slovak Figure Skating Association

The Four Nationals Figure Skating Championships are an annual figure skating competition organized by the Czech Figure Skating Association, Hungarian National Skating Federation, Polish Figure Skating Association, and Slovak Figure Skating Association. The genesis of this competition was in 2006, when the skating federations of the Czech Republic and Slovakia held their national championships together as one unified competition. Poland joined in 2008 and the competition was named the Three Nationals Figure Skating Championships. Hungary joined in 2013; hence the Four Nationals Figure Skating Championships. Medals are awarded in men's singles, women's singles, pair skating, and ice dance at the senior level, and in pair skating and ice dance at the junior level, although not every discipline is held every year due to a lack of participants. The results are then split to form national podiums for each nation.

Tomáš Verner of the Czech Republic currently holds the record for winning the most championship titles in men's singles (with six), while Ekaterina Kurakova of Poland holds the record in women's singles (with seven). Maria Pavlova and Alexei Sviatchenko of Hungary hold the record in pair skating (with three), while Ioulia Chtchetinina of Poland and Márk Magyar of Hungary have also each won three championship titles in pair skating, and while two of those titles were won together, the others were won with different partners. Natalia Kaliszek and Maksym Spodyriev of Poland hold the record in ice dance (with six).

== History ==
After the dissolution of Czechoslovakia in 1992, the Czech Skating Association and the Slovak Figure Skating Association ran independent national championships until the 2006–07 season, when the two associations joined their national championships together as one event. The inaugural Czech and Slovak Figure Skating Championships were held in Liberec in the Czech Republic. Tomáš Verner of the Czech Republic won the men's event, while Igor Macypura was the highest ranked Slovak men's singles skater. Ivana Reitmayerová of Slovakia won the women's event, while Nella Simaová was the highest ranked Czech women's singles skater. Kamila Hájková and David Vincour of the Czech Republic were the only entrants in the ice dance event. The Czech Republic and Slovakia alternated as hosts for the combined championships until the 2008–09 season, when Poland joined and the Three Nationals Figure Skating Championships were officially formed. Since Hungary joined during the 2013–14 season, the event has been known as the Four Nationals Figure Skating Championships. The four nations rotate as hosts, while skaters from the four countries compete together and the results are then split at the end of the competition to form national podiums.

In 2021, Hungary held their own national championships when the COVID-19 pandemic made travel to the 2021 Four Nationals Championships in Cieszyn, Poland, unfeasible.

== Senior medalists ==
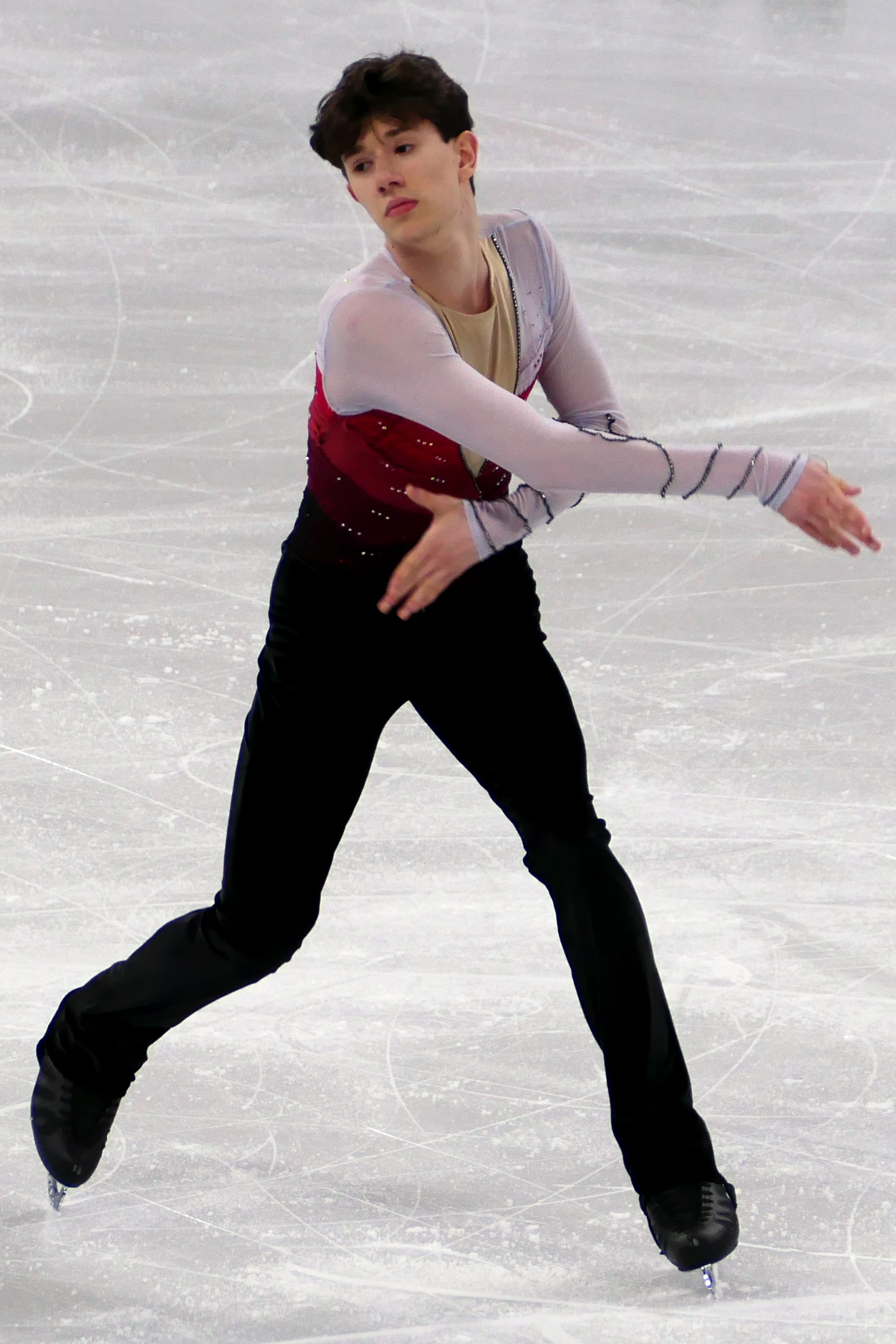
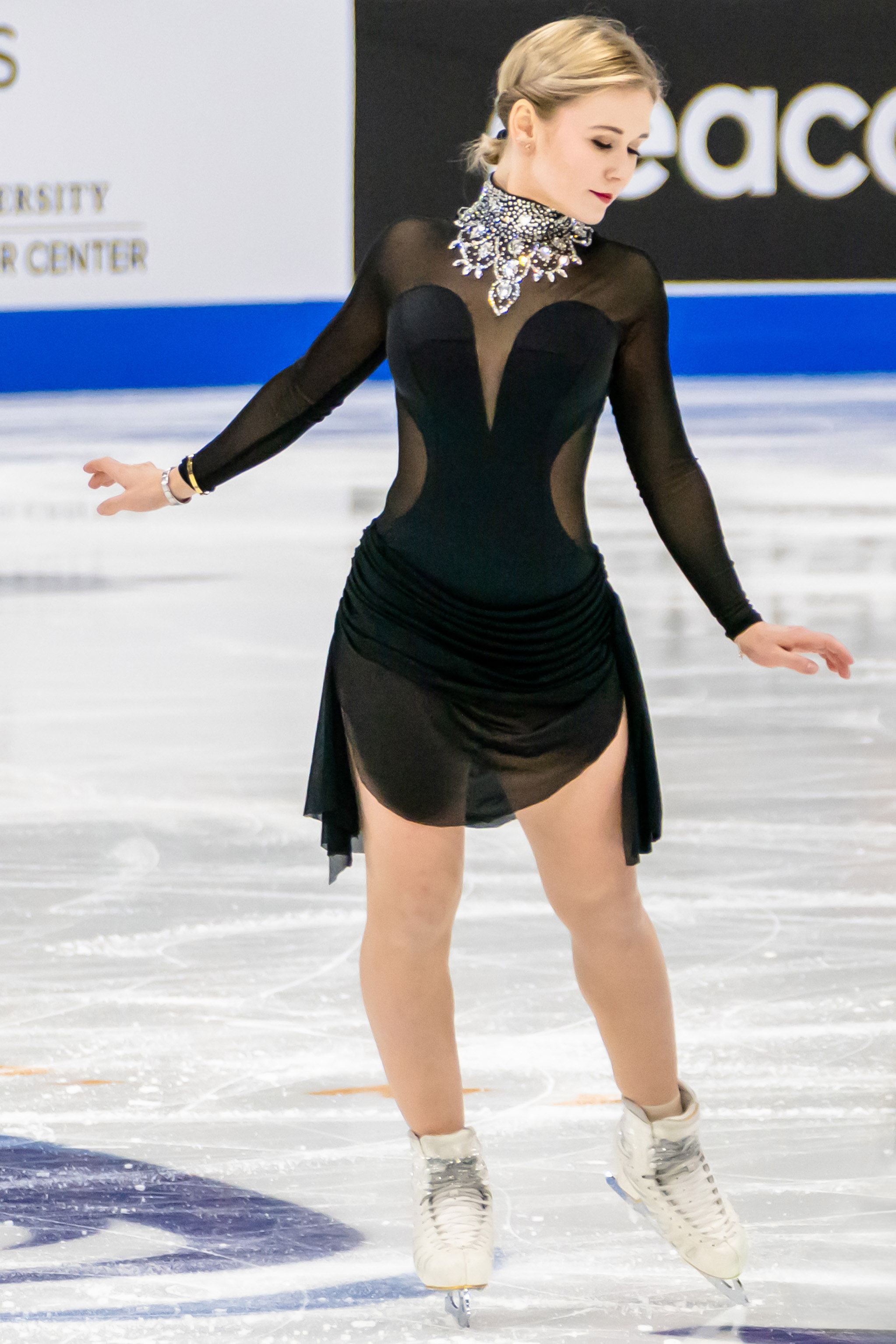
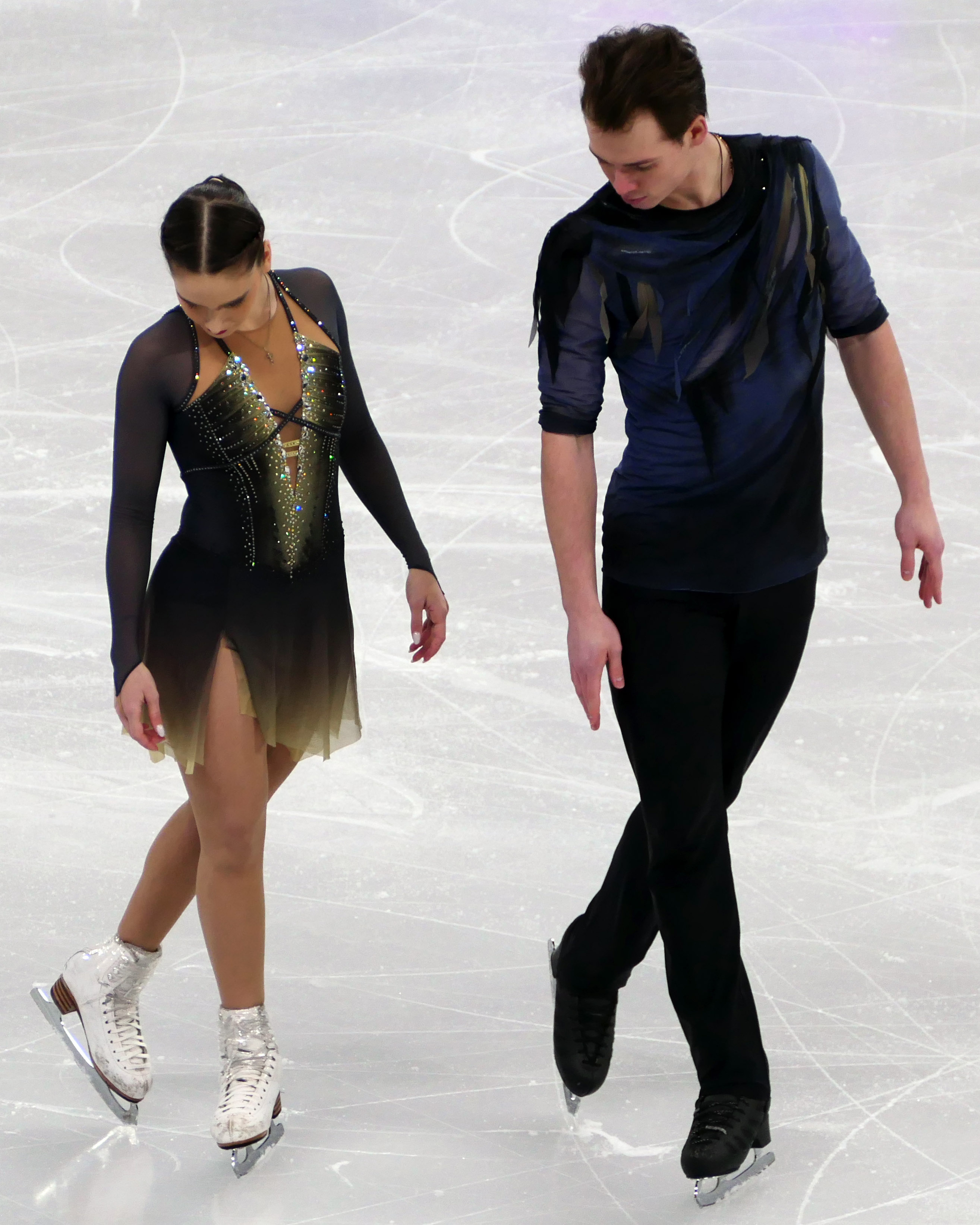
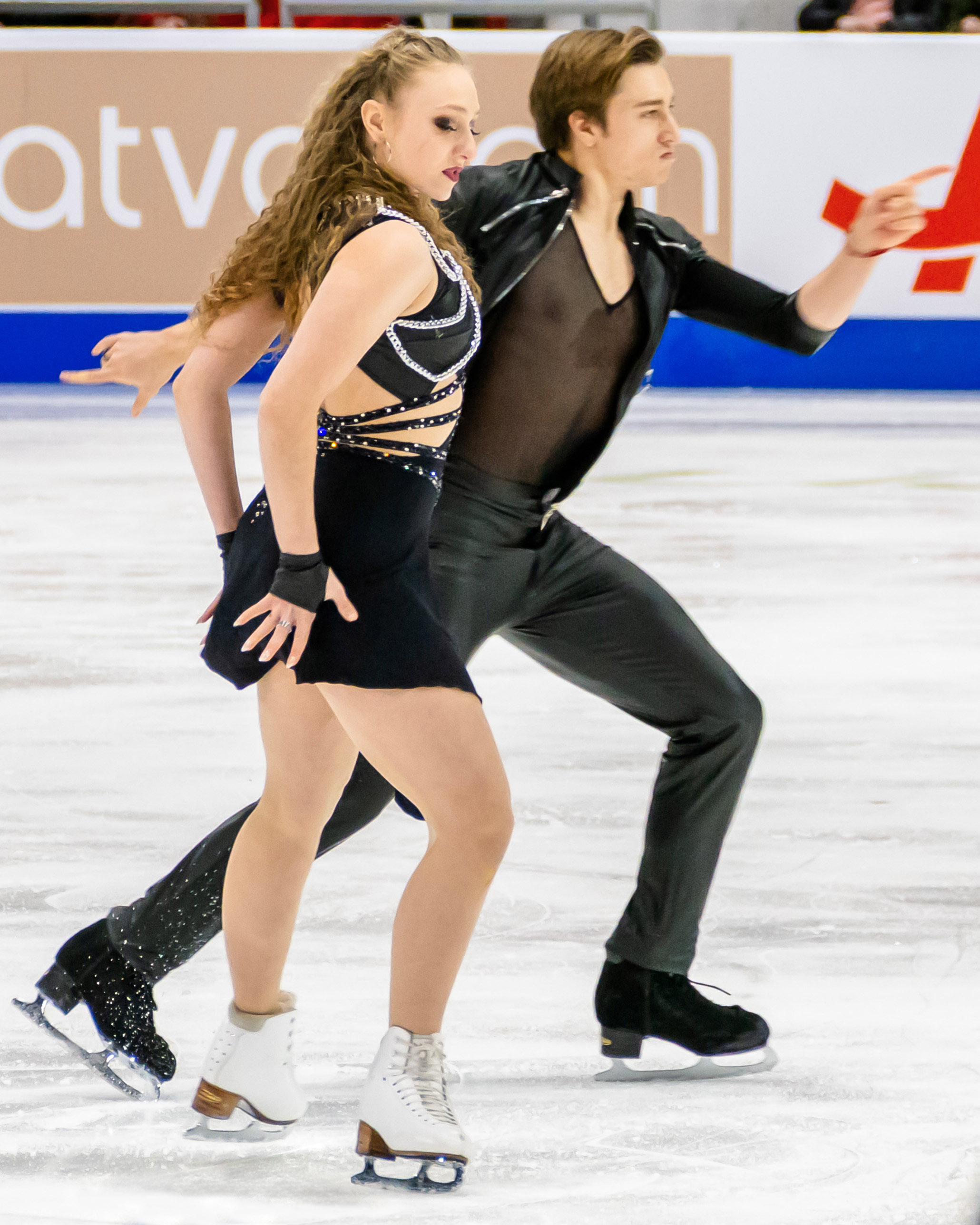
The reigning Four Nationals champions (from left to right): Adam Hagara of Slovakia (men's singles); Ekaterina Kurakova of Poland (women's singles); Maria Pavlova and Alexei Sviatchenko of Hungary (pair skating); and Kateřina Mrázková and Daniel Mrázek of the Czech Republic (ice dance)

From 2007 to 2008, skaters from the Czech Republic and Slovakia competed at the Czech and Slovak Figure Skating Championships. From 2009 to 2013, skaters from the Czech Republic, Poland, and Slovakia competed at the Three National Figure Skating Championships. Since 2014, skaters from the Czech Republic, Hungary, Poland, and Slovakia have competed at the Four Nationals Figure Skating Championships. These tables reflect all of these competitions.

=== Men's singles ===
Senior men's event medalists
Year	Location	Gold	Silver	Bronze	Ref.
2007	(Czech Republic) Liberec	(Czech Republic) Tomáš Verner	(Slovakia) Igor Macypura	(Czech Republic) Pavel Kaška	
2008	(Slovakia) Trenčín	(Czech Republic) Tomáš Verner	(Slovakia) Igor Macypura	(Czech Republic) Michal Březina	
2009	(Czech Republic) Třinec	(Czech Republic) Pavel Kaška	(Czech Republic) Michal Matloch	(Poland) Przemysław Domański	
2010	(Poland) Cieszyn	(Czech Republic) Michal Březina	(Czech Republic) Tomáš Verner	(Poland) Maciej Cieplucha	
2011	(Slovakia) Žilina	(Czech Republic) Tomáš Verner	(Czech Republic) Michal Březina	(Czech Republic) Pavel Kaška	
2012	(Czech Republic) Ostrava	(Czech Republic) Tomáš Verner	(Czech Republic) Michal Březina	(Poland) Maciej Cieplucha	
2013	(Poland) Cieszyn	(Czech Republic) Tomáš Verner	(Czech Republic) Pavel Kaška	(Poland) Patrick Myzyk	
2014	(Slovakia) Bratislava	(Czech Republic) Tomáš Verner	(Czech Republic) Michal Březina	(Poland) Maciej Cieplucha	
2015	(Hungary) Budapest	(Czech Republic) Michal Březina	(Czech Republic) Petr Coufal	(Czech Republic) Pavel Kaška	
2016	(Czech Republic) Třinec	(Czech Republic) Michal Březina	(Poland) Igor Reznichenko	(Czech Republic) Jiří Bělohradský	
2017	(Poland) Katowice	(Czech Republic) Jiří Bělohradský	(Poland) Krzysztof Gała	(Poland) Igor Reznichenko	
2018	(Slovakia) Košice	(Poland) Igor Reznichenko	(Czech Republic) Jiří Bělohradský	(Czech Republic) Matyáš Bělohradský	
2019	(Hungary) Budapest	(Czech Republic) Matyáš Bělohradský	(Czech Republic) Petr Kotlařík	(Poland) Igor Reznichenko	
2020	(Czech Republic) Ostrava	(Czech Republic) Michal Březina	(Czech Republic) Matyáš Bělohradský	(Czech Republic) Jiří Bělohradský	
2021	(Poland) Cieszyn	(Czech Republic) Jiří Bělohradský	(Poland) Kornel Witkowski	(Poland) Łukasz Kedzierski	
2022	(Slovakia) Spišská Nová Ves	(Czech Republic) Matyáš Bělohradský	(Czech Republic) Georgii Reshtenko	(Poland) Vladimir Samoilov	
2023	(Hungary) Budapest	(Poland) Vladimir Samoilov	(Slovakia) Adam Hagara	(Poland) Miłosz Witkowski	
2024	(Czech Republic) Turnov	(Slovakia) Adam Hagara	(Czech Republic) Georgii Reshtenko	(Poland) Vladimir Samoilov	
2025	(Poland) Cieszyn	(Slovakia) Adam Hagara	(Czech Republic) Georgii Reshtenko	(Poland) Vladimir Samoilov	
2026	(Slovakia) Prešov	(Slovakia) Adam Hagara	(Poland) Vladimir Samoilov	(Czech Republic) Georgii Reshtenko	

=== Women's singles ===
Senior women's event medalists
Year	Location	Gold	Silver	Bronze	Ref.
2007	(Czech Republic) Liberec	(Slovakia) Ivana Reitmayerová	(Czech Republic) Nella Simaová	(Czech Republic) Klara Novaková	
2008	(Slovakia) Trenčín	(Czech Republic) Nella Simaová	(Slovakia) Jacqueline Belenyesiová	(Czech Republic) Hana Charyparová	
2009	(Czech Republic) Třinec	(Slovakia) Ivana Reitmayerová	(Czech Republic) Nella Simaová	(Slovakia) Alexandra Kunová	
2010	(Poland) Cieszyn	(Slovakia) Ivana Reitmayerová	(Czech Republic) Martina Boček	(Czech Republic) Ivana Buzková	
2011	(Slovakia) Žilina	(Poland) Anna Jurkiewicz	(Slovakia) Alexandra Kunová	(Czech Republic) Martina Boček	
2012	(Czech Republic) Ostrava	(Slovakia) Monika Simančíková	(Slovakia) Nicole Rajičová	(Poland) Alexandra Kamieniecki	
2013	(Poland) Cieszyn	(Poland) Agata Kryger	(Slovakia) Nicole Rajičová	(Czech Republic) Laura Raszyková	
2014	(Slovakia) Bratislava	(Czech Republic) Eliška Březinová	(Czech Republic) Elizaveta Ukolova	(Poland) Agata Kryger	
2015	(Hungary) Budapest	(Slovakia) Nicole Rajičová	(Hungary) Ivett Tóth	(Czech Republic) Eliška Březinová	
2016	(Czech Republic) Třinec	(Slovakia) Nicole Rajičová	(Hungary) Ivett Tóth	(Hungary) Fruzsina Medgyesi	
2017	(Poland) Katowice	(Hungary) Ivett Tóth	(Slovakia) Nicole Rajičová	(Czech Republic) Michaela Lucie Hanzlíková	
2018	(Slovakia) Košice	(Czech Republic) Eliška Březinová	(Hungary) Fruzsina Medgyesi	(Hungary) Ivett Tóth	
2019	(Hungary) Budapest	(Poland) Ekaterina Kurakova	(Czech Republic) Eliška Březinová	(Hungary) Ivett Tóth	
2020	(Czech Republic) Ostrava	(Poland) Ekaterina Kurakova	(Hungary) Ivett Tóth	(Hungary) Regina Schermann	
2021	(Poland) Cieszyn	(Poland) Ekaterina Kurakova	(Czech Republic) Eliška Březinová	(Czech Republic) Nikola Rychtaříková	
2022	(Slovakia) Spišská Nová Ves	(Poland) Ekaterina Kurakova	(Czech Republic) Eliška Březinová	(Hungary) Júlia Láng	
2023	(Hungary) Budapest	(Poland) Ekaterina Kurakova	(Czech Republic) Barbora Vránková	(Hungary) Júlia Láng	
2024	(Czech Republic) Turnov	(Poland) Ekaterina Kurakova	(Slovakia) Vanesa Šelmeková	(Czech Republic) Barbora Vránková	
2025	(Poland) Cieszyn	(Slovakia) Vanesa Šelmeková	(Slovakia) Ema Doboszová	(Poland) Ekaterina Kurakova	
2026	(Slovakia) Prešov	(Poland) Ekaterina Kurakova	(Czech Republic) Barbora Vránková	(Czech Republic) Michaela Vraštáková	

=== Pairs ===
Senior pairs' event medalists
Year	Location	Gold	Silver	Bronze	Ref.
No pairs competitors prior to 2009
2009	(Czech Republic) Třinec	(United Kingdom); Stacey Kemp; David King	(Poland); Joanna Sulej; Mateusz Chruściński	(Poland); Krystyna Klimczak; Janusz Karweta	
2010	(Poland) Cieszyn	(United Kingdom); Stacey Kemp; David King	(Poland); Joanna Sulej; Mateusz Chruściński	(Estonia); Maria Sergejeva; Ilja Glebov	
2011	(Slovakia) Žilina	(Czech Republic); Klára Kadlecová; Petr Bidař	(Poland); Magdalena Klatka; Radosław Chruściński	(Czech Republic); Alexandra Herbríková; Alexandr Zaboev	
2012	(Czech Republic) Ostrava	(Poland); Magdalena Klatka; Radosław Chruściński	(Poland); Aleksandra Malinkiewicz; Sebastian Lofek	(Czech Republic); Alexandra Herbríková; Rudy Halmaert	
2013	(Poland) Cieszyn	(Poland); Marcelina Lech; Jakub Tyc	(Poland); Marya Kozina; Janusz Karweta	No other competitors	
2014	(Slovakia) Bratislava	(Poland); Magdalena Klatka; Radosław Chruściński	No other competitors		
2015	(Hungary) Budapest	No pairs competitors			
2016	(Czech Republic) Třinec	(Hungary); Anna Marie Pearce; Márk Magyar	No other competitors		
2017–19	No pairs competitors				
2020	(Czech Republic) Ostrava	(Hungary); Ioulia Chtchetinina; Márk Magyar	No other competitors		
2021	(Poland) Cieszyn	(Czech Republic); Jelizaveta Žuková; Martin Bidař	No other competitors		
2022	(Slovakia) Spišská Nová Ves	(Hungary); Ioulia Chtchetinina; Márk Magyar	(Hungary); Maria Pavlova; Balázs Nagy	(Poland); Anna Hernik; Michał Woźniak	
2023	(Hungary) Budapest	(Hungary); Maria Pavlova; Alexei Sviatchenko	(Czech Republic); Federica Simioli; Alessandro Zarbo	No other competitors	
2024	(Czech Republic) Turnov	(Hungary); Maria Pavlova; Alexei Sviatchenko	(Poland); Ioulia Chtchetinina; Michał Woźniak	(Czech Republic); Barbora Kucianová; Martin Bidař	
2025	(Poland) Cieszyn	(Poland); Ioulia Chtchetinina; Michał Woźniak	No other competitors		
2026	(Slovakia) Prešov	(Hungary); Maria Pavlova; Alexei Sviatchenko	(Czech Republic); Anna Valesi; Martin Bidař	(Poland); Ioulia Chtchetinina; Michał Woźniak	

=== Ice dance ===
Senior ice dance event medalists
Year	Location	Gold	Silver	Bronze	Ref.
2007	(Czech Republic) Liberec	(Czech Republic); Kamila Hájková; David Vincour	No other competitors		
2008	(Slovakia) Trenčín	(Czech Republic); Kamila Hájková; David Vincour	(Czech Republic); Lucie Myslivečková; Matěj Novák	No other competitors	
2009	(Czech Republic) Třinec	(Czech Republic); Kamila Hájková; David Vincour	(Czech Republic); Lucie Myslivečková; Matěj Novák	(Poland); Joanna Budner; Jan Mościcki	
2010	(Poland) Cieszyn	(Czech Republic); Kamila Hájková; David Vincour	(Poland); Anastasia Vykhodtseva; Jan Mościcki	(Slovakia); Nikola Višňová; Lukáš Csölley	
2011	(Slovakia) Žilina	(Czech Republic); Lucie Myslivečková; Matěj Novák	(Slovakia); Nikola Višňová; Lukáš Csölley	(Poland); Alexandra Zvorygina; Maciej Bernadowski	
2012	(Czech Republic) Ostrava	(Poland); Alexandra Zvorygina; Maciej Bernadowski	(Czech Republic); Gabriela Kubová; Dmitri Kiselev	(Czech Republic); Lucie Myslivečková; Neil Brown	
2013	(Poland) Cieszyn	(Czech Republic); Lucie Myslivečková; Neil Brown	(Poland); Alexandra Zvorygina; Maciej Bernadowski	(Poland); Justyna Plutowska; Peter Gerber	
2014	(Slovakia) Bratislava	(Slovakia); Federica Testa; Lukáš Csölley	(Hungary); Dóra Turóczi; Balázs Major	(Poland); Justyna Plutowska; Peter Gerber	
2015	(Hungary) Budapest	(Slovakia); Federica Testa; Lukáš Csölley	(Poland); Natalia Kaliszek; Maksym Spodyriev	(Czech Republic); Cortney Mansour; Michal Češka	
2016	(Czech Republic) Třinec	(Slovakia); Federica Testa; Lukáš Csölley	(Poland); Natalia Kaliszek; Maksym Spodyriev	No other competitors	
2017	(Poland) Katowice	(Poland); Natalia Kaliszek; Maksym Spodyriev	(Slovakia); Lucie Myslivečková; Lukáš Csölley	(Czech Republic); Cortney Mansour; Michal Češka	
2018	(Slovakia) Košice	(Poland); Natalia Kaliszek; Maksym Spodyriev	(Hungary); Anna Yanovskaya; Ádám Lukács	(Poland); Justyna Plutowska; Jérémie Flemin	
2019	(Hungary) Budapest	(Poland); Natalia Kaliszek; Maksym Spodyriev	(Hungary); Anna Yanovskaya; Ádám Lukács	(Poland); Justyna Plutowska; Jérémie Flemin	
2020	(Czech Republic) Ostrava	(Poland); Natalia Kaliszek; Maksym Spodyriev	(Poland); Justyna Plutowska; Jérémie Flemin	(Poland); Anastasia Polibina; Pavel Golovishnikov	
2021	(Poland) Cieszyn	(Poland); Natalia Kaliszek; Maksym Spodyriev	(Poland); Anastasia Polibina; Pavel Golovishnikov	No other competitors	
2022	(Slovakia) Spišská Nová Ves	(Poland); Natalia Kaliszek; Maksym Spodyriev	(Czech Republic); Natálie Taschlerová; Filip Taschler	(Hungary); Mariia Ignateva; Danijil Szemko	
2023	(Hungary) Budapest	(Czech Republic); Natálie Taschlerová; Filip Taschler	(Hungary); Mariia Ignateva; Danijil Szemko	(Poland); Anastasia Polibina; Pavel Golovishnikov	
2024	(Czech Republic) Turnov	(Czech Republic); Kateřina Mrázková; Daniel Mrázek	(Slovakia); Mária Sofia Pucherová; Nikita Lysak	(Slovakia); Anna Simová; Kirill Aksenov	
2025	(Poland) Cieszyn	(Czech Republic); Natálie Taschlerová; Filip Taschler	(Czech Republic); Kateřina Mrázková; Daniel Mrázek	(Slovakia); Mária Sofia Pucherová; Nikita Lysak	
2026	(Slovakia) Prešov	(Czech Republic); Kateřina Mrázková; Daniel Mrázek	(Czech Republic); Natálie Taschlerová; Filip Taschler	(Hungary); Mariia Ignateva; Danijil Szemko	

== Junior medalists ==
=== Pairs ===
Junior pairs' event medalists
Year	Location	Gold	Silver	Bronze	Ref.
2007	(Czech Republic) Liberec	(Slovakia); Kristina Kabatová; Martin Hanulák	No other competitors		
2008	(Slovakia) Trenčín	No junior pairs competitors			
2009	(Czech Republic) Třinec	(Czech Republic); Alexandra Herbríková; Lukáš Ovčáček	(Poland); Natalia Kaliszek; Michał Kaliszek	(Poland); Małgorzata Lipińska; Bartosz Paluchowski	
2010–11	No junior pairs competitors				
2012	(Czech Republic) Ostrava	(Czech Republic); Anna Dušková; Martin Bidař	(Czech Republic); Natálie Kratěnová; Petr Kotlařík	No other competitors	
2013	(Poland) Cieszyn	No junior pairs competitors			
2014	(Slovakia) Bratislava	(Czech Republic); Anna Dušková; Martin Bidař	No other competitors		
2015	(Hungary) Budapest	(Czech Republic); Anna Dušková; Martin Bidař	No other competitors		
2016–18	No junior pairs competitors				
2019	(Hungary) Budapest	(Slovakia); Tereza Zendulková; Simon Fukas	No other competitors		
2020	(Czech Republic) Ostrava	(Czech Republic); Lucie Novotná; Mykyta Husakov	No other competitors		
2021	(Poland) Cieszyn	(Czech Republic); Barbora Kucianová; Lukáš Vochozka	(Slovakia); Margaréta Mušková; Oliver Kubačák	No other competitors	
2022	(Slovakia) Spišská Nová Ves	(Czech Republic); Barbora Kucianová; Lukáš Vochozka	(Slovakia); Margaréta Mušková; Oliver Kubačák	No other competitors	
2023	(Hungary) Budapest	(Czech Republic); Barbora Kucianová; Lukáš Vochozka	(Slovakia); Nikola Sitková; Oliver Kubačák	No other competitors	
2024	(Czech Republic) Turnov	(Czech Republic); Debora Anna Cohen; Lukáš Vochozka	(Slovakia); Nikola Sitková; Oliver Kubačák	No other competitors	
2025	(Poland) Cieszyn	(Slovakia); Laura Hečkova; Alex Války	(Czech Republic); Johanka Žilková; Matyáš Becerra	(Czech Republic); Alzbeta Kviderova; Jindrich Klement	
2026	(Slovakia) Prešov	(Hungary); Lily Wilberforce; Mózes József Berei	(Czech Republic); Johanka Žilková; Matyáš Becerra	(Czech Republic); Debora Anna Cohen; Lukáš Vochozka	

=== Ice dance ===
Junior ice dance event medalists
Year	Location	Gold	Silver	Bronze	Ref.
2007	(Czech Republic) Liberec	(Czech Republic); Lucie Myslivečková; Matěj Novák	(Slovakia); Nikola Višňová; Lukáš Csölley	No other competitors	
2008	(Slovakia) Trenčín	(Slovakia); Nikola Višňová; Lukáš Csölley	No other competitors		
2009	(Czech Republic) Třinec	(Czech Republic); Karolína Procházková; Michal Češka	(Czech Republic); Gabriela Kubová; Petr Seknička	No other competitors	
2010	(Poland) Cieszyn	(Czech Republic); Gabriela Kubová; Dmitri Kiselev	No other competitors		
2011	(Slovakia) Žilina	(Czech Republic); Karolína Procházková; Michal Češka	(Czech Republic); Gabriela Kubová; Dmitri Kiselev	(Slovakia); Nikola Višňová; Lukáš Csölley	
2012	(Czech Republic) Ostrava	(Poland); Natalia Kaliszek; Michał Kaliszek	(Czech Republic); Jana Čejková; Alexandr Sinicyn	(Czech Republic); Kateřina Koníčková; Matěj Lang	
2013	(Poland) Cieszyn	(Czech Republic); Karolína Procházková; Michal Češka	(Czech Republic); Jana Čejková; Alexandr Sinicyn	(Czech Republic); Kateřina Koníčková; Matěj Lang	
2014	(Slovakia) Bratislava	(Hungary); Carolina Moscheni; Ádám Lukács	(Czech Republic); Cortney Mansour; Michal Češka	(Czech Republic); Kateřina Koníčková; Matěj Lang	
2015	(Hungary) Budapest	(Hungary); Carolina Moscheni; Ádám Lukács	(Czech Republic); Nicole Kuzmichová; Alexandr Sinicyn	(Czech Republic); Kateřina Koníčková; Matěj Lang	
2016	(Czech Republic) Třinec	(Czech Republic); Nicole Kuzmichová; Alexandr Sinicyn	(Poland); Olexandra Borysova; Cezary Zawadzki	(Hungary); Kimberly Wei; Iliász Fourati	
2017	(Poland) Katowice	(Poland); Anastasia Polibina; Radosław Barszczak	(Poland); Olexandra Borysova; Cezary Zawadzki	(Hungary); Hanna Jakucs; Dániel Illés	
2018	(Slovakia) Košice	(Hungary); Villő Marton; Danijil Szemko	(Czech Republic); Natálie Taschlerová; Filip Taschler	(Poland); Olexandra Borysova; Cezary Zawadzki	
2019	(Hungary) Budapest	(Czech Republic); Natálie Taschlerová; Filip Taschler	(Hungary); Villő Marton; Danijil Szemko	(Hungary); Adelina Zvezdova; Alfréd Söregi-Niksz	
2020	(Czech Republic) Ostrava	(Czech Republic); Natálie Taschlerová; Filip Taschler	(Hungary); Villő Marton; Danijil Szemko	(Czech Republic); Denisa Cimlová; Vilém Hlavsa	
2021	(Poland) Cieszyn	(Czech Republic); Denisa Cimlová; Vilém Hlavsa	(Poland); Arina Klimova; Filip Bojanowski	(Poland); Sofiia Dovhal; Wiktor Kulesza	
2022	(Slovakia) Spišská Nová Ves	(Czech Republic); Denisa Cimlová; Vilém Hlavsa	(Czech Republic); Kateřina Mrázková; Daniel Mrázek	(Slovakia); Anna Simová; Kiril Aksenov	
2023	(Hungary) Budapest	(Czech Republic); Kateřina Mrázková; Daniel Mrázek	(Poland); Sofiia Dovhal; Wiktor Kulesza	(Czech Republic); Natalie Blaasová; Filip Blaas	
2024	(Czech Republic) Turnov	(Czech Republic); Eliška Žáková; Filip Mencl	(Czech Republic); Natalie Blaasová; Filip Blaas	(Czech Republic); Lauren Audrey Batkova; Jacob Yang	
2025	(Poland) Cieszyn	(Slovakia); Aneta Václavíková; Ivan Morozov	(Czech Republic); Eliška Žáková; Filip Mencl	(Slovakia); Lucia Štefanovová; Jacopo Boeris	
2026	(Slovakia) Prešov	(Czech Republic); Diane Sznajder; Jáchym Novák	(Slovakia); Lucia Štefanovová; Jacopo Boeris	(Czech Republic); Eliška Žáková; Filip Mencl	

== Records ==
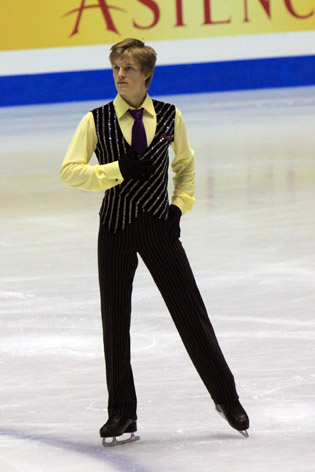
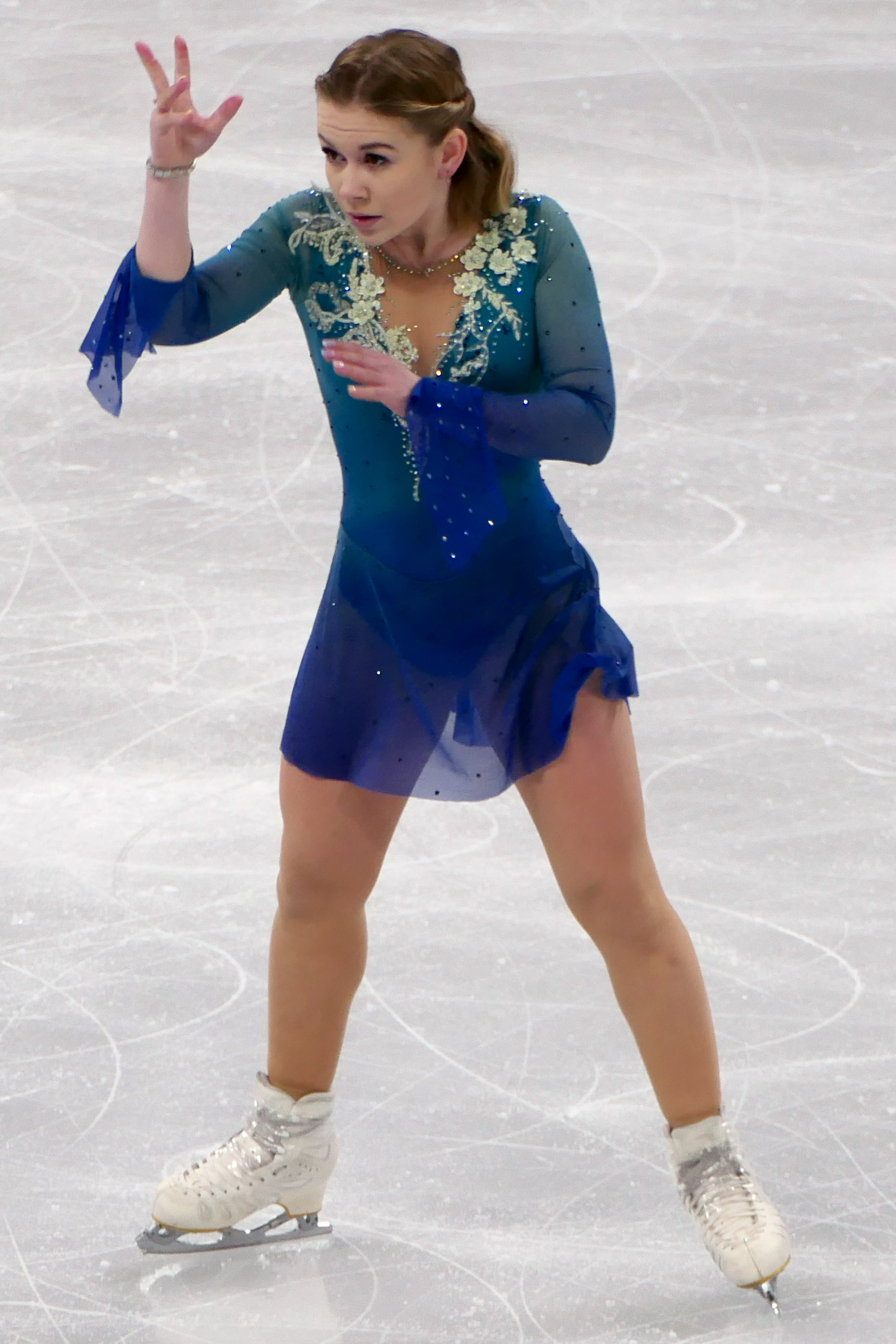
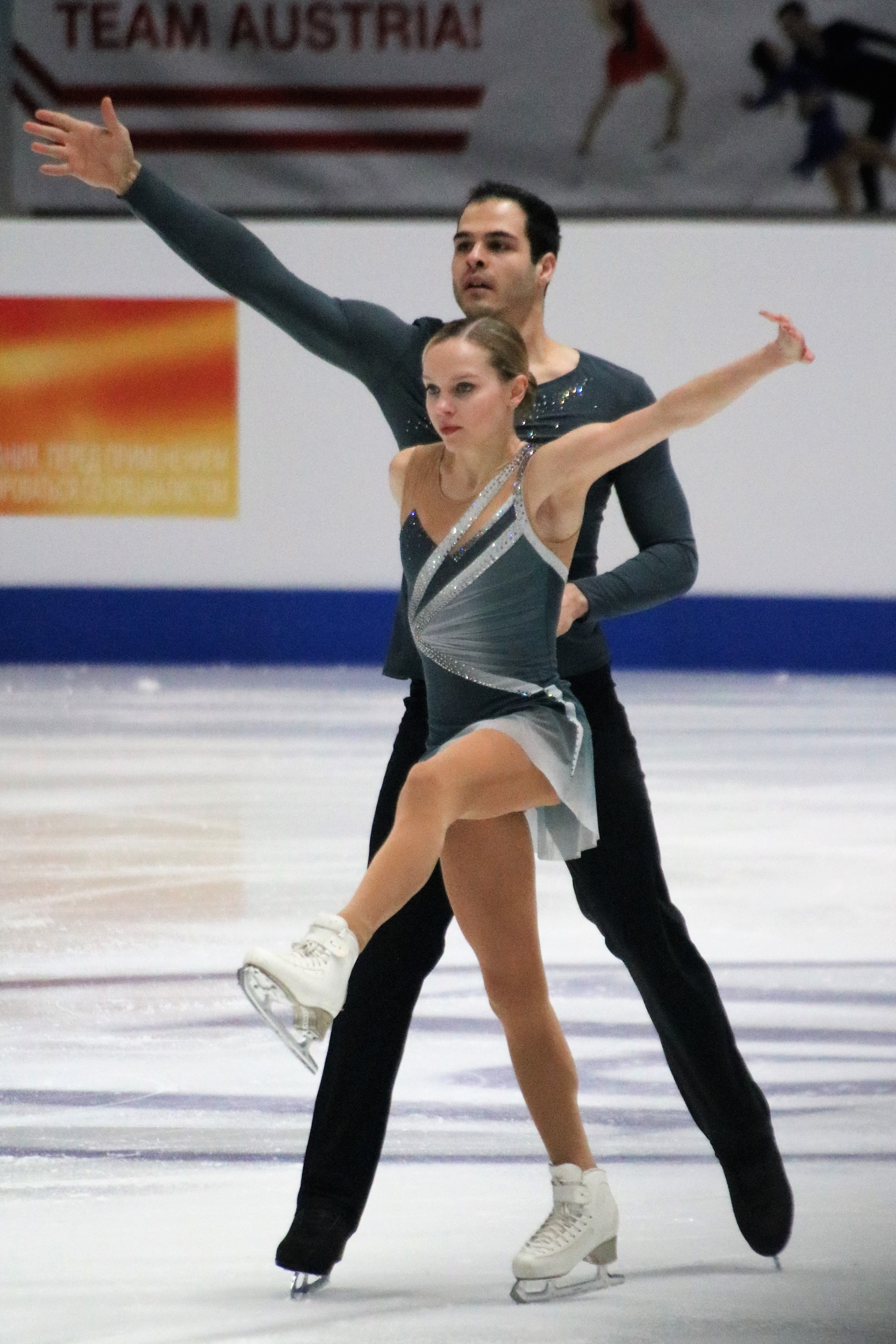
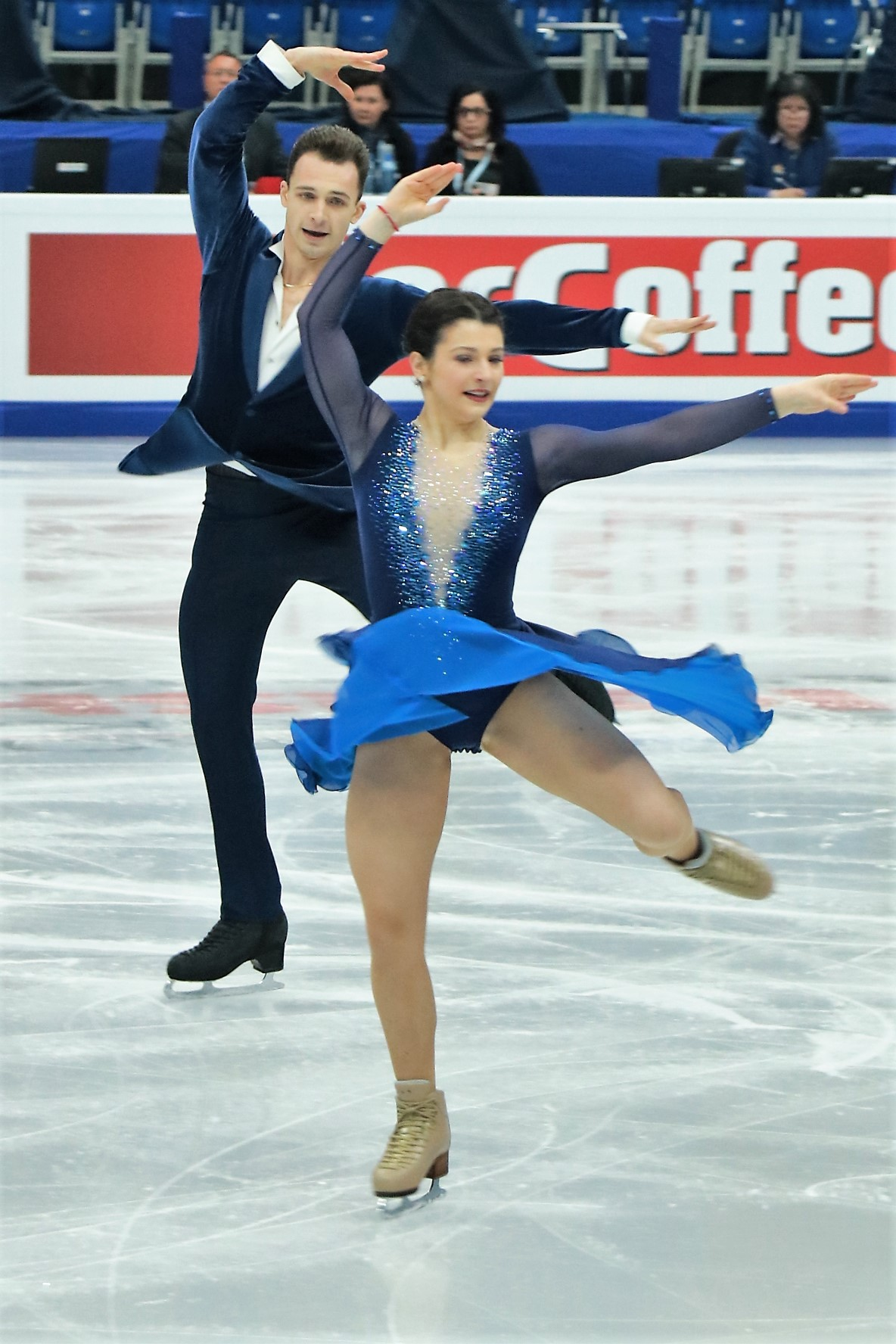
From left to right: Tomáš Verner of the Czech Republic has won six Four Nationals Championship titles in men's singles; Ekaterina Kurakova of Poland has won seven Four Nationals Championship titles in women's singles; Ioulia Chtchetinina of Poland and Márk Magyar of Hungary have each won three Four Nationals Championship titles in pair skating, twice while partnered together; and Natalia Kaliszek and Maksym Spodyriev of Poland have won six Four Nationals Championship titles in ice dance.

Records
Discipline	Most championship titles			
Discipline	Skater(s)	No.	Years	Ref.
Men's singles	(Czech Republic); Tomáš Verner	6	2007–08; 2011–14	
Women's singles	(Poland); Ekaterina Kurakova	7	2019–24; 2026	
Pairs	(Hungary); (Poland); Ioulia Chtchetinina; (Note: Ioulia Chtchetinina won two championship titles while partnered with Márk Magyar and competing for Hungary (2020, 2022), and one with Michał Woźniak and competing for Poland (2025).)	3	2020; 2022; 2025	
Pairs	(Hungary); Márk Magyar; (Note: Márk Magyar won one championship title while partnered with Anna Marie Pearce (2016), and two with Ioulia Chtchetinina (2020, 2022).)	3	2016; 2020; 2022	
Pairs	(Hungary); Maria Pavlova; Alexei Sviatchenko	3	2023–24; 2026	
Ice dance	(Poland); Natalia Kaliszek; Maksym Spodyriev	6	2017–22	

== Cumulative medal count (senior medalists) ==
=== Men's singles ===
Total number of Four Nationals medals in men's singles by nation
Rank	Nation	Gold	Silver	Bronze	Total
1	Czech Republic	15	13	8	36
2	Slovakia	3	3	0	6
3	Poland	2	4	12	18
Totals (3 entries)		20	20	20	60

=== Women's singles ===
Total number of Four Nationals medals in women's singles by nation
Rank	Nation	Gold	Silver	Bronze	Total
1	Poland	9	0	3	12
2	Slovakia	7	7	1	15
3	Czech Republic	3	9	10	22
4	Hungary	1	4	6	11
Totals (4 entries)		20	20	20	60

=== Pairs ===
Total number of Four Nationals medals in pairs by nation
Rank	Nation	Gold	Silver	Bronze	Total
1	Hungary	6	1	0	7
2	Poland	4	6	3	13
3	Czech Republic	2	2	3	7
4	Great Britain	2	0	0	2
5	Estonia	0	0	1	1
Totals (5 entries)		14	9	7	30

=== Ice dance ===
Total number of Four Nationals medals in ice dance by nation
Rank	Nation	Gold	Silver	Bronze	Total
1	Czech Republic	10	6	3	19
2	Poland	7	6	8	21
3	Slovakia	3	3	3	9
4	Hungary	0	4	2	6
Totals (4 entries)		20	19	16	55

=== Total medals ===
Total number of Four Nationals medals by nation
Rank	Nation	Gold	Silver	Bronze	Total
1	Czech Republic	30	30	24	84
2	Poland	22	16	26	64
3	Slovakia	13	13	4	30
4	Hungary	7	9	8	24
5	Great Britain	2	0	0	2
6	Estonia	0	0	1	1
Totals (6 entries)		74	68	63	205

== See also ==
- Czech Figure Skating Championships
- Hungarian Figure Skating Championships
- Polish Figure Skating Championships
- Slovak Figure Skating Championships
