= Chruściński =

Chruściński (feminine: Chruścińska; plural: Chruścińscy) is a Polish surname. Notable people with this surname include:

- Mateusz Chruściński (born 1987), Polish figure skater
- Radosław Chruściński (born 1991), Polish figure skater
