= Nikola Višňová =

Czech ice dancer (born 1992)

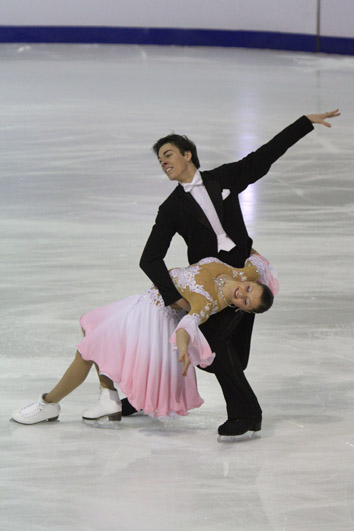

Personal information
- Born: 25 May 1992 (age 34) Brno, Czechoslovakia
- Height: 1.69 m (5 ft 7 in)

Figure skating career
- Country: Slovakia
- Coach: Roberto Pelizzola; Raffaella Cazzaniga; N. Lunghi
- Skating club: SKP Bratislava

Medal record
Slovak Championships
Gold medal – first place	2009 Třinec	Ice dance
Gold medal – first place	2010 Cieszyn	Ice dance
Gold medal – first place	2011 Žilina	Ice dance

Nikola Višňová (born 25 May 1992 in Brno) is a Czech ice dancer who competed for Slovakia with Lukáš Csölley from 2006 to 2011. They are three-time (2009–2011) Slovak national champions and reached the free dance at five World Junior Championships. Their best result, 5th, came at the 2011 World Junior Championships.

== Career ==
In 2006, Višňová teamed up with Slovak skater Lukáš Csölley. They decided to represent Slovakia. In their first two seasons, they trained under Gabriela Hrázská in Brno, Bratislava, and Oberstdorf. They finished 19th at the 2007 World Junior Championships in Oberstdorf and 17th at the 2008 World Junior Championships in Sofia.

In the 2008–09 season, Višňová/Csölley trained in Berlin, Oberstdorf, and Brno, coached by Hendryk Schamberger. They placed 17th at the 2009 World Junior Championships in Sofia.

During the next two seasons, the two were coached by Roberto Pelizzola and Raffaella Cazzaniga in Milan. They ranked 20th at the 2010 European Championships in Tallinn, Estonia; 19th at the 2010 World Junior Championships in The Hague, Netherlands; 22nd at the 2011 European Championships in Bern, Switzerland; and 5th at the 2011 World Junior Championships in Gangneung, South Korea. In September 2011, it was reported that their partnership had ended.

== Programs ==
(with Csolley)

Season	Short dance	Free dance
2010–11	Once Upon A December performed by Deana Carter; Tango Concertante by Ralf Gscheidle	Notre-Dame de Paris by Riccardo Cocciante; Les temps des cathedrales; Belle; Les sans-papiers; Danse Mon Esmeralda
	Original dance	
2009–10	Flamenco	Prelude (On Earth As In Heaven); Wyatt's Torch; Take Me Away by Globus
2008–09	Charleston: Aviator; The Mooch; Charleston: Aviator	Billie Jean; I Just Can't Stop Loving You; Scream by Michael Jackson
2007–08	Na Vsetine; Gorale by Čechomor	Volare; A Mi Manera; Volare Radio Mix by Gipsy Kings
2006–07	Cell Block Tango from Chicago (musical) by John Kander, Fred Ebb; Tango by Jesse Cook; Cell Block Tango from Chicago (musical) by John Kander, Fred Ebb	Volare; A Mi Manera; Volare Radio Mix by Gipsy Kings

== Competitive highlights ==
JGP: Junior Grand Prix

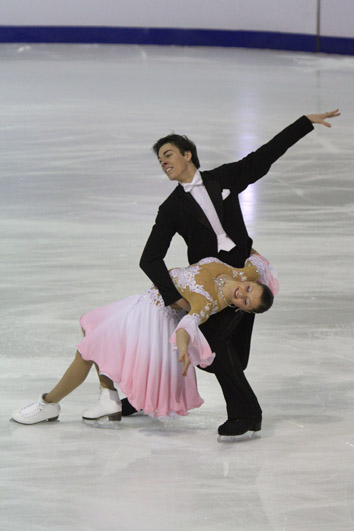
Višňová/Csölley at the 2010 World Junior Championships

International
Event	06–07	07–08	08–09	09–10	10–11
European Champ.				20th	22nd
Golden Spin					9th
Nepela Memorial			6th		
Pavel Roman					2nd
International: Junior
World Junior Champ.	19th	17th	17th	19th	5th
JGP Austria		13th			10th
JGP Czech Republic	14th				7th
JGP France			15th		
JGP Germany		8th		14th	
JGP Hungary	13th				
JGP Turkey				8th	
JGP United Kingdom			11th		
Grand Prize SNP		4th J			
Mont Blanc Trophy					3rd J
Pavel Roman			4th J		
National
Slovak Champ.	1st J	1st J	1st	1st	1st
J = Junior level
