= Alexei Sviatchenko =

Russian-Hungarian pair skater (born 1999)

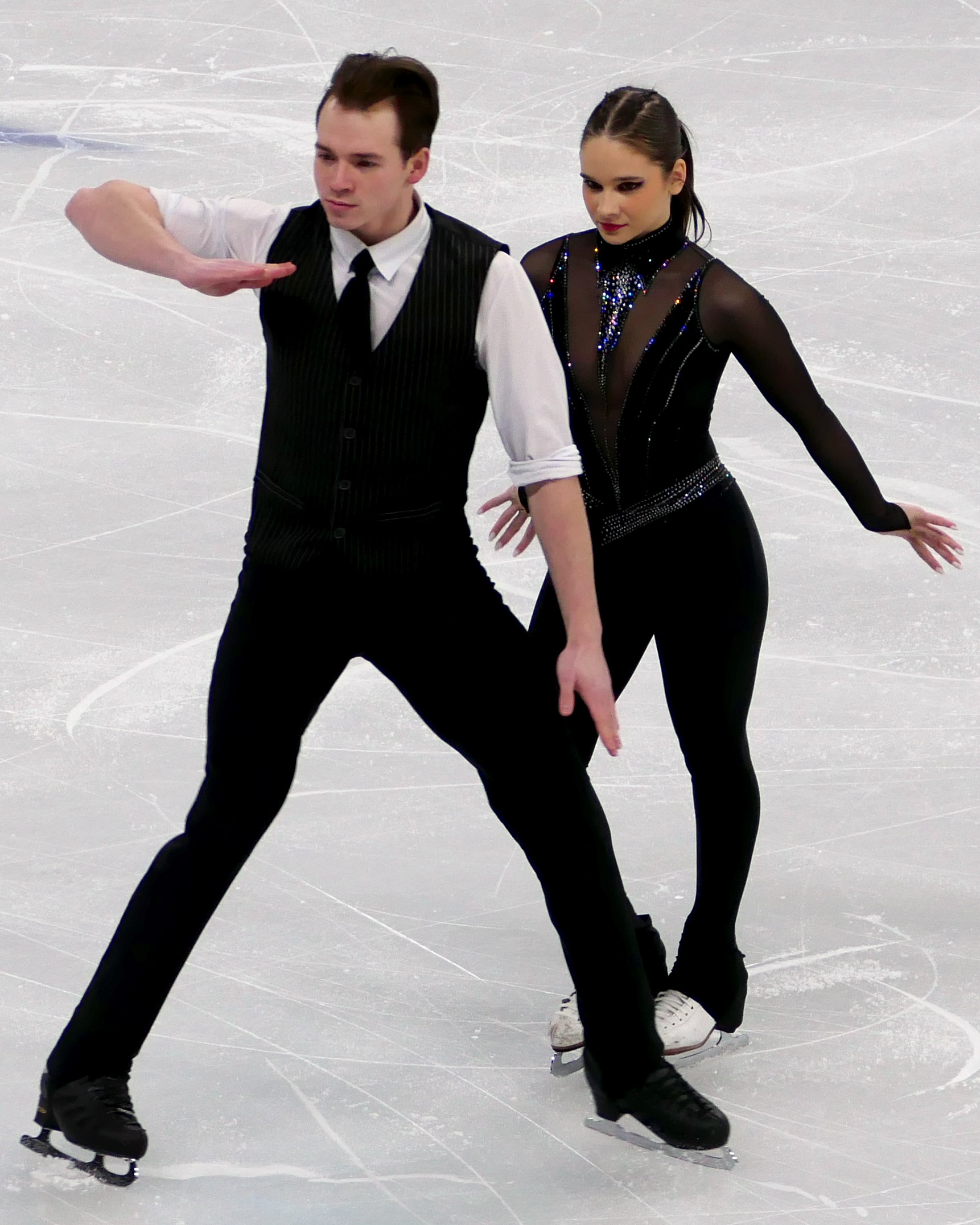
- Maria Pavlova and Alexei Sviatchenko at the 2024 World Championships

Personal information
- Native name: Алексей Вадимович Святченко (Russian)
- Full name: Alexei Vadimovich Sviatchenko
- Other names: Aleksei
- Born: 24 March 1999 (age 27) St. Petersburg, Russia
- Height: 1.82 m (6 ft 0 in)

Figure skating career
- Country: Hungary (since 2022); Russia (2016–22)
- Discipline: Pair skating
- Partner: Maria Pavlova (since 2022); Nadezhda Labazina (2021–22); Anastasia Balabanova (2020–21); Daria Kvartalova (2016–19)
- Coach: Dmitri Savin; Fedor Klimov; Sofia Evdokimova; Gurgen Vardanjan
- Skating club: Sebestyén KSE
- Began skating: 2006

Medal record
Representing Hungary
European Championships
Bronze medal – third place	2026 Sheffield	Pairs
Hungarian Championships
Gold medal – first place	2023 Budapest	Pairs
Gold medal – first place	2024 Turnov	Pairs
Gold medal – first place	2026 Presov	Pairs

Alexei Vadimovich Sviatchenko (Russian: Алексей Вадимович Святченко, Hungarian: Alekszej Vadimovics Szvjatcsenko; born 24 March 1999) is a Russian and Hungarian pair skater who currently competes for Hungary. With his current skating partner, Maria Pavlova, he is the 2026 European bronze medalist, a five-time ISU Grand Prix medalist, two-time ISU Challenger Series medalist, and three-time Hungarian national champion (2023–24, 2026).

== Personal life ==
Sviatchenko was born on 24 March 1999 in St. Petersburg, Russia. Fluent Russian, he has also been learning how to speak the Hungarian language.

In March 2024, his girlfriend, former Russian ice dancer and choreographer, Sofia Evdokimova, announced that they were engaged. They married in April 2025.

== Career ==
=== Early years and career for Russia ===
Sviatchenko began learning how to skate in 2006. He became interested in the sport upon first seeing skaters at an ice rink and asked his mother to put him in lessons. He trained first as a single skater in Kolpino, a suburb of St. Petersburg, and at the age of 12 took up pair skating at the Figure Skating Club of St. Petersburg coached by Alexei Sokolov.

Sviatchenko competed with his first partner, Daria Kvartalova, until 2019. The team competed at four junior international events together, most notably finishing third at the 2018 JGP Canada. Following his split with Kvartalova, Sviatchenko had two more short-lived partnerships for Russia, one with Anastasia Balabanova during the 2020–21 season, and another with Nadezhda Labazina the following year. Labazina/Sviatchenko had one international start together before parting ways, finishing ninth at the 2021 CS Denis Ten Memorial Challenge.

=== Partnership with Maria Pavlova for Hungary ===
==== 2022–23 season: Debut of Pavlova/Sviatchenko, first national title ====
Sviatchenko had his first tryout with his current skating partner, Maria Pavlova, in March 2022 at what is now their current training base in Sochi. The duo chose to move forward as a new team for Hungary not long after, coached by Pavlova's staff consisting of Dmitri Savin, Fedor Klimov, Sofia Evdokimova, and Gurgen Vardanjan.

Pavlova/Sviatchenko made their competitive debut late in the 2022–23 season at the 2022 CS Golden Spin of Zagreb, where they finished ninth. Weeks later, the team claimed their first Hungarian national title at the 2023 Four Nationals Championship, the combined national championship event for Hungary, the Czech Republic, Slovakia, and Poland. Due to their placement at the event, Pavlova/Sviatchenko were named to the Hungarian teams for the 2023 European Championships in January, and the 2023 World Championships in March.

At the European Championships, Pavlova/Sviatchenko placed sixth in the short program and fourth in the free skate to finish fifth overall, the best placement for a Hungarian team at the event in many years. In preparation for the World Championships, the team competed at two senior B events, the 2023 Bavarian Open and the 2023 Challenge Cup, where they placed first and second respectively.

Pavlova/Sviatchenko capped their season at Worlds, hosted in Saitama, Japan. There, the duo set new personal bests in both segments of competition, placing eighth in the short program and seventh in the free skate for seventh-place finish overall, another landmark placement for a Hungarian pair team at the competition in recent memory.

==== 2023–24 season: Grand Prix medalists ====
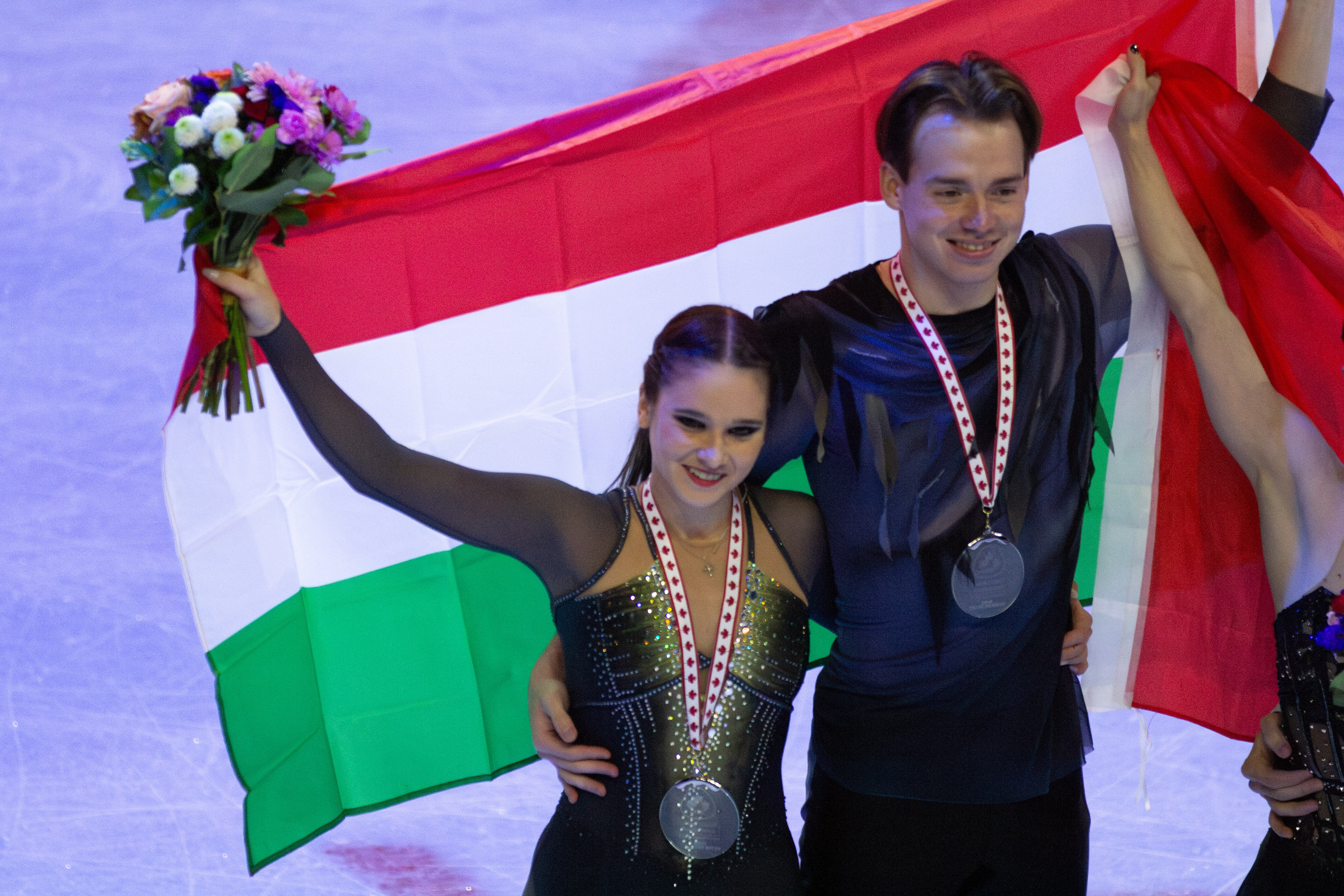
Pavlova and Sviatchenko at 2023 Skate Canada International

Pavlova/Sviatchenko opened their second season together in September at the 2023 CS Nebelhorn Trophy where they finished fifth. They followed up this placement with a third-place finish at the 2023 CS Finlandia Trophy, and a silver medal in the Challenger ineligible pairs event at the 2023 CS Budapest Trophy.

The team made their ISU Grand Prix series debut in late October at the 2023 Skate Canada International, held in Vancouver. Pavlova/Sviatchenko placed fourth in the short program, and rose to second in the free skate to finish second overall between Canadian gold medalists Stellato-Dudek/Deschamps and Italian third-place finishers Beccari/Guarise. Their placement marked the first medal for Hungary in pairs at a Grand Prix event. Following the free skate, Pavlova remarked, "We're really happy with our performance and we're going to improve every time and we have a lot of things to work on. Our federation is happy for us. We're giving good results for our country and we will continue to do that."

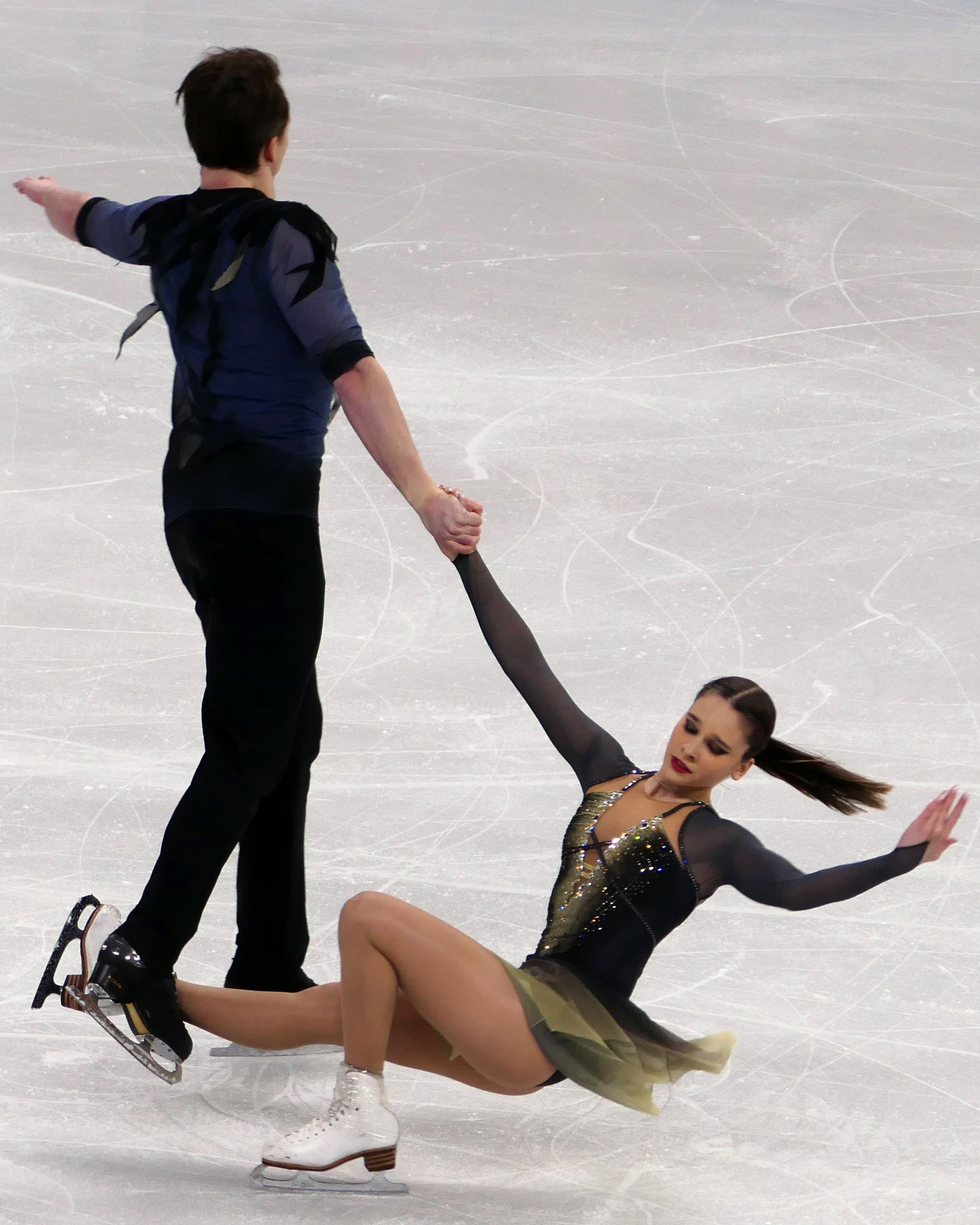
Pavlova and Sviatchenko perform a pair spin during their free skate at the 2024 World Championships

They were again fourth in the short program at the 2023 Grand Prix of Espoo, but another second-place free skate won them the bronze medal.

The team's results on the Grand Prix initially had them finishing as first alternates to the Grand Prix Final. They were called up to compete at the Beijing event following the withdrawal of German team Hocke/Kunkel, and came in fourth at the event.

Pavlova/Sviatchenko competed next at the 2024 European Championships, finishing fourth in the short program, less than two points back of third place. They came third in the free skate, winning a bronze small medal, but remained fourth overall, 1.66 points behind bronze medalists Ghilardi/Ambrosini of Italy. They expressed dissatisfaction with the judging of their performances, with Pavlova saying "our motivation goes down every time we keep getting these scores."

Finishing the season at the 2024 World Championships in Montreal, Pavlova/Sviatchenko came sixth in the short program. They moved up to fourth after the free skate, which she called "very motivating for next season."

==== 2024–25 season: Grand Prix silver ====
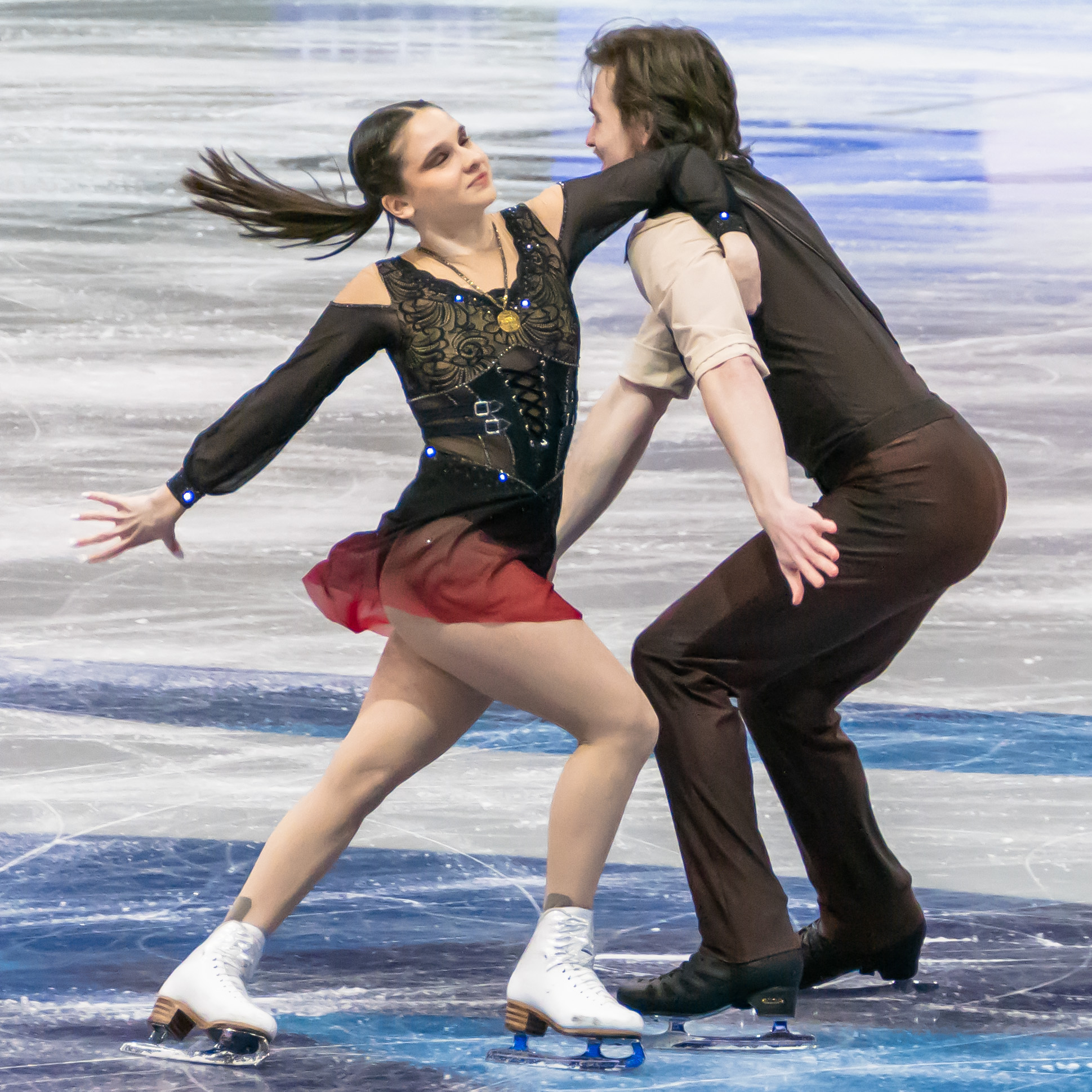
Pavlova and Sviatchenko performing their free skate at the 2025 World Championships

Pavlova/Sviatchenko started the season by competing at the 2024 CS Lombardia Trophy and the 2024 Shanghai Trophy, where they won bronze and gold, respectively.

Going on to compete on the 2024–25 Grand Prix series, they placed fifth at 2024 Skate America. “This wasn’t our best skate for sure," said Pavlova. "We were both a bit sick ahead of this competition. We have some time now to regroup and will be better at the next competition.” They went on to take silver at the 2024 Finlandia Trophy. Pavlova said after the event that Sviatchenko was dealing with a back injury and were not able to practice lifts before coming into the event. "I am surprised that our scores are still higher than at Skate America," she said. "We know though that the judges don’t forgive any mistakes, and we need to practice more.”

Going on to compete at the 2025 European Championships in Tallinn, Estonia, Pavlova/Sviatchenko placed third in the short program and fourth in the free skate, finishing fourth overall, only 0.44 points behind bronze medalists, Metelkina/Berulava. The following month, they competed at the 2025 World Championships in Boston, Massachusetts, United States, where the placed eighth overall after finishing sixth in the short program and eighth in the free skate.

==== 2025–26 season: European bronze, Milano Cortina Olympics ====
Pavlova and Sviatchenko opened the 2025–26 season with a bronze medal at 2025 Grand Prix de France. "We were just really happy to be here, to start the season, and to compete again so we weren't really thinking about medaling," said Pavlova.

Three weeks later, the team took silver at 2025 NHK Trophy, posting a new personal best in both the short program and total score. "I think we are working in the right direction and we just want to continue to improve on everything," said Pavlov. "But we are very happy with the results and our second place.”

The following month, Pavlova and Sviatchenko placed fifth overall at the 2025–26 Grand Prix Final. "We're feeling good," said Pavlova after the free skate. "It was our first clean skate this season, and we're proud of that. We're going in the right direction forward."

In January, the team won the bronze medal at the 2026 European Championships, becoming the first Hungarian pair team to medal since Marianna Nagy and László Nagy in 1957 and the first skaters from Hungary to medal since Júlia Sebestyén in 2004. "It's been a long time since pairs' for Hungary earned a medal," noted Pavlova. "So, I think it's a big achievement for us and for the country. It's an amazing feeling!"

The following month, Pavlova and Sviatchenko placed fourth at the 2026 Winter Olympics in their debut at this event. The team earned highest recorded scores in each segment at this event. Pavlova stated that the team received messages from the fans in Hungary and expressed hope that their performance would lead to an increase in figure skating and pair skating in that country.

In March, Pavlova and Sviatchenko competed at the 2026 World Figure Skating Championships where they placed fifth. The team finished fourth in the short program and sixth in the free skate. “I’m truly exhausted,” said Pavlova after the short program. “This was our first experience to be at the Olympics and then Worlds after the Olympics. I think we always questioned why people withdraw from Worlds after the Olympics. It happens every four years, and we didn’t know why. But now that we experienced it, we understand—because you gave it your all. You gave 100 percent."

== Programs ==
=== Pair skating with Maria Pavlova (for Hungary) ===
Season	Short program	Free skating	Exhibition
2022–23	I See Red by Everybody Loves an Outlaw choreo. by Sofia Evdokimova	Angel by Tokio Myers; Somebody to Love by Queen choreo. by Sofia Evdokimova	Big Spender (from Sweet Charity) by Cy Coleman & Dorothy Fields choreo. by Sofia Evdokimova
2023–24	Another One Bites the Dust by Queen choreo. by Sofia Evdokimova	My Perception of Love by Benjamin Amaru; Iron 2021 by Woodkid choreo. by Sofia Evdokimova	Austin Powers; The "Shag-adelic" Austin Powers Score Medley by George S. Clinton; Shining Star by Earth, Wind & Fire; Hey Goldmember by Beyoncé; Soul Bossa Nova by Quincy Jones
2024–25	Kiss by Prince performed by Tom Jones; Sex Bomb by Tom Jones performed by Tom Jones & Froro choreo. by Sofia Evdokimova	Pirates of the Caribbean; Hoist Your Colours; The Medallion Calls; Up Is Down; Guilty of Being Jack Sparrow; Marry Me by Hans Zimmer & Klaus Badelt choreo. by Sofia Evdokimova	24K Magic by Bruno Mars; U Can't Touch This by MC Hammer; Hips Don't Lie by Shakira ft. Wyclef Jean; Single Ladies (Put a Ring on It) by Beyoncé; Boombastic by Shaggy; Pump It by Black Eyed Peas; Money, Money, Money by ABBA
2025–26	Earth Song by Michael Jackson choreo. by Luca Lanotte	Without You by Ursine Vulpine & Annaca choreo. by Benoît Richaud	Kiss by Prince performed by Tom Jones; Sex Bomb by Tom Jones performed by Tom Jones & Froro choreo. by Sofia Evdokimova

=== With Kvartalova ===
Season	Short program	Free skating
2018–2019	The Feeling Begins by Peter Gabriel choreo. by Roman Soloviev, Valentin Molotov	Rain, In Your Black Eyes by Ezio Bosso choreo. by Roman Soloviev, Valentin Molotov
2017–2018	The Feeling Begins by Peter Gabriel choreo. by Roman Soloviev, Valentin Molotov	Exogenesis: Symphony Part 3 by Muse choreo. by Roman Soloviev, Valentin Molotov

== Competitive highlights ==
- GP – Event of the ISU Grand Prix Series
- CS – Event of the ISU Challenger Series
- TBD – Assigned
- WD – Withdrew from competition

=== Pair skating with Maria Pavlova (for Hungary) ===
Competition placements at senior level
Season	2022–23	2023–24	2024–25	2025–26
Winter Olympics				4th
World Championships	7th	4th	8th	5th
European Championships	5th	4th	4th	3rd
Grand Prix Final		4th		5th
Hungarian Championships	1st	1st		1st
Four Nationals Championships	1st	1st		1st
GP Finland		3rd	2nd	
GP France				3rd
GP NHK Trophy				2nd
GP Skate America			5th	
GP Skate Canada		2nd		
CS Finlandia Trophy		3rd		
CS Golden Spin of Zagreb	9th			
CS Lombardia Trophy			3rd	
CS Nebelhorn Trophy		5th		
Bavarian Open	1st			
Budapest Trophy		2nd		
Challenge Cup	2nd			
Shanghai Trophy			1st	

=== With Labazina for Russia ===
International
Event	2021–22
CS Denis Ten Memorial	9th

=== With Balabanova for Russia ===
National
Event	2020–21
Russian Champ.	10th

=== With Kvartalova for Russia ===
International: Junior
Event	16–17	17–18	18–19
JGP Canada			3rd
JGP Croatia		6th	
Tallinn Trophy	1st	1st	
National
Russian Jr. Champ.	6th	5th	

== Detailed results ==
=== Pair skating with Maria Pavlova (for Hungary) ===
ISU personal best scores in the +5/-5 GOE System
Segment	Type	Score	Event
Total	TSS	215.26	2026 Winter Olympics
Short program	TSS	73.87	2026 Winter Olympics
Short program	TES	41.49	2026 European Championships
Short program	PCS	32.64	2025 NHK Trophy
Free skating	TSS	141.39	2026 Winter Olympics
Free skating	TES	75.50	2026 Winter Olympics
Free skating	PCS	65.89	2026 Winter Olympics

- Small medals for the short program and free skating are only awarded at ISU Championships.

Results in the 2022–23 season
Date	Event	SP		FS		Total	
Date	Event	P	Score	P	Score	P	Score
Dec 7–10, 2022	(Croatia) 2022 CS Golden Spin of Zagreb	9	53.58	9	97.67	9	151.25
Dec 15–17, 2022	(Hungary) 2023 Four Nationals Championships	1	61.84	1	112.01	1	173.85
Dec 15–17, 2022	(Hungary) 2023 Hungarian Championships (Note: In Hungary, the Hungarian Championships are contested as part of the Four Nationals Championships.)	1	—N/a	1	—N/a	1	—N/a
Jan 25–29, 2023	(Finland) 2023 European Championships	6	57.97	4	115.01	5	172.98
Jan 31 – Feb 5, 2023	(Germany) 2023 Bavarian Open	2	65.07	1	112.71	1	177.78
Feb 23–26, 2023	(Netherlands) 2023 International Challenge Cup	4	58.44	2	115.19	2	173.63
Mar 22–26, 2023	(Japan) 2023 World Championships	8	64.43	7	126.24	7	190.67

Results in the 2023–24 season
Date	Event	SP		FS		Total	
Date	Event	P	Score	P	Score	P	Score
Sep 20–23, 2023	(Germany) 2023 CS Nebelhorn Trophy	5	61.34	5	121.26	5	182.60
Oct 4–8, 2023	(Finland) 2023 CS Finlandia Trophy	3	61.66	4	107.73	3	169.39
Oct 12–15, 2023	(Hungary) 2023 Budapest Trophy	1	63.08	2	129.28	2	192.36
Oct 27–29, 2023	2023 Skate Canada International	4	62.22	2	125.56	2	187.78
Nov 10–12, 2023	(Finland) 2023 Grand Prix of Espoo	4	61.53	2	124.66	3	186.19
Dec 7–10, 2023	(China) 2023–24 Grand Prix Final	4	65.51	5	126.51	4	192.02
Dec 14–16, 2023	(Czech Republic) 2024 Four Nationals Championships	1	64.87	1	131.31	1	196.18
Dec 14–16, 2023	(Czech Republic) 2024 Hungarian Championships	1	—N/a	1	—N/a	1	—N/a
Jan 8–14, 2024	(Lithuania) 2024 European Championships	4	65.29	3	128.73	4	194.02
Mar 18–24, 2024	(Canada) 2024 World Championships	6	68.01	4	136.59	4	204.60

Results in the 2024–25 season
Date	Event	SP		FS		Total	
Date	Event	P	Score	P	Score	P	Score
Sep 12–15, 2024	(Italy) 2024 CS Lombardia Trophy	4	66.89	1	129.78	3	196.67
Oct 3–5, 2024	(China) 2024 Shanghai Trophy	1	62.66	1	120.54	1	183.20
Oct 18–20, 2024	(United States) 2024 Skate America	4	65.11	5	118.90	5	184.01
Nov 15–17, 2024	(Finland) 2024 Finlandia Trophy	3	54.33	2	122.92	2	184.21
Jan 28 – Feb 2, 2025	(Estonia) 2025 European Championships	3	65.88	4	125.56	4	191.44
Mar 25–30, 2025	(United States) 2025 World Championships	6	67.45	8	125.84	8	193.29

Results in the 2025–26 season
Date	Event	SP		FS		Total	
Date	Event	P	Score	P	Score	P	Score
Oct 17–19, 2025	2025 Grand Prix de France	3	70.15	3	122.61	3	192.76
Nov 7–9, 2025	(Japan) 2025 NHK Trophy	3	73.04	2	134.24	2	207.28
Dec 4–7, 2025	(Japan) 2025–26 Grand Prix Final	4	72.84	5	135.49	5	208.33
Dec 11–13, 2025	(Slovakia) 2026 Four Nationals Championships	1	76.33	1	137.44	1	213.77
Dec 11–13, 2025	(Hungary) 2026 Hungarian Championships	1	—N/a	1	—N/a	1	—N/a
Jan 13–18, 2026	(United Kingdom) 2026 European Championships	3	73.32	2	129.24	3	202.56
Feb 6–19, 2026	(Italy) 2026 Winter Olympics	4	73.87	3	141.39	4	215.26
Mar 24–29, 2026	(Czech Republic) 2026 World Championships	4	69.92	6	135.16	5	205.08
