= Ioulia Chtchetinina =

Polish retired pair skater (born 1995)

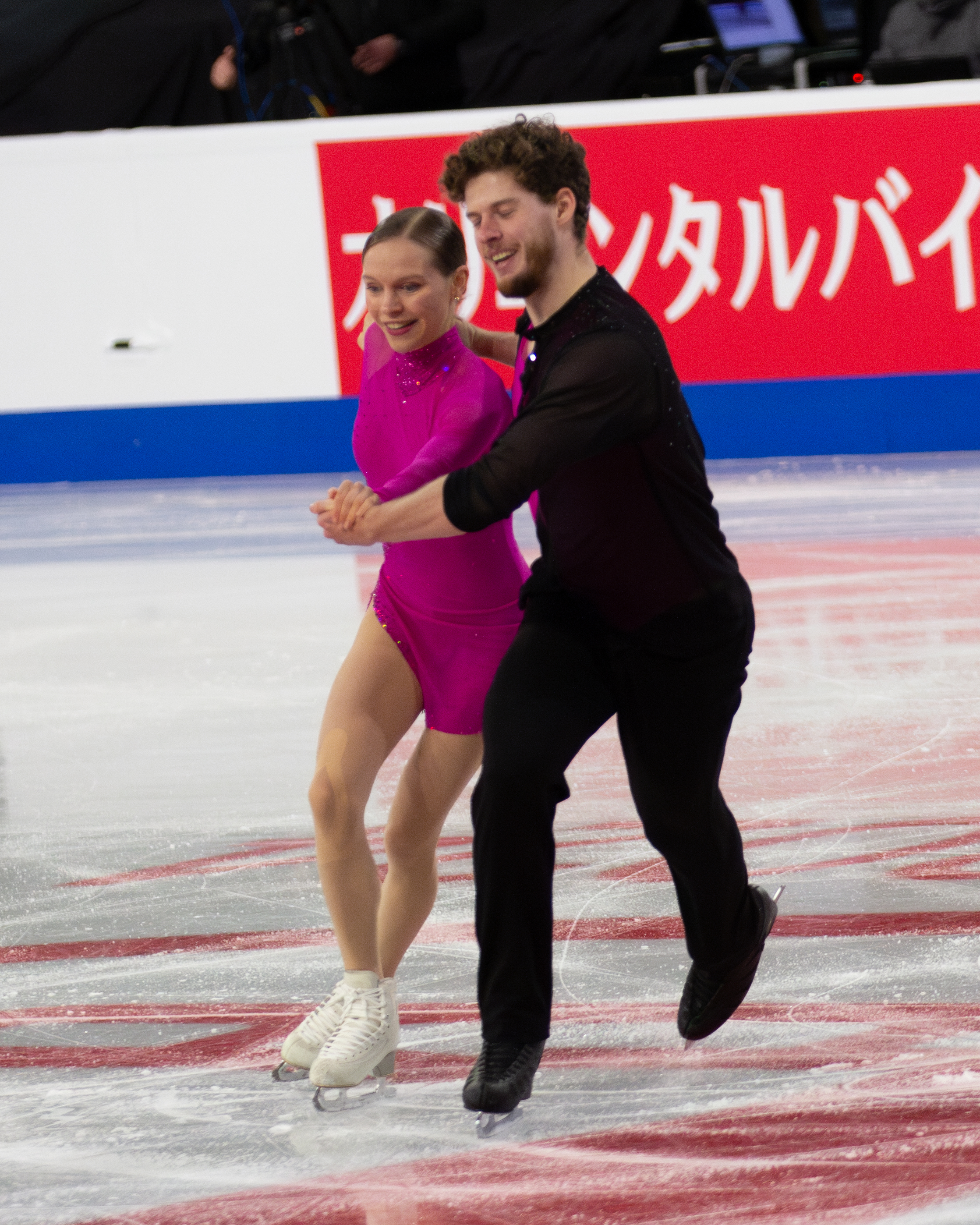
- Ioulia Chtchetinina and Michał Woźniak at the 2024 Skate Canada International

Personal information
- Native name: Юлия Щетинина
- Other names: Julija Scsetyinyina; Julija Ščetinina
- Born: 24 December 1995 (age 30) Nizhny Novgorod, Russia
- Home town: Turgi, Switzerland
- Height: 1.58 m (5 ft 2 in)

Figure skating career
- Country: Poland (2023–26); Hungary (2019–22); Switzerland (2010–19)
- Discipline: Pair skating
- Partner: Michał Woźniak (2023–26); Márk Magyar (2019–22); Mikhail Akulov (2017–19); Noah Scherer (2015–17)
- Coach: Nolan Seegert; Dmitri Savin
- Skating club: UKŁ SPIN Katowice
- Began skating: 2001
- Retired: April 19, 2026

Medal record
Representing Poland
Polish Championships
Gold medal – first place	2024 Turnov	Pairs
Gold medal – first place	2025 Cieszyn	Pairs
Gold medal – first place	2026 Presov	Pairs
Representing Hungary
Hungarian Championships
Gold medal – first place	2020 Ostrava	Pairs
Gold medal – first place	2021 Budapest	Pairs
Gold medal – first place	2022 Spišská Nová Ves	Pairs
Representing Switzerland
Swiss Championships
Gold medal – first place	2017 Lucerne	Pairs
Gold medal – first place	2018 Neuchâtel	Pairs
Silver medal – second place	2016 Prilly	Pairs

Ioulia Chtchetinina (Russian: Юлия Щетинина, Hungarian: Scsetyinyina Julija, Polish: Julia Szczecinina; born 24 December 1995) is a retired Russian-Swiss-Hungarian-Polish pair skater.

Competing for Poland with Michał Woźniak, she is the 2025 Four National champions, the 2024 Four National silver medalists, three-time Polish national champions (2024–26), and the 2024 CS Golden Spin of Zagreb champions. The pair also competed for Poland at the 2026 Winter Olympics.

With her former partner Márk Magyar, she competed for Hungary and is a three-time Hungarian national champion (2020–2022).

Additionally, she is a Swiss national champion with former partners Noah Scherer (2017) and Mikhail Akulov (2018).

== Personal life ==
Chtchetinina was born in Nizhny Novgorod, Russia on December 24, 1995. At the age of three, she and her parents moved to Switzerland.

She became a Hungarian citizen in October 2020 and in September 2025, obtained Polish citizenship.

== Career ==
=== Early career ===
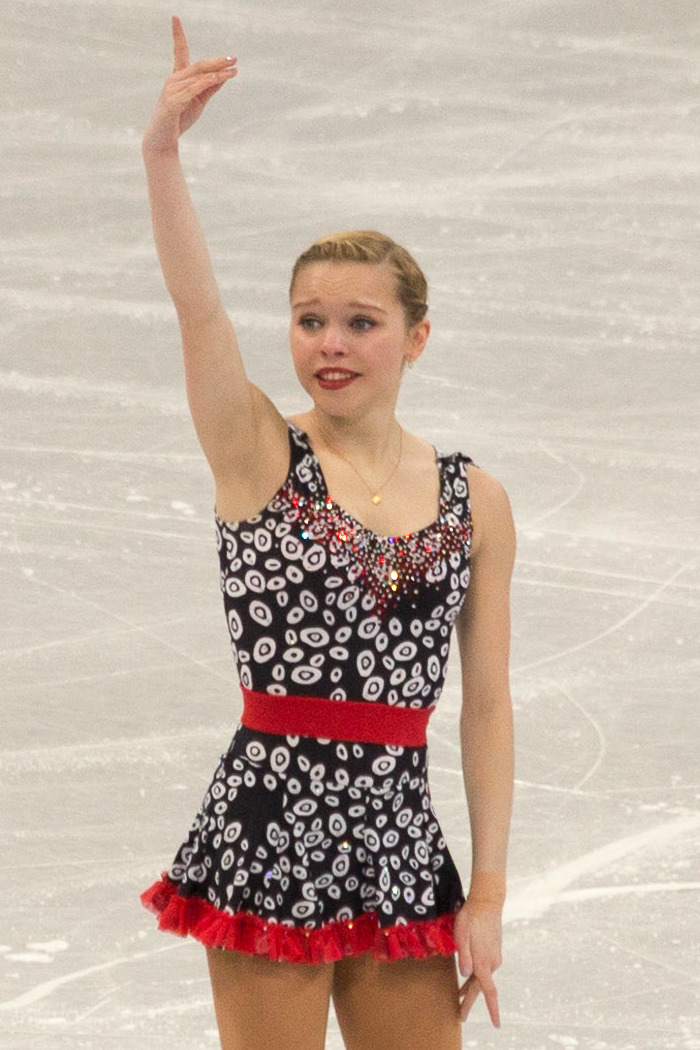
Chtchetinina in 2017

Chtchetinina began figure skating in 2001. She originally competed as a singles skater for Switzerland until 2015, when she decided to switch to pair skating. Her first pair partner was Noah Scherer. The pair was coached by Jean-Francois Ballester and primarily trained in La Chaux-de-Fonds, Switzerland, and Oberstdorf, Germany. Together, they won the 2017 Swiss Championships, competed at two World Championships (eighteenth in 2016 and twenty-eighth in 2017), and finished seventeenth at the 2017 European Championships. In mid-May 2017, the Swiss skating federation announced that the pair had parted ways.

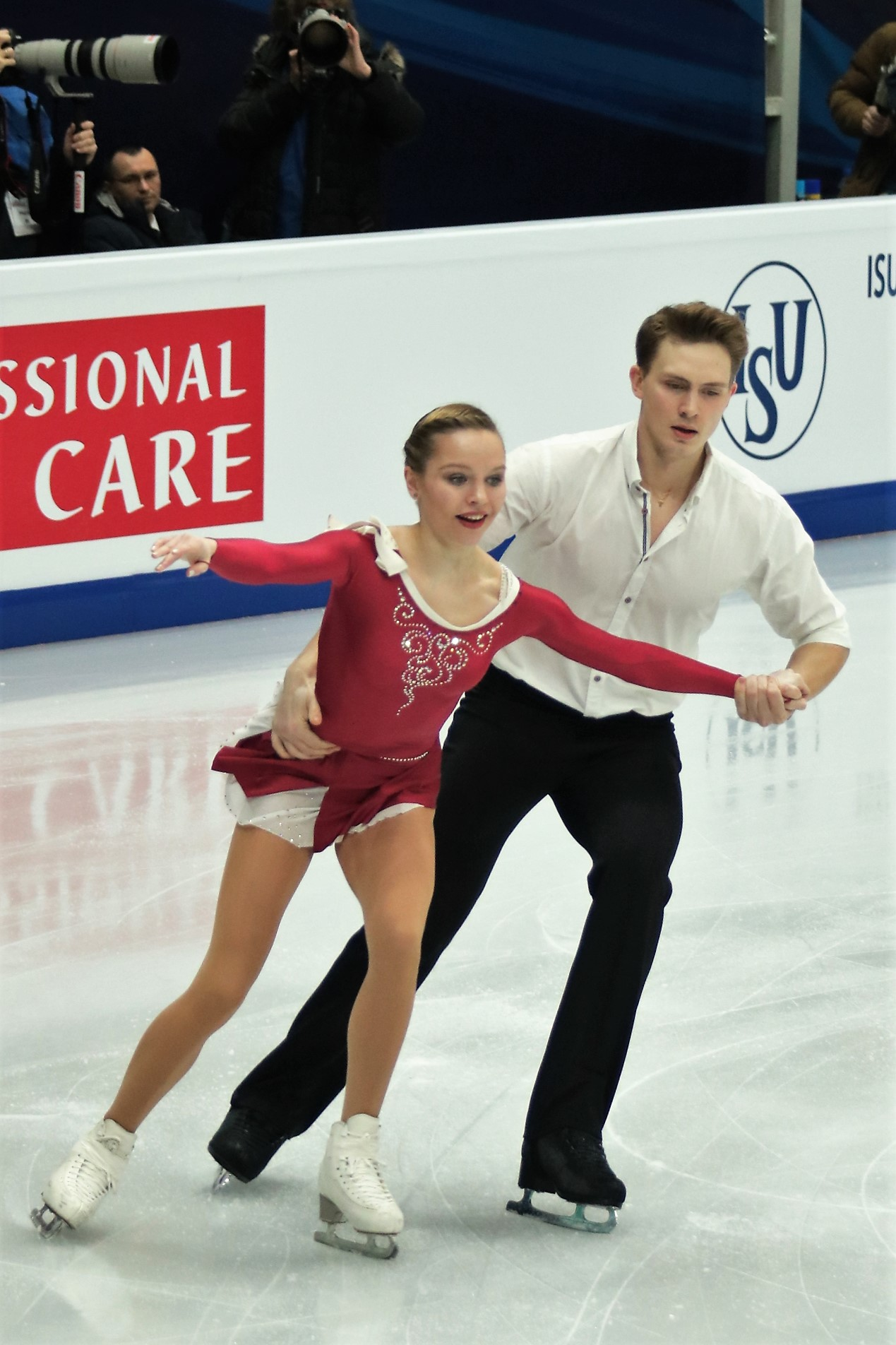
Ioulia Chtchetinina and Mikhail Akulov at the 2018 European Championships

The following season, Chtchetinina teamed up with Ukrainian-Russian pair skater Mikhail Akulov to continue representing Switzerland. They were coached by Juri Larionov in Moscow, Russia, and Jean-Francois Ballester in La Chaux-de-Fonds, Switzerland. Together, the pair won the 2018 Swiss Championships, placed thirteenth at the 2018 European Championships, and twenty-third at the 2018 World Championships. They split following the 2018–19 figure skating season.

=== Partnership with Magyar ===
==== 2019–20 season: Debut of Chtchetinina/Magyar ====
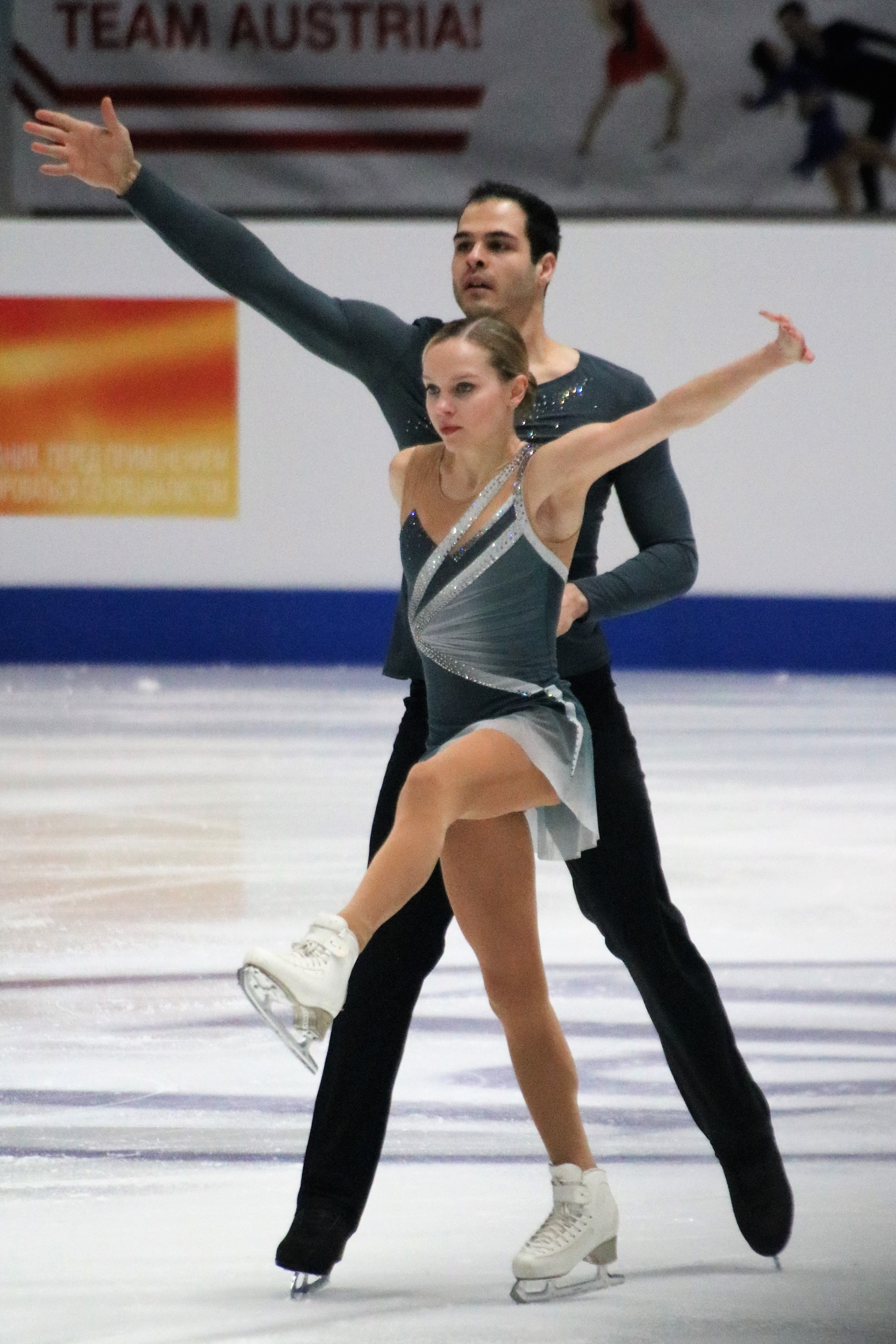
Ioulia Chtchetinina and Márk Magyar at the 2020 European Championships

In August 2019, Chtchetinina announced that she had teamed up with Hungarian pair skater Márk Magyar and that they would be coached by Dmitri Savin and Fedor Klimov in Moscow, Russia. The pair decided to represent Hungary.

Chtchetinina and Magyar started the season by finishing eighth at the 2019 Finlandia Trophy, fourth at the 2019 IceLab International Cup, and fifth at the 2019 Golden Spin of Zagreb.

After winning gold at the 2020 Four National Championships, Chtchetinina and Magyar were selected to represent Hungary at the 2020 European Championships, where they finished tenth. They finished the season with a fourth-place finish at the 2020 Challenge Cup.

==== 2020–21 season: Grand Prix debut ====
Chtchetinina and Magyar started the season by finishing seventh at the 2020 Rostelecom Cup and winning bronze at the 2021 Challenge Cup.

Going on to compete at the 2021 World Championships in Stockholm, Sweden, the pair finished fourteenth.

==== 2021–22 season: Beijing Olympics withdrawal ====
Chtchetinina and Magyar started the season by winning bronze at the 2021 Budapest Trophy and eighth at the 2021 Denis Ten Memorial Challenge. They went on to compete on the 2021–22 Grand Prix Circuit, finishing sixth at the 2021 Internationaux de France and the 2021 Rostelecom Cup.

They won gold at the 2022 Four National Championships for a second time before going on to place sixth at the 2022 European Championships in Tallinn, Estonia.

Although they were set to compete at the 2022 Beijing Winter Olympics, they had to withdraw shortly after arriving due to Magyar testing positive for COVID-19. Their pair parted ways shortly after the event.

=== Partnership with Woźniak ===
==== 2023–24 season: Debut of Chtchetinina/Woźniak ====
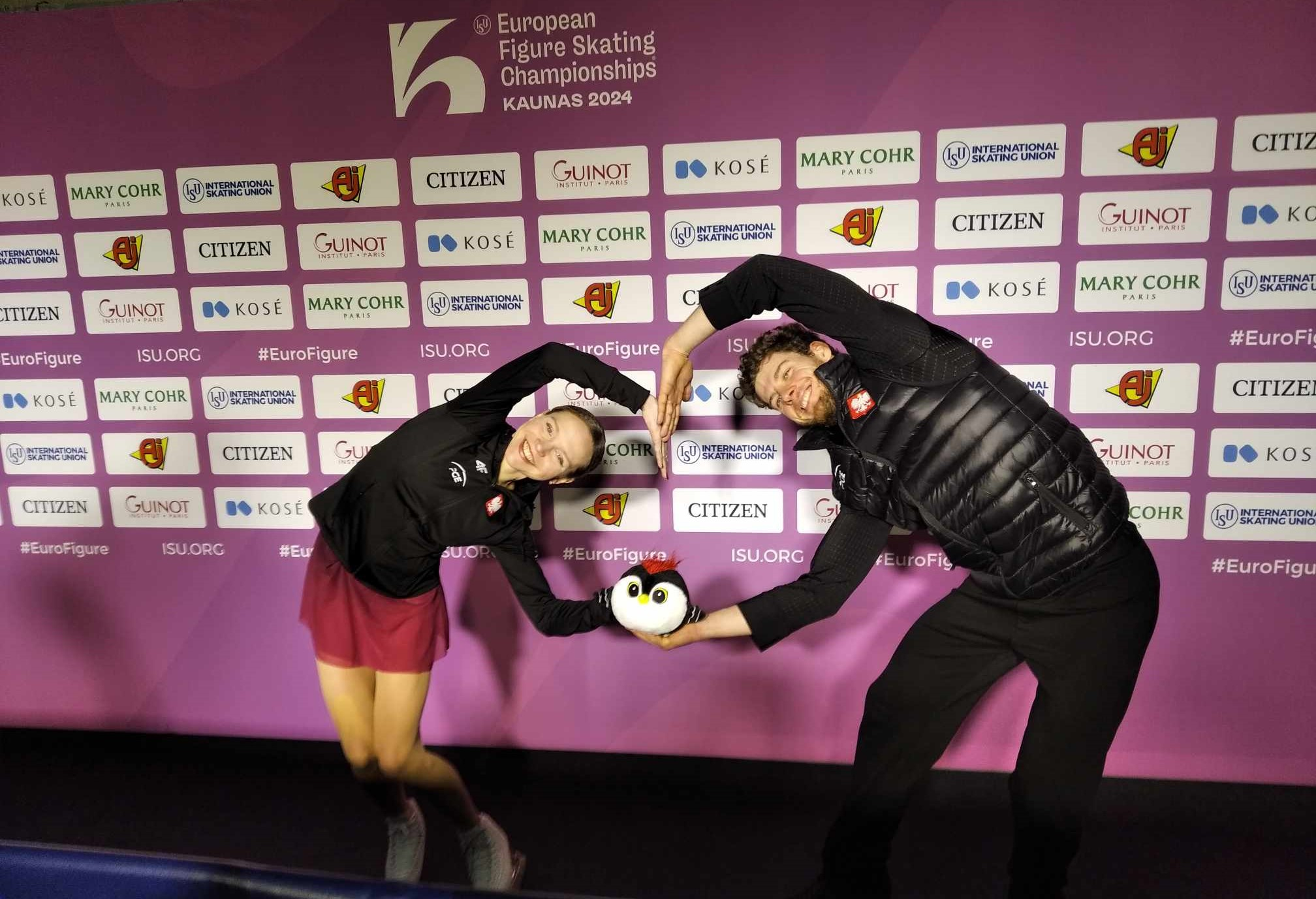
Ioulia Chtchetinina and Michał Woźniak at the 2024 European Championships

Upon learning about the end of Chtchetinina's partnership with Magyar, Polish pair skater Michał Woźniak messaged her on Instagram, asking if she would be interested in having a tryout with him. Despite differences in their levels of experience in the discipline, Chtchetinina agreed to it. The tryout took place in July 2023 and Chtchetinina/Woźniak were officially announced as a new pair team for Poland the following month. The pair ultimately decided to train in Berlin, Germany, as due to the Russian invasion of Ukraine, Chtchetinina no longer wished to continue training in Russia as she previously had. While Nolan Seegert became the team's head coach, Chtchetinina's previous Russian coach, Dmitri Savin, continued working with her and Woźniak through video chat.

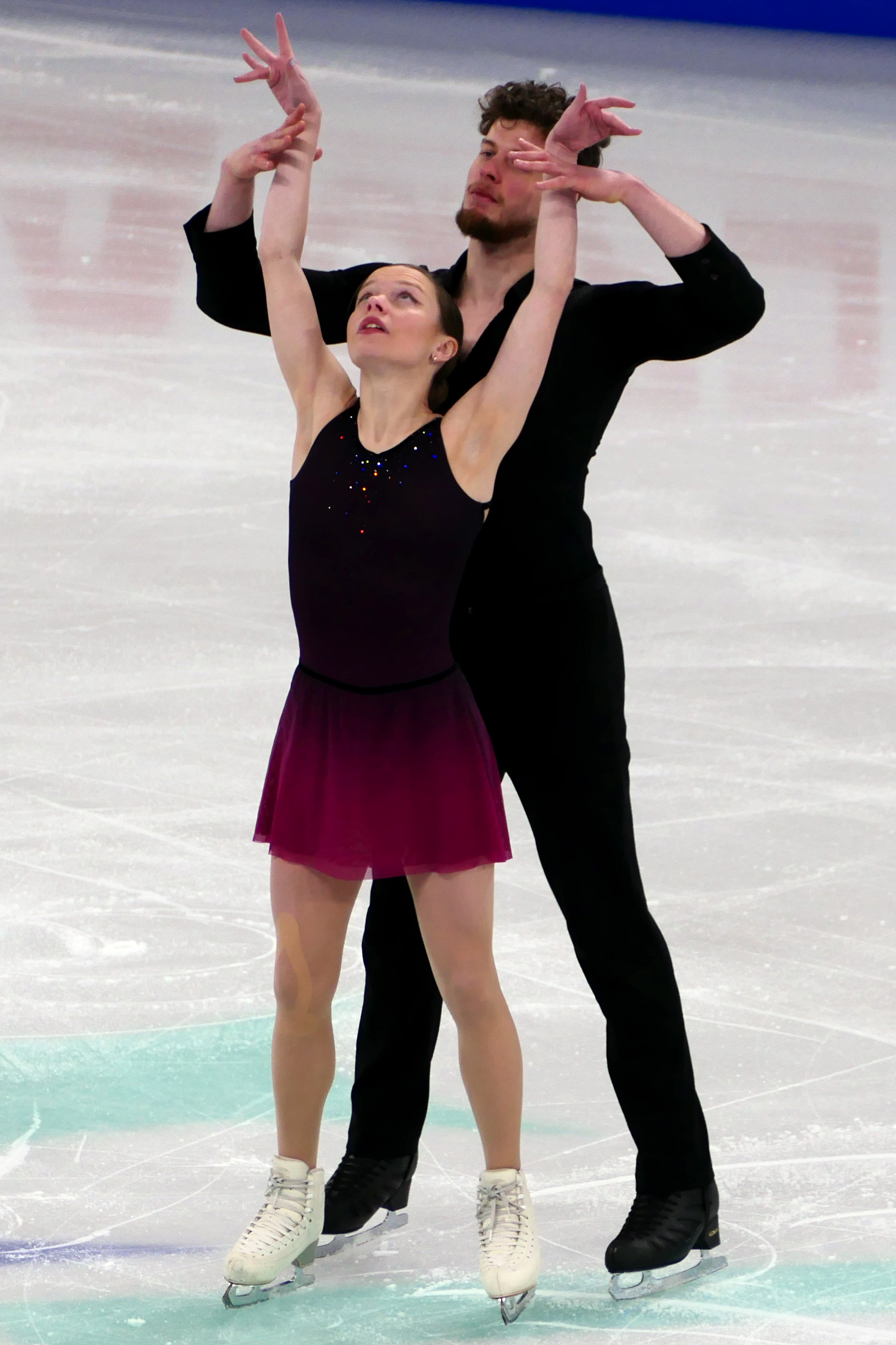
Ioulia Chtchetinina and Michał Woźniak at the 2024 World Championships

Chtchetinina and Woźniak made their international debut at the 2023 Budapest Trophy, where they finished fourth. They next competed at the 2023 Diamond Spin where they placed second. The team claimed their second international medal not long after with a bronze at the 2023 Warsaw Cup. Chtchetinina and Woźniak competed once more before the Polish National Championships, finishing fourth at their first Challenger event, the 2023 Golden Spin of Zagreb.

At the 2024 Four Nationals Championship, Chtchetinina and Woźniak placed second in the combined senior pairs event, but won the Polish national title by default as the sole Polish entrant. Their win yielded assignments to both the 2024 European Championships and the 2024 World Championships. The team competed just once more before the championship season began, winning the silver medal at the 2024 Bavarian Open.

They ultimately finished tenth at the 2024 European Championships and nineteenth at the 2024 World Championships.

=== 2024–25 season: Challenger Series gold ===
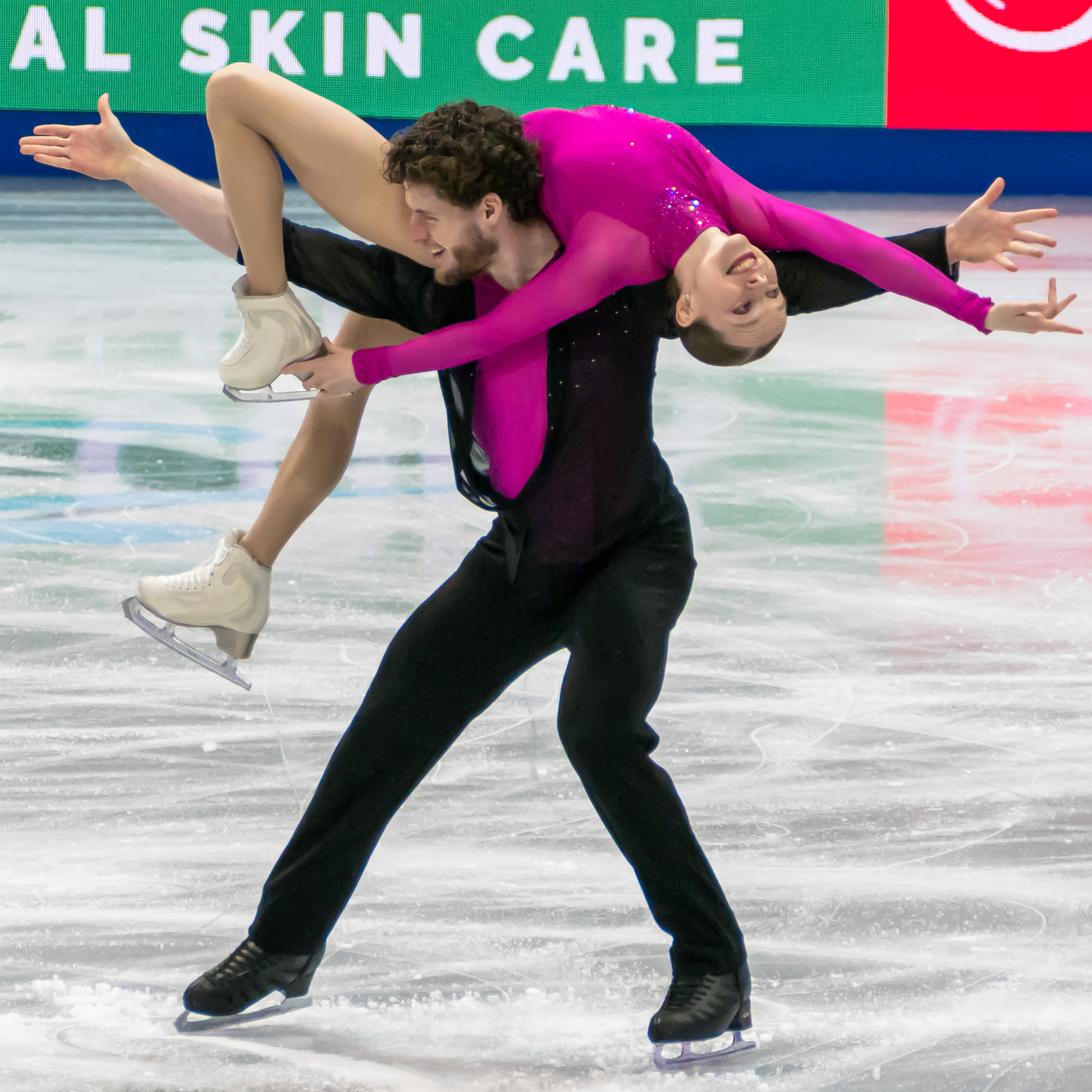
Woźniak and Chtchetinina in the ending pose of their short program at the 2025 World Championships

Chtchetinina/Woźniak opened their second season together at the 2024 Nebelhorn Trophy, where they finished in seventh place. They then went on to take silver at the 2024 Diamond Spin for a second consecutive time.

Following the withdrawal of Italians Lucrezia Beccari and Matteo Guarise, Chtchetinina and Woźniak were assigned to compete on the 2024–25 Grand Prix circuit at 2024 Skate Canada International as substitutes. They finished in sixth place at the event. Chtchetinina and Woźniak were later assigned to the 2024 Cup of China as well, where they finished fourth. The team was happy with their placement, but wanted to hit the 180 mark for the total score.

In December, Chtchetinina/Woźniak won the gold medal at the 2024 Golden Spin of Zagreb. They followed this up with another gold medal at the 2025 Four National Championships.

At the 2025 European Championships in Tallinn, Estonia, Chtchetinina/Woźniak finished in seventh overall after placing seventh in both the short and free program segments. Two weeks later, they won the bronze medal at the 2025 International Challenge Cup.

In March, Chtchetinina/Woźniak competed at the 2025 World Championships, held in Boston, Massachusetts, United States. They placed nineteenth in the short program but following a clean free skate, placed twelfth in that segment and moved up to fourteenth overall. With this placement, Chtchetinina/Woźniak won Poland a quota for pair skating at the 2026 Winter Olympics. In an interview following the free skate, Chtchetinina shared, "I am so thankful to have Michal by my side. He was such a rock for me, and he managed to keep his calm and acted like nothing much happened. I was so disappointed during the short program today. I am so happy that we kept fighting, and today was so much better."

=== 2025–26 season: Milano Cortina Olympics, retirement ===
Chtchetinina/Woźniak started the season by competing on the 2025–26 Challenger Series, finishing thirteenth at the 2025 CS Nebelhorn Trophy and sixth at the 2025 CS Trialeti Trophy. They subsequently competed on the 2025–26 Grand Prix series, placing eighth at both 2025 Skate Canada International and the 2025 Finlandia Trophy.

In December, Chtchetinina/Woźniak won the bronze medal at the 2026 Four National Championships. The following month, they finished eighth at the 2026 European Championships in Sheffield, England, United Kingdom.

In February, Chtchetinina/Woźniak placed eighth in the short program with a new season's best score in the 2026 Winter Olympics Figure Skating Team Event. “After we finished the important element, I started seeing the Olympic rings and getting emotional,” said Chtchetinina. “I had a little stumble, but then I went back into focus. And at the end, during the step sequence, I was just soaking in the moment. I was living the dream.”

Chtchetinina announced her retirement from competitive skating on April 19, 2026.

== Programs ==
=== Pair skating with Michał Woźniak (for Poland) ===
Season	Short program	Free skate	Exhibition	Ref.
2023–24	"Down (Black Caviar Remix)"; By Marian Hill; Choreo. by Robynne Tweedale	"I Love You"; By Woodkid; Choreo. by Maciej Bernadowski		
2024–25	"Moderation"; By Florence and the Machine; Choreo. by Mark Pillay & Paul Boll	"I Love You"; By Woodkid; Choreo. by Maciej Bernadowski	"Down (Black Caviar Remix)"; By Marian Hill; Choreo. by Robynne Tweedale	
2025–26	"Moderation"; By Florence and the Machine; Choreo. by Mark Pillay & Paul Boll	Reel Around the Sun (from Riverdance) By Bill Whelan Choreo. by Mark Pillay & Paul Boll; "I Love You"		

=== Pair skating with Márk Magyar (for Hungary) ===
Season	Short program	Free skating
2021–22	Can't Pretend by Tom Odell choreo. by Dmitri Savin	Dust in the Wind by Kansas choreo. by Dmitri Savin
2020–21	Renaissance (from Medici: Masters of Florence) by Paolo Buonvino & Skin choreo. by Dmitri Savin	Need you tonight; Legendary by Welshly Arms choreo. by Olga Orlova
2019–20	Prodigy by Nathan Lanier choreo. by Nóra Hoffmann	Need you tonight; Legendary by Welshly Arms choreo. by Olga Orlova

=== Pair skating with Mikhail Akulov (for Switzerland) ===
Season	Short program	Free skating
2018–19	Her Lies by Dentro Delay choreo. by Maxim Marinin, Nikolai Morozov	Arrival of the Birds; Transformation by The Cinematic Orchestra choreo. by Maxim Marinin, Nikolai Morozov
2017–18	One More Light by Linkin Park choreo. by Andrei Filonov	My Way performed by Frank Sinatra choreo. by Andrei Filonov

=== Pair skating with Noah Scherer (for Switzerland) ===
Season	Short program	Free skating
2016–17	L'Usine by The Architect	My Immortal by Evanescence
2015–16	Feeling Good performed by Michael Bublé	Skyfall by Adele

== Competitive highlights ==
- GP – Event of the ISU Grand Prix Series
- JGP – Event of the ISU Junior Grand Prix Series
- CS – Event of the ISU Challenger Series
- TBD – Assigned
- WD – Withdrew from competition
- C – Event was cancelled
- Medals at team events are awarded for the team results only. Individual placements at team events are listed in parentheses.

=== Pair skating with Michał Woźniak (for Poland) ===
Competition placements at senior level
Season	2023–24	2024–25	2025–26
Winter Olympics			13th
Winter Olympics (Team event)			10th (8th)
World Championships	19th	14th	
European Championships	10th	7th	8th
Polish Championships	1st	1st	1st
Four Nationals Championships	2nd	1st	3rd
GP Cup of China		4th	
GP Finland			8th
GP Skate Canada		6th	8th
CS Golden Spin of Zagreb	4th	1st	
CS Nebelhorn Trophy		7th	13th
CS Trialeti Trophy			6th
Bavarian Open	2nd		
Budapest Trophy	4th		
Challenge Cup		3rd	
Diamond Spin	2nd	2nd	
Warsaw Cup	3rd		

=== Pair skating with Márk Magyar (for Hungary) ===
Competition placements at senior level
Season	2019–20	2020–21	2021–22
World Championships	C	14th	
European Championships	10th		6th
Hungarian Championships	1st	1st	1st
Four Nationals Championships	1st		1st
GP France			6th
GP Rostelecom Cup		7th	6th
CS Finlandia Trophy	8th		
CS Golden Spin of Zagreb	5th		
Budapest Trophy			3rd
Challenge Cup	4th	3rd	
Denis Ten Memorial			8th
IceLab Cup	4th		

=== Pair skating with Mikhail Akulov (for Switzerland) ===
Competition placements at senior level
Season	2017–18	2018–19
World Championships	23rd	
European Championships	13th	
Swiss Championships	1st	
CS Golden Spin of Zagreb	4th	
CS Ice Star	6th	
CS Nebelhorn Trophy		9th
Challenge Cup	2nd	
Volvo Open Cup	3rd	

=== Pair skating with Noah Scherer (for Switzerland) ===
Competition placements at senior level
Season	2015–16	2016–17
World Championships	18th	28th
European Championships		17th
Swiss Championships	2nd	1st
CS Finlandia Trophy		9th
CS Nebelhorn Trophy		7th
CS Ondrej Nepela Trophy	9th	
CS Warsaw Cup	6th	
Bavarian Open	5th	1st
Cup of Nice	5th	
Hellmut Seibt Memorial	3rd	
NRW Trophy		3rd

=== Single skating (for Switzerland) ===
Competition placements at senior level
Season	2012–13	2013–14	2014–15
Swiss Championships	7th	8th	9th
CS Lombardia Trophy			11th
CS Warsaw Cup			13th
Gardena Spring Trophy	15th		

Competition placements at junior level
Season	2010–11	2011–12	2012–13	2014–15
Bavarian Open			WD	
Cup of Nice			18th	
Gardena Spring Trophy		4th		
NRW Trophy				13th
Triglav Trophy	3rd			
Volvo Open Cup				6th

== Detailed results ==
=== Pair skating with Michał Woźniak (for Poland) ===
ISU personal best scores in the +5/-5 GOE System
Segment	Type	Score	Event
Total	TSS	185.86	2026 Winter Olympics
Short program	TSS	65.23	2026 Winter Olympics
Short program	TES	36.58	2026 Winter Olympics
Short program	PCS	28.65	2026 Winter Olympics
Free skating	TSS	122.74	2024 CS Golden Spin of Zagreb
Free skating	TES	63.47	2024 CS Golden Spin of Zagreb
Free skating	PCS	59.27	2024 CS Golden Spin of Zagreb

Results in the 2023-24 season
Date	Event	SP		FS		Total	
Date	Event	P	Score	P	Score	P	Score
Oct 13–15, 2023	(Hungary) 2023 Budapest Trophy	4	53.42	4	102.74	4	156.16
Oct 19–22, 2023	(Poland) 2023 Diamond Spin	2	53.19	2	109.54	2	162.73
Nov 16–19, 2023	(Poland) 2023 Warsaw Cup	4	47.62	2	105.40	3	153.02
Dec 6–9, 2023	(Croatia) 2023 CS Golden Spin of Zagreb	4	54.12	4	105.03	4	159.15
Dec 14–16, 2023	(Czech Republic) 2024 Four Nationals Championships	3	55.11	2	106.47	2	161.58
Dec 14–16, 2023	(Czech Republic) 2024 Polish Championships (Note: The Polish Championships are contested as part of the Four Nationals Championships.)	1	—N/a	1	—N/a	1	—N/a
Jan 8–14, 2024	(Lithuania) 2024 European Championships	11	53.61	11	101.30	10	154.91
Jan 30 – Feb 4, 2024	(Germany) 2024 Bavarian Open	2	59.33	2	110.43	2	169.76
Mar 18–24, 2024	(Canada) 2024 World Championships	18	56.24	19	99.67	19	155.91

Results in the 2024-25 season
Date	Event	SP		FS		Total	
Date	Event	P	Score	P	Score	P	Score
Sep 19–21, 2024	(Germany) 2024 CS Nebelhorn Trophy	5	60.64	5	113.58	7	174.22
Oct 15–20, 2024	(Poland) 2024 Diamond Spin	2	60.23	2	119.02	2	179.25
Oct 25–27, 2024	2024 Skate Canada International	6	60.87	6	112.97	6	173/84
Nov 22–24, 2024	2024 Cup of China	4	61.11	5	115.93	4	177.04
Dec 4–7, 2024	(Croatia) 2024 CS Golden Spin of Zagreb	2	62.76	1	122.74	1	185.50
Dec 13–15, 2024	(Poland) 2025 Four Nationals Championships	1	62.82	1	121.58	1	184.40
Dec 13–15, 2024	(Poland) 2025 Polish Championships	1	—N/a	1	—N/a	1	—N/a
Jan 28 – Feb 2, 2025	(Estonia) 2025 European Championships	7	60.31	7	117.55	7	177.86
Feb 13–16, 2025	(Netherlands) 2025 Challenge Cup	2	55.19	3	110.17	3	165.36
Mar 25–30, 2025	(United States) 2025 World Championships	19	56.37	12	116.81	14	173.18

Results in the 2025–26 season
Date	Event	SP		FS		Total	
Date	Event	P	Score	P	Score	P	Score
Sep 25–27, 2025	(Germany) 2025 CS Nebelhorn Trophy	13	57.01	12	101.37	13	158.38
Oct 8–11, 2025	(Georgia (country)) 2025 CS Trialeti Trophy	7	55.41	6	108.18	6	163.59
Oct 31 – Nov 2, 2025	2025 Skate Canada International	7	59.76	8	103.46	8	163.22
Nov 21–22, 2025	(Finland) 2025 Finlandia Trophy	8	56.55	8	99.04	8	155.59
Dec 11–13, 2025	(Slovakia) 2026 Four Nationals Championships	2	63.55	3	106.82	3	170.37
Dec 11–13, 2025	(Poland) 2026 Polish Championships	1	—N/a	1	—N/a	1	—N/a
Jan 13–18, 2026	(United Kingdom) 2026 European Championships	10	56.93	8	111.91	8	168.84
Feb 6–8, 2026	(Italy) 2026 Winter Olympics – Team event	8	60.20	—N/a	—N/a	10	—N/a
Feb 6–19, 2026	(Italy) 2026 Winter Olympics	15	65.23	13	120.63	13	185.86
Mar 24–29, 2026	(Czech Republic) 2026 World Championships	13	63.59	11	118.68	11	182.27
