= Rudy Halmaert =

French pair skater

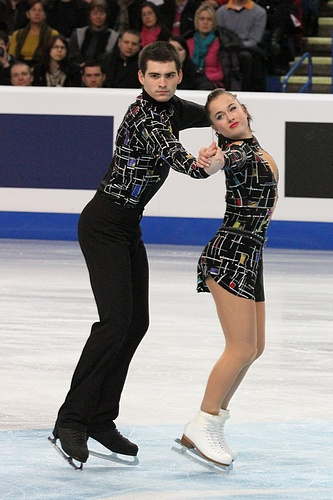

Personal information
- Born: 20 June 1990 (age 36) Enghien-les-Bains, France
- Height: 1.86 m (6 ft 1 in)

Figure skating career
- Began skating: 2000

Medal record
Czech Championships
Gold medal – first place	2012 Ostrava	Pairs

Rudy Halmaert (born 20 June 1990) is a French pair skater who competed with different partners for France, Lithuania, and the Czech Republic. With Alexandra Herbríková for the Czech Republic, he is the 2012 Czech national champion and placed 13th at the 2012 European Championships.

== Programs ==
(with Herbríková)

Season	Short program	Free skating
2011–2012	Glasgow Love Theme by Craig Armstrong	One Day of the City by Christopher Ray

(with Oradauskaite)

Season	Short program	Free skating
2006–2007	Nyah (from Mission Impossible 2) by Hans Zimmer	Modern Times by Charlie Chaplin

== Competitive highlights ==
=== With Herbríková for the Czech Republic ===
Results
International
Event	2011–2012
European Championships	13th
Toruń Cup	3rd
National
Czech Championships	1st

=== With Letscher for France ===
Results
International
Event	2008–2009
Junior Grand Prix, Great Britain	18th

=== With Oradauskaite for Lithuania ===
Results
International
Event	2006–2007
World Junior Championships	16th
Junior Grand Prix, Czech Republic	14th
