= Alexandra Herbríková =

Czech-Swiss pair skater (born 1992)

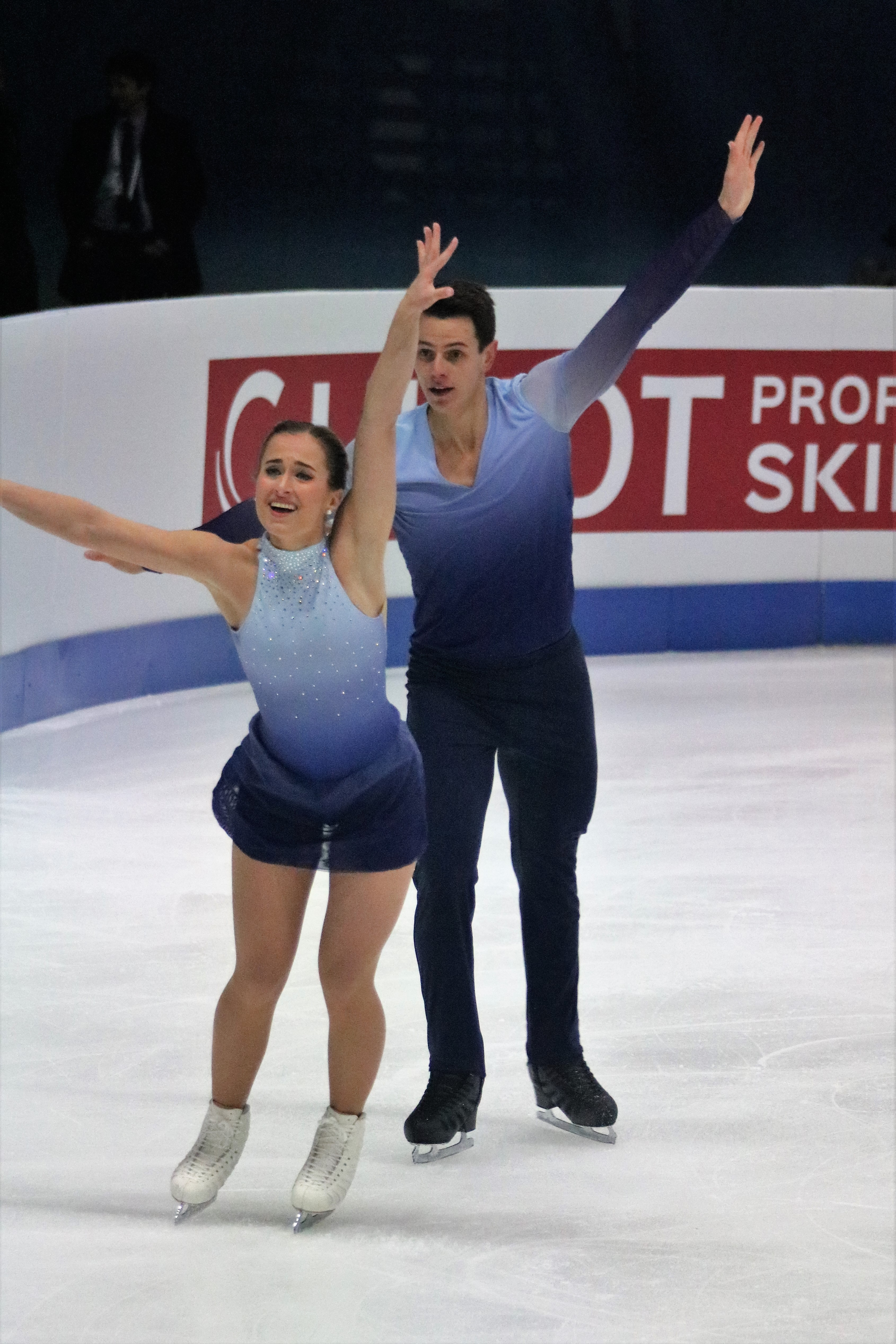
- Herbríková with Nicolas Roulet at the 2020 European Championships

Personal information
- Born: 13 October 1992 (age 34) Bojnice, Czechoslovakia
- Home town: Olomouc, Czech Republic
- Height: 1.63 m (5 ft 4 in)

Figure skating career
- Country: Switzerland
- Partner: Nicolas Roulet
- Coach: Ondřej Hotárek
- Skating club: CP Neuchatel-Sports
- Began skating: 1996

Medal record
Representing Switzerland
Swiss Championships
Gold medal – first place	2015 Lugano	Pairs
Gold medal – first place	2016 Lausanne	Pairs
Gold medal – first place	2019 Wetzikon	Pairs
Gold medal – first place	2020 Biel/Bienne	Pairs
Silver medal – second place	2014 La Chaux-de-Fonds	Pairs
Silver medal – second place	2017 Lucerne	Pairs
Representing Czech Republic
Czech Championships
Gold medal – first place	2012 Ostrava	Pairs
Silver medal – second place	2011 Žilina	Pairs

Alexandra Herbríková (born 13 October 1992) is a pair skater who competes with Nicolas Roulet for Switzerland. They are the 2014 NRW Trophy silver medalists and three-time Swiss national champions.

== Career ==
Herbríková began learning to skate in 1996. Early in her career, she represented the Czech Republic with Lukáš Ovčáček. She Alexandr Zaboev, and Rudy Halmaert.

With Halmaert, she is the 2012 Czech national champion and placed 13th at the 2012 European Championships.

In 2013, Herbríková partnered with Swiss skater Nicolas Roulet. The two decided to compete for Switzerland. They won the silver medal at the 2014 NRW Trophy and finished 16th at the 2016 European Championships.

== Programs ==
=== With Roulet ===
Season	Short program	Free skating
2020–2021	All That Jazz (from Chicago) by Fred Ebb, John Kander	The Mummy by Jerry Goldsmith; Imhotep the High Priest by David Fletcher; Incantation by Benoît Jutras
2016–2017	Grease Lightnin' by Jim Jacob, Warren Casey; Hound Dog by Jerry Laiber, Miko Stoller choreo. by Pierre-Loup Bouquet, B. Appleyard	Tristan et Iseult by Maxime Rodriguez choreo. by Florentine Houdinière
2015–2016	Dead Silence by Charlie Clouser	Chambers by Chilly Gonzalez

=== With Halmaert ===
Season	Short program	Free skating
2011–2012	Glasgow Love Theme by Craig Armstrong	One Day of the City by Christopher Ray

=== With Zaboev ===
Season	Short program	Free skating
2010–2011	Glasgow Love Theme by Craig Armstrong	Doctor Zhivago by Maurice Jarre

=== With Ovčáček ===
Season	Short program	Free skating
2008–2009	Somewhere in Time	Doctor Zhivago by Maurice Jarre

== Competitive highlights ==
GP: Grand Prix; CS: Challenger Series; JGP: Junior Grand Prix

=== With Roulet for Switzerland ===
International
Event	13–14	14–15	15–16	16–17	18–19	19–20	20-21
European Champ.			16th			18th	
CS Finlandia Trophy				8th		11th	
CS Golden Spin						18th	
CS Nebelhorn Trophy				8th			
CS Nepela Trophy			8th				
CS Warsaw Cup			7th			19th	
Bavarian Open		5th		2nd	6th	7th	
Challenge Cup					5th	12th	10th
NRW Trophy		2nd					
Seibt Memorial			4th				
Toruń Cup				6th			
Volvo Open						9th	
National
Swiss Champ.	2nd	1st	1st	2nd	1st	1st	

=== With Ovčáček, Zaboev, and Halmaert for the Czech Republic ===
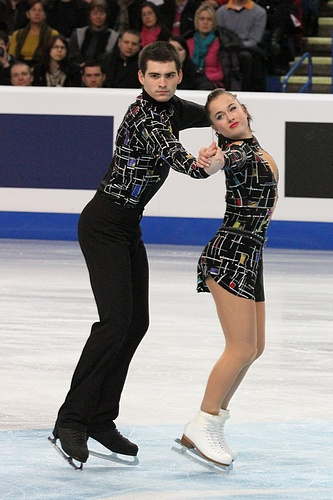
Herbríková / Halmaert at the 2012 European Championships

International
Event	2008–09 (with Ovčáček)	2010–11 (with Zaboev)	2011–12 (with Halmaert)
European Champ.			13th
Toruń Cup			3rd
Warsaw Cup		3rd	
International: Junior
World Junior Champ.	17th		
JGP Austria		14th	
JGP Czech Republic	13th		
JGP United Kingdom	19th		
Warsaw Cup	2nd J		
National
Czech Champ.	1st J	2nd	1st
Levels: N = Novice; J = Junior

=== Singles career ===
National
Event	2007–08	2008–09
Czech Junior Champ.	4th	3rd
