= Magdalena Klatka =

Polish pair skater

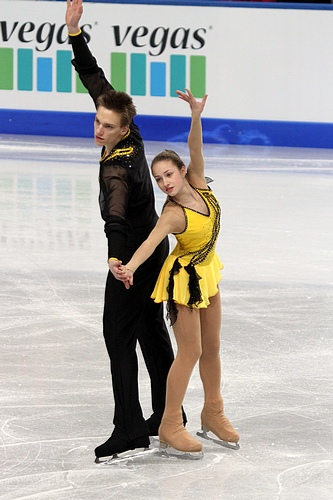

Personal information
- Full name: Magdalena Klatka
- Born: 7 May 1997 (age 29) Oświęcim, Poland
- Home town: Oświęcim
- Height: 1.54 m (5 ft 1 in)

Figure skating career
- Country: Poland
- Partner: Radosław Chruściński
- Coach: Iwona Mydlarz-Chruścińska; Sarkis Tewanian
- Skating club: UKLF Unia Oswiecim
- Began skating: 2002

Magdalena Klatka (born 7 May 1997 in Oświęcim, Poland) is a Polish pair skater. With partner Radosław Chruściński, she is a two-time (2011–2012) Polish national champion.

== Programs ==
(with Chruściński)

| Season | Short program | Free skating |
|---|---|---|
| 2013–2014 | Chopin by Edvin Marton | The Phantom of the Opera on Ice by Roberto Danova |
| 2012–2013 | Chopin by Edvin Marton | The Umbrellas of Cherbourg by Michel Legrand |
| 2011–2012 | Amazonic by Maksim Mrvica | The Umbrellas of Cherbourg by Michel Legrand |
| 2010–2011 | Swan Lake by Pyotr Tchaikovsky | The Addams Family |

== Competitive highlights ==
(with Chruściński)

Results
International
| Event | 2009–10 | 2010–11 | 2011–12 | 2012–13 | 2013–14 |
|---|---|---|---|---|---|
| Worlds | | | | 18th | |
| Europeans | | | | 15th | |
International: Junior
| Junior Worlds | | 14th | 13th | | |
| JGP Austria | | 12th | | | |
| JGP Estonia | | | 7th | | |
| JGP Germany | | 11th | | | |
| JGP Poland | | | 7th | | |
| Ice Challenge | | | 2nd J. | | |
| Warsaw Cup | | 1st J. | 4th J. | | |
National
| Polish Champ. | 3rd | 1st | 1st | | 1st |
JGP = Junior Grand Prix; Levels: N. = Novice; J. = Junior
