= Radosław Chruściński =

Polish pair skater

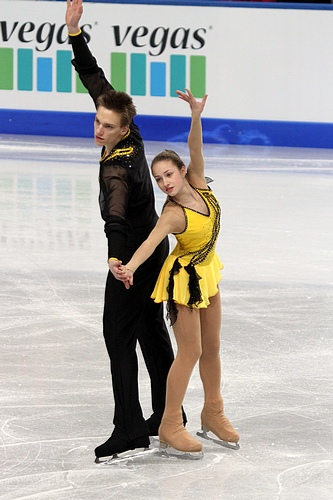

Personal information
- Full name: Radosław Chruściński
- Born: 14 December 1991 (age 34) Katowice, Poland
- Height: 1.88 m (6 ft 2 in)

Figure skating career
- Country: Poland
- Partner: Magdalena Klatka
- Coach: Iwona Mydlarz-Chruścińska; Sarkis Tewanian
- Skating club: UKLF Unia Oswiecim
- Began skating: 1997

Radosław Chruściński (born 14 December 1991 in Katowice, Poland) is a Polish pair skater. With partner Magdalena Klatka, he is a two-time (2011–2012) Polish national champion. His brother, Mateusz Chruściński, was also a pair skater.

== Programs ==
(with Klatka)

Season	Short program	Free skating
2013–2014	Chopin by Edvin Marton	The Phantom of the Opera on Ice by Roberto Danova
2012–2013	Chopin by Edvin Marton	The Umbrellas of Cherbourg by Michel Legrand
2011–2012	Amazonic by Maksim Mrvica	The Umbrellas of Cherbourg by Michel Legrand
2010–2011	Swan Lake by Pyotr Tchaikovsky	The Addams Family

== Competitive highlights ==
(with Klatka)

Results
International
Event	2009–10	2010–11	2011–12	2012–13	2013–14
Worlds				18th	
Europeans				15th	
Nebelhorn Trophy					15th
International: Junior
Junior Worlds		14th	13th		
JGP Austria		12th			
JGP Estonia			7th		
JGP Germany		11th			
JGP Poland			7th		
Ice Challenge			2nd J.		
Warsaw Cup		1st J.	4th J.		
National
Polish Champ.	3rd	1st	1st		1st
