= Mateusz Chruściński =

Polish figure skater

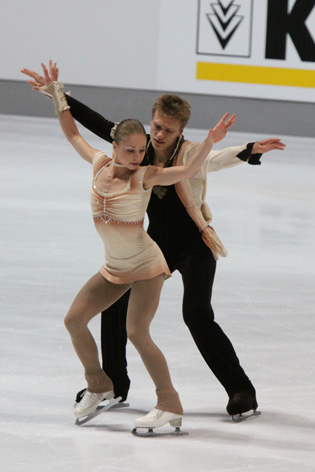
- Sulej and Chruściński in 2009

Personal information
- Full name: Mateusz Chruściński
- Born: 29 November 1987 (age 38) Katowice
- Home town: Oswiecim
- Height: 1.78 m (5 ft 10 in)

Figure skating career
- Country: Poland
- Coach: Iwona Myldarz-Chruścińska; Stanislav Leonovitch
- Skating club: UKLF Unia Oswiecimiu

Mateusz Chruściński (born 29 November 1987 in Katowice, Poland) is a Polish figure skater who competed as a single skater and pair skater. He teamed up with Joanna Sulej in 2008 and began competing internationally with her in the 2008-2009 season. They represented Poland at the 2010 Winter Olympics. They were coached by his mother, Iwona Mydlarz-Chruścińska. His brother, Radosław Chruściński, is also a competitive skater.

As a single skater, he is the 2006 Polish Junior national champion and the 2007 senior national silver medalist. He competed three seasons on the Junior Grand Prix circuit.

== Competitive highlights ==
=== Pairs career ===
(with Sulej)

Event	2008–2009	2009–2010
Winter Olympics		18th
World Championships	19th	15th
European Championships	15th	14th
Polish Championships	1st	1st
Nebelhorn Trophy		10th
Junior Grand Prix, Great Britain	14th	

=== Singles career ===
Event	2002–03	2003–04	2004–05	2005–06	2006–07	2007–08
World Junior Championships				22nd		
Polish Championships					2nd	4th
Polish Junior Championships	1st	2nd	2nd	1st	2nd	
Golden Spin of Zagreb						19th
Coupe de Nice					9th	10th
Merano Cup						3rd
Ondrej Nepela Memorial						15th
Winter Universiade					14th	
JGP Czech Republic					15th	
JGP Norway					19th	
JGP Poland				20th		
JGP Bulgaria				12th		
JGP Romania			11th			
JGP Hungary			23rd			
Warsaw Cup		6th J.	2nd J.	2nd J.		
Grand Prize SNP	6th J.					
J. = Junior level JGP = Junior Grand Prix
