= Skrzek =

Skrzek is a surname. Notable people with the surname include:

- Józef Skrzek (born 1948), Polish multi-instrumentalist
- Kaja Skrzek (born 1998), Polish diver
- Teresa Skrzek (born 1957), Polish pair skater
