= 2021 Four Nationals Figure Skating Championships =

Figure skating competition

- Type: National championship
- Date: 10 – 12 December 2020
- Season: 2020–21
- Location: Cieszyn, Poland
- Host: Polish Figure Skating Association
- Venue: Hala Widowiskowo-Sportowa im. Cieszyńskich Olimpijczyków

Champions
- Men's singles: (Czech Republic) Michal Březina (Poland) Kornel Witkowski (Slovakia) Marco Klepoch
- Ladies' singles: (Czech Republic) Eliška Březinová (Poland) Ekaterina Kurakova (Slovakia) Nicole Rajičová
- Pairs: (Czech Republic) Elizaveta Zhuk / Martin Bidař
- Ice dance: (Poland) Natalia Kaliszek / Maksym Spodyriev
- Previous: 2020 Four National Championships
- Next: 2022 Four National Championships

The 2021 Four Nationals Figure Skating Championships were held from 10 to 12 December 2020 in Cieszyn, Poland. It served as the national championships for the Czech Republic, Poland, and Slovakia; traditionally, Hungary has also participated. Hungary not participated in this year, but organized an own National Championship at Budapest from 18 to 18 December. The three highest-placing skaters from each country formed their national podiums, after the competition results were split. Medals were awarded in men's singles, ladies' singles, pair skating, and ice dance on the senior and junior levels. Due to the COVID-19 pandemic, several skaters training abroad competed virtually via video submissions. The results were among the criteria used by each national federation to determine international assignments.

== Medals summary ==
=== Senior ===
Nation	Discipline	Gold	Silver	Bronze
Czech Republic	Men	Michal Březina	Jiří Bělohradský	Georgii Reshtenko
Czech Republic	Ladies	Eliška Březinová	Nikola Rychtaříková	Olusa Gajdosova
Czech Republic	Pairs	Elizaveta Zhuk / Martin Bidař	No other competitors	
Czech Republic	Ice dance	No competitors		
Poland	Men	Kornel Witkowski	Łukasz Kędzierski	Miłosz Witkowski
Poland	Ladies	Ekaterina Kurakova	Elżbieta Gabryszak	Natalia Lerka
Poland	Pairs	No competitors		
Poland	Ice dance	Natalia Kaliszek / Maksym Spodyriev	Anastasia Polibina / Pavel Golovishnikov	Jenna Hertenstein / Damian Binkowski
Slovakia	Men	Marco Klepoch	No other competitors	
Slovakia	Ladies	Nicole Rajičová	Alexandra Michaela Filcová	Ema Doboszová
Slovakia	Pairs	No competitors		
Slovakia	Ice dance	No competitors		

=== Junior ===
Nation	Discipline	Gold	Silver	Bronze
Czech Republic	Pairs	Barbora Kuciánová / Lukáš Vochozka	No other competitors	
Czech Republic	Ice dance	Denisa Cimlová / Vilém Hlavsa	Adéla Pejchová / Filip Mencl	Barbora Zelená / Jáchym Novák
Poland	Pairs	No competitors		
Poland	Ice dance	Olivia Oliver / Joshua Andari	Arina Klimova / Filip Bojanowski	Sofiia Dovhal / Wiktor Kulesza
Slovakia	Pairs	Margaréta Mušková / Oliver Kubacak	No competitors	
Slovakia	Ice dance	No competitors		

== Senior results ==
=== Men ===
Michal Březina of the Czech Republic, who trains in the United States, competed virtually.

Rank	Name	Nation	Total points	SP		FS	
1	Michal Březina	Czech Republic	221.52	1	81.03	1	140.49
2	Jiří Bělohradský	Czech Republic	193.67	2	69.45	2	124.22
3	Kornel Witkowski	Poland	169.60	4	61.19	3	108.41
4	Łukasz Kędzierski	Poland	165.87	3	61.46	5	106.74
5	Miłosz Witkowski	Poland	159.06	5	52.32	4	104.41
6	Georgii Reshtenko	Czech Republic	150.96	5	47.08	5	103.88
7	Piotr Wiśniewski	Poland	116.38	7	40.54	7	75.84
8	Marco Klepoch	Slovakia	113.57	8	40.22	8	73.35
9	Ludwik Piksa	Poland	88.85	9	23.60	9	65.25

=== Ladies ===
Rank	Name	Nation	Total points	SP		FS	
1	Ekaterina Kurakova	Poland	178.54	1	57.64	1	120.90
2	Eliška Březinová	Czech Republic	146.84	5	46.84	2	100.00
3	Nikola Rychtaříková	Czech Republic	138.25	3	49.01	3	89.24
4	Elżbieta Gabryszak	Poland	127.05	4	48.33	5	78.72
5	Nicole Rajičová	Slovakia	124.85	2	52.55	9	72.30
6	Alexandra Michaela Filcová	Slovakia	120.27	10	36.72	4	83.55
7	Natalia Lerka	Poland	115.60	7	40.80	6	74.80
8	Ema Doboszová	Slovakia	112.63	6	41.86	11	70.77
9	Agnieszka Rejment	Poland	108.52	8	37.89	12	70.63
10	Karolina Białas	Poland	108.48	11	35.53	8	72.95
11	Laura Szczęsna	Poland	106.65	13	33.02	7	73.63
12	Aleksandra Rudolf	Poland	101.70	12	35.19	13	66.51
13	Olusa Gajdosova	Czech Republic	101.61	17	30.79	10	70.82
14	Martyna Grocholska	Poland	97.99	9	36.74	17	61.25
15	Dominika Motlochová	Czech Republic	96.65	14	32.27	15	64.38
16	Amelia Konik	Poland	95.00	18	29.30	14	65.70
17	Nicola Adamczyk	Poland	94.33	15	31.32	16	63.01
18	Claudia Mifkovičová	Slovakia	84.47	16	30.87	18	53.60

=== Pairs ===
Rank	Name	Nation	Total points	SP		FS	
1	Elizaveta Zhuk / Martin Bidař	Czech Republic	143.50	1	55.83	1	87.67
WD	Anna Hernik / Michal Wozniak	Poland	withdrew	2	38.02	withdrew from competition	

=== Ice dance ===
Jenna Hertenstein / Damian Binkowski of Poland, who train in the United States, competed virtually.

Rank	Name	Nation	Total points	RD		FD	
1	Natalia Kaliszek / Maksym Spodyriev	Poland	181.98	1	77.04	1	104.94
2	Anastasia Polibina / Pavel Golovishnikov	Poland	157.84	2	61.90	2	95.94
3	Jenna Hertenstein / Damian Binkowski	Poland	136.88	3	51.82	3	85.06

== Junior results ==
=== Pairs ===
Rank	Name	Nation	Total points	SP		FS	
1	Barbora Kuciánová / Lukáš Vochozka	Czech Republic	112.33	1	43.73	1	68.60
2	Margaréta Mušková / Oliver Kubacak	Slovakia	97.10	2	38.41	2	58.69

=== Ice dance ===
Olivia Oliver / Joshua Andari of Poland, who train in Canada, competed virtually.

Rank	Name	Nation	Total points	RD		FD	
1	Denisa Cimlová / Vilém Hlavsa	Czech Republic	148.93	1	58.96	1	89.97
2	Olivia Oliver / Joshua Andari	Poland	129.98	3	51.67	2	78.31
3	Arina Klimova / Filip Bojanowski	Poland	127.50	2	52.47	3	75.03
4	Sofiia Dovhal / Wiktor Kulesza	Poland	118.37	4	43.55	4	74.82
5	Adéla Pejchová / Filip Mencl	Czech Republic	106.12	5	43.06	5	63.06
6	Barbora Zelená / Jáchym Novák	Czech Republic	100.32	6	41.43	6	58.89
