= Anastasia Vykhodtseva =

Polish figure skater

Personal information
- Born: 20 May 1991 (age 35) Dnepropetrovsk, Ukraine
- Home town: Toruń, Poland
- Height: 1.60 m (5 ft 3 in)

Figure skating career
- Began skating: 1996

Anastasia Vykhodtseva (Анастасія Виходцева, born 20 May 1991 in Dnepropetrovsk) is a Polish-Ukrainian former figure skater who used to start in ice dance category.

At first she started for Ukraine (with Alexei Shumski and Artem Farin), but then changed the country for Poland and skated with Jan Mościcki. Having given up the competitive skating, she became a coach and choreographer in Toruń, Poland. Among her skaters and former skaters are Natalia Kaliszek and Maksym Spodyriev, Agnieszka Rejment and Aleksandra Rudolf.

== Competitive highlights ==
=== with Mościcki, for Poland ===
Event	2009-10
Polish Championships	1st
Golden Spin of Zagreb	9th

=== with Shumski, for Ukraine ===
International
Event	2005–06	2006–07	2007–08	2008–09
JGP Austria			4th	
JGP Bulgaria			3rd	
JGP Canada	9th			
JGP Croatia	9th			
JGP France				7th
JGP Netherlands		8th		
JGP Spain				3rd
Grand Prize SNP			1st J	
National
Ukrainian Champ.	5th			
J = Junior level

=== with Farin, for Ukraine ===
Event	2004–05
Ukrainian Champ.	7th J.
J = Junior level
