= Polish Figure Skating Championships =

Recurring figure skating competition

- Status: Active
- Genre: National championships
- Frequency: Annual
- Country: Poland
- Inaugurated: 1922
- Previous event: 2026 Four Nationals Championships
- Next event: 2027 Four Nationals Championships
- Organizer: Polish Figure Skating Association

The Polish Figure Skating Championships (Polish: Mistrzostwa Polski w łyżwiarstwie figurowym) are an annual figure skating competition organized by the Polish Figure Skating Association (Polish: Polski Związek Łyżwiarstwa Figurowego) to crown the national champions of Poland. The first official Polish Championships were held in 1922 in Warsaw and consisted of events in speed skating and figure skating. Since 2014, the senior-level championships, as well as the junior-level pair skating and ice dance championships, have been held in conjunction with the skating federations of the Czech Republic, Hungary, and Slovakia as part of the Four Nationals Figure Skating Championships. Junior-level singles skaters compete in a separate competition that is exclusive to Poland.

Medals are awarded in men's singles, women's singles, pair skating, and ice dance at the senior and junior levels, although each discipline may not necessarily be held every year due to a lack of participants. Robert Grzegorczyk currently holds the record for winning the most Polish Championship titles in men's singles (with seven), while Ekaterina Kurakova holds the title in women's singles (with eight). Two teams are tied for winning the most titles in pair skating (with nine each): Zofia Bilorówna and Tadeusz Kowalski, and Dorota Zagorska and Mariusz Siudek. Siudek also won two additional titles with previous partners. Teresa Weyna and Piotr Bojańczyk hold the record in ice dance (with nine).

== History ==
Ice skating debuted in Poland in the mid-1800s. The first artificial art rink in Poland was created in 1865 in Łazienki Park in Warsaw. The Polish Skating Association (Polish: Polski Związek Łyżwiarski) was established in 1921 to oversee both figure skating and speed skating, and joined the International Skating Union in 1922. The first Polish Skating Championships were held the following year in Warsaw; Władysław Kuchar won the singles event, while Olga Przeździemirska and Henryk Krukowicz-Przedrzymirski won the pairs event. No competitions were held in 1925 or 1926. A separate event for women was added in 1930; Barbara Chachlewska was the inaugural women's champion. Competitions were repeatedly interrupted early on, especially during the occupation of Poland during World War II.

A number of milestone events occurred in 1957. The Polish Skating Association was divided into two separate associations: one for figure skating (Polish: Polski Związek Łyżwiarstwa Figurowego) and one for speed skating (Polish: Polski Związek Łyżwiarstwa Szybkiego). The first indoor ice rink in Warsaw – Torwar – was opened. Ice dance was also added to the national championships in 1957; Anna Bursche-Lindnerowa and Leon Osadnik were the first Polish ice dance champions.

Poland currently holds its senior-level championships, as well as its junior-level pairs and ice dance championships, as part of the Four Nationals Figure Skating Championships. After the dissolution of Czechoslovakia in 1992, the Czech Skating Association and the Slovak Figure Skating Association ran independent national championships until the 2006–07 season, when the two associations joined their national championships together as one event. The Czech Republic and Slovakia alternated as hosts for the combined championships until the 2008–09 season, when Poland joined and the Three Nationals Figure Skating Championships were officially formed. Since the addition of Hungary during the 2013–14 season, the event has been known as the Four Nationals Figure Skating Championships. The four nations rotate as hosts, while skaters from the four countries compete together and the results are then split at the end of the competition to form national podiums.

== Senior medalists ==
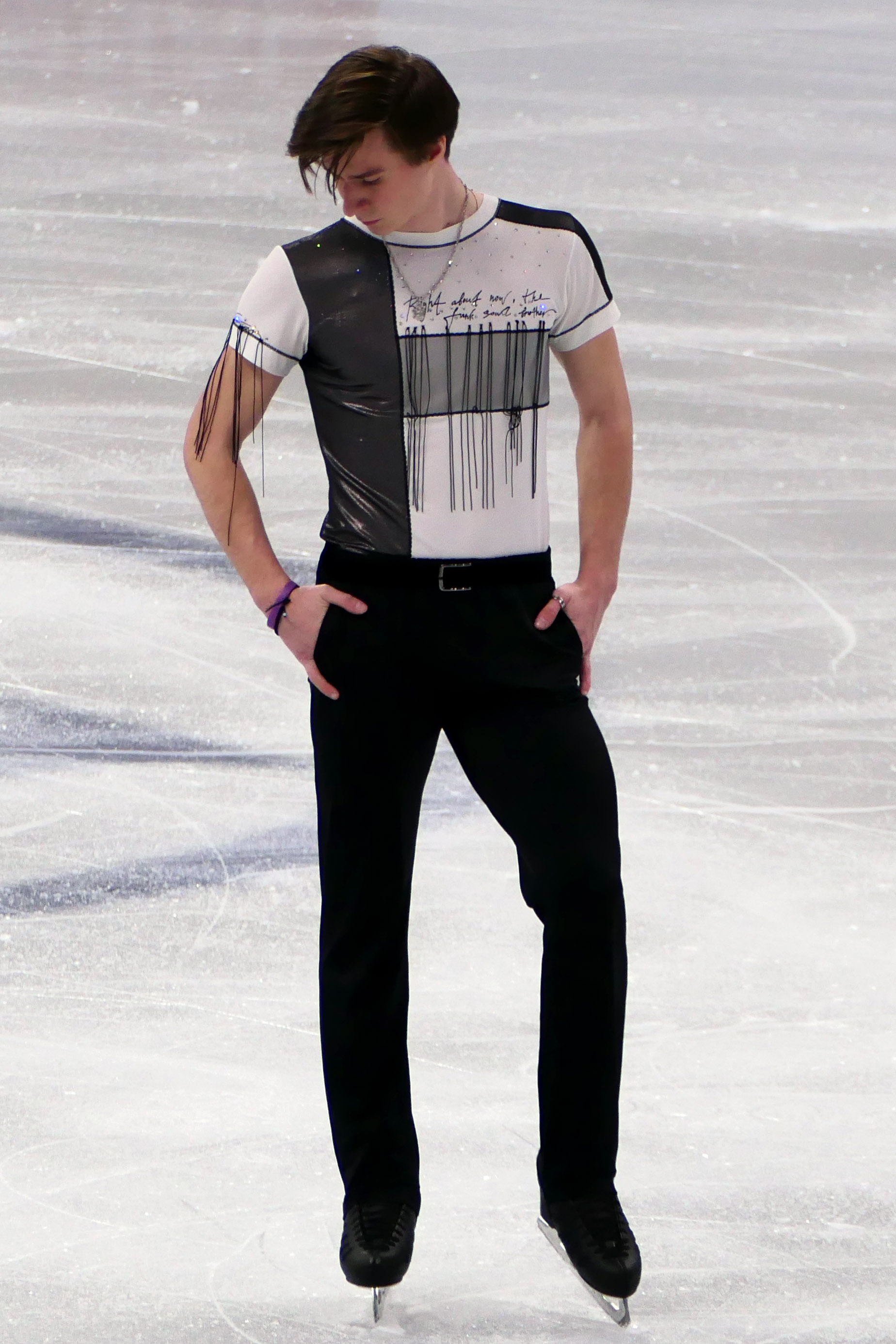
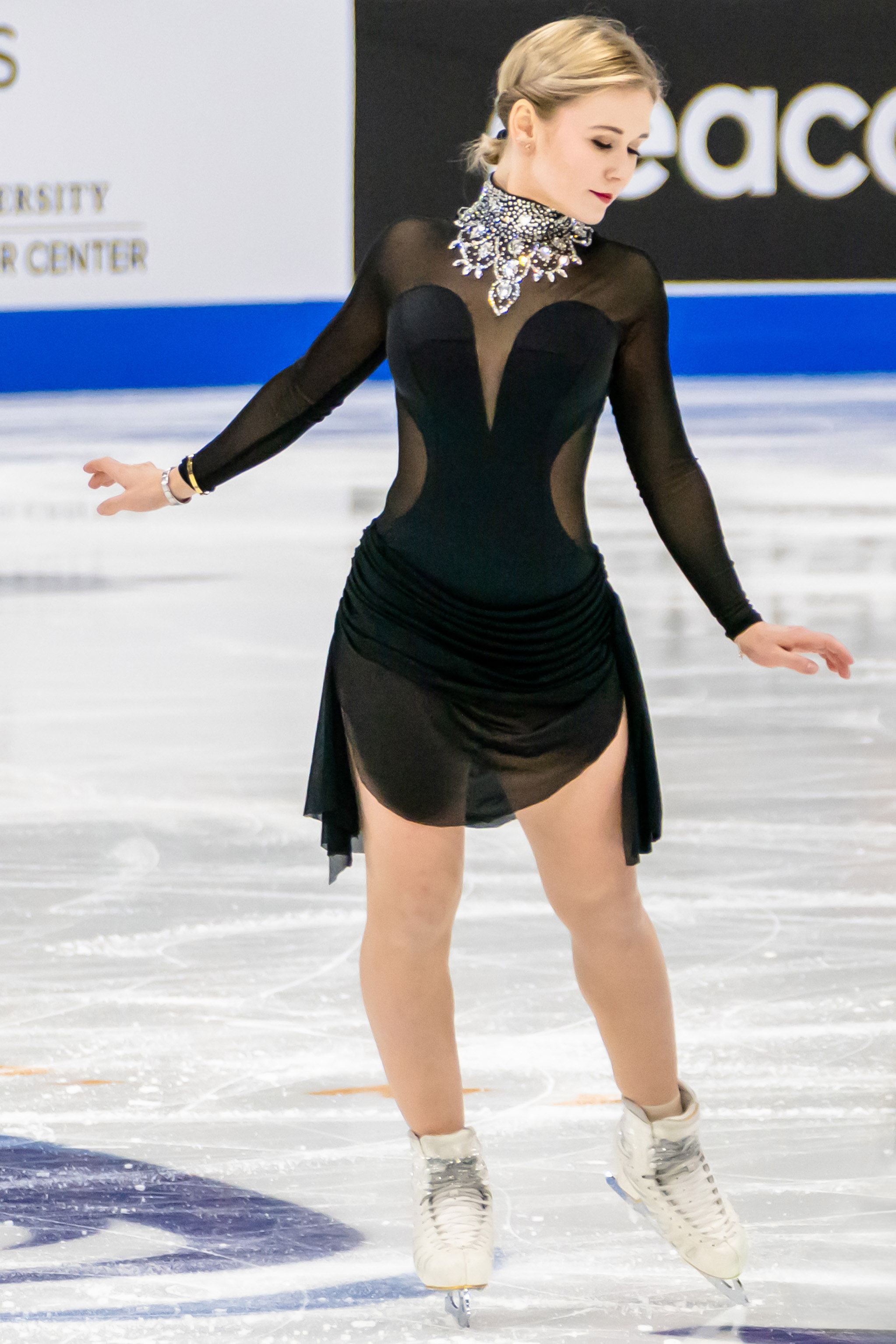
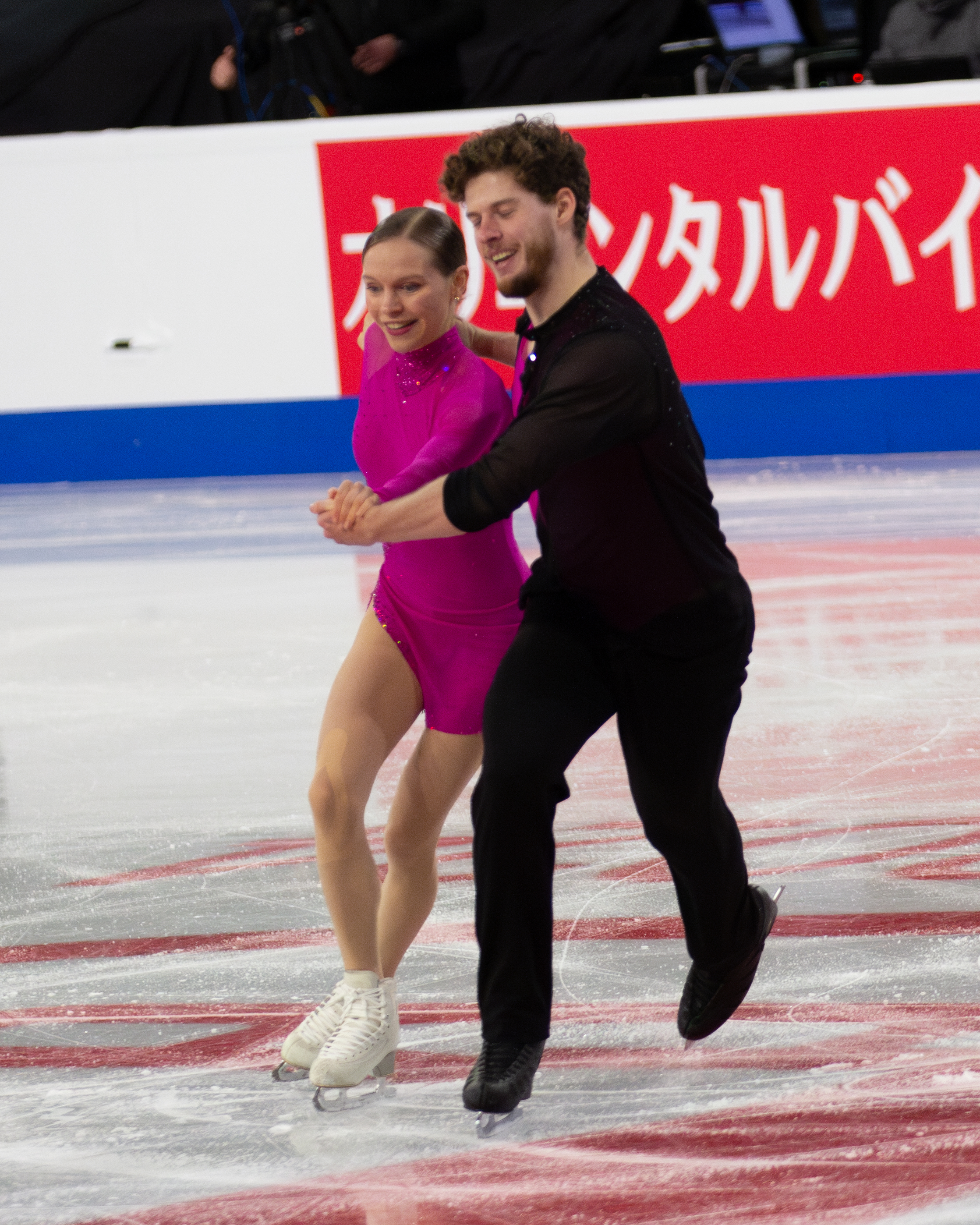
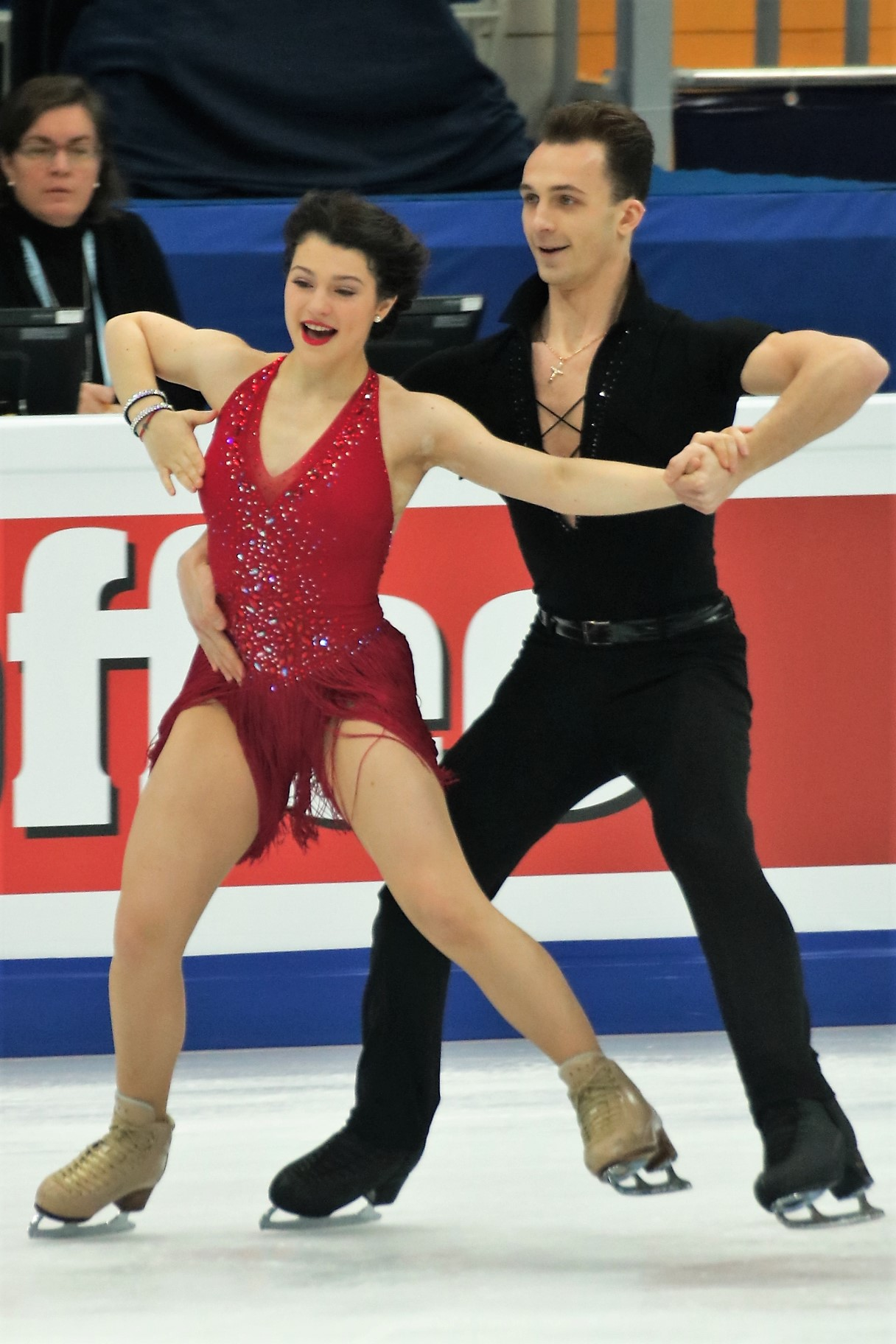
From left to right: Vladimir Samoilov, five-time Polish champion in men's singles; Ekaterina Kurakova, eight-time Polish champion in women's singles; Ioulia Chtchetinina and Michał Woźniak, three-time Polish champions in pair skating; and Natalia Kaliszek and Maksym Spodyriev, eight-time Polish champions in ice dance

=== Men's singles ===
Senior men's event medalists
Year	Location	Gold	Silver	Bronze	Ref.
1922	Warsaw	Władysław Kuchar	Roman Kikiewicz	Józef Łapiński	
1923	Lviv (Note: Lviv, in present-day Ukraine, was at this point in time called Lwów and was part of the Second Polish Republic.)	Roman Kikiewicz	Władysław Kuchar	No other competitors	
1924	Warsaw	Roman Kikiewicz	Zygmunt Ziemski	No other competitors	
1925–26	No competitions held				
1927	Warsaw	Roman Kikiewicz	No other competitors		
1928	Lviv	Roman Kikiewicz	Władysław Kuchar	No other competitors	
1929	Lviv	Roman Kikiewicz	Zbigniew Iwasiewicz	No other competitors	
1930	Warsaw	Roman Kikiewicz	Zbigniew Iwasiewicz	No other competitors	
1931	Katowice	Zbigniew Iwasiewicz	Mr. Noskiewicz	Mr. Marmal	
1932	Zakopane	Zbigniew Iwasiewicz	Bolesław Staniszewski	Mr. Marmal	
1933	Katowice (Note: The 1933 Polish Championships were originally scheduled to be held in Bielsko, but the decision was made to relocate the competition to Katowice the day before it began.)	Zbigniew Iwasiewicz	Bolesław Staniszewski	Walter Grobert	
1934	Warsaw	Bolesław Staniszewski	Zbigniew Iwasiewicz	Paweł Breslauer	
1935	Katowice	Walter Grobert	Bolesław Staniszewski	Paweł Breslauer	
1936	No competition held				
1937	Katowice	Paweł Breslauer	Walter Grobert	Henryk Kosiorek	
1938	Zakopane	Walter Breslauer	Paweł Breslauer	Henryk Kosiorek	
1939–46	No competitions due to World War II				
1947	Warsaw	Henryk Kosiorek	Józef Standzina	No other competitors	
1948	No competition held				
1949	Karpacz	Paweł Wrocławski	Bolesław Staniszewski	Walter Grobert	
1950	Zakopane	Leon Osadnik	Karol Sojka	Bolesław Staniszewski	
1951	Zakopane	Karol Sojka	Leon Osadnik	Walter Grobert	
1952	Zakopane	Leon Osadnik	Karol Sojka	Józef Standzina	
1953	Katowice	Karol Sojka	Leon Osadnik	Henryk Szymocha	
1954	Warsaw	Leon Osadnik	Emanuel Koczyba	Henryk Szymocha	
1955	Warsaw	Zygmunt Kaczmarczyk	Emanuel Koczyba	Leon Osadnik	
1956	Zakopane	Emanuel Koczyba	Henryk Szymocha	Bogusław Hnatyszyn	
1957	Warsaw	Zygmunt Kaczmarczyk	Henryk Hanzel	Bogusław Hnatyszyn	
1958	Warsaw	Zygmunt Kaczmarczyk	Henryk Hanzel	Bogusław Hnatyszyn	
1959	Katowice	Henryk Hanzel	Franciszek Spitol	Janusz Czakon	
1960	Bydgoszcz	Henryk Hanzel	Franciszek Spitol	Jan Erlich	
1961	Katowice	Franciszek Spitol	Jan Erlich	Jerzy Zawadzki	
1962	Warsaw	Franciszek Spitol	Jan Erlich	Jerzy Zawadzki	
1963	Warsaw	Franciszek Spitol	Zdzisław Pieńkowski	Leszek Wojnicki	
1964	Warsaw	Franciszek Spitol	Jerzy Zawadzki	Zdzisław Pieńkowski	
1965	Warsaw	Franciszek Spitol	Zdzisław Pieńkowski	Jerzy Zawadzki	
1966	Łódź	Zdzisław Pieńkowski	Franciszek Spitol	Jerzy Zawadzki	
1967	Łódź	Piotr Roszko	Zdzisław Pieńkowski	Piotr Szczypa	
1968	Łódź	Zdzisław Pieńkowski	Piotr Roszko	Janusz Czakon	
1969	Warsaw	Piotr Roszko	Zdzisław Pieńkowski	Janusz Czakon	
1970	Łódź	Zdzisław Pieńkowski	Piotr Roszko	Zbigniew Steinke	
1971	Łódź	Mieczysław Szmuchert	Janusz Czakon	Jacek Tascher	
1972	Katowice	Ludwik Jankowski	Wiesław Wołyszyński	Jacek Tascher	
1973	Łódź	Jacek Tascher	A. Kempiński	Marek Chrolenko	
1974	Łódź	Jacek Żylski	Ludwik Jankowski	Jacek Tascher	
1975	Gdańsk	Jacek Tascher	Ludwik Jankowski	Grzegorz Głowania	
1976	Warsaw	Grzegorz Głowania	Ludwik Jankowski	Jacek Żylski	
1977	Janowiec	Grzegorz Głowania	Jacek Żylski	Jacek Tascher	
1978	Warsaw	Grzegorz Głowania	Ludwik Jankowski	M. Kubik	
1979	Łódź	Ludwik Jankowski	Grzegorz Głowania	Jacek Żylski	
1980	Gdańsk	Grzegorz Głowania	Ludwik Jankowski	Jacek Żylski	
1981	Gdańsk	Grzegorz Filipowski	Grzegorz Głowania	Grzegorz Karnia	
1982	Łódź	Grzegorz Filipowski	Grzegorz Głowania	Zbigniew Głowania	
1983	Oświęcim	Grzegorz Filipowski	Grzegorz Głowania	Zbigniew Głowania	
1984	Łódź	Grzegorz Filipowski	Wojciech Gwinner	Andrzej Strzelec	
1985	Łódź	Grzegorz Filipowski	Wojciech Gwinner	Przemysław Noworyta	
1986	Kraków	Grzegorz Filipowski	Przemysław Noworyta	Jacek Brzosko	
1987	Oświęcim	Przemysław Noworyta	Andrzej Strzelec	Krzysztof Dudzik	
1988	Gdańsk	Przemysław Noworyta	Andrzej Strzelec	Adam Lechna	
1989	Łódź	Przemysław Noworyta	Jakub Domagałę	Marek Sząszor	
1990	Oświęcim	Marek Sząszor	Ryszarda Kiewrela	Jakub Domagałę	
1991	Łódź	Tomasz Dombkowski	Ryszarda Kiewrela	Marek Sząszor	
1992	Tarnów	Robert Grzegorczyk	Tomasz Dombkowski	Marek Sząszor	
1993	Tarnów	Marek Sząszor	Robert Grzegorczyk	Ryszarda Kiewrela	
1994	Warsaw	Zbigniew Komorowski	Robert Grzegorczyk	Marek Sząszor	
1995	Gdańsk	Zbigniew Komorowski	Robert Grzegorczyk	Adam Załęgowski	
1996	Oświęcim	Robert Grzegorczyk	Zbigniew Komorowski	Marek Sząszor	
1997	Warsaw	Robert Grzegorczyk	Marek Sząszor	Marek Sączewski	
1998	Warsaw	Robert Grzegorczyk	Adam Załęgowski	Marek Sząszor	
1999	Sosnowiec	Robert Grzegorczyk	Marek Sząszor	No other competitors	
2000	Warsaw	Robert Grzegorczyk	Bartosz Domański	No other competitors	
2001	Warsaw	Robert Grzegorczyk	Bartosz Domański	Patryk Szałaśny	
2002	Warsaw	Bartosz Domański	Krzysztof Komosa	Patryk Szałaśny	
2003	Sosnowiec	Bartosz Domański	Krzysztof Komosa	No other competitors	
2004	Łódź	Maciej Kuś	Krzysztof Komosa	Łukasz Daros	
2005	Opole	Maciej Kuś	Przemysław Domański	Krzysztof Komosa	
2006	Krynica-Zdrój	Przemysław Domański	Bartosz Domański	Maciej Lewandowski	
2007	Oświęcim	Przemysław Domański	Mateusz Chruściński	Konstantin Tupikow	
2008	Oświęcim	Konstantin Tupikov	Przemysław Domański	Maciej Cieplucha	
2009	(Czech Republic) Třinec	Przemysław Domański	Konstantin Tupikov	Kamil Białas	
2010	Cieszyn	Maciej Cieplucha	Kamil Białas	Sebastian Iwasaki	
2011	(Slovakia) Žilina	Przemysław Domański	Maciej Cieplucha	Patrick Myzyk	
2012	(Czech Republic) Ostrava	Maciej Cieplucha	Sebastian Iwasaki	Kamil Białas	
2013	Cieszyn	Patrick Myzyk	Kamil Białas	Kamil Dymowski	
2014	(Slovakia) Bratislava	Maciej Cieplucha	Krzysztof Gała	Kamil Dymowski	
2015	(Hungary) Budapest	Patrick Myzyk	Krzysztof Gała	Łukasz Kędzierski	
2016	(Czech Republic) Třinec	Igor Reznichenko	Patrick Myzyk	Krzysztof Gała	
2017	Katowice	Krzysztof Gała	Igor Reznichenko	Ryszard Gurtler	
2018	(Slovakia) Košice	Igor Reznichenko	Krzysztof Gała	Olgierd Febbi	
2019	(Hungary) Budapest	Igor Reznichenko	Krzysztof Gała	Olgierd Febbi	
2020	(Czech Republic) Ostrava	Mikhail Mogilen	Łukasz Kędzierski	Miłosz Witkowski	
2021	Cieszyn	Kornel Witkowski	Łukasz Kędzierski	Miłosz Witkowski	
2022	(Slovakia) Spišská Nová Ves	Vladimir Samoilov	Kornel Witkowski	Miłosz Witkowski	
2023	(Hungary) Budapest	Vladimir Samoilov	Miłosz Witkowski	Kornel Witkowski	
2024	(Czech Republic) Turnov	Vladimir Samoilov	Matvii Yefymenko	Jakub Lofek	
2025	Cieszyn	Vladimir Samoilov	Kornel Witkowski	Jakub Lofek	
2026	(Slovakia) Prešov	Vladimir Samoilov	Matvii Yefymenko	Jakub Lofek	

=== Women's singles ===
Senior women's event medalists
Year	Location	Gold	Silver	Bronze	Ref.
1930	Lviv	Barbara Chachlewska	Marta Rudnicka	Helena Kulbicka	
1931	Katowice	Barbara Śniadecka	Ms. Cukiertówna	No other competitors	
1932	Zakopane	Edyta Popowicz	Barbara Śniadecka	Ms. Cukiertówna	
1933	Katowice	Edyta Popowicz	Elza Czorówna	Irena Fialówna	
1934	Warsaw	Edyta Popowicz	Anna Bzdokówna	Elza Czorówna	
1935	Katowice	Edyta Popowicz	Jadwiga Preiss	Joanna Ziaja	
1936	No competition held				
1937	Katowice	Erna Schreibert	Joanna Ziaja	Jadwiga Preiss	
1938	Zakopane	Erna Schreibert	Joanna Ziaja	Elza Czorówna	
1939–46	No competitions due to World War II				
1947	Warsaw	Jadwiga Dąbrowska	Janina Łeszczyna-Jajszczok	Anna Bursche	
1948	No competition held				
1949	Karpacz	Anna Bursche-Lindner	Joanna Ziaja	No other competitors	
1950	Zakopane	Anna Bursche-Lindner	Joanna Ziaja	Janina Łeszczyna-Jajszczok	
1951	Zakopane	Anna Bursche-Lindner	Hanna Dąbrowska	Joanna Ziaja	
1952	Zakopane	Anna Bursche-Lindner	Hanna Dąbrowska	Janina Łeszczyna-Jajszczok	
1953	Katowice	Anna Bursche-Lindner	Hanna Dąbrowska	Barbara Jankowska	
1954	Warsaw	Barbara Jankowska	Krystyna Macura	Janina Wawrzyniak	
1955	Warsaw	Barbara Jankowska	Janina Wawrzyniak	Ms. Machinek	
1956	Zakopane	Barbara Jankowska	Ms. Machinek	Ms. Zdankiewicz	
1957	Warsaw	Barbara Jankowska	Krystyna Wąsik	Janina Wawrzyniak	
1958	Warsaw	Barbara Jankowska	Krystyna Wąsik	Barbara Langer	
1959	Katowice	Krystyna Wąsik	Krystyna Macura	Barbara Langer	
1960	Bydgoszcz	Barbara Jankowska	Krystyna Wąsik	Krystyna Macura	
1961	Katowice	Krystyna Wąsik	Krystyna Skorupa	No other competitors	
1962	Warsaw	Elżbieta Kościk-Koczyba	Krystyna Skorupa	Hanna Haber	
1963	Warsaw	Elżbieta Kościk-Koczyba	Hanna Haber	Krystyna Jakubowska	
1964	Warsaw	Elżbieta Kościk-Koczyba	Halina Bartlakowska	Aleksandra Robakowska	
1965	Warsaw	Elżbieta Kościk-Koczyba	Halina Bartlakowska	Hanna Haber	
1966	Łódź	Elżbieta Kościk-Koczyba	Urszula Zielińska	Halina Bartlakowska	
1967	Łódź	Elżbieta Kościk-Koczyba	Barbara Warmińska	Urszula Zielińska	
1968	Łódź	Elżbieta Kościk-Koczyba	Barbara Warmińska	Halina Bartlakowska	
1969	Warsaw	Mirosława Nowak	Urszula Zielińska	Barbara Warmińska	
1970	Łódź	Mirosława Nowak	Barbara Warmińska	Urszula Zielińska	
1971	Łódź	Urszula Zielińska	Mirosława Nowak	Barbara Warmińska	
1972	Katowice	Urszula Zielińska	Halina Szczyrba	Elżbieta Łuczyńska	
1973	Łódź	Urszula Zielińska	Halina Szczyrba	Grażyna Dudek	
1974	Łódź	Grażyna Dudek	Barbara Warmińska	Halina Szczyrba	
1975	Gdańsk	Grażyna Dudek	Maria Kotyrba	Anna Garbacz	
1976	Warsaw	Grażyna Dudek	Maria Kotyrba	Anna Garbacz	
1977	Janowiec	Grażyna Dudek	Anna Garbacz	Maria Kotyrba	
1978	Warsaw	Grażyna Dudek	Helena Chwila	Urszula Mucha	
1979	Łódź	Helena Chwila	Anna Garbacz	Grażyna Dudek	
1980	Gdańsk	Helena Chwila	Urszula Mucha	Monika Kowalska	
1981	Gdańsk	Helena Chwila	Beata Nechrzter	Beata Bober	
1982	Łódź	Barbara Kazimierczak	Helena Chwila	Renata Linek	
1983	Oświęcim	Mirela Gawłowska	Helena Chwila	Barbara Każmierczak	
1984	Łódź	Helena Chwila	Mirela Gawłowska	Barbara Każmierczak	
1985	Łódź	Mirela Gawłowska	Helena Chwila	Barbara Każmierczak	
1986	Kraków	Mirela Gawłowska	Karina Steitzer	Katarzyne Grzelecka	
1987	Oświęcim	Mirela Gawłowska	Karina Steitzer & Beata Mol (tie)	No bronze medal awarded	
1988	Gdańsk	Mirela Gawłowska	Karina Steitzer	Małgorzate Górska	
1989	Łódź	Mirela Gawłowska	Agate Szmajchal	Małgorzate Górska	
1990	Oświęcim	Beata Zielińska	Beata Burcoń	Olimpie Pabian	
1991	Łódź	Zuzanna Szwed	Beata Zielińska	Dorota Zagórska	
1992	Tarnów	Zuzanna Szwed	Anna Rechnio	Magdalena Kostrzewińska	
1993	Tarnów	Zuzanna Szwed	Anna Rechnio	Magdalena Kostrzewińska	
1994	Warsaw	Anna Rechnio	Zuzanna Szwed	Magdalena Górska	
1995	Gdańsk	Zuzanna Szwed	Anna Rechnio	Katarzyna Walczak	
1996	Oświęcim	Zuzanna Szwed	Anna Rechnio	Sabina Wojtala	
1997	Warsaw	Anna Rechnio	Zuzanna Szwed	Sabina Wojtala	
1998	Warsaw	Anna Rechnio	Sabina Wojtala	Zuzanna Szwed	
1999	Sosnowiec	Sabina Wojtala	Anna Rechnio	Rita Chałubińska	
2000	Warsaw	Sabina Wojtala	Anna Rechnio	Katarzyna Zembroń	
2001	Warsaw	Sabina Wojtala	Iwona Szczepka	No other competitors	
2002	Warsaw	Sabina Wojtala	Maria Mordarska	Aleksandra Żelichowska	
2003	Sosnowiec	Sabina Wojtala	Anna Jurkiewicz	Oktawia Ścibior	
2004	Łódź	Anna Zawada	Maria Mordarska	Aleksandra Żelichowska	
2005	Opole	Ilona Senderek	Magdalena Leski	Maria Mordarska	
2006	Krynica-Zdrój	Sabina Wojtala	Ilona Senderek	Adriana Grabowska	
2007	Oświęcim	Anna Jurkiewicz	Katarzyna Dusik	Ilona Senderek	
2008	Oświęcim	Anna Jurkiewicz	Aneta Michałek	Laura Czarnotta	
2009	(Czech Republic) Třinec	Anna Jurkiewicz	Alexandria Riordan	No other competitors	
2010	Cieszyn	Aneta Michałek	Anna Jurkiewicz	Olga Szelc	
2011	(Slovakia) Žilina	Anna Jurkiewicz	Aneta Michałek	Krystyna Klimczak	
2012	(Czech Republic) Ostrava	Alexandra Kamieniecki	Agata Kryger	Krystyna Klimczak	
2013	Cieszyn	Agata Kryger	Aneta Michałek	Marta Olczak	
2014	(Slovakia) Bratislava	Agata Kryger	Alexandra Kamieniecki	Marcelina Lech	
2015	(Hungary) Budapest	Agata Kryger	Agnieszka Rejment	Anna Siedlecka	
2016	(Czech Republic) Třinec	Aleksandra Rudolf	Agnieszka Rejment	Colette Kaminski	
2017	Katowice	Elżbieta Gabryszak	Agnieszka Rejment	Colette Kaminski	
2018	(Slovakia) Košice	Elżbieta Gabryszak	Oliwia Rzepiel	Colette Kaminski	
2019	(Hungary) Budapest	Ekaterina Kurakova	Elżbieta Gabryszak	Magdalena Zawadzka	
2020	(Czech Republic) Ostrava	Ekaterina Kurakova	Oliwia Rzepiel	Elżbieta Gabryszak	
2021	Cieszyn	Ekaterina Kurakova	Elżbieta Gabryszak	Natalia Lerka	
2022	(Slovakia) Spišská Nová Ves	Ekaterina Kurakova	Elżbieta Gabryszak	Agnieszka Rejment	
2023	(Hungary) Budapest	Ekaterina Kurakova	Karolina Białas	Zofia Grzegorzewska	
2024	(Czech Republic) Turnov	Ekaterina Kurakova	Laura Szczesna	Karolina Białas	
2025	Cieszyn	Ekaterina Kurakova	Laura Szczesna	Karolina Białas	
2026	(Slovakia) Prešov	Ekaterina Kurakova	Laura Szczesna	Weronika Ferlin	

=== Pairs ===
Tadeusz Kowalski, nine-time champion in pair skating with his partner Zofia Bilorówna, served as an officer of the Polish Armed Forces during the Soviet invasion of Poland at the start of World War II. He was captured as a prisoner of war and later executed at Kharkiv during the Katyn massacre in 1940.

Senior pairs' event medalists
Year	Location	Gold	Silver	Bronze	Ref.
1922	Warsaw	Olga Przeździemirska; Henryk Krukowicz-Przedrzymirski	Józefina Kowalewska; Zygmunt Ziemski	No other competitors	
1923	Lviv	Olga Przeździemirska; Henryk Krukowicz-Przedrzymirski	Zofia Bilorówna; Tadeusz Kowalski	Lhotska Mieczysława; Józef Łapiński	
1924	Warsaw	Olga Przeździemirska; Henryk Krukowicz-Przedrzymirski	Irena Szwejcer; Narcyz Pełczyński	No other competitors	
1925–26	No competitions held				
1927	Warsaw	Zofia Bilorówna; Tadeusz Kowalski	Irena Szwejcer; Narcyz Pełczyński	Barbara Śniadecka; Cpt. Klimczakz	
1928	Lviv	Zofia Bilorówna; Tadeusz Kowalski	No other competitors		
1929	Lviv	Zofia Bilorówna; Tadeusz Kowalski	Marta Rudnicka; Alfred Theuer	No other competitors	
1930	Lviv	Zofia Bilorówna; Tadeusz Kowalski	Marta Rudnicka; Alfred Theuer	Barbara Chachlewska; Narcyz Pełczyński	
1931	Katowice	Zofia Bilorówna; Tadeusz Kowalski	Marta Rudnicka; Alfred Theuer	Barbara Śniadecka; Mr. Padowski	
1932	Zakopane	Zofia Bilorówna; Tadeusz Kowalski	Marta Rudnicka; Alfred Theuer	Wanda Żmudzińscy; Mr. Żmudzińscy	
1933	Cieszyn	Zofia Bilorówna; Tadeusz Kowalski	Marta Rudnicka; Alfred Theuer	Ms. Kislerówna; Mr. Łowczyński	
1934	Warsaw	Zofia Bilorówna; Tadeusz Kowalski	Barbara Chachlewska; Alfred Theuer	Stefania Kalusz; Erwin Kalusz	
1935	Katowice	Zofia Bilorówna; Tadeusz Kowalski	Barbara Chachlewska; Alfred Theuer	Stefania Kalusz; Erwin Kalusz	
1936	No competition held				
1937	Katowice	Stefania Kalusz; Erwin Kalusz	Barbara Chachlewska; Alfred Theuer	No other competitors	
1938	Zakopane	Stefania Kalusz; Erwin Kalusz	Barbara Chachlewska; Alfred Theuer	No other competitors	
1939–46	No competitions due to World War II				
1947	Warsaw	Barbara Łaniewska; Bogdan Owczarek	Janina Łeszczyna-Jajszczok; Józef Standzina	No other competitors	
1948	No competition held				
1949	Karpacz	Joanna Ziają; Paweł Wrocławski	No other competitors		
1950	Zakopane	Joanna Ziają; Paweł Wrocławski	Janina Łeszczyna-Jajszczok; Leon Osadnik	No other competitors	
1951	Katowice	Janina Łeszczyna-Jajszczok; Karol Sojka	Ms. Studencka; Leon Osadnik	Joanna Ziaja; Paweł Wrocławski	
1952	Zakopane	Janina Łeszczyna-Jajszczok; Karol Sojka	Ms. Macurzanka; Józef Standzina	Ms. Czakonowa; Mr. Piotrowski	
1953	Katowice	Janina Łeszczyna-Jajszczok; Karol Sojka	Ms. Machinek; Janusz Czakon	Ms. Rodzeństwo; Mr. Konieczny	
1954	Warsaw	Anna Bursche-Lindnerowa; Leon Osadnik	Ms. Machinek; Janusz Czakon	No other competitors	
1955	Warsaw	Anna Bursche-Lindnerowa; Leon Osadnik	Barbara Langer; Janusz Czakon	Ms. Bargiot; Mr. Ledwig	
1956	Zakopane	Anna Bursche-Lindnerowa; Leon Osadnik	Irena Konieczny; Klaudiusz Konieczny	Krystyna Wąsik; Emanuel Koczyba	
1957	Warsaw	Barbara Jankowska; Zygmunt Kaczmarczyk	No other competitors		
1958	Warsaw	Barbara Jankowska; Zygmunt Kaczmarczyk	Irena Konieczny; Klaudiusz Konieczny	No other competitors	
1959	Katowice	Barbara Jankowska; Zygmunt Kaczmarczyk	No other competitors		
1960	Bydgoszcz	Krystyna Wąsik; Zygmunt Kaczmarczyk	No other competitors		
1961	Katowice	Krystyna Wąsik; Zygmunt Kaczmarczyk	No other competitors		
1962–63	No pairs competitors				
1964	Warsaw	Grazyna Niwińska; Zbigniew Steinke	Genowefa Malczak; Piotr Jankowski	Halina Pawlina; Adam Brodecki	
1965	Warsaw	Janina Poremska; Piotr Sczypa	Grażyna Osmańska; Ryszard Górecki	Halina Pawlina; Adam Brodecki	
1966	Łódź	Janina Poremska; Piotr Sczypa	Halina Pawlina; Adam Brodecki	Grażyna Osmańska; Ryszard Górecki	
1967	Łódź	Janina Poremska; Piotr Sczypa	Grażyna Osmańska; Ryszard Górecki	Halina Pawlina; Adam Brodecki	
1968	Łódź	Janina Poremska; Piotr Sczypa	Grażyna Osmańska; Adam Brodecki	Aleksandra Chodorołka; Jacek Grzegrzółka	
1969	Warsaw	Janina Poremska; Piotr Sczypa	Grażyna Osmańska; Adam Brodecki	Aleksandra Chodorołka; Jacek Grzegrzółka	
1970	Łódź	Janina Poremska; Piotr Sczypa	Grażyna Osmańska; Adam Brodecki	Aleksandra Chodorołka; Jacek Grzegrzółka	
1971	Łódź	Grażyna Osmańska-Kostrzewińska; Adam Brodecki	Teresa Skrzek; Piotr Sczypa	No other competitors	
1972	Katowice	Grażyna Osmańska-Kostrzewińska; Adam Brodecki	Teresa Skrzek; Piotr Sczypa	Ewa Prutek; Marian Sztok	
1973	Łódź	Teresa Skrzek; Piotr Sczypa	B. Michalska; Marian Sztok	J. Wesolowska; Mieczysław Szmuchert	
1974	Łódź	Teresa Skrzek; Piotr Sczypa	Grażyna Osmańska-Kostrzewińska; Adam Brodecki	Teresa Wrona; Ludwik Żabiński	
1975	Gdańsk	Teresa Skrzek; Piotr Sczypa	Grażyna Osmańska-Kostrzewińska; Adam Brodecki	Elżbieta Łuczyńska; Marek Chrolenko	
1976	Warsaw	Teresa Wrona; Ludwik Żabiński	Elżbieta Łuczyńska; Marek Chrolenko	Teresa Skrzek; Piotr Sczypa	
1977	Janowiec	Teresa Wrona; Piotr Sczypa	Elżbieta Łuczyńska; Marek Chrolenko	Ewa Czyż; Tadeusz Jankowski	
1978	Warsaw	Elżbieta Łuczyńska; Marek Chrolenko	Maria Jeżak; Lech Matuszewski	Ewa Czyż; Tadeusz Jankowski	
1979	Łódź	Maria Jeżak; Lech Matuszewski	Ewa Czyż; Tadeusz Jankowski	Barbara Kaźmierczak; Ryszard Makowski	
1980	Gdańsk	Maria Jeżak; Lech Matuszewski	Ewa Czyż; Tadeusz Jankowski	Barbara Kaźmierczak; Ryszard Makowski	
1981	Gdańsk	Maria Jeżak; Lech Matuszewski	Helena Chwila; Jacek Żylski	No other competitors	
1982	Łódź	Ewa Czyż; Tadeusz Jankowski; (Note: Ewa Czyż and Tadeusz Jankowski were not awarded the title of Polish champions, because the minimum required number of entrants in the competition was not met.)	No other competitors		
1983–85	No pairs competitors				
1986	Kraków	Iwona Oliwa; Piotr Szczerbowski	No other competitors		
1987	Oświęcim	Anna Wikłacz; Piotr Szczerbowski; (Note: Anna Wikłacz and Piotr Szczerbowski were not awarded the title of Polish champions, because the minimum required number of entrants in the competition was not met.)	No other competitors		
1988	Gdańsk	Anna Wikłacz; Piotr Szczerbowski	No other competitors		
1989	Łódź	Anna Górecka; Arkadiusz Górecki; (Note: Although Anna Górecka and Arkadiusz Górecki finished in first place, they were not awarded the title of Polish champions.)	Karina Steitzer; Piotra Szczerbowskiego	No other competitors	
1990	Oświęcim	Katarzyna Głowacka; Krzysztof Korcarz; (Note: Although Katarzyna Głowacka and Krzysztof Korcarz finished in first place, they were not awarded the title of Polish champions.)	No other competitors		
1991	Łódź	Katarzyna Głowacka; Krzysztof Korcarz	Beata Zielińska; Mariusz Siudek	No other competitors	
1992	Tarnów	Beata Zielińska; Mariusz Siudek; (Note: Beata Zielińska and Mariusz Siudek were not awarded the title of Polish champions, because the minimum required number of entrants in the competition was not met.)	Agnieszka Pihut; Marek Osowski	No other competitors	
1993	Tarnów	Beata Zielińska; Mariusz Siudek	Magdalena Kolniak; Janusz Komendera	No other competitors	
1994	Warsaw	Marta Głuchowska; Mariusz Siudek	Dorota Zagórska; Janusz Komendera	No other competitors	
1995	Gdańsk	Dorota Zagórska; Mariusz Siudek	Magdalena Sroczyńska; Sławomir Borowiecki	Sabina Wojtala; Janusz Komendera	
1996	Oświęcim	Dorota Zagórska; Mariusz Siudek	Magdalena Sroczyńska; Sławomir Borowiecki	No other competitors	
1997	Warsaw	Dorota Zagórska; Mariusz Siudek	No other competitors		
1998	Warsaw	Dorota Zagórska; Mariusz Siudek	Aneta Kowalska; Łukasz Różycki	No other competitors	
1999	Sosnowiec	Dorota Zagórska; Mariusz Siudek	No other competitors		
2000	Warsaw	Dorota Zagórska; Mariusz Siudek	No other competitors		
2001	Warsaw	No pairs competitors			
2002	Warsaw	Dorota Zagórska; Mariusz Siudek	Aneta Kowalska; Artur Szeliski	No other competitors	
2003	Sosnowiec	Dorota Zagórska; Mariusz Siudek	No other competitors		
2004	Łódź	Dorota Zagórska; Mariusz Siudek	No other competitors		
2005	Opole	Dominika Piątkowska; Dmitri Khromin	No other competitors		
2006	Krynica-Zdrój	Dominika Piątkowska; Dmitri Khromin	No other competitors		
2007	Oświęcim	Dominika Piątkowska; Dmitri Khromin	Krystyna Klimczak; Janusz Karweta; (Note: Krystyna Klimczak and Janusz Karweta were named the 2008 Polish champions, because the first-place finishers, Stacey Kemp and David King, were guest skaters from Great Britain.)	No other competitors	
2008	Oświęcim	(United Kingdom); Stacey Kemp; David King; (Great Britain)	Krystyna Klimczak; Janusz Karweta	No other competitors	
2009	(Czech Republic) Třinec	Joanna Sulej; Mateusz Chruściński	Krystyna Klimczak; Janusz Karweta	Elizabeth Harb; Patryk Szałaśny	
2010	Cieszyn	Joanna Sulej; Mateusz Chruściński	Elizabeth Harb; Patryk Szałaśny	Magdalena Klatka; Radosław Chruściński	
2011	(Slovakia) Žilina	Magdalena Klatka; Radosław Chruściński	Aleksandra Malinkiewicz; Sebastian Lofek	Anna Siedlecka; Jakub Tyc	
2012	(Czech Republic) Ostrava	Magdalena Klatka; Radosław Chruściński	Aleksandra Malinkiewicz; Sebastian Lofek	Magdalena Jaskółka; Piotr Snopek	
2013	Cieszyn	Marcelina Lech; Jakub Tyc	Marya Kozina; Janusz Karweta	No other competitors	
2014	(Slovakia) Bratislava	Magdalena Klatka; Radosław Chruściński	No other competitors		
2015–21	No pairs competitors				
2022	(Slovakia) Spišská Nová Ves	Anna Hernik; Michał Woźniak	No other competitors		
2023	(Hungary) Budapest	No pairs competitors			
2024	(Czech Republic) Turnov	Ioulia Chtchetinina; Michał Woźniak	No other competitors		
2025	Cieszyn	Ioulia Chtchetinina; Michał Woźniak	No other competitors		
2026	(Slovakia) Prešov	Ioulia Chtchetinina; Michał Woźniak	No other competitors		

=== Ice dance ===
Senior ice dance event medalists
Year	Location	Gold	Silver	Bronze	Ref.
1956	Zakopane	Anna Bursche-Lindnerowa; Leon Osadnik	Ms. Coghen; Mr. Ochnik	Ms. Pelka; Karol Sojka	
1957	Warsaw	Anna Bursche-Lindnerowa; Leon Osadnik	Hanna Dąbrowska; Zygmunt Kaczmarczyk	Ellen Adams; Andrzej Stryjecki	
1958	Warsaw	Hanna Dąbrowska; Zygmunt Kaczmarczyk	Ms. Rummel; Andrzej Stryjecki	No other competitors	
1959	Katowice	Elżbieta Zdankiewicz; Emanuel Koczyba	No other competitors		
1960	Bydgoszcz	Elżbieta Zdankiewicz; Emanuel Koczyba	Anita Wasilewska; Andrzej Stryjecki	Magda Erlich; Jan Erlich	
1961	Katowice	Elżbieta Zdankiewicz; Emanuel Koczyba	Magda Erlich; Jan Erlich	No other competitors	
1962	Warsaw	Elżbieta Zdankiewicz; Emanuel Koczyba	No other competitors		
1963	Warsaw	Magda Erlich; Jan Erlich	No other competitors		
1964	Warsaw	Genowefa Malczak; Piotr Jankowski	No other competitors		
1965	Warsaw	Anna Utrysko; Janusz Konopka	Genowefa Malczak; Piotr Jankowski	No other competitors	
1966	Łódź	Genowefa Malczak; Piotr Jankowski	Anna Lantan; Janusz Lantan	No other competitors	
1967	Łódź	Genowefa Malczak; Piotr Jankowski	Teresa Weyna; Piotr Bojańczyk	Ms. L. Balcerzak; Mr. Zb. Binkowski	
1968	Łódź	Teresa Weyna; Piotr Bojańczyk	Ms. L. Balcerzak; Mr. Zb. Binkowski	Ewa Kołodziej; Tadeusz Góra	
1969	Warsaw	Teresa Weyna; Piotr Bojańczyk	Ewa Kołodziej; Tadeusz Góra	Halina Gordon; Wojciech Bańkowski	
1970	Łódź	Teresa Weyna; Piotr Bojańczyk	Ewa Kołodziej; Tadeusz Góra	Halina Gordon; Wojciech Bańkowski	
1971	Łódź	Teresa Weyna; Piotr Bojańczyk	Ewa Kołodziej; Tadeusz Góra	Halina Gordon; Wojciech Bańkowski	
1972	Katowice	Teresa Weyna; Piotr Bojańczyk	Ewa Kołodziej; Tadeusz Góra	Teresa Budaszewska; Witold Bieńiek	
1973	Łódź	Teresa Weyna; Piotr Bojańczyk	Ewa Kołodziej; Tadeusz Góra	Halina Gordon; Wojciech Bańkowski	
1974	Łódź	Teresa Weyna; Piotr Bojańczyk	Ewa Kołodziej; Tadeusz Góra	Teresa Budaszewska; Witold Bieńiek	
1975	Gdańsk	Teresa Weyna; Piotr Bojańczyk	Ewa Kołodziej; Tadeusz Góra	Halina Gordon; Wojciech Bańkowski	
1976	Warsaw	Teresa Weyna; Piotr Bojańczyk	Ewa Kołodziej; Tadeusz Góra	Elżbieta Węgrzyk; Andrzej Alberciak	
1977	Janowiec	Halina Gordon-Półtorak; Tadeusz Góra	Elżbieta Węgrzyk; Andrzej Alberciak	Iwona Grabowska; Kazimierz Ruszkowski	
1978	Warsaw	Jolanta Wesołowska; Andrzej Alberciak	Halina Gordon-Półtorak; Jacek Tascher	Iwona Grabowska; Kazimierz Ruszkowski	
1979	Łódź	Jolanta Wesołowska; Andrzej Alberciak	Halina Gordon-Półtorak; Jacek Tascher	Iwona Grabowska; Kazimierz Ruszkowski	
1980	Gdańsk	Jolanta Wesołowska; Andrzej Alberciak	Alina Mierzejewska; Mirosław Plutowski	Dorota Peła; Tomasz Chmielewski	
1981	Gdańsk	Iwona Bielas; Jacek Jasiaczek	Jolanta Wesołowska; Andrzej Alberczak	Bożena Wierzchowska; Robert Kazanowski	
1982	Łódź	Jolanta Wesołowska; Andrzej Alberciak	Iwona Bielas; Jacek Jasiaczek	Agnieszka Bieda; Jacek Tascher	
1983	Oświęcim	Bożena Wierzchowska; Robert Kazanowski	Dorota Pełka; Jacek Jasiaczek	Monika Kowalska; Krzysztof Maryńczak	
1984	Łódź	Bożena Wierzchowska; Robert Kazanowski	Dorota Pełka; Krzysztof Maryńczak	Beata Kawełczyk; Tomasz Politański	
1985	Łódź	Honorata Górna; Andrzej Dostatni	Beata Kawełczyk; Tomasz Politański	Dorota Pełka; Krzysztof Maryńczak	
1986	Kraków	Jolanta Zagórska; Andrzej Sząszor	Beata Kawełczyk; Tomasz Politański	No other competitors	
1987	Oświęcim	Honorata Górna; Andrzej Dostatni	Beata Kawełczyk; Tomasz Politański	Małgorzata Grajcar; Jarosław Loka	
1988	Gdańsk	Honorata Górna; Andrzej Dostatni	Barbara Lewidska; Andrzej Strzelec	Małgorzata Grajcar; Jarosław Loka	
1989	Łódź	Małgorzata Grajcar; Andrzej Dostatni	Małgorzate Burczyńska; Jarosław Loka	Katarzyne Długoszewska; Macieja Szawarejko	
1990	Oświęcim	Małgorzata Grajcar; Andrzej Dostatni	Katarzyne Długoszewska; Andrzej Sząszor	Agnieszke Walczak; Radosława Machała	
1991	Łódź	Małgorzata Grajcar; Andrzej Dostatni; (Note: Małgorzata Grajcar and Andrzej Dostatni were not awarded the title of Polish champions, because the minimum required number of entrants in the competition was not met.)	No other competitors		
1992	Tarnów	Agnieszka Domańska; Marcin Głowacki; (Note: Agnieszka Domańska and Marcin Głowacki were not awarded the title of Polish champions, because the minimum required number of entrants in the competition was not met.)	Agnieszka Kaczmarek; Maciej Bojanowski	No other competitors	
1993	Tarnów	Agnieszka Domańska; Marcin Głowacki	Agnieszka Haaza; Marcin Filocha	Agnieszka Błażowska; Tadeusza Jekiela	
1994	Warsaw	Agnieszka Domańska; Marcin Głowacki	Agnieszka Haaza; Marcin Filocha	No other competitors	
1995	Gdańsk	Sylwia Nowak; Sebastian Kolasiński	Agnieszka Domańska; Marcin Głowacki	Agata Balewicz; Remigiusz Hess	
1996	Oświęcim	Sylwia Nowak; Sebastian Kolasiński	Iwona Filipowicz; Michał Szumski	Agnieszka Haaza; M. Woźniak	
1997	Warsaw	Sylwia Nowak; Sebastian Kolasiński	Iwona Filipowicz; Michał Szumski	Jolanta Bury; Łukasz Zalewski	
1998	Warsaw	Sylwia Nowak; Sebastian Kolasiński	Agata Błażowska; Marcin Kozubek	Jolanta Bury; Łukasz Zalewski	
1999	Sosnowiec	Agata Błażowska; Marcin Kozubek	Julie Keeble; Łukasz Zalewski	No other competitors	
2000	Warsaw	Sylwia Nowak; Sebastian Kolasiński	Agata Błażowska; Marcin Kozubek	Aleksandra Kauc; Filip Bernadowski	
2001	Warsaw	Sylwia Nowak; Sebastian Kolasiński	Agata Błażowska; Marcin Kozubek	Aleksandra Kauc; Filip Bernadowski	
2002	Warsaw	Sylwia Nowak; Sebastian Kolasiński	Agnieszka Dulej; Sławomir Janicki	No other competitors	
2003	Sosnowiec	Sylwia Nowak; Sebastian Kolasiński	Agnieszka Dulej; Sławomir Janicki	No other competitors	
2004	Łódź	Aleksandra Kauc; Michał Zych	Agnieszka Dulej; Sławomir Janicki	Maria Bińczyk; Michał Tomaszewski	
2005	Opole	Aleksandra Kauc; Michał Zych	No other competitors		
2006	Krynica-Zdrój	Aleksandra Kauc; Michał Zych	No other competitors		
2007	Warsaw	Joanna Budner; Jan Mościcki	No other competitors		
2008	Oświęcim	Joanna Budner; Jan Mościcki	No other competitors		
2009	(Czech Republic) Třinec	Joanna Budner; Jan Mościcki	No other competitors		
2010	Cieszyn	Anastasia Vykhodtseva; Jan Mościcki	No other competitors		
2011	(Slovakia) Žilina	Alexandra Zvorigina; Maciej Bernadowski	Justyna Plutowska; Dawid Pietrzyński	No other competitors	
2012	(Czech Republic) Ostrava	Alexandra Zvorigina; Maciej Bernadowski	Natalia Kaliszek; Michał Kaliszek	No other competitors	
2013	Cieszyn	Alexandra Zvorigina; Maciej Bernadowski	Justyna Plutowska; Peter Gerber	Natalia Kaliszek; Michał Kaliszek	
2014	(Slovakia) Bratislava	Justyna Plutowska; Peter Gerber	No other competitors		
2015	(Hungary) Budapest	Natalia Kaliszek; Maksym Spodyriev	Beatrice Tomczak; Damian Bińkowski	No other competitors	
2016	(Czech Republic) Třinec	Natalia Kaliszek; Maksym Spodyriev	No other competitors		
2017	Katowice	Natalia Kaliszek; Maksym Spodyriev	No other competitors		
2018	(Slovakia) Košice	Natalia Kaliszek; Maksym Spodyriev	Justyna Plutowska; Jérémie Flemin	Anastasia Polibina; Radosław Barszczak	
2019	(Hungary) Budapest	Natalia Kaliszek; Maksym Spodyriev	Justyna Plutowska; Jérémie Flemin	Jenna Hertenstein; Damian Binkowski	
2020	(Czech Republic) Ostrava	Natalia Kaliszek; Maksym Spodyriev	Justyna Plutowska; Jérémie Flemin	Anastasia Polibina; Pavel Golovishnikov	
2021	Cieszyn	Natalia Kaliszek; Maksym Spodyriev	Anastasia Polibina; Pavel Golovishnikov	Jenna Hertenstein; Damian Binkowski	
2022	(Slovakia) Spišská Nová Ves	Natalia Kaliszek; Maksym Spodyriev	Anastasia Polibina; Pavel Golovishnikov	Jenna Hertenstein; Damian Binkowski	
2023	(Hungary) Budapest	Anastasia Polibina; Pavel Golovishnikov	Olivia Oliver; Elliot Graham	Olexandra Borysova; Aaron Freeman	
2024	(Czech Republic) Turnov	Olivia Oliver; Filip Bojanowski	Sofiia Dovhal; Wiktor Kulesza	Anastasia Polibina; Pavel Golovishnikov	
2025	Cieszyn	Sofiia Dovhal; Wiktor Kulesza	Anastasia Polibina; Pavel Golovishnikov	No other competitors	
2026	(Slovakia) Prešov	Sofiia Dovhal; Wiktor Kulesza	Zofia Grzegorzewska; Oleg Muratov	Helena Carhart; Filip Bojanowski	

== Junior medalists ==
=== Men's singles ===
Junior men's event medalists
Year	Location	Gold	Silver	Bronze	Ref.
2009	Cieszyn	Sebastian Iwasaki	Edwin Siwkowski	Kamil Białas	
2010	Opole	Edwin Siwkowski	Kamil Białas	Sebastian Iwasaki	
2011	Oświęcim	Kamil Białas	Edwin Siwkowski	Kamil Dymowski	
2012	Cieszyn	Kamil Dymowski	Krzysztof Gała	Łukasz Pazdro	
2013	Oświęcim	Kamil Dymowski	Krzysztof Gała	Łukasz Kędzierski	
2014	Katowice-Janów	Krzysztof Gała	Ryszard Gurtler	Wiktor Witkowski	
2015	Cieszyn	Krzysztof Gała	Kamil Dymowski	Sebastian Szymłowski	
2016	Gdańsk	Michał Woźniak	Eryk Matysiak	Sebastian Szymłowski	
2017	Krynica-Zdrój	Ryszard Gurtler	Eryk Matysiak	Kornel Witkowski	
2018	Krynica-Zdrój	Eryk Matysiak	Ryszard Gurtler	Michał Woźniak	
2019	Oświęcim	Kornel Witkowski	Miłosz Witkowski	Jakub Lofek	
2020	Krynica-Zdrój	Kornel Witkowski	Mikchail Mogilen	Jakub Lofek	
2020	Cieszyn	Kornel Witkowski	Miłosz Witkowski	Egor Khlopkov	
2021	Gdańsk	Kornel Witkowski	Mikchail Mogilen	Egor Khlopkov	
2022	Cieszyn	Jakub Lofek	Pavlo Klimin	Jakub Roslaniec	
2023	Katowice-Janów	Matvii Iefymenko	Jakub Lofek	Jakub Roslaniec	
2024	Krynica-Zdrój	Jakub Lofek	Matvii Iefymenko	Oscar Oliver	
2025	Krynica-Zdrój	Oscar Oliver	Ryszard Siudek	Kiril Kirichko	
2026	Warsaw	Matvii Iefymenko	Oscar Oliver	Ryszard Siudek	

=== Women's singles ===
Junior women's event medalists
Year	Location	Gold	Silver	Bronze	Ref.
2009	Cieszyn	Zsa Zsa Riordan	Marta Kubia	Paulina Turkowska	
2010	Opole	Agata Kryger	Aleksandra Kamieniecka	Aneta Michałek	
2011	Oświęcim	Aleksandra Kamieniecka	Agata Kryger	Paulina Turkowska	
2012	Cieszyn	Agata Kryger	Weronika Kasprzak	Krystyna Klimczak	
2013	Oświęcim	Agata Kryger	Ada Wawrzyk	Agnieszka Rejment	
2014	Katowice-Janów	Agata Kryger	Marcelina Lech	Weronika Kasprzak	
2015	Cieszyn	Colette Kaminski	Elżbieta Gabryszak	Oliwia Rzepiel	
2016	Gdańsk	Elżbieta Gabryszak	Oliwia Rzepiel	Aleksandra Rudolf	
2017	Krynica-Zdrój	Lucyna Okhrem	Aleksandra Rudolf	Agnieszka Rejment	
2018	Krynica-Zdrój	Oliwia Rzepiel	Julia Kierul	Amelia Konik	
2019	Oświęcim	Ekaterina Kurakova	Oliwia Rzepiel	Julia Kierul	
2020	Krynica-Zdrój	Ekaterina Kurakova	Oliwia Rzepiel	Karolina Białas	
2020	Cieszyn	Laura Szczesna	Natalia Lerka	Agnieszka Rejment	
2021	Gdańsk	Ekaterina Kurakova	Karolina Białas	Natalia Lerka	
2022	Cieszyn	Noelle Streuli	Anastazja Kolosinska	Wiktoria Malyniak	
2023	Katowice-Janów	Noelle Streuli	Weronika Ferlin	Aleksandra Janikowska	
2024	Krynica-Zdrój	Noelle Streuli	Weronika Ferlin	Zofia Bochenek	
2025	Krynica-Zdrój	Noelle Streuli	Weronika Ferlin	Aleksandra Janikowska	
2026	Warsaw	Aleksandra Janikowska	Weronika Ferlin	Zofia Bochenek	

=== Pairs ===
Junior pairs' event medalists
Year	Location	Gold	Silver	Bronze	Ref.
2009	Cieszyn	Natalia Kaliszek; Michał Kaliszek	Anastasja Levshina; Jakub Tyc	Katarzyna Wilczyk; Piotr Snopek	
2010	Opole	Anastasja Levshina; Jakub Tyc	Magdalena Jaskółka; Piotr Snopek	Natalia Kaliszek; Michał Kaliszek	
2011	Oświęcim	Anna Siedlecka; Jakub Tyc	Aleksandra Malinkiewicz; Sebastian Lofek	Magdalena Jaskółka; Piotr Snopek	
2012	Cieszyn	Magdalena Klatka; Radosław Chruściński	Aleksandra Malinkiewicz; Sebastian Lofek	Magdalena Jaskółka; Piotr Snopek	
2013	Oświęcim	Marcelina Lech; Jakub Tyc	Olimpia Klusek; Maciej Litwin	No other competitors	
2014–23	No junior pairs competitors				
2024	Krynica-Zdrój	Wiktoria Pacha; Szymon Derechowski	No other competitors		
2025	Krynica-Zdrój	Wiktoria Pacha; Szymon Derechowski	No other competitors		
2026	(Slovakia) Prešov	No junior pairs competitors			

=== Ice dance ===
Junior ice dance event medalists
Year	Location	Gold	Silver	Bronze	Ref.
2009	Cieszyn	Justyna Plutowska; Dawid Pietrzyński	Olga Yazkova; Rafał Dawidowski	Martyna Ropega; Jacek Blasiak	
2010	Opole	Justyna Plutowska; Dawid Pietrzyński	Joanna Zając; Damian Bińkowski	Olga Yazkova; Rafał Dawidowski	
2011	(Slovakia) Žilina	Baily Caroll; Peter Gerber	Natalia Kaliszek; Michał Kaliszek	Joanna Zając; Damian Bińkowski	
2012	(Czech Republic) Ostrava	Natalia Kaliszek; Michał Kaliszek	Joanna Zając; Damian Bińkowski	Aleksandra Katkova; Radosław Barszczak	
2013	Cieszyn	Joanna Zając; Cezary Zawadzki	No other competitors		
2014	(Slovakia) Bratislava	Beatrice Tomczak; Damian Bińkowski	Natalia Kaliszek; Yaroslav Kurbakov	Joanna Zając; Cezary Zawadzki	
2015	Krynica-Zdrój	Natalia Kaliszek; Maksym Spodyriev	Oleksandra Borysova; Cezary Zawadzki	Natalia Lewandowska; Radosław Barszczak	
2016	(Czech Republic) Třinec	Oleksandra Borysova; Cezary Zawadzki	Jenna Hertenstein; Damian Bińkowski	Elisa Saez; Yann Thayalan	
2017	Katowice	Anastasija Polibina; Radosław Barszczak	Oleksandra Borysova; Cezary Zawadzki	Jenna Hertenstein; Damian Bińkowski	
2018	(Slovakia) Košice	Oleksandra Borysova; Cezary Zawadzki	Zuzanna Sudnik; Danylo Lykhopok	No other competitors	
2019	Oświęcim	Oliwia Borowska; Filip Bojanowski	Olivia Oliver; Petr Paleev	No other competitors	
2020	(Czech Republic) Ostrava	Oliwia Borowska; Filip Bojanowski	Olivia Oliver; Joshua Andari	No other competitors	
2021	Cieszyn	Olivia Oliver; Joshua Andari	Arina Klimova; Filip Bojanowski	Sofiia Dovhal; Wiktor Kulesza	
2022	Cieszyn	Olivia Oliver; Joshua Andari	Sofiia Dovhal; Wiktor Kulesza	Arina Klimova; Filip Bojanowski	
2023	(Hungary) Budapest	Sofiia Dovhal; Wiktor Kulesza	No other competitors		
2024	Krynica-Zdrój	Sofiia Dovhal; Wiktor Kulesza	Julia Berendt; Mateusz Dabrowski	No other competitors	
2025	Krynica-Zdrój	Zofia Grzegorzewska; Oleg Muratov	Laura Balcerska; David Diadchenko	Yelyzaveta Lisova; Jakub Janicki	
2026	(Slovakia) Prešov	Laura Balcerska; David Diadchenko	Yelyzaveta Lisova; Jakub Janicki	Zofia Gawron; Dawid Kaminski	

== Records ==
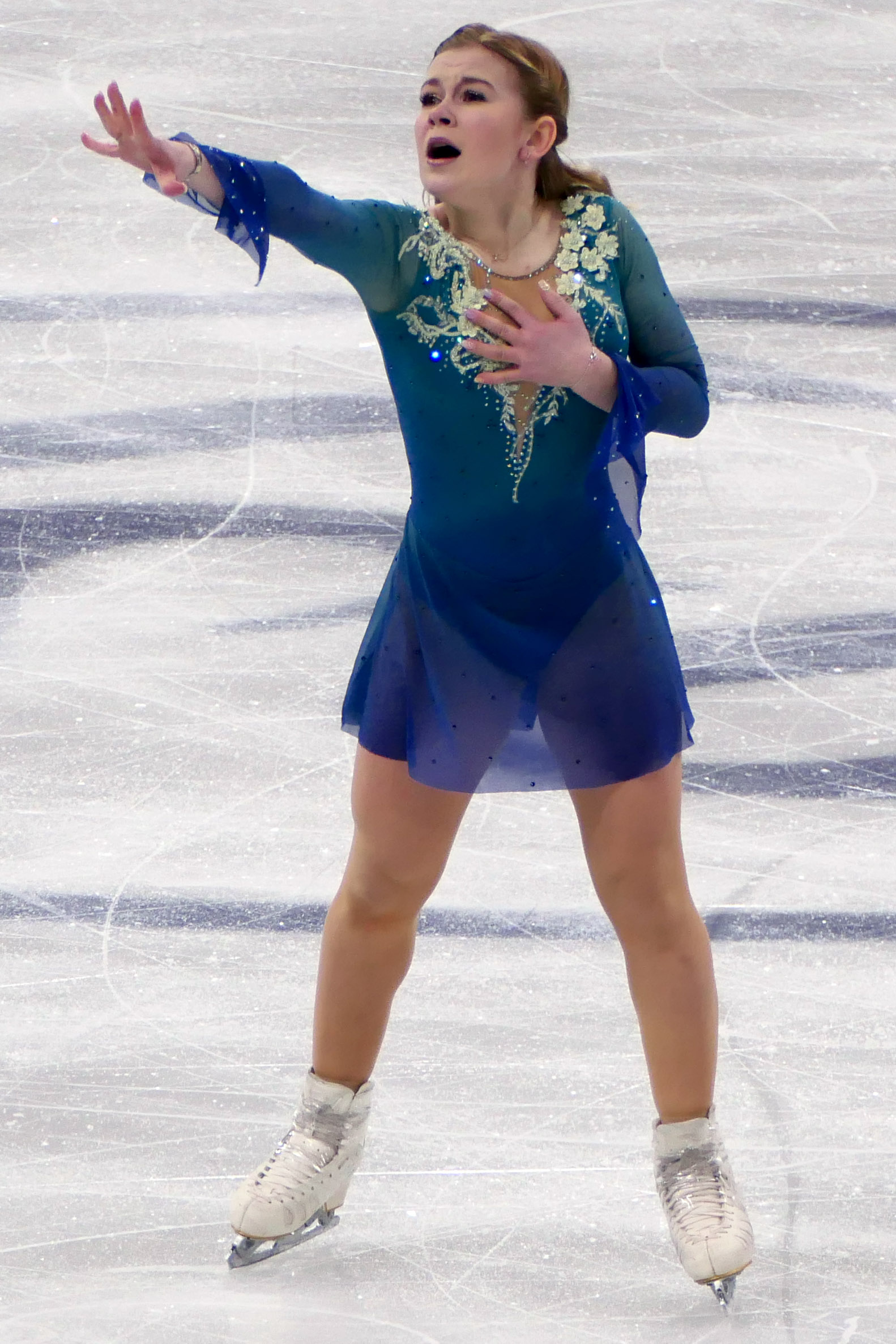
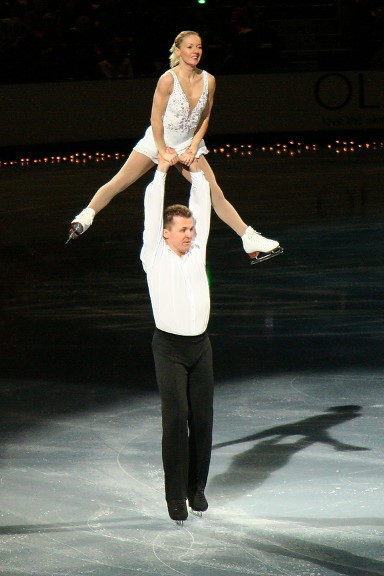
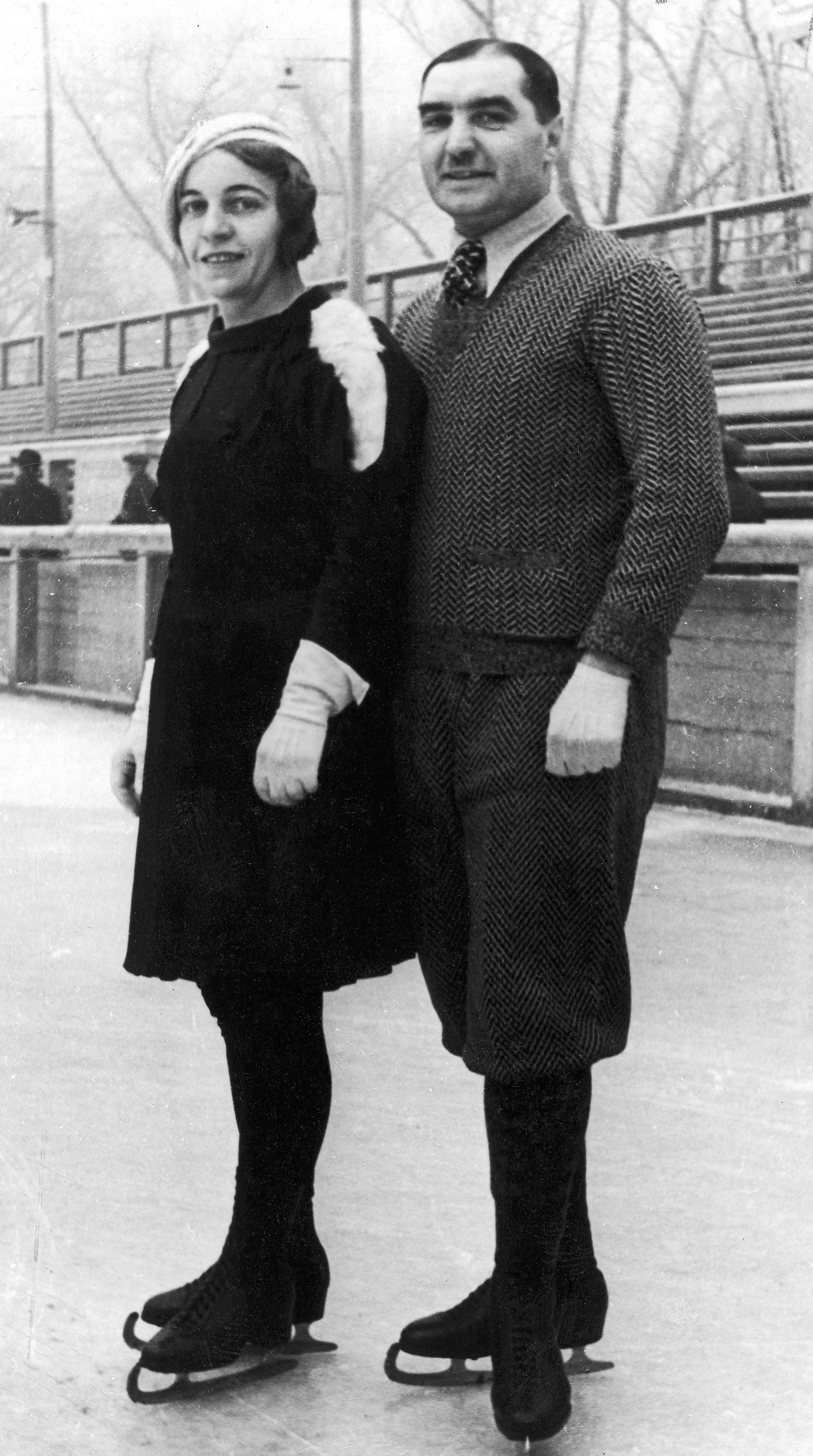
From left to right: Ekaterina Kurakova has won eight Polish Championship titles in women's singles; while Dorota Zagórska and Mariusz Siudek, and Zofia Bilorówna and Tadeusz Kowalski, won nine Polish Championship titles each in pair skating.

Records
Discipline	Most championship titles			
Discipline	Skater(s)	No.	Years	Ref.
Men's singles	Robert Grzegorczyk	7	1992; 1996–2001	
Women's singles	Ekaterina Kurakova	8	2019–26	
Pairs	Zofia Bilorówna; Tadeusz Kowalski	9	1927–35	
Pairs	Dorota Zagórska; Mariusz Siudek	9	1995–2000; 2002–04	
Pairs	Mariusz Siudek; (Note: Mariusz Siudek won one championship title while partnered with Beata Zielińska (1993), one with Marta Głuchowska (1994), and nine with Dorota Zagórska (1995–2000; 2002–04). Zielińska and Siudek were not awarded the title of Polish champions in 1992, because the minimum required number of entrants in the competition was not met.)	11	1993–2000; 2002–04	
Ice dance	Teresa Weyna; Piotr Bojańczyk	9	1968–76	
