= Przemysław Noworyta =

Polish figure skater

Figure skating career
- Country: Poland

Przemysław Noworyta (Polish pronunciation: [pʂɛˈmɨswav nɔvɔˈrɨta]) is a Polish former competitive figure skater. He is a three-time Polish national champion (1987–89) and competed at the European Championships in 1987 and 1988. He was coached by Iwona Mydlarz-Chruścińska in southern Poland.

== Competitive highlights ==
International
Event	1984–85	1985–86	1986–87	1987–88	1988–89
European Championships			20th	23rd	
Prague Skate			9th		
Prize of Moscow News			10th		
National
Polish Championships	3rd	2nd	1st	1st	1st
