= Zdzisław Pieńkowski =

Figure skating career
- Country: Poland
- Retired: 1970s

Zdzisław Pieńkowski is a former Polish competitive figure skater and three-time Polish national champion. He competed at four European Championships from 1966 to 1969. Pieńkowski married Barbara Kossowska, a skating coach and moved to the United States in the 1980s.

== Competitive highlights ==
Event	62-63	63–64	64–65	65–66	66–67	67–68	68–69	69–70
European Championships				16th	16th	17th	17th	
Prague Skate				10th				
Polish Championships	2nd	3rd	2nd	1st	2nd	1st	2nd	1st
