= Jakub Tyc =

Polish figure skater

Personal information
- Born: 13 February 1992 (age 34) Warsaw, Poland
- Height: 1.80 m (5 ft 11 in)

Figure skating career
- Country: Poland
- Partner: Marcelina Lech
- Coach: Sarkis Tewanian; Nina Mozer
- Skating club: RKS Marymont
- Began skating: 1999

Jakub Tyc (born 13 February 1992 in Warsaw, Poland) is a Polish figure skater. He started skating at age seven and competed initially in single skating. After switching to pairs, he skated with Anastasia Levshina and Anna Siedlecka. His current partner is Marcelina Lech.

== Programs ==
(with Levshina)

| Season | Short program | Free skating |
|---|---|---|
| 2009-2010 | Lola | Lord of the Dance by Ronan Hardiman |

== Competitive highlights ==
=== With Lech ===
Results
International
| Event | 2011–2012 | 2012–2013 |
|---|---|---|
| Junior Worlds | | 15th |
| Junior Grand Prix, Croatia | | 13th |
| Junior Grand Prix, Germany | | 12th |
| Toruń Cup | 4th J. | |
| Warsaw Cup | | 4th J. |
National
| Polish Championships | | 1st |
J. = Junior level

=== With Levshina ===
Results
International
| Event | 2008–2009 | 2009–2010 |
|---|---|---|
| Junior Grand Prix, Poland | | 12th J. |
| Junior Grand Prix, Germany | | 16th J. |
| Warsaw Cup | 5th J. | 4th J. |
| NRW Trophy | 5th J. | |
National
| Polish Championships | 2nd J. | |
J. = Junior level

=== Single skating ===
| Event | 2006–2007 |
National
| Polish Junior Championships | 6th J. |
