= Aneta Michałek =

Polish figure skater (born 1991)

Personal information
- Born: 8 May 1991 (age 35) Oświęcim, Poland
- Height: 1.64 m (5 ft 5 in)

Figure skating career
- Country: Poland
- Coach: Iwona Mydlarz-Chruścińska
- Skating club: UKŁF Unia Oświęcim
- Began skating: 1998
- Retired: 2013

Aneta Michałek (Polish pronunciation: [aˈnɛta miˈxawɛk]; born 8 May 1991) is a Polish former competitive figure skater. Competing in pairs with Bartosz Paluchowski, she placed 13th at the 2006 World Junior Championships. She is the 2010 Polish national champion in senior ladies' singles.

== Career ==
Michałek began learning to skate in 1998. She competed in partnership with Mariusz Świerguła before teaming up with Bartosz Paluchowski. Michałek/Paluchowski competed at two ISU Junior Grand Prix (JGP) events and placed 13th at the 2006 World Junior Championships in Ljubljana, Slovenia. The pair was coached by Iwona Mydlarz-Chruścińska in Oświęcim.

As a single skater, Michałek was coached by Mydlarz-Chruścińska and received two JGP assignments. She also competed at the 2008 World Junior Championships in Sofia, placing 39th. In December 2009, she outscored Anna Jurkiewicz by 3.39 points to win the senior ladies' title at the Polish Championships. She represented UKŁF Unia Oświęcim.

After retiring from competitive figure skating, Michałek became an ice hockey player. She plays for SKKH Atomówki GKS Tychy.

== Programs ==
=== Ladies' singles ===
Season	Short program	Free skating
2007–2008	The Piano by Richard Clayderman	Lorelei by Raúl Di Blasio

=== Pairs with Paluchowski ===
Season	Short program	Free skating
2005–2006	The Age of Swing by BBC Big Band	Ogniem i Mieczem by Krzesimir Dębski

== Competitive highlights ==
JGP: ISU Junior Grand Prix

=== Ladies' singles ===
International
Event	06–07	07–08	08–09	09–10	10–11	11–12	12–13
Nebelhorn			22nd				
Ondrej Nepela							21st
Warsaw Cup							19th
International: Junior
Junior Worlds		39th					
JGP Czech Rep.			26th				
JGP Estonia		21st					
Cup of Nice		16th					
Merano Cup		14th					
Warsaw Cup	22nd	14th		9th			
National
Polish Champ.	4th	2nd		1st	2nd	4th	2nd

=== Pairs with Paluchowski ===
International
Event	2005–2006
World Junior Championships	13th
JGP Poland	9th
JGP Bulgaria	5th
Warsaw Cup	1st J
National
Polish Championships	2nd J
J = Junior level

=== Pairs with Świerguła ===
National
Event	2003–2004
Polish Championships	2nd J
J = Junior level
