= Zbigniew Komorowski =

Polish figure skater

Figure skating career
- Country: Poland

Zbigniew Komorowski is a Polish former competitive figure skater. He is the 1994 Polish national senior champion, having won the junior title in the 1991–92 season. He placed 14th at the 1992 World Junior Championships and 18th at the 1994 European Championships. His club was Unia Oświęcim.

== Competitive highlights ==
International
Event	1991–92	1992–93	1993–94	1994–95	1995-96
World Championships			31st		
European Championships			18th	29th	
World Junior Championships	14th				
National
Polish Championships	1st J		1st	1st	2nd
J: Junior level
