= Honorata Górna =

Polish ice dancer

Personal information
- Full name: Honorata Górna
- Born: 7 April 1968 (age 58) Świecie
- Height: 1.66 m (5 ft 5 in)

Figure skating career
- Country: Poland
- Retired: 1988

Honorata Górna (born 7 April 1968 in Świecie) is a Polish former ice dancer. With former partner Andrzej Dostatni, she is a three-time Polish national champion and competed at the 1988 Winter Olympics.

== Results ==
(with Dostatni)

Event	1983–84	1984–85	1985–86	1986–87	1987–88
Winter Olympics					17th
World Championships				15th	17th
European Championships				14th	12th
World Junior Championships	8th				
Polish Championships		1st		1st	1st
Grand Prix Int. de Paris					6th
