= Grażyna Kostrzewińska =

Polish pair skater

Personal information
- Full name: Grażyna Maria Kostrzewińska
- Other names: Grażyna Maria Osmańska
- Born: 26 November 1950 (age 75) Toruń, Poland
- Height: 1.63 m (5 ft 4 in)

Figure skating career
- Country: Poland
- Retired: 1975

Grażyna Maria Kostrzewińska, née Osmańska (born 26 November 1950 in Toruń) is a Polish former pair skater. With Adam Brodecki, she placed 11th at the 1972 Winter Olympics in Sapporo. From 1972, she competed as Grażyna Kostrzewińska, having married footballer Zdzisław Kostrzewiński in 1971.

== Results ==
=== With Brodecki ===
International
Event	1968	1969	1970	1971	1972	1973	1974	1975
Winter Olympics					11th			
World Championships				10th	12th	16th	12th	
European Championships	19th		12th	8th	8th		10th	9th
National
Polish Championships	2nd	2nd	2nd	1st	1st		2nd	2nd

=== With Górecki ===
National
Event	1965	1967
Polish Championships	2nd	2nd
