= Robert Grzegorczyk =

Polish figure skater

Personal information
- Born: 19 February 1973 (age 53) Gdańsk, Poland
- Height: 1.77 m (5 ft 10 in)

Figure skating career
- Country: Poland
- Began skating: 1980
- Retired: 2001

Robert Grzegorczyk (Polish pronunciation: [ˈrɔbɛrd ɡʐɛˈɡɔrt͡ʂɨk]; born 19 February 1973) is a Polish former competitive figure skater. He is an eight-time Polish national champion.

Grzegorczyk started skating at age seven in Gdańsk and moved to Łódź at 14. He retired from competitive skating following the 2000–01 season. He has a degree as a sport teacher from the Academy of Warsaw.

== Programs ==
Season	Short program	Free skating
2000–01	El Farol by Carlos Santana; Sway Radio edit (Mucho Mambo) by Gimbel / Ruiz; La Meta del Vago by Raffi Rosa Gunter Noris Caribic Band	Scott and Fran's Paso Doble (from Strictly Ballroom) by David Hirschfelder The Pogo Pogo Orchestra

== Results ==
International
Event	88–89	90–91	91–92	92–93	93–94	94–95	95–96	96–97	97–98	98–99	99–00	00–01
Worlds				29th		26th	23rd	29th	22nd	23rd	31st	
Europeans				17th			18th	26th	15th	11th	14th	19th
Golden Spin												7th
Nebelhorn Trophy									8th		6th	11th
Nepela Memorial												5th
Piruetten				9th			3rd	6th				
Prague Skate									2nd			
Schäfer Memorial									11th		6th	
Skate Israel										6th	10th	
Universiade												10th
International: Junior
Junior Worlds	22nd	22nd										
Piruetten			5th J									
National
Polish Champ.			1st	2nd	2nd	2nd	1st	1st	1st	1st	1st	1st
J: Junior level
