= Halina Gordon-Półtorak =

Polish ice dancer

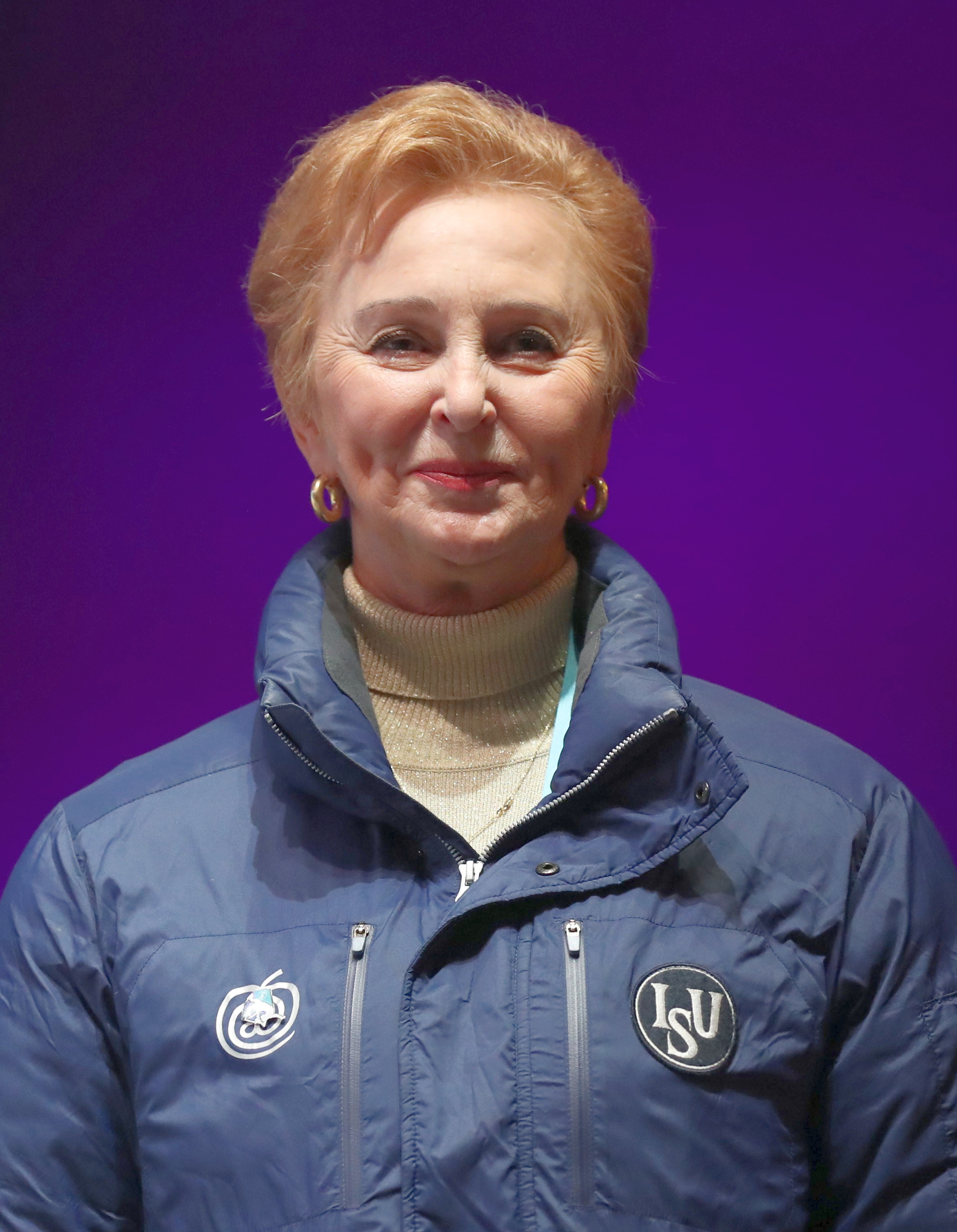

Figure skating career
- Country: Poland
- Retired: c. 1979

Halina Gordon (later Gordon-Półtorak; Polish pronunciation: [xaˈlina ˈɡɔrdɔn puwˈtɔrak]) is a Polish former competitive ice dancer. She is the chair of the ice dancing technical committee at the International Skating Union.

== Career ==
Competing in partnership with Wojciech Bańkowski, Gordon placed 14th at the 1973 World Championships in Bratislava and at the 1975 World Championships in Colorado Springs, Colorado. She is the 1977 Polish national champion with Tadeusz Góra.

In 1977, Gordon formed a partnership with Jacek Tascher, who had just switched from single skating. They became two-time national silver medalists and placed 12th at the 1978 and 1979 European Championships.

Gordon-Półtorak served as the ice dancing referee at the 2010 Winter Olympics in Vancouver. She was elected chair-holder of the International Skating Union's technical committee for ice dancing, becoming the discipline's highest-ranking official. She was re-elected in June 2016.

For many years, until early 2000s, she commented figure skating competitions for Polish national television (Telewizja Polska).

== Competitive highlights ==
=== With Bańkowski ===
International
Event	1972-73	1973-74	1974-75
World Championships	14th		14th
Prize of Moscow News		5th	

=== With Góra ===
International
Event	1976-77
European Championships	10th
National
Polish Championships	1st

=== With Tascher ===
International
Event	1977–78	1978–79
European Championships	12th	12th
National
Polish Championships	2nd	2nd
