= Maciej Kuś =

Polish figure skater

Personal information
- Other names: Maciek Kuś
- Born: 2 August 1982 (age 44) Sosnowiec, Poland
- Height: 1.82 m (5 ft 11 1/2 in)

Figure skating career
- Country: Poland
- Skating club: UKL Spin Katowice
- Began skating: 1988
- Retired: 2005

Maciej "Maciek" Kuś (born 2 August 1982) is a Polish former competitive figure skater. He is the 2004–05 Polish national champion, and competed once at the European Figure Skating Championships, where he placed 27th. He competed twice at the World Figure Skating Championships, placing 31st in 2003 and 34th in 2005. He was 23rd at the 2002 Junior Worlds and placed 16th at the 2005 Winter Universiade.

Kuś coaches skating at LIL Bergen in Norway. In August 2015, he helped coach at Glacier Skate International Training Academy in Whitefish, Montana.

== Programs ==
Season	Short program	Free skating
2003–05	Circus (Orient)	Don Quixote by Ludwig Minkus
2002–03	Winter (from The Four Seasons) by Antonio Vivaldi	Romeo and Juliet by Sergei Prokofiev
2001–02	Winter (from The Four Seasons) by Antonio Vivaldi	Pan Tadeusz by Wojciech Kilar

== Results ==
JGP: Junior Grand Prix

International
Event	00–01	01–02	02–03	03–04	04–05
Worlds			31st		36th
Europeans					28th
Finlandia Trophy					14th
Golden Spin			17th		
Nebelhorn Trophy			12th	12th	11th
Nepela Memorial			7th		
Schäfer Memorial			12th		5th
Universiade					16th
International: Junior
Junior Worlds		23rd			
JGP Italy		16th			
JGP Poland	14th	9th			
Grand Prize SNP		1st J			
Pajovic Cup		1st J			
National
Polish Champ.		1st J		1st	1st
J: Junior level
