= Dawid Pietrzyński =

Polish ice dancer

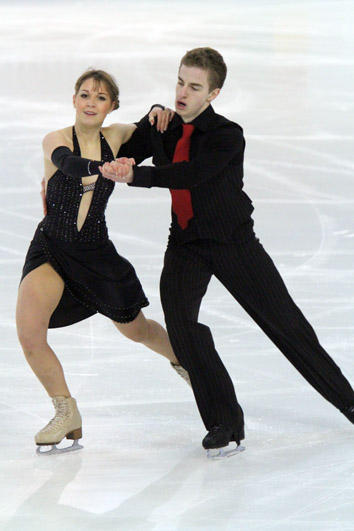
- 2010 World Junior Championships

Personal information
- Born: 22 July 1991 (age 34) Gdańsk, Poland
- Height: 1.74 m (5 ft 8 1/2 in)

Figure skating career
- Country: Poland
- Partner: Justyna Plutowska; Miłosława Zaleska
- Coach: Mirosław Plutowski; Joanna Femeńczuk (choreographer)
- Skating club: GKS Stoczniowiec Gdańsk
- Began skating: 2003

Dawid Pietrzyński (born 22 July 1991) is a Polish former competitive ice dancer. Competing in partnership with Justyna Plutowska, he qualified for the final segment at the 2010 World Junior Championships.

== Career ==
Early in his career, Pietrzyński skated with Miłosława Zaleska. The two won the novice bronze medal at the 2006 Polish Championships.

Pietrzyński teamed up with Justyna Plutowska in 2006. The duo won the junior title at the 2009 Polish Championships and were sent to the 2009 World Junior Championships in Sofia, Bulgaria. They ranked 25th in the compulsory dance and 26th in the original dance, which did not allow them to advance to the final segment.

The following season, Plutowska/Pietrzyński repeated as national junior champions and were assigned to the 2010 World Junior Championships in The Hague, Netherlands. Ranked 18th in both the compulsory and original dances, they qualified to the free dance and finished 20th overall. They were coached by Mirosław Plutowski in Gdańsk.

In the 2010–11 season, Plutowska/Pietrzyński moved up to the senior level and took the silver medal at the Polish Championships, behind Alexandra Zvorigina / Maciej Bernadowski. They made no senior international appearances.

== Programs ==
With Plutowska

Season	Original dance	Free dance
2009–10	Polish polka: Rybaczka by Antoni Sutowski; Polish waltz (Kashubia): Szëmiała leszczëna; Polish polka: Dzek Polnocny z Zalewa	Santa Maria (del Buen Ayre) by Gotan Project; Oblivion by Astor Piazzolla; Santa Maria (del Buen Ayre) by Gotan Project
2008–09	Charleston: Sitting Pretty; Foxtrot; Charleston: Sitting Pretty by Kander and Ebb	Santa Maria (del Buen Ayre) by Gotan Project; Oblivion by Astor Piazzolla; Santa Maria (del Buen Ayre) by Gotan Project

== Competitive highlights ==
JGP: Junior Grand Prix

=== With Plutowska ===
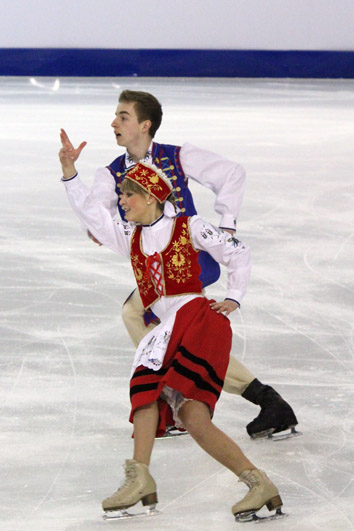
Plutowska/Pietrzynski compete at the 2010 World Junior Championships, wearing costumes from Kashubia

International
Event	06–07	07–08	08–09	09–10	10–11
Junior Worlds			27th	20th	
JGP Croatia		11th			
JGP Czech Republic			13th		
JGP Germany		18th		15th	
JGP Poland				6th	
JGP Spain			15th		
Challenge Cup		2nd J			
NRW Trophy		8th J			
Pavel Roman		9th J			
National
Polish Champ.		2nd J	1st J	1st J	2nd
Regional Children's; Cup of Poland	2nd J				
Mazovia Cup		4th J	1st J	1st J	
J = Junior level

=== With Zaleska ===
National
Event	2005–06
Polish Championships	3rd N
N = Advanced novice level
