= Maria Jeżak-Athey =

Polish figure skater and coach

Maria Jeżak-Athey is a Polish figure skating coach. She is a former Polish national champion in pair skating with Lech Matuszewski. She currently coaches at the Addison Ice Arena in Chicago, Illinois. She coached 2010 Olympic champion Evan Lysacek and 2022 World Champion pairs skater Alexa Scimeca Knierim.

== Results ==
(with Matuszewski)

Event	1979	1980	1981
European Championships	9th	10th	
Polish Championships	1st	1st	1st
