= Janusz Karweta =

Polish pair skater

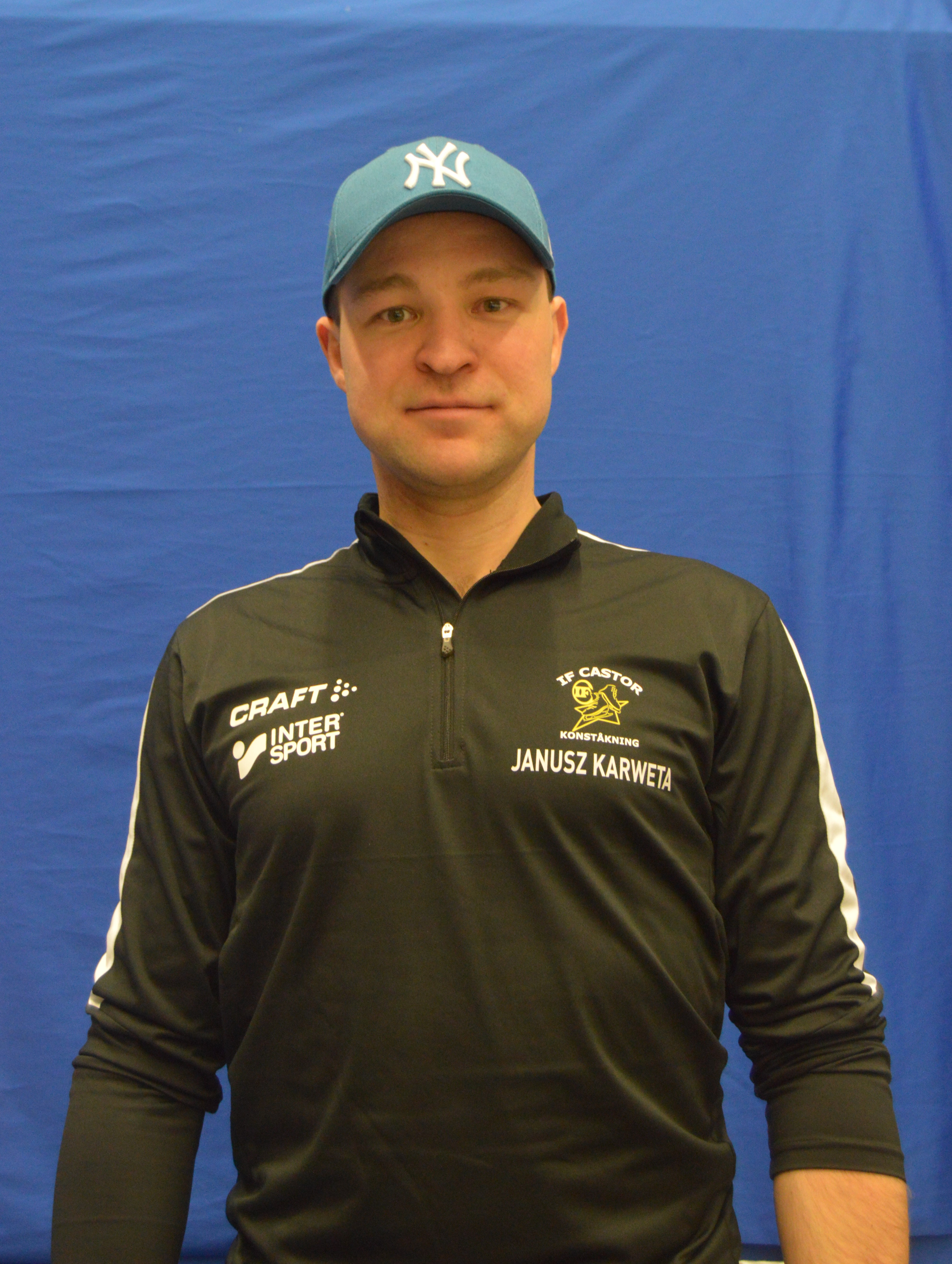

Personal information
- Full name: Janusz Karweta
- Born: 20 March 1988 (age 38) Oswiecim
- Height: 183 cm (6.00 ft)

Figure skating career
- Country: Poland
- Partner: Krystyna Klimczak
- Coach: Iwona Mydlarz-Chruścińska
- Skating club: FSC Unia
- Retired: 2009

Janusz Karweta (born 20 March 1988 in Oświęcim, Poland) is a Polish former competitive pair skater. He competed with Krystyna Klimczak. They are the 2007 Polish national silver medalists. They have competed internationally on the junior level at both Junior Grand Prix events and at the World Junior Figure Skating Championships and received the host wildcard entry to the 2007-2008 Junior Grand Prix Final, where they placed 9th. He also competed as a singles skater at the national level.

Although they placed ninth on the day, they were later moved up a spot to an eighth-place finish at the 2007-2008 Junior Grand Prix Final following the retroactive disqualification of first-place-finishers Vera Bazarova & Yuri Larionov due to a positive doping sample from Larionov.

== Competitive highlights ==
=== Pairs career ===
(with Klimczak)

Event	2005-2006	2006-2007	2007-2008	2008-2009
European Championships				16th
World Junior Championships		13th	16th	13th
Polish Championships		2nd	1st	
Polish Junior Championships	1st	1st		
Nebelhorn Trophy				10th
Junior Grand Prix Final			8th	
Junior Grand Prix, Czech Republic		12th		11th
Junior Grand Prix, Great Britain			15th	13th
Junior Grand Prix, Estonia			14th	
Junior Grand Prix, Norway		11th		
Warsaw Cup	2nd J.	2nd J.		

=== Singles career ===
Event	2003-2004	2004-2005
Polish Championships	5th J.	3rd J.

- N = Novice level; J = Junior level
