= Marcelina Lech =

Polish-Spanish figure skater

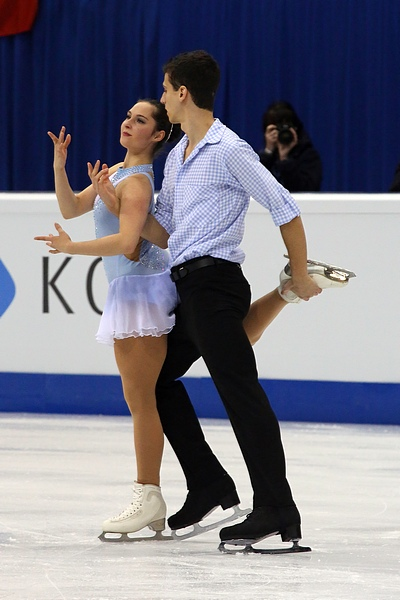
- Marcelina Lech and Aritz Maestu at the 2016 European Championships

Personal information
- Born: 20 November 1996 (age 29) Warsaw, Poland
- Height: 1.58 m (5 ft 2 in)

Figure skating career
- Country: Spain (2014–16); Poland (2010–14)
- Discipline: Pair skating (2011–16); Women's singles (2010–14)
- Partner: Aritz Maestu (2014–16); Jakub Tyc (2011–13)
- Began skating: 2003

Medal record
Representing Spain
Spanish Championships
Gold medal – first place	2015 Granada	Pairs
Gold medal – first place	2016 San Sebastián	Pairs
Representing Poland
Polish Championships
Gold medal – first place	2013 Cieszyn	Pairs

Marcelina Lech (born 20 November 1996) is a Polish-Spanish figure skater. She represented Poland in ladies single skate as a young girl and then turned to pair skating, where she skated for Poland with Jakub Tyc and for Spain with Aritz Maestu.

== Biography ==
Marcelina Lech was born on 20 November 1996 in Warsaw, Poland.

== Competitive highlights ==
=== Pair skating with Aritz Maestu (for Spain) ===
International
Event	2014–15	2015–16
European Champ.		15th
CS Golden Spin		11th
CS Warsaw Cup		8th
Bavarian Open	6th	
Challenge Cup	5th	
Toruń Cup		6th
National
Spanish Champ.	1st	1st

=== Pair skating with Jakub Tyc (for Poland) ===
International
Event	2011–12	2012–13
Junior Worlds		15th J.
JGP Croatia		13th J.
JGP Germany		12th J.
Toruń Cup	4th J.	
Warsaw Cup		4th J.
National
Polish Championships		1st

=== Single skating (for Poland) ===
International
Event	2010–11	2013–14
Toruń Cup		9th J.
Warsaw Cup		12th J.
National
Polish Championships		13th
Polish Junior Champ.	9th J.	2nd J.
