= Jacek Tascher =

Polish figure skater

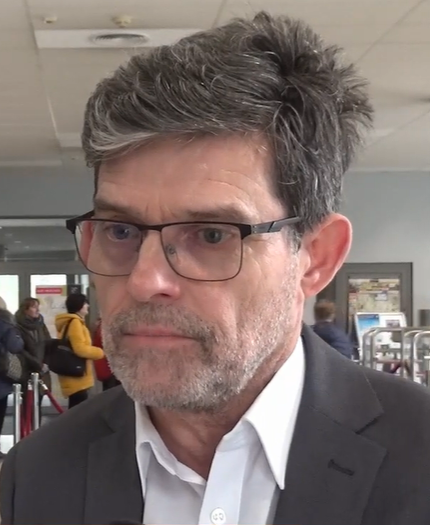

Personal information
- Born: 1957 (age 68–69) Bydgoszcz, Poland

Figure skating career
- Country: Poland
- Retired: c. 1979

Jacek Tascher (born in 1957 in Bydgoszcz) is a Polish former competitive figure skater. In the 1970s, he became a two-time national champion in men's singles and a two-time national silver medalist in ice dancing. He competed at six ISU Championships.

== Career ==
Tascher began skating at Polonia Bydgoszcz when he was 4½ years old. In 1973 and 1975 he won the Polish national title in men's singles. He was sent to two World and two European Championships; his best result was 15th at the 1975 Europeans in Copenhagen.

In 1977, Tascher switched to ice dancing, forming a partnership with Halina Gordon-Półtorak. They became two-time national silver medalists and placed 12th at the 1978 and 1979 European Championships.

In 1989, Tascher founded the Walley Figure Skating Club in Poland. He coaches at the club with his daughter, Magdalena. In 1996, he began providing figure skating commentary for Polish Eurosport. He is also the president of the Polish Figure Skating Association.

== Competitive highlights ==
=== Men's singles ===
Event	70–71	71-72	72–73	73–74	74–75	75–76	76–77
World Championships			21st	19th			
European Championships			16th		15th		
Blue Swords		6th					
Prague Skate						6th	
Polish Championships	3rd	3rd	1st	3rd	1st		3rd

=== Ice dance with Halina Gordon-Półtorak ===
Event	1977–78	1978–79
European Championships	12th	12th
Polish Championships	2nd	2nd
