= Grzegorz Głowania =

Polish figure skater

Personal information
- Born: 1956 (age 69–70) Stalinogród, Polish People's Republic

Figure skating career
- Country: Poland
- Skating club: KKŁ Katowice
- Retired: 1983

Grzegorz Głowania (Polish pronunciation: [ˈɡʐɛɡɔʐ ɡwɔˈvanja]) is a Polish former competitive figure skater. He is the 1980 Blue Swords champion, the 1983 Winter Universiade bronze medalist, and a four-time Polish national champion.

Głowania competed at four European Championships and one World Championship. His skating club was KKŁ Katowice.

== Competitive highlights ==
International
Event	74–75	75-76	76–77	77–78	78–79	79–80	80–81	81–82	82–83
Worlds		15th							
Europeans		15th	12th	11th	14th				
Prague Skate							3rd		5th
Blue Swords	6th					6th	1st		
Universiade							4th		3rd
Prize of Moscow News						5th		?	
National
Polish Champ.	3rd	1st	1st	1st	2nd	1st	2nd	2nd	2nd
