= Adam Brodecki (figure skater) =

Polish pediatrician and ice skater

Personal information
- Full name: Adam Jan Brodecki
- Born: 1 August 1949 Łódź, Poland
- Died: 17 October 2010 (aged 61) Kielce, Poland
- Height: 1.79 m (5 ft 10 in)

Figure skating career
- Country: Poland
- Retired: 1975

Adam Jan Brodecki (1 August 1949 – 17 October 2010) was a Polish pediatrician, member of the Sejm (1989–1991), and former competitive pair skater. With his skating partner, Grażyna Kostrzewińska (Osmańska), he placed 11th at the 1972 Winter Olympics in Sapporo.

With his wife Halina, also a medical doctor, he had two sons, Marcin (born in 1971), Adam (1976), and a daughter, Katarzyna (1983).

== Results ==
=== With Kostrzewińska (Osmańska) ===
International
Event	1968	1969	1970	1971	1972	1973	1974	1975
Winter Olympics					11th			
World Championships				10th	12th	16th	12th	
European Championships	19th		12th	8th	8th		10th	9th
National
Polish Championships	2nd	2nd	2nd	1st	1st		2nd	2nd

=== With Pawlina ===
National
Event	1966
Polish Championships	2nd
