= Andrzej Dostatni =

Polish ice dancer

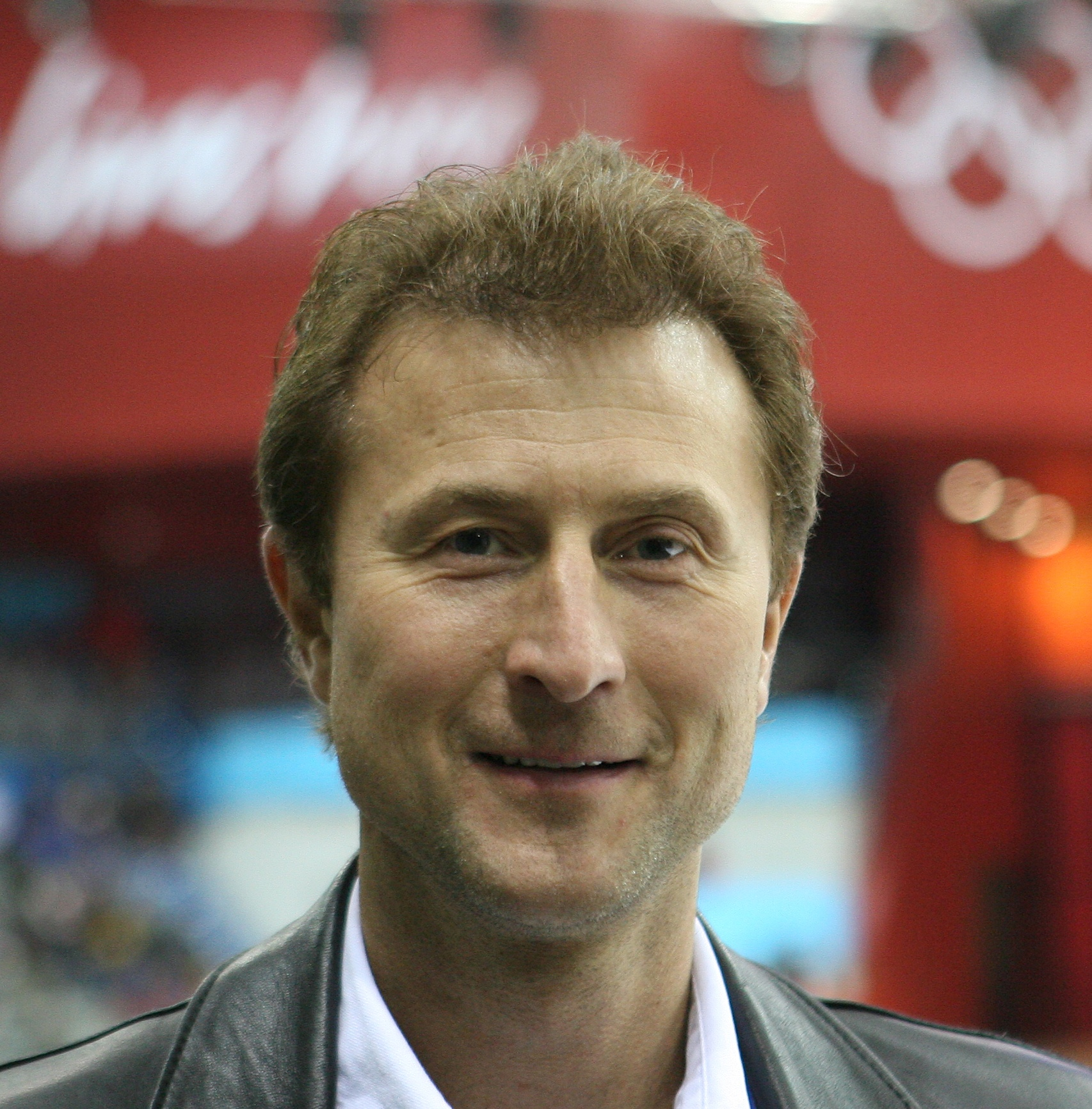
- Dostatni at the 2006 Winter Olympics

Personal information
- Born: 9 December 1966 (age 59) Gdańsk, Poland
- Height: 1.88 m (6 ft 2 in)

Figure skating career
- Country: Poland
- Retired: 1991

Andrzej Dostatni (Polish pronunciation: [ˈandʐɛj dɔˈstatɲi]; born 9 December 1966) is a Polish former competitive ice dancer. With Honorata Górna, he became a three-time Polish national champion and competed at the 1988 Winter Olympics. With Małgorzata Grajcar, he is the 1990 Skate Canada International bronze medalist and a three-time Polish national champion. They finished in the top ten at the 1989 and 1990 European Championships.

== Personal life ==
Dostatni was born on 9 December 1966 in Gdańsk, Poland, to Henryk and Krystyna Tomasini. He married Russian former ice dancer Elena Khalyavina in September 2009.

== Career ==
Dostatni was coached by Teresa Weyna. His first ice dancing partner was Małgorzata Górska.

=== Partnership with Górna ===
Dostatni teamed up with Honorata Górna prior to the 1983–84 season. The two placed 8th at the 1984 World Junior Championships in Sapporo, Japan. In the 1986–87 season, Górna/Dostatni were sent to their first senior ISU Championships – they placed 14th at the 1987 Europeans in Sarajevo, Yugoslavia, and 15th at the 1987 Worlds in Cincinnati, United States.

1987–88 was their final season together. After placing 12th at the 1988 European Championships in Prague, Czechoslovakia, Górna/Dostatni represented Poland at the 1988 Winter Olympics in Calgary, Alberta, Canada, where they placed 17th. Their partnership came to an end following the 1987 World Championships in Budapest, Hungary, where they also ranked 17th.

=== Partnership with Grajcar ===
Grajcar/Dostatni teamed up four months before the Polish Championships in the 1988–89 season. After winning the Polish national title, they were sent to the 1989 European Championships in Birmingham, England, where they finished ninth, and the 1989 World Championships in Paris, France, where they ranked 16th. The duo trained two hours a day at Gdańsk's Oliwia rink, which had frequent technical failures, and other rinks.

The following season, Grajcar/Dostatni repeated as national champions. They placed tenth at the 1990 European Championships in Leningrad, Soviet Union, and 13th at the 1990 World Championships in Halifax, Nova Scotia, Canada.

In the 1990–91 season, Grajcar/Dostatni won bronze at the 1990 Skate Canada International and ranked fifth at the 1990 Skate America. Their final event was the 1991 World Championships in Munich, Germany, where they finished 13th. Lacking funds for a good choreographer, they decided to retire from competition.

=== Later career ===
During his professional career, Dostatni performed for Walt Disney's World on Ice tour with Grajcar. He later teamed up with Darlin Baker. The two performed in Sun Valley ice shows and competed in the US Open.

Dostatni was one of the first ISU technical specialists in ice dancing and performs this function today.

== Competitive highlights ==
=== With Górna ===
International
Event	83–84	84–85	85–86	86–87	87–88
Winter Olympics					17th
World Champ.				15th	17th
European Champ.				14th	12th
Internat. de Paris					6th
International: Junior
World Junior Champ.	8th				
National
Polish Champ.		1st		1st	1st

=== With Grajcar ===
International
Event	1988–89	1989–90	1990–91
World Champ.	16th	13th	13th
European Champ.	9th	10th	
Skate America		8th	5th
Skate Canada			3rd
National
Polish Champ.	1st	1st	1st
