= Krystyna Klimczak =

Polish figure skater

Personal information
- Full name: Krystyna Klimczak
- Born: 24 September 1992 (age 33) Oswiecim
- Height: 1.60 m (5 ft 3 in)

Figure skating career
- Country: Poland
- Coach: Iwona Mydlarz-Chruścińska
- Skating club: FSC Unia
- Retired: 2012

Krystyna Klimczak (born 24 September 1992 in Oświęcim, Poland) is a Polish former competitive figure skater who competed as a single skater and pair skater. As a pair skater, she competed with Janusz Karweta. They were the 2007 Polish national silver medalists. They received the host wildcard entry to the 2007-2008 Junior Grand Prix Final, where they placed 9th. Their partnership ended in 2009.

Although they placed ninth on the day, they were later moved up a spot to an eighth-place finish at the 2007-2008 Junior Grand Prix Final following the retroactive disqualification of first-place-finishers Vera Bazarova & Yuri Larionov due to a positive doping sample from Larionov.

She competed as a single skater on the national level.

== Competitive highlights ==
=== Pairs career ===
(with Karweta)

| Event | 2005-2006 | 2006-2007 | 2007-2008 | 2008-2009 |
|---|---|---|---|---|
| European Championships | | | | 16th |
| World Junior Championships | | 13th | 16th | 13th |
| Polish Championships | | 2nd | 1st | |
| Polish Junior Championships | 1st | 1st | | |
| Nebelhorn Trophy | | | | 10th |
| Junior Grand Prix Final | | | 8th | |
| Junior Grand Prix, Czech Republic | | 12th | | 11th |
| Junior Grand Prix, Great Britain | | | 15th | 13th |
| Junior Grand Prix, Estonia | | | 14th | |
| Junior Grand Prix, Norway | | 11th | | |
| Warsaw Cup | 2nd J. | 2nd J. | | |

- J = Junior level

=== Singles career ===
| Event | 2005-06 | 2009-10 | 2010-11 | 2011-12 |
|---|---|---|---|---|
| Polish Championships | 2nd N. | 4th | 3rd | 3rd |

- N = Novice level
