= Alexandra Kamieniecki =

Polish figure skater

Personal information
- Other names: Ola
- Born: September 1, 1996 (age 29) Calgary, Alberta, Canada
- Home town: Malbork, Poland
- Height: 1.60 m (5 ft 3 in)

Figure skating career
- Country: Poland
- Coach: Alexander ZaitsevIrina Vorobieva
- Skating club: Spin Katowice
- Began skating: 2003
- Retired: 2014

Alexandra Kamieniecki (born September 1, 1996) is a Polish former figure skater. She is the 2014 Polish National Silver Medalist and the 2012 Polish national Champion. She is now a Medical Student at Gdańsk Medical University.

== Programs ==
Season	Short program	Free skating
2012–2013	Masquerade Waltz by Aram Khachaturian	Santa Maria; Diferente by Gotan Project
2011–2012	Masquerade Waltz by Aram Khachaturian	Incantation (from Cirque du Soleil); Harem by Sarah Brightman

== Competitive highlights ==
Competition placements at junior level
Season	2010–11	2011–12	2013–14
World Junior Championships	27th	32nd	
JGP Austria	26th		
JGP Czech Republic	16th		
JGP Romania		15th	
JGP Latvia		9th	
Polish Championships	1st J	1st	2nd
Four Nationals		3rd	9th

== Detailed results ==
- Results of qualification rounds are listed in brackets below the results of the main event in the respective competition segment.

Results in the 2013–14 season
Date	Event	SP		FS		Total	
Date	Event	P	Score	P	Score	P	Score
Dec 20–22, 2013	(Slovakia) 2014 Four National Championships	4	44.91	10	71.23	9	116.14

Results in the 2010–11 season
Date	Event	SP		FS		Total	
Date	Event	P	Score	P	Score	P	Score
Sep 1–3, 2011	2011 JGP Latvia	11	37.74	16	65.96	15	103.70
Sep 22–24, 2011	2011 JGP Romania	8	49.14	10	70.77	9	111.91
Dec 16–17, 2011	(Czech Republic) 2012 Three National Championships	2	44.52	4	80.04	3	124.56
Feb 27–Mar 4, 2012	(Belarus) 2012 World Junior Championships	–	–	(15)	(69.11)	32	DNQ

Results in the 2010–11 season
Date	Event	SP		FS		Total	
Date	Event	P	Score	P	Score	P	Score
Sep 15–19, 2010	2010 JGP Austria	24	32.74	25	54.64	26	87.38
Oct 13–16, 2010	2010 JGP Czech Republic	15	35.97	15	64.90	16	100.87
Feb 27–Mar 6, 2011	(South Korea) 2011 World Junior Championships	27	36.71	–	–	27	36.71
