= Marek Sząszor =

Polish former competitive figure skater (born 1970)

Personal information
- Born: 28 August 1970 (age 55) Gdańsk, Poland
- Height: 1.76 m (5 ft 9 1/2 in)

Figure skating career
- Country: Poland
- Began skating: 1976
- Retired: c. 1999

Marek Sząszor (Polish pronunciation: [ˈmarɛk ˈʂɔ̃ʂɔr]; born 28 August 1970) is a Polish former competitive figure skater. He is a two-time Polish national champion (1990, 1993). After retiring from competition, he became a skating coach in Gdańsk.

== Competitive highlights ==
International
Event	88–89	89-90	90–91	91–92	92–93	93–94	94–95	95–96	96–97	97–98	98–99
European Championships					25th						
Finlandia Trophy								14th			
Golden Spin of Zagreb										13th	11th
Schäfer Memorial									19th		
Nepela Memorial										8th	
Piruetten						21st					
National
Polish Championships	3rd	1st		2nd	1st	3rd		3rd	2nd	3rd	2nd
Lithuanian Championships (Guest)						2nd					
