= Bartosz Domański =

Polish figure skater

Personal information
- Born: 25 August 1980 (age 46) Opole, Poland
- Height: 1.78 m (5 ft 10 in)

Figure skating career
- Country: Poland
- Skating club: Dwory Unia SSA Oswiecim

Bartosz Domański (born 25 August 1980) is a Polish former competitive figure skater. He is the 2002 and 2003 Polish national champion. He competed twice at the European Figure Skating Championships and three times at the World Junior Figure Skating Championships. He and Sabina Wojtala used to coach each other.

He is not related to Przemysław Domański.

== Programs ==
Season	Short program	Free skating
2003–04	The Blues Brothers	The Godfather by Carmine Coppola, Nino Rota
2002–03	Bandyta by Michał Lorenc	The 13th Warrior by Jerry Goldsmith
2001–02	Bandyta by Michał Lorenc	With Fire and Sword by Krzesimir Dębski

== Competitive highlights ==
JGP: Junior Series / Junior Grand Prix

International
Event	96–97	97–98	98–99	99–00	00–01	01–02	02–03	05–06
Europeans						31st	26th	
Nebelhorn Trophy				18th		17th	16th	
Nepela Memorial					16th			
Schäfer Memorial					14th	12th		
Universiade					20th			
International: Junior
Junior Worlds		26th	31st	29th				
JGP Croatia				7th				
JGP Germany		17th	15th					
JGP Slovakia		14th	12th					
Gardena		14th J						
St. Gervais	14th J							
National
Polish Champ.				2nd	2nd	1st	1st	2nd
J: Junior level
