= Małgorzata Grajcar =

Polish ice dancer

Personal information
- Other names: Małgorzata Grajcar-Cieślak

Figure skating career
- Country: Poland
- Retired: 1991

Małgorzata Grajcar-Cieślak (Polish pronunciation: [mawɡɔˈʐata ˈɡrajt͡sar ˈt͡ɕɛɕlak]) is a Polish former competitive ice dancer. With former partner Andrzej Dostatni, she is the 1990 Skate Canada International bronze medalist and a three-time Polish national champion. They finished in the top ten at the 1989 and 1990 European Championships.

== Career ==
Grajcar/Dostatni teamed up four months before the Polish Championships in the 1988–89 season. After winning the Polish national title, they were sent to the 1989 European Championships in Birmingham, England, where they finished ninth, and the 1989 World Championships in Paris, France, where they ranked 16th. The duo trained two hours a day at Gdańsk's Oliwia rink, which had frequent technical failures, and other rinks.

The following season, Grajcar/Dostatni repeated as national champions. They placed tenth at the 1990 European Championships in Leningrad, Soviet Union, and 13th at the 1990 World Championships in Halifax, Nova Scotia, Canada.

In the 1990–91 season, Grajcar/Dostatni won bronze at the 1990 Skate Canada International and ranked fifth at the 1990 Skate America. Their final event was the 1991 World Championships in Munich, Germany, where they finished 13th. Lacking funds for a good choreographer, they decided to retire from competition. After turning professional, they performed for Walt Disney's World on Ice tour.

Grajcar-Cieślak is an ISU ice dancing judge for Poland.

== Competitive highlights ==
(with Dostatni)

International
Event	1988–89	1989–90	1990–91
World Champ.	16th	13th	13th
European Champ.	9th	10th	
Skate America		8th	5th
Skate Canada			3rd
National
Polish Champ.	1st	1st	1st
