= Konstantin Tupikov =

Ukrainian figure skater

Personal information
- Full name: Konstantin Tupikov
- Born: 25 April 1983 (age 43) Odesa, Ukrainian SSR, Soviet Union
- Home town: Warsaw, Poland
- Height: 1.75 m (5 ft 9 in)

Figure skating career
- Country: Poland (2006–10); Ukraine (1998–2006)
- Discipline: Men's singles
- Began skating: 1987

Medal record
Representing Poland
Polish Championships
Gold medal – first place	2008 Oświęcim	Singles
Silver medal – second place	2009 Třinec	Singles
Bronze medal – third place	2007 Oświęcim	Singles
Representing Ukraine
Ukrainian Championships
Gold medal – first place	2003 Kyiv	Singles
Silver medal – second place	2004 Kyiv	Singles
Bronze medal – third place	2000 Kyiv	Singles
Bronze medal – third place	2001 Kyiv	Singles

Konstantin Tupikov (born 25 April 1983) is a former competitive figure skater who represented Ukraine until 2005 and then decided to compete for Poland. He is the 2003 Ukrainian national champion and 2008 Polish national champion.

== Programs ==
Season	Short program	Free skating
2007–08	Quidam (from Cirque du Soleil)	Tosca Fantasy by Edvin Marton
2002–03	You Don't Know by Jan Marks	The Millennium Show by Peter Gabriel
2000–01	Dragonheart by Randy Edelman	Rhapsody in Rock by Robert Wells

== Results ==
=== For Poland ===
International
Event	05–06	06–07	07–08	08–09	09–10
Worlds			40th		
Europeans			21st		
Cup of Nice					13th
Crystal Skate					8th
Finlandia Trophy			9th		
Golden Spin				12th	
Schäfer Memorial				8th	
Merano Cup				3rd	
NRW Trophy			6th		
National
Polish Champ.	5th	3rd	1st	2nd	

=== For Ukraine ===
JGP: Junior Grand Prix

International
Event	98–99	99–00	00–01	01–02	02–03	03–04	04–05	05–06
Worlds					30th		35th	
Europeans			22nd		20th			
Crystal Skate				4th				
Schäfer Memorial					10th			
Nepela Memorial								15th
International: Junior
Junior Worlds			27th					
JGP Poland			7th					
JGP Ukraine			10th					
EYOF	8th J							
National
Ukrainian Champ.	2nd J.	3rd	3rd	4th	1st	2nd	5th	
