= Artur Szeliski =

Polish ice dancer

Personal information
- Height: 185 cm (6 ft 1 in)

Figure skating career
- Country: Poland
- Partner: Molly Marcon
- Coach: Sarkis Tewanian
- Skating club: GKS Stoczniowiec Gdańsk

Artur Szeliski (born 28 October 1979 in Gdańsk) is a Polish ice dancer. He competed with Molly Marcon, with whom he was the 2002 Polish national silver medalist. He previously skated with Luiza Kowalczyk and Diana Chabros.

== Competitive highlights ==
- 2002 : Polish Nationals - 2nd,
- 2001 : World Junior Figure Skating Championships - 17th,
- 2001 : Golden Spin of Zagreb - 8th.
