= Ilona Senderek =

Polish figure skater

Personal information
- Born: December 15, 1988 (age 37) Warsaw, Poland
- Height: 170 cm (5 ft 7 in)

Figure skating career
- Country: Poland
- Coach: Anna Hunkiewicz
- Skating club: Euro 6 Warsaw
- Began skating: 1998
- Retired: 2007

Ilona Senderek-Wójcik (Polish pronunciation: [iˈlɔna sɛnˈdɛrɛk ˈvui̯t͡ɕik]; born 15 December 1988) is a Polish former competitive figure skater. She is the 2004 Polish national champion and competed in the final segment at the 2005 World Junior Championships.

== Personal life ==
Senderek-Wójcik was born on 15 December 1988 in Warsaw, Poland. She graduated from the Warsaw University of Technology with a degree in biotechnology.

== Career ==
Senderek started her sports career as a roller skater and competed in a couple of competitions at the national level. She soon became interested in figure ice-skating and started regular training in that sport in 1998. She qualified to the final segment at the 2005 World Junior Championships in Kitchener, Ontario, Canada; she ranked 10th in her qualifying group, 20th in the short program, 23rd in the free skate, and 24th overall.

Senderek-Wójcik is an International Technical Specialist. She coaches figure skating in Warsaw. She is the coach of Polish national silver medalist Oliwia Rzepiel.

== Programs ==
Season	Short program	Free skating
2004–2005	Bolero from Moulin Rouge!	Swing; Sing, Sing, Sing

== Competitive highlights ==
JGP: ISU Junior Grand Prix

International
Event	02–03	03–04	04–05	05–06	06–07
Junior Worlds			24th		
JGP Croatia		21st			
JGP Estonia				18th	
JGP Germany			26th		
JGP Netherlands					16th
JGP Poland		23rd		22nd	
EYOF			8th J		
Gardena Trophy	15th J	9th J			
Warsaw Cup		3rd J			4th J
National
Polish Champ.		1st J	1st	2nd	3rd
