= Olga Szelc =

Polish figure skater

Personal information
- Born: May 1, 1994 (age 32)
- Height: 168 cm (5 ft 6 in)

Figure skating career
- Country: Poland
- Coach: Dorota Siudek, Mariusz Siudek
- Skating club: MKS Axel Toruń

Olga Szelc (born May 1, 1994 in Toruń, Poland) is a Polish figure skater. She has been starting in Ladies single category. Started skating at the age of 5.

== Programs ==
Season	Short program	Free skating	Exhibition
2009-2010	Spanish Medley	Bandyta by Michał Lorenc	unknown

== Competitive highlights ==
Event	2005-06	2006-07	2007–08		2008–09		2009–10	2010–11
Polish Championships	10th G.	2nd G.	2nd N.	9 J.	3rd N.	9 J.	3rd	4th
Junior Grand Prix, Poland							26th J.	
Cupe de Nice							22nd J.	
Warsaw Cup	17th N.				23 J.		17th J.	
Ice Challenge							13th J.	

- (nothing) = Senior level
- J. = Junior level
- N. = Novice level
- G. = Gold level
