= Teresa Skrzek =

Polish pair skater

Personal information
- Born: 1957 (age 68–69)

Figure skating career
- Country: Poland
- Partner: Piotr Sczypa
- Skating club: Naprzód Janów
- Retired: 1970s

Teresa Skrzek (born in 1957) is a Polish former pair skater. With her skating partner, Piotr Sczypa, she became a three-time Polish national champion. The pair competed at five ISU Championships – five European Championships and two World Championships. Their skating club was Naprzód Janów.

== Competitive highlights ==
with Sczypa

International
Event	70–71	71–72	72–73	73–74	74–75
World Championships	17th		16th		
European Championships	13th	12th	10th	11th	11th
Blue Swords			6th		
National
Polish Championships			1st	1st	1st
