= Jolanta Wesołowska =

Polish ice dancer

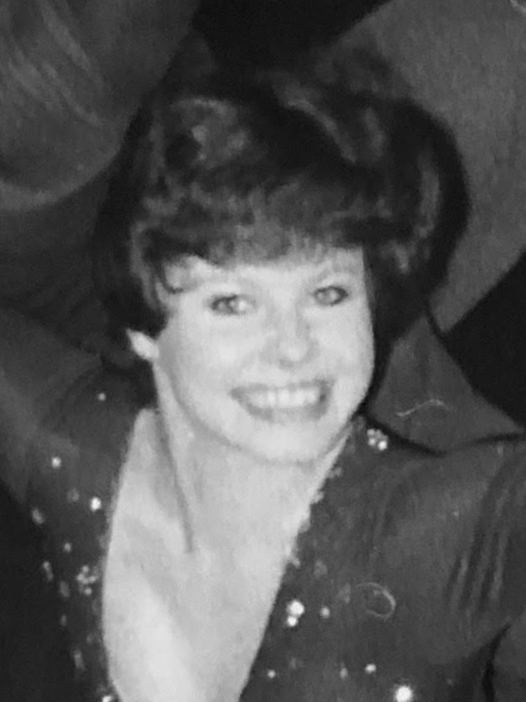
Jolanta Wesolowska in 1978.

Jolanta (Jola) Wesolowska-Mantilla (born 11 November 1958) is a former Polish competitive figure skater. Wesolowska is a multiple-time Polish National Champion in Ice Dancing (ice dancing with Andrzej Alberciak, 1978, 1979, 1980, 1982), and represented Poland at the 1978 European Figure Skating Championships.

== Personal life ==
Jola Wesolowska was born in Łódź, Poland, and attended the Łódź University of Technology, where she graduated with a master's degree in organic chemistry After concluding her competitive career, she moved with her family to the United States.

She currently resides in Illinois where she coaches aspiring figure skaters in the Chicago area.
