= Aleksandra Rudolf =

Polish figure skater

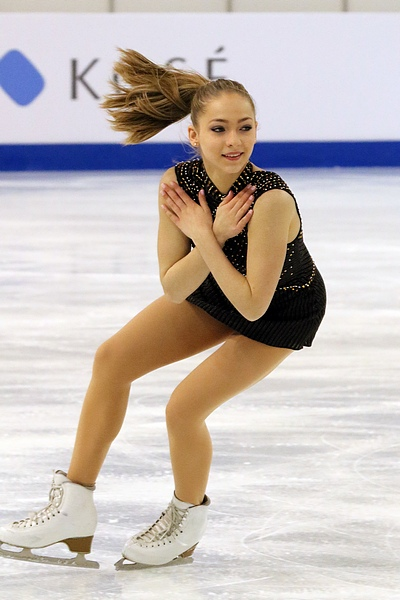

Personal information
- Born: 10 January 2002 (age 24) Bydgoszcz, Poland
- Height: 1.57 m (5 ft 2 in)

Figure skating career
- Country: Poland
- Coach: Dorota and Mariusz Siudek
- Skating club: MKS Axel Toruń
Medal record
Representing Poland
Polish Championships
Gold medal – first place	2016 Třinec	Singles

Aleksandra Rudolf (born 10 January 2002) is a Polish figure skater. She is the 2016 Polish national champion.

On the junior level, she is the 2017 Polish national silver medalist, and the 2016 Polish junior national bronze medalist.

== Career ==
Rudolf started skating in 2007. She debuted internationally in the 2015-16 season. After a three season break, she returned to competition during the 2020-21 season.

== Programs ==
Season	Short program	Free skating
2015-2016	"Fly Me to the Moon" by Bart Howard and Quincy Jones	La Vie En Rose by Louiguy and Louis Armstrong; Mack the Knife by Kurt Weill and Louis Armstrong

== Competitive highlights ==
JGP: Junior Grand Prix; CS: Challenger Series

Event	15–16	16–17	20-21
International: Junior
Junior Worlds	39th		
JGP Spain	24th		
JGP Poland	23rd		
Toruń Cup	10th	26th	
Golden Bear	6th		
National
Polish Champ.	1st		7th
Polish Junior Champ.	3rd	2nd	
Four Nationals	9th		12th
