= Gabriela Hrázská =

Czech former competitive ice dancer (born 1979)

Personal information
- Full name: Gabriela Žilková Hrázská
- Born: 21 July 1979 (age 46) Brno, Czechoslovakia
- Height: 1.75 m (5 ft 9 in)

Figure skating career
- Country: Czech Republic
- Discipline: Ice dance

Medal record
Czech Championships
Gold medal – first place	1999 Karviná	Ice dance

Gabriela Žilková Hrázská (born 21 July 1979) is a Czech former competitive ice dancer. With Jiří Procházka, she is the 1999 Czech national champion and placed sixth at the 1998 World Junior Championships. She is currently a coach and choreographer. She has worked with the following skaters:

- Anna Dušková / Martin Bidař
- Anna Dušková
- Petr Kotlařík
- Jan Kurnik
- Gabriela Kubová / Dmitri Kiselev
- Nikola Višňová / Lukáš Csolley
- Klára Kadlecová / Petr Bidař
- Kamila Hájková / David Vincour
- Anaïs Morand / Antoine Dorsaz
- Eliška Březinová
- Kristína Kostková
- Ivana Buzková

== Competitive highlights ==
(with Procházka)

International
Event	1996–97	1997–98	1998–99
World Championships			23rd
European Championships			20th
International: Junior
World Junior Championships	13th	6th	
Junior Series, Hungary		8th	
Junior Series, Slovakia		5th	
Blue Swords	15th		
Autumn Trophy	14th		
Euro. Youth Olympic Festival	6th J.		
National
Czech Championships		1st J	1st
J. = Junior level
