= Kamila Vokoun Hájková =

Czech former competitive ice dancer (born 1987)

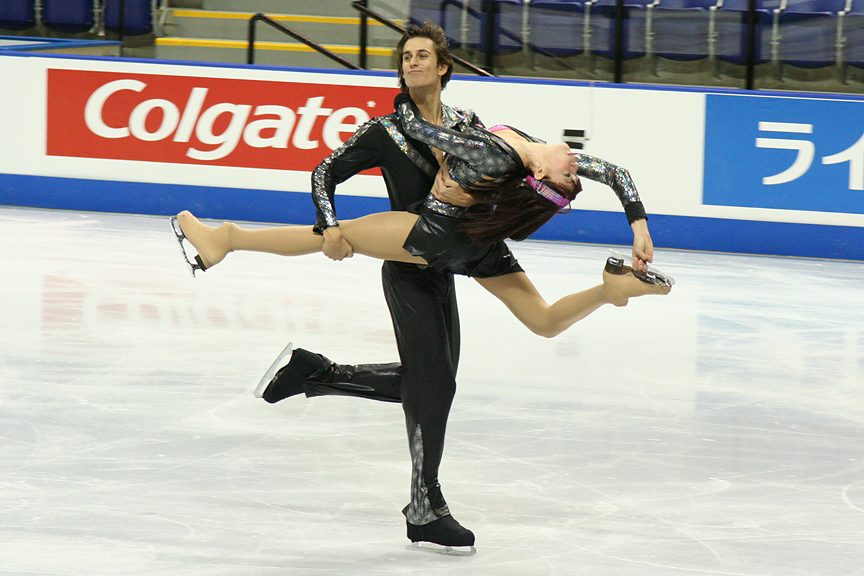
- Hájková/Vincour in 2006

Personal information
- Born: 25 September 1987 (age 39) Polička, Czechoslovakia
- Height: 1.70 m (5 ft 7 in)

Figure skating career
- Country: Czech Republic
- Discipline: Ice dance
- Partner: David Vincour
- Coach: Rostislav Sinicyn, Natalia Karamysheva, Gabriela Hrázská, Ivan Rezek
- Skating club: TJ Stadion Brno
- Retired: 2010

Medal record
Czech Championships
Gold medal – first place	2006 České Budějovice	Ice dance
Gold medal – first place	2007 Liberec	Ice dance
Gold medal – first place	2008 Trenčín	Ice dance
Gold medal – first place	2009 Třinec	Ice dance
Gold medal – first place	2010 Cieszyn	Ice dance

Kamila Vokoun Hájková (born 25 September 1987 in Polička) is a Czech former competitive ice dancer. With David Vincour, she is a two-time Ondrej Nepela Memorial bronze medalist, the 2005 Golden Spin of Zagreb bronze medalist, a two-time Pavel Roman Memorial champion, and a five-time Czech national champion. The two competed in the final segment at seven ISU Championships and at the 2010 Winter Olympics.

== Career ==
Hájková began skating at age six, appearing as a singles skater until 15, and then switched to ice dance. She competed with David Vincour. The two made their junior international debut in October 2003, placing tenth at the Junior Grand Prix event in Zagreb, Croatia.

Ranked 14th in the compulsory dance, 9th in the original dance, and 11th in the free dance, Hájková/Vincour finished tenth overall at the 2005 World Junior Championships in Kitchener, Ontario, Canada.

Hájková/Vincour moved up to the senior ranks the following season. In September, they took bronze at the 2005 Ondrej Nepela Memorial. The following month, they finished 12th at the 2005 Karl Schäfer Memorial, the final qualifying opportunity for the 2006 Winter Olympics in Turin. Their result was insufficient to earn a spot at the Olympics. They won two medals in November – bronze at the 2005 Golden Spin of Zagreb and gold at the 2005 Pavel Roman Memorial. They placed 19th at the 2006 European Championships in Lyon, France. At the 2006 World Championships in Calgary, they were eliminated after the original dance, finishing 27th overall.

Hájková/Vincour finished 17th at the 2007 European Championships in Warsaw, Poland. Vincour was later hospitalized and underwent surgery and, as a result, the duo missed the 2007 World Championships.

They began the next season with a win at the 2007 Pavel Roman Memorial, outscoring Carolina Hermann / Daniel Hermann and Lucie Myslivečková / Matěj Novák. They would qualify to the final segment at both the 2008 European Championships in Zagreb, where they placed 17th, and at the 2008 World Championships in Gothenburg, where they finished 23rd.

Hájková/Vincour placed 17th at the 2009 European Championships in Helsinki, Finland, but did not appear at the 2009 World Championships.

In September 2009, the Czech Republic earned an Olympic spot. Hájková/Vincour won bronze at the 2009 Ondrej Nepela Memorial and were sent to the 2010 Winter Olympics in Vancouver, where they finished 21st.

Hájková retired from competition after the 2010 Olympics and began coaching. She was an ambassador for the Czech team at the 2012 Winter Youth Olympics. In 2014, she became the project manager at the International Sambo Federation. In July 2022, she moved to the Fédération Aéronautique Internationale as Members and Anti-Doping Manager.

== Programs ==
(with Vincour)

Season	Original dance	Free dance
2009–2010	Czech folk: Jízda králů; Anička dušička	Non, je ne regrette rien; Les flonflons du bal by Édith Piaf performed by Radka Fišarová
2008–2009	Mack the Knife (from The Threepenny Opera) by Kurt Weill performed by Louis Armstrong; Ragtime by Max Raabe	Mythodea by Vangelis
2007–2008	Czech folk: Jízda králů; Anička dušička; Polka	Blue Suede Shoes; I Want You, I Need You, I Love You; Trouble by Elvis Presley
2006–2007	Libertango arranged by Myung-Whun Chung; Tango by Astor Piazzolla	Blue Suede Shoes; I Want You, I Need You, I Love You; Trouble by Elvis Presley
2005–2006	Samba: Lo-Lo Dzhama; Mambo: Wonder; Samba: Lo-Lo Dzhama by Shum Svistu	Roméo et Juliette by Gerard Presgurvic; Le Balcon; Le Bal; Aimer; Les Rois du Monde
2004–2005	Charleston: Golden Nugget; Slow foxtrot: Take my Love; Charleston: Golden Nugget	Roméo et Juliette by Gerard Presgurvic; Le Balcon; Le Bal; Aimer; Les Rois du Monde

== Competitive highlights ==
GP: Grand Prix; JGP: Junior Grand Prix

With Vincour

International
Event	03–04	04–05	05–06	06–07	07–08	08–09	09–10
Olympics							21st
Worlds			27th		23rd		
Europeans			19th	17th	17th	17th	18th
GP Cup of Russia					9th		
GP NHK Trophy				9th			
GP Skate Canada				10th			
Golden Spin			3rd		7th		
Nebelhorn Trophy			10th			6th	
Nepela Memorial			3rd			4th	3rd
Pavel Roman			1st		1st		
Schäfer Memorial			12th	6th		5th	
Universiade						12th	
International: Junior
Junior Worlds		10th					
JGP Croatia	10th						
JGP Germany		7th					
JGP Poland	13th						
JGP Serbia		4th					
Pavel Roman		1st J					
National
Czech Champ.		1st J	1st	1st	1st	1st	1st
J = Junior level
