= Otto Dlabola =

Czech pair skater (born 1973)

Personal information
- Born: 13 December 1973 (age 52) Jaroměř, Czechoslovakia
- Height: 1.82 m (6 ft 0 in)

Figure skating career
- Country: Czech Republic
- Partner: Kateřina Beránková
- Skating club: TJ Stadion Brno
- Began skating: 1980
- Retired: January 2005

Medal record
Czech Championships
Gold medal – first place	1995 Ústí nad Labem	Pairs
Gold medal – first place	1996 Třinec	Pairs
Gold medal – first place	1998 Brno	Pairs
Gold medal – first place	1999 Karviná	Pairs
Gold medal – first place	2000 Mladá Boleslav	Pairs
Gold medal – first place	2002 Karviná	Pairs
Gold medal – first place	2003 Brno	Pairs
Gold medal – first place	2004 Hradec Králové	Pairs

Otto Dlabola (born 13 December 1973) is a Czech retired pair skater. Initially, he skated with Veronika Joukalová, and in 1997, he teamed up with Kateřina Beránková. Beránková and Dlabola finished 8th at the 2002 Winter Olympics. In January 2005, they announced their retirement from competition.

Dlabola is a figure skating coach. He worked with Klára Kadlecová / Petr Bidař.

== Programs ==
(with Beránková)

Season	Short program	Free skating
2004–2005	Quitare Town, Era - Music Mix arranged by Martin Zezula	In the Pictures by Petr Hapka
2003–2004	Bandyta by Michał Lorenc	In the Pictures by Petr Hapka
2002–2003	Bandyta by Michał Lorenc	El Piano de America by Raúl Di Blasio
2001–2002	Pajaro Campana by Raúl Di Blasio	El Piano de America by Raúl Di Blasio
2000–2001	Concerto in F Minor by George Gershwin, performed by the Slovak Philharmonic Orchestra	The Mask of Zorro by James Horner

== Results ==
GP: Champions Series / Grand Prix

=== Pairs with Beránková ===
International
Event	97–98	98–99	99–00	00–01	01–02	02–03	03–04
Olympics	15th				8th		
Worlds	14th	12th	13th	12th	11th	11th	
Europeans	8th	7th	8th		5th	6th	5th
GP Cup of Russia			6th		8th		8th
GP NHK Trophy						6th	
GP Skate Canada		6th					
Nebelhorn Trophy	7th						
Nepela Memorial	2nd	1st					
Schäfer Memorial	3rd	2nd					
Skate Israel			2nd				
National
Czech Champ.	1st	1st	1st		1st	1st	1st

=== Pairs with Joukalová ===
International
Event	1993–94	1994–95	1995–96	1996–97
World Championships		WD	20th	
European Championships		15th	13th	
Ondrej Nepela Memorial				3rd
National
Czech Championships	2nd	1st	1st	
