= Kateřina Mrázová =

Kateřina Mrázová may refer to:

- Kateřina Mrázová (figure skater), Czech ice dancer
- Kateřina Mrázová (ice hockey), Czech ice hockey player

== See also ==
- Kateřina Mrázková, Czech ice dancer
