= Buzková =

Buzková is a surname. Notable people with the surname include:

- Petra Buzková (born 1965), former minister of the Czech Republic
- Ivana Buzková (born 1985), Czech figure skater

== See also ==
- Marie Bouzková (born 1998), Czech tennis player
