= Jiří Procházka (ice dancer) =

Czech ice dancer

Personal information
- Born: June 25, 1980 (age 46) Vyškov, Czechoslovakia
- Home town: Brno
- Height: 1.83 m (6 ft 0 in)

Figure skating career
- Country: Czech Republic
- Discipline: Ice dance
- Skating club: TJ Stadion Brno
- Began skating: 1995

Medal record
Czech Championships
Gold medal – first place	1999 Karviná	Ice dance
Gold medal – first place	2002 Karviná	Ice dance
Gold medal – first place	2003 Brno	Ice dance
Gold medal – first place	2005 Ostrava	Ice dance
Silver medal – second place	2001 Mladá Boleslav	Ice dance
Silver medal – second place	2004 Hradec Králové	Ice dance

Jiří Procházka (born June 25, 1980) is a Czech ice dancer. He is the 2005 Czech champion with Diana Janošťáková, 2002 and 2003 champion with Veronika Morávková, and 1999 champion with Gabriela Hrázská.

== Competitive highlights ==
=== With Janošťáková ===
Event	2003–04	2004–05
World Championships	25th	
European Championships		19th
Czech Championships	2nd	1st
Cup of Russia		10th
Skate Canada		10th
Golden Spin of Zagreb		1st
Pavel Roman Memorial		1st
Winter Universiade		8th

=== With Morávková ===
Event	2000–01	2001–02	2002–03
World Championships		18th	16th
European Championships		16th	13th
Czech Championships	2nd	1st	1st
Nebelhorn Trophy		8th	5th
Ondrej Nepela Memorial		2nd	2nd
Karl Schäfer Memorial		5th	
Bofrost Cup on Ice			7th

=== With Hrázská ===
International
Event	1996–97	1997–98	1998–99
World Championships			23rd
European Championships			20th
International: Junior
World Junior Championships	13th	6th	
Junior Series, Hungary		8th	
Junior Series, Slovakia		5th	
Blue Swords	15th J.		
Autumn Trophy	14th J.		
Euro. Youth Olympic Festival	6th J.		
National
Czech Championships		1st J	1st

=== With Kuncová ===
Event	1996
World Junior Championships	17th
