= David Vincour =

Czech former competitive ice dancer (born 1984)

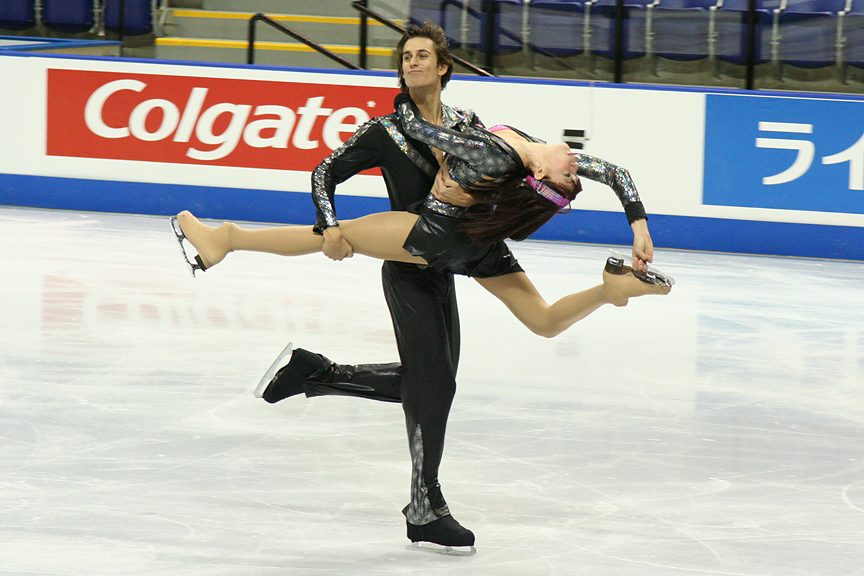
- Hajkova/Vincour in 2006.

Personal information
- Born: 14 March 1984 (age 42) Brno, Czechoslovakia
- Height: 1.89 m (6 ft 2 1/2 in)

Figure skating career
- Country: Czech Republic; Austria
- Discipline: Ice dance
- Partner: Kamila Hájková (CZE), Sabine Pichler (AUT), Barbara Herzog (AUT)
- Coach: Rostislav Sinicyn, Natalia Karamysheva, Gabriela Hrázská, Ivan Rezek
- Skating club: TJ Stadion Brno

Medal record
Czech Championships
Gold medal – first place	2006 České Budějovice	Ice dance
Gold medal – first place	2007 Liberec	Ice dance
Gold medal – first place	2008 Trenčín	Ice dance
Gold medal – first place	2009 Třinec	Ice dance
Gold medal – first place	2010 Cieszyn	Ice dance

David Vincour (born 14 March 1984, in Brno) is a Czech former competitive ice dancer. Skating with Kamila Hájková, he became a five-time Czech national champion and competed at the 2010 Winter Olympics.

== Career ==
Vincour began skating at age five, stopped until he was 12, then took up ice dancing and competed for Austria with Sabine Pichler and Barbara Herzog. He then competed with Kamila Hájková for the Czech Republic. The two are the 2006-2010 Czech national champions and the 2005 Ondrej Nepela Memorial bronze medalists.

During the 2006–07 season, Vincour was hospitalized for an extended period due to intestinal problems and underwent surgery and, as a result, they missed the World Championships. After the 2009–10 season, they decided to take some time off from competition and Vincour began skating in shows.

== Programs ==
=== With Hájková ===
Season	Original dance	Free dance
2009–2010	Czech folk: Jízda králů; Anička dušička	Non, je ne regrette rien; Les flonflons du bal by Édith Piaf performed by Radka Fišarová
2008–2009	Mack the Knife (from The Threepenny Opera) by Kurt Weill performed by Louis Armstrong; Ragtime by Max Raabe	Mythodea by Vangelis
2007–2008	Czech folk: Jízda králů; Anička dušička; Polka	Blue Suede Shoes; I Want You, I Need You, I Love You; Trouble by Elvis Presley
2006–2007	Libertango arranged by Myung-Whun Chung; Tango by Astor Piazzolla	Blue Suede Shoes; I Want You, I Need You, I Love You; Trouble by Elvis Presley
2005–2006	Samba: Lo-Lo Dzhama; Mambo: Wonder; Samba: Lo-Lo Dzhama by Shum Svistu	Roméo et Juliette by Gerard Presgurvic; Le Balcon; Le Bal; Aimer; Les Rois du Monde
2004–2005	Charleston: Golden Nugget; Slow foxtrot: Take my Love; Charleston: Golden Nugget	Roméo et Juliette by Gerard Presgurvic; Le Balcon; Le Bal; Aimer; Les Rois du Monde

=== With Herzog ===
Season	Original dance	Free dance
2000–2001	March: March of the Mods performed by Joe Loss Orchestra; Foxtrot: A Doodlin Song by Peggy Lee; Quickstep: Le Jazz Hot!	The Last of the Mohicans by Trevor Jones

== Competitive highlights ==
GP: Grand Prix; JGP: Junior Grand Prix

=== With Hájková for the Czech Republic ===
International
Event	03–04	04–05	05–06	06–07	07–08	08–09	09–10
Olympics							21st
Worlds			27th		23rd		
Europeans			19th	17th	17th	17th	18th
GP Cup of Russia					9th		
GP NHK Trophy				9th			
GP Skate Canada				10th			
Golden Spin			3rd		7th		
Nebelhorn Trophy			10th			6th	
Nepela Memorial			3rd			4th	3rd
Pavel Roman			1st		1st		
Schäfer Memorial			12th	6th		5th	
Universiade						12th	
International: Junior
Junior Worlds		10th					
JGP Croatia	10th						
JGP Germany		7th					
JGP Poland	13th						
JGP Serbia		4th					
Pavel Roman		1st J					
National
Czech Champ.		1st J	1st	1st	1st	1st	1st
J = Junior level

=== With Herzog for Austria ===
International
Event	1999–2000	2000–2001
World Junior Championships	28th	22nd
JGP Czech Republic		12th
JGP Norway		13th
Grand Prize SNP	6th J	
National
Austrian Championships	1st J	1st J
J = Junior level

=== With Pichler for Austria ===
International
Event	1998–1999
World Junior Championships	22nd
JGP Bulgaria	9th
JGP Hungary	7th
Autumn Trophy	6th J
National
Austrian Championships	1st J
J = Junior level
