= Petr Knoth =

Czech former ice dancer (born 1983)

Personal information
- Born: 6 November 1983 (age 42) Brno, Czechoslovakia
- Height: 1.87 m (6 ft 1 1/2 in)

Figure skating career
- Country: Czech Republic
- Discipline: Ice dance
- Partner: Petra Pachlová
- Coach: František Blaťák; Natalia Vorobieva
- Skating club: TJ Stadion Brno
- Began skating: 1996
- Retired: 2005

Medal record
Czech Championships
Gold medal – first place	2004 Hradec Králové	Ice dance
Silver medal – second place	2003 Brno	Ice dance
Silver medal – second place	2005 Ostrava	Ice dance

Petr Knoth (born 6 November 1983) is Professor of Data Science at the Knowledge Media institute, The Open University. He leads the Big Scientific Data and Text Analytics Group (BSDTAG) which conducts research and develops new technologies powered by AI in the area of the machine processing of scientific information. He is the Founder and Head of CORE (COnnecting REpositories), a large not-for-profit full text indexing system for open access papers with millions of monthly active users. CORE makes research papers available for people to freely discover and access, and for machines to text-mine.

In this capacity, he has been involved in numerous knowledge exchange cooperations with enterprises, funders and not-for-profit organisations, supporting a wide variety of use cases requiring scalable access to research content.

Petr has a deep interest in the use of AI to improve research workflows. He has been involved as a researcher and as a principle investigator in over 25 European Commission, national and international funded research projects in the areas of NLP, AI, Open Science and Technology Enhanced Learning and has over 100 peer-reviewed publications based on this work.

Until 2005, he was also a Czech ice dancer. With Petra Pachlová, he competed in the final segment at five ISU Championships – the 2004 European Championships and four World Junior Championships.

== Former Ice Dancing Career ==
Knoth began learning to skate in 1996. He and his skating partner, Petra Pachlová, made their ISU Junior Grand Prix (JGP) debut in 2000. They finished 23rd at the 2002 World Junior Championships in Hamar, Norway; and 13th at the 2003 World Junior Championships in Ostrava, Czech Republic.

In October 2003, Pachlová/Knoth won bronze at a JGP event in Ostrava, Czech Republic. In January, they outscored Diana Janošťáková / Jiří Procházka to win the Czech national senior title and were selected to compete at the 2004 European Championships. Making their senior international debut, they finished 19th at the European Championships, which took place the following month in Budapest, Hungary. In March, they achieved their career-best ISU Championship result, tenth, at the 2004 World Junior Championships in The Hague, Netherlands. They were coached by Natalia Vorobieva until the end of the season.

František Blaťák coached Pachlová/Knoth during the 2004–05 season. After placing fourth at a JGP event in Budapest, they took silver at their October JGP assignment in Kyiv, Ukraine. They were named first alternates for the ISU Junior Grand Prix Final. In December, they finished second to Janošťáková/Procházka at the Czech Championships. In March, they finished 11th at the 2005 World Junior Championships in Kitchener, Ontario, Canada. It was their final competition together.

== Programs ==
(with Pachlová)

Season	Original dance	Free dance
2004–2005	Quickstep: Let Me Be a Dancing Fool; Foxtrot: More by Frank Sinatra; Quickstep: Let Me Be a Dancing Fool	I Will Survive by Gloria Gaynor; Blues by Gary Moore; I Will Survive by Gloria Gaynor
2003–2004	I Put a Spell on You by Mica Paris, David Gilmour; Jump, Jive an' Wail by Brian Setzer and Orchestra	Dance with Me (1998 film): Jazz Machine by Black Machine; Eres Todo en Mí by Ana Gabriel; Pantera En Libertad by Mónica Naranjo
2002–2003	Waltz performed by André Rieu and Orchestra; Polka by Henry Mancini	The Mask
2001–2002	Paso Doble; Spanish Waltz	The Mask

== Competitive highlights ==
with Pachlová

International
Event	98–99	99–00	00–01	01–02	02–03	03–04	04–05
Europeans						19th	
International: Junior
Junior Worlds				23rd	13th	10th	11th
JGP Bulgaria				9th			
JGP Czech Rep.			16th	5th		3rd	
JGP Germany			14th				
JGP Hungary							4th
JGP Serbia					4th		
JGP Slovakia					4th		
JGP Slovenia						5th	
JGP Ukraine							2nd
EYOF					4th		
Grand Prize SNP			1st	1st			
Pavel Roman					1st		
National
Czech Champ.	3rd J	3rd J	2nd J	1st J	1st J	1st	2nd
