= Nella Simaová =

Czech figure skater

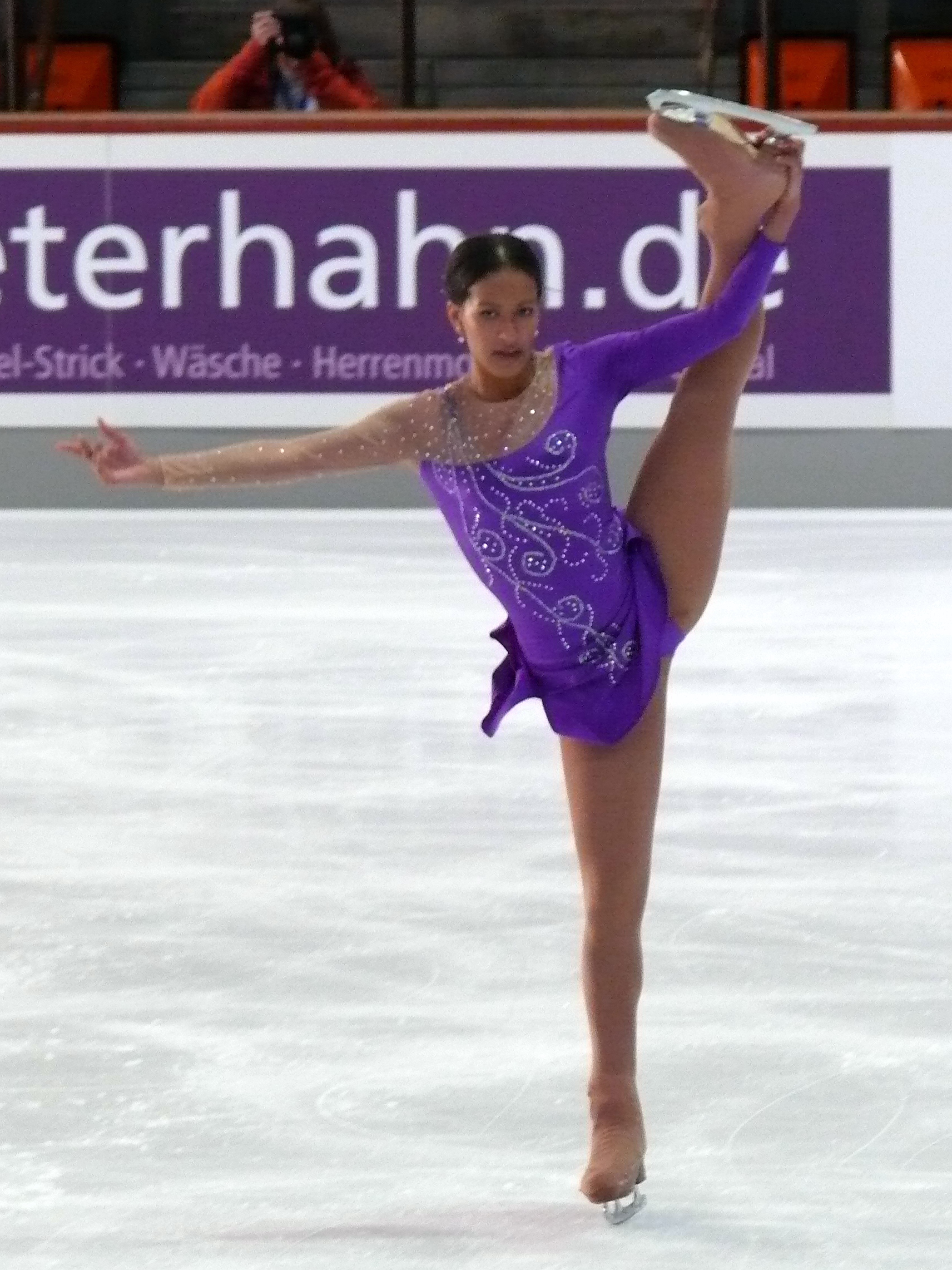
- Simaová in 2008.

Personal information
- Full name: Nella Simaová
- Born: 21 July 1988 (age 38) Brno, Czechoslovakia
- Home town: Ostrava, Czech Republic
- Height: 1.68 m (5 ft 6 in)

Figure skating career
- Country: Czech Republic
- Skating club: BK LR Cosmetic Ostrava
- Began skating: 1992
- Retired: 2010

Medal record
Czech Championships
Gold medal – first place	2008 Trenčín	Singles
Gold medal – first place	2009 Třinec	Singles
Silver medal – second place	2007 Liberec	Singles
Bronze medal – third place	2010 Cieszyn	Singles

Nella Simaová (born 21 July 1988) is a Czech former competitive figure skater. She is the 2006 Golden Spin of Zagreb champion and a two-time Czech national champion (2008 and 2009). She qualified to the free skate at three ISU Championships – 2006 Junior Worlds in Ljubljana, Slovenia; 2008 Europeans in Zagreb, Croatia; and 2009 Europeans in Helsinki, Finland.

== Programs ==
Season	Short program	Free skating
2008–2010	Chicago by John Kander and Fred Ebb	Wild Flowers by Jan Jirásek
2007–2008	Assassin's Tango (from Mr. & Mrs. Smith) by John Powell	Madama Butterfly by Giacomo Puccini
2006–2007	Flamenco	Madama Butterfly by Giacomo Puccini
2005–2006	Music by Sergei Rachmaninoff	Black Hawk Down by Hans Zimmer

== Results ==
JGP: Junior Grand Prix

International
Event	03–04	04–05	05–06	06–07	07–08	08–09	09–10
Worlds					32nd	30th	
Europeans					15th	14th	
Golden Spin				1st	9th	9th	
Merano Cup							17th
Nebelhorn					14th	16th	13th
Nepela Memorial				5th			
Schäfer Memorial						WD	
Universiade						20th	
International: Junior
Junior Worlds			18th	29th	27th		
JGP Austria					10th		
JGP Croatia			9th				
JGP Czech Republic				20th			
JGP Estonia			13th				
JGP Germany					7th		
JGP Netherlands				13th			
EYOF		12th					
Gardena		6th					
National
Czech Champ.	4th J	1st J	1st J	2nd	1st	1st	3rd
