= Gabriela Kubová =

Czech ice dancer (born 1993)

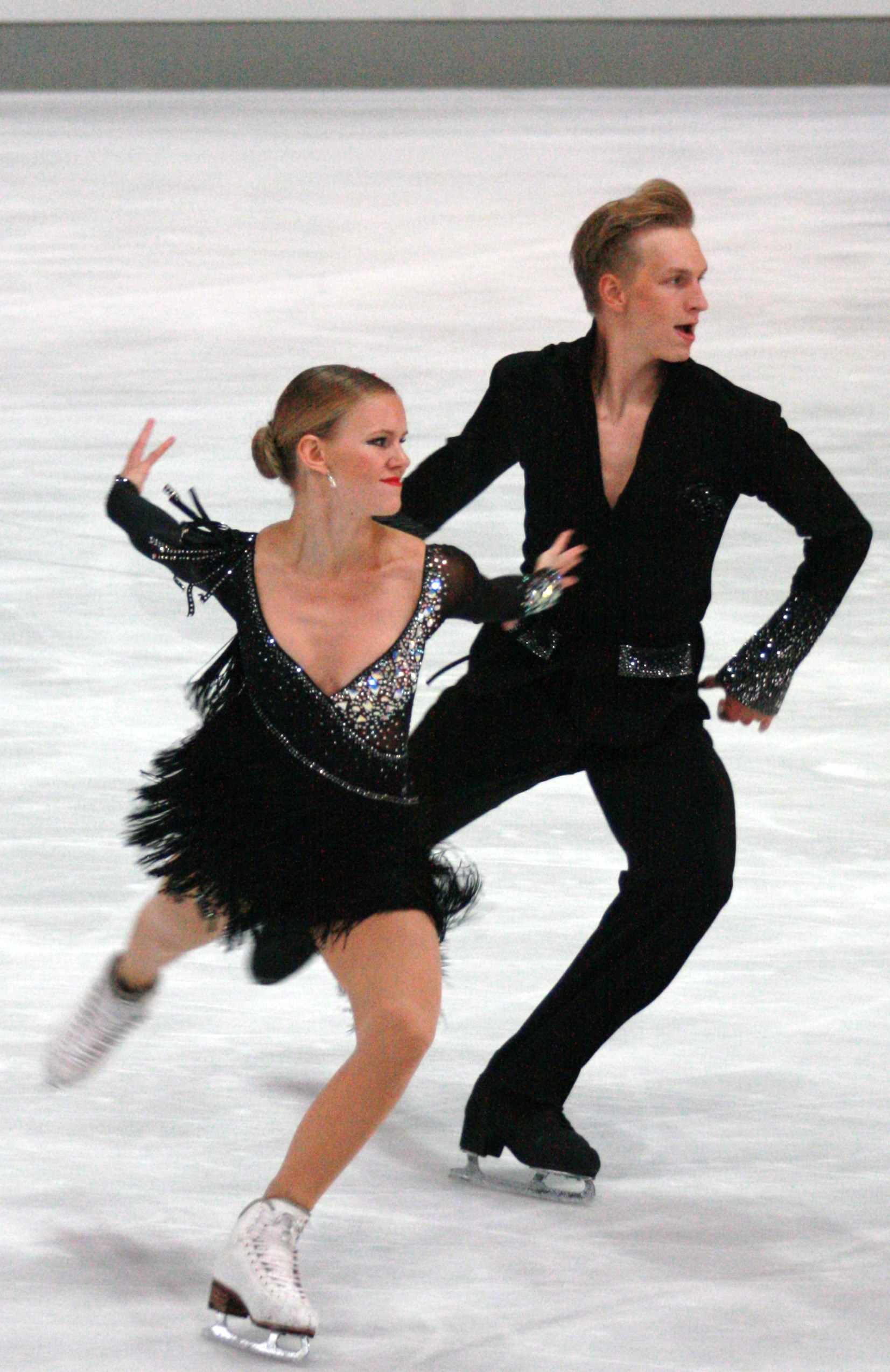
- Kubová/Novák in 2013.

Personal information
- Born: 9 May 1993 (age 33) Brno, Czech Republic
- Height: 1.67 m (5 ft 6 in)

Figure skating career
- Country: Czech Republic
- Discipline: Ice dance
- Partner: Matěj Novák
- Skating club: TJ Stadion Brno
- Began skating: 1997

Medal record
Czech Championships
Gold medal – first place	2012 Ostrava	Ice dance
Silver medal – second place	2013 Cieszyn	Ice dance

Gabriela Kubová (born 9 May 1993) is a Czech ice dancer who competes with Matěj Novák. With her former partner, Dmitri Kiselev, she was the 2012 Czech national champion.

== Career ==
Early in her career, Kubová skated with Petr Seknička. They competed on the ISU Junior Grand Prix series for two seasons.

In 2009, Kubová teamed up with the Russian ice dancer Kiselev to compete for the Czech Republic. In their first two seasons together, they competed on the junior level and were placed 14th at the 2010 World Junior Championships. Moving up to the senior level in the 2011–12 season, Kubová/Kiselev won the silver medal at the Pavel Roman Memorial and gold at the Czech national championships. They were assigned to the 2012 European Championships, finishing 18th, and to the 2012 World Championships, finishing 26th. Kiselev retired from competition in autumn 2012.

In 2012, Kubová teamed up with Novák.

== Programs ==
=== With Novák ===
Season	Short dance	Free dance
2013–2014	Vive Le Swing by In-Grid; You Are the One For Me; Soy lo que me das	Tango medley

=== With Kiselev ===
Season	Short dance	Free dance
2012–2013	Polka: Kytice z Uherskobrodska; Waltz: Valcik choreo. by Gabriela Hrázská	The Last Temptation of Christ by Peter Gabriel: With this Love; The Feeling Begins choreo. by Sergei Petukhov
2011–2012	Skip to the Bip by Brenda Boykin; Happy Brasilia by James Last choreo. by Gabriela Hrázská	Be Italian (from Nine) performed by Fergie choreo. by Sergei Petukhov
2010–2011	Waltz: Pardonne-moi ce caprice d'enfant; Tango: Parisien Tango by Mireille Mathieu	Shatritsa (Gypsy dance)
	Original dance	
2009–2010	Czech folk dance: Straznican - Rez Rez Rez; Este som sa neozenil	Luna by Alessandro Safina

== Competitive highlights ==
=== With Novák ===
Results
International
Event	2012–13	2013–14
World Championships		27th
Nebelhorn Trophy		16th
NRW Trophy		7th
Ondrej Nepela Memorial		7th
Volvo Open Cup	7th	
National
Czech Championships	2nd	WD
WD = Withdrew

=== With Kiselev ===
Results
International
Event	2009–10	2010–11	2011–12
World Championships			26th
European Championships			18th
Nebelhorn Trophy			12th
NRW Trophy			10th
Ondrej Nepela Memorial			6th
Pavel Roman Memorial		4th J.	2nd
Toruń Cup			5th
International: Junior
World Junior Championships	14th		
JGP Czech Republic		9th	
JGP France		9th	
Mont Blanc Trophy		2nd J.	
National
Czech Championships	1st J.	2nd J.	1st
J. = Junior level; JGP = Junior Grand Prix

=== With Seknička ===
Results
International
Event	2007–08	2008–09
JGP Austria	17th	
JGP Czech Republic		11th
JGP Germany	15th	
JGP Great Britain		14th
Pavel Roman Memorial	7th J.	3rd J.
Grand Prize SNP	5th J.	
EYOF		3rd J.
National
Czech Championships	2nd J	2nd J
