= Karel Štefl =

Czech pair skater

Personal information
- Full name: Karel Štefl
- Born: 27 February 1982 (age 44) Slaný, Czechoslovakia
- Home town: Tuřany
- Height: 1.76 m (5 ft 9 1/2 in)

Figure skating career
- Country: Czech Republic
- Skating club: TJ Stadion Brno
- Began skating: 1990

Medal record
Czech Championships
Gold medal – first place	2006 České Budějovice	Pairs
Silver medal – second place	2001 Mladá Boleslav	Pairs
Silver medal – second place	2002 Karviná	Pairs
Silver medal – second place	2004 Hradec Králové	Pairs

Karel Štefl (born 27 February 1982 in Slaný) is a Czech pair skater.

== Career ==
Between 1999 and 2001, Štefl competed with Radka Zlatohlavková and placed 21st at the 2000 Junior World Championships.

From 2001 to 2004, Štefl skated with Veronika Havlíčková. They competed at the European Championships and on the Grand Prix series, and won a bronze medal on the Junior Grand Prix series.

In the 2005–2006 season, Štefl competed with Russian skater Olga Prokuronova and won the 2006 Czech senior national title. They placed 10th in the short program at the 2006 European Championships in Lyon, France, but suffered a fall on a lift in the free skate. Prokuronova lay on the ice for several seconds before Štefl helped her to her feet and she exited the ice. They withdrew from the event. An ISU doctor said Prokuronova had not sustained a serious injury but was taken to the hospital for further examination. In October 2006, it was reported that she had declined to resume the partnership.

== Programs ==
=== With Prokuronova ===
Season	Short program	Free skating
2005–2006	Xotika by René Dupéré	Madagascar; Pearl Harbor

=== With Havlíčková ===
Season	Short program	Free skating
2003–2004	Selections performed by Bond	Rhapsody in Blue; The Man in Love; Rhapsody in Blue by George Gershwin performed by the London Symphony Orchestra
2002–2003	Musíme si pomáhat by Aleš Březina	Dance of the Hours by Amilcare Ponchielli; Comedians' Galop by Dmitry Kabalevsky both performed by the Boston Pops Orchestra
2001–2002	Chicken Run by L. Williams performed by the Boston Pops Orchestra	Dance of the Hours by Amilcare Ponchielli; Comedians' Galop by Dmitry Kabalevsky both performed by the Boston Pops Orchestra

== Results ==
=== With Prokuronova ===
Results
International
Event	2005–2006
European Championships	WD
National
Czech Championships	1st
WD = Withdrew

=== With Havlíčková ===
Results
International
Event	2001–2002	2002–2003	2003–2004
European Championships			11th
GP Skate America			9th
GP Cup of China			9th
International: Junior
World Junior Championships	11th	11th	
JGP Czech	4th		
JGP Italy	4th	3rd	
JGP Slovakia		5th	
EYOF		4th	
National
Czech Championships	2nd		2nd
Czech Junior Champ.	1st	1st	
GP = Grand Prix; JGP = Junior Grand Prix

=== With Zlatohlavková ===
Results
International
Event	1999–2000	2000–2001
World Junior Championships	21st	
JGP Czech Republic		7th
National
Czech Championships	1st J	2nd
JGP = Junior Grand Prix
