= Olga Prokuronova =

Russian former pair skater (born 1989)

Personal information
- Born: 3 July 1989 (age 37) Moscow, Russian SFSR
- Height: 1.55 m (5 ft 1 in)

Figure skating career
- Retired: 2006

Medal record
Czech Championships
Gold medal – first place	2006 České Budějovice	Pairs

Olga Prokuronova (Russian: Ольга Прокуронова; born 3 July 1989) is a Russian former pair skater. Prokuronova competed with Czech skater Karel Štefl and won the 2006 Czech senior national title. They placed 10th in the short program at the 2006 European Championships in Lyon, France, but suffered a fall on a lift in the free skate. Prokuronova lay on the ice for several seconds before Štefl helped her to her feet and she exited the ice. They withdrew from the event. An ISU doctor said Prokuronova had not sustained a serious injury but was taken to the hospital for further examination. In October 2006, it was reported that she had declined to resume the partnership.

== Programs ==
(with Štefl)

Season	Short program	Free skating
2005–2006	Xotika by René Dupéré	Madagascar; Pearl Harbor

== Competitive highlights ==
(with Štefl)

Results
International
Event	2005–2006
European Championships	WD
National
Czech Championships	1st
WD = Withdrew

(with Goncharov)

Event	2002–2003
Russian Cup Final	3rd
