= Radek Horák =

Czech figure skater

Personal information
- Born: 8 January 1977 (age 49) Most, Czechoslovakia
- Height: 1.73 m (5 ft 8 in)

Figure skating career
- Country: Czech Republic
- Began skating: 1983
- Retired: 2002

Radek Horák (born 8 January 1977) is a Czech former figure skater. He is a two-time Czech national champion (1996, 1998) and placed 24th at the 1998 European Championships in Milan. His skating club was TJ Stadion Brno.

Horák married Ukrainian-Russian pair skater Julia Obertas.

== Competitive highlights ==
International
Event	93–94	94–95	95–96	96–97	97–98	98–99	99–00	00–01	01–02
World Championships		13th Q	31st						
European Championships		12th Q			24th				
Czech Championships		2nd	1st	2nd	1st	2nd	2nd		3rd
Czech Skate			11th		5th				
Finlandia Trophy					15th				
Golden Spin of Zagreb							11th		
Nebelhorn Trophy							14th		
Nepela Memorial		11th		7th	11th	14th	6th	17th	
Karl Schäfer Memorial				17th	18th	7th	8th		
Skate Israel							13th		
Blue Swords Cup		26th J	20th J						
Grand Prize SNP	6th J								
