= Dmitri Kiselev =

Russian ice dancer (born 1989)

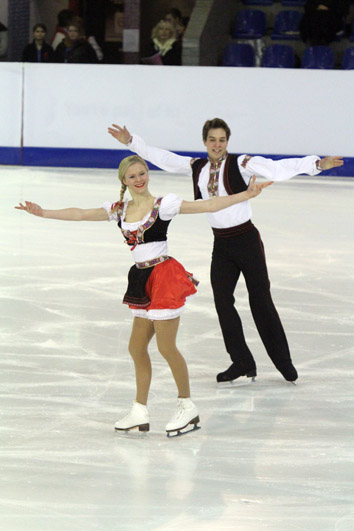
- Kubova and Kiselev in 2010.

Personal information
- Full name: Dmitri Sergeyevich Kiselev
- Born: 10 August 1989 (age 37) Dalnekonstantinovo, Nizhny Novgorod Oblast, Soviet Union
- Height: 1.78 m (5 ft 10 in)

Figure skating career
- Country: Czech Republic
- Discipline: Ice dance
- Skating club: TJ Stadion Brno

Medal record
Representing Czech Republic
Czech Championships
Gold medal – first place	2012 Ostrava	Ice dance

Dmitri Sergeyevich Kiselev (Russian: Дмитрий Серге́евич Киселёв, born 10 August 1989) is a Russian ice dancer. Competing with Ekaterina Pushkash for Russia, he placed 6th at the 2009 World Junior Championships. He later competed with Gabriela Kubová for the Czech Republic, placing 18th at the 2012 European Championships.

== Career ==
In 2000, Kiselev teamed up with his maternal first cousin, Ekaterina Pushkash. They moved from Nizhny Novgorod to Moscow for training in 2002. Pushkash/Kiselev won silver medals at the 2008–2009 ISU Junior Grand Prix event in Gomel, Belarus and at the 2009 Russian Junior Championships. They finished sixth at the 2009 World Junior Championships and parted ways at the end of the season.

In 2009, Kiselev teamed up with Gabriela Kubová to compete for the Czech Republic. In their first two seasons together, they competed on the junior level and placed 14th at the 2010 World Junior Championships. Moving up to the senior level in the 2011–12 season, Kubová/Kiselev won the silver medal at the Pavel Roman Memorial and gold at the Czech national championships. They were assigned to the 2012 European Championships, placing 18th, and to the 2012 World Championships, placing 26th. Kiselev retired from competition in autumn 2012.

== Sanctions ==
In January 2023 Ukraine imposed sanctions on Dmitri Kiselev for promoting Russia during the 2022 Russian invasion of Ukraine.

== Programs ==
=== With Kubová ===
Season	Short dance	Free dance
2012–2013	Polka: Kytice z Uherskobrodska; Waltz: Valcik choreo. by Gabriela Hrázská	The Last Temptation of Christ by Peter Gabriel: With this Love; The Feeling Begins choreo. by Sergei Petukhov
2011–2012	Skip to the Bip by Brenda Boykin; Happy Brasilia by James Last choreo. by Gabriela Hrázská	Be Italian (from Nine) performed by Fergie choreo. by Sergei Petukhov
2010–2011	Waltz: Pardonne-moi ce caprice d'enfant; Tango: Parisien Tango by Mireille Mathieu	Shatritsa (Gypsy dance)
	Original dance	
2009–2010	Czech folk dance: Straznican - Rez Rez Rez; Este som sa neozenil	Luna by Alessandro Safina

=== With Pushkash ===
Season	Original dance	Free dance
2008–2009	Charleston: Unlucky Date (Russian: Неудачное свидание) by Alexander Tsfasman; Ragtime: Tiger Rag	Sheherazade by Nikolai Rimsky-Korsakov performed by Opera Babes

== Competitive highlights ==
=== With Kubová for the Czech Republic ===
Results
International
Event	2009–10	2010–11	2011–12
World Championships			26th
European Championships			18th
Nebelhorn Trophy			12th
NRW Trophy			10th
Ondrej Nepela Memorial			6th
Pavel Roman Memorial		4th J.	2nd
Toruń Cup			5th
International: Junior
World Junior Championships	14th		
JGP Czech Republic		9th	
JGP France		9th	
Mont Blanc Trophy		2nd J.	
National
Czech Championships	1st J.	2nd J.	1st
J. = Junior level; JGP = Junior Grand Prix

=== With Pushkash for Russia ===
Results
International: Junior
Event	2005–06	2006–07	2007–08	2008–09
Junior Worlds				6th
JGP Final				5th
JGP Belarus				2nd
JGP Bulgaria			4th	
JGP Estonia			6th	
JGP Great Britain				4th
JGP Taipei		7th		
National
Russian Jr. Champ.	9th	6th	5th	2nd
JGP = Junior Grand Prix
