= Kateřina Beránková =

Czech figure skater

Personal information
- Born: 12 October 1977 (age 48) Brno, Czechoslovakia
- Height: 1.63 m (5 ft 4 in)

Figure skating career
- Country: Czech Republic
- Partner: Otto Dlabola
- Skating club: TJ Stadion Brno
- Began skating: 1982
- Retired: 20 January 2005

Medal record
Czech Championships
Gold medal – first place	1995 Ústí nad Labem	Singles
Gold medal – first place	1998 Brno	Pairs
Gold medal – first place	1999 Karviná	Pairs
Gold medal – first place	2000 Mladá Boleslav	Pairs
Gold medal – first place	2002 Karviná	Pairs
Gold medal – first place	2003 Brno	Pairs
Gold medal – first place	2004 Hradec Králové	Pairs
Silver medal – second place	1994 Třinec	Singles
Silver medal – second place	1996 Třinec	Singles
Silver medal – second place	1997 Ústí nad Labem	Singles

Kateřina Beránková (born 12 October 1977 in Brno) is a Czech former pair skater and single skater. Initially, she competed in ladies' singles, finishing 10th at the 1995 European Championships. She switched to pair skating in 1997 and competed with Otto Dlabola, with whom she finished 8th at the 2002 Winter Olympics. On 20 January 2005 Beránková and Dlabola announced their retirement from competition.

== Programs ==
(with Dlabola)

Season	Short program	Free skating
2004–2005	Quitare Town, Era - Music Mix arranged by Martin Zezula	In the Pictures by Petr Hapka
2003–2004	Bandyta by Michał Lorenc	In the Pictures by Petr Hapka
2002–2003	Bandyta by Michał Lorenc	El Piano de America by Raúl Di Blasio
2001–2002	Pajaro Campana by Raúl Di Blasio	El Piano de America by Raúl Di Blasio
2000–2001	Concerto in F Minor by George Gershwin, performed by the Slovak Philharmonic Orchestra	The Mask of Zorro by James Horner

== Results ==
GP: Champions Series / Grand Prix

=== Pair skating with Otto Dlabola ===
Event	97–98	98–99	99–00	00–01	01–02	02–03	03–04
Winter Olympics	15th				8th		
World Championships	14th	12th	13th	12th	11th	11th	
European Championships	8th	7th	8th		5th	6th	5th
Czech Championships	1st	1st	1st		1st	1st	1st
GP Cup of Russia			6th		8th		8th
GP NHK Trophy						6th	
GP Skate Canada		6th					
Nebelhorn Trophy	7th						
Nepela Memorial	2nd	1st					
Karl Schäfer Memorial	3rd	2nd					
Skate Israel			2nd				

=== Women's singles ===
Event	91–92	93–94	94–95	95–96	96–97
World Championships		29th	15th		
European Championships			10th	14th	
Czech Championships		2nd	1st	2nd	2nd
Piruetten		10th			
Karl Schäfer Memorial	3rd				
