= Tomáš Janečko =

Czech figure skater

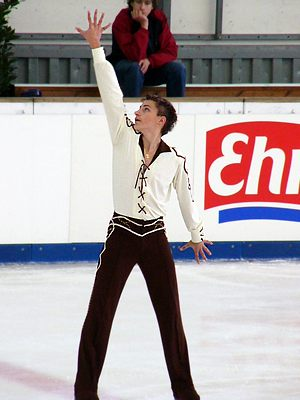
- Janečko in 2004.

Personal information
- Born: 24 December 1986 (age 39) Karviná, Czechoslovakia
- Height: 1.70 m (5 ft 7 in)

Figure skating career
- Country: Czech Republic
- Coach: Věra Kramná
- Skating club: Skating Club Orlová
- Began skating: 1996
- Retired: 2009

Medal record
Czech Championships
Gold medal – first place	2005 Ostrava	Singles
Bronze medal – third place	2007 Liberec	Singles

Tomáš Janečko (born 24 December 1986) is a Czech former figure skater. He is the 2005 Czech national champion and 2007 Czech national bronze medalist. He reached the free skate at the 2003 World Junior Championships.

== Programs ==
Season	Short program	Free skating
2004–05	The Matrix by Rob Dougan	Lord of the Dance by Ronan Hardiman
2003–04	An Almost Pink Story; Cutting of Roses	Lord of the Dance by Ronan Hardiman
2002–03	An Almost Pink Story; Cutting of Roses	Reach Out I'll be There; For your Eyes Only

== Competitive highlights ==
International
Event	01–02	02–03	03–04	04–05	05–06	06–07	07–08	08–09
Golden Spin								17th
Nebelhorn Trophy						14th		
Nepela Memorial						8th		
Schäfer Memorial				17th		13th		
International: Junior
Junior Worlds		17th		26th				
JGP Bulgaria					14th			
JGP Croatia			6th					
JGP Czech Republic			19th					
JGP Germany				9th				
JGP Poland					5th			
JGP Serbia				6th				
Gardena		8th J.	3rd J.					
Grand Prize SNP	4th J.							
Mladost Trophy	10th J.							
National
Czech Champ.	7th	4th		1st	WD	3rd	6th	
Czech Junior Champ.	4th	1st	1st					
J. = Junior level; WD = Withdrew
