= Veronika Dytrtová =

Czech figure skater

Personal information
- Other names: Veronika Dytrt
- Born: 18 June 1980 (age 46) Prague, Czechoslovakia
- Height: 1.60 m (5 ft 3 in)

Figure skating career
- Country: Czech Republic
- Coach: Vlasta Kopřivová, Steffi Ruttkies, Karin Gaiser
- Skating club: SKK Karvina
- Began skating: 1983
- Retired: 2002

Medal record
Czech Championships
Silver medal – second place	1999 Karnivá	Singles
Silver medal – second place	2002 Karviná	Singles
Bronze medal – third place	2000 Mladá Boleslav	Singles
Bronze medal – third place	2001 Mladá Boleslav	Singles

Veronika Dytrtová (born 18 June 1980) is a Czech former competitive figure skater. She is the 1998 Nebelhorn Trophy bronze medalist and a four-time Czech national medalist. In the first half of her career, she competed for Germany under the surname "Dytrt", winning the bronze medal at the 1997 German Championships. Her best ISU Championship results were 14th at the 1997 World Junior Championships and 17th at the 1997 European Championships. She began competing for the Czech Republic in the 1998–99 season. She is the sister of Anette Dytrt.

Her coaches included Steffi Ruttkies, Karin Gaiser, and Vlasta Kopřivová.

== Programs ==
Season	Short program	Free skating
1999–2000	Bianco / Rosso by Frédéric Chopin	Santorini by Yanni

== Competitive highlights ==
GP: Champions Series / Grand Prix

International
Event	93–94 (GER)	94–95 (GER)	95–96 (GER)	96–97 (GER)	97–98 (GER)	98–99 (CZE)	99–00 (CZE)	00–01 (CZE)	01–02 (CZE)
Worlds				WD		27th			
Europeans				17th		20th			
GP Cup of Russia						7th			
GP Skate Canada				WD					
Nebelhorn Trophy					5th	3rd		11th	
Nepela Memorial							6th	13th	
Schäfer Memorial							9th		
International: Junior
Junior Worlds		23rd		14th					
Blue Swords		6th J	9th J	3rd J					
Fischer Pokal			4th J						
St. Gervais				12th J					
Triglav Trophy			2nd J						
Ukrainian Souvenir		6th J							
National
Czech Champ.						2nd	3rd	3rd	2nd
German Champ.	3rd J	7th	5th	3rd					
J = Junior level; WD = Withdrew
