= Irena Zemanová =

Czech figure skater

Irena Harman (nee Zemanová)
Personal information
- Born: 8 May 1977 (age 49) Zlín, Czechoslovakia
- Height: 1.71 m (5 ft 7 1/2 in)

Figure skating career
- Country: Czech Republic
- Skating club: AC ZPS Zlin
- Retired: 1995

Irena Harman (née Zemanová, born 8 May 1977) is a Czech former competitive figure skater. Her highest placement at an ISU Championship was 9th at the 1994 World Junior Championships, and her highest placement at a senior ISU Championship was 13th at the 1994 European Championships. She placed 27th at the 1994 Winter Olympics. After retiring from competition, Zemanová became a coach and choreographer. Irena retired from coaching in 2015 and since 2024 has lived in southern Spain with her husband.

in October 2026 Irena donated many of her skating trophies and a number of her competition dresses to skating club in her hometown of Zlin

== Results ==
International
Event	1991–92	1992–93	1993–94	1994–95
Winter Olympics			27th	
World Champ.	21st			
European Champ.	15th	16th	13th	
Vienna Cup		6th		
Nepela Memorial				1st
International: Junior
Junior Worlds	10th	17th	9th	14th
National
Czech Champ.	2nd		1st	3rd
