= Martin Šimeček =

Czech ice dancer (born 1967)

Personal information
- Born: 29 July 1967 (age 58) Příbram, Czechoslovakia
- Height: 175 cm (5.74 ft)

Figure skating career
- Country: Czechoslovakia, Czech Republic
- Skating club: USK Praha
- Retired: 1998

Martin Šimeček (born 29 July 1967 in Příbram) is a Czech retired competitive ice dancer. With partner Kateřina Mrázová, he is a multiple Czech national champion. They placed 10th at the 1992 Winter Olympics (at which they competed for Czechoslovakia), 8th at the 1994 Winter Olympics, and 13th at the 1998 Winter Olympics. They retired from competitive skating following the 1998 World Figure Skating Championships.

Before teaming up with Mrázová, Šimeček competed with Andrea Juklova internationally for Czechoslovakia at the World Figure Skating Championships and European Figure Skating Championships. Their highest placement was 7th at the 1989 Europeans.

== Results ==
=== With Mrázová ===
International
Event	1990–91	1991–92	1992–93	1993–94	1994–95	1995–96	1996–97	1997–98
Olympics		10th		8th				13th
Worlds	12th	8th	8th	8th	9th	9th	13th	12th
Europeans	10th	9th	8th	8th	6th	7th	10th	14th
Lalique	3rd		4th	3rd	4th	6th		
Nations Cup		2nd		2nd				
NHK Trophy		4th			4th			5th
Skate America				2nd		5th	7th	
Skate Canada	3rd	3rd			6th			
Universiade			1st		2nd			
Piruetten				2nd				
National
Czech Champ.				1st	1st	1st		1st

=== With Juklová ===
International
Event	1986–1987	1987–1988	1988–1989
Worlds			10th
Europeans	16th	13th	7th
Skate America			8th
Golden Spin	2nd		
