= Czech Figure Skating Championships =

Recurring figure skating competition

- Status: Active
- Genre: National championships
- Frequency: Annual
- Country: Czech Republic
- Previous event: 2026 Four Nationals Championships
- Next event: 2027 Four Nationals Championships
- Organizer: Czech Figure Skating Association

The Czech Figure Skating Championships (Czech: Mistrovství České republiky v krasobruslení) are an annual figure skating competition organized by the Czech Figure Skating Association (Czech: Český krasobruslařský svaz) to crown the national champions of the Czech Republic. The first national championships to take place after the dissolution of Czechoslovakia were held in 1994 in Třinec. Currently, the senior-level championships, as well as the junior-level pair skating and ice dance championships, are held in conjunction with the skating federations of Hungary, Poland, and Slovakia as part of the Four Nationals Figure Skating Championships. Junior-level singles skaters compete in a separate competition that is exclusive to the Czech Republic.

Medals are awarded in men's singles, women's singles, pair skating, and ice dance at the senior and junior levels, although each discipline may not necessarily be held every year due to a lack of participants. Tomáš Verner currently holds the record for winning the most Czech Championship titles in men's singles (with ten), while Eliška Březinová holds the record in women's singles (with nine). Kateřina Beránková and Otto Dlabola hold the record in pair skating (with six), although Dlabola won another two titles with a different partner. Kamila Hájková and David Vincour hold the record in ice dance (with five).

== History ==
The First Czechoslovak Republic was established in 1918 after the dissolution of the Austro-Hungarian Empire, and the Skating Union of the Czechoslovak Republic was formed in 1922, which brought together both Czech and Slovak skaters. Skaters competed at the Czechoslovak Figure Skating Championships until the dissolution of Czechoslovakia, which occurred at the end of the day on 31 December 1992. However, the 1993 Czechoslovak Championships had actually taken place earlier that month. Therefore, the first national championships held in the newly-independent Czech Republic took place in 1994 in Třinec. Jaroslav Dostál won the men's event, Irena Zemanová won the women's event, Radka Kovaříková and René Novotný won the pairs event, and Kateřina Mrázová and Martin Šimeček won the ice dance event.

The Czech and Slovak skating federations ran independent national championships until the 2006–07 season, when the two associations joined their championships together as one event. The inaugural Czech and Slovak Figure Skating Championships were held in Liberec in the Czech Republic. Tomáš Verner of the Czech Republic won the men's event, while Igor Macypura was the highest ranked Slovak men's singles skater. Ivana Reitmayerová of Slovakia won the women's event, while Nella Simaová was the highest ranked Czech women's singles skater. Kamila Hájková and David Vincour of the Czech Republic were the only entrants in the ice dance event. The Czech Republic and Slovakia alternated as hosts for the combined championships until the 2008–09 season, when Poland joined and the Three Nationals Figure Skating Championships were officially formed. Since Hungary joined during the 2013–14 season, the event has been known as the Four Nationals Figure Skating Championships. The four nations rotate as hosts, while skaters from the four countries compete together and the results are then split at the end of the competition to form national podiums.

== Senior medalists ==
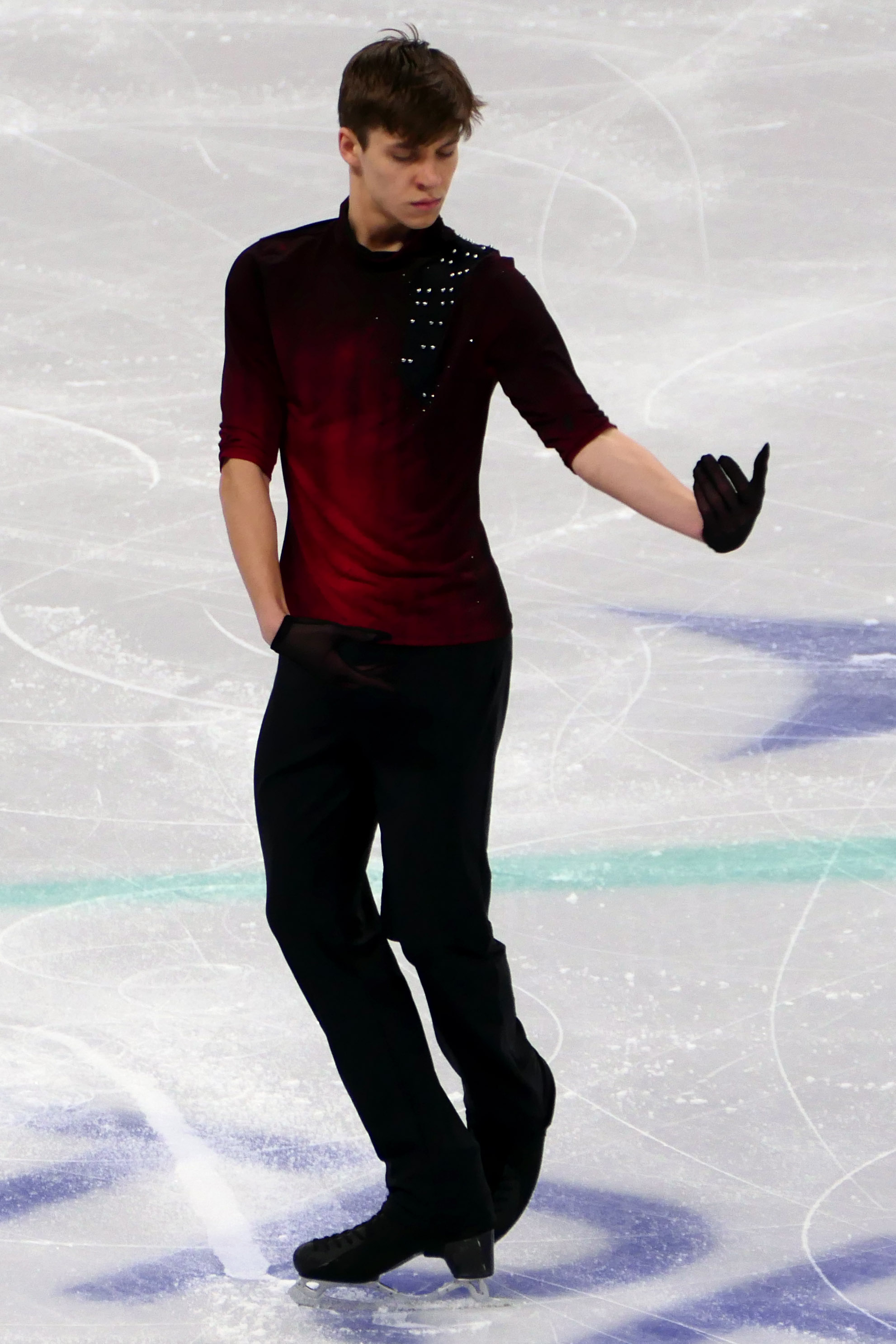
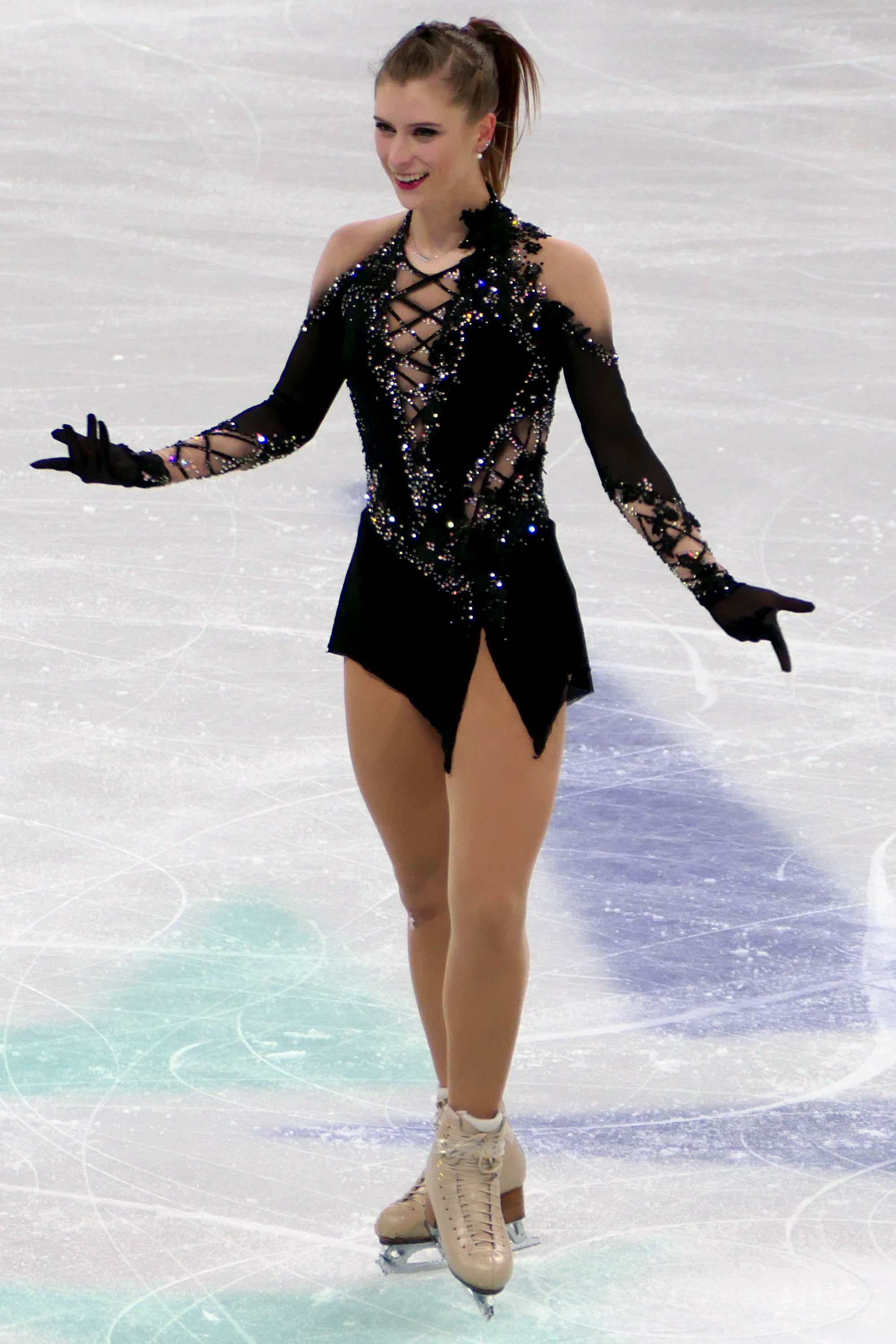
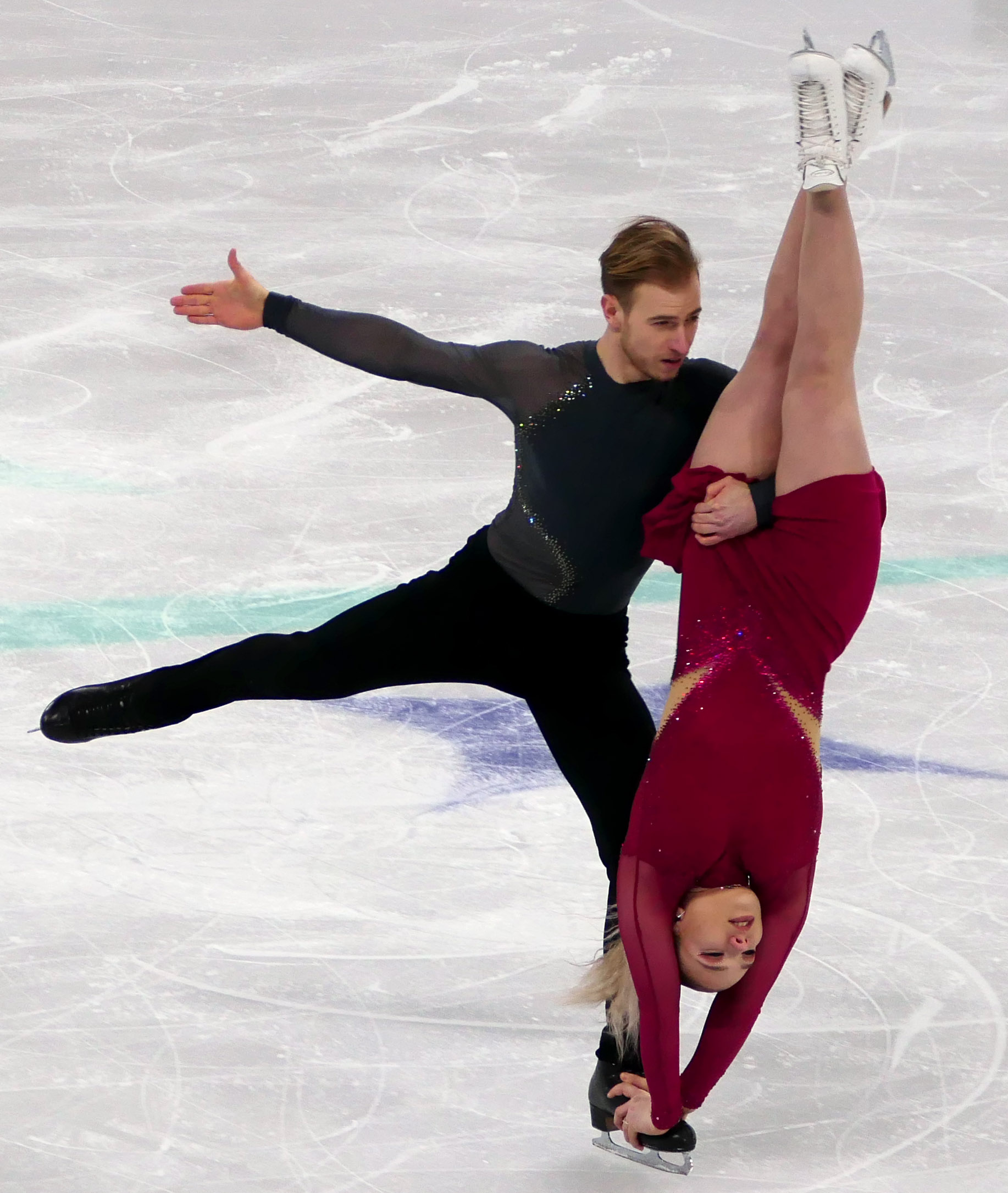
From left to right: Georgii Reshtenko, three-time Czech champion in men's singles; Eliška Březinová, eight-time Czech champion in women's singles; and Natálie Taschlerová and Filip Taschler, three-time Czech champions in ice dance

=== Men's singles ===
Senior men's event medalists
Year	Location	Gold	Silver	Bronze	Ref.
1994	Třinec	Jaroslav Dostál	Martin Diviš	No other competitors	
1995	Ústí nad Labem	Jaroslav Suchý	Radek Horák	Karel Nekola	
1996	Třinec	Radek Horák	Jaroslav Suchý	Karel Nekola	
1997	Ústí nad Labem	Karel Nekola	Radek Horák	Petr Jaroš	
1998	Brno	Radek Horák	Petr Jaroš	Karel Nekola	
1999	Karviná	Lukáš Rakowski	Radek Horák	Karel Nekola	
2000	Mladá Boleslav	Lukáš Rakowski	Radek Horák	Tomáš Šrom	
2001	Mladá Boleslav	Lukáš Rakowski	Tomáš Verner	Tomáš Šrom	
2002	Karviná	Tomáš Verner	Lukáš Rakowski	Radek Horák	
2003	Brno	Tomáš Verner	Lukáš Rakowski	Ondřej Hotárek	
2004	Hradec Králové	Tomáš Verner	Michal Matloch	Ondřej Hotárek	
2005	Ostrava	Tomáš Janečko	Michal Matloch	Lukáš Rakowski	
2006	České Budějovice	Tomáš Verner	Pavel Kaška	Lukáš Rakowski	
2007	Liberec	Tomáš Verner	Pavel Kaška	Tomáš Janečko	
2008	(Slovakia) Trenčín	Tomáš Verner	Michal Březina	Pavel Kaška	
2009	Třinec	Pavel Kaška	Michal Matloch	Petr Bidař	
2010	(Poland) Cieszyn	Michal Březina	Tomáš Verner	Pavel Kaška	
2011	(Slovakia) Žilina	Tomáš Verner	Michal Březina	Pavel Kaška	
2012	Ostrava	Tomáš Verner	Michal Březina	Pavel Kaška	
2013	(Poland) Cieszyn	Tomáš Verner	Pavel Kaška	Marco Zakouřil	
2014	(Slovakia) Bratislava	Tomáš Verner	Michal Březina	Petr Coufal	
2015	(Hungary) Budapest	Michal Březina	Petr Coufal	Pavel Kaška	
2016	Třinec	Michal Březina	Jiří Bělohradský	Petr Kotlařík	
2017	(Poland) Katowice	Jiří Bělohradský	Matyáš Bělohradský	Tomáš Kupka	
2018	(Slovakia) Košice	Jiří Bělohradský	Matyáš Bělohradský	Petr Kotlařík	
2019	(Hungary) Budapest	Matyáš Bělohradský	Petr Kotlařík	Daniel Mrázek	
2020	Ostrava	Michal Březina	Matyáš Bělohradský	Jiří Bělohradský	
2021	(Poland) Cieszyn	Michal Březina	Jiří Bělohradský	Georgii Reshtenko	
2022	(Slovakia) Spišská Nová Ves	Matyáš Bělohradský	Georgii Reshtenko	No other competitors	
2023	(Hungary) Budapest	Petr Kotlařík	Georgii Reshtenko	No other competitors	
2024	Turnov	Georgii Reshtenko	Filip Ščerba	No other competitors	
2025	(Poland) Cieszyn	Georgii Reshtenko	Filip Ščerba	Petr Kotlařík	
2026	(Slovakia) Prešov	Georgii Reshtenko	Tadeáš Václavík	Jan Valtera	

=== Women's singles ===
Senior women's event medalists
Year	Location	Gold	Silver	Bronze	Ref.
1994	Třinec	Irena Zemanová	Kateřina Beránková	Lenka Kulovaná	
1995	Ústí nad Labem	Kateřina Beránková	Lenka Kulovaná	Irena Zemanová	
1996	Třinec	Lenka Kulovaná	Kateřina Beránková	Karolína Hofferová	
1997	Ústí nad Labem	Lenka Kulovaná	Kateřina Beránková	Kateřina Blohonová	
1998	Brno	Lenka Kulovaná	Kateřina Blohonová	Veronika Skalická	
1999	Karviná	Annette Dytrtová	Veronika Dytrtová	Petra Lehká	
2000	Mladá Boleslav	Eva Chudá	Lenka Šeniglová	Veronika Dytrtová	
2001	Mladá Boleslav	Lucie Krausová	Lenka Šeniglová	Veronika Dytrtová	
2002	Karviná	Lucie Krausová	Veronika Dytrtová	Lenka Šeniglová	
2003	Brno	Lucie Krausová	Petra Lukáčíková	Marta Klímová	
2004	Hradec Králové	Petra Lukáčíková	Ivana Hudziecová	Dina Babická	
2005	Ostrava	Petra Lukáčíková	Pavla Skotalová	Ivana Hudziecová	
2006	České Budějovice	Ivana Hudziecová	Petra Lukáčíková	Hana Charyparová	
2007	Liberec	Ivana Hudziecová	Nella Simaová	Klára Nováková	
2008	(Slovakia) Trenčín	Nella Simaová	Hana Charyparová	Klára Nováková	
2009	Třinec	Nella Simaová	Ivana Hudziecová	Martina Boček	
2010	(Poland) Cieszyn	Martina Boček	Ivana Hudziecová	Nella Simaová	
2011	(Slovakia) Žilina	Martina Boček	Kristina Kostková	Eliška Březinová	
2012	Ostrava	Eliška Březinová	Klára Světlíková	Nastasia Lobachevskaya	
2013	(Poland) Cieszyn	Laura Raszyková	Klára Světlíková	Jana Coufalová	
2014	(Slovakia) Bratislava	Eliška Březinová	Elizaveta Ukolova	Jana Coufalová	
2015	(Hungary) Budapest	Eliška Březinová	Elizaveta Ukolova	Jana Coufalová	
2016	Třinec	Eliška Březinová	Michaela Lucie Hanzlíková	Anna Dušková	
2017	(Poland) Katowice	Michaela Lucie Hanzlíková	Eliška Březinová	Natálie Kratěnová	
2018	(Slovakia) Košice	Eliška Březinová	Dahyun Ko	Michaela Lucie Hanzlíková	
2019	(Hungary) Budapest	Eliška Březinová	Klára Štěpánová	Aneta Janiczková	
2020	Ostrava	Eliška Březinová	Nikola Rychtaříková	Kateřina Fričová	
2021	(Poland) Cieszyn	Eliška Březinová	Nikola Rychtaříková	Oluša Gajdošová	
2022	(Slovakia) Spišská Nová Ves	Eliška Březinová	Nikola Rychtaříková	Ellen Slavíčková	
2023	(Hungary) Budapest	Barbora Vránková	Eliška Březinová	Nikola Rychtaříková	
2024	Turnov	Barbora Vránková	Eliška Březinová	Michaela Vrašťáková	
2025	(Poland) Cieszyn	Michaela Vraštáková	Eliška Březinová	Barbora Vránková	
2026	(Slovakia) Prešov	Barbora Vránková	Michaela Vrašťáková	Eliška Březinová	

=== Pairs ===
Senior pairs event medalists
Year	Location	Gold	Silver	Bronze	Ref.
1994	Třinec	Radka Kovaříková; René Novotný	Veronika Joukalová; Otto Dlabola	No other competitors	
1995	Ústí nad Labem	Veronika Joukalová; Otto Dlabola	Kristýna Matěnová; Martin Diviš	No other competitors	
1996	Třinec	Veronika Joukalová; Otto Dlabola	No other competitors		
1997	Ústí nad Labem	Pavla Ročková; Martin Diviš	No other competitors		
1998	Brno	Kateřina Beránková; Otto Dlabola	No other competitors		
1999	Karviná	Kateřina Beránková; Otto Dlabola	No other competitors		
2000	Mladá Boleslav	Kateřina Beránková; Otto Dlabola	Michaela Krutská; Marek Sedlmajer	No other competitors	
2001	Mladá Boleslav	Michaela Krutská; Marek Sedlmajer	Radka Zlatohlávková; Karel Štefl	No other competitors	
2002	Karviná	Kateřina Beránková; Otto Dlabola	Veronika Havlíčková; Karel Štefl	No other competitors	
2003	Brno	Kateřina Beránková; Otto Dlabola	Andrea Vargová; Marek Sedlmajer	Adéla Zilvarová; Miroslav Verner	
2004	Hradec Králové	Kateřina Beránková; Otto Dlabola	Veronika Havlíčková; Karel Štefl	No other competitors	
2005	Ostrava	No pairs competitors			
2006	České Budějovice	Olga Prokuronova; Karel Štefl	No other competitors		
2007–10	No pairs competitors				
2011	(Slovakia) Žilina	Klára Kadlecová; Petr Bidař	Alexandra Herbríková; Alexander Zaboev	No other competitors	
2012	Ostrava	Alexandra Herbríková; Rudy Halmaert	No other competitors		
2013–19	No pairs competitors				
2020	Ostrava	Jelizaveta Žuková; Martin Bidař	No other competitors		
2021	(Poland) Cieszyn	Jelizaveta Žuková; Martin Bidař	No other competitors		
2022	(Slovakia) Spišská Nová Ves	No pairs competitors			
2023	(Hungary) Budapest	Federica Simioli; Alessandro Zarbo	No other competitors		
2024	Turnov	Barbora Kucianová; Martin Bidař	No other competitors		
2025	(Poland) Cieszyn	No pairs competitors			
2026	(Slovakia) Prešov	Anna Valesi; Martin Bidař	No other competitors		

=== Ice dance ===
Senior ice dance event medalists
Year	Location	Gold	Silver	Bronze	Ref.
1994	Třinec	Kateřina Mrázová; Martin Šimeček	Radmila Chroboková; Milan Brzý	Lucie Jeřábková; Martin Andrašovský	
1995	Ústí nad Labem	Kateřina Mrázová; Martin Šimeček	Šárka Vondrková; Lukáš Král	No other competitors	
1996	Třinec	Kateřina Mrázová; Martin Šimeček	Šárka Vondrková; Lukáš Král	Radmila Chroboková; David Blažek	
1997	Ústí nad Labem	Šárka Vondrková; Lukáš Král	Alena Kramplová; Jan Nerad	Monika Kramná; Petr Janák	
1998	Brno	Kateřina Mrázová; Martin Šimeček	Šárka Vondrková; Lukáš Král	Alena Kramplová; Jan Nerad	
1999	Karviná	Gabriela Hrázská; Jiří Procházka	Kateřina Kovalová; David Szurman	Martina Kvarčáková; Ota Jandejsek	
2000	Mladá Boleslav	Kateřina Kovalová; David Szurman	Martina Kvarcáková; Ota Jandejsek	No other competitors	
2001	Mladá Boleslav	Kateřina Kovalová; David Szurman	Veronika Morávková; Jiří Procházka	Martina Kvarčáková; Ota Jandejsek	
2002	Karviná	Veronika Morávková; Jiří Procházka	Kateřina Kovalová; David Szurman	No other competitors	
2003	Brno	Veronika Morávková; Jiří Procházka	Petra Pachlová; Petr Knoth	No other competitors	
2004	Hradec Králové	Petra Pachlová; Petr Knoth	Diana Janošťáková; Jiří Procházka	No other competitors	
2005	Ostrava	Diana Janošťáková; Jiří Procházka	Petra Pachlová; Petr Knoth	No other competitors	
2006	České Budějovice	Kamila Hájková; David Vincour	No other competitors		
2007	Liberec	Kamila Hájková; David Vincour	No other competitors		
2008	(Slovakia) Trenčín	Kamila Hájková; David Vincour	Lucie Myslivečková; Matěj Novák	No other competitors	
2009	Třinec	Kamila Hájková; David Vincour	Lucie Myslivečková; Matěj Novák	No other competitors	
2010	(Poland) Cieszyn	Kamila Hájková; David Vincour	No other competitors		
2011	(Slovakia) Žilina	Lucie Myslivečková; Matěj Novák	No other competitors		
2012	Ostrava	Gabriela Kubová; Dmitri Kiselev	Lucie Myslivečková; Neil Brown	Karolína Procházková; Michal Češka	
2013	(Poland) Cieszyn	Lucie Myslivečková; Neil Brown	Gabriela Kubová; Matěj Novák	No other competitors	
2014	(Slovakia) Bratislava	Lucie Myslivečková; Neil Brown	No other competitors		
2015	(Hungary) Budapest	Cortney Mansour; Michal Češka	No other competitors		
2016	Třinec	No ice dance competitors			
2017	(Poland) Katowice	Cortney Mansour; Michal Češka	Nicole Kuzmichová; Alexandr Sinicyn	No other competitors	
2018	(Slovakia) Košice	Cortney Mansour; Michal Češka	No other competitors		
2019–21	No ice dance competitors				
2022	(Slovakia) Spišská Nová Ves	Natálie Taschlerová; Filip Taschler	No other competitors		
2023	(Hungary) Budapest	Natálie Taschlerová; Filip Taschler	Denisa Cimlová; Joti Polizoakis	No other competitors	
2024	Turnov	Kateřina Mrázková; Daniel Mrázek	No other competitors		
2025	(Poland) Cieszyn	Natálie Taschlerová; Filip Taschler	Kateřina Mrázková; Daniel Mrázek	No other competitors	
2026	(Slovakia) Prešov	Kateřina Mrázková; Daniel Mrázek	Natálie Taschlerová; Filip Taschler	No other competitors	

== Junior medalists ==
=== Men's singles ===
Junior men's event medalists
Year	Location	Gold	Silver	Bronze	Ref.
2002	Děčín	Michal Matloch	Lukáš Rakowski	Ondřej Hotárek	
2003	Příbram	Tomáš Janečko	Ondřej Hotárek	Jan Matejka	
2004	Hradec Králové	Tomáš Janečko	Pavel Kaška	Miroslav Verner	
2005	Ostrava	Michal Březina	Jakub Šafránek	Michal Řehůřek	
2006	České Budějovice	Michal Březina	Petr Bidař	Michal Řehůřek	
2007	Liberec	Michal Březina	Petr Bidař	Miroslav Dvořák	
2008	České Budějovice	Petr Bidař	Petr Coufal	Jiří Vašíček	
2009	Brno	Petr Coufal	Jiří Vašíček	Miroslav Dvořák	
2010	Brno	Petr Bidař	Petr Coufal	Jiří Vašíček	
2011	České Budějovice	Petr Coufal	Marco Zakouřil	Miroslav Dvořák	
2012	Pardubice	Petr Coufal	Tomáš Kupka	Marco Zakouřil	
2013	Příbram	Petr Coufal	Tomáš Kupka	Jan Kurník	
2014	Třinec	Petr Coufal	Tomáš Kupka	Jan Kurník	
2015	Plzeň	Jiří Bělohradský	Petr Kotlařík	Martin Bidař	
2016	Plzeň	Jiří Bělohradský	Petr Kotlařík	Matyáš Bělohradský	
2017	Náchod	Petr Kotlařík	Jiří Bělohradský	Radek Jakubka	
2018	Liberec	Petr Kotlařík	Radek Jakubka	Matyáš Bělohradský	
2019	Náchod	Matyáš Bělohradský	Filip Ščerba	Daniel Mrázek	
2020	Litoměřice	Filip Ščerba	Matyáš Bělohradský	Georgii Reshtenko	
2021	No competition due to the COVID-19 pandemic				
2022	Český Těšín	Georgii Reshtenko	Damian Malczyk	Sebastian Malczyk	
2023	Strakonice	Damian Malczyk	Jindřich Klement	Vojtěch Warisch	
2024	Mariánské Lázně	Tadeáš Václavík	Jan Valtera	No other competitors	
2025	Břeclav	Jakub Tykal	Tadeáš Václavík	Marian Klus	
2026	České Budějovice	Jakub Tykal	Tadeáš Václavík	Jan Valtera	

=== Women's singles ===
Junior women's event medalists
Year	Location	Gold	Silver	Bronze	Ref.
2002	Děčín	Lucie Krausová	Monika Králová	Jana Sýkorová	
2003	Příbram	Veronika Benesová	Pavla Skotalová	Petra Lukaciková	
2004	Hradec Králové	Jana Sýkorová	Zuzana Wojtovičová	Pavla Skotalová	
2005	Ostrava	Nella Simaová	Petra Vaumundová	Zuzana Wojtovičová	
2006	České Budějovice	Nella Simaová	Klara Noviková	Zuzana Wojtovičová	
2007	Liberec	Barbara Albrechtová	Eva Čiklová	Tereza Světlíková	
2008	České Budějovice	Barbora Švédová	Nikola Procházková	Klára Zoubková	
2009	Brno	Barbora Švédová	Hana Vaverková	Alexandra Herbríková	
2010	Brno	Kristína Košíková	Barbora Švédová	Eliška Březinová	
2011	České Budějovice	Veronika Paličková	Adéla Jelínková	Daria Zaychenko	
2012	Pardubice	Elizaveta Ukolova	Eliška Březinová	Jana Coufalová	
2013	Příbram	Elizaveta Ukolova	Klára Světlíková	Jana Coufalová	
2014	Třinec	Anna Dušková	Aneta Janiczková	Klára Světlíková	
2015	Plzeň	Anna Dušková	Elizaveta Ukolova	Jana Coufalová	
2016	Plzeň	Elizaveta Ukolova	Michaela Lucie Hanzlíková	Klára Světlíková	
2017	Náchod	Michaela Lucie Hanzlíková	Klára Štěpánová	Elizabeth Harsh	
2018	Liberec	Dahyun Ko	Kateřina Fričová	Nikola Rychtaříková	
2019	Náchod	Nikola Rychtaříková	Kateřina Fričová	Aneta Janiczková	
2020	Litoměřice	Thea Reichmacherová	Kateřina Fričová	Klára Štěpánová	
2021	No competition due to the COVID-19 pandemic				
2022	Český Těšín	Barbora Vránková	Adéla Vallová	Michaela Vrašťáková	
2023	Strakonice	Barbora Tykalová	Kateřina Hanušová	Adéla Vallová	
2024	Mariánské Lázně	Jana Horčičková	Barbora Tykalová	Kateřina Hanušová	
2025	Břeclav	Jana Horčičková	Barbora Tykalová	Michaela Málková	
2026	České Budějovice	Jana Horčičková	Kateřina Hanušová	Eliška Kubáňová	

=== Pairs ===
Junior pairs event medalists
Year	Location	Gold	Silver	Bronze	Ref.
2002	Děčín	Veronika Havlíčková; Karel Štefl	Adéla Zilvarová; Miroslav Verner	No other competitors	
2003	Příbram	Veronika Havlíčková; Karel Štefl	No other competitors		
2004	Hradec Králové	No junior pairs competitors			
2005	Ostrava	Klára Zoubková; Miroslav Verner	No other competitors		
2006–07	No junior pairs competitors				
2008	České Budějovice	Andrea Hollerová; Jakub Šafránek	No other competitors		
2009	Třinec	Alexandra Herbríková; Lukáš Ovčáček	No other competitors		
2010	Brno	Klára Kadlecová; Petr Bidař	No other competitors		
2011–13	No junior pairs competitors				
2014	(Slovakia) Bratislava	Anna Dušková; Martin Bidař	No other competitors		
2015	(Hungary) Budapest	Anna Dušková; Martin Bidař	No other competitors		
2016–19	No junior pairs competitors				
2020	Ostrava	Lucie Novotná; Mykyta Husakov	No other competitors		
2021	(Poland) Cieszyn	Barbora Kucianová; Lukáš Vochozka	No other competitors		
2022	(Slovakia) Spišská Nová Ves	Barbora Kucianová; Lukáš Vochozka	No other competitors		
2023	(Hungary) Budapest	Barbora Kucianová; Lukáš Vochozka	No other competitors		
2024	Turnov	Debora Anna Cohen; Lukáš Vochozka	No other competitors		
2025	(Poland) Cieszyn	Johanka Žilková; Matyáš Becerra	Alžběta Kvíderová; Jindřich Klement	No other competitors	
2026	(Slovakia) Prešov	Johanka Žilková; Matyáš Becerra	Debora Anna Cohen; Lukáš Vochozka	Alžběta Kvíderová; Jindřich Klement	

=== Ice dance ===
Junior ice dance event medalists
Year	Location	Gold	Silver	Bronze	Ref.
2002	Děčín	Petra Pachlová; Petr Knoth	Lucie Kadlčáková; Hynek Bílek	Simona Kuvíková; Jirí Klowersa	
2003	Příbram	Petra Pachlová; Petr Knoth	Kamila Hajkova; David Vincour	Barbora Silná; Martin Šubrt	
2004	Hradec Králové	No junior ice dance competitors			
2005	Ostrava	Kamila Hájková; David Vincour	No other competitors		
2006	České Budějovice	Lucie Myslivečková; Matěj Novák	Barbora Heroldová; Zdeněk Pazdera	Kristina Vamberská; Jakub Vambersky	
2007	Liberec	Lucie Myslivečková; Matěj Novák	No other competitors		
2008	České Budějovice	Lucie Myslivečková; Matěj Novák	Gabriela Kubová; Petr Seknička	Karolína Procházková; Michal Češka	
2009	Třinec	Karolína Procházková; Michal Češka	Gabriela Kubová; Petr Seknička	No other competitors	
2010	(Poland) Cieszyn	Gabriela Kubová; Dmitri Kiselev	No other competitors		
2011	(Slovakia) Žilina	Karolína Procházková; Michal Češka	Gabriela Kubová; Dmitri Kiselev	Jana Čejková; Alexandr Sinicyn	
2012	Ostrava	Jana Čejková; Alexandr Sinicyn	Kateřina Koníčková; Matěj Lang	Mariya Ukolova; Jaroslav Brtek	
2013	(Poland) Cieszyn	Karolína Procházková; Michal Češka	Jana Čejková; Alexandr Sinicyn	Kateřina Koníčková; Matěj Lang	
2014	(Slovakia) Bratislava	Cortney Mansour; Michal Češka	Kateřina Koníčková; Matěj Lang	Štěpanka Tůmová; Gregory Brissaud	
2015	(Hungary) Budapest	Nicole Kuzmichová; Alexandr Sinicyn	Kateřina Koníčková; Matěj Lang	No other competitors	
2016	Třinec	Nicole Kuzmichová; Alexandr Sinicyn	No other competitors		
2017	(Poland) Katowice	Lucy Burton; Thomas Ingall	No other competitors		
2018	(Slovakia) Košice	Natálie Taschlerová; Filip Taschler	No other competitors		
2019	(Hungary) Budapest	Natálie Taschlerová; Filip Taschler	Elisabeta Kořínková; Tomáš Moravec	No other competitors	
2020	Ostrava	Natálie Taschlerová; Filip Taschler	Denisa Cimlová; Vilém Hlavsa	Elisabeta Kořínková; Tomáš Moravec	
2021	(Poland) Cieszyn	Denisa Cimlová; Vilém Hlavsa	Adéla Pejchová; Filip Mencl	Barbora Zelená; Jáchym Novák	
2022	(Slovakia) Spišská Nová Ves	Denisa Cimlová; Vilém Hlavsa	Kateřina Mrázková; Daniel Mrázek	Eliška Žáková; Filip Mencl	
2023	(Hungary) Budapest	Kateřina Mrázková; Daniel Mrázek	Natálie Blaasová; Filip Blaas	Andrea Pšurná; Jáchym Novák	
2024	Turnov	Eliška Žáková; Filip Mencl	Natálie Blaasová; Filip Blaass	Lauren Audrey Baťková; Jacob Yang	
2025	(Poland) Cieszyn	Eliška Žáková; Filip Mencl	Natálie Blaasová; Filip Blaass	Diane Sznajder; Jáchym Novák	
2026	(Slovakia) Prešov	Diane Sznajder; Jáchym Novák	Eliška Žáková; Filip Mencl	Kristýna Štanclová; Karel Kostroň	

== Records ==
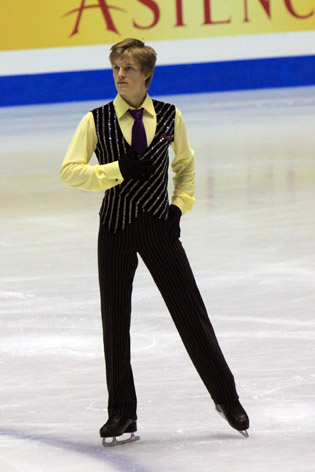
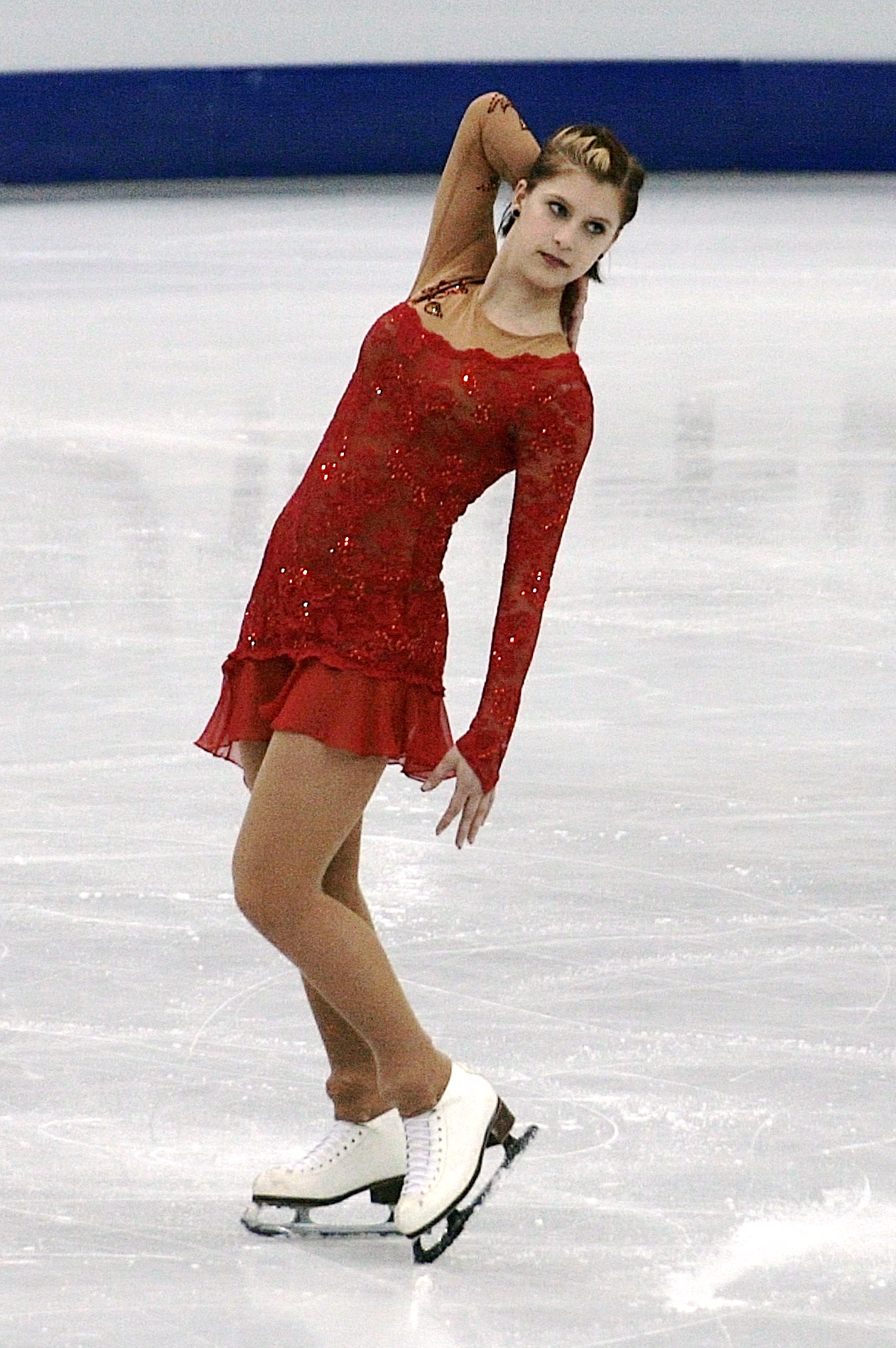
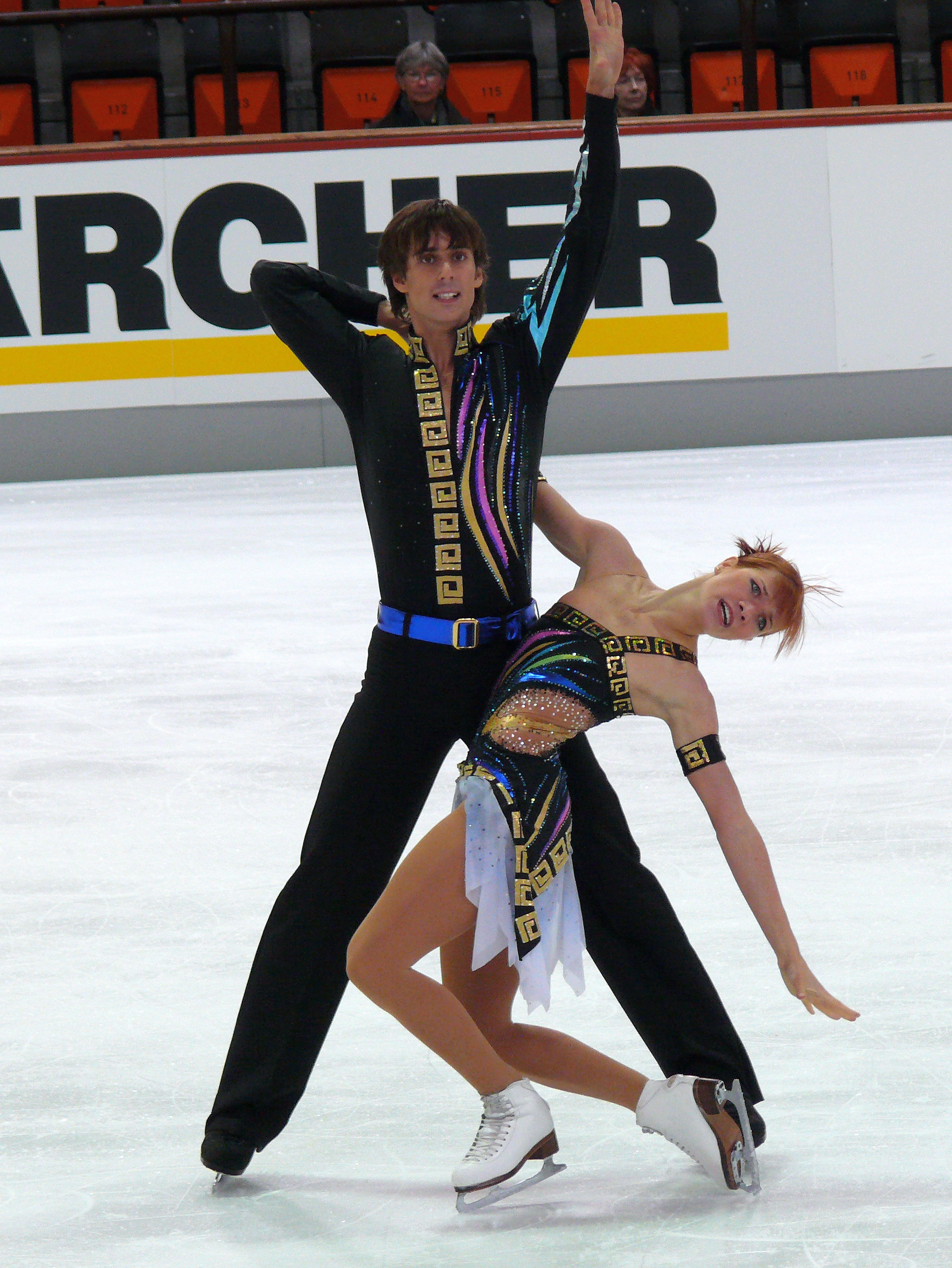
From left to right: Tomáš Verner won ten Czech Championship titles in men's singles; Eliška Březinová won nine Czech Championship titles in women's singles; and Kamila Hájková and David Vincour won five Czech Championship titles in ice dance.

Records
Discipline	Most championship titles			
Discipline	Skater(s)	No.	Years	Ref.
Men's singles	Tomáš Verner	10	2002–04; 2006–08; 2011–14	
Women's singles	Eliška Březinová	9	2012; 2014–16; 2018–22	
Pairs	Kateřina Beránková; Otto Dlabola	6	1998–2000; 2002–04	
Pairs	Otto Dlabola; (Note: Otto Dlabola won two championship titles while partnered with Veronika Joukalová (1995–96), and six with Kateřina Beránková (1998–2000; 2002–04).)	8	1995–96; 1998–2000; 2002–04	
Ice dance	Kamila Hájková; David Vincour	5	2006–10	
