= Lukáš Král =

Czech former ice dancer (born 1976)

Personal information
- Born: 8 November 1976 (age 49) Olomouc, Czechoslovakia
- Height: 1.85 m (6 ft 1 in)

Figure skating career
- Country: Czech Republic
- Began skating: 1983
- Retired: 1998

Lukáš Král (born 8 November 1976) is a Czech former ice dancer. With Šárka Vondrková, he is the 1997 Czech national champion. They placed ninth at the 1995 World Junior Championships in Budapest, 15th at the 1996 European Championships in Sofia, and 22nd at the 1996 World Championships in Edmonton.

== Programs ==
(with Vondrková)

Season	Original dance	Free dance
1996–1997		Checkin' In by Wes Heusel; Sentimental Journey by Brown, Homer, and Green; Leap Frog by Garland and Gorday all performed by Les Brown and his Band of Renown

== Results ==
GP: Champions Series (Grand Prix)

with Vondrková

International
Event	91–92	92–93	93–94	94–95	95–96	96–97	97–98
World Champ.				27th	22nd	23rd	
European Champ.					15th	20th	
GP Cup of Russia							8th
GP Skate America							8th
Czech Skate					11th		4th
Finlandia Trophy							7th
Schäfer Memorial					8th		12th
Nebelhorn Trophy					10th		
Basler Cup				9th			
Centennial on Ice					10th		
International: Junior
World Junior Champ.		14th	15th	9th			
P. Roman Memorial		1st J	3rd J				
Grand Prize SNP	7th J						
Autumn Trophy		9th J					
National
Czech Champ.			1st J	2nd	2nd	1st	2nd
J = Junior level
