= Lukáš Rakowski =

Czech figure skater

Personal information
- Born: 8 September 1982 (age 44) Třinec, Czechoslovakia
- Height: 1.79 m (5 ft 10 1/2 in)

Figure skating career
- Country: Czech Republic
- Skating club: LR Cosmetic Ostrava
- Began skating: 1988
- Retired: 2006

Medal record
Czech Championships
Gold medal – first place	1999 Karviná	Singles
Gold medal – first place	2000 Mladá Boleslav	Singles
Gold medal – first place	2001 Mladá Boleslav	Singles
Silver medal – second place	2002 Karviná	Singles
Silver medal – second place	2003 Brno	Singles
Bronze medal – third place	2005 Ostrava	Singles
Bronze medal – third place	2006 České Budějovice	Singles

Lukáš Rakowski (born 8 September 1982) is a Czech former competitive figure skater. He won two silver medals on the ISU Junior Grand Prix series and three Czech national senior titles (1999–2001). He reached the free skate at five ISU Championships, achieving his best result, 10th, at the 1998 World Junior Championships.

== Programs ==
Season	Short program	Free skating
2004–05	Kill Bill	Desperado
2001–02	Jumping Jack by Big Bad Voodoo Daddy	Hamlet; Henry V by Patrick Doyle; Here on Earth by Andrea Morricone London Philharmonic Orchestra
2000–01	Jumping Jack by Big Bad Voodoo Daddy	Xotica by René Dupéré

== Results ==
JGP: Junior Series / Junior Grand Prix

Event	96–97	97–98	98–99	99–00	00–01	01–02	02–03	03–04	04–05	05–06
World Championships			35th	41st						
European Championships			23rd	26th	31st					
Czech Championships	1st J	1st J	1st	1st	1st	2nd	2nd	4th	3rd	3rd
Golden Spin of Zagreb						16th	8th	19th		
Nebelhorn Trophy					14th	10th				
Nepela Memorial				8th	11th			8th		8th
Karl Schäfer Memorial								8th	16th	
Winter Universiade							13th		15th	
World Junior Championships	14th	10th	15th	11th						
Junior Grand Prix Final			7th							
JGP Bulgaria						6th				
JGP Czech Republic				2nd	5th	4th				
JGP France		14th								
JGP Germany		4th	5th		9th					
JGP Slovakia			2nd							
JGP Sweden				8th						
