= Pavel Kaška =

Czech figure skater

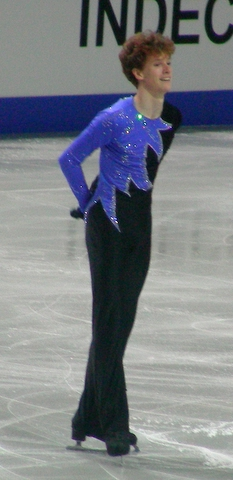
- Kaška at the 2007 European Championships

Personal information
- Born: 25 May 1988 (age 38) Prague, Czechoslovakia
- Height: 1.88 m (6 ft 2 in)

Figure skating career
- Country: Czech Republic
- Coach: Vlasta Kopřivová
- Skating club: USK Praha
- Began skating: 1995

Medal record
Czech Championships
Gold medal – first place	2009 Třinec	Singles
Silver medal – second place	2006 České Budějovice	Singles
Silver medal – second place	2007 Liberec	Singles
Silver medal – second place	2013 Cieszyn	Singles
Bronze medal – third place	2008 Trenčín	Singles
Bronze medal – third place	2010 Cieszyn	Singles
Bronze medal – third place	2011 Žilina	Singles
Bronze medal – third place	2012 Ostrava	Singles
Bronze medal – third place	2015 Budapest	Singles

Pavel Kaška (born 25 May 1988) is a Czech figure skater. He is the 2012 Merano Cup silver medalist, 2010 NRW Trophy bronze medalist, and 2009 Czech national champion.

Kaška was coached by Miloslav Man from the age of ten until about 2010. Since 2011, he is coached by Vlasta Kopřivová.

== Programs ==
Season	Short program	Free skating
2011–2013	The Addams Family	New World Concerto by Antonín Dvořák performed by Maksim Mrvica
2009–2010	The Nutcracker by Pyotr Tchaikovsky performed by Bond	The Constant Gardener by Alberto Iglesias
2007–2008	The Nutcracker by Pyotr Tchaikovsky performed by Bond	Sinbad: Legend of the Seven Seas by Harry Gregson-Williams
2006–2007	Don Juan DeMarco by Michael Kamen	Sinbad: Legend of the Seven Seas by Harry Gregson-Williams
2005–2006	Don Juan DeMarco by Michael Kamen	Battlefield Earth by Elia Cmíral; Pirates of the Caribbean by Klaus Badelt
2003–2004	Lord of the Dance by Ronan Hardiman	Riverdance by Bill Whelan

== Competitive highlights ==
GP: Grand Prix; JGP: Junior Grand Prix

International
Event	02–03	03–04	04–05	05–06	06–07	07–08	08–09	09–10	10–11	11–12	12–13	13–14	14–15
Worlds						27th		26th					
Europeans					19th					26th	WD		17th
GP Skate Canada						7th							
Finlandia						4th							
Merano Cup									5th	5th	2nd	9th	
NRW Trophy									3rd				
Nepela Trophy				9th		5th	4th	10th			6th	11th	
Universiade							19th		10th		19th		12th
International: Junior
Junior Worlds				20th									
JGP Final				8th									
JGP Croatia				5th									
JGP Czech Rep.		13th			3rd								
JGP Hungary			13th										
JGP Romania					5th								
JGP Slovakia				9th									
JGP Slovenia		9th											
JGP Ukraine			13th										
Golden Bear		1st J.											
Grand Prize SNP	5th J.	1st J.											
National
Czech Champ.		2nd J	4th	2nd	2nd	3rd	1st	3rd	3rd	3rd	2nd	4th	3rd
WD: Withdrew; Levels: N. = Novice, J. = Junior
