= Kateřina Mrázová (figure skater) =

Czech ice dancer

Personal information
- Born: 9 July 1972 (age 53) Brno, Czechoslovakia
- Height: 1.66 m (5 ft 5 1/2 in)

Figure skating career
- Country: Czech Republic
- Skating club: USK Praha
- Retired: 1998

Kateřina Mrázová (born 9 July 1972 in Brno) is a Czech retired competitive ice dancer. With partner Martin Šimeček, she is a multiple Czech national champion. They placed 10th at the 1992 Winter Olympics (at which they competed for Czechoslovakia), 8th at the 1994 Winter Olympics, and 13th at the 1998 Winter Olympics. They retired from competitive skating following the 1998 World Figure Skating Championships.

== Results ==
(ice dance with Martin Šimeček)

International
Event	1990–91	1991–92	1992–93	1993–94	1994–95	1995–96	1996–97	1997–98
Olympics		10th		8th				13th
Worlds	12th	8th	8th	8th	9th	9th	13th	12th
Europeans	10th	9th	8th	8th	6th	7th	10th	14th
Lalique	3rd		4th	3rd	4th	6th		
Nations Cup		2nd		2nd				
NHK Trophy		4th			4th			5th
Skate America				2nd		5th	7th	
Skate Canada	3rd	3rd			6th			
Universiade			1st		2nd			
Piruetten				2nd				
National
Czech Champ.				1st	1st	1st		1st
