= Veronika Morávková =

Czech ice dancer (born 1983)

Personal information
- Born: January 22, 1983 (age 43) Pardubice
- Home town: Pardubice
- Height: 1.65 m (5 ft 5 in)

Figure skating career
- Country: Czech Republic
- Discipline: Ice dance
- Skating club: TJ Stadion Brno
- Began skating: 1989

Medal record
Czech Championships
Gold medal – first place	2002 Karviná	Ice dance
Gold medal – first place	2003 Brno	Ice dance
Silver medal – second place	2001 Mladá Boleslav	Ice dance

Veronika Morávková (born January 22, 1983, in Pardubice) is a Czech ice dancer. She is the 2002 and 2003 Czech champion with partner Jiří Procházka.

== Competitive highlights ==
(with Procházka)

Event	2000–01	2001–02	2002–03
World Championships		18th	16th
European Championships		16th	13th
Czech Championships	2nd	1st	1st
Nebelhorn Trophy		8th	5th
Ondrej Nepela Memorial		2nd	2nd
Karl Schäfer Memorial		5th	
Bofrost Cup on Ice			7th
