= Matěj Novák =

Czech ice dancer (born 1989)

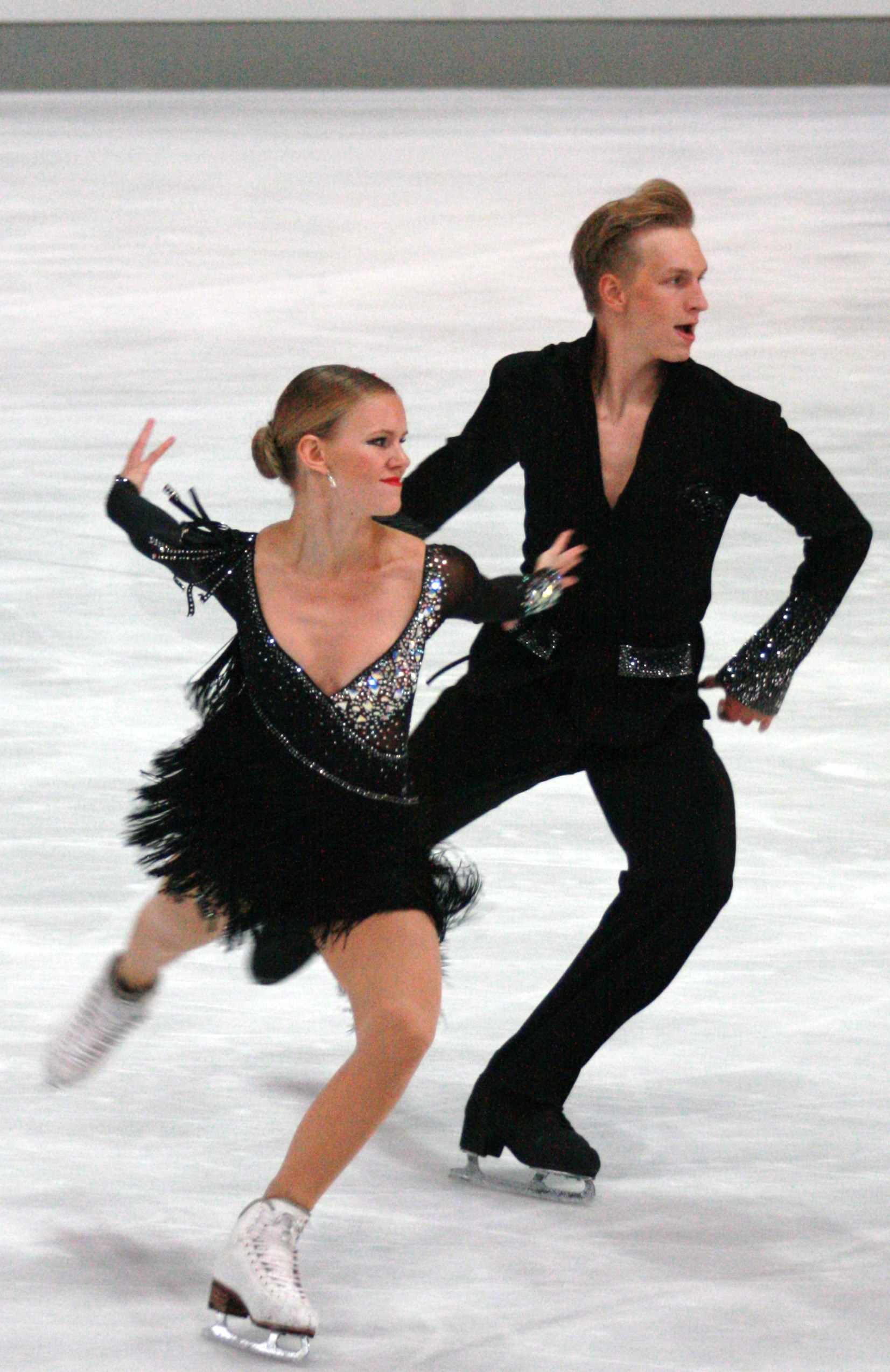
- Kubová / Novák in 2013

Personal information
- Born: 6 November 1989 (age 36) Pardubice, Czechoslovakia
- Height: 1.82 m (6 ft 0 in)

Figure skating career
- Country: Czech Republic
- Discipline: Ice dance
- Partner: Gabriela Kubová
- Coach: Rostislav Sinicyn, Natalia Karamysheva
- Skating club: USK Praha
- Began skating: 1993

Medal record
Czech Championships
Gold medal – first place	2011 Žilina	Ice dance
Silver medal – second place	2008 Trenčín	Ice dance
Silver medal – second place	2009 Třinec	Ice dance
Silver medal – second place	2013 Cieszyn	Ice dance

Matěj Novák (born 6 November 1989) is a Czech former competitive ice dancer. With former partner Lucie Myslivečková, he is the 2010 Golden Spin of Zagreb champion and the 2011 Czech national champion. He currently competes with Gabriela Kubová.

== Career ==
Myslivečkova and Novák won a silver and bronze on the Junior Grand Prix circuit. They finished as high as 8th at Junior Worlds in 2009 and debuted at senior Worlds in the same season. They were 21st at the 2009 World Championships.

Myslivečkova and Novák made their senior Grand Prix debut in the 2009–2010 season, finishing 7th at the Cup of Russia and 9th at the NHK Trophy. They moved up to 16th at Worlds. During the 2010–2011 season, they won silver at the Ondrej Nepela Memorial, finished 6th at the NHK Trophy and 5th at the Cup of Russia. They won their first international title at the 2010 Golden Spin of Zagreb. Following the 2010–11 season, Novak decided to retire from competitive skating to do ballroom dancing.

In 2012, Novák decided to return to ice dancing, teaming up with Gabriela Kubová.

== Programs ==
=== With Kubová ===
Season	Short dance	Free dance
2013–2014	Vive Le Swing by In-Grid; You Are the One For Me; Soy lo que me das	Tango medley

=== With Myslivečková ===
Season	Short dance	Free dance
2010–2011	Waltz: Battagliero; Quickstep by Alexander's Rag Time Band	Let My People Go; Money; Jessica Rabbit; Venus
	Original dance	
2009–2010	Finnish polka	Blues for Klook by Eddy Louis
2008–2009	Blues: Harlem Nocturne; Quickstep: Let Yourself Go	Endgame (from Chess (musical)) by Björn Ulvaeus
2007–2008	Finnish dance: Lehty; Leva's Polka by Loituma	La Notte Eterna by Emma Shapplin
2006–2007	Tango Taemstvi by Daniel Landa; Cellblock Tango (from Chicago musical)	Once Upon a Time in Mexico by Maxime Rodriguez; Wild Time
2005–2006	Cha Cha: Banga, Banga by Buena Vista Social Club; Rhumba: Mi Thierra by Edwin Bonilla; Samba: Vive, Vive! by Puerto Rican Power	Whenever, Whenever by Shakira; Sing for the Moment; Objection by Shakira

== Competitive highlights ==
=== With Kubová ===
Results
International
Event	2012–13	2013–14
World Championships		27th
Nebelhorn Trophy		16th
NRW Trophy		7th
Ondrej Nepela Memorial		7th
Volvo Open Cup	7th	
National
Czech Championships	2nd	WD

=== With Myslivečková ===
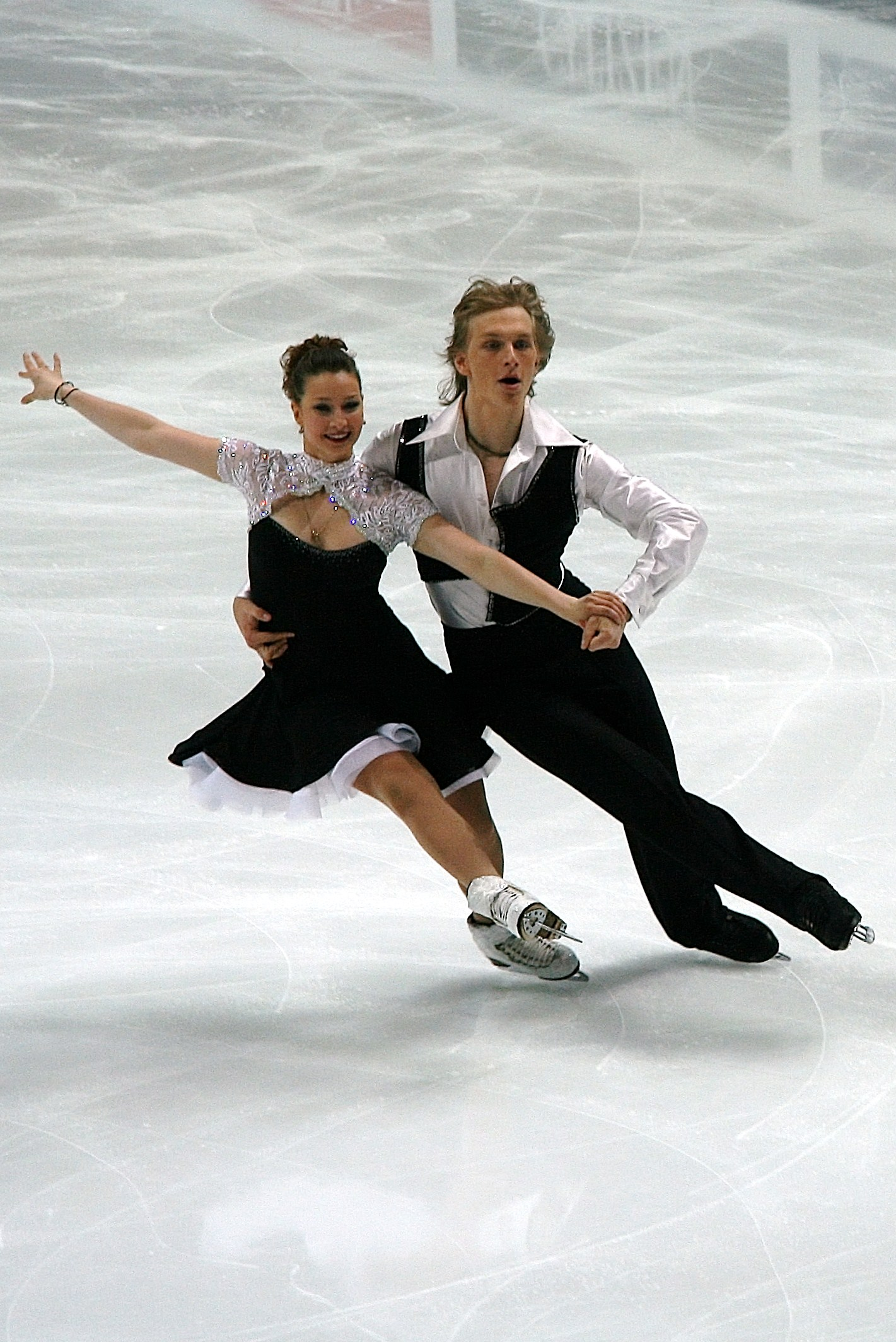
Myslivečková and Novák at the 2011 World Championships

International
Event	2005–06	2006–07	2007–08	2008–09	2009–10	2010–11
Worlds				21st	16th	22nd
Europeans						10th
GP Cup of Russia					7th	5th
GP NHK Trophy					9th	6th
Golden Spin						1st
Karl Schäfer				4th		
Nebelhorn			11th		6th	7th
Ondrej Nepela						2nd
Pavel Roman	5th		3rd			
International: Junior
Junior Worlds	19th	18th	12th	8th		
JGP Bulgaria	15th					
JGP Czech Rep.				4th		
JGP Estonia			4th			
JGP France				3rd		
JGP Great Britain			2nd			
National
Czech Champ.			2nd	2nd		1st
Czech Junior Champ.	1st J	1st J	1st			
