= Klára Kadlecová =

Czech pair skater (born 1995)

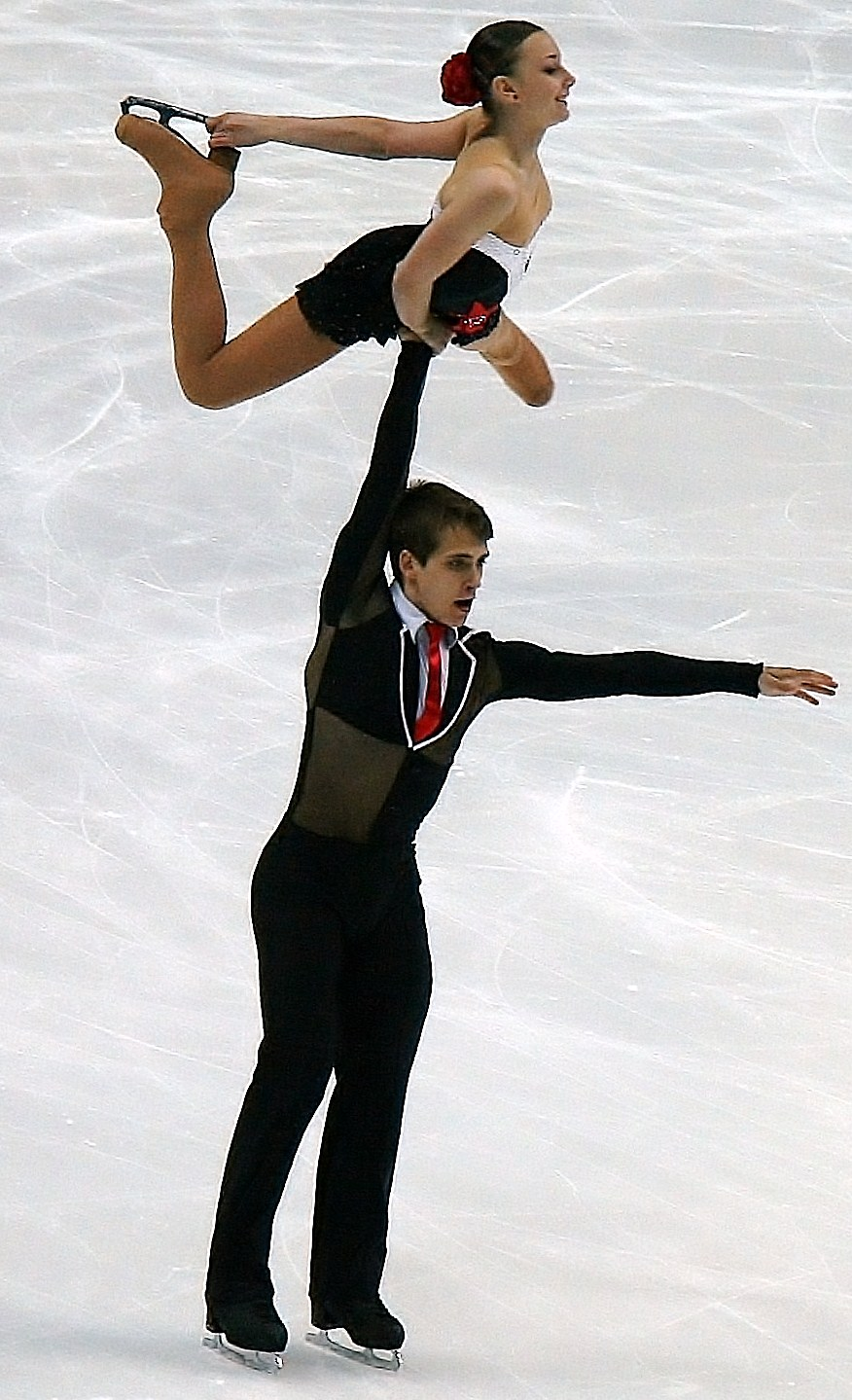
- Kadlecová/Bidař in 2011.

Personal information
- Born: 4 April 1995 (age 31) Prague, Czech Republic
- Height: 1.52 m (5 ft 0 in)

Figure skating career
- Country: Czech Republic
- Skating club: USK Praha
- Began skating: 1999
- Retired: 2012

Medal record
Czech Championships
Gold medal – first place	2011 Žilina	Pairs

Klára Kadlecová (born 4 April 1995) is a Czech former competitive pair skater. Competing with Petr Bidař, she placed 7th at the 2011 European Championships in Bern and 15th at the 2011 World Championships in Moscow. In January 2012, Kadlecová confirmed that they had parted ways and she was searching for a new partner.

== Programs ==
(with Bidař)

Season	Short program	Free skating
2011–2012	Flamenco by The Princesses of Violin	The Phantom of the Opera by Andrew Lloyd Webber
2010–2011	Dangerous Tango by The Princesses of Violin	Nostradamus by Maksim Mrvica
2009–2010	Libertango performed by Bond	Casablanca by Max Steiner

== Competitive highlights ==
GP: Grand Prix; JGP: Junior Grand Prix

(with Bidař)

International
Event	2009–10	2010–11	2011–12
Worlds		15th	
Europeans		7th	
GP Trophée Eric Bompard		6th	
GP Cup of China			8th
Cup of Nice		4th	7th
Ice Challenge		6th	
International: Junior
Junior Worlds	14th	8th	
JGP Austria		7th	8th
JGP Estonia			5th
JGP United Kingdom		7th	
Ice Challenge	1st		
National
Czech Champ.	1st J	1st	
J. = Junior level
