= Radka Fišarová =

Czech singer

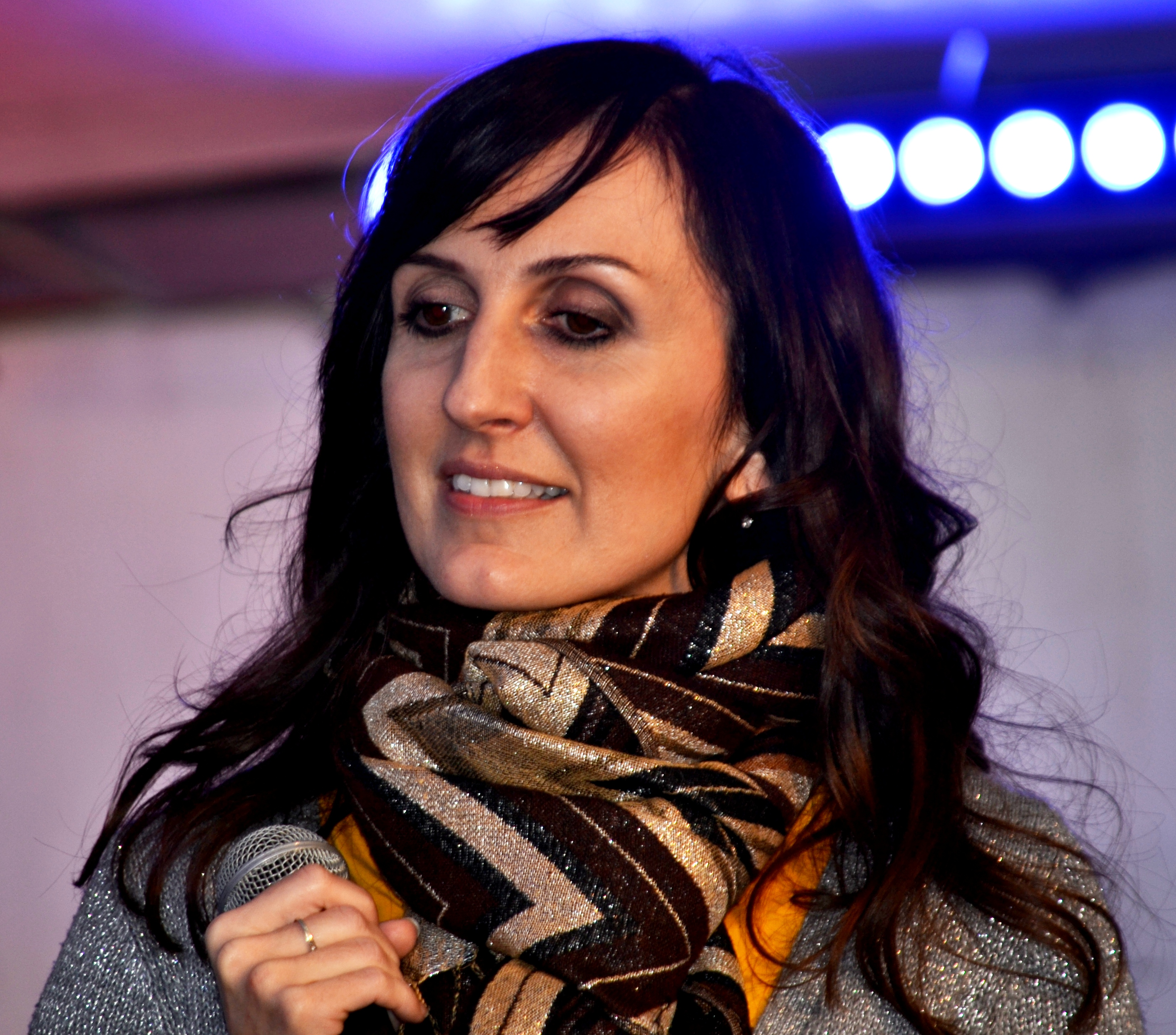
- Fišarová in 2013

Background information
- Born: Radka Fišarová; 19 December 1977 (age 48)
- Origin: Prague, Czechoslovakia
- Occupation: Singer
- Years active: 1995–present
- Label: Lenkow
- Website: radkafisarova.cz

Radka Fišarová (born 19 December 1977) is a Czech singer. In 2002, she performed the title role in the famous Czech musical, Kleopatra, at Prague's Broadway Theatre. She performed the Czech language versions of the songs in the 2012 Disney film Brave soundtrack.

== Discography ==
=== Studio albums ===
- 2003: Pod pařížským nebem
- 2008: Paris..Paris..
- 2011: Pocta Edith Piaf
