= Diana Janošťáková =

Czech figure skater

Personal information
- Born: 29 September 1984 (age 42) Bratislava, Czechoslovakia
- Height: 1.64 m (5 ft 5 in)

Figure skating career
- Country: Czech Republic (ice dance); Slovakia (singles)
- Discipline: Ice dance
- Skating club: TJ Stadion Brno
- Began skating: 1990

Medal record
Representing Czech Republic
Czech Championships
Gold medal – first place	2005 Ostrava	Ice dance
Silver medal – second place	2004 Hradec Králové	Ice dance

Diana Janošťáková (born 29 September 1984) is a former competitive figure skater. She represented Slovakia in ladies' singles through 2002. In 2003, she began competing with Jiří Procházka in ice dancing for the Czech Republic. They became the 2005 Czech national champions.

== Programs ==
=== Ice dance with Procházka ===
Season	Short dance	Free dance
2004–2005	Slow foxtrot: I want to be Loved by You; Quickstep: Friend Like Me	Notre-Dame de Paris by Riccardo Cocciante
2003–2004	Blues: Bensonhurst Blues by Oscar Benton; Jive	The Wild Party by Michael John LaChiusa

=== Single skating ===
Season	Short program	Free skating
2000–2001	The Blue Danube by Johann Strauss II	Fiddler on the Roof by Jerry Bock

== Competitive highlights ==
GP: Grand Prix; JGP: Junior Grand Prix

=== Ice dance with Procházka for the Czech Republic ===
International
Event	2003–04	2004–05
World Championships	25th	
European Championships		19th
GP Cup of Russia		10th
GP Skate Canada		10th
Golden Spin of Zagreb		1st
Pavel Roman Memorial		1st
Winter Universiade		8th
International
Czech Championships	2nd	1st

=== Single skating for Slovakia ===
International
Event	98–99	99–00	00–01	01–02
Golden Spin of Zagreb			12th	
Nepela Memorial			9th	12th
Schäfer Memorial			13th	
International: Junior
World Junior Champ.		35th		
JGP Czech Republic			12th	
JGP Sweden				16th
National
Slovak Championships	1st J	1st	2nd	2nd
