= Ivana Buzková =

Czech figure skater

Personal information
- Other names: Ivana Hudziecová
- Born: 31 March 1985 (age 41) Český Těšín, Czechoslovakia
- Height: 1.66 m (5 ft 5 in)

Figure skating career
- Country: Czech Republic
- Skating club: HCO Třinec-Kraso
- Began skating: 1991
- Retired: 2010

Medal record
Czech Championships
Gold medal – first place	2006 České Budějovice	Singles
Gold medal – first place	2007 Liberec	Singles
Silver medal – second place	2004 Hradec Králové	Singles
Silver medal – second place	2009 Třinec	Singles
Silver medal – second place	2010 Cieszyn	Singles
Bronze medal – third place	2005 Ostrava	Singles

Ivana Buzková (née: Hudziecová; born 31 March 1985) is a Czech former competitive figure skater. She is a two-time (2006, 2007) Czech national champion.

== Programs ==
Season	Short program	Free skating
2006–07	Great TV Theme by Pearson - K.P.M. Music Ltd.	Music by Yanni
2005–06	Great TV Theme by Pearson - K.P.M. Music Ltd.	Ola Espana

== Results ==
International
Event	99–00	00–01	01–02	02–03	03–04	04–05	05–06	06–07	08–09	09–10
Worlds								35th		
Europeans							26th	33rd		
Golden Spin								7th	14th	
Grand Prize SNP			10th							
Nepela Memorial							16th		4th	
Schäfer Memorial								15th		
Universiade						23rd				
International: Junior
Junior Worlds	31st									
Golden Bear	4th J									
Grand Prize SNP	15th J									
National
Czech Champ.	1st J	5th	5th	6th	2nd	3rd	1st	1st	2nd	2nd
J = Junior level
