= Petr Bidař =

Czech pair skater (born 1991)

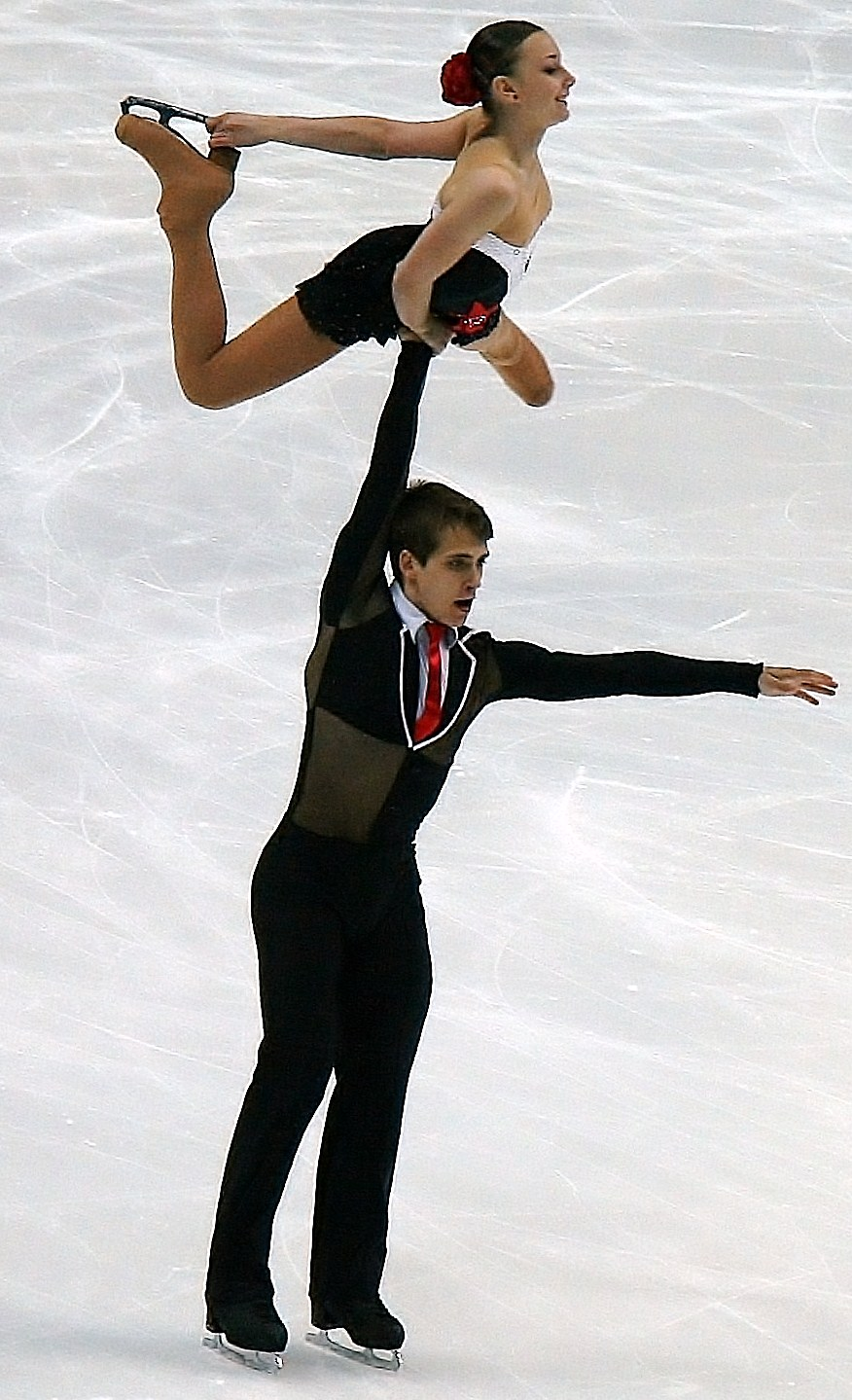
- Kadlecová/Bidař in 2011.

Personal information
- Born: 18 March 1991 (age 35) České Budějovice, Czechoslovakia
- Height: 1.72 m (5 ft 7 1/2 in)

Figure skating career
- Country: Czech Republic
- Skating club: BK České Budějovice
- Began skating: 1995
- Retired: 2012

Medal record
Czech Championships
Bronze medal – third place	2009 Třinec	Singles

Petr Bidař (born 18 March 1991) is a Czech former competitive pair skater. Competing with Klára Kadlecová, he placed 7th at the 2011 European Championships in Bern and 15th at the 2011 World Championships in Moscow. In January 2012, Bidař stated that they had parted ways and he would continue his career with Martina Boček. He injured his shoulder in training during the summer of 2012 and retired from competition that year following Boček's decision not to return to pairs after a fall.

His younger brother, Martin Bidař, is also a pair skater.

== Programs ==
=== Pair skating with Kadlecová ===
Season	Short program	Free skating
2011–2012	Flamenco by The Princesses of Violin	The Phantom of the Opera by Andrew Lloyd Webber
2010–2011	Dangerous Tango by The Princesses of Violin	Nostradamus by Maksim Mrvica
2009–2010	Libertango performed by Bond	Casablanca by Max Steiner

=== Single skating ===
Season	Short program	Free skating
2008–2010	The Notebook by Aaron Zigman	Kill Bill
2006–2007	The Mask	Medley by Queen

== Competitive highlights ==
GP: Grand Prix; JGP: Junior Grand Prix

=== Pair skating with Kadlecová ===
International
Event	2009–10	2010–11	2011–12
Worlds		15th	
Europeans		7th	
GP Trophée Eric Bompard		6th	
GP Cup of China			8th
Cup of Nice		4th	7th
Ice Challenge		6th	
International: Junior
Junior Worlds	14th	8th	
JGP Austria		7th	8th
JGP Estonia			5th
JGP United Kingdom		7th	
Ice Challenge	1st		
National
Czech Champ.	1st J	1st	
J. = Junior level

=== Single skating ===
International
Event	2005–06	2006–07	2007–08	2008–09	2009–10
Golden Spin				20th	
Nepela Memorial				12th	
International: Junior
Junior Worlds					23rd
JGP Croatia			11th		
JGP Estonia	18th				
JGP France				13th	
JGP Hungary					6th
JGP Norway		13th			
JGP Romania			9th		
JGP Turkey					12th
EYOF		10th			
Bavarian Open			1st J.		
Gardena	7th J.				
National
Czech Champ.			5th	3rd	
Czech Junior Champ.	2nd	2nd	1st		1st
J. = Junior level
