= 2014 Four Nationals Figure Skating Championships =

Figure skating competition

2014 Four National Figure Skating Championships
- Type: National championships
- Date: December 20 – 22, 2013
- Season: 2013–14
- Location: Bratislava, Slovakia
- Host: Slovak Figure Skating Association
- Venue: Ondrej Nepela Ice Rink
- Previous: 2013 Three National Championships; 2013 Hungarian Championships
- Next: 2015 Four National Championships

The 2014 Four National Figure Skating Championships included the Czech Republic, Slovakia, Poland, and Hungary. The event was hosted by the Slovak association in Bratislava from 20 to 22 December 2013. Medals were awarded in the disciplines of men's singles, ladies' singles, pair skating, and ice dancing on the senior level. Some junior and novice-level events were also held.

The results were split by country; the three highest-placing skaters from each country in each discipline formed their national podiums. The results were among the criteria used to determine international assignments. It was the sixth consecutive season that the Czech Republic, Slovakia, and Poland held their national championships together and the first season that Hungary participated.

== Medals summary ==
=== Czech Republic ===
| Discipline | Gold | Silver | Bronze |
|---|---|---|---|
| Men | Tomáš Verner | Michal Březina | Petr Coufal |
| Ladies | Eliška Březinová | Elizaveta Ukolova | Jana Coufalová |
| Ice dancing | Lucie Myslivečková / Neil Brown | —N/a | |

=== Slovakia ===
| Discipline | Gold | Silver | Bronze |
|---|---|---|---|
| Men | Marco Klepoch | —N/a | |
| Ladies | Bronislava Dobiášová | Monika Simančíková | Alexandra Kunová |
| Ice dancing | Federica Testa / Lukáš Csölley | —N/a | |

=== Poland ===
| Discipline | Gold | Silver | Bronze |
|---|---|---|---|
| Men | Maciej Cieplucha | Krzysztof Gała | Kamil Dymowski |
| Ladies | Agata Kryger | Alexandra Kamieniecki | Marcelina Lech |
| Pairs | Magdalena Klatka / Radosław Chruściński | —N/a | |
| Ice dancing | Justyna Plutowska / Peter Gerber | —N/a | |

=== Hungary ===
| Discipline | Gold | Silver | Bronze |
|---|---|---|---|
| Men | Márton Markó | Kristóf Forgó | No other competitors |
| Ladies | Ivett Tóth | Bernadett Szakacs | Eszter Szombathelyi |
| Ice dancing | Dóra Turóczi / Balázs Major | —N/a | |

== Junior medalists ==
=== Czech Republic ===
| Discipline | Gold | Silver | Bronze |
|---|---|---|---|
| Ice dancing | Cortney Mansour / Michal Češka | Kateřina Koníčková / Matěj Lang | Štěpanka Tůmová / Gregory Brissaud |

=== Poland ===
| Discipline | Gold | Silver | Bronze |
|---|---|---|---|
| Ice dancing | Beatrice Tomczak / Damian Bińkowski | Natalia Kaliszek / Yaroslav Kurbakov | Joanna Zając / Cezary Zawadzki |

=== Hungary ===
| Discipline | Gold | Silver | Bronze |
|---|---|---|---|
| Ice dancing | Carolina Moscheni / Ádám Lukács | Reka Staudt / Mate Staudt | Beatrix Pipek / Jozsef Kalman |

== Senior results ==
=== Men ===
| Rank | Name | Nation | Total points | SP | | FS | |
|---|---|---|---|---|---|---|---|
| 1 | Tomáš Verner | Czech Republic | 237.40 | 1 | 85.22 | 1 | 152.18 |
| 2 | Michal Březina | Czech Republic | 209.40 | 2 | 72.81 | 2 | 136.59 |
| 3 | Maciej Cieplucha | Poland | 204.05 | 3 | 67.47 | 3 | 136.58 |
| 4 | Petr Coufal | Czech Republic | 191.13 | 4 | 60.87 | 4 | 130.26 |
| 5 | Pavel Kaška | Czech Republic | 169.22 | 5 | 55.91 | 5 | 113.31 |
| 6 | Krzysztof Gała | Poland | 154.88 | 6 | 52.22 | 6 | 102.66 |
| 7 | Tomáš Kupka | Czech Republic | 149.00 | 7 | 50.75 | 7 | 98.25 |
| 8 | Marco Klepoch | Slovakia | 136.82 | 11 | 45.96 | 8 | 90.86 |
| 9 | Márton Markó | Hungary | 136.65 | 9 | 49.01 | 9 | 87.64 |
| 10 | Kristóf Forgó | Hungary | 133.54 | 8 | 50.52 | 12 | 83.02 |
| 11 | Marco Zakouřil | Czech Republic | 132.04 | 10 | 46.18 | 10 | 85.86 |
| 12 | Kamil Dymowski | Poland | 122.68 | 12 | 45.57 | 13 | 77.11 |
| 13 | Michael Neuman | Sweden | 120.16 | 13 | 44.42 | 14 | 75.74 |
| 14 | Wiktor Witkowski | Poland | 118.53 | 16 | 34.07 | 11 | 84.46 |
| 15 | Jiří Bělohradský | Czech Republic | 115.79 | 15 | 40.74 | 15 | 75.05 |
| 16 | Martin Krhovjak | Czech Republic | 113.29 | 14 | 41.16 | 16 | 72.13 |

=== Ladies ===
| Rank | Name | Nation | Total points | SP | | FS | |
|---|---|---|---|---|---|---|---|
| 1 | Eliška Březinová | Czech Republic | 145.24 | 2 | 48.38 | 1 | 96.86 |
| 2 | Elizaveta Ukolova | Czech Republic | 142.92 | 1 | 51.45 | 2 | 91.47 |
| 3 | Agata Kryger | Poland | 131.91 | 8 | 43.28 | 3 | 88.63 |
| 4 | Ivett Tóth | Hungary | 131.07 | 5 | 44.11 | 4 | 86.96 |
| 5 | Jana Coufalová | Czech Republic | 123.50 | 10 | 41.86 | 5 | 81.64 |
| 6 | Klára Světlíková | Czech Republic | 121.18 | 11 | 41.60 | 6 | 79.58 |
| 7 | Bronislava Dobiášová | Slovakia | 120.27 | 9 | 42.36 | 7 | 77.91 |
| 8 | Monika Simančíková | Slovakia | 118.74 | 3 | 48.07 | 11 | 70.67 |
| 9 | Alexandra Kamieniecki | Poland | 116.14 | 4 | 44.91 | 10 | 71.23 |
| 10 | Alexandra Kunová | Slovakia | 115.83 | 7 | 43.37 | 8 | 72.46 |
| 11 | Nicole Rajičová | Slovakia | 115.58 | 6 | 43.41 | 9 | 72.17 |
| 12 | Dominika Murcková | Slovakia | 107.04 | 12 | 36.40 | 12 | 70.64 |
| 13 | Marcelina Lech | Poland | 99.65 | 14 | 34.62 | 13 | 65.03 |
| 14 | Miroslava Hriňáková | Slovakia | 97.33 | 13 | 35.18 | 15 | 62.15 |
| 15 | Bernadett Szakács | Hungary | 95.86 | 16 | 32.16 | 14 | 63.70 |
| 16 | Ada Wawrzyk | Poland | 93.79 | 15 | 32.63 | 16 | 61.16 |
| 17 | Coco Kaminski | Poland | 89.98 | 17 | 30.84 | 18 | 59.14 |
| 18 | Anna Siedlecka | Poland | 87.43 | 22 | 26.76 | 17 | 60.67 |
| 19 | Agnieszka Rejment | Poland | 85.19 | 21 | 27.26 | 20 | 57.93 |
| 20 | Elżbieta Gabryszak | Poland | 84.08 | 20 | 27.48 | 21 | 56.60 |
| 21 | Eszter Szombathelyi | Hungary | 83.89 | 19 | 28.27 | 22 | 55.62 |
| 22 | Aleksandra Kosowska | Poland | 83.80 | 24 | 25.11 | 19 | 58.69 |
| 23 | Anastasia Vasilieva | Slovakia | 77.54 | 18 | 28.36 | 24 | 49.18 |
| 24 | Walerija Bakunova | Poland | 77.13 | 23 | 25.46 | 23 | 51.67 |
| 25 | Anna Nawrot | Poland | 69.60 | 25 | 23.82 | 25 | 45.78 |

=== Pairs ===
| Rank | Name | Nation | Total points | SP | | FS | |
|---|---|---|---|---|---|---|---|
| 1 | Magdalena Klatka / Radosław Chruściński | Poland | 123.01 | 1 | 42.54 | 1 | 80.47 |

=== Ice dancing ===
| Rank | Name | Nation | Total points | SD | | FD | |
|---|---|---|---|---|---|---|---|
| 1 | Federica Testa / Lukáš Csölley | Slovakia | 140.84 | 1 | 56.54 | 1 | 84.30 |
| 2 | Dóra Turóczi / Balázs Major | Hungary | 122.72 | 2 | 48.36 | 3 | 74.36 |
| 3 | Justyna Plutowska / Peter Gerber | Poland | 122.20 | 4 | 46.92 | 2 | 75.28 |
| 4 | Lucie Myslivečková / Neil Brown | Czech Republic | 118.40 | 3 | 46.97 | 4 | 71.43 |
