= 2015 Four Nationals Figure Skating Championships =

Figure skating competition

2015 Four National Figure Skating Championships
- Type: National championships
- Date: December 18 – 21, 2014
- Season: 2014–15
- Location: Budapest, Hungary
- Host: Hungarian Skating Association
- Previous: 2014 Four National Championships
- Next: 2016 Four National Championships

The 2015 Four National Figure Skating Championships included the Czech Republic, Slovakia, Poland, and Hungary. The event was held in December 2014 in Budapest, Hungary. Skaters competed in the disciplines of men's singles, ladies' singles, pair skating, and ice dancing.

The three highest-placing skaters from each country formed their national podiums. The results were among the criteria used to determine international assignments. It was the seventh consecutive season that the Czech Republic, Slovakia, and Poland held their national championships together and the second season that Hungary participated.

== Medals summary ==
=== Czech Republic ===
Discipline	Gold	Silver	Bronze
Men	Michal Březina	Petr Coufal	Pavel Kaška
Ladies	Eliška Březinová	Elizaveta Ukolova	Jana Coufalová
Ice dancing	Cortney Mansour / Michal Češka	—N/a	

=== Slovakia ===
Discipline	Gold	Silver	Bronze
Men	Marco Klepoch	Jakub Kršňák	—N/a
Ladies	Nicole Rajičová	Bronislava Dobiášová	Alexandra Kunová
Ice dancing	Federica Testa / Lukáš Csölley	—N/a	

=== Poland ===
Discipline	Gold	Silver	Bronze
Men	Patrick Myzyk	Krzysztof Gała	Łukasz Kędzierski
Ladies	Agata Kryger	Agnieszka Rejment	Anna Siedlecka
Ice dancing	Natalia Kaliszek / Maksym Spodyriev	Beatrice Tomczak / Damian Bińkowski	—N/a

=== Hungary ===
Discipline	Gold	Silver	Bronze
Men	Kristóf Forgó	—N/a	
Ladies	Ivett Tóth	Eszter Szombathelyi	—N/a
Ice dancing	Szilvia Magyar / Dániel Majer	Beatrix Pipek / József Kálmán	—N/a

== Senior results ==
=== Men ===
Rank	Name	Nation	Total points	SP		FS	
1	Michal Březina	Czech Republic	210.69	1	71.97	1	138.72
2	Petr Coufal	Czech Republic	191.35	2	62.96	2	128.39
3	Pavel Kaška	Czech Republic	166.96	3	57.78	4	109.18
4	Patrick Myzyk	Poland	166.81	4	56.99	3	109.82
5	Tomáš Kupka	Czech Republic	152.96	8	51.30	6	101.66
6	Petr Kotlařík	Czech Republic	151.39	10	47.15	5	104.24
7	Jiří Bělohradský	Czech Republic	149.54	7	51.44	7	98.10
8	Marco Klepoch	Slovakia	145.01	6	51.51	9	93.50
9	Kristóf Forgó	Hungary	141.99	12	47.05	8	94.94
10	Krzysztof Gała	Poland	136.73	5	53.61	11	83.12
11	Łukasz Kędzierski	Poland	133.01	11	47.11	10	85.90
12	Kamil Dymowski	Poland	123.52	9	49.44	15	74.08
13	Ryszard Gurtler	Poland	121.94	13	46.72	13	75.22
14	Andrzej Siciński	Poland	118.02	14	44.32	16	73.70
15	Jakub Kršňák	Slovakia	117.87	15	42.27	12	75.60
16	Wiktor Witkowski	Poland	111.03	16	36.72	14	74.31

=== Ladies ===
Rank	Name	Nation	Total points	SP		FS	
1	Nicole Rajičová	Slovakia	156.60	1	55.81	1	100.79
2	Ivett Tóth	Hungary	146.21	3	47.85	2	98.36
3	Eliška Březinová	Czech Republic	139.45	2	48.14	3	91.31
4	Elizaveta Ukolova	Czech Republic	128.21	4	44.48	4	83.73
5	Bronislava Dobiášová	Slovakia	123.92	5	42.45	5	81.47
6	Jana Coufalová	Czech Republic	122.06	7	41.96	6	80.10
7	Alexandra Kunová	Slovakia	120.07	6	42.14	7	77.93
8	Nina Letenayová	Slovakia	110.58	9	36.20	8	74.38
9	Agata Kryger	Poland	101.12	8	39.08	10	62.04
10	Agnieszka Rejment	Poland	95.92	10	33.99	11	61.93
11	Eszter Szombathelyi	Hungary	92.19	11	32.58	12	59.61
12	Klára Světlíková	Czech Republic	90.72	14	25.26	9	65.46
13	Anna Siedlecka	Poland	89.20	12	30.35	13	58.85
14	Ada Wawrzyk	Poland	83.11	13	28.74	14	54.37
WD	Bernadett Szakács	Hungary					

=== Ice dancing ===
Rank	Name	Nation	Total points	SD		FD	
1	Federica Testa / Lukáš Csölley	Slovakia	144.44	1	57.42	1	87.02
2	Natalia Kaliszek / Maksym Spodyriev	Poland	122.88	2	52.26	2	70.62
3	Cortney Mansour / Michal Češka	Czech Republic	116.12	3	46.60	3	69.52
4	Beatrice Tomczak / Damian Bińkowski	Poland	106.36	4	42.58	4	63.78
5	Szilvia Magyar / Dániel Majer	Hungary	74.96	5	29.82	5	45.14
6	Beatrix Pipek / József Kálmán	Hungary	59.64	6	23.52	6	36.12
