= 2019 Four Nationals Figure Skating Championships =

Figure skating competition

- Type: National championships
- Date: December 14 – 15, 2018
- Season: 2018–19
- Location: Budapest, Hungary
- Host: Hungarian National Skating Federation
- Previous: 2018 Four National Championships
- Next: 2020 Four National Championships

The 2019 Four Nationals Figure Skating Championships included the Czech Republic, Slovakia, Poland, and Hungary. It took place on December 14–15, 2018 in Budapest, Hungary. The results were split by country; the three highest-placing skaters from each country formed their national podiums in men's singles, ladies' singles, and ice dancing. The results were among the criteria used to determine international assignments.

== Medals summary ==
=== Czech Republic ===
Discipline	Gold	Silver	Bronze
Men	Matyáš Bělohradský	Petr Kotlařík	Daniel Mrázek
Ladies	Eliška Březinová	Klára Štěpánová	Aneta Janiczková

=== Hungary ===
Discipline	Gold	Silver	Bronze
Men	Alexander Borovoj	Alexander Maszljanko	András Csernoch
Ladies	Ivett Tóth	Fruzsina Medgyesi	Kloé Rozgonyi
Ice dancing	Anna Yanovskaya / Ádám Lukács	Emily Monaghan / Ilias Fourati	Beatrice Tomczak / Dániel Illés

=== Poland ===
Discipline	Gold	Silver	Bronze
Men	Ihor Reznichenko	Krzysztof Gała	Olgierd Febbi
Ladies	Ekaterina Kurakova	Elżbieta Gabryszak	Magdalena Zawadzka
Ice dancing	Natalia Kaliszek / Maksym Spodyriev	Justyna Plutowska / Jérémie Flemin	Jenna Hertenstein / Damian Binkowski

=== Slovakia ===
Nicole Rajičová defeated Silvia Hugec for the Slovak ladies' title while Marco Klepoch overtook Michael Neuman for the men's title.

Discipline	Gold	Silver	Bronze
Men	Marco Klepoch	Michael Neuman	—
Ladies	Nicole Rajičová	Silvia Hugec	—

== Senior results ==
=== Men ===
Matyáš Bělohradský was first and won the Czech senior men's title for the first time.

Rank	Name	Nation	Total points	SP		FS	
1	Matyáš Bělohradský	Czech Republic	207.91	1	67.41	1	140.50
2	Petr Kotlařík	Czech Republic	182.22	2	67.21	3	115.01
3	Ihor Reznichenko	Poland	176.61	3	62.91	5	113.70
4	Daniel Mrazek	Czech Republic	173.63	7	58.59	2	115.04
5	Krzysztof Gala	Poland	173.45	5	59.38	4	114.07
6	Radek Jakuba	Czech Republic	166.96	8	58.45	6	108.51
7	Jiří Bělohradský	Czech Republic	165.29	9	58.41	7	106.88
8	Georgii Reshtenko	Czech Republic	164.54	4	61.45	10	103.09
9	Filip Scerba	Czech Republic	158.69	11	53.88	9	104.81
10	Olgierd Febbi	Poland	157.74	12	52.93	8	104.81
11	Alexander Borovoj	Hungary	155.44	10	54.05	11	101.39
12	Alexander Maszljanko	Hungary	153.71	6	58.64	15	95.07
13	Lukasz Kedzierski	Poland	153.11	13	52.49	12	100.62
14	Marco Klepoch	Slovakia	147.26	16	47.76	13	99.50
15	Eryk Matysiak	Poland	140.91	15	49.81	16	91.10
16	Michael Neuman	Slovakia	140.44	14	51.19	17	89.25
17	András Csernoch	Hungary	129.57	20	34.32	14	95.25
18	Máté Böröcz	Hungary	125.63	19	39.39	18	86.24
19	Andrzej Sicinski	Poland	121.20	17	45.23	19	75.97
20	Michal Wozniak	Poland	115.85	18	41.66	20	74.19

=== Ladies ===
Making her debut for Poland, 16-year-old Ekaterina Kurakova finished first, ahead of the Czech Republic's Eliška Březinová and Hungary's Ivett Tóth.

Rank	Name	Nation	Total points	SP		FS	
1	Ekaterina Kurakova	Poland	178.80	1	57.76	1	121.04
2	Eliška Březinová	Czech Republic	145.49	2	56.10	4	89.39
3	Ivett Tóth	Hungary	141.00	4	51.05	3	89.95
4	Elżbieta Gabryszak	Poland	138.45	6	48.40	2	90.05
5	Nicole Rajičová	Slovakia	137.44	7	48.18	5	89.26
6	Fruzsina Medgyesi	Hungary	132.62	5	48.41	7	84.21
7	Silvia Hugec	Slovakia	132.10	3	55.50	10	76.60
8	Klara Stepanova	Czech Republic	128.31	9	41.69	6	86.62
9	Magdalena Zawadzka	Poland	122.97	10	40.77	8	82.20
10	Aneta Janiczkova	Czech Republic	117.41	8	44.63	12	72.78
11	Oliwia Rzepiel	Poland	114.62	11	40.29	11	74.33
12	Nikola Rychtarikova	Czech Republic	112.17	17	32.58	9	79.59
13	Elizaveta Ukolova	Czech Republic	107.99	12	39.94	13	68.05
14	Michaela Lucie Hanzlíková	Czech Republic	103.44	15	37.00	15	66.44
15	Agnieszka Rejment	Poland	97.54	19	30.12	14	67.42
16	Kloé Rozgonyi	Hungary	97.53	16	33.35	16	64.18
17	Natalia Lerka	Poland	95.95	18	32.22	17	63.73
WD	Dária Jakab	Hungary	withdrew	13	37.30	withdrew from competition	
WD	Bronislava Dobiášová	Slovakia	withdrew	14	37.27	withdrew from competition	
WD	Daniela Ko	Czech Republic	withdrew	20	29.37	withdrew from competition	

=== Ice dance ===
Natalia Kaliszek / Maksym Spodyriev and Anna Yanovskaya / Ádám Lukács were the Polish and Hungarian champions respectively, with Kaliszek / Spodyriev receiving the top scores.

Rank	Name	Nation	Total points	RD		FD	
1	Natalia Kaliszek / Maksym Spodyriev	Poland	171.12	1	67.95	1	103.17
2	Anna Yanovskaya / Ádám Lukács	Hungary	165.43	2	64.46	2	100.97
3	Justyna Plutowska / Jeremie Flemin	Poland	146.36	3	56.06	3	90.30
4	Emily Monaghan / Ilias Fourati	Hungary	142.97	4	55.79	4	87.18
5	Jenna Hertenstein / Damian Binkowski	Poland	112.96	5	44.13	6	68.83
6	Beatrice Tomczak / Dániel Illés	Hungary	111.33	6	41.59	5	69.74
