= 2014 CS Ondrej Nepela Trophy =

Figure skating competition

2014 Ondrej Nepela Trophy
- Type: ISU Challenger Series
- Date: October 1 – 5
- Season: 2014–15
- Location: Bratislava
- Venue: Ondrej Nepela Ice Rink

Champions
- Men's singles: (United States) Stephen Carriere
- Ladies' singles: (Italy) Roberta Rodeghiero
- Ice dance: (United States) Maia Shibutani / Alex Shibutani
- Previous: 2013 Ondrej Nepela Trophy
- Next: 2015 CS Ondrej Nepela Trophy

The 2014 Ondrej Nepela Trophy was the 22nd edition of an annual senior international figure skating competition held in Bratislava, Slovakia. A part of the 2014–15 ISU Challenger Series, it was held on October 1–5, 2014 at the Ondrej Nepela Ice Rink. Medals were awarded in the disciplines of men's singles, ladies' singles, and ice dancing. The pairs' event was cancelled after the entries withdrew.

== Entries ==
| Country | Men | Ladies | Ice dancing |
|---|---|---|---|
| Austria | Albert Mück | Kerstin Frank; Christina Grill; Sabrina Schulz | Barbora Silná / Juri Kurakin |
| Czech Republic | | Eliška Březinová; Elizaveta Ukolova | |
| Germany | | Nathalie Weinzierl | |
| Hungary | Kristof Forgo | | |
| Italy | Maurizio Zandron | Roberta Rodeghiero | Charlène Guignard / Marco Fabbri; Misato Komatsubara / Andrea Fabbri |
| Japan | | Haruka Imai | |
| South Korea | Kim Jin-seo | Kim Hae-jin | |
| Lithuania | | Inga Janulevičiūtė | |
| Russia | Gordei Gorshkov | | |
| Slovakia | Marco Klepoch; Jakub Kršňák | Bronislava Dobiášová; Miroslava Hriňáková; Alexandra Kunová | Federica Testa / Lukáš Csölley |
| Slovenia | | Nika Ceric | |
| Sweden | | Joshi Helgesson; Viktoria Helgesson | |
| Turkey | | | Çağla Demirsal / Berk Akalın |
| Ukraine | | Anna Khnychenkova | Lolita Yermak / Alexei Shumski |
| United Kingdom | Jack Newberry | | Olivia Smart / Joseph Buckland |
| United States | Stephen Carriere | Ashley Cain | Maia Shibutani / Alex Shibutani |

== Results ==
=== Men ===
| Rank | Name | Nation | Total points | SP | | FS | |
|---|---|---|---|---|---|---|---|
| 1 | Stephen Carriere | United States | 219.76 | 2 | 71.18 | 1 | 148.58 |
| 2 | Kim Jin-seo | South Korea | 207.34 | 1 | 71.44 | 3 | 135.90 |
| 3 | Gordei Gorshkov | Russia | 206.55 | 3 | 67.70 | 2 | 138.85 |
| 4 | Kristof Forgo | Hungary | 146.93 | 4 | 48.90 | 4 | 98.03 |
| 5 | Jack Newberry | United Kingdom | 133.37 | 5 | 46.43 | 5 | 86.94 |
| 6 | Marco Klepoch | Slovakia | 119.84 | 6 | 44.74 | 6 | 75.10 |
| 7 | Jakub Kršňák | Slovakia | 110.64 | 7 | 38.90 | 7 | 71.74 |
| WD | Albert Mück | Austria | | | | | |

=== Ladies ===
| Rank | Name | Nation | Total points | SP | | FS | |
|---|---|---|---|---|---|---|---|
| 1 | Roberta Rodeghiero | Italy | 150.83 | 6 | 47.53 | 1 | 103.30 |
| 2 | Joshi Helgesson | Sweden | 150.05 | 1 | 59.51 | 3 | 90.54 |
| 3 | Ashley Cain | United States | 142.95 | 2 | 54.05 | 5 | 88.90 |
| 4 | Viktoria Helgesson | Sweden | 135.73 | 3 | 49.85 | 6 | 85.88 |
| 5 | Haruka Imai | Japan | 135.15 | 11 | 41.90 | 2 | 93.25 |
| 6 | Eliška Březinová | Czech Republic | 134.55 | 10 | 44.13 | 4 | 90.42 |
| 7 | Nathalie Weinzierl | Germany | 132.11 | 4 | 49.40 | 8 | 82.71 |
| 8 | Kerstin Frank | Austria | 131.11 | 5 | 48.65 | 9 | 82.46 |
| 9 | Kim Hae-jin | South Korea | 128.88 | 7 | 46.09 | 7 | 82.79 |
| 10 | Bronislava Dobiášová | Slovakia | 124.42 | 8 | 45.89 | 10 | 78.53 |
| 11 | Elizaveta Ukolova | Czech Republic | 113.14 | 12 | 40.61 | 11 | 72.53 |
| 12 | Anna Khnychenkova | Ukraine | 111.99 | 9 | 45.62 | 12 | 66.37 |
| 13 | Inga Janulevičiūtė | Lithuania | 101.89 | 13 | 36.24 | 13 | 65.65 |
| 14 | Alexandra Kunová | Slovakia | 94.94 | 14 | 32.97 | 14 | 61.97 |
| 15 | Christina Grill | Austria | 82.76 | 15 | 26.11 | 15 | 56.65 |
| 16 | Sabrina Schulz | Austria | 81.09 | 16 | 25.16 | 16 | 55.93 |

=== Ice dancing ===
| Rank | Name | Nation | Total points | SD | | FD | |
|---|---|---|---|---|---|---|---|
| 1 | Maia Shibutani / Alex Shibutani | United States | 162.98 | 1 | 62.72 | 1 | 100.26 |
| 2 | Charlène Guignard / Marco Fabbri | Italy | 143.94 | 2 | 58.14 | 2 | 85.80 |
| 3 | Federica Testa / Lukáš Csölley | Slovakia | 127.22 | 3 | 52.52 | 3 | 74.70 |
| 4 | Olivia Smart / Joseph Buckland | United Kingdom | 115.46 | 4 | 48.60 | 4 | 66.86 |
| 5 | Barbora Silná / Juri Kurakin | Austria | 108.76 | 5 | 44.88 | 7 | 63.88 |
| 6 | Misato Komatsubara / Andrea Fabbri | Italy | 108.48 | 6 | 42.98 | 5 | 65.50 |
| 7 | Lolita Yermak / Alexei Shumski | Ukraine | 105.30 | 7 | 39.88 | 6 | 65.42 |
| 8 | Çağla Demirsal / Berk Akalın | Turkey | 79.10 | 8 | 28.56 | 8 | 50.54 |
