= 2015 CS Ondrej Nepela Trophy =

Figure skating competition

2015 Ondrej Nepela Trophy
- Type: ISU Challenger Series
- Date: October 1 – 3
- Season: 2015–16
- Location: Bratislava
- Venue: Ondrej Nepela Ice Rink

Champions
- Men's singles: (United States) Jason Brown
- Ladies' singles: (Russia) Evgenia Medvedeva
- Pairs: (Russia) Ksenia Stolbova / Fedor Klimov
- Ice dance: (Canada) Piper Gilles / Paul Poirier
- Previous: 2014 CS Ondrej Nepela Trophy
- Next: 2016 CS Ondrej Nepela Memorial

The 2015 Ondrej Nepela Trophy was the 23rd edition of an annual senior international figure skating competition held in Bratislava, Slovakia. A part of the 2015–16 ISU Challenger Series, it was held on October 1–3, 2015 at the Ondrej Nepela Ice Rink. Medals were awarded in the disciplines of men's singles, ladies' singles, pair skating, and ice dancing.

== Entries ==
The preliminary entries were published on 26 August 2015.

Country	Men	Ladies	Pairs	Ice dancing
Australia	Andrew Dodds; Jordan Dodds		Paris Stephens / Matthew Dodds	
Austria	Mario-Rafael Ionian; Manuel Koll	Kerstin Frank; Belinda Schönberger	Miriam Ziegler / Severin Kiefer	
Belarus	Pavel Ignatenko			
Canada	Keegan Messing	Gabrielle Daleman	Lubov Iliushechkina / Dylan Moscovitch	Piper Gilles / Paul Poirier
Czech Republic		Eliška Březinová; Jana Coufalova; Anna Duskova		Cortney Mansour / Michal Češka
Estonia		Helery Hälvin		
Finland	Matthias Verluis			
France	Alexander Zahradnicek			
Germany	Martin Rappe			Kavita Lorenz / Panagiotis Polizoakis
Hungary			Anna Marie Pearce / Mark Magyar	
Italy		Sara Falotico; Roberta Rodeghiero		Victoria Manni / Saverio Giacomelli
Japan		Riona Kato; Yuka Nagai		
Latvia		Angelīna Kučvaļska		
Poland	Patrick Myzyk			
Russia	Gordei Gorshkov; Mikhail Kolyada; Adian Pitkeev	Maria Artemieva; Evgenia Medvedeva; Anna Pogorilaya	Kristina Astakhova / Alexei Rogonov; Ksenia Stolbova / Fedor Klimov; Evgenia Tarasova / Vladimir Morozov	
Slovakia	Marco Klepoch; Jakub Kršňák; Michael Neuman	Bronislava Dobiášová; Alexandra Hagarova; Nicole Rajičová		Federica Testa / Lukáš Csölley
Sweden		Joshi Helgesson		
Switzerland		Laure Nicodet	Ioulia Chtchetinina / Noah scherer Alexandra Herbríková / Nicolas Roulet	
United Kingdom	Charlie Parry-Evans			Penny Coomes / Nicholas Buckland
United States	Jason Brown	Mariah Bell	Gretchen Donlan / Nathan Bartholomay	Maia Shibutani / Alex Shibutani

== Results ==
=== Men ===
Rank	Name	Nation	Total points	SP		FS	
1	Jason Brown	United States	239.37	2	76.98	1	162.39
2	Mikhail Kolyada	Russia	229.59	1	84.33	4	145.26
3	Gordei Gorshkov	Russia	223.25	3	76.25	2	147.00
4	Adian Pitkeev	Russia	204.20	5	58.37	3	145.83
5	Keegan Messing	Canada	195.67	4	73.16	5	122.51
6	Matthias Versluis	Finland	168.31	6	56.52	6	111.79
7	Pavel Ignatenko	Belarus	155.32	9	51.09	7	104.23
8	Andrew Dodds	Australia	141.80	8	51.49	11	90.31
9	Charlie Parry-Evans	United Kingdom	141.67	11	48.18	10	93.49
10	Patrick Myzyk	Poland	141.56	13	45.56	9	96.00
11	Alexander Zahradnicek	France	140.83	14	44.64	8	96.19
12	Michael Neuman	Slovakia	131.63	7	53.65	14	77.98
13	Manuel Koll	Austria	129.84	10	49.03	12	80.81
14	Marco Klepoch	Slovakia	126.16	12	46.65	13	79.51
15	Jordan Dodds	Australia	107.17	16	34.13	15	73.04
16	Jakub Krsnak	Slovakia	99.66	15	41.44	16	58.22

=== Ladies ===
Rank	Name	Nation	Total points	SP		FS	
1	Evgenia Medvedeva	Russia	183.94	1	63.68	2	120.26
2	Anna Pogorilaya	Russia	178.38	9	53.01	1	125.37
3	Maria Artemieva	Russia	177.21	3	61.21	3	116.00
4	Gabrielle Daleman	Canada	171.72	4	60.76	4	110.96
5	Riona Kato	Japan	166.55	2	61.84	7	104.71
6	Yuka Nagai	Japan	165.17	6	56.74	5	108.43
7	Joshi Helgesson	Sweden	161.07	5	60.03	9	101.04
8	Roberta Rodeghiero	Italy	156.64	8	53.19	8	103.45
9	Nicole Rajičová	Slovakia	156.29	12	49.65	6	106.64
10	Angelīna Kučvaļska	Latvia	150.38	7	53.38	10	97.00
11	Anna Duskova	Czech Republic	146.46	11	51.01	11	95.45
12	Eliška Březinová	Czech Republic	144.65	10	51.77	12	92.88
13	Mariah Bell	United States	135.43	13	43.93	13	91.50
14	Helery Halvin	Estonia	120.14	15	38.75	16	81.39
15	Alexandra Hagarova	Slovakia	118.08	18	35.81	14	82.27
16	Kerstin Frank	Austria	116.24	19	34.18	15	82.06
17	Bronislava Dobiášová	Slovakia	107.78	16	38.56	17	69.22
18	Sara Falotico	Italy	105.89	17	37.90	18	67.99
19	Jana Coufalova	Czech Republic	101.23	14	39.42	21	61.81
20	Laure Nicodet	Switzerland	100.75	20	33.27	19	67.48
21	Belinda Schönberger	Austria	98.68	21	31.50	20	67.18

=== Pairs ===
Rank	Name	Nation	Total points	SP		FS	
1	Ksenia Stolbova / Fedor Klimov	Russia	190.28	2	66.10	2	124.18
2	Kristina Astakhova / Alexei Rogonov	Russia	185.00	3	60.50	1	124.50
3	Evgenia Tarasova / Vladimir Morozov	Russia	184.28	1	66.94	3	117.34
4	Lubov Iliushechkina / Dylan Moscovitch	Canada	169.04	4	57.38	4	111.66
5	Miriam Ziegler / Severin Kiefer	Austria	147.22	6	47.54	5	99.68
6	Gretchen Donlan / Nathan Bartholomay	United States	145.44	5	51.76	6	93.68
7	Anna Marie Pierce / Mark Magyar	Hungary	114.34	8	40.24	7	74.10
8	Alexandra Herbríková / Nicolas Roulet	Switzerland	113.28	7	40.62	8	72.66
9	Ioulia Chtchetinina / Noah Scherer	Switzerland	100.76	9	34.40	9	66.36
10	Paris Stephens / Matthew Dodds	Australia	78.80	10	24.86	10	53.94

=== Ice dancing ===
Rank	Name	Nation	Total points	SD		FD	
1	Piper Gilles / Paul Poirier	Canada	159.14	3	62.56	1	96.58
2	Penny Coomes / Nicholas Buckland	United Kingdom	156.22	2	62.70	2	93.52
3	Maia Shibutani / Alex Shibutani	United States	154.34	1	63.24	3	91.10
4	Federica Testa / Lukáš Csölley	Slovakia	138.66	4	55.08	4	83.58
5	Kavita Lorenz / Panagiotis Polizoakis	Germany	127.30	5	47.36	5	79.94
6	Cortney Mansour / Michal Češka	Czech Republic	117.04	6	45.96	6	71.08
7	Victoria Manni / Saverio Giacomelli	Italy	103.78	7	41.46	7	62.32
