= Igor Macypura =

Ukrainian figure skater

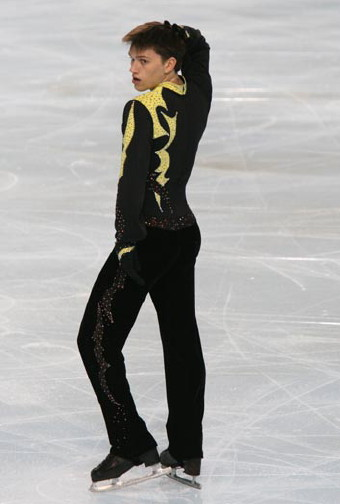
- Macypura in 2008.

Personal information
- Native name: Ігор Маципура
- Born: 10 April 1985 (age 41) Kiev, Ukrainian SSR, Soviet Union (now Kyiv, Ukraine)
- Height: 1.76 m (5 ft 9 in)

Figure skating career
- Country: Slovakia
- Discipline: Men's singles
- Began skating: 1989
- Retired: 2010

Medal record
Representing Slovakia
Slovak Championships
Gold medal – first place	2005 Ružomberok	Singles
Gold medal – first place	2007 Liberec	Singles
Gold medal – first place	2008 Trenčín	Singles

Igor Macypura (Note: Ukrainian: Ігор Маципура, romanized: Ihor Matsypura) (born April 10, 1985) is a figure skater who competed internationally for Slovakia. He is the 2008 Triglav Trophy silver medalist, the 2008 International Cup of Nice bronze medalist, the 2006 Ondrej Nepela Memorial bronze medalist, and a three-time Slovak national champion. He qualified to the free skate at five ISU Championships.

== Personal life ==
Macypura was born on 10 April 1985 in Kyiv, Ukrainian SSR, Soviet Union. He moved to the United States at an early age.

== Career ==
Macypura appeared twice at the U.S. Figure Skating Championships, representing the Peninsula Skating Club. Competing on the junior level at the 2004 U.S. Championships, he won the short program but placed ninth in the free skate to finish eighth overall.

Macypura competed at the 2005 Slovak Championships and won the national title. He began representing Slovakia internationally in the 2005–06 season. At the 2005 Karl Schäfer Memorial, the last Olympic qualifying competition, he placed 8th and qualified a spot to the 2006 Winter Olympics in Turin. However, the Slovak Olympic Committee decided not to send him.

Macypura won the bronze medal at the 2006 Ondrej Nepela Memorial, silver at the 2008 Triglav Trophy, and bronze at the 2008 International Cup of Nice. He appeared at three Grand Prix events – 2008 Skate America, 2008 Trophee Eric Bompard, and 2009 Skate America. He also competed at four European and four World Championships, qualifying to the free skate five times – at the 2007 Europeans in Warsaw, 2007 Worlds in Tokyo, 2008 Worlds in Gothenburg, 2009 Europeans in Helsinki, and 2009 Worlds in Los Angeles.

Macypura finished second to Peter Reitmayer in a Slovak internal competition to determine the skater who would compete at the 2009 Nebelhorn Trophy, the final qualifying opportunity for the 2010 Winter Olympics in Vancouver.

== Programs ==
Season	Short program	Free skating
2009–10	Blues for Klook by Eddy Louiss	The Passion of the Christ; Planet Earth
2007–09	Street Passions by Didulya	Spring by Loreat
2006–07	Carmina Burana by Carl Orff	The Rock by Nick Glennie-Smith
2005–06	The Matrix	The Rock by Nick Glennie-Smith

== Competitive highlights ==
GP: Grand Prix

=== Single skating (for Slovakia) ===
International
Event	04–05	05–06	06–07	07–08	08–09	09–10
World Championships		27th	21st	21st	24th	
European Championships		30th	17th	33rd	16th	
GP Trophée Éric Bompard					10th	
GP Skate America					9th	12th
Cup of Nice					3rd	
Nebelhorn Trophy			9th	4th	13th	
Nepela Memorial		10th	3rd	6th	6th	
Schäfer Memorial		8th	9th		6th	
Triglav Trophy				2nd		
National
Slovak Championships	1st		1st	1st		

=== Single skating (for the United States) ===
National
Event	03–04
U.S. Championships	8th J
