= Juraj Sviatko =

Slovak figure skater

Personal information
- Born: 22 October 1980 (age 45) Košice, Czechoslovakia
- Height: 1.75 m (5 ft 9 in)

Figure skating career
- Country: Slovakia
- Discipline: Men's singles
- Skating club: MKK Gorenje Nitra
- Began skating: 1985
- Retired: 2006

Medal record
Slovak Championships
| Gold medal – first place | 2002 Bratislava | Singles |
| Gold medal – first place | 2003 Bratislava | Singles |
| Gold medal – first place | 2004 Bratislava | Singles |
| Gold medal – first place | 2006 Košice | Singles |
| Silver medal – second place | 2001 Ružomberok | Singles |
| Silver medal – second place | 2005 Ružomberok | Singles |

Juraj Sviatko (born 22 October 1980) is a Slovak former competitive figure skater. He is a six-time national champion and placed 8th at the 1998 World Junior Championships. As a senior, his highest placement was 17th at the 2002 European Championships.

== Programs ==
| Season | Short program | Free skating |
|---|---|---|
| 2004–05 | Sway (Mucho Mambo) by N. Gimbel; Jazz Machine (from Dance with Me) by Black Machine; Pantera En Libertad by Monica Naranjo | Gypsy Music by Goran Bregović |
| 2002–03 | From Hell by Trevor Jones | Music by Safri Duo; Music by Ludwig van Beethoven |
| 2001–02 | Music de Indiana | Blaze of Glory by Bon Jovi; Scottish Bagpipes |

== Competitive highlights ==
JGP: Junior Series/Junior Grand Prix

International
| Event | 94–95 | 95–96 | 96–97 | 97–98 | 98–99 | 99–00 | 00–01 | 01–02 | 02–03 | 03–04 | 04–05 | 05–06 |
|---|---|---|---|---|---|---|---|---|---|---|---|---|
| Worlds | | | | 36th | | | | 25th | 29th | 30th | | |
| Europeans | | | | | | 24th | | 17th | | 26th | 25th | |
| Finlandia Trophy | | | | | | | | | | 8th | | |
| Golden Spin | | | | | | | | | 14th | 10th | | |
| Nebelhorn Trophy | | | | | 11th | | | | | | | |
| Nepela Memorial | | | 6th | 10th | 9th | 9th | 4th | 11th | 4th | 7th | | 11th |
| Schäfer Memorial | | | 18th | | | | 6th | 7th | 6th | 7th | | |
| Skate Israel | | | | | | 14th | | | | | | |
| Universiade | | | | | | | 14th | | | | | |
International: Junior
| Junior Worlds | | | | 8th | 27th | 21st | | | | | | |
| JGP France | | | | 11th | | | | | | | | |
| JGP Hungary | | | | | 14th | | | | | | | |
| JGP Netherlands | | | | | | 7th | | | | | | |
| JGP Norway | | | | | | 11th | | | | | | |
| JGP Slovakia | | | | 3rd | 7th | | | | | | | |
| EYOF | | | 7th | | | | | | | | | |
| Grand Prize SNP | | 11th J | 6th J | | | 1st J | | | | | | |
National
| Slovak Champ. | 1st J | 1st J | 2nd | 1st | 2nd | 1st | 2nd | 1st | 1st | 1st | 2nd | 1st |
