= Krzysztof Gała =

Polish figure skater

Personal information
- Born: 30 March 1996 (age 30) Łódź, Poland
- Height: 1.70 m (5 ft 7 in)

Figure skating career
- Discipline: Men's singles
- Coach: Stefan Potęga
- Skating club: MKŁ Łódź
- Began skating: 2002

Medal record
Polish Championships
Gold medal – first place	2017 Katowice	Singles
Silver medal – second place	2014 Bratislava	Singles
Silver medal – second place	2015 Budapest	Singles
Silver medal – second place	2018 Košice	Singles
Silver medal – second place	2019 Budapest	Singles

Krzysztof Gała (born 30 March 1996) is a Polish figure skater, starting in man single skating category.

He is a multiple Polish Champion and participant of international events, including World and European Championships.

== Programs ==
Season	Short program	Free skating
2014–15	Moonlight Sonata by Ludwig van Beethoven	Game of Thrones (soundtrack) by Ramin Djawadi

== Competitive highlights ==
JGP: Junior Grand Prix; CS: Challenger Series

International
Event	11–12	12–13	13–14	14–15	15–16	16–17	17–18	18–19	19–20
CS Ondrej Nepela								12th	
CS Warsaw Cup					13th	17th			25th
CS Denkova-Staviski Cup					7th				
Challenge Cup						11th			
Slovenia Open							6th		
Toruń Cup					4th	11th	4th		
Warsaw Cup								20th	
International: Junior
Junior Worlds			37th	38th					
JGP Germany				17th					
JGP Estonia				15th					
JGP Poland	17th		21st						
JGP Latvia			18th						
JGP Slovenia		17th							
JGP Italy	21st								
Toruń Cup		3rd J.	6th J.	1st J.					
Warsaw Cup	4th J.		2nd J.						
National
Polish Championships		4th	2nd	2nd	3rd	1st	2nd	2nd	
Polish Junior Champ.	2nd	2nd	1st	1st					
J = Junior level
