= Radka Bártová =

Slovak figure skater (born 1990)

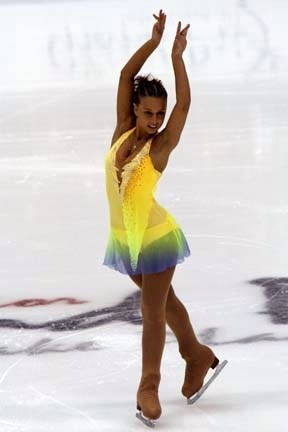
- Radka Bártová in 2007

Personal information
- Born: 16 July 1990 (age 36) Košice, Czechoslovakia
- Height: 1.62 m (5 ft 4 in)

Figure skating career
- Country: Slovakia
- Discipline: Women's singles
- Began skating: 1995
- Retired: 2009

Medal record
Slovak Championships
Gold medal – first place	2007 Liberec	Singles
Silver medal – second place	2008 Trenčín	Singles
Bronze medal – third place	2009 Třinec	Singles

Radka Bártová (born 16 July 1990) is a Slovak former competitive figure skater. She is the 2006 Karl Schäfer Memorial bronze medalist and 2007 Slovak national champion. She competed in the final segment at four ISU Championships – the 2005 World Junior Championships in Kitchener, Ontario, Canada; 2006 World Junior Championships in Ljubljana, Slovenia; and 2007 European Championships in Warsaw, Poland; and 2007 World Figure Skating Championships in Tokio, Japan.

Bártová trained in Košice, Prešov, and Trebišov, coached by Hana Tőcziková and Miriam Lipčáková.

== Programs ==
Season	Short program	Free skating
2006–2007	Hungarian Rhapsodies by Franz Liszt	Hidalgo by James Newton Howard
2005–2006	Hungarian Rhapsodies by Franz Liszt	Music performed by Bond
2004–2005	Capriccio Espagnol, op. 34 by Nikolai Rimsky-Korsakov	Music performed by Bond

== Competitive highlights ==
International
Event	04–05	05–06	06–07	07–08	08–09
World Champ.			33rd		
European Champ.			23rd		
Golden Spin				19th	
Schäfer Memorial			3rd		
Nebelhorn Trophy					21st
Nepela Memorial				8th	14th
International: Junior
World Junior Champ.	23rd	22nd			
JGP Austria				14th	
JGP Belarus					18th
JGP Czech Republic					21st
JGP Estonia		12th			
JGP Hungary	26th		18th		
JGP Romania	14th		8th		
JGP Slovakia		15th			
JGP United States				16th	
Grand Prize SNP	1st J	4th J			
EYOF			4th J		
National
Slovak Champ.	1st J	1st J	1st	2nd	3rd
J = Junior level; JGP = Junior Grand Prix
