= Slovak Figure Skating Championships =

Recurring figure skating competition

- Status: Active
- Genre: National championships
- Frequency: Annual
- Country: Slovakia
- Inaugurated: 1994
- Previous event: 2026 Four Nationals Championships
- Next event: 2027 Four Nationals Championships
- Organizer: Slovak Figure Skating Association

The Slovak Figure Skating Championships (Slovak: Majstrovstvá Slovenska v krasokorčuľovaní) are an annual figure skating competition organized by the Slovak Figure Skating Association (Slovak: Slovenský Krasokorčuliarsky Zväz) to crown the national champions of Slovakia. The first Slovak Championships held after the dissolution of Czechoslovakia took place in December 1993 in Banská Bystrica. Currently, the senior-level championships, as well as the junior-level pair skating and ice dance championships, are held in conjunction with the skating federations of the Czech Republic, Hungary, and Poland as part of the Four Nationals Figure Skating Championships. Junior-level single skaters compete in a separate competition that is exclusive to Slovakia.

Medals are awarded in men's singles, women's singles, and ice dance at the senior and junior levels, although each discipline may not necessarily be held every year due to a lack of participants. There has not been competition in pair skating in Slovakia since 2010. Juraj Sviatko holds the record for winning the most Slovak Championships titles in men's singles (with six), while Zuzana Babiaková (née Paurová) holds the record in women's singles (with nine). Siblings Oľga Beständigová and Jozef Beständig hold the record in pair skating (with seven), and Lukáš Csölley holds the record in ice dance (with nine), although not all won with the same partner.

== History ==
The first Slovak skating club was founded in 1871 in Bratislava. In 1918, after the dissolution of the Austro-Hungarian Empire, the First Czechoslovak Republic was established. The Skating Union of the Czechoslovak Republic (Slovak: Korčuliarsky zväz Československej republiky) was formed in 1922, bringing together both Czech and Slovak skaters. Skating lagged in Slovakia until the construction of an artificial ice rink in Bratislava in 1941. Czech and Slovak skaters competed at the Czechoslovak Figure Skating Championships until the dissolution of Czechoslovakia in 1992. While Czechoslovakia ceased to exist on 31 December 1992, the 1993 Czechoslovak Championships had actually taken place earlier that month. The Slovak Republic was established on 1 January 1993, and in June 1993, the Slovak Figure Skating Association was accepted as a member of the International Skating Union. The first official Slovak Figure Skating Championships were held in Banská Bystrica in December 1993. Rastislav Vnučko won the men's event, Zaneta Štefániková won the women's event, and Viera Poráčová and Pavol Poráč won the ice dance event.

The Czech and Slovak skating federations ran independent national championships until the 2006–07 season, when the two associations joined their championships together as one event. The inaugural Czech and Slovak Figure Skating Championships were held in Liberec in the Czech Republic. Tomáš Verner of the Czech Republic won the men's event, while Igor Macypura was the highest ranked Slovak skater. Ivana Reitmayerová of Slovakia won the women's event, while Nella Simaová was the highest ranked Czech skater. Kamila Hájková and David Vincour of the Czech Republic were the only entrants in the ice dance event. The Czech Republic and Slovakia alternated as hosts for the combined championships until the 2008–09 season, when Poland joined and the Three Nationals Figure Skating Championships were officially formed. Since Hungary joined during the 2013–14 season, the event has been known as the Four Nationals Figure Skating Championships. The four nations rotate as hosts, while skaters from the four countries compete together and the results are then split at the end of the competition to form national podiums.

== Senior medalists ==
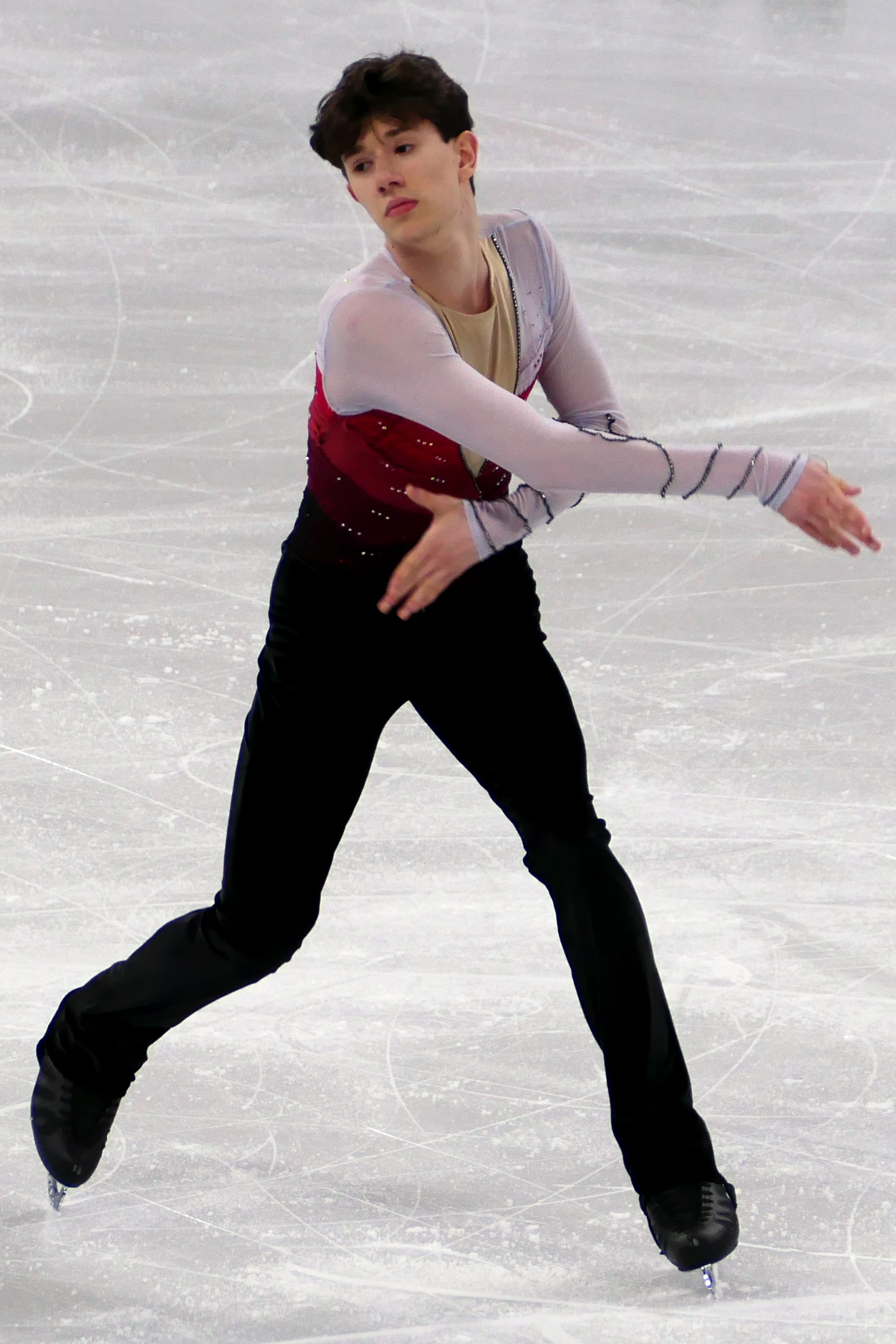
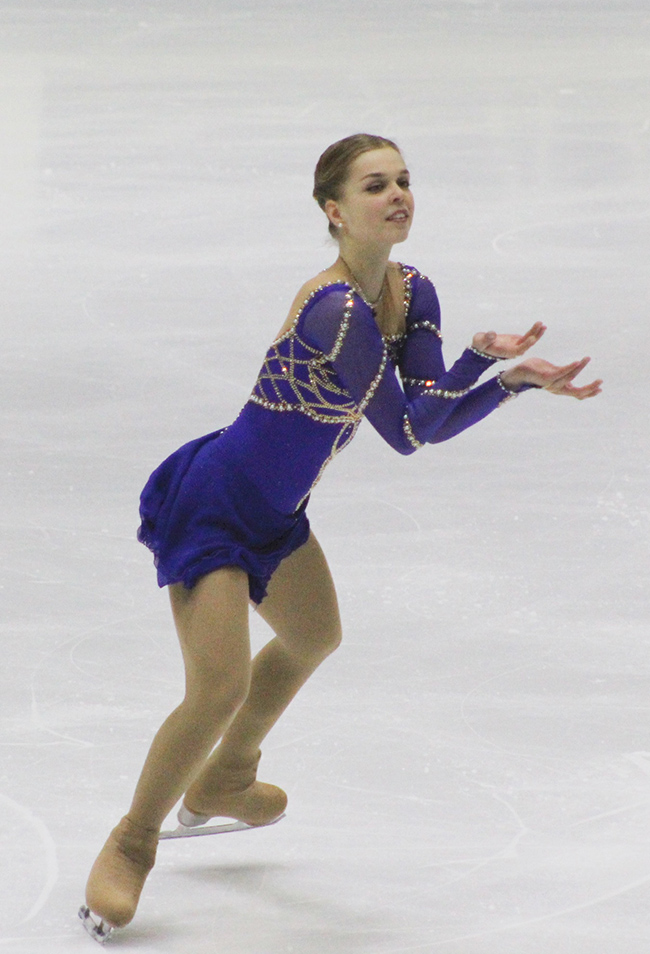
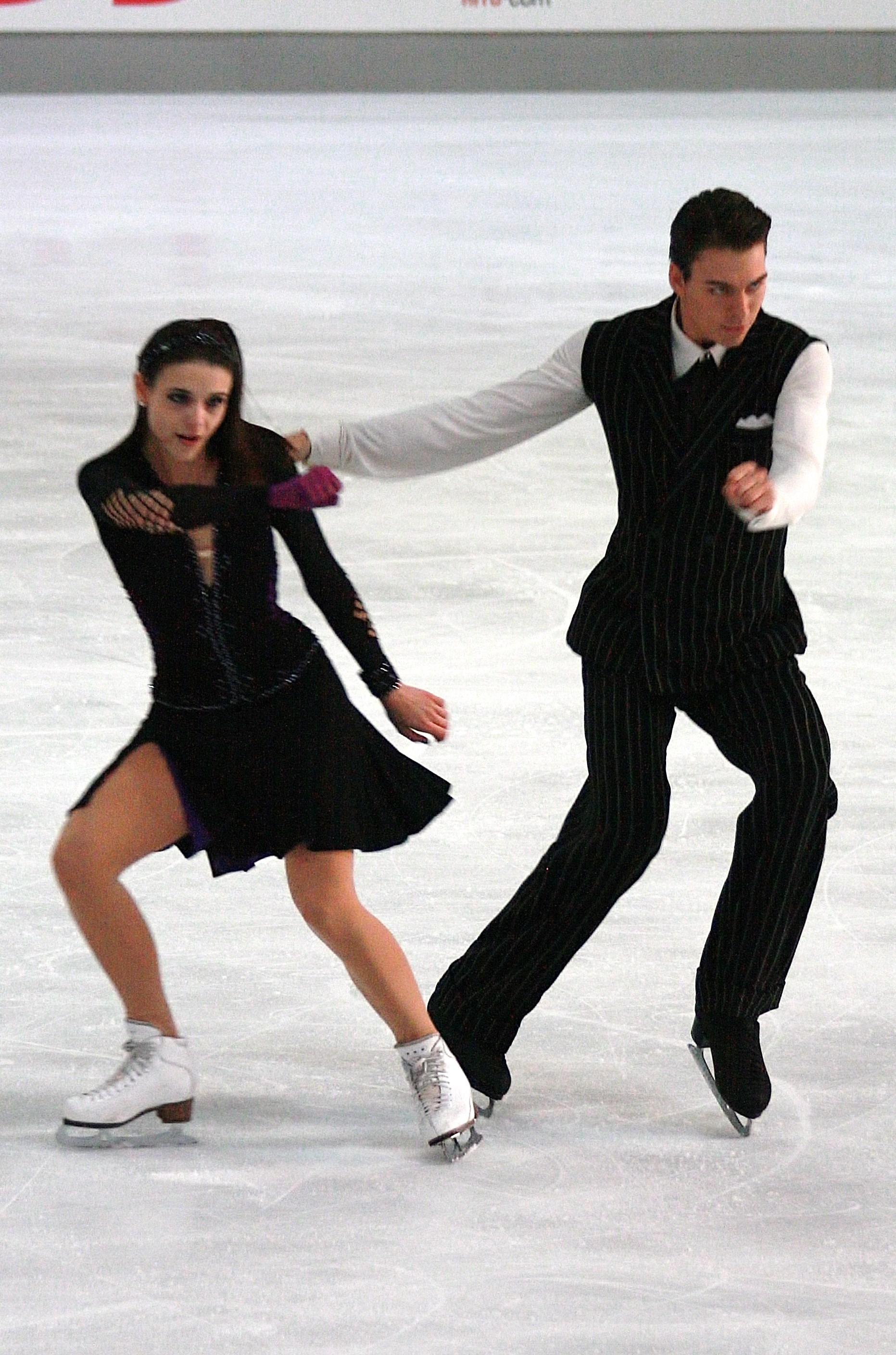
From left to right: Adam Hagara, five-time Slovak champion in men's singles; Nicole Rajičová, five-time Slovak champion in women's singles; and Federica Testa and Lukáš Csölley, four-time Slovak champions in ice dance

=== Men's singles ===
Senior men's event medalists
Year	Location	Gold	Silver	Bronze	Ref.
1994	Banská Bystrica	Rastislav Vnučko	Ladislav Vince	Mr. Miškolczy	
1995	Nitra	Róbert Kažimír	Rastislav Vnučko	No other competitors	
1996	Prešov	Róbert Kažimír	Rastislav Vnučko	Ladislav Hluchý	
1997	Bratislava	Róbert Kažimír	Ladislav Hluchý	No other competitors	
1998	Košice	Juraj Sviatko	Róbert Kažimír	Ladislav Hluchý	
1999	Ružomberok	Róbert Kažimír	Juraj Sviatko	Vladimir Futáš	
2000	Ružomberok	Juraj Sviatko	Róbert Kažimír	Peter Číž	
2001	Ružomberok	Róbert Kažimír	Juraj Sviatko	Michael Lajtar	
2002	Bratislava	Juraj Sviatko	Ivan Kinčík	Róbert Kažimír	
2003	Bratislava	Juraj Sviatko	Lukaš Kuzmiak	Ivan Kinčík	
2004	Bratislava	Juraj Sviatko	Taras Rajec	Ivan Kinčík	
2005	Ružomberok	Igor Macypura	Juraj Sviatko	Ivan Kinčík	
2006	Košice	Juraj Sviatko	Ivan Kinčík	No other competitors	
2007	(Czech Republic) Liberec	Igor Macypura	Ivan Kinčík	No other competitors	
2008	Trenčín	Igor Macypura	Jakub Štróbl	Taras Rajec	
2009	(Czech Republic) Třinec	Peter Reitmayer	Taras Rajec	Jakub Štróbl	
2010	(Poland) Cieszyn	Peter Reitmayer	No other competitors		
2011	Žilina	Jakub Štróbl	No other competitors		
2012	(Czech Republic) Ostrava	Taras Rajec	No other competitors		
2013	(Poland) Cieszyn	Marco Klepoch	No other competitors		
2014	Bratislava	Marco Klepoch	No other competitors		
2015	(Hungary) Budapest	Marco Klepoch	Jakub Kršňák	No other competitors	
2016	(Czech Republic) Třinec	Michael Neuman	Jakub Kršňák	Marco Klepoch	
2017	(Poland) Katowice	Jakub Kršňák	Michael Neuman	Marco Klepoch	
2018	Košice	Michael Neuman	Jakub Kršňák	Marco Klepoch	
2019	(Hungary) Budapest	Marco Klepoch	Michael Neuman	No other competitors	
2020	(Czech Republic) Ostrava	Michael Neuman	Marco Klepoch	No other competitors	
2021	(Poland) Cieszyn	Marco Klepoch	No other competitors		
2022	Spišská Nová Ves	Adam Hagara	Michael Neuman	No other competitors	
2023	(Hungary) Budapest	Adam Hagara	No other competitors		
2024	(Czech Republic) Turnov	Adam Hagara	Lukáš Václavík	No other competitors	
2025	(Poland) Cieszyn	Adam Hagara	Lukáš Václavík	No other competitors	
2026	Prešov	Adam Hagara	Jozef Čurma	No other competitors	

=== Women's singles ===
Senior women's event medalists
Year	Location	Gold	Silver	Bronze	Ref.
1994	Banská Bystrica	Zaneta Štefániková	Zuzana Babiaková (née Paurová)	Hedviga Huňadyová	
1995	Nitra	Zuzana Babiaková (née Paurová)	Eva Babiaková	Ingrid Reptiková	
1996	Prešov	Zuzana Babiaková (née Paurová)	Zaneta Štefániková	Ingrid Reptiková	
1997	Bratislava	Zuzana Babiaková (née Paurová)	Eva Babiaková	Zuzana Okoličányiová	
1998	Košice	Zuzana Babiaková (née Paurová)	Zuzana Buráková	Eva Babiaková	
1999	Ružomberok	Zuzana Babiaková (née Paurová)	Eva Babiaková	Zuzana Nagyová	
2000	Ružomberok	Diana Janošťáková	Silvia Končoková	Tatiana Ďurkovská	
2001	Ružomberok	Zuzana Babiaková (née Paurová)	Diana Janošťáková	Lucia Starovičová	
2002	Bratislava	Zuzana Babiaková (née Paurová)	Diana Janošťáková	Lucia Starovičová	
2003	Bratislava	Zuzana Babiaková (née Paurová)	Simona Ocelková	Lucia Starovičová	
2004	Bratislava	Zuzana Babiaková (née Paurová)	Jacqueline Belenyesiová	Lucia Starovičová	
2005	Ružomberok	Jacqueline Belenyesiová	Silvia Končoková	Lucia Starovičová	
2006	Košice	Jacqueline Belenyesiová	Silvia Končoková	Viktoria Filipová	
2007	(Czech Republic) Liberec	Radka Bártová	Jacqueline Belenyesiová	Katarína Babalová	
2008	Trenčín	Jacqueline Belenyesiová	Radka Bártová	Ivana Reitmayerová	
2009	(Czech Republic) Třinec	Ivana Reitmayerová	Alexandra Kunová	Radka Bártová	
2010	(Poland) Cieszyn	Ivana Reitmayerová	Alexandra Kunová	Karolína Sýkorová	
2011	Žilina	Alexandra Kunová	Karolína Sýkorová	Karolína Gútová	
2012	(Czech Republic) Ostrava	Monika Simančíková	Nicole Rajičová	Alexandra Kunová	
2013	(Poland) Cieszyn	Nicole Rajičová	Alexandra Kunová	Dominika Murcková	
2014	Bratislava	Bronislava Dobiášová	Monika Simančíková	Alexandra Kunová	
2015	(Hungary) Budapest	Nicole Rajičová	Bronislava Dobiášová	Alexandra Kunová	
2016	(Czech Republic) Třinec	Nicole Rajičová	Alexandra Hagarová	Nina Letenayová	
2017	(Poland) Katowice	Nicole Rajičová	Bronislava Dobiášová	Alexandra Hagarová	
2018	Košice	Silvia Hugec	Nina Letenayová	Maria Sofia Pucherová	
2019	(Hungary) Budapest	Nicole Rajičová	Silvia Hugec	No other competitors	
2020	(Czech Republic) Ostrava	Ema Doboszová	Claudia Mifkovicová	Bianca Srbecká	
2021	(Poland) Cieszyn	Nicole Rajičová	Alexandra Michaela Filcová	Ema Doboszová	
2022	Spišská Nová Ves	Ema Doboszová	Alexandra Michaela Filcová	No other competitors	
2023	(Hungary) Budapest	Alexandra Michaela Filcová	Ema Doboszová	Vanesa Šelmeková	
2024	(Czech Republic) Turnov	Vanesa Šelmeková	Ema Doboszová	Simona Kolenáková	
2025	(Poland) Cieszyn	Vanesa Šelmeková	Ema Doboszová	Terézia Pócsová	
2026	Prešov	Vanesa Šelmeková	Terézia Pócsová	Simona Koleňáková	

=== Pairs ===
Senior pairs event medalists
Year	Location	Gold	Silver	Bronze	Ref.
No pairs competitors prior to 1997
1997	Bratislava	Oľga Beständigová; Jozef Beständig	No other competitors		
1998	Košice	Oľga Beständigová; Jozef Beständig	No other competitors		
1999	Ružomberok	Oľga Beständigová; Jozef Beständig	No other competitors		
2000	Ružomberok	Oľga Beständigová; Jozef Beständig	No other competitors		
2001	Ružomberok	Oľga Beständigová; Jozef Beständig	Diana Rišková; Vladimir Futáš	No other competitors	
2002	Bratislava	Oľga Beständigová; Jozef Beständig	Maria Guerassimenko; Vladimir Futáš	No other competitors	
2003	Bratislava	No pairs competitors			
2004	Bratislava	Milica Brozović; Vladimir Futáš	No other competitors		
2005	Ružomberok	Oľga Beständigová; Jozef Beständig	Milica Brozović; Vladimir Futáš	No other competitors	
2006–08	No pairs competitors				
2009	(Czech Republic) Třinec	Gabriela Čermanová; Martin Hanulák	No other competitors		
2010	(Poland) Cieszyn	Gabriela Čermanová; Martin Hanulák	No other competitors		
No pairs competitors since 2010

=== Ice dance ===
Senior ice dance event medalists
Year	Location	Gold	Silver	Bronze	Ref.
1994	Banská Bystrica	Viera Poráčová; Pavol Poráč	No other competitors		
1995	Nitra	Zuzana Babušíková; Marian Mésároš	No other competitors		
1996	Prešov	Zuzana Babušíková; Marian Mésároš	No other competitors		
1997	Bratislava	Bibiana Poliačková; Marian Mésároš	No other competitors		
1998	Košice	Zuzana Merzová; Tomas Morbacher	Zuzana Ďurkovská; Marian Mésároš	No other competitors	
1999	Ružomberok	Zuzana Ďurkovská; Marian Mésároš	No other competitors		
2000	Ružomberok	Zuzana Ďurkovská; Marian Mésároš	No other competitors		
2001	Ružomberok	Zuzana Ďurkovská; Marian Mésároš	No other competitors		
2002	Bratislava	Zuzana Ďurkovská; Ota Jandeisek	No other competitors		
2003	Bratislava	No ice dance competitors			
2004	Bratislava	Ivana Dlhopolčeková; Hynek Bílek	No other competitors		
2005	Ružomberok	Barbora Hrubanová; Tomáš Kunya	No other competitors		
2006–08	No ice dance competitors				
2009	(Czech Republic) Třinec	Nikola Višňová; Lukáš Csölley	No other competitors		
2010	(Poland) Cieszyn	Nikola Višňová; Lukáš Csölley	No other competitors		
2011	Žilina	Nikola Višňová; Lukáš Csölley	No other competitors		
2012	(Czech Republic) Ostrava	Federica Testa; Lukáš Csölley	No other competitors		
2013	(Poland) Cieszyn	No ice dance competitors			
2014	Bratislava	Federica Testa; Lukáš Csölley	No other competitors		
2015	(Hungary) Budapest	Federica Testa; Lukáš Csölley	No other competitors		
2016	(Czech Republic) Třinec	Federica Testa; Lukáš Csölley	No other competitors		
2017	(Poland) Katowice	Lucie Myslivečková; Lukáš Csölley	No other competitors		
2018	Košice	Lucie Myslivečková; Lukáš Csölley	No other competitors		
2019–21	No ice dance competitors				
2022	Spišská Nová Ves	Mária Sofia Pucherová; Nikita Lysak	No other competitors		
2023	(Hungary) Budapest	Anna Simova; Kirill Aksenov	Mária Sofia Pucherová; Nikita Lysak	No other competitors	
2024	(Czech Republic) Turnov	Mária Sofia Pucherová; Nikita Lysak	Anna Simova; Kirill Aksenov	No other competitors	
2025	(Poland) Cieszyn	Mária Sofia Pucherová; Nikita Lysak	No other competitors		
2026	Prešov	No ice dance competitors			

== Junior medalists ==
=== Men's singles ===
Junior men's event medalists
Year	Location	Gold	Silver	Bronze	Ref.
2006	Košice	Taras Rajec	Jakub Štróbl	Marek Dlugoš	
2007	(Czech Republic) Liberec	Taras Rajec	Jakub Štróbl	Peter Hebr	
2008	Bratislava	Jakub Štróbl	Peter Reitmayer	Marek Dlugoš	
2009	Bratislava	Peter Reitmayer	Jakub Štróbl	Timotej Celes	
2010	Banská Bystrica	Jakub Štróbl	Péter Novella	Timotej Celes	
2011	Žilina	Péter Novella	Timotej Celes	No other competitors	
2012	Bratislava	Péter Novella	Marco Klepoch	Timotej Celes	
2013	Bratislava	Marco Klepoch	Timotej Celes	Jakub Krsnak	
2014	Košice	Marco Klepoch	Jakub Kršňák	No other competitors	
2015	Púchov	Marco Klepoch	Jakub Kršňák	No other competitors	
2016	Ružomberok	Marco Klepoch	Jakub Kršňák	Simon Fukas	
2017	Košice	Jakub Kršňák	Simon Fukas	Bohuš Hrnek	
2018	Nové Mesto nad Váhom	Jakub Kršňák	Bohuš Hrnek	No other competitors	
2019	Pezinok	No junior men's competitors			
2020	Bratislava	Adam Hagara	Marko Piliar	Kristian Kozma	
2021	No competitions due to the COVID-19 pandemic				
2022	Košice	Lukáš Václavík	Marko Piliar	Oliver Kubacak	
2023	Liptovský Mikuláš	Lukáš Václavík	Dmitrij Rudenko	Jakub Galbavy	
2024	Nové Mesto nad Váhom	Dmitrij Rudenko	Jozef Čurma	No other competitors	
2025	Prešov	Alex Valky	Jozef Čurma	Jakub Čurma	
2026	Humenné	Dominik Drnzick	Niccolo Boeris	Viliam Sabovcik	

=== Women's singles ===
Junior women's event medalists
Year	Location	Gold	Silver	Bronze	Ref.
2006	Košice	Radka Bártová	Ivana Reitmayerová	Katarina Babalová	
2007	(Czech Republic) Liberec	Ivana Reitmayerová	Lujza Halásová	Eva Pallová	
2008	Bratislava	Ivana Reitmayerová	Alexandra Kunová	Radka Bártová	
2009	Bratislava	Karolina Sykorová	Radka Bártová	Julia Reptová	
2010	Banská Bystrica	Karolina Sykorová	Alexandra Kunová	Michaela Sabolcaková	
2011	Žilina	Monika Simančíková	Alexandra Kunová	Erika Viteková	
2012	Bratislava	Alexandra Kunová	Nicole Rajičová	Dominika Murcková	
2013	Bratislava	Katarina Brosková	Dominika Murcková	Patricia Misciková	
2014	Košice	Miroslava Hriňáková	Sabina Drábová	Dominika Murcková	
2015	Púchov	Bronislava Dobiášová	Alexandra Hagarová	Nina Letenayová	
2016	Ružomberok	Alexandra Hagarová	Bronislava Dobiášová	Nina Letenayová	
2017	Košice	Alexandra Hagarová	Silvia Hugec	Nina Letenayová	
2018	Nové Mesto nad Váhom	Nina Letenayová	Maria Sofia Pucherová	Claudia Mifkovicová	
2019	Pezinok	Maria Sofia Pucherová	Alexandra Michaela Filcová	Ema Doboszová	
2020	Bratislava	Alexandra Filcová	Claudia Mifkovicová	Linda Lengyelová	
2021	No competition due to the COVID-19 pandemic				
2022	Košice	Vanesa Selmeková	Simona Kolenaková	Tereza Pocsová	
2023	Liptovský Mikuláš	Olivia Lengyelová	Vanesa Selmeková	Tereza Pocsová	
2024	Nové Mesto nad Váhom	Olivia Lengyelová	Lucia Jacková	Tereza Pocsová	
2025	Prešov	Olivia Lengyelová	Alica Lengyelová	Emma Maria Cerkalová	
2026	Humenné	Alica Lengyelová	Olivia Lengyelová	Lucia Jacková	

=== Pairs ===
Junior pairs event medalists
Year	Location	Gold	Silver	Bronze	Ref.
2006	Košice	Kristína Kabátová; Martin Hanulák	No other competitors		
2007	(Czech Republic) Liberec	Kristína Kabátová; Martin Hanulák	No other competitors		
2008	Bratislava	Gabriela Čermanová; Martin Hanulák	No other competitors		
2009	Bratislava	Gabriela Čermanová; Martin Hanulák	No other competitors		
2010–18	No junior pairs competitors				
2019	(Hungary) Budapest	Teresa Zendulková; Simon Fukas	No other competitors		
2020	(Czech Republic) Ostrava	No junior pairs competitors			
2021	(Poland) Cieszyn	Margareta Musková; Oliver Kubacák	No other competitors		
2022	Spišská Nová Ves	Margareta Musková; Oliver Kubacák	No other competitors		
2023	(Hungary) Budapest	Nikola Sitková; Oliver Kubacák	No other competitors		
2024	(Czech Republic) Turnov	Nikola Sitková; Oliver Kubacák	No other competitors		
2025	(Poland) Cieszyn	Laura Hecková; Alex Valky	No other competitors		
2026	Prešov	No junior pairs competitors			

=== Ice dance ===
Junior ice dance event medalists
Year	Location	Gold	Silver	Bronze	Ref.
2006	Košice	No junior ice dance competitors			
2007	(Czech Republic) Liberec	Nikola Višňová; Lukáš Csölley	No other competitors		
2008	Trenčín	Nikola Višňová; Lukáš Csölley	No other competitors		
2009	Bratislava	Nikola Višňová; Lukáš Csölley	No other competitors		
2010	Banská Bystrica	Nikola Višňová; Lukáš Csölley	Natalia Jancoseková; Kirill Konovalov	No other competitors	
2011	Žilina	Nikola Višňová; Lukáš Csölley	No other competitors		
2012–21	No junior ice dance competitors				
2022	Spišská Nová Ves	Anna Simova; Kirill Aksenov	No other competitors		
2023–24	No junior ice dance competitors				
2025	(Poland) Cieszyn	Aneta Vaclaviková; Ivan Morozov	Lucia Stefanovová; Jacopo Boeris	No other competitors	
2026	Prešov	Lucia Stefanovová; Jacopo Boeris	No other competitors		

== Records ==
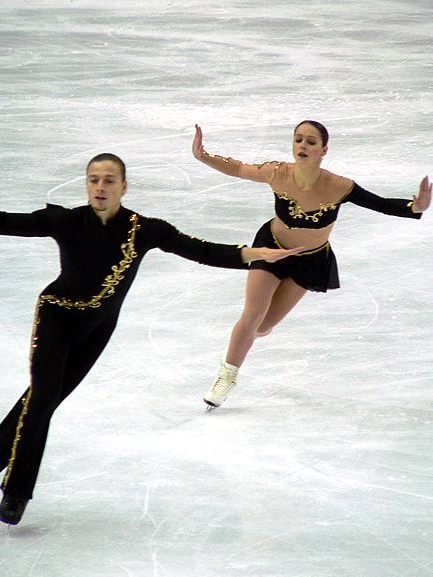
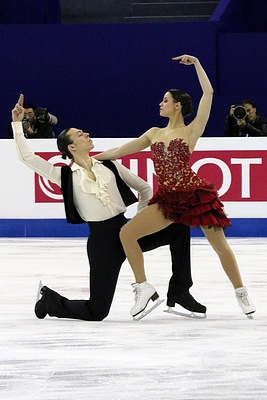
From left to right: Oľga Beständigová and Jozef Beständig won eight Slovak Championship titles in pair skating, while Lukáš Csölley won eight Slovak Championship titles in ice dance, four of which were with Federica Testa.

Records
Discipline	Most championship titles			
Discipline	Skater(s)	No.	Years	Ref.
Men's singles	Juraj Sviatko	6	1998; 2000; 2002–04; 2006	
Women's singles	Zuzana Babiaková (née Paurová)	9	1995–99; 2001–04	
Pairs	Oľga Beständigová; Jozef Beständig	7	1997–2002; 2005	
Ice dance	Lukáš Csölley; (Note: Lukáš Csölley won two championship titles while partnered with Nikola Višňová (2009–11), four with Federica Testa (2012, 2014–16), and two with Lucie Myslivečková (2017–18).)	9	2009–12; 2014–18	
