= Taras Rajec =

Ukrainian-born former figure skater (born 1988)

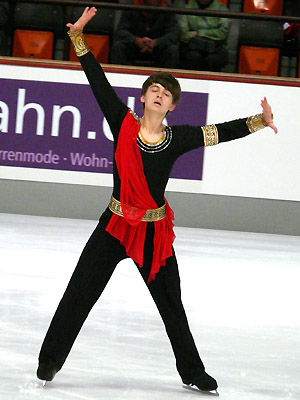
- Rajec at the 2007 Nebelhorn Trophy

Personal information
- Born: 5 June 1988 (age 38) Lviv, Ukrainian SSR, Soviet Union
- Height: 1.79 m (5 ft 10 1/2 in)

Figure skating career
- Country: Slovakia
- Discipline: Men's singles
- Began skating: 1993
- Retired: c. 2012

Medal record
Slovak Championships
Gold medal – first place	2012 Ostrava	Singles
Silver medal – second place	2004 Bratislava	Singles
Silver medal – second place	2009 Třinec	Singles
Bronze medal – third place	2008 Trenčin	Singles

Taras Rajec (born 5 June 1988 in Lviv) is a Ukrainian-born former figure skater who competed internationally for Slovakia. He is the 2012 Slovak national champion.

== Programs ==
Season	Short program	Free skating
2011–12	Paganini by Maksim Mrvica	Desperado
2006–07	Paganini by Maksim Mrvica	Alexander by Vangelis
2005–06	Tango de Buenos Aires	Alexander by Vangelis
2004–05	Tango de Buenos Aires	Hopak
2002–03	Planet of the Apes by Danny Elfman	Pearl Harbor by Hans Zimmer

== Competitive highlights ==
- JGP – Event of the ISU Junior Grand Prix Series

Competition placements at senior level
Season	2003–04	2005–06	2006–07	2007–08	2008–09	2011–12
World Championships						43rd
Slovak Championships	2nd			3rd	2nd	1st
Belgian Championships (guest)				3rd		
Bavarian Open						11th
Challenge Cup						14th
Golden Spin of Zagreb			6th			
Grand Prix SNP						1st
Nebelhorn Trophy				18th		
Ondrej Nepela Memorial	10th	18th	4th	14th	14th	

Competition placements at junior level
Season	2002–03	2003–04	2004–05	2005–06	2006–07
World Junior Championships			27th	29th	35th
Slovak Championships			1st	1st	1st
JGP Croatia				14th	
JGP Czech Republic					13th
JGP Netherlands					13th
JGP Serbia	16th				
JGP Slovakia	20th	21st		14th	
Grand Prize SNP	7th	2nd			
Gardena Spring Trophy	14th				
