= Jozef Beständig =

Slovak pair skater

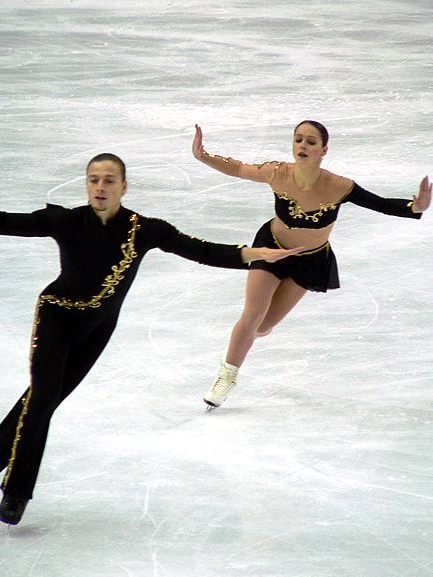
- Beständigová/Beständig at the 2005 European Championships

Personal information
- Born: 27 February 1978 (age 48) Bratislava, Czechoslovakia
- Height: 1.74 m (5 ft 9 in)

Figure skating career
- Country: Slovakia
- Discipline: Pair skating
- Began skating: 1981
- Retired: 2005

Medal record
Slovak Championships
Gold medal – first place	2001 Ružomberok	Pairs
Gold medal – first place	2002	Pairs
Gold medal – first place	2005 Ružomberok	Pairs

Jozef Beständig (born 27 February 1978) is a Slovak former competitive pair skater. Competing with his sister Oľga Beständigová, he won nine senior international medals and eight Slovak national titles. They competed at the 2002 Winter Olympics, five World Championships, and seven European Championships, placing as high as 7th (2001 Europeans).

== Personal life ==
Born on 27 February 1978 in Bratislava, Czechoslovakia, Jozef Beständig is the elder brother of Oľga Beständigová. After retiring from skating, he became a financial counselor.

== Skating career ==
Beständig represented Slovakia with Beständigová. Their first ISU Championship was the 1997 Europeans in Paris; they finished last (17th). The following season, they placed 12th at the 1998 Europeans in Milan and 18th at the 1998 Worlds in Minneapolis.

Beständigová/Beständig achieved their highest ISU Championship result, 7th, at the 2001 Europeans in Bratislava. They would go on to qualify for the 2002 Winter Olympics in Salt Lake City, Utah, where they finished 17th.

Beständigová retired from competition following the 2001–02 season but returned to compete with her brother again for the 2004–05 season. The pair placed 8th at the 2005 European Championships in Turin and 15th at the 2005 World Championships in Moscow. They then ended their partnership.

== Programs ==
(with Beständigová)

Season	Short program	Free skating
2004–2005	Christmas in Sarajevo by Trans-Siberian Orchestra	The Fifth Element by Éric Serra
2001–2002	Music by Michael Jackson	The Fifth Element by Éric Serra
2000–2001	Slowly to the Sun by This is Kevin	The Fifth Element by Éric Serra

== Results ==
GP: Champions Series/Grand Prix

(with Beständigová)

International
Event	95–96	96–97	97–98	98–99	99–00	00–01	01–02	04–05
Olympics							17th	
Worlds			18th	17th	18th	22nd		15th
Europeans		17th	12th	10th	12th	7th	13th	8th
GP Skate America			8th					
GP Sparkassen						9th		
GP Trophée Lalique				7th				
Czech Skate			4th					
Golden Spin				2nd	2nd		6th	
Karl Schäfer			10th	3rd				
Nebelhorn Trophy				8th	9th			
Ondrej Nepela			4th	2nd	2nd		1st	
Skate Israel				3rd	3rd			
Tallinn Cup				3rd				
Grand Prize SNP		3rd J.						
National
Slovak Champ.	1st	1st	1st	1st	1st	1st	1st	1st
