= Ivana Reitmayerová =

Slovak figure skater

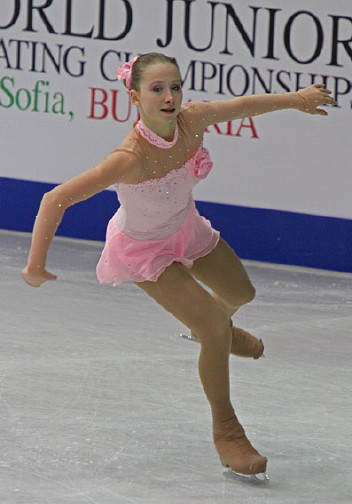
- Reitmayerova at the 2009 World Junior Championships.

Personal information
- Born: 4 May 1992 (age 34) Košice, Czechoslovakia
- Home town: Bratislava, Slovakia
- Height: 1.64 m (5 ft 5 in)

Figure skating career
- Country: Slovakia
- Discipline: Women's singles
- Coach: Iveta Reitmayerová
- Skating club: SKP Bratislava
- Began skating: 1997

Medal record
Slovak Championships
Gold medal – first place	2009 Třinec	Singles
Gold medal – first place	2010 Cieszyn	Singles
Bronze medal – third place	2008 Trenčín	Singles

Ivana Reitmayerová (born 4 May 1992) is a Slovak former competitive figure skater. She is the 2008 Ondrej Nepela Memorial champion, 2008 Triglav Trophy silver medalist, and a two-time (2009, 2010) Slovak national champion. She competed at the 2010 Winter Olympics in Vancouver.

Reitmayerová began competing internationally on the junior level in 2005 and on the senior level the following year. She was coached by her mother, Iveta. Her brother, Peter Reitmayer, also competed in figure skating.

== Programs ==
Season	Short program	Free skating
2010–11	Dark Eyes	Sad Piano; Tango
2009–10	The Memories of a Lover	Oceano by Roberto Cacciapaglia; Harbinger by Mike Oldfield
2008–09	Yunona and Avos by Alexei Rybnikov arranged by Svetlana Pikous	Nostalgia by Yanni
2007–08	Capone by Ronan Hardiman	Croatian Rhapsody; Wonderland by Maksim Mrvica
2006–07	Forrest Gump by Alan Silvestri	The Mummy

== Competitive highlights ==
International
Event	05–06	06–07	07–08	08–09	09–10	10–11	11–12	14–15
Olympics					28th			
Worlds			26th	14th	25th			
Europeans				11th	15th			
Golden Spin			16th					
Hamar Trophy								1st
Nebelhorn Trophy			12th					
Nepela Memorial		3rd	5th	1st	9th			
Triglav Trophy			2nd					
International: Junior
Junior Worlds		26th	15th	8th				
JGP Croatia	20th							
JGP Czech Rep.		15th						
JGP Italy				6th				
JGP Netherlands		14th						
JGP Poland	21st				10th			
JGP Romania			10th					
JGP Turkey					17th			
JGP U.K.			11th	9th				
Gardena		2nd J						
Grand Prize SNP	1st J	2nd J						
National
Slovak Champ.	2nd J	1st J	3rd	1st	1st		5th	
JGP = Junior Grand Prix; J = Junior level
