= Agata Kryger =

Polish figure skater

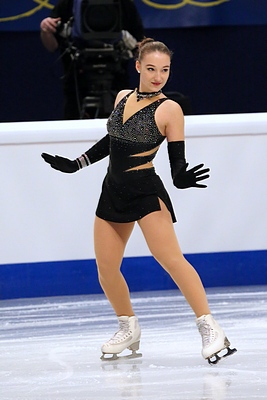

Personal information
- Born: 29 November 1997 (age 28) Toruń, Poland
- Height: 1.60 m (5 ft 3 in)

Figure skating career
- Country: Poland
- Coach: Scott Davis, Jeff Langdon
- Skating club: MKS Axel Torun
- Began skating: 2002
- Retired: 2016

Agata Kryger (born 29 November 1997) is a Polish former competitive figure skater. She is the 2013 Warsaw Cup champion and a three-time Polish national champion (2013–15).

== Career ==
Kryger debuted on the ISU Junior Grand Prix series in 2011. In the 2012–13 season, she won her first senior national title. She was sent to Milan, Italy to compete at her first World Junior Championships, but was eliminated after placing 36th in the short program.

In the 2013–14 season, Kryger returned to the JGP series, placing 16th in Košice, Slovakia and 11th in Gdańsk, Poland. In November 2013, making her senior international debut, she won the Warsaw Cup ahead of Camilla Gjersem and Elizaveta Ukolova. After winning her second national title, Kryger was assigned to her first European Championships. Ranked 23rd in the short program, she advanced to the free skate and finished 21st overall at the event in Budapest, Hungary. She did not reach the free skate at the 2014 World Junior Championships in Sofia, Bulgaria, having placed 33rd in the short program. Dorota and Mariusz Siudek coached Kryger in Toruń until the end of the 2013–14 season.

In 2014, Kryger began training in Calgary, Alberta, Canada under the guidance of Scott Davis and Jeff Langdon.

== Programs ==
Season	Short program	Free skating
2014–2016	James Bond music	Ladies in Lavender by Nigel Hess; In the Hall of the Mountain King (from Peer Gynt) by Edvard Grieg
2013–2014	Seraphin	Ladies in Lavender by Nigel Hess; In the Hall of the Mountain King (from Peer Gynt) by Edvard Grieg
2012–2013	Seraphin	Moonlight Sonata by Ludwig van Beethoven

== Competitive highlights ==
CS: Challenger Series; JGP: Junior Grand Prix

International
Event	11–12	12–13	13–14	14–15
Europeans			21st	38th
Golden Spin			11th	
Toruń Cup			1st	
Warsaw Cup			1st	
International: Junior
Junior Worlds		36th	33rd	
JGP Estonia	19th			
JGP Poland	18th		11th	
JGP Slovakia			16th	
EYOF		10th		
Cup of Nice	5th J			
Toruń Cup	2nd J	2nd J		
Warsaw Cup	13th J	4th J		
National
Polish Champ.	2nd	1st	1st	1st
