= Yuka Nagai =

Japanese figure skater

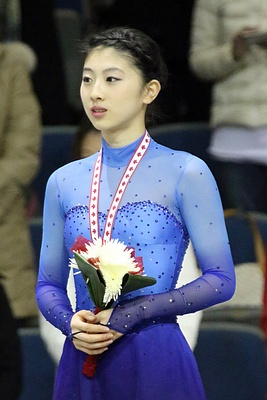
- Nagai in 2015

Personal information
- Native name: 永井 優香
- Born: November 30, 1998 (age 27) Tokyo, Japan
- Height: 1.62 m (5 ft 4 in)

Figure skating career
- Country: Japan
- Coach: Makoto Nakata
- Skating club: Waseda University
- Began skating: 2005
- Retired: December 15, 2020

Yuka Nagai (永井 優香, Nagai Yūka; born November 30, 1998) is a Japanese former figure skater. She is the 2015 Skate Canada International bronze medalist and 2016 Bavarian Open champion. She has finished in the top ten at two ISU Championships.

== Career ==
=== Early career ===
Nagai finished 18th at the 2012 Japanese Junior Championships. Her international debut came at the start of the 2012–13 season, at the 2012 Asian Trophy. She placed 7th at her ISU Junior Grand Prix (JGP) event in Austria, and 18th at the Japanese Junior Championships.

In 2013–14, Nagai finished 8th at her JGP event in Latvia and 19th at the Japanese Junior Championships.

=== 2014–15 season ===
During the 2014–15 JGP series, Nagai won silver medals in Ljubljana, Slovenia and Nagoya, Japan. Her results qualified her for the Junior Grand Prix Final, held in December 2014 in Barcelona, Spain, where she placed 5th.

Nagai placed 4th at the 2015 Japanese Championships and won the bronze medal at the junior event, finishing behind Wakaba Higuchi and Kaori Sakamoto. She was selected to compete at the 2015 Four Continents where she placed 6th in her senior international debut. She closed her season by finishing 7th at the 2015 World Junior Championships.

=== 2015–16 season ===
Nagai started her season on the ISU Challenger Series (CS), placing 6th at the 2015 Ondrej Nepela Trophy.

Making her debut on the senior level of the ISU Grand Prix, Nagai won bronze at 2015 Skate Canada International.

=== 2016–17 season ===
Struggling with her jumps even during practice, Nagai competed at two Grand Prix events; she placed low at both. At the 2016 Japan Championships, she finished in 24th, an experience that she said was like "hitting rock bottom". Removed from the national team, she began university and contemplated how to move forward with skating: "If I was going to do it, I wanted to be at the very top. But when I thought about whether I could make it back to the world stage, I ended up making limits for myself."

== Post-competitive career ==
Nagai graduated from Waseda University. She now works at a company providing non-life insurance.

== Programs ==
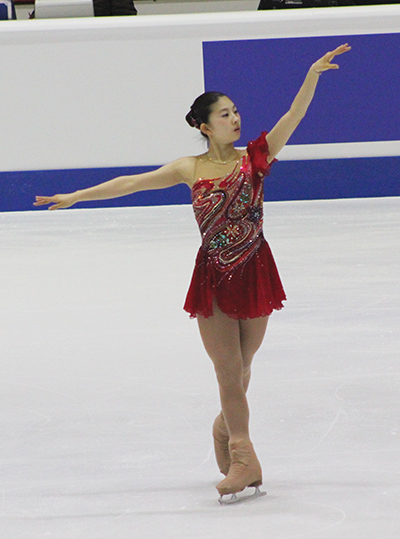
Nagai in 2015

Season	Short program	Free skating	Exhibition
2020–2021	Elisabeth choreo. by Akiko Suzuki	East of Eden (1981 miniseries) by Lee Holdridge choreo. by Kenji Miyamoto	
2019–2020	Byakuya wo Iku (from Byakuyakō) by Shin Kono choreo. by Akiko Suzuki	Adiós Nonino by Astor Piazzolla choreo. by Kenji Miyamoto	
2018–2019	Riverdance by Bill Whelan choreo. by Misao Sato	Cinderella by Sergei Prokofiev choreo. by Akiko Suzuki	
2017–2018			
2016–2017	Fantasy for Violin and Orchestra (from Ladies in Lavender) by Joshua Bell	The Ludlows (from Legends of the Fall) by James Horner	
2015–2016	Madama Butterfly by Giacomo Puccini choreo. by Kenji Miyamoto; Piano Concerto No. 3 by Sergei Rachmaninoff choreo. by Kenji Miyamoto	August's Rhapsody (from August Rush) by Mark Mancina choreo. by Shae-Lynn Bourne	Skinny Love performed by Birdy
2014–2015	East of Eden (1981 miniseries) by Lee Holdridge choreo. by Shae-Lynn Bourne	Introduction and Rondo Capriccioso by Camille Saint-Saëns choreo. by Megumu Seki	Skinny Love performed by Birdy
2013–2014	Violin Concerto by Pyotr I. Tchaikovsky	Violin Muse by Johann Sebastian Bach	
2012–2013	Liebesträume by Franz Liszt	Polovtsian Dances (from Prince Igor) by Alexander Borodin	

== Competitive highlights ==
GP: Grand Prix; CS: Challenger Series; JGP: Junior Grand Prix

International
Event	08–09	09–10	10–11	11–12	12–13	13–14	14–15	15–16	16–17	17–18	18–19	19–20	20–21
Four Continents							6th						
GP France									10th				
GP Rostelecom								8th					
GP Skate Canada								3rd	11th				
CS Ondrej Nepela								6th					
Bavarian Open								1st					
International: Junior
Junior Worlds							7th						
JGP Final							5th						
JGP Austria					8th								
JGP Japan							2nd						
JGP Latvia						8th							
JGP Slovenia							2nd						
Asian Trophy					3rd								
National
Japan							4th	7th	24th	22nd	24th	9th	24th
Japan Junior				18th	18th	19th	3rd						
Japan Novice	17th B	18th B	17th A	3rd A									
TBD = Assigned; WD = Withdrew

== Detailed results ==
=== Senior ===
2020–21 season
Date	Event	SP	FS	Total
December 24–27, 2020	2020–21 Japan Championships	18; 58.99	24; 87.95	24; 146.94
2019–20 season
Date	Event	SP	FS	Total
December 18–22, 2019	2019–20 Japan Championships	8; 64.78	12; 109.10	9; 173.88
2018–19 season
Date	Event	SP	FS	Total
December 20–24, 2018	2018–19 Japan Championships	24; 49.59	24; 78.88	24; 128.47
2017–18 season
Date	Event	SP	FS	Total
December 21–24, 2017	2017–18 Japan Championships	20; 55.25	24; 97.01	22; 152.26
2016-17 season
Date	Event	SP	FS	Total
22–25 December 2016	2016–17 Japan Championships	19; 53.23	24; 78.17	24; 131.40
November 11–13, 2016	2016 Trophée de France	12; 52.41	9; 107.08	10; 159.49
28–30 October 2016	2016 Skate Canada International	11; 40.39	7; 107.17	11; 147.56
2015–16 season
Date	Event	SP	FS	Total
December 24–27, 2015	2015–16 Japan Championships	7; 60.42	6; 118.44	7; 178.86
November 20–22, 2015	2015 Rostelecom Cup	9; 53.19	6; 106.43	8; 159.62
Oct. 30 – Nov. 1, 2015	2015 Skate Canada International	2; 63.35	7; 109.57	3; 172.92
October 1–3, 2015	2015 Ondrej Nepela Trophy	6; 56.74	5; 108.43	6; 165.17

=== Junior ===
2014–15 season
Date	Event	Level	SP	FS	Total
March 2–8, 2015	2015 World Junior Championships	Junior	6; 56.93	7; 107.00	7; 163.93
February 9–15, 2015	2015 Four Continents Championships	Senior	7; 56.94	8; 111.15	6; 168.09
December 26–28, 2014	2014–15 Japan Junior Championships	Senior	6; 58.00	5; 110.55	4; 168.55
December 11–14, 2014	2014–15 JGP Final	Junior	3; 62.99	5; 109.35	5; 172.34
November 22–24, 2014	2014–15 Japan Junior Championships	Junior	2; 61.49	4; 107.25	3; 168.74
September 11–14, 2014	2014 JGP Japan	Junior	5; 52.95	2; 108.70	2; 161.65
August 27–30, 2014	2014 JGP Slovenia	Junior	2; 58.92	2; 105.50	2; 164.42
2013–14 season
Date	Event	Level	SP	FS	Total
November 22–24, 2013	2013–14 Japan Junior Championships	Junior	24; 40.54	17; 85.43	19; 125.97
August 28–31, 2013	2013 JGP Latvia	Junior	9; 46.87	10; 84.81	8; 131.68
2012–13 season
Date	Event	Level	SP	FS	Total
November 17–18, 2012	2012–13 Japan Junior Championships	Junior	12; 46.72	18; 78.35	18; 125.07
September 12–15, 2012	2012 JGP Austria	Junior	8; 47.66	7; 88.14	8; 135.80
August 7–12, 2012	2012 Asian Open Trophy	Junior	3; 47.84	3; 85.06	3; 132.90
2011–12 season
Date	Event	Level	SP	FS	Total
November 25–27, 2011	2011–12 Japan Junior Championships	Junior	13; 43.86	18; 74.22	18; 118.08
