= Petr Coufal =

Czech figure skater (born 1995)

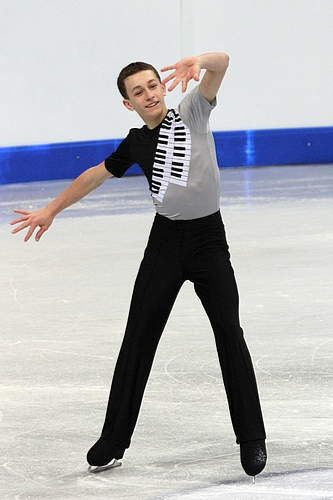
- Coufal in 2012

Personal information
- Born: 25 February 1995 (age 31) Bohumín, Czech Republic
- Home town: Ludgeřovice
- Height: 1.80 m (5 ft 11 in)

Figure skating career
- Country: Czech Republic
- Coach: Ivana Tokošová, Michael Huth
- Skating club: BKLR Cosmetic Ostrava
- Began skating: 2001

Medal record
Czech Championships
Silver medal – second place	2015 Budapest	Singles
Bronze medal – third place	2014 Bratislava	Singles

Petr Coufal (Czech pronunciation: [ˈpɛtr̩ˈtsou̯fal]; born 25 February 1995) is a Czech figure skater. He qualified to the free skate at seven ISU Championships, including the 2015 European Championships where he finished 12th. His best World Junior Championship result, tenth, came in 2014. He won a bronze medal at the 2014 Bavarian Open.

Coufal is the brother of figure skater Jana Coufalová and football player Vladimír Coufal. Their mother, Alena (née Dřevjaná), competed at the 1988 Summer Olympics for Czechoslovakia in gymnastics.

== Programs ==
Season	Short program	Free skating
2014–2015	Moonlight - Electric Cello by Steven Sharp Nelson	New World Symphony by Antonín Dvořák
2013–2014	The Last of the Mohicans by Trevor Jones, Randy Edelman	New World Symphony by Antonín Dvořák
2012–2013	The Last of the Mohicans by Trevor Jones, Randy Edelman	Black Beauty by Danny Elfman
2011–2012	Strings on the Ice by Jaroslav Sveceny, Michal Dvorak	Black Beauty by Danny Elfman
2010–2011	Strings on the Ice by Jaroslav Sveceny, Michal Dvorak	Live at the Acropolis by Yanni
2008–2010	Spanish Trumpets by Klaus Hallen	Till Eulenspiegel by Richard Strauss

== Competitive highlights ==
CS: Challenger Series; JGP: Junior Grand Prix

International
Event	2007–08	2008–09	2009–10	2010–11	2011–12	2012–13	2013–14	2014–15
Worlds								27th
Europeans								12th
CS Ice Challenge							6th	4th
CS Warsaw Cup								9th
Bavarian Open							3rd	
NRW Trophy					12th	19th		
Seibt Memorial							4th	
International: Junior
Junior Worlds		20th	21st	19th	17th	25th	10th	
JGP Austria				8th	13th	4th		
JGP Croatia						7th		
JGP Czech Rep.				7th				
JGP Germany			12th					
JGP Poland					8th			
JGP Slovakia							7th	
Merano Cup			1st J					
EYOF				1st J				
Tirnavia Ice Cup			3rd J					
National
Czech Champ.				4th	4th	WD	3rd	2nd
Czech Junior Champ.	2nd	1st	2nd	1st	1st	1st	1st	
