= Oľga Beständigová =

Slovak pair skater

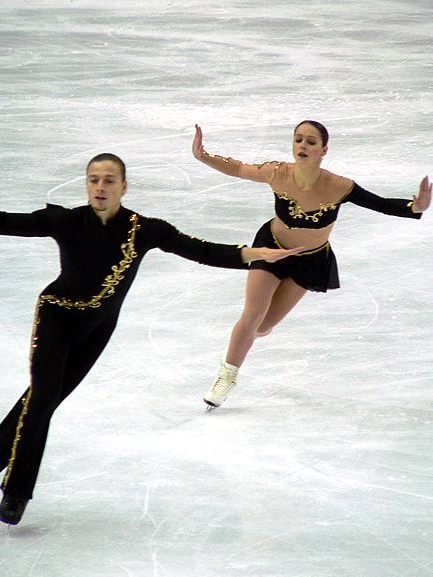
- Beständigová/Beständig at the 2005 European Championships

Personal information
- Born: 2 May 1979 (age 47) Bratislava, Czechoslovakia
- Height: 1.54 m (5 ft 1 in)

Figure skating career
- Country: Slovakia; Turkey (2013–15)
- Discipline: Pair skating
- Began skating: 1984
- Retired: 2015

Medal record
Representing Slovakia
Slovak Championships
Gold medal – first place	2001 Ružomberok	Pairs
Gold medal – first place	2002	Pairs
Gold medal – first place	2005 Ružomberok	Pairs

Oľga Beständigová (born 2 May 1979) is a Slovak former competitive pair skater. With her brother, Jozef Beständig, she won nine senior international medals and eight Slovak national titles. They competed at the 2002 Winter Olympics, five World Championships, and seven European Championships, placing as high as 7th (2001 Europeans).

Beständigová competed with her boyfriend İlhan Mansız for Turkey from 2013 to 2015.

== Career ==
=== Partnership with Beständig ===
Beständigová competed for Slovakia with her brother, Jozef Beständig. Their first ISU Championship was the 1997 Europeans in Paris; they finished last (17th). The following season, they placed 12th at the 1998 Europeans in Milan and 18th at the 1998 Worlds in Minneapolis.

Beständigová/Beständig achieved their highest ISU Championship result, 7th, at the 2001 Europeans in Bratislava. They would go on to qualify for the 2002 Winter Olympics in Salt Lake City, Utah, where they finished 17th.

Beständigová retired from competition following the 2001–02 season but returned to compete with her brother again for the 2004–05 season. The pair placed 8th at the 2005 European Championships in Turin and 15th at the 2005 World Championships in Moscow. They then ended their partnership.

=== Later career ===
Beständigová competed briefly with Vladimir Futáš in 2005 and then decided to perform in ice shows. She participated in the Turkish show Buzda Dans in the winters of 2006–07 and 2007–08. She won the second edition of the show with her partner, İlhan Mansız. In 2010, Beständigová and Mansız began training in an attempt to qualify for the pairs' event at the 2014 Winter Olympics. They initially trained in Oberstdorf and Garmisch with coaches Alexander König and Stefan Zins, and later with Doug Ladret, Don Baldwin, and Tiffany Vise in Scottsdale, Arizona. Beständigová/Mansız made their competitive debut together at the 2013 Nebelhorn Trophy, which was also the final qualifying opportunity for the Olympics. It was Beständigová's first international competition in eight years. The pair finished 19th and last in the pairs event, ending their hope of skating at the Olympic Games. Their partnership ended in 2015.

== Programs ==
=== With Mansız ===
Season	Short program	Free skating
2013–2014	To Build a Home by The Cinematic Orchestra	The Last Samurai by Hans Zimmer

=== With Beständig ===
Season	Short program	Free skating
2004–2005	Christmas in Sarajevo by Trans-Siberian Orchestra	The Fifth Element by Éric Serra
2001–2002	Music by Michael Jackson	The Fifth Element by Éric Serra
2000–2001	Slowly to the Sun by This is Kevin	The Fifth Element by Éric Serra

== Results ==
GP: Champions Series/Grand Prix; CS: Challenger Series

=== With Mansız for Turkey ===
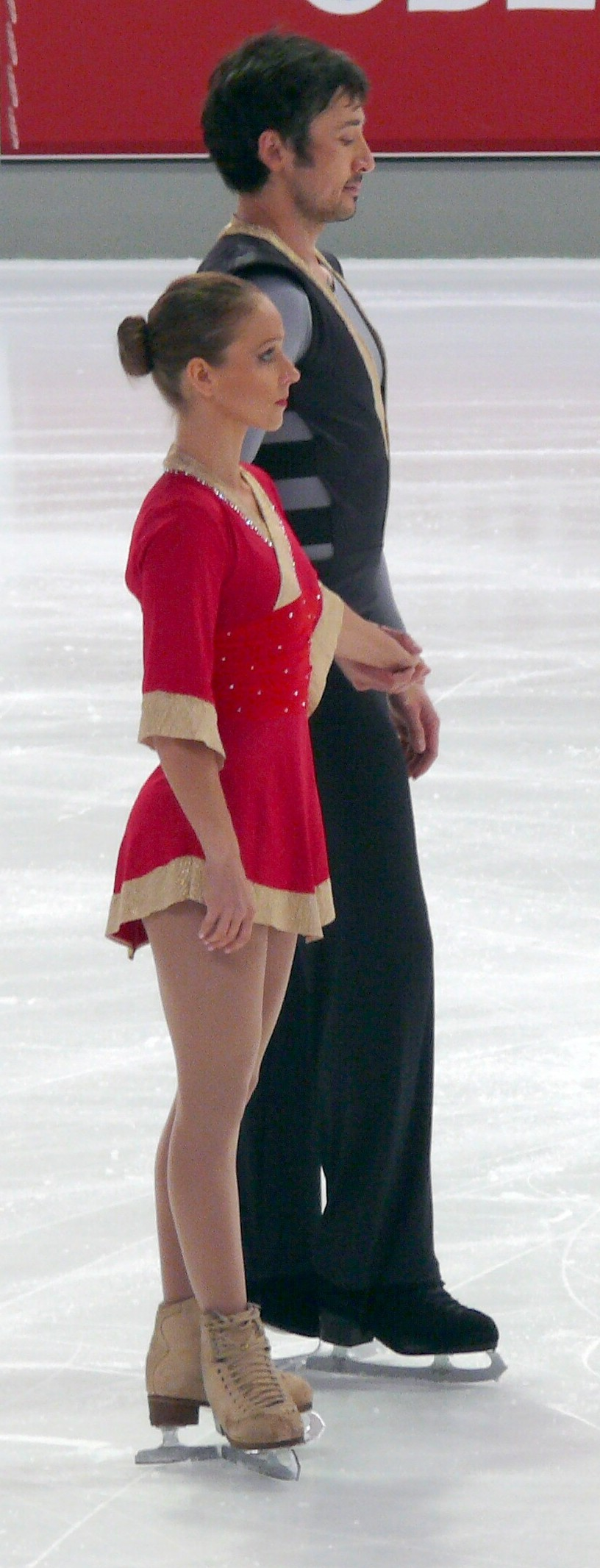
Beständigová and Mansız in 2013

International
Event	2013–14	2014–15
CS Golden Spin of Zagreb		9th
CS Ice Challenge		8th
Nebelhorn Trophy	19th	
Ondrej Nepela Memorial	5th	
Toruń Cup		5th

=== With Futáš for Slovakia ===
International
Event	2005–06
Karl Schäfer Memorial	11th

=== With Beständig for Slovakia ===
International
Event	95–96	96–97	97–98	98–99	99–00	00–01	01–02	04–05
Olympics							17th	
Worlds			18th	17th	18th	22nd		15th
Europeans		17th	12th	10th	12th	7th	13th	8th
GP Skate America			8th					
GP Sparkassen						9th		
GP Trophée Lalique				7th				
Czech Skate			4th					
Golden Spin				2nd	2nd		6th	
Karl Schäfer			10th	3rd				
Nebelhorn Trophy				8th	9th			
Ondrej Nepela			4th	2nd	2nd		1st	
Skate Israel				3rd	3rd			
Tallinn Cup				3rd				
Grand Prize SNP		3rd J.						
National
Slovak Champ.	1st	1st	1st	1st	1st	1st	1st	1st
