= Jacqueline Belenyesiová =

Slovak figure skater

Personal information
- Born: 3 December 1985 (age 40) Košice, Czechoslovakia
- Height: 1.70 m (5 ft 7 in)

Figure skating career
- Country: Slovakia
- Discipline: Women's singles
- Skating club: Kraso Centrum Košice

Medal record
Slovak Championships
Gold medal – first place	2005 Ružomberok	Singles
Gold medal – first place	2006 Košice	Singles
Gold medal – first place	2008 Trenčín	Singles
Silver medal – second place	2004 Bratislava	Singles
Silver medal – second place	2007 Liberec	Singles

Jacqueline Belenyesiová (born 3 December 1985) is a former competitive figure skater in Slovak. She is a three-time (2005–2006, 2008) Slovak national champion and competed at five ISU Championships, qualifying for the free skate at the 2006 European Championships in Lyon.

== Competitive highlights ==
JGP: ISU Junior Grand Prix

International
Event	2003–04	2004–05	2005–06	2006–07	2007–08	2008–09
Worlds			18th QR.			
Europeans		27th	23rd		30th	
Ondrej Nepela		6th	14th		12th	19th
Golden Spin				13th		
Karl Schäfer		13th	17th			
Nebelhorn			17th			
Universiade				20th		
International: Junior
Junior Worlds	34th					
JGP Czech Rep.	14th					
JGP Germany		15th				
JGP Slovakia	16th					
National
Slovak Champ.	2nd	1st	1st	2nd	1st	
Levels: N. = Novice; Y. = Youth; J. = Junior; QR = Qualifying round
