= Peter Reitmayer =

Slovak figure skater (born 1993)

Personal information
- Born: 6 July 1993 (age 33) Košice, Slovakia
- Home town: Bratislava, Slovakia
- Height: 1.75 m (5 ft 9 in)

Figure skating career
- Country: Slovakia
- Discipline: Men's singles
- Skating club: ŠKP Bratislava
- Began skating: 1999

Medal record
Slovak Championships
Gold medal – first place	2009 Třinec	Singles
Gold medal – first place	2010 Cieszyn	Singles

Peter Reitmayer (born 6 July 1993) is a Slovak former competitive figure skater. A two-time senior national champion, he represented Slovakia at the 2009 World Junior Championships, 2010 European Championships, and 2010 World Championships. He also competed at the 2009 Nebelhorn Trophy, the final qualifying opportunity for the 2010 Winter Olympics. His placement, 21st, was not high enough to earn a spot at the Olympics.

Reitmayer is the son of Iveta Reitmayerová, a figure skating coach, and Peter Reitmayer, an alpine skier; the grandson of an ice hockey player, Jindrich; and the brother of Ivana Reitmayerová, a former figure skater.

Peter is currently a figure skater performing in shows on cruise ships.

== Programs ==
Season	Short program	Free skating
2011–12	Sing, Sing, Sing by Benny Goodman	Romeo and Juliet Overture by Pyotr I. Tchaikovsky
2010–11	Phantasia by Sarah Chang; Nessun dorma performed by Vanessa-Mae	Naruto: Shippuden by Yasuharu Takanashi
2009–10	El Tango de Roxanne (from Moulin Rouge!)	Globus Flamenco
2008–09	Cirque du Soleil	Mystery

== Competitive highlights ==
- JGP – Event of the ISU Junior Grand Prix Series

Competition placements at senior level
Season	2008–09	2009–10
World Championships		31st
European Championships		24th
Slovak Championships	1st	1st
Three Nationals Championships	5th	5th
Merano Cup	5th	
Nebelhorn Trophy		21st
Ondrej Nepela Memorial	9th	14th

Competition placements at junior level
Season	2008–09	2009–10	2010–11	2011–12
World Junior Championships	17th			
JGP Great Britain	6th			
JGP Italy	8th			
JGP Poland		18th		13th
JGP Turkey		8th		
European Youth Olympic Festival	5th			
Reykjavik International Games			1st	
