= Elżbieta Gabryszak =

Polish figure skater

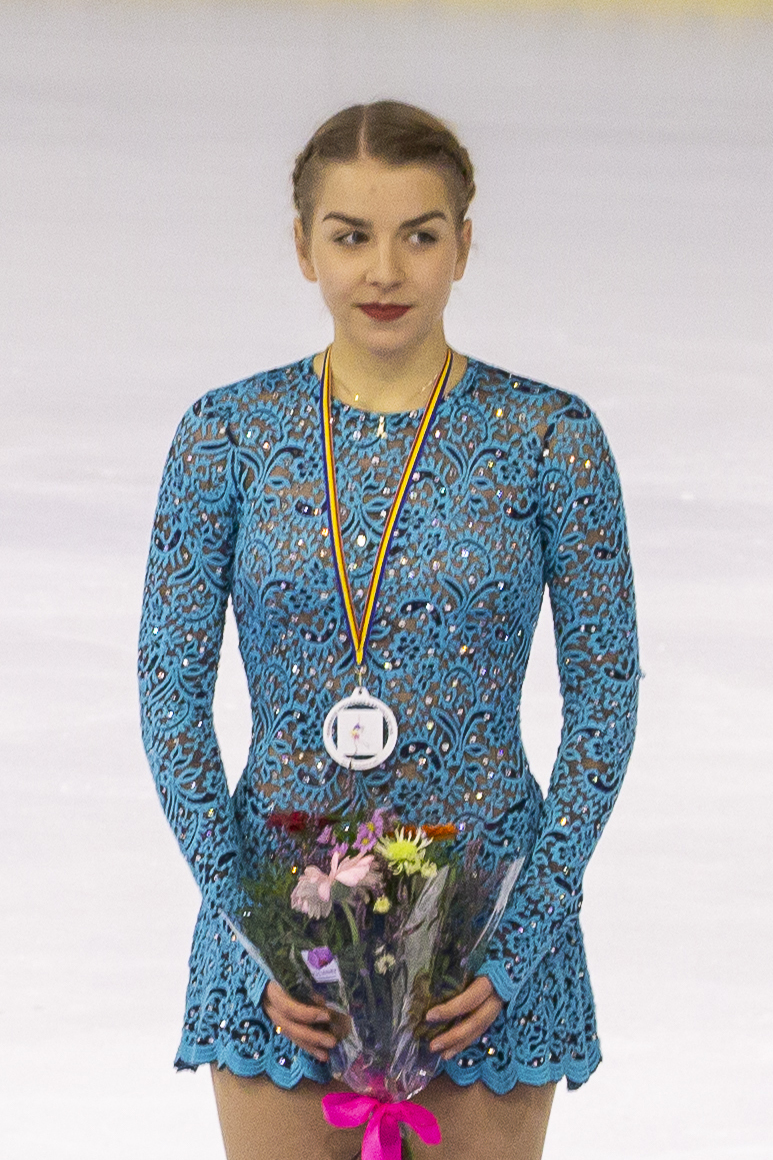
- Elżbieta Gabryszak at Open d'Andorra 2019

Personal information
- Born: 6 August 1998 (age 28) Tychy, Poland
- Height: 1.61 m (5 ft 3 1/2 in)

Figure skating career
- Country: Poland
- Coach: Iwona Mydlarz-Chruścińska
- Skating club: Soła Oświęcim
- Began skating: 2003
Medal record
Representing Poland
Polish Championships
Gold medal – first place	2017 Katowice	Singles
Gold medal – first place	2018 Košice	Singles
Silver medal – second place	2019 Budapest	Singles
Silver medal – second place	2021 Cieszyn	Singles
Silver medal – second place	2022 Spišská Nová Ves	Singles
Bronze medal – third place	2020 Ostrava	Singles

Elżbieta Gabryszak (Polish pronunciation: [ɛlʐˈbjɛta ɡaˈbrɨʂak]; born 6 August 1998) is a Polish figure skater. She is the 2017 Crystal Skate of Romania champion, the 2019 Open d'Andorra silver medalist, the 2018 Warsaw Cup bronze medalist, and a two-time Polish national champion (2017, 2018).

== Personal life ==
Gabryszak was born on August 6, 1998 in Tychy.

She married Polish pair skater, Michał Woźniak, in May 2024.

== Career ==
=== Early years ===
Gabryszak began learning to skate in 2003. Coached by Iwona Mydlarz-Chruścińska, she made her junior international debut in November 2012. In September 2015, she competed at an ISU Junior Grand Prix event.

=== 2016–2017 season ===
Gabryszak's senior international debut came in November 2016 at the Warsaw Cup. She won her first senior national title in December at the Four National Championships in Katowice.

=== 2017–2018 season ===
In October 2017, Gabryszak took gold at the Crystal Skate of Romania. At Four Nationals, held in December in Košice, she won her second national title. She placed 34th at the 2018 European Championships in Moscow, Russia.

=== 2018–2019 season ===
Gabryszak was awarded the bronze medal at the Warsaw Cup in November 2018. At Four Nationals in Budapest, she finished second among the Polish competitors, behind Ekaterina Kurakova, who was not yet eligible to compete internationally. In January, Gabryszak placed 25th at the 2019 European Championships in Minsk, Belarus.

== Programs ==
Season	Short program	Free skating
2017–2019	Big Spender performed by Shirley Bassey	Who Wants to Live Forever performed by The Tenors, Lindsey Stirling
2015–2016	Tu vuò fà l'americano performed by Sophia Loren	Tango Amore by Edvin Marton choreo. by Jenia Gres
2013–2014	Hasta Que Te Conocí by Raúl Di Blasio	Tosca Fantasy by Edvin Marton

== Competitive highlights ==
International
Event	11–12	12–13	13–14	14–15	15–16	16–17	17–18	18–19	19–20	20–21	21–22
Europeans							34th	25th			
CS Denis Ten											WD
CS Ice Star									18th		
CS Nebelhorn							24th				
CS Ondrej Nepela								10th			
CS Tallinn Trophy						21st	24th				
CS Warsaw Cup						25th	9th		WD	C	22nd
Budapest Trophy											16th
Coupe du Printemps											6th
Crystal Skate							1st				
Cup of Tyrol						8th					
Four Nationals								7th	12th	4th	
Golden Bear									16th		
Ice Star								9th			
Open d'Andorra									2nd		4th
Open Ice Mall								7th			
Slovenia Open							14th				
Volvo Open Cup								10th			
Warsaw Cup								3rd			
Universiade								12th			
International: Junior
JGP Poland					28th						
Mini Europa		4th	2nd								
Warsaw Cup		18th	22nd								
National
Polish Champ.			8th		5th	1st	1st	2nd	3rd	2nd	2nd
Polish Junior Champ.	4th	4th	10th	2nd	1st						
Four Nationals			20th		17th	8th	4th	4th	12th	4th	13th
