= Monika Simančíková =

Slovak former competitive figure skater (born 1995)

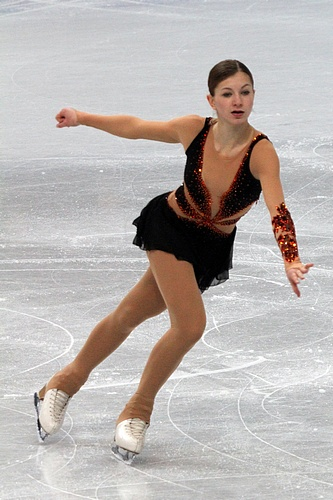
- Simančíková in 2012

Personal information
- Born: 14 August 1995 (age 31) Piešťany, Slovakia
- Home town: Piešťany
- Height: 1.65 m (5 ft 5 in)

Figure skating career
- Country: Slovakia
- Discipline: Women's singles
- Coach: Vladimir Dvojnikov, Karel Fajfr
- Skating club: TJ AKO Piešťany
- Began skating: 1999
- Retired: 2014

Medal record
Slovak Championships
Gold medal – first place	2012 Ostrava	Singles
Silver medal – second place	2014 Bratislava	Singles

Monika Simančíková (born 14 August 1995) is a Slovak former competitive figure skater. She is the 2012 Ondrej Nepela Memorial silver medalist and 2012 Slovak national champion. She qualified to the free skate at five ISU Championships, including the 2013 World Championships in London, Ontario, Canada.

She trained mainly in Nové Mesto nad Váhom and occasionally in Piešťany and Oberstdorf. Her mother is a figure skating coach of younger children.

== Programs ==
Season	Short program	Free skating
2012–2013	Tango de Amor (from The Addams Family) by Andrew Lippa	Bacchanale (from Samson and Delilah) by Camille Saint-Saëns
2011–2012	Tango de Amor (from The Addams Family) by Andrew Lippa	Granada by Agustín Lara
2010–2011	Don Quixote by Ludwig Minkus	Miss Saigon by Claude-Michel Schönberg

== Competitive highlights ==
JGP: Junior Grand Prix

International
Event	07–08	08–09	09–10	10–11	11–12	12–13	13–14
World Champ.						17th	
European Champ.					14th	15th	
Ice Challenge						3rd	
Merano Cup					8th		8th
Nepela Trophy					4th	2nd	11th
New Year's Cup						3rd	
NRW Trophy					14th	11th	
International: Junior or novice
World Junior Champ.				18th	15th		
JGP Austria				5th		11th	
JGP Czech Republic				6th			
JGP Estonia					9th		
JGP Germany			10th			7th	
JGP Poland			7th		10th		
EYOF				3rd J			
Ice Challenge				1st J			
Tirnavia Ice Cup			2nd J				
National
Slovak Champ.	1st J	1st J	1st J	1st J	1st		2nd
