= Silvia Hugec =

Slovak-American retired figure skater (born 2000)

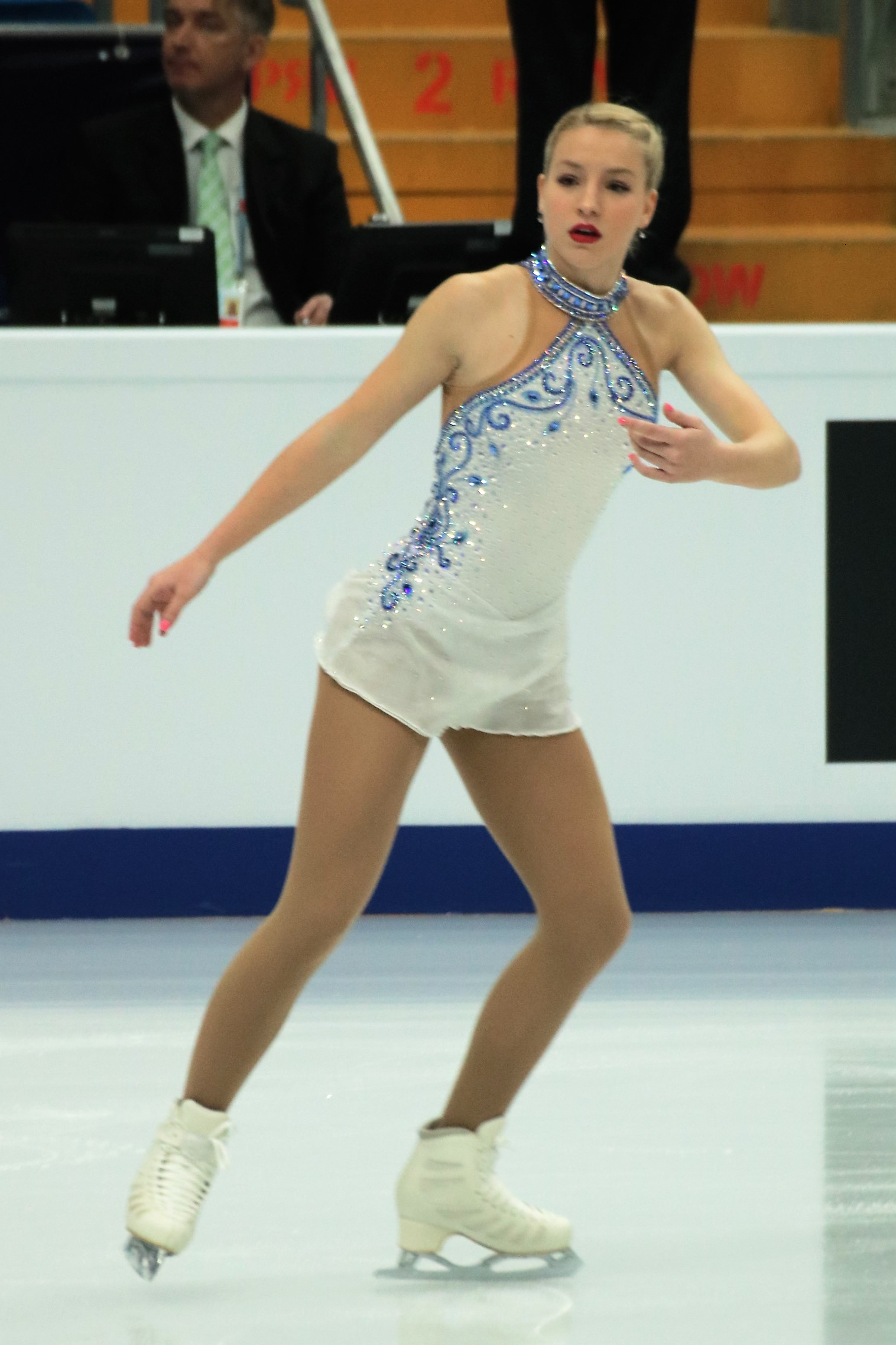
- Silvia Hugec at the 2018 European Championships

Personal information
- Born: December 22, 2000 (age 25) Paterson, New Jersey
- Home town: Saint Paul, Minnesota
- Height: 1.72 m (5 ft 7 1/2 in)

Figure skating career
- Country: Slovakia
- Discipline: Women's singles
- Coach: Ann Edison, Benjamin Miller Reisman
- Skating club: Krasocentrum Kosice
- Began skating: 2005
- Retired: July 18, 2019

Medal record
Slovak Championships
Gold medal – first place	2018 Košice	Singles
Silver medal – second place	2019 Budapest	Singles

Silvia Valeria Hugec (born December 22, 2000) is a Slovak-American retired figure skater. She is the 2018 Slovak national champion and represented Slovakia at the 2018 European Championships, where she qualified to the final segment.

== Personal life ==
Silvia Valeria Hugec was born on December 22, 2000, in Paterson, New Jersey. Her parents moved to the United States from Slovakia in 1998. She resides in the suburbs of Minneapolis and studied at Mounds Park Academy in Saint Paul, Minnesota. After taking a gap year, she now attends Columbia University School of General Studies and is a new member of the Epsilon Upsilon chapter of Kappa Alpha Theta sorority.

== Career ==
=== Early years ===
Hugec started to skate as a five-year-old under the supervision of Ukrainian coach Igor Korobko and then transitioned to Canadian coach Lorie Charbonneau. She has multiple medals from Minnesota State Figure Skating Championships.

=== 2016–2017 ===
Hugec started competing internationally for Slovakia in October 2016, at the ISU Junior Grand Prix in Germany. In November 2016, she began training with Ann Eidson and Benjamin Miller Reisman at the Saint Paul Figure Skating Club.

In February 2017, she won the silver medal at the Slovak Junior Championships and placed 8th at the 2017 European Youth Olympic Winter Festival.

=== 2017–2018 ===
Hugec placed 12th at the ISU Junior Grand Prix in Austria. She finished 9th at a senior event, the 2017 CS Ondrej Nepela Trophy, which was part of the 2017–18 ISU Challenger Series. In December 2017, a few days before her 17th birthday, she became the Slovak national champion in the absence of Nicole Rajicova.

Hugec qualified to the final segment at the 2018 European Championships in Moscow.

== Programs ==
Season	Short program	Free skating
2018–2019	The Milagro Beanfield War: Suite by Dave Grusin choreo. by Molly Oberstar	Romeo & Juliet by Abel Korzeniowski choreo. by Molly Oberstar
2017–2018	Scars to Your Beautiful by Alessia Cara	The Sleeping Beauty by Pyotr Tchaikovsky
2016–2017	Too Darn Hot (RNC mix) performed by Ella Fitzgerald	Scheherazade by Nikolai Rimsky-Korsakov

== Results ==
GP: Grand Prix; CS: Challenger Series; JGP: Junior Grand Prix

International
Event	16–17	17–18	18–19
Europeans		24th	30th
CS Ondrej Nepela		9th	8th
CS Tallinn Trophy			15th
Four Nationals			7th
International: Junior
Junior Worlds		33rd	34th
JGP Austria		12th	
JGP Croatia		13th	
JGP Czech Republic			14th
JGP Germany	26th		
JGP Slovakia			21st
EYOF	8th		
National
Slovak Champ.	2nd J	1st	2nd
Four Nationals		6th	7th
J = Junior
