= Elizaveta Ukolova =

Сzech figure skater

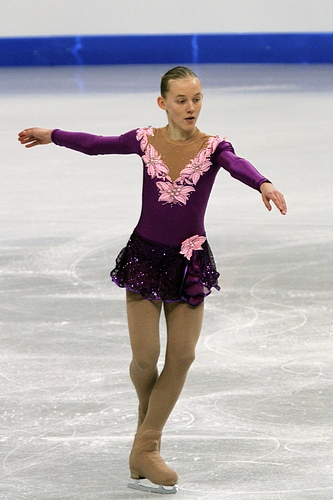
- Ukolova in 2012

Personal information
- Other names: Alžběta Ukolová
- Born: 12 March 1998 (age 28) Kirov, Russia
- Home town: Poděbrady, Czech Republic
- Height: 1.75 m (5 ft 9 in)

Figure skating career
- Country: Czech Republic
- Coach: Marie Sedláčková, František Pechar
- Skating club: USK Prague
- Began skating: 2005

Medal record
Czech Championships
Silver medal – second place	2014 Bratislava	Singles
Silver medal – second place	2015 Budapest	Singles

Elizaveta Ukolova (Russian: Елизавета Уколова; born 12 March 1998) is a Czech figure skater. She has won three senior international medals and is a two-time Czech national silver medalist. She competed at the 2014 Winter Olympics and qualified for the free skate.

== Personal life ==
Born on 12 March 1998 in Kirov, Kirov Oblast, Russia, Elizaveta Ukolova moved with her family to the Czech Republic when she was two years old. She became a Czech citizen in 2012. She has two elder sisters — Mariya, a competitor in ice dancing, and Anna, an operation manager in Landmarktours.

== Career ==
=== Early years ===
Ukolova started skating in 2005, having been introduced to the activity by her mother.

She debuted on the ISU Junior Grand Prix (JGP) series in the 2011–2012 season. After winning the Czech national junior title in December 2011, she was named in the Czech team to the 2012 World Junior Championships in Minsk, Belarus. Ranked 24th in the short, she qualified for the free skate, where she placed 20th, lifting her to 22nd overall.

The following season, Ukolova competed in two JGP events and won the junior title at the 2012 NRW Trophy. She was eliminated from the 2013 World Junior Championships in Milan, Italy after placing 33rd in the short program.

=== 2013–2014: Olympic season ===
Ukolova continued on the JGP series in the 2013–2014 season. She was also assigned to the 2013 Nebelhorn Trophy following a Czech internal competition in August. Nebelhorn was her senior international debut and the final qualifying competition for the 2014 Winter Olympics. As a result of Ukolova's tenth-place finish, the Czech Republic received one of the six remaining spots for countries which had not previously qualified a ladies' entry.

Ukolova won her first senior international medal, bronze, at the 2013 Warsaw Cup. During the season, she trained mainly in Prague and also spent a week per month in Oberstdorf. At the Olympics in Sochi, she qualified for the free skate and finished 22nd overall.

=== 2014–2015 to present ===
Competing in Tallinn, Estonia at the 2015 World Junior Championships, Ukolova placed 20th in the short, 17th in the free, and 17th overall.

Stepping onto her second senior international podium, she received the bronze medal at the 2015 Merano Cup.

== Programs ==
Season	Short program	Free skating
2018–2019	All I Ask of You (from The Phantom of the Opera) by Andrew Lloyd Webber	Don't Cry for Me Argentina (from Evita) by Andrew Lloyd Webber, Tim Rice performed by Madonna
2017–2018	Symphony No. 40 by Wolfgang Amadeus Mozart	Don't Cry for Me Argentina (from Evita) by Andrew Lloyd Webber, Tim Rice performed by Madonna
2016–2017	Symphony No. 40 by Wolfgang Amadeus Mozart	The Master and Margarita by Igor Kornelyuk
2015–2016	Symphony No. 40 by Wolfgang Amadeus Mozart	Life Is Beautiful by Nicola Piovani
2014–2015	A Thousand Years by Christina Perri	Life Is Beautiful by Nicola Piovani
2012–2014	A Comme Amour by Paul de Senneville performed by Richard Clayderman	Swing Kids by James Horner; Autumn Leaves by Joseph Kosma
2011–2012	Culture by Chris Spheeris	Within by William Joseph

== Competitive highlights ==
CS: Challenger Series; JGP: Junior Grand Prix

International
Event	11–12	12–13	13–14	14–15	15–16	16–17	17–18	18–19	19–20
Olympics			22nd						
CS Golden Spin				18th					
CS Ice Challenge					13th				
CS Lombardia							31st		
CS Nebelhorn					13th	10th	17th		
CS Ondrej Nepela				11th				11th	WD
CS Tallinn Trophy					10th	15th		17th	
CS Warsaw Cup				15th			15th		
Bavarian Open			4th	8th					
Cup of Tyrol						6th	11th		
Four Nationals								13th	
Halloween Cup								11th	
Hellmut Seibt					5th				
Merano Cup					3rd				
Nebelhorn Trophy			10th						
NRW Trophy			5th	10th	2nd	11th			
Toruń Cup				8th					
Warsaw Cup			3rd						
International: Junior
Junior Worlds	22nd	33rd		17th					
JGP Czech Rep.			12th	12th		14th			
JGP Germany		11th							
JGP Latvia					10th				
JGP Poland	15th								
JGP Slovakia			9th						
JGP Turkey		8th							
Ice Challenge	8th								
Merano Cup	4th	5th							
NRW Trophy	2nd	1st							
National
Czech Champ.			2nd	2nd	4th	WD	6th	5th	
Czech Junior Champ.	1st	1st		2nd	1st				
Four Nationals			2nd	4th	7th	WD	11th	11th	
J = Junior level; TBD = Assigned; WD = Withdrew
