= Beatrice Tomczak =

Polish-German figure skater

Personal information
- Full name: Beatrice Kathrin Tomczak
- Born: 28 June 1995 (age 31) Essen (Germany)
- Home town: Łódź (Poland)
- Height: 1.63 m (5 ft 4 in)

Figure skating career
- Country: (Poland) / (Hungary)
- Partner: Daniel Illes
- Began skating: 2007

Beatrice Kathrin Tomczak (born 28 June 1995) is a Polish-German ice dancer who has represented Hungary in the 2018/2019 season.

== Competitive highlights ==
=== Hungary ===
International
Event	18–19
Warsaw Cup	9th
Christmas Cup	3rd
National
Hungarian Champ.	3rd
TBD = Assigned

=== Poland ===
International
Event	13–14	14–15
Junior Worlds	23rd J.	
JGP Poland	18th J.	
Pavel Roman Memorial	5th J.	4th
Warsaw Cup	10th	
Ice Star	9th	
National
Polish Champ.	1st J.	2nd
J = Junior level; TBD = Assigned
