= Alexandra Kunová =

Slovak figure skater (born 1992)

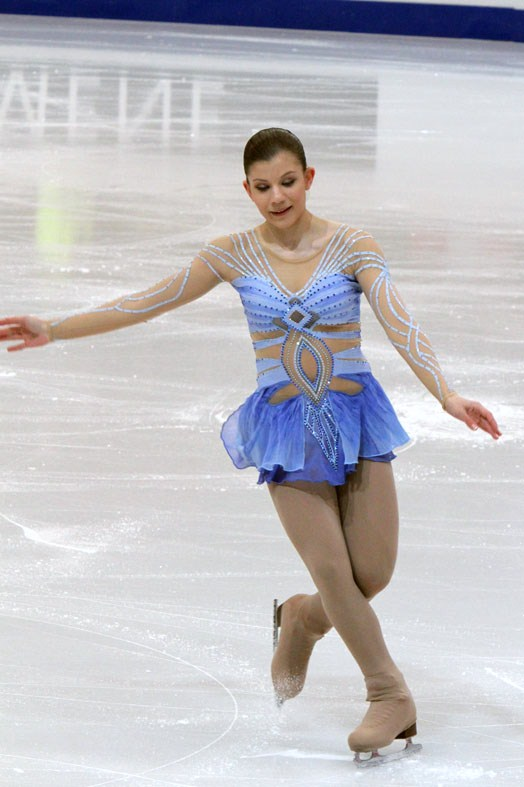
- Kunová in 2011

Personal information
- Born: 1 November 1992 (age 33) Bratislava, Czechoslovakia
- Height: 1.61 m (5 ft 3 1/2 in)

Figure skating career
- Country: Slovakia
- Discipline: Women's singles
- Coach: Petr Starec
- Skating club: SKP Bratislava
- Began skating: 2000

Medal record
Slovak Championships
Gold medal – first place	2011 Žilina	Singles
Silver medal – second place	2009 Třinec	Singles
Silver medal – second place	2010 Cieszyn	Singles
Silver medal – second place	2013 Cieszyn	Singles
Bronze medal – third place	2012 Ostrava	Singles
Bronze medal – third place	2014 Bratislava	Singles
Bronze medal – third place	2015 Budapest	Singles

Alexandra Kunová (born 1 November 1992) is a Slovak former competitive figure skater. She is the 2011 Slovak national champion.

== Programs ==
Season	Short program	Free skating
2011–2012	Tango de los Exilados by Vanessa-Mae, Walter Taieb	The Fifth by David Garrett; Mizu Hyakkei Ikuko Kawai
2010–2011	Tango de los Exilados by Vanessa-Mae, Walter Taieb	Fantasia on Themes from Vivaldi's Four Seasons by Michael Reed

== Results ==
CS: Challenger Series (began in the 2014–15 season); JGP: Junior Grand Prix

International
Event	2007–08	2008–09	2009–10	2010–11	2011–12	2012–13	2013–14	2014–15
Worlds					44th			
Europeans				24th				
CS Nepela Trophy		12th	WD			5th	20th	14th
CS Volvo Open							11th	18th
Challenge Cup						19th		
Crystal Skate		5th			11th	5th		
Cup of Nice		9th J.				22nd		
Golden Bear							6th	
Golden Spin				9th	14th		14th	
Ice Challenge			16th J.	14th				
Merano Cup		2nd J.		14th	16th			
Nebelhorn				13th				
NRW Trophy			21st					
Triglav Trophy	2nd J.	6th		WD		10th		
Warsaw Cup						12th		
Universiade							14th	19th
International: Junior
Junior Worlds			31st					
JGP Austria					25th			
JGP France		26th						
JGP Germany	25th		24th					
JGP Italy					24th			
EYOF		5th J.						
Gardena			5th J.	WD				
Tirnavia		1st J.	WD	5th J.				
National
Slovak Champ.		2nd	2nd	1st	3rd	2nd	3rd	3rd
Slovak Jr. Champ.				2nd				
Four Nationals		2nd	2nd	1st	3rd	2nd	3rd	3rd
