= Marco Klepoch =

Slovak figure skater

Personal information
- Born: 3 November 1997 (age 28) Bratislava, Slovakia
- Height: 1.72 m (5 ft 7 1/2 in)

Figure skating career
- Country: Slovakia
- Discipline: Men's singles
- Skating club: SKP Bratislava
- Began skating: 2003

Medal record
Slovak Championships
Gold medal – first place	2013 Cieszyn	Singles
Gold medal – first place	2014 Bratislava	Singles
Gold medal – first place	2015 Budapest	Singles
Gold medal – first place	2019 Budapest	Singles
Gold medal – first place	2021 Cieszyn	Singles
Silver medal – second place	2020 Ostrava	Singles
Bronze medal – third place	2016 Třinec	Singles
Bronze medal – third place	2017 Katowice	Singles
Bronze medal – third place	2018 Košice	Singles

Marco Klepoch (born 3 November 1997) is a Slovak figure skater. He is the 2018 Crystal Skate of Romania champion, the 2014 New Year's Cup silver medalist, and a five-time Slovak national champion (2013–15, 2019, 2021).

== Career ==
On the ice from the age of five, Klepoch began skating because his father wanted him to learn a variety of sports. His first instructor was Eva Takáčová and then Vladimir Dvojnikov. He is a member of ŠKP Bratislava's skating club and trains at the Vladimír Dzurilla ice rink in Bratislava.

== Programs ==
Season	Short program	Free skating
2016–2018	Writing's on the Wall (from Spectre) by Sam Smith	Rock You Like a Hurricane by the Scorpions
2014–2016	Money by Pink Floyd	Navras (from The Matrix Revolutions) by Don Davis
2013–2014	Perfect Day for a Murder (from The Pink Panther) by Christophe Beck	Smells Like Teen Spirit by Nirvana performed by David Garrett
2012–2013	Perfect Day for a Murder (from The Pink Panther) by Christophe Beck	Kashmir by Led Zeppelin

== Competitive highlights ==
- JGP – Event of the ISU Junior Grand Prix Series
- CS – Event of the ISU Challenger Series

Competition placements at senior level
Season	2012–13	2013–14	2014–15	2015–16	2016–17	2017–18	2018–19	2019–20	2020–21
European Championships		26th	29th						
Slovak Championships	1st	1st	1st	3rd	3rd	3rd	1st	2nd	1st
Four Nationals Championships	7th	8th	8th	14th	17th	19th	14th	13th	7th
CS Alpen Trophy							25th		
CS Budapest Trophy									11th
CS Golden Spin of Zagreb				23rd					
CS Ice Challenge			14th						
CS Nebelhorn Trophy					12th				
CS Nepela Memorial	17th	19th	6th	14th	19th	21st	13th	16th	
CS Volvo Open Cup			17th						
CS Warsaw Cup				16th					
Crystal Skate of Romania							1st		
Dragon Trophy						5th			
Golden Bear of Zagreb						6th			
Merano Cup						8th			
New Year's Cup		2nd							
Santa Claus Cup					16th	12th		7th	
Tirnavia Ice Cup								3rd	
World University Games					36th		20th		

Competition placements at junior level
Season	2011–12	2012–13	2013–14	2014–15	2015–16	2016–17
World Junior Championships		36th	27th	30th		
Slovak Championships			1st	1st	1st	
JGP Austria	20th	16th				
JGP Germany						26th
JGP Poland			27th		20th	
JGP Slovakia			21st		14th	
JGP Slovenia		22nd				
European Youth Olympic Festival		16th				
Grand Prix of Bratislava				1st		
Grand Prix SNP	1st			2nd	1st	
Hellmut Seibt Memorial			7th	7th	4th	
Ice Challenge		6th	10th			
Mentor Toruń Cup		4th				
New Year's Cup	1st	7th	1st			
Santa Claus Cup	3rd		2nd			
Skate Celje					4th	
Tirnavia Ice Cup	6th	3rd	1st	4th		6th
World Development Trophy					8th	
