= Bronislava Dobiášová =

Slovak figure skater

Bronislava Dobiášová Miško
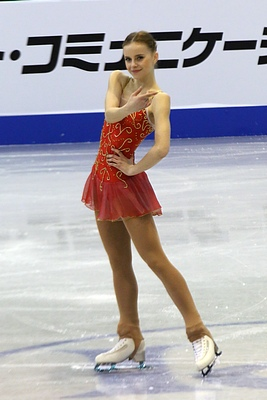

Personal information
- Born: 27 April 1998 (age 28) Trenčín, Slovakia
- Home town: Trenčín
- Height: 1.64 m (5 ft 4 1/2 in)

Figure skating career
- Country: Slovakia
- Discipline: Women's singles
- Coach: Vladimir Dvojnikov
- Skating club: KK Nové Mesto nad Váhom
- Began skating: 2003

Medal record
Slovak Championships
Gold medal – first place	2014 Bratislava	Singles
Silver medal – second place	2015 Budapest	Singles
Silver medal – second place	2017 Katowice	Singles

Bronislava Dobiášová Miško (born 27 April 1998) is a Slovak figure skater, the 2014 senior national champion. She represented Slovakia at the 2014 World Junior Championships in Sofia, Bulgaria. She qualified for the free skate and finished 23rd. She trains mainly in Nové Mesto nad Váhom.

== Programs ==
Season	Short program	Free skating
2016–17	Selection by Christina Aguilera	Die Fledermaus by Johann Strauss II
2015–16	I Love You, I Hate You by Raúl Di Blasio	Scheherazade by Nikolai Rimsky-Korsakov
2014–15	I Love You, I Hate You by Raúl Di Blasio	Don Quixote by Ludwig Minkus
2013–14	Tango Argentino	Don Quixote by Ludwig Minkus

== Competitive highlights ==
CS: Challenger Series; JGP: Junior Grand Prix

International
Event	12–13	13–14	14–15	15–16	16–17	18–19
CS Golden Spin			23rd			
CS Ondrej Nepela			10th	17th	15th	
CS Warsaw Cup					20th	
Crystal Skate						5th
New Year's Cup		5th				
Universiade						18th
Volvo Open						22nd
International: Junior
Junior Worlds		23rd				
JGP Austria				23rd		
JGP Czech Rep.			16th		19th	
JGP Estonia			17th			
JGP Poland				21st		
JGP Slovakia		17th				
EYOF	16th					
Ice Challenge	14th J	13th J	6th J			
New Year's Cup	4th J					
Seibt Memorial		4th J	9th J	8th J		
Tirnavia Ice Cup	6th J	5th J				
GP Bratislava			7th J			
Grand Prize SVK	1st J					
National
Slovak Champ.		1st	2nd		2nd	WD
Slovak Junior Champ.			1st	2nd		
Four Nationals		7th	5th		6th	WD
J = Junior level
