= 2009 NHK Trophy =

- Type: Grand Prix
- Date: November 5 – 8
- Season: 2009–10
- Location: Nagano
- Host: Japan Skating Federation
- Venue: Big Hat

Champions
- Men's singles: (France) Brian Joubert
- Ladies' singles: (Japan) Miki Ando
- Pairs: (China) Pang Qing / Tong Jian
- Ice dance: (United States) Meryl Davis / Charlie White
- Previous: 2008 NHK Trophy
- Next: 2010 NHK Trophy
- Previous Grand Prix: 2009 Cup of China
- Next Grand Prix: 2009 Skate America

The 2009 NHK Trophy was the fourth event of six in the 2009–10 ISU Grand Prix of Figure Skating, a senior-level international invitational competition series. It was held at the Big Hat in Nagano on November 5–8. Medals were awarded in the disciplines of men's singles, ladies' singles, pair skating, and ice dancing. Skaters earned points toward qualifying for the 2009–10 Grand Prix Final. The compulsory dance was the Tango Romantica.

== Schedule ==
All times are Japan Standard Time (UTC+9).

- Friday, November 6
  - 14:30 Ice dancing – Compulsory dance
  - 15:45 Pairs – Short program
  - 17:10 Men – Short program
  - 19:05 Ladies – Short program
- Saturday, November 7
  - 12:45 Ice dancing – Original dance
  - 14:15 Pairs – Free skating
  - 15:55 Men – Free skating
  - 18.50 Ladies – Free skating
- Sunday, November 8
  - 13:00 Ice dancing – Free dance
  - 16:00 Gala exhibition

== Results ==
=== Men ===
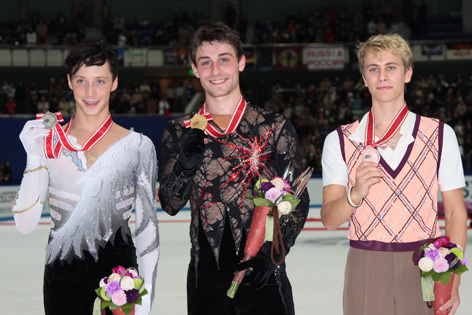
Johnny Weir (2nd), Brian Joubert (1st), Michal Březina (3rd).

Rank	Name	Nation	Total points	SP		FS	
1	Brian Joubert	France	232.70	1	85.35	1	147.35
2	Johnny Weir	United States	217.70	3	78.35	3	139.35
3	Michal Březina	Czech Republic	217.48	6	70.80	2	146.68
4	Daisuke Takahashi	Japan	214.29	4	78.18	4	136.11
5	Jeremy Abbott	United States	208.45	2	83.00	6	125.45
6	Adam Rippon	United States	197.61	8	67.15	5	130.46
7	Takahiko Kozuka	Japan	186.00	5	74.05	10	111.95
8	Artem Borodulin	Russia	181.62	7	69.49	9	112.13
9	Daisuke Murakami	Japan	181.04	9	66.78	8	114.26
10	Jeremy Ten	Canada	178.87	12	61.69	7	117.18
11	Vaughn Chipeur	Canada	176.36	10	66.55	12	109.81
12	Kristoffer Berntsson	Sweden	176.01	11	64.64	11	111.37

=== Ladies ===
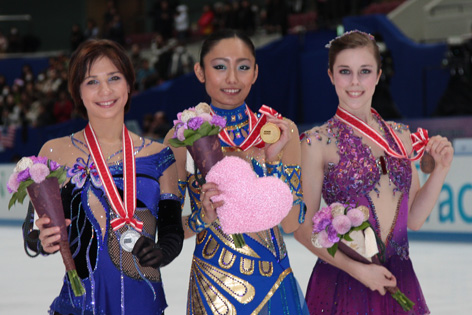
Alena Leonova (2nd), Miki Ando (1st), Ashley Wagner (3rd).

Rank	Name	Nation	Total points	SP		FS	
1	Miki Ando	Japan	162.55	2	56.22	2	106.33
2	Alena Leonova	Russia	160.85	5	52.34	1	108.51
3	Ashley Wagner	United States	155.99	1	56.54	3	99.45
4	Yukari Nakano	Japan	152.35	3	54.92	5	97.43
5	Laura Lepistö	Finland	152.19	4	53.64	4	98.55
6	Cynthia Phaneuf	Canada	142.03	7	47.22	6	94.81
7	Liu Yan	China	126.49	6	47.64	10	78.85
8	Annette Dytrt	Germany	126.01	9	44.86	9	81.15
9	Oksana Gozeva	Russia	123.97	11	40.66	7	83.31
10	Shoko Ishikawa	Japan	119.63	10	44.28	11	75.35
11	Becky Bereswill	United States	118.42	12	36.26	8	82.16
WD	Sarah Meier	Switzerland		8	45.96		

- WD = Withdrawn

=== Pairs ===
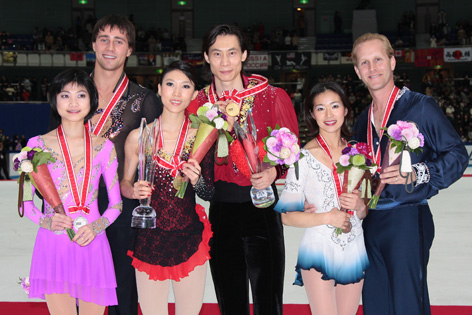
Yuko Kavaguti / Alexander Smirnov (2nd), Pang Qing / Tong Jian (1st), Rena Inoue / John Baldwin (3rd).

Rank	Name	Nation	Total points	SP		FS	
1	Pang Qing / Tong Jian	China	199.65	2	67.30	1	132.35
2	Yuko Kavaguti / Alexander Smirnov	Russia	193.05	1	68.90	2	124.15
3	Rena Inoue / John Baldwin	United States	158.78	4	52.52	3	106.26
4	Caydee Denney / Jeremy Barrett	United States	151.43	3	55.20	5	96.23
5	Mylène Brodeur / John Mattatall	Canada	150.71	6	51.10	4	99.61
6	Ksenia Krasilnikova / Konstantin Bezmaternikh	Russia	137.49	5	51.32	6	86.17
7	Paige Lawrence / Rudi Swiegers	Canada	130.77	7	47.32	7	83.45
8	Narumi Takahashi / Mervin Tran	Japan	119.48	8	39.80	8	79.68

=== Ice dancing ===
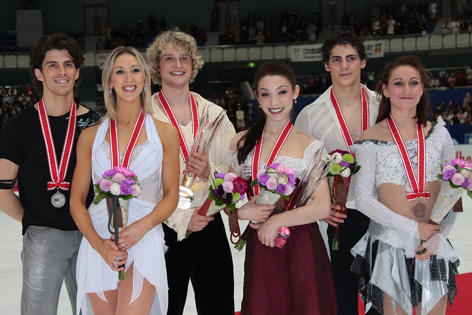
Sinead Kerr / John Kerr (2nd), Meryl Davis / Charlie White (1st), Vanessa Crone / Paul Poirier (3rd).

Rank	Name	Nation	Total points	CD		OD		FD	
1	Meryl Davis / Charlie White	United States	201.97	1	38.09	1	63.09	1	100.79
2	Sinead Kerr / John Kerr	United Kingdom	177.73	2	35.04	2	56.53	2	86.16
3	Vanessa Crone / Paul Poirier	Canada	165.89	4	30.51	3	50.87	3	84.51
4	Ekaterina Bobrova / Dmitri Soloviev	Russia	160.01	3	31.72	6	47.51	4	80.78
5	Huang Xintong / Zheng Xun	China	154.90	6	28.77	5	48.34	5	77.79
6	Anna Zadorozhniuk / Sergei Verbillo	Ukraine	154.61	5	29.67	4	49.01	6	75.93
7	Cathy Reed / Chris Reed	Japan	147.53	7	28.58	7	46.36	8	72.59
8	Allie Hann-McCurdy / Michael Coreno	Canada	145.32	9	26.20	8	44.75	7	74.37
9	Lucie Myslivečková / Matěj Novák	Czech Republic	142.33	8	27.93	9	43.28	9	71.12
10	Jane Summersett / Todd Gilles	United States	130.24	10	24.23	10	39.16	10	66.85
