= 2007 World Junior Figure Skating Championships =

- Type: ISU Championship
- Date: February 26 – March 4
- Season: 2006–07
- Location: Oberstdorf, Germany
- Venue: Eissport Zentrum

Champions
- Men's singles: (United States) Stephen Carriere
- Ladies' singles: (United States) Caroline Zhang
- Pairs: (United States) Keauna McLaughlin / Rockne Brubaker
- Ice dance: (Russia) Ekaterina Bobrova / Dmitri Soloviev
- Previous: 2006 World Junior Championships
- Next: 2008 World Junior Championships

The 2007 World Junior Figure Skating Championships were held in Oberstdorf, Germany from February 26 to March 4. The event is open to figure skaters from ISU member nations who have reached the age of 13 by 1 July the previous year, but have not yet turned 19. The upper age limit for men competing in pairs and dance is 21. Skaters compete in four disciplines: men's singles, ladies' singles, pair skating, and ice dancing.

The term "Junior" refers to the age level rather than the skill level. Therefore, some of the skaters competing have competed nationally and internationally at the senior level, but are still age-eligible for World Juniors.

The compulsory dance was the Silver Samba.

== Medals table ==
| Rank | Nation | Gold | Silver | Bronze | Total |
|---|---|---|---|---|---|
| 1 | United States (USA) | 3 | 1 | 1 | 5 |
| 2 | Russia (RUS) | 1 | 1 | 2 | 4 |
| 3 | Canada (CAN) | 0 | 1 | 1 | 2 |
| 4 | Estonia (EST) | 0 | 1 | 0 | 1 |
| Totals (4 entries) | | 4 | 4 | 4 | 12 |

== Results ==
=== Men ===
| Rank | Name | Nation | Total points | SP | | FS | |
|---|---|---|---|---|---|---|---|
| 1 | Stephen Carriere | United States | 188.87 | 6 | 57.71 | 1 | 131.16 |
| 2 | Patrick Chan | Canada | 184.55 | 1 | 64.10 | 4 | 120.45 |
| 3 | Sergei Voronov | Russia | 180.40 | 5 | 59.49 | 3 | 120.91 |
| 4 | Brandon Mroz | United States | 178.40 | 7 | 57.21 | 2 | 121.19 |
| 5 | Kevin Reynolds | Canada | 178.32 | 4 | 59.52 | 5 | 118.80 |
| 6 | Guan Jinlin | China | 177.97 | 2 | 61.67 | 6 | 116.30 |
| 7 | Artem Borodulin | Russia | 171.61 | 8 | 57.21 | 7 | 114.40 |
| 8 | Takahito Mura | Japan | 171.46 | 3 | 61.16 | 8 | 110.30 |
| 9 | Tatsuki Machida | Japan | 157.05 | 17 | 50.88 | 9 | 106.17 |
| 10 | Eliot Halverson | United States | 155.97 | 14 | 53.51 | 10 | 102.46 |
| 11 | Joey Russell | Canada | 154.16 | 12 | 53.89 | 12 | 100.27 |
| 12 | Kim Lucine | France | 152.56 | 15 | 52.57 | 13 | 99.99 |
| 13 | Philipp Tischendorf | Germany | 151.84 | 20 | 49.85 | 11 | 101.99 |
| 14 | Adrian Schultheiss | Sweden | 151.29 | 9 | 56.79 | 15 | 94.50 |
| 15 | Florent Amodio | France | 151.17 | 11 | 55.29 | 14 | 95.88 |
| 16 | Michal Březina | Czech Republic | 143.33 | 19 | 50.36 | 16 | 92.97 |
| 17 | Moris Pfeifhofer | Switzerland | 143.24 | 13 | 53.56 | 19 | 89.68 |
| 18 | Marco Fabbri | Italy | 140.32 | 21 | 49.28 | 17 | 91.04 |
| 19 | Daniil Gleichengauz | Russia | 139.65 | 10 | 55.78 | 20 | 83.87 |
| 20 | Maciej Cieplucha | Poland | 139.41 | 22 | 49.08 | 18 | 90.33 |
| 21 | Boris Martinec | Croatia | 134.73 | 16 | 52.19 | 21 | 82.54 |
| 22 | Hirofumi Torii | Japan | 124.46 | 23 | 47.79 | 22 | 76.67 |
| 23 | Michael Chrolenko | Norway | 124.17 | 18 | 50.80 | 23 | 73.37 |
| 24 | Manuel Koll | Austria | 113.07 | 24 | 46.13 | 24 | 66.94 |
Free Skating Not Reached
| 25 | Samuli Tyyskä | Finland | | 25 | 46.05 | | |
| 26 | Denis Ten | Kazakhstan | | 26 | 45.69 | | |
| 27 | Yaroslav Fursov | Ukraine | | 27 | 45.09 | | |
| 28 | Thomas Paulson | United Kingdom | | 28 | 43.21 | | |
| 29 | Javier Raya | Spain | | 29 | 42.29 | | |
| 30 | Tigran Vardanjan | Hungary | | 30 | 41.46 | | |
| 31 | Danil Privalov | Azerbaijan | | 31 | 41.24 | | |
| 32 | Nicholas Fernandez | Australia | | 32 | 39.32 | | |
| 33 | Kim Min-seok | South Korea | | 33 | 36.74 | | |
| 34 | Hovhannes Mkrtchyan | Armenia | | 34 | 36.66 | | |
| 35 | Taras Rajec | Slovakia | | 35 | 35.80 | | |
| 36 | Kutay Eryoldas | Turkey | | 36 | 35.75 | | |
| 37 | Dimitri Kahirau | Belarus | | 37 | 34.38 | | |
| 38 | Evgeni Krasnapolski | Israel | | 38 | 33.80 | | |
| 39 | Tatsuya Tanaka | Hong Kong | | 39 | 31.21 | | |
| 40 | Darryll Sulindro-Yang | Chinese Taipei | | 40 | 30.67 | | |
| 41 | Sergei Muhhin | Estonia | | 41 | 29.43 | | |
| 42 | Konrad Giering | South Africa | | 42 | 26.94 | | |
| 43 | Zolt Kosz | Romania | | 43 | 24.08 | | |
| 44 | Amar Mehta | India | | 44 | 23.04 | | |
| 45 | Saulius Ambrulevičius | Lithuania | | 45 | 21.17 | | |

=== Ladies ===
American ladies swept the podium.

| Rank | Name | Nation | Total points | SP | | FS | |
|---|---|---|---|---|---|---|---|
| 1 | Caroline Zhang | United States | 169.25 | 1 | 59.17 | 1 | 110.08 |
| 2 | Mirai Nagasu | United States | 163.84 | 2 | 57.22 | 2 | 106.62 |
| 3 | Ashley Wagner | United States | 157.15 | 3 | 51.67 | 3 | 105.48 |
| 4 | Jenni Vähämaa | Finland | 138.61 | 6 | 47.50 | 4 | 91.11 |
| 5 | Rumi Suizu | Japan | 134.95 | 5 | 49.31 | 6 | 85.64 |
| 6 | Jelena Glebova | Estonia | 131.91 | 4 | 51.22 | 11 | 80.69 |
| 7 | Laura Lepistö | Finland | 129.72 | 12 | 43.19 | 5 | 86.53 |
| 8 | Shin Yea-ji | South Korea | 126.45 | 10 | 44.56 | 9 | 81.89 |
| 9 | Nana Takeda | Japan | 126.43 | 15 | 41.76 | 7 | 84.67 |
| 10 | Stefania Berton | Italy | 126.06 | 8 | 45.30 | 10 | 80.76 |
| 11 | Satsuki Muramoto | Japan | 123.85 | 21 | 39.70 | 8 | 84.15 |
| 12 | Alena Leonova | Russia | 122.89 | 9 | 45.15 | 13 | 77.74 |
| 13 | Arina Martinova | Russia | 122.77 | 11 | 43.77 | 12 | 79.00 |
| 14 | Sonia Lafuente | Spain | 116.43 | 13 | 42.39 | 14 | 74.04 |
| 15 | Kim Chae-hwa | South Korea | 114.01 | 16 | 41.72 | 15 | 72.29 |
| 16 | Julie Cagnon | France | 112.15 | 20 | 40.22 | 16 | 71.93 |
| 17 | Victoria Muniz | Puerto Rico | 112.10 | 17 | 41.43 | 17 | 70.67 |
| 18 | Myriane Samson | Canada | 111.04 | 7 | 45.78 | 19 | 65.26 |
| 19 | Bettina Heim | Switzerland | 108.77 | 18 | 40.34 | 18 | 68.43 |
| 20 | Choi Ji-eun | South Korea | 105.90 | 14 | 41.93 | 20 | 63.97 |
| 21 | Julia Sheremet | Belarus | 98.00 | 22 | 39.33 | 22 | 58.67 |
| 22 | Jennie Lee | Chinese Taipei | 97.52 | 23 | 37.77 | 21 | 59.75 |
| 23 | Kerstin Frank | Austria | 96.26 | 19 | 40.30 | 24 | 55.96 |
| 24 | Brigitte Blickling | Germany | 93.17 | 28 | 36.34 | 23 | 56.83 |
| 25 | Katherine Hadford | Hungary | 93.05 | 24 | 37.72 | 25 | 55.33 |
Free Skating Not Reached
| 26 | Ivana Reitmayerová | Slovakia | | 25 | 37.41 | | |
| 27 | Vanessa James | United Kingdom | | 26 | 37.35 | | |
| 28 | Viktoria Helgesson | Sweden | | 27 | 36.42 | | |
| 29 | Nella Simaová | Czech Republic | | 29 | 35.97 | | |
| 30 | Charissa Tansomboon | Thailand | | 30 | 35.88 | | |
| 31 | Tina Wang | Australia | | 31 | 35.77 | | |
| 32 | Mérovée Ephrem | Monaco | | 32 | 35.43 | | |
| 33 | Morgan Figgins | New Zealand | | 33 | 34.69 | | |
| 34 | Laura Czarnotta | Poland | | 34 | 34.26 | | |
| 35 | Loretta Hamui | Mexico | | 35 | 34.05 | | |
| 36 | Guo Yalu | China | | 36 | 33.90 | | |
| 37 | Jenna Syken | Israel | | 37 | 32.61 | | |
| 38 | Melissandre Fuentes | Andorra | | 38 | 32.36 | | |
| 39 | Anastasia Listopad | Ukraine | | 39 | 31.96 | | |
| 40 | Barbara Klerk | Belgium | | 40 | 31.47 | | |
| 41 | Teodora Vigu | Romania | | 41 | 30.97 | | |
| 42 | Mirna Libric | Croatia | | 42 | 30.78 | | |
| 43 | Daša Grm | Slovenia | | 43 | 30.49 | | |
| 44 | Beatrice Rozinskaite | Lithuania | | 44 | 30.42 | | |
| 45 | Sara Twete | Denmark | | 45 | 30.38 | | |
| 46 | Stasia Rage | Latvia | | 46 | 29.68 | | |
| 47 | Kristina Shlobina | Azerbaijan | | 47 | 29.44 | | |
| 48 | Eva Lim | Netherlands | | 48 | 29.37 | | |
| 49 | Devora Radeva | Bulgaria | | 49 | 27.20 | | |
| 50 | Siobhan McColl | South Africa | | 50 | 23.31 | | |
| 51 | Ani Vardanyan | Armenia | | 51 | 22.75 | | |
| 52 | Sonja Mugoša | Serbia | | 52 | 22.43 | | |

=== Pairs ===
| Rank | Name | Nation | Total points | SP | | FS | |
|---|---|---|---|---|---|---|---|
| 1 | Keauna McLaughlin / Rockne Brubaker | United States | 158.72 | 1 | 57.00 | 1 | 101.72 |
| 2 | Vera Bazarova / Yuri Larionov | Russia | 147.31 | 2 | 55.06 | 3 | 92.25 |
| 3 | Ksenia Krasilnikova / Konstantin Bezmaternikh | Russia | 145.47 | 3 | 53.01 | 2 | 92.46 |
| 4 | Bridget Namiotka / John Coughlin | United States | 141.39 | 4 | 50.76 | 4 | 90.63 |
| 5 | Kendra Moyle / Andy Seitz | United States | 129.03 | 5 | 50.71 | 7 | 78.32 |
| 6 | Amanda Velenosi / Mark Fernandez | Canada | 128.65 | 6 | 49.56 | 6 | 79.09 |
| 7 | Maria Sergejeva / Ilja Glebov | Estonia | 121.32 | 7 | 48.62 | 10 | 72.70 |
| 8 | Carolyn MacCuish / Andrew Evans | Canada | 120.06 | 9 | 44.90 | 8 | 75.16 |
| 9 | Elizaveta Levshina / Konstantin Gavrin | Russia | 119.72 | 8 | 46.85 | 9 | 72.87 |
| 10 | Li Jiaqi / Xu Jiankun | China | 118.15 | 12 | 38.21 | 5 | 79.94 |
| 11 | Anaïs Morand / Antoine Dorsaz | Switzerland | 113.34 | 10 | 44.31 | 12 | 69.03 |
| 12 | Amanda Sunyoto-Yang / Darryll Sulindro-Yang | Chinese Taipei | 111.95 | 11 | 40.56 | 11 | 71.39 |
| 13 | Krystyna Klimczak / Janusz Karweta | Poland | 97.54 | 14 | 35.04 | 14 | 62.50 |
| 14 | Sally Hoolin / Jake Bennett | United Kingdom | 94.42 | 16 | 30.90 | 13 | 63.52 |
| 15 | Kristína Kabátová / Martin Hanulák | Slovakia | 92.54 | 13 | 36.97 | 15 | 55.57 |
| 16 | Agne Oradauskaite / Rudy Halmaert | Lithuania | 83.39 | 15 | 31.81 | 16 | 51.58 |

=== Ice dancing ===
Ekaterina Bobrova / Dmitri Soloviev won the ice dancing title. Grethe Grünberg / Kristian Rand's silver medal is the first medal for Estonia at an ISU Championship. Kaitlyn Weaver dislocated her left shoulder in the warm-up before the original dance but was able to compete and won the bronze medal with Andrew Poje. Emily Samuelson / Evan Bates were forced to withdraw after he accidentally stepped on his partner's hand, lacerating a tendon.

| Rank | Name | Nation | Total points | CD | | OD | | FD | |
|---|---|---|---|---|---|---|---|---|---|
| 1 | Ekaterina Bobrova / Dmitri Soloviev | Russia | 161.89 | 1 | 35.52 | 1 | 54.13 | 1 | 72.24 |
| 2 | Grethe Grünberg / Kristian Rand | Estonia | 154.89 | 2 | 32.42 | 3 | 50.45 | 3 | 72.02 |
| 3 | Kaitlyn Weaver / Andrew Poje | Canada | 151.51 | 6 | 30.43 | 4 | 49.03 | 2 | 72.05 |
| 4 | Kristina Gorshkova / Vitali Butikov | Russia | 146.84 | 3 | 31.35 | 8 | 46.12 | 5 | 69.37 |
| 5 | Maria Monko / Ilia Tkachenko | Russia | 145.37 | 5 | 31.12 | 10 | 45.16 | 6 | 69.09 |
| 6 | Madison Hubbell / Keiffer Hubbell | United States | 145.24 | 12 | 26.90 | 5 | 48.31 | 4 | 70.03 |
| 7 | Élodie Brouiller / Benoît Richaud | France | 143.12 | 8 | 29.57 | 6 | 47.88 | 7 | 65.67 |
| 8 | Camilla Pistorello / Matteo Zanni | Italy | 142.45 | 7 | 30.26 | 7 | 46.69 | 8 | 65.50 |
| 9 | Vanessa Crone / Paul Poirier | Canada | 136.09 | 9 | 28.70 | 11 | 44.48 | 10 | 62.91 |
| 10 | Carolina Hermann / Daniel Hermann | Germany | 135.58 | 10 | 27.67 | 9 | 45.70 | 11 | 62.21 |
| 11 | Lynn Kriengkrairut / Logan Giulietti-Schmitt | United States | 133.91 | 13 | 26.13 | 12 | 44.36 | 9 | 63.42 |
| 12 | Nadezhda Frolenkova / Mikhail Kasalo | Ukraine | 131.19 | 11 | 27.14 | 13 | 43.06 | 12 | 60.99 |
| 13 | Joanna Budner / Jan Mościcki | Poland | 126.01 | 17 | 24.81 | 14 | 42.12 | 13 | 59.08 |
| 14 | Camilla Spelta / Marco Garavaglia | Italy | 123.87 | 15 | 25.69 | 15 | 40.84 | 14 | 57.34 |
| 15 | Krisztina Barta / Ádám Tóth | Hungary | 119.67 | 18 | 24.38 | 16 | 39.96 | 16 | 55.33 |
| 16 | Ekaterina Zaikina / Otar Japaridze | Georgia | 118.43 | 20 | 23.87 | 19 | 39.16 | 15 | 55.40 |
| 17 | Leigh Rogers / Lloyd Jones | United Kingdom | 114.51 | 16 | 25.59 | 20 | 37.95 | 17 | 50.97 |
| 18 | Lucie Myslivečková / Matěj Novák | Czech Republic | 113.56 | 19 | 24.08 | 17 | 39.95 | 18 | 49.53 |
| 19 | Nikola Višňová / Lukáš Csolley | Slovakia | 107.01 | 23 | 20.65 | 21 | 37.23 | 19 | 49.13 |
| 20 | Danielle O'Brien / Gregory Merriman | Australia | 101.66 | 22 | 21.04 | 22 | 33.82 | 22 | 46.80 |
| 21 | Ramona Elsener / Florian Roost | Switzerland | 99.98 | 25 | 20.48 | 23 | 31.63 | 20 | 47.87 |
| 22 | Irina Stork / Taavi Rand | Estonia | 99.94 | 21 | 21.45 | 25 | 31.04 | 21 | 47.45 |
| WD | Emily Samuelson / Evan Bates | United States | 85.16 | 4 | 31.18 | 2 | 53.98 | | |
| WD | Joanna Lenko / Mitchell Islam | Canada | 65.83 | 14 | 26.01 | 18 | 39.82 | | |
Free Dance Not Reached
| 25 | Ina Demireva / Juri Kurakin | Bulgaria | 52.07 | 24 | 20.58 | 24 | 31.49 | | |
| 26 | Alexandra Maksimova / Egor Maistrov | Belarus | 47.47 | 26 | 20.33 | 27 | 27.14 | | |
| 27 | Tamsyn Scoble / Quiesto Spieringshoek | South Africa | 45.70 | 27 | 18.08 | 26 | 27.62 | | |

== Prize money ==
The total prize money for the 2007 World Junior Figure Skating Championships is US$200,000. Pairs and dance teams split the money. Everything is in US dollars. The breakdown is as follows:

| Placement | Singles | Pairs / Dance |
|---|---|---|
| 1st | $10,000 | $15,000 |
| 2nd | $7,000 | $10,500 |
| 3rd | $5,000 | $7,500 |
| 4th | $3,500 | $4,500 |
| 5th | $2,750 | $4,000 |
| 6th | $2,500 | $3,750 |
| 7th | $2,250 | $3,500 |
| 8th | $2,000 | $3,000 |
| 9th | $1,750 | $2,750 |
| 10th | $1,500 | $2,250 |
| 11th | $1,250 | $1,750 |
| 12th | $1,000 | $1,500 |
