= 2008 World Junior Figure Skating Championships =

- Type: ISU Championship
- Date: February 25 – March 2
- Season: 2007–08
- Location: Sofia, Bulgaria
- Venue: Winter Sports Palace

Champions
- Men's singles: (United States) Adam Rippon
- Ladies' singles: (United States) Rachael Flatt
- Pairs: (Russia) Ksenia Krasilnikova / Konstantin Bezmaternikh
- Ice dance: (United States) Emily Samuelson / Evan Bates
- Previous: 2007 World Junior Championships
- Next: 2009 World Junior Championships

The 2008 World Junior Figure Skating Championships were held from February 25 through March 2 in Sofia, Bulgaria. Commonly called "World Juniors" and "Junior Worlds", they are an annual figure skating competition in which elite figure skaters compete for the title of World Junior Champion. The event is open to figure skaters from ISU member nations who have reached the age of 13 by July 1 of the previous year, but have not yet turned 19. The upper age limit for men competing in pairs and dance is 21. Skaters compete in four disciplines: men's singles, ladies' singles, pair skating, and ice dancing.

The term "Junior" refers to the age level rather than necessarily the skill level. Therefore, some of the skaters competing have competed nationally and internationally at the senior level, but are still age-eligible for World Juniors. Regardless of whether they have competed as seniors, all competitors perform programs that conform to the ISU rules for junior level competition in terms of program lengths, jumping passes, etc.

== Medals Table ==
Rank	Nation	Gold	Silver	Bronze	Total
1	United States (USA)	3	1	1	5
2	Russia (RUS)	1	2	1	4
3	Canada (CAN)	0	1	0	1
4	China (CHN)	0	0	2	2
Totals (4 entries)		4	4	4	12

== Results ==
=== Men ===
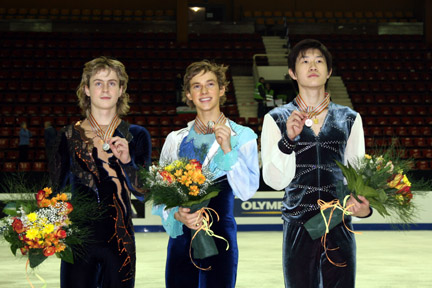
The men's podium. From left: Artem Borodulin (2nd), Adam Rippon (1st), Guan Jinlin (3rd).

Rank	Name	Nation	Total points	SP		FS	
1	Adam Rippon	United States	199.90	1	69.35	1	130.55
2	Artem Borodulin	Russia	194.77	2	66.16	2	128.61
3	Guan Jinlin	China	189.60	4	62.47	3	127.13
4	Brandon Mroz	United States	186.20	3	63.36	5	122.84
5	Michal Březina	Czech Republic	184.40	5	62.11	6	122.29
6	Kevin Reynolds	Canada	180.78	13	55.77	4	125.01
7	Ivan Bariev	Russia	175.06	10	58.39	7	116.67
8	Jeremy Ten	Canada	173.34	11	58.29	8	115.05
9	Tommy Steenberg	United States	166.64	6	61.33	13	105.31
10	Florent Amodio	France	164.79	9	58.50	12	106.29
11	Kim Lucine	France	164.61	7	60.01	16	104.60
12	Moris Pfeifhofer	Switzerland	162.88	15	51.23	10	111.65
13	Javier Fernández	Spain	161.01	14	52.25	11	108.76
14	Nikolai Bondar	Ukraine	159.61	12	56.68	17	102.93
15	Yang Chao	China	158.48	24	45.82	9	112.66
16	Denis Ten	Kazakhstan	155.70	8	60.00	19	95.70
17	Akio Sasaki	Japan	155.14	18	50.05	14	105.09
18	Adrian Schultheiss	Sweden	154.12	19	49.15	15	104.97
19	Takahito Mura	Japan	145.82	21	47.66	18	98.16
20	Nikita Mikhailov	Russia	140.36	23	46.40	20	93.96
21	Elladj Balde	Canada	140.34	22	46.98	21	93.36
22	Denis Wieczorek	Germany	137.17	17	50.37	22	86.80
23	Jakub Strobl	Slovakia	134.45	20	48.59	23	85.86
24	Maciej Cieplucha	Poland	133.69	16	50.70	24	82.99
25	Pavel Petrov Savinov	Bulgaria	77.51	46	24.70	25	52.81
Free Skating Not Reached
26	Viktor Romanenkov	Estonia		25	44.95		
27	Severin Kiefer	Austria		26	44.63		
28	Michael Chrolenko	Norway		27	44.62		
29	Bela Papp	Finland		28	44.45		
30	Evgeni Krasnapolski	Israel		29	43.44		
31	Ruben Errampalli	Italy		30	43.41		
32	Danil Privalov	Azerbaijan		31	41.39		
33	Matthew Precious	Australia		32	39.78		
34	Elliot Hilton	United Kingdom		33	39.53		
35	Boris Martinec	Croatia		34	37.76		
36	Kevin Alves	Brazil		35	34.44		
37	Dimitri Kahirau	Belarus		36	34.28		
38	Ruben Blommaert	Belgium		37	32.44		
39	Kim Min-seok	South Korea		38	32.31		
40	Sarkis Hairapetyan	Armenia		39	30.52		
41	Jesper Kristiansen	Denmark		40	30.44		
42	Cameron Hems	New Zealand		41	27.88		
43	Vlad Ionescu	Romania		42	27.35		
44	Krisztian Andraska	Hungary		43	27.03		
45	Boyito Mulder	Netherlands		44	26.42		
46	Engin Ali Artan	Turkey		45	25.96		
47	Saulius Ambrulevičius	Lithuania		47	22.45		

=== Ladies ===
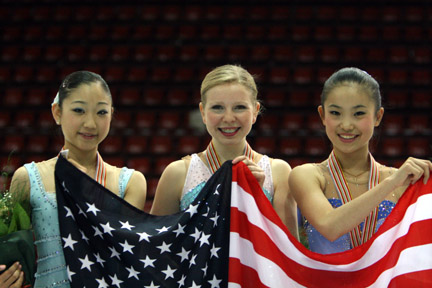
The ladies' medalists hold up the American flag. From left: Mirai Nagasu (3rd), Rachael Flatt (1st), Caroline Zhang (2nd).

Rank	Name	Nation	Total points	SP		FS	
1	Rachael Flatt	United States	172.19	3	60.16	1	112.03
2	Caroline Zhang	United States	171.84	2	62.60	2	109.24
3	Mirai Nagasu	United States	162.89	1	65.07	3	97.82
4	Jenni Vähämaa	Finland	142.54	6	50.30	4	92.24
5	Yuki Nishino	Japan	139.44	4	54.15	6	85.29
6	Alena Leonova	Russia	138.06	7	49.76	5	88.30
7	Joshi Helgesson	Sweden	130.46	8	49.10	9	81.36
8	Sarah Hecken	Germany	128.45	11	46.12	8	82.33
9	Katarina Gerboldt	Russia	126.37	18	43.09	7	83.28
10	Myriane Samson	Canada	125.91	14	44.73	10	81.18
11	Jelena Glebova	Estonia	125.56	5	53.05	12	72.51
12	Sonia Lafuente	Spain	119.99	9	46.36	11	73.63
13	Stefania Berton	Italy	115.21	15	44.62	13	70.59
14	Kim Hyeon-jung	South Korea	115.09	13	45.19	15	69.90
15	Ivana Reitmayerová	Slovakia	113.06	20	42.53	14	70.53
16	Rumi Suizu	Japan	112.19	10	46.25	21	65.94
17	Sin Na-hee	South Korea	111.47	12	45.30	20	66.17
18	Eleonora Vinnichenko	Ukraine	110.92	21	42.28	16	68.64
19	Miriam Ziegler	Austria	110.60	16	43.78	19	66.82
20	Sofia Otala	Finland	108.64	17	43.61	22	65.03
21	Geng Bingwa	China	107.97	24	39.82	17	68.15
22	Alexandra Rout	New Zealand	107.72	23	40.70	18	67.02
23	Cheltzie Lee	Australia	106.89	19	42.77	23	64.12
24	Katherine Hadford	Hungary	104.06	22	41.04	24	63.02
25	Manuela Stanukova	Bulgaria	84.52	43	29.60	25	54.92
Free Skating Not Reached
26	Svetlana Issakova	Estonia		25	39.73		
27	Nella Simaová	Czech Republic		26	39.68		
28	Emma Hagieva	Azerbaijan		27	38.80		
29	Sigrid Young	Chinese Taipei		28	38.70		
30	Minna Parviainen	Finland		29	36.76		
31	Sara Twete	Denmark		30	36.52		
32	Mirna Libric	Croatia		31	36.16		
33	Francesca Rio	Italy		32	34.45		
34	Barbara Klerk	Belgium		33	34.10		
35	Charlotte Gendreau	France		34	34.03		
36	Mérovée Ephrem	Monaco		35	33.89		
37	Noemie Silberer	Switzerland		36	33.81		
38	Mary Grace Baldo	Philippines		37	33.31		
39	Aneta Michałek	Poland		38	33.05		
40	Mary Ro Reyes	Mexico		39	32.84		
41	Nika Ceric	Slovenia		40	32.41		
42	Erle Harstad	Norway		41	31.76		
43	Beatrice Rozinskaite	Lithuania		42	30.07		
44	Elena Rodrigues	Brazil		44	29.14		
45	Manouk Gijsman	Netherlands		45	28.80		
46	Birce Atabey	Turkey		46	27.04		
47	Victoria Liakhava	Belarus		47	26.23		
48	Armine Stambultsyan	Armenia		48	26.04		
49	Zanna Pugaca	Latvia		49	25.83		
50	Georgia Glastris	Greece		50	25.34		
51	Anita Nagy	Romania		51	24.95		
52	Siobhan McColl	South Africa		52	23.80		
53	Lydia Fuentes	Andorra		53	22.64		
54	Sofia Bardakov	Israel		54	22.26		
55	Hounsh Munshi	India		55	21.13		
56	Mila Petrovic	Serbia		56	19.80		

=== Pairs ===
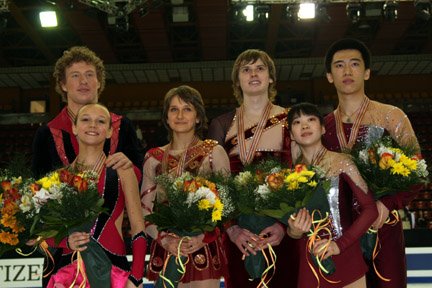
The pairs podium. From left: Lubov Iliushechkina / Nodari Maisuradze (2nd), Ksenia Krasilnikova / Konstantin Bezmaternikh (1st), Dong Huibo / Wu Yiming (3rd).

Rank	Name	Nation	Total points	SP		FS	
1	Ksenia Krasilnikova / Konstantin Bezmaternikh	Russia	148.12	1	56.30	2	91.82
2	Lubov Iliushechkina / Nodari Maisuradze	Russia	144.86	2	52.05	1	92.81
3	Dong Huibo / Wu Yiming	China	141.33	5	51.16	3	90.17
4	Ekaterina Sheremetieva / Mikhail Kuznetsov	Russia	136.14	3	51.94	5	84.20
5	Jessica Rose Paetsch / Jon Nuss	United States	133.12	8	48.01	4	85.11
6	Maria Sergejeva / Ilja Glebov	Estonia	131.02	9	46.92	6	84.10
7	Zhang Yue / Wang Lei	China	130.92	4	51.22	7	79.70
8	Monica Pisotta / Michael Stewart	Canada	127.23	7	48.29	8	78.94
9	Amanda Velenosi / Mark Fernandez	Canada	125.46	10	46.88	9	78.58
10	Chelsi Guillen / Danny Curzon	United States	123.93	6	49.37	12	74.56
11	Bianca Butler / Joseph Jacobsen	United States	120.81	12	45.92	11	74.89
12	Anaïs Morand / Antoine Dorsaz	Switzerland	118.92	11	46.27	14	72.65
13	Amanda Sunyoto-Yang / Darryll Sulindro-Yang	Chinese Taipei	118.90	14	41.95	10	76.95
14	Nicole Della Monica / Yannick Kocon	Italy	113.35	15	40.21	13	73.14
15	Narumi Takahashi / Mervin Tran	Japan	113.23	13	42.97	15	70.26
16	Krystyna Klimczak / Janusz Karweta	Poland	108.87	16	39.68	16	69.19
17	Gabriela Čermanová / Martin Hanulák	Slovakia	95.74	17	37.43	17	58.31
18	Camille Foucher / Bruno Massot	France	89.09	18	33.99	18	55.10
19	Andrea Hollerova / Jakub Safranek	Czech Republic	80.85	19	33.15	19	47.70
20	Natalie Ganem / Christopher Trefil	Hungary	70.91	20	25.77	20	45.14

=== Ice dancing ===
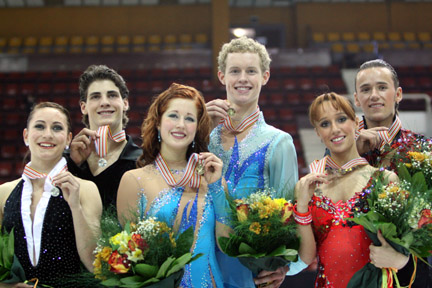
The ice dancing podium. From left: Vanessa Crone / Paul Poirier (2nd), Emily Samuelson / Evan Bates (1st), Kristina Gorshkova / Vitali Butikov (3rd).

Rank	Name	Nation	Total points	CD		OD		FD	
1	Emily Samuelson / Evan Bates	United States	181.66	1	35.11	1	57.84	1	88.71
2	Vanessa Crone / Paul Poirier	Canada	178.09	3	33.71	2	57.52	2	86.86
3	Kristina Gorshkova / Vitali Butikov	Russia	172.85	4	33.52	3	55.46	3	83.87
4	Maria Monko / Ilia Tkachenko	Russia	166.01	2	34.99	4	53.70	4	77.32
5	Madison Hubbell / Keiffer Hubbell	United States	157.47	5	30.52	5	51.30	5	75.65
6	Ekaterina Riazanova / Jonathan Guerreiro	Russia	153.29	7	28.69	6	50.96	6	73.64
7	Alisa Agafonova / Dmitri Dun	Ukraine	150.57	8	28.28	7	49.52	7	72.77
8	Kharis Ralph / Asher Hill	Canada	144.29	10	27.36	9	47.50	9	69.43
9	Isabella Pajardi / Stefano Caruso	Italy	144.13	14	24.96	8	47.59	8	71.58
10	Karen Routhier / Eric Saucke-Lacelle	Canada	138.61	9	27.46	11	46.01	11	65.14
11	Maureen Ibanez / Neil Brown	France	138.10	11	26.40	10	46.05	10	65.65
12	Lucie Myslivečková / Matěj Novák	Czech Republic	137.56	6	30.43	14	43.86	15	63.27
13	Ashley Foy / Benjamin Blum	Germany	134.84	12	25.91	12	44.34	13	64.59
14	Isabella Tobias / Otar Japaridze	Georgia	134.26	15	24.92	13	44.23	12	65.11
15	Natalia Mitiushina / Matteo Zanni	Italy	129.69	13	25.06	16	41.05	14	63.58
16	Anastasia Gavrylovych / Maciej Bernadowski	Poland	124.64	18	24.31	15	41.54	19	58.79
17	Nikola Višňová / Lukáš Csolley	Slovakia	123.33	22	22.81	22	40.17	16	60.35
18	Charlene Guignard / Guillaume Paulmier	France	122.78	16	24.83	17	40.90	21	57.05
19	Guan Xueting / Wang Meng	China	122.02	24	22.12	23	39.89	17	60.01
20	Emese Laszlo / Mate Fejes	Hungary	121.92	20	23.31	19	40.44	20	58.17
21	Barbora Heroldova / Nikolaj Sorensen	Denmark	121.58	23	22.56	21	40.19	18	58.83
22	Irina Shtork / Taavi Rand	Estonia	117.74	19	23.35	20	40.40	23	53.99
23	Oksana Klimova / Sasha Palomäki	Finland	117.05	21	23.14	24	38.48	22	55.43
24	Ina Demireva / Juri Kurakin	Bulgaria	107.35	27	20.76	27	37.00	24	49.59
WD	Penny Coomes / Nicholas Buckland	United Kingdom		17	24.77	26	37.22		
Free Dance Not Reached
26	Ekaterina Zabolotnaya / Julian Wagner	Germany	61.29	29	20.46	18	40.83		
27	Ramona Elsener / Florian Roost	Switzerland	59.15	25	21.91	25	37.24		
28	Sonja Pauli / Tobias Eisenbauer	Austria	54.59	26	21.89	29	32.70		
29	Kristina Kiudmaa / Aleksei Trohlev	Estonia	52.41	28	20.66	30	31.75		
30	Hanna Asadchaya / Dmitri Lamtyugin	Belarus	51.77	30	17.95	28	33.82		
Original Dance Not Reached
31	Jekaterina Sergejeva / Andrejs Sitiks	Latvia		31	17.44				
32	Tamsyn Scoble / Quiesto Spieringshoek	South Africa		32	13.87				
