= 2007–08 ISU Junior Grand Prix =

- Type: ISU Junior Grand Prix
- Date: August 30 – December 9, 2007
- Season: 2007–08
- Previous: 2006–07 ISU Junior Grand Prix
- Next: 2008–09 ISU Junior Grand Prix

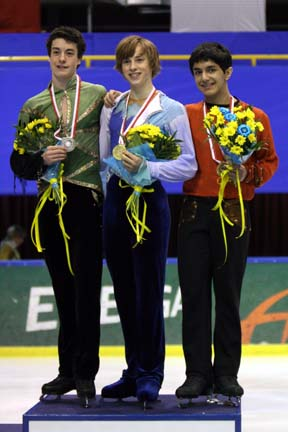
The men's podium at the Final

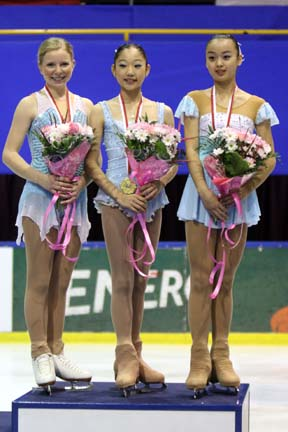
The ladies' podium at the Final

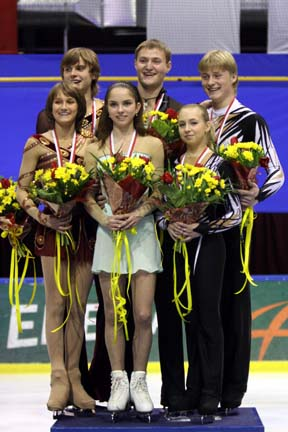
The pairs' podium at the Final

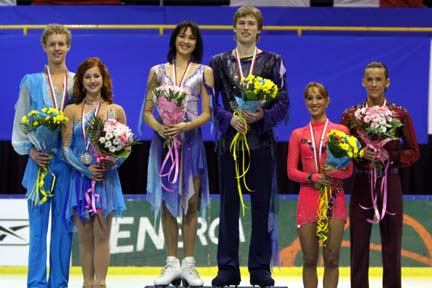
The ice dance podium at the Final

The 2007–08 ISU Junior Grand Prix was the 11th season of the ISU Junior Grand Prix, a series of international junior level competitions organized by the International Skating Union. It was the Junior-level complement to the 2007–08 ISU Grand Prix of Figure Skating, which is for Senior-level skaters. Skaters competed in the disciplines of men's singles, ladies' singles, pair skating, and ice dance. The top skaters from the series met at the Junior Grand Prix Final.

== Competitions ==
The locations of the JGP events change annually. This season, the series included the following events.

Date	Event	Location	Notes	Ref.
August 30 – September 2	2007 JGP United States	Lake Placid, New York, United States		
September 6–9	2007 JGP Romania	Miercurea Ciuc, Romania	No pairs	
September 13–16	2007 JGP Austria	Vienna, Austria	No pairs	
September 20–23	2007 JGP Estonia	Tallinn, Estonia		
September 27–30	2007 JGP Croatia	Zagreb, Croatia	No pairs	
October 4–7	2007 JGP Bulgaria	Sofia, Bulgaria	No pairs	
October 11–14	2007 JGP Germany	Chemnitz, Germany		
October 18–21	(United Kingdom) 2007 JGP Great Britain	Sheffield, England, Great Britain		
December 6–9	(Poland) 2007–08 Junior Grand Prix Final	Gdańsk, Poland		

== Series notes ==
Pairs champions Vera Bazarova and Yuri Larionov were retroactively disqualified from the Junior Grand Prix Final due to a positive test on a doping sample which Larionov had given before the competition. All other teams consequently moved up one spot. This change caused fourth-place finishers Jessica Rose Paetsch and Jon Nuss to earn a spot on the podium at the Final.

== Qualifying ==
Skaters who reached the age of 13 by July 1, 2007 but had not turned 19 (singles and females of the other two disciplines) or 21 (male pair skaters and ice dancers) were eligible to compete on the junior circuit. Unlike the senior ISU Grand Prix of Figure Skating, skaters for the Junior Grand Prix are entered by their national federations rather than seeded by the ISU. The number of entries allotted to each ISU member federation is determined by their skaters' placements at the previous season's World Junior Figure Skating Championships in each respective discipline.

For the 2007–08 season, in singles, the five best placed member nations at the 2007 World Junior Figure Skating Championships could enter two skaters in all eight events. Member nations who placed sixth through tenth could enter one skater in all eight events. Member nations with a skater who had qualified for the free skate at Junior Worlds may enter one skater in seven of the events. Member nations who did not qualify for the free skate but placed 25th through 30th in the short program could enter one skater in six of the events. All other nations could enter one skater in five of the events.

In pair skating, member nations could enter up to three teams per event. The host nation is allowed to enter as many pair teams as it wishes. Pairs were contested at four events out of eight.

In ice dance, member nations could enter one dance team per event. Member nations who placed in the top five at the 2007 Junior Worlds could enter a second dance team.

The host country was allowed to enter up to three skaters or teams in singles and dance in their event, and there were no limit to the number of pairs teams.

== Qualifiers ==
The following skaters qualified for the Junior Grand Prix Final.

No.	Men	Women	Pairs	Ice dance
1	(United States) Brandon Mroz	(United States) Mirai Nagasu	(Russia) Vera Bazarova / Yuri Larionov	(Canada) Vanessa Crone / Paul Poirier
2	(United States) Adam Rippon	(Japan) Yuki Nishino	(Russia) Ekaterina Sheremetieva / Mikhail Kuznetsov	(United States) Emily Samuelson / Evan Bates
3	(China) Guan Jinlin	(United States) Chrissy Hughes	(Russia) Ksenia Krasilnikova / Konstantin Bezmaternikh	(Russia) Maria Monko / Ilia Tkachenko
4	(United States) Austin Kanallakan	(United States) Rachael Flatt	(United States) Jessica Rose Paetsch / Jon Nuss	(Russia) Kristina Gorshkova / Vitali Butikov
5	(Russia) Artem Borodulin	(Finland) Jenni Vähämaa	(China) Zhang Yue / Wang Lei	(United States) Madison Chock / Greg Zuerlein
6	(United States) Armin Mahbanoozadeh	(Estonia) Svetlana Issakova	(Canada) Amanda Velenosi / Mark Fernandez	(Italy) Isabella Pajardi / Stefano Caruso
7	(Russia) Ivan Bariev	(United States) Alexe Gilles	(Russia) Anastaisa Khodkova / Pavel Sliusarenko	(Russia) Ekaterina Riazanova / John Guerreiro
8	(Russia) Artur Gachinski	(United States) Kristine Musademba	(United States) Bianca Butler / Joseph Jacobsen	(Canada) Joanna Lenko / Mitchell Islam

Alternates

No.	Men	Women	Pairs	Ice dance
1	(United States) Douglas Razzano	(Japan) Rumi Suizu	(Canada) Olivia Jones / Donald Jackson	(Ukraine) Alisa Agafonova / Dmitri Dun
2	(Japan) Takahito Mura	(Russia) Alena Leonova	(Canada) Carolyn MacCuish / Andrew Evans	(Czech Republic) Lucie Myslivečková / Matěj Novák
3	(Russia) Artem Grigoriev	(United States) Blake Rosenthal	(Estonia) Maria Sergejeva / Ilja Glebov	(Russia) Ksenia Monko / Kirill Khaliavin

Pair skaters Krystyna Klimczak / Janusz Karweta were given the host wildcard spot to the Junior Grand Prix Final.

== Medalists ==
=== Men ===
Competition	Gold	Silver	Bronze	Details
United States	(United States) Armin Mahbanoozadeh	(United States) Austin Kanallakan	(Russia) Artem Grigoriev	
Romania	(United States) Adam Rippon	(Russia) Ivan Bariev	(Japan) Takahito Mura	
Austria	(United States) Brandon Mroz	(China) Guan Jinlin	(Russia) Artem Borodulin	
Estonia	(China) Guan Jinlin	(Russia) Artur Gachinski	(China) Yang Chao	
Croatia	(United States) Austin Kanallakan	(Russia) Ivan Bariev	(United States) Armin Mahbanoozadeh	
Bulgaria	(Russia) Artem Borodulin	(United States) Adam Rippon	(Canada) Jeremy Ten	
Germany	(United States) Brandon Mroz	(Czech Republic) Michal Březina	(Japan) Takahito Mura	
Great Britain	(Japan) Tatsuki Machida	(United States) Douglas Razzano	(Russia) Artem Grigoriev	
Final	(United States) Adam Rippon	(United States) Brandon Mroz	(United States) Armin Mahbanoozadeh	

=== Ladies ===
Competition	Gold	Silver	Bronze	Details
United States	(United States) Mirai Nagasu	(United States) Alexe Gilles	(United States) Angela Maxwell	
Romania	(United States) Chrissy Hughes	(Russia) Alena Leonova	(Japan) Rumi Suizu	
Austria	(United States) Rachael Flatt	(United States) Kristine Musademba	(Finland) Jenni Vähämaa	
Estonia	(Japan) Yuki Nishino	(United States) Blake Rosenthal	(Estonia) Svetlana Issakova	
Croatia	(United States) Mirai Nagasu	(Finland) Jenni Vähämaa	(South Korea) Kim Na-Young	
Bulgaria	(United States) Chrissy Hughes	(Japan) Satsuki Muramoto	(Russia) Jana Smekhnova	
Germany	(Germany) Sarah Hecken	(United States) Rachael Flatt	(Japan) Rumi Suizu	
Great Britain	(Japan) Yuki Nishino	(Estonia) Svetlana Issakova	(Spain) Sonia Lafuente	
Final	(United States) Mirai Nagasu	(United States) Rachael Flatt	(Japan) Yuki Nishino	

=== Pairs ===
Competition	Gold	Silver	Bronze	Details
United States	(Canada) Olivia Jones / Donald Jackson	(Canada) Carolyn MacCuish / Andrew Evans	(Russia) Anastasia Khodkova / Pavel Sliusarenko	
Estonia	(Russia) Ekaterina Sheremetieva / Mikhail Kuznetsov	(Canada) Amanda Velenosi / Mark Fernandez	(China) Zhang Yue / Wang Lei	
Germany	(United States) Jessica Rose Paetsch / Jon Nuss	(Russia) Vera Bazarova / Yuri Larionov	(Russia) Ksenia Krasilnikova / Konstantin Bezmaternikh	
Great Britain	(Russia) Vera Bazarova / Yuri Larionov	(Russia) Ksenia Krasilnikova / Konstantin Bezmaternikh	(China) Zhang Yue / Wang Lei	
Final	~~(Russia) Vera Bazarova / Yuri Larionov~~^{†} (Russia) Ksenia Krasilnikova / Konstantin Bezmaternikh	(Russia) Ekaterina Sheremetieva / Mikhail Kuznetsov	(United States) Jessica Rose Paetsch / Jon Nuss	

^{†}Bazarova / Larionov were later disqualified from the competition due to a positive doping sample from Larionov.

=== Ice dance ===
Competition	Gold	Silver	Bronze	Details
United States	(United States) Emily Samuelson / Evan Bates	(Canada) Joanna Lenko / Mitchell Islam	(United States) Pilar Bosley / John Corona	
Romania	(Canada) Vanessa Crone / Paul Poirier	(Russia) Ekaterina Riazanova / John Guerreiro	(Russia) Ksenia Monko / Kirill Khaliavin	
Austria	(United States) Emily Samuelson / Evan Bates	(Russia) Maria Monko / Ilia Tkachenko	(Italy) Isabella Pajardi / Stefano Caruso	
Estonia	(United States) Madison Chock / Greg Zuerlein	(Ukraine) Alisa Agafonova / Dmitri Dun	(Canada) Joanna Lenko / Mitchell Islam	
Croatia	(Canada) Vanessa Crone / Paul Poirier	(Russia) Kristina Gorshkova / Vitali Butikov	(Russia) Ksenia Monko / Kirill Khaliavin	
Bulgaria	(Italy) Isabella Pajardi / Stefano Caruso	(United States) Shannon Wingle / Ryan Devereaux	(Ukraine) Anastasia Vykhodtseva / Alexei Shumski	
Germany	(Russia) Kristina Gorshkova / Vitali Butikov	(Russia) Ekaterina Riazanova / John Guerreiro	(United States) Madison Chock / Greg Zuerlein	
Great Britain	(Russia) Maria Monko / Ilia Tkachenko	(Czech Republic) Lucie Myslivečková / Matěj Novák	(Ukraine) Nadezhda Frolenkova / Mikhail Kasalo	
Final	(Russia) Maria Monko / Ilia Tkachenko	(United States) Emily Samuelson / Evan Bates	(Russia) Kristina Gorshkova / Vitali Butikov	

== Medals table ==
Rank	Nation	Gold	Silver	Bronze	Total
1	United States (USA)	16	11	5	32
2	Russia (RUS)	7	11	10	28
3	Canada (CAN)	3	3	2	8
4	Japan (JPN)	3	1	5	9
5	China (CHN)	1	1	3	5
6	Italy (ITA)	1	0	1	2
7	Germany (GER)	1	0	0	1
8	Czech Republic (CZE)	0	2	0	2
9	Ukraine (UKR)	0	1	2	3
10	Estonia (EST)	0	1	1	2
10	Finland (FIN)	0	1	1	2
12	South Korea (KOR)	0	0	1	1
12	Spain (ESP)	0	0	1	1
Totals (13 entries)		32	32	32	96
