= ISU Junior Grand Prix in Croatia =

International figure skating competition

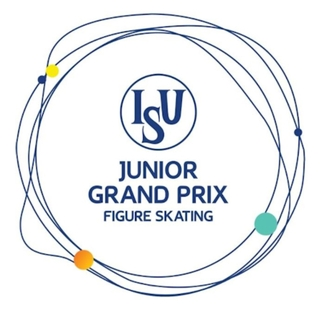
- Status: Inactive
- Genre: ISU Junior Grand Prix
- Frequency: Occasional
- Location: Zagreb
- Country: Croatia
- Inaugurated: 1999
- Most recent: 2019
- Organizer: Croatian Skating Federation

The ISU Junior Grand Prix in Croatia – also known as the Croatia Cup – is an international figure skating competition sanctioned by the International Skating Union (ISU), organized and hosted by the Croatian Skating Federation (Croatian: Hrvatski klizački savez). It is held periodically as an event of the ISU Junior Grand Prix of Figure Skating (JGP), a series of international competitions exclusively for junior-level skaters. Medals may be awarded in men's singles, women's singles, pair skating, and ice dance. Skaters earn points based on their results at the qualifying competitions each season, and the top skaters or teams in each discipline are invited to then compete at the Junior Grand Prix of Figure Skating Final.

== History ==
The ISU Junior Grand Prix of Figure Skating (JGP) was established by the International Skating Union (ISU) in 1997 and consists of a series of seven international figure skating competitions exclusively for junior-level skaters. The locations of the Junior Grand Prix events change every year. While all seven competitions feature the men's, women's, and ice dance events, only four competitions each season feature the pairs event. Skaters earn points based on their results each season, and the top skaters or teams in each discipline are then invited to compete at the Junior Grand Prix of Figure Skating Final.

Skaters are eligible to compete on the junior-level circuit if they are at least 13 years old before 1 July of the respective season, but not yet 19 (for single skaters), 21 (for men and women in ice dance and women in pair skating), or 23 (for men in pair skating). Competitors are chosen by their respective skating federations. The number of entries allotted to each ISU member nation in each discipline is determined by their results at the prior World Junior Figure Skating Championships.

Croatia hosted its first Junior Grand Prix competition in 1999 in Zagreb. Florian Just of Germany won the men's event, Olga Stepanova of Russia won the women's event, Aljona Savchenko and Stanislav Morozov of Ukraine won the pairs event, and Svetlana Kulikova and Arseni Markov of Russia won the ice dance event.

The event has been held repeatedly since 1999. The 2019 event was the competition's most recent iteration. Croatia was scheduled to host a Junior Grand Prix event in 2022, but cancelled it, citing "logistical reasons". The competition was instead re-allocated to Poland, who hosted two back-to-back competitions in Gdańsk.

== Medalists ==
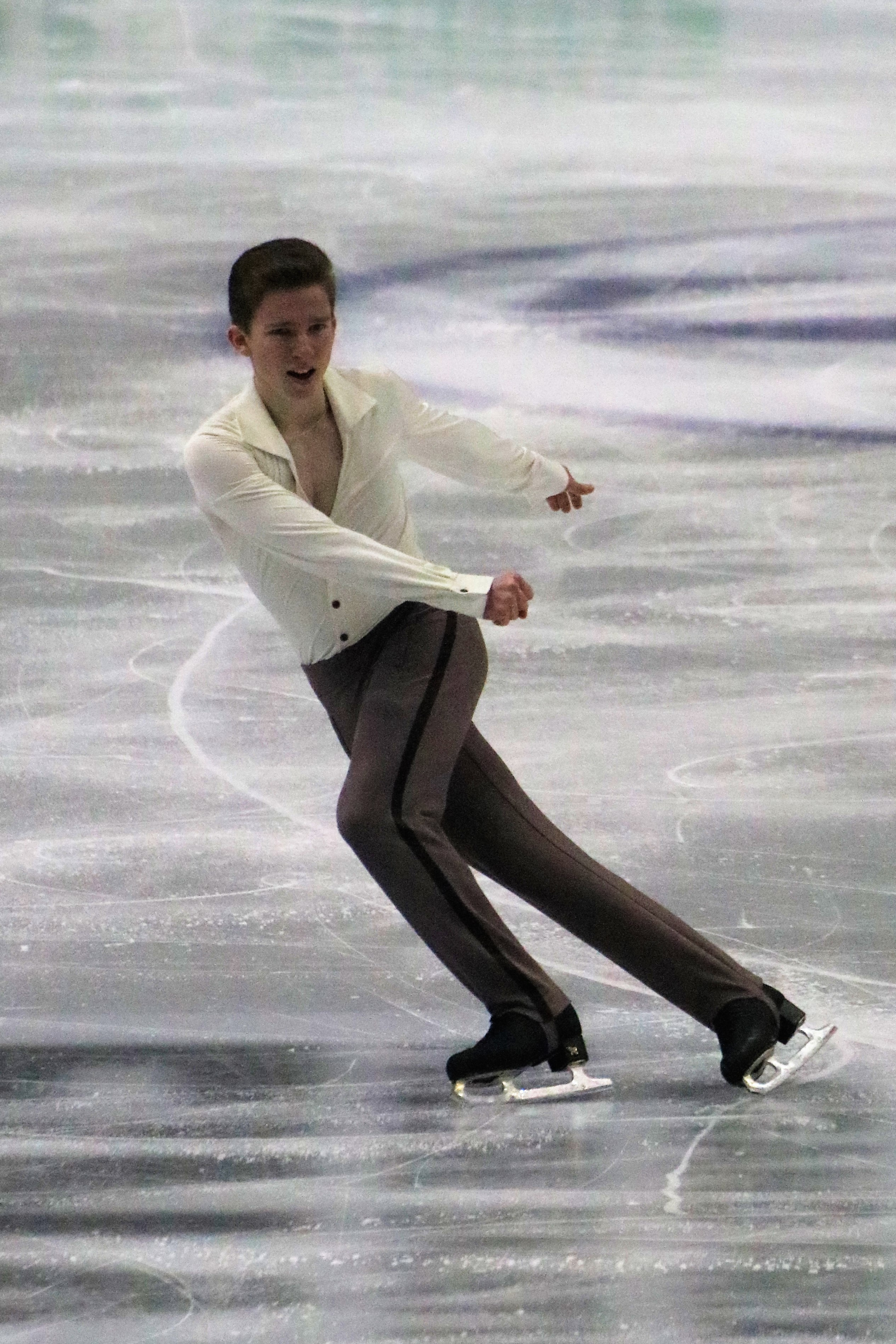
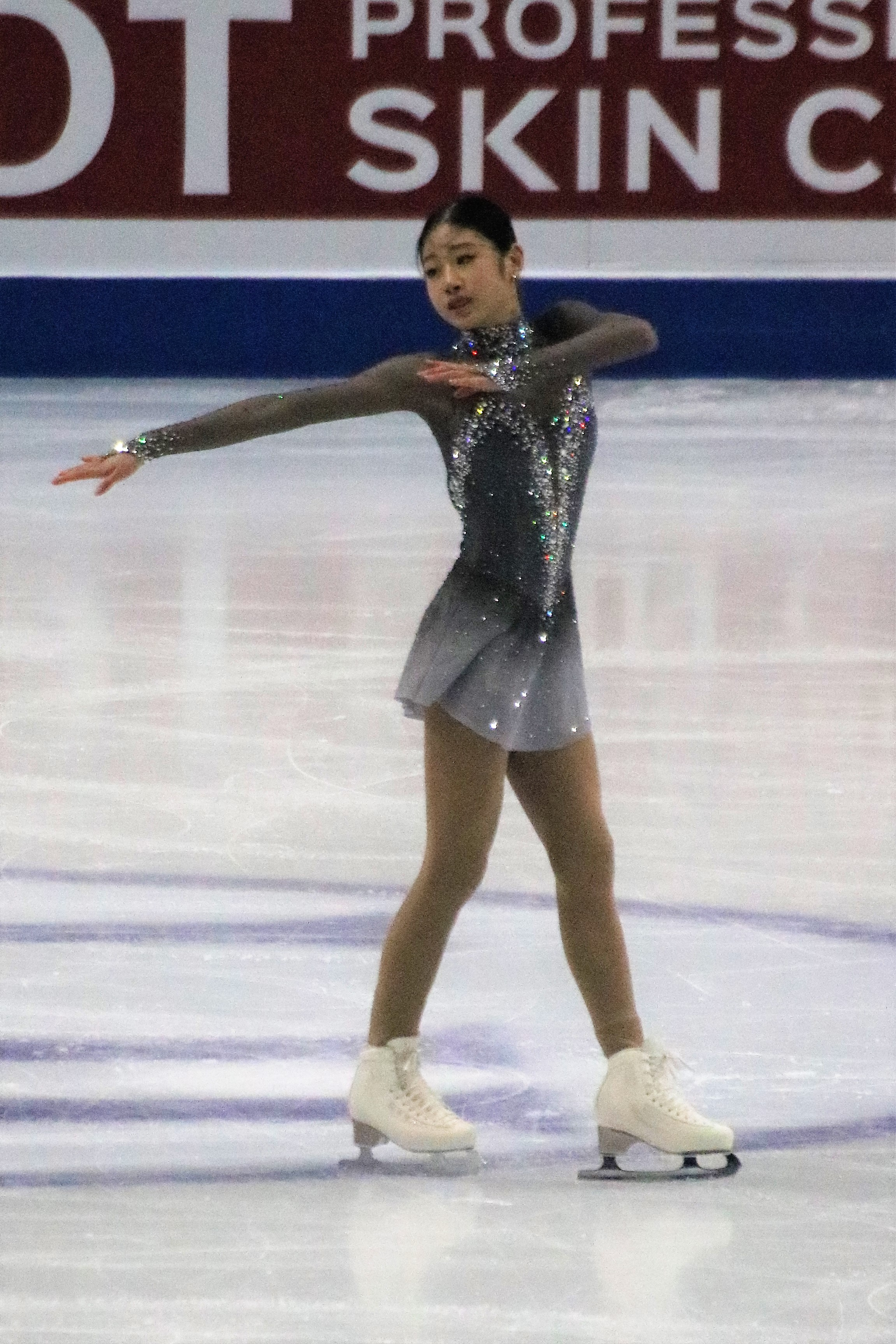
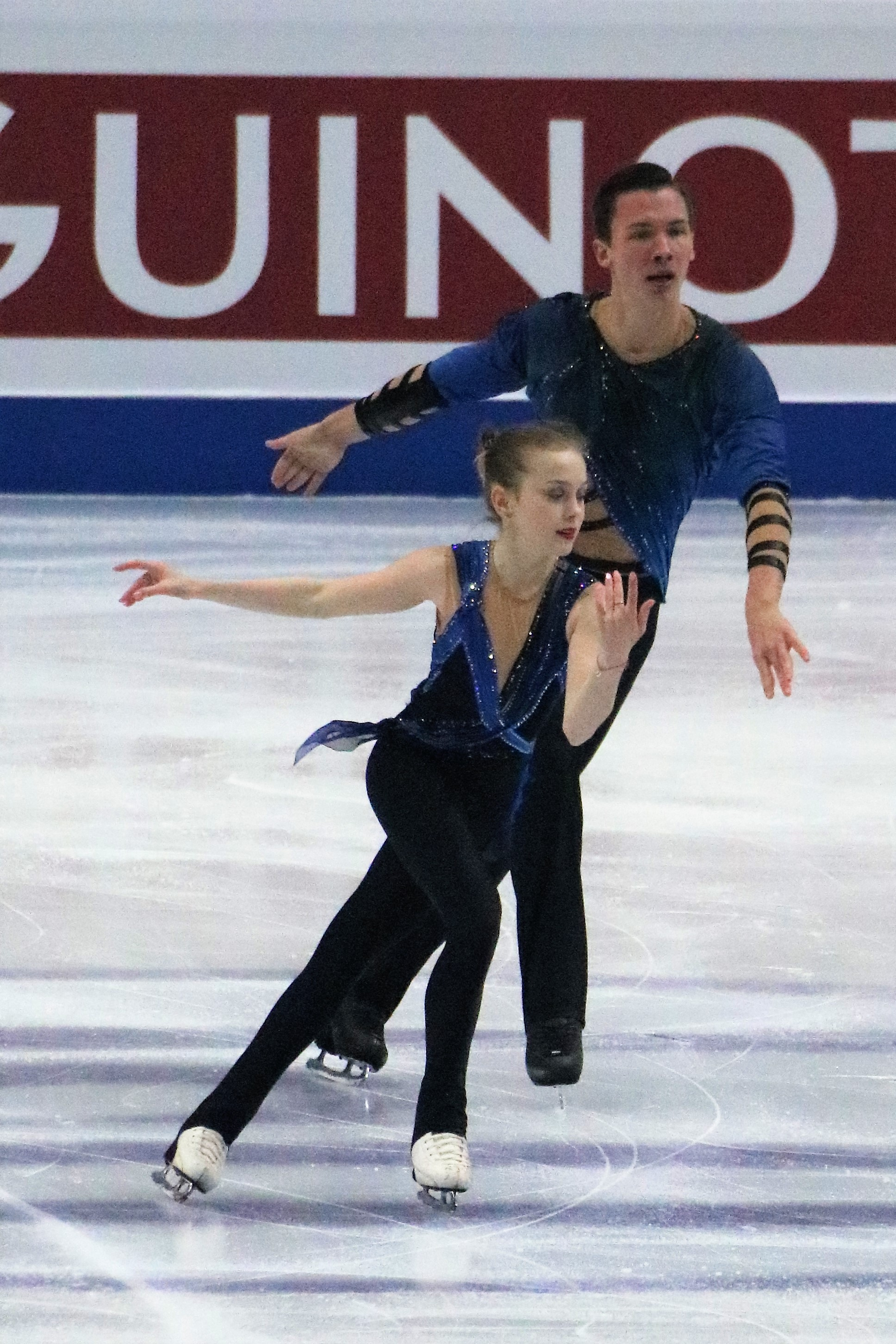
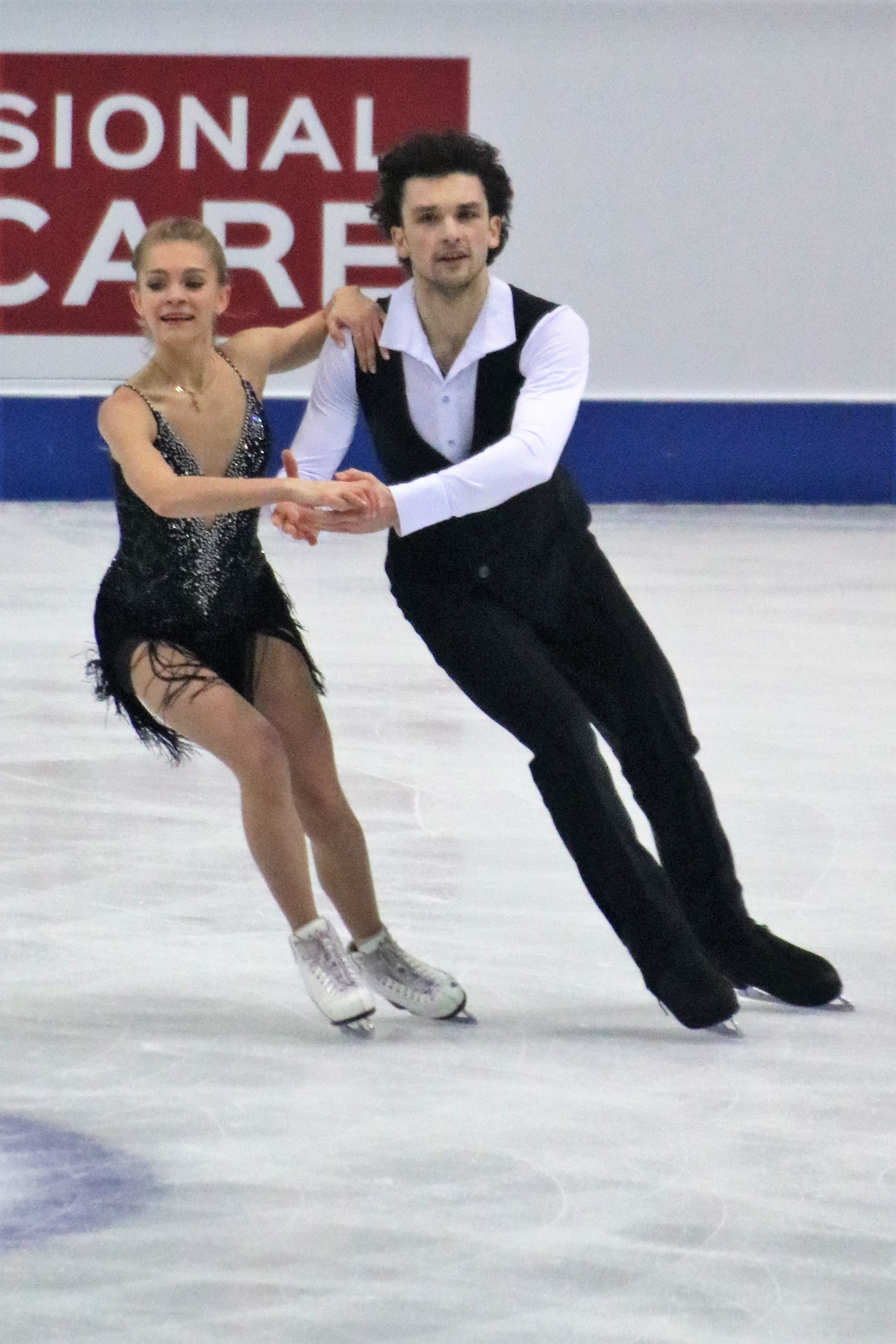
The 2019 Croatia Cup champions: Andrei Mozalev of Russia (men's singles); Lee Hae-in of South Korea (women's singles); Iuliia Artemeva and Mikhail Nazarychev of Russia (pair skating); and Maria Kazakova and Georgy Reviya of Georgia (ice dance)

=== Men's singles ===
Men's event medalists
Year	Location	Gold	Silver	Bronze	Ref.
1999	Zagreb	(Germany) Florian Just	(France) Laurent Porteret	(Russia) Denis Balandin	
2003	Zagreb	(United States) Evan Lysacek	(France) Alban Préaubert	(Russia) Sergei Dobrin	
2005	Zagreb	(Sweden) Adrian Schultheiss	(United States) Geoffrey Varner	(Japan) Ryo Shibata	
2007	Zagreb	(United States) Austin Kanallakan	(Russia) Ivan Bariev	(United States) Armin Mahbanoozadeh	
2009	Zagreb	(Japan) Yuzuru Hanyu	(United States) Ross Miner	(Russia) Zhan Bush	
2012	Zagreb	(Russia) Maxim Kovtun	(China) Yan Han	(United States) Harrison Choate	
2014	Zagreb	(Japan) Shoma Uno	(United States) Nathan Chen	(South Korea) Lee June-hyoung	
2015	Zagreb	(Russia) Alexander Samarin	(Canada) Nicolas Nadeau	(United States) Tomoki Hiwatashi	
2017	Zagreb	(United States) Alexei Krasnozhon	(Canada) Joseph Phan	(Russia) Makar Ignatov	
2019	Zagreb	(Russia) Andrei Mozalev	(Russia) Artur Danielian	(Japan) Shun Sato	

=== Women's singles ===
Women's event medalists
Year	Location	Gold	Silver	Bronze	Ref.
1999	Zagreb	(Russia) Olga Stepanova	(Russia) Svetlana Bukareva	(Ukraine) Svitlana Pylypenko	
2003	Zagreb	(United States) Danielle Kahle	(Canada) Myriane Samson	(Russia) Elena Naumova	
2005	Zagreb	(Russia) Veronika Kropotina	(Japan) Nana Takeda	(United States) Christine Zukowski	
2007	Zagreb	(United States) Mirai Nagasu	(Finland) Jenni Vähämaa	(South Korea) Kim Na-Young	
2009	Zagreb	(Japan) Kanako Murakami	(Canada) Kate Charbonneau	(United States) Ellie Kawamura	
2012	Zagreb	(United States) Angela Wang	(United States) Hannah Miller	(Russia) Anna Pogorilaya	
2014	Zagreb	(Russia) Maria Sotskova	(United States) Karen Chen	(Russia) Alexandra Proklova	
2015	Zagreb	(Japan) Marin Honda	(Japan) Wakaba Higuchi	(Russia) Diana Pervushkina	
2017	Zagreb	(Russia) Sofia Samodurova	(Japan) Mako Yamashita	(Russia) Anastasia Tarakanova	
2019	Zagreb	(South Korea) Lee Hae-in	(Russia) Daria Usacheva	(Russia) Anna Frolova	

=== Pairs ===
Pairs event medalists
Year	Location	Gold	Silver	Bronze	Ref.
1999	Zagreb	(Ukraine); Aljona Savchenko; Stanislav Morozov	(Russia); Milica Brozović; Anton Nimenko	(Canada); Anne Powers; Jamie Campbell	
2003	Zagreb	(United States); Andrea Varraux; David Pelletier	(United States); Amy Howerton; Steven Pottenger	(Russia); Anastasia Kuzmina; Stanislav Evdokimov	
2005	Zagreb	(United States); Bridget Namiotka; John Coughlin	(Russia); Ksenia Krasilnikova; Konstantin Bezmaternikh	(United States); Julia Vlassov; Drew Meekins	
2007	Zagreb	No pairs competitions			
2009	Zagreb	No pairs competitions			
2012	Zagreb	(Canada); Margaret Purdy; Michael Marinaro	(China); Yu Xiaoyu; Jin Yang	(Russia); Vasilisa Davankova; Andrei Deputat	
2014	Zagreb	(Russia); Maria Vigalova; Egor Zakroev	(Russia); Daria Beklemisheva; Maxim Bobrov	(Ukraine); Renata Oganesian; Mark Bardei	
2015	Zagreb	No pairs competition			
2017	Zagreb	(Russia); Polina Kostiukovich; Dmitrii Ialin	(China); Gao Yumeng; Xie Zhong	(Russia); Aleksandra Boikova; Dmitrii Kozlovskii	
2019	Zagreb	(Russia); Iuliia Artemeva; Mikhail Nazarychev	(Russia); Diana Mukhametzianova; Ilya Mironov	(Germany); Annika Hocke; Robert Kunkel	

=== Ice dance ===
Ice dance event medalists
Year	Location	Gold	Silver	Bronze	Ref.
1999	Zagreb	(Russia); Svetlana Kulikova; Arseni Markov	(France); Caroline Truong; Sylvain Longchambon	(Italy); Valentina Anselmi; Fabrizio Pedrazzini	
2003	Zagreb	(United States); Morgan Matthews; Maxim Zavozin	(Russia); Olga Orlova; Maxim Bolotin	(Italy); Camilla Spelta; Luca Lanotte	
2005	Zagreb	(Russia); Natalia Mikhailova; Arkadi Sergeev	(United States); Trina Pratt; Todd Gilles	(Russia); Kristina Gorshkova; Vitali Butikov	
2007	Zagreb	(Canada); Vanessa Crone; Paul Poirier	(Russia); Kristina Gorshkova; Vitali Butikov	(Russia); Ksenia Monko; Kirill Khaliavin	
2009	Zagreb	(United States); Maia Shibutani; Alex Shibutani	(Canada); Kharis Ralph; Asher Hill	(Russia); Tatiana Baturintseva; Ivan Volobuiev	
2012	Zagreb	(Russia); Valeria Zenkova; Valerie Sinitsin	(Russia); Evgenia Kosigina; Nikolai Moroshkin	(United States); Rachel Parsons; Michael Parsons	
2014	Zagreb	(Russia); Anna Yanovskaya; Sergey Mozgov	(United States); Rachel Parsons; Michael Parsons	(Hungary); Carolina Moscheni; Ádám Lukács	
2015	Zagreb	(United States); Rachel Parsons; Michael Parsons	(Russia); Anastasia Skoptsova; Kirill Aleshin	(Russia); Sofia Shevchenko; Igor Eremenko	
2017	Zagreb	(Canada); Marjorie Lajoie; Zachary Lagha	(Russia); Sofia Shevchenko; Igor Eremenko	(Russia); Ksenia Konkina; Grigory Yakushev	
2019	Zagreb	(Georgia (country)); Maria Kazakova; Georgy Reviya	(Russia); Sofya Tyutyunina; Alexander Shustitskiy	(Canada); Emmy Bronsard; Aissa Bouaraguia	
