= Jenni Vähämaa =

Finnish figure skater

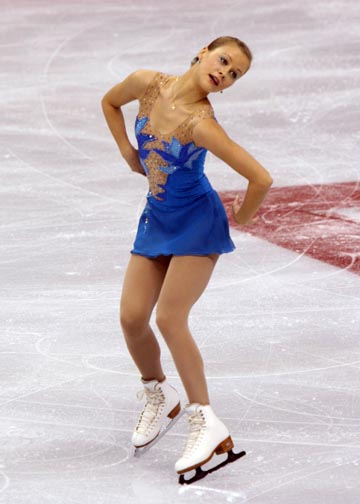
- Vähämaa at the 2008 Skate Canada.

Personal information
- Born: 26 May 1992 (age 34) Lohja, Finland
- Height: 1.58 m (5 ft 2 in)

Figure skating career
- Country: Finland
- Coach: Virpi Horttana, Ludmilla Gangnus
- Skating club: Espoon Jäätaiturit
- Retired: 2009

Jenni Vähämaa (born 26 May 1992) is a Finnish former figure skater. She is the 2007 Finlandia Trophy champion and placed in the top ten at four ISU Championships, including the 2008 European Championships.

== Career ==
Vähämaa started skating at age four. She made her senior international debut at the 2007 Finlandia Trophy, which she won. She missed the 2008 Finnish Championships due to a time conflict with the Junior Grand Prix Final. She qualified for the 2008 Europeans from her scores at other competitions. It was her first senior ISU Championships. She placed 10th.

Vähämaa turned fully senior for the 2008–2009 season. She placed 8th at the 2008 Skate Canada International. She had been assigned to the 2008 Cup of Russia but withdrew before the event due to injury. She missed the rest of the season because of injury.

== Programs ==
Season	Short program	Free program	Exhibition
2008–09	Howl's Moving Castle Soundtrack by Joe Hisaishi	West Side Story Soundtrack	
2007–08	O mio babbino caro from Gianni Schicchi by Giacomo Puccini	Rhapsody on a Theme of Paganini, op.43 by Sergei Rachmaninoff	"A Moment Like This" by Kelly Clarkson
2006–07	O mio babbino caro from Gianni Schicchi by Giacomo Puccini	Rhapsody on a Theme of Paganini, op.43 by Sergei Rachmaninoff	
2005–06	"Reflections of Passion" by Yanni	Mack and Mabel by Jerry Herman	"Con te partirò" by Andrea Bocelli

== Competitive highlights ==
GP: Grand Prix; JGP: Junior Grand Prix

International
Event	05–06	06–07	07–08	08–09
European Champ.			10th	
GP Skate Canada				10th
Finlandia Trophy			1st	8th
International: Junior
World Junior Champ.	8th	4th	4th	
JGP Final			5th	
JGP Austria			3rd	
JGP Croatia			2nd	
JGP Czech Republic		10th		
JGP Norway		5th		
JGP Poland	19th			
Nordics	1st J	1st J		
National
Finnish Champ.	2nd J	1st J		

== Detailed results ==
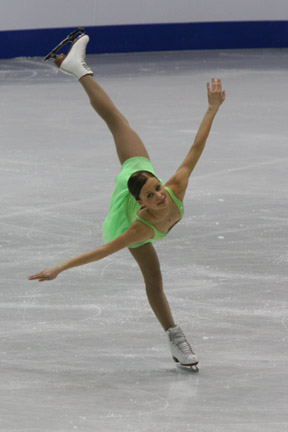
Vähämaa performs a forward outside edge spiral during her short program at the 2008 World Junior Championships.

2008–2009 Season
Date	Event	SP	FS	Total
October 31 – November 2, 2008	2008 Skate Canada International	10; 44.90	10; 77.85	10; 122.75
October 9 – 12, 2008	2008 Finlandia Trophy	10; 43.76	7; 84.96	8; 128.72

2007–2008 Season
Date	Event	Level	SP	FS	Total
March 17–23, 2008	2008 World Junior Figure Skating Championships	Junior	6; 50.30	4; 92.24	4; 142.54
January 22–28, 2008	2008 European Figure Skating Championships	Senior	12; 47.05	7; 95.35	10; 142.40
December 6–9, 2007	2007–2008 ISU Junior Grand Prix Final	Junior	5; 46.68	5; 83.82	5; 130.50
October 12 – 14, 2007	2007 Finlandia Trophy	Senior	6; 51.22	1; 112.07	1; 163.29
September 27–30, 2007	2007 ISU Junior Grand Prix, Croatia	Junior	2; 48.38	3; 84.06	2; 132.44
September 13–16, 2007	2007 ISU Junior Grand Prix, Austria	Junior	3; 47.94	3; 77.49	3; 125.43

2006–2007 Season
Date	Event	SP	FS	Total
March 6–12, 2006	2007 World Junior Figure Skating Championships	6; 47.50	4; 91.10	4; 138.61
October 19–22, 2006	2006 ISU Junior Grand Prix, Czech Republic	17; 33.63	6; 71.20	10; 104.83
28 Sept – 1 Oct, 2006	2006 ISU Junior Grand Prix, Norway	10; 37.96	3; 71.13	5; 109.09

2005–2006 Season
Date	Event	SP	FS	Total
February 26 – March 3, 2006	2006 World Junior Figure Skating Championships	9; 42.76	6; 79.12	8; 121.88
October 13–16, 2005	2005 ISU Junior Grand Prix, Poland	12; 36.37	20; 55.74	19; 92.11
