= Yuki Nishino =

Japanese figure skater

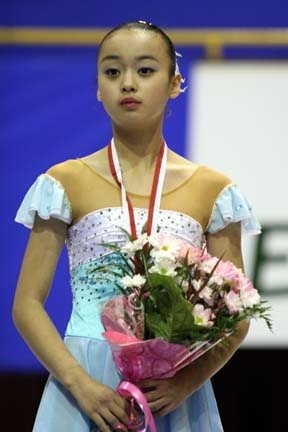
- Nishino on the 2007 Junior Grand Prix Final podium

Personal information
- Born: September 10, 1993 (age 33) Osaka Prefecture, Japan
- Home town: Tokyo
- Height: 1.58 m (5 ft 2 in)

Figure skating career
- Country: Japan
- Coach: Shin Amano; Yutaka Higuchi; Noriko Sato
- Skating club: Musashino Gakuin Tokyo
- Began skating: 1999
Medal record
Representing Japan
Figure skating: Ladies' singles
Junior Grand Prix Final
Bronze medal – third place	2007–08 Gdansk	Ladies' singles

Yuki Nishino

Japanese name
- Kanji: 西野 友毬
- Kana: にしの ゆうき
Transcriptions
- Romanization: Nishino Yūki

Yuki Nishino (西野 友毬, Nishino Yūki; born September 10, 1993 in Osaka) is a Japanese former figure skater. She is the 2007 Junior Grand Prix Final bronze medalist and represented Japan at two World Junior Championships. She won silver medals at two senior internationals, the 2011 NRW Trophy and 2012 Gardena Spring Trophy.

== Programs ==
Season	Short program	Free skating	Exhibition
2011–2012	O mio babbino caro by Giacomo Puccini	Piano Concert No. 1 by Pyotr I. Tchaikovsky	
2010–2011	O mio babbino caro by Giacomo Puccini	Le Corsaire by Riccardo Drigo	
2009–2010	Introduction and Rondo Capriccioso by Camille Saint-Saëns	Le Corsaire by Riccardo Drigo	
2008–2009	Introduction and Rondo Capriccioso by Camille Saint-Saëns	Rhapsody on a Theme of Paganini by Sergei Rachmaninoff	
2007–2008	Leyenda by Vanessa-Mae	Sleeping Beauty by Pyotr I. Tchaikovsky	Bei Mir Bistu Shein (from Swing Kids) by Janis Siegel

== Competitive highlights ==
International
Event	03–04	04–05	05–06	06–07	07–08	08–09	09–10	10–11	11–12	12–13	13–14	14–15	15–16
Ondrej Nepela							4th			7th			
NRW Trophy									2nd				
Gardena									2nd				
Bavarian Open										8th			
Universiade											6th		
International: Junior
Junior Worlds					5th			12th					
JGP Final					3rd								
JGP Belarus							2nd						
JGP Estonia					1st				5th				
JGP France						15th							
JGP Romania								7th	4th				
JGP Turkey							6th						
JGP U.K.					1st			3rd					
Asian Trophy					1st J	1st J							
Mladost Trophy				1st N									
National
Japan					10th		16th	6th	8th	7th	21st	14th	18th
Japan Junior			16th	6th	2nd	5th		5th					
Japan Novice	5th B	1st B	2nd A	1st A									
Levels: N = Novice; J = Junior. JGP = Junior Grand Prix

== Detailed results ==
2011–2012 season
Date	Event	Level	SP	FS	Total
October 12–15, 2011	2011 Junior Grand Prix, Estonia	Junior	4; 50.04	8; 82.36	5; 132.40
September 21–24, 2011	2011 Junior Grand Prix, Romania	Junior	3; 47.71	6; 78.14	4; 125.85
2010–2011 season
Date	Event	Level	SP	FS	Total
February 28 - March 6, 2011	2011 World Junior Championships	Junior	11; 46.09	15; 75.05	12; 121.14
December 24–26, 2010	2010-2011 Japan Championships	Senior	6; 57.02	7; 100.07	6; 157.09
September 29 - October 3, 2010	2010 Junior Grand Prix, Germany	Junior	3; 51.96	4; 83.62	3; 135.58
September 8–12, 2010	2010 Junior Grand Prix, Romania	Junior	1; 48.98	10; 67.83	7; 116.81
2009–2010 season
Date	Event	Level	SP	FS	Total
December 25–27, 2009	2009-2010 Japanese Championships	Senior	14; 53.26	16; 84.96	16; 138.22
November 5–7, 2009	2009 Ondrej Nepela Memorial	Senior	9 -	2 -	4; 122.19
October 14–18, 2009	2009 Junior Grand Prix, Turkey	Junior	4; 48.18	7; 75.77	6; 123.95
September 23–27, 2009	2009 Junior Grand Prix, Belarus	Junior	6; 44.68	2; 97.13	2; 141.81
2008–2009 season
Date	Event	Level	SP	FS	Total
December 25–27, 2008	2008-2009 Japanese Junior Championships	Junior	4; 51.44	6; 89.59	5; 141.03
September 20–23, 2007	2008 Junior Grand Prix, France	Junior	13; 37.41	13; 62.58	15; 99.99
July 2008	2008 Asian Trophy	Junior	1	1	1
2007–2008 season
Date	Event	Level	SP	FS	Total
February 25 - March 2, 2008	2008 World Junior Championships	Junior	4; 54.15	6; 85.29	5; 139.44
February 1–4, 2005	2007-2008 Japan Championships	Senior	10; 48.94	11; 88.57	10; 137.51
February 1–4, 2005	2007-2008 Japanese Junior Championships	Junior	2; 52.44	3; 85.72	2; 138.16
December 6–9, 2007	2007–2008 ISU Junior Grand Prix Final	Junior	2; 54.63	3; 102.74	3; 149.42
October 18–21, 2007	2007 Junior Grand Prix, Great Britain	Junior	2; 50.46	1; 83.58	1; 134.04
September 20–23, 2007	2007 Junior Grand Prix, Estonia	Junior	1; 51.88	1; 92.24	1; 144.12
July 20–22, 2007	2007 Asian Trophy	Junior	1; 44.26	1; 79.12	1; 123.38
2006–2007 season
Date	Event	Level	SP	FS	Total
December 27–29, 2006	2006-2007 Japanese Junior Championships	Junior	19; 35.92	4; 85.91	6; 121.83
October 28–29, 2006	2006-2007 Japanese Novice Championships	Novice	-	1; 89.69	1; 89.69
2005–2006 season
Date	Event	Level	SP	FS	Total
December 23–25, 2005	2005-2006 Japanese Junior Championships	Junior	14; 40.06	16; 66.06	16; 106.21
October 29–30, 2005	2005-2006 Japanese Novice Championships	Novice	-	2; 72.56	2; 72.56
