= Lukáš Csölley =

Slovak ice dancer

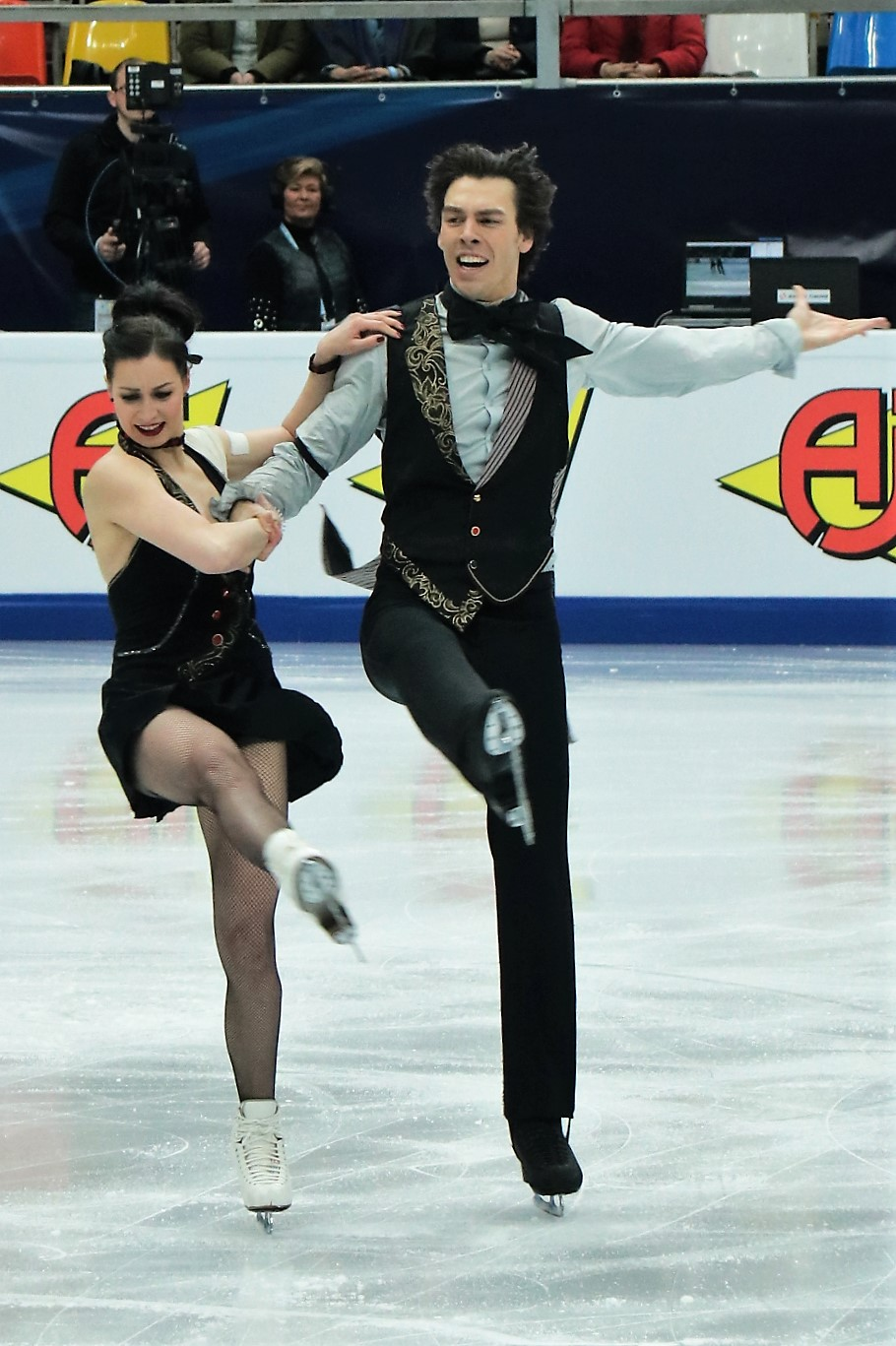
- Myslivečková and Csölley in 2018

Personal information
- Born: 18 June 1990 (age 36) Bratislava, Czechoslovakia
- Height: 1.86 m (6 ft 1 in)

Figure skating career
- Country: Slovakia
- Discipline: Ice dance
- Partner: Lucie Myslivečková, Federica Testa, Nikola Višňová
- Coach: Roberto Pelizzola, Paola Mezzadri, Raffaella Cazzaniga, N. Lunghi, Hendryk Schamberger, Gabriela Hrázská
- Skating club: SKP Bratislava
- Began skating: 1995
- Retired: June 28, 2018

Medal record
Slovak Championships
Gold medal – first place	2009 Třinec	Ice dance
Gold medal – first place	2010 Cieszyn	Ice dance
Gold medal – first place	2011 Žilina	Ice dance
Gold medal – first place	2012 Ostrava	Ice dance
Gold medal – first place	2014 Bratislava	Ice dance
Gold medal – first place	2015 Budapest	Ice dance
Gold medal – first place	2016 Třinec	Ice dance
Gold medal – first place	2017 Katowice	Ice dance
Gold medal – first place	2018 Košice	Ice dance

Lukáš Csölley (born 18 June 1990) is a Slovak former competitive ice dancer. With Lucie Myslivečková, he competed at the 2018 Winter Olympics in Pyeongchang, South Korea. With Federica Testa, he won four ISU Challenger Series medals and bronze at the 2015 Winter Universiade. They finished in the top ten at the 2015 and 2016 European Championships.

== Career ==
=== Early years ===
Csölley started learning to skate in 1995. He competed in singles until the age of 16.

=== Partnership with Višňová ===
In 2006, Csölley switched to ice dancing and teamed up with Nikola Višňová from the Czech Republic. They decided to represent Slovakia. In their first two seasons, they trained under Gabriela Hrázská in Brno, Bratislava, and Oberstdorf. They finished 19th at the 2007 World Junior Championships in Oberstdorf and 17th at the 2008 World Junior Championships in Sofia.

In the 2008–2009 season, Višňová/Csölley trained in Berlin, Oberstdorf, and Brno, coached by Hendryk Schamberger. They placed 17th at the 2009 World Junior Championships in Sofia.

During the next two seasons, the two were coached by Roberto Pelizzola and Raffaella Cazzaniga in Milan. They ranked 20th at the 2010 European Championships in Tallinn, Estonia; 19th at the 2010 World Junior Championships in The Hague, Netherlands; 22nd at the 2011 European Championships in Bern, Switzerland; and 5th at the 2011 World Junior Championships in Gangneung, South Korea.

In September 2011, Slovak news reported that their partnership had ended.

=== 2011–2012 season: First season with Testa ===
In October 2011, Slovak news media reported that Csölley had teamed up with Italy's Federica Testa to compete for Slovakia. Coached by Roberto Pelizzola in Milan, Testa/Csölley made their international debut at the Bavarian Open in February 2012 and then competed at the World Championships in March in Nice, France.

=== 2012–2013 season ===
Testa/Csölley finished 17th at the 2013 European Championships in Zagreb, Croatia, having placed 19th in the short dance and 16th in the free dance. At the 2013 World Championships in London, Ontario, Canada, the two placed 26th in the short dance and did not advance further.

=== 2013–2014 season ===
In September 2013, Testa/Csölley competed at the final Olympic qualifying event, the Nebelhorn Trophy; they finished ninth and became the first alternates for the 2014 Winter Olympics. In January 2014, they placed 12th at the European Championships in Budapest, Hungary but the two missed the cut-off for the free dance in March at the World Championships in Saitama, Japan.

=== 2014–2015 season ===
Paola Mezzadri joined Pelizzola as Testa/Csölley's coach. They began their season with a bronze medal at the 2014 Ondrej Nepela Trophy, an ISU Challenger Series (CS) event held in early October. Later that month, making their Grand Prix debut, they placed fourth in the short dance and seventh overall at the 2014 Skate America. In November, they were awarded gold at two CS competitions, the Volvo Open Cup and Warsaw Cup.

They finished eighth overall at the 2015 European Championships in Stockholm, Sweden. In March, they placed 15th at the 2015 World Championships in Shanghai, having ranked 13th in the short and 15th in the free.

=== 2015–2016 season ===
Testa/Csölley finished 9th in the short dance, 8th in the free dance, and 8th overall at the 2016 European Championships in Bratislava. At the 2016 World Championships in Boston, they placed 12th in the short, 15th in the free, and 14th overall.

=== 2016–2017 season: First season with Myslivečková ===
Testa/Csölley received invitations to the 2016 Skate Canada International and 2016 Trophée de France but withdrew from both Grand Prix events on 7 July 2016 due to Testa's decision to retire from competition. After Testa's retirement, Csölley contacted Czech ice dancer Lucie Myslivečková on Skype. They teamed up in late June 2016 and announced on 11 July 2016 that they would compete together for Slovakia. During their first season together, they were coached by Roberto Pelizzola and Paola Mezzadri in Milan, Italy.

Myslivečková/Csölley won gold at the Volvo Open Cup in November 2016 and placed 16th at the 2017 European Championships in Ostrava, Czech Republic. In mid-March 2017, they decided to withdraw from the World Championships in Helsinki due to Myslivečková's shoulder injury, requiring an operation.

=== 2017–2018 season: 2018 Winter Olympics ===
During the season, Myslivečková/Csölley trained under Barbara Fusar-Poli, Stefano Caruso, and Roberto Pelizzolla in Milan, Italy. In late September, the duo competed at the 2017 CS Nebelhorn Trophy, the final qualifying opportunity for the 2018 Winter Olympics. Their result, 6th, was sufficient to obtain an Olympic spot for Slovakia, by 0.27 of a point. In January, they placed 17th at the 2018 European Championships in Moscow, Russia.

In February, the two competed at the 2018 Winter Olympics in Pyeongchang, South Korea. They qualified to the free dance and finished 20th overall. In March, they placed 25th at the 2018 World Championships in Milan, Italy.

Following Myslivečková's decision to retire, Csölley briefly trained with Testa. On June 28, 2018, he announced his retirement from competition.

== Programs ==
=== With Myslivečková ===
Season	Short dance	Free dance
2017–2018	Samba: Tico Tico by Percy Faith; Rhumba: Historia de un Amor by Pérez Prado; Samba: Tico Tico performed by Sambadrom	Cabaret (1972 film) performed by Liza Minnelli; Mein Herr; Maybe This Time; Cabaret
2016–2017	Blues: Cry Me a River by Michael Bublé; Hip hop: End of Time by Beyoncé	Paris by Ibrahim Maalouf; Lilies of the Valley (from Pina) by Jun Miyake; Defie 1962; True Story by Ibrahim Maalouf

=== With Testa ===
Season	Short dance	Free dance	Exhibition
2015–2016	Waltz: Swing Time by Jerome Kern; Slow foxtrot: They Can't Take That Away From Me by George Gershwin performed by Tony Bennett; March: That's Entertainment! by Henry Mancini; The Addams Family; Waltz: A Party for Me?; Foxtrot: Main Theme; Waltz: It's An Addams by Marc Shaiman	Malèna; Passeggiata In Paese by Ennio Morricone; Kutlama by Mr. Avant Garde Folk; Ma l'amore no; Orgia by Ennio Morricone	Addams Family Values by Marc Shaiman; It's An Addams; Fester's In Love; The Big Date; The Tango; Imagine by John Lennon performed by Sam Tsui
2014–2015	Flamenco: Nerva; Paso doble: Zorongo by Paco Pena; Flamenco: Que se ven desde el conquero (Faradangos de Huelva) by Pepe Romero	Enter the Circus by Christina Aguilera; Terrorklowns by Verse 13 (Jamod L. Dodson); Hurt by Christina Aguilera; Song Of Spirit by Karl Jenkins	
2013–2014	Chicago by John Kander and Fred Ebb; Quickstep: Overture; Quickstep: All that Jazz; Slow foxtrot: Funny Honey; Charleston: We Both Reached For the Gun	Addams Family Values by Marc Shaiman; It's An Addams; Fester's In Love; The Big Date; The Tango	
2012–2013	Radetzky March by Johann Strauss I; Die schöne Galathee by Franz von Suppé; Polka by Johann Strauss	Lilli Marleen performed by Marlene Dietrich; Sunflower by Henry Mancini; Place Rouge (from Le Concert) by Camille Adrien; Spellbound by Miklós Rózsa	
2011–2012	Merengue: Pinta Me by Elvis Crespo; Samba: Baila Baila Con Migo by Domino; Rhumba by Gizelle D'Cole	Un Día Llegará by Josh Groban; Spanish Fire by Roberto Pelizzola	

=== With Višňová ===
Season	Short dance	Free dance
2010–2011	Once Upon A December performed by Deana Carter; Tango Concertante by Ralf Gscheidle	Notre-Dame de Paris by Riccardo Cocciante; Les temps des cathedrales; Belle; Les sans-papiers; Danse Mon Esmeralda
	Original dance	
2009–2010	Flamenco	Prelude (On Earth As In Heaven); Wyatt's Torch; Take Me Away by Globus
2008–2009	Charleston: Aviator; The Mooch; Charleston: Aviator	Billie Jean; I Just Can't Stop Loving You; Scream by Michael Jackson
2007–2008	Na Vsetine; Gorale by Čechomor	Volare; A Mi Manera; Volare Radio Mix by Gipsy Kings
2006–2007	Cell Block Tango from Chicago (musical) by John Kander, Fred Ebb; Tango by Jesse Cook; Cell Block Tango from Chicago (musical) by John Kander, Fred Ebb	Volare; A Mi Manera; Volare Radio Mix by Gipsy Kings

== Competitive highlights ==
GP: Grand Prix; CS: Challenger Series; JGP: Junior Grand Prix

=== With Myslivečková ===
International
Event	2016–17	2017–18
Winter Olympics		20th
World Championships	WD	25th
European Championships	16th	17th
CS Lombardia Trophy		7th
CS Nebelhorn Trophy		6th
CS Ondrej Nepela Memorial	8th	
CS Warsaw Cup	3rd	
International Cup of Nice	8th	
Volvo Open Cup	1st	
National
Slovak Championships	1st	1st
Four Nationals	2nd	5th
WD = Withdrew

=== With Testa ===
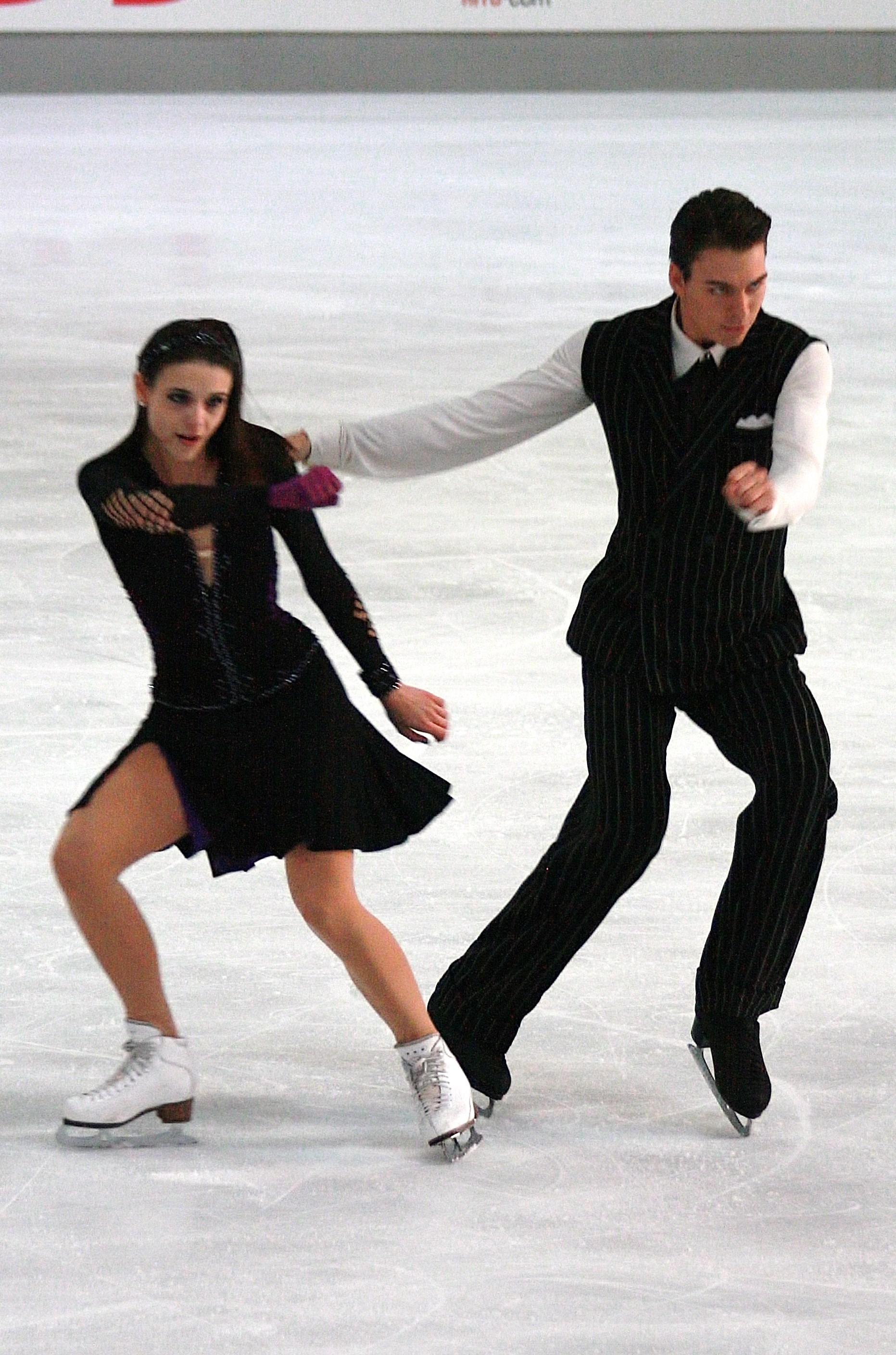
Testa/Csölley at the 2013 Nebelhorn Trophy

International
Event	11–12	12–13	13–14	14–15	15–16	16–17
Worlds	27th	26th	23rd	15th	14th	
Europeans		17th	12th	8th	8th	
GP Cup of China					4th	
GP Skate Canada						WD
GP Skate America				7th		
GP Trophée						WD
CS Nepela Trophy				3rd	4th	
CS Tallinn Trophy					2nd	
CS Volvo Cup				1st		
CS Warsaw Cup				1st		
Bavarian Open	6th					
Crystal Skate		4th				
Golden Spin		8th				
Ice Challenge		9th				
Nebelhorn Trophy			9th			
Nepela Trophy		6th	4th			
New Year's Cup		2nd				
Pavel Roman		5th				
Universiade			4th	3rd		
Volvo Open Cup			4th			
National
Slovak Champ.	1st		1st	1st		
WD = Withdrew

=== With Višňová ===
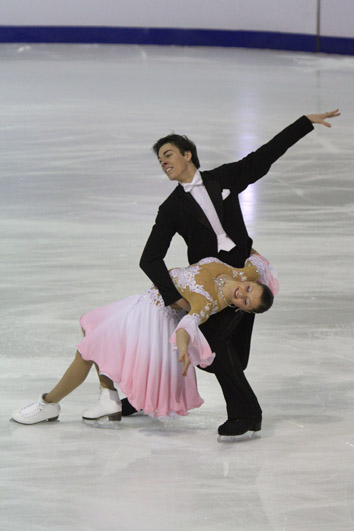
Višňová/Csölley at the 2010 World Junior Championships

International
Event	06–07	07–08	08–09	09–10	10–11
European Champ.				20th	22nd
Golden Spin					9th
Nepela Memorial			6th		
Pavel Roman					2nd
International: Junior
World Junior Champ.	19th	17th	17th	19th	5th
JGP Austria		13th			10th
JGP Czech Republic	14th				7th
JGP France			15th		
JGP Germany		8th		14th	
JGP Hungary	13th				
JGP Turkey				8th	
JGP United Kingdom			11th		
Grand Prize SNP		4th J			
Mont Blanc Trophy					3rd J
Pavel Roman			4th J		
National
Slovak Champ.	1st J	1st J	1st	1st	1st
J = Junior level
