= Maria Monko =

Russian ice dancer

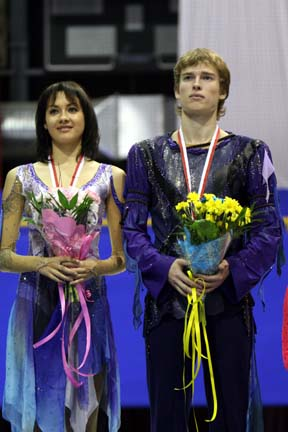
- Monko and Tkachenko at the 2007–08 JGP Final

Personal information
- Full name: Maria Ivanovna Monko
- Born: 26 November 1990 (age 35) Kirov
- Height: 1.73 m (5 ft 8 in)

Figure skating career
- Country: Russia
- Skating club: MDCH
- Retired: 2008
Medal record
Representing Russia
Figure skating: Ice dancing
Junior Grand Prix Final
| Gold medal – first place | 2007–08 Gdańsk | Ice dancing |

Maria Ivanovna Monko (Russian: Мария Ивановна Монько; born 26 November 1990) is a Russian former competitive ice dancer. With Ilia Tkachenko, she is the 2007 ISU Junior Grand Prix Final champion.

== Personal life ==
Maria Monko is the elder sister of Ksenia Monko, who has also competed internationally in ice dancing.

== Career ==
Early in her career, Monko competed with Alexander Bortsov on the national level. She trained mainly in Kirov and then briefly in Rostov-on-Don.

Around late August 2006, Monko began training with Ilia Tkachenko in Odintsovo under Alexei Gorshkov. They won the silver medal at the 2007 Russian Junior Championships and placed fifth at the 2007 World Junior Championships.

In the 2007–08 season, Monko/Tkachenko won a pair of medals on the Junior Grand Prix series and qualified for the JGP Final where they took gold. They finished fourth at the 2008 World Junior Championships after Monko fell on twizzles in both the original and free dance.

For the 2008–09 season, Monko/Tkachenko received two senior Grand Prix assignments, 2008 Skate America and 2008 Trophée Eric Bompard, and prepared new programs. They withdrew, however, from both events. Their partnership ended later in 2008.

== Programs ==
(with Tkachenko)

| Season | Original dance | Free dance | Exhibition |
|---|---|---|---|
| 2007–2008 | I'm Going Out on the Street (Russian: Вдоль по улице) | Song of the Spirit by Karl Jenkins | |
| 2006–2007 | Tango Passion by Astor Piazzolla | Romeo and Juliet (soundtrack) | |

== Competitive highlights ==
=== With Tkachenko ===
Results
International
| Event | 2006–07 | 2007–08 | 2008–09 |
|---|---|---|---|
| GP Skate America | | | WD |
| GP Trophée Bompard | | | WD |
International: Junior
| World Junior Champ. | 5th | 4th | |
| JGP Final | | 1st | |
| JGP Austria | | 2nd | |
| JGP Great Britain | | 1st | |
National
| Russian Junior Champ. | 2nd | 2nd | |
GP = Grand Prix; JGP = Junior Grand Prix

=== With Bortsov ===
| Event | 2003–04 | 2005–06 |
|---|---|---|
| Russian Championships | 9th | 10th |
