= 2006–07 ISU Junior Grand Prix =

- Type: ISU Junior Grand Prix
- Season: 2006–07
- Previous: 2005–06 ISU Junior Grand Prix
- Next: 2007–08 ISU Junior Grand Prix

The 2006–07 ISU Junior Grand Prix was the tenth season of the ISU Junior Grand Prix, a series of international junior level competitions organized by the International Skating Union. It was the Junior-level complement to the 2006–07 ISU Grand Prix of Figure Skating, which was for Senior-level skaters. Skaters compete in the disciplines of men's singles, ladies' singles, pair skating, and ice dance. The top skaters from the series met at the Junior Grand Prix Final.

Skaters who reached the age of 13 by July 1, 2006 but had not turned 19 (singles and females of the other two disciplines) or 21 (male pair skaters and ice dancers) were eligible to compete on the junior circuit.

== Competitions ==
The locations of the JGP events change yearly. In the 2006–07 season, the series was composed of the following events:

| Date | Event | Location | Other notes |
|---|---|---|---|
| August 23–26 | 2006 JGP Courchevel | Courchevel, France | No pair competition |
| Aug. 31 – Sept. 3 | 2006 JGP Budapest | Budapest, Hungary | |
| September 12–17 | 2006 JGP Mexico Cup | Mexico City, Mexico | No pair competition |
| September 21–24 | 2006 JGP Miercurea Ciuc | Miercurea-Ciuc, Romania | No pair competition |
| Sept. 27 – Oct. 1 | 2006 JGP Spin of Norway | Oslo, Norway | |
| October 5–7 | 2006 JGP The Hague | The Hague, Netherlands | No pair competition |
| October 11–14 | 2006 JGP Chinese Taipei Cup | Taipei, Taiwan | |
| October 19–22 | 2006 JGP Liberec | Liberec, Czech Republic | |
| December 7–10 | 2006–07 Junior Grand Prix Final | Sofia, Bulgaria | |

== Junior Grand Prix Final qualifiers ==
The following skaters qualified for the 2006–07 Junior Grand Prix Final, in order of qualification.

| | Men | Ladies | Pairs | Ice dance |
|---|---|---|---|---|
| 1 | (United States) Tommy Steenberg | (United States) Caroline Zhang | (United States) Keauna McLaughlin / Rockne Brubaker | (Russia) Ekaterina Bobrova / Dmitri Soloviev |
| 2 | (United States) Stephen Carriere | (United States) Ashley Wagner | (United States) Kendra Moyle / Andy Seitz | (United States) Emily Samuelson / Evan Bates |
| 3 | (United States) Austin Kanallakan | (United States) Juliana Cannarozzo | (Russia) Ksenia Krasilnikova / Konstantin Bezmaternikh | (United States) Madison Hubbell / Keiffer Hubbell |
| 4 | (United States) Brandon Mroz | (United States) Megan Oster | (United States) Bridget Namiotka / John Coughlin | (Estonia) Grethe Grünberg / Kristian Rand |
| 5 | (Canada) Kevin Reynolds | (Japan) Nana Takeda | (Russia) Vera Bazarova / Yuri Larionov | (Russia) Kristina Gorshkova / Vitali Butikov |
| 6 | (Russia) Artem Borodulin | (Japan) Rumi Suizu | (United States) Kaela Pflumm / Christopher Pottenger | (Russia) Julia Zlobina / Alexei Sitnikov |
| 7 | (Japan) Takahito Mura | (Italy) Stefania Berton | (United States) Jessica Rose Paetsch / Jon Nuss | (Italy) Camilla Spelta / Marco Garavaglia |
| 8 | (United States) Curran Oi | (United States) Melissa Bulanhagui | (Canada) Emilie Demers Boutin / Pierre-Philippe Joncas | (France) Élodie Brouiller / Benoît Richaud |
Alternates
| 1st | (Japan) Tatsuki Machida | (Spain) Sonia Lafuente | (Canada) Amanda Velenosi / Mark Fernandez | (Ukraine) Alisa Agafonova / Dmitri Dun |
| 2nd | (United States) Eliot Halverson | (Russia) Ekaterina Kozireva | (Russia) Lubov Bakirova / Artem Patlasov | (Canada) Kaitlyn Weaver / Andrew Poje |
| 3rd | (Canada) Jeremy Ten | (South Korea) Choi Ji-eun | (Russia) Arina Ushakova / Sergei Karev | (Canada) Joanna Lenko / Mitchell Islam |

Devora Radeva was given the host wildcard spot to the Junior Grand Prix Final.

== Medalists ==
=== Men ===
| Competition | Gold | Silver | Bronze | Details |
|---|---|---|---|---|
| France | (United States) Austin Kanallakan | (United States) Curran Oi | (Canada) Jeremy Ten | |
| Hungary | (United States) Stephen Carriere | (Japan) Takahito Mura | (United States) Eliot Halverson | |
| Mexico | (Canada) Kevin Reynolds | (United States) Brandon Mroz | (United States) Daisuke Murakami | |
| Romania | (United States) Tommy Steenberg | (Russia) Artem Borodulin | (Japan) Hirofumi Torii | |
| Norway | (United States) Austin Kanallakan | (China) Guan Jinlin | (Russia) Vladimir Uspenski | |
| Netherlands | (United States) Stephen Carriere | (Russia) Artem Borodulin | (United States) Eliot Halverson | |
| Chinese Taipei | (United States) Brandon Mroz | (Canada) Kevin Reynolds | (Japan) Takahito Mura | |
| Czech Rep. | (United States) Tommy Steenberg | (Japan) Tatsuki Machida | (Czech Republic) Pavel Kaška | |
| Final | (United States) Stephen Carriere | (United States) Brandon Mroz | (Canada) Kevin Reynolds | |

=== Ladies ===
| Competition | Gold | Silver | Bronze | Details |
|---|---|---|---|---|
| France | (United States) Ashley Wagner | (United States) Megan Hyatt | (Italy) Stefania Berton | |
| Hungary | (United States) Juliana Cannarozzo | (Japan) Rumi Suizu | (South Korea) Choi Ji-eun | |
| Mexico | (United States) Caroline Zhang | (Spain) Sonia Lafuente | (South Korea) Shin Yea-ji | |
| Romania | (Japan) Nana Takeda | (United States) Melissa Bulanhagui | (Russia) Ekaterina Kozireva | |
| Norway | (United States) Juliana Cannarozzo | (Italy) Stefania Berton | (Russia) Margarita Tertichnaia | |
| Netherlands | (United States) Ashley Wagner | (United States) Megan Oster | (Japan) Rumi Suizu | |
| Chinese Taipei | (United States) Caroline Zhang | (Japan) Nana Takeda | (South Korea) Kim Na-young | |
| Czech Rep. | (United States) Megan Oster | (Estonia) Svetlana Issakova | (Estonia) Jelena Glebova | |
| Final | (United States) Caroline Zhang | (United States) Ashley Wagner | (United States) Megan Oster | |

=== Pairs ===
| Competition | Gold | Silver | Bronze | Details |
|---|---|---|---|---|
| France | No pairs competition held | | | |
| Hungary | (United States) Keauna McLaughlin / Rockne Brubaker | (United States) Kaela Pflumm / Christopher Pottenger | (Canada) Emilie Demers Boutin / Pierre-Philippe Joncas | |
| Mexico | No pairs competition held | | | |
| Romania | No pairs competition held | | | |
| Norway | (United States) Kendra Moyle / Andy Seitz | (United States) Bridget Namiotka / John Coughlin | (Canada) Amanda Velenosi / Mark Fernandez | |
| Netherlands | No pairs competition held | | | |
| Chinese Taipei | (United States) Keauna McLaughlin / Rockne Brubaker | (Russia) Vera Bazarova / Yuri Larionov | (United States) Jessica Rose Paetsch / Jon Nuss | |
| Czech Rep. | (Russia) Ksenia Krasilnikova / Konstantin Bezmaternikh | (United States) Kendra Moyle / Andy Seitz | (United States) Bridget Namiotka / John Coughlin | |
| Final | (United States) Keauna McLaughlin / Rockne Brubaker | (Russia) Ksenia Krasilnikova / Konstantin Bezmaternikh | (United States) Jessica Rose Paetsch / Jon Nuss | |

=== Ice dance ===
| Competition | Gold | Silver | Bronze | Details |
|---|---|---|---|---|
| France | (Russia) Ekaterina Bobrova / Dmitri Soloviev | (United States) Madison Hubbell / Keiffer Hubbell | (France) Élodie Brouiller / Benoît Richaud | |
| Hungary | (Russia) Ekaterina Bobrova / Dmitri Soloviev | (Canada) Joanna Lenko / Mitchell Islam | (Russia) Julia Zlobina / Alexei Sitnikov | |
| Mexico | (United States) Emily Samuelson / Evan Bates | (France) Élodie Brouiller / Benoît Richaud | (United States) Piper Gilles / Timothy McKernan | |
| Romania | (Russia) Kristina Gorshkova / Vitali Butikov | (Italy) Camilla Spelta / Marco Garavaglia | (Ukraine) Nadezhda Frolenkova / Mikhail Kasalo | |
| Norway | (Estonia) Grethe Grünberg / Kristian Rand | (Russia) Kristina Gorshkova / Vitali Butikov | (Canada) Vanessa Crone / Paul Poirer | |
| Netherlands | (United States) Madison Hubbell / Keiffer Hubbell | (Estonia) Grethe Grünberg / Kristian Rand | (Russia) Ksenia Antonova / Roman Mylnikov | |
| Chinese Taipei | (United States) Emily Samuelson / Evan Bates | (Ukraine) Alisa Agafonova / Dmitri Dun | (Canada) Kaitlyn Weaver / Andrew Poje | |
| Czech Rep. | (Russia) Julia Zlobina / Alexei Sitnikov | (Italy) Camilla Spelta / Marco Garavaglia | (Canada) Kaitlyn Weaver / Andrew Poje | |
| Final | (United States) Madison Hubbell / Keiffer Hubbell | (United States) Emily Samuelson / Evan Bates | (Russia) Ekaterina Bobrova / Dmitri Soloviev | |

== Medals table ==
| Rank | Nation | Gold | Silver | Bronze | Total |
|---|---|---|---|---|---|
| 1 | United States (USA) | 24 | 12 | 8 | 44 |
| 2 | Russia (RUS) | 5 | 5 | 6 | 16 |
| 3 | Japan (JPN) | 1 | 4 | 3 | 8 |
| 4 | Canada (CAN) | 1 | 2 | 7 | 10 |
| 5 | Estonia (EST) | 1 | 2 | 1 | 4 |
| 6 | Italy (ITA) | 0 | 3 | 1 | 4 |
| 7 | France (FRA) | 0 | 1 | 1 | 2 |
| 7 | Ukraine (UKR) | 0 | 1 | 1 | 2 |
| 9 | China (CHN) | 0 | 1 | 0 | 1 |
| 9 | Spain (ESP) | 0 | 1 | 0 | 1 |
| 11 | South Korea (KOR) | 0 | 0 | 3 | 3 |
| 12 | Czech Republic (CZE) | 0 | 0 | 1 | 1 |
| Totals (12 entries) | | 32 | 32 | 32 | 96 |
