= Konstantin Bezmaternikh =

Russian pair skater

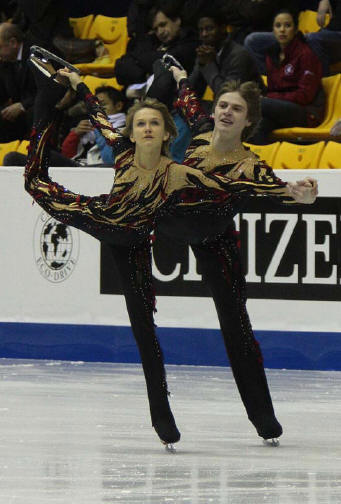
- Krasilnikova and Bezmaternikh in 2008.

Personal information
- Full name: Konstantin Alexeyevich Bezmaternikh
- Born: 22 March 1988 (age 38) Perm, Russian SFSR, Soviet Union
- Height: 1.77 m (5 ft 10 in)

Figure skating career
- Country: Russia
- Partner: Ekaterina Petaikina
- Coach: Artur Dmitriev
- Skating club: Yubileyny
Medal record
Representing Russia
Figure skating: Pairs
World Junior Championships
Gold medal – first place	2008 Sofia	Pairs
Bronze medal – third place	2007 Oberstdorf	Pairs
Bronze medal – third place	2006 Ljubljana	Pairs
Junior Grand Prix Final
Gold medal – first place	2007–08 Gdańsk	Pairs
Silver medal – second place	2006–07 Sofia	Pairs
Bronze medal – third place	2008–09 Goyang City	Pairs

Konstantin Alexeyevich Bezmaternikh (Russian: Константин Алексеевич Безматерных, born 22 March 1988) is a Russian pair skater. With former partner Ksenia Krasilnikova, he is the 2008 World Junior champion.

== Career ==
Bezmaternikh teamed up with Ksenia Krasilnikova in 2003. The pair was coached by Valeri Tiukov and Valentina Tiukova in poor conditions in Perm. Although they placed second on the day, they were later awarded the 2007-08 Junior Grand Prix Final title following the retroactive disqualification of Vera Bazarova / Yuri Larionov due to a positive doping sample from Larionov.

Krasilnikova/Bezmaternikh withdrew from the 2009 Nebelhorn Trophy after the short program – he injured ligaments in his right hand. Krasilnikova decided to retire from competitive skating after the 2009–10 season due to a persistent back injury.

Bezmaternikh moved to Saint Petersburg and began training in Tamara Moskvina and Artur Dmitriev's group. In 2010, he teamed up with Sabina Imaikina and finished 10th at the 2011 Russian Nationals. In February 2011, they announced their split. Moskvina paired him with Oksana Nagalaty later that month. Nagalaty and Bezmaternikh parted ways at the end of the 2011–12 season. He then skated with Ekaterina Petaikina for one season.

== Programs ==
=== With Nagalaty ===
Season	Short program	Free skating
2011–2012	Palladio by Karl Jenkins	

=== With Krasilnikova ===
Season	Short program	Free skating	Exhibition
2009–2010	The Blizzard by Georgy Sviridov	Pirates of the Caribbean by Klaus Badelt, Hans Zimmer	
2008–2009	Valpurgis Night (from the opera Margarethe) by Charles Gounod	Pirates of the Caribbean by Klaus Badelt, Hans Zimmer	Color of the Night by Dominic Frontiere
2007–2008	Quidam (from Cirque du Soleil)	Spartacus by Aram Khachaturian	
2006–2007	The Circus Princess by Emmerich Kálmán	Spartacus by Aram Khachaturian	
2005–2006	The Circus Princess by Emmerich Kálmán	Don Quixote by Ludwig Minkus	
2004–2005	The Music of the West	Don Quixote by Ludwig Minkus	

== Competitive highlights ==
=== With Petaikina ===
Event	2012–13
Russian Championships	11th

=== With Nagalatiy ===
Event	2011–12
Russian Championships	11th

=== With Imaikina ===
International
Event	2010–11
Winter Universiade	4th
National
Russian Championships	10th

=== With Krasilnikova ===
International
Event	2004–05	2005–06	2006–07	2007–08	2008–09	2009–10
GP Cup of Russia				5th		
GP NHK Trophy						6th
Nebelhorn						WD
Universiade					6th	
International: Junior
Junior Worlds		3rd	3rd	1st		
JGP Final			2nd	1st	3rd	
JGP Belarus					4th	
JGP Croatia		2nd				
JGP Czech Rep.			1st			
JGP France	4th					
JGP Germany				3rd		
JGP Japan		2nd				
JGP Mexico					1st	
JGP Serbia	6th					
JGP Taipei			4th			
JGP U.K.				2nd		
National
Russian Champ.	8th	9th		5th	4th	WD
Russian Junior		2nd	1st	1st		
GP = Grand Prix; JGP = Junior Grand Prix; J. = Junior level; WD = Withdrew
