= Dimitri Kahirau =

Belarusian figure skater

Personal information
- Born: 10 October 1992 (age 34)
- Height: 172 cm (5 ft 8 in)

Figure skating career
- Country: Belarus
- Coach: Halina Aliaksandrava
- Skating club: Sport Club Minsk

Dimitri Kahirau (born 10 October 1992 in Potsdam, Germany) is a Belarusian figure skater. He is the 2007 Belarusian national bronze medalist. He placed 37th at the 2007 World Junior Figure Skating Championships. He is a two-season competitor on the Junior Grand Prix.
