= Kristina Gorshkova =

Russian ice dancer

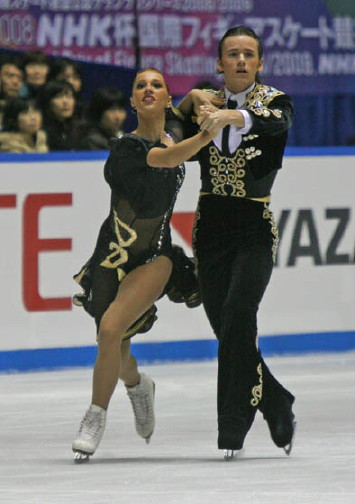
- Gorshkova and Butikov at the 2008 NHK Trophy

Personal information
- Full name: Kristina Valeryevna Gorshkova
- Born: 18 February 1989 (age 37) Moscow, Russian SFSR, Soviet Union
- Height: 1.64 m (5 ft 5 in)

Figure skating career
- Country: Russia
- Partner: Vitali Butikov
- Coach: Elena Tchaikovskaia; Ksenia Rumiantseva
- Skating club: Vorobievye Gory
- Began skating: 1993
Medal record
Representing Russia
Figure skating: Ice dancing
Winter Universiade
Gold medal – first place	2011 Erzurum	Ice dancing
World Junior Championships
Bronze medal – third place	2008 Sofia	Ice dancing
Junior Grand Prix Final
Bronze medal – third place	2007–08 Gdańsk	Ice dancing

Kristina Valeryevna Gorshkova (Russian: Кристина Валерьевна Горшкова, born 18 February 1989) is a Russian former competitive ice dancer. With partner Vitali Butikov, she is the 2008 World Junior bronze medalist.

Gorshkova began skating at age four and switched from singles to ice dancing at age ten. After their coach, Tatiana Kuzmina, was killed in a car accident in July 2007, Gorshkova and Butikov began working with Elena Tchaikovskaia, Ksenia Rumiantseva, and Petr Durnev.

Gorshkova is studying Cultural and Social Anthropology at the University of Latvia.

== Programs ==
(with Butikov)

Season	Original dance	Free dance
2009–2010	Russian Waltz	Phantom on Ice by Robert Danova
2008–2009	Too Many Tears by Harry Warren; Bei Mir Bistu Shein	The Godfather by Nino Rota
2007–2008	Greek folk dance	Total Eclipse of the Heart by Bonnie Tyler
2006–2007	La cumparsita Gerardo Matos Rodríguez	Eine kleine Nachtmusik by Wolfgang Mozart

== Competitive highlights ==
(with Butikov)

Results
International
Event	2004–05	2005–06	2006–07	2007–08	2008–09	2009–10	2010–11	2011–12	2012–13
GP Bompard						7th		7th	
GP NHK Trophy					5th				
GP Rostelecom							4th		
GP Skate America						7th			
GP Skate Canada					4th		6th		
Finlandia					3rd		3rd	5th	
Golden Spin					2nd		2nd		
NRW Trophy									4th
Universiade					4th		1st		
International: Junior
Junior Worlds			4th	3rd					
JGP Final			4th	3rd					
JGP Croatia		3rd		2nd					
JGP Germany				1st					
JGP Norway			2nd						
JGP Romania			1st						
JGP Slovakia		5th							
JGP USA	5th								
National
Russian Champ.					3rd	6th	5th	7th	
Russian Junior			3rd	1st					
GP = Grand Prix; JGP = Junior Grand Prix
