= Lucie Myslivečková =

Czech and Slovak former competitive ice dancer

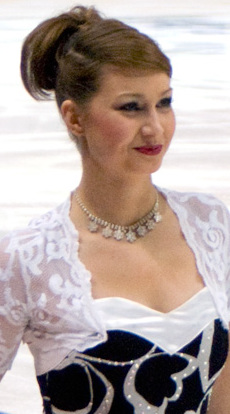
- Myslivečková in 2010

Personal information
- Born: 8 December 1989 (age 36) Čeladná, Czechoslovakia
- Home town: Břeclav
- Height: 1.64 m (5 ft 5 in)

Figure skating career
- Country: Slovakia (2016–2018); Czech Republic (until 2014)
- Discipline: Ice dance
- Partner: Lukáš Csölley, Matěj Novák, Neil Brown
- Began skating: 1993
- Retired: 23 April 2018

Medal record
Representing Slovakia
Slovak Championships
Gold medal – first place	2017 Katowice	Ice dance
Gold medal – first place	2018 Košice	Ice dance
Representing Czech Republic
Czech Championships
Gold medal – first place	2011 Žilina	Ice dance
Gold medal – first place	2013 Cieszyn	Ice dance
Gold medal – first place	2014 Bratislava	Ice dance
Silver medal – second place	2008 Trenčín	Ice dance
Silver medal – second place	2012 Ostrava	Ice dance

Lucie Myslivečková (born 8 December 1989) is a Czech and Slovak former competitive ice dancer. Representing Slovakia with Lukáš Csölley, she competed at the 2018 Winter Olympics in Pyeongchang, South Korea. Earlier in her career, she represented the Czech Republic with Matěj Novák and Neil Brown. With Novák, she is the 2010 Golden Spin of Zagreb champion and the 2011 Czech national champion.

== Personal life ==
Myslivečková was born on 8 December 1989 in Čeladná. She became a Slovak citizen in December 2017.

== Career ==
Myslivečková started learning to skate in 1994.

=== With Novák ===
Myslivečková teamed up with Matěj Novák in 2005. At the end of September, they began representing the Czech Republic on the ISU Junior Grand Prix (JGP) circuit. The two made their senior international debut in September 2007 at the Nebelhorn Trophy before winning the silver medal at the 2007 JGP in Sheffield, England. In November, they took the senior bronze medal at the Pavel Roman Memorial.

Myslivečková/Novák were awarded the bronze medal at the 2008 JGP in Courchevel, France. In February 2009, they competed in Sofia, Bulgaria, at their fourth consecutive World Junior Championships, finishing 8th. A month later, they appeared at their first senior ISU Championship, placing 21st at the 2009 World Championships in Los Angeles.

Myslivečková/Novák made their senior Grand Prix debut the following season, finishing 7th at the 2009 Cup of Russia and 9th at the 2009 NHK Trophy. They missed part of the season due to her broken elbow. The two ranked 16th at the 2010 World Championships in Turin, Italy.

During the 2010–11 season, they won silver at the Ondrej Nepela Memorial, finished 6th at the NHK Trophy and 5th at the Cup of Russia. They won their first international title at the 2010 Golden Spin of Zagreb. At the end of the season, Novák decided to leave competitive skating.

=== Later partnerships ===
Myslivečková teamed up with French ice dancer Neil Brown in the summer of 2011. Representing the Czech Republic, the two won the bronze medal at the 2012 Bavarian Open, silver at the 2012 Ice Challenge, and bronze at the 2013 International Trophy of Lyon, in addition to two national titles.

Myslivečková/Brown competed at three European Championships, achieving their highest placement, 14th, at the 2013 Europeans in Zagreb, Croatia. Ranked 21st in the short dance, they just missed qualifying for the final segment at the 2013 World Championships in London, Ontario, Canada. Their final competition together was the Bavarian Open in February 2014.

Myslivečková briefly partnered with Czech single skater Pavel Kaška but they did not compete internationally. After undergoing surgery for a ligament tear in her knee, followed by six months of rest, she became a coach in Norway.

=== 2016–2017 season: First season with Csölley ===
Slovakia's Lukáš Csölley contacted Myslivečková on Skype after his previous partner ended her career. They teamed up in late June 2016 and announced on 11 July 2016 that they would compete together for Slovakia. During their first season together, they were coached by Roberto Pelizzola and Paola Mezzadri in Milan, Italy.

Myslivečková/Csölley won gold at the Volvo Open Cup in November 2016 and placed 16th at the 2017 European Championships in Ostrava, Czech Republic. In mid-March 2017, they decided to withdraw from the World Championships in Helsinki due to Myslivečková's shoulder injury, requiring an operation.

=== 2017–2018 season: 2018 Winter Olympics ===
During the season, Myslivečková/Csölley trained under Barbara Fusar-Poli, Stefano Caruso, and Roberto Pelizzolla in Milan, Italy. In late September, the duo competed at the 2017 CS Nebelhorn Trophy, the final qualifying opportunity for the 2018 Winter Olympics. Their result, 6th, was sufficient to obtain an Olympic spot for Slovakia, by 0.27 of a point. In January, they placed 17th at the 2018 European Championships in Moscow, Russia.

In February, the two competed at the 2018 Winter Olympics in Pyeongchang, South Korea. They qualified to the free dance and finished 20th overall. In March, they placed 25th at the 2018 World Championships in Milan, Italy.

== Programs ==
=== With Csölley ===
Season	Short dance	Free dance
2017–2018	Samba: Tico Tico by Percy Faith; Rhumba: Historia de un Amor by Pérez Prado; Samba: Tico Tico performed by Sambadrom	Cabaret (1972 film) performed by Liza Minnelli; Mein Herr; Maybe This Time; Cabaret
2016–2017	Blues: Cry Me a River by Michael Bublé; Hip hop: End of Time by Beyoncé	Paris by Ibrahim Maalouf; Lilies of the Valley (from Pina) by Jun Miyake; Defie 1962; True Story by Ibrahim Maalouf

=== With Brown ===
Season	Short dance	Free dance
2013–2014	Foxtrot: Hit by Brick by The Atomic Fireballs; Quickstep: Boyfriend (remix) by Antoine Delvig vs. Lou Bega	Mambo Italiano; Manfred's Mambo by El tattoo del tigre; Mambo No. 8 by Perez Prado
2012–2013	Polka: Charlie Chaplin (soundtrack); Waltz: The Artist by Ludovic Bource; March: The Kid by Charlie Chaplin	Pendulum; Challenger by Skrillex; Scary Monsters and Nice Sprinters by Cutting Edge Sound Design; Scary Monsters and Nice Sprinters remix
2011–2012	Whatever Happens by Michael Jackson; Mambo, Mambo by Lou Bega	Tough Lover by Christina Aguilera; Feeling Good by Michael Bublé; Show Me How You Burlesque by Christina Aguilera

=== With Novák ===
Season	Short dance	Free dance
2010–2011	Waltz: Battagliero; Quickstep by Alexander's Rag Time Band	Let My People Go; Money; Jessica Rabbit; Venus
	Original dance	
2009–2010	Finnish polka	Blues for Klook by Eddy Louiss
2008–2009	Blues: Harlem Nocturne; Quickstep: Let Yourself Go	Endgame (from Chess (musical)) by Björn Ulvaeus
2007–2008	Finnish dance: Lehty; Leva's Polka by Loituma	La Notte Eterna by Emma Shapplin
2006–2007	Tango Taemstvi by Daniel Landa; Cellblock Tango (from Chicago musical)	Once Upon a Time in Mexico by Maxime Rodriguez; Wild Time
2005–2006	Cha Cha: Banga, Banga by Buena Vista Social Club; Rhumba: Mi Thierra by Edwin Bonilla; Samba: Vive, Vive! by Puerto Rican Power	Whenever, Whenever by Shakira; Sing for the Moment; Objection by Shakira

== Competitive highlights ==
GP: Grand Prix; CS: Challenger Series; JGP: Junior Grand Prix

=== With Csölley for Slovakia ===
International
Event	2016–17	2017–18
Winter Olympics		20th
World Championships	WD	25th
European Championships	16th	17th
CS Lombardia Trophy		7th
CS Nebelhorn Trophy		6th
CS Ondrej Nepela Memorial	8th	
CS Warsaw Cup	3rd	
International Cup of Nice	8th	
Volvo Open Cup	1st	
National
Slovak Championships	1st	1st
Four Nationals	2nd	5th

=== With Brown for the Czech Republic ===
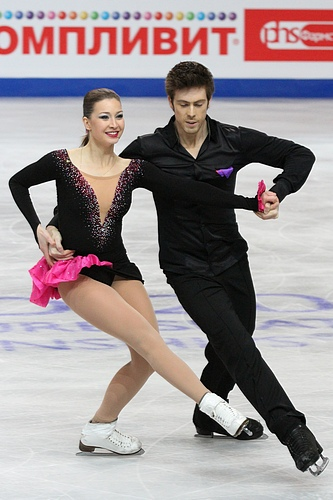
Myslivečkova and Brown at the 2012 European Championships

International
Event	2011–12	2012–13	2013–14
World Champ.		21st	
European Champ.	19th	14th	26th
Bavarian Open	3rd		
Cup of Nice		5th	10th
Golden Spin	10th		10th
Ice Challenge		2nd	
Nebelhorn Trophy		10th	
Nepela Memorial		5th	10th
Pavel Roman Memorial		6th	
Trophy of Lyon	4th	3rd	
National
Czech Champ.	2nd	1st	1st

=== With Novák for the Czech Republic ===
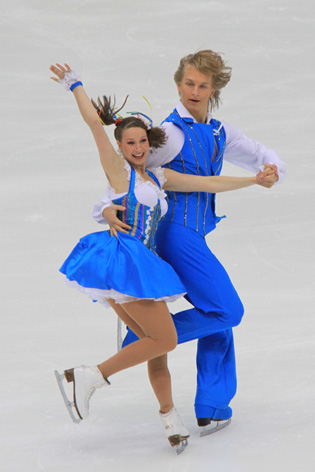
Myslivečkova and Novák at the 2009 NHK Trophy

International
Event	05–06	06–07	07–08	08–09	09–10	10–11
Worlds				21st	16th	22nd
Europeans						10th
GP Cup of Russia					7th	5th
GP NHK Trophy					9th	6th
Golden Spin						1st
Nebelhorn Trophy			11th		6th	7th
Nepela Memorial						2nd
Pavel Roman			3rd			
Schäfer Memorial				4th		
International: Junior
Junior Worlds	19th	18th	12th	8th		
JGP Bulgaria	15th					
JGP Czech Rep.				4th		
JGP Estonia			4th			
JGP France				3rd		
JGP U.K.			2nd			
Pavel Roman	5th					
National
Czech Champ.			2nd	2nd		1st
Czech Junior Champ.	1st	1st	1st			
