= Ksenia Krasilnikova =

Russian pair skater (born 1991)

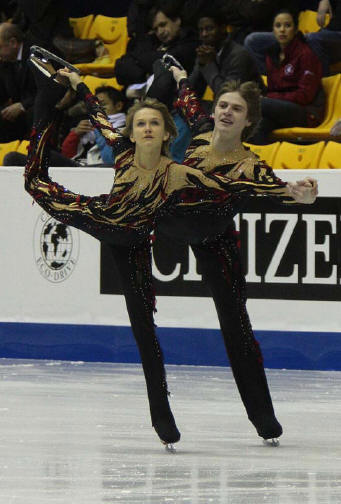
- Krasilnikova/Bezmaternikh in 2008.

Personal information
- Full name: Ksenia Vasilyevna Krasilnikova
- Born: 18 June 1991 (age 35) Krasnoyarsk
- Height: 1.52 m (5 ft 0 in)

Figure skating career
- Country: Russia
- Skating club: Orlenok Perm
- Began skating: 1996
- Retired: 2010
Medal record
Representing Russia
Figure skating: Pairs
World Junior Championships
| Gold medal – first place | 2008 Sofia | Pairs |
| Bronze medal – third place | 2007 Oberstdorf | Pairs |
| Bronze medal – third place | 2006 Ljubljana | Pairs |
Junior Grand Prix Final
| Gold medal – first place | 2007–08 Gdańsk | Pairs |
| Silver medal – second place | 2006–07 Sofia | Pairs |
| Bronze medal – third place | 2008–09 Goyang City | Pairs |

Ksenia Vasilyevna Krasilnikova (Russian: Ксения Васильевна Красильникова, born 18 June 1991) is a Russian former pair skater. With Konstantin Bezmaternikh, she is the 2008 World Junior champion.

== Career ==
Krasilnikova teamed up with Konstantin Bezmaternikh in 2003. The pair was coached by Valeri Tiukov and Valentina Tiukova in poor conditions in Perm. Although they placed second on the day, they were later awarded the 2007-2008 Junior Grand Prix Final title following the retroactive disqualification of Vera Bazarova / Yuri Larionov due to a positive doping sample from Larionov.

Krasilnikova / Bezmaternikh withdrew from the 2009 Nebelhorn Trophy after the short program – he injured ligaments in his right hand. Krasilnikova decided to retire from competitive skating after the 2009–2010 season due to a persistent back injury.

== Programs ==
(with Bezmaternikh)

| Season | Short program | Free skating | Exhibition |
|---|---|---|---|
| 2009–2010 | The Blizzard by Georgy Sviridov | Pirates of the Caribbean by Klaus Badelt, Hans Zimmer | |
| 2008–2009 | Valpurgis Night (from the opera Margarethe) by Charles Gounod | Pirates of the Caribbean by Klaus Badelt, Hans Zimmer | Color of the Night by Dominic Frontiere |
| 2007–2008 | Quidam (from Cirque du Soleil) | Spartacus by Aram Khachaturian | |
| 2006–2007 | The Circus Princess by Emmerich Kálmán | Spartacus by Aram Khachaturian | |
| 2005–2006 | The Circus Princess by Emmerich Kálmán | Don Quixote by Ludwig Minkus | |
| 2004–2005 | The Music of the West | Don Quixote by Ludwig Minkus | |

== Competitive highlights ==
(with Bezmaternikh)

Results
International
| Event | 2004–05 | 2005–06 | 2006–07 | 2007–08 | 2008–09 | 2009–10 |
|---|---|---|---|---|---|---|
| GP Cup of Russia | | | | 5th | | |
| GP NHK Trophy | | | | | | 6th |
| Nebelhorn | | | | | | WD |
| Universiade | | | | | 6th | |
International: Junior
| Junior Worlds | | 3rd | 3rd | 1st | | |
| JGP Final | | | 2nd | 1st | 3rd | |
| JGP Belarus | | | | | 4th | |
| JGP Croatia | | 2nd | | | | |
| JGP Czech | | | 1st | | | |
| JGP Germany | | | | 3rd | | |
| JGP Gr. Britain | | | | 2nd | | |
| JGP Japan | | 2nd | | | | |
| JGP France | 4th | | | | | |
| JGP Mexico | | | | | 1st | |
| JGP Serbia | 6th | | | | | |
| JGP Taipei | | | 4th | | | |
National
| Russian Champ. | 8th | 9th | | 5th | 4th | WD |
| Russian Junior | | 2nd | 1st | 1st | | |
GP = Grand Prix; JGP = Junior Grand Prix; J. = Junior level; WD = Withdrew
