= 2008–09 ISU Junior Grand Prix =

Figure skating competition

- Type: ISU Junior Grand Prix
- Date: August 27 – December 14, 2008
- Season: 2008–09
- Location: (France) Courchevel (Italy) Merano; Mexico City (Czech Republic) Ostrava (Spain) Madrid (Belarus) Gomel (South Africa) Cape Town (United Kingdom) Sheffield (South Korea) Goyang
- Previous: 2007–08 ISU Junior Grand Prix
- Next: 2009–10 ISU Junior Grand Prix

The 2008–09 ISU Junior Grand Prix was the 12th season of the ISU Junior Grand Prix, a series of international junior level competitions organized by the International Skating Union. It was the Junior-level complement to the 2008–09 ISU Grand Prix of Figure Skating, which was for Senior-level skaters. Skaters competed in the disciplines of men's singles, ladies' singles, pair skating, and ice dance.

Skaters earned points towards qualification at each of the eight Junior Grand Prix events. The top eight skaters/teams in the series from each discipline met at the Junior Grand Prix Final. For the first time, the Junior Grand Prix Final was held concurrently with the senior Grand Prix Final.

== Competitions ==
The locations of the JGP events change yearly. In the 2008–09 season, the series was composed of the following events:

Date	Event	Location	Other notes
August 27–31	2008 JGP Courchevel	Courchevel, France	No pair competition
September 3–7	2008 JGP Merano	Merano, Italy	No pair competition
September 10–14	2008 JGP Mexico Cup	Mexico City, Mexico	
September 17–21	2008 JGP Czech Skate	Ostrava, Czech Republic	
September 24–28	2008 JGP Madrid Cup	Madrid, Spain	No pair competition
October 1–5	2008 JGP Golden Lynx	Gomel, Belarus	
October 8–12	2008 JGP Skate Safari	Cape Town, South Africa	No pair competition
October 15–18	2008 JGP John Curry Memorial	Sheffield, United Kingdom	
December 10–14	2008–09 Junior Grand Prix Final	Goyang, South Korea	

For the first time, the Junior Grand Prix Final was held in conjunction with the Grand Prix Final.

== Qualifying ==
Skaters who reached the age of 13 by July 1, 2008 but had not turned 19 (singles and females of the other two disciplines) or 21 (male pair skaters and ice dancers) were eligible to compete on the junior circuit. Unlike the senior ISU Grand Prix of Figure Skating, skaters for the Junior Grand Prix are entered by their national federations rather than seeded by the ISU. The number of entries allotted to each ISU member federation is determined by their skaters' placements at the previous season's World Junior Figure Skating Championships in each respective discipline.

For the 2008–09 season, in singles, the five best placed member nations at the 2008 World Junior Figure Skating Championships were allowed to enter two skaters in all eight events. Member nations who placed sixth through tenth were allowed to enter one skater in all eight events. Member nations with a skater who had qualified for the free skate at Junior Worlds were allowed to enter one skater in seven of the events. Member nations who did not qualify for the free skate but placed 25th through 30th in the short program were allowed to enter one skater in six of the events. All other nations were allowed to enter one skater in five of the events. There were provisions for additional entries per member country if another country did not use all of its allotted entries.

In pairs, member nations were allowed to enter up to three teams per event. The host nation was allowed to enter as many pair teams as it wanted. Pairs was contested at four events out of eight.

In ice dance, member nations were allowed to enter one dance team per event. Member nations who placed in the top five at the 2008 World Junior Championships were allowed to enter a second dance team.

The host country was allowed to enter up to three skaters/teams in singles and dance in their event, and there was no limit to the number of pairs teams.

The general spots allowance for the 2008–09 Junior Grand Prix events was as follows:

Entries	Men	Ladies	Ice dance
2 per event	United States; Russia; China; Czech Republic; Canada	United States; Finland; Japan; Russia; Sweden	United States; Canada; Russia; Ukraine; Italy
1 per event	France; Switzerland; Spain; Ukraine; Kazakhstan	Germany; Canada; Estonia; Spain; Italy	
1 in seven events	Japan; Sweden; Germany; Slovakia; Poland	South Korea; Slovakia; Ukraine; Austria; China; New Zealand; Australia; Hungary	
1 in six events	Estonia; Austria; Norway; Finland; Israel; Italy	Czech Republic; Azerbaijan; Chinese Taipei; Denmark	

All other member nations had one entry per discipline in five of the eight events in singles, and one entry in all eight events for ice dance.

== Junior Grand Prix Final qualifiers ==
The following skaters qualified for the 2008–2009 Junior Grand Prix Final, in order of qualification.

	Men	Ladies	Pairs	Ice dance
1	(United States) Richard Dornbush	(United States) Kristine Musademba	(Russia) Lubov Iliushechkina / Nodari Maisuradze	(United States) Madison Hubbell / Keiffer Hubbell
2	(Czech Republic) Michal Březina	(Japan) Yukiko Fujisawa	(Russia) Anastasia Martiusheva / Alexei Rogonov	(United States) Madison Chock / Greg Zuerlein
3	(United States) Armin Mahbanoozadeh	(United States) Alexe Gilles	(Russia) Sabina Imaikina / Andrei Novoselov	(United States) Maia Shibutani / Alex Shibutani
4	(United States) Alexander Johnson	(Japan) Kanako Murakami	(Russia) Ksenia Krasilnikova / Konstantin Bezmaternikh	(Russia) Ekaterina Riazanova / Jonathan Guerreiro
5	(France) Florent Amodio	(United States) Amanda Dobbs	(Russia) Ksenia Ozerova / Alexander Enbert	(United States) Piper Gilles / Zachary Donohue
6	(Russia) Ivan Bariev	(United States) Becky Bereswill	(Japan) Narumi Takahashi / Mervin Tran	(Ukraine) Alisa Agafonova / Dmitri Dun
7	(Kazakhstan) Denis Ten	(United States) Angela Maxwell	(China) Zhang Yue / Wang Lei	(Canada) Kharis Ralph / Asher Hill
8	(Canada) Elladj Baldé	(Canada) Diane Szmiett	(United States) Marissa Castelli / Simon Shnapir	(Russia) Ekaterina Pushkash / Dmitri Kiselev
Alternates
1st	(Russia) Artur Gachinski	(Italy) Stefania Berton	(Russia) Ekaterina Sheremetieva / Mikhail Kuznetsov	(Russia) Marina Antipova / Artem Kudashev
2nd	(United States) Keegan Messing	(Germany) Sarah Hecken	(Canada) Paige Lawrence / Rudi Swiegers	(Canada) Karen Routhier / Eric Saucke-Lacelle
3rd	(China) Cheng Gongming	(Japan) Shoko Ishikawa	(Switzerland) Anaïs Morand / Antoine Dorsaz	(Czech Republic) Lucie Myslivečková / Matěj Novák

- Michal Březina, the second qualifier in the men's event, withdrew on December 1. Artur Gachinski, the first alternate, replaced him.
- Piper Gilles / Zachary Donohue, the fifth qualifiers in the ice dance event, withdrew due to an injury to Gilles. Marina Antipova / Artem Kudashev, the first alternates, replace them.
- Ekaterina Sheremetieva / Mikhail Kuznetsov, the first alternates in the pairs event, withdrew on December 1.

== Medalists ==
=== Men ===
Competition	Gold	Silver	Bronze	Details
France	(Czech Republic) Michal Březina	(United States) Armin Mahbanoozadeh	(France) Florent Amodio	
Italy	(Czech Republic) Michal Březina	(United States) Curran Oi	(Russia) Alexander Nikolaev	
Mexico	(United States) Richard Dornbush	(Canada) Elladj Baldé	(China) Cheng Gongming	
Czech Rep.	(United States) Alexander Johnson	(Russia) Ivan Bariev	(Japan) Akio Sasaki	
Spain	(United States) Armin Mahbanoozadeh	(Russia) Artur Gachinski	(Japan) Tatsuki Machida	
Belarus	(Kazakhstan) Denis Ten	(China) Yang Chao	(China) Cheng Gongming	
South Africa	(United States) Richard Dornbush	(Russia) Ivan Bariev	(Canada) Elladj Baldé	
United Kingdom	(France) Florent Amodio	(United States) Keegan Messing	(United States) Alexander Johnson	
Final	(France) Florent Amodio	(United States) Armin Mahbanoozadeh	(United States) Richard Dornbush	

=== Ladies ===
Competition	Gold	Silver	Bronze	Details
France	(United States) Kristine Musademba	(United States) Becky Bereswill	(Canada) Diane Szmiett	
Italy	(United States) Melissa Bulanhagui	(Japan) Rumi Suizu	(Germany) Sarah Hecken	
Mexico	(United States) Amanda Dobbs	(United States) Alexe Gilles	(South Korea) Kwak Min-jeong	
Czech Rep.	(Japan) Yukiko Fujisawa	(United States) Angela Maxwell	(Italy) Stefania Berton	
Spain	(United States) Kristine Musademba	(United States) Becky Bereswill	(Japan) Kanako Murakami	
Belarus	(Japan) Haruka Imai	(Russia) Oksana Gozeva	(Japan) Kana Muramoto	
South Africa	(United States) Alexe Gilles	(Canada) Diane Szmiett	(United States) Amanda Dobbs	
United Kingdom	(Japan) Kanako Murakami	(Japan) Yukiko Fujisawa	(United States) Angela Maxwell	
Final	(United States) Becky Bereswill	(Japan) Yukiko Fujisawa	(United States) Alexe Gilles	

=== Pairs ===
Competition	Gold	Silver	Bronze	Details
France	No pairs competition held			
Italy	No pairs competition held			
Mexico	(Russia) Ksenia Krasilnikova / Konstantin Bezmaternikh	(Russia) Ekaterina Sheremetieva / Mikhail Kuznetsov	(Russia) Anastasia Martiusheva / Alexei Rogonov	
Czech Rep.	(Russia) Lubov Iliushechkina / Nodari Maisuradze	(Russia) Sabina Imaikina / Andrei Novoselov	(Russia) Ksenia Ozerova / Alexander Enbert	
Spain	No pairs competition held			
Belarus	(Russia) Lubov Iliushechkina / Nodari Maisuradze	(Russia) Ksenia Ozerova / Alexander Enbert	(China) Zhang Yue / Wang Lei	
South Africa	No pairs competition held			
United Kingdom	(Russia) Anastasia Martiusheva / Alexei Rogonov	(Russia) Sabina Imaikina / Andrei Novoselov	(Japan) Narumi Takahashi / Mervin Tran	
Final	(Russia) Lubov Iliushechkina / Nodari Maisuradze	(China) Zhang Yue / Wang Lei	(Russia) Ksenia Krasilnikova / Konstantin Bezmaternikh	

=== Ice dance ===
Competition	Gold	Silver	Bronze	Details
France	(United States) Maia Shibutani / Alex Shibutani	(Canada) Kharis Ralph / Asher Hill	(Czech Republic) Lucie Myslivečková / Matěj Novák	
Italy	(United States) Madison Chock / Greg Zuerlein	(Russia) Ekaterina Riazanova / Jonathan Guerreiro	(Italy) Lorenza Alessandrini / Simone Vaturi	
Mexico	(United States) Madison Hubbell / Keiffer Hubbell	(Canada) Kharis Ralph / Asher Hill	(Russia) Valeria Zenkova / Valerie Sinitsin	
Czech Rep.	(United States) Piper Gilles / Zachary Donohue	(Russia) Marina Antipova / Artem Kudashev	(Canada) Karen Routhier / Eric Saucke-Lacelle	
Spain	(Russia) Ekaterina Riazanova / Jonathan Guerreiro	(United States) Maia Shibutani / Alex Shibutani	(Ukraine) Anastasia Vykhodtseva / Alexei Shumski	
Belarus	(Ukraine) Alisa Agafonova / Dmitri Dun	(Russia) Ekaterina Pushkash / Dmitri Kiselev	(France) Terra Findlay / Benoît Richaud	
South Africa	(United States) Madison Hubbell / Keiffer Hubbell	(United States) Piper Gilles / Zachary Donohue	(Russia) Ksenia Monko / Kirill Khaliavin	
United Kingdom	(United States) Madison Chock / Greg Zuerlein	(Ukraine) Alisa Agafonova / Dmitri Dun	(Canada) Karen Routhier / Eric Saucke-Lacelle	
Final	(United States) Madison Chock / Greg Zuerlein	(United States) Madison Hubbell / Keiffer Hubbell	(Russia) Ekaterina Riazanova / Jonathan Guerreiro	

== Medals table ==
The following is the table of total medals earned by each country on the 2008–2009 Junior Grand Prix. It can be sorted by country name, number of gold medals, number of silver medals, number of bronze medals, and total medals overall.

Rank	Nation	Gold	Silver	Bronze	Total
1	United States (USA)	17	11	5	33
2	Russia (RUS)	6	11	7	24
3	Japan (JPN)	3	3	5	11
4	France (FRA)	2	0	2	4
5	Czech Republic (CZE)	2	0	1	3
6	Ukraine (UKR)	1	1	1	3
7	Kazakhstan (KAZ)	1	0	0	1
8	Canada (CAN)	0	4	4	8
9	China (CHN)	0	2	3	5
10	Italy (ITA)	0	0	2	2
11	Germany (GER)	0	0	1	1
11	South Korea (KOR)	0	0	1	1
Totals (12 entries)		32	32	32	96
