= 2008–09 Grand Prix of Figure Skating Final =

2008–09 Grand Prix Final
- Type: Grand Prix
- Date: December 10 – 14, 2008
- Season: 2008–09
- Location: Goyang, South Korea
- Venue: Seongsa Ice Rink

Champions
- Men's singles: (United States) Jeremy Abbott (S) (France) Florent Amodio (J)
- Ladies' singles: (Japan) Mao Asada (S) (United States) Becky Bereswill (J)
- Pairs: (China) Pang Qing / Tong Jian (S) (Russia) Lubov Iliushechkina / Nodari Maisuradze (J)
- Ice dance: (France) Isabelle Delobel / Olivier Schoenfelder (S) (United States) Madison Chock / Greg Zuerlein (J)
- Previous: 2007–08 Grand Prix Final
- Next: 2009–10 Grand Prix Final
- Previous Grand Prix: 2008 NHK Trophy

The 2008–09 Grand Prix of Figure Skating Final was the senior and junior Grand Prix Final competition of the 2008–09 season. It was the culminating competition of the 2008–09 ISU Grand Prix of Figure Skating, a senior-level international invitational competition, and the 2008–09 ISU Junior Grand Prix, a junior-level international competition. The junior and senior finals were hosted together for the first time.

Skaters had earned points towards qualifying for the senior Grand Prix Final at the 2008 Skate America, the 2008 Skate Canada International, the 2008 Cup of China, the 2008 Trophée Eric Bompard, the 2008 Cup of Russia, and the 2008 NHK Trophy. Skaters had earned points towards qualifying for the junior Grand Prix Final at each of the eight Junior Grand Prix events. The six highest ranking skaters/teams from the Grand Prix series and the eight highest ranking skaters/teams from the Junior Grand Prix met at the Grand Prix Final.

Hosted by the Korea Skating Union, the Grand Prix Final was held in Goyang, South Korea from December 10 to 14, 2008. Medals were awarded in the disciplines of men's singles, ladies' singles, pair skating, and ice dancing on the senior and junior levels.

Unlike the other events in both series, there was no compulsory dance portion of the competition. Ice dancers were ranked in the original dance starting order in reverse order of their qualification to the Final.

== Schedule ==
All times are Korea Standard Time (UTC+9).

- Thursday, December 11
  - 16:00 Opening ceremony
  - 16:45 Junior ice dancing - Original dance
  - 18:10 Junior men - Short program
  - 19:35 Junior pairs - Short program
  - 21:00 Junior ladies - Short program
- Friday, December 12
  - 14:24 Junior pairs - Free skating
  - 16:00 Junior men - Free skating
  - 18:00 Senior ice dancing - Original dance
  - 19:10 Senior men - Short program
  - 20:15 Senior ladies - Short program
  - 21:20 Senior pairs - Short program
- Saturday, December 13
  - 14:00 Junior ice dancing - Free dance
  - 15:25 Junior ladies - Free skating
  - 17:30 Senior ice dancing - Free dance
  - 18:50 Senior men - Free skating
  - 20:05 Senior ladies - Free skating
  - 21:45 Senior pairs - Free skating
- Sunday, December 14
  - 14:00 Gala exhibition

== Qualifiers ==
=== Senior-level qualifiers ===
The following skaters qualified for the Grand Prix Final, in order of qualification.

	Men	Ladies	Pairs	Ice dancing
1	(Canada) Patrick Chan	(South Korea) Kim Yuna	(Germany) Aliona Savchenko / Robin Szolkowy	(France) Isabelle Delobel / Olivier Schoenfelder
2	(Japan) Takahiko Kozuka	(Canada) Joannie Rochette	(China) Zhang Dan / Zhang Hao	(Russia) Oksana Domnina / Maxim Shabalin
3	(United States) Johnny Weir	(Japan) Mao Asada	(Russia) Yuko Kawaguchi / Alexander Smirnov	(Italy) Federica Faiella / Massimo Scali
4	(France) Brian Joubert	(Italy) Carolina Kostner	(China) Pang Qing / Tong Jian	(Russia) Jana Khokhlova / Sergei Novitski
5	(United States) Jeremy Abbott	(Japan) Yukari Nakano	(Ukraine) Tatiana Volosozhar / Stanislav Morozov	(United States) Meryl Davis / Charlie White
6	(Czech Republic) Tomáš Verner	(Japan) Miki Ando	(Russia) Maria Mukhortova / Maxim Trankov	(United States) Tanith Belbin / Benjamin Agosto
Alternates
1st	(France) Alban Préaubert	(Japan) Fumie Suguri	(United States) Keauna McLaughlin / Rockne Brubaker	(France) Nathalie Péchalat / Fabian Bourzat
2nd	(United States) Evan Lysacek	(United States) Rachael Flatt	(Canada) Jessica Dubé / Bryce Davison	(Canada) Vanessa Crone / Paul Poirier
3rd	(France) Yannick Ponsero	(United States) Alissa Czisny	(United States) Rena Inoue / John Baldwin	(United Kingdom) Sinead Kerr / John Kerr

=== Junior-level qualifiers ===
The following skaters qualified for the 2008–09 Junior Grand Prix Final, in order of qualification.

- Michal Březina, the second qualifier in the men's event, withdrew on December 1. Artur Gachinski, the first alternate, replaced him.
- Piper Gilles / Zachary Donohue, the fifth qualifiers in the ice dancing event, withdrew due to an injury to Gilles. Marina Antipova / Artem Kudashev, the first alternates, replaced them.
- Ekaterina Sheremetieva / Mikhail Kuznetsov, the first alternates in the pairs event, withdrew on December 1.

	Men	Ladies	Pairs	Ice dancing
1	(United States) Richard Dornbush	(United States) Kristine Musademba	(Russia) Lubov Iliushechkina / Nodari Maisuradze	(United States) Madison Hubbell / Keiffer Hubbell
2	(Czech Republic) Michal Březina (WD)	(Japan) Yukiko Fujisawa	(Russia) Anastasia Martiusheva / Alexei Rogonov	(United States) Madison Chock / Greg Zuerlein
3	(United States) Armin Mahbanoozadeh	(United States) Alexe Gilles	(Russia) Sabina Imaikina / Andrei Novoselov	(United States) Maia Shibutani / Alex Shibutani
4	(United States) Alexander Johnson	(Japan) Kanako Murakami	(Russia) Ksenia Krasilnikova / Konstantin Bezmaternikh	(Russia) Ekaterina Riazanova / Jonathan Guerreiro
5	(France) Florent Amodio	(United States) Amanda Dobbs	(Russia) Ksenia Ozerova / Alexander Enbert	(United States) Piper Gilles / Zachary Donohue (WD)
6	(Russia) Ivan Bariev	(United States) Becky Bereswill	(Japan) Narumi Takahashi / Mervin Tran	(Ukraine) Alisa Agafonova / Dmitri Dun
7	(Kazakhstan) Denis Ten	(United States) Angela Maxwell	(China) Zhang Yue / Wang Lei	(Canada) Kharis Ralph / Asher Hill
8	(Canada) Elladj Baldé	(Canada) Diane Szmiett	(United States) Marissa Castelli / Simon Shnapir	(Russia) Ekaterina Pushkash / Dmitri Kiselev
Alternates
1st	(Russia) Artur Gachinski (called up)	(Italy) Stefania Berton	(Russia) Ekaterina Sheremetieva / Mikhail Kuznetsov (WD)	(Russia) Marina Antipova / Artem Kudashev (called up)
2nd	(United States) Keegan Messing	(Germany) Sarah Hecken	(Canada) Paige Lawrence / Rudi Swiegers	(Canada) Karen Routhier / Eric Saucke-Lacelle
3rd	(China) Cheng Gongming	(Japan) Shoko Ishikawa	(Switzerland) Anaïs Morand / Antoine Dorsaz	(Czech Republic) Lucie Myslivečková / Matěj Novák

== Senior-level results ==
=== Men ===
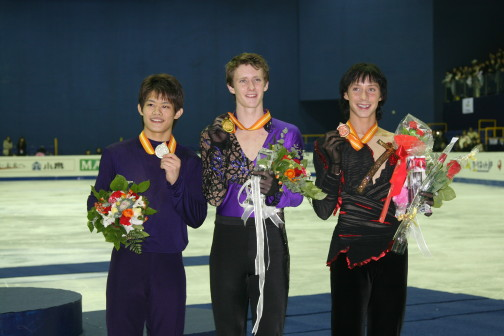
The men's podium. From left: Takahiko Kozuka (2nd), Jeremy Abbott (1st), Johnny Weir (3rd).

Rank	Name	Nation	Total points	SP		FS	
1	Jeremy Abbott	United States	237.72	2	78.26	1	159.46
2	Takahiko Kozuka	Japan	224.63	1	83.90	3	140.73
3	Johnny Weir	United States	215.50	4	72.50	2	143.00
4	Tomáš Verner	Czech Republic	206.65	5	69.34	4	137.31
5	Patrick Chan	Canada	205.16	6	68.00	5	137.16
WD	Brian Joubert	France		3	74.55		

=== Ladies ===
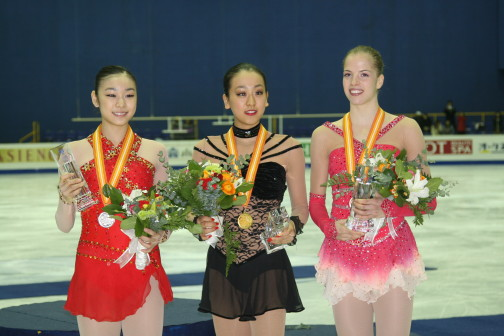
The ladies' podium. From left: Kim Yuna (2nd), Mao Asada (1st), Carolina Kostner (3rd).

This was Mao Asada's second win.

Rank	Name	Nation	Total points	SP		FS	
1	Mao Asada	Japan	188.55	2	65.38	1	123.17
2	Kim Yuna	South Korea	186.35	1	65.94	2	120.41
3	Carolina Kostner	Italy	168.01	4	55.88	4	112.13
4	Joannie Rochette	Canada	166.36	6	50.48	3	115.88
5	Yukari Nakano	Japan	161.93	3	62.08	6	99.85
6	Miki Ando	Japan	158.25	5	55.44	5	102.81

=== Pairs ===
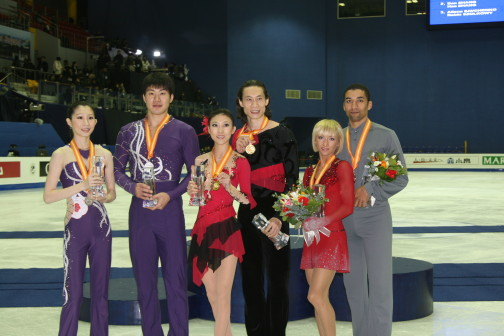
The pairs' podium. From left: Zhang Dan / Zhang Hao (2nd), Pang Qing / Tong Jian (1st), Aliona Savchenko / Robin Szolkowy (3rd).

Rank	Name	Nation	Total points	SP		FS	
1	Pang Qing / Tong Jian	China	191.49	3	66.24	1	125.25
2	Zhang Dan / Zhang Hao	China	188.22	2	68.34	2	119.88
3	Aliona Savchenko / Robin Szolkowy	Germany	185.09	1	70.14	3	114.95
4	Tatiana Volosozhar / Stanislav Morozov	Ukraine	175.83	4	64.08	5	111.75
5	Yuko Kawaguchi / Alexander Smirnov	Russia	167.45	6	55.42	4	112.03
6	Maria Mukhortova / Maxim Trankov	Russia	153.16	5	61.56	6	91.60

=== Ice dancing ===
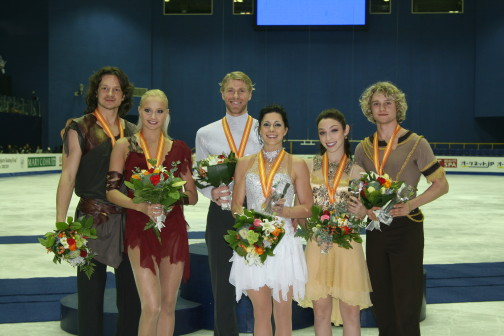
The ice dancing podium. From left: Oksana Domnina / Maxim Shabalin (2nd), Isabelle Delobel / Olivier Schoenfelder (1st), Meryl Davis / Charlie White (3rd).

Rank	Name	Nation	Total points	OD		FD	
1	Isabelle Delobel / Olivier Schoenfelder	France	156.10	1	60.35	1	95.75
2	Oksana Domnina / Maxim Shabalin	Russia	152.95	2	59.33	2	93.62
3	Meryl Davis / Charlie White	United States	148.04	5	55.89	3	92.15
4	Federica Faiella / Massimo Scali	Italy	145.12	3	57.89	4	87.23
WD	Tanith Belbin / Benjamin Agosto	United States		4	57.33		
WD	Jana Khokhlova / Sergei Novitski	Russia					

== Junior-level results ==
=== Men ===
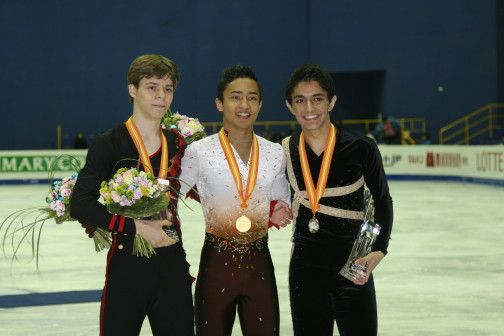
The junior men's podium. From left: Richard Dornbush (3rd), Florent Amodio (1st), Armin Mahbanoozadeh (2nd).

Rank	Name	Nation	Total points	SP		FS	
1	Florent Amodio	France	199.58	1	68.20	1	131.38
2	Armin Mahbanoozadeh	United States	193.48	2	67.05	2	126.43
3	Richard Dornbush	United States	183.93	3	66.50	4	117.43
4	Ivan Bariev	Russia	180.65	5	63.75	5	116.90
5	Denis Ten	Kazakhstan	180.34	7	60.59	3	119.75
6	Alexander Johnson	United States	178.40	4	64.85	6	113.55
7	Elladj Baldé	Canada	170.34	8	59.89	7	110.45
8	Artur Gachinski	Russia	168.68	6	62.20	8	106.48

=== Ladies ===
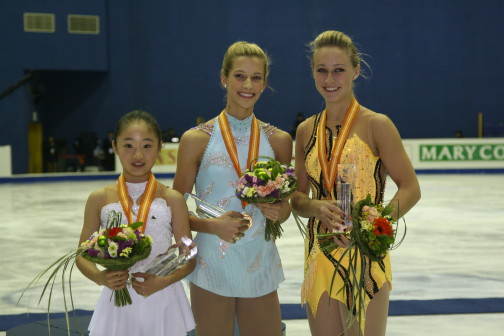
The junior ladies' podium. From left: Yukiko Fujisawa (2nd), Becky Bereswill (1st), Alexe Gilles (3rd).

Rank	Name	Nation	Total points	SP		FS	
1	Becky Bereswill	United States	146.69	4	48.68	2	98.01
2	Yukiko Fujisawa	Japan	145.92	7	44.48	1	101.44
3	Alexe Gilles	United States	144.49	1	54.24	4	90.25
4	Kanako Murakami	Japan	141.63	2	51.04	3	90.59
5	Angela Maxwell	United States	131.75	3	48.84	5	82.91
6	Kristine Musademba	United States	122.86	8	43.04	6	79.82
7	Amanda Dobbs	United States	117.07	5	47.48	7	69.59
8	Diane Szmiett	Canada	113.25	6	45.64	8	67.61

=== Pairs ===
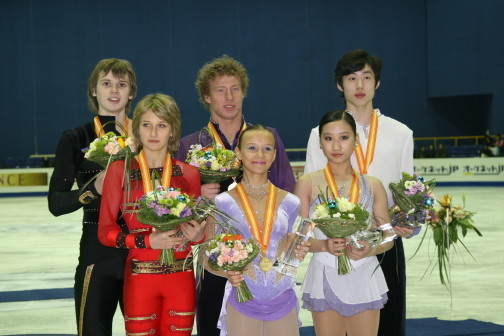
The junior pairs' podium. From left: Ksenia Krasilnikova / Konstantin Bezmaternikh (3rd), Lubov Iliushechkina / Nodari Maisuradze (1st), Zhang Yue / Wang Lei (2nd).

Rank	Name	Nation	Total points	SP		FS	
1	Lubov Iliushechkina / Nodari Maisuradze	Russia	149.38	1	56.88	1	92.50
2	Zhang Yue / Wang Lei	China	137.92	4	50.22	3	87.70
3	Ksenia Krasilnikova / Konstantin Bezmaternikh	Russia	137.22	2	51.54	5	85.68
4	Anastasia Martiusheva / Alexei Rogonov	Russia	137.03	3	50.60	4	86.43
5	Sabina Imaikina / Andrei Novoselov	Russia	134.91	5	46.04	2	88.87
6	Marissa Castelli / Simon Shnapir	United States	126.40	6	44.84	6	81.56
7	Narumi Takahashi / Mervin Tran	Japan	106.04	8	34.24	7	71.80
WD	Ksenia Ozerova / Alexander Enbert	Russia		7	43.46		

=== Ice dancing ===
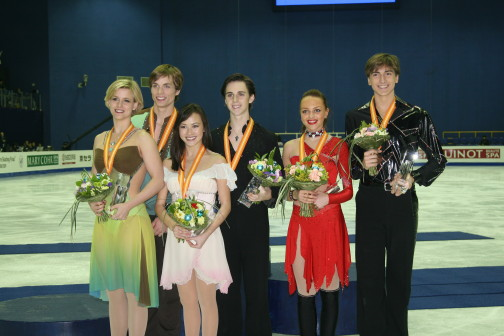
The junior ice dancing podium. From left: Madison Hubbell / Keiffer Hubbell (2nd), Madison Chock / Greg Zuerlein (1st), Ekaterina Riazanova / Jonathan Guerreiro (3rd).

Rank	Name	Nation	Total points	OD		FD	
1	Madison Chock / Greg Zuerlein	United States	131.15	1	51.84	1	79.31
2	Madison Hubbell / Keiffer Hubbell	United States	124.68	6	47.98	2	76.70
3	Ekaterina Riazanova / Jonathan Guerreiro	Russia	124.30	2	50.85	4	73.45
4	Maia Shibutani / Alex Shibutani	United States	120.60	7	47.05	3	73.55
5	Ekaterina Pushkash / Dmitri Kiselev	Russia	120.35	5	48.59	5	71.76
6	Kharis Ralph / Asher Hill	Canada	120.09	4	48.72	6	71.37
7	Alisa Agafonova / Dmitri Dun	Ukraine	119.38	3	49.45	7	69.93
8	Marina Antipova / Artem Kudashev	Russia	111.43	8	43.64	8	67.79

== Medals table ==
Rank	Nation	Gold	Silver	Bronze	Total
1	United States (USA)	3	2	4	9
2	France (FRA)	2	0	0	2
3	China (CHN)	1	2	0	3
3	Japan (JPN)	1	2	0	3
5	Russia (RUS)	1	1	2	4
6	South Korea (KOR)	0	1	0	1
7	Germany (GER)	0	0	1	1
7	Italy (ITA)	0	0	1	1
Totals (8 entries)		8	8	8	24
