= Yukiko Fujisawa =

Japanese figure skater

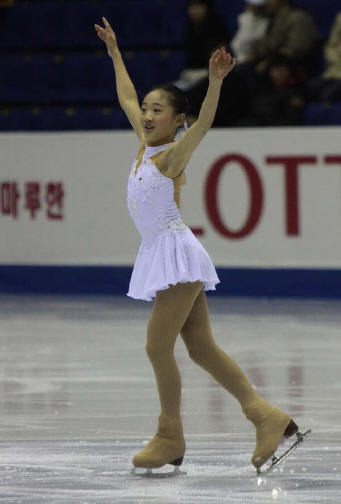
- Fujisawa at the 2008–09 Junior Grand Prix Final.

Personal information
- Born: April 14, 1995 (age 31) Chiba
- Height: 1.49 m (4 ft 11 in)

Figure skating career
- Country: Japan
- Coach: Yumi Kono
- Skating club: Iizuka FSC
- Began skating: 2000

Yukiko Fujisawa (藤澤 亮子, Fujisawa Yukiko; born April 14, 1995) is a Japanese former figure skater. She was born in Chiba. She is the 2008 JGP Czech Skate champion, 2009 JGP Final silver medalist, and 2010 Japanese junior bronze medalist.

== Programs ==
Season	Short program	Free skating	Exhibition
2011–12	The Cotton Club by John Barry	Malagueña by Ernesto Lecuona	
2010–11	Tango from Cirque du Soleil by René Dupéré	Paquita by Ludwig Minkus	
2009–10	Tango from Cirque du Soleil by René Dupéré	Salome by Roque Banos	
2008–09	The Railway Children by Lionel Jeffries	Cinderella by Sergei Prokofiev	Dueling Banjos; Cotton-Eyed Joe

== Competitive highlights ==
JGP: ISU Junior Grand Prix

International
Event	07–08	08–09	09–10	10–11	11–12	12–13	13–14
Golden Spin of Zagreb					10th		
Mont Blanc Trophy			2nd				
International: Junior
JGP Final		2nd					
JGP Austria				8th			
JGP Czech Republic		1st					
JGP Germany				5th			
JGP Romania					6th		
JGP United Kingdom		2nd					
JGP United States			4th				
National
Japan Championships			10th			18th	18th
Japan Junior Champ.	19th	8th	3rd	11th	14th		

=== Detailed results ===
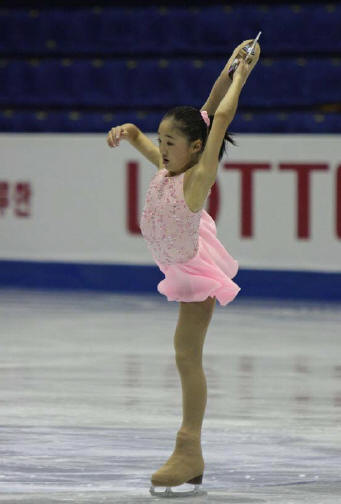
Fujisawa performs a spiral at the 2008–09 JGP Final.

2011–12 season
Date	Event	Level	SP	FS	Total
September 21–24, 2011	2011 Junior Grand Prix, Romania	Junior	4; 45.73	7; 76.84	6; 122.57
2010–11 season
Date	Event	Level	SP	FS	Total
November 26–28, 2010	2010–11 Japan Junior Championships	Junior	21; 39.56	5; 89.46	11; 129.02
October 6–10, 2010	2010 Junior Grand Prix, Germany	Junior	6; 43.61	5; 91.21	5; 134.82
September 15–19, 2010	2010 Junior Grand Prix, Austria	Junior	10; 41.45	7; 81.43	8; 122.88
2009–10 Season
Date	Event	Level	SP	FS	Total
February 3–7, 2010	2010 Mont Blanc Trophy	Senior	1; 50.26	3; 79.58	2; 129.84
December 25–27, 2009	2009–10 Japan Championships	Senior	9; 55.82	11; 102.06	10; 157.88
November 21–23, 2009	2009–10 Japan Junior Championships	Junior	2; 51.20	4; 84.07	3; 135.27
September 2–6, 2009	2009 Junior Grand Prix, USA	Junior	2; 48.79	8; 70.78	4; 119.57
2008–09 season
Date	Event	Level	SP	FS	Total
December 10–14	2008–09 Junior Grand Prix Final	Junior	7; 44.48	1; 101.44	2; 145.92
November 23–24, 2008	2008–09 Japan Junior Championships	Junior	13; 43.16	5; 89.96	8; 133.12
October 15–18, 2008	2008 Junior Grand Prix, Great Britain	Junior	4; 50.82	1; 98.46	2; 149.28
17 - 21 Sept, 2008	2008 Junior Grand Prix, Czech Republic	Junior	2; 50.32	1; 97.93	1; 148.25
2007–08 season
Date	Event	Level	SP	FS	Total
November 24–25, 2007	2007–08 Japan Junior Championships	Junior	20; 36.72	15; 68.94	19; 105.66
October 27–29, 2007	2007–08 Japan Novice Championships	Novice	-	2nd 74.10	2nd 74.10
