= Angela Maxwell =

American figure skater

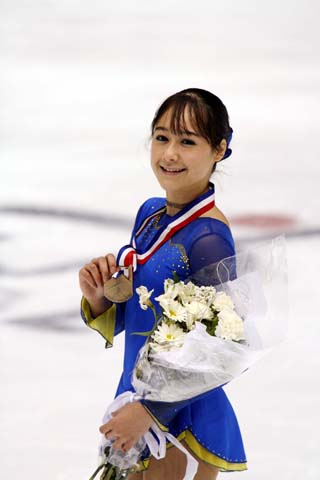
- Maxwell in 2007

Personal information
- Full name: Angela Yuka Maxwell
- Born: July 28, 1992 (age 33) Arlington, Texas, U.S.
- Height: 4 ft 11 in (1.49 m)

Figure skating career
- Country: United States
- Coach: Olga Orlova, Craig Maurizi, Natalia Mishkutenok, Alexey Letov, Cheryl Pascarelli
- Skating club: SC of New York

Angela Yuka Maxwell (born July 28, 1992) is an American former competitive figure skater. She won five medals on the ISU Junior Grand Prix series and the junior silver medal at the 2008 U.S. Championships.

== Personal life ==
Angela Maxwell was born in Arlington, Texas. She lived and trained in Dallas, Texas, from the beginning of her career until 2008. In 2008, she moved to Hackensack, New Jersey, to train.

Maxwell is Japanese-American. Her mother is of Japanese descent and her father is of European descent.

== Career ==
Angela Maxwell began skating at age six. She first performed a backflip on ice at age nine.

In the 2003–04 season, Maxwell won the Southwestern Regional Championships on the juvenile level to qualify for the 2004 U.S. Junior Championships, which are the national championships in the United States for juvenile and intermediate level skaters. She placed 11th at the 2004 Junior Nationals.

The following season, she moved up to the intermediate level. She won the silver medal at the 2005 Southwestern Regionals and qualified for the 2005 U.S. Junior Championships. She placed fourth at that competition and won the pewter medal.

In the 2005–06 season, Maxwell moved up to the novice level. She won the silver medal at the 2006 Southwestern Regionals behind Alexe Gilles and qualified for the 2006 Midwestern Sectional Championships. She won the silver medal at that competition behind Rhiana Brammeier, which qualified her for the 2006 U.S. Championships. At the 2006 Nationals, Maxwell placed 11th. She was coached by Cheryl Pascarelli.

Maxwell made a coaching change and remained on the novice level in the 2006–07 season. She won both her regional and sectional competitions to qualify for the 2007 U.S. Championships. She won the national novice title and was invited to skate in the exhibition gala. Maxwell performed an exhibition to the music of Jock Jams and performed two backflips on the ice. She was coached by Alexey Letov. After Nationals, she competed at the International Challenge Cup on the novice level and won the competition. It was her first international competition.

In the 2007–08 season, Maxwell moved up to the junior level and was coached by Natalia Mishkutenok. She won the bronze medal at the 2007–08 ISU Junior Grand Prix event in Lake Placid, New York, which was the first event of the series, and performed a backflip on the ice on her way to accepting the medal. She was part of a US sweep at that competition of the ladies podium along with gold medalist Mirai Nagasu and silver medalist Alexe Gilles. Although her medal put her in a position to potentially qualify for the 2007–08 JGP Final, she did not receive a second assignment. Because she did not qualify for the Final, Maxwell had to qualify for the 2008 U.S. Championships through regionals and sectionals. She won the silver medal at the Southwestern Regionals on the junior level behind Chaochih Liu. She won the Midwestern Sectionals. At Nationals, Maxwell won the silver medal behind Alexe Gilles. Maxwell was the second alternate to the 2008 World Junior Championships.

Ahead of the 2008–09 season, Maxwell relocated from Dallas, Texas, to Hackensack, New Jersey, where she chose Olga Orlova as her new coach. She began her season at the 2008–09 ISU Junior Grand Prix event in Ostrava, Czech Republic, and won the silver medal. She then competed at the JGP event in Sheffield in England, where she took the bronze. She, thus, qualified for the JGP Final, where she finished 5th overall. She competed for the first time as a senior at the 2009 U.S. Championships, where she finished in 8th place.

In the 2009–10 ISU Junior Grand Prix series, Maxwell won silver medals in Hungary and Germany, earning qualification to her second JGP Final, where she finished 6th.

== Programs ==
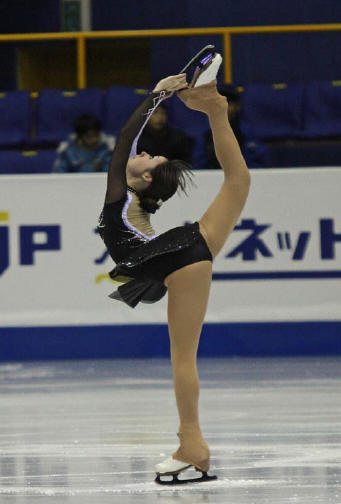
Maxwell performs a Biellmann spin during her What Hands Can Do/Waltz Masquerade short program at the 2008-2009 Junior Grand Prix Final.

Season	Short program	Free skating	Exhibition
2009–10	Santa Maria (del Buen Ayre) by Gotan Project; Libertango by Astor Piazzolla	Nostradamus by Maksim Mrvica; Vampire Knight Guilty (from Vampire Knight) by Haketa Takefumi	
2008–09	What Hands Can Do? by Beatsucht, Florian Lakenmacher and David Paulicke; Waltz Masquerade by Aram Khachaturian performed by the London Symphony Orchestra choreo. by Robin Wagner	Inuyasha Themes from Inuyasha by Kaoru Wada choreo. by Robin Wagner	
2007–08	Take Five by Dave Brubeck	Finding Nemo by Thomas Newman, Robbie Williams, Antônio Carlos Jobim, Bernard Herrmann, Bob Bain	
2006–07	Flamenco from Mr. & Mrs. Smith by John Powell choreo. by Olga Ganicheva	Children of Dune by Brian Tyler choreo. by Olga Ganicheva	Jock Jams Disco music medley
2005–06	Shout; Feel It (from Swing Kids) by Benny Goodman choreo. by Evgueni Nemirovskii, Scott Brown	The Red Poppy by Reinhold Glière choreo. by Evgueni Nemirovskii, Scott Brown	
2004–05	Chopsticks by Euphemia Allen	Miss Saigon by Claude-Michel Schönberg	

== Competitive highlights ==
International
Event	07–08	08–09	09–10
JGP Final		5th	6th
JGP Czech Republic		2nd	
JGP Germany			2nd
JGP Hungary			2nd
JGP United Kingdom		3rd	
JGP United States	3rd		
National
U.S. Championships	2nd J	8th	
J: Junior
