= Sabina Imaikina =

Russian pair skater

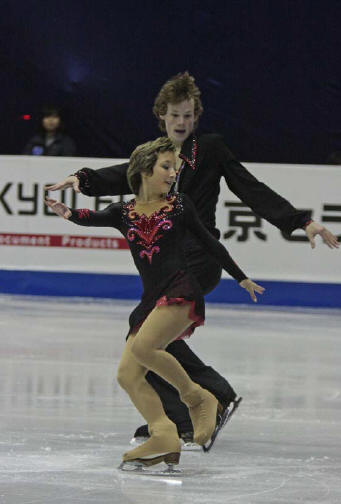
- Imaikina/Novoselov in 2008.

Personal information
- Full name: Sabina Ilgizarovna Imaikina
- Born: 25 March 1993 (age 33) Perm, Russia
- Height: 1.52 m (5 ft 0 in)

Figure skating career
- Country: Russia
- Skating club: Yubileyny

Sabina Ilgizarovna Imaikina (Russian: Сабина Ильгизаровна Имайкина; born 25 March 1993) is a Russian former pair skater. Competing with Andrei Novoselov, she won two silver medals on the 2008 ISU Junior Grand Prix series and qualified for the 2008–09 JGP Final, where they placed 5th. At the 2009 Russian Championships, the pair placed fifth on the senior level and took bronze on the junior level. They were coached by Valeri Tiukov and Valentina Tiukova in Perm. They parted ways at the end of the season.

Imaikina teamed up with Semen Stepanov in 2009 and finished 10th at the 2010 Russian Championships. In 2010, she partnered with Konstantin Bezmaternikh and finished 10th at the 2011 Russian Championships. In February 2011, they announced they would no longer skate together.

== Programs ==
=== With Novoselov ===
Season	Short program	Free skating
2008–2009	The Dolphin and the Mermaid by Igor Nikolaev	Mask of Zorro by James Horner

== Competitive highlights ==
=== With Bezmaternikh ===
International
Event	2010–11
Winter Universiade	4th
National
Russian Championships	10th

=== With Stepanov ===
Event	2009–10
Russian Championships	10th

=== With Novoselov ===
International
Event	2007–08	2008–09
JGP Final		1st
JGP Czech Republic		1st
JGP United Kingdom		1st
JGP United States	1st	
National
Russian Champ.		1st
Russian Junior Champ.	1st	1st
