= Zachary Donohue =

American ice dancer

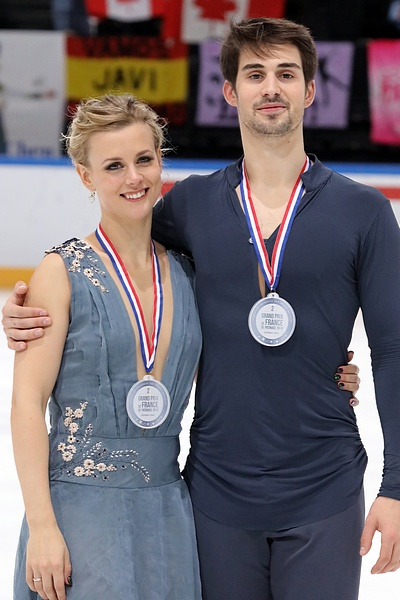
- Madison Hubbell and Zachary Donohue at the 2016 Trophée de France

Personal information
- Full name: Zachary Tyler Donohue
- Born: January 8, 1991 (age 35) Madison, Connecticut, U.S.
- Height: 6 ft 2 in (1.88 m)

Figure skating career
- Country: United States
- Discipline: Ice dance
- Partner: Madison Hubbell (2011–22); Alissandra Aronow (2010–11); Piper Gilles (2008–10)
- Began skating: 2001
- Retired: 2022
- Highest WS: 1st (2018–19)
Event	Gold medal – first place	Silver medal – second place	Bronze medal – third place
Olympic Games	1	0	1
World Championships	0	3	1
Four Continents Championships	1	0	1
Grand Prix Final	1	0	1
U.S. Championships	3	2	4
World Team Trophy	1	0	0
Medal list
Olympic Games
Gold medal – first place	2022 Beijing	Team
Bronze medal – third place	2022 Beijing	Ice dance
World Championships
Silver medal – second place	2018 Milan	Ice dance
Silver medal – second place	2021 Stockholm	Ice dance
Silver medal – second place	2022 Montpellier	Ice dance
Bronze medal – third place	2019 Saitama	Ice dance
Four Continents Championships
Gold medal – first place	2014 Taipei	Ice dance
Bronze medal – third place	2020 Seoul	Ice dance
Grand Prix Final
Gold medal – first place	2018–19 Vancouver	Ice dance
Bronze medal – third place	2019–20 Turin	Ice dance
U.S. Championships
Gold medal – first place	2018 San Jose	Ice dance
Gold medal – first place	2019 Detroit	Ice dance
Gold medal – first place	2021 Las Vegas	Ice dance
Silver medal – second place	2020 Greensboro	Ice dance
Silver medal – second place	2022 Nashville	Ice dance
Bronze medal – third place	2012 San Jose	Ice dance
Bronze medal – third place	2015 Greensboro	Ice dance
Bronze medal – third place	2016 Saint Paul	Ice dance
Bronze medal – third place	2017 Kansas City	Ice dance
World Team Trophy
Gold medal – first place	2019 Fukuoka	Team

Zachary Tyler Donohue (born January 8, 1991) is an American former ice dancer. With Madison Hubbell, he is a two-time 2022 Winter Olympics medalist, a four-time World medalist, the 2018 Grand Prix Final champion, the 2014 Four Continents champion, and a three-time U.S. national champion (2018–2019, 2021).

With Piper Gilles, Donohue won three medals on the ISU Junior Grand Prix series from 2008 to 2009.

== Personal life ==
Donohue was born on January 8, 1991, in Hartford, Connecticut, and was raised in Madison, Connecticut. He was home-schooled through high school.

Donohue and Hubbell were romantically involved in the early years of their partnership, but ultimately they opted to focus on their competitive career.

On June 11, 2022, Donohue and Australian ice dancer Chantelle Kerry became engaged. They were married in Sydney, Australia, on September 18, 2022.

== Early career ==
Donohue began learning to skate in 2001. In the 2005–2006 season, he competed with Sara Bailey. The following season, he skated with Kaylyn Patitucci. Having placed fifth on the novice level at the Eastern Sectional Championships, they did not advance to the 2007 U.S. Championships.

Donohue placed fifth in the junior category with Lili Lamar at the 2008 Eastern Sectional Championships. Their result was insufficient to advance to the 2008 U.S. Championships.

=== Partnership with Gilles ===
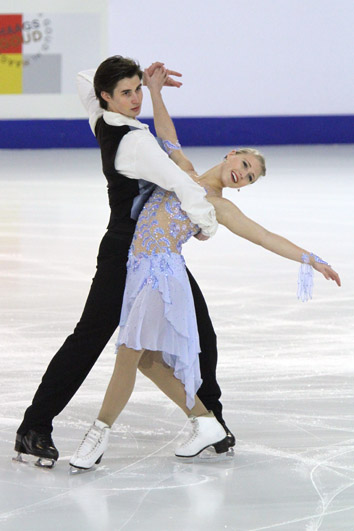
Gilles and Donohue at the 2010 World Junior Championships

Donohue teamed up with Piper Gilles ahead of the 2008–2009 season. Making their international debut, they won gold at the 2008–09 ISU Junior Grand Prix event in Ostrava, Czech Republic. They took silver at their second assignment, in Cape Town, South Africa. Their results qualified them for the 2008–09 Junior Grand Prix Final in South Korea, but they withdrew before the competition due to an injury to Gilles. They won the junior bronze medal at the 2009 and 2010 U.S. Championships.

Gilles/Donohue were selected to compete for the United States at the 2010 World Junior Championships and placed ninth out of 34 teams. They announced their split in May 2010. Reflecting on the end of the partnership years later, Gilles said that she and Donohue were "very similar – very emotional and driven – but it didn't work for us. And we tried, we tried so hard to make it work, and again, it just wasn't the right partnership for either of us."

=== Partnership with Aronow ===
Donohue teamed up with Alissandra Aronow in 2010. They trained in Canton, Michigan, under the coaching team of Igor Shpilband and Marina Zueva, and competed in the senior ranks. They ended their partnership shortly after the 2011 U.S. Championships.

== Hubbell and Donohue ==
=== 2011–2012 season ===
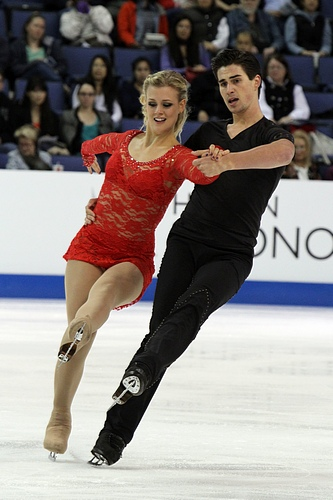
Hubbell and Donohue at the 2011 Skate America

On May 12, 2011, U.S. Figure Skating announced Donohue's new partnership with Madison Hubbell. The two decided to train at the Detroit Skating Club under the guidance of the coaching team of Pasquale Camerlengo, Anjelika Krylova, and Natalia Annenko-Deller.

Hubbell/Donohue made their international debut at the 2011 Nebelhorn Trophy, winning the gold medal. After taking bronze at the 2012 U.S. Championships, they were selected to compete at two ISU Championships; they placed fifth at the 2012 Four Continents in Colorado Springs, Colorado, and tenth at the 2012 World Championships in Nice, France.

=== 2012–2013 season ===
Hubbell/Donohue took bronze at the 2012 Finlandia Trophy and competed at two Grand Prix events. They placed fifth at the 2012 Skate Canada International and fourth at the 2012 Trophée Éric Bompard (second in the free dance). After finishing fourth at the 2013 U.S. Championships, they were not selected for any ISU Championships.

=== 2013–2014 season: Four Continents gold ===
After sustaining a concussion in June 2013, Hubbell spent six weeks recuperating. She attributed the injury to a "lack of focus, as painful as that is to admit. I finished twizzles, I did my 3-turn, and I fell off my heel."

Hubbell/Donohue won gold at the 2013 Nebelhorn Trophy, placed fourth at the 2013 Skate America, and won their first Grand Prix medal, bronze, at the 2013 Skate Canada International. After placing fourth at the 2014 U.S. Championships, they were assigned to the 2014 Four Continents Championships and finished ahead of Piper Gilles / Paul Poirier to take the gold medal. Hubbell/Donohue were first alternates for the 2014 World Championships but did not take the slot made available when Meryl Davis / Charlie White withdrew; Hubbell had sustained a torn labrum in her left hip and underwent surgery in March 2014.

=== 2014–2015 season ===
Hubbell/Donohue won bronze at both of their Grand Prix events, the 2014 Skate Canada International and 2014 Trophée Éric Bompard, and then took bronze at the 2015 U.S. Championships. They placed tenth at the 2015 World Championships in Shanghai, China.

On April 13, 2015, Hubbell/Donohue announced that they had started training with Marie-France Dubreuil and Patrice Lauzon at the Centre Gadbois in Montreal.

=== 2015–2016 season ===
In November 2015, Hubbell/Donohue won their first Grand Prix title, taking gold at the 2015 Trophée Éric Bompard in Bordeaux as a result of their first place in the short dance, ahead of Canada's Piper Gilles / Paul Poirier. The second day of competition was canceled due to the November 2015 Paris attacks. After winning bronze at the 2015 NHK Trophy, the two qualified to their first Grand Prix Final, where they finished sixth.

Hubbell/Donohue took the bronze medal at the 2016 U.S. Championships. They placed fourth at the 2016 Four Continents Championships in Taipei and sixth at the 2016 World Championships in Boston.

=== 2016–2017 season ===
Ranked third in both segments at the 2017 U.S. Championships, Hubbell/Donohue remained national bronze medalists for a third consecutive year. In February, they placed fourth in the short dance, sixth in the free, and fourth overall at the 2017 Four Continents Championships in Gangneung, South Korea.

In March, Hubbell/Donohue won a small bronze medal for their short dance at the 2017 World Championships in Helsinki, Finland. They dropped to 9th overall after placing 10th in the free dance.

=== 2017–2018 season: World silver ===
Hubbell/Donohue began their season with gold at the 2017 CS U.S. International Classic. After taking bronze at the 2017 Skate Canada International and silver at the 2017 NHK Trophy, they qualified to their third consecutive Grand Prix Final. They finished fourth at the event in Nagoya, Japan.

At the 2018 U.S. Championships, Hubbell/Donohue placed second behind Maia and Alex Shibutani in the short dance and then second to Madison Chock / Evan Bates in the free dance. They won their first national title by a margin of 0.19 over the Shibutanis and 0.52 over Chock/Bates. All of the ice dancing medalists were named to the U.S. Olympic team.

Hubbell/Donohue were not selected for the team event but competed in the individual ice dancing event. In the short dance, they placed third, behind training mates Tessa Virtue / Scott Moir and Gabriella Papadakis / Guillaume Cizeron, and 0.02 points ahead of the Shibutanis. In the free dance, Donohue put both hands down in the middle of a sliding move, which constituted a technical fall. As a result, they finished fifth in the free dance and fourth overall, 4.90 points behind the bronze medalists, the Shibutanis.

In March, Hubbell/Donohue won silver at the 2018 World Championships in Milan, having placed second in both segments.

=== 2018–2019 season: World bronze ===
Beginning the season again with a win at the U.S. Classic, Hubbell and Donohue were assigned to consecutive Grand Prix events, the 2018 Skate America and 2018 Skate Canada International. They won gold at both events, becoming the first team to qualify for the Grand Prix Final. After victory at Skate Canada International, Hubbell observed, "we wanted to challenge ourselves to become champions in difficult situations, and we knew that it was going to be really challenging to do two Grand Prix back to back at the beginning of the season." At the Grand Prix Final, they placed first in both programs and won the title.

At the 2019 U.S. Championships, facing a returning Chock/Bates, they won their second straight national title. They next competed at the 2019 Four Continents Championships, placing first in the rhythm dance with a new personal best. In the free dance, they unexpectedly dropped to fourth place following multiple errors, including receiving only a base level on their stationary lift after it was deemed non-stationary. As a result, they finished off the podium behind Chock/Bates, Kaitlyn Weaver / Andrew Poje, and Gilles/Poirier. Hubbell commented after, "certainly we would rather it happens here than the Worlds."

Hubbell/Donohue placed fourth in the rhythm dance at the 2019 World Championships, but overtook Alexandra Stepanova / Ivan Bukin in the free dance to place third overall, winning the bronze. Hubbell called it "our strongest performance this season", saying that their "goal was to do our best performance and the rest we can't control, and that was really what we have achieved." They next were part of the gold medal-winning Team USA at the 2019 World Team Trophy, concluding their season.

=== 2019–2020 season: Four Continents bronze ===
For the musical-themed rhythm dance, Hubbell/Donohue chose to skate a Marilyn Monroe program, a longtime goal of Hubbell's. Hubbell/Donohue were again assigned to the same consecutive events for the Grand Prix. They became two-time Skate America champions with a total of 209.55 points after placing first with a personal best of 84.97 points in the rhythm dance and second in the free dance with a score of 124.58, 0.08 points behind the free dance score of silver medalists Stepanova/Bukin. Donohue was suffering from bronchitis at the time of the event and commented that he hoped to have "two working lungs" by their next competition the following week. At 2019 Skate Canada International the following week, they narrowly led after the rhythm dance, 0.63 points ahead of Gilles/Poirier. They placed second in the free dance, and took the silver medal, in what was considered a significant upset loss.

Qualifying to the Grand Prix Final, Hubbell/Donohue placed second in the rhythm dance. Third in the free dance after having revised nine of the program elements in the interim since Skate Canada International, they won the bronze medal overall.

Entering the 2020 U.S. Championships seeking to win a third consecutive title, they placed second in the rhythm dance, with Donohue slightly losing balance at one point in the Finnstep pattern and their lift being graded at only a level 3. They finished second in the free dance as well, struggling after they came out of their dance spin facing the wrong direction, prompting Hubbell to comment that it was "probably one of the hardest performances, not enjoyable." They won the silver medal behind Chock/Bates.

Returning to the Four Continents Championships after the disappointment of the previous year, Hubbell/Donohue won the rhythm dance again, albeit by a margin of only 0.03 over Chock/Bates, and 2.03 points ahead of Gilles/Poirier in third. In the free dance, both made errors in their twizzle sequence, and they dropped to third place, winning the bronze medal. Hubbell admitted afterward that "our free dance has been a rocky one for us this season." They were assigned to compete at the World Championships in Montreal, but these were canceled as a result of the COVID-19 pandemic.

=== 2020–2021 season: World silver ===
Hubbell and Donohue recruited former training partner and double-Olympic champion Scott Moir as one of their choreographers for the new season, planning to regain momentum lost in the previous year, which they attributed in part to losing confidence in their programs after their loss at Skate Canada. With the ISU assigning the Grand Prix based mainly on training location to minimize international travel, Hubbell/Donohue were nevertheless assigned to the 2020 Skate America in Las Vegas and crossed the border to compete. They won the event for the third consecutive year.

Hubbell/Donohue returned to the United States again for the 2021 U.S. Championships, also held in Las Vegas. They placed second in the rhythm dance, 0.44 points behind Chock/Bates, who had not competed at Skate America due to injury. They won the free dance, skating cleanly, while Chock/Bates had a twizzle error and took their third national title. They were named to the American team for the 2021 World Championships in Stockholm.

The World Championships were held in a bubble without an audience, and Hubbell/Donohue's training partners and four-time World champions Papadakis/Cizeron declined to attend due to illness and lack of training time, leading to a very contested podium. Hubbell/Donohue placed second in the rhythm dance, two points behind Sinitsina/Katsalapov of Russia and narrowly ahead of Chock/Bates. They were third in the free dance, behind Sinitsina/Katsalapov and Canada's Gilles/Poirier, but remained in second overall by 0.36 points over Gilles/Poirier and won their second silver medal. Their placement combined with Chock/Bates' fourth qualified three berths for American ice dance teams at the 2022 Winter Olympics.

=== 2021–2022 season: Olympic medals and World silver ===
Hubbell/Donohue announced heading into the 2021–22 season that it would be their last before retiring. They won the 2021 U.S. Classic as their opening assignment, which for that season was not part of the Challenger series.

On the Grand Prix, Hubbell/Donohue began at 2021 Skate America, competing against primary domestic rivals Chock/Bates. They won both segments of the competition to take the gold medal, their fourth consecutive at the event and prevailing over Chock/Bates by 1.31 points. Donohue remarked afterward on his "overwhelming gratitude, being our last Skate America and four consecutive wins for us, it means quite a lot, especially to be able to have a live audience" following the pandemic restrictions in the preceding year and a half. They were initially assigned to the 2021 Cup of China as their second Grand Prix, but following its cancellation, they were reassigned to the 2021 Gran Premio d'Italia. With training partners Papadakis/Cizeron also assigned to the event, Hubbell/Donohue were the presumptive silver medalists, and finished second in both segments of the competition despite a late-program flub on their free dance choreographic lift. Hubbell joked afterward, "we made a mistake at the end, but sometimes you jump in the air, and you hit your partner in the crotch." Their results qualified them to the Grand Prix Final, but it was subsequently canceled due to restrictions prompted by the Omicron variant.

Seeking to defend their title at the 2022 U.S. Championships, Hubbell/Donohue placed second in the rhythm dance due to errors, ending up 2.55 points behind Chock/Bates. They went on to win the free dance but remained in second place overall. Hubbell said, "we wanted to end our career here at the U.S. Championships with a performance that felt present, and we're both very satisfied with how we skated. I think stepping off the ice; we knew we were content with what we put out there." They were subsequently named to the American Olympic team.

Hubbell/Donohue began the 2022 Winter Olympics as the American entries in the rhythm dance segment of the Olympic team event. They scored a new personal best of 86.56 to win the segment, securing ten points for the American team and notably prevailing over reigning World champions Sinitsina/Katsalapov of the ROC. Donohue, pleased with the results, said that "opening up our Olympics this way is really an honor." This was Hubbell and Donohue's first Olympic medal. Following a positive doping test of Russia's gold medalist Kamila Valieva, the team members were not awarded their medals, pending an investigation. In January 2024, the Court of Arbitration for Sport disqualified her, and the gold medal is projected to be awarded to the U.S. team. In the ice dance event, they finished in third place in the rhythm dance with another new personal best score of 87.13. Third in the free dance, despite a deduction for an extended lift, they won the bronze medal.

Hubbell and Donohue concluded their competitive careers at the 2022 World Championships, held in Montpellier. They finished second in the rhythm dance with a personal best score of 89.72, 3.01 points behind training mates Papadakis/Cizeron. In the free dance they set another personal best (132.67) as well as a personal best for total score (222.39), winning their third World silver medal. With Papadakis/Cizeron taking the gold medal and Chock/Bates the bronze, the entire podium consisted of skaters from the Ice Academy of Montreal. Hubbell said, "we knew that we wanted to skate our best for each other for our last moment, and we found peace in that. We're just very happy."

During the 2024 Paris Olympics, a medal ceremony was held for Hubbell/Donohue and their teammates from the 2022 Olympic Figure Skating Team Event, where they were awarded their Olympic gold medals.

== Programs ==
=== With Hubbell ===
Season	Short dance	Free dance	Exhibition
2021–2022	Hip Hop: Nasty; Blues: Rope Burn; Hip Hop: Rhythm Nation by Janet Jackson	Drowning by Anne Sila	Once I Was Loved by Melody Gardot
2020–2021	Burlesque: Express; A Guy Who Takes His Time; Tough Lover performed by Christina Aguilera	Hallelujah performed by Jeff Buckley; Pray Gently to the Night by Karl Hugo; Hallelujah performed by k.d. lang	Jealous by Labrinth
2019–2020	Jive: My Heart Belongs to Daddy by Cole Porter performed by Marilyn Monroe; West Coast Swing: Let's Be Bad (from Smash) by Marc Shaiman, Scott Wittman	A Star Is Born: Shallow by Lady Gaga, Mark Ronso, Andrew Wyatt, Anthony Rossomando; Alibi by Bradley Cooper, Lady Gaga, Lukas Nielson	New Girl by Finneas; Oats in the Water by Ben Howard
2018–2019	Tango: Alevare; Tango: Tangata del Alba by Astor Piazzolla	Romeo and Juliet: Introduction to Romeo; Kissing You (instrumental) (from Romeo + Juliet) by Craig Armstrong; Kissing You performed by Des'ree	Hallelujah performed by k.d. lang; Make Me Feel by Janelle Monáe choreo. by Samuel Chouinard
2017–2018	Samba: Le serpent by Guem; Rhumba: Cuando calienta el sol by Talya Ferro; Samba: Sambando (Los Ritmos Calientes)	Across the Sky (instrumental) by Rag'n'Bone Man; Caught Out in the Rain by Beth Hart	Across the Sky (instrumental) by Rag'n'Bone Man; Caught Out in the Rain by Beth Hart; Make Me Feel by Janelle Monáe choreo. by Samuel Chouinard; The Blower's Daughter by Damien Rice; Believer by Imagine Dragons choreo. by Samuel Chouinard
2016–2017	Blues: Feeling Good performed by Nina Simone; Hip Hop: hip hop medley by various artists	"Love" medley: I Wanna Dance with Somebody by Bootstraps; Can't Help Falling in Love by Ingrid Michaelson; Earned It by Bootstraps	Stand by Me covered by Florence + the Machine; Believer by Imagine Dragons choreo. by Samuel Chouinard; Qué has hecho con mi vida by Eva Ruiz; Slip by Elliot Moss
2015–2016	Waltz: Hallelujah performed by k.d. lang; March: Hallelujah March by Karl Hugo	Adagio for Tron (from Tron: Legacy) by Daft Punk	Slip by Elliot Moss; You Can Leave Your Hat On; I Put a Spell on You performed by Joe Cocker
2014–2015	Flamenco: Fiesta flamenca by Monty Kelly; Paso doble: España cañí by Pascual Marquina Narro performed by 101 Strings	The Great Gatsby: Young and Beautiful by Lana Del Rey; Back to Black by Beyoncé and André 3000; A Little Party Never Killed Nobody by Fergie	Down the Road; Happy by C2C; Lay Me Down by Sam Smith
2013–2014	Mr. Pinstripe Suit; Maddest kind of love; Diga Diga Doo by Big Bad Voodoo Daddy	Nocturne Into Bohemian Rhapsody by Lucia Micarelli	Bang Bang by Nico Vega; Hide and Seek by Imogen Heap; Whatcha Say by Jason Derulo
2012–2013	Titanic: by James Horner: Waltz; John Ryan's Polka	Farrucas; Un Amor; Malagueña by Ernesto Lecuona	A Thousand Years by Christina Perri
2011–2012	Latin medley	I Put a Spell on You by Joe Cocker	Make You Feel My Love by Adele

=== With Gilles ===
Season	Original dance	Free dance
2009–2010	Thank God I'm a Country Boy; Take Me Home, Country Roads by John Denver; The Devil Went Down to Georgia by the Charlie Daniels Band; Flamenco medley by The Gypsy Queens, Gipsy Kings	Alfred Hitchcock movies: The Man Who Knew Too Much; Vertigo Suite; North by Northwest Overture by Bernard Herrmann
2008–2009	Go Daddy-O by Big Bad Voodoo Daddy; Flat Foot Floogie by Yallopin' Hounds Orchestra; Sing, Sing, Sing by James Horner	Magalenha by Sérgio Mendes; Bésame Mucho performed by Michel Petrucciani, Graffiti Quartet; Pontero en Libertad by Monica Naranja

== Competitive highlights ==
- GP – Event of the ISU Grand Prix Series
- JGP – Event of the ISU Junior Grand Prix Series
- CS – Event of the ISU Challenger Series
- C – Event was cancelled

=== Ice dance with Madison Hubbell ===
Competition placements at senior level
Season	2011–12	2012–13	2013–14	2014–15	2015–16	2016–17	2017–18	2018–19	2019–20	2020–21	2021–22
Winter Olympics							4th				3rd
Winter Olympics (Team event)											1st
World Championships	10th			10th	6th	9th	2nd	3rd	C	2nd	2nd
Four Continents Championships	5th		1st		4th	4th		4th	3rd		
Grand Prix Final					6th	5th	4th	1st	3rd		C
U.S. Championships	3rd	4th	4th	3rd	3rd	3rd	1st	1st	2nd	1st	2nd
World Team Trophy								1st (3rd)			
GP France		4th		3rd	1st	2nd					
GP Italy											2nd
GP NHK Trophy					3rd		2nd				
GP Skate America	6th		4th			2nd		1st	1st	1st	1st
GP Skate Canada		5th	3rd	3rd			3rd	1st	2nd		
CS Finlandia Trophy		3rd				2nd					
CS Golden Spin of Zagreb				1st							
CS U.S. Classic					1st	1st	1st	1st			1st
Nebelhorn Trophy	1st		1st								

=== Ice dance with Alissandra Aronow ===
Competition placements at senior level
Season	2010–11
U.S. Championships	11th

=== Ice dance with Piper Gilles ===
Competition placements at junior level
Season	2008–09	2009–10
World Junior Championships		9th
JGP Czech Republic	1st	
JGP Germany		3rd
JGP Hungary		4th
JGP South Africa	2nd	
U.S. Championships	3rd	3rd

== Detailed results ==
=== Ice dance with Madison Hubbell ===
ISU personal best scores in the +5/-5 GOE System
Segment	Type	Score	Event
Total	TSS	222.39	2022 World Championships
Rhythm dance	TSS	89.72	2022 World Championships
Rhythm dance	TES	50.95	2022 World Championships
Rhythm dance	PCS	38.77	2022 World Championships
Free dance	TSS	132.67	2022 World Championships
Free dance	TES	74.37	2022 World Championships
Free dance	PCS	58.33	2022 Winter Olympics

ISU personal bests in the +3/-3 GOE System (from 2010–11)
Segment	Type	Score	Event
Total	TSS	196.64	2018 World Championships
Short dance	TSS	80.42	2018 World Championships
Short dance	TES	43.11	2018 World Championships
Short dance	PCS	37.31	2018 World Championships
Free dance	TSS	116.22	2018 World Championships
Free dance	TES	59.68	2018 World Championships
Free dance	PCS	56.54	2018 World Championships

- Small medals for the short program and free skating are only awarded at ISU Championships.
- At national events in the United States, pewter medals are awarded for fourth place.
- Medals at team events are awarded for the team results only. Individual placements at team events are listed in parentheses.

Results in the 2011–12 season
Date	Event	SD		FD		Total	
Date	Event	P	Score	P	Score	P	Score
Sep 21–24, 2011	(Germany) 2011 Nebelhorn Trophy	2	54.82	1	84.19	1	139.01
Oct 21–23, 2011	(United States) 2011 Skate America	6	49.71	3	81.33	6	131.04
Jan 22–29, 2012	(United States) 2012 U.S. Championships	3	57.56	3	94.04	3	151.60
Feb 7–12, 2012	(United States) 2012 Four Continents Championships	5	49.93	5	79.27	5	129.20
Mar 26 – Apr 1, 2012	(France) 2012 World Championships	8	59.56	10	84.39	10	143.95

Results in the 2012–13 season
Date	Event	SD		FD		Total	
Date	Event	P	Score	P	Score	P	Score
Oct 4–7, 2012	(Finland) 2012 Finlandia Trophy	3	58.44	3	91.86	3	150.30
Oct 26–28, 2012	2012 Skate Canada International	4	54.84	6	80.32	5	135.16
Nov 15–18, 2012	(France) 2012 Trophée Éric Bompard	4	56.54	2	88.69	4	145.23
Jan 20–27, 2013	(United States) 2013 U.S. Championships	4	67.75	4	100.11	4	167.86

Results in the 2013–14 season
Date	Event	SD		FD		Total	
Date	Event	P	Score	P	Score	P	Score
Sep 26–28, 2013	(Germany) 2013 Nebelhorn Trophy	2	56.53	1	90.58	1	147.11
Oct 18–20, 2013	(United States) 2013 Skate America	4	60.71	4	92.27	4	152.98
Oct 24–27, 2013	2013 Skate Canada International	3	60.92	3	92.28	3	153.20
Jan 5–12, 2014	(United States) 2014 U.S. Championships	4	66.69	4	101.58	4	168.27
Jan 20–25, 2014	(Taiwan) 2014 Four Continents Championships	2	61.05	1	97.20	1	158.25

Results in the 2014–15 season
Date	Event	SD		FD		Total	
Date	Event	P	Score	P	Score	P	Score
Oct 31 – Nov 2, 2014	2014 Skate Canada International	3	59.29	3	88.94	3	148.23
Nov 21–23, 2014	(France) 2014 Trophée Éric Bompard	3	60.19	3	91.92	3	152.11
Dec 4–6, 2014	(Croatia) 2014 CS Golden Spin of Zagreb	2	66.40	1	100.34	1	166.74
Jan 18–25, 2015	(United States) 2015 U.S. Championships	3	65.43	3	99.31	3	164.74
Mar 23–29, 2015	(China) 2015 World Championships	11	61.43	10	95.13	10	156.56

Results in the 2015–16 season
Date	Event	SD		FD		Total	
Date	Event	P	Score	P	Score	P	Score
Sep 16–20, 2015	(United States) 2015 CS U.S. International Classic	1	61.08	1	92.54	1	153.62
Nov 13–15, 2015	(France) 2015 Trophée Éric Bompard	1	64.45	–	–	1	–
Nov 26–29, 2015	(Japan) 2015 NHK Trophy	2	66.57	3	100.92	3	167.49
Dec 10–13, 2015	(Spain) 2015–16 Grand Prix Final	5	66.21	6	96.99	6	163.20
Jan 15–24, 2016	(United States) 2016 U.S. Championships	3	71.10	3	107.71	3	178.81
Feb 16–21, 2016	(Taiwan) 2016 Four Continents Championships	3	69.36	3	102.93	4	172.29
Mar 28 – Apr 3, 2016	(United States) 2016 World Championships	7	68.44	6	108.37	6	176.81

Note: The 2015 Trophée Éric Bompard was cancelled after the November 2015 Paris attacks. The short programs had been completed on November 13, but the free skating was to be held the next day. On November 23, the International Skating Union announced that the short program results would be considered as the final results for the competition.

Results in the 2016–17 season
Date	Event	SD		FD		Total	
Date	Event	P	Score	P	Score	P	Score
Sep 14–18, 2016	(United States) 2016 CS U.S. International Classic	1	64.82	1	102.08	1	166.90
Oct 6–10, 2016	(Finland) 2016 CS Finlandia Trophy	2	65.31	2	100.45	2	165.76
Oct 21–23, 2016	(United States) 2016 Skate America	3	68.78	2	106.99	2	175.77
Nov 10–13, 2016	2016 Trophée de France	3	66.77	2	107.81	2	174.58
Dec 8–11, 2016	(France) 2016–17 Grand Prix Final	5	72.47	6	107.12	5	179.59
Jan 14–22, 2017	(United States) 2017 U.S. Championships	3	79.72	3	111.70	3	191.42
Feb 15–19, 2017	(South Korea) 2017 Four Continents Championships	4	73.79	6	107.03	4	180.82
Mar 29 – Apr 2, 2017	(Finland) 2017 World Championships	3	76.53	10	101.17	9	177.70

Results in the 2017–18 season
Date	Event	SD		FD		Total	
Date	Event	P	Score	P	Score	P	Score
Sep 13–17, 2017	(United States) 2017 CS U.S. International Classic	1	71.15	1	107.65	1	178.80
Oct 27–29, 2017	2017 Skate Canada International	3	76.08	2	113.35	3	189.43
Nov 10–12, 2017	(Japan) 2017 NHK Trophy	2	76.31	2	112.04	2	188.35
Dec 7–10, 2017	(Japan) 2017–18 Grand Prix Final	4	74.81	4	112.59	4	187.40
Jan 5–7, 2018	(United States) 2018 U.S. Championships	2	79.10	2	118.02	1	197.12
Feb 19–20, 2018	(South Korea) 2018 Winter Olympics	3	77.75	5	109.94	4	187.69
March 21–24, 2018	(Italy) 2018 World Championships	2	80.42	2	116.22	2	196.64

Results in the 2018–19 season
Date	Event	RD		FD		Total	
Date	Event	P	Score	P	Score	P	Score
Sep 12–16, 2018	(United States) 2018 CS U.S. International Classic	1	79.11	1	118.31	1	197.42
Oct 19–21, 2018	(United States) 2018 Skate America	1	78.43	1	122.39	1	200.82
Oct 26–28, 2018	2018 Skate Canada International	1	80.49	2	120.27	1	200.76
Dec 6–9, 2018	(Canada) 2018–19 Grand Prix Final	1	80.53	1	124.82	1	205.35
Jan 19–27, 2019	(United States) 2019 U.S. Championships	1	84.56	1	131.32	1	215.88
Feb 7–10, 2019	(United States) 2019 Four Continents Championships	1	81.95	4	119.71	4	201.66
Mar 18–24, 2019	(Japan) 2019 World Championships	4	83.09	3	127.31	3	210.40
Apr 11–14, 2019	(Japan) 2019 World Team Trophy	3	82.86	3	127.11	1 (3)	–

Results in the 2019–20 season
Date	Event	RD		FD		Total	
Date	Event	P	Score	P	Score	P	Score
Oct 18–20, 2019	(United States) 2019 Skate America	1	84.97	2	124.58	1	209.55
Oct 25–27, 2019	2019 Skate Canada International	1	83.21	2	123.10	2	206.31
Dec 4–8, 2019	(Italy) 2019–20 Grand Prix Final	2	82.72	3	125.21	3	207.93
Jan 20–26, 2020	(United States) 2020 U.S. Championships	2	86.31	2	130.88	2	217.19
Feb 4–9, 2020	(South Korea) 2020 Four Continents Championships	1	85.95	3	122.77	3	208.72

Results in the 2020–21 season
Date	Event	RD		FD		Total	
Date	Event	P	Score	P	Score	P	Score
Oct 23–24, 2020	(United States) 2020 Skate America	1	85.30	1	126.09	1	211.39
Jan 11–21, 2021	(United States) 2021 U.S. Championships	2	89.66	1	134.90	1	224.56
Mar 22–28, 2021	(Sweden) 2021 World Championships	2	86.05	3	128.66	2	214.71

Results in the 2021–22 season
Date	Event	RD		FD		Total	
Date	Event	P	Score	P	Score	P	Score
Sep 15–18, 2021	(United States) 2021 U.S. International Classic	1	84.06	1	123.24	1	207.30
Oct 22–24, 2021	(United States) 2021 Skate America	1	83.58	1	125.96	1	209.54
Nov 5–7, 2021	(Italy) 2021 Gran Premio d'Italia	2	84.79	2	123.11	2	207.90
Jan 3–9, 2022	(United States) 2022 U.S. Championships	2	89.39	1	136.20	2	225.59
Feb 4–7, 2022	(China) 2022 Winter Olympics (Team event)	2	89.39	–	–	1	–
Feb 12–14, 2022	(China) 2022 Winter Olympics	3	87.13	3	130.89	3	218.02
Mar 21–27, 2022	(France) 2022 World Championships	2	89.72	2	132.67	2	222.39

=== Ice dance with Alissandra Aronow ===
Results in the 2010–11 season
Date	Event	RD		FD		Total	
Date	Event	P	Score	P	Score	P	Score
Jan 22–30, 2011	(United States) 2011 U.S. Championships	11	40.84	11	64.52	11	105.36
