= Becky Bereswill =

American figure skater (born 1990)

Becky Bereswill Jackson
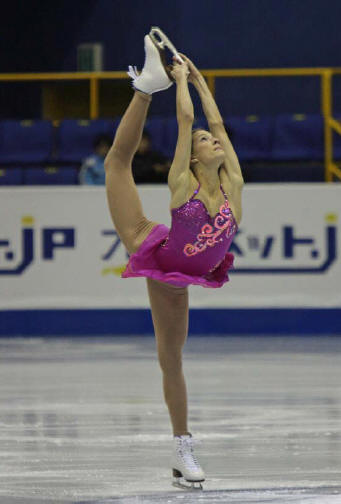
- Bereswill performs a Biellmann spin at the 2008 Junior Grand Prix Final.

Personal information
- Full name: Rebecca Bereswill Jackson
- Other names: Becky
- Born: October 2, 1990 (age 36) Houston, Texas, U.S.
- Height: 5 ft 6 in (1.68 m)

Figure skating career
- Country: United States
- Discipline: Women's singles
- Began skating: 1997
Junior Grand Prix Final
Gold medal – first place	2008–09 Gdańsk	Singles

Rebecca Ann "Becky" Bereswill (born October 2, 1990) is an American figure skater. She is the 2008 Junior Grand Prix Final champion. In 2014, she was cast as Elsa in the Disney on Ice version of Frozen.

== Personal life ==
Rebecca Bereswill Jackson, nicknamed Becky, was born in 1990 in Houston, Texas. She is the elder of identical twins; her twin sister, Allison, is also a figure skater and track and field athlete.

Bereswill studied ballet with the Houston Ballet from age four to thirteen and appeared in a local production of The Nutcracker and Sleeping Beauty.

She attended pre-school through middle school at The Post Oak School in Bellaire, Texas, and then went next door to high school at the Episcopal High School in Bellaire, Texas. She graduated summa cum laude in 2009 and currently attends the University of Michigan in Ann Arbor, Michigan.

== Figure skating career ==
Bereswill began skating at age seven with her sister. She competed on the regional and sectional level in the United States for many years. In the 2003–04 season, competing on the novice level, she won the silver medal at her regional championships to qualify for the sectional championships, where she placed 12th. The following season, she remained on the novice level and again won the silver medal at her regional championship to advance to sectionals, where she moved up from the previous year to place 7th. She moved up to the junior level in the 2005–06 season and qualified for sectionals, where she placed 5th and missed qualifying for the national championships by one placement. In the 2006–07 season, remaining on the junior level, she again qualified for her sectional championship, where she placed 8th on the junior level.

In the 2007–08 season, having moved up to the senior level, Bereswill won her regional championship and won the silver medal at her sectional championship to qualify for the United States Figure Skating Championships for the first time in her career. At the 2008 United States Figure Skating Championships, she placed 10th on the senior level. Following the national championships, she made her senior international debut at the AEGON Challenge Cup spring competition in The Hague, Netherlands and won the bronze medal.

In the 2008–09 season, she made her junior international debut. She won the silver medal at both her events on the 2008–09 ISU Junior Grand Prix circuit in Courcheval, France and Madrid, Spain. She qualified for the 2008–2009 ISU Junior Grand Prix Final in Seoul, Korea. At the Final, she won the gold medal overall by placing fourth in the short program and second in the free skate. She is the last American to win this title. At the 2009 U.S. Championships, Bereswill placed 18th and was not placed on the U.S. team to the 2009 World Junior Championships. During the 2009-10 season, she competed at the 2010 Finlandia Trophy and NHK Grand Prix in Nagano, Japan.

In May 2010, Bereswill began training in pair skating, teaming up with Trevor Young. They finished 10th at the 2011 U.S. Championships and parted ways in March 2011.

During the 2012-13 season, Bereswill won the Eastern Great Lakes Championship and won silver at the 2013 Midwestern Championships to qualify for the 2013 U.S. Championships in Omaha, Nebraska. In 2014, she was cast as Elsa in the Disney On Ice version of Frozen.

== Programs ==
=== Single skating ===
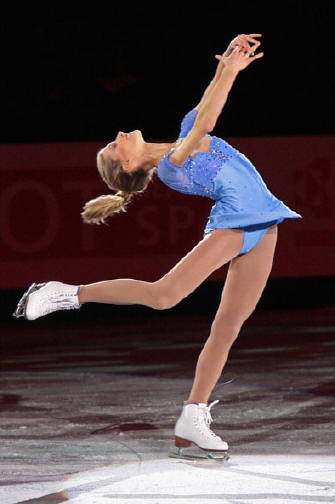
Bereswill performs a layback spin during her Tiny Dancer exhibition program at the 2008 JGP Final.

Season	Short program	Free skating	Exhibition
2009–2010	The Red Violin by John Corigliano	Nessun dorma by Puccini performed by the BBC Concert Orchestra	
2008–2009	Carousel Waltz by Richard Rodgers and Oscar Hammerstein	Nessun dorma by Puccini performed by the BBC Concert Orchestra	Tiny Dancer by Elton John
2007–2008	The Umbrellas of Cherbourg by Michel Legrand	Cinderella by Sergei Prokofiev	

== Competitive highlights ==
=== Single skating ===
Results
International
Event	2007–08	2008–09	2009–10	2012–13
GP NHK Trophy			11th	
AEGON Challenge Cup	3rd			
Finlandia Trophy			12th	
International: Junior
JGP Final		1st		
JGP France		2nd		
JGP Spain		2nd		
National
U.S. Championships	10th	18th	13th	16th

=== Detailed results ===
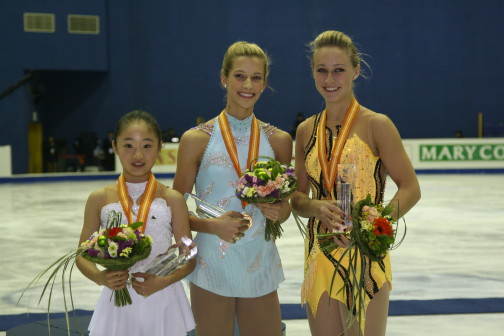
Bereswill (center) with the other medalists at the 2008–09 Junior Grand Prix Final.

2009–2010 Season
Date	Event	SP	FS	Total
January 14–24, 2010	2010 United States Figure Skating Championships	15; 44.60	13; 83.36	13; 127.96
November 5–8, 2009	2009 NHK Trophy	12; 36.26	8; 82.16	11; 118.42
October 8–11, 2009	2009 Finlandia Trophy	12; 45.06	13; 72.05	12; 117.11

- SP = Short program; FS = Free skating

2008–2009 Season
Date	Event	Level	SP	FS	Total
January 18–25, 2009	2009 United States Figure Skating Championships	Senior	17; 46.25	18; 78.32	18; 124.57
December 11–14, 2008	2008–2009 ISU Junior Grand Prix Final	Junior	4; 48.68	2; 98.01	1; 146.69
September 24–28, 2008	2008 ISU Junior Grand Prix, Spain	Junior	4; 45.16	2; 82.11	2; 127.27
August 27–31, 2008	2008 ISU Junior Grand Prix, France	Junior	2; 51.74	2; 83.24	2; 134.98

- SP = Short program; FS = Free skating

2007–2008 Season
Date	Event	Level	SP	FS	Total
March 6–8	AEGON Challenge Cup	Senior	2; 48.00	3; 79.08	3; 127.08
January 20 – 27, 2008	2008 United States Figure Skating Championships	Senior	14; 46.52	10; 91.13	10; 137.65

== Other sources ==
- AEGON Challenge Cup 2008
- 2008–2009 ISU Grand Prix Final
- Track & Field Results Profile
- Cross Country Results Profile
