= Amanda Dobbs =

American figure skater

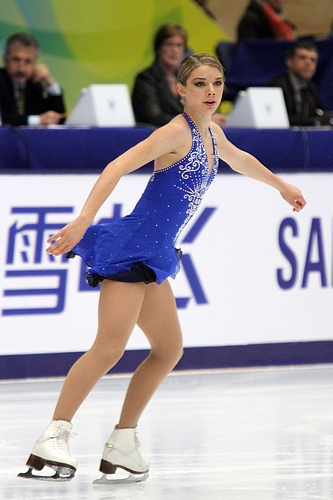

Personal information
- Full name: Amanda J. Dobbs
- Born: August 10, 1993 (age 33) Clovis, California, U.S.
- Home town: Mission Viejo, California, U.S.
- Height: 5 ft 4 in (1.62 m)

Figure skating career
- Country: United States
- Skating club: Peninsula Skating Club
- Began skating: 1996
- Retired: 2011

Amanda J. Dobbs (born August 10, 1993) is an American former competitive figure skater. As a single skater, she placed fourth at the 2010 Four Continents Championships. She also competed in pair skating on the national senior level with Joseph Jacobsen.

== Personal life ==
Dobbs was born in Clovis, California and lives in Mission Viejo, California. She attended Laurel Springs School. Her uncle played for the Texas Rangers.

== Career ==
=== Early career ===
Dobbs began competing in 2003 on the Intermediate level. In 2004, she won the silver medal on the intermediate level at the 2005 Central Pacific Regionals. She also competed in pair skating with Christopher Trefil on the intermediate level. They won the pewter medal at the 2005 U.S. Junior Championships.

She moved up to the novice level for the 2005–2006 season and placed 7th at her regional championship. With Trefil in pairs, she also competed on the novice level. They won the silver medal at their sectional championship and qualified for the 2006 U.S. Figure Skating Championships, where they placed 5th.

In the 2006–2007 season, she remained on the novice level. She won her regional championship and advanced to her sectional championship, where she placed 6th.

In the 2007–2008 season, Dobbs moved up to the junior level. She won her regional championship and won the bronze medal at her sectional championship to qualify for the 2008 U.S. Figure Skating Championships, where she placed 5th. She was assigned to the 2008 International Challenge Cup, where she won the bronze medal.

=== 2008–2009 season ===
In the 2008–2009 season, Dobbs debuted on the ISU Junior Grand Prix circuit. At the 2008–2009 ISU Junior Grand Prix event in Mexico, she won the gold medal and was assigned to a second event by U.S. Figure Skating. At her second event, in South Africa, she won the bronze medal. She qualified in fifth position to the 2008–2009 ISU Junior Grand Prix Final. At the Junior Grand Prix Final, she placed 7th.

By qualifying to the Junior Grand Prix Final, she had earned a bye to the 2009 U.S. Figure Skating Championships. Dobbs competed on the junior level and placed 7th.

Following that season, Dobbs teamed up with Joseph Jacobsen to compete in pair skating while still competing as a single skater.

=== 2009–2010 season ===
In the 2009–2010 season, Dobbs competed in single and pair skating. She made her senior international debut at the 2009 Ice Challenge in Graz and won the bronze medal. The timing of this competition gave her a bye through the regional championships to her sectional championships. At the 2010 Pacific Coast Sectional Figure Skating Championships, held in the fall of 2009, Dobbs qualified for the 2010 U.S. Figure Skating Championships by winning the pewter medals in both the singles event and the pairs event.

At the 2010 U.S. Championships, Dobbs placed 6th in the ladies event, and 7th in the pairs event with Jacobsen.

Because the 2010 Four Continents Figure Skating Championships were held so close to the U.S. Championships, U.S. Figure Skating had submitted possible entries in advance. Dobbs was on the alternate list for Four Continents and was assigned to the event following the 2010 U.S. Championships. Dobbs & Jacobsen were not listed as alternates and so could not have been sent; but were the fourth alternates for the 2010 World Figure Skating Championships.

At the Four Continents Championships, she placed second in the short program with 57.56 points, 1.32 behind Akiko Suzuki. She finished fourth overall.

=== 2010–2011 season ===
Dobbs was assigned to one senior Grand Prix event, the 2010 Cup of China, and finished sixth.

=== Coaching ===
As of 2020, she coaches out of the Detroit Skating Club.

== Programs ==
=== Singles ===
Season	Short program	Free skating
2010–2011	Moon River (from Breakfast at Tiffany's) by Henry Mancini	Concierto de Aranjuez by Joaquín Rodrigo performed by Ikuko Kawai
2009–2010	The Mission by Ennio Morricone	Concierto de Aranjuez by Joaquín Rodrigo performed by Ikuko Kawai
2008–2009	Warsaw Concerto by Richard Addinsell performed by the Royal Philharmonic Orchestra	Toccata and Fugue by Johann Sebastian Bach performed by Vanessa-Mae
2007–2008	Nocturne/Bohemian Rhapsody by Lucia Micarelli	Spartacus by Aram Khachaturian

=== Pairs with Jacobsen ===
Season	Short program	Free skating
2010–2011		Bohemian Rhapsody by Queen
2009–2010	Leyenda by Vanessa-Mae	Yellow River Piano Concerto by Xian Xinghai performed by the Chinese Philharmonic Orchestra

=== Pairs with Trefil ===
Season	Short program	Free skating
2005–2006	The Firebird by Igor Stravinsky	Kalinka by Ivan Larionov

== Competitive highlights ==
GP: Grand Prix; JGP: Junior Grand Prix

=== Ladies' singles ===
International
Event	07–08	08–09	09–10	10–11
Four Continents			4th	
GP Cup of China				6th
Finlandia Trophy				5th
Ice Challenge			3rd	
International: Junior
JGP Final		7th		
JGP Mexico		1st		
JGP South Africa		3rd		
Challenge Cup	3rd J			
National
U.S. Champ.	5th J	7th J	6th	

=== Pairs with Jacobsen ===
National
Event	2009–2010
U.S. Championships	7th

== Detailed results ==
Small medals for short and long programs awarded only at ISU Championships.

=== Singles career ===
2009–2010 season
Date	Event	Level	SP	FS	Total
January 25–31, 2010	2010 Four Continents Championships	Senior	2; 57.56	5; 100.67	4; 158.23
January 14–24, 2010	2010 U.S. Championships	Senior	6; 56.11	7; 94.61	6; 150.72
2008–2009 season
Date	Event	Level	SP	FS	Total
January 18–25, 2009	2009 U.S. Championships	Junior	7; 43.21	8; 73.31	7; 116.52
December 10–15, 2008	2008–09 Junior Grand Prix Final	Junior	5; 47.48	7; 69.59	7; 117.07
October 8–11, 2008	2008–09 Junior Grand Prix, South Africa	Junior	12; 40.60	1; 88.04	3; 128.64
September 10–14, 2008	2008–09 Junior Grand Prix, Mexico	Junior	1; 50.46	1; 88.98	1; 139.44
2007–2008 season
Date	Event	Level	SP	FS	Total
January 20–27, 2008	2008 U.S. Championships	Junior	6	2	5; 142.76
