= Biellmann spin =

Figure skating spin position

The Biellmann spin is a difficult variation of the layback spin in figure skating. It was made popular by world champion Denise Biellmann.

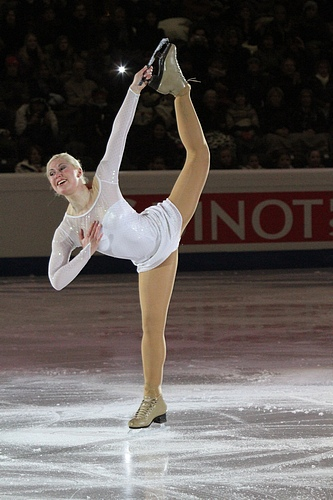
Denise Biellmann performing her namesake spin in 2011.

== Description ==
Figure skating element
- Element name: Biellmann spin
- Element type: Upright spin
- Named for: Denise Biellmann

The Biellmann spin is a difficult variation of the upright spin in figure skating. It is executed by the skater reaching back over their shoulder, grabbing the blade on their free foot, and raising it over their head. The spin demands high levels of strength and flexibility. The Biellmann increases the complexity of a skater's short or free program only if they execute eight revolutions, in either a backward and/or sideway position without any changes, before attempting the Biellmann, and if they clearly increase the speed of the spin. Advanced novice skaters must complete six revolutions before executing a Biellmann spin.

The Biellmann spin was made popular by world champion Denise Biellmann. Russian figure skater Irina Slutskaya invented and was noted for the double Biellmann spin with a foot change, which is executed by the skater reaching back with their hands, grabbing the blade of one skate and pulling it straight over their head, and then performing the same action with the other skate.

== Photo gallery ==
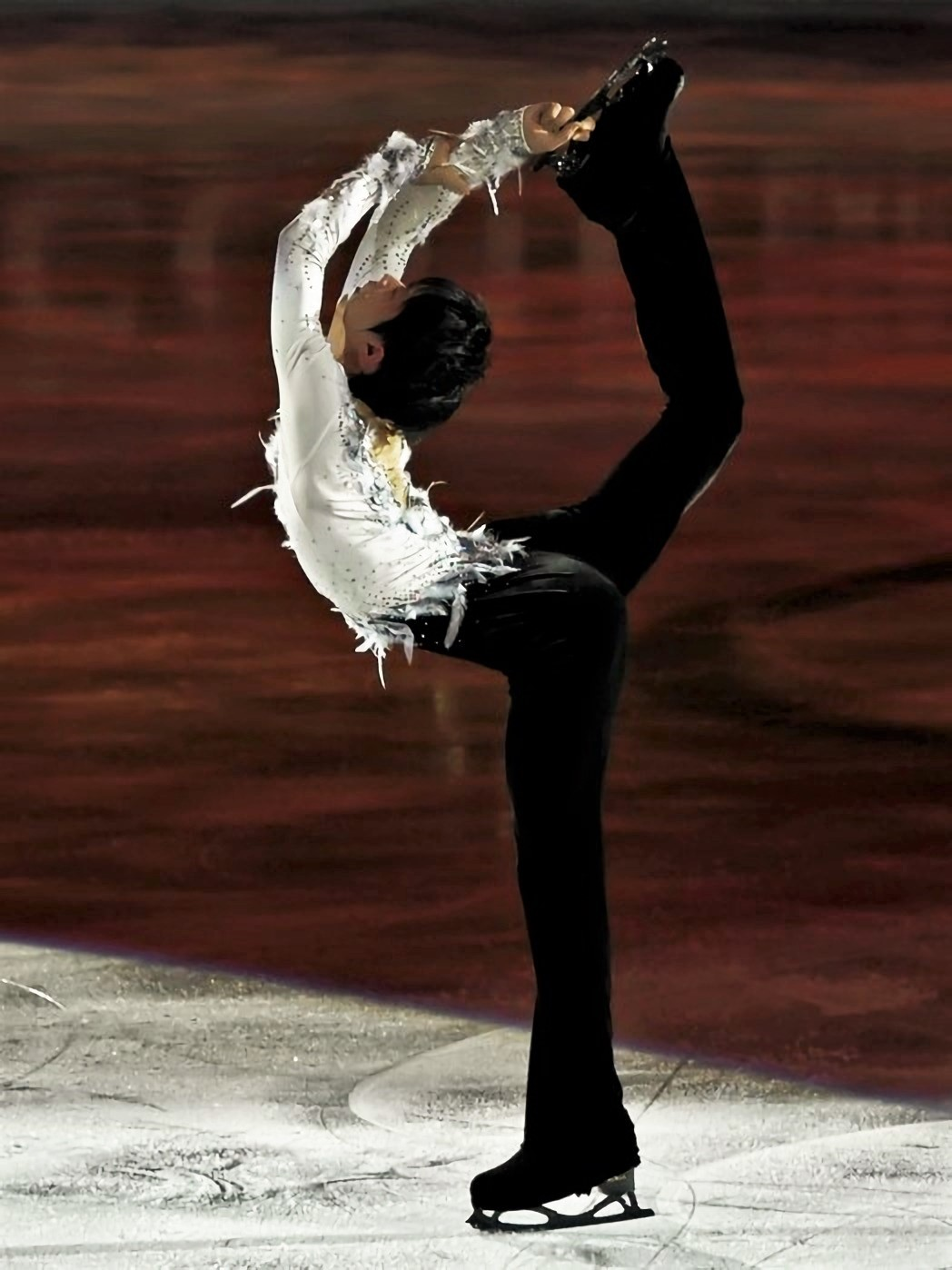
Yuzuru Hanyu, 2019

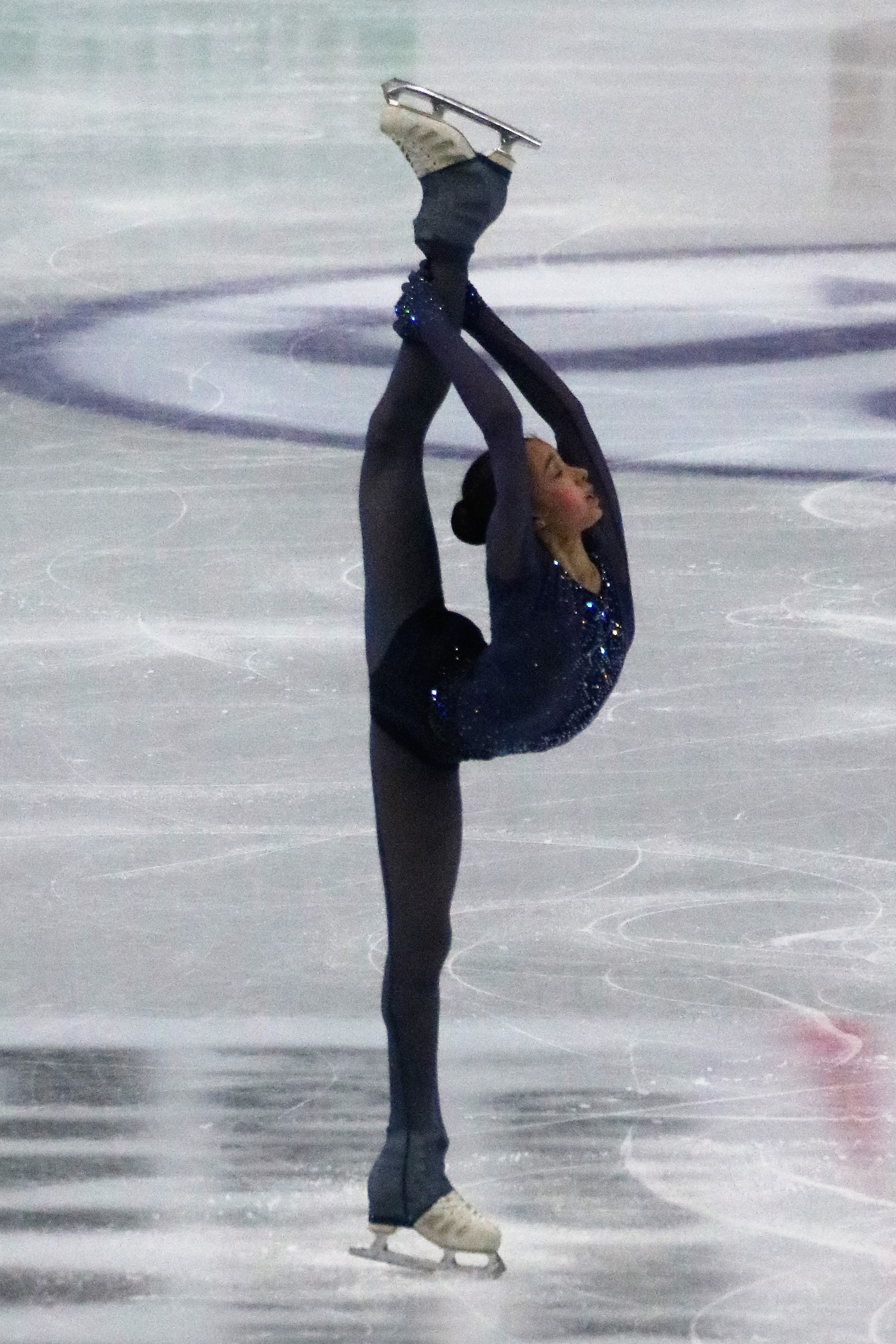
Needle variation of the Biellmann
(Kamila Valieva, 2019)

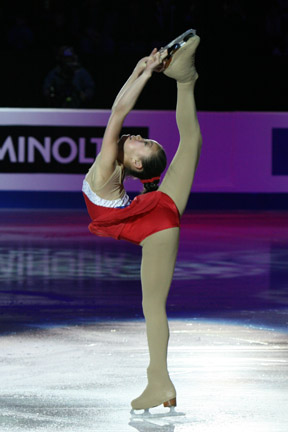
Hyper-extended Biellmann
(Caroline Zhang, 2008)

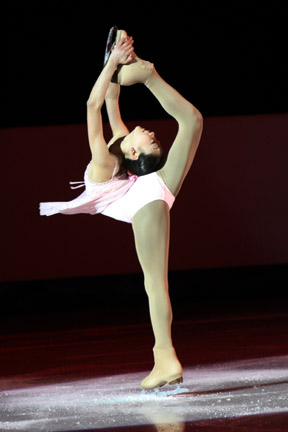
Variation with the hands on the boot instead of on the skate blade
(Mirai Nagasu, 2008)

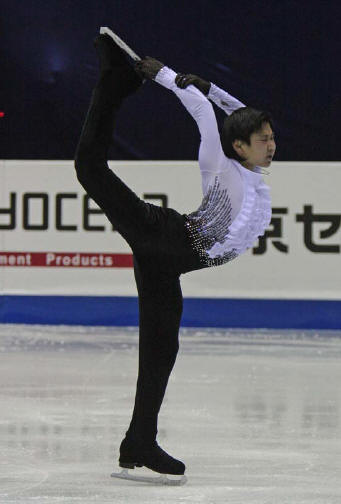
(Denis Ten, 2008)

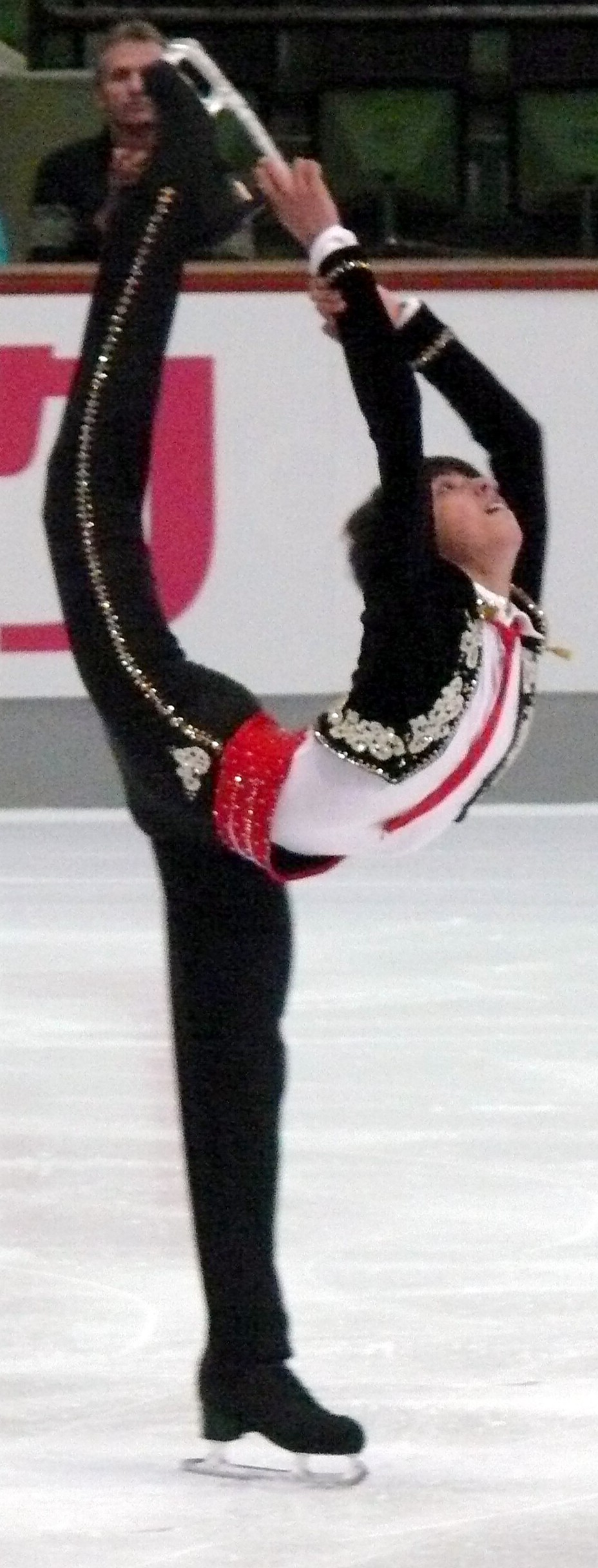
(Michael Christian Martinez, 2013)

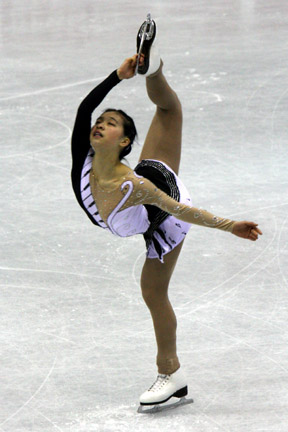
A one-handed Biellmann
(Mira Leung, 2008)

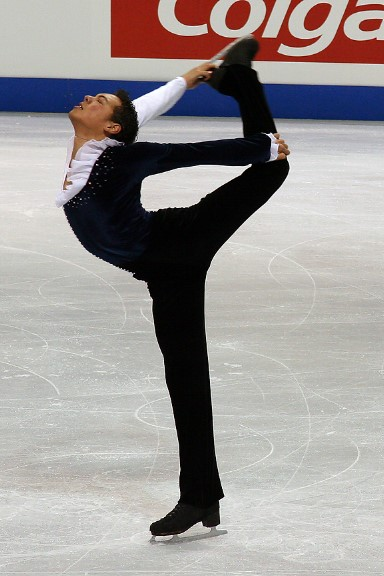
A half-Biellmann
(Jamal Othman, 2006)

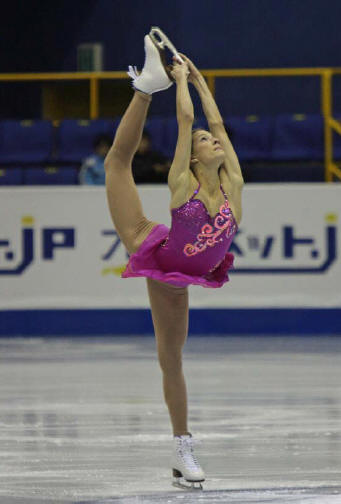
(Becky Bereswill, 2008)

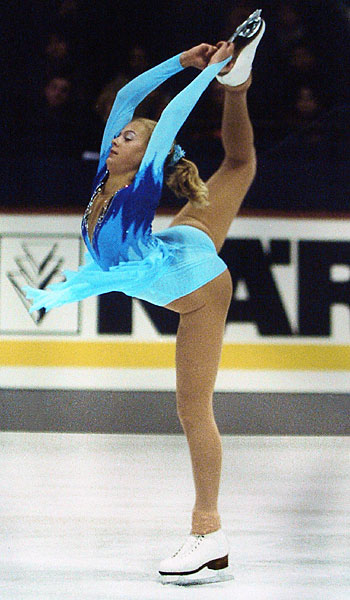
(Zoya Douchine, 2001)

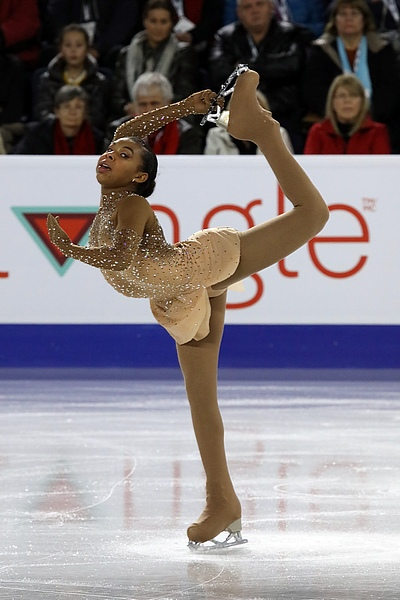
A one-handed Biellmann
(Starr Andrews, 2018)

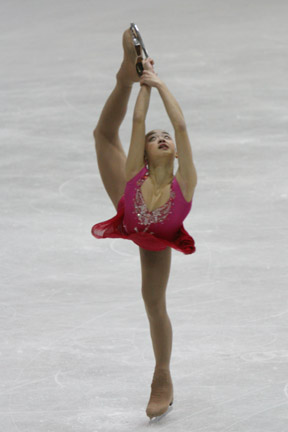
(Yuki Nishino, 2008)

== Works cited ==
- "Technical Panel Handbook: Pair Skating 2025-2026" (PDF). International Skating Union. 25 July 2025. Archived (PDF) from the original on 14 December 2025.
