= Ksenia Ozerova =

Russian former pair skater (born 1991)

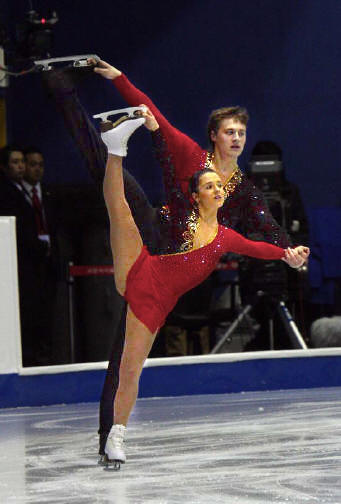
- Ozerova and Enbert in 2008.

Personal information
- Full name: Ksenia Mikhailovna Ozerova
- Born: 24 April 1991 (age 35) Saint Petersburg, Russia
- Height: 1.58 m (5 ft 2 in)

Figure skating career
- Country: Russia
- Skating club: Yubileyny
Medal record
Representing Russia
Figure skating: Pairs
Winter Universiade
Silver medal – second place	2009 Harbin	Pairs

Ksenia Mikhailovna Ozerova (Russian: Ксения Михайловна Озерова; born 24 April 1991) is a Russian former pair skater. With Alexander Enbert, she is the 2009 Winter Universiade silver medalist and won two medals on the ISU Junior Grand Prix series.

== Career ==
Ozerova initially competed with Alexander Enbert, coached by Oksana Kazakova. They won a silver and bronze on the Junior Grand Prix series. This qualified them for the 2008–2009 ISU Junior Grand Prix Final, however they withdrew after the short program.

They made their senior international debut at the 2008 Cup of Russia, where they placed 5th. They were given a berth to the 2009 World Championships after Lubov Iliushechkina and Nodari Maisuradze gave up their spot due to injury. They finished 24th at the event.

The following season, they won silver at Coupe de Nice, finished 8th at Skate Canada International and 6th at Russian senior nationals and split shortly afterward.

Ozerova teamed up with Denis Golubev and finished 11th at 2011 Russian Nationals.

== Programs ==
(with Enbert)

Season	Short program	Free skating
2008–2010	Don Quixote by Ludwig Minkus	Dark Eyes performed by Stanley Black Orchestra

== Competitive highlights ==
=== With Golubev ===
International
Event	2010–11
Winter Universiade	5th
National
Russian Championships	11th

=== With Enbert ===
Results
International
Event	2007–08	2008–09	2009–10
World Championships		24th	
GP Cup of Russia		5th	
GP Skate Canada			8th
Cup of Nice			2nd
Universiade		2nd	
International: Junior
JGP Final		WD	
JGP Belarus		2nd	6th
JGP Czech Republic		3rd	
National
Russian Champ.			6th
Russian Junior Champ.	6th		
GP = Grand Prix; JGP = Junior Grand Prix; WD = Withdrew
