= Alexe Gilles =

American figure skater

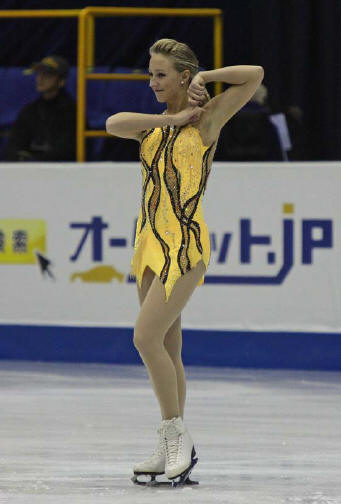
- Gilles at the 2008–2009 Junior Grand Prix Final.

Personal information
- Born: January 16, 1992 (age 34) Rockford, Illinois
- Height: 5 ft 7 in (1.70 m)

Figure skating career
- Country: United States
- Coach: Yuka Sato, Jason Dungjen, David Kinser, Robyn Poe, Tom Zakrajsek, Becky Calvin, Jill Trenary
- Skating club: Broadmoor SC
- Retired: July 25, 2014
Medal record
Representing United States
Figure skating: Ladies' singles
Junior Grand Prix Final
Bronze medal – third place	2008–09 Goyang	Ladies' singles

Alexe Gilles (born January 16, 1992) is an American former competitive figure skater. Gilles is the 2008 Junior Grand Prix Final bronze medalist and the 2008 U.S. national junior champion.

== Personal life ==
Gilles was born in Rockford, Illinois. She graduated from Cheyenne Mountain High School in 2010. She is the sister of Piper Gilles (twin), Todd Gilles, Kemper Gilles and Shelby Gilles.

== Career ==
Gilles began skating at age 2. In 2000, she began working with Tom Zakrajsek and Becky Calvin in Colorado Springs, Colorado.

Gilles competed for two seasons on the JGP circuit and won a bronze medal at the 2008 ISU Junior Grand Prix Final. She also competed for two seasons on the senior Grand Prix series. On March 30, 2011, Gilles announced a coaching change to Yuka Sato and Jason Dungjen in Bloomfield Hills, Michigan.

In 2012, Gilles announced that she would compete for Canada. She finished 13th at the 2013 Canadian Championships. She never appeared for Canada internationally.

Gilles portrays Siren Number 1 and Elsa in Disney on Ice.

== Programs ==
Season	Short program	Free skating
2012–2013	Palm Court Encores	Pas de deux (from The Nutcracker) by Pyotr Tchaikovsky performed by Bonn Classic Philharmonic
2010–2011	Aschenbrödel by Johann Strauss II	Adagio from The Queen Symphony by Tolga Kashif; Nocturne from Bohemian Rhapsody by Paul Schwartz, Freddie Mercury
2009–2010	Aschenbrödel by Johann Strauss II	On the Town by Leonard Bernstein
2008–2009	The Girl with the Flaxen Hair by Claude Debussy, Nigel Hess	Selvatico Album Bongo Madness by Buddy Collette; Softly As in a Morning Sunrise by Henderson and Vallee; Ti Mon Bo; Mambo Beat Lo Mejor de Lo Mejor by Tito Puente
2007–2008	Windspirits by René Dupéré, Elise Vett; Zum Astra by Simon Carpenter	Oceanic by Vangelis

== Competitive highlights ==
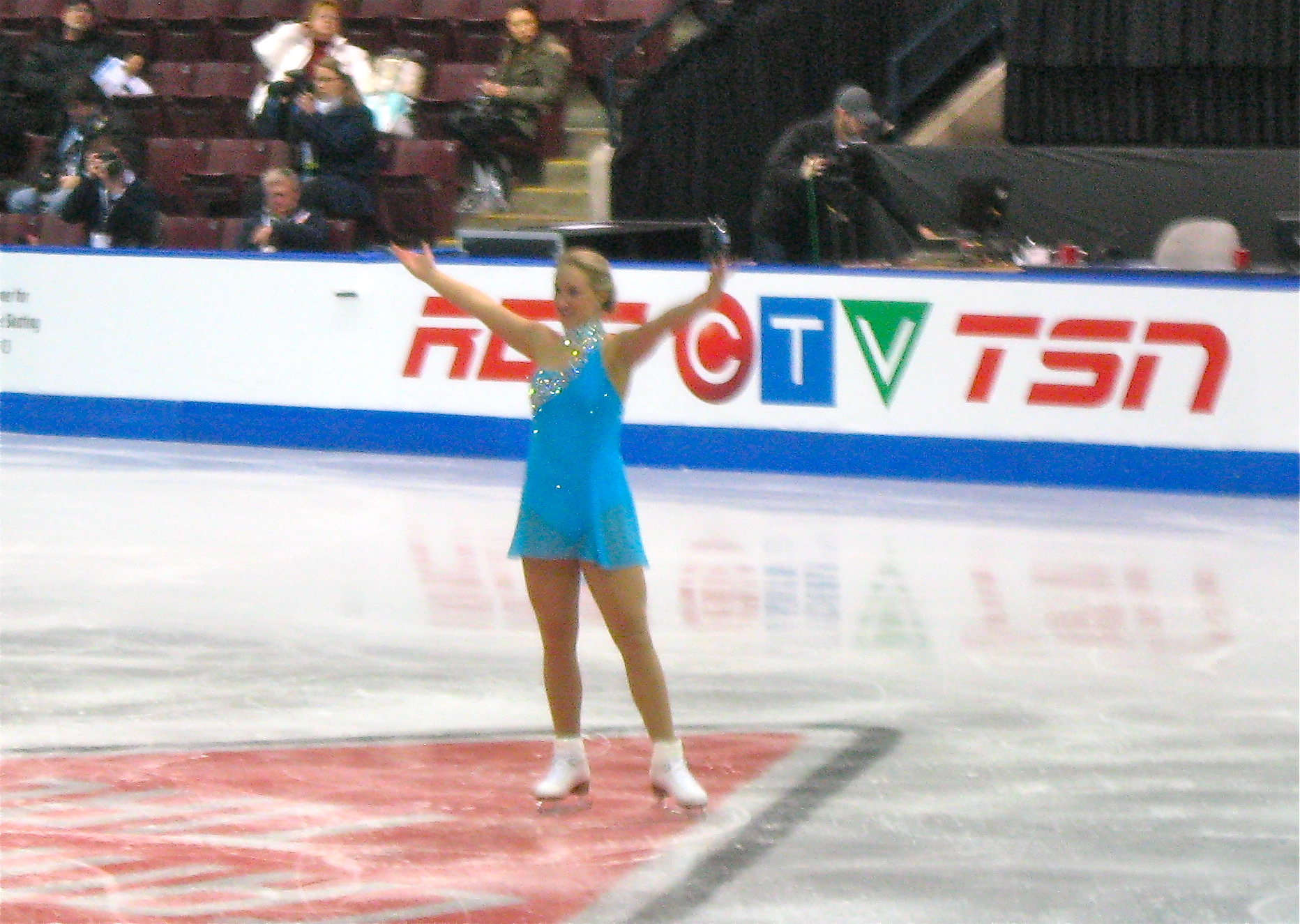
Gilles at the 2013 Canadian Championships.

GP: Grand Prix; JGP: Junior Grand Prix

International
Event	06–07	07–08	08–09	09–10	10–11	11–12	12–13
Four Continents				9th			
GP Bompard				5th			
GP Skate America				10th	12th		
GP Skate Canada					11th		
International: Junior
JGP Final		6th	3rd				
JGP Croatia		4th					
JGP Mexico			2nd				
JGP South Africa			1st				
JGP United States		2nd					
Challenge Cup	2nd J						
National
Canadian Champ.							13th
U.S. Champ.	5th J	1st J	9th	8th	14th		
