= Kristine Musademba =

American figure skater (born 1992)

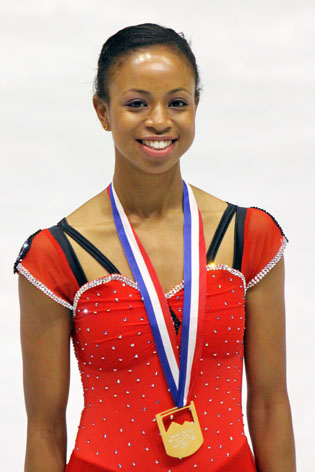
- Musademba in 2009

Personal information
- Full name: Kristine Musademba
- Born: December 3, 1992 (age 33) Washington, D.C.
- Home town: Silver Spring, Maryland
- Height: 5 ft 5 in (1.65 m)

Figure skating career
- Country: United States
- Coach: Derrick Delmore
- Skating club: Washington FSC
- Began skating: 2000
- Retired: 2011

Kristine Musademba (born December 3, 1992) is an American former competitive figure skater. She won three gold medals on the ISU Junior Grand Prix series and qualified twice for the JGP Final. She is the 2008 U.S. junior national pewter medalist.

== Personal life ==
Kristine Musademba's mother is from the Philippines and her father is from Zimbabwe. She attended Columbia College of Columbia University and was in the class of 2015.

== Career ==
Musademba started skating at the age of 7, after accompanying her best friend to the rink. She won the novice silver medal at the 2007 U.S. Championships.

The following season, Musademba received her first ISU Junior Grand Prix assignments, winning silver in Austria and placing fourth in England. Her results qualified her to the JGP Final, where she finished 4th. She then placed fourth on the junior level at the 2008 U.S. Championships.

In the 2008–09 season, Musademba won gold at both of her JGP assignments, France and Spain. She qualified for her second JGP Final and came in 6th. She competed on the senior level at the 2009 U.S. Championships, finishing 11th.

In 2009–10, Musademba won gold in her JGP event in the United States but finished 10th in Croatia. She withdrew from the 2010 U.S. Championships.

Musademba received one senior Grand Prix assignment, the 2010 Cup of China, placing 8th.

== Programs ==
Season	Short program	Free skating	Exhibition
2010–2011	Clair de lune by Claude Debussy	Elizabeth: The Golden Age by Craig Armstrong and A. R. Rahman	
2009–2010	Clair de lune by Claude Debussy	"Africa" - Fantasy for Piano and Orchestra; The Muse and The Poet (French: La Muse et le Poete) by Camille Saint-Saëns	
2008–2009	Within by William Joseph	The Arrival of the Queen of Sheba by George Frideric Handel	Summertime
2007–2008	Exodus by Ernest Gold	Caravan by Duke Ellington	
2006–2007	Walk Like an Egyptian by The Bangles	Malaguena by Raúl Di Blasio	
2005–2006	unknown	Arabian Nights	

== Competitive highlights ==
GP: Grand Prix; JGP: Junior Grand Prix

International
Event	07–08	08–09	09–10	10–11
GP Cup of China				8th
International: Junior or novice
JGP Final	4th	6th		
JGP Austria	2nd			
JGP Croatia			10th	
JGP France		1st		
JGP Spain		1st		
JGP United Kingdom	4th			
JGP United States			1st	
National
U.S. Champ.	4th J	11th	WD	15th
