= Ekaterina Sheremetieva =

Russian former pair skater (born 1991)

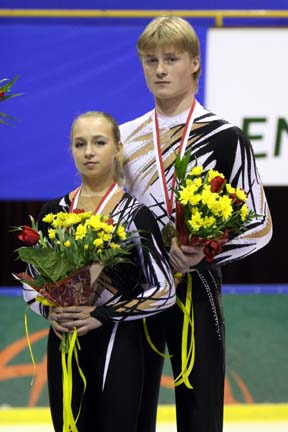
- Sheremetieva/Kuznetsov in 2007

Personal information
- Full name: Ekaterina Alexandrovna Sheremetieva
- Born: 26 August 1991 (age 35) Moscow
- Height: 1.50 m (4 ft 11 in)

Figure skating career
- Country: Russia
- Coach: Nina Mozer
- Skating club: Vorobievie Gory Moscow
- Retired: April 2010
Medal record
Representing Russia
Figure skating: Pairs
Junior Grand Prix Final
Silver medal – second place	2007–08 Gdańsk	Pairs

Ekaterina Alexandrovna Sheremetieva (Russian: Екатерина Александровна Шереметьева; born 26 August 1991) is a Russian former pair skater. With Mikhail Kuznetsov, she is the 2007 ISU Junior Grand Prix Final silver medalist.

== Career ==
Sheremetieva teamed up with Mikhail Kuznetsov in 2003.

Sheremetieva broke her foot in 2006 and, as a result, the pair missed most of the 2006–2007 season. Although they placed third on the day, Sheremetieva/Kuznetsov were later awarded the silver medal from the 2007–08 ISU Junior Grand Prix Final following the retroactive disqualification of Vera Bazarova / Yuri Larionov due to a positive doping sample from Larionov. Sheremetieva/Kuznetsov made their senior international debut at the 2008 Nebelhorn Trophy, placing 5th. They missed part of the 2008–2009 season due to injury. Their partnership ended following that season.

Sheremetieva teamed up with Egor Chudin and competed with him for one season.

== Personal life ==
Sheremetieva's brother is a competitive judoka.

== Programs ==
(with Kuznetsov)

Season	Short program	Free skating
2008–2009	Wild Dances by Ruslana	Nostradamus by Maksim Mrvica
2007–2008	Winter (from Four Seasons) by Antonio Vivaldi	Nostradamus by Maksim Mrvica

== Competitive highlights ==
=== With Chudin ===
International
Event	2009–10
Ondrej Nepela Memorial	2nd
NRW Trophy	4th
National
Russian Championships	8th

=== With Kuznetsov ===
International
Event	2005–06	2006–07	2007–08	2008–09
Nebelhorn Trophy				5th
International: Junior
World Junior Champ.			4th	5th
JGP Final			2nd	
JGP Canada	2nd			
JGP Croatia	4th			
JGP Estonia			1st	
JGP Mexico				2nd
JGP United Kingdom			4th	
National
Russian Champ.		8th		
Russian Junior Champ.	7th		4th	2nd
JGP = Junior Grand Prix
