= ISU Junior Grand Prix in the United States =

International figure skating competition

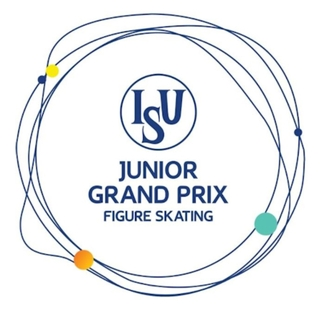
- Status: Inactive
- Genre: ISU Junior Grand Prix
- Frequency: Occasional
- Country: United States
- Inaugurated: 2001
- Most recent: 2019
- Organizer: U.S. Figure Skating

The ISU Junior Grand Prix in the United States is an international figure skating competition sanctioned by the International Skating Union (ISU), organized and hosted by U.S. Figure Skating. It is held periodically as an event of the ISU Junior Grand Prix of Figure Skating (JGP), a series of international competitions exclusively for junior-level skaters. Medals may be awarded in men's singles, women's singles, pair skating, and ice dance. Skaters earn points based on their results at the qualifying competitions each season, and the top skaters or teams in each discipline are invited to then compete at the Junior Grand Prix of Figure Skating Final.

== History ==
The ISU Junior Grand Prix of Figure Skating (JGP) was established by the International Skating Union (ISU) in 1997 and consists of a series of seven international figure skating competitions exclusively for junior-level skaters. The locations of the Junior Grand Prix events change every year. While all seven competitions feature the men's, women's, and ice dance events, only four competitions each season feature the pairs event. Skaters earn points based on their results each season, and the top skaters or teams in each discipline are then invited to compete at the Junior Grand Prix of Figure Skating Final.

Skaters are eligible to compete on the junior-level circuit if they are at least 13 years old before July 1 of the respective season, but not yet 19 (for single skaters), 21 (for men and women in ice dance and women in pair skating), or 23 (for men in pair skating). Competitors are chosen by their respective skating federations. The number of entries allotted to each ISU member nation in each discipline is determined by their results at the prior World Junior Figure Skating Championships.

The United States hosted the 1998 Junior Grand Prix of Figure Skating Final – the culminating event of the Junior Grand Prix series – in Detroit, Michigan. Vincent Restencourt of France won the men's event, Viktoria Volchkova of Russia won the women's event, Julia Obertas and Dmytro Palamarchuk of Ukraine won the pairs event, and Jamie Silverstein and Justin Pekarek of the United States won the ice dance event.

U.S. Figure Skating was scheduled to host the second event of the 2001 Junior Grand Prix Series from September 20 to 23 in Scottsdale, Arizona, but cancelled the competition due to the September 11 terrorist attacks. Scottsdale hosted the third event of the Junior Grand Prix Series in 2002. Andrei Griazev of Russia won the men's event, Akiko Suzuki of Japan won the women's event, Ding Yang and Ren Zhongfei of China won the pairs event, and Nóra Hoffmann and Maxim Zavozin of Hungary won the ice dance event.

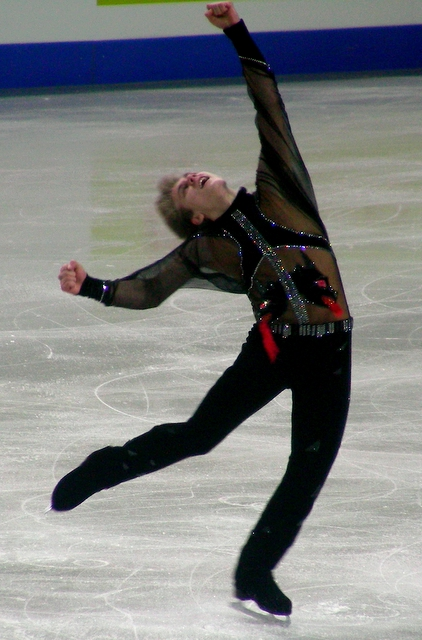
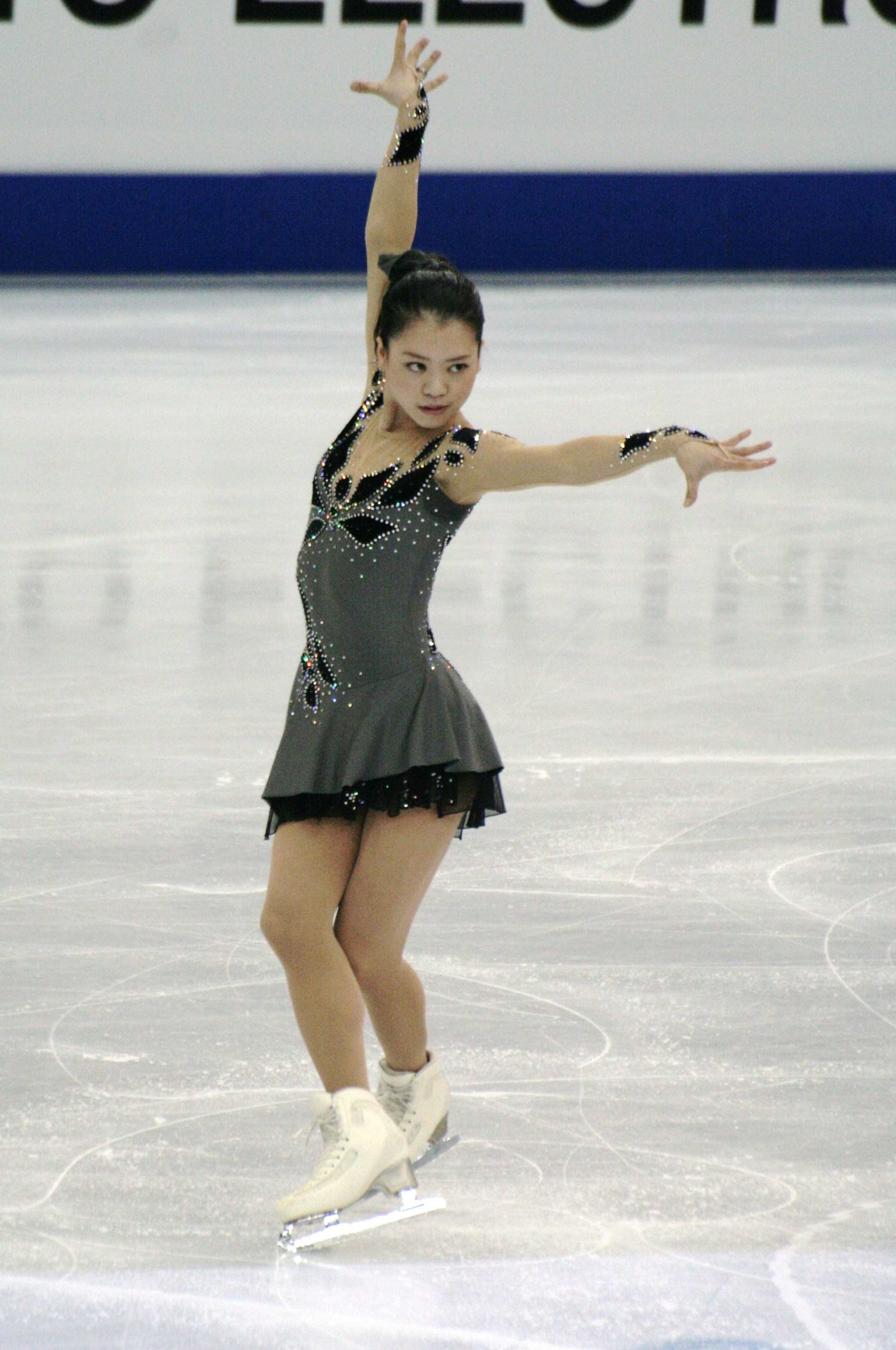
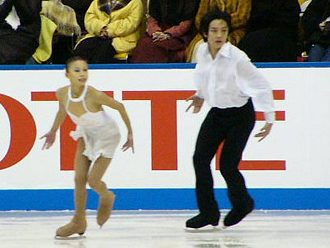
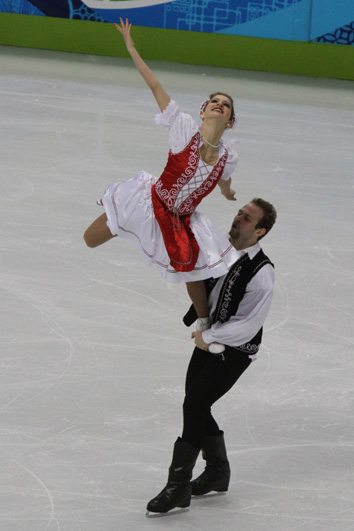
The 2002 Junior Grand Prix in Scottsdale champions: Andrei Griazev of Russia (men's singles); Akiko Suzuki of Japan (women's singles); Ding Yang and Ren Zhongfei of China (pair skating); and Nóra Hoffmann and Maxim Zavozin of Hungary (ice dance)

The event has been held every few years in different cities: Long Beach, California (2004); Lake Placid, New York (2007, 2009, 2012, 2019); and Colorado Springs, Colorado (2015). Its most recent appearance was in Lake Placid in 2019.

== Medalists ==
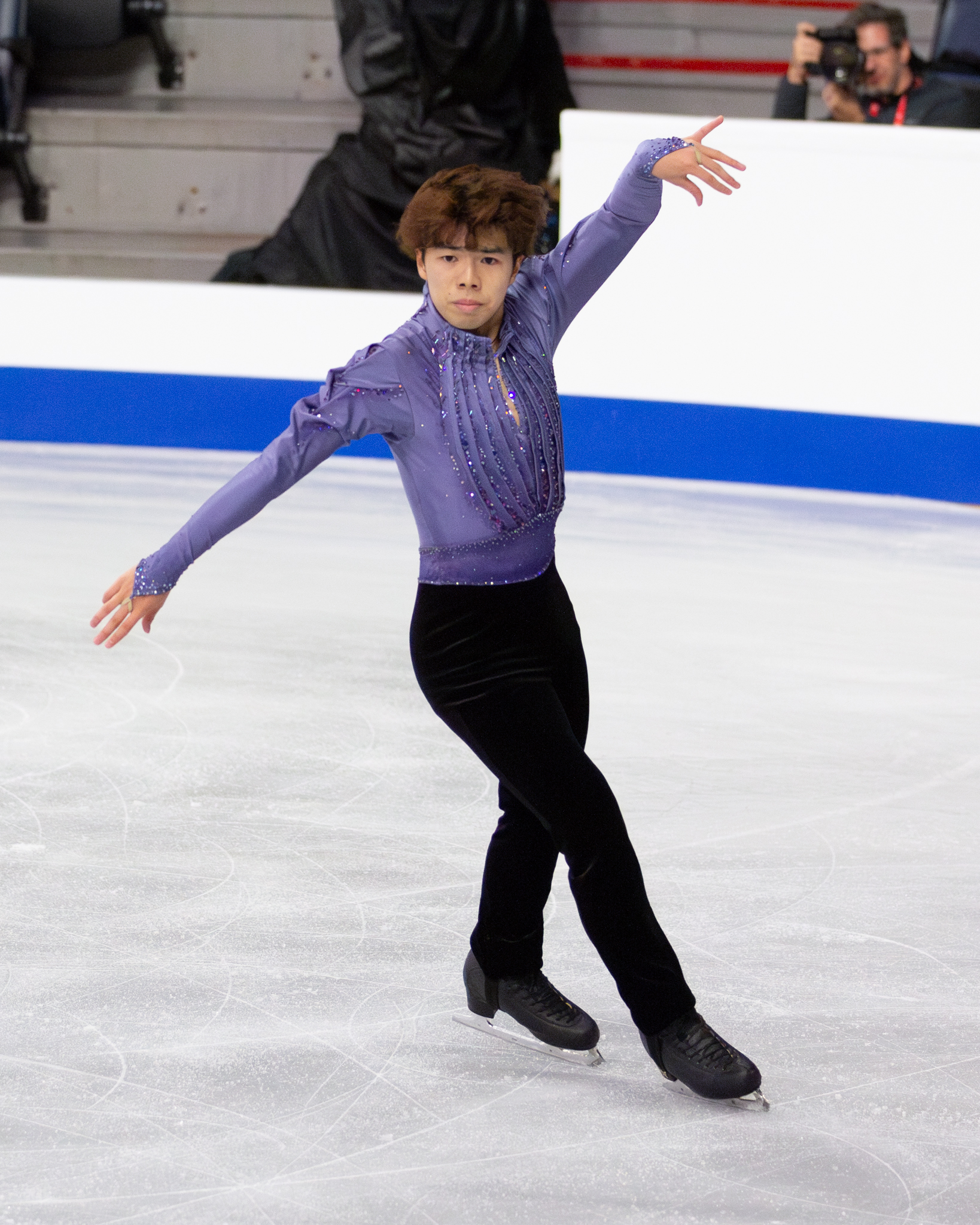
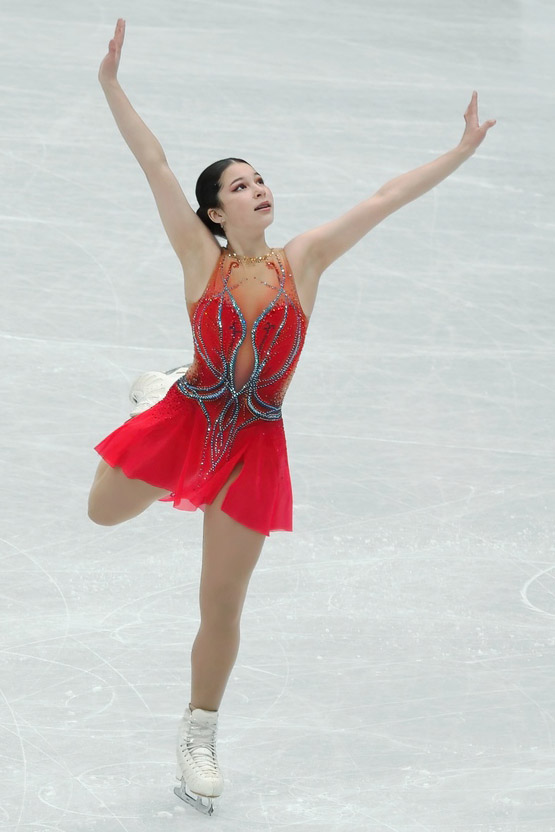
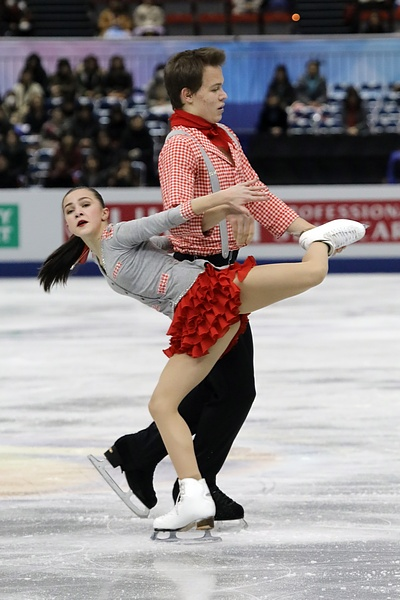
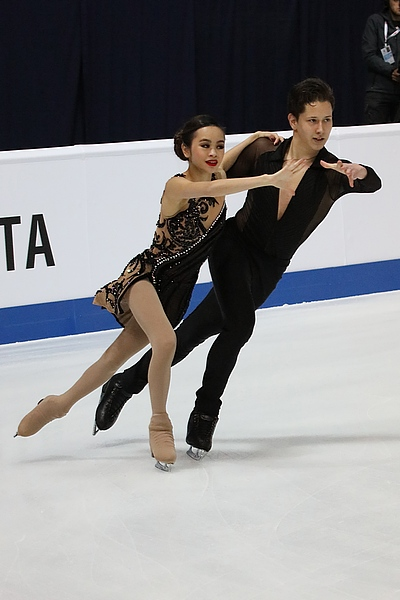
The 2019 Junior Grand Prix in Lake Placid champions: Shun Sato of Japan (men's singles); Alysa Liu of the United States (women's singles); Apollinariia Panfilova and Dmitry Rylov of Russia (pair skating); and Avonley Nguyen and Vadym Kolesnik of the United States (ice dance)

=== Men's singles ===
Men's event medalists
Year	Location	Gold	Silver	Bronze	Ref.
1998 Final	Detroit, Michigan	(France) Vincent Restencourt	(Russia) Ilia Klimkin	(Russia) Alexei Vasilevski	
2001	Scottsdale, Arizona	Competition cancelled due to the September 11 attacks			
2002	Scottsdale, Arizona	(Russia) Andrei Griazev	(United States) Parker Pennington	(Canada) Ken Rose	
2004	Long Beach, California	(United States) Dennis Phan	(Canada) Christopher Mabee	(United States) Princeton Kwong	
2007	Lake Placid, New York	(United States) Armin Mahbanoozadeh	(United States) Austin Kanallakan	(Russia) Artem Grigoriev	
2009	Lake Placid, New York	(United States) Ross Miner	(Japan) Kento Nakamura	(Russia) Mark Shakhmatov	
2012	Lake Placid, New York	(United States) Joshua Farris	(Japan) Keiji Tanaka	(Canada) Roman Sadovsky	
2015	Colorado Springs, Colorado	(United States) Nathan Chen	(Israel) Daniel Samohin	(Japan) Sōta Yamamoto	
2019	Lake Placid, New York	(Japan) Shun Sato	(Canada) Stephen Gogolev	(Russia) Gleb Lutfullin	

=== Women's singles ===
Women's event medalists
Year	Location	Gold	Silver	Bronze	Ref.
1998 Final	Detroit, Michigan	(Russia) Viktoria Volchkova	(United States) Sarah Hughes	(Russia) Daria Timoshenko	
2001	Scottsdale, Arizona	Competition cancelled due to the September 11 attacks			
2002	Scottsdale, Arizona	(Japan) Akiko Suzuki	(United States) Beatrisa Liang	(United States) Felicia Beck	
2004	Long Beach, California	(Japan) Mao Asada	(United States) Kimmie Meissner	(United States) Danielle Kahle	
2007	Lake Placid, New York	(United States) Mirai Nagasu	(United States) Alexe Gilles	(United States) Angela Maxwell	
2009	Lake Placid, New York	(United States) Kristine Musademba	(Russia) Ksenia Makarova	(Sweden) Isabelle Olsson	
2012	Lake Placid, New York	(Japan) Satoko Miyahara	(United States) Courtney Hicks	(United States) Angela Wang	
2015	Colorado Springs, Colorado	(Japan) Yuna Shiraiwa	(Japan) Marin Honda	(United States) Vivian Le	
2019	Lake Placid, New York	(United States) Alysa Liu	(South Korea) Yeonjeong Park	(Russia) Anastasia Tarakanova	

=== Pairs ===
Pairs event medalists
Year	Location	Gold	Silver	Bronze	Ref.
1998 Final	Detroit, Michigan	(Ukraine); Julia Obertas; Dmytro Palamarchuk	(United States); Laura Handy; Paul Binnebose	(Russia); Victoria Maksyuta; Vladislav Zhovnirski	
2001	Scottsdale, Arizona	Competition cancelled due to the September 11 attacks			
2002	Scottsdale, Arizona	(China); Ding Yang; Ren Zhongfei	(United States); Jennifer Don; Jonathon Hunt	(United States); Brittany Vise; Nicholas Kole	
2004	Long Beach, California	(Canada); Jessica Dubé; Bryce Davison	(United States); Aaryn Smith; Will Chitwood	(Canada); Michelle Cronin; Brian Shales	
2007	Lake Placid, New York	(Canada); Olivia Jones; Donald Jackson	(Canada); Carolyn MacCuish; Andrew Evans	(Russia); Anastasia Khodkova; Pavel Sliusarenko	
2009	Lake Placid, New York	(Canada); Kaleigh Hole; Adam Johnson	(Russia); Ksenia Stolbova; Fedor Klimov	(Japan); Narumi Takahashi; Mervin Tran	
2012	Lake Placid, New York	(Canada); Margaret Purdy; Michael Marinaro	(Russia); Vasilisa Davankova; Andrei Deputat	(United States); Madeline Aaron; Max Settlage	
2015	Colorado Springs, Colorado	(Russia); Anastasia Gubanova; Alexei Sintsov	(United States); Joy Weinberg; Maximiliano Fernandez	(Russia); Elena Ivanova; Tagir Khakimov	
2019	Lake Placid, New York	(Russia); Apollinariia Panfilova; Dmitry Rylov	(Russia); Kseniia Akhanteva; Valerii Kolesov	(Russia); Alina Pepeleva; Roman Pleshkov	

=== Ice dance ===
Ice dance event medalists
Year	Location	Gold	Silver	Bronze	Ref.
1998 Final	Detroit, Michigan	(United States); Jamie Silverstein; Justin Pekarek	(Italy); Federica Faiella; Luciano Milo	(Russia); Natalia Romaniuta; Daniil Barantsev	
2001	Scottsdale, Arizona	Competition cancelled due to the September 11 attacks			
2002	Scottsdale, Arizona	(Hungary); Nóra Hoffmann; Attila Elek	(Russia); Olga Orlova; Maxim Bolotin	(United States); Loren Galler-Rabinowitz; David Mitchell	
2004	Long Beach, California	(United States); Morgan Matthews; Maxim Zavozin	(Canada); Siobhan Karam; Joshua McGrath	(Russia); Anastasia Gorshkova; Ilia Tkachenko	
2007	Lake Placid, New York	(United States); Emily Samuelson; Evan Bates	(Canada); Joanna Lenko; Mitchell Islam	(United States); Pilar Bosley; John Corona	
2009	Lake Placid, New York	(United States); Maia Shibutani; Alex Shibutani	(Canada); Kharis Ralph; Asher Hill	(United States); Lauri Bonacorsi; Travis Mager	
2012	Lake Placid, New York	(United States); Alexandra Aldridge; Daniel Eaton	(Russia); Evgenia Kosigina; Nikolai Moroshkin	(Canada); Andréanne Poulin; Marc-André Servant	
2015	Colorado Springs, Colorado	(United States); Lorraine McNamara; Quinn Carpenter	(Canada); Mackenzie Bent; Dmitre Razgulajevs	(Russia); Sofia Polishchuk; Alexander Vakhnov	
2019	Lake Placid, New York	(United States); Avonley Nguyen; Vadym Kolesnik	(Russia); Diana Davis; Gleb Smolkin	(Czech Republic); Natálie Taschlerová; Filip Taschler	
