= 2007 U.S. Figure Skating Championships =

Figure skating competition

- Type: National Championship
- Date: January 21 – 28
- Season: 2006–07
- Location: Spokane, Washington
- Venue: Spokane Arena (main); Spokane Convention Center (secondary)

Champions
- Men's singles: Evan Lysacek
- Ladies' singles: Kimmie Meissner
- Pairs: Brooke Castile / Benjamin Okolski
- Ice dance: Tanith Belbin / Benjamin Agosto
- Previous: 2006 U.S. Championships
- Next: 2008 U.S. Championships

The 2007 U.S. Figure Skating Championships took place between January 21 and 28 at the Spokane Arena and the Spokane Convention Center in Spokane, Washington. Skaters competed in four disciplines – men's singles, ladies' singles, pair skating, and ice dancing – across three levels: senior, junior, and novice. Medals were awarded in four colors: gold (first), silver (second), bronze (third), and pewter (fourth).

The event was used to determine the U.S. teams for the 2007 World Championships, 2007 Four Continents Championships, and 2007 World Junior Championships.

The event was later named the Sports Event of the Year by Sports Travel Magazine.

== Notes ==
- Despite general consensus that the popularity of U.S. figure skating was on the decline, the competition shattered the championships' previous attendance record held by Los Angeles with a crowd of 130,000 in 2002. The new attendance record is now 155,000.

== Senior results ==
=== Men ===
Rank	Name	Total points	SP		FS	
1	Evan Lysacek	248.88	1	78.99	1	169.89
2	Ryan Bradley	219.21	3	73.58	2	145.63
3	Johnny Weir	213.20	2	78.14	4	135.06
4	Jeremy Abbott	200.95	9	64.48	3	136.47
5	Scott Smith	196.59	7	67.01	6	129.58
6	Derrick Delmore	195.09	11	62.49	5	132.60
7	Parker Pennington	192.79	4	68.56	8	124.23
8	Shaun Rogers	190.15	5	67.34	9	122.81
9	Stephen Carriere	189.04	10	64.34	7	124.70
10	Braden Overett	188.47	8	66.58	10	121.89
11	Nicholas LaRoche	179.27	6	67.33	12	111.94
12	Jordan Miller	171.17	13	57.32	11	113.85
13	Dennis Phan	169.59	12	59.54	13	110.05
14	Tommy Steenberg	158.83	16	50.70	14	108.13
15	Daisuke Murakami	157.17	17	49.54	15	107.63
16	Craig Ratterree	151.69	14	55.80	17	95.89
17	Geoffry Varner	150.85	18	47.66	16	103.19
WD	Michael Villarreal	withdrew	15	53.10	withdrew from competition	

=== Ladies ===
Rank	Name	Total points	SP		FS	
1	Kimmie Meissner	181.68	1	65.69	3	115.99
2	Emily Hughes	180.86	3	62.32	2	118.54
3	Alissa Czisny	177.74	5	58.15	1	119.59
4	Beatrisa Liang	167.15	2	62.66	4	104.49
5	Rachael Flatt	159.75	6	56.51	5	103.24
6	Danielle Kahle	143.82	10	48.21	6	95.61
7	Juliana Cannarozzo	143.66	9	49.93	7	93.73
8	Katy Taylor	139.78	4	58.72	12	81.06
9	Michelle Boulos	139.75	11	48.08	8	91.67
10	Christine Zukowski	131.06	7	54.30	15	76.76
11	Megan Oster	130.98	12	46.73	9	84.25
12	Melissa Bulanhagui	130.42	8	52.64	14	77.78
13	Megan Williams-Stewart	128.14	17	44.95	10	83.19
14	Taylor Firth	125.09	19	43.25	11	81.84
15	Kylie Gleason	123.94	15	46.04	13	77.90
16	Erin Reed	120.98	14	46.53	18	74.45
17	Margaret Wang	120.65	16	45.00	17	75.65
18	Becky Hughes	119.41	13	46.72	20	72.69
19	Megan Hyatt	119.09	20	43.11	16	75.98
20	Angie Lien	115.44	18	44.72	21	70.72
21	Ambar Kaiser	112.29	21	37.95	19	74.34

=== Pairs ===
Rank	Name	Total points	SP		FS	
1	Brooke Castile / Benjamin Okolski	178.40	3	59.77	1	118.63
2	Rena Inoue / John Baldwin	178.15	1	62.73	2	115.42
3	Naomi Nari Nam / Themistocles Leftheris	168.49	2	62.29	3	106.20
4	Amanda Evora / Mark Ladwig	158.66	6	53.24	4	105.42
5	Tiffany Vise / Derek Trent	155.46	4	58.44	6	97.02
6	Kendra Moyle / Andy Seitz	148.70	5	54.30	9	94.40
7	Julia Vlassov / Drew Meekins	147.93	9	49.69	5	98.24
8	Rhea Sy / Cole Davis	147.10	8	50.49	7	96.61
9	Bridget Namiotka / John Coughlin	146.88	7	50.91	8	95.97
10	Chloé Katz / Joseph Lynch	133.68	10	48.21	10	85.47
11	MeeRan Trombley / Laureano Ibarra	130.74	12	46.49	11	84.25
12	Marisa Sharma / Ethan Burgess	126.52	11	47.74	13	78.78
13	Katie Beriau / Alexander Merritt	119.20	15	39.70	12	79.50
14	Stephanie Kuban / Steven Pottenger	114.54	13	41.63	14	72.91
15	Shantel Jordan / Steven Elefante	110.48	14	41.37	15	69.11
16	Amber Wehrle / Nicholas Kole	99.07	16	33.50	16	65.57

=== Ice dance ===
Rank	Name	Total points	CD		OD		FD	
1	Tanith Belbin / Benjamin Agosto	202.88	1	39.43	1	61.41	1	102.04
2	Melissa Gregory / Denis Petukhov	187.64	3	34.65	2	56.45	2	96.54
3	Meryl Davis / Charlie White	184.11	2	36.18	4	54.72	3	93.21
4	Kimberly Navarro / Brent Bommentre	175.68	4	32.43	3	55.05	4	88.20
5	Morgan Matthews / Maxim Zavozin	160.92	5	30.91	5	49.38	5	80.63
6	Jennifer Wester / Daniil Barantsev	153.34	6	27.81	6	47.46	7	78.07
7	Caitlin Mallory / Brent Holdburg	151.76	7	26.85	7	45.89	6	79.02
8	Charlotte Maxwell / Nick Traxler	147.03	10	26.01	8	45.20	8	75.82
9	Elizabeth Miosi / Dmitry Ponomarev	141.39	9	26.77	9	43.43	9	71.19
10	Mimi Whetstone / Chris Obzansky	138.46	8	26.78	10	43.34	10	68.34
11	Kate Slattery / Chuen-Gun Lee	134.14	11	23.76	11	43.18	11	67.20
12	Isabel Elliman / Dmitriy Serebrenik	123.81	12	22.18	12	37.09	12	64.54

== Junior results ==
=== Men ===
Rank	Name	Total points	SP		FS	
1	Eliot Halverson	187.79	1	65.12	2	122.67
2	Brandon Mroz	178.56	2	61.76	3	116.80
3	Austin Kanallakan	177.94	6	55.04	1	122.90
4	Curran Oi	170.50	4	58.27	5	112.23
5	Douglas Razzano	168.26	3	58.31	6	109.95
6	Adam Rippon	158.50	7	52.82	7	105.68
7	Princeton Kwong	157.97	5	57.39	8	100.58
8	Richard Dornbush	156.72	13	44.18	4	112.54
9	Jonathan Cassar	150.83	9	52.54	9	98.29
10	Daniel Raad	147.72	8	52.71	10	95.01
11	Andrew Gonzales	141.59	10	47.98	12	93.61
12	Grant Hochstein	140.51	11	46.26	11	94.25
13	William Brewster	132.75	14	42.16	13	90.59
14	Q. Kelvin Vu	129.03	12	45.78	14	83.25
15	Schuyler Eldridge	114.83	15	39.11	15	75.72

=== Ladies ===
Rank	Name	Total points	SP		FS	
1	Mirai Nagasu	155.46	1	54.26	1	101.20
2	Caroline Zhang	151.88	2	53.87	2	98.01
3	Ashley Wagner	145.86	4	51.20	3	94.66
4	Blake Rosenthal	130.99	3	51.67	8	79.32
5	Alexe Gilles	129.37	6	46.43	5	82.94
6	Chrissy Hughes	129.21	8	44.40	4	84.81
7	Sherry Barnes	124.37	9	43.70	7	80.67
8	Victoria Rackohn	122.79	7	46.07	9	76.72
9	Kirsten Olson	120.96	14	38.71	6	82.25
10	Michaelee Scarincio	118.53	5	46.73	11	71.80
11	Chaochih Liu	114.00	13	41.20	10	72.80
12	Brittney Rizo	111.54	11	42.35	12	69.19
13	Brittney Westdorp	103.67	10	43.69	13	59.98
14	Kelcie Lee	97.50	12	41.40	14	56.10

=== Pairs ===
Rank	Name	Total points	SP		FS	
1	Keauna McLaughlin / Rockne Brubaker	162.23	1	61.76	1	100.47
2	Bianca Butler / Joseph Jacobsen	146.83	2	54.48	2	92.35
3	Jessica Rose Paetsch / Jon Nuss	143.27	3	53.93	4	89.34
4	Kaela Pflumm / Christopher Pottenger	143.07	4	52.32	3	90.75
5	Andrea Best / Trevor Young	134.86	5	48.94	5	85.92
6	Meg Byrne / Nathan Bartholomay	129.19	6	48.09	7	81.10
7	Lisa Moore / Justin Gaumond	125.05	8	43.25	6	81.80
8	Chelsi Guillen / Danny Curzon	122.25	7	43.35	8	78.90
9	Janyce Okamoto / Ryan Berning	107.41	9	39.32	9	68.09
10	Ashlee Brown / Nathan Miller	101.62	12	35.08	10	66.54
11	Kelsey Syme / John Pfoh	100.47	10	37.34	11	63.13
12	Lara Shelton / Neill Shelton	97.54	11	36.57	13	60.97
13	Claire Davis / Brendyn Hatfield	94.51	13	33.46	12	61.05

=== Ice dance ===
Rank	Name	Total points	CD1		CD2		OD		FD	
1	Emily Samuelson / Evan Bates	167.65	1	17.77	1	17.98	2	50.63	1	81.27
2	Madison Hubbell / Keiffer Hubbell	167.48	2	17.47	2	17.15	1	54.00	2	78.86
3	Lynn Kriengkrairut / Logan Giulietti-Schmitt	142.92	7	14.26	6	14.19	3	46.91	4	67.56
4	Piper Gilles / Timothy McKernan	142.77	4	14.60	5	14.48	4	46.06	3	67.63
5	Shannon Wingle / Ryan Devereaux	142.38	5	14.51	3	14.82	5	45.67	5	67.38
6	Pilar Bosley / John Corona	138.38	3	15.22	4	14.67	7	43.94	7	64.55
7	Brooke Huber / Karl Edelmann	137.93	6	14.31	7	13.91	6	44.41	6	65.30
8	Samantha Tomarchio / Nicholas Sinchak	131.50	8	14.05	8	13.39	8	43.78	9	60.28
9	Brianne Oswald / Buckley Withrow	122.72	9	13.08	9	11.99	10	37.29	8	60.36
10	Clare Farrell / Charles Fishpaw	116.54	10	12.37	11	11.74	11	37.19	11	55.24
11	Lindsay Cohen / Evan Roberts	114.39	11	12.03	12	11.48	13	34.36	10	56.52
12	Jessica Perino / William Avila	109.70	13	11.28	10	11.96	9	38.15	14	48.31
13	Rachel Siegel / Kevin Miller	107.30	14	10.70	14	10.65	12	35.50	13	50.45
14	Amanda Loyd / Ashley Deavers	105.16	12	11.45	13	11.20	14	31.62	12	50.89

== International team selections ==
=== World Championships ===
	Men	Ladies	Pairs	Ice dancing
1	Evan Lysacek	Kimmie Meissner	Brooke Castile / Ben Okolski	Tanith Belbin / Ben Agosto
2	Ryan Bradley	Emily Hughes	Rena Inoue / John Baldwin	Melissa Gregory / Denis Petukhov
3	Johnny Weir	Alissa Czisny		Meryl Davis / Charlie White
1st alternate	Jeremy Abbott	Bebe Liang	Naomi Nari Nam / Themi Leftheris	Kim Navarro / Brent Bommentre
2nd alternate	Scott Smith	Danielle Kahle	Amanda Evora / Mark Ladwig	Morgan Matthews / Maxim Zavozin
3rd alternate	Derrick Delmore	Juliana Cannarozzo	Tiffany Vise / Derek Trent	Jennifer Wester / Daniil Barantsev

=== Four Continents Championships ===
	Men	Ladies	Pairs	Ice dancing
1	Evan Lysacek	Kimmie Meissner	Brooke Castile / Ben Okolski	Tanith Belbin / Ben Agosto
2	Ryan Bradley	Emily Hughes	Rena Inoue / John Baldwin	Melissa Gregory / Denis Petukhov
3	Johnny Weir	Alissa Czisny	Naomi Nari Nam / Themi Leftheris	Meryl Davis / Charlie White
1st alternate	Jeremy Abbott	Bebe Liang	Amanda Evora / Mark Ladwig	Kim Navarro / Brent Bommentre
2nd alternate	Scott Smith	Danielle Kahle	Tiffany Vise / Derek Trent	Morgan Matthews / Maxim Zavozin
3rd alternate	Derrick Delmore	Juliana Cannarozzo	Kendra Moyle / Andy Seitz	Jennifer Wester / Daniil Barantsev

=== World Junior Championships ===
	Men	Ladies	Pairs	Ice dancing
1	Stephen Carriere	Mirai Nagasu	Keauna McLaughlin / Rockne Brubaker	Emily Samuelson / Evan Bates
2	Eliot Halverson	Caroline Zhang	Kendra Moyle / Andy Seitz	Madison Hubbell / Keiffer Hubbell
3	Brandon Mroz	Ashley Wagner	Bridget Namiotka / John Coughlin	Lynn Kriengkrairut / Logan Giulietti-Schmitt
1st alternate	Austin Kanallakan	Rachael Flatt	Bianca Butler / Joseph Jacobsen	Piper Gilles / Timothy McKernan
2nd alternate	Tommy Steenberg	Danielle Kahle	Jessica Rose Paetsch / Jon Nuss	Shannon Wingle / Ryan Devereaux
3rd alternate	Curran Oi	Juliana Cannarozzo	Kaela Pflumm / Christopher Pottenger	Pilar Bosley / John Corona
