= Juliana Cannarozzo =

American figure skater and actress

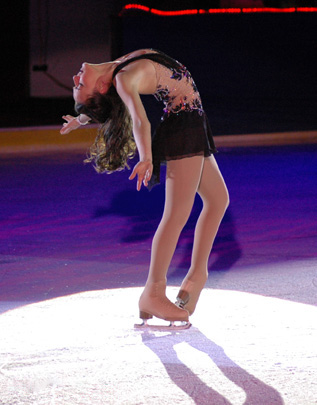
- Cannarozzo in 2007

Personal information
- Born: August 27, 1989 (age 36) Boston, Massachusetts, U.S.
- Height: 5 ft 3 in (160 cm)

Figure skating career
- Country: United States
- Coach: Mark Mitchell, Peter Johansson
- Skating club: Skating Club of Boston
- Began skating: 1995
- Retired: 2008

Juliana Cannarozzo (born August 27, 1989) is an American former competitive figure skater and actress. She won two gold medals on the ISU Junior Grand Prix series.

== Personal life ==
Juliana Cannarozzo was born in Boston, Massachusetts, and raised in Reading, Massachusetts. Her older sister, Lauren Cannarozzo, was also a competitive skater.

== Skating career ==
During her career, Cannarozzo trained at the Skating Club of Boston and was coached by Mark Mitchell and Peter Johansson. She made her Junior Grand Prix debut in the 2005–06 season and won two bronze medals. She just missed out qualifying for the Junior Grand Prix Final. At the 2006 U.S. Championships, she placed 5th on the junior level.

In the 2006–07 season, Cannarozzo won two gold medals on the 2006–07 ISU Junior Grand Prix circuit, which qualified her for the Junior Grand Prix Final, where she placed seventh. Her qualification for the Final gave her a bye to the 2007 U.S. Championships. She made her senior debut at Nationals and placed 7th. She was the third alternate for the 2007 World Championships, the 2007 World Junior Championships, and the 2007 Four Continents Championships.

Cannarozzo dealt with injuries during the 2007–08 season. She competed twice on the Junior Grand Prix, placing 4th and 12th at her events. At the Eastern Sectional Championships, the last step in qualifying for the 2008 U.S. Championships, she placed 7th and did not qualify for Nationals.

Cannarozzo retired from competitive skating following the 2007–08 season. She then toured with Holiday on Ice in Europe. She currently performs as the primary female soloist in the ice skating show Rhythm of Nature at Busch Gardens Tampa Bay.

== Acting career ==
Cannarozzo played the role of Zoey Bloch in the Disney movie Ice Princess. She has also appeared in commercials in Taiwan.

== Programs ==
Season	Short program	Free skating	Exhibition
2007–2008	Sleepwalk by Santo Farina, John Farina, Ann Farina	Revirando; Oblivion; Tangazzo by Astor Piazzolla	
2006–2007	Egyptian Disco by DJ Disse and Peter Langerman	Revirando; Oblivion; Tangazzo by Astor Piazzolla	The Prayer by Charlotte Church, Josh Groban
2005–2006	Harem by Sarah Brightman	Angels in America by Thomas Newman	
2004–2005	Harem by Sarah Brightman	Doctor Zhivago by Maurice Jarre	
2003–2004	Time to Say Goodbye by Francesco Sartori	Jealousy	

== Competitive highlights ==
International
Event	2004–05	2005–06	2006–07	2007–08
JGP Final			7th	
JGP Bulgaria		3rd		
JGP Estonia				4th
JGP Hungary			1st	
JGP Japan		3rd		
JGP Norway			1st	
JGP U.K.				12th
National
U.S. Champ.	6th J.	5th J.	7th	
Levels: N. = Novice; J. = Junior
