= 2008 U.S. Figure Skating Championships =

Figure skating competition

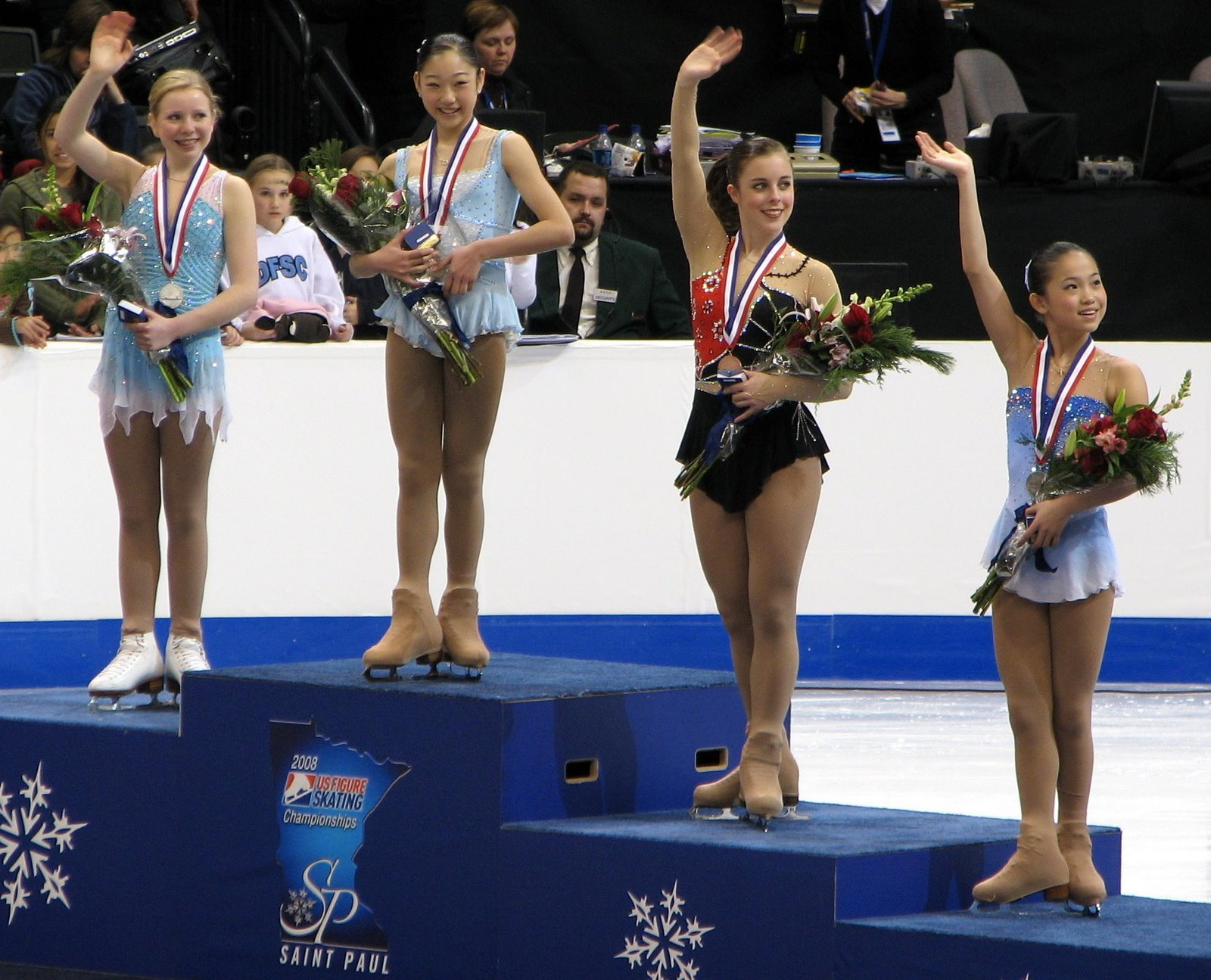
- The senior ladies' podium
- Type: National Championship
- Date: January 20 – 27
- Season: 2007–08
- Location: Saint Paul, Minnesota
- Venue: Xcel Energy Center

Champions
- Men's singles: Evan Lysacek
- Ladies' singles: Mirai Nagasu
- Pairs: Keauna McLaughlin / Rockne Brubaker
- Ice dance: Tanith Belbin / Benjamin Agosto
- Previous: 2007 U.S. Championships
- Next: 2009 U.S. Championships

The 2008 U.S. Figure Skating Championships took place between January 20 and 27th at the Xcel Energy Center in Saint Paul, Minnesota. Skaters competed in four disciplines – men's singles, ladies' singles, pair skating, and ice dancing – across three levels of competition – senior, junior, and novice. Medals were awarded in four colors: gold (first), silver (second), bronze (third), and pewter (fourth).

The event was used to determine the U.S. teams for the 2008 World Championships, 2008 Four Continents Championships, and 2008 World Junior Championships.

== Competition notes ==
- Reigning four-time ice dancing silver medalists Melissa Gregory / Denis Petukhov withdrew before the event due to injury.
- Reigning silver medalist single skater Emily Hughes withdrew before the event due to injury.
- Ladies gold medalist Mirai Nagasu, silver medalist Rachael Flatt, and pewter medalist Caroline Zhang were not placed on the World or Four Continents team because they were not age-eligible.
- Evan Lysacek and Johnny Weir tied in the overall score, with Weir winning the short program and Lysacek winning the free skating. Lysacek won the title on the first tiebreak under International Skating Union rules, which was the free skating score.

== Qualifying ==
Qualification for the U.S. Championships begins at one of nine regional competitions. The regions are New England, North Atlantic, South Atlantic, Upper Great Lakes, Eastern Great Lakes, Southwestern, Northwest Pacific, Central Pacific, and Southwest Pacific. The top four finishers in each regional advance to one of three sectional competitions (Eastern, Midwestern, and Pacific Coast). Skaters who place in the top four at sectionals advance to the U.S. Championships.

The top five finishers in each discipline from the previous year are given byes to the U.S. Championships, as are any skaters who qualify for the Junior or the Senior Grand Prix Final. Skaters are also given byes through a qualifying competition if they are assigned to an international event during the time that qualifying event is to take place. For example, if a skater is competing at an event at the same time as his or her regional competition, that skater would receive a bye to sectionals. If a skater is competing at an event at the same time as his or her sectional competition, that skater would qualify for the national event without having had to compete at a sectional championship.

== Senior results ==
=== Men ===
Rank	Name	Total points	SP		FS	
1	Evan Lysacek	244.77 (Note: Weir and Lysacek tied in the overall score. Lysacek won the title on the tiebreaker, which was the free skating placement.)	2	82.05	1	162.72
2	Johnny Weir	244.77	1	83.40	2	161.37
3	Stephen Carriere	228.06	3	76.66	3	151.40
4	Jeremy Abbott	221.85	5	73.28	4	148.57
5	Ryan Bradley	221.31	4	74.20	5	147.11
6	Scott Smith	210.55	6	66.34	6	144.21
7	Wesley Campbell	200.10	8	65.53	7	134.57
8	Shaun Rogers	195.96	13	64.11	9	131.85
9	Tommy Steenberg	195.32	12	64.22	10	131.10
10	Dennis Phan	193.75	15	59.27	8	134.48
11	Parker Pennington	188.82	10	65.32	13	123.50
12	Geoffry Varner	184.52	9	65.40	14	119.12
13	Eliot Halverson	183.67	17	56.03	11	127.64
14	Braden Overett	182.86	16	57.18	12	125.68
15	Derrick Delmore	180.83	7	65.67	16	115.16
16	Douglas Razzano	180.21	11	64.83	15	115.38
17	Michael Villarreal	164.35	14	61.66	18	102.69
18	Rohene Ward	160.45	18	54.83	17	105.62

=== Ladies ===
Rank	Name	Total points	SP		FS	
1	Mirai Nagasu	190.41	1	70.23	3	120.18
2	Rachael Flatt	188.73	3	62.91	1	125.82
3	Ashley Wagner	188.56	2	65.15	2	123.41
4	Caroline Zhang	173.16	7	53.49	4	119.67
5	Bebe Liang	164.87	6	55.10	5	109.77
6	Katrina Hacker	158.28	5	56.87	6	101.41
7	Kimmie Meissner	157.56	4	57.58	7	99.98
8	Melissa Bulanhagui	149.22	8	52.77	8	96.45
9	Alissa Czisny	146.38	9	50.58	9	95.80
10	Becky Bereswill	137.65	14	46.52	10	91.13
11	Tenile Victorsen	132.80	15	44.86	11	87.94
12	Danielle Kahle	132.22	10	50.46	13	81.76
13	Megan Williams-Stewart	130.40	12	49.23	14	81.17
14	Chrissy Hughes	126.84	16	43.36	12	83.48
15	Molly Oberstar	125.13	11	49.47	15	75.66
16	Karen Zhou	116.30	17	42.62	16	73.68
17	Angie Lien	112.25	13	47.42	20	64.83
18	Megan Hyatt	108.69	19	35.32	17	73.37
19	Stephanie Roth	107.49	18	40.76	18	66.73
20	Laney Diggs	99.20	20	33.22	19	65.98

=== Pairs ===
Rank	Name	Total points	SP		FS	
1	Keauna McLaughlin / Rockne Brubaker	190.74	1	66.54	1	124.20
2	Rena Inoue / John Baldwin	183.17	2	65.24	2	117.93
3	Brooke Castile / Ben Okolski	175.07	3	58.95	3	116.12
4	Tiffany Vise / Derek Trent	161.20	5	53.97	4	107.23
5	Amanda Evora / Mark Ladwig	158.94	4	57.10	5	101.84
6	Caitlin Yankowskas / John Coughlin	153.80	6	52.09	6	101.71
7	Naomi Nari Nam / Themistocles Leftheris	145.89	8	48.51	7	97.38
8	Chloé Katz / Joseph Lynch	142.29	7	50.62	8	91.67
9	Bianca Butler / Joseph Jacobsen	136.65	11	45.33	9	91.32
10	MeeRan Trombley / Laureano Ibarra	130.29	12	44.39	10	85.90
11	Kaela Pflumm / Christopher Pottenger	127.27	10	46.73	12	80.54
12	Katie Beriau / Alexander Merritt	125.52	9	47.09	14	78.43
13	Amber Wehrle / Nicholas Kole	125.17	13	43.64	11	81.53
14	Laura Lepzinski / Ethan Burgess	119.40	14	42.89	15	76.51
15	Kendra Moyle / Steven Pottenger	117.98	15	38.03	13	79.95

=== Ice dancing ===
Rank	Name	Total points	CD		OD		FD	
1	Tanith Belbin / Ben Agosto	216.07	1	41.86	1	64.29	1	109.92
2	Meryl Davis / Charlie White	206.82	2	40.59	2	62.69	2	103.54
3	Kimberly Navarro / Brent Bommentre	187.94	3	35.38	3	58.71	3	93.85
4	Emily Samuelson / Evan Bates	175.16	4	34.00	4	57.62	6	83.54
5	Jennifer Wester / Daniil Barantsev	169.37	5	30.46	6	53.26	5	85.65
6	Jane Summersett / Todd Gilles	166.86	10	26.31	5	53.35	4	87.20
7	Charlotte Maxwell / Nick Traxler	161.17	7	28.53	7	51.20	7	81.44
8	Mimi Whetstone / Chris Obzansky	157.10	6	28.69	8	48.72	8	79.69
9	Lynn Kriengkrairut / Logan Giulietti-Schmitt	151.50	8	27.76	9	46.33	9	77.41
10	Mauri Gustafson / Joel Dear	138.20	9	26.83	10	44.97	10	66.40
11	Clare Farrell / Charles Fishpaw	130.90	11	23.84	11	42.71	11	64.35
12	Marsha Snyder / Peter Fischl	120.51	12	21.09	12	38.42	12	61.00
13	Stacy Kim / Jonathan Harris	105.71	13	20.84	13	30.75	13	54.12

== Junior results ==
=== Men ===
Rank	Name	Total points	SP		FS	
1	Adam Rippon	213.76	1	71.33	1	142.43
2	Brandon Mroz	203.63	3	65.89	2	137.74
3	Andrew Gonzales	182.27	4	60.01	4	122.26
4	Richard Dornbush	179.27	12	52.46	3	126.81
5	Keegan Messing	176.63	6	57.11	5	119.52
6	Curran Oi	176.44	2	68.15	10	108.29
7	Alexander Johnson	169.19	5	59.12	9	110.07
8	Armin Mahbanoozadeh	167.76	9	53.29	6	114.47
9	William Brewster	167.70	7	56.43	8	111.27
10	Austin Kanallakan	165.06	10	53.02	7	112.04
11	Grant Hochstein	162.12	8	53.84	11	108.28
12	Zachary DeWulf	152.68	11	52.89	13	99.79
13	Max Aaron	146.98	13	49.52	14	97.46
14	Daniel Raad	145.30	16	43.20	12	102.10
15	Osadolo Irowa	141.46	14	45.32	15	96.14
16	Theron James	116.52	15	43.71	16	72.81

=== Ladies ===
Rank	Name	Total points	SP		FS	
1	Alexe Gilles	156.17	3	52.63	1	103.54
2	Angela Maxwell	150.11	1	54.91	3	95.20
3	Brittney Rizo	149.60	2	54.59	4	95.01
4	Kristine Musademba	143.86	5	49.10	5	94.76
5	Amanda Dobbs	142.76	6	47.36	2	95.40
6	Victoria Rackohn	137.70	4	49.50	6	88.20
7	Kirsten Olson	130.21	7	46.56	7	83.65
8	Ellie Kawamura	122.74	8	45.53	8	77.21
9	Rebecca Stern	110.76	11	40.17	9	70.59
10	Jane Ruan	110.72	9	44.97	11	65.75
11	Carolyn-Ann Alba	108.68	12	40.16	10	68.52
12	Alexa Scimeca	104.20	10	43.74	12	60.46
13	Masha Leonov	97.54	13	39.70	13	57.84
14	Victoria Fairchild	91.40	14	39.47	14	51.93

=== Pairs ===
Rank	Name	Total points	SP		FS	
1	Jessica Rose Paetsch / Jon Nuss	143.19	2	52.13	1	91.06
2	Tracy Tanovich / Michael Chau	137.36	3	50.83	2	86.53
3	Chelsi Guillen / Danny Curzon	134.58	1	53.65	4	80.93
4	Andrea Best / Trevor Young	129.75	5	47.04	3	82.71
5	Meg Byrne / Nathan Bartholomay	124.71	6	45.56	5	79.15
6	Lisa Moore / Justin Gaumond	123.69	4	47.14	6	76.55
7	Jaylyn Kelly / Gabe Woodruff	113.90	10	38.99	7	74.91
8	Janyce Okamoto / Ryan Berning	113.42	9	41.63	8	71.79
9	Megan Gueli / Grant Marron	107.41	8	42.53	10	64.88
10	Arielle Trujillo / Daniyel Cohen	104.02	12	35.70	9	68.32
11	Rachel DeRita / Brandon Accardi	101.50	11	38.41	11	63.09
12	Claire Davis / Nathan Miller	100.70	7	43.34	13	57.36
13	Molly Schleicher / Christopher Schleicher	95.64	13	34.15	12	61.49

=== Ice dancing ===
Rank	Name	Total points	CD		OD		FD	
1	Madison Hubbell / Keiffer Hubbell	167.48	1	34.61	3	50.66	1	82.21
2	Piper Gilles / Timothy McKernan	161.66	2	30.97	4	50.24	2	80.45
3	Madison Chock / Greg Zuerlein	161.40	4	29.92	1	53.03	3	78.45
4	Maia Shibutani / Alex Shibutani	157.80	7	27.66	2	52.32	4	77.82
5	Shannon Wingle / Ryan Devereaux	154.09	8	27.42	5	49.17	5	77.50
6	Pilar Bosley / John Corona	144.37	3	30.07	6	48.35	9	65.95
7	Sara Bailey / Kyle Herring	141.62	5	29.29	11	42.25	6	70.08
8	Anastasia Cannuscio / Dean Copely	140.14	6	28.50	7	45.51	8	66.13
9	Isabella Cannuscio / Ian Lorello	139.14	9	26.37	8	44.88	7	67.89
10	Rachel Tibbetts / Collin Brubaker	131.72	11	24.61	9	44.56	10	62.55
11	Rachael Richardson / Brad Coulter	127.62	12	24.06	10	43.70	12	59.86
12	Kaylyn Patitucci / Karl Edelmann	127.12	13	23.41	12	41.91	11	61.80
13	Michelle Pennington / Andrew Skillington	124.74	10	25.42	13	40.21	13	59.11

== International team selections ==
=== World Championships ===
	Men	Ladies	Pairs	Ice dancing
1	Evan Lysacek	Ashley Wagner	Rena Inoue / John Baldwin	Tanith Belbin / Ben Agosto
2	Johnny Weir	Bebe Liang	Brooke Castile / Ben Okolski	Meryl Davis / Charlie White
3	Stephen Carriere	Kimmie Meissner		Kim Navarro / Brent Bommentre
1st alternate	Jeremy Abbott	Katrina Hacker	Tiffany Vise / Derek Trent	Jennifer Wester / Daniil Barantsev
2nd alternate	Ryan Bradley	Melissa Bulanhagui	Amanda Evora / Mark Ladwig	Jane Summersett / Todd Gilles
3rd alternate	Scott Smith	Alissa Czisny	Caitlin Yankowskas / John Coughlin	Charlotte Maxwell / Nick Traxler

=== Four Continents Championships ===
	Men	Ladies	Pairs	Ice dancing
1	Evan Lysacek	Ashley Wagner	Rena Inoue / John Baldwin	Meryl Davis / Charlie White
2	Johnny Weir	Bebe Liang	Brooke Castile / Ben Okolski	Kim Navarro / Brent Bommentre
3	Stephen Carriere	Katrina Hacker	Tiffany Vise / Derek Trent	Jennifer Wester / Daniil Barantsev
1st alternate	Jeremy Abbott	Alexe Gilles	Amanda Evora / Mark Ladwig	Jane Summersett / Todd Gilles
2nd alternate	Ryan Bradley	Melissa Bulanhagui	Caitlin Yankowskas / John Coughlin	Charlotte Maxwell / Nick Traxler
3rd alternate	Scott Smith	Alissa Czisny	Naomi Nari Nam / Themi Leftheris	Mimi Whetstone / Chris Obzansky

=== World Junior Championships ===
	Men	Ladies	Pairs	Ice dancing
1	Adam Rippon	Mirai Nagasu	Bianca Butler / Joseph Jacobsen	Emily Samuelson / Evan Bates
2	Brandon Mroz	Rachael Flatt	Jessica Rose Paetsch / Jon Nuss	Madison Hubbell / Keiffer Hubbell
3	Tommy Steenberg	Caroline Zhang	Chelsi Guillen / Danny Curzon	
1st alternate	Eliot Halverson	Alexe Gilles	Kaela Pflumm / Christopher Pottenger	Piper Gilles / Timothy McKernan
2nd alternate	Douglas Razzano	Angela Maxwell	Meg Byrne / Nathan Bartholomay	Madison Chock / Greg Zuerlein
3rd alternate	Andrew Gonzales	Melissa Bulanhagui	Arielle Trujillo / Daniyel Cohen	Shannon Wingle / Ryan Devereaux
