= Stephen Carriere =

American figure skater

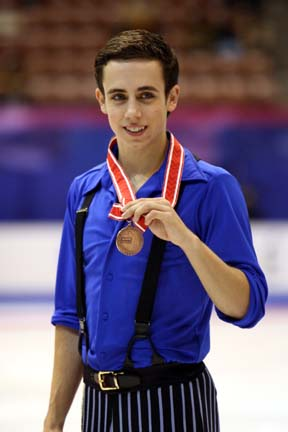
- Carriere at the 2007 NHK Trophy

Personal information
- Born: June 15, 1989 (age 37) Melrose, Massachusetts, U.S.
- Home town: Boston, Massachusetts, U.S.
- Height: 5 ft 7 in (1.70 m)

Figure skating career
- Country: United States
- Discipline: Men's singles
- Began skating: 1994
- Retired: June 10, 2015

Medal record
U.S. Championships
| Bronze medal – third place | 2008 Saint Paul | Singles |
World Junior Championships
| Gold medal – first place | 2007 Oberstdorf | Singles |
Junior Grand Prix Final
| Gold medal – first place | 2006–07 Sofia | Singles |

Stephen Carriere (born June 15, 1989) is an American former competitive figure skater. He is the 2007 World Junior champion, 2006 JGP Final champion, and 2008 U.S. national bronze medalist. During his career, he has won two Grand Prix medals, one ISU Challenger Series medal, and four ISU Junior Grand Prix medals.

== Personal life ==
Carriere was born in 1989. He graduated from Wakefield High School in 2007. In 2007, he began attending Boston College part-time, where he was a corporate business major.

Carriere graduated from the Carroll School of Management at Boston College with a degree in marketing and management in 2015.

His cousin, Caroline Hallisey, is a short track speed skater and a three-time Olympian.

== Career ==
From 2000 through 2009, Carriere trained at the Skating Club of Boston and was coached by Mark Mitchell and Peter Johansson.

Carriere won the pewter medal at the novice level of the 2004 U.S. Championships. The following season, he made his junior debut. He placed 5th at his first Junior Grand Prix assignment but was not given a second one. That year, he placed 7th at 2005 U.S. Championships on the junior level.

In the 2005–2006 season, Carriere won a gold and a silver medal on the Junior Grand Prix and then placed 6th at the Final. He moved up at Nationals and won the junior gold medal. This earned him a trip to the World Junior Championships, where he placed just off the podium.

During the 2006–07 season, he won everything on the Junior level, including both his Junior Grand Prix assignments and the 2006 ISU Junior Grand Prix Final. After placing ninth in his senior national debut, Carriere was named to the 2007 World Junior team. There, after placing sixth in the short program, he won the free skate, pulling up to win the event overall.

Carriere made his senior Grand Prix debut at the 2007 Skate America, where he placed 4th. At his second Grand Prix event, the 2007 NHK Trophy, he won the bronze medal. He also won the bronze medal at nationals and finished 10th at the 2008 World Championships.

In the 2008–09 Grand Prix season, Carriere competed at the 2008 Cup of China and the 2008 NHK Trophy, winning the silver medal in China and placing 6th in Japan. In January 2009, he was involved in a car accident, but was unharmed. He placed 9th at the 2009 U.S. Championships. Following the 2008–09 season, Carriere changed coaches to Priscilla Hill and Karl Kurtz through 2011.

From 2011 through 2015, Carriere trained with Suna Murray at the Skating Club of Boston. In the 2011–12 season, Carriere competed at the Nebelhorn Trophy and Ice Challenge, winning the bronze medal in Germany and the gold medal in Austria. In the 2012–13 season, Carriere competed at the Nebelhorn Trophy, where he placed 4th. In the 2013–14 season, Carriere competed at the U.S International Classic, winning the silver medal in Salt Lake City. In the 2014–15 season, Carriere won the gold medal at the 2014 CS Ondrej Nepela Trophy in Bratislava. He further went on to place 4th at the 2014 Skate Canada International in Kelowna and 9th at the 2014 Rostelecom Cup in Moscow.

Carriere missed the 2010, 2011, and 2015 U.S. Championships due to recurring tendonitis and a right ankle infection.

On June 10, 2015, Carriere announced his retirement from competitive figure skating.

== Programs ==
| Season | Short program | Free skate | Exhibition | Ref. |
|---|---|---|---|---|
| 2001–02 | —N/a | Zorro | —N/a | |
| 2002–03 | Zorro | Elvis Presley medley | —N/a | |
| 2003–04 | Shaft By Isaac Hayes | Elvis Presley medley | —N/a | |
| 2004–05 | Shaft By Isaac Hayes | Lawrence of Arabia By Maurice Jarre; Samson and Delilah By Victor Young | —N/a | |
| 2005–06 | Peter Gunn Mambo By Henry Mancini | Once Upon a Time in Mexico By Robert Rodriguez | —N/a | |
| 2006–07 | "Stray Cat Strut" By Brian Setzer; "The Pink Panther Theme" By Henry Mancini | Space Shuttle By John LaBarbera; "God Bless the Child" By Billie Holiday & Arthur Herzog | "Sway" By Michael Bublé | |
| 2007–08 | "Stairway to Heaven" By Led Zeppelin | Hollywood Nocturne By The Brian Setzer Orchestra | "SexyBack" By Justin Timberlake | |
| 2008–09 | "Nothing Else Matters" By Metallica | The Firebird By Igor Stravinsky | "Billie Jean" By David Cook | |
| 2009–10 | Carmina Burana By Carl Orff | The Firebird By Igor Stravinsky | "Mr. Cellophane" | |
| 2010–11 | "After Midnight"; "Hot Honey Rag" From Chicago By Danny Elfman | West Side Story By Leonard Bernstein | —N/a | |
| 2011–12 | La Vie en rose; "Mack the Knife" By Louis Armstrong | Swan Lake By Pyotr Ilyich Tchaikovsky | —N/a | |
| 2012–13 | Passionata By London Musicians Orchestra | Swan Lake By Pyotr Ilyich Tchaikovsky | —N/a | |
| 2013–14 | Scheherazade By Nikolai Rimsky-Korsakov | Don Quixote By Ludwig Minkus | —N/a | |
| 2014–15 | "La Vie en rose" By Louis Armstrong | Clair de lune By Andre Kostelanetz and his Orchestra; Turning Page By Sleeping At Last | —N/a | |

== Competitive highlights ==
- GP – Event of the ISU Grand Prix Series
- JGP – Event of the ISU Junior Grand Prix Series
- CS – Event of the ISU Challenger Series
- WD – Withdrew from competition

Competition placements at senior level
| Season | 2006–07 | 2007–08 | 2008–09 | 2009–10 | 2010–11 | 2011–12 | 2012–13 | 2013–14 | 2014–15 |
|---|---|---|---|---|---|---|---|---|---|
| World Championships | | 10th | | | | | | | |
| Four Continents Championships | | 4th | | | | | | | |
| U.S. Championships | 9th | 3rd | 9th | WD | | 6th | 10th | 10th | |
| GP Cup of China | | | 2nd | 6th | | | | | |
| GP NHK Trophy | | 3rd | 6th | | | | | | |
| GP Rostelecom Cup | | | | | | | | | 9th |
| GP Skate America | | 4th | | | 9th | | | | |
| GP Skate Canada | | | | 8th | | | | | 4th |
| CS Ondrej Nepela Trophy | | | | | | | | | 1st |
| Finlandia Trophy | | | | 3rd | | | | | |
| Ice Challenge | | | | | | 1st | | | |
| Nebelhorn Trophy | | | | | | 3rd | 4th | | |
| U.S. Classic | | | | | | | | 2nd | |

Competition placements at junior level
| Season | 2003–04 | 2004–05 | 2005–06 | 2006–07 |
|---|---|---|---|---|
| World Junior Championships | | | 4th | 1st |
| U.S. Championships | | 7th | 1st | |
| Junior Grand Prix Final | | | 6th | 1st |
| JGP Bulgaria | | | 1st | |
| JGP Hungary | | | | 1st |
| JGP Netherlands | | | | 1st |
| JGP Slovakia | | | 2nd | |
| JGP Ukraine | | 5th | | |
| Triglav Trophy | 4th | | | |

== Detailed results ==
ISU personal best scores in the +3/-3 GOE System
| Segment | Type | Score | Event |
|---|---|---|---|
| Total | TSS | 231.67 | 2014 Skate Canada International |
| Short program | TSS | 80.33 | 2014 Skate Canada International |
| Short program | TES | 44.58 | 2014 Skate Canada International |
| Short program | PCS | 35.75 | 2014 Skate Canada International |
| Free skating | TSS | 151.34 | 2014 Skate Canada International |
| Free skating | TES | 77.48 | 2014 Skate Canada International |
| Free skating | PCS | 74.86 | 2014 Skate Canada International |
