= Skating Club of Boston Rink =

Indoor ice skating venue in Allston, Massachusetts

Coordinates: 42.3635°N 71.1369°W

- Interactive map of Skating Club of Boston Rink
- Location: 1240 Soldiers Field Rd. Allston, Massachusetts, USA, 02135
- Owner: Skating Club of Boston
- Operator: Skating Club of Boston

Construction
- Opened: January 1, 1939
- Closed: October, 2020
- Demolished: no
- Cost: $180,000

Tenants
- Skating Club of Boston, Fort Devens State Chiefs men's ice hockey

The Skating Club of Boston Rink is an indoor ice skating venue located along the Charles River in the Boston suburbs. The rink was the home of the Skating Club of Boston for over 80 years and was also used as an ice hockey rink.

== History ==
Officially founded in 1911, the Skating Club of Boston used the Boston Arena as their first home. A successful fundraising campaign that took place throughout the 1930s allowed the club to build its own rink after 25 years of sharing the ice surface. The new building was located in Lower Allston and overlooked the Charles River, though it was sometimes listed as being in neighboring Brighton. The land was purchased in the spring of 1938 and construction began soon thereafter. The quonset hut-style building was completed before the end of the year and allowed the official opening to take place on January 1, 1939.

For the first 30 years, the rink was only open during the skating season from fall to spring. Despite having a refrigeration system in a concrete slab, the floor of the facility was not well insulated and the low temperatures caused by its operation could affect a nearby underground spring. The original floor of the rink was replaced in 1967, allowing for it to be in operation year-round, however, not all of the bugs had been worked out prior and after just 6 years the heaving caused by frost necessitated a third installation of the floor. The building had its next crisis in the mid-90s when the roof had to be replaced. Over the previous 50+ years, the original douglas fir timbers had absorbed a great deal of moisture and had begun to rot away. A new steel roof was installed over the summer of 1993 and augmented with sound baffles as well as insulation and moisture-reducing materials.

In 2012, Club president Joseph Blount initialized a plan to build a new facility for the club. Initially, the Club tried to come to an arrangement with Harvard University to swap land and construct a new rink on Lincoln Street in Brighton. When that plan fell through, the club was forced to look outside of Boston city limits and eventually purchased a plot in Norwood in 2017, 20 miles to the south. The Club sold an adjoining plot of land at 1234 Soldiers Field Rd. to pay for the purchase but continued to remain at the old rink while the new one was under construction. After moving to their new facility in 2020, the old building was closed with its ultimate fate currently undecided (as of 2023).
