= Eliot Halverson =

American figure skater (born 1990)

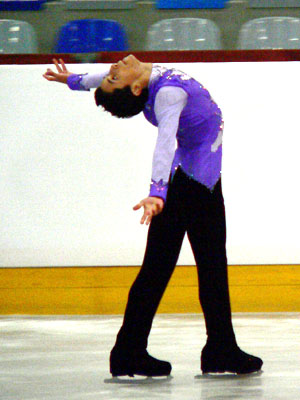
- Halverson in 2006

Personal information
- Full name: Eliot Jon Halverson
- Born: November 8, 1990 (age 35) Bogotá, Colombia
- Home town: St. Paul, Minnesota, U.S.
- Height: 5 ft 6 in (1.67 m)

Figure skating career
- Country: United States
- Discipline: Men's singles
- Coach: Veronica Pershina
- Skating club: Ann Arbor FSC

Eliot Jon Halverson (born November 8, 1990) is an American figure skater. As a men's singles skater, she is the 2007 US Junior National Champion.

== Personal life ==
Halverson was born in Bogotá, Colombia and was adopted from Colombia by an American couple at age five months. She lived and trained in Saint Paul, Minnesota from her move to the United States until 2008, when she began training in Ann Arbor. Halverson's parents are divorced, and she lives with her mother. She was homeschooled.

In 2019, Halverson came out as non-binary and began using she/her pronouns.

== Career ==
Halverson began skating at age six on a frozen pond behind her house. When the World Figure Skating Championships came to Minneapolis in 1998, Halverson skipped school for a week to watch them. This encouraged her to take private lessons and become a more serious skater. She landed her first triple at age 11. Although she is coached primarily by Ted Engelking, Halverson has also worked with Alexei Mishin and Kathy Casey.

She competed in the men's singles division. Halverson can perform a Biellmann spin.

Halverson is the 2003 U.S. Juvenile bronze medalist, 2004 Intermediate champion, and 2005 Novice pewter medalist. Her fourth-place finish at the 2005 United States Figure Skating Championships earned her a trip to the 2005 Triglav Trophy at the novice level, which she won. Halverson stayed novice for the 2005–2006 Olympic season and won the novice title at the 2006 U.S. Figure Skating Championships. In her novice free skate, she landed six triple jumps, including two triple-double combinations.

In the 2006–2007 season, Halverson made her junior debut. She won two bronze medals on the ISU Junior Grand Prix circuit and was second alternate to the 2006–2007 Junior Grand Prix Final. She went on to the 2007 Nationals and won the junior title. Halverson was the first men's skater since Evan Lysacek to win back-to-back novice and junior national titles and is one of only nine skaters to do it since 1932. Her placement at nationals earned her a trip to the 2007 World Junior Figure Skating Championships, where she placed 10th. Until Junior Worlds, Halverson had never placed off the podium in a major event in her career.

Due to her success at the junior level, April 21, 2007, was declared to be "Eliot Halverson Day" in St. Paul, Minnesota.

Halverson began the 2007–2008 season at the Junior Grand Prix Harghita Cup. After placing 6th in the short program, she attempted her first triple axel jump in competition in the free skate. Although she fell on the landing, she rotated it successfully and was given credit for the jump officially. She placed 5th in the long program, placing 5th overall. At her second event, the Pokal der Blauen Schwerter in Germany, she placed 7th overall, after placing 4th in the long program and being credited with her first triple axel of her career.

Halverson made her senior debut at the 2008 Midwestern Sectional Championships, where she won the pewter medal. At the 2008 U.S. Figure Skating Championships, her second senior-level competition, she was the youngest senior in the men's division to compete. Because these championships were held in her hometown of St. Paul, Halverson became a poster-child for the 2008 Nationals. She placed 13th overall and was named first alternate for the 2008 World Junior Figure Skating Championships.

Halverson changed coaches from Ted Engelking to Doug Haw following the 2007–2008 season. She also changed her club affiliation from the St. Paul FSC to the Ann Arbor FSC following her move to Ann Arbor, Michigan. This changed the region she competed out of from Upper Great Lakes to Eastern Great Lakes.

She began the 2008–2009 season at the 2008–2009 ISU Junior Grand Prix event in Courchevel, France, where she placed 8th. At the Eastern Great Lakes Regional Championships in October, she won the silver medal behind Parker Pennington and qualified for Sectionals.

Halverson's 2009–2010 season began at the 2009–2010 ISU Junior Grand Prix event in Belarus, Russia, where she placed 5th. She went on to place second at the Eastern Great Lakes Regional Championships in October, qualifying for Midwestern Sectionals, where she placed 5th to finish her season.

Due to ongoing medical issues related to a pinched nerve in her lower back, Halverson did not compete in the 2010–2011 season. However, she had planned to return to competition for the 2011–2012 season, barring any continued medical issues.

After retiring from competition, Halverson became a coach and choreographer.

== Programs ==
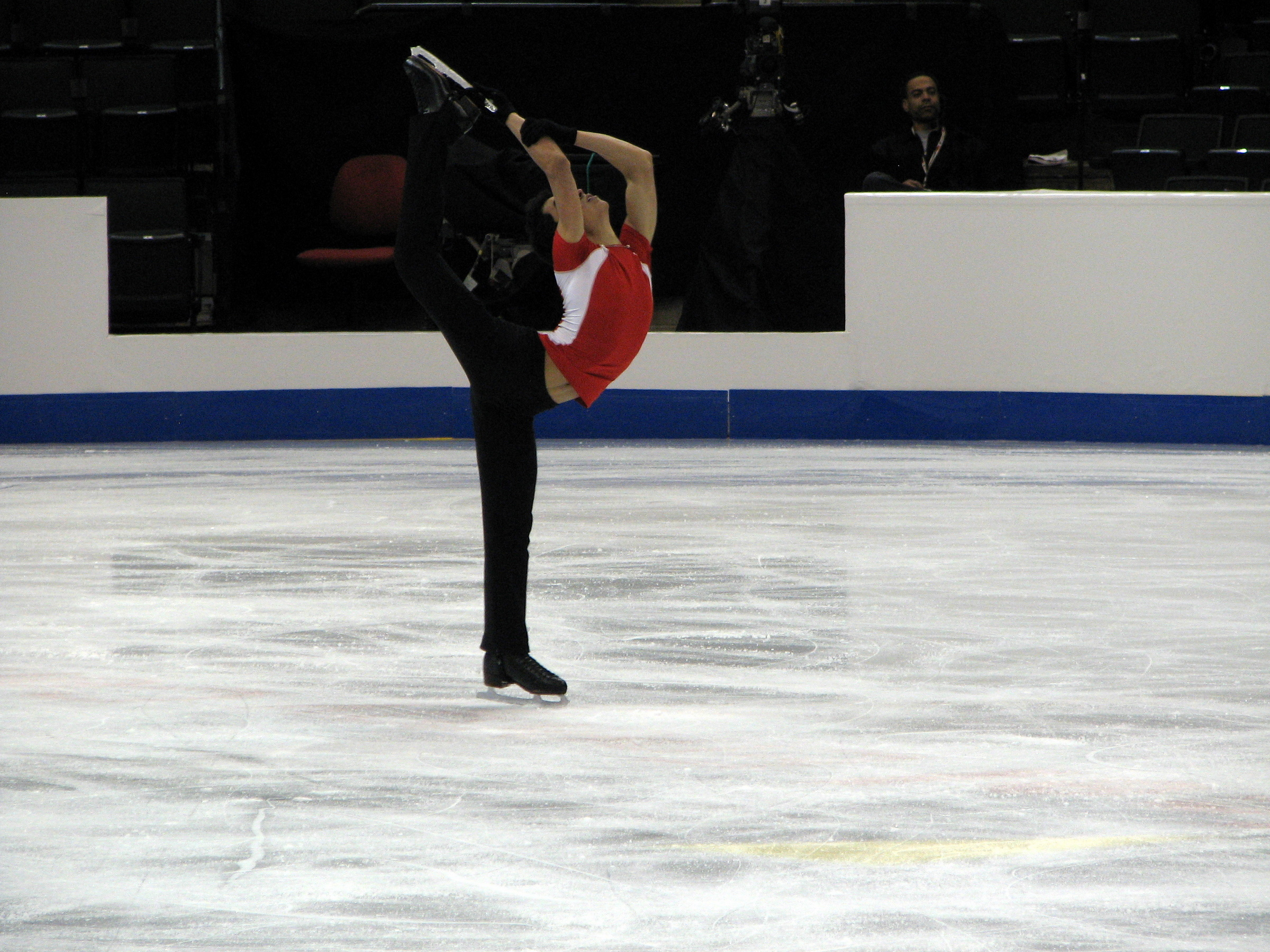
Halverson performs a Biellmann spin in 2008.

Season	Short Program	Free Skating	Exhibition
2009–2010	Layali Al Shara; Final of First Routine	Libertango by Astor Piazzolla; Il Postino	
2008–2009	The Chairman's Waltz by John Williams	Piano Concerto No. 2 in C Minor by Sergei Rachmaninoff	
2007–2008	Libertango by Astor Piazzolla performed by Bond	2046 Main Theme by Shigeru Umebayashi; Nostradamus by Tonči Huljić performed by Maksim Mrvica	
2006–2007	Hana's Eyes by Maksim Mrvica, performed by Tonči Huljić	Tales from the Crypt; The Nightmare Before Christmas; Beetlejuice by Danny Elfman; The Grifters by Bernstein	
2005–2006	Bullfighter medley	Hungarian/Russian folk medley	

== Competitive highlights ==
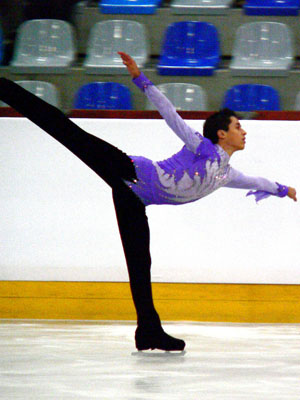
Halverson performs a spiral in competition.

Event	2006–2007	2007–2008	2008–2009	2009–2010
World Junior Championships	10th			
U.S. Championships	1st J.	13th	13th	
Junior Grand Prix, Belarus				5th
Junior Grand Prix, France			8th	
Junior Grand Prix, Germany		7th		
Junior Grand Prix, Romania		5th		
Junior Grand Prix, Netherlands	3rd			
Junior Grand Prix, Hungary	3rd			

- Ju = Juvenile level; N = Novice level; J = Junior level
