= 2008 Four Continents Figure Skating Championships =

2008 Four Continents Championships
- Type: ISU Championship
- Date: February 11 – 17
- Season: 2007–08
- Location: Goyang, South Korea
- Venue: Seongsa Ice Rink

Champions
- Men's singles: (Japan) Daisuke Takahashi
- Ladies' singles: (Japan) Mao Asada
- Pairs: (China) Pang Qing / Tong Jian
- Ice dance: (Canada) Tessa Virtue / Scott Moir
- Previous: 2007 Four Continents Championships
- Next: 2009 Four Continents Championships

The 2008 Four Continents Figure Skating Championships was an international figure skating competition in the 2007–08 season. It was held at the Seongsa Ice Rink in Goyang, South Korea on February 11–17. Medals were awarded in the disciplines of men's singles, ladies' singles, pair skating, and ice dancing.

== Notes ==
- Unlike the other three ISU championships, each nation was allowed to enter 3 skaters/couples in each event, regardless of its skaters performance in the previous year's championships.
- The corresponding competition for European skaters was the 2008 European Figure Skating Championships.
- Skaters must have reached the age of 15 by July 1, 2007 in order to compete.

== Medals table ==
| Rank | Nation | Gold | Silver | Bronze | Total |
|---|---|---|---|---|---|
| 1 | Japan (JPN) | 2 | 0 | 1 | 3 |
| 2 | Canada (CAN) | 1 | 2 | 0 | 3 |
| 3 | China (CHN) | 1 | 1 | 0 | 2 |
| 4 | United States (USA) | 0 | 1 | 3 | 4 |
| Totals (4 entries) | | 4 | 4 | 4 | 12 |

== Results ==
=== Men ===
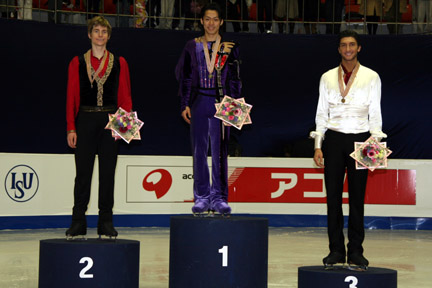
The men's podium. From left: Jeffrey Buttle (2nd), Daisuke Takahashi (1st), Evan Lysacek (3rd).

Daisuke Takahashi set a new world record for the free skating (175.84) and the combined total (264.41).

| Rank | Name | Nation | Total points | SP | | FS | |
|---|---|---|---|---|---|---|---|
| 1 | Daisuke Takahashi | Japan | 264.41 | 1 | 88.57 | 1 | 175.84 |
| 2 | Jeffrey Buttle | Canada | 234.02 | 3 | 83.85 | 2 | 150.17 |
| 3 | Evan Lysacek | United States | 233.11 | 2 | 84.06 | 3 | 149.05 |
| 4 | Stephen Carriere | United States | 218.30 | 4 | 74.08 | 5 | 144.22 |
| 5 | Jeremy Abbott | United States | 206.40 | 9 | 60.87 | 4 | 145.53 |
| 6 | Li Chengjiang | China | 197.98 | 5 | 72.25 | 9 | 125.73 |
| 7 | Vaughn Chipeur | Canada | 196.57 | 6 | 70.83 | 8 | 125.74 |
| 8 | Takahiko Kozuka | Japan | 196.38 | 7 | 67.48 | 6 | 128.90 |
| 9 | Shawn Sawyer | Canada | 187.18 | 10 | 60.79 | 7 | 126.39 |
| 10 | Wu Jialiang | China | 182.94 | 8 | 64.35 | 11 | 118.59 |
| 11 | Xu Ming | China | 169.17 | 12 | 49.08 | 10 | 120.09 |
| 12 | Kensuke Nakaniwa | Japan | 167.37 | 11 | 55.82 | 12 | 111.55 |
| 13 | Abzal Rakimgaliev | Kazakhstan | 138.88 | 13 | 43.17 | 13 | 95.71 |
| 14 | Tristan Thode | New Zealand | 115.99 | 14 | 42.16 | 16 | 73.83 |
| 15 | Luis Hernández | Mexico | 112.05 | 16 | 39.39 | 17 | 72.66 |
| 16 | Justin Pietersen | South Africa | 111.16 | 18 | 36.39 | 14 | 74.77 |
| 17 | Nicholas Fernandez | Australia | 109.77 | 15 | 41.14 | 20 | 68.63 |
| 18 | Joel Watson | New Zealand | 109.03 | 19 | 35.02 | 15 | 74.01 |
| 19 | Kevin Alves | Brazil | 108.12 | 17 | 37.05 | 18 | 71.07 |
| 20 | Robert McNamara | Australia | 102.23 | 21 | 32.42 | 19 | 69.81 |
| 21 | Humberto Contreras | Mexico | 95.50 | 20 | 34.20 | 21 | 61.30 |

=== Ladies ===
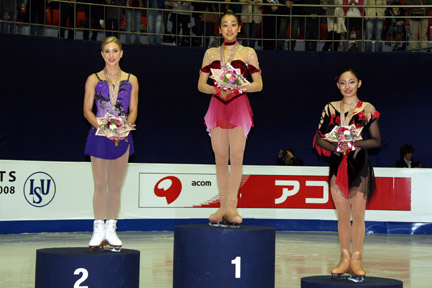
The ladies' podium. From left: Joannie Rochette (2nd), Mao Asada (1st), Miki Ando (3rd).

| Rank | Name | Nation | Total points | SP | | FS | |
|---|---|---|---|---|---|---|---|
| 1 | Mao Asada | Japan | 193.25 | 1 | 60.94 | 1 | 132.31 |
| 2 | Joannie Rochette | Canada | 179.54 | 3 | 60.04 | 2 | 119.50 |
| 3 | Miki Ando | Japan | 177.66 | 2 | 60.07 | 3 | 117.59 |
| 4 | Kim Na-young | South Korea | 158.49 | 6 | 53.08 | 4 | 105.41 |
| 5 | Mira Leung | Canada | 157.36 | 7 | 53.01 | 6 | 104.35 |
| 6 | Katrina Hacker | United States | 153.86 | 10 | 49.86 | 7 | 104.00 |
| 7 | Cynthia Phaneuf | Canada | 152.67 | 8 | 50.63 | 8 | 102.04 |
| 8 | Ashley Wagner | United States | 152.46 | 12 | 47.29 | 5 | 105.17 |
| 9 | Anastasia Gimazetdinova | Uzbekistan | 150.07 | 4 | 55.49 | 10 | 94.58 |
| 10 | Fumie Suguri | Japan | 145.06 | 9 | 50.24 | 9 | 94.82 |
| 11 | Beatrisa Liang | United States | 144.25 | 5 | 54.05 | 11 | 90.20 |
| 12 | Wang Yueren | China | 129.88 | 15 | 44.69 | 13 | 85.19 |
| 13 | Xu Binshu | China | 128.39 | 11 | 49.62 | 14 | 78.77 |
| 14 | Liu Yan | China | 124.09 | 16 | 37.33 | 12 | 86.76 |
| 15 | Melinda Sherilyn Wang | Chinese Taipei | 119.58 | 14 | 45.95 | 15 | 73.63 |
| 16 | Kim Chae-hwa | South Korea | 115.85 | 13 | 46.76 | 16 | 69.09 |
| 17 | Loretta Hamui | Mexico | 99.89 | 18 | 34.87 | 17 | 65.02 |
| 18 | Ana Cecilia Cantu | Mexico | 94.76 | 17 | 37.10 | 20 | 57.66 |
| 19 | Tina Wang | Australia | 94.28 | 21 | 30.57 | 18 | 63.71 |
| 20 | Lejeanne Marais | South Africa | 90.52 | 22 | 29.38 | 19 | 61.14 |
| 21 | Tamami Ono | Hong Kong | 88.96 | 20 | 31.97 | 21 | 56.99 |
| 22 | Gracielle Jeanne Tan | Philippines | 80.88 | 24 | 28.50 | 22 | 52.38 |
| 23 | Charissa Tansomboon | Thailand | 79.28 | 19 | 32.31 | 24 | 46.97 |
| 24 | Corenne Bruhns | Mexico | 76.89 | 23 | 28.63 | 23 | 48.26 |
Free Skating Not Reached
| 25 | Crystal Wynewyne Kiang | Chinese Taipei | | 25 | 28.12 | | |
| 26 | Abigail Pietersen | South Africa | | 26 | 27.44 | | |
| 27 | Morgan Figgins | New Zealand | | 27 | 26.92 | | |
| 28 | Phoebe Di Tommaso | Australia | | 28 | 25.76 | | |
| 29 | Siobhan McColl | South Africa | | 29 | 23.40 | | |
| 30 | Stacy Perfetti | Brazil | | 30 | 21.97 | | |
| 31 | Kristine Y. Lee | Hong Kong | | 31 | 20.53 | | |
| 32 | Tiffany Ting-Ye Wu | Chinese Taipei | | 32 | 18.64 | | |

=== Pairs ===
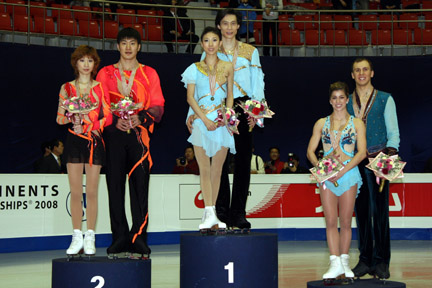
The pairs' podium. From left: Zhang Dan / Zhang Hao (2nd), Pang Qing / Tong Jian (1st), Brooke Castile / Benjamin Okolski (3rd).

| Rank | Name | Nation | Total points | SP | | FS | |
|---|---|---|---|---|---|---|---|
| 1 | Pang Qing / Tong Jian | China | 187.33 | 2 | 67.70 | 1 | 119.63 |
| 2 | Zhang Dan / Zhang Hao | China | 181.84 | 1 | 70.45 | 2 | 111.39 |
| 3 | Brooke Castile / Benjamin Okolski | United States | 159.99 | 4 | 56.44 | 3 | 103.55 |
| 4 | Rena Inoue / John Baldwin | United States | 156.00 | 3 | 57.40 | 4 | 98.60 |
| 5 | Jessica Miller / Ian Moram | Canada | 149.24 | 5 | 54.88 | 5 | 94.36 |
| 6 | Li Jiaqi / Xu Jiankun | China | 144.53 | 6 | 53.26 | 6 | 91.27 |
| 7 | Mylène Brodeur / John Mattatall | Canada | 141.46 | 7 | 52.50 | 7 | 88.96 |
| 8 | Tiffany Vise / Derek Trent | United States | 134.41 | 8 | 45.82 | 8 | 88.59 |
| 9 | Marina Aganina / Dmitri Zobnin | Uzbekistan | 93.77 | 9 | 36.82 | 9 | 56.95 |

=== Ice dancing ===
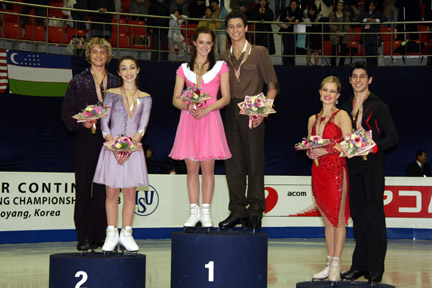
The ice dancing podium. From left: Meryl Davis / Charlie White (2nd), Tessa Virtue / Scott Moir (1st), Kimberly Navarro / Brent Bommentre (3rd).

| Rank | Name | Nation | Total points | CD | | OD | | FD | |
|---|---|---|---|---|---|---|---|---|---|
| 1 | Tessa Virtue / Scott Moir | Canada | 207.32 | 1 | 38.22 | 1 | 65.02 | 1 | 104.08 |
| 2 | Meryl Davis / Charlie White | United States | 199.45 | 2 | 37.36 | 2 | 61.93 | 2 | 100.16 |
| 3 | Kimberly Navarro / Brent Bommentre | United States | 180.65 | 3 | 34.36 | 3 | 56.67 | 3 | 89.62 |
| 4 | Jennifer Wester / Daniil Barantsev | United States | 174.37 | 4 | 30.95 | 4 | 55.44 | 5 | 87.98 |
| 5 | Kaitlyn Weaver / Andrew Poje | Canada | 174.36 | 5 | 30.94 | 5 | 54.95 | 4 | 88.47 |
| 6 | Allie Hann-McCurdy / Michael Coreno | Canada | 164.02 | 6 | 29.73 | 6 | 50.53 | 6 | 83.76 |
| 7 | Cathy Reed / Chris Reed | Japan | 158.47 | 7 | 27.06 | 7 | 49.64 | 7 | 81.77 |
| 8 | Yu Xiaoyang / Wang Chen | China | 148.19 | 8 | 25.61 | 8 | 45.60 | 8 | 76.98 |
| 9 | Huang Xintong / Zheng Xun | China | 147.02 | 9 | 25.22 | 9 | 45.35 | 9 | 76.45 |
| 10 | Danielle O'Brien / Gregory Merriman | Australia | 121.86 | 11 | 21.26 | 10 | 37.44 | 10 | 63.16 |
| 11 | Guo Jiameimei / Meng Fei | China | 112.29 | 12 | 20.96 | 11 | 36.80 | 12 | 54.53 |
| 12 | Yu Sun Hye / Ramil Sarkulov | Uzbekistan | 109.56 | 10 | 22.46 | 13 | 33.78 | 13 | 53.32 |
| 13 | Maria Borounov / Evgeni Borounov | Australia | 107.52 | 13 | 17.78 | 12 | 34.93 | 11 | 54.81 |
