= Ekaterina Kozireva =

Russian figure skater

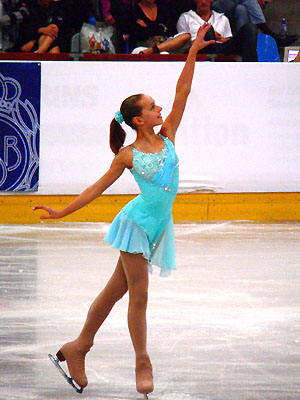
- Kozireva in 2006.

Personal information
- Native name: Екатерина Владимировна Козырева
- Full name: Ekaterina Vladimirovna Kozyreva
- Born: 16 February 1993 (age 33)

Figure skating career
- Country: Russia

Ekaterina Vladimirovna Kozireva (Russian: Екатерина Владимировна Козырева, born 16 February 1993) is a Russian former competitive figure skater. She won silver at the 2009 Golden Spin of Zagreb and bronze at the 2006 ISU Junior Grand Prix event held in Miercurea Ciuc, Romania. She was the second alternate to the 2006 Junior Grand Prix Final.

== Competitive highlights ==
International
Event	05–06	06–07	07–08	08–09	09–10	10–11
Golden Spin					2nd	
NRW Trophy				8th		
Winter Universiade						WD
International: Junior
JGP Croatia			9th			
JGP Germany			9th		5th	
JGP Italy				9th		
JGP Netherlands		4th				
JGP Romania		3rd				
JGP Turkey					7th	
National
Russian Champ.		6th	13th	9th	11th	
Russian Jr. Champ.	12th	11th	5th	11th		
JGP = Junior Grand Prix; WD = Withdrew
