= Emily Hughes =

American figure skater

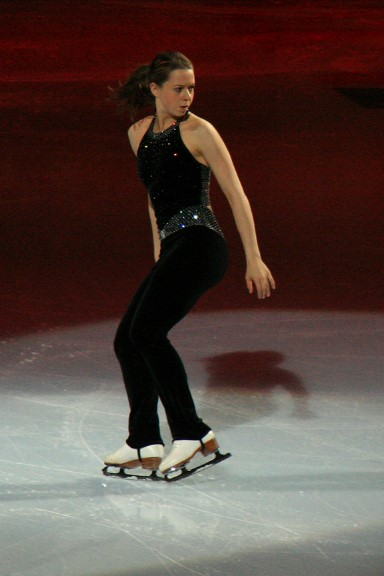
- Emily Hughes in 2006

Personal information
- Full name: Emily Anne Hughes
- Born: January 26, 1989 (age 37) Great Neck, New York
- Height: 5 ft 6 in (168 cm)

Figure skating career
- Country: United States
- Coach: Bonni Retzkin, Mark Mitchell, Peter Johansson
- Skating club: SC of New York
- Began skating: 1993
- Retired: 2010
Medal record
Representing United States
Figure skating: Ladies' singles
Four Continents Championships
Silver medal – second place	2007 Colorado Springs	Ladies' singles
World Junior Championships
Bronze medal – third place	2005 Kitchener	Ladies' singles

Emily Anne Hughes (born January 26, 1989) is an American former figure skater. She is the 2007 Four Continents silver medalist and 2007 U.S. national silver medalist. She competed at the 2006 Winter Olympics, finishing 7th.

== Personal life ==
Hughes was born in Great Neck, New York. Her father, John Hughes, was a Canadian of Irish descent, and was the captain of the NCAA champion 1969–70 Cornell University ice hockey team. Her mother, Amy Pastarnack, is Jewish and is a breast cancer survivor. Hughes has supported a variety of causes for breast cancer research and awareness, including Skating for Life, a television special that she promoted on NBC's Today show. She has five siblings. Her older sister, Sarah, is the 2002 Olympic figure skating champion, and her older brother, Matt, became an NYPD officer.

In 2002, Hughes cowrote a book in Random House's Young Dreamers series, I Am a Skater. On December 18, 2005, she was the subject of a cover story in the Sunday New York Times Magazine. She graduated from Great Neck North High School in June 2007, and announced on April 26, 2007 that she would attend Harvard University starting in fall 2007. Hughes had a concentration in sociology with a minor in government, and graduated as a member of the class of 2011.

In 2010, Hughes served as a legislative intern with the United States Senate. Starting in February 2012, she began employment with Deloitte Consulting in New York City as a business analyst. She left Deloitte in September 2013 and began working for the International Olympic Committee in Lausanne, Switzerland. She married Amit Mukherjee on September 2, 2017.

== Skating career ==
=== Early years ===
Hughes began learning to skate in 1993. In the 2001–2002 season, she qualified for her first U.S. Figure Skating Championships and placed 11th in the junior ladies' category. She repeated that placement the following season. She placed 5th on the junior level at the 2003–2004 Eastern Sectional Championships and so did not qualify for the 2004 U.S. Championships.

=== 2004–2005 season ===
Hughes moved up to the senior level nationally. She won her regional championship and placed second at Eastern Sectionals to qualify for the 2005 U.S. Figure Skating Championships. She placed 6th and was named to the team to the 2005 World Junior Championships. It was her first international competition and she won the bronze medal.

=== 2005–2006 season ===
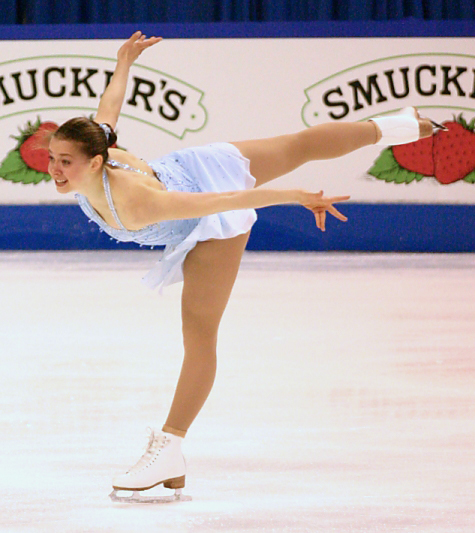
Hughes performs a spiral at the 2005 World Juniors.

In early August 2005, Hughes spent nearly a week in hospital due to viral meningitis. She debuted on the Grand Prix series, placing fifth at both of her assignments. Hughes won the bronze medal at the 2006 U.S. Championships and was named as first alternate for a spot in the U.S. Olympic team. After Michelle Kwan's withdrawal, Hughes was added to the U.S. team at the 2006 Winter Olympics. She flew to Turin and placed 7th. She then competed at the 2006 World Championships, placing 8th.

=== 2006–2007 season ===
Hughes won her first Grand Prix medal, taking bronze at the 2006 Cup of China. She won silver at the 2007 U.S. Championships and then took silver at the 2007 Four Continents Championships. She placed 9th at the 2007 World Championships.

=== 2007–2008 season ===
Hughes switched from long-time coach Bonni Retzkin to Mark Mitchell and Peter Johansson at the Skating Club of Boston. She placed fourth at both of her Grand Prix events. On January 15, 2008, it was announced that Hughes would not compete in the 2008 U.S. Championships due to a hip injury that prevented her from training and competing.

=== 2008–2009 season ===
Hughes began her season at the North Atlantic Regional Championships, where she took the bronze medal. She qualified for the Eastern Sectionals but received a bye to the 2009 U.S. Championships due to her Grand Prix assignment. Hughes placed 9th at the 2008 Trophée Eric Bompard Grand Prix event.

On January 19, 2009, Hughes announced her withdrawal from the 2009 U.S. Figure Skating Championships due to an ankle injury.

=== 2009–2010 season ===
Later that year, Hughes took a semester off from Harvard in an attempt to qualify for the 2010 Winter Olympics. She specifically noted she wanted to qualify for the 2010 games so she could experience the opening ceremony, something she missed in 2006 since she was a late replacement to the team. In January 2010, she placed 9th at the 2010 U.S. Championships, which meant that she did not receive one of the two available Olympic spots.

== Programs ==
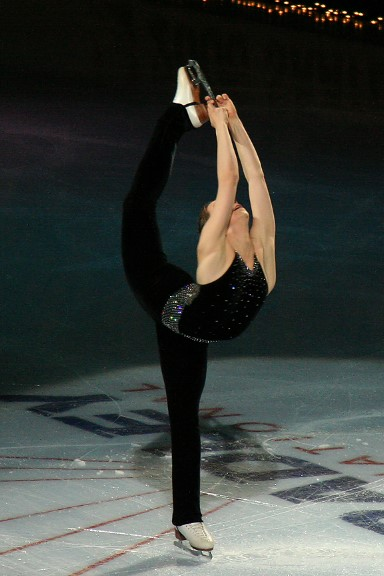
Hughes performs a Biellmann spin during her Proud Mary exhibition at the 2006 Skate America.

Season	Short program	Free skating	Exhibition
2009–2010	Caprice Bohemien by Sergei Rachmaninoff	Gone with the Wind by Max Steiner	
2008–2009	I Got Rhythm by George Gershwin	Gone with the Wind by Max Steiner	
2007–2008	I Got Rhythm by George Gershwin	Carmina Burana suite by Carl Orff	
2006–2007	Carmen by Georges Bizet	Sylvia by Léo Delibes	Proud Mary by John Fogerty performed by Tina Turner
2005–2006	Concerto in F Major for Piano & Orchestra (Allegro) by George Gershwin	The Seasons by Alexander Glazunov	
2004–2005	Concerto in F Major for Piano & Orchestra (Allegro) by George Gershwin	The Sleeping Beauty by Pyotr Ilyich Tchaikovsky	Don't Wanna Lose You by Gloria Estefan

== Competitive highlights ==
International
Event	01–02	02–03	04–05	05–06	06–07	07–08	08–09	09–10
Olympics				7th				
Worlds				8th	9th			
Four Continents					2nd			
GP Bompard							9th	
GP Cup of China					3rd			
GP Cup of Russia				5th				
GP Skate America				5th	5th	4th		7th
GP Skate Canada						4th		
International: Junior
Junior Worlds			3rd					
National
U.S. Champ.	11th J	11th J	6th	3rd	2nd			9th
J = Junior

== See also ==
- List of Jewish figure skaters
