= Benjamin Okolski =

American pair skater (born 1984)

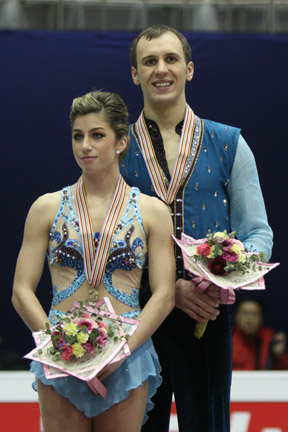
- Castile and Okolski in 2008

Personal information
- Born: November 12, 1984 (age 41) Tucson, Arizona, U.S.
- Height: 5 ft 11 in (1.80 m)

Figure skating career
- Country: United States
- Skating club: Arctic FSC
- Began skating: 1993
- Retired: 2010
Medal record
Figure skating: Pairs
Representing United States
Four Continents Championships
Bronze medal – third place	2008 Goyang	Pairs

Benjamin Okolski (born November 12, 1984) is an American former pair skater. With Brooke Castile, he is the 2008 Four Continents bronze medalist, 2007 Nebelhorn Trophy champion, and 2007 U.S. national champion.

== Early life and education ==
Benjamin Okolski was born in Tucson, Arizona. He initially studied engineering at Washtenaw Community College. After obtaining a master's degree in accounting from the University of Michigan, he became an auditor at Deloitte.

== Career ==
Okolski began skating at age eight and began pairs at twelve with his sister, Colleen. He teamed up with Brooke Castile after the 2002 U.S. Championships. They won two bronze medals on the ISU Junior Grand Prix series. They placed 7th at their first Four Continents in 2005. Following the 2006 U.S. Championships, Castile and Okolski changed coaches to Johnny Johns and Marina Zueva at the Arctic Figure Skating Club in Canton, Michigan. They won the 2007 U.S. Championships, earning them the right to compete at 2007 Four Continents, where they were 5th, and then to make their World debut, where they finished 12th.

In the 2007–08 season, Castile and Okolski were assigned to 2007 Nebelhorn Trophy, 2007 Skate America, and 2007 Trophée Eric Bompard, but withdrew from all three due to injury. They won bronze at the 2008 U.S. Championships and went on to win a bronze medal in their third Four Continents appearance. They finished 11th at their second World Championships.

In 2008–09, they also withdrew from their Grand Prix assignments, 2008 Cup of China and 2008 Cup of Russia, due to injury. They finished 5th at the 2009 U.S. Championships.

In the 2009–10 season, Castile and Okolski were 6th at 2009 Skate America. Their 4th-place finish at the 2010 U.S. Championships meant they did not make the U.S. team to the 2010 Winter Olympics. They announced their retirement from competitive skating in May 2010.

== Programs ==
(with Castile)

Season	Short program	Free skating
2009–10	Samba Pa Ti by Carlos Santana	Clair de Lune by Claude Debussy
2008–09	Memoirs of a Geisha by John Williams	Clair de Lune by Claude Debussy
2007–08	Scheherezade by Nikolai Rimsky-Korsakov	L'Arena (from Kill Bill: Volume 2) by Ennio Morricone
2006–07	Shine on You Crazy Diamond by Pink Floyd	Requiem for a Dream by Clint Mansell
2004–06	Anticipation by Luciani	Romeo and Juliet (soundtrack)
2003–04	Ave Maria	Romeo and Juliet (soundtrack)

== Competitive highlights ==
GP: Grand Prix; JGP: Junior Grand Prix

=== With Colleen Okolski ===
National
Event	2001	2002
U.S. Championships	4th N	5th N
N = Novice level

=== With Brooke Castile ===
International
Event	02–03	03–04	04–05	05–06	06–07	07–08	08–09	09–10
Worlds					12th	11th		
Four Continents			7th		5th	3rd		
GP Bompard				6th		WD		
GP Cup of China							WD	
GP Cup of Russia				8th			WD	
GP Skate America						WD		6th
Nebelhorn Trophy					1st	WD		4th
International: Junior
Junior Worlds		9th						
JGP Bulgaria		4th						
JGP China			5th					
JGP France			3rd					
JGP Japan		3rd						
JGP United States	6th							
National
U.S. Champ.	6th J	2nd J	7th	8th	1st	3rd	5th	4th
J = Junior level; WD = Withdrew
