= Mark Mitchell (American figure skater) =

American figure skater (born 1968)

Personal information
- Born: May 2, 1968 (age 58)

Figure skating career
- Country: United States

Mark Mitchell (born May 2, 1968) is an American retired competitive figure skater. He is a three-time medalist at the United States Figure Skating Championships and placed as high as fourth at the World Figure Skating Championships (in 1993). After retiring from competition, he began work as a coach and choreographer in Boston with his husband, Peter Johansson. As of 2022, he lived in Provincetown with Johansson.

== Biography ==
=== Skating career ===
Mitchell was the 1986 U.S. Junior National Champion. He won the bronze medal at the 1990 United States Figure Skating Championships, but was not named to the World team, despite the U.S. having three spots to that competition. Instead, a medical bye was given to Christopher Bowman who withdrew from the competition with a back injury.

Mitchell finished 4th at the 1991 United States Figure Skating Championships, again just missing a spot on the World team.

In 1992, he won a bronze medal at the United States Figure Skating Championships. The US had three spots for the team to the 1992 Winter Olympics. However, Mitchell was not placed on the team due to a medical bye given to Todd Eldredge. Mitchell competed at the 1992 World Figure Skating Championships, where he placed 5th, ahead of Eldredge.

In 1993, he finished 2nd at the United States Figure Skating Championships, and was selected for the World team. At Worlds, he received a perfect score of 6.0 for presentation in his short program, and was in 2nd place after this portion of the competition behind Kurt Browning. In the free skate, he fell to 4th place overall, and as a result, the United States had two skater slots for the 1994 Winter Olympics because the rules at that time required a country to medal at the previous year's World Championships to have three slots to the Olympics. This rule has since been amended.

After the 1993 Worlds, Mitchell moved to Milan, Italy to train with Carlo Fassi. Mitchell was vocal in his opposition to the reinstatement of professionals, such as Brian Boitano. Subsequently, at the 1994 United States Figure Skating Championships he fell to 5th place and did not qualify for the 1994 Olympics.

Mitchell turned professional following the 1993–1994 season. Throughout his amateur and professional career, Mitchell toured with Champions on Ice.

=== Coaching career ===
Mitchell currently works as a coach with former Swedish national champion Peter Johansson at the Skating Club of Boston. Their students include 2012 Skate America Silver Medalist Christina Gao, 2010 U.S. National Junior Silver Medalist Yasmin Siraj, 2007 World Junior champion Stephen Carriere, 2008 Eastern Sectional champion Katrina Hacker, 2007 US National junior pewter medalist Curran Oi, 2007 Eastern Sectional champion Kylie Gleason, two time Junior Grand Prix gold medalist Juliana Cannarozzo, 2008 US National junior bronze medalist Brittney Rizo, 2007 Canadian Junior Champion Dana Zhalko-Tytarenko, and 2009 US National Junior Champion Ross Miner. They formerly coached 2003 U.S. pewter medalist Scott Smith, 2007 US National silver medalist Emily Hughes, 2004 US National Junior silver medalist Jason Wong, 2003 US National Novice bronze medalist Jessica Houston, and 2003 US National Junior Champion Erica Archambault.

Mitchell and Johansson were the 2003, 2006, and 2007 USFSA/PSA Developmental Coaches of the Year and the 2006 USOC Developmental Coaches of the Year.

== Competitive highlights ==
International
Event	84–85	85–86	86–87	87–88	88–89	89–90	90–91	91–92	92–93	93–94
Worlds								5th	4th	
Skate America						4th			3rd	
Skate Canada							3rd			2nd
Int. de Paris									1st	
Nations Cup								1st		
Novarat Trophy			3rd		1st					
National
U.S. Champ.	11th J	1st J	15th	13th	8th	3rd	4th	3rd	2nd	5th
Olympic Festival						1st				
Eastern Sect.						1st				
