= Tamami Ono =

Japanese figure skater (born 1989)

Personal information
- Born: November 21, 1989 (age 36)
- Height: 1.61 m (5 ft 3 1/2 in)

Figure skating career
- Country: Hong Kong
- Coach: Ying Zhao
- Skating club: Hong Kong Skating Union

Tamami Ono (Japanese: 小野珠実, Chinese: 小野珠實, born November 21, 1989, in Chiba, Japan) is a Japanese figure skater who competed for Hong Kong during her entire career. She is the 2005 & 2006 Hong Kong national champion and 2004 junior national champion. She qualified to the free skate at the 2008 and 2009 Four Continents Championships.
