= Jennifer Wester =

American ice dancer and visual artist

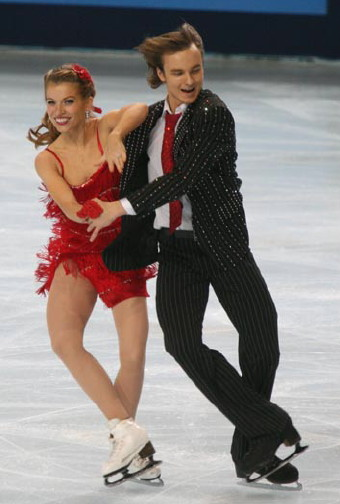
- Wester/Barantsev at the 2008 Trophée Eric Bompard

Personal information
- Full name: Jennifer Nicole Wester
- Born: February 27, 1985 (age 41) Dallas, Texas, U.S.
- Home town: Dallas, Texas, U.S.
- Height: 5 ft 5 in (1.65 m)

Figure skating career
- Country: United States
- Partner: Daniil Barantsev
- Skating club: Dallas FSC
- Began skating: 1997
- Retired: 2015

Jennifer Nicole Wester (born February 27, 1985) is a visual artist and former American ice dancer. With partner Daniil Barantsev, she is the 2007 Nebelhorn Trophy champion, 2008 ISU Four Continents 4th place finisher, and 2008 World Championship first alternates for Team USA.

Wester retired from competitive skating in the 2009-2010 season due to injury. However, she continued skating professionally as a pro on ABC's Skating with the Stars in 2010 as partner to Vince Neil, and in RaiUno's Notti Sul Ghiaccio in 2015 as partner to Emanuele Filiberto Di Savoia.

Wester graduated from Yale University with a degree in Computing and the Arts in 2016 and received an MFA in Studio Art from Southern Methodist University in 2021.

== Personal life ==
Jennifer Wester was born February 27, 1985, in Dallas, Texas. She has a B.A. from Yale University in the intersection of Computer Science and Fine Art (Computing and the Arts) (2016) and an M.F.A. in Studio Art from Southern Methodist University.

Wester was married to Daniil Barantsev. They have two sons, Anden Daniel Barantsev, born on December 29, 2011, and Devin Daniel Barantsev, born in July, 2014. As of 2016, the couple split ways.

Wester took up metal sculpture during her time at Yale among other artistic practices. She has a website dedicated to her work as an interdisciplinary artist: jenniferwester.info.

Notable events include:
SOLUNA Festival, 2018
Aurora Expanded, 2018

== Career ==
=== Early years in skating and skating career until 2002 ===
Wester began skating as cross-training for shooting sports after her father read that skating could enhance her balance and thus improve her shooting skills. Soon after stepping on the ice however, she changed her focus from shooting to skating. She started skating at the America's Ice Gardens in Dallas, Texas in the fall of 1996, under coach Monica Reyes.

Wester began ice dancing in the spring of 1999, partnered with Nicholas Hart on the junior level. Their partnership dissolved in October of the same year. Wester continued ice dancing, testing through her US Gold Medal by the following summer. She then partnered with Italy's Massimo Scali and trained with him in Milan, Italy. They skated in shows throughout 2000 in Europe but never competed together due to international skating regulations.

Wester returned to the United States in the spring of 2001. In 2002, she competed on the Junior level with Jonathan Harris at the US National Championships. However, that partnership ended immediately following that competition — the same time Wester underwent shoulder surgery to repair a torn ligament.

=== 2003–2009: Partnership with Barantsev ===
Wester teamed up with Daniil Barantsev in Newington, Connecticut, in March 2003. She underwent surgery on her shoulder in 2003 and again in 2004.

Skating association paperwork issues prevented Wester/Barantsev from competing nationally until 2005. As a result of ISU paperwork regulations, they remained ineligible for international competitions until the Russian Skating Federation granted Barantsev a release, in January 2007. In the same month, Wester injured her knee in a practice immediately prior to the 2007 U.S. Championships, where they finished sixth. Initially believed to be a severe bone bruise, her injury was diagnosed in April 2007 as a fractured patella requiring immediate surgery.

In the summer of 2007, Wester/Barantsev moved to Bloomfield Hills, Michigan, to train at the Detroit Skating Club under the tutelage of Anjelika Krylova and Pasquale Camerlengo. Recovering slowly from her injury, Wester returned to the ice around mid-June 2007. In September, the duo won gold at the 2007 Nebelhorn Trophy, skating in their first international competition as a team.

Wester/Barantsev placed fourth at their first ISU Championship together, the 2008 Four Continents Championships. In autumn 2008, they debuted on the Grand Prix series, Wester competing with pneumonia.

A back injury to Barantsev led them to withdraw from the U.S. Championships in January 2009 and Wester underwent knee surgery later that year. The two did not compete the following season and retired from competition shortly thereafter.

=== Later skating career ===
In 2010, Wester was cast on ABC's primetime television series Skating with the Stars as the professional skating partner for Vince Neil. In the spring of 2011, she and Barantsev began running the Newington Arena Learn to Skate School at the Newington Arena in Newington, Connecticut. She performed, partnering Ruslan Goncharov, at the 2012 Tribute to Life Charity Exhibition at Newington Arena in support of the Helen & Harry Gray Cancer Center at Hartford Hospital. In 2015, Wester joined the cast of Notti Sul Ghiaccio produced by Endemol and Rai, as the coach and professional partner of Emanuele Filiberto di Savoia. See Clip Reels from each show here: 2010 Skating With the Stars 2015 Notti Sul Ghiaccio

=== Art career ===
In 2016, Wester launched a career in fine art after graduating from Yale University. Her first solo show was in metal sculpture at Life in Deep Ellum's Umbrella Gallery.

In 2017, Wester began appearing in various art venues painting on canvas while skating on inline roller skates designed to act as figure skates. In December 2017 she also debuted an audio/visual/projection art featuring the sounds of skating as a musical composition in collaboration with percussion artist and professional figure skater, Marco Garavaglia.

In 2018, Wester performed a new work commissioned for the SOLUNA Festival entitled, Breaking Shadows, in which she designed and skated to the movements of shadows, accompanied by an original musical composition of skating sounds and classical instrumentation in collaboration with Dutch sound artist, Baz Laakakers.
Wester's work is often produced in collaboration with other artists. She has worked with Turkish born, Dallas-based artist, Can Turkyilmaz and New Hampshire born, Dallas-based artist, photographer, and event producer, Erica Felicella, among others.

=== Non-profit sector ===
Wester is highly active in the non-profit sector, sitting on boards, committees and volunteering. She has served multiple terms on various committees of USFigureSkating, on the executive committee of Art Conspiracy, on the board of the East Kessler Park Neighborhood Association, as the Executive Director of ArborCreek Montessori Academy ArborCreek Montessori Academy, and volunteers with other organizations.

=== Education and publishing ===
In March 2017, Wester began authoring a Montessori-inspired activity workbook series, Artistic Refinement Therapy Books & Exercises (ARTb) and speaking at Montessori conferences with regard to the subject of creative growth and development.

She was also featured on a podcast series Total Life Complete and began co-hosting a web-based video series titled B-side on LinkedIn.

== Programs ==
(with Barantsev)

| Season | Original dance | Free dance | Exhibition |
|---|---|---|---|
| 2008–2009 | Too Darn Hot by Cole Porter | Requiem for a Tower by Corner Stone Cues; Mythodea by Vangelis; Requiem for a Dream by Kronos Quartet | Rama Lama by Roslin Murphy |
| 2007–2008 | Cotton Eyed Joe; K and W Waltz; Cotton Eyed Joe | Singin' in the Rain by Arthur Freed | |
| 2006–2007 | Tango compilation by Astor Piazzolla | Singin' in the Rain by Arthur Freed | |
| 2005–2006 | Historia d'Amore; Samba de Bazil | Kalinka | |

== Competitive highlights ==
(with Barantsev)

International
| Event | 2005–06 | 2006–07 | 2007–08 | 2008–09 |
|---|---|---|---|---|
| Four Continents Champ. | | | 4th | |
| GP Trophée Éric Bompard | | | | 8th |
| GP Skate Canada | | | | 7th |
| Nebelhorn Trophy | | | 1st | |
National
| U.S. Championships | 7th | 6th | 5th | WD |
| Midwestern Sectionals | 1st | | 1st | |
GP = Grand Prix; WD = Withdrew

(with Harris)

| Event | 2002–03 |
|---|---|
| U.S. Championships | 9th J. |
| Midwestern Sectionals | 3rd J. |
J. = Junior level
