= Yasmin Siraj =

American figure skater

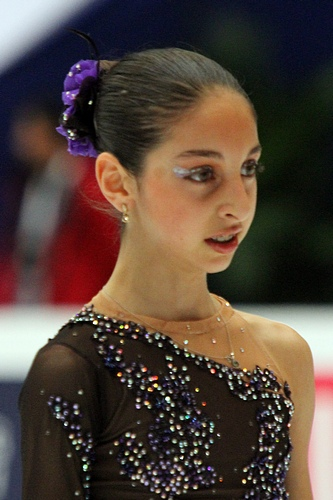
- Siraj in 2010

Personal information
- Born: July 30, 1996 (age 30) Boston, Massachusetts, U.S.
- Home town: Brookline, Massachusetts, U.S.
- Height: 5 ft 1 in (1.56 m)

Figure skating career
- Country: United States
- Coach: Mark Mitchell, Peter Johansson
- Skating club: Skating Club of Boston
- Began skating: 1998

Yasmin Siraj (born July 30, 1996) is an American former figure skater. She is the 2010 U.S. junior silver medalist and competed at the 2013 World Junior Championships.

== Career ==
Siraj began skating at the age of two, following her sister Layla. After taking Basic Skills classes at the Skating Club of Boston, she had private lessons with Sheryl Franks and Bobby and Barbie Martin until the age of eight when she joined coaches Mark Mitchell and Peter Johansson.

In 2010, Siraj won the junior silver medal at the U.S. Championships. The following season, she made her ISU Junior Grand Prix debut, winning two silver medals and qualifying for the JGP Final where she finished seventh. She placed eighth in her senior national debut at the 2011 U.S. Championships.

Siraj was 15th at the 2012 U.S. Nationals but rebounded the following year, finishing 6th at the 2013 U.S. Championships. She was sent to the 2013 World Junior Championships where she finished 11th.

In 2013, Siraj placed sixth at the Junior Grand Prix of Latvia, her only JGP assignment of the season. She won gold for the third consecutive year at the New England Regionals, winning the competition by over 16 points.

In 2014, Siraj placed 16th at the 2014 U.S. Nationals, after which she retired. In 2017, she began skating with the award-winning synchronized skating team, the Haydenettes.

== Personal life ==
Yasmin Siraj was born in Boston and grew up in Brookline. Her mother Aban Makarechian, is an architect of Iranian descent, and her father Ra'ad Siraj, is managing director of The Bank of New York Mellon of Saudi Arabian background. She has an elder sister, Layla, and younger brother, Amir Siraj.

In addition to skating, Siraj has also been a competitive pianist. She won awards at the American Fine Arts Festival and performed three times at Carnegie Hall.

Siraj attended Brookline High School, graduating in 2014. She subsequently attended Harvard College, where The Harvard Crimson, the daily student newspaper, named her one of the fifteen most interesting seniors of 2017-18.

== Competitive highlights ==
International
Event	09–10	10–11	11–12	12–13	13–14	14–15
Junior Worlds				11th		
JGP Final		7th				
JGP France		2nd				
JGP Latvia			5th		6th	
JGP U.K.		2nd				
National
U.S. Champ.	2nd J.	8th	15th	6th	16th	
U.S. Collegiate Champ.						3rd

== Programs ==
Season	Short program	Free skating	Exhibition
2013–2014	Flower Duet (from the opera Lakmé) by Léo Delibes	Seven Years in Tibet by John Williams	
2012–2013	Daphnis et Chloé by Maurice Ravel	Seven Years in Tibet by John Williams	
2011–2012	Daphnis et Chloé by Maurice Ravel	Misa Tango by Luis Bacalov	
2010–2011	Czardas by Vittorio Monti	Misa Tango by Luis Bacalov	
2009–2010	Fantaisie-Impromptu by Frédéric Chopin	Song of India by Nikolai Rimsky-Korsakov	
2008–2009	Slumdog Millionaire	Song of India by Nikolai Rimsky-Korsakov	
2007–2008		Istanbul (Not Constantinople) by Jimmy Kennedy and Nat Simon	
