= Skating Club of Boston =

Skating club in Norwood, Massachusetts

Coordinates: 42.363618°N 71.136947°W

The Skating Club of Boston
- Formation: 1912
- Location: Norwood, Massachusetts
- President: Ann Buckley
- Vice President: Kelly Requadt
- Executive Director: Doug Zeghibe
- Affiliations: U.S. Figure Skating
- Website: www.scboston.org

The Skating Club of Boston is a 501(c)(3) non-profit figure skating club based in Norwood, Massachusetts. Founded in 1912, it is one of the oldest skating clubs in the United States, and a founding member of U.S. Figure Skating, the governing body for the sport in the United States. The Club's mission is to advance participation, education and excellence in skating for people of all ages, abilities and means. The Club has over 800 active members and offers a variety of programs for the public, reaching another 2,000 children and adults. The club built its own rink in Brighton, Massachusetts in 1938 and remained there until moving to the Norwood facility in 2020. In addition, in a public private partnership with the City of Boston's Parks & Recreation Department, the Club manages the programming and facilities for The Frog Pond located at Boston Common on a year-round basis.

== Facility ==
The club's current facility, located on University Avenue in Norwood, Massachusetts, officially opened to the public in September 2020, delayed from June 2020 due to the COVID-19 pandemic. The facility features three rinks including the Tenley E. Albright Performance Center, a 2,500-seat Olympic-sized arena named for the Olympic champion and Club member. Two of the club's three rinks are used exclusively for figure skating, a rarity as most skating rinks are shared between figure skating and hockey.

In addition to the ice surfaces, the club's facility is home to a gym, sports rehabilitation and off-ice conditioning center, dance studio, café, and academic center. Also within the facility is Home Ice, a store for skate fitting, sharpening, and apparel.

== Club activities ==
Like many other skating clubs in North America, The Skating Club of Boston includes many social and volunteer activities along with skater development and athlete training. These include special dinners acknowledging volunteers, awards banquets celebrating skater achievements and competitions, and special exhibitions supporting community programs and athlete development. The Club supports a junior activities program encouraging leadership and community activities with its junior members.

The Boston Open is held annually in September and attracts skaters from across New England. Every spring the club showcases its many talented skaters in Ice Chips, the longest continuous run of any skating carnival in the world. In addition to the skaters training for local, national, and world competitions, the Club programming includes several of its own Theatre On Ice teams and provides a high performance skating program for youth interested in accelerated training, both on and off the ice. The club is affiliated with Team Excel, a synchronized skating organization.

The Club has hosted the United States Figure Skating Championships seven times, most recently in January 2014. In 2016, the Club hosted the ISU World Figure Skating Championships, a first for the city of Boston. The Club also hosted the 2011 U.S. Synchronized Skating Championships and the 2013 ISU World Synchronized Skating Championships.

== Notable members ==
A partial list of notable skaters who have trained at or represented The Skating Club of Boston include:

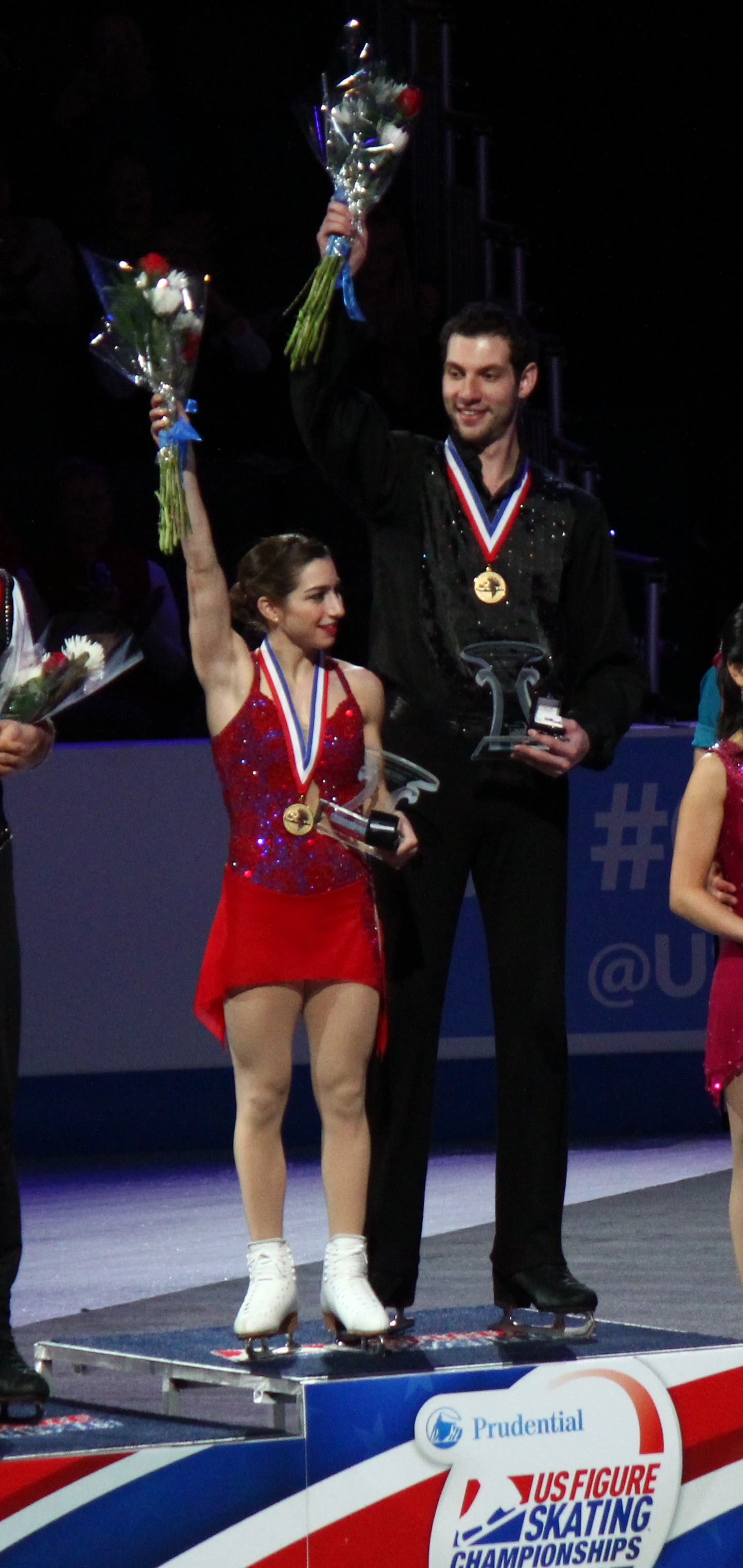
Marissa Castelli and Simon Shnapir stand atop the podium after becoming the 2013 U.S. Figure Skating Pairs Champions

- Tenley Albright
- Sherwin Badger
- Theresa Weld Blanchard
- Dick Button
- Juliana Cannarozzo
- Stephen Carriere
- Marissa Castelli
- Shepherd Clark
- Louann Donovan
- Christina Gao
- Lorraine Hanlon
- Emily Hughes
- Nancy Kerrigan
- Jennifer Kirk
- Bradley Lord
- Emmy Ma
- Jimmy Ma
- Gretchen Merrill
- Mark Mitchell
- Suna Murray
- Ross Miner
- Maxim Naumov
- Nathaniel Niles
- Albertina Noyes
- John Misha Petkevich
- Simon Shnapir
- Yasmin Siraj
- Scott Smith
- Joan Tozzer
- Suzanne Davis
- Roger F. Turner
- Laurence Owen
- Maribel Owen
- Maribel Vinson
- Paul Wylie

Notable former coaches at the club include Evgenia Shishkova and Vadim Naumov, 1994 ISU World Figure Skating Pair Champions, who were killed in the crash of American Eagle flight 5342, along with teenage skaters Jinna Han and Spencer Lane and their mothers, Jin Han and Christine Lane.

== Theatre On Ice of Boston ==
The Skating Club of Boston's Theatre On Ice program supports five full competitive teams. Theatre On Ice is a discipline of skating focusing on originality, costuming, artistry, musicality, and choreography.

The adult ice theatre team, Imagica of Boston, swept the gold medals (in the National Freeskate, International Choreographic Exercise, and International Freeskate events) at the 2008 and 2009 International/National Theatre on Ice competitions, and are the 2013 Nation's Cup Gold Medalists. Imagica of Boston is directed by Tasney Mazzarino. ACT I of Boston, is The Skating Club of Boston's Senior Theatre On Ice team. They are the 2013 U.S. National Theatre on Ice Gold Medal Champions. They have been selected to be one of three U.S. Senior Theatre On Ice teams to represent the U.S in Paris, France at the Nations Cup, International Interclub Ballet On Ice Competition in April 2015. ACT I of Boston is made up of a strong variety of skaters many of which have toured with Disney On Ice. The Ovation of Boston team consists of skaters 9 years or older, preliminary free skate level and above. Encore of Boston competes across the country, developing their theatrical and performance skating. The Center Stage of Boston team is the 2015 United States National Champions.

== The Skating Academy ==
The Skating Academy is the learn-to-skate school operated by The Skating Club of Boston, offering group lessons to children and adults at the Norwood facility with additional programs in several locations, including Brighton, Boston, Beverly, Brookline, Dedham, Foxboro, the Boston Common Frog Pond, Boston’s North End, Somerville and West Roxbury. The Academy has over 2,000 students, and utilizes the Basic Skills curriculum of U.S. Figure Skating and USA Hockey.

== Ice Chips ==
Ice Chips is The Skating Club of Boston’s annual figure skating show and the longest running club-produced ice show in the world. The show has showcased the world’s most outstanding figure skaters, including national, international and Olympic champions. The show encompasses a cast of over 480 skaters, including singles, pairs, ice dance, synchronized skating teams and Theatre On Ice teams. Since its inception, it has served as a showcase for the best figure skating talent in the world.

Ice Chips has paved the way for figure skating shows, bringing figure skating to the forefront of American entertainment and securing Boston as the center of figure skating in the United States.

The Skating Club of Boston is proud to have donated revenues from the shows to various charities over the last 80 years including:

- Boston Children’s Hospital
- Make-a-Wish Foundation
- Girl Scouts of Eastern Massachusetts
