= Megan Oster =

American figure skater

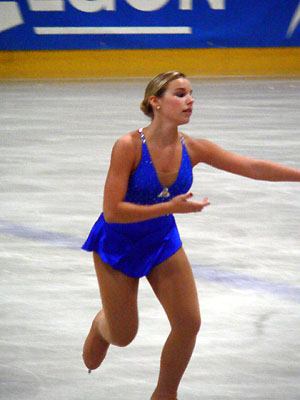
- Oster in 2006

Personal information
- Born: July 14, 1989 (age 37) Kenosha, Wisconsin, U.S.
- Height: 5 ft 3 in (1.60 m)

Figure skating career
- Country: United States
- Skating club: Wagon Wheel FSC
- Retired: July 1, 2008
Medal record
Figure skating: Ladies' singles
Representing United States
ISU Junior Grand Prix Final
Bronze medal – third place	2006–07 Sofia	Ladies' singles

Megan Oster (born July 14, 1989) is an American former competitive figure skater. She is the 2006–07 Junior Grand Prix Final bronze medalist.

For the 2007–08 season, Oster received two Grand Prix assignments, the 2007 Skate Canada International and 2007 NHK Trophy, but withdrew from both due to injury. She placed 5th at the Upper Great Lakes Regional Championships, and did not advance to Sectionals. She announced her retirement from competitive skating on July 1, 2008.

Oster is now married to Casey Boero of Waterford, Wisconsin.

== Programs ==
Season	Short program	Free skating
2007–08	Sarabande by George Frideric Handel	Mr. & Mrs. Smith by John Powell
2006–07	Gabriel's Oboe (from The Mission) by David Agnew	Baghdad by Jesse Cook
2005–06	Nights in White Satin by Moody Blues	The Untouchables by Ennio Morricone; Czardas by C. Macradi
2004–05	Nights in White Satin by Moody Blues	Rhapsody in Blue by George Gershwin

== Competitive history ==
GP: Grand Prix; JGP: Junior Grand Prix

International
Event	04–05	05–06	06–07	07–08
GP NHK Trophy				WD
GP Skate Canada				WD
International: Junior
JGP Final			3rd	
JGP Canada		2nd		
JGP Czech Republic			1st	
JGP Japan		11th		
JGP Netherlands			2nd	
JGP Ukraine	4th			
National
U.S. Champ.	3rd J	14th	11th	
