= Curran Oi =

American figure skater (born 1990)

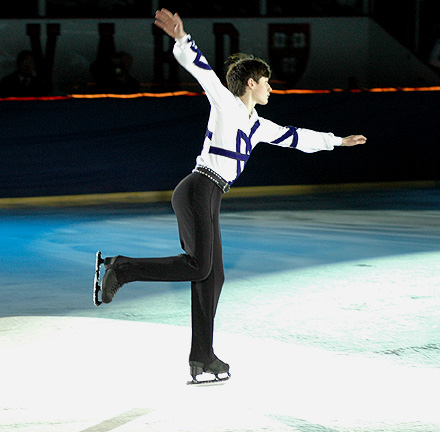

Personal information
- Born: October 19, 1990 (age 36) Boston, Massachusetts, U.S.
- Home town: Wellesley, Massachusetts, U.S.
- Height: 5 ft 7 in (1.69 m)

Figure skating career
- Country: United States
- Coach: Matthew Savoie
- Skating club: Yale FSC
- Began skating: 1996

Curran Oi (born October 19, 1990) is an American figure skater. He won two ISU Junior Grand Prix silver medals and placed fifth at the 2009 World Junior Championships. He is the founder of Stats on Ice, an online statistics database on figure skaters.

== Personal life ==
Oi was born on October 19, 1990, in Boston, Massachusetts. He is the brother of Bryna Oi, the 2011 Japanese national ice dancing champion with Taiyo Mizutani. His brother, Aidan Oi, competed in swimming and attended Boston University Academy.

Oi began attending the Massachusetts Institute of Technology in 2009, graduating in 2013 with a degree in nuclear engineering and physics. He then enrolled as a PhD student in biophysics at Yale University.

== Career ==
Oi began skating at age six after seeing the sport on television. He trained at the Skating Club of Boston under Mark Mitchell and Peter Johansson. He won a silver medal on the Junior Grand Prix circuit in his first year on it and placed 5th at the 2006 Junior Grand Prix Final.

Oi was selected for the 2008 and 2009 U.S. Figure Skating Scholastics Honors Team.

Oi announced that he would not compete in the 2009–10 season in order to focus on his studies. In 2014, he started skating again, and has been coached by Matthew Savoie once a week.

== Programs ==
Season	Short program	Free skating
2008–09	The Phantom of the Opera by Andrew Lloyd Webber	On the Waterfront by Leonard Bernstein
2007–08	The Phantom of the Opera by Andrew Lloyd Webber	Freedom by Michael W. Smith
2006–07	Children of Sanchez by Chuck Mangione	Freedom by Michael W. Smith

== Competitive highlights ==
JGP: ISU Junior Grand Prix

International
Event	05–06	06–07	07–08	08–09	15–16
Junior Worlds				5th	
JGP Final		5th			
JGP Belarus				5th	
JGP Estonia			6th		
JGP France		2nd			
JGP Italy				2nd	
JGP Norway		4th			
Gardena	1st J				
National
U.S. Champ.	3rd N	4th J	6th J	6th	18th
