= Suna Murray =

American figure skater

Personal information
- Born: April 16, 1955 (age 71) Tallahassee, Florida, U.S.

Figure skating career
- Country: United States
- Skating club: Skating Club of Boston
- Retired: 1972
Medal record
Ladies' figure skating
Representing the United States
North American Championships
Bronze medal – third place	1971 Peterborough	Ladies' singles

Suna Murray (born April 16, 1955, in Tallahassee, Florida) is an American former figure skater. She twice won a bronze medal at the U.S. Figure Skating Championships and competed at the 1972 Winter Olympics.

Murray coaches at the Skating Club of Boston. She is a national Technical Specialist. Her daughter Kylie Gleason, a five time US national competitor, graduated from Harvard in 2012 and is now the technology Director of Zearn. Her daughter Hadley Gleason, is a graduate of The University of Pennsylvania veterinary school. She played varsity hockey in college.

== Results ==
Event	1970	1971	1972
Winter Olympics			12th
World Championships		10th	8th
North American Championships		3rd	
U.S. Championships	6th	3rd	3rd
