= 2007 World Figure Skating Championships =

Annual figure skating competition held in 2007

- Type: ISU Championship
- Date: March 20 – 25
- Season: 2006–07
- Location: Tokyo, Japan
- Venue: Tokyo Metropolitan Gymnasium

Champions
- Men's singles: (France) Brian Joubert
- Ladies' singles: (Japan) Miki Ando
- Pairs: (China) Shen Xue / Zhao Hongbo
- Ice dance: (Bulgaria) Albena Denkova / Maxim Staviski
- Previous: 2006 World Championships
- Next: 2008 World Championships

The 2007 World Figure Skating Championships was a senior international figure skating competition sanctioned by the International Skating Union. Medals were awarded in the disciplines of men's singles, ladies' singles, pair skating, and ice dancing. The event was held at the Tokyo Metropolitan Gymnasium in Tokyo, Japan from March 20 to 25.

== Medals table ==
Rank	Nation	Gold	Silver	Bronze	Total
1	Japan (JPN)	1	2	0	3
2	China (CHN)	1	1	0	2
3	Bulgaria (BUL)	1	0	0	1
3	France (FRA)	1	0	0	1
5	Canada (CAN)	0	1	0	1
6	Germany (GER)	0	0	1	1
6	South Korea (KOR)	0	0	1	1
6	Switzerland (SUI)	0	0	1	1
6	United States (USA)	0	0	1	1
Totals (9 entries)		4	4	4	12

== Competition notes ==
The competition was open to skaters from ISU member nations who had reached the age of 15 by July 1, 2006. The corresponding competition for younger skaters was the 2007 World Junior Championships.

Based on the results of the 2006 World Championships, each country was allowed between one and three entries per discipline. National associations selected their entries based on their own criteria.

Due to the large number of entries at the World Championships, only the top 24 single skaters and top 20 pairs advanced to the free skating after the short program. In ice dancing, the top 30 couples in the compulsory dance advanced to the original dance, and the top 24 couples after the original dance advanced to the free dance.

Yukari Nakano and Carolina Kostner tied for 5th place with 168.92 points overall. Nakano finished 5th place on the tiebreak (free skating placement) and Kostner ended 6th. In the ladies' event, two world records were set: Yuna Kim for the short program with a score of 71.95, and Mao Asada for the free skating with a score of 133.13.

Shen Xue / Zhao Hongbo from China set a new world record of 71.07 points under the ISU Judging System for pairs' short program. Zhao proposed marriage to Shen on the ice following their free skating.

== Results ==
=== Men ===
Rank	Name	Nation	Total points	SP		FS	
1	Brian Joubert	France	240.85	1	83.64	3	157.21
2	Daisuke Takahashi	Japan	237.95	3	74.51	1	163.44
3	Stéphane Lambiel	Switzerland	233.35	6	72.70	2	160.65
4	Tomáš Verner	Czech Republic	226.25	9	70.45	4	155.80
5	Evan Lysacek	United States	222.18	5	73.49	5	148.69
6	Jeffrey Buttle	Canada	214.96	2	79.90	8	135.06
7	Nobunari Oda	Japan	209.94	14	67.17	6	142.77
8	Johnny Weir	United States	206.97	4	74.26	10	132.71
9	Kristoffer Berntsson	Sweden	206.29	15	66.09	7	140.20
10	Sergei Davydov	Belarus	203.05	8	70.72	12	132.33
11	Alban Préaubert	France	202.60	10	70.06	11	132.54
12	Stefan Lindemann	Germany	198.78	16	65.40	9	133.38
13	Christopher Mabee	Canada	195.38	7	71.33	14	124.05
14	Yannick Ponsero	France	192.63	12	68.76	15	123.87
15	Ryan Bradley	United States	188.90	19	62.88	13	126.02
16	Emanuel Sandhu	Canada	188.59	11	69.42	16	119.17
17	Karel Zelenka	Italy	180.10	17	63.81	17	116.29
18	Jamal Othman	Switzerland	178.39	18	63.71	20	114.68
19	Sergei Voronov	Russia	176.57	22	60.50	19	116.07
20	Andrei Lutai	Russia	175.46	24	59.37	18	116.09
21	Igor Macypura	Slovakia	174.94	21	61.25	22	113.69
22	Gregor Urbas	Slovenia	174.39	23	59.93	21	114.46
23	Wu Jialiang	China	170.10	13	67.70	24	102.40
24	Anton Kovalevski	Ukraine	169.27	20	61.61	23	107.66
Free Skating Not Reached
25	Ari-Pekka Nurmenkari	Finland		25	55.79		
26	Xu Ming	China		26	54.80		
27	Alper Uçar	Turkey		27	50.09		
28	Sean Carlow	Australia		28	49.73		
29	Christian Rauchbauer	Austria		29	49.19		
30	Trifun Zivanovic	Serbia		30	48.45		
31	Naiden Borichev	Bulgaria		31	46.69		
32	Sergei Kotov	Israel		32	43.99		
33	Przemysław Domański	Poland		33	42.51		
34	Lee Dong-whun	South Korea		34	42.00		
35	Javier Fernández	Spain		35	41.57		
36	Luis Hernández	Mexico		36	40.33		
37	Justin Pietersen	South Africa		37	39.73		
38	Boris Martinec	Croatia		38	37.09		
39	Zeus Issariotis	Greece		39	37.03		
40	Edward Ka-yin Chow	Hong Kong		40	34.63		
41	Zoltán Kelemen	Romania		41	33.71		
42	Joel Watson	New Zealand		42	30.09		

Referee:

- Paolo Pizzocari Italy

Technical Controller:

- Gale Tanger United States

Technical Specialist:

- Ricardo Olavarrieta Mexico

Assistant Technical Specialist:

- Margus Hernitz Estonia

Judges for the men's short program:

- Albert Zaydman Israel
- Nikolai Ianev Bulgaria
- Adriana Domanska Slovakia
- Nicolai Bellu Romania
- Alexei Shirshov Belarus
- Hermann Schulz Germany
- Sviatoslav Babenko Russia
- Neil Garrard South Africa
- Inger Andersson Sweden
- Claudia Fassora Italy
- Susan Johnson United States
- Ubavka Novakovic-Kutinou Serbia

Judges for the men's free skating:

- Nicolai Bellu Romania
- Philippe Meriguet France
- Inger Andersson Sweden
- Albert Zaydman Israel
- Patricia Houghton United Kingdom
- Claudia Fassora Italy
- Hermann Schulz Germany
- Nikolai Ianev Bulgaria
- Alexei Shirshov Belarus
- Susan Johnson United States
- Deborah Islam Canada
- Sviatoslav Babenko Russia

=== Ladies ===
Rank	Name	Nation	Total points	SP		FS	
1	Miki Ando	Japan	195.09	2	67.98	2	127.11
2	Mao Asada	Japan	194.45	5	61.32	1	133.13
3	Kim Yuna	South Korea	186.14	1	71.95	4	114.19
4	Kimmie Meissner	United States	180.23	4	64.67	3	115.56
5	Yukari Nakano	Japan	168.92	7	60.62	6	108.30
6	Carolina Kostner	Italy	168.92	3	67.15	9	101.77
7	Sarah Meier	Switzerland	160.80	9	58.52	8	102.28
8	Susanna Pöykiö	Finland	160.12	10	57.16	7	102.96
9	Emily Hughes	United States	159.06	6	60.88	13	98.18
10	Joannie Rochette	Canada	158.98	16	49.85	5	109.13
11	Valentina Marchei	Italy	153.60	14	51.88	10	101.72
12	Júlia Sebestyén	Hungary	153.50	8	59.98	15	93.52
13	Elena Sokolova	Russia	149.77	11	55.83	14	93.94
14	Kiira Korpi	Finland	149.47	17	49.63	11	99.84
15	Alissa Czisny	United States	147.74	18	49.43	12	98.31
16	Arina Martinova	Russia	145.28	12	54.69	16	90.59
17	Elene Gedevanishvili	Georgia	144.40	13	53.97	17	90.43
18	Jelena Glebova	Estonia	131.18	22	46.10	18	85.08
19	Anastasia Gimazetdinova	Uzbekistan	130.44	15	49.99	20	80.45
20	Joanne Carter	Australia	127.17	19	48.46	21	78.71
21	Idora Hegel	Croatia	125.66	24	44.91	19	80.75
22	Liu Yan	China	123.22	21	46.59	23	76.63
23	Tamar Katz	Israel	122.51	23	45.66	22	76.85
24	Mira Leung	Canada	120.74	20	47.05	24	73.69
Free Skating Not Reached
25	Kathrin Freudelsperger	Austria		25	42.24		
26	Lina Johansson	Sweden		26	41.87		
27	Tuğba Karademir	Turkey		27	41.79		
28	Irina Movchan	Ukraine		28	40.76		
29	Kristin Wieczorek	Germany		29	40.35		
30	Roxana Luca	Romania		30	39.65		
31	Anna Jurkiewicz	Poland		31	36.39		
32	Hristina Vassileva	Bulgaria		32	36.22		
33	Radka Bártová	Slovakia		33	36.17		
34	Isabelle Pieman	Belgium		34	35.12		
35	Ivana Hudziecová	Czech Republic		35	33.86		
36	Teodora Poštič	Slovenia		36	33.77		
37	Mérovée Ephrem	Monaco		37	33.01		
38	Maria-Elena Papasotiriou	Greece		38	32.90		
39	Jūlija Tepliha	Latvia		39	31.19		
40	Charissa Tansomboon	Thailand		40	30.46		
41	Jocelyn Ho	Chinese Taipei		41	30.41		
42	Ana Cecilia Cantu	Mexico		42	30.28		
43	Ksenia Jastsenjski	Serbia		43	27.56		
44	Ami Parekh	India		44	26.82		
45	Kristine Y. Lee	Hong Kong		45	23.57		

Referee:

- Marina Sanaya Russia

Technical Controller:

- Charles Cyr United States

Technical Specialist:

- Ravi Walia Canada

Assistant Technical Specialist:

- Isabel Duval de Navarre Germany

Judges for the ladies' short program:

- Katalin Balczo Hungary
- Robert Rosenbluth United States
- Lenka Bohunicka Slovakia
- Adriana Ordeanu Romania
- Antica Grubisic Croatia
- Chihee Rhee South Korea
- Osman Sirvan Turkey
- Franco Benini Italy
- Deborah Islam Canada
- Nikolai Salnikov Estonia
- Mona Jonsson Sweden
- Christiane Mörth Austria

Judges for the ladies' free skating:

- Adriana Ordeanu Romania
- Robert Rosenbluth United States
- Katalin Balczo Hungary
- Deborah Islam Canada
- Elisabeth Louesdon France
- Mona Jonsson Sweden
- Masako Kubota Japan
- Hely Abbondati Finland
- Elena Fomina Russia
- Lenka Bohunicka Slovakia
- Nikolai Salnikov Estonia
- Christiane Mörth Austria

=== Pairs ===
Rank	Name	Nation	Total points	SP		FS	
1	Shen Xue / Zhao Hongbo	China	203.50	1	71.07	1	132.43
2	Pang Qing / Tong Jian	China	188.46	3	66.75	2	121.71
3	Aliona Savchenko / Robin Szolkowy	Germany	187.39	2	67.65	3	119.74
4	Tatiana Volosozhar / Stanislav Morozov	Ukraine	173.62	8	57.62	5	116.00
5	Zhang Dan / Zhang Hao	China	173.39	10	57.00	4	116.39
6	Valérie Marcoux / Craig Buntin	Canada	167.25	5	60.73	6	106.52
7	Jessica Dubé / Bryce Davison	Canada	164.59	7	58.94	7	105.65
8	Rena Inoue / John Baldwin	United States	163.97	6	59.50	8	104.47
9	Yuko Kawaguchi / Alexander Smirnov	Russia	163.62	4	62.07	10	101.55
10	Anabelle Langlois / Cody Hay	Canada	160.01	13	55.96	9	104.05
11	Maria Mukhortova / Maxim Trankov	Russia	150.43	12	56.14	11	94.29
12	Brooke Castile / Benjamin Okolski	United States	139.00	14	54.51	13	84.49
13	Dominika Piątkowska / Dmitri Khromin	Poland	138.98	15	50.18	12	88.80
14	Marylin Pla / Yannick Bonheur	France	131.31	16	48.60	16	82.71
15	Angelika Pylkina / Niklas Hogner	Sweden	130.75	17	47.36	15	83.39
16	Laura Magitteri / Ondřej Hotárek	Italy	130.18	18	46.59	14	83.59
17	Stacey Kemp / David King	United Kingdom	126.95	19	44.96	17	81.99
18	Mari Vartmann / Florian Just	Germany	116.81	20	43.20	18	73.61
WD	Dorota Siudek / Mariusz Siudek	Poland		9	57.23		
WD	Maria Petrova / Alexei Tikhonov	Russia		11	56.36		
Free Skating Not Reached
21	Marina Aganina / Artem Knyazev	Uzbekistan		21	40.60		
22	Diana Rennik / Aleksei Saks	Estonia		22	40.04		

Referee:

- Igor Prokop Slovakia

Technical Controller:

- Alexander Lakernik Russia

Technical Specialist:

- David Kirby United Kingdom

Assistant Technical Specialist:

- David Moellenkamp Canada

Judges for the pairs short program:

- Chihee Rhee South Korea
- Anna Sierocka Poland
- Evgeni Rokhin Uzbekistan
- Yumin Wang China
- Jan Hoffmann Germany
- Florence Catry De Surmont France
- Vladislav Petukhov Ukraine
- Susan Heffernan Canada
- Linda Leaver United States
- Alexander Kogan Russia
- Alexander Penchev Bulgaria
- Simone Moore Australia

Judges for the pairs free skating:

- Christiane Mörth Austria
- Anna Sierocka Poland
- Simone Moore Australia
- Alexander Kogan Russia
- Lenka Bohunicka Slovakia
- Franco Benini Italy
- Nikolai Salnikov Estonia
- Yumin Wang China
- Susan Heffernan Canada
- Chihee Rhee South Korea
- Jan Hoffmann Germany
- Evgeni Rokhin Uzbekistan

=== Ice dancing ===
Rank	Name	Nation	Total points	CD		OD		FD	
1	Albena Denkova / Maxim Staviski	Bulgaria	201.61	2	37.42	1	62.10	1	102.09
2	Marie-France Dubreuil / Patrice Lauzon	Canada	200.46	1	38.96	3	60.54	2	100.96
3	Tanith Belbin / Benjamin Agosto	United States	195.43	5	37.17	2	61.85	4	96.41
4	Isabelle Delobel / Olivier Schoenfelder	France	195.19	4	37.20	5	58.82	3	99.17
5	Oksana Domnina / Maxim Shabalin	Russia	193.44	3	37.29	4	60.34	5	95.81
6	Tessa Virtue / Scott Moir	Canada	183.94	9	31.45	6	57.11	6	95.38
7	Meryl Davis / Charlie White	United States	179.14	10	31.15	8	55.82	7	92.17
8	Jana Khokhlova / Sergei Novitski	Russia	178.29	6	33.32	7	55.88	8	89.09
9	Federica Faiella / Massimo Scali	Italy	170.75	7	33.29	9	53.32	11	84.14
10	Melissa Gregory / Denis Petukhov	United States	170.08	11	30.83	10	53.15	9	86.10
11	Sinead Kerr / John Kerr	United Kingdom	167.14	8	32.09	11	51.51	12	83.54
12	Nathalie Péchalat / Fabian Bourzat	France	162.05	14	28.59	13	49.10	10	84.36
13	Anna Cappellini / Luca Lanotte	Italy	158.83	12	28.91	16	47.60	13	82.32
14	Alexandra Zaretski / Roman Zaretski	Israel	156.52	13	28.85	12	49.11	14	78.56
15	Nozomi Watanabe / Akiyuki Kido	Japan	152.21	15	28.46	17	47.27	15	76.48
16	Kristin Fraser / Igor Lukanin	Azerbaijan	152.10	16	28.07	14	48.13	16	75.90
17	Anna Zadorozhniuk / Sergei Verbillo	Ukraine	148.13	17	26.92	15	47.84	17	73.37
18	Nelli Zhiganshina / Alexander Gazsi	Germany	142.87	20	25.56	18	45.39	19	71.92
19	Grethe Grünberg / Kristian Rand	Estonia	141.55	23	23.72	19	45.13	18	72.70
20	Kaitlyn Weaver / Andrew Poje	Canada	140.14	18	25.76	23	42.58	20	71.80
21	Huang Xintong / Zheng Xun	China	138.44	19	25.61	22	43.91	21	68.92
22	Anastasia Grebenkina / Vazgen Azrojan	Armenia	137.07	21	25.04	21	44.86	23	67.17
23	Katherine Copely / Deividas Stagniūnas	Lithuania	136.63	24	23.46	20	44.87	22	68.30
24	Olga Akimova / Alexander Shakalov	Uzbekistan	130.58	22	24.20	24	41.43	24	64.95
Free Dance Not Reached
25	Barbora Silná / Dmitri Matsjuk	Austria	64.35	25	23.12	25	41.23		
26	Zsuzsanna Nagy / György Elek	Hungary	55.38	26	22.19	28	33.19		
27	Nicolette Amie House / Aidas Reklys	Lithuania	53.26	28	19.25	26	34.01		
28	Christa-Elizabeth Goulakos / Eric Neumann-Aubichon	Greece	53.13	29	19.18	27	33.95		
29	Laura Munana / Luke Munana	Mexico	52.35	27	20.30	29	32.05		

Referee:

- Mieko Fujimori Japan

Technical Controller:

- Gilles Vandenbroeck France

Technical Specialist:

- Andrzej Dostatni Poland

Assistant Technical Specialist:

- April Sargent Silverstein United States

Judges for the compulsory dance (rumba):

- Rossella Ceccattini Italy
- Irina Medvedeva Ukraine
- Alla Shekhovtseva Russia
- Garry Hoppe Israel
- Maria Miller Poland
- Shawn Rettstatt United States
- Jodi Abbott Canada
- Evgeni Rokhin Uzbekistan
- Hongguo Ren China
- Elizabeth Ryan Australia
- Olga Žáková Czech Republic
- Ulf Denzer Germany

Judges for the original dance:

- Maria Miller Poland
- Raia Bisserova-Bakalova Bulgaria
- Laimute Krauziene Lithuania
- Mayumi Kato Japan
- Alla Shekhovtseva Russia
- Elizabeth Ryan Australia
- Ulf Denzer Germany
- Irina Medvedeva Ukraine
- Jodi Abbott Canada
- Olga Žáková Czech Republic
- Rossella Ceccattini Italy
- Shawn Rettstatt United States

Judges for the free dance:

- Mayumi Kato Japan
- Elizabeth Ryan Australia
- Raia Bisserova-Bakalova Bulgaria
- Jodi Abbott Canada
- Shawn Rettstatt United States
- Maria Miller Poland
- Rossella Ceccattini Italy
- Hongguo Ren China
- Ulf Denzer Germany
- Olga Žáková Czech Republic
- Laimute Krauziene Lithuania
- Garry Hoppe Israel

== Multiple entries for 2008 ==
The following countries secured multiple entries for the 2008 championships based on their performances at the 2007 Worlds.

Spots	Men	Ladies	Pairs	Dance
3	France; Japan; United States	Japan; United States	Canada; China	Bulgaria; Canada; Russia; United States
2	Belarus; Canada; Czech Republic; Sweden; Switzerland	Canada; Finland; Italy; South Korea; Switzerland	Germany; Russia; Ukraine; United States	France; Italy

== Prize money ==
The total prize money for the 2007 World Figure Skating Championships is US$710,000. Pairs and dance teams split the money. All amounts are in US dollars. The breakdown is as follows:

Placement	Prize money (Singles)	Prize money (Pairs/Dance)
1st	$45,000	$67,500
2nd	$27,000	$40,500
3rd	$18,000	$27,000
4th	$13,000	$19,500
5th	$10,000	$15,000
6th	$7,000	$10,500
7th	$6,000	$9,000
8th	$5,000	$7,500
9th	$3,500	$5,250
10th	$3,000	$4,500
11th	$2,500	$3,750
12th	$2,000	$3,000
