= Keiffer Hubbell =

American ice dancer (born 1989)

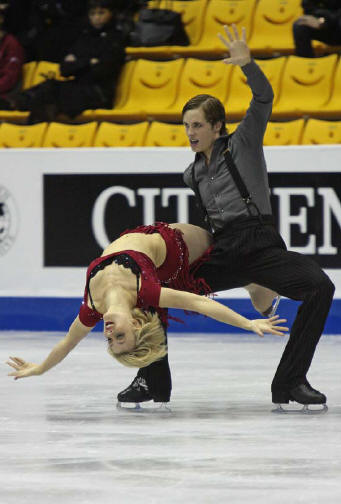
- The Hubbells in 2008

Personal information
- Born: January 15, 1989 (age 37) Lansing, Michigan, U.S.
- Home town: Sylvania, Ohio, U.S.
- Height: 6 ft 0 in (1.83 m)

Figure skating career
- Country: United States
- Discipline: Ice dance
Four Continents Championships
Bronze medal – third place	2010 Jeonju	Ice dance
Junior Grand Prix Final
Gold medal – first place	2006–07 Sofia	Ice dance
Silver medal – second place	2008–09 Goyang	Ice dance

Keiffer J. Hubbell (born January 15, 1989) is an American ice dancer. He competed with his sister Madison Hubbell from 2001 to 2011. They are the 2010 Four Continents bronze medalists, two-time (2009, 2011) U.S. pewter medalists, and 2006 Junior Grand Prix Final champions.

== Personal life ==
Keiffer Hubbell was born in Lansing, Michigan. He graduated from Laurel Springs High School and majored in biology at Owens Community College to study Herpetology. He trained in gymnastics as a child, but quit at age 9 when he began skating.

== Career ==
=== Early career ===
Keiffer Hubbell started skating at age 9. After a brief early partnership with Brittany Blackshaw, he teamed up with his sister, Madison Hubbell, in early 2001. They originally represented the Lansing Skating Club in competition.

In the 2001–2002 season, Madison and Keiffer Hubbell competed for the first time on the Juvenile level, which is the lowest competition level in the U.S. Figure Skating structure. They competed at the Eastern Great Lakes Regional Championships, the qualifying competition for the U.S. Junior Championships. They placed second in the first compulsory dance, and then won the other two compulsory dances and the free dance to win the Juvenile event. This win qualified them for the 2002 U.S. Junior Championships, where they placed 9th in the first compulsory dance, 6th in the second, and 7th in the free dance to place 7th overall.

In the 2002–2003 season, the Hubbells remained on the Juvenile level. At the Eastern Great Lakes Regional Championships, they won all three segments of the competition to win the gold medal. This win qualified them for the 2003 U.S. Junior Championships, where they won the first compulsory dance, placed second in the second compulsory dance, and won the free dance to win the gold medal overall.

The Hubbells moved up to the Intermediate level in the 2003–2004 season and began represented the Ann Arbor Figure Skating Club in competition. At the Eastern Great Lakes Regional Championships, they won all three segments of the competition to win the gold medal. This win qualified them for the 2004 U.S. Junior Championships, where they placed second in the first compulsory dance and then won both the second compulsory dance and the free dance to win the gold medal overall. This was their second consecutive national title.

In the 2004–2005 season, the Hubbells moved up to the Novice level, which is the first level that competes at the U.S. Championships. At the Eastern Great Lakes Regional Championships, the first qualifying competition for the national championships, the Hubbells won all three segments of the competition, winning the competition ahead of training mates Emily Samuelson / Evan Bates. This win qualified them for the Midwestern Sectional Championships, the final qualifying competition for the national championships. At the sectional championships, the Hubbells won both compulsory dances and then placed second in the free skate to win the silver medal behind Samuelson / Bates. This win qualified them to the 2005 U.S. Championships. At the national championships, the Hubbells placed second in the first compulsory dance, then placed sixth in both the second compulsory dance and the free dance segments to place 5th overall. Following the event, the Hubbells were assigned to the Estonia International Dance Competition. At that spring competition, which was their first major international event, the Hubbells won all three segments of the competition and won the gold medal. This medal qualified the Hubbells for the USFSA Reserve team for the following season.

The Hubbells remained on the Novice level for the 2005–2006 season. At the Eastern Great Lakes Regional Championships, they won all three segments of the competition to win the gold medal. This win qualified them for the Midwestern Sectional Championships, where they competed under the ISU Judging System for the first time. They won all three segments of the competition to win the gold medal by a margin of victory of 8.88 points ahead of silver medalists Piper Gilles / Timothy McKernan. This win qualified them for the 2006 U.S. Championships. At the event, the Hubbells tied with fellow sibling team Cathy Reed / Chris Reed in the first compulsory dance with a score of 19.23. The tie was broken by the technical elements mark and so the Hubbells won that segment of the competition. The Hubbells won the second compulsory dance by a margin of 0.29 points ahead of the Reeds. The Hubbells lost the free dance to the Reeds by 1.68 points. The Hubbells placed second overall, winning the silver medal and placed second overall by a margin of 1.39 points behind the Reeds and 6.22 points ahead of bronze medalists Samantha Tomarchio / Nicholas Sinchak.

=== Junior career ===
The Hubbells moved up to the Junior level both nationally and internationally in the 2006–2007 season. They made their ISU Junior Grand Prix debut on the 2006–2007 ISU Junior Grand Prix circuit. At their first event, the event in Courchevel, France, the Hubbells placed second in the compulsory and original dances and then won the free dance. They won the silver medal behind Ekaterina Bobrova / Dmitri Soloviev by a margin of 0.78 points. The Hubbells were then assigned to their second event, the event in The Hague, Netherlands. They placed third in the compulsory dance segment and then won both the original and free dances to win the gold medal overall by a margin of victory of 1.84 points ahead of silver medalists Grethe Grünberg / Kristian Rand. These two placements combined qualified them for the 2006–2007 ISU Junior Grand Prix Final, for which the Hubbells were the third-ranked qualifiers. Qualifying for the Junior Grand Prix Final had also given them a bye to the U.S. Championships.

At the Junior Grand Prix Final, the Hubbells placed second in the Midnight Blues compulsory dance by a margin of 0.17 points behind Bobrova / Soloviev. They won both the original and free dances to win the gold medal overall by a margin of victory of 2.17 points ahead of silver medalists and training mates Emily Samuelson / Evan Bates.

At the 2007 U.S. Championships, the Hubbells placed second in both compulsory dances behind Samuelson / Bates. They won the original dance and went into the free dance in first place overall, where they placed second. They won the silver medal overall, placing second by a margin of 0.17 points behind champions Samuelson / Bates, and 24.56 points ahead of bronze medalists and training-mates Lynn Kriengkrairut / Logan Giulietti-Schmitt. The top three junior dance teams were named to the 2007 Junior Worlds, and all three junior teams were coached Yaroslava Nechaeva and Yuri Chesnichenko.

At the 2007 Junior Worlds, the Hubbells both fell in the Silver Samba compulsory dance and placed 12th in that segment of the competition. They placed 5th in the original dance and 4th in the free dance to move up to place 6th overall.

The Hubbells remained on the Junior level for the 2007–2008 season. Originally scheduled to compete on the 2007–2008 ISU Junior Grand Prix series, the Hubbells withdrew from their events and missed the fall season due to an injury to Keiffer. They began their competitive season at the Midwestern Sectional Championships, where they won all three segments of the competition to qualify for the 2008 U.S. Championships. At the national championships, the Hubbells won the compulsory dance, placed third in the original dance, and then won the free dance to win the gold medal overall. This win qualified them for the 2008 Junior Worlds. At the World Junior Championships, the Hubbells placed 5th in all three segments of the competition and 5th overall.

In the 2008–2009 season, the Hubbells moved up to the senior level nationally and remained juniors internationally. They competed on the 2008–2009 ISU Junior Grand Prix. At their first event in Mexico City, Mexico, they won all three segments of the competition to win the gold medal by a margin of victory of 17.26 points ahead of silver medalists Kharis Ralph / Asher Hill. The Hubbells were then assigned to their second event, the event in Cape Town, South Africa, where they again won all three segments of the competition to win the gold medal by a margin of victory of 9.25 points ahead of silver medalists Piper Gilles / Zachary Donohue. These two placements combined qualified them for the 2008–2009 ISU Junior Grand Prix Final, for which the Hubbells were the top-ranked qualifiers. Qualifying for the Junior Grand Prix Final also gave them a bye to the U.S. Championships.

The Junior Grand Prix Final was being held for the first time concurrently with the Grand Prix Final and so therefore did not include a compulsory dance segment. The Hubbells fell during the original dance and placed 6th in that segment of the competition. They placed second in the free skate and won the silver medal overall, placing 6.47 points behind champions Madison Chock / Greg Zuerlein.

The Hubbells made their senior national debut at the 2009 U.S. Championships. They placed fourth in the compulsory dance, the original dance, and the free dance, to place fourth overall and win the pewter medal. They were named to the team for the 2009 Junior Worlds for the third consecutive year.

At the 2009 World Junior Championships, the Hubbells placed 2nd in the compulsory dance, 3rd in the original dance, and 4th in the free skate to place 4th overall, placing 0.46 points behind bronze medalists Ekaterina Riazanova / Jonathan Guerreiro.

Following the 2009 Trophée Eric Bompard competition, the Hubbells moved from Yaroslava Nechaeva and Yuri Chesnichenko – who coached them in Ann Arbor, Michigan for 10 years – to Pasquale Camerlengo and Anjelika Krylova in Detroit, Michigan.

On May 12, 2011, the Hubbells announced the end of their partnership. In 2012, he teamed up with Anastasia Olson.

== Programs ==
=== With Olson ===
Season	Short dance	Free dance
2012–2013	My Fair Lady by Frederick Loewe	Medley by Michael Jackson

=== With Madison Hubbell ===
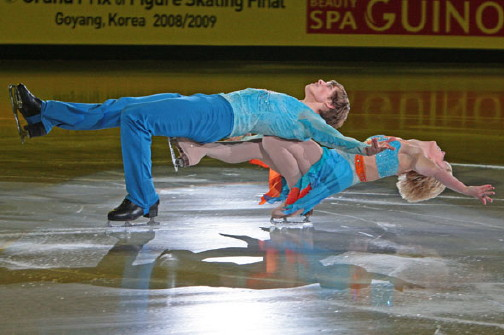
The Hubbells during their Josh Groban exhibition at the 2008-09 Junior Grand Prix Final.

Season	Short dance	Free dance	Exhibition
2010–2011	The Addams Family; Masochism Tango (from The Addams Family)	Ocean Club; Jungle Bill by Yello; Moments in Love by Art of Noise	
	Original dance		
2009–2010	Ukrainian folk dance: Bukovinski Dance; Dibro Vchanka by Suzirya Ensemble	American Woman by The Guess Who; Can't Get You Out of My Mind; Fly Away by Lenny Kravitz	
2008–2009	Minnie the Moocher by Cab Calloway performed by Big Bad Voodoo Daddy	Sognami by Alessandro Safina	Canto Alla Vita by Josh Groban
2007–2008	Folklore from the Alps: Schuhplattler	Hope by Apocalyptica	Hope by Apocalyptica
2006–2007	Tango	Canto Alla Vita by Josh Groban	
2005–2006		Modern Tango	
2004–2005		Canto Alla Vita by Josh Groban	
2003–2004		Espinado by Santana	
2002–2003		Alegria (from Cirque du Soleil)	

== Competitive highlights ==
=== Ice dance with Anastasia Olson ===
Competition placements at senior level
Season	2012–13
Ice Challenge	10th
U.S. Championships	7th

=== Ice dance with Madison Hubbell ===
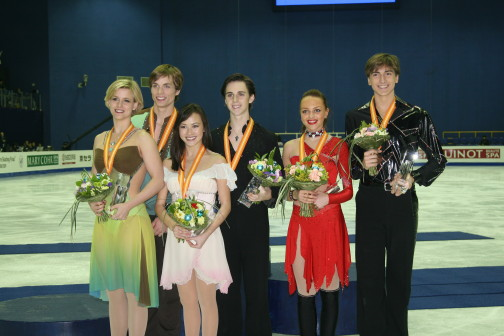
The Hubbells (left) during the medal ceremony at the 2008 JGP Final

- GP – Event of the ISU Grand Prix Series
- JGP – Event of the ISU Junior Grand Prix Series

Competition placements at junior level
Season	2006–07	2007–08	2008–09
World Junior Championships	6th	5th	4th
JGP Final	1st		2nd
JGP France	2nd		
JGP Mexico			1st
JGP Netherlands	1st		
JGP South Africa			1st
U.S. Championships	2nd	1st	

Competition placements at senior level
Season	2008–09	2009–10	2010–11
Four Continents Championships		3rd	
GP Cup of China			6th
GP Skate Canada		6th	
GP Trophée Éric Bompard		8th	
Finlandia Trophy		8th	4th
U.S. Championships	4th	6th	4th
