= Madison Hubbell =

American ice dancer (born 1991)

- Hubbell at the 2014 Four Continents Figure Skating Championships press conference

Personal information
- Born: February 24, 1991 (age 35) Lansing, Michigan, U.S.
- Home town: Sylvania, Ohio, U.S.
- Height: 5 ft 8 in (1.72 m)

Figure skating career
- Country: United States
- Discipline: Ice dance
- Partner: Zachary Donohue (2011–22); Keiffer Hubbell (2001–11)
- Began skating: 1996
- Retired: 2022
- Highest WS: 1st (2018–19)
Event	Gold medal – first place	Silver medal – second place	Bronze medal – third place
Olympic Games	1	0	1
World Championships	0	3	1
Four Continents Championships	1	0	2
Grand Prix Final	1	0	1
U.S. Championships	3	2	4
World Team Trophy	1	0	0
Junior Grand Prix Final	1	1	0
Medal list
Olympic Games
Gold medal – first place	2022 Beijing	Team
Bronze medal – third place	2022 Beijing	Ice dance
World Championships
Silver medal – second place	2018 Milan	Ice dance
Silver medal – second place	2021 Stockholm	Ice dance
Silver medal – second place	2022 Montpellier	Ice dance
Bronze medal – third place	2019 Saitama	Ice dance
Four Continents Championships
Gold medal – first place	2014 Taipei	Ice dance
Bronze medal – third place	2010 Jeonju	Ice dance
Bronze medal – third place	2020 Seoul	Ice dance
Grand Prix Final
Gold medal – first place	2018–19 Vancouver	Ice dance
Bronze medal – third place	2019–20 Turin	Ice dance
U.S. Championships
Gold medal – first place	2018 San Jose	Ice dance
Gold medal – first place	2019 Detroit	Ice dance
Gold medal – first place	2021 Las Vegas	Ice dance
Silver medal – second place	2020 Greensboro	Ice dance
Silver medal – second place	2022 Nashville	Ice dance
Bronze medal – third place	2012 San Jose	Ice dance
Bronze medal – third place	2015 Greensboro	Ice dance
Bronze medal – third place	2016 Saint Paul	Ice dance
Bronze medal – third place	2017 Kansas City	Ice dance
World Team Trophy
Gold medal – first place	2019 Fukuoka	Team
Junior Grand Prix Final
Gold medal – first place	2006–07 Sofia	Ice dance
Silver medal – second place	2008–09 Goyang	Ice dance

Madison Hubbell (born February 24, 1991) is an American former ice dancer. She competed with Zachary Donohue from 2011 to 2022. With him, she is a two-time 2022 Winter Olympics medalist, a four-time World medalist, the 2018 Grand Prix Final champion, the 2014 Four Continents champion, and a three-time U.S. national champion (2018–2019, 2021).

She competed in ice dance with her brother Keiffer Hubbell from 2001 to 2011. With him, she is the 2010 Four Continents bronze medalist, 2006 JGP Final champion, and two-time U.S. national pewter medalist (2009, 2011).

== Personal life ==
Madison Hubbell was born on February 24, 1991, in Lansing, Michigan. She is the daughter of Susan, a seamstress, and Brad Hubbell, a lawyer, and has two older brothers, Keiffer and Zachary.

Hubbell began dating Spanish ice dancer Adrián Díaz in 2014. The couple announced their engagement in April 2018. They got married on June 7, 2023, in Vilanova i la Geltrú, Spain. They have a daughter, Chloe, born in February 2024.

== Early career ==
Madison Hubbell started skating as a five-year-old. She began ice dancing at age eight, skating with her first partner, Nicholas Donahue, for one year. She teamed up with her brother, Keiffer Hubbell, in early 2001. They originally represented the Lansing Skating Club in competition.

Competing on the juvenile level, the Hubbells placed 7th at the 2002 U.S. Junior Championships and won gold at the 2003 U.S. Junior Championships. They began representing the Ann Arbor Figure Skating Club in the 2003–2004 season. They won gold competing on the intermediate level at the 2004 U.S. Junior Championships.

In the 2004–2005 season, the Hubbells moved up to the novice level, which is the first level that competes at the U.S. Championships. At the 2005 U.S. Championships, the Hubbells finished 5th overall. At the Estonia International Dance Competition, which was their first major international event, the Hubbells won all three segments of the competition and won the gold medal. This medal qualified the Hubbells for the USFSA reserve team for the following season.

The Hubbells won the novice silver medal at the 2006 U.S. Championships, scoring 1.39 points less than the champions, Cathy Reed / Chris Reed.

=== 2006–2007 season: Junior debut ===
The Hubbells moved up to the junior level both nationally and internationally. Making their ISU Junior Grand Prix debut in Courchevel, France, the Hubbells placed second in the compulsory and original dances and then won the free dance. They won the silver medal behind Ekaterina Bobrova / Dmitri Soloviev by a margin of 0.78 points. The Hubbells were then assigned to their second event, in The Hague, Netherlands. They placed third in the compulsory dance segment and then won both the original and free dances to win the gold medal overall by a margin of victory of 1.84 points ahead of silver medalists Grethe Grünberg / Kristian Rand. These two placements combined qualified them for the 2006–2007 ISU Junior Grand Prix Final, for which the Hubbells were the third-ranked qualifiers. Qualifying for the event had also given them a bye to the U.S. Championships.

At the Junior Grand Prix Final, the Hubbells placed second in the Midnight Blues compulsory dance by a margin of 0.17 points behind Bobrova/Soloviev. They won both the original and free dances to win the gold medal overall by a margin of victory of 2.17 points ahead of silver medalists and training mates Emily Samuelson / Evan Bates.

At the 2007 U.S. Championships, the Hubbells placed second in both compulsory dances behind Samuelson/Bates. They won the original dance and went into the free dance in first place overall, where they placed second. They won the silver medal overall, placing second by a margin of 0.17 points behind champions Samuelson / Bates, and 24.56 points ahead of bronze medalists and training-mates Lynn Kriengkrairut / Logan Giulietti-Schmitt. The top three junior dance teams were named to the 2007 Junior Worlds, and all three junior teams were coached by Yaroslava Nechaeva and Yuri Chesnichenko.

At the 2007 Junior Worlds, the Hubbells both fell in the Silver Samba compulsory dance and placed twelfth in that segment of the competition. They placed fifth in the original dance and fourth in the free dance to move up to place sixth overall.

=== 2007–2008 season ===
The Hubbells withdrew from their 2007–08 Junior Grand Prix events and missed the fall season due to an injury to Keiffer. They returned to competition at the Midwestern Sectional Championships, winning all three segments to qualify for the 2008 U.S. Championships. At the national championships, the Hubbells won the compulsory dance, placed third in the original dance, and then won the free dance to win the gold medal overall. At the 2008 World Junior Championships, the Hubbells placed fifth in all three segments of the competition and fifth overall.

=== 2008–2009 season: Senior national debut ===
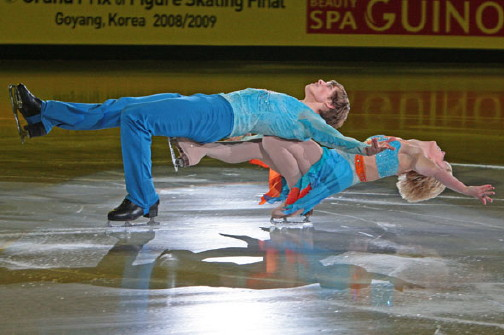
The Hubbells during their Josh Groban exhibition at the 2008–09 Junior Grand Prix Final

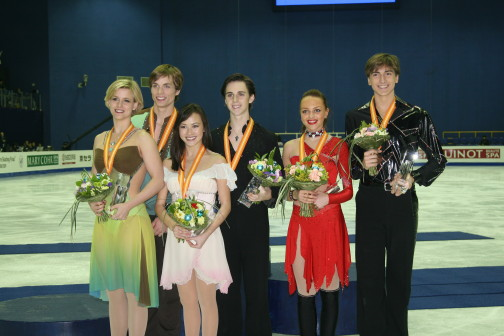
The Hubbells (left) during the medal ceremony at the 2008 JGP Final

The Hubbells moved up to the senior level nationally and remained juniors internationally. They competed on the 2008–09 Junior Grand Prix circuit. At their first event in Mexico City, Mexico, they won all three segments of the competition to win the gold medal by a margin of victory of 17.26 points ahead of silver medalists Kharis Ralph and Asher Hill. The Hubbells were then assigned to their second event, the event in Cape Town, South Africa, where they again won all three segments of the competition to win the gold medal by a margin of victory of 9.25 points ahead of silver medalists Piper Gilles and Zachary Donohue. These two placements combined qualified them for the 2008–09 ISU Junior Grand Prix Final, for which the Hubbells were the top-ranked qualifiers. Qualifying for the Junior Grand Prix Final also gave them a bye to the U.S. Championships.

The Junior Grand Prix Final was held for the first time concurrently with the Grand Prix Final and therefore did not include a compulsory dance segment. The Hubbells fell during the original dance and placed sixth in that segment of the competition. They placed second in the free skate and won the silver medal overall, scoring 6.47 points less than champions Madison Chock and Greg Zuerlein.

The Hubbells made their senior national debut at the 2009 U.S. Championships. They placed fourth in the compulsory dance, the original dance, and the free dance, to place fourth overall and win the pewter medal. At the 2009 World Junior Championships, the Hubbells placed second in the compulsory dance, third in the original dance, and fourth in the free skate to place fourth overall, scoring 0.46 points less than bronze medalists Ekaterina Riazanova and Jonathan Guerreiro.

=== 2009–2010 season: Four Continents bronze ===
Following the 2009 Trophée Éric Bompard competition, the Hubbells moved from Yaroslava Nechaeva and Yuri Chesnichenko, who had coached them in Ann Arbor, Michigan for ten years, to Pasquale Camerlengo and Anjelika Krylova in Detroit. They won the bronze medal at the 2010 Four Continents Championships.

=== 2010–2011 season ===
The Hubbells finished fourth at the 2011 U.S. Championships. On May 12, 2011, they announced the end of their partnership. Keiffer had experienced hip and back problems and was undecided about his future.

== Hubbell and Donohue ==
=== 2011–2012 season ===
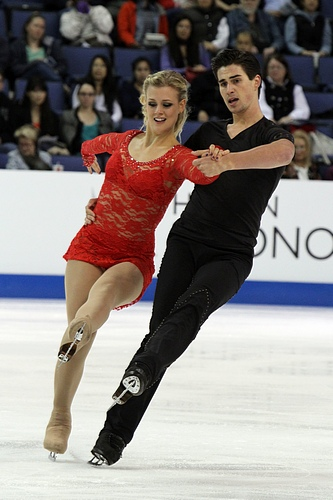
Hubbell and Donohue at the 2011 Skate America

On May 12, 2011, U.S. Figure Skating announced that Hubbell had teamed up with Zachary Donohue. The two decided to train at the Detroit Skating Club under the guidance of the coaching team of Pasquale Camerlengo, Anjelika Krylova, and Natalia Annenko-Deller.

Hubbell and Donohue made their international debut at the 2011 Nebelhorn Trophy, winning the gold medal. After taking bronze at the 2012 U.S. Championships, they were selected to compete at two ISU Championships; they placed fifth at the 2012 Four Continents in Colorado Springs, Colorado, and tenth at the 2012 World Championships in Nice, France.

=== 2012–2013 season ===
Hubbell and Donohue took bronze at the 2012 Finlandia Trophy and competed at two Grand Prix events. They placed fifth at the 2012 Skate Canada International and fourth at the 2012 Trophée Éric Bompard (second in the free dance). After finishing fourth at the 2013 U.S. Championships, they were not selected for any ISU Championships.

=== 2013–2014 season: Four Continents gold ===
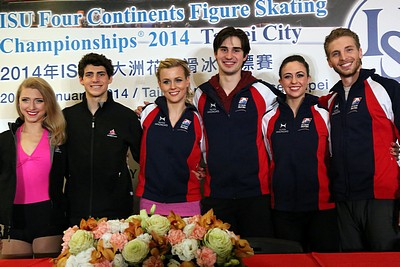
Hubbell and Donohue (center) at the 2014 Four Continents Championships

After sustaining a concussion in June 2013, Hubbell spent six weeks recuperating. She attributed the injury to a "lack of focus, as painful as that is to admit. I finished twizzles, I did my 3-turn, and I fell off my heel."

Hubbell and Donohue won gold at the 2013 Nebelhorn Trophy, placed fourth at the 2013 Skate America, and won their first Grand Prix medal, bronze, at the 2013 Skate Canada International. After placing fourth at the 2014 U.S. Championships, they were assigned to the 2014 Four Continents Championships and finished ahead of Piper Gilles and Paul Poirier to take the gold medal. Hubbell and Donohue were first alternates for the 2014 World Championships but did not take the slot made available when Meryl Davis and Charlie White withdrew; Hubbell had sustained a torn labrum in her left hip and underwent surgery in March 2014.

=== 2014–2015 season ===
Hubbell and Donohue won bronze at both of their Grand Prix events, the 2014 Skate Canada International and 2014 Trophée Éric Bompard, and then took bronze at the 2015 U.S. Championships. They placed 10th at the 2015 World Championships in Shanghai, China.

On April 13, 2015, Hubbell and Donohue announced that they had started training with Marie-France Dubreuil and Patrice Lauzon at the Centre Gadbois in Montreal.

=== 2015–2016 season ===
In November 2015, Hubbell and Donohue won their first Grand Prix title, taking gold at the 2015 Trophée Éric Bompard in Bordeaux as a result of their first place in the short dance, ahead of Canada's Piper Gilles and Paul Poirier. The second day of competition was canceled due to the November 2015 Paris attacks. After winning bronze at the 2015 NHK Trophy, the two qualified to their first Grand Prix Final, where they finished sixth.

Hubbell and Donohue took the bronze medal at the 2016 U.S. Championships. They placed fourth at the 2016 Four Continents Championships in Taipei and sixth at the 2016 World Championships in Boston.

=== 2016–2017 season ===
Ranked third in both segments at the 2017 U.S. Championships, Hubbell and Donohue remained national bronze medalists for a third consecutive year. In February, they placed fourth in the short dance, sixth in the free, and fourth overall at the 2017 Four Continents Championships in Gangneung, South Korea.

In March, Hubbell and Donohue won a small bronze medal for their short dance at the 2017 World Championships in Helsinki, Finland. They dropped to ninth overall after placing tenth in the free dance.

=== 2017–2018 season: World silver ===
Hubbell and Donohue began their season with gold at the 2017 CS U.S. International Classic. After taking bronze at the 2017 Skate Canada International and silver at the 2017 NHK Trophy, they qualified to their third consecutive Grand Prix Final. They finished fourth at the event in Nagoya, Japan.

At the 2018 U.S. Championships, Hubbell and Donohue placed second behind Maia and Alex Shibutani in the short dance and then second to Madison Chock and Evan Bates in the free dance. They won their first national title by a margin of 0.19 over the Shibutanis and 0.52 over Chock/Bates. All of the ice dancing medalists were named to the U.S. Olympic team.

Hubbell and Donohue were not selected for the team event, but competed in the individual ice dancing event. In the short dance, they placed third, behind Tessa Virtue and Scott Moir and Gabriella Papadakis and Guillaume Cizeron, and 0.02 points ahead of the Shibutanis. In the free dance, Donohue put both hands down in the middle of a sliding move, which constituted a technical fall. As a result, they finished fifth in the free dance and fourth overall.

In March, Hubbell and Donohue won silver at the 2018 World Championships in Milan, having placed second in both segments.

=== 2018–2019 season: World bronze ===
Hubbell and Donohue at the 2018 Skate America

Beginning the season again with a win at the U.S. Classic, Hubbell and Donohue were assigned to consecutive Grand Prix events, the 2018 Skate America and 2018 Skate Canada International. They won gold at both events, becoming the first team to qualify for the Grand Prix Final. After victory at Skate Canada International, Hubbell observed, "we wanted to challenge ourselves to become champions in difficult situations, and we knew that it was going to be really challenging to do two Grand Prix back to back at the beginning of the season." At the Grand Prix Final, they placed first in both programs and won the title.

At the 2019 U.S. Championships, facing a returning Chock and Bates, they won their second straight national title. They next competed at the 2019 Four Continents Championships, placing first in the rhythm dance with a new personal best. In the free dance, they unexpectedly dropped to fourth place following multiple errors, including receiving only a base level on their stationary lift after it was deemed non-stationary. As a result, they finished off the podium behind Chock and Bates, Kaitlyn Weaver and Andrew Poje, and Gilles and Poirier. Hubbell commented after, "certainly we would rather it happens here than the Worlds."

Hubbell and Donohue placed fourth in the rhythm dance at the 2019 World Championships, but overtook Alexandra Stepanova and Ivan Bukin in the free dance to place third overall, winning the bronze. Hubbell called it "our strongest performance this season", saying that their "goal was to do our best performance and the rest we can't control, and that was really what we have achieved." They next were part of the gold medal-winning Team USA at the 2019 World Team Trophy, concluding their season.

=== 2019–2020 season: Four Continents bronze ===
Madison Hubbell and Zachary Donohue at the 2019 Skate America

For the musical-themed rhythm dance, Hubbell and Donohue chose to skate a Marilyn Monroe program, a longtime goal of Hubbell's. Hubbell and Donohue were again assigned to the same consecutive events for the Grand Prix. They became two-time Skate America champions with a total of 209.55 points after placing first with a personal best of 84.97 points in the rhythm dance and second in the free dance with a score of 124.58, 0.08 points behind the free dance score of silver medalists Stepanova/Bukin. Donohue was suffering from bronchitis at the time of the event and commented that he hoped to have "two working lungs" by their next competition the following week. At 2019 Skate Canada International the following week, they narrowly led after the rhythm dance, 0.63 points ahead of Gilles/Poirier. They placed second in the free dance, and took the silver medal, in what was considered a significant upset loss.

Qualifying to the Grand Prix Final, Hubbell and Donohue placed second in the rhythm dance. Third in the free dance after having revised nine of the program elements in the interim since Skate Canada International, they won the bronze medal overall.

Entering the 2020 U.S. Championships seeking to win a third consecutive title, they placed second in the rhythm dance, with Donohue slightly losing balance at one point in the Finnstep pattern and their lift being graded at only a level 3. They finished second in the free dance as well, struggling after they came out of their dance spin facing the wrong direction, prompting Hubbell to comment that it was "probably one of the hardest performances, not enjoyable." They won the silver medal behind Chock and Bates.

Returning to the Four Continents Championships after the disappointment of the previous year, Hubbell and Donohue won the rhythm dance again, albeit by a margin of only 0.03 over Chock and Bates, and 2.03 points ahead of Gilles and Poirier in third. In the free dance, both made errors in their twizzle sequence, and they dropped to third place, winning the bronze medal. Hubbell admitted afterward that "our free dance has been a rocky one for us this season." They were assigned to compete at the World Championships in Montreal, but these were canceled as a result of the COVID-19 pandemic.

=== 2020–2021 season: World silver ===
Hubbell and Donohue recruited former training partner and double-Olympic champion Scott Moir as one of their choreographers for the new season, planning to regain momentum lost in the previous year, which they attributed in part to losing confidence in their programs after their loss at Skate Canada. With the ISU assigning the Grand Prix based mainly on training location to minimize international travel, Hubbell and Donohue were nevertheless assigned to the 2020 Skate America in Las Vegas and crossed the border to compete. They won the event for the third consecutive year.

Hubbell and Donohue returned to the United States again for the 2021 U.S. Championships, also held in Las Vegas. They placed second in the rhythm dance, 0.44 points behind Chock and Bates, who had not competed at Skate America due to injury. They won the free dance, skating cleanly, and took their third national title. They were named to the American team for the 2021 World Championships in Stockholm.

The World Championships were held without an audience, and Hubbell and Donohue's training partners and four-time World champions Papadakis and Cizeron declined to attend due to illness and lack of training time, leading to a very contested podium. Hubbell and Donohue placed second in the rhythm dance, two points behind Sinitsina and Katsalapov of Russia and narrowly ahead of Chock and Bates. They were third in the free dance, behind Sinitsina and Katsalapov and Canada's Gilles and Poirier, but remained in second overall by 0.36 points over Gilles and Poirier and won their second silver medal. Their placement combined with Chock and Bates' fourth qualified three berths for American ice dance teams at the 2022 Winter Olympics.

=== 2021–2022 season: Olympic medals and World silver ===
Hubbell and Donohue announced heading into the 2021–22 season that it would be their last before retiring. They won the 2021 U.S. International Classic as their opening assignment, which for that season was not part of the Challenger series.

On the Grand Prix, Hubbell and Donohue began at 2021 Skate America, competing against primary domestic rivals Chock and Bates. They won both segments of the competition to take the gold medal, their fourth consecutive at the event and prevailing over Chock and Bates by 1.31 points. Donohue remarked afterward on his "overwhelming gratitude, being our last Skate America and four consecutive wins for us, it means quite a lot, especially to be able to have a live audience" following the pandemic restrictions in the preceding year and a half. They were initially assigned to the 2021 Cup of China as their second Grand Prix, but following its cancellation, they were reassigned to the 2021 Gran Premio d'Italia. With training partners Papadakis and Cizeron also assigned to the event, Hubbell and Donohue were the presumptive silver medalists, and finished second in both segments of the competition despite a late-program flub on their free dance choreographic lift. Hubbell joked afterward, "we made a mistake at the end, but sometimes you jump in the air, and you hit your partner in the crotch." Their results qualified them to the Grand Prix Final, but it was subsequently canceled due to restrictions prompted by the Omicron variant.

Seeking to defend their title at the 2022 U.S. Championships, Hubbell and Donohue placed second in the rhythm dance due to errors, ending up 2.55 points behind Chock and Bates. They went on to win the free dance but remained in second place overall. Hubbell said, "we wanted to end our career here at the U.S. Championships with a performance that felt present, and we're both very satisfied with how we skated. I think stepping off the ice; we knew we were content with what we put out there." They were subsequently named to the American Olympic team.

Hubbell and Donohue began the 2022 Winter Olympics as the American entries in the rhythm dance segment of the Olympic team event. They scored a new personal best of 86.56 to win the segment, securing ten points for the American team and notably prevailing over reigning World champions Sinitsina and Katsalapov of the ROC. Donohue, pleased with the results, said that "opening up our Olympics this way is really an honor. Originally the U.S won the silver medal, however following a positive doping test of Russia's gold medalist Kamila Valieva, the team members were not awarded their medals, pending an investigation. In January 2024, the Court of Arbitration for Sport disqualified her, and the gold medal was awarded to the U.S. team. This was Hubbell and Donohue's first Olympic medal. In the ice dance event, they finished in third place in the rhythm dance with another new personal best score of 87.13. Third in the free dance, despite a deduction for an extended lift, they won the bronze medal.

Hubbell and Donohue concluded their competitive careers at the 2022 World Championships, held in Montpellier. They finished second in the rhythm dance with a personal best score of 89.72, 3.01 points behind training mates Papadakis and Cizeron. In the free dance they set another personal best (132.67) as well as a personal best for total score (222.39), winning their third World silver medal. With Papadakis and Cizeron taking the gold medal and Chock and Bates the bronze, the entire podium consisted of skaters from the Ice Academy of Montreal. Hubbell said, "we knew that we wanted to skate our best for each other for our last moment, and we found peace in that. We're just very happy."

During the 2024 Paris Olympics, a medal ceremony was held for Hubbell/Donohue and their teammates from the 2022 Olympic Figure Skating Team Event, where they were awarded their Olympic gold medals.

== Coaching and professional career ==
In the summer of 2022, it was announced that she and future husband, Adrián Díaz, would begin coaching and choreographing for ice dancers at the Ice Academy of Montreal campus in London, Ontario alongside Scott Moir.

Her current and former students include:

- (Canada) Charlie Anderson / Cayden Dawson
- (Canada) Nadiia Bashynska / Noé Perron
- (United States) Christina Carreira / Anthony Ponomarenko
- (Italy) Leia Dozzi / Pietro Papetti
- (United States) Isabella Flores / Linus Colmor Jepsen
- (Canada) Lily Hensen / Nathan Lickers
- (United Kingdom) Layla Karnes / Liam Carr
- (Canada) Marie-Jade Lauriault / Romain Le Gac
- (United States) Elliana Peal / Ethan Peal
- (Azerbaijan) Samantha Ritter / Daniel Brykalov
- (Canada) Alyssa Robinson / Jacob Portz
- (Canada) Haley Sales / Nikolas Wamsteeker
- (Belgium) Olivia Josephine Shilling / Leo Baeten
- (Canada) Layla Veillon / Alexander Brandys
- (Japan) Utana Yoshida / Masaya Morita

As a choreographer, her clients have included:

- (Canada) Éliane Foroglou-Gadoury / Luke Anderson
- (Canada) Lia Pereira / Trennt Michaud
- (Canada) Emmanuelle Proft / Nicolas Nadeau
- (Canada) Madeline Schizas

In 2024, Hubbell began advocating for the inclusion of same-sex partnerships in competitive figure skating. Teaming up with close friend and former training mate, Gabriella Papadakis, the pair decided to begin skating together professionally. The duo debuted as a team at 2025 Art on Ice.

== Programs ==
Hubbell and Donohue at the 2018 Skate Canada International exhibition gala

=== With Donohue ===
Season	Short dance	Free dance	Exhibition
2021–2022	Hip Hop: Nasty; Blues: Rope Burn; Hip Hop: Rhythm Nation by Janet Jackson	Drowning by Anne Sila	Once I Was Loved by Melody Gardot
2020–2021	Burlesque: Express; Guy What Takes His Time; Tough Lover performed by Christina Aguilera	Hallelujah performed by Jeff Buckley; Pray Gently to the Night by Karl Hugo; Hallelujah performed by k.d. lang	Jealous by Labrinth
2019–2020	Jive: My Heart Belongs to Daddy by Cole Porter performed by Marilyn Monroe; West Coast Swing: Let's Be Bad (from Smash) performed by Megan Hilty	A Star Is Born: Shallow by Lady Gaga, Mark Ronson, Andrew Wyatt, Anthony Rossomando; Alibi by Bradley Cooper, Lady Gaga, Lukas Nielson	New Girl by Finneas; Oats in the Water by Ben Howard
2018–2019	Tango: Alevare; Tango: Tangata del Alba by Astor Piazzolla	Romeo and Juliet: Introduction to Romeo; Kissing You (instrumental) (from Romeo + Juliet) by Craig Armstrong; Kissing You performed by Des'ree	Hallelujah performed by k.d. lang; Make Me Feel by Janelle Monáe choreo. by Samuel Chouinard
2017–2018	Samba: Le serpent by Guem; Rhumba: Cuando calienta el sol by Talya Ferro; Samba: Sambando (Los Ritmos Calientes)	Across the Sky (instrumental) by Rag'n'Bone Man; Caught Out in the Rain by Beth Hart	Across the Sky (instrumental) by Rag'n'Bone Man; Caught Out in the Rain by Beth Hart; Make Me Feel by Janelle Monáe choreo. by Samuel Chouinard; The Blower's Daughter by Damien Rice; Believer by Imagine Dragons choreo. by Samuel Chouinard
2016–2017	Blues: Feeling Good performed by Nina Simone; Hip Hop: hip hop medley by various artists	"Love" medley: I Wanna Dance with Somebody by Bootstraps; Can't Help Falling in Love by Ingrid Michaelson; Earned It by Bootstraps	Stand by Me covered by Florence + the Machine; Believer by Imagine Dragons choreo. by Samuel Chouinard; Qué has hecho con mi vida by Eva Ruiz; Slip by Elliot Moss
2015–2016	Waltz: Hallelujah performed by k.d. lang; March: Hallelujah March by Karl Hugo	Adagio for Tron (from Tron: Legacy) by Daft Punk	Slip by Elliot Moss; You Can Leave Your Hat On; I Put a Spell on You performed by Joe Cocker
2014–2015	Flamenco: Fiesta flamenca by Monty Kelly; Paso doble: España cañí by Pascual Marquina Narro performed by 101 Strings	The Great Gatsby: Young and Beautiful by Lana Del Rey; Back to Black by Beyoncé and André 3000; A Little Party Never Killed Nobody by Fergie	Down the Road; Happy by C2C; Lay Me Down by Sam Smith
2013–2014	Mr. Pinstripe Suit; Maddest kind of love; Diga Diga Doo by Big Bad Voodoo Daddy	Nocturne Into Bohemian Rhapsody by Lucia Micarelli	Bang Bang by Nico Vega; Hide and Seek by Imogen Heap; Whatcha Say by Jason Derulo
2012–2013	Titanic: by James Horner: Waltz; John Ryan's Polka	Farrucas; Un Amor; Malagueña by Ernesto Lecuona	A Thousand Years by Christina Perri
2011–2012	Latin medley	I Put a Spell on You by Joe Cocker	Make You Feel My Love by Adele

=== With Hubbell ===
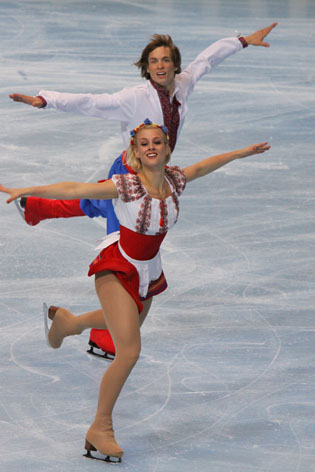
The Hubbells at the 2009 Trophée Éric Bompard

Season	Short dance	Free dance	Exhibition
2010–2011	The Addams Family; Masochism Tango (from The Addams Family)	Ocean Club; Jungle Bill by Yello; Moments in Love by Art of Noise	Smooth Criminal by Michael Jackson
	Original dance		
2009–2010	Ukrainian folk dance: Bukovinski Dance; Dibro Vchanka by Suzirya Ensemble	American Woman by The Guess Who; Can't Get You Out of My Mind; Fly Away by Lenny Kravitz	Imagine by John Lennon
2008–2009	Minnie the Moocher by Cab Calloway performed by Big Bad Voodoo Daddy	Sognami by Alessandro Safina	Canto Alla Vita by Josh Groban
2007–2008	Folklore from the Alps: Schuhplattler	Hope by Apocalyptica	Hope by Apocalyptica
2006–2007	Tango	Canto Alla Vita by Josh Groban	Exodo II by Juan Blas Caballero
2005–2006		Modern Tango	
2004–2005		Canto Alla Vita by Josh Groban	
2003–2004		Espinado by Santana	
2002–2003		Alegría (from Cirque du Soleil)	

== Competitive highlights ==
- GP – Event of the ISU Grand Prix Series
- JGP – Event of the ISU Junior Grand Prix Series
- CS – Event of the ISU Challenger Series
- C – Event was cancelled

=== Ice dance with Zachary Donohue ===
Hubbell and Donohue at the 2018 Skate Canada ice dance podium

Competition placements at senior level
Season	2011–12	2012–13	2013–14	2014–15	2015–16	2016–17	2017–18	2018–19	2019–20	2020–21	2021–22
Winter Olympics							4th				3rd
Winter Olympics (Team event)											1st
World Championships	10th			10th	6th	9th	2nd	3rd	C	2nd	2nd
Four Continents Championships	5th		1st		4th	4th		4th	3rd		
Grand Prix Final					6th	5th	4th	1st	3rd		C
U.S. Championships	3rd	4th	4th	3rd	3rd	3rd	1st	1st	2nd	1st	2nd
World Team Trophy								1st (3rd)			
GP France		4th		3rd	1st	2nd					
GP Italy											2nd
GP NHK Trophy					3rd		2nd				
GP Skate America	6th		4th			2nd		1st	1st	1st	1st
GP Skate Canada		5th	3rd	3rd			3rd	1st	2nd		
CS Finlandia Trophy		3rd				2nd					
CS Golden Spin of Zagreb				1st							
CS U.S. Classic					1st	1st	1st	1st			1st
Nebelhorn Trophy	1st		1st								

=== Ice dance with Keiffer Hubbell ===
Competition placements at junior level
Season	2006–07	2007–08	2008–09
World Junior Championships	6th	5th	4th
Junior Grand Prix Final	1st		2nd
U.S. Championships	2nd	1st	
JGP France	2nd		
JGP Mexico			1st
JGP Netherlands	1st		
JGP South Africa			1st

Competition placements at senior level
Season	2008–09	2009–10	2010–11
Four Continents Championships		3rd	
U.S. Championships	4th	6th	4th
GP Cup of China			6th
GP Rostelecom Cup			WD
GP Skate Canada		6th	
GP Trophée Éric Bompard		8th	
Finlandia Trophy			4th

== Detailed results ==
=== Ice dance with Zachary Donohue ===
ISU personal best scores in the +5/-5 GOE System
Segment	Type	Score	Event
Total	TSS	222.39	2022 World Championships
Rhythm dance	TSS	89.72	2022 World Championships
Rhythm dance	TES	50.95	2022 World Championships
Rhythm dance	PCS	38.77	2022 World Championships
Free dance	TSS	132.67	2022 World Championships
Free dance	TES	74.37	2022 World Championships
Free dance	PCS	58.33	2022 Winter Olympics

ISU personal bests in the +3/-3 GOE System (from 2010–11)
Segment	Type	Score	Event
Total	TSS	196.64	2018 World Championships
Short dance	TSS	80.42	2018 World Championships
Short dance	TES	43.11	2018 World Championships
Short dance	PCS	37.31	2018 World Championships
Free dance	TSS	116.22	2018 World Championships
Free dance	TES	59.68	2018 World Championships
Free dance	PCS	56.54	2018 World Championships

- Small medals for the short program and free skating are only awarded at ISU Championships.
- At national events in the United States, pewter medals are awarded for fourth place.
- Medals at team events are awarded for the team results only. Individual placements at team events are listed in parentheses.

Results in the 2011–12 season
Date	Event	SD		FD		Total	
Date	Event	P	Score	P	Score	P	Score
Sep 21–24, 2011	(Germany) 2011 Nebelhorn Trophy	2	54.82	1	84.19	1	139.01
Oct 21–23, 2011	(United States) 2011 Skate America	6	49.71	3	81.33	6	131.04
Jan 22–29, 2012	(United States) 2012 U.S. Championships	3	57.56	3	94.04	3	151.60
Feb 7–12, 2012	(United States) 2012 Four Continents Championships	5	49.93	5	79.27	5	129.20
Mar 26 – Apr 1, 2012	(France) 2012 World Championships	8	59.56	10	84.39	10	143.95

Results in the 2012–13 season
Date	Event	SD		FD		Total	
Date	Event	P	Score	P	Score	P	Score
Oct 4–7, 2012	(Finland) 2012 Finlandia Trophy	3	58.44	3	91.86	3	150.30
Oct 26–28, 2012	2012 Skate Canada International	4	54.84	6	80.32	5	135.16
Nov 15–18, 2012	(France) 2012 Trophée Éric Bompard	4	56.54	2	88.69	4	145.23
Jan 20–27, 2013	(United States) 2013 U.S. Championships	4	67.75	4	100.11	4	167.86

Results in the 2013–14 season
Date	Event	SD		FD		Total	
Date	Event	P	Score	P	Score	P	Score
Sep 26–28, 2013	(Germany) 2013 Nebelhorn Trophy	2	56.53	1	90.58	1	147.11
Oct 18–20, 2013	(United States) 2013 Skate America	4	60.71	4	92.27	4	152.98
Oct 24–27, 2013	2013 Skate Canada International	3	60.92	3	92.28	3	153.20
Jan 5–12, 2014	(United States) 2014 U.S. Championships	4	66.69	4	101.58	4	168.27
Jan 20–25, 2014	(Taiwan) 2014 Four Continents Championships	2	61.05	1	97.20	1	158.25

Results in the 2014–15 season
Date	Event	SD		FD		Total	
Date	Event	P	Score	P	Score	P	Score
Oct 31 – Nov 2, 2014	2014 Skate Canada International	3	59.29	3	88.94	3	148.23
Nov 21–23, 2014	(France) 2014 Trophée Éric Bompard	3	60.19	3	91.92	3	152.11
Dec 4–6, 2014	(Croatia) 2014 CS Golden Spin of Zagreb	2	66.40	1	100.34	1	166.74
Jan 18–25, 2015	(United States) 2015 U.S. Championships	3	65.43	3	99.31	3	164.74
Mar 23–29, 2015	(China) 2015 World Championships	11	61.43	10	95.13	10	156.56

Results in the 2015–16 season
Date	Event	SD		FD		Total	
Date	Event	P	Score	P	Score	P	Score
Sep 16–20, 2015	(United States) 2015 CS U.S. International Classic	1	61.08	1	92.54	1	153.62
Nov 13–15, 2015	(France) 2015 Trophée Éric Bompard	1	64.45	–	–	1	–
Nov 26–29, 2015	(Japan) 2015 NHK Trophy	2	66.57	3	100.92	3	167.49
Dec 10–13, 2015	(Spain) 2015–16 Grand Prix Final	5	66.21	6	96.99	6	163.20
Jan 15–24, 2016	(United States) 2016 U.S. Championships	3	71.10	3	107.71	3	178.81
Feb 16–21, 2016	(Taiwan) 2016 Four Continents Championships	3	69.36	3	102.93	4	172.29
Mar 28 – Apr 3, 2016	(United States) 2016 World Championships	7	68.44	6	108.37	6	176.81

Note: The 2015 Trophée Éric Bompard was cancelled after the November 2015 Paris attacks. The short programs had been completed on November 13, but the free skating was to be held the next day. On November 23, the International Skating Union announced that the short program results would be considered as the final results for the competition.

Results in the 2016–17 season
Date	Event	SD		FD		Total	
Date	Event	P	Score	P	Score	P	Score
Sep 14–18, 2016	(United States) 2016 CS U.S. International Classic	1	64.82	1	102.08	1	166.90
Oct 6–10, 2016	(Finland) 2016 CS Finlandia Trophy	2	65.31	2	100.45	2	165.76
Oct 21–23, 2016	(United States) 2016 Skate America	3	68.78	2	106.99	2	175.77
Nov 10–13, 2016	2016 Trophée de France	3	66.77	2	107.81	2	174.58
Dec 8–11, 2016	(France) 2016–17 Grand Prix Final	5	72.47	6	107.12	5	179.59
Jan 14–22, 2017	(United States) 2017 U.S. Championships	3	79.72	3	111.70	3	191.42
Feb 15–19, 2017	(South Korea) 2017 Four Continents Championships	4	73.79	6	107.03	4	180.82
Mar 29 – Apr 2, 2017	(Finland) 2017 World Championships	3	76.53	10	101.17	9	177.70

Results in the 2017–18 season
Date	Event	SD		FD		Total	
Date	Event	P	Score	P	Score	P	Score
Sep 13–17, 2017	(United States) 2017 CS U.S. International Classic	1	71.15	1	107.65	1	178.80
Oct 27–29, 2017	2017 Skate Canada International	3	76.08	2	113.35	3	189.43
Nov 10–12, 2017	(Japan) 2017 NHK Trophy	2	76.31	2	112.04	2	188.35
Dec 7–10, 2017	(Japan) 2017–18 Grand Prix Final	4	74.81	4	112.59	4	187.40
Jan 5–7, 2018	(United States) 2018 U.S. Championships	2	79.10	2	118.02	1	197.12
Feb 19–20, 2018	(South Korea) 2018 Winter Olympics	3	77.75	5	109.94	4	187.69
March 21–24, 2018	(Italy) 2018 World Championships	2	80.42	2	116.22	2	196.64

Results in the 2018–19 season
Date	Event	RD		FD		Total	
Date	Event	P	Score	P	Score	P	Score
Sep 12–16, 2018	(United States) 2018 CS U.S. International Classic	1	79.11	1	118.31	1	197.42
Oct 19–21, 2018	(United States) 2018 Skate America	1	78.43	1	122.39	1	200.82
Oct 26–28, 2018	2018 Skate Canada International	1	80.49	2	120.27	1	200.76
Dec 6–9, 2018	(Canada) 2018–19 Grand Prix Final	1	80.53	1	124.82	1	205.35
Jan 19–27, 2019	(United States) 2019 U.S. Championships	1	84.56	1	131.32	1	215.88
Feb 7–10, 2019	(United States) 2019 Four Continents Championships	1	81.95	4	119.71	4	201.66
Mar 18–24, 2019	(Japan) 2019 World Championships	4	83.09	3	127.31	3	210.40
Apr 11–14, 2019	(Japan) 2019 World Team Trophy	3	82.86	3	127.11	1 (3)	–

Results in the 2019–20 season
Date	Event	RD		FD		Total	
Date	Event	P	Score	P	Score	P	Score
Oct 18–20, 2019	(United States) 2019 Skate America	1	84.97	2	124.58	1	209.55
Oct 25–27, 2019	2019 Skate Canada International	1	83.21	2	123.10	2	206.31
Dec 4–8, 2019	(Italy) 2019–20 Grand Prix Final	2	82.72	3	125.21	3	207.93
Jan 20–26, 2020	(United States) 2020 U.S. Championships	2	86.31	2	130.88	2	217.19
Feb 4–9, 2020	(South Korea) 2020 Four Continents Championships	1	85.95	3	122.77	3	208.72

Results in the 2020–21 season
Date	Event	RD		FD		Total	
Date	Event	P	Score	P	Score	P	Score
Oct 23–24, 2020	(United States) 2020 Skate America	1	85.30	1	126.09	1	211.39
Jan 11–21, 2021	(United States) 2021 U.S. Championships	2	89.66	1	134.90	1	224.56
Mar 22–28, 2021	(Sweden) 2021 World Championships	2	86.05	3	128.66	2	214.71

Results in the 2021–22 season
Date	Event	RD		FD		Total	
Date	Event	P	Score	P	Score	P	Score
Sep 15–18, 2021	(United States) 2021 U.S. International Classic	1	84.06	1	123.24	1	207.30
Oct 22–24, 2021	(United States) 2021 Skate America	1	83.58	1	125.96	1	209.54
Nov 5–7, 2021	(Italy) 2021 Gran Premio d'Italia	2	84.79	2	123.11	2	207.90
Jan 3–9, 2022	(United States) 2022 U.S. Championships	2	89.39	1	136.20	2	225.59
Feb 4–7, 2022	(China) 2022 Winter Olympics (Team event)	2	89.39	–	–	1	–
Feb 12–14, 2022	(China) 2022 Winter Olympics	3	87.13	3	130.89	3	218.02
Mar 21–27, 2022	(France) 2022 World Championships	2	89.72	2	132.67	2	222.39
