= 2012–13 figure skating season =

- Date: July 1, 2012 – June 30, 2013
- Previous: 2011–12
- Next: 2013–14

The 2012–13 figure skating season began on July 1, 2012, and ended on June 30, 2013. During this season, elite skaters from men's singles, ladies' singles, pair skating, and ice dance competed on the International Skating Union (ISU) Championship level at the 2013 European, Four Continents, World Junior, and World Championships. They also competed in elite events such as the Grand Prix series and Junior Grand Prix series, culminating in the Grand Prix Final.

== Age eligibility ==
Skaters were eligible to compete in International Skating Union (ISU) events at the junior or senior levels according to their age. These rules may not have applied to non-ISU events such as national championships.

Level	Date of birth
Seniors (eligible for Junior Grand Prix competitions)	Born before July 1, 1999
Seniors (eligible for Grand Prix competitions)	Born before July 1, 1998
Seniors (eligible for senior ISU Championship competitions)	Born before July 1, 1997
Juniors (females in all disciplines; males in singles)	Born before July 1, 1993
Juniors (males in pairs & ice dance)	Born before July 1, 1991

== Changes ==
If skaters of different nationalities formed a team, the ISU required that they choose one country to represent. The date provided is the date when the change occurred or, if not available, the date when the change was announced.

=== Partnership changes ===
Date	Skaters	Disc.	Type	Ref.
August 14, 2012	(United States) Mary Beth Marley / Rockne Brubaker	Pairs	Dissolved	
October 17, 2012	(United States) Kylie Duarte / Colin Grafton	Pairs	Dissolved	
November 9, 2012	(France) Tiffany Zahorski / Alexis Miart	Ice dance	Dissolved	
December 11, 2012	(Czech Republic) Gabriela Kubová / Dmitri Kiselev	Ice dance	Dissolved	
December 11, 2012	(Czech Republic) Gabriela Kubová / Matěj Novák	Ice dance	Formed	
December 18, 2012	(Japan) Narumi Takahashi / Mervin Tran	Pairs	Dissolved	
January 30, 2013	(Japan) Narumi Takahashi / Ryuichi Kihara	Pairs	Formed	
February 7, 2013	(United States) Lindsay Davis / Mark Ladwig	Pairs	Dissolved	
February 19, 2013	(United States) Lindsay Davis / Rockne Brubaker	Pairs	Formed	
March 2013	(Ukraine) Elizaveta Usmantseva / Roman Talan	Pairs	Formed	
March 12, 2013	(United States) Natasha Purich / Mervin Tran	Pairs	Formed	
April 29, 2013	(United States) Becky Bereswill / Joshua Reagan	Pairs	Formed	

=== Retirements ===
Date	Skater(s)	Disc.	Ref.
September 26, 2012	(Canada) Cynthia Phaneuf	Ladies	
November 1, 2012	(Canada) Myriane Samson	Ladies	
January 9, 2013	(Canada) Jessica Dubé / Sébastien Wolfe	Pairs	
April 4, 2013	(United States) Tiffany Vise / Don Baldwin	Pairs	
June 4, 2013	(United States) Armin Mahbanoozadeh	Men	

=== Coaching changes ===
Date	Skater(s)	Disc.	From	To	Ref.
Summer 2012	(Russia) Maxim Kovtun	Men	Nikolai Morozov	Elena Buianova & Tatiana Tarasova	
September 11, 2012	(United States) Adam Rippon	Men	Jason Dungjen & Yuka Sato	Rafael Arutyunyan	
February 21, 2013	(Russia) Vera Bazarova / Yuri Larionov	Pairs	Ludmila Kalinina	Nina Mozer	
February 25, 2013	(United States) Lynn Kriengkrairut / Logan Giulietti-Schmitt	Ice dance	Yaroslava Nechaeva & Yuri Chesnichenko	Igor Shpilband	
April 4, 2013	(Russia) Sergei Voronov	Men	Nikolai Morozov	Eteri Tutberidze	
May 20, 2013	(France) Nathalie Pechalat / Fabian Bourzat	Ice dance	Pasquale Camerlengo & Anjelika Krylova	Igor Shpilband	
June 25, 2013	(United States) Ashley Wagner	Ladies		Rafael Arutyunyan	

== Competitions ==
Code key

- S – Senior event
- J – Junior event
- N – Novice event
- M – Men's singles
- L – Ladies' singles
- P – Pair skating
- D – Ice dance

Color key

- ISU Championships
- Grand Prix or Junior Grand Prix
- National championships
- Other competition

2012
Dates	Event	Type	Level	Disc.	Location	Results
August 8–12	Asian Trophy	Other	All	M/L	Taipei, Taiwan	Details
August 23–25	JGP France	Grand Prix	Junior	M/L/D	Courchevel, France	Details
August 30 – September 1	JGP United States	Grand Prix	Junior	All	Lake Placid, New York, United States	Details
September 8–10	Ice Star	Other	All	All	Minsk, Belarus	Details
September 13–15	JGP Austria	Grand Prix	Junior	All	Linz, Austria	Details
September 13–16	U.S. International Classic	Other	Senior	All	Salt Lake City, Utah, United States	Details
September 22–24	JGP Turkey	Grand Prix	Junior	M/L/D	Istanbul, Turkey	Details
September 27–29	JGP Slovenia	Grand Prix	Junior	M/L/D	Bled, Slovenia	Details
September 27–29	Nebelhorn Trophy	Other	Senior	All	Oberstdorf, Germany	Details
September 29 – October 2	New Zealand Championships	Nationals	All	All	Auckland, New Zealand	Details
October 4–6	Master's de Patinage	Other	S/J	All	Orléans, France	Details
October 4–6	JGP Croatia	Grand Prix	Junior	All	Zagreb, Croatia	Details
October 4–6	Ondrej Nepela Memorial	Other	Senior	All	Bratislava, Slovakia	Details
October 5–7	Finlandia Trophy	Other	Senior	M/L/D	Espoo, Finland	Details
October 5	Medal Winners Open	Other	Senior	M/L	Saitama, Japan	Details
October 6	Japan Open	Other	Senior	M/L	Saitama, Japan	Details
October 11–13	JGP Germany	Grand Prix	Junior	All	Chemnitz, Germany	Details
October 19–21	Skate America	Grand Prix	Senior	All	Kent, Washington, United States	Details
October 24–28	Coupe de Nice	Other	S/J	All	Nice, France	Details
October 25–28	Tirnavia Ice Cup	Other	J/N	M/L	Trnava, Slovakia	Details
October 26–28	Skate Canada International	Grand Prix	Senior	All	Windsor, Ontario, Canada	Details
October 30 – November 4	Crystal Skate of Romania	Other	S/J	M/L/D	Brasov, Romania	Details
November 2–4	Cup of China	Grand Prix	Senior	All	Shanghai, China	Details
November 2–4	NRW Trophy	Other	All	D	Dortmund, Germany	Details
November 6–11	Ice Challenge	Other	All	All	Graz, Austria	Details
November 9–11	Rostelecom Cup	Grand Prix	Senior	All	Moscow, Russia	Details
November 14–18	Skate Celje	Other	J/N	M/L	Celje, Slovenia	Details
November 15–18	Warsaw Cup	Other	All	M/L/P	Warsaw, Poland	Details
November 16–18	Trophée Éric Bompard	Grand Prix	Senior	All	Paris, France	Details
November 17–18	Merano Cup	Other	S/J	M/L	Merano, Italy	Details
November 17–18	Pavel Roman Memorial	Other	All	D	Olomouc, Czech Republic	Details
November 22–24	Grand Prize SNP	Other	J/N	All	Banská Bystrica, Slovakia	Details
November 22–24	Belgian Championships	Nationals	All	All	Deurne, Belgium	Details
November 23–25	NHK Trophy	Grand Prix	Senior	All	Sendai, Japan	Details
November 23–25	Golden Bear of Zagreb	Other	All	M/L/P	Zagreb, Croatia	Details
November 26 – December 2	British Championships	Nationals	All	All	Sheffield, England, United Kingdom	Details
November 28 – December 2	Tallinn Trophy	Other	All	M/L/D	Tallinn, Estonia	Details
December 1–7	Australian Championships	Nationals	All	All	Brisbane, Australia	Details
December 5–9	NRW Trophy	Other	All	M/L/P	Dortmund, Germany	Details
December 5–9	Santa Claus Cup	Other	J/N	M/L/D	Budapest, Hungary	Details
December 6–9	Grand Prix Final	Grand Prix	S/J	All	Sochi, Russia	Details
December 7–9	Danish Championships	Nationals	All	All	Aalborg, Denmark	Details
December 13–15	Swiss Championships	Nationals	Senior	All	Geneva, Switzerland	Details
December 13–16	Golden Spin of Zagreb	Other	Senior	All	Zagreb, Croatia	Details
December 13–16	Denkova-Staviski Cup	Other	All	M/L	Sofia, Bulgaria	Details
December 13–16	French Championships	Nationals	Senior	All	Strasbourg, France	Details
December 13–16	Swedish Championships	Nationals	S/J	M/L/P	Växjö, Sweden	Details
December 14–16	Three Nationals Championships	Nationals	Senior	All	Cieszyn, Poland	Details
December 14–16	Finnish Championships	Nationals	S/J	M/L/D	Joensuu, Finland	Details
December 14–16	Norwegian Championships	Nationals	All	M/L	Stavanger, Norway	Details
December 14–16	Spanish Championships	Nationals	All	All	Majadahonda, Spain	Details
December 15–19	Estonian Championships	Nationals	Senior	M/L/D	Tallinn, Estonia	Details
December 18–21	Ukrainian Championships	Nationals	Senior	All	Kyiv, Ukraine	Details
December 19–22	Austrian Championships	Nationals	S/J	All	Vienna, Austria	Details 1, 2
December 19–22	Italian Championships	Nationals	Senior	All	Milan, Italy	Details
December 20–21	Chinese Championships	Nationals	Senior	All	Harbin, China	Details
December 21–22	German Championships	Nationals	Senior	All	Hamburg, Germany	Details
December 21–22	Hungarian Championships	Nationals	All	All	Budapest, Hungary	Details
December 21–23	Japan Championships	Nationals	Senior	M/L/D	Sapporo, Japan	Details
December 25–28	Russian Championships	Nationals	Senior	All	Sochi, Russia	Details
December 29–30	Latvian Championships	Nationals	All	M/L/P	Riga, Latvia	Details

2013
Dates	Event	Type	Level	Disc.	Location	Results
January 3–6	New Year's Cup	Other	All	All	Bratislava, Slovakia	Details
January 4–6	South Korean Championships	Nationals	All	M/L	Seoul, South Korea	Details 1 2 3
January 10–12	Mentor Nestle Nesquik Cup	Other	All	All	Toruń, Poland	Details
January 10–12	Trophy of Lyon	Other	All	D	Lyon, France	Details
January 10–13	Volvo Open Cup	Other	All	M/L/D	Riga, Latvia	Details
January 13–20	Canadian Championships	Nationals	All	All	Mississauga, Ontario, Canada	Details
January 20–27	U.S. Championships	Nationals	All	All	Omaha, Nebraska, United States	Details
January 23–27	European Championships	Championships	Senior	All	Zagreb, Croatia	Details
January 23–26	Skate Helena	Other	All	M/L	Belgrade, Serbia	Details
January 31 – February 3	Nordic Championships	Other	All	M/L	Reykjavík, Iceland	Details
February 1–3	Russian Junior Championships	Nationals	Junior	All	Saransk, Russia	Details
February 6–11	Bavarian Open	Other	All	All	Oberstdorf, Germany	Details
February 8–10	Dragon Trophy	Other	All	M/L	Ljubljana, Slovenia	Details
February 8–10	Four Continents Championships	Championships	Senior	All	Osaka, Japan	Details
February 13–16	Hellmut Seibt Memorial	Other	All	M/L	Vienna, Austria	Details
February 17–22	European Youth Olympic Festival	Other	Junior	M/L	Brașov, Romania	Details
February 21–24	International Challenge Cup	Other	All	M/L/P	The Hague, Netherlands	Details
February 25 – March 3	World Junior Championships	Championships	Junior	All	Milan, Italy	Details
March 10–17	World Championships	Championships	Senior	All	London, Ontario, Canada	Details
March 22–24	Coupe du Printemps	Other	All	M/L/P	Kockelscheuer, Luxembourg	Details
March 22–24	Mladost Trophy	Other	J/N	M/L/P	Zagreb, Croatia	Details
March 26–30	World Development Trophy	Other	J/N	M/L	Cieszyn, Poland	Details
March 27–31	Triglav Trophy	Other	All	M/L	Jesenice, Slovenia	Details
April 1–3	Gardena Spring Trophy	Other	All	M/L	Sëlva, Italy	Details
April 11–14	World Team Trophy	Other	Senior	All	Tokyo, Japan	Details
April 16–20	World Development Trophy	Other	J/N	M/L/D	Manila, Philippines	
May 12–14	South African Championships	Nationals	All	M/L	Cape Town, South Africa	Details

== International medalists ==
=== Men's singles ===
Championships
Competition	Gold	Silver	Bronze	Results
(Croatia) European Championships	(Spain) Javier Fernández	(France) Florent Amodio	(Czech Republic) Michal Březina	Details
(Japan) Four Continents Championships	(Canada) Kevin Reynolds	(Japan) Yuzuru Hanyu	(China) Yan Han	Details
(Italy) World Junior Championships	(United States) Joshua Farris	(United States) Jason Brown	(United States) Shotaro Omori	Details
(Canada) World Championships	(Canada) Patrick Chan	(Kazakhstan) Denis Ten	(Spain) Javier Fernández	Details

Grand Prix
Competition	Gold	Silver	Bronze	Results
(United States) Skate America	(Japan) Takahiko Kozuka	(Japan) Yuzuru Hanyu	(Japan) Tatsuki Machida	Details
Skate Canada International	(Spain) Javier Fernández	(Canada) Patrick Chan	(Japan) Nobunari Oda	Details
Cup of China	(Japan) Tatsuki Machida	(Japan) Daisuke Takahashi	(Russia) Sergei Voronov	Details
(Russia) Rostelecom Cup	(Canada) Patrick Chan	(Japan) Takahiko Kozuka	(Czech Republic) Michal Březina	Details
(France) Trophée Éric Bompard	(Japan) Takahito Mura	(United States) Jeremy Abbott	(France) Florent Amodio	Details
(Japan) NHK Trophy	(Japan) Yuzuru Hanyu	(Japan) Daisuke Takahashi	(United States) Ross Miner	Details
(Russia) Grand Prix Final	(Japan) Daisuke Takahashi	(Japan) Yuzuru Hanyu	(Canada) Patrick Chan	Details
Junior Grand Prix
Competition	Gold	Silver	Bronze	Reports
JGP France	(China) Jin Boyang	(United States) Jason Brown	(Japan) Ryuju Hino	Details
JGP United States	(United States) Joshua Farris	(Japan) Keiji Tanaka	(Canada) Roman Sadovsky	Details
JGP Austria	(United States) Nathan Chen	(Japan) Ryuju Hino	(South Korea) Kim Jin-seo	Details
JGP Turkey	(United States) Jason Brown	(Russia) Alexander Petrov	(Canada) Nam Nguyen	Details
JGP Slovenia	(United States) Joshua Farris	(China) Jin Boyang	(Russia) Alexander Samarin	Details
JGP Croatia	(Russia) Maxim Kovtun	(China) Yan Han	(United States) Harrison Choate	Details
JGP Germany	(Russia) Maxim Kovtun	(Japan) Shoma Uno	(Russia) Alexander Samarin	Details
JGP Final	(Russia) Maxim Kovtun	(United States) Joshua Farris	(Japan) Ryuju Hino	Details
Other internationals
Competition	Gold	Silver	Bronze	Reports
U.S. Classic	(United States) Max Aaron	(United States) Armin Mahbanoozadeh	(United States) Ross Miner	Details
Nebelhorn Trophy	(Japan) Nobunari Oda	(Russia) Konstantin Menshov	(United States) Keegan Messing	Details
Ondrej Nepela	(Japan) Tatsuki Machida	(Japan) Daisuke Murakami	(Czech Republic) Tomáš Verner	Details
Finlandia Trophy	(Japan) Yuzuru Hanyu	(United States) Richard Dornbush	(Spain) Javier Fernández	Details
Coupe de Nice	(United States) Keegan Messing	(United States) Max Aaron	(Germany) Peter Liebers	Details
Ice Challenge	(Germany) Peter Liebers	(United States) Douglas Razzano	(United States) Armin Mahbanoozadeh	Details
Warsaw Cup	(Sweden) Alexander Majorov	(Uzbekistan) Misha Ge	(Poland) Maciej Cieplucha	Details
Merano Cup	(Italy) Paolo Bacchini	(Czech Republic) Pavel Kaška	(Germany) Christopher Berneck	Details
NRW Trophy	(Russia) Konstantin Menshov	(Czech Republic) Michal Březina	(Germany) Peter Liebers	Details
Golden Spin	(Russia) Vladislav Sezganov	(Russia) Mark Shakhmatov	(Denmark) Justus Strid	Details
Denkova-Staviski	(Uzbekistan) Misha Ge	(Italy) Maurizio Zandron	(Bulgaria) Manol Atanasov	Details
New Year's Cup	(Sweden) Alexander Majorov	(Hong Kong) Ronald Lam	(Philippines) Michael Christian Martinez	Details
Volvo Open Cup	(Kazakhstan) Denis Ten	(Russia) Mikhail Kolyada	(Hong Kong) Ronald Lam	Details
Bavarian Open	(Japan) Nobunari Oda	(Japan) Kento Nakamura	(Germany) Paul Fentz	Details
Challenge Cup	(France) Brian Joubert	(United States) Alexander Johnson	(France) Chafik Besseghier	Details
Triglav Trophy	(Russia) Artur Gachinski	(Kazakhstan) Abzal Rakimgaliev	(Japan) Daisuke Murakami	Details
Gardena Spring	(Japan) Takahiko Kozuka	(United States) Adam Rippon	(Switzerland) Stéphane Walker	Details

=== Ladies ===
Championships
Competition	Gold	Silver	Bronze	Reports
(Croatia) European Championships	(Italy) Carolina Kostner	(Russia) Adelina Sotnikova	(Russia) Elizaveta Tuktamysheva	Details
(Japan) Four Continents Championships	(Japan) Mao Asada	(Japan) Akiko Suzuki	(Japan) Kanako Murakami	Details
(Italy) World Junior Championships	(Russia) Elena Radionova	(Russia) Yulia Lipnitskaya	(Russia) Anna Pogorilaya	Details
(Canada) World Championships	(South Korea) Kim Yuna	(Italy) Carolina Kostner	(Japan) Mao Asada	Details
Grand Prix
Competition	Gold	Silver	Bronze	Reports
(United States) Skate America	(United States) Ashley Wagner	(United States) Christina Gao	(Russia) Adelina Sotnikova	Details
Skate Canada International	(Canada) Kaetlyn Osmond	(Japan) Akiko Suzuki	(Japan) Kanako Murakami	Details
Cup of China	(Japan) Mao Asada	(Russia) Yulia Lipnitskaya	(Finland) Kiira Korpi	Details
(Russia) Rostelecom Cup	(Finland) Kiira Korpi	(United States) Gracie Gold	(United States) Agnes Zawadzki	Details
(France) Trophée Éric Bompard	(United States) Ashley Wagner	(Russia) Elizaveta Tuktamysheva	(Russia) Yulia Lipnitskaya	Details
(Japan) NHK Trophy	(Japan) Mao Asada	(Japan) Akiko Suzuki	(United States) Mirai Nagasu	Details
(Russia) Grand Prix Final	(Japan) Mao Asada	(United States) Ashley Wagner	(Japan) Akiko Suzuki	Details
Junior Grand Prix
Competition	Gold	Silver	Bronze	Reports
JGP France	(Russia) Elena Radionova	(Japan) Rika Hongo	(Russia) Uliana Titushkina	Details
JGP United States	(Japan) Satoko Miyahara	(United States) Courtney Hicks	(United States) Angela Wang	Details
JGP Austria	(Russia) Elena Radionova	(United States) Hannah Miller	(United States) Samantha Cesario	Details
JGP Turkey	(United States) Leah Keiser	(South Korea) Park So-youn	(Japan) Satoko Miyahara	Details
JGP Slovenia	(South Korea) Kim Hae-jin	(United States) Barbie Long	(Russia) Evgenia Gerasimova	Details
JGP Croatia	(United States) Angela Wang	(United States) Hannah Miller	(Russia) Anna Pogorilaya	Details
JGP Germany	(Russia) Anna Pogorilaya	(Japan) Miyabi Oba	(Russia) Maria Stavitskaia	Details
JGP Final	(Russia) Elena Radionova	(United States) Hannah Miller	(Russia) Anna Pogorilaya	Details
Other internationals
Competition	Gold	Silver	Bronze	Reports
U.S. Classic	(United States) Agnes Zawadzki	(United States) Gracie Gold	(Canada) Amelie Lacoste	Details
Nebelhorn Trophy	(Canada) Kaetlyn Osmond	(Russia) Adelina Sotnikova	(Japan) Haruka Imai	Details
Ondrej Nepela	(United Kingdom) Jenna McCorkell	(Slovakia) Monika Simančíková	(Czech Republic) Eliška Březinová	Details
Finlandia Trophy	(Russia) Yulia Lipnitskaya	(Finland) Kiira Korpi	(United States) Mirai Nagasu	Details
Coupe de Nice	(Russia) Polina Korobeynikova	(Sweden) Isabelle Olsson	(Russia) Kristina Zaseeva	Details
Ice Challenge	(United Kingdom) Jenna McCorkell	(Sweden) Isabelle Olsson	(Slovakia) Monika Simančíková	Details
Warsaw Cup	(Sweden) Isabelle Olsson	(Ukraine) Natalia Popova	(Germany) Sandy Hoffmann	Details
Merano Cup	(Germany) Sarah Hecken	(Slovakia) Nicole Rajicova	(Australia) Brooklee Han	Details
NRW Trophy	(South Korea) Kim Yuna	(Russia) Ksenia Makarova	(Sweden) Viktoria Helgesson	Details
Golden Spin	(Italy) Carolina Kostner	(Russia) Kristina Zaseeva	(Brazil) Isadora Williams	Details
Denkova-Staviski	(Italy) Valentina Marchei	(Italy) Francesca Rio	(Italy) Roberta Rodeghiero	Details
New Year's Cup	(Germany) Sarah Hecken	(Austria) Kerstin Frank	(Slovakia) Monika Simančíková	Details
Volvo Open Cup	(China) Li Zijun	(China) Zhao Ziquan	(Slovenia) Daša Grm	Details
Bavarian Open	(Germany) Nathalie Weinzierl	(Germany) Sarah Hecken	(Slovakia) Nicole Rajicova	Details
Challenge Cup	(Italy) Carolina Kostner	(France) Maé Bérénice Méité	(Austria) Kerstin Frank	Details
Triglav Trophy	(Russia) Nikol Gosviani	(Japan) Miyabi Oba	(Russia) Polina Agafonova	Details
Gardena Spring	(Italy) Valentina Marchei	(Japan) Haruka Imai	(Italy) Giada Russo	Details

=== Pairs ===
Championships
Competition	Gold	Silver	Bronze	Reports
(Croatia) European Championships	(Russia) Tatiana Volosozhar / Maxim Trankov	(Germany) Aliona Savchenko / Robin Szolkowy	(Italy) Stefania Berton / Ondřej Hotárek	Details
(Japan) Four Continents Championships	(Canada) Meagan Duhamel / Eric Radford	(Canada) Kirsten Moore-Towers / Dylan Moscovitch	(United States) Marissa Castelli / Simon Shnapir	Details
(Italy) World Junior Championships	(United States) Haven Denney / Brandon Frazier	(Canada) Margaret Purdy / Michael Marinaro	(Russia) Lina Fedorova / Maxim Miroshkin	Details
(Canada) World Championships	(Russia) Tatiana Volosozhar / Maxim Trankov	(Germany) Aliona Savchenko / Robin Szolkowy	(Canada) Meagan Duhamel / Eric Radford	Details
Grand Prix
Competition	Gold	Silver	Bronze	Reports
(United States) Skate America	(Russia) Tatiana Volosozhar / Maxim Trankov	(China) Pang Qing / Tong Jian	(United States) Caydee Denney / John Coughlin	Details
Skate Canada International	(Germany) Aliona Savchenko / Robin Szolkowy	(Canada) Meagan Duhamel / Eric Radford	(Italy) Stefania Berton / Ondřej Hotárek	Details
Cup of China	(China) Pang Qing / Tong Jian	(Russia) Yuko Kavaguti / Alexander Smirnov	(Russia) Ksenia Stolbova / Fedor Klimov	Details
(Russia) Rostelecom Cup	(Russia) Tatiana Volosozhar / Maxim Trankov	(Russia) Vera Bazarova / Yuri Larionov	(United States) Caydee Denney / John Coughlin	Details
(France) Trophée Éric Bompard	(Russia) Yuko Kavaguti / Alexander Smirnov	(Canada) Meagan Duhamel / Eric Radford	(Italy) Stefania Berton / Ondřej Hotárek	Details
(Japan) NHK Trophy	(Russia) Vera Bazarova / Yuri Larionov	(Canada) Kirsten Moore-Towers / Dylan Moscovitch	(United States) Marissa Castelli / Simon Shnapir	Details
(Russia) Grand Prix Final	(Russia) Tatiana Volosozhar / Maxim Trankov	(Russia) Vera Bazarova / Yuri Larionov	(China) Pang Qing / Tong Jian	Details
Junior Grand Prix
Competition	Gold	Silver	Bronze	Reports
JGP United States	(Canada) Margaret Purdy / Michael Marinaro	(Russia) Vasilisa Davankova / Andrei Deputat	(United States) Madeline Aaron / Max Settlage	Details
JGP Austria	(Canada) Brittany Jones / Ian Beharry	(Russia) Lina Fedorova / Maxim Miroshkin	(Russia) Maria Vigalova / Egor Zakroev	Details
JGP Croatia	(Canada) Margaret Purdy / Michael Marinaro	(China) Yu Xiaoyu / Jin Yang	(Russia) Vasilisa Davankova / Andrei Deputat	Details
JGP Germany	(Russia) Lina Fedorova / Maxim Miroshkin	(Russia) Maria Vigalova / Egor Zakroev	(Canada) Brittany Jones / Ian Beharry	Details
JGP Final	(Russia) Lina Fedorova / Maxim Miroshkin	(Russia) Vasilisa Davankova / Andrei Deputat	(Russia) Maria Vigalova / Egor Zakroev	Details
Other internationals
Competition	Gold	Silver	Bronze	Reports
U.S. Classic	(Canada) Kirsten Moore-Towers / Dylan Moscovitch	(Canada) Paige Lawrence / Rudi Swiegers	(United States) Tiffany Vise / Don Baldwin	Details
Nebelhorn Trophy	(Russia) Tatiana Volosozhar / Maxim Trankov	(United States) Caydee Denney / John Coughlin	(France) Vanessa James / Morgan Ciprès	Details
Ondrej Nepela	(Russia) Anastasia Martiusheva / Alexei Rogonov	(Italy) Stefania Berton / Ondřej Hotárek	(Italy) Nicole Della Monica / Matteo Guarise	Details
Coupe de Nice	(United States) Alexa Scimeca / Chris Knierim	(Russia) Ksenia Stolbova / Fedor Klimov	(Italy) Nicole Della Monica / Matteo Guarise	Details
Ice Challenge	(United States) Marissa Castelli / Simon Shnapir	(United States) Gretchen Donlan / Andrew Speroff	(Israel) Danielle Montalbano / Evgeni Krasnopolski	Details
Warsaw Cup	(Russia) Evgenia Tarasova / Vladimir Morozov	(Belarus) Maria Paliakova / Nikita Bochkov	(Ukraine) Alexandra Gorovaya / Sergei Deynega	Details
NRW Trophy	(Germany) Aliona Savchenko / Robin Szolkowy	(Italy) Stefania Berton / Ondřej Hotárek	(France) Vanessa James / Morgan Ciprès	Details
Golden Spin	(Azerbaijan) Angelina Ekaterinina / Philipp Tarasov	(Austria) Stina Martini / Severin Kiefer	(Bulgaria) Elizaveta Makarova / Leri Kenchadze	Details
Nestle Cup	(Bulgaria) Elizaveta Makarova / Leri Kenchadze	(Belarus) Maria Paliakova / Nikita Bochkov	(Poland) Marcelina Lech / Jakub Tyc	Details
Bavarian Open	(Russia) Ksenia Stolbova / Fedor Klimov	(Russia) Julia Antipova / Nodari Maisuradze	(Germany) Mari Vartmann / Aaron Van Cleave	Details
Challenge Cup	(France) Vanessa James / Morgan Ciprès	(United States) Tarah Kayne / Daniel O'Shea	(Germany) Mari Vartmann / Aaron Van Cleave	Details

=== Ice dance ===
Championships
Competition	Gold	Silver	Bronze	Reports
(Croatia) European Championships	(Russia) Ekaterina Bobrova / Dmitri Soloviev	(Russia) Elena Ilinykh / Nikita Katsalapov	(Italy) Anna Cappellini / Luca Lanotte	Details
(Japan) Four Continents Championships	(United States) Meryl Davis / Charlie White	(Canada) Tessa Virtue / Scott Moir	(United States) Madison Chock / Evan Bates	Details
(Italy) World Junior Championships	(Russia) Alexandra Stepanova / Ivan Bukin	(France) Gabriella Papadakis / Guillaume Cizeron	(United States) Alexandra Aldridge / Daniel Eaton	Details
(Canada) World Championships	(United States) Meryl Davis / Charlie White	(Canada) Tessa Virtue / Scott Moir	(Russia) Ekaterina Bobrova / Dmitri Soloviev	Details
Grand Prix
Competition	Gold	Silver	Bronze	Reports
(United States) Skate America	(United States) Meryl Davis / Charlie White	(Russia) Ekaterina Bobrova / Dmitri Soloviev	(Canada) Kaitlyn Weaver / Andrew Poje	Details
Skate Canada International	(Canada) Tessa Virtue / Scott Moir	(Italy) Anna Cappellini / Luca Lanotte	(Russia) Ekaterina Riazanova / Ilia Tkachenko	Details
Cup of China	(France) Nathalie Péchalat / Fabian Bourzat	(Russia) Ekaterina Bobrova / Dmitri Soloviev	(Canada) Kaitlyn Weaver / Andrew Poje	Details
(Russia) Rostelecom Cup	(Canada) Tessa Virtue / Scott Moir	(Russia) Elena Ilinykh / Nikita Katsalapov	(Russia) Victoria Sinitsina / Ruslan Zhiganshin	Details
(France) Trophée Éric Bompard	(France) Nathalie Péchalat / Fabian Bourzat	(Italy) Anna Cappelini / Luca Lanotte	(Russia) Ekaterina Riazanova / Ilia Tkachenko	Details
(Japan) NHK Trophy	(United States) Meryl Davis / Charlie White	(Russia) Elena Ilinykh / Nikita Katsalapov	(United States) Maia Shibutani / Alex Shibutani	Details
(Russia) Grand Prix Final	(United States) Meryl Davis / Charlie White	(Canada) Tessa Virtue / Scott Moir	(France) Nathalie Péchalat / Fabian Bourzat	Details
Junior Grand Prix
Competition	Gold	Silver	Bronze	Reports
JGP France	(France) Gabriella Papadakis / Guillaume Cizeron	(Russia) Valeria Zenkova / Valerie Sinitsin	(Canada) Madeline Edwards / Zhao Kai Pang	Details
JGP United States	(United States) Alexandra Aldridge / Daniel Eaton	(Russia) Evgenia Kosigina / Nikolai Moroshkin	(Canada) Andréanne Poulin / Marc-André Servant	Details
JGP Austria	(France) Gabriella Papadakis / Guillaume Cizeron	(Russia) Anna Yanovskaia / Sergey Mozgov	(Canada) Mackenzie Bent / Garrett MacKeen	Details
JGP Turkey	(Russia) Alexandra Stepanova / Ivan Bukin	(Germany) Shari Koch / Christian Nüchtern	(Canada) Madeline Edwards / Zhao Kai Pang	Details
JGP Slovenia	(United States) Alexandra Aldridge / Daniel Eaton	(Russia) Anna Yanovskaia / Sergey Mozgov	(Canada) Andréanne Poulin / Marc-André Servant	Details
JGP Croatia	(Russia) Valeria Zenkova / Valerie Sinitsin	(Russia) Evgenia Kosigina / Nikolai Moroshkin	(United States) Rachel Parsons / Michael Parsons	Details
JGP Germany	(Russia) Alexandra Stepanova / Ivan Bukin	(United States) Kaitlin Hawayek / Jean-Luc Baker	(Russia) Daria Morozova / Mikhail Zhirnov	Details
JGP Final	(Russia) Alexandra Stepanova / Ivan Bukin	(France) Gabriella Papadakis / Guillaume Cizeron	(United States) Alexandra Aldridge / Daniel Eaton	Details
Other internationals
Competition	Gold	Silver	Bronze	Reports
U.S. Classic	(Canada) Piper Gilles / Paul Poirier	(Canada) Alexandra Paul / Mitchell Islam	(United States) Lynn Kriengkrairut / Logan Giulietti-Schmitt	Details
Nebelhorn Trophy	(United States) Madison Chock / Evan Bates	(Azerbaijan) Julia Zlobina / Alexei Sitnikov	(Germany) Nelli Zhiganshina / Alexander Gazsi	Details
Ondrej Nepela	(Canada) Kaitlyn Weaver / Andrew Poje	(Italy) Lorenza Alessandrini / Simone Vaturi	(United Kingdom) Charlotte Aiken / Josh Whidborne	Details
Finlandia Trophy	(Russia) Ekaterina Bobrova / Dmitri Soloviev	(Italy) Anna Cappellini / Luca Lanotte	(United States) Madison Hubbell / Zachary Donohue	Details
Coupe de Nice	(Russia) Ksenia Monko / Kirill Khaliavin	(Russia) Valeria Starygina / Ivan Volobuiev	(Estonia) Irina Shtork / Taavi Rand	Details
NRW Trophy	(France) Pernelle Carron / Lloyd Jones	(Japan) Cathy Reed / Chris Reed	(Russia) Valeria Starygina / Ivan Volobuiev	Details
Ice Challenge	(United States) Lynn Kriengkrairut / Logan Giulietti-Schmitt	(Czech Republic) Lucie Myslivečková / Neil Brown	(Switzerland) Ramona Elsener / Florian Roost	Details
Pavel Roman	(Germany) Nelli Zhiganshina / Alexander Gazsi	(Ukraine) Siobhan Heekin-Canedy / Dmitri Dun	(Italy) Charlène Guignard / Marco Fabbri	Details (pdf)
Golden Spin	(Russia) Ekaterina Riazanova / Ilia Tkachenko	(Azerbaijan) Julia Zlobina / Alexei Sitnikov	(Ukraine) Siobhan Heekin-Canedy / Dmitri Dun	Details
New Year's Cup	(Italy) Charlène Guignard / Marco Fabbri	(Slovakia) Federica Testa / Lukas Csolley	(Germany) Tanja Kolbe / Stefano Caruso	Details
Nestle Cup	(Ukraine) Siobhan Heekin-Canedy / Dmitri Dun	(Japan) Cathy Reed / Chris Reed	(Australia) Danielle O'Brien / Gregory Merriman	Details
Volvo Open Cup	(Russia) Victoria Sinitsina / Ruslan Zhiganshin	(Estonia) Irina Shtork / Taavi Rand	(Germany) Tanja Kolbe / Stefano Caruso	Details
Trophy of Lyon	(Italy) Charlène Guignard / Marco Fabbri	(Spain) Sara Hurtado / Adrià Díaz	(Czech Republic) Lucie Myslivečková / Neil Brown	Details
Bavarian Open	(United Kingdom) Penny Coomes / Nicholas Buckland	(Lithuania) Isabella Tobias / Deividas Stagniūnas	(Italy) Lorenza Alessandrini / Simone Vaturi	Details

== Season's best scores ==
=== Men's singles ===
Top 10 season's best scores in the men's combined total
No.	Skater	Nation	Score	Event
1	Javier Fernández	Spain	274.87	2013 European Championships
2	Daisuke Takahashi	Japan	269.40	2012–13 Grand Prix Final
3	Patrick Chan	Canada	267.78	2013 World Championships
4	Denis Ten	Kazakhstan	266.48	2013 World Championships
5	Yuzuru Hanyu	Japan	264.29	2012–13 Grand Prix Final
6	Takahiko Kozuka	Japan	253.27	2012–13 Grand Prix Final
7	Kevin Reynolds	Canada	250.55	2013 Four Continents Championships
8	Florent Amodio	France	250.53	2013 European Championships
9	Michal Březina	Czech Republic	243.52	2013 European Championships
10	Max Aaron	United States	238.36	2013 World Championships

=== Ladies' singles ===
Top 10 season's best scores in the ladies' combined total
No.	Skater	Nation	Score	Event
1	Kim Yuna	South Korea	218.31	2013 World Championships
2	Mao Asada	Japan	205.45	2013 Four Continents Championships
3	Akiko Suzuki	Japan	199.58	2013 World Team Trophy
4	Carolina Kostner	Italy	197.89	2013 World Championships
5	Adelina Sotnikova	Russia	193.99	2013 European Championships
6	Ashley Wagner	United States	190.63	2012 Trophée Éric Bompard
7	Kanako Murakami	Japan	189.73	2013 World Championships
8	Elizaveta Tuktamysheva	Russia	188.85	2013 European Championships
9	Gracie Gold	United States	188.03	2013 World Team Trophy
10	Li Zijun	China	183.85	2013 World Championships

=== Pairs ===
Top 10 season's best scores in the pairs' combined total
No.	Team	Nation	Score	Event
1	Tatiana Volosozhar / Maxim Trankov	Russia	225.71	2013 World Championships
2	Aliona Savchenko / Robin Szolkowy	Germany	205.56	2013 World Championships
3	Meagan Duhamel / Eric Radford	Canada	204.56	2013 World Championships
4	Vera Bazarova / Yuri Larionov	Russia	201.60	2012–13 Grand Prix Final
5	Kirsten Moore-Towers / Dylan Moscovitch	Canada	199.50	2013 World Championships
6	Pang Qing / Tong Jian	China	194.64	2013 World Championships
7	Yuko Kavaguti / Alexander Smirnov	Russia	191.59	2013 World Championships
8	Stefania Berton / Ondřej Hotárek	Italy	187.45	2013 European Championships
9	Vanessa James / Morgan Ciprès	France	180.17	2013 World Championships
10	Caydee Denney / John Coughlin	United States	179.21	2012 Rostelecom Cup

=== Ice dance ===
Top 10 season's best scores in the combined total (ice dance)
No.	Team	Nation	Score	Event
1	Meryl Davis / Charlie White	United States	189.56	2013 World Championships
2	Tessa Virtue / Scott Moir	Canada	185.04	2013 World Championships
3	Nathalie Péchalat / Fabian Bourzat	France	170.18	2012–13 Grand Prix Final
4	Ekaterina Bobrova / Dmitri Soloviev	Russia	169.25	2013 European Championships
5	Elena Ilinykh / Nikita Katsalapov	Russia	169.14	2013 European Championships
6	Anna Cappellini / Luca Lanotte	Italy	168.04	2013 World Championships
7	Kaitlyn Weaver / Andrew Poje	Canada	166.20	2013 World Championships
8	Madison Chock / Evan Bates	United States	164.91	2013 World Team Trophy
9	Maia Shibutani / Alex Shibutani	United States	159.97	2013 Four Continents Championships
10	Piper Gilles / Paul Poirier	Canada	157.83	2013 Four Continents Championships

== World standings ==
=== Men's singles ===
As of April 20, 2013

No.	Skater	Nation
1	Patrick Chan	Canada
2	Yuzuru Hanyu	Japan
3	Daisuke Takahashi	Japan
4	Javier Fernandez	Spain
5	Michal Brezina	Czech Republic
6	Denis Ten	Kazakhstan
7	Takahiko Kozuka	Japan
8	Artur Gachinski	Russia
9	Jeremy Abbott	United States
10	Florent Amodio	France

=== Ladies' singles ===
As of 20 April 2013

No.	Skater	Nation
1	Carolina Kostner	Italy
2	Akiko Suzuki	Japan
3	Mao Asada	Japan
4	Alena Leonova	Russia
5	Ashley Wagner	United States
6	Kiira Korpi	Finland
7	Kanako Murakami	Japan
8	Viktoria Helgesson	Sweden
9	Adelina Sotnikova	Russia
10	Elizaveta Tuktamysheva	Russia

=== Pairs ===
As of 20 April 2013

No.	Team	Nation
1	Tatiana Volosozhar / Maxim Trankov	Russia
2	Aliona Savchenko / Robin Szolkowy	Germany
3	Meagan Duhamel / Eric Radford	Canada
4	Vera Bazarova / Yuri Larionov	Russia
5	Pang Qing / Tong Jian	China
6	Stefania Berton / Ondrej Hotarek	Italy
7	Yuko Kavaguti / Alexander Smirnov	Russia
8	Kirsten Moore-Towers / Dylan Moscovitch	Canada
9	Ksenia Stolbova / Fedor Klimov	Russia
10	Sui Wenjing / Han Cong	China

=== Ice dance ===
As of 20 April 2013

No.	Team	Nation
1	Meryl Davis / Charlie White	United States
2	Tessa Virtue / Scott Moir	Canada
3	Nathalie Péchalat / Fabian Bourzat	France
4	Ekaterina Bobrova / Dmitri Soloviev	Russia
5	Anna Cappellini / Luca Lanotte	Italy
6	Kaitlyn Weaver / Andrew Poje	Canada
7	Elena Ilinykh / Nikita Katsalapov	Russia
8	Maia Shibutani / Alex Shibutani	United States
9	Nelli Zhiganshina / Alexander Gazsi	Germany
10	Penny Coomes / Nicholas Buckland	Great Britain

== Current season's world rankings ==
=== Men's singles ===
As of 20 April 2013

No.	Skater	Nation
1	Patrick Chan	Canada
2	Yuzuru Hanyu	Japan
3	Javier Fernandez	Spain
4	Daisuke Takahashi	Japan
5	Michal Brezina	Czech Republic
6	Denis Ten	Kazakhstan
7	Kevin Reynolds	Canada
8	Florent Amodio	France
9	Tatsuki Machida	Japan
10	Richard Dornbush	United States

==== Ladies' singles ====
As of 20 April 2013

Rank	Skater	Nation			
Rank	Skater	Nation	1	Mao Asada	JPN
2	Ashley Wagner	USA			
3	Akiko Suzuki	JPN			
4	Carolina Kostner	ITA			
5	Adelina Sotnikova	RUS			
6	Elizaveta Tuktamysheva	RUS			
7	Gracie Gold	USA			
8	Kanako Murakami	JPN			
9	Yuna Kim	KOR			
10	Christina Gao	USA			

==== Pairs ====
As of 20 April 2013

Rank	Team	Nation			
Rank	Team	Nation	1	Tatiana Volosozhar / Maxim Trankov	RUS
2	Kirsten Moore-Towers / Dylan Moscovitch	CAN			
3	Meagan Duhamel / Eric Radford	CAN			
4	Qing Pang / Jian Tong	CHN			
5	Vera Bazarova / Yuri Larionov	RUS			
6	Aliona Savchenko / Robin Szolkowy	GER			
7	Vanessa James / Morgan Cipres	FRA			
8	Yuko Kavaguti / Alexander Smirnov	RUS			
9	Ksenia Stolbova / Fedor Klimov	RUS			
10	Stefania Berton / Ondrej Hotarek	ITA			

==== Ice dance ====
As of 20 April 2013

Rank	Team	Nation			
Rank	Team	Nation	1	Meryl Davis / Charlie White	USA
2	Tessa Virtue / Scott Moir	CAN			
3	Ekaterina Bobrova / Dmitri Soloviev	RUS			
4	Anna Cappellini / Luca Lanotte	ITA			
5	Elena Ilinykh / Nikita Katsalapov	RUS			
6	Nathalie Péchalat / Fabian Bourzat	FRA			
7	Kaitlyn Weaver / Andrew Poje	CAN			
8	Ekaterina Riazanova / Ilia Tkachenko	RUS			
9	Nelli Zhiganshina / Alexander Gazsi	GER			
10	Madison Chock / Evan Bates	USA			
