= Jane Summersett =

American ice dancer

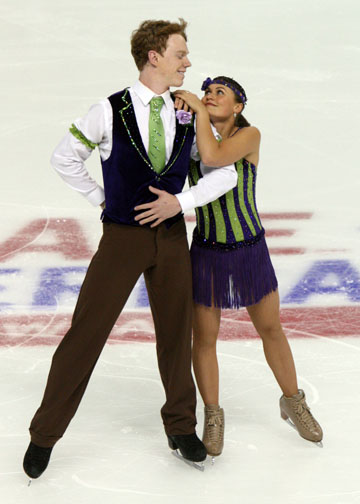
- Summersett and Gilles in 2008.

Personal information
- Born: December 24, 1987 (age 38) Marquette, Michigan
- Height: 5 ft 2 in (157 cm)

Figure skating career
- Country: United States
- Partner: Todd Gilles
- Coach: Elizabeth Punsalan, Pasquale Camerlengo, Angelika Krylova, Natalia Annenko Deller
- Skating club: Broadmoor SC
- Retired: 2010

Jane Summersett (born December 24, 1987) is an American former competitive ice dancer. She teamed up with Todd Gilles in April 2007. The two won the bronze medal at the 2008 Nebelhorn Trophy and placed seventh at the 2010 Four Continents Championships.

Earlier in her career, Summersett competed with Elliot Pennington. They won junior bronze medals at the 2005 ISU Junior Grand Prix in Poland and 2006 U.S. Championships.

Summersett attends the University of Detroit Mercy School of Dentistry.

== Programs ==
=== With Gilles ===
Season	Original dance	Free dance
2009–2010	Incantation (Peruvian panpipe music)	Whole Lotta Love performed by Tina Turner; Whole Lotta Love performed by Led Zeppelin; Babe I Gonna Leave You by Led Zeppelin
2008–2009	I'd Rather Be Blue (from the Funny Girl soundtrack) performed by Barbra Streisand	La Strada by Nino Rota
2007–2008	O Brother, Where Art Thou (soundtrack)	La Valtz by Maurice Ravel

=== With Pennington ===
Season	Original dance	Free dance
2005–2006	Cha Cha; Rhumba; Cha Cha	La Danza Della Streghe

== Competitive highlights ==
=== With Gilles ===
International
Event	2007–08	2008–09	2009–10
Four Continents Champ.			7th
GP NHK Trophy			10th
GP Skate America		7th	
Finlandia Trophy			5th
Nebelhorn Trophy		3rd	
Golden Spin of Zagreb	6th		
National
U.S. Championships	6th	6th	7th

=== With Pennington ===
International
Event	2004–05	2005–06
JGP Estonia		7th
JGP France	7th	
JGP Poland		3rd
National
U.S. Championships	5th J.	3rd J.
