= Yaroslava Nechaeva =

Figure skater

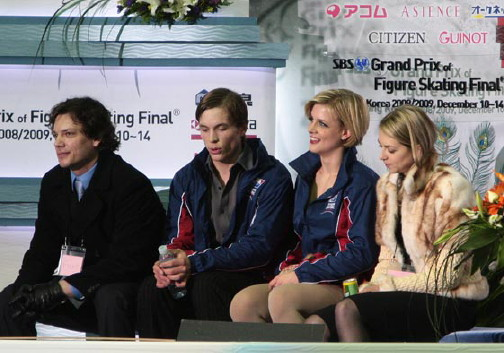
- Nechaeva (far right) with fellow coach Yuri Chesnichenko and students Hubbell & Hubbell at the 2008-2009 Junior Grand Prix Final.

Personal information
- Full name: Yaroslava Nechaeva

Yaroslava "Yasa" Nechaeva (Russian: Ярослава Нечаева, also romanized as Iaroslava Netchaeva) is a former ice dancer who competed with Yuri Chesnichenko for the Soviet Union, Russia, and Latvia. She currently lives in Ann Arbor, Michigan where she works as a coach.

== Career ==
Nechaeva was partnered with Yuri Chesnichenko when they were fourteen. They won the silver medal at the 1992 World Junior Championships for the Soviet Union. The following season, they won silver at the 1992 Skate Canada International competing for Russia. In their final season, they switched to Latvia and placed 13th at the 1994 European Championships.

After retiring from competition, Nechaeva/Chesnichenko performed on tour with Torvill/Dean's Ice Adventures. In 1999, they began coaching at the Ann Arbor Figure Skating Club in Ann Arbor, Michigan.

Among Nechaeva and Chesnichenko's current and former students are Emily Samuelson / Todd Gilles, Emily Samuelson / Evan Bates, Madison Hubbell / Keiffer Hubbell, and Lynn Kriengkrairut / Logan Giulietti-Schmitt. At the 2007 U.S. Championships, their teams swept the junior ice dancing podium.

== Competitive highlights ==
With Chesnichenko

International
Event	1991–1992 URS	1992–1993 RUS	1993–1994 LAT
European Championships			13th
World Junior Championships	2nd		
Skate Canada International		2nd	
