= Emily Samuelson =

American ice dancer

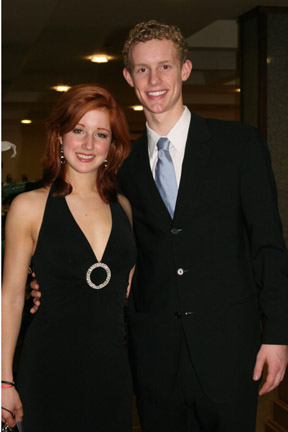
- Samuelson and Bates in 2008.

Personal information
- Born: May 14, 1990 (age 36) Southfield, Michigan
- Height: 5 ft 4 in (1.63 m)

Figure skating career
- Country: United States
- Partner: Todd Gilles, Evan Bates
- Coach: Yuri Chesnichenko; Yaroslava Nechaeva; Igor Shpilband; Marina Zueva; Choreographers: Tom Dickson; Christopher Dean; Marina Zueva; Yuri Chesnichenko; Yaroslava Nechaeva
- Skating club: Ann Arbor FSC (trained at Ann Arbor and Canton, Michigan)
- Began skating: 1995
Medal record
Figure skating: Ice dancing
Representing the United States
Four Continents Championships
| Bronze medal – third place | 2009 Vancouver | Ice dancing |
World Junior Championships
| Gold medal – first place | 2008 Sofia | Ice dancing |
Junior Grand Prix Final
| Silver medal – second place | 2006–07 Sofia | Ice dancing |
| Silver medal – second place | 2007–08 Gdansk | Ice dancing |

Emily Samuelson (born May 14, 1990) is an American former competitive ice dancer. With former partner Evan Bates, she is the 2009 Four Continents bronze medalist, the 2008 World Junior champion, and the 2009 U.S. national silver medalist. The duo competed at the 2010 Winter Olympics. Samuelson later skated with Todd Gilles.

== Personal life ==
Emily Samuelson was born in Southfield, Michigan. Due to her father's job, she also lived in Europe as a child. She was selected for the 2008 U.S. Figure Skating Scholastics Honors Team and graduated from Novi High School in spring 2008. In 2013, she received a degree in international studies, with a focus on political economy and development, from the University of Michigan.

As of 2026, she is a client advisor and certified financial planner at Ballentine Partners. She is married to Alex Dunford.

== Early years ==
Emily Samuelson began skating in autumn 1995 after being inspired by a skater she saw while vacationing with her family in Switzerland. She competed in single skating through the intermediate level and tested up to the novice level in the USFSA testing structure. At the age of nine, she began learning ice dancing at the suggestion of her coach, Karen Lingenfelter, who paired Samuelson with her son, Kurt. The two skated together for a few months.

== Partnership with Bates ==
=== Juvenile to novice ===
Samuelson teamed up with Evan Bates in May 2000 following the suggestion of their coach, Gary Clark. In the 2000–01 season, competing on the juvenile level, they won the pewter medal at their regional championship. This qualified them for the 2000–01 U.S. Junior Championships, where they won the bronze medal. Moving up to the intermediate level in the 2001–02 season, they won the silver medal at their regional championship. At the 2001–02 U.S. Junior Championships, they won the intermediate national title.

In the 2002–03 season, Samuelson/Bates moved up to the novice level. They competed internationally for the first time through the North American Challenge Skate program. They placed 10th on the novice level at the event in Thunder Bay, Ontario. They won the pewter medal at their regional championship to qualify for their sectional championship. At their sectional championship, they placed 6th and did not qualify for the 2003 U.S. Championships. Remaining as novices in the 2003–04 season, Samuelson/Bates won their regional championship to qualify for their sectional championship, where they won the silver medal. This qualified them for the 2004 U.S. Championships on the novice level. At nationals, they won the bronze medal. Their placement at nationals earned them a trip to the Estonia International Ice Dancing Championships on the novice level, where they won the silver medal. In the 2004–05 season, competing in their third season as novices, Samuelson/Bates won the silver medal at their regional championship and won their sectional championship to qualify for the 2005 U.S. Championships. At nationals, they won the novice title.

=== Junior career: World Junior champion and second Junior Grand Prix Final silver medalists ===
In the 2005–06 season, Samuelson/Bates moved up to the junior level. Their made their debut on the ISU Junior Grand Prix. At the 2005–06 ISU Junior Grand Prix event in Slovakia, they placed 6th in the compulsory dance, 10th in the original dance, and 6th in the free dance to place 8th overall. At the event in Sofia, Bulgaria, they placed 5th in all three segments of the competition and overall. They won their sectional championship to qualify for the 2006 U.S. Championships, where they won the silver medal on the junior level. This medal qualified them for a trip to the 2006 Junior Worlds, where they placed 10th.

In the 2006–07 season, Samuelson/Bates remained on the junior level. They competed on the 2006–07 ISU Junior Grand Prix. At their event in Mexico, they won all three segments of the competitions and won the gold medal overall. At their event in Taipei, they placed second in the compulsory dance and won the original and free dances to win the gold medal overall. These medals qualified them for the Junior Grand Prix Final. At the Junior Grand Prix Final, they placed second behind training mates Madison Hubbell / Keiffer Hubbell. Qualifying for the Junior Grand Prix Final had given them a bye to the 2007 U.S. Championships. Competing again against the Hubbells, Samuelson/Bates won the junior national title. They were placed on the team to the 2007 World Junior Championships. At Junior Worlds, they were in second place going into the free dance. However, they were forced to withdraw from the competition in the middle of their free dance due to injury. Samuelson fell shortly into the program, and Bates, in an effort to avoid colliding with her head, leaped over her and landed on Samuelson's left hand, and wound up severing the tendon in her middle finger. Their withdrawal, combined with the placement of the other American teams, meant the U.S. would only have two entries to the 2008 Junior Worlds.

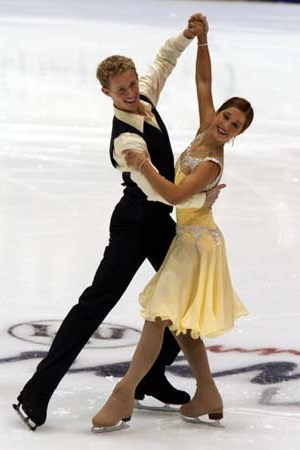
Samuelson and Bates perform the Viennese Waltz compulsory dance at the 2007–08 Junior Grand Prix event in Lake Placid, New York

In 2007–08, Samuelson/Bates remained juniors internationally, but moved up to seniors nationally. They began their season on the 2007–08 ISU Junior Grand Prix. Skating with a minor knee injury at their first Junior Grand Prix event, in Lake Placid, Samuelson/Bates won all three segments of the competition to win the gold medal overall. At their second event, they won both the compulsory and original dances, but placed second in the free dance, to win the gold medal overall. These medals qualified them for the 2007–08 Junior Grand Prix Final and also earned them a bye to the 2008 U.S. Championships. At the Junior Grand Prix Final, they placed third in the compulsory dance and second in the original and free dances to win the silver medal overall. At the U.S. Championships, Samuelson/Bates made their senior national debut. They placed fourth in the compulsory and original dances. In the free dance, Samuelson/Bates fell during a lift that had been inserted into the program for the senior program due to the different requirements between junior and senior level free dances. They placed 6th in the free dance and won the pewter medal, continuing their medal streak at the U.S. Championships. Their placement at the U.S. Championships earned them a trip to the 2008 World Junior Championships. At Junior Worlds, they won all three segments of the competition and won the title overall.

=== Senior career: Four Continents bronze ===
In the 2008–09 season, Samuelson/Bates moved up to the senior level internationally. Their first international competition of the season was the 2008 Nebelhorn Trophy. They placed second in the compulsory dance and won both the original and free dances to win the title overall. They made their senior Grand Prix debut at the 2008 Skate America, where they placed 5th in the compulsory dance, fourth in the original dance, and third in the free dance, to place fourth overall. At their second Grand Prix event, the 2008 NHK Trophy, they placed third in the compulsory dance and fourth in the original and free dances to win the bronze medal. At the 2009 U.S. Championships, they placed second in all three segments of the competition, and won the silver medal overall. It was their sixth consecutive medal at the U.S. Championships. This medal qualified them for the teams to the 2009 Four Continents and the 2009 World Championships. At the Four Continents, they placed fourth in the compulsory dance and then third in the original and free dances to win the bronze medal overall. At the World Championships, they placed 13th in the compulsory dance, 11th in the original dance, and 9th in the free dance to place 11th overall.

Samuelson/Bates had an up and down season in 2009–10, failing to medal in their two Grand Prix appearances but finishing 11th at their first Olympics and 9th at Worlds. On April 28, 2010, they announced that they would be leaving long-time coaches Yuri Chesnichenko and Yaroslava Nechaeva to train with Igor Shpilband and Marina Zueva in Canton, Michigan. In September 2010, Bates suffered a complete laceration of his Achilles tendon after Samuelson hit him with her skate blade as she came down from a lift. They missed the entire 2010–11 season as a result. In June 2011, it was reported that they had ended their partnership. On June 28, 2011, Samuelson and Bates confirmed that they had split and said that they were both looking for new partners.

== Partnership with Gilles ==
On August 22, 2011, Samuelson announced that she would be skating with Todd Gilles. In September, they revealed they would train in Ann Arbor, Michigan, coached by Nechaeva and Chesnichenko with choreography by Tom Dickson and Christopher Dean. In November 2011, they competed in their first event together, the 2011 Cup of China, where they finished 8th. At the time, they had been skating together for approximately two months, and had had their programs choreographed one month earlier. Samuelson and Gilles confirmed the end of their partnership in June 2012.

== Programs ==
=== Ice dance with Todd Gilles ===
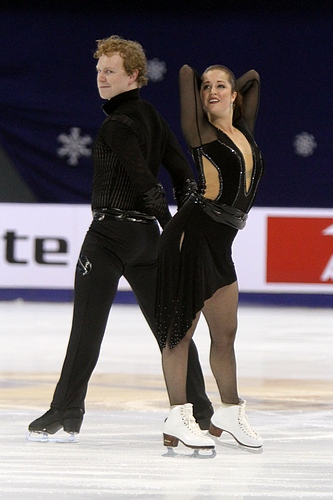
Emily Samuelson / Todd Gilles in 2011.

| Season | Short dance | Free dance |
|---|---|---|
| 2011–12 | Como Golondrinas by Angela Carrasco; Goldfinger by Perez Prado and his Orchestra choreo. by Tom Dickson | Stairway to Heaven by Mary J. Blige choreo. by Christopher Dean |

=== Ice dance with Evan Bates ===
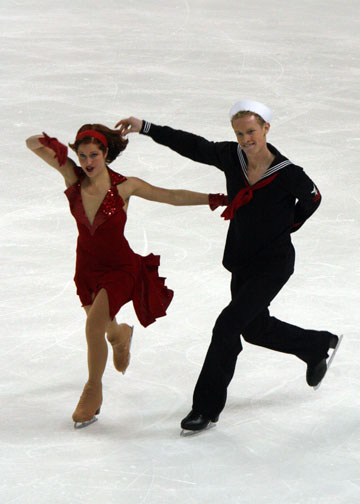
Samuelson and Bates perform their original dance at the 2008 Skate America.

| Season | Original dance | Free dance | Exhibition |
|---|---|---|---|
| 2001–2002 | | Let's Face the Music and Dance | |
| 2002–2003 | | Russian medley | |
| 2003–2004 | | Canned Heat Disco by Jamiroquai | |
| 2004–2005 | | Amore; Maria by Ricky Martin | |
| 2005–2006 | Besame by Andres Ballinas; Perfidia by Alberto Dominguez | Jingi by Toskiaki Tsushima; Battle Without Honor or Humanity (from Kill Bill) by Tomoyasu Hotei | |
| 2006–2007 | Quejas de Bandoneom | Thalia's Hits Remixed | |
| 2007–2008 | Kalinka; Russkie Napievi by Balalaika | Luna by Alessandro Safina | Bittersweet by Apocalyptica |
| 2008–2009 | Let Yourself Go by Irving Berlin | Amazonic by Tonči Huljić performed by Maksim Mrvica | You Should Be Dancing by the Bee Gees; Bittersweet by Apocalyptica |
| 2009–2010 | The Chicks medley | Canto della Terra by Francesco Sartori performed by Sarah Brightman, Andrea Bocelli | |
| 2010–2011 | Desde el Alma | An American in Paris by George Gershwin | |

== Competitive highlights ==
=== Ice dance with Todd Gilles ===
- GP – Event of the ISU Grand Prix Series

Competition placements at senior level
| Season | 2011–12 |
|---|---|
| GP Cup of China | 8th |
| U.S. Championships | 8th |

=== Ice dance with Evan Bates ===
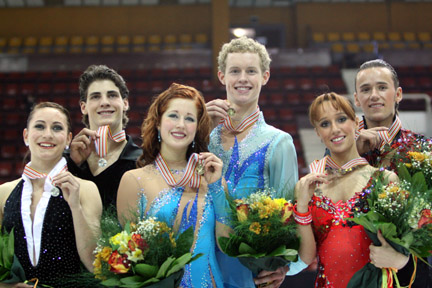
Samuelson and Bates (center) at the 2008 2008 World Junior Championships

- GP – Event of the ISU Grand Prix Series
- JGP – Event of the ISU Junior Grand Prix Series
- CS – Event of the ISU Challenger Series
- WD – Withdrew from competition
- At national events in the United States, pewter medals are awarded for fourth place.

Competition placements at junior level
| Season | 2005–06 | 2006–07 | 2007–08 |
|---|---|---|---|
| World Junior Championships | 10th | WD | 1st |
| Junior Grand Prix Final | | 2nd | 2nd |
| U.S. Championships | 2nd | 1st | |
| JGP Austria | | | 1st |
| JGP Bulgaria | 5th | | |
| JGP Chinese Taipei | | 1st | |
| JGP Mexico | | 1st | |
| JGP Slovakia | 8th | | |
| JGP United States | | | 1st |

Competition placements at senior level
| Season | 2007–08 | 2008–09 | 2009–10 |
|---|---|---|---|
| Winter Olympics | | | 11th |
| World Championships | | 11th | 9th |
| Four Continents Championships | | 3rd | |
| U.S. Championships | 4th | 2nd | 3rd |
| GP NHK Trophy | | 3rd | |
| GP Skate America | | 4th | |
| GP Skate Canada | | | 5th |
| GP Trophée Éric Bompard | | | 4th |
| CS Nebelhorn Trophy | | 1st | |

== Detailed results ==
=== Ice dance with Evan Bates ===
==== Senior level ====
Results in the 2007–08 season
| Date | Event | CD | | OD | | FD | | Total | |
| Date | Event | P | Score | P | Score | P | Score | P | Score |
|---|---|---|---|---|---|---|---|---|---|
| Jan 20–27, 2008 | (United States) 2008 U.S. Championships | 4 | 34.00 | 4 | 57.62 | 6 | 83.54 | 4 | 175.16 |

Results in the 2008–09 season
| Date | Event | CD | | OD | | FD | | Total | |
| Date | Event | P | Score | P | Score | P | Score | P | Score |
|---|---|---|---|---|---|---|---|---|---|
| Sep 25–29, 2008 | (Germany) 2008 Nebelhorn Trophy | 2 | 34.53 | 1 | 53.36 | 1 | 88.26 | 1 | 176.15 |
| Oct 23–26, 2008 | (United States) 2008 Skate America | 5 | 31.81 | 4 | 55.01 | 3 | 88.84 | 4 | 175.66 |
| Nov 27–30, 2008 | (Japan) 2008 NHK Trophy | 3 | 32.18 | 4 | 50.92 | 4 | 78.35 | 3 | 161.45 |
| Jan 18–25, 2009 | (United States) 2009 U.S. Championships | 2 | 36.28 | 2 | 56.97 | 2 | 88.39 | 2 | 181.64 |
| Feb 2–8, 2009 | (Canada) 2009 Four Continents Championships | 4 | 31.41 | 3 | 59.48 | 3 | 89.90 | 3 | 180.79 |
| Mar 23–29, 2009 | (United States) 2009 World Championships | 13 | 32.51 | 11 | 54.97 | 9 | 87.28 | 11 | 174.76 |

Results in the 2009–10 season
| Date | Event | CD | | OD | | FD | | Total | |
| Date | Event | P | Score | P | Score | P | Score | P | Score |
|---|---|---|---|---|---|---|---|---|---|
| Oct 15–18, 2009 | (France) 2009 Trophée Éric Bompard | 4 | 31.11 | 6 | 46.55 | 5 | 80.41 | 4 | 158.07 |
| Nov 19–22, 2009 | 2009 Skate Canada International | 4 | 31.47 | 3 | 51.49 | 5 | 77.80 | 5 | 160.76 |
| Jan 14–24, 2010 | (United States) 2010 U.S. Championships | 4 | 37.36 | 3 | 59.60 | 3 | 93.73 | 3 | 190.69 |
| Feb 19–22, 2010 | (Canada) 2010 Winter Olympics | 14 | 31.37 | 11 | 53.99 | 11 | 88.94 | 11 | 174.30 |
| Mar 22–28, 2010 | (Italy) 2010 World Championships | 10 | 32.61 | 10 | 52.79 | 10 | 83.37 | 9 | 168.77 |

==== Junior level ====
Results in the 2005–06 season
| Date | Event | CD | | OD | | FD | | Total | |
| Date | Event | P | Score | P | Score | P | Score | P | Score |
|---|---|---|---|---|---|---|---|---|---|
| Mar 6–12, 2005 | 2005 JGP Slovakia | 6 | 27.51 | 10 | 34.30 | 6 | 64.15 | 8 | 125.96 |
| Sep 29–Oct 2, 2005 | 2005 JGP Bulgaria | 5 | 30.13 | 5 | 43.42 | 5 | 67.13 | 5 | 140.68 |
| Jan 7–15, 2006 | (United States) 2006 U.S. Championships | 2 | 32.94 | 2 | 51.07 | 2 | 76.23 | 2 | 160.24 |
| Mar 6–12, 2006 | (Slovenia) 2006 World Junior Championships | 10 | 27.28 | 10 | 43.91 | 11 | 62.97 | 10 | 134.16 |

Results in the 2006–07 season
| Date | Event | CD | | OD | | FD | | Total | |
| Date | Event | P | Score | P | Score | P | Score | P | Score |
|---|---|---|---|---|---|---|---|---|---|
| Sep 12–17, 2006 | 2006 JGP Mexico | 1 | 32.33 | 1 | 52.32 | 1 | 71.10 | 1 | 155.75 |
| Oct 11–14, 2006 | 2006 JGP Chinese Taipei | 2 | 30.33 | 1 | 51.38 | 1 | 72.00 | 1 | 153.71 |
| Dec 7–10, 2006 | (Bulgaria) 2006–07 Junior Grand Prix Final | 3 | 31.24 | 2 | 50.11 | 2 | 70.63 | 2 | 151.98 |
| Jan 21–28, 2007 | (United States) 2007 U.S. Championships | 1 | 35.75 | 2 | 50.63 | 1 | 81.27 | 1 | 167.65 |
| Feb 26–Mar 4, 2007 | (Germany) 2007 World Junior Championships | 4 | 31.18 | 2 | 53.98 | WD | —N/a | WD | —N/a |

Results in the 2007–08 season
| Date | Event | CD | | OD | | FD | | Total | |
| Date | Event | P | Score | P | Score | P | Score | P | Score |
|---|---|---|---|---|---|---|---|---|---|
| Aug 30–Sep 2, 2007 | 2007 JGP United States | 1 | 30.76 | 1 | 51.72 | 1 | 72.94 | 1 | 155.42 |
| Sep 12–15, 2007 | 2007 JGP Austria | 1 | 34.38 | 2 | 51.73 | 1 | 85.73 | 1 | 171.84 |
| Dec 6–9, 2007 | (Poland) 2007–08 Junior Grand Prix Final | 3 | 31.70 | 2 | 55.66 | 2 | 84.49 | 2 | 171.85 |
| Feb 25–Mar 2, 2008 | (Bulgaria) 2008 World Junior Championships | 1 | 35.11 | 1 | 57.84 | 1 | 88.71 | 1 | 181.66 |
