= Todd Gilles =

American ice dancer

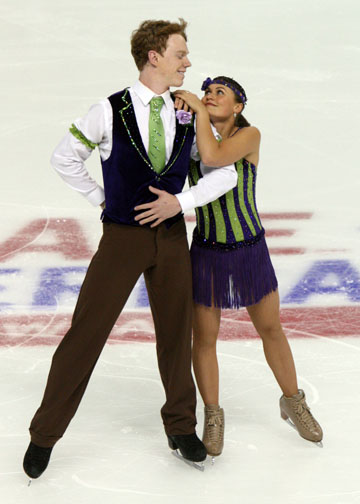
- Summersett and Gilles in 2008.

Personal information
- Born: April 14, 1986 (age 40) Rockford, Illinois
- Height: 6 ft 0 in (1.83 m)

Figure skating career
- Country: United States
- Skating club: Broadmoor SC
- Began skating: 1990
- Retired: 2012

Todd Gilles (born April 14, 1986) is an American former ice dancer. With Trina Pratt, he won four ISU Junior Grand Prix medals and the 2005 U.S. national junior title, and placed sixth at the 2006 World Junior Championships. With Jane Summersett, he is the 2008 Nebelhorn Trophy bronze medalist. He also skated with Emily Samuelson for one season.

== Personal life ==
Todd Gilles was born in Rockford, Illinois. He has three younger sisters: Piper, who competes for Canada in ice dancing; Alexe, a single skater; and Shelby Gilles, who is not in the ice dancing scene. He also has a younger brother, Kemper Gilles. All five of the Gilles children attended Cheyenne Mountain High School. He enjoys mountaineering.

== Career ==
Gilles teamed up with Trina Pratt at the 2002 Lake Placid, New York, dance competition. They won the 2003 US National Novice title, as well as, the 2005 US National Junior title. After a promising start on the senior international circuit, they announced the ending of their partnership on December 13, 2006, with Pratt deciding to take a break from competitive skating.

Gilles teamed up with Jane Summersett in April 2007. Their best result was a bronze medal at the 2008 Nebelhorn Trophy. After Summersett retired from competitive skating in 2010, he worked as a skating coach in Lake Placid.

On August 22, 2011, Gilles and Emily Samuelson announced their newly formed partnership. In September, they revealed they would train in Ann Arbor, Michigan, coached by Nechaeva and Chesnichenko with choreography by Tom Dickson and Christopher Dean. In November 2011, they competed in their first event together, the 2011 Cup of China, where they finished 8th. At the time, they had been skating together for approximately two months, and had had their programs choreographed one month earlier. Samuelson and Gilles confirmed the end of their partnership in June 2012.

== Programs ==
=== With Samuelson ===
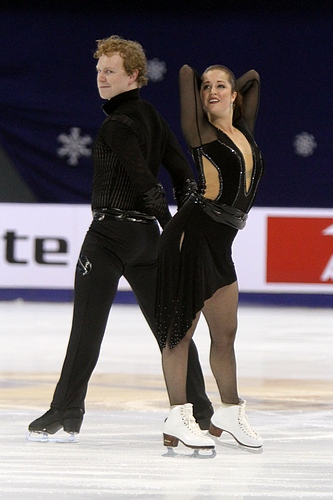
Samuelson/Gilles at the 2011 Cup of China

Season	Short dance	Free dance
2011–2012	Como Golondrinas by Angela Carrasco; Goldfinger by Perez Prado and his Orchestra choreo. by Tom Dickson	Stairway to Heaven by Mary J. Blige choreo. by Christopher Dean

=== With Summersett ===
Season	Original dance	Free dance
2009–2010	Incantation (Peruvian panpipe music)	Whole Lotta Love performed by Tina Turner; Whole Lotta Love performed by Led Zeppelin; Babe I Gonna Leave You by Led Zeppelin
2008–2009	I'd Rather Be Blue (from the Funny Girl soundtrack) performed by Barbra Streisand	La Strada by Nino Rota
2007–2008	O Brother, Where Art Thou (soundtrack)	La Valtz by Maurice Ravel

=== With Pratt ===
Season	Original dance	Free dance
2006–2007	La Yumba; Whatever Lola Wants	Dream On by Aerosmith
2005–2006	Mas Que Nada; Meditation by Brazilian 66	House of Flying Daggers; Kodo Drums
2004–2005	Won't You Charleston With Me?; Let There Be Love by Nat King Cole; Let Yourself Go	Romeo + Juliet
2003–2004	Big Bad Voodoo Daddy	Goldfrapp

== Competitive highlights ==
GP: Grand Prix; JGP: Junior Grand Prix

=== With Samuelson ===
International
Event	2011–12
GP Cup of China	8th
National
U.S. Championships	8th

=== With Summersett ===
International
Event	2007–08	2008–09	2009–10
Four Continents Champ.			7th
GP NHK Trophy			10th
GP Skate America		7th	
Finlandia Trophy			5th
Nebelhorn Trophy		3rd	
Golden Spin of Zagreb	6th		
National
U.S. Championships	6th	6th	7th

=== With Pratt ===
International
Event	03–04	04–05	05–06	06–07
GP NHK Trophy				7th
GP Skate Canada				9th
International: Junior
Junior Worlds		8th	6th	
JGP Final			8th	
JGP Bulgaria	7th			
JGP China		3rd		
JGP Croatia			2nd	
JGP Hungary		3rd		
JGP Slovakia			3rd	
National
U.S. Champ.	3rd J	1st J	8th	
J = Junior
