= Logan Giulietti-Schmitt =

American ice dancer

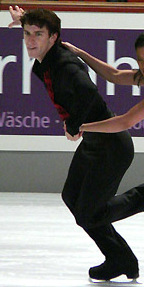
- Logan Giulietti-Schmitt

Personal information
- Born: August 16, 1985 (age 41) Chicago, Illinois, U.S.
- Height: 5 ft 9 in (1.75 m)

Figure skating career
- Country: United States
- Partner: Lynn Kriengkrairut
- Skating club: All Year FSC
- Began skating: 1988
- Retired: April 24, 2014

Logan Giulietti-Schmitt (born August 16, 1985) is an American former competitive ice dancer. With partner Lynn Kriengkrairut, he is a two-time (2011–2012) Ice Challenge champion and the 2012 U.S. national pewter medalist.

== Career ==
Giulietti-Schmitt began learning to skate at age three and a half. He competed in single skating until 2004, when he sustained a stress fracture in his lower back. Having started ice dancing in 1999, he competed with Caitlin Morocco on the intermediate level and with Mauri Gustafson on the junior level. His partnership with Gustafson came to an end in late June 2006, leaving him with little time to find a new partner for the next season.

Giulietti-Schmitt contacted Lynn Kriengkrairut after seeing her on IcePartnerSearch. They began skating together in July 2006, agreeing to form a partnership on the second day of a planned three-day tryout. The two were coached by Yuri Chesnichenko and Yaroslava Nechaeva from the start of their partnership. They won the junior bronze medal at the 2007 U.S. Championships in their first season together.

Kriengkrairut/Giulietti-Schmitt received a host invitation to compete at 2010 Skate America where they finished 6th. At the 2011 U.S. Championships, they were in fourth after the short dance but dropped to fifth overall after a fall at the end of their free dance.

At the 2012 U.S. Championships, Kriengkrairut/Giulietti-Schmitt placed fourth in both segments and won the pewter medal. The following season, they were fifth at the 2013 U.S. Championships. They changed coaches in February 2013, joining Igor Shpilband in Novi, Michigan. Kriengkrairut sustained a concussion in late June 2013. The two decided to retire from competition on April 24, 2014.

Giulietti-Schmitt was the director of the Learn To Skate program at Ann Arbor Skating Club August 2008 thru August 2014.

== Personal life ==
In December 2008, Giulietti-Schmitt earned a bachelor's degree in geology from Eastern Michigan University.

== Programs ==
(with Kriengkrairut)

Season	Short dance	Free dance	Exhibition
2013–2014	Quickstep: That Man by Caro Emerald; Charleston: Jolie Coquine by Caravan Palace	Spartacus by Aram Khachaturian	
2012–2013	Ring of Fire; Can't Help Falling in Love performed by Chris Isaak	Turning Tables; Rumor Has It by Adele	Tighten Up by The Black Keys
2011–2012	Hielo y Fuego by Olga Tañón; La Vuelta by Gizelle D'Cole	Walking in the Sand by Jeff Beck and Imelda May	
2010–2011	The Trouble With Love Is by Kelly Clarkson	I Belong To You by Muse	
	Original dance		
2009–2010	Mexican folk: Selections by Alejandro Fernandez	Slumdog Millionaire by A.R. Rahman: Dreams on Fire; Mausam and Escape	
2008–2009	Boogie Woogie Bugle Boy; I Want To Linger by the Andrews Sisters	Jingi; Kill The Target by Tomoyasu Hotei	
2007–2008	Russian Gypsy dance: Heyka by Oleg Ponomarev; Nane Tsokha by Valentina Ponomareva	Verano Porteno by Astor Piazolla	
2006–2007	Primavera Portena by Astor Piazzolla	I Got Rhythm; I Like That You Can't Take That Away From Me by George Gershwin (from Take the Lead)	

== Competitive highlights ==
=== With Kriengkrairut ===
International
Event	2006–07	2007–08	2008–09	2009–10	2010–11	2011–12	2012–13	2013–14
Four Continents								6th
GP Cup of Russia		10th						
GP NHK Trophy						6th		
GP Skate America					6th		4th	
Ice Challenge				2nd		1st	1st	
Karl Schäfer Mem.			2nd					
Nebelhorn Trophy		8th			6th			
U.S. Classic							3rd	4th
International: Junior
Junior Worlds	11th							
National
U.S. Championships	3rd J.	9th	8th	8th	5th	4th	5th	6th

=== With Gustafson ===
International
Event	2004–05	2005–06
JGP Estonia		6th
JGP Japan		8th
National
U.S. Championships	10th J.	10th J.
