= 2008–09 ISU World Standings =

Merit-based ice skating ranking

Season-end No. 1 skaters
- Men's singles: (Czech Republic) Tomáš Verner
- Ladies' singles: (South Korea) Yuna Kim
- Pairs: (Germany) Aliona Savchenko / Robin Szolkowy
- Ice dance: (Russia) Oksana Domnina / Maxim Shabalin

Navigation

The 2008–09 ISU World Standings are the World Standings published by the International Skating Union (ISU) during the 2008–09 season.

The 2008–09 ISU World Standings for single & pair skating and ice dance, are taking into account results of the 2006–07, 2007–08 and 2008–09 seasons.

== World Standings for single & pair skating and ice dance ==
=== Season-end standings ===
The remainder of this section is a complete list, by discipline, published by the ISU.

==== Men's singles (185 skaters) ====
As of 27 March 2009

Rank	Nation	Skater	Points	Season	ISU Championships or Olympics	(Junior) Grand Prix and Final		Selected International Competition	
Rank	Nation	Skater	Points	Season	Best	Best	2nd Best	Best	2nd Best
1	CZE	Tomáš Verner	4092	2008/2009 season (100%)	875	583	360	203	182
1	CZE	Tomáš Verner	4092	2007/2008 season (100%)	840	360	236	250	203
1	CZE	Tomáš Verner	4092	2006/2007 season (70%)	613	204	183	175	158
2	FRA	Brian Joubert	3704	2008/2009 season (100%)	972	400	292	0	0
2	FRA	Brian Joubert	3704	2007/2008 season (100%)	1080	400	0	0	0
2	FRA	Brian Joubert	3704	2006/2007 season (70%)	840	560	280	0	0
3	BEL	Kevin van der Perren	3589	2008/2009 season (100%)	680	236	0	250	225
3	BEL	Kevin van der Perren	3589	2007/2008 season (100%)	709	472	360	250	203
3	BEL	Kevin van der Perren	3589	2006/2007 season (70%)	476	204	165	0	0
4	USA	Evan Lysacek	3536	2008/2009 season (100%)	1200	324	324	0	0
4	USA	Evan Lysacek	3536	2007/2008 season (100%)	680	648	360	0	0
4	USA	Evan Lysacek	3536	2006/2007 season (70%)	588	280	252	0	0
5	JPN	Daisuke Takahashi	3535	2008/2009 season (100%)	0	0	0	0	0
5	JPN	Daisuke Takahashi	3535	2007/2008 season (100%)	875	720	400	0	0
5	JPN	Daisuke Takahashi	3535	2006/2007 season (70%)	756	504	280	0	0
6	CAN	Patrick Chan	3447	2008/2009 season (100%)	1080	525	400	0	0
6	CAN	Patrick Chan	3447	2007/2008 season (100%)	517	525	400	0	0
6	CAN	Patrick Chan	3447	2006/2007 season (70%)	451	183	149	0	0
7	USA	Johnny Weir	3365	2008/2009 season (100%)	0	648	360	0	0
7	USA	Johnny Weir	3365	2007/2008 season (100%)	972	583	400	0	0
7	USA	Johnny Weir	3365	2006/2007 season (70%)	402	252	227	0	0
8	USA	Jeremy Abbott	2960	2008/2009 season (100%)	551	800	400	0	0
8	USA	Jeremy Abbott	2960	2007/2008 season (100%)	551	292	191	0	0
8	USA	Jeremy Abbott	2960	2006/2007 season (70%)	476	0	0	175	0
9	SUI	Stéphane Lambiel	2907	2008/2009 season (100%)	0	0	0	0	0
9	SUI	Stéphane Lambiel	2907	2007/2008 season (100%)	787	800	360	0	0
9	SUI	Stéphane Lambiel	2907	2006/2007 season (70%)	680	280	0	0	0
10	JPN	Takahiko Kozuka	2892	2008/2009 season (100%)	709	720	400	0	0
10	JPN	Takahiko Kozuka	2892	2007/2008 season (100%)	574	262	191	0	0
10	JPN	Takahiko Kozuka	2892	2006/2007 season (70%)	0	227	165	0	0
11	USA	Adam Rippon	2733	2008/2009 season (100%)	715	262	191	0	0
11	USA	Adam Rippon	2733	2007/2008 season (100%)	715	600	250	0	0
11	USA	Adam Rippon	2733	2006/2007 season (70%)	0	0	0	0	0
12	JPN	Nobunari Oda	2719	2008/2009 season (100%)	638	400	0	250	250
12	JPN	Nobunari Oda	2719	2007/2008 season (100%)	0	0	0	0	0
12	JPN	Nobunari Oda	2719	2006/2007 season (70%)	447	454	280	0	0
13	FRA	Yannick Ponsero	2667	2008/2009 season (100%)	612	324	292	250	203
13	FRA	Yannick Ponsero	2667	2007/2008 season (100%)	264	236	236	250	0
13	FRA	Yannick Ponsero	2667	2006/2007 season (70%)	214	165	149	0	0
14	CZE	Michal Brezina	2561	2008/2009 season (100%)	644	250	250	225	0
14	CZE	Michal Brezina	2561	2007/2008 season (100%)	469	225	133	250	0
14	CZE	Michal Brezina	2561	2006/2007 season (70%)	103	115	0	115	0
15	USA	Stephen Carriere	2509	2008/2009 season (100%)	0	360	236	0	0
15	USA	Stephen Carriere	2509	2007/2008 season (100%)	612	324	292	0	0
15	USA	Stephen Carriere	2509	2006/2007 season (70%)	501	420	175	0	0
16	FRA	Alban Préaubert	2503	2008/2009 season (100%)	551	324	324	225	0
16	FRA	Alban Préaubert	2503	2007/2008 season (100%)	325	324	262	0	0
16	FRA	Alban Préaubert	2503	2006/2007 season (70%)	347	408	252	0	0
17	USA	Brandon Mroz	2468	2008/2009 season (100%)	517	262	213	0	0
17	USA	Brandon Mroz	2468	2007/2008 season (100%)	521	540	250	0	0
17	USA	Brandon Mroz	2468	2006/2007 season (70%)	365	378	175	0	0
18	CAN	Jeffrey Buttle	2345	2008/2009 season (100%)	0	0	0	0	0
18	CAN	Jeffrey Buttle	2345	2007/2008 season (100%)	1200	324	292	0	0
18	CAN	Jeffrey Buttle	2345	2006/2007 season (70%)	529	0	0	0	0
19	RUS	Sergei Voronov	2204	2008/2009 season (100%)	362	236	213	203	0
19	RUS	Sergei Voronov	2204	2007/2008 season (100%)	638	360	0	0	0
19	RUS	Sergei Voronov	2204	2006/2007 season (70%)	405	149	0	0	0
20	RUS	Artem Borodulin	1878	2008/2009 season (100%)	237	292	0	0	0
20	RUS	Artem Borodulin	1878	2007/2008 season (100%)	644	250	203	0	0
20	RUS	Artem Borodulin	1878	2006/2007 season (70%)	266	223	158	0	0
21	CAN	Kevin Reynolds	1865	2008/2009 season (100%)	308	292	292	0	0
21	CAN	Kevin Reynolds	1865	2007/2008 season (100%)	422	191	0	0	0
21	CAN	Kevin Reynolds	1865	2006/2007 season (70%)	328	340	175	0	0
22	SWE	Kristoffer Berntsson	1787	2008/2009 season (100%)	402	191	191	0	0
22	SWE	Kristoffer Berntsson	1787	2007/2008 season (100%)	446	0	0	250	0
22	SWE	Kristoffer Berntsson	1787	2006/2007 season (70%)	362	165	0	142	0
23	BLR	Sergei Davydov	1768	2008/2009 season (100%)	0	0	0	0	0
23	BLR	Sergei Davydov	1768	2007/2008 season (100%)	377	292	236	0	0
23	BLR	Sergei Davydov	1768	2006/2007 season (70%)	428	252	183	0	0
24	CAN	Vaughn Chipeur	1757	2008/2009 season (100%)	496	262	0	0	0
24	CAN	Vaughn Chipeur	1757	2007/2008 season (100%)	446	262	0	0	0
24	CAN	Vaughn Chipeur	1757	2006/2007 season (70%)	0	149	0	142	0
25	JPN	Takahito Mura	1738	2008/2009 season (100%)	275	262	0	250	0
25	JPN	Takahito Mura	1738	2007/2008 season (100%)	107	203	203	0	0
25	JPN	Takahito Mura	1738	2006/2007 season (70%)	239	306	158	0	0
26	SWE	Adrian Schultheiss	1677	2008/2009 season (100%)	200	213	213	0	0
26	SWE	Adrian Schultheiss	1677	2007/2008 season (100%)	496	182	148	225	0
26	SWE	Adrian Schultheiss	1677	2006/2007 season (70%)	127	115	104	0	0
27	CHN	Jinlin Guan	1676	2008/2009 season (100%)	0	0	0	0	0
27	CHN	Jinlin Guan	1676	2007/2008 season (100%)	579	394	250	0	0
27	CHN	Jinlin Guan	1676	2006/2007 season (70%)	295	158	0	0	0
28	KAZ	Denis Ten	1610	2008/2009 season (100%)	574	394	250	0	0
28	KAZ	Denis Ten	1610	2007/2008 season (100%)	147	148	97	0	0
28	KAZ	Denis Ten	1610	2006/2007 season (70%)	0	68	0	0	0
29	FRA	Florent Amodio	1588	2008/2009 season (100%)	164	600	250	0	0
29	FRA	Florent Amodio	1588	2007/2008 season (100%)	277	164	133	0	0
29	FRA	Florent Amodio	1588	2006/2007 season (70%)	115	127	0	0	0
30	RUS	Ivan Bariev	1586	2008/2009 season (100%)	0	437	225	0	0
30	RUS	Ivan Bariev	1586	2007/2008 season (100%)	380	319	225	0	0
30	RUS	Ivan Bariev	1586	2006/2007 season (70%)	0	0	0	0	0
31	JPN	Kensuke Nakaniwa	1546	2008/2009 season (100%)	0	0	0	250	164
31	JPN	Kensuke Nakaniwa	1546	2007/2008 season (100%)	264	213	191	0	0
31	JPN	Kensuke Nakaniwa	1546	2006/2007 season (70%)	281	183	0	0	0
32	USA	Armin Mahbanoozadeh	1526	2008/2009 season (100%)	0	540	250	0	0
32	USA	Armin Mahbanoozadeh	1526	2007/2008 season (100%)	0	486	250	0	0
32	USA	Armin Mahbanoozadeh	1526	2006/2007 season (70%)	0	0	0	0	0
33	USA	Ryan Bradley	1499	2008/2009 season (100%)	0	360	213	0	0
33	USA	Ryan Bradley	1499	2007/2008 season (100%)	0	262	236	0	0
33	USA	Ryan Bradley	1499	2006/2007 season (70%)	428	134	0	0	0
34	ITA	Samuel Contesti	1487	2008/2009 season (100%)	787	0	0	250	225
34	ITA	Samuel Contesti	1487	2007/2008 season (100%)	0	0	0	225	0
34	ITA	Samuel Contesti	1487	2006/2007 season (70%)	0	0	0	0	0
35	CAN	Jeremy Ten	1473	2008/2009 season (100%)	446	213	0	0	0
35	CAN	Jeremy Ten	1473	2007/2008 season (100%)	342	203	120	0	0
35	CAN	Jeremy Ten	1473	2006/2007 season (70%)	0	142	127	0	0
36	RUS	Andrei Lutai	1382	2008/2009 season (100%)	465	0	0	0	0
36	RUS	Andrei Lutai	1382	2007/2008 season (100%)	402	213	0	0	0
36	RUS	Andrei Lutai	1382	2006/2007 season (70%)	386	0	0	175	127
37	CHN	Jialiang Wu	1367	2008/2009 season (100%)	325	236	191	0	0
37	CHN	Jialiang Wu	1367	2007/2008 season (100%)	325	0	0	0	0
37	CHN	Jialiang Wu	1367	2006/2007 season (70%)	347	134	134	0	0
38	JPN	Yasuharu Nanri	1331	2008/2009 season (100%)	264	191	191	250	250
38	JPN	Yasuharu Nanri	1331	2007/2008 season (100%)	180	0	0	0	0
38	JPN	Yasuharu Nanri	1331	2006/2007 season (70%)	185	0	0	0	0
39	CHN	Chao Yang	1326	2008/2009 season (100%)	422	225	148	0	0
39	CHN	Chao Yang	1326	2007/2008 season (100%)	164	203	164	0	0
39	CHN	Chao Yang	1326	2006/2007 season (70%)	0	115	0	0	0
40	CAN	Shawn Sawyer	1303	2008/2009 season (100%)	0	262	262	0	0
40	CAN	Shawn Sawyer	1303	2007/2008 season (100%)	362	213	0	0	0
40	CAN	Shawn Sawyer	1303	2006/2007 season (70%)	0	204	134	0	0
41	USA	Curran Oi	1292	2008/2009 season (100%)	469	225	164	0	0
41	USA	Curran Oi	1292	2007/2008 season (100%)	0	148	0	0	0
41	USA	Curran Oi	1292	2006/2007 season (70%)	0	276	158	0	0
42	SLO	Gregor Urbas	1289	2008/2009 season (100%)	146	0	0	0	0
42	SLO	Gregor Urbas	1289	2007/2008 season (100%)	293	0	0	250	203
42	SLO	Gregor Urbas	1289	2006/2007 season (70%)	253	0	0	175	115
43	CZE	Pavel Kaska	1286	2008/2009 season (100%)	0	0	0	182	182
43	CZE	Pavel Kaska	1286	2007/2008 season (100%)	0	213	0	182	182
43	CZE	Pavel Kaska	1286	2006/2007 season (70%)	88	142	115	0	0
44	RUS	Artem Grigoriev	1242	2008/2009 season (100%)	579	164	0	0	0
44	RUS	Artem Grigoriev	1242	2007/2008 season (100%)	0	203	203	0	0
44	RUS	Artem Grigoriev	1242	2006/2007 season (70%)	0	93	93	0	0
45	CAN	Elladj Balde	1210	2008/2009 season (100%)	342	319	225	0	0
45	CAN	Elladj Balde	1210	2007/2008 season (100%)	87	133	0	0	0
45	CAN	Elladj Balde	1210	2006/2007 season (70%)	0	104	68	0	0
46	SUI	Jamal Othman	1142	2008/2009 season (100%)	264	0	0	203	203
46	SUI	Jamal Othman	1142	2007/2008 season (100%)	131	191	0	0	0
46	SUI	Jamal Othman	1142	2006/2007 season (70%)	281	0	0	0	0
47	ESP	Javier Fernandez	1136	2008/2009 season (100%)	293	182	148	203	0
47	ESP	Javier Fernandez	1136	2007/2008 season (100%)	202	108	0	0	0
47	ESP	Javier Fernandez	1136	2006/2007 season (70%)	0	0	0	0	0
48	FRA	Mark Vaillant	1094	2008/2009 season (100%)	119	164	0	203	0
48	FRA	Mark Vaillant	1094	2007/2008 season (100%)	0	148	120	225	0
48	FRA	Mark Vaillant	1094	2006/2007 season (70%)	0	115	104	0	0
49	RUS	Alexander Uspenski	1052	2008/2009 season (100%)	0	236	0	0	0
49	RUS	Alexander Uspenski	1052	2007/2008 season (100%)	0	262	213	0	0
49	RUS	Alexander Uspenski	1052	2006/2007 season (70%)	0	183	165	158	0
50	ITA	Karel Zelenka	1037	2008/2009 season (100%)	0	0	0	0	0
50	ITA	Karel Zelenka	1037	2007/2008 season (100%)	247	236	0	0	0
50	ITA	Karel Zelenka	1037	2006/2007 season (70%)	312	0	0	127	115
51	RUS	Artur Gachinski	1024	2008/2009 season (100%)	0	287	225	0	0
51	RUS	Artur Gachinski	1024	2007/2008 season (100%)	0	287	225	0	0
51	RUS	Artur Gachinski	1024	2006/2007 season (70%)	0	0	0	0	0
52	ITA	Paolo Bacchini	1008	2008/2009 season (100%)	0	0	0	225	225
52	ITA	Paolo Bacchini	1008	2007/2008 season (100%)	126	0	0	250	182
52	ITA	Paolo Bacchini	1008	2006/2007 season (70%)	0	0	0	0	0
53	CHN	Chengjiang Li	993	2008/2009 season (100%)	293	0	0	0	0
53	CHN	Chengjiang Li	993	2007/2008 season (100%)	496	0	0	0	0
53	CHN	Chengjiang Li	993	2006/2007 season (70%)	0	204	0	0	0
53	GER	Peter Liebers	993	2008/2009 season (100%)	192	236	0	164	164
53	GER	Peter Liebers	993	2007/2008 season (100%)	237	0	0	0	0
53	GER	Peter Liebers	993	2006/2007 season (70%)	0	0	0	0	0
55	USA	Austin Kanallakan	980	2008/2009 season (100%)	0	120	0	0	0
55	USA	Austin Kanallakan	980	2007/2008 season (100%)	0	354	250	0	0
55	USA	Austin Kanallakan	980	2006/2007 season (70%)	0	201	175	0	0
56	RUS	Andrei Griazev	956	2008/2009 season (100%)	0	0	0	0	0
56	RUS	Andrei Griazev	956	2007/2008 season (100%)	0	324	213	0	0
56	RUS	Andrei Griazev	956	2006/2007 season (70%)	121	149	149	0	0
57	JPN	Tatsuki Machida	954	2008/2009 season (100%)	0	203	0	0	0
57	JPN	Tatsuki Machida	954	2007/2008 season (100%)	0	250	108	0	0
57	JPN	Tatsuki Machida	954	2006/2007 season (70%)	216	158	127	0	0
58	FRA	Kim Lucine	948	2008/2009 season (100%)	0	0	0	0	0
58	FRA	Kim Lucine	948	2007/2008 season (100%)	249	164	148	0	0
58	FRA	Kim Lucine	948	2006/2007 season (70%)	157	115	115	0	0
59	SVK	Igor Macypura	929	2008/2009 season (100%)	173	0	0	203	0
59	SVK	Igor Macypura	929	2007/2008 season (100%)	146	0	0	225	182
59	SVK	Igor Macypura	929	2006/2007 season (70%)	109	0	0	0	0
60	CHN	Nan Song	890	2008/2009 season (100%)	380	164	164	0	0
60	CHN	Nan Song	890	2007/2008 season (100%)	0	182	0	0	0
60	CHN	Nan Song	890	2006/2007 season (70%)	0	0	0	0	0
61	USA	Richard Dornbush	884	2008/2009 season (100%)	0	486	250	0	0
61	USA	Richard Dornbush	884	2007/2008 season (100%)	0	148	0	0	0
61	USA	Richard Dornbush	884	2006/2007 season (70%)	0	0	0	0	0
62	USA	Tommy Steenberg	879	2008/2009 season (100%)	0	0	0	0	0
62	USA	Tommy Steenberg	879	2007/2008 season (100%)	308	148	0	0	0
62	USA	Tommy Steenberg	879	2006/2007 season (70%)	0	248	175	0	0
63	CAN	Christopher Mabee	869	2008/2009 season (100%)	0	0	0	0	0
63	CAN	Christopher Mabee	869	2007/2008 season (100%)	0	292	191	0	0
63	CAN	Christopher Mabee	869	2006/2007 season (70%)	386	0	0	0	0
64	UKR	Nikolai Bondar	865	2008/2009 season (100%)	249	97	0	0	0
64	UKR	Nikolai Bondar	865	2007/2008 season (100%)	182	164	97	0	0
64	UKR	Nikolai Bondar	865	2006/2007 season (70%)	0	76	0	0	0
65	RUS	Sergei Dobrin	863	2008/2009 season (100%)	0	0	0	0	0
65	RUS	Sergei Dobrin	863	2007/2008 season (100%)	0	262	0	0	0
65	RUS	Sergei Dobrin	863	2006/2007 season (70%)	98	227	134	142	0
66	SWE	Alexander Majorov	852	2008/2009 season (100%)	202	133	120	203	0
66	SWE	Alexander Majorov	852	2007/2008 season (100%)	0	97	97	0	0
66	SWE	Alexander Majorov	852	2006/2007 season (70%)	0	76	76	0	0
67	USA	Alexander Johnson	786	2008/2009 season (100%)	0	354	250	0	0
67	USA	Alexander Johnson	786	2007/2008 season (100%)	0	182	0	0	0
67	USA	Alexander Johnson	786	2006/2007 season (70%)	0	0	0	0	0
68	USA	Eliot Halverson	775	2008/2009 season (100%)	0	120	0	0	0
68	USA	Eliot Halverson	775	2007/2008 season (100%)	0	164	133	0	0
68	USA	Eliot Halverson	775	2006/2007 season (70%)	194	142	142	0	0
69	USA	Douglas Razzano	755	2008/2009 season (100%)	0	0	0	0	0
69	USA	Douglas Razzano	755	2007/2008 season (100%)	0	437	225	0	0
69	USA	Douglas Razzano	755	2006/2007 season (70%)	0	93	0	0	0
70	RUS	Konstantin Menshov	753	2008/2009 season (100%)	0	0	0	182	182
70	RUS	Konstantin Menshov	753	2007/2008 season (100%)	0	0	0	225	164
70	RUS	Konstantin Menshov	753	2006/2007 season (70%)	0	0	0	0	0
71	RUS	Vladimir Uspenski	723	2008/2009 season (100%)	0	0	0	0	0
71	RUS	Vladimir Uspenski	723	2007/2008 season (100%)	0	182	120	203	0
71	RUS	Vladimir Uspenski	723	2006/2007 season (70%)	0	142	76	0	0
72	RUS	Ivan Tretiakov	720	2008/2009 season (100%)	0	0	0	182	0
72	RUS	Ivan Tretiakov	720	2007/2008 season (100%)	0	120	0	164	0
72	RUS	Ivan Tretiakov	720	2006/2007 season (70%)	0	127	127	0	0
73	GER	Clemens Brummer	712	2008/2009 season (100%)	113	0	0	0	0
73	GER	Clemens Brummer	712	2007/2008 season (100%)	214	0	0	203	182
73	GER	Clemens Brummer	712	2006/2007 season (70%)	0	0	0	0	0
74	SUI	Moris Pfeifhofer	695	2008/2009 season (100%)	0	0	0	0	0
74	SUI	Moris Pfeifhofer	695	2007/2008 season (100%)	224	133	0	0	0
74	SUI	Moris Pfeifhofer	695	2006/2007 season (70%)	150	104	84	0	0
75	GER	Martin Liebers	692	2008/2009 season (100%)	0	0	0	182	164
75	GER	Martin Liebers	692	2007/2008 season (100%)	0	0	0	182	164
75	GER	Martin Liebers	692	2006/2007 season (70%)	0	0	0	142	0
75	KAZ	Abzal Rakimgaliev	692	2008/2009 season (100%)	214	133	0	0	0
75	KAZ	Abzal Rakimgaliev	692	2007/2008 season (100%)	237	108	0	0	0
75	KAZ	Abzal Rakimgaliev	692	2006/2007 season (70%)	0	0	0	0	0
77	CAN	Emanuel Sandhu	663	2008/2009 season (100%)	0	0	0	0	0
77	CAN	Emanuel Sandhu	663	2007/2008 season (100%)	0	0	0	0	0
77	CAN	Emanuel Sandhu	663	2006/2007 season (70%)	253	227	183	0	0
78	JPN	Akio Sasaki	650	2008/2009 season (100%)	0	203	133	0	0
78	JPN	Akio Sasaki	650	2007/2008 season (100%)	132	182	0	0	0
78	JPN	Akio Sasaki	650	2006/2007 season (70%)	0	0	0	0	0
79	POL	Przemyslaw Domanski	649	2008/2009 season (100%)	156	0	0	250	0
79	POL	Przemyslaw Domanski	649	2007/2008 season (100%)	0	0	0	164	0
79	POL	Przemyslaw Domanski	649	2006/2007 season (70%)	79	0	0	0	0
80	SVK	Peter Reitmayer	564	2008/2009 season (100%)	132	148	120	164	0
80	SVK	Peter Reitmayer	564	2007/2008 season (100%)	0	0	0	0	0
80	SVK	Peter Reitmayer	564	2006/2007 season (70%)	0	0	0	0	0
81	RUS	Stanislav Kovalev	561	2008/2009 season (100%)	147	182	164	0	0
81	RUS	Stanislav Kovalev	561	2007/2008 season (100%)	0	0	0	0	0
81	RUS	Stanislav Kovalev	561	2006/2007 season (70%)	0	68	0	0	0
82	CHN	Gongming Cheng	554	2008/2009 season (100%)	0	203	203	0	0
82	CHN	Gongming Cheng	554	2007/2008 season (100%)	0	148	0	0	0
82	CHN	Gongming Cheng	554	2006/2007 season (70%)	0	0	0	0	0
83	FRA	Christopher Boyadji	553	2008/2009 season (100%)	0	148	133	0	0
83	FRA	Christopher Boyadji	553	2007/2008 season (100%)	0	164	108	0	0
83	FRA	Christopher Boyadji	553	2006/2007 season (70%)	0	84	0	0	0
84	CHN	Ming Xu	521	2008/2009 season (100%)	0	0	0	0	0
84	CHN	Ming Xu	521	2007/2008 season (100%)	293	0	0	0	0
84	CHN	Ming Xu	521	2006/2007 season (70%)	228	0	0	0	0
85	UKR	Alexei Bychenko	512	2008/2009 season (100%)	0	0	0	225	0
85	UKR	Alexei Bychenko	512	2007/2008 season (100%)	0	0	0	203	0
85	UKR	Alexei Bychenko	512	2006/2007 season (70%)	0	84	0	0	0
86	RUS	Nikita Mikhailov	511	2008/2009 season (100%)	0	182	164	0	0
86	RUS	Nikita Mikhailov	511	2007/2008 season (100%)	97	0	0	0	0
86	RUS	Nikita Mikhailov	511	2006/2007 season (70%)	0	68	0	0	0
87	UKR	Anton Kovalevski	492	2008/2009 season (100%)	131	0	0	164	0
87	UKR	Anton Kovalevski	492	2007/2008 season (100%)	162	0	0	0	0
87	UKR	Anton Kovalevski	492	2006/2007 season (70%)	166	0	0	0	0
88	JPN	Daisuke Murakami	451	2008/2009 season (100%)	0	182	0	0	0
88	JPN	Daisuke Murakami	451	2007/2008 season (100%)	0	0	0	0	0
88	JPN	Daisuke Murakami	451	2006/2007 season (70%)	0	142	127	0	0
89	USA	Shaun Rogers	450	2008/2009 season (100%)	0	0	0	225	0
89	USA	Shaun Rogers	450	2007/2008 season (100%)	0	0	0	225	0
89	USA	Shaun Rogers	450	2006/2007 season (70%)	0	0	0	0	0
90	CAN	Ian Martinez	444	2008/2009 season (100%)	0	0	0	0	0
90	CAN	Ian Martinez	444	2007/2008 season (100%)	0	164	97	0	0
90	CAN	Ian Martinez	444	2006/2007 season (70%)	0	115	68	0	0
91	FIN	Ari-Pekka Nurmenkari	436	2008/2009 season (100%)	214	0	0	164	0
91	FIN	Ari-Pekka Nurmenkari	436	2007/2008 season (100%)	0	0	0	0	0
91	FIN	Ari-Pekka Nurmenkari	436	2006/2007 season (70%)	58	0	0	0	0
92	RUS	Ilia Klimkin	431	2008/2009 season (100%)	0	0	0	0	0
92	RUS	Ilia Klimkin	431	2007/2008 season (100%)	0	0	0	0	0
92	RUS	Ilia Klimkin	431	2006/2007 season (70%)	0	227	204	0	0
93	USA	Keegan Messing	407	2008/2009 season (100%)	0	225	182	0	0
93	USA	Keegan Messing	407	2007/2008 season (100%)	0	0	0	0	0
93	USA	Keegan Messing	407	2006/2007 season (70%)	0	0	0	0	0
94	BRA	Kevin Alves	396	2008/2009 season (100%)	173	97	0	0	0
94	BRA	Kevin Alves	396	2007/2008 season (100%)	126	0	0	0	0
94	BRA	Kevin Alves	396	2006/2007 season (70%)	0	0	0	0	0
95	JPN	Yuzuru Hanyu	388	2008/2009 season (100%)	224	164	0	0	0
95	JPN	Yuzuru Hanyu	388	2007/2008 season (100%)	0	0	0	0	0
95	JPN	Yuzuru Hanyu	388	2006/2007 season (70%)	0	0	0	0	0
96	USA	Parker Pennington	383	2008/2009 season (100%)	0	0	0	0	0
96	USA	Parker Pennington	383	2007/2008 season (100%)	0	0	0	225	0
96	USA	Parker Pennington	383	2006/2007 season (70%)	0	0	0	158	0
97	USA	Scott Smith	369	2008/2009 season (100%)	0	0	0	0	0
97	USA	Scott Smith	369	2007/2008 season (100%)	0	0	0	0	0
97	USA	Scott Smith	369	2006/2007 season (70%)	0	204	165	0	0
98	GER	Denis Wieczorek	368	2008/2009 season (100%)	182	108	0	0	0
98	GER	Denis Wieczorek	368	2007/2008 season (100%)	78	0	0	0	0
98	GER	Denis Wieczorek	368	2006/2007 season (70%)	0	0	0	0	0
99	RUS	Alexander Nikolaev	351	2008/2009 season (100%)	0	203	148	0	0
99	RUS	Alexander Nikolaev	351	2007/2008 season (100%)	0	0	0	0	0
99	RUS	Alexander Nikolaev	351	2006/2007 season (70%)	0	0	0	0	0
100	ITA	Ruben Errampalli	348	2008/2009 season (100%)	87	97	0	0	0
100	ITA	Ruben Errampalli	348	2007/2008 season (100%)	0	0	0	164	0
100	ITA	Ruben Errampalli	348	2006/2007 season (70%)	0	0	0	0	0
100	MEX	Luis Hernandez	348	2008/2009 season (100%)	156	0	0	0	0
100	MEX	Luis Hernandez	348	2007/2008 season (100%)	192	0	0	0	0
100	MEX	Luis Hernandez	348	2006/2007 season (70%)	109	0	0	0	0
100	CAN	Andrei Rogozine	348	2008/2009 season (100%)	0	120	108	0	0
100	CAN	Andrei Rogozine	348	2007/2008 season (100%)	0	120	0	0	0
100	CAN	Andrei Rogozine	348	2006/2007 season (70%)	0	0	0	0	0
100	NZL	Tristan Thode	348	2008/2009 season (100%)	0	0	0	0	0
100	NZL	Tristan Thode	348	2007/2008 season (100%)	214	0	0	0	0
100	NZL	Tristan Thode	348	2006/2007 season (70%)	134	0	0	0	0
104	USA	Nicholas Laroche	340	2008/2009 season (100%)	0	0	0	0	0
104	USA	Nicholas Laroche	340	2007/2008 season (100%)	0	0	0	225	0
104	USA	Nicholas Laroche	340	2006/2007 season (70%)	0	0	0	115	0
105	FRA	Chafik Besseghier	330	2008/2009 season (100%)	0	148	0	182	0
105	FRA	Chafik Besseghier	330	2007/2008 season (100%)	0	0	0	0	0
105	FRA	Chafik Besseghier	330	2006/2007 season (70%)	0	0	0	0	0
105	USA	Andrew Gonzales	330	2008/2009 season (100%)	0	182	148	0	0
105	USA	Andrew Gonzales	330	2007/2008 season (100%)	0	0	0	0	0
105	USA	Andrew Gonzales	330	2006/2007 season (70%)	0	0	0	0	0
107	CRO	Boris Martinec	329	2008/2009 season (100%)	83	0	0	0	0
107	CRO	Boris Martinec	329	2007/2008 season (100%)	0	0	0	182	0
107	CRO	Boris Martinec	329	2006/2007 season (70%)	64	0	0	0	0
108	GER	Philipp Tischendorf	309	2008/2009 season (100%)	0	0	0	0	0
108	GER	Philipp Tischendorf	309	2007/2008 season (100%)	0	0	0	0	0
108	GER	Philipp Tischendorf	309	2006/2007 season (70%)	141	84	84	0	0
109	POL	Konstantin Tupikov	305	2008/2009 season (100%)	0	0	0	203	0
109	POL	Konstantin Tupikov	305	2007/2008 season (100%)	102	0	0	0	0
109	POL	Konstantin Tupikov	305	2006/2007 season (70%)	0	0	0	0	0
110	CAN	Joey Russell	301	2008/2009 season (100%)	0	0	0	0	0
110	CAN	Joey Russell	301	2007/2008 season (100%)	0	0	0	0	0
110	CAN	Joey Russell	301	2006/2007 season (70%)	174	127	0	0	0
110	JPN	Hirofumi Torii	301	2008/2009 season (100%)	0	0	0	0	0
110	JPN	Hirofumi Torii	301	2007/2008 season (100%)	0	0	0	0	0
110	JPN	Hirofumi Torii	301	2006/2007 season (70%)	55	142	104	0	0
112	UKR	Vitali Sazonets	295	2008/2009 season (100%)	0	0	0	182	0
112	UKR	Vitali Sazonets	295	2007/2008 season (100%)	113	0	0	0	0
112	UKR	Vitali Sazonets	295	2006/2007 season (70%)	0	0	0	0	0
113	NZL	Joel Watson	290	2008/2009 season (100%)	0	0	0	0	0
113	NZL	Joel Watson	290	2007/2008 season (100%)	140	0	0	0	0
113	NZL	Joel Watson	290	2006/2007 season (70%)	150	0	0	0	0
114	RSA	Justin Pietersen	286	2008/2009 season (100%)	113	0	0	0	0
114	RSA	Justin Pietersen	286	2007/2008 season (100%)	173	0	0	0	0
114	RSA	Justin Pietersen	286	2006/2007 season (70%)	88	0	0	0	0
115	RUS	Denis Leushin	285	2008/2009 season (100%)	0	0	0	0	0
115	RUS	Denis Leushin	285	2007/2008 season (100%)	0	0	0	0	0
115	RUS	Denis Leushin	285	2006/2007 season (70%)	0	0	0	158	127
116	AUS	Nicholas Fernandez	277	2008/2009 season (100%)	102	0	0	0	0
116	AUS	Nicholas Fernandez	277	2007/2008 season (100%)	156	0	0	0	0
116	AUS	Nicholas Fernandez	277	2006/2007 season (70%)	121	0	0	0	0
116	USA	Ross Miner	277	2008/2009 season (100%)	277	0	0	0	0
116	USA	Ross Miner	277	2007/2008 season (100%)	0	0	0	0	0
116	USA	Ross Miner	277	2006/2007 season (70%)	0	0	0	0	0
118	GER	Stefan Lindemann	264	2008/2009 season (100%)	0	0	0	0	0
118	GER	Stefan Lindemann	264	2007/2008 season (100%)	0	0	0	0	0
118	GER	Stefan Lindemann	264	2006/2007 season (70%)	264	0	0	0	0
119	SVK	Jakub Strobl	256	2008/2009 season (100%)	0	0	0	0	0
119	SVK	Jakub Strobl	256	2007/2008 season (100%)	70	0	0	0	0
119	SVK	Jakub Strobl	256	2006/2007 season (70%)	0	93	93	0	0
120	GER	Christopher Berneck	253	2008/2009 season (100%)	0	0	0	0	0
120	GER	Christopher Berneck	253	2007/2008 season (100%)	0	133	120	0	0
120	GER	Christopher Berneck	253	2006/2007 season (70%)	0	0	0	0	0
120	AUS	Robert McNamara	253	2008/2009 season (100%)	140	0	0	0	0
120	AUS	Robert McNamara	253	2007/2008 season (100%)	113	0	0	0	0
120	AUS	Robert McNamara	253	2006/2007 season (70%)	0	0	0	0	0
122	FRA	Yoann Deslot	250	2008/2009 season (100%)	0	0	0	0	0
122	FRA	Yoann Deslot	250	2007/2008 season (100%)	0	0	0	250	0
122	FRA	Yoann Deslot	250	2006/2007 season (70%)	0	0	0	0	0
123	RUS	Daniil Gleichengauz	239	2008/2009 season (100%)	0	0	0	0	0
123	RUS	Daniil Gleichengauz	239	2007/2008 season (100%)	0	164	0	0	0
123	RUS	Daniil Gleichengauz	239	2006/2007 season (70%)	75	0	0	0	0
124	CHN	Song Gao	237	2008/2009 season (100%)	237	0	0	0	0
124	CHN	Song Gao	237	2007/2008 season (100%)	0	0	0	0	0
124	CHN	Song Gao	237	2006/2007 season (70%)	0	0	0	0	0
125	KOR	Min-Seok Kim	234	2008/2009 season (100%)	126	108	0	0	0
125	KOR	Min-Seok Kim	234	2007/2008 season (100%)	0	0	0	0	0
125	KOR	Min-Seok Kim	234	2006/2007 season (70%)	0	0	0	0	0
126	POL	Sebastian Iwasaki	228	2008/2009 season (100%)	0	120	108	0	0
126	POL	Sebastian Iwasaki	228	2007/2008 season (100%)	0	0	0	0	0
126	POL	Sebastian Iwasaki	228	2006/2007 season (70%)	0	0	0	0	0
127	ESP	Javier Raya	227	2008/2009 season (100%)	107	120	0	0	0
127	ESP	Javier Raya	227	2007/2008 season (100%)	0	0	0	0	0
127	ESP	Javier Raya	227	2006/2007 season (70%)	0	0	0	0	0
128	CAN	Samuel Morais	217	2008/2009 season (100%)	0	120	97	0	0
128	CAN	Samuel Morais	217	2007/2008 season (100%)	0	0	0	0	0
128	CAN	Samuel Morais	217	2006/2007 season (70%)	0	0	0	0	0
128	JPN	Yukihiro Yoshida	217	2008/2009 season (100%)	0	133	0	0	0
128	JPN	Yukihiro Yoshida	217	2007/2008 season (100%)	0	0	0	0	0
128	JPN	Yukihiro Yoshida	217	2006/2007 season (70%)	0	84	0	0	0
130	CAN	Patrick Wong	212	2008/2009 season (100%)	0	108	0	0	0
130	CAN	Patrick Wong	212	2007/2008 season (100%)	0	0	0	0	0
130	CAN	Patrick Wong	212	2006/2007 season (70%)	0	104	0	0	0
131	FRA	Romain Ponsart	205	2008/2009 season (100%)	0	0	0	0	0
131	FRA	Romain Ponsart	205	2007/2008 season (100%)	0	108	97	0	0
131	FRA	Romain Ponsart	205	2006/2007 season (70%)	0	0	0	0	0
131	CHN	Zhixue Yang	205	2008/2009 season (100%)	0	0	0	0	0
131	CHN	Zhixue Yang	205	2007/2008 season (100%)	0	0	0	0	0
131	CHN	Zhixue Yang	205	2006/2007 season (70%)	205	0	0	0	0
133	FRA	Jeremie Colot	203	2008/2009 season (100%)	0	0	0	0	0
133	FRA	Jeremie Colot	203	2007/2008 season (100%)	0	0	0	203	0
133	FRA	Jeremie Colot	203	2006/2007 season (70%)	0	0	0	0	0
133	AUT	Severin Kiefer	203	2008/2009 season (100%)	0	0	0	0	0
133	AUT	Severin Kiefer	203	2007/2008 season (100%)	0	0	0	203	0
133	AUT	Severin Kiefer	203	2006/2007 season (70%)	0	0	0	0	0
135	CAN	Andrew Lum	201	2008/2009 season (100%)	0	0	0	0	0
135	CAN	Andrew Lum	201	2007/2008 season (100%)	0	133	0	0	0
135	CAN	Andrew Lum	201	2006/2007 season (70%)	0	68	0	0	0
136	GBR	John Hamer	198	2008/2009 season (100%)	0	0	0	0	0
136	GBR	John Hamer	198	2007/2008 season (100%)	0	0	0	0	0
136	GBR	John Hamer	198	2006/2007 season (70%)	71	0	0	127	0
137	RUS	Gordei Gorshkov	196	2008/2009 season (100%)	0	0	0	0	0
137	RUS	Gordei Gorshkov	196	2007/2008 season (100%)	0	120	0	0	0
137	RUS	Gordei Gorshkov	196	2006/2007 season (70%)	0	76	0	0	0
138	AUS	Mark Webster	192	2008/2009 season (100%)	192	0	0	0	0
138	AUS	Mark Webster	192	2007/2008 season (100%)	0	0	0	0	0
138	AUS	Mark Webster	192	2006/2007 season (70%)	0	0	0	0	0
139	MEX	Humberto Contreras	185	2008/2009 season (100%)	83	0	0	0	0
139	MEX	Humberto Contreras	185	2007/2008 season (100%)	102	0	0	0	0
139	MEX	Humberto Contreras	185	2006/2007 season (70%)	0	0	0	0	0
140	RUS	Ilia Gurilev	182	2008/2009 season (100%)	0	0	0	0	0
140	RUS	Ilia Gurilev	182	2007/2008 season (100%)	0	182	0	0	0
140	RUS	Ilia Gurilev	182	2006/2007 season (70%)	0	0	0	0	0
140	GBR	Elliot Hilton	182	2008/2009 season (100%)	74	0	0	0	0
140	GBR	Elliot Hilton	182	2007/2008 season (100%)	0	108	0	0	0
140	GBR	Elliot Hilton	182	2006/2007 season (70%)	0	0	0	0	0
140	FRA	Jeremy Prevoteaux	182	2008/2009 season (100%)	0	0	0	0	0
140	FRA	Jeremy Prevoteaux	182	2007/2008 season (100%)	0	0	0	182	0
140	FRA	Jeremy Prevoteaux	182	2006/2007 season (70%)	0	0	0	0	0
143	EST	Viktor Romanenkov	178	2008/2009 season (100%)	70	108	0	0	0
143	EST	Viktor Romanenkov	178	2007/2008 season (100%)	0	0	0	0	0
143	EST	Viktor Romanenkov	178	2006/2007 season (70%)	0	0	0	0	0
144	CAN	Kevin Darwish	177	2008/2009 season (100%)	0	0	0	0	0
144	CAN	Kevin Darwish	177	2007/2008 season (100%)	0	0	0	0	0
144	CAN	Kevin Darwish	177	2006/2007 season (70%)	0	93	84	0	0
145	ITA	Marco Fabbri	167	2008/2009 season (100%)	0	0	0	0	0
145	ITA	Marco Fabbri	167	2007/2008 season (100%)	0	0	0	0	0
145	ITA	Marco Fabbri	167	2006/2007 season (70%)	83	84	0	0	0
146	AUS	Sean Carlow	166	2008/2009 season (100%)	0	0	0	0	0
146	AUS	Sean Carlow	166	2007/2008 season (100%)	0	0	0	0	0
146	AUS	Sean Carlow	166	2006/2007 season (70%)	166	0	0	0	0
147	GBR	Thomas Paulson	164	2008/2009 season (100%)	0	0	0	164	0
147	GBR	Thomas Paulson	164	2007/2008 season (100%)	0	0	0	0	0
147	GBR	Thomas Paulson	164	2006/2007 season (70%)	0	0	0	0	0
147	AUT	Viktor Pfeifer	164	2008/2009 season (100%)	0	0	0	164	0
147	AUT	Viktor Pfeifer	164	2007/2008 season (100%)	0	0	0	0	0
147	AUT	Viktor Pfeifer	164	2006/2007 season (70%)	0	0	0	0	0
147	JPN	Ryo Shibata	164	2008/2009 season (100%)	0	0	0	0	0
147	JPN	Ryo Shibata	164	2007/2008 season (100%)	0	0	0	164	0
147	JPN	Ryo Shibata	164	2006/2007 season (70%)	0	0	0	0	0
150	CAN	Ronald Lam	148	2008/2009 season (100%)	0	148	0	0	0
150	CAN	Ronald Lam	148	2007/2008 season (100%)	0	0	0	0	0
150	CAN	Ronald Lam	148	2006/2007 season (70%)	0	0	0	0	0
151	BLR	Alexandr Kazakov	140	2008/2009 season (100%)	0	0	0	0	0
151	BLR	Alexandr Kazakov	140	2007/2008 season (100%)	140	0	0	0	0
151	BLR	Alexandr Kazakov	140	2006/2007 season (70%)	0	0	0	0	0
152	CAN	Marc Andre Craig	134	2008/2009 season (100%)	0	0	0	0	0
152	CAN	Marc Andre Craig	134	2007/2008 season (100%)	0	0	0	0	0
152	CAN	Marc Andre Craig	134	2006/2007 season (70%)	0	134	0	0	0
153	USA	William Brewster	133	2008/2009 season (100%)	0	133	0	0	0
153	USA	William Brewster	133	2007/2008 season (100%)	0	0	0	0	0
153	USA	William Brewster	133	2006/2007 season (70%)	0	0	0	0	0
153	CAN	Dave Ferland	133	2008/2009 season (100%)	0	0	0	0	0
153	CAN	Dave Ferland	133	2007/2008 season (100%)	0	133	0	0	0
153	CAN	Dave Ferland	133	2006/2007 season (70%)	0	0	0	0	0
153	FIN	Bela Papp	133	2008/2009 season (100%)	0	133	0	0	0
153	FIN	Bela Papp	133	2007/2008 season (100%)	0	0	0	0	0
153	FIN	Bela Papp	133	2006/2007 season (70%)	0	0	0	0	0
153	SUI	Stephane Walker	133	2008/2009 season (100%)	0	133	0	0	0
153	SUI	Stephane Walker	133	2007/2008 season (100%)	0	0	0	0	0
153	SUI	Stephane Walker	133	2006/2007 season (70%)	0	0	0	0	0
157	POL	Maciej Cieplucha	131	2008/2009 season (100%)	0	0	0	0	0
157	POL	Maciej Cieplucha	131	2007/2008 season (100%)	63	0	0	0	0
157	POL	Maciej Cieplucha	131	2006/2007 season (70%)	68	0	0	0	0
158	AUT	Manuel Koll	127	2008/2009 season (100%)	0	0	0	0	0
158	AUT	Manuel Koll	127	2007/2008 season (100%)	83	0	0	0	0
158	AUT	Manuel Koll	127	2006/2007 season (70%)	44	0	0	0	0
159	CAN	Jean-Simon Legare	120	2008/2009 season (100%)	0	0	0	0	0
159	CAN	Jean-Simon Legare	120	2007/2008 season (100%)	0	120	0	0	0
159	CAN	Jean-Simon Legare	120	2006/2007 season (70%)	0	0	0	0	0
160	CZE	Petr Bidar	108	2008/2009 season (100%)	0	0	0	0	0
160	CZE	Petr Bidar	108	2007/2008 season (100%)	0	108	0	0	0
160	CZE	Petr Bidar	108	2006/2007 season (70%)	0	0	0	0	0
160	RUS	Jean Bush	108	2008/2009 season (100%)	0	108	0	0	0
160	RUS	Jean Bush	108	2007/2008 season (100%)	0	0	0	0	0
160	RUS	Jean Bush	108	2006/2007 season (70%)	0	0	0	0	0
160	FRA	Morgan Ciprès	108	2008/2009 season (100%)	0	108	0	0	0
160	FRA	Morgan Ciprès	108	2007/2008 season (100%)	0	0	0	0	0
160	FRA	Morgan Ciprès	108	2006/2007 season (70%)	0	0	0	0	0
160	JPN	Takuya Kondoh	108	2008/2009 season (100%)	0	0	0	0	0
160	JPN	Takuya Kondoh	108	2007/2008 season (100%)	0	108	0	0	0
160	JPN	Takuya Kondoh	108	2006/2007 season (70%)	0	0	0	0	0
164	GER	Norman Keck	104	2008/2009 season (100%)	0	0	0	0	0
164	GER	Norman Keck	104	2007/2008 season (100%)	0	0	0	0	0
164	GER	Norman Keck	104	2006/2007 season (70%)	0	104	0	0	0
165	NZL	Mathieu Wilson	98	2008/2009 season (100%)	0	0	0	0	0
165	NZL	Mathieu Wilson	98	2007/2008 season (100%)	0	0	0	0	0
165	NZL	Mathieu Wilson	98	2006/2007 season (70%)	98	0	0	0	0
166	BEL	Ruben Blommaert	97	2008/2009 season (100%)	0	97	0	0	0
166	BEL	Ruben Blommaert	97	2007/2008 season (100%)	0	0	0	0	0
166	BEL	Ruben Blommaert	97	2006/2007 season (70%)	0	0	0	0	0
166	CZE	Petr Coufal	97	2008/2009 season (100%)	97	0	0	0	0
166	CZE	Petr Coufal	97	2007/2008 season (100%)	0	0	0	0	0
166	CZE	Petr Coufal	97	2006/2007 season (70%)	0	0	0	0	0
166	SUI	Timothy Leemann	97	2008/2009 season (100%)	0	97	0	0	0
166	SUI	Timothy Leemann	97	2007/2008 season (100%)	0	0	0	0	0
166	SUI	Timothy Leemann	97	2006/2007 season (70%)	0	0	0	0	0
166	JPN	Kento Nakamura	97	2008/2009 season (100%)	0	0	0	0	0
166	JPN	Kento Nakamura	97	2007/2008 season (100%)	0	97	0	0	0
166	JPN	Kento Nakamura	97	2006/2007 season (70%)	0	0	0	0	0
166	CAN	Paul Poirier	97	2008/2009 season (100%)	0	97	0	0	0
166	CAN	Paul Poirier	97	2007/2008 season (100%)	0	0	0	0	0
166	CAN	Paul Poirier	97	2006/2007 season (70%)	0	0	0	0	0
166	SUI	Tomi Pulkkinen	97	2008/2009 season (100%)	0	97	0	0	0
166	SUI	Tomi Pulkkinen	97	2007/2008 season (100%)	0	0	0	0	0
166	SUI	Tomi Pulkkinen	97	2006/2007 season (70%)	0	0	0	0	0
166	GER	Franz Streubel	97	2008/2009 season (100%)	0	0	0	0	0
166	GER	Franz Streubel	97	2007/2008 season (100%)	0	97	0	0	0
166	GER	Franz Streubel	97	2006/2007 season (70%)	0	0	0	0	0
173	ESP	Manuel Legaz	93	2008/2009 season (100%)	0	0	0	0	0
173	ESP	Manuel Legaz	93	2007/2008 season (100%)	0	0	0	0	0
173	ESP	Manuel Legaz	93	2006/2007 season (70%)	0	93	0	0	0
174	TPE	Charles Shou-San Pao	92	2008/2009 season (100%)	92	0	0	0	0
174	TPE	Charles Shou-San Pao	92	2007/2008 season (100%)	0	0	0	0	0
174	TPE	Charles Shou-San Pao	92	2006/2007 season (70%)	0	0	0	0	0
175	AUS	Dean Timmins	79	2008/2009 season (100%)	0	0	0	0	0
175	AUS	Dean Timmins	79	2007/2008 season (100%)	0	0	0	0	0
175	AUS	Dean Timmins	79	2006/2007 season (70%)	79	0	0	0	0
176	FRA	Bruno Massot	76	2008/2009 season (100%)	0	0	0	0	0
176	FRA	Bruno Massot	76	2007/2008 season (100%)	0	0	0	0	0
176	FRA	Bruno Massot	76	2006/2007 season (70%)	0	76	0	0	0
176	AZE	Danil Privalov	76	2008/2009 season (100%)	0	0	0	0	0
176	AZE	Danil Privalov	76	2007/2008 season (100%)	0	0	0	0	0
176	AZE	Danil Privalov	76	2006/2007 season (70%)	0	76	0	0	0
178	CRO	Josip Gluhak	74	2008/2009 season (100%)	0	0	0	0	0
178	CRO	Josip Gluhak	74	2007/2008 season (100%)	74	0	0	0	0
178	CRO	Josip Gluhak	74	2006/2007 season (70%)	0	0	0	0	0
178	TPE	Wun-Chang Shih	74	2008/2009 season (100%)	74	0	0	0	0
178	TPE	Wun-Chang Shih	74	2007/2008 season (100%)	0	0	0	0	0
178	TPE	Wun-Chang Shih	74	2006/2007 season (70%)	0	0	0	0	0
180	MEX	Adrian Alvarado	71	2008/2009 season (100%)	0	0	0	0	0
180	MEX	Adrian Alvarado	71	2007/2008 season (100%)	0	0	0	0	0
180	MEX	Adrian Alvarado	71	2006/2007 season (70%)	71	0	0	0	0
181	GER	Marcel Kotzian	68	2008/2009 season (100%)	0	0	0	0	0
181	GER	Marcel Kotzian	68	2007/2008 season (100%)	0	0	0	0	0
181	GER	Marcel Kotzian	68	2006/2007 season (70%)	0	68	0	0	0
181	POL	Edwin Siwkowski	68	2008/2009 season (100%)	0	0	0	0	0
181	POL	Edwin Siwkowski	68	2007/2008 season (100%)	0	0	0	0	0
181	POL	Edwin Siwkowski	68	2006/2007 season (70%)	0	68	0	0	0
183	AUS	Matthew Precious	63	2008/2009 season (100%)	63	0	0	0	0
183	AUS	Matthew Precious	63	2007/2008 season (100%)	0	0	0	0	0
183	AUS	Matthew Precious	63	2006/2007 season (70%)	0	0	0	0	0
184	ISR	Sergei Kotov	52	2008/2009 season (100%)	0	0	0	0	0
184	ISR	Sergei Kotov	52	2007/2008 season (100%)	0	0	0	0	0
184	ISR	Sergei Kotov	52	2006/2007 season (70%)	52	0	0	0	0
185	NOR	Michael Chrolenko	49	2008/2009 season (100%)	0	0	0	0	0
185	NOR	Michael Chrolenko	49	2007/2008 season (100%)	0	0	0	0	0
185	NOR	Michael Chrolenko	49	2006/2007 season (70%)	49	0	0	0	0

==== Ladies' singles (211 skaters) ====
As of 29 March 2009

Rank	Nation	Skater	Points	Season	ISU Championships or Olympics	(Junior) Grand Prix and Final		Selected International Competition	
Rank	Nation	Skater	Points	Season	Best	Best	2nd Best	Best	2nd Best
1	KOR	Yuna Kim	4652	2008/2009 season (100%)	1200	720	400	0	0
1	KOR	Yuna Kim	4652	2007/2008 season (100%)	972	800	400	0	0
1	KOR	Yuna Kim	4652	2006/2007 season (70%)	680	560	280	0	0
2	ITA	Carolina Kostner	4635	2008/2009 season (100%)	756	648	400	250	0
2	ITA	Carolina Kostner	4635	2007/2008 season (100%)	1080	648	400	250	203
2	ITA	Carolina Kostner	4635	2006/2007 season (70%)	588	0	0	0	0
3	JPN	Mao Asada	4499	2008/2009 season (100%)	875	800	400	0	0
3	JPN	Mao Asada	4499	2007/2008 season (100%)	1200	720	400	0	0
3	JPN	Mao Asada	4499	2006/2007 season (70%)	756	504	280	0	0
4	CAN	Joannie Rochette	3498	2008/2009 season (100%)	1080	583	400	0	0
4	CAN	Joannie Rochette	3498	2007/2008 season (100%)	787	324	324	0	0
4	CAN	Joannie Rochette	3498	2006/2007 season (70%)	476	280	204	0	0
5	FIN	Laura Lepistö	3416	2008/2009 season (100%)	840	324	262	225	225
5	FIN	Laura Lepistö	3416	2007/2008 season (100%)	680	262	213	203	182
5	FIN	Laura Lepistö	3416	2006/2007 season (70%)	266	115	0	0	0
6	JPN	Miki Ando	3372	2008/2009 season (100%)	972	472	360	0	0
6	JPN	Miki Ando	3372	2007/2008 season (100%)	680	360	292	0	0
6	JPN	Miki Ando	3372	2006/2007 season (70%)	840	368	280	0	0
7	JPN	Yukari Nakano	3196	2008/2009 season (100%)	0	525	360	0	0
7	JPN	Yukari Nakano	3196	2007/2008 season (100%)	875	525	360	0	0
7	JPN	Yukari Nakano	3196	2006/2007 season (70%)	551	252	227	0	0
8	USA	Caroline Zhang	2975	2008/2009 season (100%)	644	324	262	0	0
8	USA	Caroline Zhang	2975	2007/2008 season (100%)	644	583	360	0	0
8	USA	Caroline Zhang	2975	2006/2007 season (70%)	501	420	175	0	0
9	USA	Rachael Flatt	2944	2008/2009 season (100%)	787	360	292	0	0
9	USA	Rachael Flatt	2944	2007/2008 season (100%)	715	540	250	0	0
9	USA	Rachael Flatt	2944	2006/2007 season (70%)	0	0	0	0	0
10	HUN	Júlia Sebestyén	2905	2008/2009 season (100%)	402	213	0	250	0
10	HUN	Júlia Sebestyén	2905	2007/2008 season (100%)	612	262	213	250	164
10	HUN	Júlia Sebestyén	2905	2006/2007 season (70%)	264	330	280	142	0
11	SUI	Sarah Meier	2874	2008/2009 season (100%)	517	236	0	203	0
11	SUI	Sarah Meier	2874	2007/2008 season (100%)	756	360	292	0	0
11	SUI	Sarah Meier	2874	2006/2007 season (70%)	529	454	280	0	0
12	USA	Kimmie Meissner	2602	2008/2009 season (100%)	0	191	191	0	0
12	USA	Kimmie Meissner	2602	2007/2008 season (100%)	638	472	400	0	0
12	USA	Kimmie Meissner	2602	2006/2007 season (70%)	613	252	227	0	0
13	FIN	Susanna Pã–Ykiã–	2527	2008/2009 season (100%)	680	262	236	164	0
13	FIN	Susanna Pã–Ykiã–	2527	2007/2008 season (100%)	0	191	0	225	0
13	FIN	Susanna Pã–Ykiã–	2527	2006/2007 season (70%)	428	183	183	158	0
14	USA	Mirai Nagasu	2333	2008/2009 season (100%)	0	262	191	0	0
14	USA	Mirai Nagasu	2333	2007/2008 season (100%)	579	600	250	0	0
14	USA	Mirai Nagasu	2333	2006/2007 season (70%)	451	0	0	0	0
15	JPN	Fumie Suguri	2283	2008/2009 season (100%)	574	360	324	0	0
15	JPN	Fumie Suguri	2283	2007/2008 season (100%)	325	292	262	0	0
15	JPN	Fumie Suguri	2283	2006/2007 season (70%)	0	408	252	0	0
16	FIN	Kiira Korpi	2272	2008/2009 season (100%)	551	0	0	0	0
16	FIN	Kiira Korpi	2272	2007/2008 season (100%)	551	292	0	225	164
16	FIN	Kiira Korpi	2272	2006/2007 season (70%)	476	165	149	175	0
17	USA	Ashley Wagner	2270	2008/2009 season (100%)	579	292	292	0	0
17	USA	Ashley Wagner	2270	2007/2008 season (100%)	402	324	262	0	0
17	USA	Ashley Wagner	2270	2006/2007 season (70%)	405	378	175	0	0
18	RUS	Alena Leonova	2226	2008/2009 season (100%)	715	262	213	225	0
18	RUS	Alena Leonova	2226	2007/2008 season (100%)	422	225	164	0	0
18	RUS	Alena Leonova	2226	2006/2007 season (70%)	157	0	0	0	0
19	GEO	Elene Gedevanishvili	2158	2008/2009 season (100%)	465	213	0	250	182
19	GEO	Elene Gedevanishvili	2158	2007/2008 season (100%)	446	236	191	0	0
19	GEO	Elene Gedevanishvili	2158	2006/2007 season (70%)	281	0	0	175	0
20	USA	Alissa Czisny	2110	2008/2009 season (100%)	418	324	292	250	0
20	USA	Alissa Czisny	2110	2007/2008 season (100%)	0	236	0	0	0
20	USA	Alissa Czisny	2110	2006/2007 season (70%)	386	204	0	0	0
21	FIN	Jenni Vã„Hã„Maa	1938	2008/2009 season (100%)	0	0	0	0	0
21	FIN	Jenni Vã„Hã„Maa	1938	2007/2008 season (100%)	521	394	225	250	0
21	FIN	Jenni Vã„Hã„Maa	1938	2006/2007 season (70%)	365	115	68	0	0
22	EST	Elena Glebova	1897	2008/2009 season (100%)	264	236	0	225	182
22	EST	Elena Glebova	1897	2007/2008 season (100%)	275	236	191	0	0
22	EST	Elena Glebova	1897	2006/2007 season (70%)	295	142	104	115	0
23	SWE	Joshi Helgesson	1873	2008/2009 season (100%)	521	133	108	225	225
23	SWE	Joshi Helgesson	1873	2007/2008 season (100%)	380	148	133	0	0
23	SWE	Joshi Helgesson	1873	2006/2007 season (70%)	0	76	0	0	0
24	SVK	Ivana Reitmayerova	1723	2008/2009 season (100%)	342	148	108	250	225
24	SVK	Ivana Reitmayerova	1723	2007/2008 season (100%)	164	97	0	225	164
24	SVK	Ivana Reitmayerova	1723	2006/2007 season (70%)	0	0	0	0	0
25	JPN	Akiko Suzuki	1715	2008/2009 season (100%)	402	360	0	250	203
25	JPN	Akiko Suzuki	1715	2007/2008 season (100%)	0	0	0	250	250
25	JPN	Akiko Suzuki	1715	2006/2007 season (70%)	0	0	0	0	0
26	ITA	Stefania Berton	1675	2008/2009 season (100%)	173	203	182	250	203
26	ITA	Stefania Berton	1675	2007/2008 season (100%)	237	148	133	0	0
26	ITA	Stefania Berton	1675	2006/2007 season (70%)	194	248	158	0	0
27	ITA	Valentina Marchei	1674	2008/2009 season (100%)	0	0	0	250	0
27	ITA	Valentina Marchei	1674	2007/2008 season (100%)	496	0	0	250	0
27	ITA	Valentina Marchei	1674	2006/2007 season (70%)	386	165	0	127	0
28	USA	Beatrisa Liang	1578	2008/2009 season (100%)	0	262	236	0	0
28	USA	Beatrisa Liang	1578	2007/2008 season (100%)	465	236	191	0	0
28	USA	Beatrisa Liang	1578	2006/2007 season (70%)	0	204	183	175	0
29	GBR	Jenna McCorkell	1565	2008/2009 season (100%)	362	213	0	203	182
29	GBR	Jenna McCorkell	1565	2007/2008 season (100%)	402	0	0	203	0
29	GBR	Jenna McCorkell	1565	2006/2007 season (70%)	134	0	0	0	0
30	GER	Sarah Hecken	1542	2008/2009 season (100%)	380	203	164	203	0
30	GER	Sarah Hecken	1542	2007/2008 season (100%)	342	250	0	0	0
30	GER	Sarah Hecken	1542	2006/2007 season (70%)	0	0	0	0	0
31	CAN	Mira Leung	1527	2008/2009 season (100%)	0	213	0	0	0
31	CAN	Mira Leung	1527	2007/2008 season (100%)	551	262	262	0	0
31	CAN	Mira Leung	1527	2006/2007 season (70%)	74	165	134	0	0
32	USA	Emily Hughes	1523	2008/2009 season (100%)	0	0	0	0	0
32	USA	Emily Hughes	1523	2007/2008 season (100%)	0	292	292	0	0
32	USA	Emily Hughes	1523	2006/2007 season (70%)	529	227	183	0	0
33	USA	Katrina Hacker	1507	2008/2009 season (100%)	469	236	191	0	0
33	USA	Katrina Hacker	1507	2007/2008 season (100%)	496	0	0	0	0
33	USA	Katrina Hacker	1507	2006/2007 season (70%)	0	115	0	0	0
34	CAN	Cynthia Phaneuf	1401	2008/2009 season (100%)	551	213	191	0	0
34	CAN	Cynthia Phaneuf	1401	2007/2008 season (100%)	446	0	0	0	0
34	CAN	Cynthia Phaneuf	1401	2006/2007 season (70%)	134	0	0	0	0
35	SWE	Viktoria Helgesson	1378	2008/2009 season (100%)	156	0	0	250	164
35	SWE	Viktoria Helgesson	1378	2007/2008 season (100%)	200	182	120	164	0
35	SWE	Viktoria Helgesson	1378	2006/2007 season (70%)	0	0	0	142	0
36	USA	Alexe Gilles	1315	2008/2009 season (100%)	0	486	250	0	0
36	USA	Alexe Gilles	1315	2007/2008 season (100%)	0	354	225	0	0
36	USA	Alexe Gilles	1315	2006/2007 season (70%)	0	0	0	0	0
37	JPN	Rumi Suizu	1307	2008/2009 season (100%)	0	225	97	0	0
37	JPN	Rumi Suizu	1307	2007/2008 season (100%)	147	203	203	0	0
37	JPN	Rumi Suizu	1307	2006/2007 season (70%)	328	201	158	0	0
38	ESP	Sonia Lafuente	1303	2008/2009 season (100%)	97	148	108	164	164
38	ESP	Sonia Lafuente	1303	2007/2008 season (100%)	224	203	0	0	0
38	ESP	Sonia Lafuente	1303	2006/2007 season (70%)	127	158	115	0	0
39	USA	Kristine Musademba	1266	2008/2009 season (100%)	0	354	250	0	0
39	USA	Kristine Musademba	1266	2007/2008 season (100%)	0	437	225	0	0
39	USA	Kristine Musademba	1266	2006/2007 season (70%)	0	0	0	0	0
40	TUR	Tuğba Karademir	1232	2008/2009 season (100%)	325	0	0	225	0
40	TUR	Tuğba Karademir	1232	2007/2008 season (100%)	293	0	0	225	164
40	TUR	Tuğba Karademir	1232	2006/2007 season (70%)	228	0	0	0	0
41	JPN	Nana Takeda	1227	2008/2009 season (100%)	0	0	0	0	0
41	JPN	Nana Takeda	1227	2007/2008 season (100%)	0	324	236	0	0
41	JPN	Nana Takeda	1227	2006/2007 season (70%)	216	276	175	0	0
42	GER	Annette Dytrt	1208	2008/2009 season (100%)	446	0	0	203	0
42	GER	Annette Dytrt	1208	2007/2008 season (100%)	377	0	0	182	0
42	GER	Annette Dytrt	1208	2006/2007 season (70%)	0	0	0	0	0
43	JPN	Yuki Nishino	1205	2008/2009 season (100%)	0	0	0	0	0
43	JPN	Yuki Nishino	1205	2007/2008 season (100%)	469	486	250	0	0
43	JPN	Yuki Nishino	1205	2006/2007 season (70%)	0	0	0	0	0
44	KOR	Na-Young Kim	1179	2008/2009 season (100%)	222	0	0	0	0
44	KOR	Na-Young Kim	1179	2007/2008 season (100%)	612	203	0	0	0
44	KOR	Na-Young Kim	1179	2006/2007 season (70%)	166	142	0	0	0
45	RUS	Katarina Gerboldt	1122	2008/2009 season (100%)	496	0	0	0	0
45	RUS	Katarina Gerboldt	1122	2007/2008 season (100%)	308	0	0	203	0
45	RUS	Katarina Gerboldt	1122	2006/2007 season (70%)	0	0	0	115	0
46	CHN	Binshu Xu	1092	2008/2009 season (100%)	192	236	0	0	0
46	CHN	Binshu Xu	1092	2007/2008 season (100%)	237	0	0	0	0
46	CHN	Binshu Xu	1092	2006/2007 season (70%)	281	204	134	0	0
47	USA	Becky Bereswill	1028	2008/2009 season (100%)	0	600	225	0	0
47	USA	Becky Bereswill	1028	2007/2008 season (100%)	0	0	0	203	0
47	USA	Becky Bereswill	1028	2006/2007 season (70%)	0	0	0	0	0
48	EST	Svetlana Issakova	970	2008/2009 season (100%)	164	0	0	0	0
48	EST	Svetlana Issakova	970	2007/2008 season (100%)	0	319	225	0	0
48	EST	Svetlana Issakova	970	2006/2007 season (70%)	0	158	104	0	0
49	CAN	Myriane Samson	942	2008/2009 season (100%)	0	0	0	0	0
49	CAN	Myriane Samson	942	2007/2008 season (100%)	277	164	164	0	0
49	CAN	Myriane Samson	942	2006/2007 season (70%)	83	127	127	0	0
50	HUN	Viktória Pavuk	939	2008/2009 season (100%)	0	0	0	203	0
50	HUN	Viktória Pavuk	939	2007/2008 season (100%)	0	213	0	250	0
50	HUN	Viktória Pavuk	939	2006/2007 season (70%)	98	0	0	175	0
51	ITA	Francesca Rio	927	2008/2009 season (100%)	249	0	0	225	203
51	ITA	Francesca Rio	927	2007/2008 season (100%)	0	0	0	250	0
51	ITA	Francesca Rio	927	2006/2007 season (70%)	0	0	0	0	0
52	CAN	Diane Szmiett	926	2008/2009 season (100%)	202	287	225	0	0
52	CAN	Diane Szmiett	926	2007/2008 season (100%)	0	108	0	0	0
52	CAN	Diane Szmiett	926	2006/2007 season (70%)	0	104	0	0	0
53	USA	Melissa Bulanhagui	878	2008/2009 season (100%)	0	250	108	0	0
53	USA	Melissa Bulanhagui	878	2007/2008 season (100%)	0	164	0	0	0
53	USA	Melissa Bulanhagui	878	2006/2007 season (70%)	0	306	158	0	0
54	FRA	Candice Didier	875	2008/2009 season (100%)	237	292	0	182	164
54	FRA	Candice Didier	875	2007/2008 season (100%)	0	0	0	0	0
54	FRA	Candice Didier	875	2006/2007 season (70%)	0	0	0	0	0
55	USA	Angela Maxwell	822	2008/2009 season (100%)	0	394	225	0	0
55	USA	Angela Maxwell	822	2007/2008 season (100%)	0	203	0	0	0
55	USA	Angela Maxwell	822	2006/2007 season (70%)	0	0	0	0	0
56	UZB	Anastasia Gimazetdinova	817	2008/2009 season (100%)	264	191	0	0	0
56	UZB	Anastasia Gimazetdinova	817	2007/2008 season (100%)	362	0	0	0	0
56	UZB	Anastasia Gimazetdinova	817	2006/2007 season (70%)	185	0	0	0	0
57	CZE	Nella Simaova	811	2008/2009 season (100%)	214	0	0	0	0
57	CZE	Nella Simaova	811	2007/2008 season (100%)	192	133	97	0	0
57	CZE	Nella Simaova	811	2006/2007 season (70%)	0	0	0	175	0
58	JPN	Yukiko Fujisawa	790	2008/2009 season (100%)	0	540	250	0	0
58	JPN	Yukiko Fujisawa	790	2007/2008 season (100%)	0	0	0	0	0
58	JPN	Yukiko Fujisawa	790	2006/2007 season (70%)	0	0	0	0	0
59	ISR	Tamar Katz	787	2008/2009 season (100%)	0	0	0	182	0
59	ISR	Tamar Katz	787	2007/2008 season (100%)	173	108	0	0	0
59	ISR	Tamar Katz	787	2006/2007 season (70%)	166	0	0	158	0
60	JPN	Satsuki Muramoto	779	2008/2009 season (100%)	0	120	0	0	0
60	JPN	Satsuki Muramoto	779	2007/2008 season (100%)	0	225	133	0	0
60	JPN	Satsuki Muramoto	779	2006/2007 season (70%)	174	127	0	0	0
61	POL	Anna Jurkiewicz	756	2008/2009 season (100%)	180	0	0	0	0
61	POL	Anna Jurkiewicz	756	2007/2008 season (100%)	126	0	0	225	225
61	POL	Anna Jurkiewicz	756	2006/2007 season (70%)	64	0	0	0	0
62	JPN	Aki Sawada	745	2008/2009 season (100%)	0	0	0	0	0
62	JPN	Aki Sawada	745	2007/2008 season (100%)	0	0	0	0	0
62	JPN	Aki Sawada	745	2006/2007 season (70%)	428	183	134	0	0
63	NED	Karen Venhuizen	698	2008/2009 season (100%)	0	0	0	0	0
63	NED	Karen Venhuizen	698	2007/2008 season (100%)	214	0	0	182	0
63	NED	Karen Venhuizen	698	2006/2007 season (70%)	0	0	0	175	127
64	AUT	Miriam Ziegler	690	2008/2009 season (100%)	182	133	0	0	0
64	AUT	Miriam Ziegler	690	2007/2008 season (100%)	107	148	120	0	0
64	AUT	Miriam Ziegler	690	2006/2007 season (70%)	0	0	0	0	0
65	JPN	Kanako Murakami	687	2008/2009 season (100%)	0	437	250	0	0
65	JPN	Kanako Murakami	687	2007/2008 season (100%)	0	0	0	0	0
65	JPN	Kanako Murakami	687	2006/2007 season (70%)	0	0	0	0	0
66	GER	Isabel Drescher	665	2008/2009 season (100%)	277	120	0	0	0
66	GER	Isabel Drescher	665	2007/2008 season (100%)	0	148	120	0	0
66	GER	Isabel Drescher	665	2006/2007 season (70%)	0	0	0	0	0
66	RUS	Elena Sokolova	665	2008/2009 season (100%)	0	0	0	0	0
66	RUS	Elena Sokolova	665	2007/2008 season (100%)	0	0	0	0	0
66	RUS	Elena Sokolova	665	2006/2007 season (70%)	312	204	149	0	0
68	RUS	Oksana Gozeva	653	2008/2009 season (100%)	308	225	120	0	0
68	RUS	Oksana Gozeva	653	2007/2008 season (100%)	0	0	0	0	0
68	RUS	Oksana Gozeva	653	2006/2007 season (70%)	0	0	0	0	0
69	UKR	Irina Movchan	651	2008/2009 season (100%)	126	0	0	225	0
69	UKR	Irina Movchan	651	2007/2008 season (100%)	0	0	0	164	0
69	UKR	Irina Movchan	651	2006/2007 season (70%)	52	84	0	0	0
70	JPN	Shoko Ishikawa	643	2008/2009 season (100%)	0	182	182	0	0
70	JPN	Shoko Ishikawa	643	2007/2008 season (100%)	0	164	0	0	0
70	JPN	Shoko Ishikawa	643	2006/2007 season (70%)	0	115	0	0	0
71	RUS	Arina Martinova	629	2008/2009 season (100%)	0	0	0	0	0
71	RUS	Arina Martinova	629	2007/2008 season (100%)	0	0	0	0	0
71	RUS	Arina Martinova	629	2006/2007 season (70%)	173	149	149	158	0
72	CHN	Dan Fang	606	2008/2009 season (100%)	0	0	0	0	0
72	CHN	Dan Fang	606	2007/2008 season (100%)	0	213	0	0	0
72	CHN	Dan Fang	606	2006/2007 season (70%)	228	165	0	0	0
73	KOR	Hyeon-Jung Kim	601	2008/2009 season (100%)	214	97	0	0	0
73	KOR	Hyeon-Jung Kim	601	2007/2008 season (100%)	182	108	0	0	0
73	KOR	Hyeon-Jung Kim	601	2006/2007 season (70%)	0	0	0	0	0
74	KOR	Na-Hee Sin	595	2008/2009 season (100%)	0	108	0	0	0
74	KOR	Na-Hee Sin	595	2007/2008 season (100%)	132	164	0	0	0
74	KOR	Na-Hee Sin	595	2006/2007 season (70%)	0	115	76	0	0
75	USA	Juliana Cannarozzo	580	2008/2009 season (100%)	0	0	0	0	0
75	USA	Juliana Cannarozzo	580	2007/2008 season (100%)	0	182	0	0	0
75	USA	Juliana Cannarozzo	580	2006/2007 season (70%)	0	223	175	0	0
76	USA	Amanda Dobbs	569	2008/2009 season (100%)	0	319	250	0	0
76	USA	Amanda Dobbs	569	2007/2008 season (100%)	0	0	0	0	0
76	USA	Amanda Dobbs	569	2006/2007 season (70%)	0	0	0	0	0
76	ROU	Roxana Luca	569	2008/2009 season (100%)	0	0	0	0	0
76	ROU	Roxana Luca	569	2007/2008 season (100%)	92	0	0	203	203
76	ROU	Roxana Luca	569	2006/2007 season (70%)	71	0	0	0	0
78	JPN	Yuka Ishikawa	554	2008/2009 season (100%)	0	148	0	0	0
78	JPN	Yuka Ishikawa	554	2007/2008 season (100%)	0	182	120	0	0
78	JPN	Yuka Ishikawa	554	2006/2007 season (70%)	0	104	0	0	0
79	CHN	Yan Liu	546	2008/2009 season (100%)	293	0	0	0	0
79	CHN	Yan Liu	546	2007/2008 season (100%)	214	0	0	0	0
79	CHN	Yan Liu	546	2006/2007 season (70%)	253	0	0	0	0
80	USA	Chrissy Hughes	537	2008/2009 season (100%)	0	0	0	0	0
80	USA	Chrissy Hughes	537	2007/2008 season (100%)	0	287	250	0	0
80	USA	Chrissy Hughes	537	2006/2007 season (70%)	0	0	0	0	0
81	JPN	Ayane Nakamura	528	2008/2009 season (100%)	0	164	0	0	0
81	JPN	Ayane Nakamura	528	2007/2008 season (100%)	0	182	182	0	0
81	JPN	Ayane Nakamura	528	2006/2007 season (70%)	0	0	0	0	0
82	JPN	Mai Asada	521	2008/2009 season (100%)	0	0	0	0	0
82	JPN	Mai Asada	521	2007/2008 season (100%)	0	191	0	0	0
82	JPN	Mai Asada	521	2006/2007 season (70%)	0	165	165	0	0
83	USA	Megan Oster	515	2008/2009 season (100%)	0	0	0	0	0
83	USA	Megan Oster	515	2007/2008 season (100%)	0	0	0	0	0
83	USA	Megan Oster	515	2006/2007 season (70%)	0	340	175	0	0
84	RUS	Jana Smekhnova	511	2008/2009 season (100%)	0	0	0	0	0
84	RUS	Jana Smekhnova	511	2007/2008 season (100%)	0	203	148	0	0
84	RUS	Jana Smekhnova	511	2006/2007 season (70%)	0	84	76	0	0
85	FRA	Maé-Bérénice Méité	492	2008/2009 season (100%)	224	148	120	0	0
85	FRA	Maé-Bérénice Méité	492	2007/2008 season (100%)	0	0	0	0	0
85	FRA	Maé-Bérénice Méité	492	2006/2007 season (70%)	0	0	0	0	0
86	EST	Olga Ikonnikova	491	2008/2009 season (100%)	0	0	0	0	0
86	EST	Olga Ikonnikova	491	2007/2008 season (100%)	74	120	0	182	0
86	EST	Olga Ikonnikova	491	2006/2007 season (70%)	0	0	0	115	0
87	SLO	Teodora Postic	486	2008/2009 season (100%)	140	0	0	0	0
87	SLO	Teodora Postic	486	2007/2008 season (100%)	0	0	0	182	164
87	SLO	Teodora Postic	486	2006/2007 season (70%)	0	0	0	0	0
88	RUS	Ekaterina Kozireva	485	2008/2009 season (100%)	0	108	0	0	0
88	RUS	Ekaterina Kozireva	485	2007/2008 season (100%)	0	108	108	0	0
88	RUS	Ekaterina Kozireva	485	2006/2007 season (70%)	0	142	127	0	0
88	RUS	Nina Petushkova	485	2008/2009 season (100%)	0	0	0	0	0
88	RUS	Nina Petushkova	485	2007/2008 season (100%)	156	236	0	0	0
88	RUS	Nina Petushkova	485	2006/2007 season (70%)	0	93	0	0	0
90	KOR	Yea-Ji Shin	474	2008/2009 season (100%)	0	0	0	0	0
90	KOR	Yea-Ji Shin	474	2007/2008 season (100%)	0	0	0	0	0
90	KOR	Yea-Ji Shin	474	2006/2007 season (70%)	239	142	93	0	0
91	AUS	Cheltzie Lee	471	2008/2009 season (100%)	237	0	0	0	0
91	AUS	Cheltzie Lee	471	2007/2008 season (100%)	70	164	0	0	0
91	AUS	Cheltzie Lee	471	2006/2007 season (70%)	0	0	0	0	0
92	RUS	Ksenia Doronina	466	2008/2009 season (100%)	0	0	0	0	0
92	RUS	Ksenia Doronina	466	2007/2008 season (100%)	362	0	0	0	0
92	RUS	Ksenia Doronina	466	2006/2007 season (70%)	0	104	0	0	0
92	USA	Blake Rosenthal	466	2008/2009 season (100%)	0	0	0	0	0
92	USA	Blake Rosenthal	466	2007/2008 season (100%)	0	225	148	0	0
92	USA	Blake Rosenthal	466	2006/2007 season (70%)	0	93	0	0	0
94	MEX	Ana Cecilia Cantu	460	2008/2009 season (100%)	156	0	0	164	0
94	MEX	Ana Cecilia Cantu	460	2007/2008 season (100%)	140	0	0	0	0
94	MEX	Ana Cecilia Cantu	460	2006/2007 season (70%)	109	0	0	0	0
94	MEX	Loretta Hamui	460	2008/2009 season (100%)	92	0	0	0	0
94	MEX	Loretta Hamui	460	2007/2008 season (100%)	156	108	0	0	0
94	MEX	Loretta Hamui	460	2006/2007 season (70%)	0	104	0	0	0
96	SWE	Linnea Mellgren	456	2008/2009 season (100%)	0	0	0	164	0
96	SWE	Linnea Mellgren	456	2007/2008 season (100%)	0	148	0	0	0
96	SWE	Linnea Mellgren	456	2006/2007 season (70%)	0	76	68	0	0
97	FIN	Sofia Otala	453	2008/2009 season (100%)	0	0	0	0	0
97	FIN	Sofia Otala	453	2007/2008 season (100%)	97	164	108	0	0
97	FIN	Sofia Otala	453	2006/2007 season (70%)	0	84	0	0	0
97	GER	Constanze Paulinus	453	2008/2009 season (100%)	0	0	0	250	203
97	GER	Constanze Paulinus	453	2007/2008 season (100%)	0	0	0	0	0
97	GER	Constanze Paulinus	453	2006/2007 season (70%)	0	0	0	0	0
99	AUT	Kerstin Frank	442	2008/2009 season (100%)	118	0	0	0	0
99	AUT	Kerstin Frank	442	2007/2008 season (100%)	0	0	0	182	0
99	AUT	Kerstin Frank	442	2006/2007 season (70%)	49	93	0	0	0
100	FRA	Julie Cagnon	430	2008/2009 season (100%)	0	97	0	0	0
100	FRA	Julie Cagnon	430	2007/2008 season (100%)	0	133	97	0	0
100	FRA	Julie Cagnon	430	2006/2007 season (70%)	103	0	0	0	0
101	RUS	Alexandra Ievleva	418	2008/2009 season (100%)	0	0	0	0	0
101	RUS	Alexandra Ievleva	418	2007/2008 season (100%)	0	213	0	0	0
101	RUS	Alexandra Ievleva	418	2006/2007 season (70%)	205	0	0	0	0
102	JPN	Haruka Imai	397	2008/2009 season (100%)	147	250	0	0	0
102	JPN	Haruka Imai	397	2007/2008 season (100%)	0	0	0	0	0
102	JPN	Haruka Imai	397	2006/2007 season (70%)	0	0	0	0	0
103	SWE	Lina Johansson	392	2008/2009 season (100%)	0	0	0	0	0
103	SWE	Lina Johansson	392	2007/2008 season (100%)	0	0	0	0	0
103	SWE	Lina Johansson	392	2006/2007 season (70%)	150	0	0	127	115
104	BUL	Hristina Vassileva	385	2008/2009 season (100%)	0	0	0	0	0
104	BUL	Hristina Vassileva	385	2007/2008 season (100%)	0	0	0	203	182
104	BUL	Hristina Vassileva	385	2006/2007 season (70%)	0	0	0	0	0
105	KOR	Min-Jung Kwak	378	2008/2009 season (100%)	78	203	0	0	0
105	KOR	Min-Jung Kwak	378	2007/2008 season (100%)	0	97	0	0	0
105	KOR	Min-Jung Kwak	378	2006/2007 season (70%)	0	0	0	0	0
106	NZL	Alexandra Rout	375	2008/2009 season (100%)	0	164	0	0	0
106	NZL	Alexandra Rout	375	2007/2008 season (100%)	78	133	0	0	0
106	NZL	Alexandra Rout	375	2006/2007 season (70%)	0	0	0	0	0
107	CZE	Martina Bocek	364	2008/2009 season (100%)	0	0	0	182	0
107	CZE	Martina Bocek	364	2007/2008 season (100%)	0	0	0	182	0
107	CZE	Martina Bocek	364	2006/2007 season (70%)	0	0	0	0	0
107	RUS	Ksenia Makarova	364	2008/2009 season (100%)	0	182	182	0	0
107	RUS	Ksenia Makarova	364	2007/2008 season (100%)	0	0	0	0	0
107	RUS	Ksenia Makarova	364	2006/2007 season (70%)	0	0	0	0	0
109	GER	Katharina Gierok	358	2008/2009 season (100%)	0	0	0	0	0
109	GER	Katharina Gierok	358	2007/2008 season (100%)	0	108	0	250	0
109	GER	Katharina Gierok	358	2006/2007 season (70%)	0	0	0	0	0
110	FRA	Gwendoline Didier	355	2008/2009 season (100%)	0	0	0	0	0
110	FRA	Gwendoline Didier	355	2007/2008 season (100%)	0	191	0	164	0
110	FRA	Gwendoline Didier	355	2006/2007 season (70%)	0	0	0	0	0
111	MEX	Michele Cantu	348	2008/2009 season (100%)	102	0	0	0	0
111	MEX	Michele Cantu	348	2007/2008 season (100%)	0	0	0	182	0
111	MEX	Michele Cantu	348	2006/2007 season (70%)	64	0	0	0	0
112	CHN	Yueren Wang	347	2008/2009 season (100%)	83	0	0	0	0
112	CHN	Yueren Wang	347	2007/2008 season (100%)	264	0	0	0	0
112	CHN	Yueren Wang	347	2006/2007 season (70%)	0	0	0	0	0
113	USA	Brittney Rizo	346	2008/2009 season (100%)	0	182	164	0	0
113	USA	Brittney Rizo	346	2007/2008 season (100%)	0	0	0	0	0
113	USA	Brittney Rizo	346	2006/2007 season (70%)	0	0	0	0	0
114	KOR	Ji Eun Choi	337	2008/2009 season (100%)	0	0	0	0	0
114	KOR	Ji Eun Choi	337	2007/2008 season (100%)	0	0	0	0	0
114	KOR	Ji Eun Choi	337	2006/2007 season (70%)	68	142	127	0	0
115	CHN	Bingwa Geng	326	2008/2009 season (100%)	119	120	0	0	0
115	CHN	Bingwa Geng	326	2007/2008 season (100%)	87	0	0	0	0
115	CHN	Bingwa Geng	326	2006/2007 season (70%)	0	0	0	0	0
116	CAN	Amelie Lacoste	325	2008/2009 season (100%)	325	0	0	0	0
116	CAN	Amelie Lacoste	325	2007/2008 season (100%)	0	0	0	0	0
116	CAN	Amelie Lacoste	325	2006/2007 season (70%)	0	0	0	0	0
117	KOR	Chae-Hwa Kim	323	2008/2009 season (100%)	0	0	0	0	0
117	KOR	Chae-Hwa Kim	323	2007/2008 season (100%)	173	0	0	0	0
117	KOR	Chae-Hwa Kim	323	2006/2007 season (70%)	150	0	0	0	0
118	GER	Sandy Hoffmann	297	2008/2009 season (100%)	0	164	133	0	0
118	GER	Sandy Hoffmann	297	2007/2008 season (100%)	0	0	0	0	0
118	GER	Sandy Hoffmann	297	2006/2007 season (70%)	0	0	0	0	0
118	CAN	Alexandra Najarro	297	2008/2009 season (100%)	0	164	133	0	0
118	CAN	Alexandra Najarro	297	2007/2008 season (100%)	0	0	0	0	0
118	CAN	Alexandra Najarro	297	2006/2007 season (70%)	0	0	0	0	0
120	FRA	Vanessa James	287	2008/2009 season (100%)	0	0	0	0	0
120	FRA	Vanessa James	287	2007/2008 season (100%)	0	0	0	203	0
120	FRA	Vanessa James	287	2006/2007 season (70%)	0	84	0	0	0
121	FIN	Henriikka Hietaniemi	285	2008/2009 season (100%)	0	0	0	0	0
121	FIN	Henriikka Hietaniemi	285	2007/2008 season (100%)	0	0	0	0	0
121	FIN	Henriikka Hietaniemi	285	2006/2007 season (70%)	0	0	0	158	127
122	SVK	Radka Bartova	284	2008/2009 season (100%)	0	0	0	0	0
122	SVK	Radka Bartova	284	2007/2008 season (100%)	0	0	0	0	0
122	SVK	Radka Bartova	284	2006/2007 season (70%)	58	84	0	142	0
123	CAN	Rylie McCulloch-Casarsa	281	2008/2009 season (100%)	0	148	133	0	0
123	CAN	Rylie McCulloch-Casarsa	281	2007/2008 season (100%)	0	0	0	0	0
123	CAN	Rylie McCulloch-Casarsa	281	2006/2007 season (70%)	0	0	0	0	0
124	BEL	Isabelle Pieman	277	2008/2009 season (100%)	74	0	0	0	0
124	BEL	Isabelle Pieman	277	2007/2008 season (100%)	0	0	0	203	0
124	BEL	Isabelle Pieman	277	2006/2007 season (70%)	0	0	0	0	0
125	NED	Manouk Gijsman	274	2008/2009 season (100%)	92	0	0	182	0
125	NED	Manouk Gijsman	274	2007/2008 season (100%)	0	0	0	0	0
125	NED	Manouk Gijsman	274	2006/2007 season (70%)	0	0	0	0	0
126	AUT	Kathrin Freudelsperger	273	2008/2009 season (100%)	0	0	0	0	0
126	AUT	Kathrin Freudelsperger	273	2007/2008 season (100%)	0	0	0	0	0
126	AUT	Kathrin Freudelsperger	273	2006/2007 season (70%)	0	0	0	158	115
127	AUS	Tina Wang	266	2008/2009 season (100%)	140	0	0	0	0
127	AUS	Tina Wang	266	2007/2008 season (100%)	126	0	0	0	0
127	AUS	Tina Wang	266	2006/2007 season (70%)	0	0	0	0	0
128	SWE	Rebecka Emanuelsson	261	2008/2009 season (100%)	0	164	97	0	0
128	SWE	Rebecka Emanuelsson	261	2007/2008 season (100%)	0	0	0	0	0
128	SWE	Rebecka Emanuelsson	261	2006/2007 season (70%)	0	0	0	0	0
129	USA	Megan Hyatt	251	2008/2009 season (100%)	0	0	0	0	0
129	USA	Megan Hyatt	251	2007/2008 season (100%)	0	0	0	0	0
129	USA	Megan Hyatt	251	2006/2007 season (70%)	0	158	93	0	0
130	FRA	Chloe Depouilly	250	2008/2009 season (100%)	0	0	0	0	0
130	FRA	Chloe Depouilly	250	2007/2008 season (100%)	0	0	0	250	0
130	FRA	Chloe Depouilly	250	2006/2007 season (70%)	0	0	0	0	0
131	JPN	Nanoha Sato	245	2008/2009 season (100%)	0	97	0	0	0
131	JPN	Nanoha Sato	245	2007/2008 season (100%)	0	148	0	0	0
131	JPN	Nanoha Sato	245	2006/2007 season (70%)	0	0	0	0	0
132	FRA	Anne Sophie Calvez	243	2008/2009 season (100%)	0	0	0	0	0
132	FRA	Anne Sophie Calvez	243	2007/2008 season (100%)	0	0	0	0	0
132	FRA	Anne Sophie Calvez	243	2006/2007 season (70%)	109	134	0	0	0
133	DEN	Karina Johnson	230	2008/2009 season (100%)	0	133	97	0	0
133	DEN	Karina Johnson	230	2007/2008 season (100%)	0	0	0	0	0
133	DEN	Karina Johnson	230	2006/2007 season (70%)	0	0	0	0	0
134	UKR	Eleonora Vinnichenko	226	2008/2009 season (100%)	107	0	0	0	0
134	UKR	Eleonora Vinnichenko	226	2007/2008 season (100%)	119	0	0	0	0
134	UKR	Eleonora Vinnichenko	226	2006/2007 season (70%)	0	0	0	0	0
135	SUI	Viviane Kã„Ser	225	2008/2009 season (100%)	0	0	0	0	0
135	SUI	Viviane Kã„Ser	225	2007/2008 season (100%)	83	0	0	0	0
135	SUI	Viviane Kã„Ser	225	2006/2007 season (70%)	0	0	0	142	0
135	BUL	Sonia Radeva	225	2008/2009 season (100%)	0	0	0	0	0
135	BUL	Sonia Radeva	225	2007/2008 season (100%)	0	0	0	225	0
135	BUL	Sonia Radeva	225	2006/2007 season (70%)	0	0	0	0	0
135	GER	Mira Sonnenberg	225	2008/2009 season (100%)	0	0	0	0	0
135	GER	Mira Sonnenberg	225	2007/2008 season (100%)	0	0	0	225	0
135	GER	Mira Sonnenberg	225	2006/2007 season (70%)	0	0	0	0	0
135	USA	Megan Williams Stewart	225	2008/2009 season (100%)	0	0	0	0	0
135	USA	Megan Williams Stewart	225	2007/2008 season (100%)	0	0	0	225	0
135	USA	Megan Williams Stewart	225	2006/2007 season (70%)	0	0	0	0	0
139	FRA	Vinciane Fortin	220	2008/2009 season (100%)	0	0	0	0	0
139	FRA	Vinciane Fortin	220	2007/2008 season (100%)	0	0	0	0	0
139	FRA	Vinciane Fortin	220	2006/2007 season (70%)	0	127	93	0	0
139	CAN	Kathryn Kang	220	2008/2009 season (100%)	87	0	0	0	0
139	CAN	Kathryn Kang	220	2007/2008 season (100%)	0	133	0	0	0
139	CAN	Kathryn Kang	220	2006/2007 season (70%)	0	0	0	0	0
141	HKG	Tamami Ono	215	2008/2009 season (100%)	113	0	0	0	0
141	HKG	Tamami Ono	215	2007/2008 season (100%)	102	0	0	0	0
141	HKG	Tamami Ono	215	2006/2007 season (70%)	0	0	0	0	0
142	AUT	Belinda Schã–Nberger	205	2008/2009 season (100%)	0	108	97	0	0
142	AUT	Belinda Schã–Nberger	205	2007/2008 season (100%)	0	0	0	0	0
142	AUT	Belinda Schã–Nberger	205	2006/2007 season (70%)	0	0	0	0	0
143	JPN	Kana Muramoto	203	2008/2009 season (100%)	0	203	0	0	0
143	JPN	Kana Muramoto	203	2007/2008 season (100%)	0	0	0	0	0
143	JPN	Kana Muramoto	203	2006/2007 season (70%)	0	0	0	0	0
143	THA	Charissa Tansomboon	203	2008/2009 season (100%)	0	0	0	0	0
143	THA	Charissa Tansomboon	203	2007/2008 season (100%)	83	120	0	0	0
143	THA	Charissa Tansomboon	203	2006/2007 season (70%)	0	0	0	0	0
143	GER	Kristin Wieczorek	203	2008/2009 season (100%)	0	0	0	0	0
143	GER	Kristin Wieczorek	203	2007/2008 season (100%)	0	0	0	0	0
143	GER	Kristin Wieczorek	203	2006/2007 season (70%)	88	0	0	115	0
146	TPE	Melinda Wang	192	2008/2009 season (100%)	0	0	0	0	0
146	TPE	Melinda Wang	192	2007/2008 season (100%)	192	0	0	0	0
146	TPE	Melinda Wang	192	2006/2007 season (70%)	0	0	0	0	0
147	CAN	Charlotte Belair	182	2008/2009 season (100%)	0	0	0	0	0
147	CAN	Charlotte Belair	182	2007/2008 season (100%)	0	182	0	0	0
147	CAN	Charlotte Belair	182	2006/2007 season (70%)	0	0	0	0	0
147	SUI	Nicole Graf	182	2008/2009 season (100%)	0	0	0	182	0
147	SUI	Nicole Graf	182	2007/2008 season (100%)	0	0	0	0	0
147	SUI	Nicole Graf	182	2006/2007 season (70%)	0	0	0	0	0
147	GER	Katharina Hã„Cker	182	2008/2009 season (100%)	0	0	0	182	0
147	GER	Katharina Hã„Cker	182	2007/2008 season (100%)	0	0	0	0	0
147	GER	Katharina Hã„Cker	182	2006/2007 season (70%)	0	0	0	0	0
147	CZE	Ivana Hudziecova	182	2008/2009 season (100%)	0	0	0	182	0
147	CZE	Ivana Hudziecova	182	2007/2008 season (100%)	0	0	0	0	0
147	CZE	Ivana Hudziecova	182	2006/2007 season (70%)	0	0	0	0	0
147	JPN	Yukina Ohta	182	2008/2009 season (100%)	0	0	0	0	0
147	JPN	Yukina Ohta	182	2007/2008 season (100%)	0	0	0	182	0
147	JPN	Yukina Ohta	182	2006/2007 season (70%)	0	0	0	0	0
147	RUS	Evgania Tarasova	182	2008/2009 season (100%)	0	182	0	0	0
147	RUS	Evgania Tarasova	182	2007/2008 season (100%)	0	0	0	0	0
147	RUS	Evgania Tarasova	182	2006/2007 season (70%)	0	0	0	0	0
147	CAN	Cecylia Witkowski	182	2008/2009 season (100%)	0	182	0	0	0
147	CAN	Cecylia Witkowski	182	2007/2008 season (100%)	0	0	0	0	0
147	CAN	Cecylia Witkowski	182	2006/2007 season (70%)	0	0	0	0	0
154	SUI	Bettina Heim	179	2008/2009 season (100%)	0	0	0	0	0
154	SUI	Bettina Heim	179	2007/2008 season (100%)	0	0	0	0	0
154	SUI	Bettina Heim	179	2006/2007 season (70%)	75	104	0	0	0
155	HUN	Katherine Hadford	170	2008/2009 season (100%)	0	0	0	0	0
155	HUN	Katherine Hadford	170	2007/2008 season (100%)	102	0	0	0	0
155	HUN	Katherine Hadford	170	2006/2007 season (70%)	0	68	0	0	0
156	PHI	Gracielle Jeanne Tan	166	2008/2009 season (100%)	74	0	0	0	0
156	PHI	Gracielle Jeanne Tan	166	2007/2008 season (100%)	92	0	0	0	0
156	PHI	Gracielle Jeanne Tan	166	2006/2007 season (70%)	0	0	0	0	0
157	FIN	Stina Kerã„Nen	165	2008/2009 season (100%)	0	0	0	0	0
157	FIN	Stina Kerã„Nen	165	2007/2008 season (100%)	0	97	0	0	0
157	FIN	Stina Kerã„Nen	165	2006/2007 season (70%)	0	68	0	0	0
158	GER	Jessica Hujsl	164	2008/2009 season (100%)	0	0	0	0	0
158	GER	Jessica Hujsl	164	2007/2008 season (100%)	0	0	0	164	0
158	GER	Jessica Hujsl	164	2006/2007 season (70%)	0	0	0	0	0
158	SVK	Alexandra Kunova	164	2008/2009 season (100%)	0	0	0	164	0
158	SVK	Alexandra Kunova	164	2007/2008 season (100%)	0	0	0	0	0
158	SVK	Alexandra Kunova	164	2006/2007 season (70%)	0	0	0	0	0
158	CRO	Mirna Libric	164	2008/2009 season (100%)	0	0	0	0	0
158	CRO	Mirna Libric	164	2007/2008 season (100%)	0	0	0	164	0
158	CRO	Mirna Libric	164	2006/2007 season (70%)	0	0	0	0	0
158	RUS	Evgenia Pochufarova	164	2008/2009 season (100%)	0	164	0	0	0
158	RUS	Evgenia Pochufarova	164	2007/2008 season (100%)	0	0	0	0	0
158	RUS	Evgenia Pochufarova	164	2006/2007 season (70%)	0	0	0	0	0
162	PUR	Victoria Muniz	160	2008/2009 season (100%)	0	0	0	0	0
162	PUR	Victoria Muniz	160	2007/2008 season (100%)	0	0	0	0	0
162	PUR	Victoria Muniz	160	2006/2007 season (70%)	92	68	0	0	0
163	USA	Danielle Kahle	158	2008/2009 season (100%)	0	0	0	0	0
163	USA	Danielle Kahle	158	2007/2008 season (100%)	0	0	0	0	0
163	USA	Danielle Kahle	158	2006/2007 season (70%)	0	0	0	158	0
164	CHN	Zhenni Ruan	148	2008/2009 season (100%)	0	148	0	0	0
164	CHN	Zhenni Ruan	148	2007/2008 season (100%)	0	0	0	0	0
164	CHN	Zhenni Ruan	148	2006/2007 season (70%)	0	0	0	0	0
164	USA	Marissa Secundy	148	2008/2009 season (100%)	0	148	0	0	0
164	USA	Marissa Secundy	148	2007/2008 season (100%)	0	0	0	0	0
164	USA	Marissa Secundy	148	2006/2007 season (70%)	0	0	0	0	0
164	CAN	Dana Zhalko-Tytarenko	148	2008/2009 season (100%)	0	148	0	0	0
164	CAN	Dana Zhalko-Tytarenko	148	2007/2008 season (100%)	0	0	0	0	0
164	CAN	Dana Zhalko-Tytarenko	148	2006/2007 season (70%)	0	0	0	0	0
167	USA	Katy Taylor	142	2008/2009 season (100%)	0	0	0	0	0
167	USA	Katy Taylor	142	2007/2008 season (100%)	0	0	0	0	0
167	USA	Katy Taylor	142	2006/2007 season (70%)	0	0	0	142	0
167	RUS	Margarita Tertichnaia	142	2008/2009 season (100%)	0	0	0	0	0
167	RUS	Margarita Tertichnaia	142	2007/2008 season (100%)	0	0	0	0	0
167	RUS	Margarita Tertichnaia	142	2006/2007 season (70%)	0	142	0	0	0
169	RUS	Viktoria Volchkova	134	2008/2009 season (100%)	0	0	0	0	0
169	RUS	Viktoria Volchkova	134	2007/2008 season (100%)	0	0	0	0	0
169	RUS	Viktoria Volchkova	134	2006/2007 season (70%)	0	134	0	0	0
170	USA	Carolyn Ann Alba	133	2008/2009 season (100%)	0	0	0	0	0
170	USA	Carolyn Ann Alba	133	2007/2008 season (100%)	0	133	0	0	0
170	USA	Carolyn Ann Alba	133	2006/2007 season (70%)	0	0	0	0	0
170	EST	Johanna Allik	133	2008/2009 season (100%)	0	133	0	0	0
170	EST	Johanna Allik	133	2007/2008 season (100%)	0	0	0	0	0
170	EST	Johanna Allik	133	2006/2007 season (70%)	0	0	0	0	0
170	ITA	Roberta Rodeghiero	133	2008/2009 season (100%)	0	133	0	0	0
170	ITA	Roberta Rodeghiero	133	2007/2008 season (100%)	0	0	0	0	0
170	ITA	Roberta Rodeghiero	133	2006/2007 season (70%)	0	0	0	0	0
173	TPE	Chaochih Liu	132	2008/2009 season (100%)	132	0	0	0	0
173	TPE	Chaochih Liu	132	2007/2008 season (100%)	0	0	0	0	0
173	TPE	Chaochih Liu	132	2006/2007 season (70%)	0	0	0	0	0
174	JPN	Mutsumi Takayama	127	2008/2009 season (100%)	0	0	0	0	0
174	JPN	Mutsumi Takayama	127	2007/2008 season (100%)	0	0	0	0	0
174	JPN	Mutsumi Takayama	127	2006/2007 season (70%)	0	127	0	0	0
175	TPE	Jennie Lee	123	2008/2009 season (100%)	0	0	0	0	0
175	TPE	Jennie Lee	123	2007/2008 season (100%)	0	0	0	0	0
175	TPE	Jennie Lee	123	2006/2007 season (70%)	55	68	0	0	0
176	AUS	Joanne Carter	121	2008/2009 season (100%)	0	0	0	0	0
176	AUS	Joanne Carter	121	2007/2008 season (100%)	0	0	0	0	0
176	AUS	Joanne Carter	121	2006/2007 season (70%)	121	0	0	0	0
176	CRO	Idora Hegel	121	2008/2009 season (100%)	0	0	0	0	0
176	CRO	Idora Hegel	121	2007/2008 season (100%)	0	0	0	0	0
176	CRO	Idora Hegel	121	2006/2007 season (70%)	121	0	0	0	0
178	EST	Jasmine Alexandra Costa	120	2008/2009 season (100%)	0	120	0	0	0
178	EST	Jasmine Alexandra Costa	120	2007/2008 season (100%)	0	0	0	0	0
178	EST	Jasmine Alexandra Costa	120	2006/2007 season (70%)	0	0	0	0	0
178	FRA	Caroline Delome Sensat	120	2008/2009 season (100%)	0	0	0	0	0
178	FRA	Caroline Delome Sensat	120	2007/2008 season (100%)	0	120	0	0	0
178	FRA	Caroline Delome Sensat	120	2006/2007 season (70%)	0	0	0	0	0
178	CAN	Rika Inoda	120	2008/2009 season (100%)	0	0	0	0	0
178	CAN	Rika Inoda	120	2007/2008 season (100%)	0	120	0	0	0
178	CAN	Rika Inoda	120	2006/2007 season (70%)	0	0	0	0	0
178	SWE	Isabelle M. Olsson	120	2008/2009 season (100%)	0	120	0	0	0
178	SWE	Isabelle M. Olsson	120	2007/2008 season (100%)	0	0	0	0	0
178	SWE	Isabelle M. Olsson	120	2006/2007 season (70%)	0	0	0	0	0
178	USA	Tenile Victorsen	120	2008/2009 season (100%)	0	120	0	0	0
178	USA	Tenile Victorsen	120	2007/2008 season (100%)	0	0	0	0	0
178	USA	Tenile Victorsen	120	2006/2007 season (70%)	0	0	0	0	0
183	JPN	Haruka Inoue	115	2008/2009 season (100%)	0	0	0	0	0
183	JPN	Haruka Inoue	115	2007/2008 season (100%)	0	0	0	0	0
183	JPN	Haruka Inoue	115	2006/2007 season (70%)	0	115	0	0	0
183	JPN	Risa Mochizuki	115	2008/2009 season (100%)	0	0	0	0	0
183	JPN	Risa Mochizuki	115	2007/2008 season (100%)	0	0	0	0	0
183	JPN	Risa Mochizuki	115	2006/2007 season (70%)	0	115	0	0	0
185	RSA	Lejeanne Marais	113	2008/2009 season (100%)	0	0	0	0	0
185	RSA	Lejeanne Marais	113	2007/2008 season (100%)	113	0	0	0	0
185	RSA	Lejeanne Marais	113	2006/2007 season (70%)	0	0	0	0	0
186	RUS	Dinara Vasfieva	108	2008/2009 season (100%)	0	108	0	0	0
186	RUS	Dinara Vasfieva	108	2007/2008 season (100%)	0	0	0	0	0
186	RUS	Dinara Vasfieva	108	2006/2007 season (70%)	0	0	0	0	0
187	ITA	Nicole Della Monica	104	2008/2009 season (100%)	0	0	0	0	0
187	ITA	Nicole Della Monica	104	2007/2008 season (100%)	0	0	0	0	0
187	ITA	Nicole Della Monica	104	2006/2007 season (70%)	0	104	0	0	0
188	GBR	Karly Robertson	102	2008/2009 season (100%)	102	0	0	0	0
188	GBR	Karly Robertson	102	2007/2008 season (100%)	0	0	0	0	0
188	GBR	Karly Robertson	102	2006/2007 season (70%)	0	0	0	0	0
189	MEX	Emily Naphtal	98	2008/2009 season (100%)	0	0	0	0	0
189	MEX	Emily Naphtal	98	2007/2008 season (100%)	0	0	0	0	0
189	MEX	Emily Naphtal	98	2006/2007 season (70%)	98	0	0	0	0
190	CAN	McKenzie Crawford	97	2008/2009 season (100%)	0	97	0	0	0
190	CAN	McKenzie Crawford	97	2007/2008 season (100%)	0	0	0	0	0
190	CAN	McKenzie Crawford	97	2006/2007 season (70%)	0	0	0	0	0
190	NOR	Erle Harstad	97	2008/2009 season (100%)	0	0	0	0	0
190	NOR	Erle Harstad	97	2007/2008 season (100%)	0	97	0	0	0
190	NOR	Erle Harstad	97	2006/2007 season (70%)	0	0	0	0	0
190	GER	Isabel Heintges	97	2008/2009 season (100%)	0	0	0	0	0
190	GER	Isabel Heintges	97	2007/2008 season (100%)	0	97	0	0	0
190	GER	Isabel Heintges	97	2006/2007 season (70%)	0	0	0	0	0
190	JPN	Yurina Nobuhara	97	2008/2009 season (100%)	0	0	0	0	0
190	JPN	Yurina Nobuhara	97	2007/2008 season (100%)	0	97	0	0	0
190	JPN	Yurina Nobuhara	97	2006/2007 season (70%)	0	0	0	0	0
194	KOR	Soo-Hyun Kim	93	2008/2009 season (100%)	0	0	0	0	0
194	KOR	Soo-Hyun Kim	93	2007/2008 season (100%)	0	0	0	0	0
194	KOR	Soo-Hyun Kim	93	2006/2007 season (70%)	0	93	0	0	0
194	USA	Molly Oberstar	93	2008/2009 season (100%)	0	0	0	0	0
194	USA	Molly Oberstar	93	2007/2008 season (100%)	0	0	0	0	0
194	USA	Molly Oberstar	93	2006/2007 season (70%)	0	93	0	0	0
196	TPE	Jocelyn Ho	88	2008/2009 season (100%)	0	0	0	0	0
196	TPE	Jocelyn Ho	88	2007/2008 season (100%)	0	0	0	0	0
196	TPE	Jocelyn Ho	88	2006/2007 season (70%)	88	0	0	0	0
197	ITA	Marcella De Trovato	84	2008/2009 season (100%)	0	0	0	0	0
197	ITA	Marcella De Trovato	84	2007/2008 season (100%)	0	0	0	0	0
197	ITA	Marcella De Trovato	84	2006/2007 season (70%)	0	84	0	0	0
197	CAN	Devon Neuls	84	2008/2009 season (100%)	0	0	0	0	0
197	CAN	Devon Neuls	84	2007/2008 season (100%)	0	0	0	0	0
197	CAN	Devon Neuls	84	2006/2007 season (70%)	0	84	0	0	0
197	CAN	Erika Tisluck	84	2008/2009 season (100%)	0	0	0	0	0
197	CAN	Erika Tisluck	84	2007/2008 season (100%)	0	0	0	0	0
197	CAN	Erika Tisluck	84	2006/2007 season (70%)	0	84	0	0	0
200	GER	Christiane Berger	79	2008/2009 season (100%)	0	0	0	0	0
200	GER	Christiane Berger	79	2007/2008 season (100%)	0	0	0	0	0
200	GER	Christiane Berger	79	2006/2007 season (70%)	79	0	0	0	0
200	IND	Ami Parekh	79	2008/2009 season (100%)	0	0	0	0	0
200	IND	Ami Parekh	79	2007/2008 season (100%)	0	0	0	0	0
200	IND	Ami Parekh	79	2006/2007 season (70%)	79	0	0	0	0
202	JPN	Akiko Kitamura	76	2008/2009 season (100%)	0	0	0	0	0
202	JPN	Akiko Kitamura	76	2007/2008 season (100%)	0	0	0	0	0
202	JPN	Akiko Kitamura	76	2006/2007 season (70%)	0	76	0	0	0
202	AUT	Astrid Mangi	76	2008/2009 season (100%)	0	0	0	0	0
202	AUT	Astrid Mangi	76	2007/2008 season (100%)	0	0	0	0	0
202	AUT	Astrid Mangi	76	2006/2007 season (70%)	0	76	0	0	0
204	MEX	Corenne Bruhns	74	2008/2009 season (100%)	0	0	0	0	0
204	MEX	Corenne Bruhns	74	2007/2008 season (100%)	74	0	0	0	0
204	MEX	Corenne Bruhns	74	2006/2007 season (70%)	0	0	0	0	0
205	AUS	Phoebe Di Tommaso	71	2008/2009 season (100%)	0	0	0	0	0
205	AUS	Phoebe Di Tommaso	71	2007/2008 season (100%)	0	0	0	0	0
205	AUS	Phoebe Di Tommaso	71	2006/2007 season (70%)	71	0	0	0	0
206	TPE	Colleen Burkhead	68	2008/2009 season (100%)	0	0	0	0	0
206	TPE	Colleen Burkhead	68	2007/2008 season (100%)	0	0	0	0	0
206	TPE	Colleen Burkhead	68	2006/2007 season (70%)	0	68	0	0	0
206	ISR	Jenna Syken	68	2008/2009 season (100%)	0	0	0	0	0
206	ISR	Jenna Syken	68	2007/2008 season (100%)	0	0	0	0	0
206	ISR	Jenna Syken	68	2006/2007 season (70%)	0	68	0	0	0
208	BLR	Katsiarina Pakhamovich	63	2008/2009 season (100%)	63	0	0	0	0
208	BLR	Katsiarina Pakhamovich	63	2007/2008 season (100%)	0	0	0	0	0
208	BLR	Katsiarina Pakhamovich	63	2006/2007 season (70%)	0	0	0	0	0
209	BLR	Julia Sheremet	61	2008/2009 season (100%)	0	0	0	0	0
209	BLR	Julia Sheremet	61	2007/2008 season (100%)	0	0	0	0	0
209	BLR	Julia Sheremet	61	2006/2007 season (70%)	61	0	0	0	0
210	RSA	Abigail Pietersen	58	2008/2009 season (100%)	0	0	0	0	0
210	RSA	Abigail Pietersen	58	2007/2008 season (100%)	0	0	0	0	0
210	RSA	Abigail Pietersen	58	2006/2007 season (70%)	58	0	0	0	0
211	GER	Brigitte Blickling	44	2008/2009 season (100%)	0	0	0	0	0
211	GER	Brigitte Blickling	44	2007/2008 season (100%)	0	0	0	0	0
211	GER	Brigitte Blickling	44	2006/2007 season (70%)	44	0	0	0	0

==== Pairs (88 couples) ====
As of 26 March 2009

Rank	Nation	Couple	Points	Season	ISU Championships or Olympics	(Junior) Grand Prix and Final		Selected International Competition	
Rank	Nation	Couple	Points	Season	Best	Best	2nd Best	Best	2nd Best
1	GER	Aliona Savchenko / Robin Szolkowy	5252	2008/2009 season (100%)	1200	648	400	250	0
1	GER	Aliona Savchenko / Robin Szolkowy	5252	2007/2008 season (100%)	1200	800	400	250	0
1	GER	Aliona Savchenko / Robin Szolkowy	5252	2006/2007 season (70%)	680	504	280	0	0
2	CHN	Dan Zhang / Hao Zhang	4454	2008/2009 season (100%)	1080	720	400	0	0
2	CHN	Dan Zhang / Hao Zhang	4454	2007/2008 season (100%)	1080	720	400	0	0
2	CHN	Dan Zhang / Hao Zhang	4454	2006/2007 season (70%)	551	454	280	0	0
3	CHN	Qing Pang / Jian Tong	3963	2008/2009 season (100%)	875	800	400	0	0
3	CHN	Qing Pang / Jian Tong	3963	2007/2008 season (100%)	840	648	400	0	0
3	CHN	Qing Pang / Jian Tong	3963	2006/2007 season (70%)	756	252	0	0	0
4	RUS	Yuko Kavaguti / Alexander Smirnov	3871	2008/2009 season (100%)	972	525	400	250	0
4	RUS	Yuko Kavaguti / Alexander Smirnov	3871	2007/2008 season (100%)	875	525	324	0	0
4	RUS	Yuko Kavaguti / Alexander Smirnov	3871	2006/2007 season (70%)	362	227	0	0	0
5	CAN	Jessica Dube / Bryce Davison	3395	2008/2009 season (100%)	756	360	324	0	0
5	CAN	Jessica Dube / Bryce Davison	3395	2007/2008 season (100%)	972	583	400	0	0
5	CAN	Jessica Dube / Bryce Davison	3395	2006/2007 season (70%)	447	0	0	0	0
6	RUS	Maria Mukhortova / Maxim Trankov	3216	2008/2009 season (100%)	787	472	360	225	0
6	RUS	Maria Mukhortova / Maxim Trankov	3216	2007/2008 season (100%)	756	324	292	0	0
6	RUS	Maria Mukhortova / Maxim Trankov	3216	2006/2007 season (70%)	293	183	149	0	0
7	UKR	Tatiana Volosozhar / Stanislav Morozov	3022	2008/2009 season (100%)	709	583	360	203	0
7	UKR	Tatiana Volosozhar / Stanislav Morozov	3022	2007/2008 season (100%)	612	292	262	0	0
7	UKR	Tatiana Volosozhar / Stanislav Morozov	3022	2006/2007 season (70%)	613	0	0	0	0
8	RUS	Ksenia Krasilnikova / Konstantin Bezmaternikh	2846	2008/2009 season (100%)	0	486	250	0	0
8	RUS	Ksenia Krasilnikova / Konstantin Bezmaternikh	2846	2007/2008 season (100%)	715	600	262	0	0
8	RUS	Ksenia Krasilnikova / Konstantin Bezmaternikh	2846	2006/2007 season (70%)	405	378	175	0	0
9	USA	Keauna McLaughlin / Rockne Brubaker	2552	2008/2009 season (100%)	551	360	324	0	0
9	USA	Keauna McLaughlin / Rockne Brubaker	2552	2007/2008 season (100%)	0	360	360	0	0
9	USA	Keauna McLaughlin / Rockne Brubaker	2552	2006/2007 season (70%)	501	420	175	0	0
10	CAN	Meagan Duhamel / Craig Buntin	2398	2008/2009 season (100%)	612	324	292	0	0
10	CAN	Meagan Duhamel / Craig Buntin	2398	2007/2008 season (100%)	709	236	0	225	0
10	CAN	Meagan Duhamel / Craig Buntin	2398	2006/2007 season (70%)	0	0	0	0	0
10	USA	Rena Inoue / John Baldwin	2398	2008/2009 season (100%)	446	360	262	0	0
10	USA	Rena Inoue / John Baldwin	2398	2007/2008 season (100%)	612	0	0	0	0
10	USA	Rena Inoue / John Baldwin	2398	2006/2007 season (70%)	476	408	280	0	0
12	RUS	Lubov Iliushechkina / Nodari Maisuradze	2251	2008/2009 season (100%)	715	600	292	0	0
12	RUS	Lubov Iliushechkina / Nodari Maisuradze	2251	2007/2008 season (100%)	644	0	0	0	0
12	RUS	Lubov Iliushechkina / Nodari Maisuradze	2251	2006/2007 season (70%)	0	0	0	0	0
13	RUS	Ekaterina Sheremetieva / Mikhail Kuznetsov	2169	2008/2009 season (100%)	469	225	0	164	0
13	RUS	Ekaterina Sheremetieva / Mikhail Kuznetsov	2169	2007/2008 season (100%)	521	540	250	0	0
13	RUS	Ekaterina Sheremetieva / Mikhail Kuznetsov	2169	2006/2007 season (70%)	0	0	0	0	0
14	CHN	Yue Zhang / Lei Wang	2135	2008/2009 season (100%)	342	540	262	0	0
14	CHN	Yue Zhang / Lei Wang	2135	2007/2008 season (100%)	380	319	292	0	0
14	CHN	Yue Zhang / Lei Wang	2135	2006/2007 season (70%)	0	0	0	0	0
15	GBR	Stacey Kemp / David King	1930	2008/2009 season (100%)	339	292	0	250	0
15	GBR	Stacey Kemp / David King	1930	2007/2008 season (100%)	496	213	191	0	0
15	GBR	Stacey Kemp / David King	1930	2006/2007 season (70%)	205	149	0	0	0
16	FRA	Adeline Canac / Maximin Coia	1768	2008/2009 season (100%)	362	236	213	203	0
16	FRA	Adeline Canac / Maximin Coia	1768	2007/2008 season (100%)	305	236	213	0	0
16	FRA	Adeline Canac / Maximin Coia	1768	2006/2007 season (70%)	166	149	0	0	0
17	CAN	Anabelle Langlois / Cody Hay	1658	2008/2009 season (100%)	0	0	0	0	0
17	CAN	Anabelle Langlois / Cody Hay	1658	2007/2008 season (100%)	574	292	262	0	0
17	CAN	Anabelle Langlois / Cody Hay	1658	2006/2007 season (70%)	326	204	0	0	0
18	USA	Tiffany Vise / Derek Trent	1644	2008/2009 season (100%)	0	262	262	0	0
18	USA	Tiffany Vise / Derek Trent	1644	2007/2008 season (100%)	402	292	262	164	0
18	USA	Tiffany Vise / Derek Trent	1644	2006/2007 season (70%)	0	183	165	0	0
19	CAN	Amanda Velenosi / Mark Fernandez	1642	2008/2009 season (100%)	0	213	164	0	0
19	CAN	Amanda Velenosi / Mark Fernandez	1642	2007/2008 season (100%)	308	437	225	0	0
19	CAN	Amanda Velenosi / Mark Fernandez	1642	2006/2007 season (70%)	295	142	104	0	0
20	CAN	Mylene Brodeur / John Mattatall	1566	2008/2009 season (100%)	465	292	236	0	0
20	CAN	Mylene Brodeur / John Mattatall	1566	2007/2008 season (100%)	446	0	0	0	0
20	CAN	Mylene Brodeur / John Mattatall	1566	2006/2007 season (70%)	0	0	0	127	0
21	CHN	Huibo Dong / Yiming Wu	1557	2008/2009 season (100%)	362	292	191	0	0
21	CHN	Huibo Dong / Yiming Wu	1557	2007/2008 season (100%)	579	133	0	0	0
21	CHN	Huibo Dong / Yiming Wu	1557	2006/2007 season (70%)	0	0	0	0	0
22	EST	Maria Sergejeva / Ilja Glebov	1547	2008/2009 season (100%)	224	262	148	0	0
22	EST	Maria Sergejeva / Ilja Glebov	1547	2007/2008 season (100%)	422	236	213	0	0
22	EST	Maria Sergejeva / Ilja Glebov	1547	2006/2007 season (70%)	266	93	76	0	0
23	CHN	Jiaqi Li / Jiankun Xu	1520	2008/2009 season (100%)	0	0	0	0	0
23	CHN	Jiaqi Li / Jiankun Xu	1520	2007/2008 season (100%)	496	262	236	0	0
23	CHN	Jiaqi Li / Jiankun Xu	1520	2006/2007 season (70%)	194	183	149	0	0
24	RUS	Vera Bazarova / Yuri Larionov	1406	2008/2009 season (100%)	0	0	0	0	0
24	RUS	Vera Bazarova / Yuri Larionov	1406	2007/2008 season (100%)	0	324	250	0	0
24	RUS	Vera Bazarova / Yuri Larionov	1406	2006/2007 season (70%)	451	223	158	0	0
25	RUS	Anastasia Martiusheva / Alexei Rogonov	1331	2008/2009 season (100%)	644	437	250	0	0
25	RUS	Anastasia Martiusheva / Alexei Rogonov	1331	2007/2008 season (100%)	0	0	0	0	0
25	RUS	Anastasia Martiusheva / Alexei Rogonov	1331	2006/2007 season (70%)	0	0	0	0	0
26	POL	Dominika Piatkowska / Dmitri Khromin	1324	2008/2009 season (100%)	0	0	0	0	0
26	POL	Dominika Piatkowska / Dmitri Khromin	1324	2007/2008 season (100%)	362	213	213	0	0
26	POL	Dominika Piatkowska / Dmitri Khromin	1324	2006/2007 season (70%)	237	165	134	0	0
27	ITA	Laura Magitteri / Ondrej Hotárek	1255	2008/2009 season (100%)	0	236	0	0	0
27	ITA	Laura Magitteri / Ondrej Hotárek	1255	2007/2008 season (100%)	339	236	191	0	0
27	ITA	Laura Magitteri / Ondrej Hotárek	1255	2006/2007 season (70%)	253	0	0	0	0
28	USA	Brooke Castile / Benjamin Okolski	1241	2008/2009 season (100%)	0	0	0	0	0
28	USA	Brooke Castile / Benjamin Okolski	1241	2007/2008 season (100%)	680	0	0	0	0
28	USA	Brooke Castile / Benjamin Okolski	1241	2006/2007 season (70%)	386	0	0	175	0
29	JPN	Narumi Takahashi / Mervin Tran	1214	2008/2009 season (100%)	380	319	203	0	0
29	JPN	Narumi Takahashi / Mervin Tran	1214	2007/2008 season (100%)	164	148	0	0	0
29	JPN	Narumi Takahashi / Mervin Tran	1214	2006/2007 season (70%)	0	0	0	0	0
30	USA	Marissa Castelli / Simon Shnapir	1212	2008/2009 season (100%)	579	354	182	0	0
30	USA	Marissa Castelli / Simon Shnapir	1212	2007/2008 season (100%)	0	97	0	0	0
30	USA	Marissa Castelli / Simon Shnapir	1212	2006/2007 season (70%)	0	0	0	0	0
31	RUS	Maria Petrova / Alexei Tikhonov	1139	2008/2009 season (100%)	0	0	0	0	0
31	RUS	Maria Petrova / Alexei Tikhonov	1139	2007/2008 season (100%)	0	0	0	0	0
31	RUS	Maria Petrova / Alexei Tikhonov	1139	2006/2007 season (70%)	529	330	280	0	0
32	USA	Amanda Evora / Mark Ladwig	1000	2008/2009 season (100%)	0	292	213	0	0
32	USA	Amanda Evora / Mark Ladwig	1000	2007/2008 season (100%)	0	292	0	203	0
32	USA	Amanda Evora / Mark Ladwig	1000	2006/2007 season (70%)	0	0	0	0	0
33	CAN	Paige Lawrence / Rudi Swiegers	987	2008/2009 season (100%)	521	164	120	0	0
33	CAN	Paige Lawrence / Rudi Swiegers	987	2007/2008 season (100%)	0	182	0	0	0
33	CAN	Paige Lawrence / Rudi Swiegers	987	2006/2007 season (70%)	0	0	0	0	0
34	SUI	Anaïs Morand / Antoine Dorsaz	941	2008/2009 season (100%)	305	148	120	0	0
34	SUI	Anaïs Morand / Antoine Dorsaz	941	2007/2008 season (100%)	224	0	0	0	0
34	SUI	Anaïs Morand / Antoine Dorsaz	941	2006/2007 season (70%)	174	76	68	0	0
35	ITA	Marika Zanforlin / Federico Degli Esposti	908	2008/2009 season (100%)	237	0	0	182	164
35	ITA	Marika Zanforlin / Federico Degli Esposti	908	2007/2008 season (100%)	325	0	0	0	0
35	ITA	Marika Zanforlin / Federico Degli Esposti	908	2006/2007 season (70%)	0	0	0	0	0
36	ITA	Nicole Della Monica / Yannick Kocon	903	2008/2009 season (100%)	496	0	0	225	0
36	ITA	Nicole Della Monica / Yannick Kocon	903	2007/2008 season (100%)	182	0	0	0	0
36	ITA	Nicole Della Monica / Yannick Kocon	903	2006/2007 season (70%)	0	0	0	0	0
37	GER	Mari Vartmann / Florian Just	892	2008/2009 season (100%)	0	0	0	0	0
37	GER	Mari Vartmann / Florian Just	892	2007/2008 season (100%)	446	0	0	0	0
37	GER	Mari Vartmann / Florian Just	892	2006/2007 season (70%)	312	134	0	0	0
38	CAN	Monica Pisotta / Michael Stewart	889	2008/2009 season (100%)	0	236	191	0	0
38	CAN	Monica Pisotta / Michael Stewart	889	2007/2008 season (100%)	342	120	0	0	0
38	CAN	Monica Pisotta / Michael Stewart	889	2006/2007 season (70%)	0	0	0	0	0
39	RUS	Arina Ushakova / Sergei Karev	865	2008/2009 season (100%)	0	0	0	0	0
39	RUS	Arina Ushakova / Sergei Karev	865	2007/2008 season (100%)	551	0	0	0	0
39	RUS	Arina Ushakova / Sergei Karev	865	2006/2007 season (70%)	0	115	84	115	0
40	RUS	Julia Obertas / Sergei Slavnov	820	2008/2009 season (100%)	0	0	0	0	0
40	RUS	Julia Obertas / Sergei Slavnov	820	2007/2008 season (100%)	0	0	0	0	0
40	RUS	Julia Obertas / Sergei Slavnov	820	2006/2007 season (70%)	428	227	165	0	0
41	TPE	Amanda Sunyoto-Yang / Darryll Sulindro-Yang	791	2008/2009 season (100%)	325	0	0	0	0
41	TPE	Amanda Sunyoto-Yang / Darryll Sulindro-Yang	791	2007/2008 season (100%)	202	120	0	0	0
41	TPE	Amanda Sunyoto-Yang / Darryll Sulindro-Yang	791	2006/2007 season (70%)	157	76	68	0	0
42	USA	Bianca Butler / Joseph Jacobsen	785	2008/2009 season (100%)	0	0	0	0	0
42	USA	Bianca Butler / Joseph Jacobsen	785	2007/2008 season (100%)	249	354	182	0	0
42	USA	Bianca Butler / Joseph Jacobsen	785	2006/2007 season (70%)	0	0	0	0	0
43	RUS	Sabina Imaikina / Andrei Novoselov	752	2008/2009 season (100%)	0	394	225	0	0
43	RUS	Sabina Imaikina / Andrei Novoselov	752	2007/2008 season (100%)	0	133	0	0	0
43	RUS	Sabina Imaikina / Andrei Novoselov	752	2006/2007 season (70%)	0	0	0	0	0
44	ISR	Ekaterina Sokolova / Fedor Sokolov	732	2008/2009 season (100%)	113	191	0	164	0
44	ISR	Ekaterina Sokolova / Fedor Sokolov	732	2007/2008 season (100%)	264	0	0	0	0
44	ISR	Ekaterina Sokolova / Fedor Sokolov	732	2006/2007 season (70%)	0	0	0	0	0
45	FRA	Melodie Chataigner / Medhi Bouzzine	727	2008/2009 season (100%)	0	191	0	0	0
45	FRA	Melodie Chataigner / Medhi Bouzzine	727	2007/2008 season (100%)	402	0	0	0	0
45	FRA	Melodie Chataigner / Medhi Bouzzine	727	2006/2007 season (70%)	0	134	0	0	0
46	USA	Caydee Denney / Jeremy Barrett	699	2008/2009 season (100%)	517	0	0	182	0
46	USA	Caydee Denney / Jeremy Barrett	699	2007/2008 season (100%)	0	0	0	0	0
46	USA	Caydee Denney / Jeremy Barrett	699	2006/2007 season (70%)	0	0	0	0	0
47	USA	Chelsi Guillen / Danny Curzon	695	2008/2009 season (100%)	0	213	0	0	0
47	USA	Chelsi Guillen / Danny Curzon	695	2007/2008 season (100%)	277	108	97	0	0
47	USA	Chelsi Guillen / Danny Curzon	695	2006/2007 season (70%)	0	0	0	0	0
48	UZB	Marina Aganina / Dmitri Zobnin	655	2008/2009 season (100%)	293	0	0	0	0
48	UZB	Marina Aganina / Dmitri Zobnin	655	2007/2008 season (100%)	362	0	0	0	0
48	UZB	Marina Aganina / Dmitri Zobnin	655	2006/2007 season (70%)	0	0	0	0	0
49	POL	Krystyna Klimczak / Janusz Karweta	636	2008/2009 season (100%)	202	0	0	0	0
49	POL	Krystyna Klimczak / Janusz Karweta	636	2007/2008 season (100%)	147	287	0	0	0
49	POL	Krystyna Klimczak / Janusz Karweta	636	2006/2007 season (70%)	141	0	0	0	0
50	RUS	Anastaisa Khodkova / Pavel Sliusarenko	597	2008/2009 season (100%)	0	0	0	0	0
50	RUS	Anastaisa Khodkova / Pavel Sliusarenko	597	2007/2008 season (100%)	0	394	203	0	0
50	RUS	Anastaisa Khodkova / Pavel Sliusarenko	597	2006/2007 season (70%)	0	0	0	0	0
51	FRA	Vanessa James / Yannick Bonheur	590	2008/2009 season (100%)	377	213	0	0	0
51	FRA	Vanessa James / Yannick Bonheur	590	2007/2008 season (100%)	0	0	0	0	0
51	FRA	Vanessa James / Yannick Bonheur	590	2006/2007 season (70%)	0	0	0	0	0
52	USA	Brynn Carman / Chris Knierim	580	2008/2009 season (100%)	308	164	108	0	0
52	USA	Brynn Carman / Chris Knierim	580	2007/2008 season (100%)	0	0	0	0	0
52	USA	Brynn Carman / Chris Knierim	580	2006/2007 season (70%)	0	0	0	0	0
52	UKR	Ekaterina Kostenko / Roman Talan	580	2008/2009 season (100%)	140	0	0	203	0
52	UKR	Ekaterina Kostenko / Roman Talan	580	2007/2008 season (100%)	237	0	0	0	0
52	UKR	Ekaterina Kostenko / Roman Talan	580	2006/2007 season (70%)	0	0	0	0	0
54	USA	Naomi Nari Nam / Themistocles Leftheris	574	2008/2009 season (100%)	0	0	0	0	0
54	USA	Naomi Nari Nam / Themistocles Leftheris	574	2007/2008 season (100%)	0	0	0	0	0
54	USA	Naomi Nari Nam / Themistocles Leftheris	574	2006/2007 season (70%)	347	227	0	0	0
55	CAN	Maddison Bird / Raymond Schultz	555	2008/2009 season (100%)	422	133	0	0	0
55	CAN	Maddison Bird / Raymond Schultz	555	2007/2008 season (100%)	0	0	0	0	0
55	CAN	Maddison Bird / Raymond Schultz	555	2006/2007 season (70%)	0	0	0	0	0
56	RUS	Ksenia Ozerova / Alexander Enbert	487	2008/2009 season (100%)	0	262	225	0	0
56	RUS	Ksenia Ozerova / Alexander Enbert	487	2007/2008 season (100%)	0	0	0	0	0
56	RUS	Ksenia Ozerova / Alexander Enbert	487	2006/2007 season (70%)	0	0	0	0	0
57	USA	Meeran Trombley / Laureano Ibarra	475	2008/2009 season (100%)	0	213	0	0	0
57	USA	Meeran Trombley / Laureano Ibarra	475	2007/2008 season (100%)	0	262	0	0	0
57	USA	Meeran Trombley / Laureano Ibarra	475	2006/2007 season (70%)	0	0	0	0	0
58	SVK	Gabriela Cermanová / Martin Hanulák	461	2008/2009 season (100%)	147	0	0	182	0
58	SVK	Gabriela Cermanová / Martin Hanulák	461	2007/2008 season (100%)	132	0	0	0	0
58	SVK	Gabriela Cermanová / Martin Hanulák	461	2006/2007 season (70%)	0	0	0	0	0
59	GBR	Erica Risseeuw / Robert Paxton	446	2008/2009 season (100%)	446	0	0	0	0
59	GBR	Erica Risseeuw / Robert Paxton	446	2007/2008 season (100%)	0	0	0	0	0
59	GBR	Erica Risseeuw / Robert Paxton	446	2006/2007 season (70%)	0	0	0	0	0
60	CAN	Rachel Kirkland / Eric Radford	418	2008/2009 season (100%)	0	236	0	0	0
60	CAN	Rachel Kirkland / Eric Radford	418	2007/2008 season (100%)	0	0	0	182	0
60	CAN	Rachel Kirkland / Eric Radford	418	2006/2007 season (70%)	0	0	0	0	0
61	GER	Maylin Hausch / Daniel Wende	402	2008/2009 season (100%)	402	0	0	0	0
61	GER	Maylin Hausch / Daniel Wende	402	2007/2008 season (100%)	0	0	0	0	0
61	GER	Maylin Hausch / Daniel Wende	402	2006/2007 season (70%)	0	0	0	0	0
62	CHN	Duo Cheng / Yu Gao	397	2008/2009 season (100%)	249	148	0	0	0
62	CHN	Duo Cheng / Yu Gao	397	2007/2008 season (100%)	0	0	0	0	0
62	CHN	Duo Cheng / Yu Gao	397	2006/2007 season (70%)	0	0	0	0	0
63	CAN	Christi Anne Steele / Adam Johnson	336	2008/2009 season (100%)	0	108	0	0	0
63	CAN	Christi Anne Steele / Adam Johnson	336	2007/2008 season (100%)	0	120	108	0	0
63	CAN	Christi Anne Steele / Adam Johnson	336	2006/2007 season (70%)	0	0	0	0	0
64	FRA	Camille Foucher / Bruno Massot	301	2008/2009 season (100%)	182	0	0	0	0
64	FRA	Camille Foucher / Bruno Massot	301	2007/2008 season (100%)	119	0	0	0	0
64	FRA	Camille Foucher / Bruno Massot	301	2006/2007 season (70%)	0	0	0	0	0
65	USA	Brittany Chase / Andrew Speroff	241	2008/2009 season (100%)	0	133	108	0	0
65	USA	Brittany Chase / Andrew Speroff	241	2007/2008 season (100%)	0	0	0	0	0
65	USA	Brittany Chase / Andrew Speroff	241	2006/2007 season (70%)	0	0	0	0	0
65	CAN	Zoey Brown / Ian Beharry	241	2008/2009 season (100%)	0	133	108	0	0
65	CAN	Zoey Brown / Ian Beharry	241	2007/2008 season (100%)	0	0	0	0	0
65	CAN	Zoey Brown / Ian Beharry	241	2006/2007 season (70%)	0	0	0	0	0
67	USA	Molly Aaron / Daniyel Cohen	240	2008/2009 season (100%)	0	120	120	0	0
67	USA	Molly Aaron / Daniyel Cohen	240	2007/2008 season (100%)	0	0	0	0	0
67	USA	Molly Aaron / Daniyel Cohen	240	2006/2007 season (70%)	0	0	0	0	0
68	USA	Caitlin Yankowskas / John Coughlin	236	2008/2009 season (100%)	0	236	0	0	0
68	USA	Caitlin Yankowskas / John Coughlin	236	2007/2008 season (100%)	0	0	0	0	0
68	USA	Caitlin Yankowskas / John Coughlin	236	2006/2007 season (70%)	0	0	0	0	0
69	RUS	Lubov Bakirova / Artem Patlasov	231	2008/2009 season (100%)	0	0	0	0	0
69	RUS	Lubov Bakirova / Artem Patlasov	231	2007/2008 season (100%)	0	0	0	0	0
69	RUS	Lubov Bakirova / Artem Patlasov	231	2006/2007 season (70%)	0	127	104	0	0
70	RUS	Tatiana Novik / Konstantin Medovikov	230	2008/2009 season (100%)	0	133	0	0	0
70	RUS	Tatiana Novik / Konstantin Medovikov	230	2007/2008 season (100%)	0	97	0	0	0
70	RUS	Tatiana Novik / Konstantin Medovikov	230	2006/2007 season (70%)	0	0	0	0	0
71	USA	Chloe Katz / Joseph Lynch	225	2008/2009 season (100%)	0	0	0	225	0
71	USA	Chloe Katz / Joseph Lynch	225	2007/2008 season (100%)	0	0	0	0	0
71	USA	Chloe Katz / Joseph Lynch	225	2006/2007 season (70%)	0	0	0	0	0
72	ISR	Hayley Anne Sacks / Vadim Akolzin	222	2008/2009 season (100%)	0	0	0	0	0
72	ISR	Hayley Anne Sacks / Vadim Akolzin	222	2007/2008 season (100%)	222	0	0	0	0
72	ISR	Hayley Anne Sacks / Vadim Akolzin	222	2006/2007 season (70%)	0	0	0	0	0
73	CRO	Amy Ireland / Michael Bahoric	214	2008/2009 season (100%)	0	0	0	0	0
73	CRO	Amy Ireland / Michael Bahoric	214	2007/2008 season (100%)	214	0	0	0	0
73	CRO	Amy Ireland / Michael Bahoric	214	2006/2007 season (70%)	0	0	0	0	0
74	POL	Joanna Sulej / Mateusz Chruscinski	192	2008/2009 season (100%)	192	0	0	0	0
74	POL	Joanna Sulej / Mateusz Chruscinski	192	2007/2008 season (100%)	0	0	0	0	0
74	POL	Joanna Sulej / Mateusz Chruscinski	192	2006/2007 season (70%)	0	0	0	0	0
75	CAN	Valene Maheu / Simon-Pierre Cote	177	2008/2009 season (100%)	0	0	0	0	0
75	CAN	Valene Maheu / Simon-Pierre Cote	177	2007/2008 season (100%)	0	0	0	0	0
75	CAN	Valene Maheu / Simon-Pierre Cote	177	2006/2007 season (70%)	0	93	84	0	0
76	ITA	Carolina Gillespie / Daniel Aggiano	164	2008/2009 season (100%)	164	0	0	0	0
76	ITA	Carolina Gillespie / Daniel Aggiano	164	2007/2008 season (100%)	0	0	0	0	0
76	ITA	Carolina Gillespie / Daniel Aggiano	164	2006/2007 season (70%)	0	0	0	0	0
77	GRE	Jessica Crenshaw / Chad Tsagris	162	2008/2009 season (100%)	162	0	0	0	0
77	GRE	Jessica Crenshaw / Chad Tsagris	162	2007/2008 season (100%)	0	0	0	0	0
77	GRE	Jessica Crenshaw / Chad Tsagris	162	2006/2007 season (70%)	0	0	0	0	0
78	EST	Diana Rennik / Aleksei Saks	150	2008/2009 season (100%)	0	0	0	0	0
78	EST	Diana Rennik / Aleksei Saks	150	2007/2008 season (100%)	0	0	0	0	0
78	EST	Diana Rennik / Aleksei Saks	150	2006/2007 season (70%)	150	0	0	0	0
79	USA	Kloe Bautista / Galvani Hopson	148	2008/2009 season (100%)	0	148	0	0	0
79	USA	Kloe Bautista / Galvani Hopson	148	2007/2008 season (100%)	0	0	0	0	0
79	USA	Kloe Bautista / Galvani Hopson	148	2006/2007 season (70%)	0	0	0	0	0
80	CZE	Alexandra Herbrikova / Lukas Ovcacek	132	2008/2009 season (100%)	132	0	0	0	0
80	CZE	Alexandra Herbrikova / Lukas Ovcacek	132	2007/2008 season (100%)	0	0	0	0	0
80	CZE	Alexandra Herbrikova / Lukas Ovcacek	132	2006/2007 season (70%)	0	0	0	0	0
81	NED	Marylie Jorg / Benjamin Koenderink	119	2008/2009 season (100%)	119	0	0	0	0
81	NED	Marylie Jorg / Benjamin Koenderink	119	2007/2008 season (100%)	0	0	0	0	0
81	NED	Marylie Jorg / Benjamin Koenderink	119	2006/2007 season (70%)	0	0	0	0	0
82	HKG	Rie Aoi / Wen Xiong Guo	107	2008/2009 season (100%)	107	0	0	0	0
82	HKG	Rie Aoi / Wen Xiong Guo	107	2007/2008 season (100%)	0	0	0	0	0
82	HKG	Rie Aoi / Wen Xiong Guo	107	2006/2007 season (70%)	0	0	0	0	0
83	USA	Andrea Best / Trevor Young	104	2008/2009 season (100%)	0	0	0	0	0
83	USA	Andrea Best / Trevor Young	104	2007/2008 season (100%)	0	0	0	0	0
83	USA	Andrea Best / Trevor Young	104	2006/2007 season (70%)	0	104	0	0	0
84	LTU	Agne Oradauskaite / Rudy Halmaert	103	2008/2009 season (100%)	0	0	0	0	0
84	LTU	Agne Oradauskaite / Rudy Halmaert	103	2007/2008 season (100%)	0	0	0	0	0
84	LTU	Agne Oradauskaite / Rudy Halmaert	103	2006/2007 season (70%)	103	0	0	0	0
85	PRK	Ji Hyang Ri / Won Hyok Thae	97	2008/2009 season (100%)	0	97	0	0	0
85	PRK	Ji Hyang Ri / Won Hyok Thae	97	2007/2008 season (100%)	0	0	0	0	0
85	PRK	Ji Hyang Ri / Won Hyok Thae	97	2006/2007 season (70%)	0	0	0	0	0
85	UKR	Anna Khnychenkova / Sergei Kulbach	97	2008/2009 season (100%)	97	0	0	0	0
85	UKR	Anna Khnychenkova / Sergei Kulbach	97	2007/2008 season (100%)	0	0	0	0	0
85	UKR	Anna Khnychenkova / Sergei Kulbach	97	2006/2007 season (70%)	0	0	0	0	0
85	CAN	Kirsten Moore-Towers / Andrew Evans	97	2008/2009 season (100%)	0	97	0	0	0
85	CAN	Kirsten Moore-Towers / Andrew Evans	97	2007/2008 season (100%)	0	0	0	0	0
85	CAN	Kirsten Moore-Towers / Andrew Evans	97	2006/2007 season (70%)	0	0	0	0	0
88	IND	Upasana Upadhyay / Aaron Saladanha	68	2008/2009 season (100%)	0	0	0	0	0
88	IND	Upasana Upadhyay / Aaron Saladanha	68	2007/2008 season (100%)	0	0	0	0	0
88	IND	Upasana Upadhyay / Aaron Saladanha	68	2006/2007 season (70%)	0	68	0	0	0

==== Ice dance (147 couples) ====
As of 28 March 2009

Rank	Nation	Couple	Points	Season	ISU Championships or Olympics	(Junior) Grand Prix and Final		Selected International Competition	
Rank	Nation	Couple	Points	Season	Best	Best	2nd Best	Best	2nd Best
1	RUS	Oksana Domnina / Maxim Shabalin	4589	2008/2009 season (100%)	1200	720	400	0	0
1	RUS	Oksana Domnina / Maxim Shabalin	4589	2007/2008 season (100%)	840	800	400	0	0
1	RUS	Oksana Domnina / Maxim Shabalin	4589	2006/2007 season (70%)	551	454	280	175	0
2	FRA	Isabelle Delobel / Olivier Schoenfelder	4319	2008/2009 season (100%)	0	800	400	0	0
2	FRA	Isabelle Delobel / Olivier Schoenfelder	4319	2007/2008 season (100%)	1200	648	400	250	0
2	FRA	Isabelle Delobel / Olivier Schoenfelder	4319	2006/2007 season (70%)	613	408	252	0	0
3	USA	Tanith Belbin / Benjamin Agosto	3795	2008/2009 season (100%)	1080	360	360	0	0
3	USA	Tanith Belbin / Benjamin Agosto	3795	2007/2008 season (100%)	875	720	400	0	0
3	USA	Tanith Belbin / Benjamin Agosto	3795	2006/2007 season (70%)	680	280	252	0	0
4	CAN	Tessa Virtue / Scott Moir	3491	2008/2009 season (100%)	972	0	0	0	0
4	CAN	Tessa Virtue / Scott Moir	3491	2007/2008 season (100%)	1080	583	400	0	0
4	CAN	Tessa Virtue / Scott Moir	3491	2006/2007 season (70%)	496	252	204	0	0
5	RUS	Jana Khokhlova / Sergei Novitski	3465	2008/2009 season (100%)	840	400	324	0	0
5	RUS	Jana Khokhlova / Sergei Novitski	3465	2007/2008 season (100%)	972	525	360	0	0
5	RUS	Jana Khokhlova / Sergei Novitski	3465	2006/2007 season (70%)	428	368	252	0	0
6	USA	Meryl Davis / Charlie White	3295	2008/2009 season (100%)	875	648	400	0	0
6	USA	Meryl Davis / Charlie White	3295	2007/2008 season (100%)	756	324	292	0	0
6	USA	Meryl Davis / Charlie White	3295	2006/2007 season (70%)	447	204	204	0	0
7	USA	Emily Samuelson / Evan Bates	3179	2008/2009 season (100%)	680	324	292	250	0
7	USA	Emily Samuelson / Evan Bates	3179	2007/2008 season (100%)	715	540	250	0	0
7	USA	Emily Samuelson / Evan Bates	3179	2006/2007 season (70%)	0	378	175	0	0
8	ITA	Federica Faiella / Massimo Scali	3174	2008/2009 season (100%)	756	583	400	0	0
8	ITA	Federica Faiella / Massimo Scali	3174	2007/2008 season (100%)	787	324	324	0	0
8	ITA	Federica Faiella / Massimo Scali	3174	2006/2007 season (70%)	362	227	227	0	0
9	FRA	Nathalie Péchalat / Fabian Bourzat	2941	2008/2009 season (100%)	787	360	324	0	0
9	FRA	Nathalie Péchalat / Fabian Bourzat	2941	2007/2008 season (100%)	638	472	360	0	0
9	FRA	Nathalie Péchalat / Fabian Bourzat	2941	2006/2007 season (70%)	264	227	149	0	0
10	GBR	Sinead Kerr / John Kerr	2881	2008/2009 season (100%)	680	324	324	250	0
10	GBR	Sinead Kerr / John Kerr	2881	2007/2008 season (100%)	574	292	262	0	0
10	GBR	Sinead Kerr / John Kerr	2881	2006/2007 season (70%)	386	204	183	175	0
11	RUS	Kristina Gorshkova / Vitali Butikov	2718	2008/2009 season (100%)	0	292	262	225	203
11	RUS	Kristina Gorshkova / Vitali Butikov	2718	2007/2008 season (100%)	579	486	250	0	0
11	RUS	Kristina Gorshkova / Vitali Butikov	2718	2006/2007 season (70%)	365	306	175	0	0
12	CAN	Vanessa Crone / Paul Poirier	2595	2008/2009 season (100%)	612	360	292	0	0
12	CAN	Vanessa Crone / Paul Poirier	2595	2007/2008 season (100%)	644	437	250	0	0
12	CAN	Vanessa Crone / Paul Poirier	2595	2006/2007 season (70%)	216	142	115	0	0
13	USA	Madison Hubbell / Keiffer Hubbell	2375	2008/2009 season (100%)	521	540	250	0	0
13	USA	Madison Hubbell / Keiffer Hubbell	2375	2007/2008 season (100%)	469	0	0	0	0
13	USA	Madison Hubbell / Keiffer Hubbell	2375	2006/2007 season (70%)	295	420	175	0	0
14	USA	Kimberly Navarro / Brent Bommentre	2288	2008/2009 season (100%)	496	262	236	0	0
14	USA	Kimberly Navarro / Brent Bommentre	2288	2007/2008 season (100%)	680	236	236	0	0
14	USA	Kimberly Navarro / Brent Bommentre	2288	2006/2007 season (70%)	386	165	165	142	0
15	ITA	Anna Cappellini / Luca Lanotte	2252	2008/2009 season (100%)	551	292	292	0	0
15	ITA	Anna Cappellini / Luca Lanotte	2252	2007/2008 season (100%)	465	360	292	0	0
15	ITA	Anna Cappellini / Luca Lanotte	2252	2006/2007 season (70%)	281	183	134	0	0
16	RUS	Ekaterina Riazanova / Jonathan Guerreiro	2249	2008/2009 season (100%)	579	486	250	0	0
16	RUS	Ekaterina Riazanova / Jonathan Guerreiro	2249	2007/2008 season (100%)	422	287	225	0	0
16	RUS	Ekaterina Riazanova / Jonathan Guerreiro	2249	2006/2007 season (70%)	0	76	0	0	0
17	USA	Madison Chock / Greg Zuerlein	2209	2008/2009 season (100%)	715	600	250	0	0
17	USA	Madison Chock / Greg Zuerlein	2209	2007/2008 season (100%)	0	394	250	0	0
17	USA	Madison Chock / Greg Zuerlein	2209	2006/2007 season (70%)	0	0	0	0	0
18	ISR	Alexandra Zaretski / Roman Zaretski	2203	2008/2009 season (100%)	339	262	213	225	0
18	ISR	Alexandra Zaretski / Roman Zaretski	2203	2007/2008 season (100%)	517	292	213	0	0
18	ISR	Alexandra Zaretski / Roman Zaretski	2203	2006/2007 season (70%)	214	204	134	142	0
19	RUS	Ekaterina Bobrova / Dmitri Soloviev	2026	2008/2009 season (100%)	0	292	236	0	0
19	RUS	Ekaterina Bobrova / Dmitri Soloviev	2026	2007/2008 season (100%)	339	292	262	0	0
19	RUS	Ekaterina Bobrova / Dmitri Soloviev	2026	2006/2007 season (70%)	501	340	175	0	0
20	CAN	Kaitlyn Weaver / Andrew Poje	2000	2008/2009 season (100%)	551	236	213	0	0
20	CAN	Kaitlyn Weaver / Andrew Poje	2000	2007/2008 season (100%)	551	236	213	0	0
20	CAN	Kaitlyn Weaver / Andrew Poje	2000	2006/2007 season (70%)	405	142	142	0	0
21	FRA	Pernelle Carron / Matthieu Jost	1989	2008/2009 season (100%)	517	262	262	0	0
21	FRA	Pernelle Carron / Matthieu Jost	1989	2007/2008 season (100%)	362	324	262	0	0
21	FRA	Pernelle Carron / Matthieu Jost	1989	2006/2007 season (70%)	253	183	134	0	0
22	AZE	Kristin Fraser / Igor Lukanin	1864	2008/2009 season (100%)	362	236	0	0	0
22	AZE	Kristin Fraser / Igor Lukanin	1864	2007/2008 season (100%)	418	262	262	0	0
22	AZE	Kristin Fraser / Igor Lukanin	1864	2006/2007 season (70%)	312	149	0	175	0
23	UKR	Anna Zadorozhniuk / Sergei Verbillo	1752	2008/2009 season (100%)	446	262	191	0	0
23	UKR	Anna Zadorozhniuk / Sergei Verbillo	1752	2007/2008 season (100%)	293	324	236	0	0
23	UKR	Anna Zadorozhniuk / Sergei Verbillo	1752	2006/2007 season (70%)	228	165	0	0	0
24	UKR	Alisa Agafonova / Dmitri Dun	1730	2008/2009 season (100%)	202	319	250	0	0
24	UKR	Alisa Agafonova / Dmitri Dun	1730	2007/2008 season (100%)	380	354	225	0	0
24	UKR	Alisa Agafonova / Dmitri Dun	1730	2006/2007 season (70%)	0	158	127	0	0
25	CAN	Kharis Ralph / Asher Hill	1705	2008/2009 season (100%)	469	354	225	0	0
25	CAN	Kharis Ralph / Asher Hill	1705	2007/2008 season (100%)	342	182	133	0	0
25	CAN	Kharis Ralph / Asher Hill	1705	2006/2007 season (70%)	0	0	0	0	0
26	RUS	Maria Monko / Ilia Tkachenko	1699	2008/2009 season (100%)	0	0	0	0	0
26	RUS	Maria Monko / Ilia Tkachenko	1699	2007/2008 season (100%)	521	600	250	0	0
26	RUS	Maria Monko / Ilia Tkachenko	1699	2006/2007 season (70%)	328	0	0	0	0
27	BUL	Albena Denkova / Maxim Staviski	1680	2008/2009 season (100%)	0	0	0	0	0
27	BUL	Albena Denkova / Maxim Staviski	1680	2007/2008 season (100%)	0	0	0	0	0
27	BUL	Albena Denkova / Maxim Staviski	1680	2006/2007 season (70%)	840	560	280	0	0
28	LTU	Katherine Copely / Deividas Stagniūnas	1664	2008/2009 season (100%)	325	236	191	0	0
28	LTU	Katherine Copely / Deividas Stagniūnas	1664	2007/2008 season (100%)	305	262	0	203	0
28	LTU	Katherine Copely / Deividas Stagniūnas	1664	2006/2007 season (70%)	98	0	0	142	0
29	GER	Carolina Hermann / Daniel Hermann	1572	2008/2009 season (100%)	264	0	0	225	225
29	GER	Carolina Hermann / Daniel Hermann	1572	2007/2008 season (100%)	0	191	0	225	164
29	GER	Carolina Hermann / Daniel Hermann	1572	2006/2007 season (70%)	194	84	0	0	0
30	CZE	Lucie Myslivecková / Matej Novák	1561	2008/2009 season (100%)	342	203	182	0	0
30	CZE	Lucie Myslivecková / Matej Novák	1561	2007/2008 season (100%)	224	225	182	203	0
30	CZE	Lucie Myslivecková / Matej Novák	1561	2006/2007 season (70%)	83	0	0	0	0
31	RUS	Ekaterina Rubleva / Ivan Shefer	1530	2008/2009 season (100%)	402	236	213	0	0
31	RUS	Ekaterina Rubleva / Ivan Shefer	1530	2007/2008 season (100%)	275	213	191	0	0
31	RUS	Ekaterina Rubleva / Ivan Shefer	1530	2006/2007 season (70%)	185	0	0	0	0
32	RUS	Ekaterina Pushkash / Dmitri Kiselev	1371	2008/2009 season (100%)	422	394	225	0	0
32	RUS	Ekaterina Pushkash / Dmitri Kiselev	1371	2007/2008 season (100%)	0	182	148	0	0
32	RUS	Ekaterina Pushkash / Dmitri Kiselev	1371	2006/2007 season (70%)	0	93	0	0	0
33	GER	Nelli Zhiganshina / Alexander Gazsi	1370	2008/2009 season (100%)	0	0	0	250	250
33	GER	Nelli Zhiganshina / Alexander Gazsi	1370	2007/2008 season (100%)	162	213	191	164	0
33	GER	Nelli Zhiganshina / Alexander Gazsi	1370	2006/2007 season (70%)	140	0	0	0	0
34	CAN	Karen Routhier / Eric Saucke-Lacelle	1354	2008/2009 season (100%)	380	203	203	0	0
34	CAN	Karen Routhier / Eric Saucke-Lacelle	1354	2007/2008 season (100%)	277	164	120	0	0
34	CAN	Karen Routhier / Eric Saucke-Lacelle	1354	2006/2007 season (70%)	0	127	0	0	0
35	USA	Maia Shibutani / Alex Shibutani	1331	2008/2009 season (100%)	644	437	250	0	0
35	USA	Maia Shibutani / Alex Shibutani	1331	2007/2008 season (100%)	0	0	0	0	0
35	USA	Maia Shibutani / Alex Shibutani	1331	2006/2007 season (70%)	0	0	0	0	0
36	UKR	Alla Beknazarova / Vladimir Zuev	1312	2008/2009 season (100%)	237	0	0	250	0
36	UKR	Alla Beknazarova / Vladimir Zuev	1312	2007/2008 season (100%)	214	0	0	250	203
36	UKR	Alla Beknazarova / Vladimir Zuev	1312	2006/2007 season (70%)	166	0	0	158	0
37	ITA	Isabella Pajardi / Stefano Caruso	1298	2008/2009 season (100%)	173	0	0	164	0
37	ITA	Isabella Pajardi / Stefano Caruso	1298	2007/2008 season (100%)	308	319	250	0	0
37	ITA	Isabella Pajardi / Stefano Caruso	1298	2006/2007 season (70%)	0	84	0	0	0
38	JPN	Cathy Reed / Chris Reed	1267	2008/2009 season (100%)	247	191	0	0	0
38	JPN	Cathy Reed / Chris Reed	1267	2007/2008 season (100%)	446	191	0	0	0
38	JPN	Cathy Reed / Chris Reed	1267	2006/2007 season (70%)	312	0	0	127	0
39	USA	Jennifer Wester / Daniil Barantsev	1266	2008/2009 season (100%)	0	213	191	0	0
39	USA	Jennifer Wester / Daniil Barantsev	1266	2007/2008 season (100%)	612	0	0	250	0
39	USA	Jennifer Wester / Daniil Barantsev	1266	2006/2007 season (70%)	0	0	0	0	0
40	UKR	Nadezhda Frolenkova / Mikhail Kasalo	1051	2008/2009 season (100%)	0	0	0	203	164
40	UKR	Nadezhda Frolenkova / Mikhail Kasalo	1051	2007/2008 season (100%)	0	203	182	0	0
40	UKR	Nadezhda Frolenkova / Mikhail Kasalo	1051	2006/2007 season (70%)	157	142	0	0	0
41	CHN	Xintong Huang / Xun Zheng	1021	2008/2009 season (100%)	446	0	0	0	0
41	CHN	Xintong Huang / Xun Zheng	1021	2007/2008 season (100%)	362	213	0	0	0
41	CHN	Xintong Huang / Xun Zheng	1021	2006/2007 season (70%)	281	0	0	0	0
42	CHN	Xiaoyang Yu / Chen Wang	995	2008/2009 season (100%)	402	191	0	0	0
42	CHN	Xiaoyang Yu / Chen Wang	995	2007/2008 season (100%)	402	0	0	0	0
42	CHN	Xiaoyang Yu / Chen Wang	995	2006/2007 season (70%)	253	0	0	0	0
43	ARM	Anastasia Grebenkina / Vazgen Azrojan	990	2008/2009 season (100%)	0	0	0	0	0
43	ARM	Anastasia Grebenkina / Vazgen Azrojan	990	2007/2008 season (100%)	0	236	236	203	0
43	ARM	Anastasia Grebenkina / Vazgen Azrojan	990	2006/2007 season (70%)	150	165	0	0	0
44	RUS	Marina Antipova / Artem Kudashev	978	2008/2009 season (100%)	249	287	225	0	0
44	RUS	Marina Antipova / Artem Kudashev	978	2007/2008 season (100%)	0	133	0	0	0
44	RUS	Marina Antipova / Artem Kudashev	978	2006/2007 season (70%)	0	84	0	0	0
45	CAN	Allie Hann-McCurdy / Michael Coreno	970	2008/2009 season (100%)	0	0	0	0	0
45	CAN	Allie Hann-McCurdy / Michael Coreno	970	2007/2008 season (100%)	496	292	0	182	0
45	CAN	Allie Hann-McCurdy / Michael Coreno	970	2006/2007 season (70%)	0	0	0	0	0
46	CZE	Kamila Hajkova / David Vincour	969	2008/2009 season (100%)	156	0	0	225	182
46	CZE	Kamila Hajkova / David Vincour	969	2007/2008 season (100%)	156	0	0	250	0
46	CZE	Kamila Hajkova / David Vincour	969	2006/2007 season (70%)	109	0	0	0	0
47	POL	Joanna Budner / Jan Moscicki	959	2008/2009 season (100%)	113	0	0	203	0
47	POL	Joanna Budner / Jan Moscicki	959	2007/2008 season (100%)	126	148	133	0	0
47	POL	Joanna Budner / Jan Moscicki	959	2006/2007 season (70%)	141	115	93	0	0
48	ITA	Lorenza Alessandrini / Simone Vaturi	940	2008/2009 season (100%)	308	203	133	0	0
48	ITA	Lorenza Alessandrini / Simone Vaturi	940	2007/2008 season (100%)	0	148	148	0	0
48	ITA	Lorenza Alessandrini / Simone Vaturi	940	2006/2007 season (70%)	0	0	0	0	0
49	USA	Melissa Gregory / Denis Petukhov	908	2008/2009 season (100%)	0	0	0	0	0
49	USA	Melissa Gregory / Denis Petukhov	908	2007/2008 season (100%)	0	0	0	0	0
49	USA	Melissa Gregory / Denis Petukhov	908	2006/2007 season (70%)	326	330	252	0	0
50	EST	Grethe Grünberg / Kristian Rand	902	2008/2009 season (100%)	0	0	0	0	0
50	EST	Grethe Grünberg / Kristian Rand	902	2007/2008 season (100%)	0	0	0	0	0
50	EST	Grethe Grünberg / Kristian Rand	902	2006/2007 season (70%)	451	276	175	0	0
51	AUT	Barbora Silná / Dmitri Matsjuk	896	2008/2009 season (100%)	192	0	0	0	0
51	AUT	Barbora Silná / Dmitri Matsjuk	896	2007/2008 season (100%)	173	191	0	225	0
51	AUT	Barbora Silná / Dmitri Matsjuk	896	2006/2007 season (70%)	88	0	0	115	0
52	RUS	Julia Zlobina / Alexei Sitnikov	800	2008/2009 season (100%)	0	0	0	164	0
52	RUS	Julia Zlobina / Alexei Sitnikov	800	2007/2008 season (100%)	0	213	0	0	0
52	RUS	Julia Zlobina / Alexei Sitnikov	800	2006/2007 season (70%)	0	248	175	0	0
53	RUS	Ksenia Monko / Kirill Khaliavin	773	2008/2009 season (100%)	0	203	164	0	0
53	RUS	Ksenia Monko / Kirill Khaliavin	773	2007/2008 season (100%)	0	203	203	0	0
53	RUS	Ksenia Monko / Kirill Khaliavin	773	2006/2007 season (70%)	0	0	0	0	0
54	UKR	Anastasia Vykhodtseva / Alexei Shumski	721	2008/2009 season (100%)	0	203	133	0	0
54	UKR	Anastasia Vykhodtseva / Alexei Shumski	721	2007/2008 season (100%)	0	203	182	0	0
54	UKR	Anastasia Vykhodtseva / Alexei Shumski	721	2006/2007 season (70%)	0	84	0	0	0
55	AUS	Danielle O'Brien / Gregory Merriman	718	2008/2009 season (100%)	325	0	0	0	0
55	AUS	Danielle O'Brien / Gregory Merriman	718	2007/2008 season (100%)	325	0	0	0	0
55	AUS	Danielle O'Brien / Gregory Merriman	718	2006/2007 season (70%)	68	68	0	0	0
56	CAN	Joanna Lenko / Mitchell Islam	701	2008/2009 season (100%)	0	0	0	0	0
56	CAN	Joanna Lenko / Mitchell Islam	701	2007/2008 season (100%)	0	225	203	0	0
56	CAN	Joanna Lenko / Mitchell Islam	701	2006/2007 season (70%)	0	158	115	0	0
57	AUS	Maria Borounov / Evgeni Borounov	694	2008/2009 season (100%)	293	0	0	164	0
57	AUS	Maria Borounov / Evgeni Borounov	694	2007/2008 season (100%)	237	0	0	0	0
57	AUS	Maria Borounov / Evgeni Borounov	694	2006/2007 season (70%)	185	0	0	0	0
58	CAN	Tarrah Harvey / Keith Gagnon	690	2008/2009 season (100%)	224	182	164	0	0
58	CAN	Tarrah Harvey / Keith Gagnon	690	2007/2008 season (100%)	0	120	0	0	0
58	CAN	Tarrah Harvey / Keith Gagnon	690	2006/2007 season (70%)	0	0	0	0	0
59	RUS	Anastasia Platonova / Alexander Grachev	688	2008/2009 season (100%)	0	213	0	250	225
59	RUS	Anastasia Platonova / Alexander Grachev	688	2007/2008 season (100%)	0	0	0	0	0
59	RUS	Anastasia Platonova / Alexander Grachev	688	2006/2007 season (70%)	0	0	0	0	0
60	FRA	Terra Findlay / Benoit Richaud	662	2008/2009 season (100%)	277	203	182	0	0
60	FRA	Terra Findlay / Benoit Richaud	662	2007/2008 season (100%)	0	0	0	0	0
60	FRA	Terra Findlay / Benoit Richaud	662	2006/2007 season (70%)	0	0	0	0	0
61	USA	Isabella Cannuscio / Ian Lorello	648	2008/2009 season (100%)	0	182	164	0	0
61	USA	Isabella Cannuscio / Ian Lorello	648	2007/2008 season (100%)	0	182	120	0	0
61	USA	Isabella Cannuscio / Ian Lorello	648	2006/2007 season (70%)	0	0	0	0	0
62	USA	Rachel Tibbetts / Collin Brubaker	640	2008/2009 season (100%)	0	164	148	0	0
62	USA	Rachel Tibbetts / Collin Brubaker	640	2007/2008 season (100%)	0	164	164	0	0
62	USA	Rachel Tibbetts / Collin Brubaker	640	2006/2007 season (70%)	0	0	0	0	0
63	RUS	Elizaveta Tchetinkina / Denis Smirnov	624	2008/2009 season (100%)	0	164	148	0	0
63	RUS	Elizaveta Tchetinkina / Denis Smirnov	624	2007/2008 season (100%)	0	164	148	0	0
63	RUS	Elizaveta Tchetinkina / Denis Smirnov	624	2006/2007 season (70%)	0	0	0	0	0
64	FRA	Charlene Guignard / Guillaume Paulmier	618	2008/2009 season (100%)	107	120	0	0	0
64	FRA	Charlene Guignard / Guillaume Paulmier	618	2007/2008 season (100%)	119	164	108	0	0
64	FRA	Charlene Guignard / Guillaume Paulmier	618	2006/2007 season (70%)	0	0	0	0	0
65	GER	Tanja Kolbe / Sascha Rabe	565	2008/2009 season (100%)	0	0	0	164	0
65	GER	Tanja Kolbe / Sascha Rabe	565	2007/2008 season (100%)	0	0	0	182	0
65	GER	Tanja Kolbe / Sascha Rabe	565	2006/2007 season (70%)	0	115	104	0	0
66	HUN	Krisztina Barta / Adam Toth	550	2008/2009 season (100%)	0	0	0	0	0
66	HUN	Krisztina Barta / Adam Toth	550	2007/2008 season (100%)	102	0	0	164	0
66	HUN	Krisztina Barta / Adam Toth	550	2006/2007 season (70%)	115	93	76	0	0
67	FRA	Zoe Blanc / Pierre-Loup Bouquet	543	2008/2009 season (100%)	180	0	0	0	0
67	FRA	Zoe Blanc / Pierre-Loup Bouquet	543	2007/2008 season (100%)	0	191	0	0	0
67	FRA	Zoe Blanc / Pierre-Loup Bouquet	543	2006/2007 season (70%)	0	104	68	0	0
68	USA	Piper Gilles / Zachary Donohue	475	2008/2009 season (100%)	0	250	225	0	0
68	USA	Piper Gilles / Zachary Donohue	475	2007/2008 season (100%)	0	0	0	0	0
68	USA	Piper Gilles / Zachary Donohue	475	2006/2007 season (70%)	0	0	0	0	0
69	GEO	Isabella Tobias / Otar Japaridze	463	2008/2009 season (100%)	0	0	0	0	0
69	GEO	Isabella Tobias / Otar Japaridze	463	2007/2008 season (100%)	182	148	133	0	0
69	GEO	Isabella Tobias / Otar Japaridze	463	2006/2007 season (70%)	0	0	0	0	0
69	USA	Sara Bailey / Kyle Herring	463	2008/2009 season (100%)	0	182	148	0	0
69	USA	Sara Bailey / Kyle Herring	463	2007/2008 season (100%)	0	133	0	0	0
69	USA	Sara Bailey / Kyle Herring	463	2006/2007 season (70%)	0	0	0	0	0
71	UKR	Alina Saprikina / Pavel Khimich	436	2008/2009 season (100%)	0	0	0	182	0
71	UKR	Alina Saprikina / Pavel Khimich	436	2007/2008 season (100%)	0	0	0	0	0
71	UKR	Alina Saprikina / Pavel Khimich	436	2006/2007 season (70%)	0	127	127	0	0
72	RUS	Tatiana Baturintseva / Ivan Volobuiev	430	2008/2009 season (100%)	0	164	133	0	0
72	RUS	Tatiana Baturintseva / Ivan Volobuiev	430	2007/2008 season (100%)	0	133	0	0	0
72	RUS	Tatiana Baturintseva / Ivan Volobuiev	430	2006/2007 season (70%)	0	0	0	0	0
73	HUN	Emese Laszlo / Mate Fejes	422	2008/2009 season (100%)	0	120	97	0	0
73	HUN	Emese Laszlo / Mate Fejes	422	2007/2008 season (100%)	97	108	0	0	0
73	HUN	Emese Laszlo / Mate Fejes	422	2006/2007 season (70%)	0	0	0	0	0
74	USA	Jane Summersett / Todd Gilles	416	2008/2009 season (100%)	0	213	0	203	0
74	USA	Jane Summersett / Todd Gilles	416	2007/2008 season (100%)	0	0	0	0	0
74	USA	Jane Summersett / Todd Gilles	416	2006/2007 season (70%)	0	0	0	0	0
75	EST	Caitlin Mallory / Kristian Rand	396	2008/2009 season (100%)	214	0	0	182	0
75	EST	Caitlin Mallory / Kristian Rand	396	2007/2008 season (100%)	0	0	0	0	0
75	EST	Caitlin Mallory / Kristian Rand	396	2006/2007 season (70%)	0	0	0	0	0
76	GER	Ashley Foy / Benjamin Blum	390	2008/2009 season (100%)	0	0	0	0	0
76	GER	Ashley Foy / Benjamin Blum	390	2007/2008 season (100%)	202	120	0	0	0
76	GER	Ashley Foy / Benjamin Blum	390	2006/2007 season (70%)	0	68	0	0	0
77	SVK	Nikola Visnova / Lukáš Csölley	384	2008/2009 season (100%)	132	0	0	0	0
77	SVK	Nikola Visnova / Lukáš Csölley	384	2007/2008 season (100%)	132	120	0	0	0
77	SVK	Nikola Visnova / Lukáš Csölley	384	2006/2007 season (70%)	75	0	0	0	0
78	CAN	Andrea Chong / Guillame Gfeller	373	2008/2009 season (100%)	0	191	0	182	0
78	CAN	Andrea Chong / Guillame Gfeller	373	2007/2008 season (100%)	0	0	0	0	0
78	CAN	Andrea Chong / Guillame Gfeller	373	2006/2007 season (70%)	0	0	0	0	0
79	CHN	Jiayue Wang / Chongbo Gao	362	2008/2009 season (100%)	362	0	0	0	0
79	CHN	Jiayue Wang / Chongbo Gao	362	2007/2008 season (100%)	0	0	0	0	0
79	CHN	Jiayue Wang / Chongbo Gao	362	2006/2007 season (70%)	0	0	0	0	0
80	GRE	Nikki Georgiadis / Graham Hockley	358	2008/2009 season (100%)	164	97	97	0	0
80	GRE	Nikki Georgiadis / Graham Hockley	358	2007/2008 season (100%)	0	0	0	0	0
80	GRE	Nikki Georgiadis / Graham Hockley	358	2006/2007 season (70%)	0	0	0	0	0
81	BLR	Ksenia Shmirina / Yahor Maistrov	357	2008/2009 season (100%)	83	0	0	182	0
81	BLR	Ksenia Shmirina / Yahor Maistrov	357	2007/2008 season (100%)	92	0	0	0	0
81	BLR	Ksenia Shmirina / Yahor Maistrov	357	2006/2007 season (70%)	0	0	0	0	0
82	GBR	Christina Chitwood / Mark Hanretty	343	2008/2009 season (100%)	140	0	0	203	0
82	GBR	Christina Chitwood / Mark Hanretty	343	2007/2008 season (100%)	0	0	0	0	0
82	GBR	Christina Chitwood / Mark Hanretty	343	2006/2007 season (70%)	0	0	0	0	0
83	RUS	Natalia Mikhailova / Arkadi Sergeev	337	2008/2009 season (100%)	0	0	0	203	0
83	RUS	Natalia Mikhailova / Arkadi Sergeev	337	2007/2008 season (100%)	0	0	0	0	0
83	RUS	Natalia Mikhailova / Arkadi Sergeev	337	2006/2007 season (70%)	0	134	0	0	0
84	CAN	Alexandra Paul / Jason Cheperdak	330	2008/2009 season (100%)	0	182	148	0	0
84	CAN	Alexandra Paul / Jason Cheperdak	330	2007/2008 season (100%)	0	0	0	0	0
84	CAN	Alexandra Paul / Jason Cheperdak	330	2006/2007 season (70%)	0	0	0	0	0
85	EST	Irina Shtork / Taavi Rand	327	2008/2009 season (100%)	0	0	0	0	0
85	EST	Irina Shtork / Taavi Rand	327	2007/2008 season (100%)	78	97	97	0	0
85	EST	Irina Shtork / Taavi Rand	327	2006/2007 season (70%)	55	0	0	0	0
86	RUS	Valeria Zenkova / Valerie Sinitsin	323	2008/2009 season (100%)	0	203	120	0	0
86	RUS	Valeria Zenkova / Valerie Sinitsin	323	2007/2008 season (100%)	0	0	0	0	0
86	RUS	Valeria Zenkova / Valerie Sinitsin	323	2006/2007 season (70%)	0	0	0	0	0
86	GEO	Ekaterina Zaikina / Otar Japaridze	323	2008/2009 season (100%)	0	0	0	0	0
86	GEO	Ekaterina Zaikina / Otar Japaridze	323	2007/2008 season (100%)	0	0	0	0	0
86	GEO	Ekaterina Zaikina / Otar Japaridze	323	2006/2007 season (70%)	103	127	93	0	0
88	HUN	Dora Turoczi / Balazs Major	315	2008/2009 season (100%)	87	120	0	0	0
88	HUN	Dora Turoczi / Balazs Major	315	2007/2008 season (100%)	0	108	0	0	0
88	HUN	Dora Turoczi / Balazs Major	315	2006/2007 season (70%)	0	0	0	0	0
89	FIN	Oksana Klimova / Sasha Palomäki	295	2008/2009 season (100%)	92	133	0	0	0
89	FIN	Oksana Klimova / Sasha Palomäki	295	2007/2008 season (100%)	70	0	0	0	0
89	FIN	Oksana Klimova / Sasha Palomäki	295	2006/2007 season (70%)	0	0	0	0	0
90	CHN	Jiameimei Guo / Fei Meng	293	2008/2009 season (100%)	0	0	0	0	0
90	CHN	Jiameimei Guo / Fei Meng	293	2007/2008 season (100%)	293	0	0	0	0
90	CHN	Jiameimei Guo / Fei Meng	293	2006/2007 season (70%)	0	0	0	0	0
91	CHN	Xueting Guan / Meng Wang	289	2008/2009 season (100%)	182	0	0	0	0
91	CHN	Xueting Guan / Meng Wang	289	2007/2008 season (100%)	107	0	0	0	0
91	CHN	Xueting Guan / Meng Wang	289	2006/2007 season (70%)	0	0	0	0	0
92	UKR	Anastasia Galyeta / Semen Kaplun	284	2008/2009 season (100%)	0	164	0	0	0
92	UKR	Anastasia Galyeta / Semen Kaplun	284	2007/2008 season (100%)	0	120	0	0	0
92	UKR	Anastasia Galyeta / Semen Kaplun	284	2006/2007 season (70%)	0	0	0	0	0
93	RUS	Ksenia Antonova / Roman Mylnikov	269	2008/2009 season (100%)	0	0	0	0	0
93	RUS	Ksenia Antonova / Roman Mylnikov	269	2007/2008 season (100%)	0	0	0	0	0
93	RUS	Ksenia Antonova / Roman Mylnikov	269	2006/2007 season (70%)	0	142	127	0	0
94	UZB	Sun Hye Yu / Ramil Sarkulov	264	2008/2009 season (100%)	0	0	0	0	0
94	UZB	Sun Hye Yu / Ramil Sarkulov	264	2007/2008 season (100%)	264	0	0	0	0
94	UZB	Sun Hye Yu / Ramil Sarkulov	264	2006/2007 season (70%)	0	0	0	0	0
95	GBR	Phillipa Towler-Green / Phillip Poole	258	2008/2009 season (100%)	118	0	0	0	0
95	GBR	Phillipa Towler-Green / Phillip Poole	258	2007/2008 season (100%)	140	0	0	0	0
95	GBR	Phillipa Towler-Green / Phillip Poole	258	2006/2007 season (70%)	58	0	0	0	0
96	UKR	Siobhan Heekin-Canedy / Dmitri Zyzak	256	2008/2009 season (100%)	0	148	108	0	0
96	UKR	Siobhan Heekin-Canedy / Dmitri Zyzak	256	2007/2008 season (100%)	0	0	0	0	0
96	UKR	Siobhan Heekin-Canedy / Dmitri Zyzak	256	2006/2007 season (70%)	0	0	0	0	0
97	POL	Anastasia Gavrylovych / Maciej Bernadowski	244	2008/2009 season (100%)	0	0	0	0	0
97	POL	Anastasia Gavrylovych / Maciej Bernadowski	244	2007/2008 season (100%)	147	97	0	0	0
97	POL	Anastasia Gavrylovych / Maciej Bernadowski	244	2006/2007 season (70%)	0	0	0	0	0
98	UKR	Olga Oksenich / Oleg Tazetdinov	231	2008/2009 season (100%)	0	0	0	0	0
98	UKR	Olga Oksenich / Oleg Tazetdinov	231	2007/2008 season (100%)	0	0	0	0	0
98	UKR	Olga Oksenich / Oleg Tazetdinov	231	2006/2007 season (70%)	0	127	104	0	0
99	UZB	Olga Akimova / Alexander Shakalov	228	2008/2009 season (100%)	0	0	0	0	0
99	UZB	Olga Akimova / Alexander Shakalov	228	2007/2008 season (100%)	0	0	0	0	0
99	UZB	Olga Akimova / Alexander Shakalov	228	2006/2007 season (70%)	228	0	0	0	0
100	RUS	Natalia Mikhailova / Andrei Maximishin	225	2008/2009 season (100%)	0	0	0	0	0
100	RUS	Natalia Mikhailova / Andrei Maximishin	225	2007/2008 season (100%)	0	0	0	225	0
100	RUS	Natalia Mikhailova / Andrei Maximishin	225	2006/2007 season (70%)	0	0	0	0	0
101	CZE	Karolina Prochazkova / Michal Ceska	217	2008/2009 season (100%)	0	120	97	0	0
101	CZE	Karolina Prochazkova / Michal Ceska	217	2007/2008 season (100%)	0	0	0	0	0
101	CZE	Karolina Prochazkova / Michal Ceska	217	2006/2007 season (70%)	0	0	0	0	0
102	UZB	Maria Popkova / Viktor Kovalenko	216	2008/2009 season (100%)	0	108	108	0	0
102	UZB	Maria Popkova / Viktor Kovalenko	216	2007/2008 season (100%)	0	0	0	0	0
102	UZB	Maria Popkova / Viktor Kovalenko	216	2006/2007 season (70%)	0	0	0	0	0
103	SUI	Leonie Krail / Oscar Peter	215	2008/2009 season (100%)	102	0	0	0	0
103	SUI	Leonie Krail / Oscar Peter	215	2007/2008 season (100%)	113	0	0	0	0
103	SUI	Leonie Krail / Oscar Peter	215	2006/2007 season (70%)	0	0	0	0	0
104	CAN	Maja Vermeulen / Andrew Doleman	205	2008/2009 season (100%)	0	97	0	0	0
104	CAN	Maja Vermeulen / Andrew Doleman	205	2007/2008 season (100%)	0	108	0	0	0
104	CAN	Maja Vermeulen / Andrew Doleman	205	2006/2007 season (70%)	0	0	0	0	0
104	MEX	Laura Munana / Luke Munana	205	2008/2009 season (100%)	0	0	0	0	0
104	MEX	Laura Munana / Luke Munana	205	2007/2008 season (100%)	0	0	0	0	0
104	MEX	Laura Munana / Luke Munana	205	2006/2007 season (70%)	205	0	0	0	0
106	CAN	Siobhan Karam / Kevin O'Keefe	182	2008/2009 season (100%)	0	0	0	0	0
106	CAN	Siobhan Karam / Kevin O'Keefe	182	2007/2008 season (100%)	0	0	0	182	0
106	CAN	Siobhan Karam / Kevin O'Keefe	182	2006/2007 season (70%)	0	0	0	0	0
107	USA	Lynn Kriengkrairut / Logan Giulietti-Schmitt	174	2008/2009 season (100%)	0	0	0	0	0
107	USA	Lynn Kriengkrairut / Logan Giulietti-Schmitt	174	2007/2008 season (100%)	0	0	0	0	0
107	USA	Lynn Kriengkrairut / Logan Giulietti-Schmitt	174	2006/2007 season (70%)	174	0	0	0	0
108	GBR	Leigh Rogers / Lloyd Jones	168	2008/2009 season (100%)	0	0	0	0	0
108	GBR	Leigh Rogers / Lloyd Jones	168	2007/2008 season (100%)	0	0	0	0	0
108	GBR	Leigh Rogers / Lloyd Jones	168	2006/2007 season (70%)	92	76	0	0	0
109	SUI	Solene Pasztory / David Defazio	164	2008/2009 season (100%)	0	0	0	164	0
109	SUI	Solene Pasztory / David Defazio	164	2007/2008 season (100%)	0	0	0	0	0
109	SUI	Solene Pasztory / David Defazio	164	2006/2007 season (70%)	0	0	0	0	0
109	ITA	Natalia Mitiushina / Matteo Zanni	164	2008/2009 season (100%)	0	0	0	0	0
109	ITA	Natalia Mitiushina / Matteo Zanni	164	2007/2008 season (100%)	164	0	0	0	0
109	ITA	Natalia Mitiushina / Matteo Zanni	164	2006/2007 season (70%)	0	0	0	0	0
109	RUS	Angelina Telegina / Viktor Adoniev	164	2008/2009 season (100%)	0	164	0	0	0
109	RUS	Angelina Telegina / Viktor Adoniev	164	2007/2008 season (100%)	0	0	0	0	0
109	RUS	Angelina Telegina / Viktor Adoniev	164	2006/2007 season (70%)	0	0	0	0	0
112	HUN	Dorina Molnar / Gabor Balint	160	2008/2009 season (100%)	0	0	0	0	0
112	HUN	Dorina Molnar / Gabor Balint	160	2007/2008 season (100%)	0	0	0	0	0
112	HUN	Dorina Molnar / Gabor Balint	160	2006/2007 season (70%)	0	84	76	0	0
113	UKR	Ruslana Jurchenko / Alexander Liubchenko	148	2008/2009 season (100%)	0	148	0	0	0
113	UKR	Ruslana Jurchenko / Alexander Liubchenko	148	2007/2008 season (100%)	0	0	0	0	0
113	UKR	Ruslana Jurchenko / Alexander Liubchenko	148	2006/2007 season (70%)	0	0	0	0	0
113	CAN	Olivia Nicole Martins / Alvin Chau	148	2008/2009 season (100%)	0	148	0	0	0
113	CAN	Olivia Nicole Martins / Alvin Chau	148	2007/2008 season (100%)	0	0	0	0	0
113	CAN	Olivia Nicole Martins / Alvin Chau	148	2006/2007 season (70%)	0	0	0	0	0
113	RUS	Victoria Sinitsina / Ruslan Zhiganshin	148	2008/2009 season (100%)	0	148	0	0	0
113	RUS	Victoria Sinitsina / Ruslan Zhiganshin	148	2007/2008 season (100%)	0	0	0	0	0
113	RUS	Victoria Sinitsina / Ruslan Zhiganshin	148	2006/2007 season (70%)	0	0	0	0	0
116	AUT	Sonja Pauli / Tobias Eisenbauer	147	2008/2009 season (100%)	147	0	0	0	0
116	AUT	Sonja Pauli / Tobias Eisenbauer	147	2007/2008 season (100%)	0	0	0	0	0
116	AUT	Sonja Pauli / Tobias Eisenbauer	147	2006/2007 season (70%)	0	0	0	0	0
117	USA	Shannon Wingle / Timothy McKernan	133	2008/2009 season (100%)	0	133	0	0	0
117	USA	Shannon Wingle / Timothy McKernan	133	2007/2008 season (100%)	0	0	0	0	0
117	USA	Shannon Wingle / Timothy McKernan	133	2006/2007 season (70%)	0	0	0	0	0
117	CAN	Veronique De Beaumont-Boisvert / Sebastien Buron	133	2008/2009 season (100%)	0	133	0	0	0
117	CAN	Veronique De Beaumont-Boisvert / Sebastien Buron	133	2007/2008 season (100%)	0	0	0	0	0
117	CAN	Veronique De Beaumont-Boisvert / Sebastien Buron	133	2006/2007 season (70%)	0	0	0	0	0
117	CAN	Sophie Knippel / Andrew Britten	133	2008/2009 season (100%)	0	133	0	0	0
117	CAN	Sophie Knippel / Andrew Britten	133	2007/2008 season (100%)	0	0	0	0	0
117	CAN	Sophie Knippel / Andrew Britten	133	2006/2007 season (70%)	0	0	0	0	0
117	CAN	Catherine St. Onge / Alexander Brown	133	2008/2009 season (100%)	0	133	0	0	0
117	CAN	Catherine St. Onge / Alexander Brown	133	2007/2008 season (100%)	0	0	0	0	0
117	CAN	Catherine St. Onge / Alexander Brown	133	2006/2007 season (70%)	0	0	0	0	0
121	POL	Alexandra Kauc / Michal Zych	127	2008/2009 season (100%)	0	0	0	0	0
121	POL	Alexandra Kauc / Michal Zych	127	2007/2008 season (100%)	0	0	0	0	0
121	POL	Alexandra Kauc / Michal Zych	127	2006/2007 season (70%)	0	0	0	127	0
122	GER	Juliane Haslinger / Tom Finke	120	2008/2009 season (100%)	0	120	0	0	0
122	GER	Juliane Haslinger / Tom Finke	120	2007/2008 season (100%)	0	0	0	0	0
122	GER	Juliane Haslinger / Tom Finke	120	2006/2007 season (70%)	0	0	0	0	0
122	FRA	Rowan Musson / Neil Brown	120	2008/2009 season (100%)	0	120	0	0	0
122	FRA	Rowan Musson / Neil Brown	120	2007/2008 season (100%)	0	0	0	0	0
122	FRA	Rowan Musson / Neil Brown	120	2006/2007 season (70%)	0	0	0	0	0
122	UKR	Maria Nosulia / Evgen Kholoniuk	120	2008/2009 season (100%)	0	120	0	0	0
122	UKR	Maria Nosulia / Evgen Kholoniuk	120	2007/2008 season (100%)	0	0	0	0	0
122	UKR	Maria Nosulia / Evgen Kholoniuk	120	2006/2007 season (70%)	0	0	0	0	0
125	GBR	Genevieve Deutch / Evan Roberts	119	2008/2009 season (100%)	119	0	0	0	0
125	GBR	Genevieve Deutch / Evan Roberts	119	2007/2008 season (100%)	0	0	0	0	0
125	GBR	Genevieve Deutch / Evan Roberts	119	2006/2007 season (70%)	0	0	0	0	0
126	GBR	Kira Geil / Andrew Smykowski	115	2008/2009 season (100%)	0	0	0	0	0
126	GBR	Kira Geil / Andrew Smykowski	115	2007/2008 season (100%)	0	0	0	0	0
126	GBR	Kira Geil / Andrew Smykowski	115	2006/2007 season (70%)	0	0	0	115	0
126	CAN	Brooklyn Vienneau / Jonathan Cluett	115	2008/2009 season (100%)	0	0	0	0	0
126	CAN	Brooklyn Vienneau / Jonathan Cluett	115	2007/2008 season (100%)	0	0	0	0	0
126	CAN	Brooklyn Vienneau / Jonathan Cluett	115	2006/2007 season (70%)	0	115	0	0	0
128	UKR	Elena Teremtsova / Yuri Eremenko	108	2008/2009 season (100%)	0	108	0	0	0
128	UKR	Elena Teremtsova / Yuri Eremenko	108	2007/2008 season (100%)	0	0	0	0	0
128	UKR	Elena Teremtsova / Yuri Eremenko	108	2006/2007 season (70%)	0	0	0	0	0
128	CAN	Abby Carswell / Jason Cusmariu	108	2008/2009 season (100%)	0	108	0	0	0
128	CAN	Abby Carswell / Jason Cusmariu	108	2007/2008 season (100%)	0	0	0	0	0
128	CAN	Abby Carswell / Jason Cusmariu	108	2006/2007 season (70%)	0	0	0	0	0
128	ESP	Sara Hurtado / Adria Diaz	108	2008/2009 season (100%)	0	108	0	0	0
128	ESP	Sara Hurtado / Adria Diaz	108	2007/2008 season (100%)	0	0	0	0	0
128	ESP	Sara Hurtado / Adria Diaz	108	2006/2007 season (70%)	0	0	0	0	0
128	USA	Chloe Wolf / Rhys Ainsworth	108	2008/2009 season (100%)	0	108	0	0	0
128	USA	Chloe Wolf / Rhys Ainsworth	108	2007/2008 season (100%)	0	0	0	0	0
128	USA	Chloe Wolf / Rhys Ainsworth	108	2006/2007 season (70%)	0	0	0	0	0
128	UKR	Xenia Chepizhko / Sergei Shevchenko	108	2008/2009 season (100%)	0	108	0	0	0
128	UKR	Xenia Chepizhko / Sergei Shevchenko	108	2007/2008 season (100%)	0	0	0	0	0
128	UKR	Xenia Chepizhko / Sergei Shevchenko	108	2006/2007 season (70%)	0	0	0	0	0
128	CAN	Krista Wolfenden / Justin Trojek	108	2008/2009 season (100%)	0	0	0	0	0
128	CAN	Krista Wolfenden / Justin Trojek	108	2007/2008 season (100%)	0	108	0	0	0
128	CAN	Krista Wolfenden / Justin Trojek	108	2006/2007 season (70%)	0	0	0	0	0
134	GER	Ekaterina Zabolotnaya / Julian Wagner	97	2008/2009 season (100%)	0	0	0	0	0
134	GER	Ekaterina Zabolotnaya / Julian Wagner	97	2007/2008 season (100%)	0	97	0	0	0
134	GER	Ekaterina Zabolotnaya / Julian Wagner	97	2006/2007 season (70%)	0	0	0	0	0
134	GBR	Penny Coomes / Nicholas Buckland	97	2008/2009 season (100%)	0	0	0	0	0
134	GBR	Penny Coomes / Nicholas Buckland	97	2007/2008 season (100%)	0	97	0	0	0
134	GBR	Penny Coomes / Nicholas Buckland	97	2006/2007 season (70%)	0	0	0	0	0
134	ITA	Paola Amati / Marco Fabbri	97	2008/2009 season (100%)	97	0	0	0	0
134	ITA	Paola Amati / Marco Fabbri	97	2007/2008 season (100%)	0	0	0	0	0
134	ITA	Paola Amati / Marco Fabbri	97	2006/2007 season (70%)	0	0	0	0	0
134	BLR	Lesia Valadzenkava / Vitali Vakunov	97	2008/2009 season (100%)	0	97	0	0	0
134	BLR	Lesia Valadzenkava / Vitali Vakunov	97	2007/2008 season (100%)	0	0	0	0	0
134	BLR	Lesia Valadzenkava / Vitali Vakunov	97	2006/2007 season (70%)	0	0	0	0	0
134	UKR	Elena Chigidina / Vitali Nikiforov	97	2008/2009 season (100%)	0	0	0	0	0
134	UKR	Elena Chigidina / Vitali Nikiforov	97	2007/2008 season (100%)	0	97	0	0	0
134	UKR	Elena Chigidina / Vitali Nikiforov	97	2006/2007 season (70%)	0	0	0	0	0
139	CAN	Christina Bourgeois / Frederick Allain	93	2008/2009 season (100%)	0	0	0	0	0
139	CAN	Christina Bourgeois / Frederick Allain	93	2007/2008 season (100%)	0	0	0	0	0
139	CAN	Christina Bourgeois / Frederick Allain	93	2006/2007 season (70%)	0	93	0	0	0
140	USA	Lindsay Cohen / Evan Roberts	84	2008/2009 season (100%)	0	0	0	0	0
140	USA	Lindsay Cohen / Evan Roberts	84	2007/2008 season (100%)	0	0	0	0	0
140	USA	Lindsay Cohen / Evan Roberts	84	2006/2007 season (70%)	0	84	0	0	0
141	EST	Kristina Kiudmaa / Aleksei Trohlev	83	2008/2009 season (100%)	0	0	0	0	0
141	EST	Kristina Kiudmaa / Aleksei Trohlev	83	2007/2008 season (100%)	83	0	0	0	0
141	EST	Kristina Kiudmaa / Aleksei Trohlev	83	2006/2007 season (70%)	0	0	0	0	0
142	GER	Dominique Dieck / Michael Zenkner	78	2008/2009 season (100%)	78	0	0	0	0
142	GER	Dominique Dieck / Michael Zenkner	78	2007/2008 season (100%)	0	0	0	0	0
142	GER	Dominique Dieck / Michael Zenkner	78	2006/2007 season (70%)	0	0	0	0	0
143	UKR	Anastasia Galyeta / Alexei Shumski	70	2008/2009 season (100%)	70	0	0	0	0
143	UKR	Anastasia Galyeta / Alexei Shumski	70	2007/2008 season (100%)	0	0	0	0	0
143	UKR	Anastasia Galyeta / Alexei Shumski	70	2006/2007 season (70%)	0	0	0	0	0
144	CAN	Sabryna Rettino / Dominique Dupuis	68	2008/2009 season (100%)	0	0	0	0	0
144	CAN	Sabryna Rettino / Dominique Dupuis	68	2007/2008 season (100%)	0	0	0	0	0
144	CAN	Sabryna Rettino / Dominique Dupuis	68	2006/2007 season (70%)	0	68	0	0	0
145	SUI	Nora Von Bergen / David Defazio	64	2008/2009 season (100%)	0	0	0	0	0
145	SUI	Nora Von Bergen / David Defazio	64	2007/2008 season (100%)	0	0	0	0	0
145	SUI	Nora Von Bergen / David Defazio	64	2006/2007 season (70%)	64	0	0	0	0
146	BUL	Ina Demireva / Juri Kurakin	63	2008/2009 season (100%)	0	0	0	0	0
146	BUL	Ina Demireva / Juri Kurakin	63	2007/2008 season (100%)	63	0	0	0	0
146	BUL	Ina Demireva / Juri Kurakin	63	2006/2007 season (70%)	0	0	0	0	0
147	SUI	Ramona Elsener / Florian Roost	61	2008/2009 season (100%)	0	0	0	0	0
147	SUI	Ramona Elsener / Florian Roost	61	2007/2008 season (100%)	0	0	0	0	0
147	SUI	Ramona Elsener / Florian Roost	61	2006/2007 season (70%)	61	0	0	0	0

== See also ==
- ISU World Standings
- 2008–09 figure skating season
