= 2009–10 ISU World Standings =

Merit-based ice skating ranking

Season-end No. 1 skaters
- Men's singles: (United States) Evan Lysacek
- Ladies' singles: (South Korea) Yuna Kim
- Pairs: (Germany) Aliona Savchenko / Robin Szolkowy
- Ice dance: (United States) Meryl Davis / Charlie White

Navigation

The 2009–10 ISU World Standings are the World Standings published by the International Skating Union (ISU) during the 2009–10 season.

The 2009–10 ISU World Standings for single & pair skating and ice dance, are taking into account results of the 2007–08, 2008–09 and 2009–10 seasons.

== World Standings for single & pair skating and ice dance ==
=== Season-end standings ===
The remainder of this section is a complete list, by discipline, published by the ISU.

==== Men's singles (177 skaters) ====
As of 25 March 2010

Rank	Nation	Skater	Points	Season	ISU Championships or Olympics	(Junior) Grand Prix and Final		Selected International Competition	
Rank	Nation	Skater	Points	Season	Best	Best	2nd Best	Best	2nd Best
1	USA	Evan Lysacek	4378	2009/2010 season (100%)	1200	800	400	0	0
1	USA	Evan Lysacek	4378	2008/2009 season (100%)	1200	324	324	0	0
1	USA	Evan Lysacek	4378	2007/2008 season (70%)	476	454	252	0	0
2	CZE	Tomáš Verner	4048	2009/2010 season (100%)	325	472	360	250	0
2	CZE	Tomáš Verner	4048	2008/2009 season (100%)	875	583	360	203	182
2	CZE	Tomáš Verner	4048	2007/2008 season (70%)	588	252	165	175	142
3	CAN	Patrick Chan	3733	2009/2010 season (100%)	1080	236	0	0	0
3	CAN	Patrick Chan	3733	2008/2009 season (100%)	1080	525	400	0	0
3	CAN	Patrick Chan	3733	2007/2008 season (70%)	362	368	280	0	0
4	JPN	Daisuke Takahashi	3732	2009/2010 season (100%)	1200	525	360	250	0
4	JPN	Daisuke Takahashi	3732	2008/2009 season (100%)	0	0	0	0	0
4	JPN	Daisuke Takahashi	3732	2007/2008 season (70%)	613	504	280	0	0
5	USA	Jeremy Abbott	3521	2009/2010 season (100%)	787	583	400	0	0
5	USA	Jeremy Abbott	3521	2008/2009 season (100%)	551	800	400	0	0
5	USA	Jeremy Abbott	3521	2007/2008 season (70%)	386	204	134	0	0
6	USA	Johnny Weir	3453	2009/2010 season (100%)	709	648	360	0	0
6	USA	Johnny Weir	3453	2008/2009 season (100%)	0	648	360	0	0
6	USA	Johnny Weir	3453	2007/2008 season (70%)	680	408	280	0	0
7	CZE	Michal Brezina	3420	2009/2010 season (100%)	875	324	292	203	182
7	CZE	Michal Brezina	3420	2008/2009 season (100%)	644	250	250	225	0
7	CZE	Michal Brezina	3420	2007/2008 season (70%)	328	158	93	175	0
8	FRA	Brian Joubert	3328	2009/2010 season (100%)	972	400	292	0	0
8	FRA	Brian Joubert	3328	2008/2009 season (100%)	972	400	292	0	0
8	FRA	Brian Joubert	3328	2007/2008 season (70%)	756	280	0	0	0
9	JPN	Nobunari Oda	3296	2009/2010 season (100%)	638	720	400	0	0
9	JPN	Nobunari Oda	3296	2008/2009 season (100%)	638	400	0	250	250
9	JPN	Nobunari Oda	3296	2007/2008 season (70%)	0	0	0	0	0
10	BEL	Kevin van der Perren	3187	2009/2010 season (100%)	574	262	0	203	0
10	BEL	Kevin van der Perren	3187	2008/2009 season (100%)	680	236	0	250	225
10	BEL	Kevin van der Perren	3187	2007/2008 season (70%)	496	330	252	175	142
11	FRA	Yannick Ponsero	3126	2009/2010 season (100%)	496	262	262	250	0
11	FRA	Yannick Ponsero	3126	2008/2009 season (100%)	612	324	292	250	203
11	FRA	Yannick Ponsero	3126	2007/2008 season (70%)	185	165	165	175	0
12	FRA	Alban Préaubert	3099	2009/2010 season (100%)	446	324	213	225	203
12	FRA	Alban Préaubert	3099	2008/2009 season (100%)	551	324	324	250	225
12	FRA	Alban Préaubert	3099	2007/2008 season (70%)	228	227	183	0	0
13	JPN	Takahiko Kozuka	2976	2009/2010 season (100%)	574	360	213	0	0
13	JPN	Takahiko Kozuka	2976	2008/2009 season (100%)	709	720	400	0	0
13	JPN	Takahiko Kozuka	2976	2007/2008 season (70%)	402	183	134	0	0
14	ITA	Samuel Contesti	2929	2009/2010 season (100%)	638	292	262	250	225
14	ITA	Samuel Contesti	2929	2008/2009 season (100%)	787	0	0	250	225
14	ITA	Samuel Contesti	2929	2007/2008 season (70%)	0	0	0	158	0
15	USA	Adam Rippon	2797	2009/2010 season (100%)	840	324	236	0	0
15	USA	Adam Rippon	2797	2008/2009 season (100%)	715	262	191	0	0
15	USA	Adam Rippon	2797	2007/2008 season (70%)	501	420	175	0	0
16	SUI	Stéphane Lambiel	2488	2009/2010 season (100%)	875	0	0	250	0
16	SUI	Stéphane Lambiel	2488	2008/2009 season (100%)	0	0	0	0	0
16	SUI	Stéphane Lambiel	2488	2007/2008 season (70%)	551	560	252	0	0
17	RUS	Sergei Voronov	2449	2009/2010 season (100%)	305	324	236	225	164
17	RUS	Sergei Voronov	2449	2008/2009 season (100%)	362	236	213	203	0
17	RUS	Sergei Voronov	2449	2007/2008 season (70%)	447	252	0	0	0
18	KAZ	Denis Ten	2385	2009/2010 season (100%)	418	213	0	250	182
18	KAZ	Denis Ten	2385	2008/2009 season (100%)	574	394	250	0	0
18	KAZ	Denis Ten	2385	2007/2008 season (70%)	103	104	68	0	0
19	SWE	Adrian Schultheiss	2325	2009/2010 season (100%)	517	236	213	225	203
19	SWE	Adrian Schultheiss	2325	2008/2009 season (100%)	200	213	213	0	0
19	SWE	Adrian Schultheiss	2325	2007/2008 season (70%)	347	127	104	158	0
20	USA	Brandon Mroz	2195	2009/2010 season (100%)	612	213	191	0	0
20	USA	Brandon Mroz	2195	2008/2009 season (100%)	517	262	213	0	0
20	USA	Brandon Mroz	2195	2007/2008 season (70%)	365	378	175	0	0
21	CHN	Nan Song	2142	2009/2010 season (100%)	644	540	250	0	0
21	CHN	Nan Song	2142	2008/2009 season (100%)	380	164	164	0	0
21	CHN	Nan Song	2142	2007/2008 season (70%)	0	127	0	0	0
22	CAN	Kevin Reynolds	1999	2009/2010 season (100%)	680	236	191	0	0
22	CAN	Kevin Reynolds	1999	2008/2009 season (100%)	308	292	292	0	0
22	CAN	Kevin Reynolds	1999	2007/2008 season (70%)	295	134	0	0	0
23	RUS	Artem Borodulin	1997	2009/2010 season (100%)	339	324	191	225	0
23	RUS	Artem Borodulin	1997	2008/2009 season (100%)	237	292	0	0	0
23	RUS	Artem Borodulin	1997	2007/2008 season (70%)	451	175	142	0	0
24	JPN	Yuzuru Hanyu	1953	2009/2010 season (100%)	715	600	250	0	0
24	JPN	Yuzuru Hanyu	1953	2008/2009 season (100%)	224	164	0	0	0
24	JPN	Yuzuru Hanyu	1953	2007/2008 season (70%)	0	0	0	0	0
25	RUS	Artur Gachinski	1945	2009/2010 season (100%)	579	354	250	250	0
25	RUS	Artur Gachinski	1945	2008/2009 season (100%)	0	287	225	0	0
25	RUS	Artur Gachinski	1945	2007/2008 season (70%)	0	201	158	0	0
26	FRA	Florent Amodio	1828	2009/2010 season (100%)	377	292	0	0	0
26	FRA	Florent Amodio	1828	2008/2009 season (100%)	164	600	250	0	0
26	FRA	Florent Amodio	1828	2007/2008 season (70%)	194	115	93	0	0
27	USA	Ryan Bradley	1813	2009/2010 season (100%)	551	324	0	182	0
27	USA	Ryan Bradley	1813	2008/2009 season (100%)	0	360	213	0	0
27	USA	Ryan Bradley	1813	2007/2008 season (70%)	0	183	165	0	0
28	CAN	Shawn Sawyer	1774	2009/2010 season (100%)	446	360	191	0	0
28	CAN	Shawn Sawyer	1774	2008/2009 season (100%)	0	262	262	0	0
28	CAN	Shawn Sawyer	1774	2007/2008 season (70%)	253	149	0	0	0
29	ESP	Javier Fernandez	1757	2009/2010 season (100%)	402	0	0	250	203
29	ESP	Javier Fernandez	1757	2008/2009 season (100%)	293	182	148	203	0
29	ESP	Javier Fernandez	1757	2007/2008 season (70%)	141	76	0	0	0
30	USA	Stephen Carriere	1690	2009/2010 season (100%)	0	236	191	203	0
30	USA	Stephen Carriere	1690	2008/2009 season (100%)	0	360	236	0	0
30	USA	Stephen Carriere	1690	2007/2008 season (70%)	428	227	204	0	0
31	USA	Armin Mahbanoozadeh	1582	2009/2010 season (100%)	277	0	0	0	0
31	USA	Armin Mahbanoozadeh	1582	2008/2009 season (100%)	0	540	250	0	0
31	USA	Armin Mahbanoozadeh	1582	2007/2008 season (70%)	0	340	175	0	0
32	SWE	Alexander Majorov	1533	2009/2010 season (100%)	342	182	148	203	0
32	SWE	Alexander Majorov	1533	2008/2009 season (100%)	202	133	120	203	0
32	SWE	Alexander Majorov	1533	2007/2008 season (70%)	0	68	68	0	0
33	SWE	Kristoffer Berntsson	1521	2009/2010 season (100%)	192	0	0	250	0
33	SWE	Kristoffer Berntsson	1521	2008/2009 season (100%)	402	191	191	0	0
33	SWE	Kristoffer Berntsson	1521	2007/2008 season (70%)	312	0	0	175	0
34	RUS	Evgeni Plushenko	1480	2009/2010 season (100%)	1080	400	0	0	0
34	RUS	Evgeni Plushenko	1480	2008/2009 season (100%)	0	0	0	0	0
34	RUS	Evgeni Plushenko	1480	2007/2008 season (70%)	0	0	0	0	0
35	USA	Richard Dornbush	1423	2009/2010 season (100%)	0	437	250	0	0
35	USA	Richard Dornbush	1423	2008/2009 season (100%)	0	486	250	0	0
35	USA	Richard Dornbush	1423	2007/2008 season (70%)	0	104	0	0	0
36	JPN	Yasuharu Nanri	1410	2009/2010 season (100%)	264	0	0	0	0
36	JPN	Yasuharu Nanri	1410	2008/2009 season (100%)	264	191	191	250	250
36	JPN	Yasuharu Nanri	1410	2007/2008 season (70%)	126	0	0	0	0
37	CHN	Chao Yang	1314	2009/2010 season (100%)	0	213	191	0	0
37	CHN	Chao Yang	1314	2008/2009 season (100%)	422	225	148	0	0
37	CHN	Chao Yang	1314	2007/2008 season (70%)	115	142	115	0	0
38	RUS	Ivan Bariev	1309	2009/2010 season (100%)	0	0	0	0	0
38	RUS	Ivan Bariev	1309	2008/2009 season (100%)	0	437	225	0	0
38	RUS	Ivan Bariev	1309	2007/2008 season (70%)	266	223	158	0	0
39	CAN	Jeffrey Buttle	1271	2009/2010 season (100%)	0	0	0	0	0
39	CAN	Jeffrey Buttle	1271	2008/2009 season (100%)	0	0	0	0	0
39	CAN	Jeffrey Buttle	1271	2007/2008 season (70%)	840	227	204	0	0
40	CAN	Vaughn Chipeur	1253	2009/2010 season (100%)	118	0	0	0	0
40	CAN	Vaughn Chipeur	1253	2008/2009 season (100%)	496	262	0	0	0
40	CAN	Vaughn Chipeur	1253	2007/2008 season (70%)	312	183	0	0	0
41	CHN	Jinlin Guan	1218	2009/2010 season (100%)	362	0	0	0	0
41	CHN	Jinlin Guan	1218	2008/2009 season (100%)	0	0	0	0	0
41	CHN	Jinlin Guan	1218	2007/2008 season (70%)	405	276	175	0	0
42	JPN	Tatsuki Machida	1210	2009/2010 season (100%)	756	0	0	0	0
42	JPN	Tatsuki Machida	1210	2008/2009 season (100%)	0	203	0	0	0
42	JPN	Tatsuki Machida	1210	2007/2008 season (70%)	0	175	76	0	0
43	CHN	Jialiang Wu	1154	2009/2010 season (100%)	402	0	0	0	0
43	CHN	Jialiang Wu	1154	2008/2009 season (100%)	325	236	191	0	0
43	CHN	Jialiang Wu	1154	2007/2008 season (70%)	228	0	0	0	0
44	JPN	Takahito Mura	1146	2009/2010 season (100%)	0	0	0	0	0
44	JPN	Takahito Mura	1146	2008/2009 season (100%)	275	262	0	250	0
44	JPN	Takahito Mura	1146	2007/2008 season (70%)	75	142	142	0	0
45	SUI	Jamal Othman	1138	2009/2010 season (100%)	131	0	0	203	0
45	SUI	Jamal Othman	1138	2008/2009 season (100%)	264	0	0	203	203
45	SUI	Jamal Othman	1138	2007/2008 season (70%)	92	134	0	0	0
46	JPN	Kensuke Nakaniwa	1132	2009/2010 season (100%)	0	0	0	250	0
46	JPN	Kensuke Nakaniwa	1132	2008/2009 season (100%)	0	0	0	250	164
46	JPN	Kensuke Nakaniwa	1132	2007/2008 season (70%)	185	149	134	0	0
47	CAN	Jeremy Ten	1124	2009/2010 season (100%)	0	0	0	0	0
47	CAN	Jeremy Ten	1124	2008/2009 season (100%)	446	213	0	0	0
47	CAN	Jeremy Ten	1124	2007/2008 season (70%)	239	142	84	0	0
48	ITA	Paolo Bacchini	1111	2009/2010 season (100%)	173	0	0	225	0
48	ITA	Paolo Bacchini	1111	2008/2009 season (100%)	0	0	0	225	225
48	ITA	Paolo Bacchini	1111	2007/2008 season (70%)	88	0	0	175	127
49	USA	Grant Hochstein	1088	2009/2010 season (100%)	469	394	225	0	0
49	USA	Grant Hochstein	1088	2008/2009 season (100%)	0	0	0	0	0
49	USA	Grant Hochstein	1088	2007/2008 season (70%)	0	0	0	0	0
50	GER	Peter Liebers	1086	2009/2010 season (100%)	0	0	0	164	0
50	GER	Peter Liebers	1086	2008/2009 season (100%)	192	236	0	164	164
50	GER	Peter Liebers	1086	2007/2008 season (70%)	166	0	0	0	0
51	USA	Keegan Messing	1076	2009/2010 season (100%)	521	148	0	0	0
51	USA	Keegan Messing	1076	2008/2009 season (100%)	0	225	182	0	0
51	USA	Keegan Messing	1076	2007/2008 season (70%)	0	0	0	0	0
52	SLO	Gregor Urbas	1057	2009/2010 season (100%)	140	0	0	164	0
52	SLO	Gregor Urbas	1057	2008/2009 season (100%)	146	0	0	225	0
52	SLO	Gregor Urbas	1057	2007/2008 season (70%)	205	0	0	175	142
53	CAN	Elladj Balde	1040	2009/2010 season (100%)	0	0	0	0	0
53	CAN	Elladj Balde	1040	2008/2009 season (100%)	342	319	225	0	0
53	CAN	Elladj Balde	1040	2007/2008 season (70%)	61	93	0	0	0
54	RUS	Stanislav Kovalev	1037	2009/2010 season (100%)	0	319	225	0	0
54	RUS	Stanislav Kovalev	1037	2008/2009 season (100%)	147	182	164	0	0
54	RUS	Stanislav Kovalev	1037	2007/2008 season (70%)	0	0	0	0	0
55	RUS	Artem Grigoriev	1027	2009/2010 season (100%)	0	0	0	0	0
55	RUS	Artem Grigoriev	1027	2008/2009 season (100%)	579	164	0	0	0
55	RUS	Artem Grigoriev	1027	2007/2008 season (70%)	0	142	142	0	0
56	USA	Ross Miner	1013	2009/2010 season (100%)	0	486	250	0	0
56	USA	Ross Miner	1013	2008/2009 season (100%)	277	0	0	0	0
56	USA	Ross Miner	1013	2007/2008 season (70%)	0	0	0	0	0
57	USA	Curran Oi	962	2009/2010 season (100%)	0	0	0	0	0
57	USA	Curran Oi	962	2008/2009 season (100%)	469	225	164	0	0
57	USA	Curran Oi	962	2007/2008 season (70%)	0	104	0	0	0
58	UKR	Anton Kovalevski	949	2009/2010 season (100%)	247	0	0	225	182
58	UKR	Anton Kovalevski	949	2008/2009 season (100%)	131	0	0	164	0
58	UKR	Anton Kovalevski	949	2007/2008 season (70%)	113	0	0	0	0
59	CAN	Andrei Rogozine	918	2009/2010 season (100%)	422	148	120	0	0
59	CAN	Andrei Rogozine	918	2008/2009 season (100%)	0	120	108	0	0
59	CAN	Andrei Rogozine	918	2007/2008 season (70%)	0	84	0	0	0
60	RUS	Andrei Lutai	895	2009/2010 season (100%)	0	0	0	0	0
60	RUS	Andrei Lutai	895	2008/2009 season (100%)	465	0	0	0	0
60	RUS	Andrei Lutai	895	2007/2008 season (70%)	281	149	0	0	0
61	KAZ	Abzal Rakimgaliev	875	2009/2010 season (100%)	249	0	0	0	0
61	KAZ	Abzal Rakimgaliev	875	2008/2009 season (100%)	214	133	0	203	0
61	KAZ	Abzal Rakimgaliev	875	2007/2008 season (70%)	166	76	0	0	0
62	FRA	Mark Vaillant	832	2009/2010 season (100%)	0	0	0	0	0
62	FRA	Mark Vaillant	832	2008/2009 season (100%)	119	164	0	203	0
62	FRA	Mark Vaillant	832	2007/2008 season (70%)	0	104	84	158	0
63	USA	Austin Kanallakan	830	2009/2010 season (100%)	0	225	182	0	0
63	USA	Austin Kanallakan	830	2008/2009 season (100%)	0	120	0	0	0
63	USA	Austin Kanallakan	830	2007/2008 season (70%)	0	248	175	0	0
64	ITA	Karel Zelenka	828	2009/2010 season (100%)	83	0	0	225	0
64	ITA	Karel Zelenka	828	2008/2009 season (100%)	0	0	0	182	0
64	ITA	Karel Zelenka	828	2007/2008 season (70%)	173	165	0	0	0
65	JPN	Kento Nakamura	772	2009/2010 season (100%)	192	287	225	0	0
65	JPN	Kento Nakamura	772	2008/2009 season (100%)	0	0	0	0	0
65	JPN	Kento Nakamura	772	2007/2008 season (70%)	0	68	0	0	0
66	CZE	Pavel Kaska	767	2009/2010 season (100%)	0	0	0	0	0
66	CZE	Pavel Kaska	767	2008/2009 season (100%)	0	0	0	182	182
66	CZE	Pavel Kaska	767	2007/2008 season (70%)	0	149	0	127	127
67	SVK	Igor Macypura	763	2009/2010 season (100%)	0	0	0	0	0
67	SVK	Igor Macypura	763	2008/2009 season (100%)	173	0	0	203	0
67	SVK	Igor Macypura	763	2007/2008 season (70%)	102	0	0	158	127
68	SVK	Peter Reitmayer	758	2009/2010 season (100%)	74	120	0	0	0
68	SVK	Peter Reitmayer	758	2008/2009 season (100%)	132	148	120	164	0
68	SVK	Peter Reitmayer	758	2007/2008 season (70%)	0	0	0	0	0
69	FRA	Chafik Besseghier	736	2009/2010 season (100%)	0	0	0	203	203
69	FRA	Chafik Besseghier	736	2008/2009 season (100%)	0	148	0	182	0
69	FRA	Chafik Besseghier	736	2007/2008 season (70%)	0	0	0	0	0
70	USA	Alexander Johnson	731	2009/2010 season (100%)	0	0	0	0	0
70	USA	Alexander Johnson	731	2008/2009 season (100%)	0	354	250	0	0
70	USA	Alexander Johnson	731	2007/2008 season (70%)	0	127	0	0	0
71	RUS	Alexander Nikolaev	715	2009/2010 season (100%)	0	182	182	0	0
71	RUS	Alexander Nikolaev	715	2008/2009 season (100%)	0	203	148	0	0
71	RUS	Alexander Nikolaev	715	2007/2008 season (70%)	0	0	0	0	0
71	AUT	Viktor Pfeifer	715	2009/2010 season (100%)	162	0	0	225	164
71	AUT	Viktor Pfeifer	715	2008/2009 season (100%)	0	0	0	164	0
71	AUT	Viktor Pfeifer	715	2007/2008 season (70%)	0	0	0	0	0
73	RUS	Konstantin Menshov	710	2009/2010 season (100%)	0	0	0	182	164
73	RUS	Konstantin Menshov	710	2008/2009 season (100%)	0	0	0	182	182
73	RUS	Konstantin Menshov	710	2007/2008 season (70%)	0	0	0	158	115
74	ESP	Javier Raya	707	2009/2010 season (100%)	224	148	108	0	0
74	ESP	Javier Raya	707	2008/2009 season (100%)	107	120	0	0	0
74	ESP	Javier Raya	707	2007/2008 season (70%)	0	0	0	0	0
75	GER	Clemens Brummer	696	2009/2010 season (100%)	0	0	0	164	0
75	GER	Clemens Brummer	696	2008/2009 season (100%)	113	0	0	0	0
75	GER	Clemens Brummer	696	2007/2008 season (70%)	150	0	0	142	127
76	UKR	Nikolai Bondar	656	2009/2010 season (100%)	0	0	0	0	0
76	UKR	Nikolai Bondar	656	2008/2009 season (100%)	249	97	0	0	0
76	UKR	Nikolai Bondar	656	2007/2008 season (70%)	127	115	68	0	0
77	RUS	Ivan Tretiakov	606	2009/2010 season (100%)	0	0	0	225	0
77	RUS	Ivan Tretiakov	606	2008/2009 season (100%)	0	0	0	182	0
77	RUS	Ivan Tretiakov	606	2007/2008 season (70%)	0	84	0	115	0
78	GER	Martin Liebers	588	2009/2010 season (100%)	0	0	0	0	0
78	GER	Martin Liebers	588	2008/2009 season (100%)	0	0	0	182	164
78	GER	Martin Liebers	588	2007/2008 season (70%)	0	0	0	127	115
79	RUS	Alexander Uspenski	568	2009/2010 season (100%)	0	0	0	0	0
79	RUS	Alexander Uspenski	568	2008/2009 season (100%)	0	236	0	0	0
79	RUS	Alexander Uspenski	568	2007/2008 season (70%)	0	183	149	0	0
80	JPN	Akio Sasaki	555	2009/2010 season (100%)	0	0	0	0	0
80	JPN	Akio Sasaki	555	2008/2009 season (100%)	0	203	133	0	0
80	JPN	Akio Sasaki	555	2007/2008 season (70%)	92	127	0	0	0
81	UKR	Alexei Bychenko	549	2009/2010 season (100%)	0	0	0	182	0
81	UKR	Alexei Bychenko	549	2008/2009 season (100%)	0	0	0	225	0
81	UKR	Alexei Bychenko	549	2007/2008 season (70%)	0	0	0	142	0
82	GER	Stefan Lindemann	526	2009/2010 season (100%)	362	0	0	164	0
82	GER	Stefan Lindemann	526	2008/2009 season (100%)	0	0	0	0	0
82	GER	Stefan Lindemann	526	2007/2008 season (70%)	0	0	0	0	0
83	POL	Przemyslaw Domanski	521	2009/2010 season (100%)	0	0	0	0	0
83	POL	Przemyslaw Domanski	521	2008/2009 season (100%)	156	0	0	250	0
83	POL	Przemyslaw Domanski	521	2007/2008 season (70%)	0	0	0	115	0
84	CAN	Ronald Lam	517	2009/2010 season (100%)	97	164	108	0	0
84	CAN	Ronald Lam	517	2008/2009 season (100%)	0	148	0	0	0
84	CAN	Ronald Lam	517	2007/2008 season (70%)	0	0	0	0	0
85	RUS	Zhan Bush	514	2009/2010 season (100%)	0	203	203	0	0
85	RUS	Zhan Bush	514	2008/2009 season (100%)	0	108	0	0	0
85	RUS	Zhan Bush	514	2007/2008 season (70%)	0	0	0	0	0
86	CHN	Jiaxing Liu	497	2009/2010 season (100%)	182	182	133	0	0
86	CHN	Jiaxing Liu	497	2008/2009 season (100%)	0	0	0	0	0
86	CHN	Jiaxing Liu	497	2007/2008 season (70%)	0	0	0	0	0
87	USA	Eliot Halverson	492	2009/2010 season (100%)	0	164	0	0	0
87	USA	Eliot Halverson	492	2008/2009 season (100%)	0	120	0	0	0
87	USA	Eliot Halverson	492	2007/2008 season (70%)	0	115	93	0	0
88	RUS	Gordei Gorshkov	490	2009/2010 season (100%)	0	203	203	0	0
88	RUS	Gordei Gorshkov	490	2008/2009 season (100%)	0	0	0	0	0
88	RUS	Gordei Gorshkov	490	2007/2008 season (70%)	0	84	0	0	0
89	FIN	Ari-Pekka Nurmenkari	484	2009/2010 season (100%)	106	0	0	0	0
89	FIN	Ari-Pekka Nurmenkari	484	2008/2009 season (100%)	214	0	0	164	0
89	FIN	Ari-Pekka Nurmenkari	484	2007/2008 season (70%)	0	0	0	0	0
90	FRA	Christopher Boyadji	472	2009/2010 season (100%)	0	0	0	0	0
90	FRA	Christopher Boyadji	472	2008/2009 season (100%)	0	148	133	0	0
90	FRA	Christopher Boyadji	472	2007/2008 season (70%)	0	115	76	0	0
91	USA	Douglas Razzano	464	2009/2010 season (100%)	0	0	0	0	0
91	USA	Douglas Razzano	464	2008/2009 season (100%)	0	0	0	0	0
91	USA	Douglas Razzano	464	2007/2008 season (70%)	0	306	158	0	0
92	USA	Andrew Gonzales	463	2009/2010 season (100%)	0	133	0	0	0
92	USA	Andrew Gonzales	463	2008/2009 season (100%)	0	182	148	0	0
92	USA	Andrew Gonzales	463	2007/2008 season (70%)	0	0	0	0	0
93	KOR	Min-Seok Kim	448	2009/2010 season (100%)	214	0	0	0	0
93	KOR	Min-Seok Kim	448	2008/2009 season (100%)	126	108	0	0	0
93	KOR	Min-Seok Kim	448	2007/2008 season (70%)	0	0	0	0	0
94	GER	Daniel Dotzauer	444	2009/2010 season (100%)	147	164	133	0	0
94	GER	Daniel Dotzauer	444	2008/2009 season (100%)	0	0	0	0	0
94	GER	Daniel Dotzauer	444	2007/2008 season (70%)	0	0	0	0	0
95	FRA	Romain Ponsart	440	2009/2010 season (100%)	0	148	148	0	0
95	FRA	Romain Ponsart	440	2008/2009 season (100%)	0	0	0	0	0
95	FRA	Romain Ponsart	440	2007/2008 season (70%)	0	76	68	0	0
96	BRA	Kevin Alves	426	2009/2010 season (100%)	156	0	0	0	0
96	BRA	Kevin Alves	426	2008/2009 season (100%)	173	97	0	0	0
96	BRA	Kevin Alves	426	2007/2008 season (70%)	88	0	0	0	0
97	FRA	Morgan Ciprès	418	2009/2010 season (100%)	202	108	0	0	0
97	FRA	Morgan Ciprès	418	2008/2009 season (100%)	0	108	0	0	0
97	FRA	Morgan Ciprès	418	2007/2008 season (70%)	0	0	0	0	0
98	RUS	Nikita Mikhailov	414	2009/2010 season (100%)	0	0	0	0	0
98	RUS	Nikita Mikhailov	414	2008/2009 season (100%)	0	182	164	0	0
98	RUS	Nikita Mikhailov	414	2007/2008 season (70%)	68	0	0	0	0
98	SUI	Moris Pfeifhofer	414	2009/2010 season (100%)	0	0	0	0	0
98	SUI	Moris Pfeifhofer	414	2008/2009 season (100%)	0	0	0	164	0
98	SUI	Moris Pfeifhofer	414	2007/2008 season (70%)	157	93	0	0	0
100	FRA	Kim Lucine	393	2009/2010 season (100%)	0	0	0	0	0
100	FRA	Kim Lucine	393	2008/2009 season (100%)	0	0	0	0	0
100	FRA	Kim Lucine	393	2007/2008 season (70%)	174	115	104	0	0
101	USA	Shaun Rogers	383	2009/2010 season (100%)	0	0	0	0	0
101	USA	Shaun Rogers	383	2008/2009 season (100%)	0	0	0	225	0
101	USA	Shaun Rogers	383	2007/2008 season (70%)	0	0	0	158	0
102	RUS	Artur Dmitriev	380	2009/2010 season (100%)	380	0	0	0	0
102	RUS	Artur Dmitriev	380	2008/2009 season (100%)	0	0	0	0	0
102	RUS	Artur Dmitriev	380	2007/2008 season (70%)	0	0	0	0	0
103	RUS	Andrei Griazev	376	2009/2010 season (100%)	0	0	0	0	0
103	RUS	Andrei Griazev	376	2008/2009 season (100%)	0	0	0	0	0
103	RUS	Andrei Griazev	376	2007/2008 season (70%)	0	227	149	0	0
104	RUS	Mark Shakhmatov	367	2009/2010 season (100%)	0	203	164	0	0
104	RUS	Mark Shakhmatov	367	2008/2009 season (100%)	0	0	0	0	0
104	RUS	Mark Shakhmatov	367	2007/2008 season (70%)	0	0	0	0	0
105	RUS	Vladimir Uspenski	353	2009/2010 season (100%)	0	0	0	0	0
105	RUS	Vladimir Uspenski	353	2008/2009 season (100%)	0	0	0	0	0
105	RUS	Vladimir Uspenski	353	2007/2008 season (70%)	0	127	84	142	0
106	POL	Sebastian Iwasaki	347	2009/2010 season (100%)	119	0	0	0	0
106	POL	Sebastian Iwasaki	347	2008/2009 season (100%)	0	120	108	0	0
106	POL	Sebastian Iwasaki	347	2007/2008 season (70%)	0	0	0	0	0
107	USA	Joshua Farris	346	2009/2010 season (100%)	0	182	164	0	0
107	USA	Joshua Farris	346	2008/2009 season (100%)	0	0	0	0	0
107	USA	Joshua Farris	346	2007/2008 season (70%)	0	0	0	0	0
108	GER	Denis Wieczorek	345	2009/2010 season (100%)	0	0	0	0	0
108	GER	Denis Wieczorek	345	2008/2009 season (100%)	182	108	0	0	0
108	GER	Denis Wieczorek	345	2007/2008 season (70%)	55	0	0	0	0
109	CAN	Christopher Mabee	338	2009/2010 season (100%)	0	0	0	0	0
109	CAN	Christopher Mabee	338	2008/2009 season (100%)	0	0	0	0	0
109	CAN	Christopher Mabee	338	2007/2008 season (70%)	0	204	134	0	0
110	CAN	Samuel Morais	337	2009/2010 season (100%)	0	120	0	0	0
110	CAN	Samuel Morais	337	2008/2009 season (100%)	0	120	97	0	0
110	CAN	Samuel Morais	337	2007/2008 season (70%)	0	0	0	0	0
111	AUS	Mark Webster	332	2009/2010 season (100%)	140	0	0	0	0
111	AUS	Mark Webster	332	2008/2009 season (100%)	192	0	0	0	0
111	AUS	Mark Webster	332	2007/2008 season (70%)	0	0	0	0	0
112	POL	Maciej Cieplucha	328	2009/2010 season (100%)	102	0	0	182	0
112	POL	Maciej Cieplucha	328	2008/2009 season (100%)	0	0	0	0	0
112	POL	Maciej Cieplucha	328	2007/2008 season (70%)	44	0	0	0	0
113	USA	Tommy Steenberg	320	2009/2010 season (100%)	0	0	0	0	0
113	USA	Tommy Steenberg	320	2008/2009 season (100%)	0	0	0	0	0
113	USA	Tommy Steenberg	320	2007/2008 season (70%)	216	104	0	0	0
114	ITA	Ruben Errampalli	299	2009/2010 season (100%)	0	0	0	0	0
114	ITA	Ruben Errampalli	299	2008/2009 season (100%)	87	97	0	0	0
114	ITA	Ruben Errampalli	299	2007/2008 season (70%)	0	0	0	115	0
115	EST	Viktor Romanenkov	298	2009/2010 season (100%)	0	120	0	0	0
115	EST	Viktor Romanenkov	298	2008/2009 season (100%)	70	108	0	0	0
115	EST	Viktor Romanenkov	298	2007/2008 season (70%)	0	0	0	0	0
116	CZE	Petr Bidar	294	2009/2010 season (100%)	70	148	0	0	0
116	CZE	Petr Bidar	294	2008/2009 season (100%)	0	0	0	0	0
116	CZE	Petr Bidar	294	2007/2008 season (70%)	0	76	0	0	0
117	TPE	Stephen Li-Chung Kuo	293	2009/2010 season (100%)	173	120	0	0	0
117	TPE	Stephen Li-Chung Kuo	293	2008/2009 season (100%)	0	0	0	0	0
117	TPE	Stephen Li-Chung Kuo	293	2007/2008 season (70%)	0	0	0	0	0
117	CAN	Joey Russell	293	2009/2010 season (100%)	293	0	0	0	0
117	CAN	Joey Russell	293	2008/2009 season (100%)	0	0	0	0	0
117	CAN	Joey Russell	293	2007/2008 season (70%)	0	0	0	0	0
119	CZE	Petr Coufal	292	2009/2010 season (100%)	87	108	0	0	0
119	CZE	Petr Coufal	292	2008/2009 season (100%)	97	0	0	0	0
119	CZE	Petr Coufal	292	2007/2008 season (70%)	0	0	0	0	0
120	MEX	Luis Hernandez	290	2009/2010 season (100%)	0	0	0	0	0
120	MEX	Luis Hernandez	290	2008/2009 season (100%)	156	0	0	0	0
120	MEX	Luis Hernandez	290	2007/2008 season (70%)	134	0	0	0	0
121	GER	Franz Streubel	285	2009/2010 season (100%)	0	120	97	0	0
121	GER	Franz Streubel	285	2008/2009 season (100%)	0	0	0	0	0
121	GER	Franz Streubel	285	2007/2008 season (70%)	0	68	0	0	0
122	BLR	Alexandr Kazakov	278	2009/2010 season (100%)	180	0	0	0	0
122	BLR	Alexandr Kazakov	278	2008/2009 season (100%)	0	0	0	0	0
122	BLR	Alexandr Kazakov	278	2007/2008 season (70%)	98	0	0	0	0
123	POL	Konstantin Tupikov	274	2009/2010 season (100%)	0	0	0	0	0
123	POL	Konstantin Tupikov	274	2008/2009 season (100%)	0	0	0	203	0
123	POL	Konstantin Tupikov	274	2007/2008 season (70%)	71	0	0	0	0
124	BEL	Jorik Hendrickx	272	2009/2010 season (100%)	164	108	0	0	0
124	BEL	Jorik Hendrickx	272	2008/2009 season (100%)	0	0	0	0	0
124	BEL	Jorik Hendrickx	272	2007/2008 season (70%)	0	0	0	0	0
124	FRA	Paul Emmanuel Richardeau	272	2009/2010 season (100%)	0	108	0	164	0
124	FRA	Paul Emmanuel Richardeau	272	2008/2009 season (100%)	0	0	0	0	0
124	FRA	Paul Emmanuel Richardeau	272	2007/2008 season (70%)	0	0	0	0	0
126	UKR	Vitali Sazonets	261	2009/2010 season (100%)	0	0	0	0	0
126	UKR	Vitali Sazonets	261	2008/2009 season (100%)	0	0	0	182	0
126	UKR	Vitali Sazonets	261	2007/2008 season (70%)	79	0	0	0	0
127	CAN	Liam Firus	253	2009/2010 season (100%)	0	133	120	0	0
127	CAN	Liam Firus	253	2008/2009 season (100%)	0	0	0	0	0
127	CAN	Liam Firus	253	2007/2008 season (70%)	0	0	0	0	0
128	CHN	Han Yan	250	2009/2010 season (100%)	0	250	0	0	0
128	CHN	Han Yan	250	2008/2009 season (100%)	0	0	0	0	0
128	CHN	Han Yan	250	2007/2008 season (70%)	0	0	0	0	0
129	JPN	Takuya Kondoh	240	2009/2010 season (100%)	0	164	0	0	0
129	JPN	Takuya Kondoh	240	2008/2009 season (100%)	0	0	0	0	0
129	JPN	Takuya Kondoh	240	2007/2008 season (70%)	0	76	0	0	0
130	CHN	Song Gao	237	2009/2010 season (100%)	0	0	0	0	0
130	CHN	Song Gao	237	2008/2009 season (100%)	237	0	0	0	0
130	CHN	Song Gao	237	2007/2008 season (70%)	0	0	0	0	0
131	RSA	Justin Pietersen	234	2009/2010 season (100%)	0	0	0	0	0
131	RSA	Justin Pietersen	234	2008/2009 season (100%)	113	0	0	0	0
131	RSA	Justin Pietersen	234	2007/2008 season (70%)	121	0	0	0	0
132	AUS	Robert McNamara	219	2009/2010 season (100%)	0	0	0	0	0
132	AUS	Robert McNamara	219	2008/2009 season (100%)	140	0	0	0	0
132	AUS	Robert McNamara	219	2007/2008 season (70%)	79	0	0	0	0
133	AUS	Nicholas Fernandez	211	2009/2010 season (100%)	102	0	0	0	0
133	AUS	Nicholas Fernandez	211	2008/2009 season (100%)	102	0	0	0	0
133	AUS	Nicholas Fernandez	211	2007/2008 season (70%)	109	0	0	0	0
134	CRO	Boris Martinec	210	2009/2010 season (100%)	0	0	0	0	0
134	CRO	Boris Martinec	210	2008/2009 season (100%)	83	0	0	0	0
134	CRO	Boris Martinec	210	2007/2008 season (70%)	0	0	0	127	0
135	CHN	Ming Xu	205	2009/2010 season (100%)	0	0	0	0	0
135	CHN	Ming Xu	205	2008/2009 season (100%)	0	0	0	0	0
135	CHN	Ming Xu	205	2007/2008 season (70%)	205	0	0	0	0
136	FIN	Bela Papp	196	2009/2010 season (100%)	63	0	0	0	0
136	FIN	Bela Papp	196	2008/2009 season (100%)	0	133	0	0	0
136	FIN	Bela Papp	196	2007/2008 season (70%)	0	0	0	0	0
137	AUS	Matthew Precious	189	2009/2010 season (100%)	126	0	0	0	0
137	AUS	Matthew Precious	189	2008/2009 season (100%)	63	0	0	0	0
137	AUS	Matthew Precious	189	2007/2008 season (70%)	0	0	0	0	0
138	TPE	Wun-Chang Shih	187	2009/2010 season (100%)	113	0	0	0	0
138	TPE	Wun-Chang Shih	187	2008/2009 season (100%)	74	0	0	0	0
138	TPE	Wun-Chang Shih	187	2007/2008 season (70%)	0	0	0	0	0
139	TPE	Charles Shou-San Pao	184	2009/2010 season (100%)	92	0	0	0	0
139	TPE	Charles Shou-San Pao	184	2008/2009 season (100%)	92	0	0	0	0
139	TPE	Charles Shou-San Pao	184	2007/2008 season (70%)	0	0	0	0	0
140	RUS	Sergei Dobrin	183	2009/2010 season (100%)	0	0	0	0	0
140	RUS	Sergei Dobrin	183	2008/2009 season (100%)	0	0	0	0	0
140	RUS	Sergei Dobrin	183	2007/2008 season (70%)	0	183	0	0	0
140	CAN	Ian Martinez	183	2009/2010 season (100%)	0	0	0	0	0
140	CAN	Ian Martinez	183	2008/2009 season (100%)	0	0	0	0	0
140	CAN	Ian Martinez	183	2007/2008 season (70%)	0	115	68	0	0
142	JPN	Fumiya Itai	182	2009/2010 season (100%)	0	0	0	182	0
142	JPN	Fumiya Itai	182	2008/2009 season (100%)	0	0	0	0	0
142	JPN	Fumiya Itai	182	2007/2008 season (70%)	0	0	0	0	0
142	JPN	Daisuke Murakami	182	2009/2010 season (100%)	0	0	0	0	0
142	JPN	Daisuke Murakami	182	2008/2009 season (100%)	0	182	0	0	0
142	JPN	Daisuke Murakami	182	2007/2008 season (70%)	0	0	0	0	0
142	JPN	Yojo Tsuboi	182	2009/2010 season (100%)	0	0	0	182	0
142	JPN	Yojo Tsuboi	182	2008/2009 season (100%)	0	0	0	0	0
142	JPN	Yojo Tsuboi	182	2007/2008 season (70%)	0	0	0	0	0
145	GER	Christopher Berneck	177	2009/2010 season (100%)	0	0	0	0	0
145	GER	Christopher Berneck	177	2008/2009 season (100%)	0	0	0	0	0
145	GER	Christopher Berneck	177	2007/2008 season (70%)	0	93	84	0	0
146	FRA	Yoann Deslot	175	2009/2010 season (100%)	0	0	0	0	0
146	FRA	Yoann Deslot	175	2008/2009 season (100%)	0	0	0	0	0
146	FRA	Yoann Deslot	175	2007/2008 season (70%)	0	0	0	175	0
147	MEX	Humberto Contreras	166	2009/2010 season (100%)	83	0	0	0	0
147	MEX	Humberto Contreras	166	2008/2009 season (100%)	83	0	0	0	0
147	MEX	Humberto Contreras	166	2007/2008 season (70%)	71	0	0	0	0
148	JPN	Takemochi Ogami	164	2009/2010 season (100%)	0	0	0	164	0
148	JPN	Takemochi Ogami	164	2008/2009 season (100%)	0	0	0	0	0
148	JPN	Takemochi Ogami	164	2007/2008 season (70%)	0	0	0	0	0
148	GBR	Thomas Paulson	164	2009/2010 season (100%)	0	0	0	0	0
148	GBR	Thomas Paulson	164	2008/2009 season (100%)	0	0	0	164	0
148	GBR	Thomas Paulson	164	2007/2008 season (70%)	0	0	0	0	0
150	USA	Parker Pennington	158	2009/2010 season (100%)	0	0	0	0	0
150	USA	Parker Pennington	158	2008/2009 season (100%)	0	0	0	0	0
150	USA	Parker Pennington	158	2007/2008 season (70%)	0	0	0	158	0
151	GBR	Elliot Hilton	150	2009/2010 season (100%)	0	0	0	0	0
151	GBR	Elliot Hilton	150	2008/2009 season (100%)	74	0	0	0	0
151	GBR	Elliot Hilton	150	2007/2008 season (70%)	0	76	0	0	0
151	NZL	Tristan Thode	150	2009/2010 season (100%)	0	0	0	0	0
151	NZL	Tristan Thode	150	2008/2009 season (100%)	0	0	0	0	0
151	NZL	Tristan Thode	150	2007/2008 season (70%)	150	0	0	0	0
153	SVK	Jakub Strobl	146	2009/2010 season (100%)	0	97	0	0	0
153	SVK	Jakub Strobl	146	2008/2009 season (100%)	0	0	0	0	0
153	SVK	Jakub Strobl	146	2007/2008 season (70%)	49	0	0	0	0
154	AUT	Severin Kiefer	142	2009/2010 season (100%)	0	0	0	0	0
154	AUT	Severin Kiefer	142	2008/2009 season (100%)	0	0	0	0	0
154	AUT	Severin Kiefer	142	2007/2008 season (70%)	0	0	0	142	0
155	USA	William Brewster	133	2009/2010 season (100%)	0	0	0	0	0
155	USA	William Brewster	133	2008/2009 season (100%)	0	133	0	0	0
155	USA	William Brewster	133	2007/2008 season (70%)	0	0	0	0	0
155	USA	Steven Evans	133	2009/2010 season (100%)	0	133	0	0	0
155	USA	Steven Evans	133	2008/2009 season (100%)	0	0	0	0	0
155	USA	Steven Evans	133	2007/2008 season (70%)	0	0	0	0	0
155	UKR	Stanislav Pertsov	133	2009/2010 season (100%)	0	133	0	0	0
155	UKR	Stanislav Pertsov	133	2008/2009 season (100%)	0	0	0	0	0
155	UKR	Stanislav Pertsov	133	2007/2008 season (70%)	0	0	0	0	0
155	SUI	Stephane Walker	133	2009/2010 season (100%)	0	0	0	0	0
155	SUI	Stephane Walker	133	2008/2009 season (100%)	0	133	0	0	0
155	SUI	Stephane Walker	133	2007/2008 season (70%)	0	0	0	0	0
155	JPN	Yukihiro Yoshida	133	2009/2010 season (100%)	0	0	0	0	0
155	JPN	Yukihiro Yoshida	133	2008/2009 season (100%)	0	133	0	0	0
155	JPN	Yukihiro Yoshida	133	2007/2008 season (70%)	0	0	0	0	0
155	USA	Alexander Zahradnicek	133	2009/2010 season (100%)	0	133	0	0	0
155	USA	Alexander Zahradnicek	133	2008/2009 season (100%)	0	0	0	0	0
155	USA	Alexander Zahradnicek	133	2007/2008 season (70%)	0	0	0	0	0
161	CHN	Wenbo Zang	132	2009/2010 season (100%)	132	0	0	0	0
161	CHN	Wenbo Zang	132	2008/2009 season (100%)	0	0	0	0	0
161	CHN	Wenbo Zang	132	2007/2008 season (70%)	0	0	0	0	0
162	RUS	Ilia Gurilev	127	2009/2010 season (100%)	0	0	0	0	0
162	RUS	Ilia Gurilev	127	2008/2009 season (100%)	0	0	0	0	0
162	RUS	Ilia Gurilev	127	2007/2008 season (70%)	0	127	0	0	0
162	FRA	Jeremy Prevoteaux	127	2009/2010 season (100%)	0	0	0	0	0
162	FRA	Jeremy Prevoteaux	127	2008/2009 season (100%)	0	0	0	0	0
162	FRA	Jeremy Prevoteaux	127	2007/2008 season (70%)	0	0	0	127	0
164	ROU	Zoltán Kelemen	126	2009/2010 season (100%)	126	0	0	0	0
164	ROU	Zoltán Kelemen	126	2008/2009 season (100%)	0	0	0	0	0
164	ROU	Zoltán Kelemen	126	2007/2008 season (70%)	0	0	0	0	0
165	RUS	Daniil Gleichengauz	115	2009/2010 season (100%)	0	0	0	0	0
165	RUS	Daniil Gleichengauz	115	2008/2009 season (100%)	0	0	0	0	0
165	RUS	Daniil Gleichengauz	115	2007/2008 season (70%)	0	115	0	0	0
165	JPN	Ryo Shibata	115	2009/2010 season (100%)	0	0	0	0	0
165	JPN	Ryo Shibata	115	2008/2009 season (100%)	0	0	0	0	0
165	JPN	Ryo Shibata	115	2007/2008 season (70%)	0	0	0	115	0
167	JPN	Ryuichi Kihara	108	2009/2010 season (100%)	0	108	0	0	0
167	JPN	Ryuichi Kihara	108	2008/2009 season (100%)	0	0	0	0	0
167	JPN	Ryuichi Kihara	108	2007/2008 season (70%)	0	0	0	0	0
167	CAN	Patrick Wong	108	2009/2010 season (100%)	0	0	0	0	0
167	CAN	Patrick Wong	108	2008/2009 season (100%)	0	108	0	0	0
167	CAN	Patrick Wong	108	2007/2008 season (70%)	0	0	0	0	0
169	NZL	Joel Watson	98	2009/2010 season (100%)	0	0	0	0	0
169	NZL	Joel Watson	98	2008/2009 season (100%)	0	0	0	0	0
169	NZL	Joel Watson	98	2007/2008 season (70%)	98	0	0	0	0
170	POL	Kamil Bialas	97	2009/2010 season (100%)	0	97	0	0	0
170	POL	Kamil Bialas	97	2008/2009 season (100%)	0	0	0	0	0
170	POL	Kamil Bialas	97	2007/2008 season (70%)	0	0	0	0	0
170	BEL	Ruben Blommaert	97	2009/2010 season (100%)	0	0	0	0	0
170	BEL	Ruben Blommaert	97	2008/2009 season (100%)	0	97	0	0	0
170	BEL	Ruben Blommaert	97	2007/2008 season (70%)	0	0	0	0	0
170	ITA	Saverio Giacomelli	97	2009/2010 season (100%)	0	97	0	0	0
170	ITA	Saverio Giacomelli	97	2008/2009 season (100%)	0	0	0	0	0
170	ITA	Saverio Giacomelli	97	2007/2008 season (70%)	0	0	0	0	0
170	UKR	Dmitri Ignatenko	97	2009/2010 season (100%)	0	97	0	0	0
170	UKR	Dmitri Ignatenko	97	2008/2009 season (100%)	0	0	0	0	0
170	UKR	Dmitri Ignatenko	97	2007/2008 season (70%)	0	0	0	0	0
170	SUI	Timothy Leemann	97	2009/2010 season (100%)	0	0	0	0	0
170	SUI	Timothy Leemann	97	2008/2009 season (100%)	0	97	0	0	0
170	SUI	Timothy Leemann	97	2007/2008 season (70%)	0	0	0	0	0
170	CAN	Paul Poirier	97	2009/2010 season (100%)	0	0	0	0	0
170	CAN	Paul Poirier	97	2008/2009 season (100%)	0	97	0	0	0
170	CAN	Paul Poirier	97	2007/2008 season (70%)	0	0	0	0	0
170	SUI	Tomi Pulkkinen	97	2009/2010 season (100%)	0	0	0	0	0
170	SUI	Tomi Pulkkinen	97	2008/2009 season (100%)	0	97	0	0	0
170	SUI	Tomi Pulkkinen	97	2007/2008 season (70%)	0	0	0	0	0
170	RUS	Alexander Stepanov	97	2009/2010 season (100%)	0	97	0	0	0
170	RUS	Alexander Stepanov	97	2008/2009 season (100%)	0	0	0	0	0
170	RUS	Alexander Stepanov	97	2007/2008 season (70%)	0	0	0	0	0

==== Ladies' singles (211 skaters) ====
As of 27 March 2010

Rank	Nation	Skater	Points	Season	ISU Championships or Olympics	(Junior) Grand Prix and Final		Selected International Competition	
Rank	Nation	Skater	Points	Season	Best	Best	2nd Best	Best	2nd Best
1	KOR	Yuna Kim	4880	2009/2010 season (100%)	1200	800	400	0	0
1	KOR	Yuna Kim	4880	2008/2009 season (100%)	1200	720	400	0	0
1	KOR	Yuna Kim	4880	2007/2008 season (70%)	680	560	280	0	0
2	ITA	Carolina Kostner	4195	2009/2010 season (100%)	840	236	236	250	0
2	ITA	Carolina Kostner	4195	2008/2009 season (100%)	756	648	400	250	0
2	ITA	Carolina Kostner	4195	2007/2008 season (70%)	756	454	280	175	142
3	JPN	Mao Asada	4139	2009/2010 season (100%)	1200	360	262	0	0
3	JPN	Mao Asada	4139	2008/2009 season (100%)	875	800	400	0	0
3	JPN	Mao Asada	4139	2007/2008 season (70%)	840	504	280	0	0
4	CAN	Joannie Rochette	3960	2009/2010 season (100%)	972	525	400	0	0
4	CAN	Joannie Rochette	3960	2008/2009 season (100%)	1080	583	400	0	0
4	CAN	Joannie Rochette	3960	2007/2008 season (70%)	551	227	227	0	0
5	FIN	Laura Lepistö	3801	2009/2010 season (100%)	972	324	262	225	0
5	FIN	Laura Lepistö	3801	2008/2009 season (100%)	840	324	262	225	225
5	FIN	Laura Lepistö	3801	2007/2008 season (70%)	476	183	149	142	127
6	JPN	Miki Ando	3799	2009/2010 season (100%)	875	720	400	0	0
6	JPN	Miki Ando	3799	2008/2009 season (100%)	972	472	360	0	0
6	JPN	Miki Ando	3799	2007/2008 season (70%)	476	252	204	0	0
7	JPN	Akiko Suzuki	3444	2009/2010 season (100%)	756	648	400	250	0
7	JPN	Akiko Suzuki	3444	2008/2009 season (100%)	402	360	0	250	203
7	JPN	Akiko Suzuki	3444	2007/2008 season (70%)	0	0	0	175	175
8	RUS	Alena Leonova	3014	2009/2010 season (100%)	517	472	360	250	0
8	RUS	Alena Leonova	3014	2008/2009 season (100%)	715	262	213	225	0
8	RUS	Alena Leonova	3014	2007/2008 season (70%)	295	158	115	0	0
9	USA	Rachael Flatt	2815	2009/2010 season (100%)	638	360	292	0	0
9	USA	Rachael Flatt	2815	2008/2009 season (100%)	787	360	292	0	0
9	USA	Rachael Flatt	2815	2007/2008 season (70%)	501	378	175	0	0
10	HUN	Júlia Sebestyén	2737	2009/2010 season (100%)	496	324	236	250	182
10	HUN	Júlia Sebestyén	2737	2008/2009 season (100%)	402	213	0	250	0
10	HUN	Júlia Sebestyén	2737	2007/2008 season (70%)	428	183	149	175	115
11	FIN	Kiira Korpi	2619	2009/2010 season (100%)	612	360	191	225	203
11	FIN	Kiira Korpi	2619	2008/2009 season (100%)	551	0	0	0	0
11	FIN	Kiira Korpi	2619	2007/2008 season (70%)	386	204	0	158	115
12	USA	Caroline Zhang	2610	2009/2010 season (100%)	680	292	191	0	0
12	USA	Caroline Zhang	2610	2008/2009 season (100%)	644	324	262	0	0
12	USA	Caroline Zhang	2610	2007/2008 season (70%)	451	408	252	0	0
13	USA	Mirai Nagasu	2516	2009/2010 season (100%)	875	292	262	0	0
13	USA	Mirai Nagasu	2516	2008/2009 season (100%)	0	262	191	0	0
13	USA	Mirai Nagasu	2516	2007/2008 season (70%)	405	420	175	0	0
14	JPN	Kanako Murakami	2502	2009/2010 season (100%)	715	600	250	250	0
14	JPN	Kanako Murakami	2502	2008/2009 season (100%)	0	437	250	0	0
14	JPN	Kanako Murakami	2502	2007/2008 season (70%)	0	0	0	0	0
15	GEO	Elene Gedevanishvili	2404	2009/2010 season (100%)	680	236	213	0	0
15	GEO	Elene Gedevanishvili	2404	2008/2009 season (100%)	465	213	0	250	182
15	GEO	Elene Gedevanishvili	2404	2007/2008 season (70%)	312	165	134	0	0
16	USA	Ashley Wagner	2387	2009/2010 season (100%)	0	583	360	0	0
16	USA	Ashley Wagner	2387	2008/2009 season (100%)	579	292	292	0	0
16	USA	Ashley Wagner	2387	2007/2008 season (70%)	281	227	183	0	0
17	CAN	Cynthia Phaneuf	2191	2009/2010 season (100%)	787	236	213	0	0
17	CAN	Cynthia Phaneuf	2191	2008/2009 season (100%)	551	213	191	0	0
17	CAN	Cynthia Phaneuf	2191	2007/2008 season (70%)	312	0	0	0	0
18	JPN	Yukari Nakano	2190	2009/2010 season (100%)	0	324	292	0	0
18	JPN	Yukari Nakano	2190	2008/2009 season (100%)	0	525	360	0	0
18	JPN	Yukari Nakano	2190	2007/2008 season (70%)	613	368	252	0	0
19	USA	Alissa Czisny	2186	2009/2010 season (100%)	0	360	292	250	0
19	USA	Alissa Czisny	2186	2008/2009 season (100%)	418	324	292	250	0
19	USA	Alissa Czisny	2186	2007/2008 season (70%)	0	165	0	0	0
20	JPN	Fumie Suguri	1991	2009/2010 season (100%)	0	292	213	0	0
20	JPN	Fumie Suguri	1991	2008/2009 season (100%)	574	360	324	0	0
20	JPN	Fumie Suguri	1991	2007/2008 season (70%)	228	204	183	0	0
21	EST	Elena Glebova	1975	2009/2010 season (100%)	325	262	0	182	0
21	EST	Elena Glebova	1975	2008/2009 season (100%)	264	236	0	225	182
21	EST	Elena Glebova	1975	2007/2008 season (70%)	193	165	134	0	0
21	SUI	Sarah Meier	1975	2009/2010 season (100%)	551	0	0	0	0
21	SUI	Sarah Meier	1975	2008/2009 season (100%)	517	236	0	203	0
21	SUI	Sarah Meier	1975	2007/2008 season (70%)	529	252	204	0	0
23	GER	Sarah Hecken	1943	2009/2010 season (100%)	377	191	0	0	0
23	GER	Sarah Hecken	1943	2008/2009 season (100%)	380	203	164	250	203
23	GER	Sarah Hecken	1943	2007/2008 season (70%)	239	175	0	0	0
24	SWE	Joshi Helgesson	1920	2009/2010 season (100%)	308	0	0	203	0
24	SWE	Joshi Helgesson	1920	2008/2009 season (100%)	521	133	108	225	225
24	SWE	Joshi Helgesson	1920	2007/2008 season (70%)	266	104	93	0	0
25	RUS	Ksenia Makarova	1850	2009/2010 season (100%)	574	437	225	250	0
25	RUS	Ksenia Makarova	1850	2008/2009 season (100%)	0	182	182	0	0
25	RUS	Ksenia Makarova	1850	2007/2008 season (70%)	0	0	0	0	0
26	GBR	Jenna McCorkell	1823	2009/2010 season (100%)	305	191	0	203	164
26	GBR	Jenna McCorkell	1823	2008/2009 season (100%)	362	213	0	203	182
26	GBR	Jenna McCorkell	1823	2007/2008 season (70%)	281	0	0	142	0
27	SVK	Ivana Reitmayerova	1703	2009/2010 season (100%)	192	97	0	0	0
27	SVK	Ivana Reitmayerova	1703	2008/2009 season (100%)	342	148	108	250	225
27	SVK	Ivana Reitmayerova	1703	2007/2008 season (70%)	115	68	0	158	115
28	SWE	Viktoria Helgesson	1660	2009/2010 season (100%)	465	0	0	250	164
28	SWE	Viktoria Helgesson	1660	2008/2009 season (100%)	156	0	0	250	164
28	SWE	Viktoria Helgesson	1660	2007/2008 season (70%)	140	127	84	115	0
29	ITA	Valentina Marchei	1649	2009/2010 season (100%)	402	0	0	250	225
29	ITA	Valentina Marchei	1649	2008/2009 season (100%)	0	0	0	250	0
29	ITA	Valentina Marchei	1649	2007/2008 season (70%)	347	0	0	175	0
30	FIN	Susanna Pã–Ykiã–	1634	2009/2010 season (100%)	0	0	0	0	0
30	FIN	Susanna Pã–Ykiã–	1634	2008/2009 season (100%)	680	262	236	164	0
30	FIN	Susanna Pã–Ykiã–	1634	2007/2008 season (70%)	0	134	0	158	0
31	USA	Alexe Gilles	1608	2009/2010 season (100%)	362	262	0	0	0
31	USA	Alexe Gilles	1608	2008/2009 season (100%)	0	486	250	0	0
31	USA	Alexe Gilles	1608	2007/2008 season (70%)	0	248	158	0	0
32	JPN	Haruka Imai	1518	2009/2010 season (100%)	551	203	0	203	164
32	JPN	Haruka Imai	1518	2008/2009 season (100%)	147	250	0	0	0
32	JPN	Haruka Imai	1518	2007/2008 season (70%)	0	0	0	0	0
33	USA	Kimmie Meissner	1439	2009/2010 season (100%)	0	0	0	0	0
33	USA	Kimmie Meissner	1439	2008/2009 season (100%)	0	191	191	0	0
33	USA	Kimmie Meissner	1439	2007/2008 season (70%)	447	330	280	0	0
34	JPN	Yuki Nishino	1398	2009/2010 season (100%)	0	225	148	182	0
34	JPN	Yuki Nishino	1398	2008/2009 season (100%)	0	0	0	0	0
34	JPN	Yuki Nishino	1398	2007/2008 season (70%)	328	340	175	0	0
35	USA	Amanda Dobbs	1384	2009/2010 season (100%)	612	0	0	203	0
35	USA	Amanda Dobbs	1384	2008/2009 season (100%)	0	319	250	0	0
35	USA	Amanda Dobbs	1384	2007/2008 season (70%)	0	0	0	0	0
36	ITA	Stefania Berton	1374	2009/2010 season (100%)	0	0	0	0	0
36	ITA	Stefania Berton	1374	2008/2009 season (100%)	173	203	182	250	203
36	ITA	Stefania Berton	1374	2007/2008 season (70%)	166	104	93	0	0
37	RUS	Polina Shelepen	1311	2009/2010 season (100%)	521	540	250	0	0
37	RUS	Polina Shelepen	1311	2008/2009 season (100%)	0	0	0	0	0
37	RUS	Polina Shelepen	1311	2007/2008 season (70%)	0	0	0	0	0
38	CAN	Diane Szmiett	1306	2009/2010 season (100%)	325	191	0	0	0
38	CAN	Diane Szmiett	1306	2008/2009 season (100%)	202	287	225	0	0
38	CAN	Diane Szmiett	1306	2007/2008 season (70%)	0	76	0	0	0
39	RUS	Katarina Gerboldt	1282	2009/2010 season (100%)	0	0	0	225	203
39	RUS	Katarina Gerboldt	1282	2008/2009 season (100%)	496	0	0	0	0
39	RUS	Katarina Gerboldt	1282	2007/2008 season (70%)	216	0	0	142	0
40	TUR	Tuğba Karademir	1269	2009/2010 season (100%)	264	0	0	182	0
40	TUR	Tuğba Karademir	1269	2008/2009 season (100%)	325	0	0	225	0
40	TUR	Tuğba Karademir	1269	2007/2008 season (70%)	205	0	0	158	115
41	USA	Katrina Hacker	1243	2009/2010 season (100%)	0	0	0	0	0
41	USA	Katrina Hacker	1243	2008/2009 season (100%)	469	236	191	0	0
41	USA	Katrina Hacker	1243	2007/2008 season (70%)	347	0	0	0	0
42	GER	Annette Dytrt	1231	2009/2010 season (100%)	0	191	0	0	0
42	GER	Annette Dytrt	1231	2008/2009 season (100%)	446	0	0	203	0
42	GER	Annette Dytrt	1231	2007/2008 season (70%)	264	0	0	127	0
43	KOR	Na-Young Kim	1220	2009/2010 season (100%)	192	0	0	203	0
43	KOR	Na-Young Kim	1220	2008/2009 season (100%)	222	0	0	225	0
43	KOR	Na-Young Kim	1220	2007/2008 season (70%)	428	142	0	0	0
43	CAN	Amelie Lacoste	1220	2009/2010 season (100%)	446	236	213	0	0
43	CAN	Amelie Lacoste	1220	2008/2009 season (100%)	325	0	0	0	0
43	CAN	Amelie Lacoste	1220	2007/2008 season (70%)	0	0	0	0	0
45	USA	Angela Maxwell	1198	2009/2010 season (100%)	0	354	225	0	0
45	USA	Angela Maxwell	1198	2008/2009 season (100%)	0	394	225	0	0
45	USA	Angela Maxwell	1198	2007/2008 season (70%)	0	142	0	0	0
46	JPN	Yukiko Fujisawa	1197	2009/2010 season (100%)	0	182	0	225	0
46	JPN	Yukiko Fujisawa	1197	2008/2009 season (100%)	0	540	250	0	0
46	JPN	Yukiko Fujisawa	1197	2007/2008 season (70%)	0	0	0	0	0
47	USA	Kristine Musademba	1160	2009/2010 season (100%)	0	250	97	0	0
47	USA	Kristine Musademba	1160	2008/2009 season (100%)	0	354	250	0	0
47	USA	Kristine Musademba	1160	2007/2008 season (70%)	0	306	158	0	0
48	USA	Beatrisa Liang	1123	2009/2010 season (100%)	0	0	0	0	0
48	USA	Beatrisa Liang	1123	2008/2009 season (100%)	0	262	236	0	0
48	USA	Beatrisa Liang	1123	2007/2008 season (70%)	326	165	134	0	0
49	RUS	Anna Ovcharova	1088	2009/2010 season (100%)	469	394	225	0	0
49	RUS	Anna Ovcharova	1088	2008/2009 season (100%)	0	0	0	0	0
49	RUS	Anna Ovcharova	1088	2007/2008 season (70%)	0	0	0	0	0
50	ESP	Sonia Lafuente	1045	2009/2010 season (100%)	162	0	0	0	0
50	ESP	Sonia Lafuente	1045	2008/2009 season (100%)	97	148	108	164	164
50	ESP	Sonia Lafuente	1045	2007/2008 season (70%)	157	142	0	0	0
51	USA	Christina Gao	1031	2009/2010 season (100%)	342	486	203	0	0
51	USA	Christina Gao	1031	2008/2009 season (100%)	0	0	0	0	0
51	USA	Christina Gao	1031	2007/2008 season (70%)	0	0	0	0	0
52	CAN	Myriane Samson	1008	2009/2010 season (100%)	402	0	0	182	0
52	CAN	Myriane Samson	1008	2008/2009 season (100%)	0	0	0	0	0
52	CAN	Myriane Samson	1008	2007/2008 season (70%)	194	115	115	0	0
53	FIN	Jenni Vã„Hã„Maa	974	2009/2010 season (100%)	0	0	0	0	0
53	FIN	Jenni Vã„Hã„Maa	974	2008/2009 season (100%)	0	0	0	0	0
53	FIN	Jenni Vã„Hã„Maa	974	2007/2008 season (70%)	365	276	158	175	0
54	CHN	Yan Liu	973	2009/2010 season (100%)	264	213	0	203	0
54	CHN	Yan Liu	973	2008/2009 season (100%)	293	0	0	0	0
54	CHN	Yan Liu	973	2007/2008 season (70%)	150	0	0	0	0
55	USA	Becky Bereswill	967	2009/2010 season (100%)	0	0	0	0	0
55	USA	Becky Bereswill	967	2008/2009 season (100%)	0	600	225	0	0
55	USA	Becky Bereswill	967	2007/2008 season (70%)	0	0	0	142	0
56	CAN	Mira Leung	965	2009/2010 season (100%)	0	0	0	0	0
56	CAN	Mira Leung	965	2008/2009 season (100%)	0	213	0	0	0
56	CAN	Mira Leung	965	2007/2008 season (70%)	386	183	183	0	0
57	USA	Kiri Baga	949	2009/2010 season (100%)	380	319	250	0	0
57	USA	Kiri Baga	949	2008/2009 season (100%)	0	0	0	0	0
57	USA	Kiri Baga	949	2007/2008 season (70%)	0	0	0	0	0
57	ITA	Francesca Rio	949	2009/2010 season (100%)	97	0	0	0	0
57	ITA	Francesca Rio	949	2008/2009 season (100%)	249	0	0	225	203
57	ITA	Francesca Rio	949	2007/2008 season (70%)	0	0	0	175	0
59	RUS	Polina Agafonova	930	2009/2010 season (100%)	579	203	148	0	0
59	RUS	Polina Agafonova	930	2008/2009 season (100%)	0	0	0	0	0
59	RUS	Polina Agafonova	930	2007/2008 season (70%)	0	0	0	0	0
60	RUS	Oksana Gozeva	890	2009/2010 season (100%)	237	0	0	0	0
60	RUS	Oksana Gozeva	890	2008/2009 season (100%)	308	225	120	0	0
60	RUS	Oksana Gozeva	890	2007/2008 season (70%)	0	0	0	0	0
61	FRA	Candice Didier	875	2009/2010 season (100%)	0	0	0	0	0
61	FRA	Candice Didier	875	2008/2009 season (100%)	237	292	0	182	164
61	FRA	Candice Didier	875	2007/2008 season (70%)	0	0	0	0	0
62	KOR	Min-Jung Kwak	845	2009/2010 season (100%)	496	0	0	0	0
62	KOR	Min-Jung Kwak	845	2008/2009 season (100%)	78	203	0	0	0
62	KOR	Min-Jung Kwak	845	2007/2008 season (70%)	0	68	0	0	0
63	SLO	Teodora Postic	836	2009/2010 season (100%)	126	0	0	164	0
63	SLO	Teodora Postic	836	2008/2009 season (100%)	140	0	0	164	0
63	SLO	Teodora Postic	836	2007/2008 season (70%)	0	0	0	127	115
64	ISR	Tamar Katz	827	2009/2010 season (100%)	102	0	0	182	164
64	ISR	Tamar Katz	827	2008/2009 season (100%)	0	0	0	182	0
64	ISR	Tamar Katz	827	2007/2008 season (70%)	121	76	0	0	0
65	GER	Isabel Drescher	812	2009/2010 season (100%)	119	108	0	0	0
65	GER	Isabel Drescher	812	2008/2009 season (100%)	277	120	0	0	0
65	GER	Isabel Drescher	812	2007/2008 season (70%)	0	104	84	0	0
66	EST	Svetlana Issakova	769	2009/2010 season (100%)	224	0	0	0	0
66	EST	Svetlana Issakova	769	2008/2009 season (100%)	164	0	0	0	0
66	EST	Svetlana Issakova	769	2007/2008 season (70%)	0	223	158	0	0
67	CAN	Kate Charbonneau	767	2009/2010 season (100%)	422	225	120	0	0
67	CAN	Kate Charbonneau	767	2008/2009 season (100%)	0	0	0	0	0
67	CAN	Kate Charbonneau	767	2007/2008 season (70%)	0	0	0	0	0
68	AUT	Miriam Ziegler	760	2009/2010 season (100%)	0	0	0	182	0
68	AUT	Miriam Ziegler	760	2008/2009 season (100%)	182	133	0	0	0
68	AUT	Miriam Ziegler	760	2007/2008 season (70%)	75	104	84	0	0
69	UZB	Anastasia Gimazetdinova	748	2009/2010 season (100%)	293	0	0	0	0
69	UZB	Anastasia Gimazetdinova	748	2008/2009 season (100%)	264	191	0	0	0
69	UZB	Anastasia Gimazetdinova	748	2007/2008 season (70%)	253	0	0	0	0
70	KOR	Hyeon-Jung Kim	717	2009/2010 season (100%)	0	0	0	0	0
70	KOR	Hyeon-Jung Kim	717	2008/2009 season (100%)	214	97	0	203	0
70	KOR	Hyeon-Jung Kim	717	2007/2008 season (70%)	127	76	0	0	0
71	JPN	Rumi Suizu	709	2009/2010 season (100%)	0	0	0	0	0
71	JPN	Rumi Suizu	709	2008/2009 season (100%)	0	225	97	0	0
71	JPN	Rumi Suizu	709	2007/2008 season (70%)	103	142	142	0	0
72	AUS	Cheltzie Lee	707	2009/2010 season (100%)	222	133	0	0	0
72	AUS	Cheltzie Lee	707	2008/2009 season (100%)	237	0	0	0	0
72	AUS	Cheltzie Lee	707	2007/2008 season (70%)	49	115	0	0	0
73	RUS	Ekaterina Kozireva	706	2009/2010 season (100%)	0	164	133	225	0
73	RUS	Ekaterina Kozireva	706	2008/2009 season (100%)	0	108	0	0	0
73	RUS	Ekaterina Kozireva	706	2007/2008 season (70%)	0	76	76	0	0
74	AUT	Kerstin Frank	695	2009/2010 season (100%)	0	0	0	225	225
74	AUT	Kerstin Frank	695	2008/2009 season (100%)	118	0	0	0	0
74	AUT	Kerstin Frank	695	2007/2008 season (70%)	0	0	0	127	0
75	JPN	Shoko Ishikawa	682	2009/2010 season (100%)	0	0	0	203	0
75	JPN	Shoko Ishikawa	682	2008/2009 season (100%)	0	182	182	0	0
75	JPN	Shoko Ishikawa	682	2007/2008 season (70%)	0	115	0	0	0
76	USA	Agnes Zawadzki	644	2009/2010 season (100%)	644	0	0	0	0
76	USA	Agnes Zawadzki	644	2008/2009 season (100%)	0	0	0	0	0
76	USA	Agnes Zawadzki	644	2007/2008 season (70%)	0	0	0	0	0
77	FRA	Maé-Bérénice Méité	640	2009/2010 season (100%)	0	148	0	0	0
77	FRA	Maé-Bérénice Méité	640	2008/2009 season (100%)	224	148	120	0	0
77	FRA	Maé-Bérénice Méité	640	2007/2008 season (70%)	0	0	0	0	0
78	USA	Emily Hughes	621	2009/2010 season (100%)	0	213	0	0	0
78	USA	Emily Hughes	621	2008/2009 season (100%)	0	0	0	0	0
78	USA	Emily Hughes	621	2007/2008 season (70%)	0	204	204	0	0
79	FRA	Lena Marrocco	607	2009/2010 season (100%)	249	108	0	250	0
79	FRA	Lena Marrocco	607	2008/2009 season (100%)	0	0	0	0	0
79	FRA	Lena Marrocco	607	2007/2008 season (70%)	0	0	0	0	0
80	SWE	Linnea Mellgren	596	2009/2010 season (100%)	0	0	0	164	164
80	SWE	Linnea Mellgren	596	2008/2009 season (100%)	0	0	0	164	0
80	SWE	Linnea Mellgren	596	2007/2008 season (70%)	0	104	0	0	0
80	JPN	Satsuki Muramoto	596	2009/2010 season (100%)	0	0	0	225	0
80	JPN	Satsuki Muramoto	596	2008/2009 season (100%)	0	120	0	0	0
80	JPN	Satsuki Muramoto	596	2007/2008 season (70%)	0	158	93	0	0
82	CHN	Binshu Xu	594	2009/2010 season (100%)	102	0	0	0	0
82	CHN	Binshu Xu	594	2008/2009 season (100%)	192	236	0	0	0
82	CHN	Binshu Xu	594	2007/2008 season (70%)	166	0	0	0	0
83	POL	Anna Jurkiewicz	584	2009/2010 season (100%)	0	0	0	0	0
83	POL	Anna Jurkiewicz	584	2008/2009 season (100%)	180	0	0	0	0
83	POL	Anna Jurkiewicz	584	2007/2008 season (70%)	88	0	0	158	158
84	HUN	Viktória Pavuk	527	2009/2010 season (100%)	0	0	0	0	0
84	HUN	Viktória Pavuk	527	2008/2009 season (100%)	0	0	0	203	0
84	HUN	Viktória Pavuk	527	2007/2008 season (70%)	0	149	0	175	0
85	CZE	Nella Simaova	509	2009/2010 season (100%)	0	0	0	0	0
85	CZE	Nella Simaova	509	2008/2009 season (100%)	214	0	0	0	0
85	CZE	Nella Simaova	509	2007/2008 season (70%)	134	93	68	0	0
86	NED	Manouk Gijsman	500	2009/2010 season (100%)	106	120	0	0	0
86	NED	Manouk Gijsman	500	2008/2009 season (100%)	92	0	0	182	0
86	NED	Manouk Gijsman	500	2007/2008 season (70%)	0	0	0	0	0
87	NZL	Alexandra Rout	494	2009/2010 season (100%)	0	0	0	182	0
87	NZL	Alexandra Rout	494	2008/2009 season (100%)	0	164	0	0	0
87	NZL	Alexandra Rout	494	2007/2008 season (70%)	55	93	0	0	0
88	USA	Ellie Kawamura	490	2009/2010 season (100%)	0	287	203	0	0
88	USA	Ellie Kawamura	490	2008/2009 season (100%)	0	0	0	0	0
88	USA	Ellie Kawamura	490	2007/2008 season (70%)	0	0	0	0	0
89	GER	Sandy Hoffmann	479	2009/2010 season (100%)	0	182	0	0	0
89	GER	Sandy Hoffmann	479	2008/2009 season (100%)	0	164	133	0	0
89	GER	Sandy Hoffmann	479	2007/2008 season (70%)	0	0	0	0	0
90	MEX	Ana Cecilia Cantu	476	2009/2010 season (100%)	156	0	0	0	0
90	MEX	Ana Cecilia Cantu	476	2008/2009 season (100%)	156	0	0	164	0
90	MEX	Ana Cecilia Cantu	476	2007/2008 season (70%)	98	0	0	0	0
91	USA	Melissa Bulanhagui	473	2009/2010 season (100%)	0	0	0	0	0
91	USA	Melissa Bulanhagui	473	2008/2009 season (100%)	0	250	108	0	0
91	USA	Melissa Bulanhagui	473	2007/2008 season (70%)	0	115	0	0	0
92	UKR	Irina Movchan	466	2009/2010 season (100%)	0	0	0	0	0
92	UKR	Irina Movchan	466	2008/2009 season (100%)	126	0	0	225	0
92	UKR	Irina Movchan	466	2007/2008 season (70%)	0	0	0	115	0
93	GER	Constanze Paulinus	453	2009/2010 season (100%)	0	0	0	0	0
93	GER	Constanze Paulinus	453	2008/2009 season (100%)	0	0	0	250	203
93	GER	Constanze Paulinus	453	2007/2008 season (70%)	0	0	0	0	0
94	FRA	Gwendoline Didier	431	2009/2010 season (100%)	0	0	0	0	0
94	FRA	Gwendoline Didier	431	2008/2009 season (100%)	0	0	0	182	0
94	FRA	Gwendoline Didier	431	2007/2008 season (70%)	0	134	0	115	0
94	SWE	Isabelle M. Olsson	431	2009/2010 season (100%)	0	203	108	0	0
94	SWE	Isabelle M. Olsson	431	2008/2009 season (100%)	0	120	0	0	0
94	SWE	Isabelle M. Olsson	431	2007/2008 season (70%)	0	0	0	0	0
96	TUR	Sıla Saygı	427	2009/2010 season (100%)	182	148	97	0	0
96	TUR	Sıla Saygı	427	2008/2009 season (100%)	0	0	0	0	0
96	TUR	Sıla Saygı	427	2007/2008 season (70%)	0	0	0	0	0
97	BEL	Isabelle Pieman	419	2009/2010 season (100%)	0	0	0	203	0
97	BEL	Isabelle Pieman	419	2008/2009 season (100%)	74	0	0	0	0
97	BEL	Isabelle Pieman	419	2007/2008 season (70%)	0	0	0	142	0
98	JPN	Ayane Nakamura	418	2009/2010 season (100%)	0	0	0	0	0
98	JPN	Ayane Nakamura	418	2008/2009 season (100%)	0	164	0	0	0
98	JPN	Ayane Nakamura	418	2007/2008 season (70%)	0	127	127	0	0
99	CHN	Qiuying Zhu	409	2009/2010 season (100%)	107	182	120	0	0
99	CHN	Qiuying Zhu	409	2008/2009 season (100%)	0	0	0	0	0
99	CHN	Qiuying Zhu	409	2007/2008 season (70%)	0	0	0	0	0
100	GER	Julia Pfrengle	397	2009/2010 season (100%)	277	120	0	0	0
100	GER	Julia Pfrengle	397	2008/2009 season (100%)	0	0	0	0	0
100	GER	Julia Pfrengle	397	2007/2008 season (70%)	0	0	0	0	0
101	CAN	Alexandra Najarro	394	2009/2010 season (100%)	0	97	0	0	0
101	CAN	Alexandra Najarro	394	2008/2009 season (100%)	0	164	133	0	0
101	CAN	Alexandra Najarro	394	2007/2008 season (70%)	0	0	0	0	0
102	JPN	Nana Takeda	392	2009/2010 season (100%)	0	0	0	0	0
102	JPN	Nana Takeda	392	2008/2009 season (100%)	0	0	0	0	0
102	JPN	Nana Takeda	392	2007/2008 season (70%)	0	227	165	0	0
103	CAN	Rylie McCulloch-Casarsa	389	2009/2010 season (100%)	0	108	0	0	0
103	CAN	Rylie McCulloch-Casarsa	389	2008/2009 season (100%)	0	148	133	0	0
103	CAN	Rylie McCulloch-Casarsa	389	2007/2008 season (70%)	0	0	0	0	0
104	JPN	Kana Muramoto	385	2009/2010 season (100%)	0	0	0	182	0
104	JPN	Kana Muramoto	385	2008/2009 season (100%)	0	203	0	0	0
104	JPN	Kana Muramoto	385	2007/2008 season (70%)	0	0	0	0	0
105	DEN	Karina Johnson	377	2009/2010 season (100%)	147	0	0	0	0
105	DEN	Karina Johnson	377	2008/2009 season (100%)	0	133	97	0	0
105	DEN	Karina Johnson	377	2007/2008 season (70%)	0	0	0	0	0
106	USA	Chrissy Hughes	376	2009/2010 season (100%)	0	0	0	0	0
106	USA	Chrissy Hughes	376	2008/2009 season (100%)	0	0	0	0	0
106	USA	Chrissy Hughes	376	2007/2008 season (70%)	0	201	175	0	0
107	SUI	Romy Bãœhler	366	2009/2010 season (100%)	202	0	0	164	0
107	SUI	Romy Bãœhler	366	2008/2009 season (100%)	0	0	0	0	0
107	SUI	Romy Bãœhler	366	2007/2008 season (70%)	0	0	0	0	0
108	JPN	Yuka Ishikawa	359	2009/2010 season (100%)	0	0	0	0	0
108	JPN	Yuka Ishikawa	359	2008/2009 season (100%)	0	148	0	0	0
108	JPN	Yuka Ishikawa	359	2007/2008 season (70%)	0	127	84	0	0
109	SWE	Rebecka Emanuelsson	358	2009/2010 season (100%)	0	97	0	0	0
109	SWE	Rebecka Emanuelsson	358	2008/2009 season (100%)	0	164	97	0	0
109	SWE	Rebecka Emanuelsson	358	2007/2008 season (70%)	0	0	0	0	0
109	KOR	Chae-Hwa Kim	358	2009/2010 season (100%)	237	0	0	0	0
109	KOR	Chae-Hwa Kim	358	2008/2009 season (100%)	0	0	0	0	0
109	KOR	Chae-Hwa Kim	358	2007/2008 season (70%)	121	0	0	0	0
111	SWE	Angelica Olsson	357	2009/2010 season (100%)	132	0	0	225	0
111	SWE	Angelica Olsson	357	2008/2009 season (100%)	0	0	0	0	0
111	SWE	Angelica Olsson	357	2007/2008 season (70%)	0	0	0	0	0
112	ROU	Roxana Luca	348	2009/2010 season (100%)	0	0	0	0	0
112	ROU	Roxana Luca	348	2008/2009 season (100%)	0	0	0	0	0
112	ROU	Roxana Luca	348	2007/2008 season (70%)	64	0	0	142	142
113	GER	Katharina Hã„Cker	346	2009/2010 season (100%)	0	0	0	164	0
113	GER	Katharina Hã„Cker	346	2008/2009 season (100%)	0	0	0	182	0
113	GER	Katharina Hã„Cker	346	2007/2008 season (70%)	0	0	0	0	0
113	USA	Brittney Rizo	346	2009/2010 season (100%)	0	0	0	0	0
113	USA	Brittney Rizo	346	2008/2009 season (100%)	0	182	164	0	0
113	USA	Brittney Rizo	346	2007/2008 season (70%)	0	0	0	0	0
115	GER	Shira Willner	340	2009/2010 season (100%)	74	133	133	0	0
115	GER	Shira Willner	340	2008/2009 season (100%)	0	0	0	0	0
115	GER	Shira Willner	340	2007/2008 season (70%)	0	0	0	0	0
116	ITA	Roberta Rodeghiero	315	2009/2010 season (100%)	0	0	0	182	0
116	ITA	Roberta Rodeghiero	315	2008/2009 season (100%)	0	133	0	0	0
116	ITA	Roberta Rodeghiero	315	2007/2008 season (70%)	0	0	0	0	0
116	KOR	Na-Hee Sin	315	2009/2010 season (100%)	0	0	0	0	0
116	KOR	Na-Hee Sin	315	2008/2009 season (100%)	0	108	0	0	0
116	KOR	Na-Hee Sin	315	2007/2008 season (70%)	92	115	0	0	0
118	AUT	Belinda Schã–Nberger	313	2009/2010 season (100%)	0	108	0	0	0
118	AUT	Belinda Schã–Nberger	313	2008/2009 season (100%)	0	108	97	0	0
118	AUT	Belinda Schã–Nberger	313	2007/2008 season (70%)	0	0	0	0	0
119	RUS	Rosa Sheveleva	312	2009/2010 season (100%)	0	164	148	0	0
119	RUS	Rosa Sheveleva	312	2008/2009 season (100%)	0	0	0	0	0
119	RUS	Rosa Sheveleva	312	2007/2008 season (70%)	0	0	0	0	0
120	CZE	Martina Bocek	309	2009/2010 season (100%)	0	0	0	0	0
120	CZE	Martina Bocek	309	2008/2009 season (100%)	0	0	0	182	0
120	CZE	Martina Bocek	309	2007/2008 season (70%)	0	0	0	127	0
121	CHN	Bingwa Geng	300	2009/2010 season (100%)	0	0	0	0	0
121	CHN	Bingwa Geng	300	2008/2009 season (100%)	119	120	0	0	0
121	CHN	Bingwa Geng	300	2007/2008 season (70%)	61	0	0	0	0
122	EST	Jasmine Alexandra Costa	284	2009/2010 season (100%)	0	164	0	0	0
122	EST	Jasmine Alexandra Costa	284	2008/2009 season (100%)	0	120	0	0	0
122	EST	Jasmine Alexandra Costa	284	2007/2008 season (70%)	0	0	0	0	0
123	MEX	Loretta Hamui	277	2009/2010 season (100%)	0	0	0	0	0
123	MEX	Loretta Hamui	277	2008/2009 season (100%)	92	0	0	0	0
123	MEX	Loretta Hamui	277	2007/2008 season (70%)	109	76	0	0	0
123	NED	Karen Venhuizen	277	2009/2010 season (100%)	0	0	0	0	0
123	NED	Karen Venhuizen	277	2008/2009 season (100%)	0	0	0	0	0
123	NED	Karen Venhuizen	277	2007/2008 season (70%)	150	0	0	127	0
125	RUS	Nina Petushkova	274	2009/2010 season (100%)	0	0	0	0	0
125	RUS	Nina Petushkova	274	2008/2009 season (100%)	0	0	0	0	0
125	RUS	Nina Petushkova	274	2007/2008 season (70%)	109	165	0	0	0
126	BUL	Hristina Vassileva	269	2009/2010 season (100%)	0	0	0	0	0
126	BUL	Hristina Vassileva	269	2008/2009 season (100%)	0	0	0	0	0
126	BUL	Hristina Vassileva	269	2007/2008 season (70%)	0	0	0	142	127
127	SWE	Malin Magnusson-Ruf	268	2009/2010 season (100%)	0	148	120	0	0
127	SWE	Malin Magnusson-Ruf	268	2008/2009 season (100%)	0	0	0	0	0
127	SWE	Malin Magnusson-Ruf	268	2007/2008 season (70%)	0	0	0	0	0
127	CHN	Yueren Wang	268	2009/2010 season (100%)	0	0	0	0	0
127	CHN	Yueren Wang	268	2008/2009 season (100%)	83	0	0	0	0
127	CHN	Yueren Wang	268	2007/2008 season (70%)	185	0	0	0	0
129	EST	Olga Ikonnikova	263	2009/2010 season (100%)	0	0	0	0	0
129	EST	Olga Ikonnikova	263	2008/2009 season (100%)	0	0	0	0	0
129	EST	Olga Ikonnikova	263	2007/2008 season (70%)	52	84	0	127	0
130	USA	Blake Rosenthal	262	2009/2010 season (100%)	0	0	0	0	0
130	USA	Blake Rosenthal	262	2008/2009 season (100%)	0	0	0	0	0
130	USA	Blake Rosenthal	262	2007/2008 season (70%)	0	158	104	0	0
131	TPE	Melinda Wang	260	2009/2010 season (100%)	126	0	0	0	0
131	TPE	Melinda Wang	260	2008/2009 season (100%)	0	0	0	0	0
131	TPE	Melinda Wang	260	2007/2008 season (70%)	134	0	0	0	0
132	FIN	Sofia Otala	259	2009/2010 season (100%)	0	0	0	0	0
132	FIN	Sofia Otala	259	2008/2009 season (100%)	0	0	0	0	0
132	FIN	Sofia Otala	259	2007/2008 season (70%)	68	115	76	0	0
133	FRA	Julie Cagnon	258	2009/2010 season (100%)	0	0	0	0	0
133	FRA	Julie Cagnon	258	2008/2009 season (100%)	0	97	0	0	0
133	FRA	Julie Cagnon	258	2007/2008 season (70%)	0	93	68	0	0
134	RUS	Ksenia Doronina	253	2009/2010 season (100%)	0	0	0	0	0
134	RUS	Ksenia Doronina	253	2008/2009 season (100%)	0	0	0	0	0
134	RUS	Ksenia Doronina	253	2007/2008 season (70%)	253	0	0	0	0
135	RSA	Lejeanne Marais	252	2009/2010 season (100%)	173	0	0	0	0
135	RSA	Lejeanne Marais	252	2008/2009 season (100%)	0	0	0	0	0
135	RSA	Lejeanne Marais	252	2007/2008 season (70%)	79	0	0	0	0
136	GER	Katharina Gierok	251	2009/2010 season (100%)	0	0	0	0	0
136	GER	Katharina Gierok	251	2008/2009 season (100%)	0	0	0	0	0
136	GER	Katharina Gierok	251	2007/2008 season (70%)	0	76	0	175	0
137	JPN	Shion Kokubun	250	2009/2010 season (100%)	0	0	0	250	0
137	JPN	Shion Kokubun	250	2008/2009 season (100%)	0	0	0	0	0
137	JPN	Shion Kokubun	250	2007/2008 season (70%)	0	0	0	0	0
137	JPN	Mutsumi Takayama	250	2009/2010 season (100%)	0	0	0	250	0
137	JPN	Mutsumi Takayama	250	2008/2009 season (100%)	0	0	0	0	0
137	JPN	Mutsumi Takayama	250	2007/2008 season (70%)	0	0	0	0	0
139	RUS	Jana Smekhnova	246	2009/2010 season (100%)	0	0	0	0	0
139	RUS	Jana Smekhnova	246	2008/2009 season (100%)	0	0	0	0	0
139	RUS	Jana Smekhnova	246	2007/2008 season (70%)	0	142	104	0	0
140	FRA	Yretha Silete	245	2009/2010 season (100%)	0	148	97	0	0
140	FRA	Yretha Silete	245	2008/2009 season (100%)	0	0	0	0	0
140	FRA	Yretha Silete	245	2007/2008 season (70%)	0	0	0	0	0
141	SVK	Monika Simancikova	230	2009/2010 season (100%)	0	133	97	0	0
141	SVK	Monika Simancikova	230	2008/2009 season (100%)	0	0	0	0	0
141	SVK	Monika Simancikova	230	2007/2008 season (70%)	0	0	0	0	0
142	MEX	Michele Cantu	229	2009/2010 season (100%)	0	0	0	0	0
142	MEX	Michele Cantu	229	2008/2009 season (100%)	102	0	0	0	0
142	MEX	Michele Cantu	229	2007/2008 season (70%)	0	0	0	127	0
143	AUS	Tina Wang	228	2009/2010 season (100%)	0	0	0	0	0
143	AUS	Tina Wang	228	2008/2009 season (100%)	140	0	0	0	0
143	AUS	Tina Wang	228	2007/2008 season (70%)	88	0	0	0	0
144	RUS	Sofia Biryukova	225	2009/2010 season (100%)	0	225	0	0	0
144	RUS	Sofia Biryukova	225	2008/2009 season (100%)	0	0	0	0	0
144	RUS	Sofia Biryukova	225	2007/2008 season (70%)	0	0	0	0	0
144	JPN	Mari Suzuki	225	2009/2010 season (100%)	0	0	0	225	0
144	JPN	Mari Suzuki	225	2008/2009 season (100%)	0	0	0	0	0
144	JPN	Mari Suzuki	225	2007/2008 season (70%)	0	0	0	0	0
146	JPN	Nanoha Sato	201	2009/2010 season (100%)	0	0	0	0	0
146	JPN	Nanoha Sato	201	2008/2009 season (100%)	0	97	0	0	0
146	JPN	Nanoha Sato	201	2007/2008 season (70%)	0	104	0	0	0
147	HKG	Tamami Ono	196	2009/2010 season (100%)	83	0	0	0	0
147	HKG	Tamami Ono	196	2008/2009 season (100%)	113	0	0	0	0
147	HKG	Tamami Ono	196	2007/2008 season (70%)	71	0	0	0	0
148	UKR	Eleonora Vinnichenko	190	2009/2010 season (100%)	0	0	0	0	0
148	UKR	Eleonora Vinnichenko	190	2008/2009 season (100%)	107	0	0	0	0
148	UKR	Eleonora Vinnichenko	190	2007/2008 season (70%)	83	0	0	0	0
149	GBR	Karly Robertson	185	2009/2010 season (100%)	83	0	0	0	0
149	GBR	Karly Robertson	185	2008/2009 season (100%)	102	0	0	0	0
149	GBR	Karly Robertson	185	2007/2008 season (70%)	0	0	0	0	0
150	LAT	Alina Fjodorova	183	2009/2010 season (100%)	63	120	0	0	0
150	LAT	Alina Fjodorova	183	2008/2009 season (100%)	0	0	0	0	0
150	LAT	Alina Fjodorova	183	2007/2008 season (70%)	0	0	0	0	0
151	RUS	Maria Artemieva	182	2009/2010 season (100%)	0	182	0	0	0
151	RUS	Maria Artemieva	182	2008/2009 season (100%)	0	0	0	0	0
151	RUS	Maria Artemieva	182	2007/2008 season (70%)	0	0	0	0	0
151	CZE	Ivana Buzkova	182	2009/2010 season (100%)	0	0	0	0	0
151	CZE	Ivana Buzkova	182	2008/2009 season (100%)	0	0	0	182	0
151	CZE	Ivana Buzkova	182	2007/2008 season (70%)	0	0	0	0	0
151	ITA	Alice Garlisi	182	2009/2010 season (100%)	0	182	0	0	0
151	ITA	Alice Garlisi	182	2008/2009 season (100%)	0	0	0	0	0
151	ITA	Alice Garlisi	182	2007/2008 season (70%)	0	0	0	0	0
151	USA	Kristiene Gong	182	2009/2010 season (100%)	0	182	0	0	0
151	USA	Kristiene Gong	182	2008/2009 season (100%)	0	0	0	0	0
151	USA	Kristiene Gong	182	2007/2008 season (70%)	0	0	0	0	0
151	SUI	Nicole Graf	182	2009/2010 season (100%)	0	0	0	0	0
151	SUI	Nicole Graf	182	2008/2009 season (100%)	0	0	0	182	0
151	SUI	Nicole Graf	182	2007/2008 season (70%)	0	0	0	0	0
151	JPN	Roannasari Oshikawa	182	2009/2010 season (100%)	0	0	0	182	0
151	JPN	Roannasari Oshikawa	182	2008/2009 season (100%)	0	0	0	0	0
151	JPN	Roannasari Oshikawa	182	2007/2008 season (70%)	0	0	0	0	0
151	FIN	Minna Parviainen	182	2009/2010 season (100%)	0	0	0	182	0
151	FIN	Minna Parviainen	182	2008/2009 season (100%)	0	0	0	0	0
151	FIN	Minna Parviainen	182	2007/2008 season (70%)	0	0	0	0	0
151	RUS	Evgania Tarasova	182	2009/2010 season (100%)	0	0	0	0	0
151	RUS	Evgania Tarasova	182	2008/2009 season (100%)	0	182	0	0	0
151	RUS	Evgania Tarasova	182	2007/2008 season (70%)	0	0	0	0	0
151	CAN	Cecylia Witkowski	182	2009/2010 season (100%)	0	0	0	0	0
151	CAN	Cecylia Witkowski	182	2008/2009 season (100%)	0	182	0	0	0
151	CAN	Cecylia Witkowski	182	2007/2008 season (70%)	0	0	0	0	0
160	CAN	Kathryn Kang	180	2009/2010 season (100%)	0	0	0	0	0
160	CAN	Kathryn Kang	180	2008/2009 season (100%)	87	0	0	0	0
160	CAN	Kathryn Kang	180	2007/2008 season (70%)	0	93	0	0	0
161	FRA	Chloe Depouilly	175	2009/2010 season (100%)	0	0	0	0	0
161	FRA	Chloe Depouilly	175	2008/2009 season (100%)	0	0	0	0	0
161	FRA	Chloe Depouilly	175	2007/2008 season (70%)	0	0	0	175	0
162	NZL	Morgan Figgins	164	2009/2010 season (100%)	0	0	0	164	0
162	NZL	Morgan Figgins	164	2008/2009 season (100%)	0	0	0	0	0
162	NZL	Morgan Figgins	164	2007/2008 season (70%)	0	0	0	0	0
162	USA	Taylor Firth	164	2009/2010 season (100%)	0	164	0	0	0
162	USA	Taylor Firth	164	2008/2009 season (100%)	0	0	0	0	0
162	USA	Taylor Firth	164	2007/2008 season (70%)	0	0	0	0	0
162	CAN	Vanessa Grenier	164	2009/2010 season (100%)	0	164	0	0	0
162	CAN	Vanessa Grenier	164	2008/2009 season (100%)	0	0	0	0	0
162	CAN	Vanessa Grenier	164	2007/2008 season (70%)	0	0	0	0	0
162	SVK	Alexandra Kunova	164	2009/2010 season (100%)	0	0	0	0	0
162	SVK	Alexandra Kunova	164	2008/2009 season (100%)	0	0	0	164	0
162	SVK	Alexandra Kunova	164	2007/2008 season (70%)	0	0	0	0	0
162	PUR	Victoria Muniz	164	2009/2010 season (100%)	0	0	0	164	0
162	PUR	Victoria Muniz	164	2008/2009 season (100%)	0	0	0	0	0
162	PUR	Victoria Muniz	164	2007/2008 season (70%)	0	0	0	0	0
162	FIN	Beata Papp	164	2009/2010 season (100%)	164	0	0	0	0
162	FIN	Beata Papp	164	2008/2009 season (100%)	0	0	0	0	0
162	FIN	Beata Papp	164	2007/2008 season (70%)	0	0	0	0	0
162	RUS	Evgenia Pochufarova	164	2009/2010 season (100%)	0	0	0	0	0
162	RUS	Evgenia Pochufarova	164	2008/2009 season (100%)	0	164	0	0	0
162	RUS	Evgenia Pochufarova	164	2007/2008 season (70%)	0	0	0	0	0
162	USA	Karen Zhou	164	2009/2010 season (100%)	0	164	0	0	0
162	USA	Karen Zhou	164	2008/2009 season (100%)	0	0	0	0	0
162	USA	Karen Zhou	164	2007/2008 season (70%)	0	0	0	0	0
170	BUL	Sonia Radeva	158	2009/2010 season (100%)	0	0	0	0	0
170	BUL	Sonia Radeva	158	2008/2009 season (100%)	0	0	0	0	0
170	BUL	Sonia Radeva	158	2007/2008 season (70%)	0	0	0	158	0
170	GER	Mira Sonnenberg	158	2009/2010 season (100%)	0	0	0	0	0
170	GER	Mira Sonnenberg	158	2008/2009 season (100%)	0	0	0	0	0
170	GER	Mira Sonnenberg	158	2007/2008 season (70%)	0	0	0	158	0
170	PUR	Megan Williams Stewart	158	2009/2010 season (100%)	0	0	0	0	0
170	PUR	Megan Williams Stewart	158	2008/2009 season (100%)	0	0	0	0	0
170	PUR	Megan Williams Stewart	158	2007/2008 season (70%)	0	0	0	158	0
173	BLR	Katsiarina Pakhamovich	155	2009/2010 season (100%)	92	0	0	0	0
173	BLR	Katsiarina Pakhamovich	155	2008/2009 season (100%)	63	0	0	0	0
173	BLR	Katsiarina Pakhamovich	155	2007/2008 season (70%)	0	0	0	0	0
174	RUS	Alexandra Ievleva	149	2009/2010 season (100%)	0	0	0	0	0
174	RUS	Alexandra Ievleva	149	2008/2009 season (100%)	0	0	0	0	0
174	RUS	Alexandra Ievleva	149	2007/2008 season (70%)	0	149	0	0	0
175	CHN	Zhenni Ruan	148	2009/2010 season (100%)	0	0	0	0	0
175	CHN	Zhenni Ruan	148	2008/2009 season (100%)	0	148	0	0	0
175	CHN	Zhenni Ruan	148	2007/2008 season (70%)	0	0	0	0	0
175	USA	Marissa Secundy	148	2009/2010 season (100%)	0	0	0	0	0
175	USA	Marissa Secundy	148	2008/2009 season (100%)	0	148	0	0	0
175	USA	Marissa Secundy	148	2007/2008 season (70%)	0	0	0	0	0
175	CAN	Dana Zhalko-Tytarenko	148	2009/2010 season (100%)	0	0	0	0	0
175	CAN	Dana Zhalko-Tytarenko	148	2008/2009 season (100%)	0	148	0	0	0
175	CAN	Dana Zhalko-Tytarenko	148	2007/2008 season (70%)	0	0	0	0	0
178	FRA	Vanessa James	142	2009/2010 season (100%)	0	0	0	0	0
178	FRA	Vanessa James	142	2008/2009 season (100%)	0	0	0	0	0
178	FRA	Vanessa James	142	2007/2008 season (70%)	0	0	0	142	0
178	THA	Charissa Tansomboon	142	2009/2010 season (100%)	0	0	0	0	0
178	THA	Charissa Tansomboon	142	2008/2009 season (100%)	0	0	0	0	0
178	THA	Charissa Tansomboon	142	2007/2008 season (70%)	58	84	0	0	0
180	TPE	Crystal Kiang	140	2009/2010 season (100%)	140	0	0	0	0
180	TPE	Crystal Kiang	140	2008/2009 season (100%)	0	0	0	0	0
180	TPE	Crystal Kiang	140	2007/2008 season (70%)	0	0	0	0	0
180	UKR	Natalia Popova	140	2009/2010 season (100%)	140	0	0	0	0
180	UKR	Natalia Popova	140	2008/2009 season (100%)	0	0	0	0	0
180	UKR	Natalia Popova	140	2007/2008 season (70%)	0	0	0	0	0
182	PHI	Gracielle Jeanne Tan	138	2009/2010 season (100%)	0	0	0	0	0
182	PHI	Gracielle Jeanne Tan	138	2008/2009 season (100%)	74	0	0	0	0
182	PHI	Gracielle Jeanne Tan	138	2007/2008 season (70%)	64	0	0	0	0
183	JPN	Mai Asada	134	2009/2010 season (100%)	0	0	0	0	0
183	JPN	Mai Asada	134	2008/2009 season (100%)	0	0	0	0	0
183	JPN	Mai Asada	134	2007/2008 season (70%)	0	134	0	0	0
184	EST	Johanna Allik	133	2009/2010 season (100%)	0	0	0	0	0
184	EST	Johanna Allik	133	2008/2009 season (100%)	0	133	0	0	0
184	EST	Johanna Allik	133	2007/2008 season (70%)	0	0	0	0	0
184	USA	Deedee Leng	133	2009/2010 season (100%)	0	133	0	0	0
184	USA	Deedee Leng	133	2008/2009 season (100%)	0	0	0	0	0
184	USA	Deedee Leng	133	2007/2008 season (70%)	0	0	0	0	0
184	CHN	Kexin Zhang	133	2009/2010 season (100%)	0	133	0	0	0
184	CHN	Kexin Zhang	133	2008/2009 season (100%)	0	0	0	0	0
184	CHN	Kexin Zhang	133	2007/2008 season (70%)	0	0	0	0	0
187	TPE	Chaochih Liu	132	2009/2010 season (100%)	0	0	0	0	0
187	TPE	Chaochih Liu	132	2008/2009 season (100%)	132	0	0	0	0
187	TPE	Chaochih Liu	132	2007/2008 season (70%)	0	0	0	0	0
188	CAN	Charlotte Belair	127	2009/2010 season (100%)	0	0	0	0	0
188	CAN	Charlotte Belair	127	2008/2009 season (100%)	0	0	0	0	0
188	CAN	Charlotte Belair	127	2007/2008 season (70%)	0	127	0	0	0
188	JPN	Yukina Ohta	127	2009/2010 season (100%)	0	0	0	0	0
188	JPN	Yukina Ohta	127	2008/2009 season (100%)	0	0	0	0	0
188	JPN	Yukina Ohta	127	2007/2008 season (70%)	0	0	0	127	0
190	SVK	Karolina Sykorova	120	2009/2010 season (100%)	0	120	0	0	0
190	SVK	Karolina Sykorova	120	2008/2009 season (100%)	0	0	0	0	0
190	SVK	Karolina Sykorova	120	2007/2008 season (70%)	0	0	0	0	0
190	USA	Tenile Victorsen	120	2009/2010 season (100%)	0	0	0	0	0
190	USA	Tenile Victorsen	120	2008/2009 season (100%)	0	120	0	0	0
190	USA	Tenile Victorsen	120	2007/2008 season (70%)	0	0	0	0	0
192	GER	Jessica Hujsl	115	2009/2010 season (100%)	0	0	0	0	0
192	GER	Jessica Hujsl	115	2008/2009 season (100%)	0	0	0	0	0
192	GER	Jessica Hujsl	115	2007/2008 season (70%)	0	0	0	115	0
192	CRO	Mirna Libric	115	2009/2010 season (100%)	0	0	0	0	0
192	CRO	Mirna Libric	115	2008/2009 season (100%)	0	0	0	0	0
192	CRO	Mirna Libric	115	2007/2008 season (70%)	0	0	0	115	0
194	PHI	Lauren Ko	113	2009/2010 season (100%)	113	0	0	0	0
194	PHI	Lauren Ko	113	2008/2009 season (100%)	0	0	0	0	0
194	PHI	Lauren Ko	113	2007/2008 season (70%)	0	0	0	0	0
195	SLO	Patricia Glešcic	108	2009/2010 season (100%)	0	108	0	0	0
195	SLO	Patricia Glešcic	108	2008/2009 season (100%)	0	0	0	0	0
195	SLO	Patricia Glešcic	108	2007/2008 season (70%)	0	0	0	0	0
195	AUT	Victoria Huebler	108	2009/2010 season (100%)	0	108	0	0	0
195	AUT	Victoria Huebler	108	2008/2009 season (100%)	0	0	0	0	0
195	AUT	Victoria Huebler	108	2007/2008 season (70%)	0	0	0	0	0
195	RUS	Dinara Vasfieva	108	2009/2010 season (100%)	0	0	0	0	0
195	RUS	Dinara Vasfieva	108	2008/2009 season (100%)	0	108	0	0	0
195	RUS	Dinara Vasfieva	108	2007/2008 season (70%)	0	0	0	0	0
198	CAN	McKenzie Crawford	97	2009/2010 season (100%)	0	0	0	0	0
198	CAN	McKenzie Crawford	97	2008/2009 season (100%)	0	97	0	0	0
198	CAN	McKenzie Crawford	97	2007/2008 season (70%)	0	0	0	0	0
199	USA	Carolyn Ann Alba	93	2009/2010 season (100%)	0	0	0	0	0
199	USA	Carolyn Ann Alba	93	2008/2009 season (100%)	0	0	0	0	0
199	USA	Carolyn Ann Alba	93	2007/2008 season (70%)	0	93	0	0	0
200	AUS	Phoebe Di Tommaso	92	2009/2010 season (100%)	92	0	0	0	0
200	AUS	Phoebe Di Tommaso	92	2008/2009 season (100%)	0	0	0	0	0
200	AUS	Phoebe Di Tommaso	92	2007/2008 season (70%)	0	0	0	0	0
201	UKR	Alina Milevskaia	87	2009/2010 season (100%)	87	0	0	0	0
201	UKR	Alina Milevskaia	87	2008/2009 season (100%)	0	0	0	0	0
201	UKR	Alina Milevskaia	87	2007/2008 season (70%)	0	0	0	0	0
202	CAN	Rika Inoda	84	2009/2010 season (100%)	0	0	0	0	0
202	CAN	Rika Inoda	84	2008/2009 season (100%)	0	0	0	0	0
202	CAN	Rika Inoda	84	2007/2008 season (70%)	0	84	0	0	0
203	BEL	Ira Vannut	78	2009/2010 season (100%)	78	0	0	0	0
203	BEL	Ira Vannut	78	2008/2009 season (100%)	0	0	0	0	0
203	BEL	Ira Vannut	78	2007/2008 season (70%)	0	0	0	0	0
204	PHI	Mericien Venzon	74	2009/2010 season (100%)	74	0	0	0	0
204	PHI	Mericien Venzon	74	2008/2009 season (100%)	0	0	0	0	0
204	PHI	Mericien Venzon	74	2007/2008 season (70%)	0	0	0	0	0
205	HUN	Katherine Hadford	71	2009/2010 season (100%)	0	0	0	0	0
205	HUN	Katherine Hadford	71	2008/2009 season (100%)	0	0	0	0	0
205	HUN	Katherine Hadford	71	2007/2008 season (70%)	71	0	0	0	0
206	NOR	Erle Harstad	68	2009/2010 season (100%)	0	0	0	0	0
206	NOR	Erle Harstad	68	2008/2009 season (100%)	0	0	0	0	0
206	NOR	Erle Harstad	68	2007/2008 season (70%)	0	68	0	0	0
206	GER	Isabel Heintges	68	2009/2010 season (100%)	0	0	0	0	0
206	GER	Isabel Heintges	68	2008/2009 season (100%)	0	0	0	0	0
206	GER	Isabel Heintges	68	2007/2008 season (70%)	0	68	0	0	0
206	FIN	Stina Kerã„Nen	68	2009/2010 season (100%)	0	0	0	0	0
206	FIN	Stina Kerã„Nen	68	2008/2009 season (100%)	0	0	0	0	0
206	FIN	Stina Kerã„Nen	68	2007/2008 season (70%)	0	68	0	0	0
206	JPN	Yurina Nobuhara	68	2009/2010 season (100%)	0	0	0	0	0
206	JPN	Yurina Nobuhara	68	2008/2009 season (100%)	0	0	0	0	0
206	JPN	Yurina Nobuhara	68	2007/2008 season (70%)	0	68	0	0	0
210	SUI	Viviane Kã„Ser	58	2009/2010 season (100%)	0	0	0	0	0
210	SUI	Viviane Kã„Ser	58	2008/2009 season (100%)	0	0	0	0	0
210	SUI	Viviane Kã„Ser	58	2007/2008 season (70%)	58	0	0	0	0
211	MEX	Corenne Bruhns	52	2009/2010 season (100%)	0	0	0	0	0
211	MEX	Corenne Bruhns	52	2008/2009 season (100%)	0	0	0	0	0
211	MEX	Corenne Bruhns	52	2007/2008 season (70%)	52	0	0	0	0

==== Pairs (93 couples) ====
As of 6 April 2010

Rank	Nation	Couple	Points	Season	ISU Championships or Olympics	(Junior) Grand Prix and Final		Selected International Competition	
Rank	Nation	Couple	Points	Season	Best	Best	2nd Best	Best	2nd Best
1	GER	Aliona Savchenko / Robin Szolkowy	5211	2009/2010 season (100%)	1080	648	400	250	0
1	GER	Aliona Savchenko / Robin Szolkowy	5211	2008/2009 season (100%)	1200	648	400	250	0
1	GER	Aliona Savchenko / Robin Szolkowy	5211	2007/2008 season (70%)	840	560	280	175	0
2	CHN	Qing Pang / Jian Tong	4449	2009/2010 season (100%)	1200	720	400	0	0
2	CHN	Qing Pang / Jian Tong	4449	2008/2009 season (100%)	875	800	400	0	0
2	CHN	Qing Pang / Jian Tong	4449	2007/2008 season (70%)	588	454	280	0	0
3	CHN	Dan Zhang / Hao Zhang	4016	2009/2010 season (100%)	840	472	360	0	0
3	CHN	Dan Zhang / Hao Zhang	4016	2008/2009 season (100%)	1080	720	400	0	0
3	CHN	Dan Zhang / Hao Zhang	4016	2007/2008 season (70%)	756	504	280	0	0
4	RUS	Yuko Kavaguti / Alexander Smirnov	4012	2009/2010 season (100%)	972	525	360	0	0
4	RUS	Yuko Kavaguti / Alexander Smirnov	4012	2008/2009 season (100%)	972	525	400	250	0
4	RUS	Yuko Kavaguti / Alexander Smirnov	4012	2007/2008 season (70%)	613	368	227	0	0
5	RUS	Maria Mukhortova / Maxim Trankov	3702	2009/2010 season (100%)	875	583	400	0	0
5	RUS	Maria Mukhortova / Maxim Trankov	3702	2008/2009 season (100%)	787	472	360	225	0
5	RUS	Maria Mukhortova / Maxim Trankov	3702	2007/2008 season (70%)	529	227	204	0	0
6	UKR	Tatiana Volosozhar / Stanislav Morozov	3376	2009/2010 season (100%)	612	360	324	225	0
6	UKR	Tatiana Volosozhar / Stanislav Morozov	3376	2008/2009 season (100%)	709	583	360	203	0
6	UKR	Tatiana Volosozhar / Stanislav Morozov	3376	2007/2008 season (70%)	428	204	183	0	0
7	CAN	Jessica Dube / Bryce Davison	2917	2009/2010 season (100%)	709	360	324	0	0
7	CAN	Jessica Dube / Bryce Davison	2917	2008/2009 season (100%)	756	360	324	0	0
7	CAN	Jessica Dube / Bryce Davison	2917	2007/2008 season (70%)	680	408	280	0	0
8	USA	Keauna McLaughlin / Rockne Brubaker	2607	2009/2010 season (100%)	756	324	292	0	0
8	USA	Keauna McLaughlin / Rockne Brubaker	2607	2008/2009 season (100%)	551	360	324	0	0
8	USA	Keauna McLaughlin / Rockne Brubaker	2607	2007/2008 season (70%)	0	252	252	0	0
9	CAN	Meagan Duhamel / Craig Buntin	2523	2009/2010 season (100%)	680	292	0	0	0
9	CAN	Meagan Duhamel / Craig Buntin	2523	2008/2009 season (100%)	612	324	292	0	0
9	CAN	Meagan Duhamel / Craig Buntin	2523	2007/2008 season (70%)	496	165	0	158	0
10	CHN	Xue Shen / Hongbo Zhao	2400	2009/2010 season (100%)	1200	800	400	0	0
10	CHN	Xue Shen / Hongbo Zhao	2400	2008/2009 season (100%)	0	0	0	0	0
10	CHN	Xue Shen / Hongbo Zhao	2400	2007/2008 season (70%)	0	0	0	0	0
11	CHN	Yue Zhang / Lei Wang	2351	2009/2010 season (100%)	496	486	225	0	0
11	CHN	Yue Zhang / Lei Wang	2351	2008/2009 season (100%)	342	540	262	0	0
11	CHN	Yue Zhang / Lei Wang	2351	2007/2008 season (70%)	266	223	204	0	0
12	JPN	Narumi Takahashi / Mervin Tran	2336	2009/2010 season (100%)	644	540	250	0	0
12	JPN	Narumi Takahashi / Mervin Tran	2336	2008/2009 season (100%)	380	319	203	0	0
12	JPN	Narumi Takahashi / Mervin Tran	2336	2007/2008 season (70%)	115	104	0	0	0
13	RUS	Lubov Iliushechkina / Nodari Maisuradze	2320	2009/2010 season (100%)	0	262	0	0	0
13	RUS	Lubov Iliushechkina / Nodari Maisuradze	2320	2008/2009 season (100%)	715	600	292	0	0
13	RUS	Lubov Iliushechkina / Nodari Maisuradze	2320	2007/2008 season (70%)	451	0	0	0	0
14	USA	Rena Inoue / John Baldwin	2112	2009/2010 season (100%)	0	324	292	0	0
14	USA	Rena Inoue / John Baldwin	2112	2008/2009 season (100%)	446	360	262	0	0
14	USA	Rena Inoue / John Baldwin	2112	2007/2008 season (70%)	428	0	0	0	0
15	FRA	Adeline Canac / Maximin Coia	2016	2009/2010 season (100%)	325	262	0	250	0
15	FRA	Adeline Canac / Maximin Coia	2016	2008/2009 season (100%)	362	236	213	203	0
15	FRA	Adeline Canac / Maximin Coia	2016	2007/2008 season (70%)	214	165	149	0	0
16	CAN	Mylene Brodeur / John Mattatall	1937	2009/2010 season (100%)	446	262	236	0	0
16	CAN	Mylene Brodeur / John Mattatall	1937	2008/2009 season (100%)	465	292	236	0	0
16	CAN	Mylene Brodeur / John Mattatall	1937	2007/2008 season (70%)	312	0	0	0	0
17	RUS	Ksenia Krasilnikova / Konstantin Bezmaternikh	1893	2009/2010 season (100%)	0	236	0	0	0
17	RUS	Ksenia Krasilnikova / Konstantin Bezmaternikh	1893	2008/2009 season (100%)	0	486	250	0	0
17	RUS	Ksenia Krasilnikova / Konstantin Bezmaternikh	1893	2007/2008 season (70%)	501	420	183	0	0
18	USA	Caydee Denney / Jeremy Barrett	1891	2009/2010 season (100%)	638	292	262	0	0
18	USA	Caydee Denney / Jeremy Barrett	1891	2008/2009 season (100%)	517	0	0	182	0
18	USA	Caydee Denney / Jeremy Barrett	1891	2007/2008 season (70%)	0	0	0	0	0
19	GBR	Stacey Kemp / David King	1888	2009/2010 season (100%)	293	213	0	164	0
19	GBR	Stacey Kemp / David King	1888	2008/2009 season (100%)	339	292	0	250	0
19	GBR	Stacey Kemp / David King	1888	2007/2008 season (70%)	347	149	134	0	0
20	CAN	Anabelle Langlois / Cody Hay	1801	2009/2010 season (100%)	517	292	0	203	0
20	CAN	Anabelle Langlois / Cody Hay	1801	2008/2009 season (100%)	0	0	0	0	0
20	CAN	Anabelle Langlois / Cody Hay	1801	2007/2008 season (70%)	402	204	183	0	0
21	CHN	Huibo Dong / Yiming Wu	1762	2009/2010 season (100%)	402	236	236	0	0
21	CHN	Huibo Dong / Yiming Wu	1762	2008/2009 season (100%)	362	292	191	0	0
21	CHN	Huibo Dong / Yiming Wu	1762	2007/2008 season (70%)	405	93	0	0	0
22	ITA	Nicole Della Monica / Yannick Kocon	1729	2009/2010 season (100%)	496	262	0	250	0
22	ITA	Nicole Della Monica / Yannick Kocon	1729	2008/2009 season (100%)	496	0	0	225	0
22	ITA	Nicole Della Monica / Yannick Kocon	1729	2007/2008 season (70%)	127	0	0	0	0
23	USA	Marissa Castelli / Simon Shnapir	1721	2009/2010 season (100%)	325	213	0	0	0
23	USA	Marissa Castelli / Simon Shnapir	1721	2008/2009 season (100%)	579	354	182	0	0
23	USA	Marissa Castelli / Simon Shnapir	1721	2007/2008 season (70%)	0	68	0	0	0
24	USA	Amanda Evora / Mark Ladwig	1639	2009/2010 season (100%)	517	262	213	0	0
24	USA	Amanda Evora / Mark Ladwig	1639	2008/2009 season (100%)	0	292	213	0	0
24	USA	Amanda Evora / Mark Ladwig	1639	2007/2008 season (70%)	0	204	0	142	0
25	CHN	Wenjing Sui / Cong Han	1565	2009/2010 season (100%)	715	600	250	0	0
25	CHN	Wenjing Sui / Cong Han	1565	2008/2009 season (100%)	0	0	0	0	0
25	CHN	Wenjing Sui / Cong Han	1565	2007/2008 season (70%)	0	0	0	0	0
26	RUS	Anastasia Martiusheva / Alexei Rogonov	1544	2009/2010 season (100%)	0	213	0	0	0
26	RUS	Anastasia Martiusheva / Alexei Rogonov	1544	2008/2009 season (100%)	644	437	250	0	0
26	RUS	Anastasia Martiusheva / Alexei Rogonov	1544	2007/2008 season (70%)	0	0	0	0	0
27	SUI	Anaïs Morand / Antoine Dorsaz	1469	2009/2010 season (100%)	402	182	148	164	0
27	SUI	Anaïs Morand / Antoine Dorsaz	1469	2008/2009 season (100%)	305	148	120	0	0
27	SUI	Anaïs Morand / Antoine Dorsaz	1469	2007/2008 season (70%)	157	0	0	0	0
28	FRA	Vanessa James / Yannick Bonheur	1418	2009/2010 season (100%)	446	191	191	0	0
28	FRA	Vanessa James / Yannick Bonheur	1418	2008/2009 season (100%)	377	213	0	0	0
28	FRA	Vanessa James / Yannick Bonheur	1418	2007/2008 season (70%)	0	0	0	0	0
29	USA	Caitlin Yankowskas / John Coughlin	1311	2009/2010 season (100%)	612	213	0	250	0
29	USA	Caitlin Yankowskas / John Coughlin	1311	2008/2009 season (100%)	0	236	0	0	0
29	USA	Caitlin Yankowskas / John Coughlin	1311	2007/2008 season (70%)	0	0	0	0	0
30	EST	Maria Sergejeva / Ilja Glebov	1299	2009/2010 season (100%)	237	191	0	0	0
30	EST	Maria Sergejeva / Ilja Glebov	1299	2008/2009 season (100%)	224	262	148	0	0
30	EST	Maria Sergejeva / Ilja Glebov	1299	2007/2008 season (70%)	295	165	149	0	0
31	RUS	Vera Bazarova / Yuri Larionov	1268	2009/2010 season (100%)	574	292	0	0	0
31	RUS	Vera Bazarova / Yuri Larionov	1268	2008/2009 season (100%)	0	0	0	0	0
31	RUS	Vera Bazarova / Yuri Larionov	1268	2007/2008 season (70%)	0	227	175	0	0
32	GER	Maylin Hausch / Daniel Wende	1196	2009/2010 season (100%)	362	0	0	250	182
32	GER	Maylin Hausch / Daniel Wende	1196	2008/2009 season (100%)	402	0	0	0	0
32	GER	Maylin Hausch / Daniel Wende	1196	2007/2008 season (70%)	0	0	0	0	0
33	RUS	Tatiana Novik / Mikhail Kuznetsov	1183	2009/2010 season (100%)	521	437	225	0	0
33	RUS	Tatiana Novik / Mikhail Kuznetsov	1183	2008/2009 season (100%)	0	0	0	0	0
33	RUS	Tatiana Novik / Mikhail Kuznetsov	1183	2007/2008 season (70%)	0	0	0	0	0
34	CAN	Paige Lawrence / Rudi Swiegers	1145	2009/2010 season (100%)	0	213	0	0	0
34	CAN	Paige Lawrence / Rudi Swiegers	1145	2008/2009 season (100%)	521	164	120	0	0
34	CAN	Paige Lawrence / Rudi Swiegers	1145	2007/2008 season (70%)	0	127	0	0	0
35	RUS	Ksenia Stolbova / Fedor Klimov	1123	2009/2010 season (100%)	579	319	225	0	0
35	RUS	Ksenia Stolbova / Fedor Klimov	1123	2008/2009 season (100%)	0	0	0	0	0
35	RUS	Ksenia Stolbova / Fedor Klimov	1123	2007/2008 season (70%)	0	0	0	0	0
36	CAN	Amanda Velenosi / Mark Fernandez	1057	2009/2010 season (100%)	0	0	0	0	0
36	CAN	Amanda Velenosi / Mark Fernandez	1057	2008/2009 season (100%)	0	213	164	0	0
36	CAN	Amanda Velenosi / Mark Fernandez	1057	2007/2008 season (70%)	216	306	158	0	0
37	RUS	Ksenia Ozerova / Alexander Enbert	1051	2009/2010 season (100%)	0	191	148	225	0
37	RUS	Ksenia Ozerova / Alexander Enbert	1051	2008/2009 season (100%)	0	262	225	0	0
37	RUS	Ksenia Ozerova / Alexander Enbert	1051	2007/2008 season (70%)	0	0	0	0	0
38	USA	Britney Simpson / Nathan Miller	1026	2009/2010 season (100%)	469	354	203	0	0
38	USA	Britney Simpson / Nathan Miller	1026	2008/2009 season (100%)	0	0	0	0	0
38	USA	Britney Simpson / Nathan Miller	1026	2007/2008 season (70%)	0	0	0	0	0
39	CAN	Kaleigh Hole / Adam Johnson	921	2009/2010 season (100%)	277	394	250	0	0
39	CAN	Kaleigh Hole / Adam Johnson	921	2008/2009 season (100%)	0	0	0	0	0
39	CAN	Kaleigh Hole / Adam Johnson	921	2007/2008 season (70%)	0	0	0	0	0
40	UKR	Ekaterina Kostenko / Roman Talan	898	2009/2010 season (100%)	162	0	0	203	164
40	UKR	Ekaterina Kostenko / Roman Talan	898	2008/2009 season (100%)	140	0	0	203	0
40	UKR	Ekaterina Kostenko / Roman Talan	898	2007/2008 season (70%)	166	0	0	0	0
41	USA	Brooke Castile / Benjamin Okolski	894	2009/2010 season (100%)	0	236	0	182	0
41	USA	Brooke Castile / Benjamin Okolski	894	2008/2009 season (100%)	0	0	0	0	0
41	USA	Brooke Castile / Benjamin Okolski	894	2007/2008 season (70%)	476	0	0	0	0
42	CAN	Maddison Bird / Raymond Schultz	883	2009/2010 season (100%)	0	164	164	0	0
42	CAN	Maddison Bird / Raymond Schultz	883	2008/2009 season (100%)	422	133	0	0	0
42	CAN	Maddison Bird / Raymond Schultz	883	2007/2008 season (70%)	0	0	0	0	0
43	ITA	Stefania Berton / Ondrej Hotárek	846	2009/2010 season (100%)	418	0	0	225	203
43	ITA	Stefania Berton / Ondrej Hotárek	846	2008/2009 season (100%)	0	0	0	0	0
43	ITA	Stefania Berton / Ondrej Hotárek	846	2007/2008 season (70%)	0	0	0	0	0
44	ITA	Marika Zanforlin / Federico Degli Esposti	811	2009/2010 season (100%)	0	0	0	0	0
44	ITA	Marika Zanforlin / Federico Degli Esposti	811	2008/2009 season (100%)	237	0	0	182	164
44	ITA	Marika Zanforlin / Federico Degli Esposti	811	2007/2008 season (70%)	228	0	0	0	0
45	CAN	Monica Pisotta / Michael Stewart	750	2009/2010 season (100%)	0	0	0	0	0
45	CAN	Monica Pisotta / Michael Stewart	750	2008/2009 season (100%)	0	236	191	0	0
45	CAN	Monica Pisotta / Michael Stewart	750	2007/2008 season (70%)	239	84	0	0	0
46	GBR	Erica Risseeuw / Robert Paxton	710	2009/2010 season (100%)	264	0	0	0	0
46	GBR	Erica Risseeuw / Robert Paxton	710	2008/2009 season (100%)	446	0	0	0	0
46	GBR	Erica Risseeuw / Robert Paxton	710	2007/2008 season (70%)	0	0	0	0	0
47	CAN	Brittany Jones / Kurtis Gaskell	703	2009/2010 season (100%)	380	203	120	0	0
47	CAN	Brittany Jones / Kurtis Gaskell	703	2008/2009 season (100%)	0	0	0	0	0
47	CAN	Brittany Jones / Kurtis Gaskell	703	2007/2008 season (70%)	0	0	0	0	0
48	TPE	Amanda Sunyoto-Yang / Darryll Sulindro-Yang	702	2009/2010 season (100%)	293	0	0	0	0
48	TPE	Amanda Sunyoto-Yang / Darryll Sulindro-Yang	702	2008/2009 season (100%)	325	0	0	0	0
48	TPE	Amanda Sunyoto-Yang / Darryll Sulindro-Yang	702	2007/2008 season (70%)	141	84	0	0	0
49	GER	Mari Vartmann / Florian Just	697	2009/2010 season (100%)	0	0	0	203	182
49	GER	Mari Vartmann / Florian Just	697	2008/2009 season (100%)	0	0	0	0	0
49	GER	Mari Vartmann / Florian Just	697	2007/2008 season (70%)	312	0	0	0	0
50	CHN	Jiaqi Li / Jiankun Xu	695	2009/2010 season (100%)	0	0	0	0	0
50	CHN	Jiaqi Li / Jiankun Xu	695	2008/2009 season (100%)	0	0	0	0	0
50	CHN	Jiaqi Li / Jiankun Xu	695	2007/2008 season (70%)	347	183	165	0	0
51	ISR	Ekaterina Sokolova / Fedor Sokolov	653	2009/2010 season (100%)	0	0	0	0	0
51	ISR	Ekaterina Sokolova / Fedor Sokolov	653	2008/2009 season (100%)	113	191	0	164	0
51	ISR	Ekaterina Sokolova / Fedor Sokolov	653	2007/2008 season (70%)	185	0	0	0	0
52	CHN	Duo Cheng / Yu Gao	650	2009/2010 season (100%)	0	133	120	0	0
52	CHN	Duo Cheng / Yu Gao	650	2008/2009 season (100%)	249	148	0	0	0
52	CHN	Duo Cheng / Yu Gao	650	2007/2008 season (70%)	0	0	0	0	0
53	SVK	Gabriela Cermanová / Martin Hanulák	637	2009/2010 season (100%)	126	0	0	182	0
53	SVK	Gabriela Cermanová / Martin Hanulák	637	2008/2009 season (100%)	147	0	0	182	0
53	SVK	Gabriela Cermanová / Martin Hanulák	637	2007/2008 season (70%)	92	0	0	0	0
54	CAN	Kirsten Moore-Towers / Dylan Moscovitch	598	2009/2010 season (100%)	362	236	0	0	0
54	CAN	Kirsten Moore-Towers / Dylan Moscovitch	598	2008/2009 season (100%)	0	0	0	0	0
54	CAN	Kirsten Moore-Towers / Dylan Moscovitch	598	2007/2008 season (70%)	0	0	0	0	0
55	CAN	Margaret Purdy / Michael Marinaro	572	2009/2010 season (100%)	342	133	97	0	0
55	CAN	Margaret Purdy / Michael Marinaro	572	2008/2009 season (100%)	0	0	0	0	0
55	CAN	Margaret Purdy / Michael Marinaro	572	2007/2008 season (70%)	0	0	0	0	0
56	GRE	Jessica Crenshaw / Chad Tsagris	557	2009/2010 season (100%)	192	0	0	203	0
56	GRE	Jessica Crenshaw / Chad Tsagris	557	2008/2009 season (100%)	162	0	0	0	0
56	GRE	Jessica Crenshaw / Chad Tsagris	557	2007/2008 season (70%)	0	0	0	0	0
57	USA	Chelsi Guillen / Danny Curzon	551	2009/2010 season (100%)	0	0	0	0	0
57	USA	Chelsi Guillen / Danny Curzon	551	2008/2009 season (100%)	0	213	0	0	0
57	USA	Chelsi Guillen / Danny Curzon	551	2007/2008 season (70%)	194	76	68	0	0
57	POL	Dominika Piatkowska / Dmitri Khromin	551	2009/2010 season (100%)	0	0	0	0	0
57	POL	Dominika Piatkowska / Dmitri Khromin	551	2008/2009 season (100%)	0	0	0	0	0
57	POL	Dominika Piatkowska / Dmitri Khromin	551	2007/2008 season (70%)	253	149	149	0	0
59	UZB	Marina Aganina / Dmitri Zobnin	546	2009/2010 season (100%)	0	0	0	0	0
59	UZB	Marina Aganina / Dmitri Zobnin	546	2008/2009 season (100%)	293	0	0	0	0
59	UZB	Marina Aganina / Dmitri Zobnin	546	2007/2008 season (70%)	253	0	0	0	0
60	POL	Krystyna Klimczak / Janusz Karweta	506	2009/2010 season (100%)	0	0	0	0	0
60	POL	Krystyna Klimczak / Janusz Karweta	506	2008/2009 season (100%)	202	0	0	0	0
60	POL	Krystyna Klimczak / Janusz Karweta	506	2007/2008 season (70%)	103	201	0	0	0
61	FRA	Melodie Chataigner / Medhi Bouzzine	472	2009/2010 season (100%)	0	0	0	0	0
61	FRA	Melodie Chataigner / Medhi Bouzzine	472	2008/2009 season (100%)	0	191	0	0	0
61	FRA	Melodie Chataigner / Medhi Bouzzine	472	2007/2008 season (70%)	281	0	0	0	0
62	RUS	Alexandra Vasilieva / Yuri Shevchuk	469	2009/2010 season (100%)	0	287	182	0	0
62	RUS	Alexandra Vasilieva / Yuri Shevchuk	469	2008/2009 season (100%)	0	0	0	0	0
62	RUS	Alexandra Vasilieva / Yuri Shevchuk	469	2007/2008 season (70%)	0	0	0	0	0
63	POL	Joanna Sulej / Mateusz Chruscinski	467	2009/2010 season (100%)	275	0	0	0	0
63	POL	Joanna Sulej / Mateusz Chruscinski	467	2008/2009 season (100%)	192	0	0	0	0
63	POL	Joanna Sulej / Mateusz Chruscinski	467	2007/2008 season (70%)	0	0	0	0	0
64	USA	Felicia Zhang / Taylor Toth	456	2009/2010 season (100%)	308	148	0	0	0
64	USA	Felicia Zhang / Taylor Toth	456	2008/2009 season (100%)	0	0	0	0	0
64	USA	Felicia Zhang / Taylor Toth	456	2007/2008 season (70%)	0	0	0	0	0
65	USA	Chloe Katz / Joseph Lynch	450	2009/2010 season (100%)	0	0	0	225	0
65	USA	Chloe Katz / Joseph Lynch	450	2008/2009 season (100%)	0	0	0	225	0
65	USA	Chloe Katz / Joseph Lynch	450	2007/2008 season (70%)	0	0	0	0	0
66	RUS	Anastaisa Khodkova / Pavel Sliusarenko	418	2009/2010 season (100%)	0	0	0	0	0
66	RUS	Anastaisa Khodkova / Pavel Sliusarenko	418	2008/2009 season (100%)	0	0	0	0	0
66	RUS	Anastaisa Khodkova / Pavel Sliusarenko	418	2007/2008 season (70%)	0	276	142	0	0
67	RUS	Ekaterina Sheremetieva / Egor Chudin	407	2009/2010 season (100%)	0	0	0	225	182
67	RUS	Ekaterina Sheremetieva / Egor Chudin	407	2008/2009 season (100%)	0	0	0	0	0
67	RUS	Ekaterina Sheremetieva / Egor Chudin	407	2007/2008 season (70%)	0	0	0	0	0
68	RUS	Arina Ushakova / Sergei Karev	386	2009/2010 season (100%)	0	0	0	0	0
68	RUS	Arina Ushakova / Sergei Karev	386	2008/2009 season (100%)	0	0	0	0	0
68	RUS	Arina Ushakova / Sergei Karev	386	2007/2008 season (70%)	386	0	0	0	0
69	GER	Juliana Gurdzhi / Alexander Völler	321	2009/2010 season (100%)	224	97	0	0	0
69	GER	Juliana Gurdzhi / Alexander Völler	321	2008/2009 season (100%)	0	0	0	0	0
69	GER	Juliana Gurdzhi / Alexander Völler	321	2007/2008 season (70%)	0	0	0	0	0
70	USA	Brynn Carman / Aj Reiss	299	2009/2010 season (100%)	202	97	0	0	0
70	USA	Brynn Carman / Aj Reiss	299	2008/2009 season (100%)	0	0	0	0	0
70	USA	Brynn Carman / Aj Reiss	299	2007/2008 season (70%)	0	0	0	0	0
71	CZE	Klara Kadlecova / Petr Bidar	290	2009/2010 season (100%)	182	108	0	0	0
71	CZE	Klara Kadlecova / Petr Bidar	290	2008/2009 season (100%)	0	0	0	0	0
71	CZE	Klara Kadlecova / Petr Bidar	290	2007/2008 season (70%)	0	0	0	0	0
72	CAN	Taylor Steele / Robert Schultz	272	2009/2010 season (100%)	0	164	108	0	0
72	CAN	Taylor Steele / Robert Schultz	272	2008/2009 season (100%)	0	0	0	0	0
72	CAN	Taylor Steele / Robert Schultz	272	2007/2008 season (70%)	0	0	0	0	0
73	FRA	Camille Foucher / Bruno Massot	265	2009/2010 season (100%)	0	0	0	0	0
73	FRA	Camille Foucher / Bruno Massot	265	2008/2009 season (100%)	182	0	0	0	0
73	FRA	Camille Foucher / Bruno Massot	265	2007/2008 season (70%)	83	0	0	0	0
74	USA	Molly Aaron / Daniyel Cohen	240	2009/2010 season (100%)	0	0	0	0	0
74	USA	Molly Aaron / Daniyel Cohen	240	2008/2009 season (100%)	0	120	120	0	0
74	USA	Molly Aaron / Daniyel Cohen	240	2007/2008 season (70%)	0	0	0	0	0
75	HKG	Rie Aoi / Wen Xiong Guo	226	2009/2010 season (100%)	119	0	0	0	0
75	HKG	Rie Aoi / Wen Xiong Guo	226	2008/2009 season (100%)	107	0	0	0	0
75	HKG	Rie Aoi / Wen Xiong Guo	226	2007/2008 season (70%)	0	0	0	0	0
76	NED	Marylie Jorg / Benjamin Koenderink	216	2009/2010 season (100%)	0	97	0	0	0
76	NED	Marylie Jorg / Benjamin Koenderink	216	2008/2009 season (100%)	119	0	0	0	0
76	NED	Marylie Jorg / Benjamin Koenderink	216	2007/2008 season (70%)	0	0	0	0	0
77	BLR	Lubov Bakirova / Mikalai Kamianchuk	180	2009/2010 season (100%)	180	0	0	0	0
77	BLR	Lubov Bakirova / Mikalai Kamianchuk	180	2008/2009 season (100%)	0	0	0	0	0
77	BLR	Lubov Bakirova / Mikalai Kamianchuk	180	2007/2008 season (70%)	0	0	0	0	0
78	BUL	Nina Ivanova / Filip Zalevski	173	2009/2010 season (100%)	173	0	0	0	0
78	BUL	Nina Ivanova / Filip Zalevski	173	2008/2009 season (100%)	0	0	0	0	0
78	BUL	Nina Ivanova / Filip Zalevski	173	2007/2008 season (70%)	0	0	0	0	0
79	POL	Elizabeth Harb / Patryk Szalasny	164	2009/2010 season (100%)	0	0	0	164	0
79	POL	Elizabeth Harb / Patryk Szalasny	164	2008/2009 season (100%)	0	0	0	0	0
79	POL	Elizabeth Harb / Patryk Szalasny	164	2007/2008 season (70%)	0	0	0	0	0
79	GER	Nicole Gurny / Martin Liebers	164	2009/2010 season (100%)	0	0	0	164	0
79	GER	Nicole Gurny / Martin Liebers	164	2008/2009 season (100%)	0	0	0	0	0
79	GER	Nicole Gurny / Martin Liebers	164	2007/2008 season (70%)	0	0	0	0	0
81	ISR	Hayley Anne Sacks / Vadim Akolzin	155	2009/2010 season (100%)	0	0	0	0	0
81	ISR	Hayley Anne Sacks / Vadim Akolzin	155	2008/2009 season (100%)	0	0	0	0	0
81	ISR	Hayley Anne Sacks / Vadim Akolzin	155	2007/2008 season (70%)	155	0	0	0	0
82	CRO	Amy Ireland / Michael Bahoric	150	2009/2010 season (100%)	0	0	0	0	0
82	CRO	Amy Ireland / Michael Bahoric	150	2008/2009 season (100%)	0	0	0	0	0
82	CRO	Amy Ireland / Michael Bahoric	150	2007/2008 season (70%)	150	0	0	0	0
83	RUS	Ekaterina Petaikina / Maxim Kurduykov	148	2009/2010 season (100%)	0	148	0	0	0
83	RUS	Ekaterina Petaikina / Maxim Kurduykov	148	2008/2009 season (100%)	0	0	0	0	0
83	RUS	Ekaterina Petaikina / Maxim Kurduykov	148	2007/2008 season (70%)	0	0	0	0	0
84	ISR	Danielle Montalbano / Evgeni Krasnopolski	140	2009/2010 season (100%)	140	0	0	0	0
84	ISR	Danielle Montalbano / Evgeni Krasnopolski	140	2008/2009 season (100%)	0	0	0	0	0
84	ISR	Danielle Montalbano / Evgeni Krasnopolski	140	2007/2008 season (70%)	0	0	0	0	0
85	USA	Meredith Pipkin / Brett Dunie-Neustadt	133	2009/2010 season (100%)	0	133	0	0	0
85	USA	Meredith Pipkin / Brett Dunie-Neustadt	133	2008/2009 season (100%)	0	0	0	0	0
85	USA	Meredith Pipkin / Brett Dunie-Neustadt	133	2007/2008 season (70%)	0	0	0	0	0
86	CZE	Alexandra Herbrikova / Lukas Ovcacek	132	2009/2010 season (100%)	0	0	0	0	0
86	CZE	Alexandra Herbrikova / Lukas Ovcacek	132	2008/2009 season (100%)	132	0	0	0	0
86	CZE	Alexandra Herbrikova / Lukas Ovcacek	132	2007/2008 season (70%)	0	0	0	0	0
87	CAN	Katherine Bobak / Matthew Penasse	120	2009/2010 season (100%)	0	120	0	0	0
87	CAN	Katherine Bobak / Matthew Penasse	120	2008/2009 season (100%)	0	0	0	0	0
87	CAN	Katherine Bobak / Matthew Penasse	120	2007/2008 season (70%)	0	0	0	0	0
87	USA	Tori Vollmer / Zack Sidhu	120	2009/2010 season (100%)	0	120	0	0	0
87	USA	Tori Vollmer / Zack Sidhu	120	2008/2009 season (100%)	0	0	0	0	0
87	USA	Tori Vollmer / Zack Sidhu	120	2007/2008 season (70%)	0	0	0	0	0
89	HUN	Victoria Hecht / Christopher Trefil	113	2009/2010 season (100%)	113	0	0	0	0
89	HUN	Victoria Hecht / Christopher Trefil	113	2008/2009 season (100%)	0	0	0	0	0
89	HUN	Victoria Hecht / Christopher Trefil	113	2007/2008 season (70%)	0	0	0	0	0
90	CAN	Kristen Tikel / Ian Beharry	108	2009/2010 season (100%)	0	108	0	0	0
90	CAN	Kristen Tikel / Ian Beharry	108	2008/2009 season (100%)	0	0	0	0	0
90	CAN	Kristen Tikel / Ian Beharry	108	2007/2008 season (70%)	0	0	0	0	0
90	USA	Kylie Duarte / Colin Grafton	108	2009/2010 season (100%)	0	108	0	0	0
90	USA	Kylie Duarte / Colin Grafton	108	2008/2009 season (100%)	0	0	0	0	0
90	USA	Kylie Duarte / Colin Grafton	108	2007/2008 season (70%)	0	0	0	0	0
92	UKR	Anna Khnychenkova / Sergei Kulbach	97	2009/2010 season (100%)	0	0	0	0	0
92	UKR	Anna Khnychenkova / Sergei Kulbach	97	2008/2009 season (100%)	97	0	0	0	0
92	UKR	Anna Khnychenkova / Sergei Kulbach	97	2007/2008 season (70%)	0	0	0	0	0
92	PRK	Ji Hyang Ri / Won Hyok Thae	97	2009/2010 season (100%)	0	0	0	0	0
92	PRK	Ji Hyang Ri / Won Hyok Thae	97	2008/2009 season (100%)	0	97	0	0	0
92	PRK	Ji Hyang Ri / Won Hyok Thae	97	2007/2008 season (70%)	0	0	0	0	0

==== Ice dance (132 couples) ====
As of 26 March 2010

Rank	Nation	Couple	Points	Season	ISU Championships or Olympics	(Junior) Grand Prix and Final		Selected International Competition	
Rank	Nation	Couple	Points	Season	Best	Best	2nd Best	Best	2nd Best
1	USA	Meryl Davis / Charlie White	4453	2009/2010 season (100%)	1080	800	400	250	0
1	USA	Meryl Davis / Charlie White	4453	2008/2009 season (100%)	875	648	400	0	0
1	USA	Meryl Davis / Charlie White	4453	2007/2008 season (70%)	529	227	204	0	0
2	RUS	Oksana Domnina / Maxim Shabalin	4132	2009/2010 season (100%)	972	0	0	0	0
2	RUS	Oksana Domnina / Maxim Shabalin	4132	2008/2009 season (100%)	1200	720	400	0	0
2	RUS	Oksana Domnina / Maxim Shabalin	4132	2007/2008 season (70%)	588	560	280	0	0
3	CAN	Tessa Virtue / Scott Moir	3980	2009/2010 season (100%)	1200	720	400	0	0
3	CAN	Tessa Virtue / Scott Moir	3980	2008/2009 season (100%)	972	0	0	0	0
3	CAN	Tessa Virtue / Scott Moir	3980	2007/2008 season (70%)	756	408	280	0	0
4	FRA	Isabelle Delobel / Olivier Schoenfelder	3658	2009/2010 season (100%)	709	0	0	0	0
4	FRA	Isabelle Delobel / Olivier Schoenfelder	3658	2008/2009 season (100%)	0	800	400	0	0
4	FRA	Isabelle Delobel / Olivier Schoenfelder	3658	2007/2008 season (70%)	840	454	280	175	0
5	USA	Tanith Belbin / Benjamin Agosto	3619	2009/2010 season (100%)	875	400	400	0	0
5	USA	Tanith Belbin / Benjamin Agosto	3619	2008/2009 season (100%)	1080	360	360	0	0
5	USA	Tanith Belbin / Benjamin Agosto	3619	2007/2008 season (70%)	613	504	280	0	0
6	GBR	Sinead Kerr / John Kerr	3558	2009/2010 season (100%)	787	583	360	250	0
6	GBR	Sinead Kerr / John Kerr	3558	2008/2009 season (100%)	680	324	324	250	0
6	GBR	Sinead Kerr / John Kerr	3558	2007/2008 season (70%)	402	204	183	0	0
7	FRA	Nathalie Péchalat / Fabian Bourzat	3360	2009/2010 season (100%)	875	648	360	0	0
7	FRA	Nathalie Péchalat / Fabian Bourzat	3360	2008/2009 season (100%)	787	360	324	0	0
7	FRA	Nathalie Péchalat / Fabian Bourzat	3360	2007/2008 season (70%)	447	330	252	0	0
8	ITA	Federica Faiella / Massimo Scali	3262	2009/2010 season (100%)	972	324	0	0	0
8	ITA	Federica Faiella / Massimo Scali	3262	2008/2009 season (100%)	756	583	400	0	0
8	ITA	Federica Faiella / Massimo Scali	3262	2007/2008 season (70%)	551	227	227	0	0
9	RUS	Jana Khokhlova / Sergei Novitski	2972	2009/2010 season (100%)	680	360	292	0	0
9	RUS	Jana Khokhlova / Sergei Novitski	2972	2008/2009 season (100%)	840	400	324	0	0
9	RUS	Jana Khokhlova / Sergei Novitski	2972	2007/2008 season (70%)	680	368	252	0	0
10	ISR	Alexandra Zaretsky / Roman Zaretsky	2832	2009/2010 season (100%)	709	324	262	250	225
10	ISR	Alexandra Zaretsky / Roman Zaretsky	2832	2008/2009 season (100%)	339	262	213	225	0
10	ISR	Alexandra Zaretsky / Roman Zaretsky	2832	2007/2008 season (70%)	362	204	149	0	0
11	USA	Emily Samuelson / Evan Bates	2733	2009/2010 season (100%)	517	292	262	0	0
11	USA	Emily Samuelson / Evan Bates	2733	2008/2009 season (100%)	680	324	292	250	0
11	USA	Emily Samuelson / Evan Bates	2733	2007/2008 season (70%)	501	378	175	0	0
12	CAN	Vanessa Crone / Paul Poirier	2712	2009/2010 season (100%)	638	472	324	0	0
12	CAN	Vanessa Crone / Paul Poirier	2712	2008/2009 season (100%)	612	360	292	0	0
12	CAN	Vanessa Crone / Paul Poirier	2712	2007/2008 season (70%)	451	306	175	0	0
13	USA	Madison Chock / Greg Zuerlein	2628	2009/2010 season (100%)	551	236	191	0	0
13	USA	Madison Chock / Greg Zuerlein	2628	2008/2009 season (100%)	715	600	250	0	0
13	USA	Madison Chock / Greg Zuerlein	2628	2007/2008 season (70%)	0	276	175	0	0
14	USA	Maia Shibutani / Alex Shibutani	2588	2009/2010 season (100%)	521	486	250	0	0
14	USA	Maia Shibutani / Alex Shibutani	2588	2008/2009 season (100%)	644	437	250	0	0
14	USA	Maia Shibutani / Alex Shibutani	2588	2007/2008 season (70%)	0	0	0	0	0
15	ITA	Anna Cappellini / Luca Lanotte	2516	2009/2010 season (100%)	496	525	360	0	0
15	ITA	Anna Cappellini / Luca Lanotte	2516	2008/2009 season (100%)	551	292	292	0	0
15	ITA	Anna Cappellini / Luca Lanotte	2516	2007/2008 season (70%)	326	252	204	0	0
16	USA	Madison Hubbell / Keiffer Hubbell	2418	2009/2010 season (100%)	680	236	191	0	0
16	USA	Madison Hubbell / Keiffer Hubbell	2418	2008/2009 season (100%)	521	540	250	0	0
16	USA	Madison Hubbell / Keiffer Hubbell	2418	2007/2008 season (70%)	328	0	0	0	0
17	CAN	Kaitlyn Weaver / Andrew Poje	2400	2009/2010 season (100%)	840	324	236	0	0
17	CAN	Kaitlyn Weaver / Andrew Poje	2400	2008/2009 season (100%)	551	236	213	0	0
17	CAN	Kaitlyn Weaver / Andrew Poje	2400	2007/2008 season (70%)	386	165	149	0	0
18	CAN	Kharis Ralph / Asher Hill	2206	2009/2010 season (100%)	496	437	225	0	0
18	CAN	Kharis Ralph / Asher Hill	2206	2008/2009 season (100%)	469	354	225	0	0
18	CAN	Kharis Ralph / Asher Hill	2206	2007/2008 season (70%)	239	127	93	0	0
19	RUS	Kristina Gorshkova / Vitali Butikov	2165	2009/2010 season (100%)	0	213	213	225	0
19	RUS	Kristina Gorshkova / Vitali Butikov	2165	2008/2009 season (100%)	0	292	262	225	203
19	RUS	Kristina Gorshkova / Vitali Butikov	2165	2007/2008 season (70%)	405	340	175	0	0
20	USA	Kimberly Navarro / Brent Bommentre	1968	2009/2010 season (100%)	305	262	236	0	0
20	USA	Kimberly Navarro / Brent Bommentre	1968	2008/2009 season (100%)	496	262	236	0	0
20	USA	Kimberly Navarro / Brent Bommentre	1968	2007/2008 season (70%)	476	165	165	0	0
21	RUS	Ekaterina Bobrova / Dmitri Soloviev	1923	2009/2010 season (100%)	574	292	292	0	0
21	RUS	Ekaterina Bobrova / Dmitri Soloviev	1923	2008/2009 season (100%)	0	292	236	0	0
21	RUS	Ekaterina Bobrova / Dmitri Soloviev	1923	2007/2008 season (70%)	237	204	183	0	0
22	UKR	Anna Zadorozhniuk / Sergei Verbillo	1865	2009/2010 season (100%)	402	292	236	0	0
22	UKR	Anna Zadorozhniuk / Sergei Verbillo	1865	2008/2009 season (100%)	446	262	191	0	0
22	UKR	Anna Zadorozhniuk / Sergei Verbillo	1865	2007/2008 season (70%)	205	227	165	0	0
23	CHN	Xintong Huang / Xun Zheng	1846	2009/2010 season (100%)	612	262	213	164	0
23	CHN	Xintong Huang / Xun Zheng	1846	2008/2009 season (100%)	446	0	0	0	0
23	CHN	Xintong Huang / Xun Zheng	1846	2007/2008 season (70%)	253	149	0	0	0
24	RUS	Ksenia Monko / Kirill Khaliavin	1796	2009/2010 season (100%)	579	600	250	0	0
24	RUS	Ksenia Monko / Kirill Khaliavin	1796	2008/2009 season (100%)	0	203	164	0	0
24	RUS	Ksenia Monko / Kirill Khaliavin	1796	2007/2008 season (70%)	0	142	142	0	0
25	RUS	Ekaterina Rubleva / Ivan Shefer	1776	2009/2010 season (100%)	339	324	262	0	0
25	RUS	Ekaterina Rubleva / Ivan Shefer	1776	2008/2009 season (100%)	402	236	213	0	0
25	RUS	Ekaterina Rubleva / Ivan Shefer	1776	2007/2008 season (70%)	193	149	134	0	0
26	CZE	Lucie Myslivecková / Matej Novák	1712	2009/2010 season (100%)	247	213	0	225	0
26	CZE	Lucie Myslivecková / Matej Novák	1712	2008/2009 season (100%)	342	203	182	0	0
26	CZE	Lucie Myslivecková / Matej Novák	1712	2007/2008 season (70%)	157	158	127	142	0
27	LTU	Katherine Copely / Deividas Stagniūnas	1685	2009/2010 season (100%)	0	191	0	203	0
27	LTU	Katherine Copely / Deividas Stagniūnas	1685	2008/2009 season (100%)	325	236	191	0	0
27	LTU	Katherine Copely / Deividas Stagniūnas	1685	2007/2008 season (70%)	214	183	0	142	0
28	ITA	Lorenza Alessandrini / Simone Vaturi	1657	2009/2010 season (100%)	469	319	225	0	0
28	ITA	Lorenza Alessandrini / Simone Vaturi	1657	2008/2009 season (100%)	308	203	133	0	0
28	ITA	Lorenza Alessandrini / Simone Vaturi	1657	2007/2008 season (70%)	0	104	104	0	0
29	CAN	Allie Hann-McCurdy / Michael Coreno	1625	2009/2010 season (100%)	756	191	0	0	0
29	CAN	Allie Hann-McCurdy / Michael Coreno	1625	2008/2009 season (100%)	0	0	0	0	0
29	CAN	Allie Hann-McCurdy / Michael Coreno	1625	2007/2008 season (70%)	347	204	0	127	0
30	GER	Carolina Hermann / Daniel Hermann	1599	2009/2010 season (100%)	131	213	0	225	182
30	GER	Carolina Hermann / Daniel Hermann	1599	2008/2009 season (100%)	264	0	0	225	225
30	GER	Carolina Hermann / Daniel Hermann	1599	2007/2008 season (70%)	0	134	0	158	115
31	RUS	Elena Ilinykh / Nikita Katsalapov	1505	2009/2010 season (100%)	715	540	250	0	0
31	RUS	Elena Ilinykh / Nikita Katsalapov	1505	2008/2009 season (100%)	0	0	0	0	0
31	RUS	Elena Ilinykh / Nikita Katsalapov	1505	2007/2008 season (70%)	0	0	0	0	0
32	UKR	Alisa Agafonova / Dmitri Dun	1488	2009/2010 season (100%)	0	203	182	0	0
32	UKR	Alisa Agafonova / Dmitri Dun	1488	2008/2009 season (100%)	202	319	250	0	0
32	UKR	Alisa Agafonova / Dmitri Dun	1488	2007/2008 season (70%)	266	248	158	0	0
33	CAN	Karen Routhier / Eric Saucke-Lacelle	1369	2009/2010 season (100%)	0	225	164	0	0
33	CAN	Karen Routhier / Eric Saucke-Lacelle	1369	2008/2009 season (100%)	380	203	203	0	0
33	CAN	Karen Routhier / Eric Saucke-Lacelle	1369	2007/2008 season (70%)	194	115	84	0	0
34	UKR	Alla Beknazarova / Vladimir Zuev	1300	2009/2010 season (100%)	293	0	0	203	0
34	UKR	Alla Beknazarova / Vladimir Zuev	1300	2008/2009 season (100%)	237	0	0	250	0
34	UKR	Alla Beknazarova / Vladimir Zuev	1300	2007/2008 season (70%)	150	0	0	175	142
35	JPN	Cathy Reed / Chris Reed	1289	2009/2010 season (100%)	275	213	0	164	0
35	JPN	Cathy Reed / Chris Reed	1289	2008/2009 season (100%)	247	191	0	0	0
35	JPN	Cathy Reed / Chris Reed	1289	2007/2008 season (70%)	312	134	0	0	0
36	RUS	Marina Antipova / Artem Kudashev	1273	2009/2010 season (100%)	0	287	225	0	0
36	RUS	Marina Antipova / Artem Kudashev	1273	2008/2009 season (100%)	249	287	225	0	0
36	RUS	Marina Antipova / Artem Kudashev	1273	2007/2008 season (70%)	0	93	0	0	0
37	AZE	Kristin Fraser / Igor Lukanin	1257	2009/2010 season (100%)	0	0	0	0	0
37	AZE	Kristin Fraser / Igor Lukanin	1257	2008/2009 season (100%)	362	236	0	0	0
37	AZE	Kristin Fraser / Igor Lukanin	1257	2007/2008 season (70%)	293	183	183	0	0
38	GER	Nelli Zhiganshina / Alexander Gazsi	1214	2009/2010 season (100%)	0	0	0	203	0
38	GER	Nelli Zhiganshina / Alexander Gazsi	1214	2008/2009 season (100%)	0	0	0	250	250
38	GER	Nelli Zhiganshina / Alexander Gazsi	1214	2007/2008 season (70%)	113	149	134	115	0
39	RUS	Anastasia Platonova / Alexander Grachev	1175	2009/2010 season (100%)	0	262	0	225	0
39	RUS	Anastasia Platonova / Alexander Grachev	1175	2008/2009 season (100%)	0	213	0	250	225
39	RUS	Anastasia Platonova / Alexander Grachev	1175	2007/2008 season (70%)	0	0	0	0	0
40	USA	Piper Gilles / Zachary Donohue	1168	2009/2010 season (100%)	308	203	182	0	0
40	USA	Piper Gilles / Zachary Donohue	1168	2008/2009 season (100%)	0	250	225	0	0
40	USA	Piper Gilles / Zachary Donohue	1168	2007/2008 season (70%)	0	0	0	0	0
41	CZE	Kamila Hajkova / David Vincour	1094	2009/2010 season (100%)	146	0	0	203	182
41	CZE	Kamila Hajkova / David Vincour	1094	2008/2009 season (100%)	156	0	0	225	182
41	CZE	Kamila Hajkova / David Vincour	1094	2007/2008 season (70%)	109	0	0	175	0
42	RUS	Ekaterina Pushkash / Jonathan Guerreiro	1066	2009/2010 season (100%)	422	394	250	0	0
42	RUS	Ekaterina Pushkash / Jonathan Guerreiro	1066	2008/2009 season (100%)	0	0	0	0	0
42	RUS	Ekaterina Pushkash / Jonathan Guerreiro	1066	2007/2008 season (70%)	0	0	0	0	0
43	USA	Rachel Tibbetts / Collin Brubaker	1050	2009/2010 season (100%)	380	225	133	0	0
43	USA	Rachel Tibbetts / Collin Brubaker	1050	2008/2009 season (100%)	0	164	148	0	0
43	USA	Rachel Tibbetts / Collin Brubaker	1050	2007/2008 season (70%)	0	115	115	0	0
44	GER	Christina Beier / William Beier	1047	2009/2010 season (100%)	200	0	0	225	203
44	GER	Christina Beier / William Beier	1047	2008/2009 season (100%)	0	0	0	0	0
44	GER	Christina Beier / William Beier	1047	2007/2008 season (70%)	134	0	0	158	127
45	USA	Jane Summersett / Todd Gilles	1026	2009/2010 season (100%)	446	0	0	164	0
45	USA	Jane Summersett / Todd Gilles	1026	2008/2009 season (100%)	0	213	0	203	0
45	USA	Jane Summersett / Todd Gilles	1026	2007/2008 season (70%)	0	0	0	0	0
46	USA	Jennifer Wester / Daniil Barantsev	1007	2009/2010 season (100%)	0	0	0	0	0
46	USA	Jennifer Wester / Daniil Barantsev	1007	2008/2009 season (100%)	0	213	191	0	0
46	USA	Jennifer Wester / Daniil Barantsev	1007	2007/2008 season (70%)	428	0	0	175	0
47	CHN	Xiaoyang Yu / Chen Wang	995	2009/2010 season (100%)	402	0	0	0	0
47	CHN	Xiaoyang Yu / Chen Wang	995	2008/2009 season (100%)	402	191	0	0	0
47	CHN	Xiaoyang Yu / Chen Wang	995	2007/2008 season (70%)	281	0	0	0	0
48	CAN	Alexandra Paul / Mitchell Islam	990	2009/2010 season (100%)	644	182	164	0	0
48	CAN	Alexandra Paul / Mitchell Islam	990	2008/2009 season (100%)	0	0	0	0	0
48	CAN	Alexandra Paul / Mitchell Islam	990	2007/2008 season (70%)	0	0	0	0	0
49	HUN	Nóra Hoffmann / Maxim Zavozin	965	2009/2010 season (100%)	465	0	0	250	250
49	HUN	Nóra Hoffmann / Maxim Zavozin	965	2008/2009 season (100%)	0	0	0	0	0
49	HUN	Nóra Hoffmann / Maxim Zavozin	965	2007/2008 season (70%)	0	0	0	0	0
50	ITA	Isabella Pajardi / Stefano Caruso	951	2009/2010 season (100%)	0	0	0	0	0
50	ITA	Isabella Pajardi / Stefano Caruso	951	2008/2009 season (100%)	173	0	0	164	0
50	ITA	Isabella Pajardi / Stefano Caruso	951	2007/2008 season (70%)	216	223	175	0	0
51	USA	Isabella Cannuscio / Ian Lorello	903	2009/2010 season (100%)	0	354	203	0	0
51	USA	Isabella Cannuscio / Ian Lorello	903	2008/2009 season (100%)	0	182	164	0	0
51	USA	Isabella Cannuscio / Ian Lorello	903	2007/2008 season (70%)	0	127	84	0	0
52	FRA	Pernelle Carron / Lloyd Jones	877	2009/2010 season (100%)	377	0	0	250	250
52	FRA	Pernelle Carron / Lloyd Jones	877	2008/2009 season (100%)	0	0	0	0	0
52	FRA	Pernelle Carron / Lloyd Jones	877	2007/2008 season (70%)	0	0	0	0	0
53	FRA	Zoe Blanc / Pierre-Loup Bouquet	874	2009/2010 season (100%)	214	0	0	182	164
53	FRA	Zoe Blanc / Pierre-Loup Bouquet	874	2008/2009 season (100%)	180	0	0	0	0
53	FRA	Zoe Blanc / Pierre-Loup Bouquet	874	2007/2008 season (70%)	0	134	0	0	0
54	GBR	Christina Chitwood / Mark Hanretty	846	2009/2010 season (100%)	118	0	0	203	182
54	GBR	Christina Chitwood / Mark Hanretty	846	2008/2009 season (100%)	140	0	0	203	0
54	GBR	Christina Chitwood / Mark Hanretty	846	2007/2008 season (70%)	0	0	0	0	0
55	EST	Caitlin Mallory / Kristjan Rand	824	2009/2010 season (100%)	237	191	0	0	0
55	EST	Caitlin Mallory / Kristjan Rand	824	2008/2009 season (100%)	214	0	0	182	0
55	EST	Caitlin Mallory / Kristjan Rand	824	2007/2008 season (70%)	0	0	0	0	0
56	UKR	Nadezhda Frolenkova / Mikhail Kasalo	800	2009/2010 season (100%)	0	0	0	164	0
56	UKR	Nadezhda Frolenkova / Mikhail Kasalo	800	2008/2009 season (100%)	0	0	0	203	164
56	UKR	Nadezhda Frolenkova / Mikhail Kasalo	800	2007/2008 season (70%)	0	142	127	0	0
57	CHN	Xueting Guan / Meng Wang	761	2009/2010 season (100%)	362	120	97	0	0
57	CHN	Xueting Guan / Meng Wang	761	2008/2009 season (100%)	182	0	0	0	0
57	CHN	Xueting Guan / Meng Wang	761	2007/2008 season (70%)	75	0	0	0	0
58	AUS	Maria Borounov / Evgeni Borounov	721	2009/2010 season (100%)	264	0	0	0	0
58	AUS	Maria Borounov / Evgeni Borounov	721	2008/2009 season (100%)	293	0	0	164	0
58	AUS	Maria Borounov / Evgeni Borounov	721	2007/2008 season (70%)	166	0	0	0	0
59	HUN	Dora Turoczi / Balazs Major	701	2009/2010 season (100%)	224	97	97	0	0
59	HUN	Dora Turoczi / Balazs Major	701	2008/2009 season (100%)	87	120	0	0	0
59	HUN	Dora Turoczi / Balazs Major	701	2007/2008 season (70%)	0	76	0	0	0
60	RUS	Tatiana Baturintseva / Ivan Volobuiev	682	2009/2010 season (100%)	0	203	182	0	0
60	RUS	Tatiana Baturintseva / Ivan Volobuiev	682	2008/2009 season (100%)	0	164	133	0	0
60	RUS	Tatiana Baturintseva / Ivan Volobuiev	682	2007/2008 season (70%)	0	93	0	0	0
61	FRA	Terra Findlay / Benoit Richaud	662	2009/2010 season (100%)	0	0	0	0	0
61	FRA	Terra Findlay / Benoit Richaud	662	2008/2009 season (100%)	277	203	182	0	0
61	FRA	Terra Findlay / Benoit Richaud	662	2007/2008 season (70%)	0	0	0	0	0
62	CAN	Tarrah Harvey / Keith Gagnon	654	2009/2010 season (100%)	0	0	0	0	0
62	CAN	Tarrah Harvey / Keith Gagnon	654	2008/2009 season (100%)	224	182	164	0	0
62	CAN	Tarrah Harvey / Keith Gagnon	654	2007/2008 season (70%)	0	84	0	0	0
63	AUS	Danielle O'Brien / Gregory Merriman	650	2009/2010 season (100%)	325	0	0	0	0
63	AUS	Danielle O'Brien / Gregory Merriman	650	2008/2009 season (100%)	325	0	0	0	0
63	AUS	Danielle O'Brien / Gregory Merriman	650	2007/2008 season (70%)	228	0	0	0	0
64	CAN	Olivia Nicole Martins / Alvin Chau	646	2009/2010 season (100%)	202	148	148	0	0
64	CAN	Olivia Nicole Martins / Alvin Chau	646	2008/2009 season (100%)	0	148	0	0	0
64	CAN	Olivia Nicole Martins / Alvin Chau	646	2007/2008 season (70%)	0	0	0	0	0
65	RUS	Ekaterina Riazanova / Ilia Tkachenko	643	2009/2010 season (100%)	0	236	0	225	182
65	RUS	Ekaterina Riazanova / Ilia Tkachenko	643	2008/2009 season (100%)	0	0	0	0	0
65	RUS	Ekaterina Riazanova / Ilia Tkachenko	643	2007/2008 season (70%)	0	0	0	0	0
66	GBR	Penny Coomes / Nicholas Buckland	626	2009/2010 season (100%)	173	0	0	203	182
66	GBR	Penny Coomes / Nicholas Buckland	626	2008/2009 season (100%)	0	0	0	0	0
66	GBR	Penny Coomes / Nicholas Buckland	626	2007/2008 season (70%)	0	68	0	0	0
67	FIN	Oksana Klimova / Sasha Palomäki	612	2009/2010 season (100%)	119	148	120	0	0
67	FIN	Oksana Klimova / Sasha Palomäki	612	2008/2009 season (100%)	92	133	0	0	0
67	FIN	Oksana Klimova / Sasha Palomäki	612	2007/2008 season (70%)	49	0	0	0	0
68	GER	Stefanie Frohberg / Tim Giesen	595	2009/2010 season (100%)	249	182	164	0	0
68	GER	Stefanie Frohberg / Tim Giesen	595	2008/2009 season (100%)	0	0	0	0	0
68	GER	Stefanie Frohberg / Tim Giesen	595	2007/2008 season (70%)	0	0	0	0	0
69	CAN	Andrea Chong / Guillaume Gfeller	564	2009/2010 season (100%)	0	191	0	0	0
69	CAN	Andrea Chong / Guillaume Gfeller	564	2008/2009 season (100%)	0	191	0	182	0
69	CAN	Andrea Chong / Guillaume Gfeller	564	2007/2008 season (70%)	0	0	0	0	0
70	UKR	Anastasia Galyeta / Alexei Shumski	545	2009/2010 season (100%)	342	133	0	0	0
70	UKR	Anastasia Galyeta / Alexei Shumski	545	2008/2009 season (100%)	70	0	0	0	0
70	UKR	Anastasia Galyeta / Alexei Shumski	545	2007/2008 season (70%)	0	0	0	0	0
71	ESP	Sara Hurtado / Adria Diaz	500	2009/2010 season (100%)	147	148	97	0	0
71	ESP	Sara Hurtado / Adria Diaz	500	2008/2009 season (100%)	0	108	0	0	0
71	ESP	Sara Hurtado / Adria Diaz	500	2007/2008 season (70%)	0	0	0	0	0
72	RUS	Victoria Sinitsina / Ruslan Zhiganshin	476	2009/2010 season (100%)	0	164	164	0	0
72	RUS	Victoria Sinitsina / Ruslan Zhiganshin	476	2008/2009 season (100%)	0	148	0	0	0
72	RUS	Victoria Sinitsina / Ruslan Zhiganshin	476	2007/2008 season (70%)	0	0	0	0	0
73	ARM	Anastasia Grebenkina / Vazgen Azrojan	472	2009/2010 season (100%)	0	0	0	0	0
73	ARM	Anastasia Grebenkina / Vazgen Azrojan	472	2008/2009 season (100%)	0	0	0	0	0
73	ARM	Anastasia Grebenkina / Vazgen Azrojan	472	2007/2008 season (70%)	0	165	165	142	0
74	RUS	Valeria Zenkova / Valerie Sinitsin	471	2009/2010 season (100%)	0	148	0	0	0
74	RUS	Valeria Zenkova / Valerie Sinitsin	471	2008/2009 season (100%)	0	203	120	0	0
74	RUS	Valeria Zenkova / Valerie Sinitsin	471	2007/2008 season (70%)	0	0	0	0	0
75	SVK	Nikola Visnova / Lukáš Csölley	449	2009/2010 season (100%)	113	120	0	0	0
75	SVK	Nikola Visnova / Lukáš Csölley	449	2008/2009 season (100%)	132	0	0	0	0
75	SVK	Nikola Visnova / Lukáš Csölley	449	2007/2008 season (70%)	92	84	0	0	0
76	GRE	Nikki Georgiadis / Graham Hockley	441	2009/2010 season (100%)	83	0	0	0	0
76	GRE	Nikki Georgiadis / Graham Hockley	441	2008/2009 season (100%)	164	97	97	0	0
76	GRE	Nikki Georgiadis / Graham Hockley	441	2007/2008 season (70%)	0	0	0	0	0
77	UZB	Maria Popkova / Viktor Kovalenko	427	2009/2010 season (100%)	63	148	0	0	0
77	UZB	Maria Popkova / Viktor Kovalenko	427	2008/2009 season (100%)	0	108	108	0	0
77	UZB	Maria Popkova / Viktor Kovalenko	427	2007/2008 season (70%)	0	0	0	0	0
78	CZE	Karolina Prochazkova / Michal Ceska	422	2009/2010 season (100%)	0	108	97	0	0
78	CZE	Karolina Prochazkova / Michal Ceska	422	2008/2009 season (100%)	0	120	97	0	0
78	CZE	Karolina Prochazkova / Michal Ceska	422	2007/2008 season (70%)	0	0	0	0	0
79	CAN	Veronique De Beaumont-Boisvert / Sebastien Buron	386	2009/2010 season (100%)	0	133	120	0	0
79	CAN	Veronique De Beaumont-Boisvert / Sebastien Buron	386	2008/2009 season (100%)	0	133	0	0	0
79	CAN	Veronique De Beaumont-Boisvert / Sebastien Buron	386	2007/2008 season (70%)	0	0	0	0	0
80	FRA	Geraldine Bott / Neil Brown	385	2009/2010 season (100%)	277	108	0	0	0
80	FRA	Geraldine Bott / Neil Brown	385	2008/2009 season (100%)	0	0	0	0	0
80	FRA	Geraldine Bott / Neil Brown	385	2007/2008 season (70%)	0	0	0	0	0
81	GBR	Phillipa Towler-Green / Phillip Poole	380	2009/2010 season (100%)	0	0	0	164	0
81	GBR	Phillipa Towler-Green / Phillip Poole	380	2008/2009 season (100%)	118	0	0	0	0
81	GBR	Phillipa Towler-Green / Phillip Poole	380	2007/2008 season (70%)	98	0	0	0	0
82	CHN	Jiayue Wang / Chongbo Gao	362	2009/2010 season (100%)	0	0	0	0	0
82	CHN	Jiayue Wang / Chongbo Gao	362	2008/2009 season (100%)	362	0	0	0	0
82	CHN	Jiayue Wang / Chongbo Gao	362	2007/2008 season (70%)	0	0	0	0	0
83	BLR	Ksenia Shmirina / Yahor Maistrov	329	2009/2010 season (100%)	0	0	0	0	0
83	BLR	Ksenia Shmirina / Yahor Maistrov	329	2008/2009 season (100%)	83	0	0	182	0
83	BLR	Ksenia Shmirina / Yahor Maistrov	329	2007/2008 season (70%)	64	0	0	0	0
84	RUS	Julia Zlobina / Alexei Sitnikov	313	2009/2010 season (100%)	0	0	0	0	0
84	RUS	Julia Zlobina / Alexei Sitnikov	313	2008/2009 season (100%)	0	0	0	164	0
84	RUS	Julia Zlobina / Alexei Sitnikov	313	2007/2008 season (70%)	0	149	0	0	0
85	UKR	Ruslana Jurchenko / Alexander Liubchenko	312	2009/2010 season (100%)	0	164	0	0	0
85	UKR	Ruslana Jurchenko / Alexander Liubchenko	312	2008/2009 season (100%)	0	148	0	0	0
85	UKR	Ruslana Jurchenko / Alexander Liubchenko	312	2007/2008 season (70%)	0	0	0	0	0
86	USA	Lauri Bonacorsi / Travis Mager	311	2009/2010 season (100%)	0	203	108	0	0
86	USA	Lauri Bonacorsi / Travis Mager	311	2008/2009 season (100%)	0	0	0	0	0
86	USA	Lauri Bonacorsi / Travis Mager	311	2007/2008 season (70%)	0	0	0	0	0
87	EST	Irina Shtork / Taavi Rand	309	2009/2010 season (100%)	118	0	0	0	0
87	EST	Irina Shtork / Taavi Rand	309	2008/2009 season (100%)	0	0	0	0	0
87	EST	Irina Shtork / Taavi Rand	309	2007/2008 season (70%)	55	68	68	0	0
88	USA	Charlotte Lichtman / Dean Copely	302	2009/2010 season (100%)	0	182	120	0	0
88	USA	Charlotte Lichtman / Dean Copely	302	2008/2009 season (100%)	0	0	0	0	0
88	USA	Charlotte Lichtman / Dean Copely	302	2007/2008 season (70%)	0	0	0	0	0
89	ITA	Federica Testa / Christopher Mior	295	2009/2010 season (100%)	92	0	0	203	0
89	ITA	Federica Testa / Christopher Mior	295	2008/2009 season (100%)	0	0	0	0	0
89	ITA	Federica Testa / Christopher Mior	295	2007/2008 season (70%)	0	0	0	0	0
90	MEX	Corenne Bruhns / Andrew Lavrik	293	2009/2010 season (100%)	293	0	0	0	0
90	MEX	Corenne Bruhns / Andrew Lavrik	293	2008/2009 season (100%)	0	0	0	0	0
90	MEX	Corenne Bruhns / Andrew Lavrik	293	2007/2008 season (70%)	0	0	0	0	0
91	GER	Tanja Kolbe / Sascha Rabe	291	2009/2010 season (100%)	0	0	0	0	0
91	GER	Tanja Kolbe / Sascha Rabe	291	2008/2009 season (100%)	0	0	0	164	0
91	GER	Tanja Kolbe / Sascha Rabe	291	2007/2008 season (70%)	0	0	0	127	0
92	USA	Anastasia Cannuscio / Colin McManus	266	2009/2010 season (100%)	0	133	133	0	0
92	USA	Anastasia Cannuscio / Colin McManus	266	2008/2009 season (100%)	0	0	0	0	0
92	USA	Anastasia Cannuscio / Colin McManus	266	2007/2008 season (70%)	0	0	0	0	0
93	POL	Justyna Plutowska / Dawid Pietrzynski	245	2009/2010 season (100%)	97	148	0	0	0
93	POL	Justyna Plutowska / Dawid Pietrzynski	245	2008/2009 season (100%)	0	0	0	0	0
93	POL	Justyna Plutowska / Dawid Pietrzynski	245	2007/2008 season (70%)	0	0	0	0	0
94	DEN	Katelyn Good / Nikolaj Sørensen	240	2009/2010 season (100%)	132	108	0	0	0
94	DEN	Katelyn Good / Nikolaj Sørensen	240	2008/2009 season (100%)	0	0	0	0	0
94	DEN	Katelyn Good / Nikolaj Sørensen	240	2007/2008 season (70%)	0	0	0	0	0
95	AUT	Sonja Pauli / Tobias Eisenbauer	234	2009/2010 season (100%)	87	0	0	0	0
95	AUT	Sonja Pauli / Tobias Eisenbauer	234	2008/2009 season (100%)	147	0	0	0	0
95	AUT	Sonja Pauli / Tobias Eisenbauer	234	2007/2008 season (70%)	0	0	0	0	0
96	GER	Ashley Foy / Benjamin Blum	225	2009/2010 season (100%)	0	0	0	0	0
96	GER	Ashley Foy / Benjamin Blum	225	2008/2009 season (100%)	0	0	0	0	0
96	GER	Ashley Foy / Benjamin Blum	225	2007/2008 season (70%)	141	84	0	0	0
96	USA	Lynn Kriengkrairut / Logan Giulietti-Schmitt	225	2009/2010 season (100%)	0	0	0	225	0
96	USA	Lynn Kriengkrairut / Logan Giulietti-Schmitt	225	2008/2009 season (100%)	0	0	0	0	0
96	USA	Lynn Kriengkrairut / Logan Giulietti-Schmitt	225	2007/2008 season (70%)	0	0	0	0	0
98	CHN	Yiyi Zhang / Nan Wu	216	2009/2010 season (100%)	0	108	108	0	0
98	CHN	Yiyi Zhang / Nan Wu	216	2008/2009 season (100%)	0	0	0	0	0
98	CHN	Yiyi Zhang / Nan Wu	216	2007/2008 season (70%)	0	0	0	0	0
99	CHN	Jiameimei Guo / Fei Meng	205	2009/2010 season (100%)	0	0	0	0	0
99	CHN	Jiameimei Guo / Fei Meng	205	2008/2009 season (100%)	0	0	0	0	0
99	CHN	Jiameimei Guo / Fei Meng	205	2007/2008 season (70%)	205	0	0	0	0
100	RUS	Natalia Mikhailova / Arkadi Sergeev	203	2009/2010 season (100%)	0	0	0	0	0
100	RUS	Natalia Mikhailova / Arkadi Sergeev	203	2008/2009 season (100%)	0	0	0	203	0
100	RUS	Natalia Mikhailova / Arkadi Sergeev	203	2007/2008 season (70%)	0	0	0	0	0
101	GER	Dominique Dieck / Michael Zenkner	198	2009/2010 season (100%)	0	120	0	0	0
101	GER	Dominique Dieck / Michael Zenkner	198	2008/2009 season (100%)	78	0	0	0	0
101	GER	Dominique Dieck / Michael Zenkner	198	2007/2008 season (70%)	0	0	0	0	0
102	CAN	Abby Carswell / Andrew Doleman	190	2009/2010 season (100%)	70	120	0	0	0
102	CAN	Abby Carswell / Andrew Doleman	190	2008/2009 season (100%)	0	0	0	0	0
102	CAN	Abby Carswell / Andrew Doleman	190	2007/2008 season (70%)	0	0	0	0	0
103	HUN	Krisztina Barta / Adam Toth	186	2009/2010 season (100%)	0	0	0	0	0
103	HUN	Krisztina Barta / Adam Toth	186	2008/2009 season (100%)	0	0	0	0	0
103	HUN	Krisztina Barta / Adam Toth	186	2007/2008 season (70%)	71	0	0	115	0
104	UZB	Sun Hye Yu / Ramil Sarkulov	185	2009/2010 season (100%)	0	0	0	0	0
104	UZB	Sun Hye Yu / Ramil Sarkulov	185	2008/2009 season (100%)	0	0	0	0	0
104	UZB	Sun Hye Yu / Ramil Sarkulov	185	2007/2008 season (70%)	185	0	0	0	0
105	CZE	Gabriela Kubova / Dmitri Kiselev	182	2009/2010 season (100%)	182	0	0	0	0
105	CZE	Gabriela Kubova / Dmitri Kiselev	182	2008/2009 season (100%)	0	0	0	0	0
105	CZE	Gabriela Kubova / Dmitri Kiselev	182	2007/2008 season (70%)	0	0	0	0	0
105	UKR	Alina Saprikina / Pavel Khimich	182	2009/2010 season (100%)	0	0	0	0	0
105	UKR	Alina Saprikina / Pavel Khimich	182	2008/2009 season (100%)	0	0	0	182	0
105	UKR	Alina Saprikina / Pavel Khimich	182	2007/2008 season (70%)	0	0	0	0	0
107	SUI	Leonie Krail / Oscar Peter	181	2009/2010 season (100%)	0	0	0	0	0
107	SUI	Leonie Krail / Oscar Peter	181	2008/2009 season (100%)	102	0	0	0	0
107	SUI	Leonie Krail / Oscar Peter	181	2007/2008 season (70%)	79	0	0	0	0
108	AUT	Kira Geil / Dmitri Matsjuk	180	2009/2010 season (100%)	180	0	0	0	0
108	AUT	Kira Geil / Dmitri Matsjuk	180	2008/2009 season (100%)	0	0	0	0	0
108	AUT	Kira Geil / Dmitri Matsjuk	180	2007/2008 season (70%)	0	0	0	0	0
109	GBR	Charlotte Aiken / Josh Whidborne	164	2009/2010 season (100%)	164	0	0	0	0
109	GBR	Charlotte Aiken / Josh Whidborne	164	2008/2009 season (100%)	0	0	0	0	0
109	GBR	Charlotte Aiken / Josh Whidborne	164	2007/2008 season (70%)	0	0	0	0	0
109	UKR	Siobhan Heekin-Canedy / Alexander Shakalov	164	2009/2010 season (100%)	0	0	0	164	0
109	UKR	Siobhan Heekin-Canedy / Alexander Shakalov	164	2008/2009 season (100%)	0	0	0	0	0
109	UKR	Siobhan Heekin-Canedy / Alexander Shakalov	164	2007/2008 season (70%)	0	0	0	0	0
109	USA	Trina Pratt / Chris Obzansky	164	2009/2010 season (100%)	0	0	0	164	0
109	USA	Trina Pratt / Chris Obzansky	164	2008/2009 season (100%)	0	0	0	0	0
109	USA	Trina Pratt / Chris Obzansky	164	2007/2008 season (70%)	0	0	0	0	0
109	SUI	Solene Pasztory / David Defazio	164	2009/2010 season (100%)	0	0	0	0	0
109	SUI	Solene Pasztory / David Defazio	164	2008/2009 season (100%)	0	0	0	164	0
109	SUI	Solene Pasztory / David Defazio	164	2007/2008 season (70%)	0	0	0	0	0
109	RUS	Evgenia Kosigina / Sergey Mozgov	164	2009/2010 season (100%)	0	164	0	0	0
109	RUS	Evgenia Kosigina / Sergey Mozgov	164	2008/2009 season (100%)	0	0	0	0	0
109	RUS	Evgenia Kosigina / Sergey Mozgov	164	2007/2008 season (70%)	0	0	0	0	0
114	RUS	Natalia Mikhailova / Andrei Maximishin	158	2009/2010 season (100%)	0	0	0	0	0
114	RUS	Natalia Mikhailova / Andrei Maximishin	158	2008/2009 season (100%)	0	0	0	0	0
114	RUS	Natalia Mikhailova / Andrei Maximishin	158	2007/2008 season (70%)	0	0	0	158	0
115	GEO	Allison Reed / Otar Japaridze	146	2009/2010 season (100%)	146	0	0	0	0
115	GEO	Allison Reed / Otar Japaridze	146	2008/2009 season (100%)	0	0	0	0	0
115	GEO	Allison Reed / Otar Japaridze	146	2007/2008 season (70%)	0	0	0	0	0
116	CAN	Carolyn Maccuish / Tyler Morris	133	2009/2010 season (100%)	0	133	0	0	0
116	CAN	Carolyn Maccuish / Tyler Morris	133	2008/2009 season (100%)	0	0	0	0	0
116	CAN	Carolyn Maccuish / Tyler Morris	133	2007/2008 season (70%)	0	0	0	0	0
116	UKR	Irina Babchenko / Vitali Nikiforov	133	2009/2010 season (100%)	0	133	0	0	0
116	UKR	Irina Babchenko / Vitali Nikiforov	133	2008/2009 season (100%)	0	0	0	0	0
116	UKR	Irina Babchenko / Vitali Nikiforov	133	2007/2008 season (70%)	0	0	0	0	0
116	USA	Shannon Wingle / Timothy McKernan	133	2009/2010 season (100%)	0	0	0	0	0
116	USA	Shannon Wingle / Timothy McKernan	133	2008/2009 season (100%)	0	133	0	0	0
116	USA	Shannon Wingle / Timothy McKernan	133	2007/2008 season (70%)	0	0	0	0	0
116	CAN	Catherine St. Onge / Alexander Brown	133	2009/2010 season (100%)	0	0	0	0	0
116	CAN	Catherine St. Onge / Alexander Brown	133	2008/2009 season (100%)	0	133	0	0	0
116	CAN	Catherine St. Onge / Alexander Brown	133	2007/2008 season (70%)	0	0	0	0	0
120	CAN	Siobhan Karam / Kevin O'Keefe	127	2009/2010 season (100%)	0	0	0	0	0
120	CAN	Siobhan Karam / Kevin O'Keefe	127	2008/2009 season (100%)	0	0	0	0	0
120	CAN	Siobhan Karam / Kevin O'Keefe	127	2007/2008 season (70%)	0	0	0	127	0
121	GER	Juliane Haslinger / Tom Finke	120	2009/2010 season (100%)	0	0	0	0	0
121	GER	Juliane Haslinger / Tom Finke	120	2008/2009 season (100%)	0	120	0	0	0
121	GER	Juliane Haslinger / Tom Finke	120	2007/2008 season (70%)	0	0	0	0	0
121	UKR	Maria Nosulia / Evgen Kholoniuk	120	2009/2010 season (100%)	0	0	0	0	0
121	UKR	Maria Nosulia / Evgen Kholoniuk	120	2008/2009 season (100%)	0	120	0	0	0
121	UKR	Maria Nosulia / Evgen Kholoniuk	120	2007/2008 season (70%)	0	0	0	0	0
123	GBR	Genevieve Deutch / Evan Roberts	119	2009/2010 season (100%)	0	0	0	0	0
123	GBR	Genevieve Deutch / Evan Roberts	119	2008/2009 season (100%)	119	0	0	0	0
123	GBR	Genevieve Deutch / Evan Roberts	119	2007/2008 season (70%)	0	0	0	0	0
124	CAN	Nicole Orford / Malcolm Rohon O'Halloran	108	2009/2010 season (100%)	0	108	0	0	0
124	CAN	Nicole Orford / Malcolm Rohon O'Halloran	108	2008/2009 season (100%)	0	0	0	0	0
124	CAN	Nicole Orford / Malcolm Rohon O'Halloran	108	2007/2008 season (70%)	0	0	0	0	0
124	UKR	Xenia Chepizhko / Sergei Shevchenko	108	2009/2010 season (100%)	0	0	0	0	0
124	UKR	Xenia Chepizhko / Sergei Shevchenko	108	2008/2009 season (100%)	0	108	0	0	0
124	UKR	Xenia Chepizhko / Sergei Shevchenko	108	2007/2008 season (70%)	0	0	0	0	0
126	BLR	Lesia Valadzenkava / Vitali Vakunov	97	2009/2010 season (100%)	0	0	0	0	0
126	BLR	Lesia Valadzenkava / Vitali Vakunov	97	2008/2009 season (100%)	0	97	0	0	0
126	BLR	Lesia Valadzenkava / Vitali Vakunov	97	2007/2008 season (70%)	0	0	0	0	0
126	GBR	Sarah Coward / Michael Coward	97	2009/2010 season (100%)	0	97	0	0	0
126	GBR	Sarah Coward / Michael Coward	97	2008/2009 season (100%)	0	0	0	0	0
126	GBR	Sarah Coward / Michael Coward	97	2007/2008 season (70%)	0	0	0	0	0
126	FRA	Tiffany Zahorski / Alexis Miart	97	2009/2010 season (100%)	0	97	0	0	0
126	FRA	Tiffany Zahorski / Alexis Miart	97	2008/2009 season (100%)	0	0	0	0	0
126	FRA	Tiffany Zahorski / Alexis Miart	97	2007/2008 season (70%)	0	0	0	0	0
129	FRA	Gabriella Papadakis / Guillaume Cizeron	78	2009/2010 season (100%)	78	0	0	0	0
129	FRA	Gabriella Papadakis / Guillaume Cizeron	78	2008/2009 season (100%)	0	0	0	0	0
129	FRA	Gabriella Papadakis / Guillaume Cizeron	78	2007/2008 season (70%)	0	0	0	0	0
130	CAN	Krista Wolfenden / Justin Trojek	76	2009/2010 season (100%)	0	0	0	0	0
130	CAN	Krista Wolfenden / Justin Trojek	76	2008/2009 season (100%)	0	0	0	0	0
130	CAN	Krista Wolfenden / Justin Trojek	76	2007/2008 season (70%)	0	76	0	0	0
131	EST	Kristina Kiudmaa / Aleksei Trohlev	58	2009/2010 season (100%)	0	0	0	0	0
131	EST	Kristina Kiudmaa / Aleksei Trohlev	58	2008/2009 season (100%)	0	0	0	0	0
131	EST	Kristina Kiudmaa / Aleksei Trohlev	58	2007/2008 season (70%)	58	0	0	0	0
132	BUL	Ina Demireva / Juri Kurakin	44	2009/2010 season (100%)	0	0	0	0	0
132	BUL	Ina Demireva / Juri Kurakin	44	2008/2009 season (100%)	0	0	0	0	0
132	BUL	Ina Demireva / Juri Kurakin	44	2007/2008 season (70%)	44	0	0	0	0

== See also ==
- ISU World Standings
- 2009–10 figure skating season
