= Estonian Figure Skating Championships =

Recurring national figure skating competition

- Status: Active
- Genre: National championships
- Frequency: Annual
- Country: Estonia
- Inaugurated: 1917
- Organizer: Estonian Skating Union

The Estonian Figure Skating Championships (Estonian: Eesti iluuisutamise meistrivõistlustel) are an annual figure skating competition organized by the Estonian Skating Union (Estonian: Eesti Uisuliit) to crown the national champions of Estonia. The first Estonian Championships were held in 1917 in Tallinn. There were numerous interruptions to the championships between 1940 and 1991 due to World War II and the Soviet occupation of Estonia. In 1991, after Estonia declared its independence from the Soviet Union, the Estonian Skating Union was founded and admitted as a member of the International Skating Union.

Medals are awarded in men's singles, women's singles, and ice dance at the senior and junior levels, although each discipline may not necessarily be held every year due to a lack of participants. There has not been competition in pair skating in Estonia since 2010. Alfred Hirv holds the record for winning the most Estonian Championship titles in men's singles (with ten), while Vaike Paduri holds the record in women's singles (with fourteen). Eduard Hiiop holds the record in pair skating (with ten), although these were not with the same partner. Nikolai Salnikov holds the record in ice dance (with eight), and also not with the same partner.

== History ==
Figure skating was practiced in Estonia as early as 1910, with media accounts of skating in Tallinn, Tartu, and Pärnu, although the first national championships were not held until 1917. The national championships initially consisted of events for men and pairs, although a separate event for women debuted in 1920. Skaters from Austria and Finland occasionally traveled to Tallinn to provide demonstrations for Estonian skaters; however, enrollment in figure skating in Estonia remained small.

Beginning in June 1940, Estonia was annexed by the Soviet Union. No championships were held between 1941 and 1946 due to the German occupation of Estonia during World War II. Following World War II, Estonia remained occupied by the Soviet Union. Estonian skaters were eligible to compete in the Soviet Figure Skating Championships. With fourteen Estonian Championship titles in women's singles, five in pair skating, and three in ice dance, Vaike Paduri (née Kaljuvee), was one of the most dominant skaters in Estonian history. She won the women's title at the Soviet Championships in 1945. She won an additional six silver medals at the Soviet Championships: four in the women's event and two in the ice dance event.

The first artificial ice rink in Estonia was built in 1959 in Kadriorg, a district of Tallinn. In 1961, a joint competition was held in Riga between Estonia and Latvia, which also served as their national championships. The top Estonian skaters at this event were recognized as the Estonian champions. Estonia declared its independence from the Soviet Union in August 1991. Until the Soviet occupation, figure skating had been overseen by the Estonian Winter Sports Union. In 1991, the Estonian Skating Union was founded and admitted as a member of the International Skating Union.

== Senior medalists ==
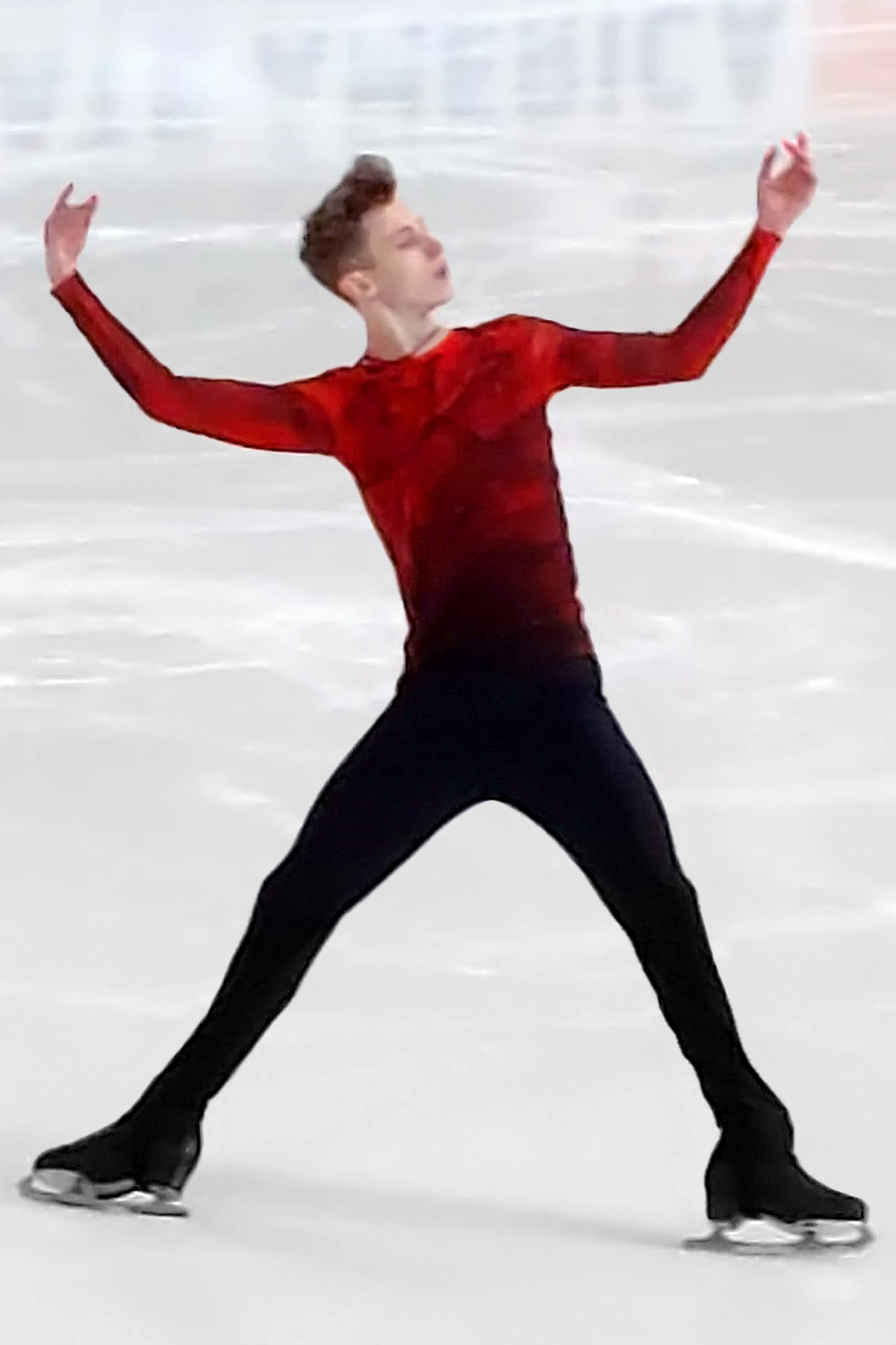
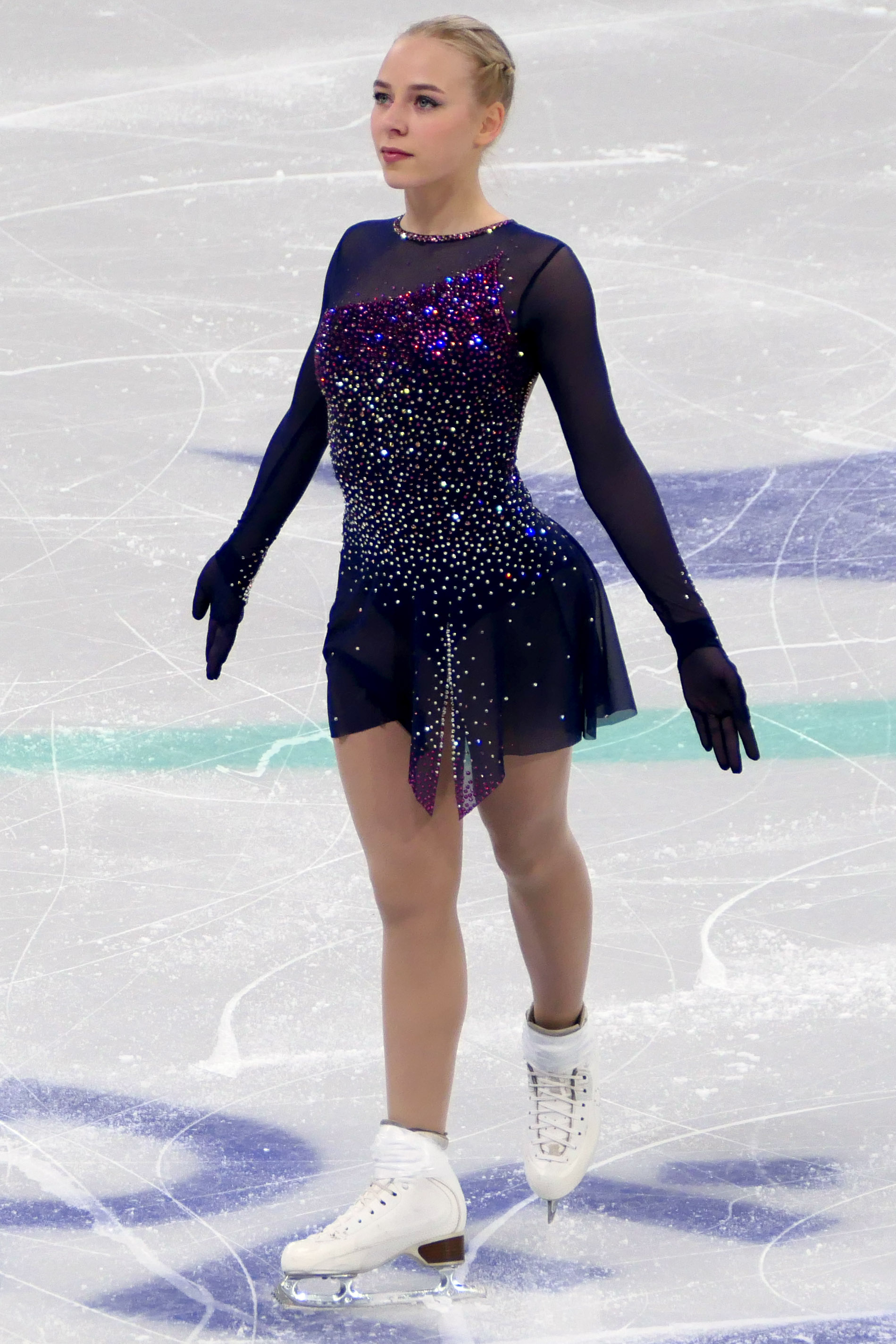
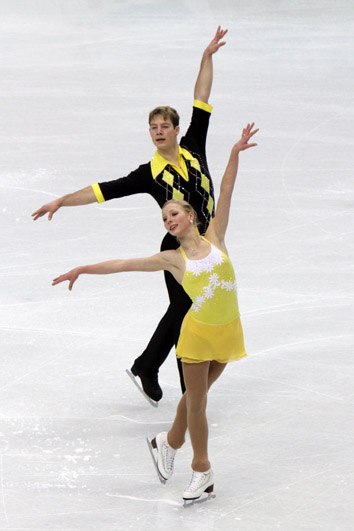
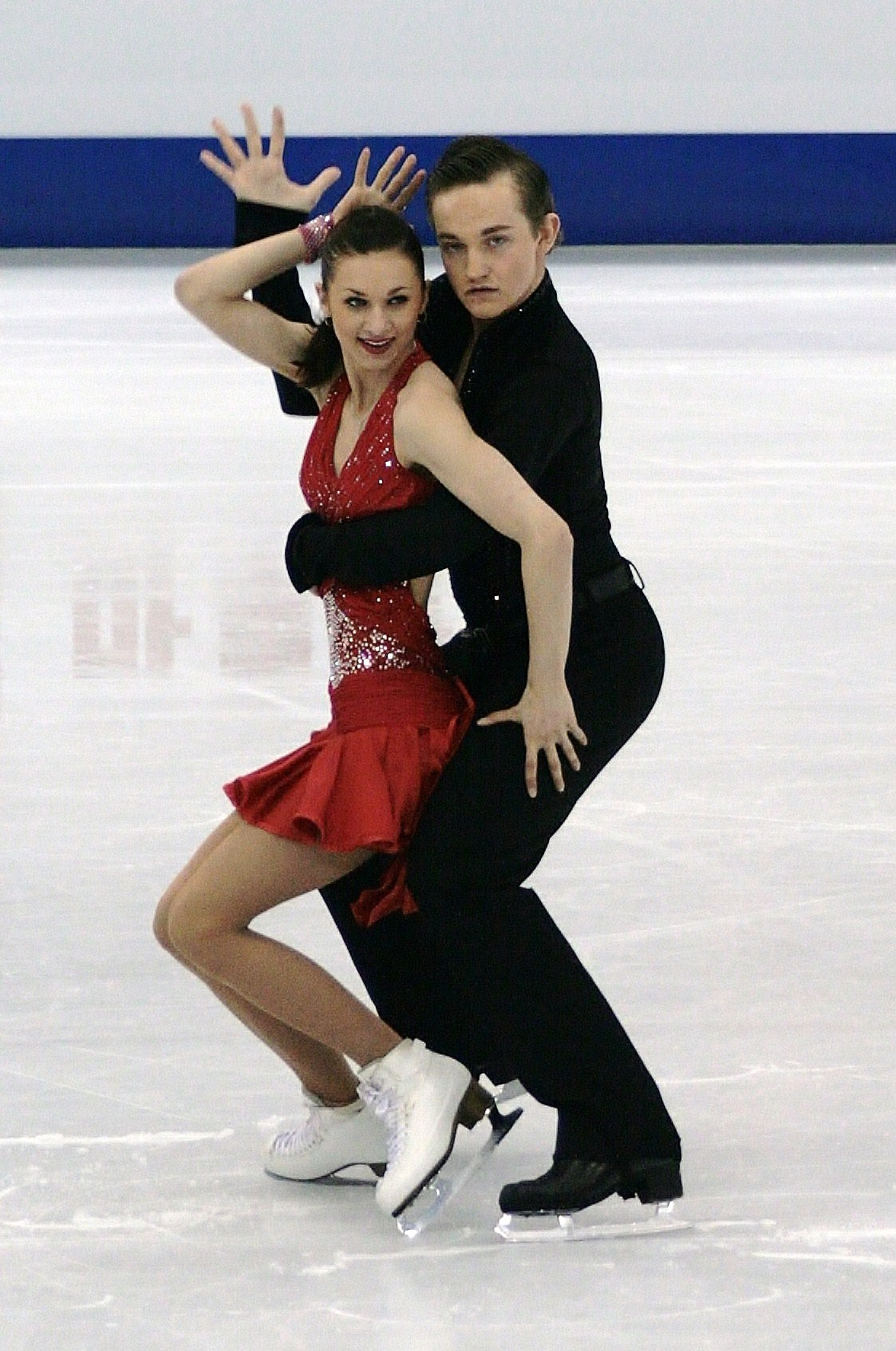
From left to right: Mihhail Selevko, four-time Estonian champion in men's singles; Niina Petrõkina, four-time Estonian champion in women's singles; Maria Sergejeva and Ilja Glebov, three-time Estonian champions in pair skating; and Irina Štork and Taavi Rand, five-time Estonian champions in ice dance

=== Men's singles ===
Since 2019, Mihhail Selevko has won the men's event four times (2019, 2023–2025), and his older brother Aleksandr has also won the event four times (2020–2022, 2026). Their friendly competitiveness has elevated the quality and status of figure skating in Estonia over the past several years. Mihhail Selevko stated in 2023 that "Estonian figure skating has made significant progress in the past few seasons, which is great to witness."

Senior men's event medalists
Year	Location	Gold	Silver	Bronze	Ref.
1917	Tallinn	Johannes Johanson	Eduard Kõppo	Adolf Feldmann	
1918	Tallinn	Eduard Kõppo	No other competitors		
1919	No competition held				
1920	Tartu	Aleksander Reeder	No other competitors		
1921	Tartu	Aleksander Reeder	Arthur Tedder	I. Peres	
1922	Tallinn	Arthur Tedder	Aleksander Reeder	Eduard Hiiop	
1923	Tallinn	Arthur Tedder	Friedrich Grünreich	Eduard Hiiop	
1924	Tallinn	Aleksander Reeder	Arthur Tedder	Friedrich Grünreich	
1925	No competition held				
1926	Tartu	Aleksander Reeder	Alfred Hirv	Eduard Hiiop	
1927	Tallinn	Aleksander Reeder	Eduard Hiiop	Voldemar Tomasson	
1928	Tallinn	Friedrich Grünreich	Eduard Hiiop	No other competitors	
1929	Tallinn	Alfred Hirv	Eduard Hiiop	No other competitors	
1930	Tartu	Alfred Hirv	Eduard Hiiop	No other competitors	
1931	Tallinn	Alfred Hirv	Voldemar Leinbock	Voldemar Tomasson	
1932	Tallinn	Alfred Hirv	Voldemar Leinbock	No other competitors	
1933	Tallinn	Alfred Hirv	Eduard Hiiop	Voldemar Leinbock	
1934	Tallinn	Alfred Hirv	Aleksander Daniel	Eduard Hiiop	
1935	Tallinn	Alfred Hirv	Eduard Hiiop	Voldemar Tomasson	
1936	Tallinn	Voldemar Tomasson	Eduard Hiiop	No other competitors	
1937	Tartu	Alfred Hirv	Valdur Toovere	Axel Auer	
1938	Tallinn	Alfred Hirv	Axel Auer	Valdur Toovere	
1939	No competition held				
1940	Tallinn	Alfred Hirv	Eugen Päsmel	Uno Zimmermann	
1941–46	No competitions due to World War II				
1947	Tallinn	Robert Kärsin	Vassili Krõlov	Vladimir Rodin	
1948	Tallinn	Robert Kärsin	No other competitors		
1949	Tallinn	Vladimir Radin	No other competitors		
1950	Tallinn	Robert Kärsin	No other competitors		
1951	Tallinn	Hillar Päsmel	No other competitors		
1952	Tallinn	Hillar Päsmel	No other competitors		
1953	Tallinn	No senior men's competitors			
1954	No competition held				
1955	Tallinn	Verner Oamer	Enno Oinus	No other competitors	
1956	Tallinn	Enno Oinus	Boris Merilain	No other competitors	
1957	Tallinn	Verner Oamer	Boris Merilain	Enno Oinus	
1958	Tallinn	Verner Oamer	Enno Oinus	Peeter Peterson	
1959	Tallinn	Ülo Sarapuu	Peeter Peterson	Rolf Pachel	
1960	Tallinn	Peeter Laur	Verner Oamer	No other competitors	
1961	(Latvia) Riga	Peep Piibar	Peeter Laur	Rolf Pachel	
1962	Tallinn	Verner Oamer	Peep Piibar	Rolf Pachel	
1963	Tallinn	Ülo Sarapuu	Peeter Laur	Peep Piibar	
1964	Tallinn	Peep Piibar	Rolf Pachel	Jaak Gross	
1965	Tallinn	Juhan Gross	Jaak Gross	Liivo Rennik	
1966	Tallinn	Jaak Gross	Liivo Rennik	Juhan Gross	
1967	Tallinn	Liivo Rennik	Ardo Rennik	Juhan Gross	
1968	Tallinn	Liivo Rennik	Jaak Gross	Arvo Lõoke	
1969	Tallinn	Liivo Rennik	Arvo Lõoke	Jaak Gross	
1970	Tallinn	Georgi Starkov	Hannes Teder	Igor Butenko	
1971	Tallinn	Hannes Teder	Igor Butenko	Peeter Kulkov	
1972	Tallinn	Igor Butenko	Peeter Kulkov	Märt Pappel	
1973	Tallinn	Hannes Teder	Viktor Bujevets	Peeter Kulkov	
1974	Tallinn	Hannes Teder	Peeter Kulkov	Viktor Bujevets	
1975	Tallinn	Viktor Bujevets	Peeter Kulkov	No other competitors	
1976–79	Tallinn	No senior men's competitors			
1980	Tallinn	Vladimir Taranuhha	Teet Ilves	No other competitors	
1981	Tallinn	Vladimir Taranuhha	Teet Ilves	No other competitors	
1982	Tallinn	Teet Ilves	Aleksandr Denissenko	Vladimir Taranuhha	
1983	Tallinn	Boriss Uspenski (Ukraine) (Note: Aleksandr Denissenko was named the 1983 Estonian champion, because he was the highest-scoring skater from Estonia.)	Aleksandr Lunin (Ukraine)	Samil Kurbangalijev (Ukraine)	
1984	Tallinn	Ruslan Kurganski	Toomas Künnapuu	No other competitors	
1985	Tallinn	Suren Ašhotojan	Toomas Künnapuu	Ruslan Kurganski	
1986	Tallinn	Suren Ašhotojan	Toomas Künnapuu	Raimo Reinsalu	
1987	Tallinn	Toomas Künnapuu	No other competitors		
1988	Tallinn	Juris Purinš (Latvia) (Note: Raimo Reinsalu was named the 1988 Estonian champion, because he was the highest-scoring skater from Estonia. Among the Estonian skaters, Margus Kulkov and Nikolai Dmitrijev were the second- and third-highest scorers, respectively.)	Andreis Vlaštšenko (Latvia)	Aleksandr Suvorov (Russia)	
1989	Tallinn	Raimo Reinsalu	Margus Kulkov	Roman Martõnenko	
1990	Tallinn	Roman Martõnenko	Raimo Reinsalu	Aleksandr Frolov	
1991	Tallinn	Alexei Kozlov	Roman Martõnenko	Margus Kulkov	
1992	Tallinn	Roman Martõnenko	Margus Hernits	No other competitors	
1993	Tallinn	Roman Martõnenko	Margus Hernits	Raimo Reinsalu	
1994	Tallinn	Margus Hernits	Roman Martõnenko	Alexei Kozlov	
1995	Tallinn	Margus Hernits	Roman Martõnenko	Raimo Reinsalu	
1996	Tallinn	Margus Hernits	Roman Martõnenko	Alexei Kozlov	
1997	Tallinn	Margus Hernits	Roman Martõnenko	Alexei Kozlov	
1998	Tallinn	Margus Hernits	Alexei Kozlov	Roman Martõnenko	
1999	Tallinn	Margus Hernits	Roman Martõnenko	Alexei Kozlov	
2000	Tallinn	Margus Hernits	Alexei Kozlov	Roman Martõnenko	
2001	Tallinn	Alexei Kozlov	Margus Hernits	Aleksei Saks	
2002	Tallinn	Margus Hernits	No other competitors		
2003	Tallinn	Alexei Kozlov	Dmitri Antoni	No other competitors	
2004	Tallinn	Alexei Kozlov	Denis Skrjabin	Aleksandr Kiudmaa	
2005–07	Tallinn	No senior men's competitors			
2008	Tartu	Viktor Romanenkov	No other competitors		
2009	Tartu	Viktor Romanenkov	Saulius Ambrulevičius (Lithuania)	No other competitors	
2010	Tallinn	Viktor Romanenkov	No other competitors		
2011	Narva	Artem Borodulin (Russia) (Note: Viktor Romanenkov, who finished in fourth place, was named the 2011 Estonian champion, because he was the highest-scoring skater from Estonia.)	Alexander Stepanov (Russia)	Vladislav Sesganov (Russia)	
2012	Tallinn	Viktor Romanenkov	Samuel Koppel	No other competitors	
2013	Tallinn	Viktor Romanenkov	Samuel Koppel	Daniel Albert Naurits	
2014	Tallinn	Viktor Romanenkov	Samuel Koppel	No other competitors	
2015	Tallinn	Samuel Koppel	Daniil Žurav	Aleksandr Selevko	
2016	Tallinn	Daniil Žurav	Aleksandr Selevko	Jegor Zelenjak	
2017	Tallinn	Daniel Albert Naurits	Daniil Žurav	Samuel Koppel	
2018	Tallinn	Daniel Albert Naurits	Samuel Koppel	No other competitors	
2019	Tallinn	Mihhail Selevko	Daniel Albert Naurits	Aleksandr Selevko	
2020	Tallinn	Aleksandr Selevko	Mihhail Selevko	Daniel Albert Naurits	
2021	Tallinn	Aleksandr Selevko	Arlet Levandi	Mihhail Selevko	
2022	Tallinn	Aleksandr Selevko	Arlet Levandi	Mihhail Selevko	
2023	Tallinn	Mihhail Selevko	Aleksandr Selevko	Arlet Levandi	
2024	Tallinn	Mihhail Selevko	Aleksandr Selevko	Arlet Levandi	
2025	Tallinn	Mihhail Selevko	Aleksandr Selevko	Arlet Levandi	
2026	Tallinn	Aleksandr Selevko	Mihhail Selevko	Arlet Levandi	

=== Women's singles ===
Senior women's event medalists
Year	Location	Gold	Silver	Bronze	Ref.
1917–19	No women's competitions held				
1920	Tartu	Tatjana Voitjankovskaja	No other competitors		
1921	Tartu	Tatjana Janson	Elvine Stamm	Ellen Frey	
1922	Tallinn	Hilda Leonova	Elvine Stamm	Ellen Frey	
1923	Tallinn	Hilda Leonova	Elvine Stamm	pr. Märk	
1924	Tallinn	Hilda Leonova	No other competitors		
1925	No competition held				
1926	Tartu	Ellen Frey	Hilja Martna	Elvine Stamm	
1927	Tallinn	Ellen Frey	Hilda Leonova	No other competitors	
1928	Tallinn	Helmi Kaarik	Gerda Bresinsky	No other competitors	
1929	Tallinn	Ottilie Markus	Alice Günther	No other competitors	
1930	Tartu	Vaike Paduri (née Kaljuvee)	Ottilie Markus	No other competitors	
1931	Tallinn	Vaike Paduri (née Kaljuvee)	Margarethe Precht	Adele Sallo	
1932	Tallinn	Vaike Paduri (née Kaljuvee)	No other competitors		
1933	Tallinn	Vaike Paduri (née Kaljuvee)	Adele Sallo	No other competitors	
1934	Tallinn	Vaike Paduri (née Kaljuvee)	Adele Sallo	No other competitors	
1935	Tallinn	Adele Sallo	Ottilie Markus	No other competitors	
1936	Tallinn	Vaike Paduri (née Kaljuvee)	Adele Toom	No other competitors	
1937	Tartu	Vaike Paduri (née Kaljuvee)	No other competitors		
1938	Tallinn	Vaike Paduri (née Kaljuvee)	Lia Villemson	Grace Saksen	
1939	No competition held				
1940	Tallinn	Vaike Paduri (née Kaljuvee)	Grace Saksen	Lia Villemson	
1941–46	No competitions due to World War II				
1947	Tallinn	Vaike Paduri (née Kaljuvee)	Dagmar Randna	Tatjana Semuhhina	
1948	Tallinn	Vaike Paduri (née Kaljuvee)	No other competitors		
1949	Tallinn	No senior women's competitors			
1950	Tallinn	Vaike Paduri (née Kaljuvee)	No other competitors		
1951	Tallinn	Vaike Paduri (née Kaljuvee)	Doris Liiva	No other competitors	
1952	Tallinn	Vaike Paduri (née Kaljuvee)	Gertrud Silberg	No other competitors	
1953	Tallinn	No senior women's competitors			
1954	No competition held				
1955	Tallinn	Küllike Vee	Aida Madar	Mall Allmann	
1956	Tallinn	Mall Allmann	Küllike Vee	Aida Madar	
1957	Tallinn	Mall Allmann	Küllike Vee	No other competitors	
1958	Tallinn	Anne Ritslaid	Reet Piibar	Mall Allmann	
1959	Tallinn	Anne Ritslaid	Reet Piibar	Tiiu Tamm	
1960	Tallinn	Anne Ritslaid	Reet Piibar	Tiiu Tamm	
1961	(Latvia) Riga	Reet Piibar	Lia Jertšuma (Latvia)	Tiiu Tamm	
1962	Tallinn	Reet Piibar	Tiiu Tamm	Anne Ritslaid	
1963	Tallinn	Tiiu Tomson	Ene Rausberg	Svetlana Zahharova	
1964	Tallinn	Tiiu Tomson	Madli Krispin	No other competitors	
1965	Tallinn	Tiiu Tomson	Madli Krispin	Ene Aurik	
1966	Tallinn	Madli Krispin	Tiiu Tomson	Maaja Metsküll	
1967	Tallinn	Madli Krispin	Eha Elvest	Maaja Metsküll	
1968	Tallinn	Pille Hagel	Maaja Metsküll	Eha Elvest	
1969	Tallinn	Pille Hagel	Maaja Metsküll	Eha Elvest	
1970	Tallinn	Pille Hagel	Eha Elvest	Julia Venjovtseva	
1971	Tallinn	Pille Hagel	Galja Tairova	Maaja Metsküll	
1972	Tallinn	Pille Hagel	Larissa Kortšanova	Julia Venjovtseva	
1973	Tallinn	Olga Voložinskaja	Larissa Kortšanova	Anu Leps	
1974	Tallinn	Olga Voložinskaja	Larissa Kortšanova	Jelena Jevdossenko	
1975	Tallinn	Olga Voložinskaja	Larissa Kortšanova	Viktoria Leontjeva	
1976	Tallinn	Olga Voložinskaja	Svetlana Savitskaja	Viktoria Leontjeva	
1977	Tallinn	Svetlana Savitskaja	Žanna Senina	Anu Lüke	
1978	Tallinn	Inna Marudenko	Svetlana Šarova	Signe Feklistova	
1979	Tallinn	Inna Marudenko	Žanetta Tšubenko	Signe Feklistova	
1980	Tallinn	Inna Marudenko	Žanetta Tšubenko	Signe Feklistova	
1981	Tallinn	Žanetta Tšubenko	Signe Feklistova	Marina Voronko	
1982	Tallinn	Žanetta Tšubenko	Irina Vassiljeva	Marina Voronko	
1983	Tallinn	Žanetta Tšubenko	Ljudmila Jaštšuk (Ukraine)	Kristel Freivald	
1984	Tallinn	Kristel Ojasaar	L. Pruss	Sylvi Keerde	
1985	Tallinn	Kristel Freivald	Heli Štarkov	Sylvi Keerde	
1986	Tallinn	Žanetta Tšubenko	Kristel Ojasaar	Marika Gribanova	
1987	Tallinn	Oksana Hutornaja	Heli Štarkov	Sylvi Keerde	
1988	Tallinn	Oksana Hutornaja	Heli Štarkov	Nadežda Kiridi	
1989	Tallinn	Oksana Hutornaja	Gajane Akopyan (Russia)	Svetlana Kulitšenko	
1990	Tallinn	Oksana Hutornaja	Marika Gribanova	Olga Vassiljeva	
1991	Tallinn	Olga Vassiljeva	Oksana Hutornaja	Svetlana Kulitšenko	
1992	Tallinn	Oksana Hutornaja	Tatjana Fedotova	Anna Nekrassova	
1993	Tallinn	Olga Vassiljeva	No other competitors		
1994	Tallinn	Olga Vassiljeva	Jekaterina Golovatenko	Liina-Grete Lilender	
1995	Tallinn	Jekaterina Golovatenko	Liina-Grete Lilender	Olga Vassiljeva	
1996	Tallinn	Olga Vassiljeva	Liina-Grete Lilender	Jekaterina Golovatenko	
1997	Tallinn	Liina-Grete Lilender	Valeria Trifancova (Latvia)	Jekaterina Golovatenko	
1998	Tallinn	Olga Vassiljeva	Jekaterina Golovatenko	Liina-Grete Lilender	
1999	Tallinn	Olga Vassiljeva	Jekaterina Golovatenko	Liina-Grete Lilender	
2000	Tallinn	Olga Vassiljeva	Jekaterina Golovatenko	Liina-Grete Lilender	
2001	Tallinn	Olga Vassiljeva	Jekaterina Golovatenko	Liina-Grete Lilender	
2002	Tallinn	Olga Vassiljeva	Liina-Grete Lilender	Maria Levitan	
2003	Tallinn	Olga Vassiljeva	Liina-Grete Lilender	Jelena Abolina	
2004	Tallinn	Jelena Glebova	Olga Vassiljeva	Liina-Grete Lilender	
2005	Tallinn	Jelena Glebova	Sanna Remes	Jelena Muhhina	
2006	Tallinn	Jelena Muhhina	Jelena Glebova	Olga Ikonnikova	
2007	Tallinn	Jelena Glebova	Svetlana Issakova	Jelena Muhhina	
2008	Tartu	Svetlana Issakova	Johanna Allik	Olga Ikonnikova	
2009	Tartu	Jelena Glebova	Jasmine Alexandra Costa	Johanna Allik	
2010	Tallinn	Jelena Glebova	Johanna Allik	Svetlana Issakova	
2011	Narva	Gerli Liinamäe	Svetlana Issakova	Jelena Glebova	
2012	Tallinn	Jelena Glebova	Gerli Liinamäe	Svetlana Issakova	
2013	Tallinn	Jelena Glebova	Svetlana Issakova	Helery Hälvin	
2014	Tallinn	Helery Hälvin	Gerli Liinamäe	Eike Langerbaur	
2015	Tallinn	Gerli Liinamäe	Helery Hälvin	Diana Reinsalu	
2016	Tallinn	Helery Hälvin	Jelizaveta Leonova	Kristina Škuleta-Gromova	
2017	Tallinn	Helery Hälvin	Gerli Liinamäe	Annely Vahi	
2018	Tallinn	Gerli Liinamäe	Kristina Škuleta-Gromova	Eva-Lotta Kiibus	
2019	Tallinn	Gerli Liinamäe	Eva-Lotta Kiibus	Kristina Škuleta-Gromova	
2020	Tallinn	Eva-Lotta Kiibus	Niina Petrõkina	Amalia Zelenjak	
2021	Tallinn	Eva-Lotta Kiibus	Gerli Liinamäe	Kristina Lisovskaja	
2022	Tallinn	Niina Petrõkina	Eva-Lotta Kiibus	Nataly Langerbaur	
2023	Tallinn	Niina Petrõkina	Nataly Langerbaur	Gerli Liinamäe	
2024	Tallinn	Elina Goidina	Nataly Langerbaur	Kristina Lisovskaja	
2025	Tallinn	Niina Petrõkina	Elina Goidina	Maria Eliise Kaljuvere	
2026	Tallinn	Niina Petrõkina	Nataly Langerbaur	Kristina Lisovskaja	

=== Pairs ===
Senior pairs' event medalists
Year	Location	Gold	Silver	Bronze	Ref.
1917	Tallinn	Hilda Laane; Johannes Johanson	No other competitors		
1918–19	No competitions held				
1920	Tartu	Tatjana Voitjankovskaja; I. Peres	No other competitors		
1921	Tartu	Tatjana Janson; I. Peres	Elvine Stamm; Eduard Hiiop	Ellen Frey; Aleksander Reeder	
1922	Tallinn	Ellen Frey; Aleksander Reeder	Elvine Stamm; Arthur Tedder	Hilda Laane; Eduard Hiiop	
1923	Tallinn	Hilda Laane-Leonova; Eduard Hiiop	Elvine Stamm; Arthur Tedder	pr. Märk; Friedrich Grünreich	
1924	Tallinn	Hilda Laane-Leonova; Eduard Hiiop	pr. Wollmann; Friedrich Grünreich	pr. Mõttus; Voldemar Tomasson	
1925	No competition held				
1926	Tartu	Ellen Frey; Aleksander Reeder	Hilda Leonova; Eduard Hiiop	pr. Mõttus; Voldemar Tomasson	
1927	Tallinn	Ellen Frey; Aleksander Reeder	Hilda Leonova; Eduard Hiiop	pr. Mõttus; Voldemar Tomasson	
1928	Tallinn	Helmi Kaarik; Eduard Hiiop	Helene Michelson; Friedrich Grünreich	No other competitors	
1929	Tallinn	Helene Michelson; Eduard Hiiop	Alice Günther; Arthur Tedder	No other competitors	
1930	Tartu	Helene Michelson; Eduard Hiiop	No other competitors		
1931	Tallinn	Helene Michelson; Eduard Hiiop	Ottilie Markus; Aleksander Reeder	No other competitors	
1932	Tallinn	Vaike Paduri (née Kaljuvee); Alfred Hirv	Helene Michelson; Eduard Hiiop	No other competitors	
1933	Tallinn	Helene Michelson; Eduard Hiiop	Ottilie Markus; Aleksander Reeder	No other competitors	
1934	Tallinn	Helene Michelson; Eduard Hiiop	No other competitors		
1935	Tallinn	Helene Michelson; Eduard Hiiop	Ottilie Markus; Alfred Hirv	No other competitors	
1936	Tallinn	Helene Michelson; Eduard Hiiop	No other competitors		
1937	Tartu	Vaike Paduri (née Kaljuvee); Robert Kärsin	No other competitors		
1938	Tallinn	Vaike Paduri (née Kaljuvee); Alfred Hirv	Grace Saksen; Robert Kärsin	Evi Uuetoa; Eugen Päsmel	
1939	No competition held				
1940	Tallinn	Vaike Paduri (née Kaljuvee); Alfred Hirv	Grace Saksen; Robert Kärsin	No other competitors	
1941–46	No competitions due to World War II				
1947	Tallinn	Tatjana Semuhhina; Vassili Krõlov	Vaike Paduri (née Kaljuvee); Vladimir Rodin	No other competitors	
1948	Tallinn	Vaike Paduri (née Kaljuvee); Vladimir Rodin	No other competitors		
1949	Tallinn	Milvi Urm; Hillar Päsmel	No other competitors		
1950	Tallinn	No senior pairs competitors			
1951	Tallinn	Milvi Urm; Olimar Kangur	No other competitors		
1952	Tallinn	No senior pairs competitors			
1953	Tallinn	Ivi Metsakivi; Leili Muska	Mall Allmann; Tiiu Haamre	No other competitors	
1954	No competition held				
1955	Tallinn	Ly Piir; Raul Merilain	No other competitors		
1956	Tallinn	Aida Madar; Enno Oinus	Ly Piir; Boris Merilain	No other competitors	
1957	Tallinn	Küllike Vee; Boris Merilain	Aida Kivi; Enno Oinus	No other competitors	
1958	Tallinn	No senior pairs competitors			
1959	Tallinn	Küllike Vee; Enn Veinpere	Aida Kivi; Enno Oinus	Reet Piibar; Rolf Pachel	
1960	Tallinn	Küllike Vee; Enn Veinpere	Aida Kivi; Enno Oinus	No other competitors	
1961	(Latvia) Riga	Küllike Vee; Ülo Sarapuu	Svetlana Zahharova; Ardo Rennik	No other competitors	
1962	Tallinn	Küllike Vee; Ülo Sarapuu	Madli Krispin; Hagi Šein	No other competitors	
1963	Tallinn	Küllike Vee; Ülo Sarapuu	Svetlana Zahharova; Ardo Rennik	Anne Piir; Heinar Randrüüt	
1964	Tallinn	Svetlana Zahharova; Ardo Rennik	V. Kudrjašova; Juhan Gross	No other competitors	
1965	Tallinn	Eha Elvest; Juhan Gross	No other competitors		
1966	Tallinn	Eha Elvest; Juhan Gross	Madli Krispin; Jaak Gross	Sirje Tasamaa; Liivo Rennik	
1967	Tallinn	Eha Elvest; Juhan Gross	Tiina Gross; Jaak Gross	Külliki Pall; Väino Tartes	
1968	Tallinn	Tiina Gross; Jaak Gross	Külliki Pall; Väino Tartes	Eha Elvest; Pavel Polonski	
1969	Tallinn	Tiina Gross; Jaak Gross	Külliki Pall; Liivo Rennik	Eha Elvest; Pavel Polonski	
1970	Tallinn	Tiina Gross; Jaak Gross	Eha Elvest; Pavel Polonski	No other competitors	
1971	Tallinn	Tiina Gross; Jaak Gross	No other competitors		
1972–79	Tallinn	No senior pairs competitors			
1980	Tallinn	Irina Patalahha; Vladimir Taranuhha	Marje Pajulaid; Teet Ilves	No other competitors	
1981–95	Tallinn	No senior pairs competitors			
1996	Tallinn	Ekaterina Nekrassova; Valdis Mintals	No other competitors		
1997	Tallinn	Ekaterina Nekrassova; Valdis Mintals	No other competitors		
1998	Tallinn	No senior pairs competitors			
1999	Tallinn	Viktoria Šklover; Valdis Mintals	No other competitors		
2000	Tallinn	Viktoria Šklover; Valdis Mintals	No other competitors		
2001	Tallinn	Viktoria Šklover; Valdis Mintals	No other competitors		
2002	Tallinn	Viktoria Šklover; Valdis Mintals	Diana Rennik; Aleksei Saks	No other competitors	
2003	Tallinn	Diana Rennik; Aleksei Saks	No other competitors		
2004	Tallinn	Diana Rennik; Aleksei Saks	No other competitors		
2005	Tallinn	Diana Rennik; Aleksei Saks	No other competitors		
2006	Tallinn	Diana Rennik; Aleksei Saks	No other competitors		
2007	Tallinn	Maria Sergejeva; Ilja Glebov	Diana Rennik; Aleksei Saks	No other competitors	
2008	Tartu	Maria Sergejeva; Ilja Glebov	No other competitors		
2009	Tartu	Maria Sergejeva; Ilja Glebov	No other competitors		
2010	Tallinn	Natalia Zabiiako; Sergei Muhhin	No other competitors		
No senior pairs competitors since 2010

=== Ice dance ===
Senior ice dance event medalists
Year	Location	Gold	Silver	Bronze	Ref.
1948	Tallinn	Vaike Paduri (née Kaljuvee); Robert Kärsin	Silvia Vannas; Vladimir Rodin	No other competitors	
1949	Tallinn	No ice dance competitors			
1950	Tallinn	Vaike Paduri (née Kaljuvee); Robert Kärsin	No other competitors		
1951	Tallinn	Ly Rooba; Elmar Jääger	Benita Parri; Ants Kivilo	No other competitors	
1952	Tallinn	Maia Temmin; Rein Märtsoo	Küllike Vee; Jüri Teras	Aida Madar; T. Vee	
1953	Tallinn	Vaike Paduri (née Kaljuvee); Vladimir Rodin	Ivi Metsakivi; Leili Muska	No other competitors	
1954	No competition held				
1955	Tallinn	Aida Madar & Ly Piir (tied) (Note: Solo ice dance)	No silver medals awarded	No other competitors	
1956	Tallinn	Anne Ronk & Küllike Vee (tied)	No silver medals awarded	Ly Piir	
1957	Tallinn	Küllike Vee	Anne Ronk	Reet Piibar	
1958	Tallinn	No ice dance competitors			
1959	Tallinn	Aida Kivi; Enno Oinus	No other competitors		
1960	Tallinn	K. Aru	Anne Ronk	H. Aurik	
1961	(Latvia) Riga	Helle Merisalu	No other competitors		
1962	Tallinn	No ice dance competitors			
1963	Tallinn	Anne Ronk; Peeter Laur	No other competitors		
1964	Tallinn	Natalia Faidenko; Aleksandr Rebrikov	No other competitors		
1965	Tallinn	Anne Šaraškin; Peeter Laur	No other competitors		
1966	Tallinn	Anne Šaraškin; Peeter Laur	Helle Merisalu; Sven Liivrand	Natalja Faidenko; Valentin Kosteljov	
1967	Tallinn	Anne Šaraškin; Peeter Laur	Helle Merisalu; Harry Šein	Pille Hagel; Arvo Lõoke	
1968	Tallinn	Anne Šaraškin; Peeter Laur	Tiina Kongas; Harry Šein	Natalja Faidenko; Sven Liivrand	
1969	Tallinn	Anne Šaraškin; Peeter Laur	Tiina Kongas; Harry Šein	Natalja Faidenko; Sven Liivrand	
1970	Tallinn	Tiina Kongas; Harry Šein	Natalia Tokareva; Nikolai Salnikov	Anne Naissoo; Toomas Rang	
1971	Tallinn	Natalia Tokareva; Nikolai Salnikov	No other competitors		
1972	Tallinn	Natalia Tokareva; Nikolai Salnikov	Anne Naissoo; Toomas Rang	No other competitors	
1973	Tallinn	Natalia Tokareva; Nikolai Salnikov	No other competitors		
1974	Tallinn	Natalia Tokareva; Nikolai Salnikov	Anne Naissoo; Toomas Rang	Marina Birova; Rainer Gornoi	
1975	Tallinn	Tamara Prokopjuk; Nikolai Salnikov	Marina Birova; Rainer Gornoi	No other competitors	
1976	Tallinn	Tamara Prokopjuk; Nikolai Salnikov	Natalia Tokareva; Toomas Rang	Marina Birova; Rainer Gornoi	
1977	Tallinn	Tamara Prokopjuk; Nikolai Salnikov	No other competitors		
1978	Tallinn	Tamara Prokopjuk; Nikolai Salnikov	Lea Rohlin; Leonid Nikolajev	No other competitors	
1979	Tallinn	Valeria Trifonova; Andrei Malofejev	Lea Rohlin; Viljar Orub	No other competitors	
1980	Tallinn	Valeria Trifonova; Andrei Malofejev	Lea Rohlin; Viljar Orub	No other competitors	
1981	Tallinn	Valeria Trifonova; Andrei Malofejev	No other competitors		
1982	Tallinn	Valeria Trifonova; Andrei Malofejev	Lea Rohlin; Viljar Orub	No other competitors	
1983	Tallinn	(Russia); Elena Vasyukova; Dmitry Blyakhman; (Russia) (Note: There were no 1983 Estonian champions in the ice dance event, because all of the competitors were guest teams.)	(Ukraine); Julia Moskalskaja; Oleg Drjumov; (Ukraine)	(Ukraine); Svetlana Jaromova; Leonid Rženko; (Ukraine)	
1984	Tallinn	Rena Paulus; Vahur Fuks	Angela Berkov; Sergei Solovjov	K. Ljaštšenko; A. Popov	
1985	Tallinn	Rena Paulus; Vahur Fuks	Angela Berkov; Sergei Solovjov	Julia Semjonova; Aleksandr Jarovoi	
1986	Tallinn	Kristina Ljašenko; Vahur Fuks	Julia Semjonova; Ruslan Kurganski	No other competitors	
1987	Tallinn	Julia Semjonova; Ruslan Kurganski	Sofia Varkki; Vahur Fuks	No other competitors	
1988	Tallinn	(Russia); Irina Saršavina; Konstantin Konov; (Russia) (Note: Julia Semjonova and Ruslan Kurganski were named the 1988 Estonian champions, because they were the highest-scoring team from Estonia.)	(Russia); Irina Lebed; Juris Rassuljaev; (Russia)	Julia Semjonova; Ruslan Kurganski	
1989	Tallinn	Larissa Uvarova; Denis Tištšenko	No other competitors		
1990	Tallinn	(Latvia); Anna Joffe; Vassili Serkov; (Latvia) (Note: Larissa Uvarova and Ruslan Kurganski were named the 1990 Estonian champions, because Anna Joffe and Vassili Serkov, the first-place finishers, were guest skaters from Latvia.)	Larissa Uvarova; Ruslan Kurganski	No other competitors	
1991–92	Tallinn	No ice dance competitors			
1993	Tallinn	Anna Mosenkova; Dmitri Kurakin	No other competitors		
1994	Tallinn	Anna Mosenkova; Dmitri Kurakin	No other competitors		
1995	Tallinn	Anna Mosenkova; Dmitri Kurakin	No other competitors		
1996	Tallinn	Anna Mosenkova; Dmitri Kurakin	Kristina Kalesnik; Aleksandr Terentjev	No other competitors	
1997	Tallinn	Kristina Kalesnik; Aleksandr Terentjev	Anna Mosenkova; Dmitri Kurakin	Marina Timofeieva; Evgeni Striganov	
1998	Tallinn	Kristina Kalesnik; Aleksandr Terentjev	Marina Timofeieva; Evgeni Striganov	No other competitors	
1999	Tallinn	Kristina Kalesnik; Aleksandr Terentjev	Darja Monoilo; Vassili Baranov	Jelena Solonikova; Jevgeni Polištšuk	
2000	Tallinn	No ice dance competitors			
2001	Tallinn	Anna Mosenkova; Sergei Sõtšov	No other competitors		
2002	Tallinn	Anna Mosenkova; Sergei Sõtšov	No other competitors		
2003	Tallinn	Marina Timofeieva; Evgeni Striganov	No other competitors		
2004	Tallinn	Grethe Grünberg; Kristjan Rand	Julia Abolina; Aleksandr Škirin	Aleksandra Baurina; Juri Kurakin	
2005	Tallinn	No ice dance competitors			
2006	Tallinn	Aleksandra Baurina; Ilja Korešev	No other competitors		
2007	Tallinn	Grethe Grünberg; Kristjan Rand	No other competitors		
2008	Tartu	No ice dance competitors			
2009	Tartu	Kristina Kiudmaa; Aleksei Trohlev	No other competitors		
2010	Tallinn	Irina Štork; Taavi Rand	No other competitors		
2011	Narva	(Azerbaijan); Julia Zlobina; Alexei Sitnikov; (Azerbaijan) (Note: Irina Štork and Taavi Rand were named the 2011 Estonian champions, because Julia Zlobina and Alexei Sitnikov, the first-place finishers, were guest skaters from Azerbaijan.)	Irina Štork; Taavi Rand	No other competitors	
2012	Tallinn	Irina Štork; Taavi Rand	Hanna Maria Tammo; Geido Kapp	No other competitors	
2013	Tallinn	Irina Štork; Taavi Rand	No other competitors		
2014	Tallinn	No ice dance competitors			
2015	Tallinn	Irina Štork; Taavi Rand	Marina Elias; Denis Koreline	Viktoria Semenjuk; Artur Gruzdev	
2016	Tallinn	Marina Elias; Denis Koreline	Viktoria Semenjuk; Artur Gruzdev	Katerina Bunina; German Frolov	
2017	Tallinn	Katerina Bunina; German Frolov	Marina Elias; Geido Kapp	No other competitors	
2018	Tallinn	Viktoria Semenjuk; Artur Gruzdev	Katerina Bunina; German Frolov	No other competitors	
2019	Tallinn	Katerina Bunina; German Frolov	No other competitors		
2020	Tallinn	Tatjana Bunina; Ivan Kuznetsov	Darja Netjaga; Marko Jevgeni Gaidajenko	No other competitors	
2021	Tallinn	No ice dance competitors			
2022	Tallinn	Solène Mazingue; Marko Jevgeni Gaidajenko	Aleksandra Samersova; Kevin Ojala	No other competitors	
2023	Tallinn	No ice dance competitors			
2024	Tallinn	Solène Mazingue; Marko Jevgeni Gaidajenko	No other competitors		
2025–26	Tallinn	No ice dance competitors			

== Junior medalists ==
=== Men's singles ===
Junior men's event medalists
Year	Location	Gold	Silver	Bronze	Ref.
1996	Tallinn	Alexei Kozlov	No other competitors		
1997	Tallinn	Alexei Kozlov	Aleksei Saks	Dmitri Mihharovski	
1998	Tallinn	Alexei Kozlov	Aleksei Saks	Dmitri Antoni	
1999	Tallinn	No junior men's competitors			
2000	Tallinn	Aleksei Saks	Dmitri Antoni	No other competitors	
2001	Tallinn	Aleksei Saks	Dmitri Antoni	No other competitors	
2002	Tallinn	Dmitri Antoni	No other competitors		
2003	Tallinn	Dmitri Antoni	Ilja Glebov	No other competitors	
2004	Tallinn	Aleksandr Kiudmaa	No other competitors		
2005	Tallinn	Viktor Romanenkov	Sergei Muhhin	No other competitors	
2006	Tallinn	Sergei Muhhin	Viktor Kolesnikov	No other competitors	
2007	Tallinn	Viktor Romanenkov	Sergei Muhhin	No other competitors	
2008	Tartu	Viktor Romanenkov	Sergei Muhhin	No other competitors	
2009	Tartu	Samuel Koppel	No other competitors		
2010	Tallinn	Viktor Romanenkov	Allar Laane	No other competitors	
2011	Tallinn	Viktor Romanenkov	No other competitors		
2012	Tallinn	Daniel Albert Naurits	German Frolov	No other competitors	
2013	Tartu	Samuel Koppel	Mihhail Sokolov	Maksim Pekki	
2014	Tallinn	Daniil Žurav	Samuel Koppel	Jegor Zelenjak	
2015	Tallinn	Jegor Zelenjak	Daniil Žurav	Aleksandr Selevko	
2016	Tallinn	Daniel Albert Naurits	Aleksandr Selevko	Daniil Žurav	
2017	Tallinn	Daniel Albert Naurits	Aleksandr Selevko	Mihhail Selevko	
2018	Tallinn	Aleksandr Selevko	Mihhail Selevko	Ivan Mikhajlov	
2019	Tallinn	Mihhail Selevko	No other competitors		
2020	Tallinn	Aleksandr Selevko	Mihhail Selevko	Arlet Levandi	
2021	Tallinn	Arlet Levandi	Jegor Martšenko	Vladimir Taganov	
2022	Tallinn	Mihhail Selevko	Arlet Levandi	Jegor Martšenko	
2023	Tallinn	Arlet Levandi	Jegor Martšenko	No other competitors	
2024	Tartu	Arlet Levandi	Jegor Martšenko	Vladislav Churakov	
2025	Tallinn	Arlet Levandi	Vladislav Churakov	Jegor Martšenko	
2026	Tallinn	Ilya Nesterov	No other competitors		

=== Women's singles ===
Junior women's event medalists
Year	Location	Gold	Silver	Bronze	Ref.
1996	Tallinn	Jekaterina Golovatenko	Maria Levitan	Aljona Jelina	
1997	Tallinn	Jekaterina Golovatenko	Liina-Grete Lilender	Anu Erlang	
1998	Tallinn	Jekaterina Golovatenko	Liina-Grete Lilender	Inga Lillemaa	
1999	Tallinn	Olesja Gretšuk	Inga Lillemaa	Jevgenia Serebrjan	
2000	Tallinn	Maria Levitan	Jelena Abolina	Jevgenia Serebrjan	
2001	Tallinn	Maria Levitan	Jevgenia Serebrjan	Olesja Gretšuk	
2002	Tallinn	Jelena Muhhina	Jelena Glebova	Oksana Jerjomenko	
2003	Tallinn	Jekaterina Frolova	Jelena Muhhina	Jelena Glebova	
2004	Tallinn	Jelena Glebova	Jelena Muhhina	Kristiina Daub	
2005	Tallinn	Jelena Glebova	Svetlana Issakova	Jelena Muhhina	
2006	Tallinn	Svetlana Issakova	Johanna Allik	Darja Ptitsõna	
2007	Tallinn	Jasmine Alexandra Costa	Karmen Piirsoo	Ksenja Bolshakova	
2008	Tartu	Jasmine Alexandra Costa	Karmen Piirsoo	Ksenja Bolshakova	
2009	Tartu	Natalia Zabiiako	Ksenja Bolshakova	Helery Hälvin	
2010	Tallinn	Svetlana Issakova	Johanna Allik	Jasmine Alexandra Costa	
2011	Tallinn	Gerli Liinamäe	Svetlana Issakova	Jasmine Alexandra Costa	
2012	Tallinn	Sindra Kriisa	Eike Langerbaur	Natalja Gordeeva	
2013	Tartu	Gerli Liinamäe	Sindra Kriisa	Eike Langerbaur	
2014	Tallinn	Gerli Liinamäe	Eike Langerbaur	Diana Reinsalu	
2015	Tallinn	Natalja Gordeeva	Jelizaveta Leonova	Kristina Škuleta-Gromova	
2016	Tallinn	Kristina Škuleta-Gromova	Jelizaveta Leonova	Calista Krass	
2017	Tallinn	Kristina Škuleta-Gromova	Calista Krass	Annely Vahi	
2018	Tallinn	Kristina Škuleta-Gromova	Eva-Lotta Kiibus	Niina Petrõkina	
2019	Tallinn	Eva-Lotta Kiibus	Niina Petrõkina	Kristina Škuleta-Gromova	
2020	Tallinn	Niina Petrõkina	Nataly Langerbaur	Jekaterina Rudneva	
2021	Tallinn	Amalia Zelenjak	Niina Petrõkina	Nataly Langerbaur	
2022	Tallinn	Niina Petrõkina	Maria Eliise Kaljuvere	Marianne Must	
2023	Tallinn	Niina Petrõkina	Maria Eliise Kaljuvere	Nataly Langerbaur	
2024	Tartu	Elina Goidina	Maria Eliise Kaljuvere	Elizabeth Nõu	
2025	Tallinn	Elina Goidina	Maria Eliise Kaljuvere	Elizabeth Nõu	
2026	Tallinn	Maria Eliise Kaljuvere	Elina Goidina	Sofia Nekrassova	

=== Pairs ===
Junior pairs' event medalists
Year	Location	Gold	Silver	Bronze	Ref.
1996	Tallinn	No junior pairs competitors			
1997	Tallinn	Jekterina Nekrassova; Valdis Mintals	No other competitors		
1998	Tallinn	No junior pairs competitors			
1999	Tallinn	Viktoria Šklover; Valdis Mintals	No other competitors		
2000–02	Tallinn	No junior pairs competitors			
2003	Tallinn	Diana Rennik; Aleksei Saks	No other competitors		
2004	Tallinn	No junior pairs competitors			
2005	Tallinn	Maria Sergejeva; Ilja Glebov	No other competitors		
2006	Tallinn	Maria Sergejeva; Ilja Glebov	No other competitors		
2007–09	No junior pairs competitors				
2010	Tallinn	Natalya Zabiyako; Sergei Muhhin	No other competitors		
No junior pairs competitors since 2010

=== Ice dance ===
Junior ice dance event medalists
Year	Location	Gold	Silver	Bronze	Ref.
1996	Tallinn	Kristina Kolesnik; Aleksandr Terentjev	Natalia Mintals; Evgeni Striganov	Sille Laidma; Roland Ratas	
1997	Tallinn	Marina Timofeieva; Evgeni Striganov	Sille Laidma; Roland Ratas	Grethe Grünberg; Kristjan Rand	
1998	Tallinn	Marina Timofeieva; Evgeni Striganov	Seile Laidma; Aleksandr Kulits	Jelena Abolina; Mark Vorp	
1999	Tallinn	Anna Adaskevitš; Evgeni Striganov	No other competitors		
2000	Tallinn	Marina Timofeieva; Evgeni Striganov	No other competitors		
2001	Tallinn	Marina Timofeieva; Evgeni Striganov	Jelena Abolina; Aleksandr Škirin	No other competitors	
2002	Tallinn	Marina Timofeieva; Evgeni Striganov	Jelena Abolina; Aleksandr Škirin	Silja Laidma; Pjotr Golovatenko	
2003	Tallinn	Marina Timofeieva; Evgeni Striganov	Grethe Grünberg; Kristjan Rand	Julia Abolina; Aleksandr Škirin	
2004	Tallinn	Grethe Grünberg; Kristjan Rand	Julia Abolina; Aleksandr Škirin	Aleksandra Baurina; Juri Kurakin	
2005	Tallinn	Grethe Grünberg; Kristjan Rand	Aleksandra Baurina; Juri Kurakin	Kristina Kiudmaa; Konstantin Jevgenjev	
2006	Tallinn	Irina Štork; Taavi Rand	Kristina Kiudmaa; Konstantin Jevgenjev	Anastasija Tsumak; Aleksei Trohlev	
2007	Tallinn	Irina Štork; Taavi Rand	Kristina Kiudmaa; Aleksei Trohlev	No other competitors	
2008	Tartu	Irina Štork; Taavi Rand	Kristina Kiudmaa; Aleksei Trohlev	No other competitors	
2009	Tartu	Emili Arm; Rodion Bogdanov	Ainiki Niinelaid; Geido Kapp	No other competitors	
2010	Tallinn	Ainiki Niinelaid; Geido Kapp	No other competitors		
2011	Tallinn	Irina Štork; Taavi Rand	Victoria-Laura Lõhmus; Andrei Davõdov	Heidi Rand; Anton Sambalov	
2012	Tallinn	Johanna Allik; Paul Bellantuono	Victoria-Laura Lõhmus; Andrei Davõdov	No other competitors	
2013	Tartu	Johanna Allik; Paul Bellantuono	Marina Elias; Denis Koreline	No other competitors	
2014	Tallinn	Marina Elias; Denis Koreline	Ksenia Ševtšenko; German Frolov	No other competitors	
2015	Tallinn	Marina Elias; Denis Koreline	Viktoria Semenjuk; Artur Gruzdev	Merily Keskkula; German Frolov	
2016	Tallinn	Viktoria Semenjuk; Artur Gruzdev	Katerina Bunina; German Frolov	No other competitors	
2017	Tallinn	Viktoria Semenjuk; Artur Gruzdev	Gioia Pucci; Kevin Ojala	No other competitors	
2018	Tallinn	Viktoria Semenjuk; Artur Gruzdev	Gioia Pucci; Kevin Ojala	No other competitors	
2019	Tallinn	Viktoria Semenjuk; Artur Gruzdev	Darja Netjaga; Marko Jevgeni Gaidajenko	No other competitors	
2020	Tallinn	Darja Netjaga; Marko Jevgeni Gaidajenko	Tatjana Bunina; Ivan Kuznetsov	No other competitors	
2021	Tallinn	Tatjana Bunina; Ivan Kuznetsov	Solène Mazingue; Marko Jevgeni Gaidajenko	Aleksandra Samersova; Kevin Ojala	
2022	Tallinn	Tatjana Bunina; Ivan Kuznetsov	Isabella Suhhovskaja; Trevor Sebastian Malkasaari	No other competitors	
2023	Tallinn	No junior ice dance competitors			
2024	Tartu	Ksenia Šipunova; Miron Korjagin	No other competitors		
2025	Tallinn	Ksenia Šipunova; Miron Korjagin	Arina Beljajva; Frederick Merilo	No other competitors	
2026	Tallinn	Ksenia Šipunova; Miron Korjagin	No other competitors		

== Records ==
Records
Discipline	Most championship titles			
Discipline	Skater(s)	No.	Years	Ref.
Men's singles	Alfred Hirv	10	1929–35; 1937–38; 1940	
Women's singles	Vaike Paduri (née Kaljuvee)	14	1930–34; 1936–38; 1940; 1947–48; 1950–52	
Pairs	Eduard Hiiop (Note: Eduard Hiiop won two championship titles while partnered with Hilda Laane-Leonova (1923–24), one with Helmi Kaarik (1928), and seven with Helene Michelson (1929–31, 1933–36).)	10	1923–24; 1928–31; 1933–36	
Ice dance	Nikolai Salnikov (Note: Nikolai Salnikov won four championship titles while partnered with Natalia Tokareva (1971–74), and four with Tamara Prokopjuk (1975–78).)	8	1971–78	
