= Elina Goidina =

Estonian figure skater (born 2010)

Personal information
- Born: 3 May 2010 (age 16) Tallinn, Estonia
- Height: 157 cm (5 ft 2 in)

Figure skating career
- Country: Estonia
- Coach: Alexei Mishin; Andrei Lutai
- Skating club: Olympic Figure Skating Club
- Began skating: 2014
Medal record
Estonian Championships
Gold medal – first place	2024 Tallinn	Singles
Silver medal – second place	2025 Tallinn	Singles

Elina Goidina (born 3 May 2010) is an Estonian figure skater. She is the 2024 Estonian national champion, as well as the 2025 national silver medalist. On the junior level, she is a two-time national champion (2024, 2025) and the 2024 JGP Latvia silver medalist. She is also a three-time Black Sea Ice Cup champion (2024–2026).

== Personal life ==
Goidina was born in Tallinn, Estonia on 3 May 2010 and started skating in 2014, at the age of four. She aspires to become a coach after her figure skating career.

== Career ==
=== Early career ===
On the advanced novice level, she is the 2022 Estonian national champion. Internationally, she notably won the 2022 Kurbada Cup as well as the 2023 Maria Olszewska Memorial.

=== 2023–2024 season ===
Goidina debuted internationally as a junior at the 2023 Bosphorus Cup where she placed 4th overall. A month later, she competed at the 2024 Estonian Championships on the senior level where she won the gold medal, making this her first national title. She later won the gold medal on the national junior level.

Elina made her Junior World debut at the 2024 Junior World Championships. Despite finishing 5th after the short program, she finished 17th in the free skate; finishing in 11th place overall.

=== 2024–2025 season ===
Elina opened her season by winning the silver medal at the 2024 JGP Latvia behind Mao Shimada. She achieved a new personal best score of 182.23 total points. She later finished 6th place at her second Grand Prix assignment in Slovenia.

In December she competed at the 2025 Estonian Championships. She won gold on the junior level and silver on the senior level.

At the 2025 World Junior Championships, Goidina achieved a new personal best short program score of 64.15 points – she finished the competition in 7th place overall.

=== 2025–2026 season ===
Goidina began her season by finishing 4th at the 2025 JGP in Latvia, as well as 6th in Italy. In January, she won the 2026 Volvo Cup.

Before the 2026 Estonian national championships, it was announced by the Estonian Skating Union that age in-eligible skaters would not be allowed to compete at the senior championships, complying with the official ISU age eligibility rules. Thus, preventing Elina to compete on the senior level despite winning two national medals previously. Elina expressed her disappointment on the rule change, "As a result, I won’t be able to take part in the championship this year. I’m truly sorry to find out about this only now, because I’ve been preparing for these competitions with the same dedication and seriousness as for any other important events this season...leading figure skating countries such as Japan, Korea, and the USA allow juniors to compete in senior national championships – despite the ISU’s age limit of 17 for moving up to seniors. This is done to develop the overall level of figure skating, to help juniors grow stronger, and to keep senior skaters in good shape. I believe Amber Glenn and Kaori Sakamoto are not afraid of competition with junior skaters. And judges in those countries have no problem evaluating athletes of different ages. Why can’t our Federation continue to follow their example?" Following the federations decision, Elina competed at the 2026 Junior national championships where she placed 2nd overall.

In February 2026, it was announced via Elina's skater profile that she made a coaching change from Sergei Rozanov and Irina Konova to Alexei Mishin and Andrei Lutai.

The 2026 Junior World Championships in March were held in Goidina's home country and city, Tallinn, Estonia. In the short program segment she faced difficulties, leaving her in 20th place. In the free skate, she thoroughly improved placing 7th in that segment with a new personal best score. She finished the event in 14th overall.

=== 2026–2027 season ===
During the off season Goidina had experienced growing pains which affected her jumps. She opened her competitive season at the Junior Grand Prix in Georgia; placing twelfth.

== Programs ==
Season	Short program	Free skating
2026–2027	Dios es un stalker AI version choreo by. Benoît Richaud	Dracula: A Love Tale; I Can do Everything by Christopher Lennertz; Music Box by Danny Elfman; The Dance by Danny Elfman; Victoriam Speramus by Krypteria choreo by. Sergei Komolov
2025–2026	New Day Will Rise; by Yuval Raphael choreo by. Sergei Komolov, Elvira Goidina	503 (from "Angels and Demons" soundtrack); 160 BPM (from "Angels and Demons" soundtrack); by Hans Zimmer choreo by. Sergei Komolov, Elvira Goidina
2024–2025	Kill the Target (Theme From KT); by Hotei: The Diva Dance (The Fifth Element); by Eric Serra choreo by. Sergei Komolov, Elvira Goidina	503 (from "Angels and Demons" soundtrack); 160 BPM (from "Angels and Demons" soundtrack); by Hans Zimmer choreo by. Sergei Komolov, Elvira Goidina
2023–2024	Strange Birds; by Birdy choreo by. Sergei Komolov, Elvira Goidina	Schindlers List (soundtrack); by John Williams

== Competitive highlights ==
- JGP – Event of the ISU Grand Prix Series
- TBD – Assigned

Competition placements at senior level
Season	2021–22	2022–23	2023–24	2024–25
Estonian Championships	6th	6th	1st	2nd

Competition placements at junior level
Season	2022–23	2023–24	2024–25	2025–26	2026–27
World Junior Championships		11th	7th	14th	
Estonian Championships	4th	1st	1st	2nd	
JGP Georgia					12th
JGP Italy				6th	
JGP Latvia			2nd	4th	
JGP Poland					TBD
JGP Slovenia			6th		
European Youth Olympic Festival			2nd		
Black Sea Ice Cup		1st	1st	1st	
Bosphorus Cup	4th				
Denkova-Staviski Cup			1st		
Ephesus Cup		1st	1st		
Jelgava Cup			1st		1st
Lõunakeskus Trophy		1st	1st		3rd
Skate Berlin				2nd	
Skate Helena	4th				
Tallinn Open					2nd
Tallinn Trophy				4th	
Trophée Métropole Nice Côte d'Azur				1st	
Volvo Open Cup			1st	1st	

== Detailed results ==
ISU personal best scores in the +5/-5 GOE System
Segment	Type	Score	Event
Total	TSS	182.23	2024 JGP Latvia
Short program	TSS	64.15	2025 World Junior Championships
Short program	TES	37.12	2025 JGP Latvia
Short program	PCS	27.78	2026 World Junior Championships
Free skating	TSS	121.32	2026 World Junior Championships
Free skating	TES	65.33	2024 JGP Latvia
Free skating	PCS	56.74	2025 World Junior Championships
