= Jekaterina Nekrassova =

Estonian retired pair skater (born 1981)

Personal information
- Full name: Jekaterina Nekrassova
- Other names: Ekaterina Nekrassova
- Born: 21 June 1981 (age 45)
- Home town: Tallinn, Estonia

Figure skating career
- Country: Estonia
- Partner: Valdis Mintals (1995–98)
- Retired: 1998

Jekaterina Nekrassova (born June 21, 1981) is a retired Estonian pair skater. With partner Valdis Mintals, she is a two-time Estonian national champion.

== Biography ==
Nekrassova was born on 21 June 1981. She began competing as a pair skater in 1995 after teaming up with Valdis Mintals. In addition to winning two national titles at the Estonian Championships, the pair also competed at multiple World Figure Skating Championships, the European Figure Skating Championships, and the World Junior Figure Skating Championships before their partnership ended in 1998.

Nekrassova retired that same year and went on to finish high school and studied to be an English translator in college. In 1999, Nekrassova began working as a coach at Anna Levandi Figure Skating Club in Tallinn.

In 2010, she married Tallinn Polytechnic University alumni, Vitali, who adopted Nekrassova's last name upon marrying. The couple have two children. Their daughter, Sofia, is a competitive women's singles skater.

As a coach, Nekrassova's students have included:

- Vladislav Churakov
- Arlet Levandi
- Sofia Nekrassova
- Ilya Nesterov
- Jekaterina Rudneva
- Maria Sergejeva / Ilja Glebov
- Natalia Zabiiako / Sergei Mukhin

In addition, she is fluent in Estonian, English, Russian, and German.

== Results ==
(with Mintals)

Results
International
| Event | 1995–1996 | 1996–1997 | 1997–1998 |
|---|---|---|---|
| World Championships | 22nd | 20th | 23rd |
| European Championships | 17th | 15th | 13th |
| Intern. St. Gervais | | 9th | |
| Karl Schäfer Memorial | | 7th | |
| Nebelhorn Trophy | | 8th | |
International: Junior
| Junior Worlds | | 18th | 14th |
| Blue Swords | | 14th | |
National
| Estonian Championships | 1st | 1st | |
