= Piir =

Piir may refer to:

- Uno Piir (1929–2025), Estonian football coach and player
- Ly Piir (1930–2020), Estonian figure skater and coach
- Power in international relations
