= Anna Mosenkova =

Estonian ice dancer

Personal information
- Born: 13 June 1973 (age 53) Tallinn, then part of Estonian SSR, Soviet Union
- Height: 170 cm (5.6 ft)

Figure skating career
- Country: Estonia
- Skating club: FSC Medal Tallinn
- Retired: 2002

Anna Mosenkova (born 13 June 1973) is an Estonian ice dancer. With partner Sergei Sychyov, she is the 2000-2002 Estonian national champion and competed at the World Figure Skating Championships and European Figure Skating Championships, with a highest placement of 21st at the 2000 European Figure Skating Championships. They also competed on the ISU Grand Prix of Figure Skating. They were coached by Lea Rand, the mother of Estonian ice dancers Kristian and Taavi Rand.

Before teaming up with Sychyov, Mosenkova competed with Dmitri Kurakin, with whom she medaled at nationals and competed at Worlds, Europeans, and the World Junior Figure Skating Championships.
