= Evgeni Striganov =

Estonian ice dancer

Personal information
- Born: 23 March 1982 (age 44)
- Height: 1.84 m (6 ft 1/2 in)

Figure skating career
- Country: Estonia
- Skating club: FSC Jääklid Tallinn
- Retired: 2004

Evgeni Striganov (born 23 March 1982 in Tallinn) is an Estonian ice dancer. With partner Marina Timofejeva, he is the 2003 & 2004 Estonian national champion. They were five time competitors at the World Junior Figure Skating Championships, with the highest placement of 17th in 2003. They placed 22nd at the 2003 European Figure Skating Championships and 26th at the 2003 World Figure Skating Championships. They were coached by Lea Rand, the mother of fellow Estonian ice dancers Kristjan and Taavi Rand.
