= Artur Gruzdev =

Estonian ice dancer (born 1998)

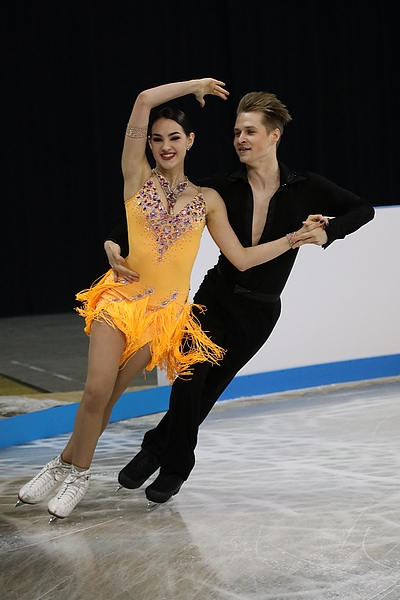
- Viktoria Semenjuk and Artur Gruzdev at the 2018 World Junior Championships

Personal information
- Born: 15 December 1998 (age 27) Tallinn, Estonia
- Home town: Yerevan, Armenia
- Height: 1.80 m (5 ft 11 in)

Figure skating career
- Country: Armenia (since 2022); Estonia (2014–20)
- Discipline: Ice dance
- Partner: Viktoriia Azroian (since 2022); Katerina Bunina (2019–20); Viktoria Semenjuk (2014–19)
- Coach: Vazgen Azroian
- Began skating: 2002
Representing Estonia
Estonian Championships
Gold medal – first place	2018 Tallinn	Ice dance

Artur Gruzdev (born 15 December 1998) is an Estonian ice dancer. With his former skating partner, Viktoria Semenjuk, he has competed in the final segment at two World Junior Championships (2018, 2019). They placed tenth at the 2016 Winter Youth Olympics.

== Programs ==
=== With Bunina ===
Season	Rhythm dance	Free dance
2019–2020	Foxtrot: How 'Bout a Dance?; Quickstep: This World Will Remember Us (from Bonnie & Clyde) by Frank Wildhorn choreo. by Lea Rand	Crazy in Love (from Fifty Shades of Grey) by Beyoncé; Meant by Elizaveta choreo. by Lea Rand

=== With Semenjuk ===
Season	Rhythm dance	Free dance
2018–2019	Tango: Adiós Nonino by Astor Piazzolla choreo. by Lea Rand	Ghost the Musical by David A. Stewart, Glen Ballard choreo. by Lea Rand
	Short dance	
2017–2018	Cha-cha: I Like It Like That; Rhumba: Addicted to You performed by Avicii; Samba: Ooh la la by Chicadee choreo. by Lea Rand	Goliyon Ki Raasleela Ram-Leela; Nagada Sang Dhol; Dhoop; Tattad Tattad choreo. by Lea Rand
2016–2017	Swing: Bei Mir Bistu Shein by Sholom Secunda; Blues; Swing: Bei Mir Bistu Shein by Sholom Secunda choreo. by Elena Kustarova, Irina Štork, Taavi Rand	María; Perdóname; La Copa de la Vida by Ricky Martin choreo. by Elena Kustarova, Irina Štork, Taavi Rand
2015–2016	Waltz: Waltz in G flat by Young Mozart; March: We Will Rock You by Queen choreo. by Lea Rand	Still Loving You; Rock You Like a Hurricane by the Scorpions choreo. by Lea Rand
2014–2015	Samba: Chillando Goma by Fulanito; Rhumba: Les feuilles mortes by Andrea Bocelli; Samba: Samba de Janeiro by Bellini choreo. by Lea Rand	Played-A-Live (The Bongo Song) by Safri Duo; Run the Show by Kat DeLuna, Busta Rhymes choreo. by Lea Rand

== Competitive highlights ==
- GP – Event of the ISU Grand Prix Series
- JGP – Event of the ISU Junior Grand Prix Series
- CS – Event of the ISU Challenger Series
- WD – Withdrew from competition

=== Ice dance with Viktoriia Azroian (for Armenia) ===
Competition placements at senior level
Season	2022–23	2023–24	2024–25
European Championships	23rd		
CS Budapest Trophy			15th
CS Denis Ten Memorial	8th	WD	
CS Golden Spin of Zagreb	12th		
CS Trophée Métropole Nice			17th
Challenge Cup		8th	
Ephesus Cup		WD	
Santa Claus Cup	8th		
World University Games	13th		

=== Ice dance with Katerina Bunina (for Estonia) ===
Competition placements at junior level
Season	2019–20
JGP Croatia	12th
JGP Poland	5th

=== Ice dance with Viktoria Semenjuk (for Estonia) ===
Competition placements at senior level
Season	2017–18
Estonian Championships	1st
CS Lombardia Trophy	13th
CS Nebelhorn Trophy	16th

Competition placements at junior level
Season	2014–15	2015–16	2016–17	2017–18	2018–19
Winter Youth Olympics		10th			
World Junior Championships		25th	21st	20th	16th
Estonian Championships	2nd	1st		1st	1st
JGP Armenia					10th
JGP Croatia		14th			
JGP Czech Republic					13th
JGP Estonia	13th		9th		
JGP Germany	14th				
JGP Poland		13th			
JGP Russia			8th		
Ice Star	20th				
Tallinn Trophy	6th	8th	5th	7th	4th
Volvo Open Cup	17th				8th

== Detailed results ==
Results in the 2024–25 season
Date	Event	RD		FD		Total	
Date	Event	P	Score	P	Score	P	Score
Oct 11–13, 2024	(Hungary) 2024 CS Budapest Trophy	16	52.17	17	81.41	15	133.58
Oct 16–20, 2024	(France) 2024 CS Trophée Métropole Nice Côte d'Azur	17	47.21	16	75.95	17	123.16
