= Sergei Sõtšov =

Ukrainian ice dancer

Sergei Sychyov
Personal information
- Born: February 6, 1977 (age 49)
- Height: 1.85 m (6 ft 1 in)

Figure skating career
- Country: Estonia; Ukraine
- Skating club: FSC Medal Tallinn
- Retired: 2002

Sergei Sychyov (born February 6, 1977, in Odesa) is a Ukrainian ice dancer who also competed internationally for Estonia. He competed internationally for Ukraine on the junior level with Julia Shevchenko. He teamed up with Anna Mosenkova in 1999 to compete for Estonia.

With Mosenkova, he is the 2000-2002 Estonian national champion and competed at the World Figure Skating Championships and European Figure Skating Championships, with a highest placement of 21st at the 2000 European Figure Skating Championships. They also competed on the ISU Grand Prix of Figure Skating. They were coached by Lea Rand, the mother of Estonian ice dancers Kristjan and Taavi Rand.
