= Ly Piir =

Estonian figure skater and coach (1930–2020)

Ly Piir (until 1951 Rooba; 9 February 1930 – 8 January 2020) was an Estonian figure skater and coach.

She was born in Tallinn. In 1960 Tallinn Pedagogical Institute's Faculty of Physical Education.

She began her skating career in 1944, coached by Vaike Paduri. She is multiple-times Estonian champion in different figure skating disciplines.

She started her coaching career in 1954. Students: Tiina Gross, Peeter Laur, Anne Šaraškin, Nikolai Salnikov, Natalia Tokareva.

She was a member of the board of Estonian Skating Union.
