= Eduard Kõppo =

Estonian sport personnel and military personnel

Personal information
- Born: May 30, 1894 Paide, Governorate of Estonia, Russian Empire
- Died: November 6, 1966 (aged 72)

Sport
- Sport: Figure skating Bandy; Swimming; Rowing

Eduard Kõppo (also Kepp; 30 May 1894 – 6 November 1966) was an Estonian sports figure.

He was born in Paide.

In 1918 he won Estonian Figure Skating Championships in men's singles. He won championships also in bandy, relay swimming and rowing.

In 1940s he was acting chairman of Estonian Sports Association Kalev, and in 1944 its chairman.

He participated on Estonian War of Independence, belonging to military unit called Kalevlaste Maleva.

== Awards ==
- 1929: Order of the Cross of the Eagle, V class
- 1938: Order of the White Star, V class
