= Liina-Grete Lilender =

Estonian figure skater

Personal information
- Born: 14 October 1979 (age 46)
- Height: 1.65 m (5 ft 5 in)

Figure skating career
- Country: Estonia
- Skating club: Figure Skating Club Tallinn

Liina-Grete Lilender (born 14 October 1979 in Tallinn) is an Estonian figure skater. She is the 1997 Estonian national champion and a multiple silver- and bronze-medalist at that competition. She placed 21st in the qualifying round at the 1997 World Figure Skating Championships. As a university student, she placed 22nd at the 2003 Winter Universiade and 32nd at the 2005 Winter Universiade.

She currently works as a coach at the Tallinn figure skating club
