= Alexei Kozlov (figure skater) =

Estonian figure skater

Personal information
- Born: 8 June 1979 (age 47) Tallinn, then part of Estonian SSR, Soviet Union
- Height: 1.84 m (6 ft 0 in)

Figure skating career
- Country: Estonia
- Skating club: FSC Jäätäht
- Retired: 2004

Alexei Kozlov (born 8 June 1979, in Tallinn) is an Estonian former competitive figure skater. He is the 1997 Ondrej Nepela Memorial silver medalist, the 1998 Piruetten bronze medalist, and a three-time (2001, 2003 & 2004) Estonian national champion. He reached the free skate at two ISU Championship, finishing 14th at the 1998 Junior Worlds in Saint John, New Brunswick, Canada, and 18th at the 2001 Europeans in Bratislava, Slovakia.

== Programs ==
Season	Short program	Free skating
2002–03	Tanguera by Mariano Mores	Malaguena by Ernesto Lecuona, 101 Strings Orchestra
2001–02	Tanguera by Mariano Mores	Polovtsian Dances (from Prince Igor) by Alexander Borodin, Symphony Orchestra of the State of Mexico
2000–01	Toccata and Fugue in D Minor by Johann Sebastian Bach performed by Vanessa-Mae	Polovtsian Dances (from Prince Igor) by Alexander Borodin, Symphony Orchestra of the State of Mexico

== Results ==
International
Event	90–91	93-94	95-96	96–97	97–98	98–99	99–00	00–01	01–02	02–03	03–04
Worlds								31st			
Europeans								18th		25th	
Crystal Skate							1st				
Nebelhorn Trophy				16th					11th		
Nepela Memorial					2nd						
Piruetten						3rd					
Schäfer Memorial					16th						
International: Junior
Junior Worlds					14th						
National
Estonian Champ.	1st	3rd	3rd	3rd	2nd	3rd	2nd	1st	2nd	1st	1st
