= Svetlana Issakova =

Estonian figure skater (born 1993)

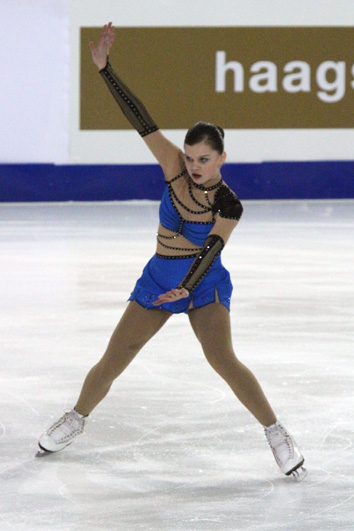
- Issakova in 2010

Personal information
- Born: 14 June 1993 (age 33) Tallinn, Estonia
- Height: 1.64 m (5 ft 5 in)

Figure skating career
- Country: Estonia
- Skating club: Tallinn Figure Skating School
- Began skating: 1999
- Retired: 2014

Svetlana Issakova (born 14 June 1993) is an Estonian former competitive figure skater. She is the 2008 Estonian national champion and won three medals on the ISU Junior Grand Prix series. She competed at three World Junior Championships —achieving her best result, 12th, in 2010— and the 2011 European Championships, where she finished 18th.

== Programs ==
Season	Short program	Free skating
2011–12	Fantasie by Frédéric Chopin	The Master and Margarita by Igor Kornelyuk; Waltz; Love Theme
2010–11	Concerto for Violin and Orchestra in E minor op 64 by Felix Mendelssohn	Pearl Harbor by Hans Zimmer
2008–09	Bolero	Polonaise Op. 35; Polonaise for Piano No. 6 "Heroique" by Frederic Chopin
2007–08	Don Quixote by Ludwig Minkus	Rhapsody on a Theme of Paganini by Sergei Rachmaninoff
2006–07	Don Quixote by Ludwig Minkus	Prelude Op. 23 No. 5 in G minor by Sergei Rachmaninoff

== Competitive highlights ==
JGP: Junior Grand Prix

International
Event	04–05	05–06	06–07	07–08	08–09	09–10	10–11	11–12	12–13	13–14
Europeans							18th			
Ice Challenge						23rd	10th			
Ice Star										3rd
Schäfer Memorial					13th					
Volvo Open Cup									4th	
Warsaw Cup									10th	
International: Junior
Junior Worlds				26th	15th	12th				
JGP Final				7th						
JGP Austria								14th		
JGP Belarus					13th					
JGP Czech Rep.			2nd							
JGP Estonia				3rd				14th		
JGP Germany						11th				
JGP Hungary						16th				
JGP Italy					16th					
JGP Norway			6th							
JGP Romania							19th			
JGP U.K.				2nd						
National
Estonian			2nd	1st	4th	3rd	2nd	3rd	2nd	
Estonian Jr.	2nd	1st	1st	1st	1st	1st	2nd	3rd		
WD: Withdrew
