= Roman Martõnenko =

Estonian figure skater

Personal information
- Other names: Martynenko
- Born: 1977 (age 48–49) Tallinn, then part of Estonian SSR, Soviet Union

Figure skating career
- Country: Estonia
- Retired: 2001

Roman Martõnenko (born in 1977 in Tallinn) is an Estonian former competitive figure skater. He is a three-time Estonian national champion and reached the free skate at three ISU Championships – 1993 Junior Worlds in Seoul, 1997 Europeans in Paris, and 1997 Junior Worlds in Seoul.

After retiring from competition, Martõnenko performed with the Russian Ice Stars. As of 2016, he is a coach at Asker kunstløpklubb in Asker, Norway.

== Competitive highlights ==
International
| Event | 88–89 | 89–90 | 90–91 | 91–92 | 92–93 | 93–94 | 94–95 | 95–96 | 96–97 | 97–98 | 98–99 | 99–00 | 00–01 |
|---|---|---|---|---|---|---|---|---|---|---|---|---|---|
| Worlds | | | | | 27th | | | | | | | | |
| Europeans | | | | | | | 28th | | 22nd | | | | |
| Finlandia | | | | | | | | | | 16th | | | |
| Nebelhorn | | | | | | | | | | | 18th | | |
| Nepela | | | | | | | | | | | 12th | 10th | 22nd |
International: Junior
| Junior Worlds | | | | | 22nd | | | 26th | 17th | | | | |
National
| Estonian | 3rd | 1st | 2nd | 1st | 1st | 2nd | 2nd | 2nd | 2nd | 3rd | 2nd | 3rd | |
| Estonian Jr. | 1st | | 1st | | | 2nd | 1st | | | | | | |
