= Viktor Romanenkov =

Estonian figure skater

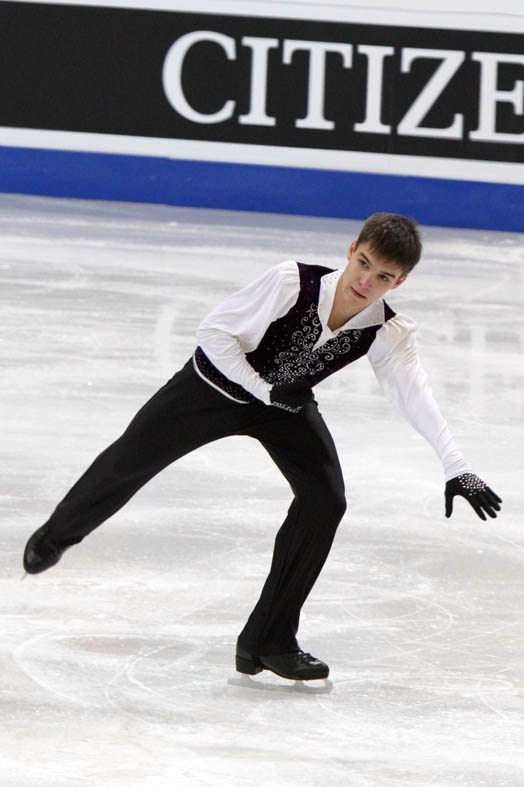
- Viktor Romanenkov at the 2011 European Championships

Personal information
- Born: 29 September 1993 (age 32) Tallinn, Estonia
- Height: 1.81 m (5 ft 11 in)

Figure skating career
- Country: Estonia
- Discipline: Men's singles
- Began skating: 1999

Medal record
Estonian Championships
Gold medal – first place	2008 Tartu	Singles
Gold medal – first place	2009 Tartu	Singles
Gold medal – first place	2010 Tallinn	Singles
Gold medal – first place	2011 Narva	Singles
Gold medal – first place	2012 Tallinn	Singles
Gold medal – first place	2013 Tallinn	Singles
Gold medal – first place	2014 Tallinn	Singles

Viktor Romanenkov (born 29 September 1993 in Tallinn) is an Estonian figure skater. He is the 2008–14 Estonian national champion and competed at the 2014 Winter Olympics. He then signed a six-month contract to perform on a cruise ship. He is the son of Oksana Romanenkova (née Hutornaja), a figure skating coach and a five-time Estonian national ladies' champion.

== Programs ==
Season	Short program	Free skating
2013–2014	Notre-Dame de Paris by Riccardo Cocciante	Carmen by Georges Bizet
2012–2013	Tango Amore by Edvin Marton	The Prince of Egypt by Hans Zimmer
2011–2012	Caprice No. 24 in A minor by Niccolò Paganini	Notre Dame de Paris (soundtrack)
2010–2011	Dancing Club Loyko	Notre Dame de Paris (soundtrack)
2009–2010	Flamenco	Trouble Man by Marvin Gaye
2008–2009	El Mareo by Bajofondo	Romeo and Juliet performed by Edvin Marton
2007–2008	Mariage D'Amour by Richard Clayderman	Carmen by Georges Bizet

== Competitive highlights ==
JGP: Junior Grand Prix

International
Event	2006–07	2007–08	2008–09	2009–10	2010–11	2011–12	2012–13	2013–14
Olympics								24th
Worlds				36th			22nd	26th
Europeans				29th	WD	23rd	17th	24th
Finlandia								9th
Ice Challenge							6th	
Lombardia								10th
Nebelhorn				16th				
NRW Trophy					18th			
Volvo Open							8th	9th
Universiade								10th
International: Junior
Junior Worlds		26th	23rd		18th			
JGP Austria							10th	
JGP Belarus			9th					
JGP Croatia				11th				
JGP Estonia		18th				6th		
JGP Germany		16th			11th			
JGP Italy			14th					
JGP Latvia						9th		
JGP Poland				8th				
JGP Romania					8th			
JGP Slovenia							9th	
EYOF			1st J.					
National
Estonian	1st J.	1st	1st	1st	1st	1st	1st	1st
