= Jelena Muhhina =

Estonian figure skater (born 1988)

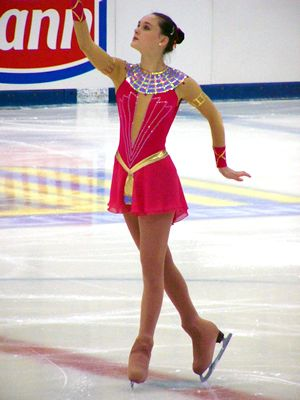
- Muhhina in 2004.

Personal information
- Born: 22 October 1988 (age 37) Tallinn, then part of Estonian SSR, Soviet Union
- Height: 1.73 m (5 ft 8 in)

Figure skating career
- Country: Estonia
- Coach: Irina Kononova
- Skating club: FSC Kristalluisk Tallinn
- Began skating: 1994
- Retired: 2008

Jelena Muhhina (born 22 October 1988) is an Estonian former competitive figure skater. She is the 2006 Estonian national champion and placed 21st in the qualifying round at the 2006 World Championships. After missing the 2008 Estonian Championships due to injury, she did not return to competition.

Muhhina is the elder sister of Sergei Muhhin, who also competed internationally in figure skating.

== Programs ==
Season	Short program	Free skating
2007–2008	Mission Impossible by Hans Zimmer	Dark Eyes

== Competitive highlights ==
JGP: Junior Grand Prix

International
Event	2001–02	2002–03	2003–04	2004–05	2005–06	2006–07	2007–08
World Champ.					21st QR		
Finlandia Trophy						9th	
Nepela Memorial					10th		
Cup of Nice						8th	
International: Junior
JGP Bulgaria							12th
JGP Czech Republic			20th				
JGP Estonia					16th		18th
JGP France						12th	
JGP Germany				11th			
JGP Hungary				21st			
JGP Slovakia		25th	15th		13th		
EYOF				10th			
National
Estonian Champ.	2nd J.	4th	4th	3rd	1st	3rd	
J. = Junior level; QR = Qualifying round
