= Oksana Romanenkova =

Estonian figure skater and coach

Personal information
- Other names: Oksana Hutornaja
- Born: 1 November 1970 (age 55) Tallinn, then part of Estonian SSR, Soviet Union
- Height: 1.65 m (5 ft 5 in)

Figure skating career
- Country: Estonia
- Retired: 1992

Oksana Romanenkova, née Hutornaja, (born 1 November 1970 in Tallinn) is an Estonian figure skating coach and former competitor. She is a five-time Estonian national champion in ladies' singles. She gave birth to her son, Viktor Romanenkov, on 29 September 1993 in Tallinn.
