= Sergei Muhhin =

Estonian figure skater

Personal information
- Born: 21 January 1990 (age 36) Tallinn, then part of Estonian SSR, Soviet Union
- Height: 1.79 m (5 ft 10 in)

Figure skating career
- Country: Estonia
- Partner: Sarah Santee
- Coach: Irina Kononova
- Skating club: FSC Kristalluisk

Sergei Muhhin (born 21 January 1990) is a former Estonian figure skater. As a single skater, he is the 2006 Estonian national champion. He switched to pair skating in 2009 and teamed up with Natalya Zabiyako. They are the 2010 Estonian champions.

He is the younger brother of Jelena Muhhina, who also competed in figure skating.

== Programs ==
=== With Zabiyako ===
| Season | Short program | Free skating |
|---|---|---|
| 2009–2010 | Charlie Chaplin | Dark Eyes |

=== Single skating ===
| Season | Short program | Free skating |
|---|---|---|
| 2007–2008 | Armageddon by Trevor Rabin | Pirates of the Caribbean by Klaus Badelt |
| 2006–2007 | Ouverture 1622 by Yngwie Malmsteen | Pirates of the Caribbean by Klaus Badelt |
| 2005–2006 | Gladiator by Hans Zimmer, Lisa Gerrard | Pirates of the Caribbean by Klaus Badelt |

== Competitive highlights ==
JGP: Junior Grand Prix

=== Pair skating with Zabiyako ===
International
| Event | 2009–10 |
|---|---|
| World Junior Championships | 16th |
| JGP Belarus | 13th |
National
| Estonian Championships | 1st |

=== Single skating ===
International
| Event | 2003–04 | 2004–05 | 2005–06 | 2006–07 | 2007–08 |
|---|---|---|---|---|---|
| World Junior Champ. | | | | 41st | |
| JGP Estonia | | | 20th | | 25th |
| JGP Czech Republic | | | | 21st | |
| JGP Poland | | | 23rd | | |
National
| Estonian Champ. | 5th | 2nd | 1st J. | 2nd J. | |
J. = Junior level
