= Diana Rennik =

Estonian pair skater

Personal information
- Born: 25 March 1985 (age 41) Yekaterinburg, Russian SFSR, Soviet Union
- Height: 1.60 m (5 ft 3 in)

Figure skating career
- Country: Estonia
- Partner: Aleksei Saks
- Coach: Ardo Rennik
- Skating club: FSC Medal Tallinn
- Retired: 2007

Diana Rennik (born 25 March 1985 in Ekaterinburg, Russia) is an Estonian former competitive pair skater. She competed with Aleksei Saks. Together, they are the four times Estonian national champions. They placed 17th at the 2006 Winter Olympics.

== Competitive highlights ==
(with Saks)

Event	2001–02	2002–03	2003–04	2004–05	2005–06	2006–07
Winter Olympic Games					17th	
World Championships		19th	18th	16th		22nd
European Championships	17th	13th	12th	11th	12th	14th
World Junior Championships	13th	15th				
Estonian Championships	2nd	1st	1st	1st	1st	2nd
Trophée Eric Bompard					10th	
Cup of China				9th		
Karl Schafer Memorial					9th	
Nebelhorn Trophy					10th	
Finlandia Trophy		7th				
