= Anne Šaraškin =

Estonian figure skater (1938–2025)

Anne Šaraškin

Anne Šaraškin (née Ronk; 19 January 1938 – 15 July 2025) was an Estonian figure skater and referee.

== Biography ==
Šaraškin was born in Pajusi Rural Municipality, Viljandi County on 19 January 1938. In 1961 she graduated from Tallinn Pedagogical Institute as a mathematics-physics teacher.

She began her figure skating career in 1952, coached by Benita Parri. Later her coach was Ly Piir. In 1963–1969, she won Estonian championships in pair ice dance, and in 1956 in single ice dance.

From 1975 to 2010 she was a member of the board of Estonian Skating Union. Šaraškin died on 15 July 2025, at the age of 87.
