= Jekaterina Golovatenko =

Estonian figure skater (born 1979)

Personal information
- Born: 15 October 1979 (age 47) Keila, then part of Estonian SSR, Soviet Union
- Height: 1.61 m (5 ft 3 1/2 in)

Figure skating career
- Country: Estonia
- Skating club: FSC Rataskaar
- Began skating: 1984
- Retired: 2001

Jekaterina Golovatenko (born 15 October 1979 in Keila) is an Estonian former competitive figure skater. She is a multiple medalist at the Estonian Championships. Her highest placement at an ISU championship was 21st at the 1998 European Championships.

== Programs ==
Season	Short program	Free skating
2001–02	Toss the Feathers	The Prince of Egypt by Hans Zimmer

== Competitive highlights ==
International
Event	93–94	94–95	95–96	96–97	97–98	98–99	99–00	00–01	01–02
Europeans			12th Q	28th	21st				
Finlandia Trophy							10th		
Schäfer Memorial					20th				
Nebelhorn Trophy				17th	14th	11th			23rd
Nepela Memorial					13th		4th	15th	
Universiade						15th		10th	
Tallinn Cup						4th	6th		
International: Junior
Junior Worlds		15th Q		18th Q		33rd			
JGP Ukraine						5th			
EYOF		5th		7th					
National
Estonian Champ.	2nd	1st	3rd	2nd	2nd	2nd	2nd	2nd	
Estonian Jr.	1st	1st	1st	1st	1st				
JGP = Junior Grand Prix; Q = Qualifying round
