= Nataly Langerbaur =

Estonian figure skater (born 2004)

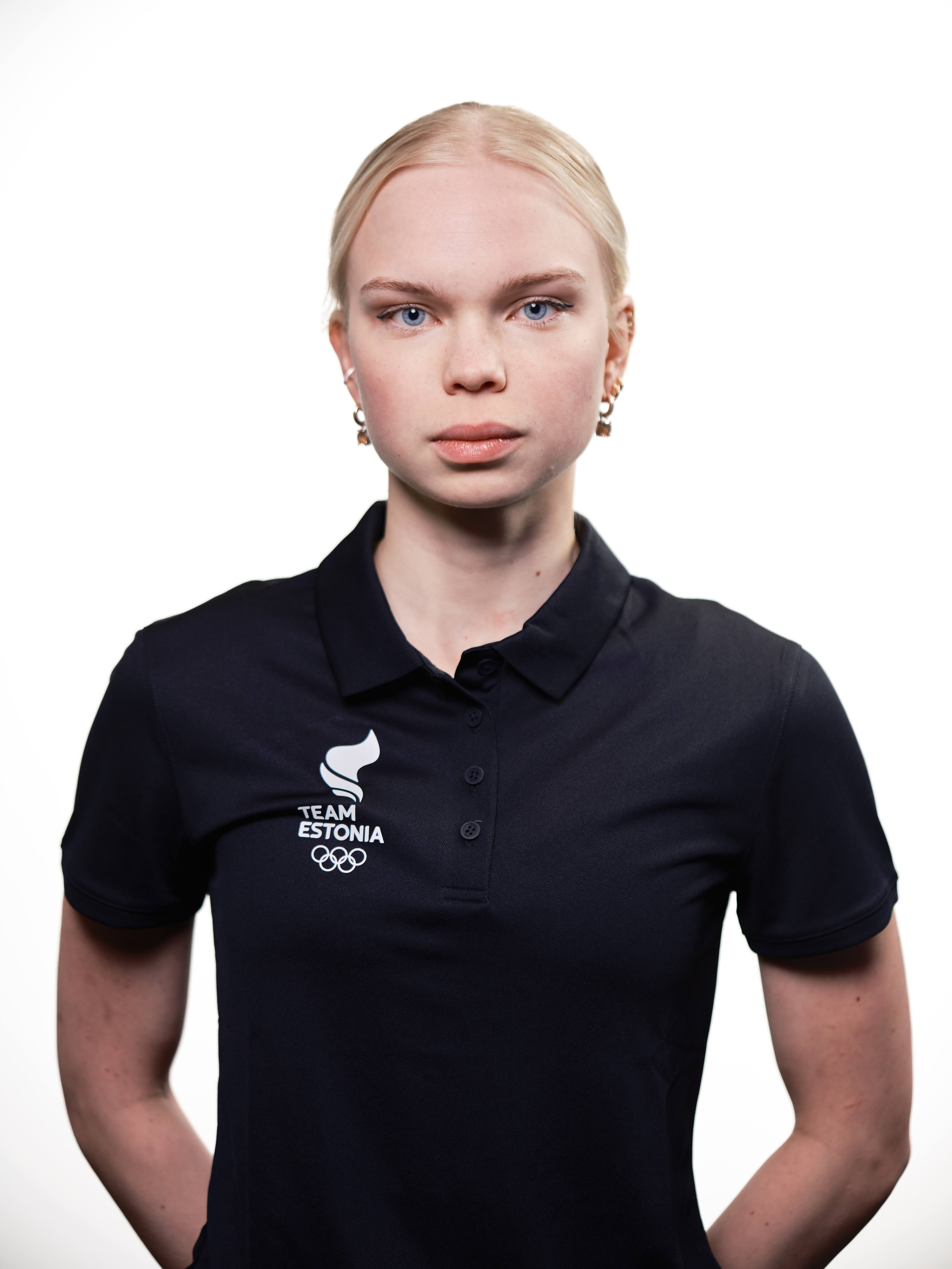
- Langerbaur in 2025

Personal information
- Born: 1 August 2004 (age 22) Tallinn, Estonia
- Height: 165 cm (5 ft 5 in)

Figure skating career
- Country: Estonia
- Coach: Irina Kononova; Katerina Kalenda
- Skating club: Kristalluisk
- Began skating: 2008

Medal record
Estonian Championships
Silver medal – second place	2026 Tallinn	Singles
Silver medal – second place	2024 Tallinn	Singles
Silver medal – second place	2023 Tallinn	Singles
Bronze medal – third place	2022 Tallinn	Singles

Nataly Langerbaur (born 1 August 2004) is an Estonian figure skater. She is the 2026 Volvo Open Cup champion and a three-time national silver medalist (2023, 2024, 2026) and the 2022 bronze medalist. She has represented Estonia at the World and European Championships (2024, 2026).

== Personal life ==
Langerbaur was born on the August 1, 2004 in Tallinn, Estonia. In addition to figure skating, she also enjoys reading and cycling.

== Career ==
=== Early career ===
Langerbaur began skating in 2008 at the age of four and one of her first coaches was Anna Levandi. As an advanced novice skater, she won the 2017 Estonian Championships. The following season, Langerbaur made her junior national debut at the 2018 Estonian Junior Championships, finishing in fourth place.

=== 2018–19 season: Junior international debut ===
Making her junior international debut at the 2018 Volvo Open Cup, Langerbaur finished the event in nineteenth place. She followed this up by placing eleventh on the junior level at the 2018 Tallinn Trophy.

In December, Langerbaur made her senior national debut at the 2019 Estonian Championships where she finished in seventh place. A couple weeks later, she finished fourth at the 2019 Estonian Junior Championships. Langerbaur then finished the season by finishing fifth on the junior level at the 2019 Tallink Hotels Cup.

=== 2019–20 season ===
Langerbaur began her season by finishing ninth on the junior level at the 2019 Golden Bear of Zagreb. She followed this up by finishing fourteenth on the junior level at the 2019 Volvo Open Cup and seventh at the 2019 Tallinn Trophy.

In December, Langerbaur placed fourth at the 2020 Estonian Championships and went on to win silver at the 2020 Estonian Junior Championships almost two months later. She then finished the season by placing fourth on the junior level at the 2020 Tallink Hotels Cup.

=== 2020–21 season: Senior international debut ===
Coached by Irina Frolova, Langerbaur started the season by finishing fifth at the 2021 Estonian Championships. She then finished the season by making her senior international debut at 2021 Tallink Hotels Cup, finishing in thirteenth place.

=== 2021–22 season: National bronze medal ===
Langerbaur opened her season by debuting on the Challenger Series, Lombardia Trophy where she accumulated personal seasons bests and concluding the competition in twentieth place overall. She won the bronze medal at 2022 Estonian senior nationals. A month later, she decided to compete at the junior national championships as well, where she finished in fifth place.

In February, it was announced that Langerbaur had made a coaching change with Irina Kononova being listed as her new head coach.

=== 2022–23 season: First silver national medal ===
In December 2022, Nataly placed second and won the silver medal at Estonian nationals. A month later, she won the silver medal at the 2023 Volvo Cup.

=== 2023–24 season: European and World Championship debut, second national silver medal ===
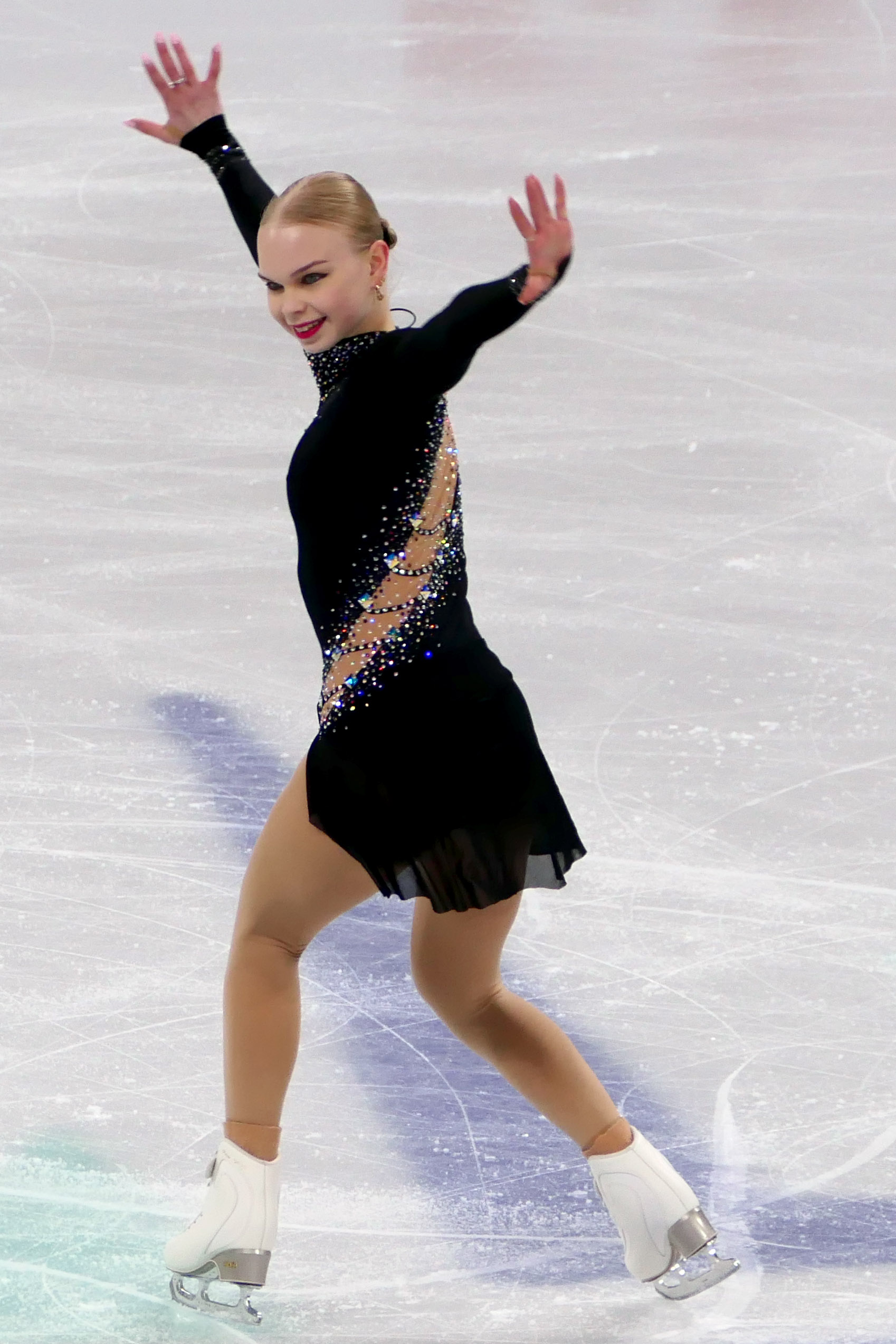
Langerbaur during her short program at the 2024 World Championships

At 2023 Estonian nationals, Langerbaur won her second consecutive national silver medal. In January 2024, she competed at the 2024 European Championships; finishing the event in fourteenth overall. Subsequently, she went onto win and become the champion of the 2024 Abu Dhabi Classic Trophy.

Langerbaur was selected to compete at the 2024 World Championships in Montreal, Canada as Estonia's second representative alongside Niina Petrõkina. She finished the event in twenty-first place overall.

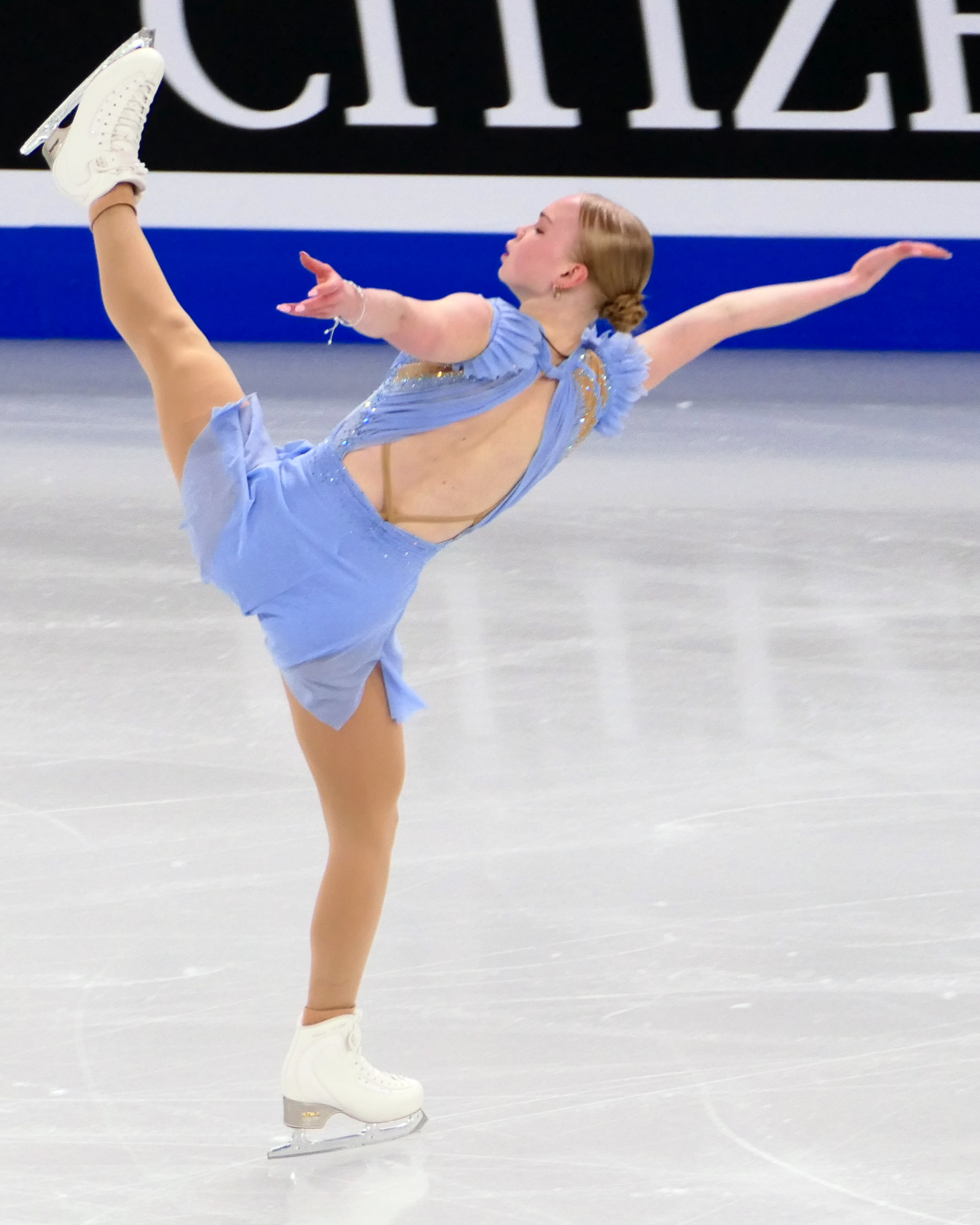
Langerbaur performing a fan spiral during her free skate at the 2024 World Championships

=== 2024–25 season: Bronze Challenger Series medal ===
She opened the season by competing at the 2024 Cup of Nice in France, placing twelfth overall. In March 2025, she won the bronze medal at the 2025 Sonja Henie Trophy behind Finland's Olivia Lisko and Italy's Lara Naki Gutmann.

=== 2025–26 season: Third silver national medal ===
Langerbaur won her third silver national medal at the 2026 national championships in December 2025. She was selected to compete at the 2026 European Championships, one of three Estonian quotas for women. She garnered a new personal best in the short program of 56.21 points. She finished tenth after the short program, dropping to twenty-first in the free skate and finished the event in nineteenth place. Just one week later, she went onto win the 2026 Volvo Open.

In March 2026, Langerbaur achieved a new personal best in the short program of 56.56 points at the 2026 World Championships. She concluded the event in twentieth place overall after setting a season's best score in both the free skate and the overall score.

== Programs ==
Season	Short program	Free skating	Exhibition
2026–2027	This is Only The Beginning by Steelfeather choreo. by Benoît Richaud	Story Of A March Day; Senses by Cédric Tour choreo. by Rostislav Sinicyn	
2025–2026	13 Beaches by Lana Del Rey	Story Of A March Day; Senses by Cédric Tour choreo. by Rostislav Sinicyn	
2024–2025	13 Beaches by Lana Del Rey	Je t'aime by Lara Fabian	
2023–2024	13 Beaches by Lana Del Rey	No More Fight Left in Me by Imany	
2022–2023	Love on the brain by Rhianna	Kill Bill Vol. 1 – The Grand Duel (Parte Prima) by Luis Bacalov; Bang Bang by Nancy Sinatra	

== Competitive highlights ==
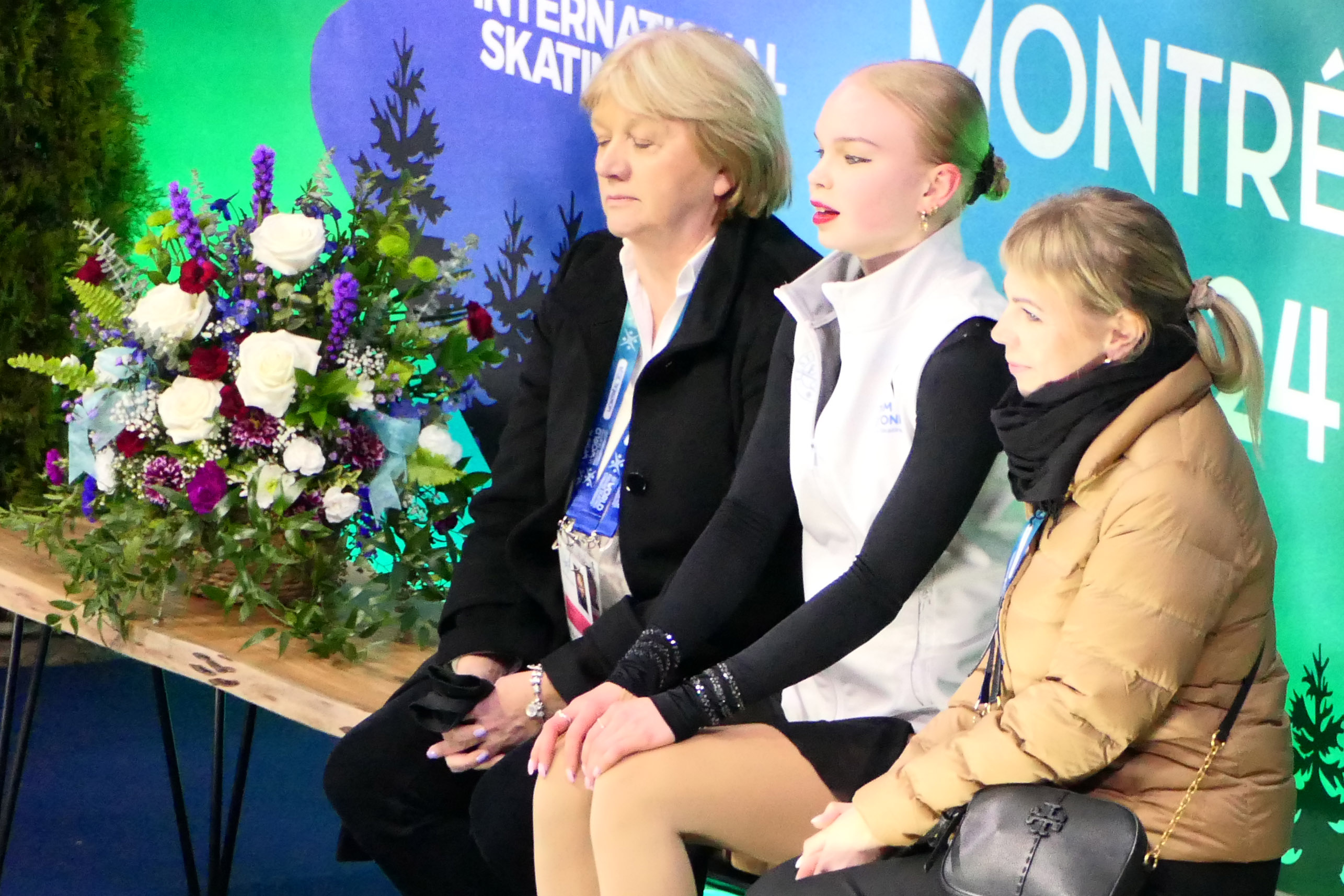
Langerbaur alongside her coaches in the 'Kiss and Cry' at the 2024 World Championships

- GP – Event of the ISU Grand Prix Series
- JGP – Event of the ISU Junior Grand Prix Series
- CS – Event of the ISU Challenger Series
- TBD – Assigned
- WD – Withdrew from competition

Competition placements at senior level
Season	2018–19	2019–20	2020–21	2021–22	2022–23	2023–24	2024–25	2025–26	2026–27
World Championships						21st		20th	
European Championships						14th		19th	
World University Games							16th		
Estonian Championships	7th	4th	5th	3rd	2nd	2nd		2nd	
CS Budapest Trophy					9th	6th			17th
CS Finlandia Trophy				22nd		12th			
CS Golden Spin					14th	5th	14th	10th	
CS Lombardia Trophy				20th					
CS Nepela Memorial								9th	
CS Tallinn Trophy		1st					11th		
CS Trialeti Trophy								15th	
CS Warsaw Cup				25th					
Abu Dhabi Classic						1st			
Crystal Skate Open								1st	
Ice Challenge					14th				
Challenge Cup					10th				
Sonja Henie Trophy							3rd		
Tallink Hotels Cup			13th	4th			5th	2nd	
Trophée Métropole Nice							12th		
Volvo Open Cup				9th	2nd			4th	2nd
57th Volvo Open Cup								1st	

Competition placements at junior level
Season	2017–18	2018–19	2019–20	2021–22	2022–23	2023–24
Estonian Championships	4th	4th	2nd	4th	3rd	4th
JGP Czech Republic					9th	
JGP Poland					20th	
JGP Turkey						10th
JGP Hungary						16th
Golden Bear			9th			
Tallink Hotels Cup		5th	4th			
Tallinn Trophy		11th	7th			3rd
Volvo Open Cup		19th	14th			3rd

== Detailed results ==
ISU personal best scores in the +5/-5 GOE System
Segment	Type	Score	Event
Total	TSS	165.85	2023 Budapest Trophy
Short program	TSS	56.56	2026 World Championships
Short program	TES	32.20	2022 JGP Czech Skate
Short program	PCS	26.50	2026 World Championships
Free skating	TSS	111.01	2023 Budapest Trophy
Free skating	TES	58.54	2023 Budapest Trophy
Free skating	PCS	53.13	2023 Golden Spin of Zagreb
