= Valdis Mintals =

Estonian pair skater

Personal information
- Full name: Valdis Mintals
- Born: 11 December 1979 (age 46) Tallinn, then part of Estonian SSR, Soviet Union
- Height: 1.82 m (5 ft 11 1/2 in)

Figure skating career
- Country: Estonia
- Skating club: FSC Medal, Tallinn
- Began skating: 1984
- Retired: 2002

Valdis Mintals (born 11 December 1979 in Tallinn) is an Estonian pair skater.

With partner Ekaterina Nekrassova, he is a multiple Estonian national champion. They competed at the World, European, and World Junior Championships before ending their partnership in 1998.

From 1998 through 2002, Mintals competed with Viktoria Shklover. They were the 1998–2002 Estonian national champions. They competed twice at the World Junior Championships, and three times at the World and European Championships. Their highest placement at an ISU Championship was 10th at the 2000 and 2001 European Championships.

Early in his career, Mintals competed in single skating.

Following his retirement in 2002 from competitive skating, Mintals performed in touring ice shows and ice theater.

== Programs ==
(with Shklover)

Season	Short program	Free skating
2001–2002	Pearl Harbor by Hans Zimmer	The Matrix
2000–2001	Fiddler on the Roof by Jerry Bock	Grease by Jim Jacobs

== Results ==
=== With Shklover ===
Results
International
Event	1998–1999	1999–2000	2000–2001	2001–2002
World Championships		17th	19th	17th
European Championships		10th	10th	11th
GP Trophée Lalique			9th	
Nebelhorn Trophy	6th	6th		6th
Skate Israel	7th			
International: Junior
Junior Worlds	10th	9th		
JGP Final		4th		
JGP France	2nd		3rd	
JGP Hungary	7th			
JGP Poland			6th	
JGP Netherlands		2nd		
JGP Sweden		1st		
Tallinn Cup		3rd		
National
Estonian Championships	1st	1st	1st	1st
GP = Grand Prix; JGP = Junior Grand Prix

=== With Nekrassova ===
Results
International
Event	1995–1996	1996–1997	1997–1998
World Championships	22nd	20th	23rd
European Championships	17th	15th	13th
Intern. St. Gervais		9th	
Karl Schäfer Memorial		7th	
Nebelhorn Trophy		8th	
International: Junior
Junior Worlds		18th	14th
Blue Swords		14th	
National
Estonian Championships	1st	1st	
