= Olga Vassiljeva =

Estonian figure skater

Personal information
- Born: 28 October 1977 (age 48) Tallinn, Estonian SSR
- Height: 1.70 m (5 ft 7 in)

Figure skating career
- Country: Estonia
- Skating club: FSC Medal Tallinn; Kristalluisk
- Began skating: 1980
- Retired: 2004

Olga Vassiljeva (born 28 October 1977) is an Estonian former competitive figure skater. She represented Estonia at the 1992 Winter Olympics in Albertville, placing 21st, and won ten national titles. Her highest placement at an ISU Championship was 15th, achieved at the 2003 European Championships.

== Programs ==
Season	Short program	Free skating
2003–04	Arabica by Didulya	Moulin Rouge! by Jose Feliciano
2002–03	Take Five by Dave Brubeck	Moulin Rouge! by Jose Feliciano; Bolero
2001–02	Take Five by Dave Brubeck	Sheherazade by Nikolai Rimsky-Korsakov
2000–01	Devil's Trill Sonata by Giuseppe Tartini performed by Vanessa-Mae	Introduction and Rondo Capriccioso in A Minor, Op. 28 by Camille Saint-Saëns

== Competitive highlights ==
International
Event	91–92	92–93	93–94	94–95	95–96	96–97	97–98	98–99	99–00	00–01	01–02	02–03	03–04
Winter Olympics	21st												
World Championship	30th	25th	31st				31st	29th	33rd	41st		27th	39th
European Championships	24th	23rd	33rd	12th Q				19th	19th	29th	31st	15th	28th
Finlandia Trophy										9th			12th
Nebelhorn Trophy									14th	8th	22nd		
Ondrej Nepela Memorial									9th	14th		5th	
Piruetten		11th					6th	5th					
Skate Israel									8th				
Tallinn Cup									3rd	3rd			
National
Estonian Championships		1st	1st	3rd	3rd	3rd	2nd	1st	1st	1st	1st	1st	2nd
Latvian Championships (Guest)						2nd							
