= Aleksei Saks =

Estonian pair skater

Personal information
- Born: 20 May 1982 (age 44) Tallinn, then part of Estonian SSR, Soviet Union
- Height: 1.77 m (5 ft 9 1/2 in)

Figure skating career
- Country: Estonia
- Skating club: FSC Medal Tallinn
- Retired: 2007

Aleksei Saks (born 20 May 1982 in Tallinn) is an Estonian former competitive pair skater. With Diana Rennik, he is the four times Estonian national champion. The two were placed 17th at the 2006 Winter Olympics. Saks previously competed internationally as a single skater on the junior level.

== Competitive highlights ==
(with Rennik)

Event	2001–2002	2002–2003	2003–2004	2004–2005	2005–2006	2006–2007
Winter Olympic Games					17th	
World Championships		19th	18th	16th		22nd
European Championships	17th	13th	12th	11th	12th	14th
World Junior Championships	13th	15th				
Estonian Championships	2nd	1st	1st	1st	1st	2nd
Trophée Eric Bompard					10th	
Cup of China				9th		
Karl Schafer Memorial					9th	
Nebelhorn Trophy					10th	
Finlandia Trophy		7th				
