= Helery Hälvin =

Estonian figure skater (born 1991)

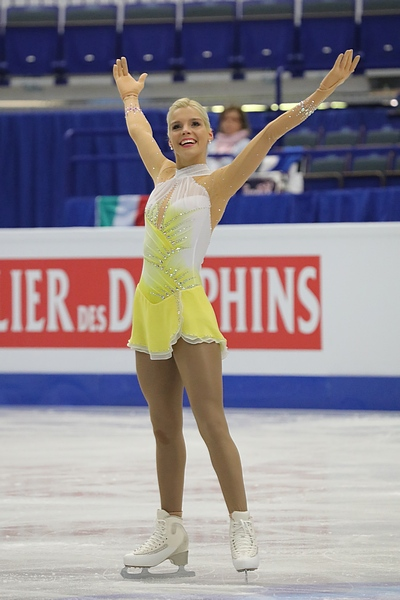
- Helery Hälvin in 2017

Personal information
- Born: 12 October 1991 (age 35) Jõgeva, Estonia
- Height: 1.68 m (5 ft 6 in)

Figure skating career
- Country: Estonia
- Discipline: Women's singles
- Began skating: 1998
- Retired: August 24, 2017

Medal record
Estonian Championships
Gold medal – first place	2014 Tallinn	Singles
Gold medal – first place	2016 Tallinn	Singles
Gold medal – first place	2017 Tallinn	Singles
Silver medal – second place	2015 Tallinn	Singles
Bronze medal – third place	2013 Tallinn	Singles

Helery Hälvin (born 12 October 1991) is an Estonian former competitive figure skater. She is a three-time (2014, 2016–17) Estonian national champion and has qualified to the free skate at two ISU Championships – 2016 Europeans in Bratislava, Slovakia, and 2017 Europeans in Ostrava, Czech Republic.

Early in her career, Hälvin was coached by Peeter Kulkov and Oksana Romanenko, and then by Irina Kononova and Alina Škuleta-Gromova through 2014–15. She switched to Anna Levandi in early May 2015.

== Programs ==
Season	Short program	Free skating
2016–2017	You Raise Me Up by Secret Garden performed by Westlife	I Surrender by Celine Dion
2014–2016	Fly by Celine Dion	A Place in Heaven; Empire of Angels by Thomas Bergersen

== Competitive highlights ==
CS: Challenger Series

International
Event	07–08	09–10	11–12	12–13	13–14	14–15	15–16	16–17
Worlds								27th
Europeans						29th	19th	15th
CS Finlandia						12th		15th
CS Lombardia								13th
CS Nebelhorn						14th		
CS Nepela Trophy							14th	
CS Tallinn Trophy							15th	12th
CS Volvo Cup						10th		
CS Warsaw Cup							8th	
Cup of Nice							11th	
Ice Star				4th	1st	3rd		
Nordics								11th
Sarajevo Open					3rd			
Seibt Memorial					10th		4th	
Sportland Trophy							10th	
Tallinn Trophy						12th		
Volvo Open Cup				13th	8th		4th	
Warsaw Cup				14th				
National
Estonian Champ.	4th J	3rd J	4th	3rd	1st	2nd	1st	1st
J = Junior level
