= Johanna Allik =

Estonian figure skater (born 1994)

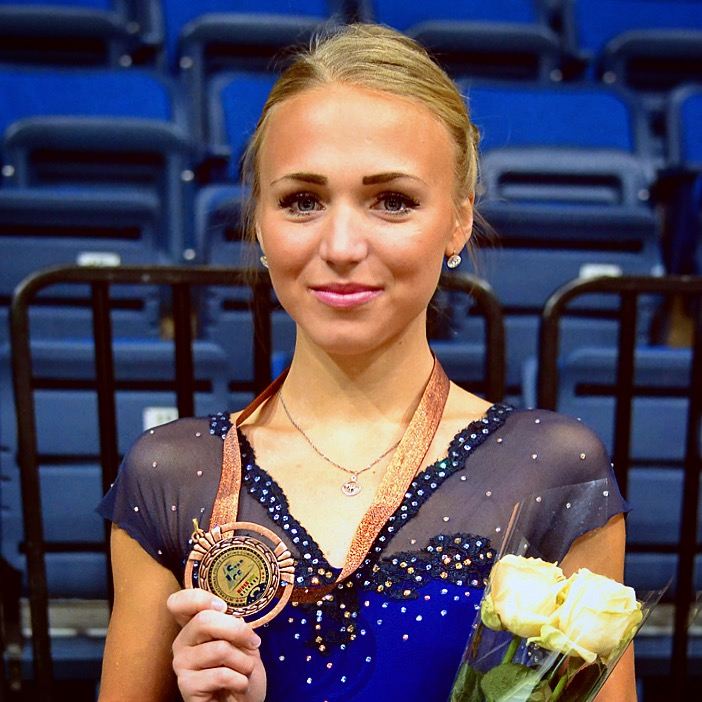
- Johanna Allik at the 2015 Ice Star

Personal information
- Born: 7 April 1994 (age 32) Tallinn, Estonia
- Height: 1.64 m (5 ft 4 1/2 in)

Figure skating career
- Country: Estonia
- Discipline: Women's singles
- Began skating: 1999

Medal record
Estonian Championships
Silver medal – second place	2008 Tallinn	Singles
Silver medal – second place	2010 Tallinn	Singles

Johanna Allik (born 7 April 1994 in Tallinn), is an Estonian figure skater. She initially competed in singles skating and achieved two senior international medals. Additionally, she secured the Estonian national silver medal twice, in 2008 and 2010. In 2011, she transitioned to ice dance and, with partner Paul Bellantuono, won the 2012 Estonian junior title. Following a two-season break from competitive skating between 2013 and 2015, she returned to singles skating for the 2015–16 figure skating season.

== Programs ==
=== Single skating ===
Season	Short program	Free skating
2016–2018	Flamenco	To Build a Home by The Cinematic Orchestra
2015–2016	Hip Hip Chin Chin by Club des Belugas	Often a Bird by Wim Mertens; L'Espoir by Margaux Avril
2010–2011	Salome	Symphony by Sergei Prokofiev
2008–2009	Bolero (from Moulin Rouge!)	Rhapsody in Blue by George Gershwin
2007–2008	Carmen Suite by Georges Bizet	The Phantom of the Opera by Andrew Lloyd Webber

=== Ice dance with Paul Bellantuono ===
Season	Short dance	Free dance
2012–2013	Swing: Don't Mess With My Man by Nadja; Blues: Me and Mr. Jones by Amy Winehouse	Polovtsian Dances (from Prince Igor) by Alexander Borodin
2011–2012	Rhumba; Cha Cha	Burlesque

== Competitive highlights ==
=== Single skating ===
International
Event	05–06	06–07	07–08	08–09	09–10	10–11	15–16	16–17	17–18
CS Denkova-Staviski							8th		
CS Ice Star									15th
CS Ondrej Nepela								18th	
CS Tallinn Trophy							17th	17th	25th
CS U.S. Classic							17th		
CS Warsaw Cup								19th	
Cup of Nice					20th				
Hellmut Seibt							6th		
Ice Challenge									6th
Ice Star							3rd		
Sofia Trophy							2nd		
Sportland Trophy							4th		
Toruń Cup							10th		
International: Junior
JGP Austria			12th						
JGP Belarus				7th					
JGP Croatia					12th				
JGP France				17th					
JGP Japan						17th			
JGP Poland					14th				
JGP U.K.			17th						
EYOF				7th					
National
Estonian Champ.	2nd J		2nd	3rd	2nd		4th	5th	4th

=== Ice dance with Paul Bellantuono ===
International
Event	2011–12	2012–13
World Junior Champ.	12th PR	31st
JGP Slovenia		8th
JGP United States		10th
Pavel Roman Memorial		5th J
Santa Claus Cup	9th J	
National
Estonian Champ.	2nd J	1st J
