= Ilja Glebov =

Estonian former competitive pair skater (born 1987)

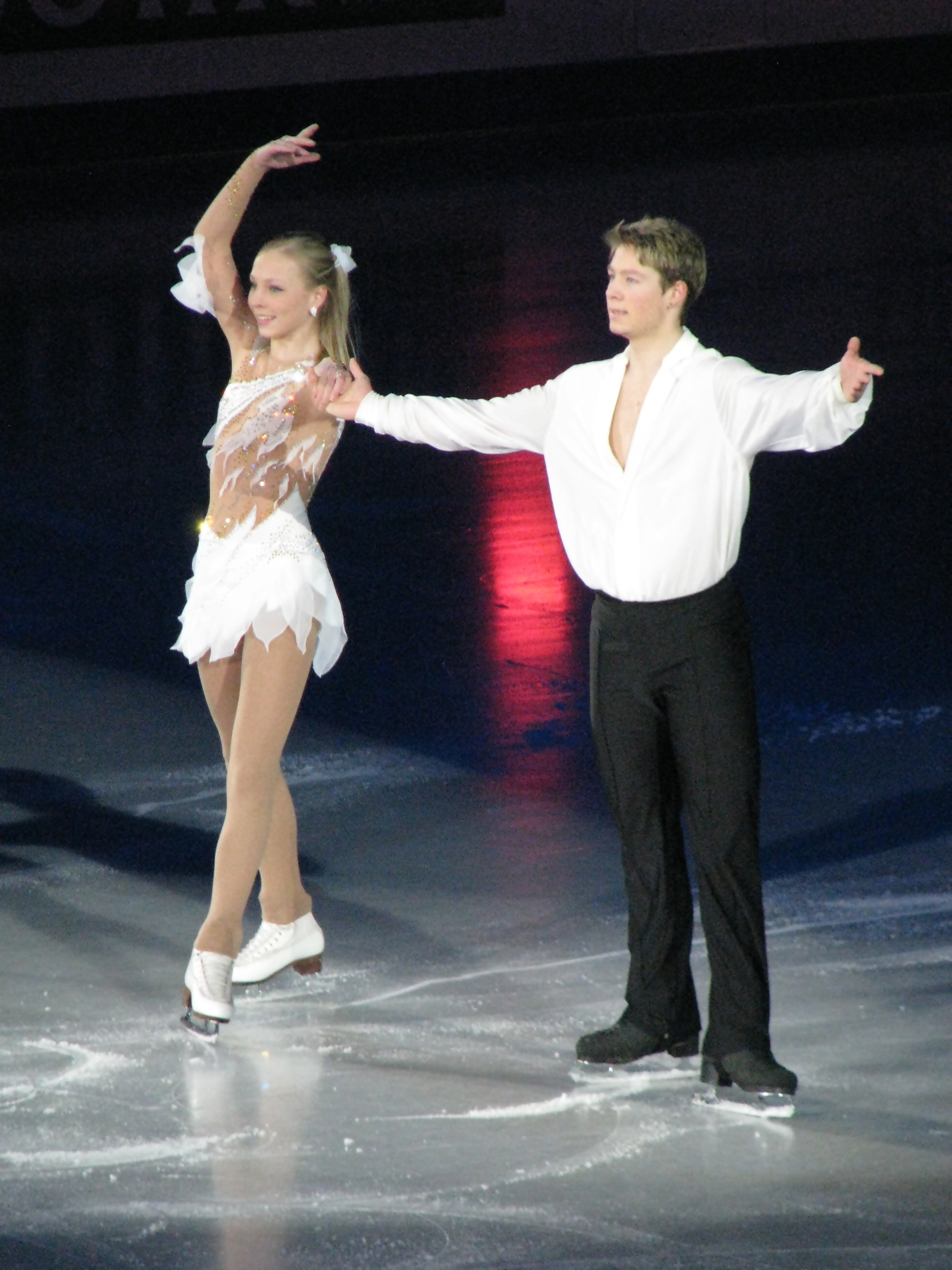
- Sergejeva/Glebov at the 2010 European Championships

Personal information
- Born: 22 July 1987 (age 39) Tallinn, then part of Estonian SSR, Soviet Union
- Height: 1.80 m (5 ft 11 in)

Figure skating career
- Country: Estonia

Ilja Glebov (born 22 July 1987 in Tallinn) is an Estonian former competitive pair skater. With former partner Maria Sergejeva, he is the 2007–09 Estonian national champion and competed at the 2010 Winter Olympics in Vancouver. After they parted ways at the end of the 2009–10 season, he considered partnering with another skater but had army service. He is the elder brother of Estonian figure skater Jelena Glebova.

== Programs ==
With Sergejeva

Season	Short program	Free skating
2009–10	The Legend of 1900 by Ennio Morricone	West Side Story by Leonard Bernstein
2008–09	Polish movie	Romeo and Juliet by Nino Rota
2007–08	Russian Balalaika	Kill Bill
2006–07	Harlequin	Fiddler on the Roof by Jerry Bock, John Williams; Casablanca by Max Steiner

== Competitive highlights ==
With Sergejeva

GP: Grand Prix; JGP: Junior Grand Prix

International
Event	04–05	05–06	06–07	07–08	08–09	09–10
Winter Olympics						19th
World Champ.					17th	18th
European Champ.					14th	13th
GP Cup of China				6th		
GP Cup of Russia				7th		8th
GP NHK Trophy					5th	
Ice Challenge						6th
Nebelhorn Trophy						9th
International: Junior
World Junior Champ.			7th	6th	12th	
JGP Belarus					10th	
JGP Czech Republic			9th			
JGP Estonia				6th		
JGP Norway			7th			
JGP United Kingdom				6th	6th	
National
Estonian			1st	1st	1st	
Estonian Junior	1st	1st	1st			
