= Benita Parri =

Estonian figure skating coach

Benita Parri (until 1937 Fink, 1937–1943 Virgla; 2 February 1922 – 21 May 2008) was an Estonian figure skating and tennis coach and former ice dancer.

She was born in Viljandi.

In 1936 she joined with Frieda Rosenberg's gymnastics and dance group. In 1951 she won silver medal at Estonian championships in ice dance.

1950–1965 he worked as a figure skating and tennis coach at Viljandi Sport Club. Students: Anne Ronk, Malle Aarik, Mait Murss.
