= Bosphorus Cup =

Bosphorus Cup may refer to:

- Bosphorus Challenger Cup, an ATP Challenger Tour tennis event
- Bosphorus Cup (figure skating), a figure skating competition
- International Bosphorus Cup, a horse race
