= Vaike Paduri =

Estonian figure skater

Vaike Paduri (until 1930 Kalkun; 1930-1941 Kaljuvee; 19 August 1911 – 30 July 1995) was an Estonian figure skater and figure skating coach.

She was born in Taheva Rural Municipality, Valga County. In 1954 she graduated from Lesgaft National State University of Physical Education, Sport and Health. She started her skating exercises when she was 15. Her coach was Eduard Hiiop.

In 1945 she won Soviet Union Championships in figure skating. She was also multiple-times Estonian champion in several figure skating disciplines.

In 1967 she was named as Merited Coach of Estonian SSR.
