= Maria Sergejeva =

Estonian figure skater and model

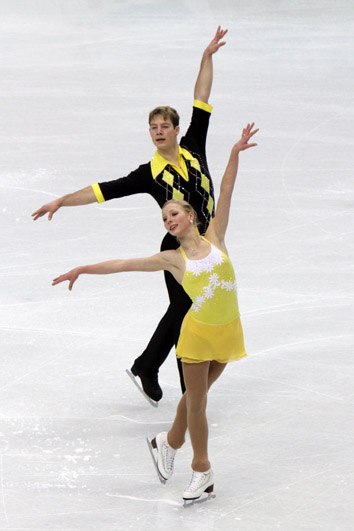
- Sergejeva and Glebov at the 2010 Winter Olympics

Personal information
- Born: 28 October 1992 (age 33) Tallinn, Estonia
- Height: 1.77 m (5 ft 10 in)

Figure skating career
- Country: Estonia
- Retired: 2010

Maria Sergejeva (born 28 October 1992 in Tallinn) is an Estonian former competitive pair skater, graduate gemologist, jewelry designer, and entrepreneur

With former partner Ilja Glebov, she is the 2007–10 Estonian national champion and represented Estonia at the 2010 Winter Olympics. Following her competitive retirement in 2010, Sergejeva performed worldwide in theatre and arena shows, including Disney on Ice, Fantasy on Ice, ITV’s Dacing on ice, SBS6’s Dancing on Ice and other international ice productions.

She later completed the International Gemological Institute (IGI) School of Gemology, qualifying as a Graduate Gemologist and Professional Jewelry Designer, and founded the Dubai-based jewelry brand DiaMaria.

. Durimg her acting career she appeared in Fast and Furious spin off movie “Hobbs and Shaw” next to Dwayne Johnson and Jason Statham. She worked with Harry Styles on the skating scene in a One Direction music video for Night Changes. She also worked with Mario Testino as Lily James’s body double in a Burberry fragrance campaign.

Sergejeva is based between Dubai and London, where she oversees her jewelry business and international design projects.

== Programs ==
With Glebov

Season	Short program	Free skating
2009–10	The Legend of 1900 by Ennio Morricone	West Side Story by Leonard Bernstein
2008–09	Polish movie	Romeo and Juliet by Nino Rota
2007–08	Russian Balalaika	Kill Bill
2006–07	Harlequin	Fiddler on the Roof by Jerry Bock, John Williams; Casablanca by Max Steiner

== Competitive highlights ==
With Glebov

GP: Grand Prix; JGP: Junior Grand Prix

International
Event	04–05	05–06	06–07	07–08	08–09	09–10
Winter Olympics						19th
World Champ.					17th	18th
European Champ.					14th	13th
GP Cup of China				6th		
GP Cup of Russia				7th		8th
GP NHK Trophy					5th	
Ice Challenge						6th
Nebelhorn Trophy						9th
International: Junior
World Junior Champ.			7th	6th	12th	
JGP Belarus					10th	
JGP Czech Republic			9th			
JGP Estonia				6th		
JGP Norway			7th			
JGP United Kingdom				6th	6th	
National
Estonian			1st	1st	1st	
Estonian Junior	1st	1st	1st			
