= Eduard Hiiop =

Estonian athlete (1889–1941)

Personal information
- Born: 19 December 1889 Walk, Governorate of Livonia
- Died: 24 August 1941 (aged 51) Tallinn, Estonia

Sport
- Sport: Figure skating, athletics
- Club: Kalev Tallinn

Eduard Hiiop (19 December 1889 – 24 August 1941) was an Estonian figure skater and athlete. He participated in the 1928 Winter Olympics as the flag bearer for Estonia and competed in 1936, placing 18th with Helene Michelson in pair skating.

Hiiop started training in skating, gymnastics, athletics and cycling while living in Tartu in 1908. He then moved to Tallinn, and in 1912–13 focused on figure skating, tennis, and athletics: winning multiple Estonian titles in all these disciplines. He competed at the Estonian and Russian championships in most athletic events, including the decathlon. After retiring as a competitive athlete, he worked as a coach and sports functionary in Helsinki (1937–39) and Tallinn (1940–41). In August 1941 he was arrested by the Soviet authorities and presumedly died the same month.
