= Helene Michelson =

Estonian figure skater

Personal information
- Nationality: Estonian
- Born: 8 December 1906; Tallinn, Estonia

Sport
- Sport: Figure skating

Helene Michelson (born 8 December 1906, date of death unknown) was an Estonian figure skater. She competed in the pairs event at the 1936 Winter Olympics.

Helene Michelson and Karin Peckert-Forsman were the first Estonian females at the Winter Olympics. Alpine skier Peckert-Forsman competed first and is therefor counted as the first female competitors at the Olympics from Estonia.
