= Nikolai Salnikov =

Estonian figure skater and referee

Nikolai Salnikov (born 2 July 1957) is an Estonian ice dancer and referee.

He was born in Tallinn. In 1979 he graduated from Tallinn Pedagogical Institute's Faculty of Chemistry.

In 1973 he won gold medal at Soviet Union junior championships. He is 8-times Estonian champion in ice dance: 1971–1974 with Natalia Tokareva, and 1975–1978 with Tamara Prokopjuk. 1973 he was a member of Soviet Union junior national figure skating team.

Since 1980 he is working as a figure skating referee, since 2003 also at ISU competitions.
