= Estonian Skating Union =

Sports governing body in Estonia

- Sport: Figure skating
- Founded: 1991
- Affiliation: International Skating Union
- (Estonia)

Estonian Skating Union (abbreviation ESU; Estonian: Eesti Uisuliit) is one of the sport governing bodies in Estonia which deals with figure skating and speed skating.

ESU is established on 23 January 1991 and is one of the successor of Estonian Winter Sport Union (Estonian: Eesti Talvespordi Liit), which was established in 1921. ESU is a member of International Skating Union (ISU).
